= List of Nintendo 3DS games (0–M) =

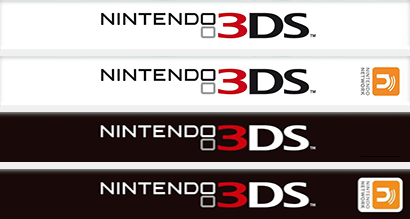
The international white Nintendo 3DS banner used on current and upcoming retail game covers (top) In Japan, the banner is black for Nintendo 3DS games rated by CERO as C or D (bottom). Nintendo Network-compatible games feature a small logo on top of the banner, but as of November 2014, the small Amiibo logo is dominantly featured instead, even if said games also supported Nintendo Network. The Nintendo Network logo will continue to feature if Amiibo support is definitely absent. On actual retail game case covers, the banner is flipped vertically. Game cases for games dedicated exclusively to New Nintendo 3DS (such as Xenoblade Chronicles 3D) feature a different template layout.

This is a list of all video games released for the Nintendo 3DS. For games that were announced or in-development, but never released, see the list of cancelled Nintendo 3DS games.

== Games ==
The Nintendo 3DS portable system has a large library of games, which are released in game card and/or digital form. This list does not include downloadable games available via the Virtual Console service. The Nintendo 3DS family is backward compatible with its predecessor, the Nintendo DS line, and its software, including most DSi software. The list is initially organized alphabetically by their English titles or their alphabet conversions, but it is also possible to sort each column individually by clicking the square icon at the top of each column. The Nintendo 3DS system is region locked, meaning that in reality each system has a restricted library of games to select from, depending on the region of the device; the list below displays the availability of games within each of the four regions.

The last first-party game to release for the Nintendo 3DS is Kirby's Extra Epic Yarn, which released in Japan on March 7, 2019, in North America and Europe on March 8, 2019, and in Australasia on March 9, 2019. The last third-party games to release for the Nintendo 3DS are Silver Falls: Gaiden Deathly Delusion Destroyers and Silver Falls: Ruby River, which both released exclusively in North America on the Nintendo eShop on March 9, 2023.

For a chronological list, click the sort button in any of the available regions' column. Games dated February 26, 2011, (Japan), March 25, 2011, (Europe), March 27, 2011, (North America), and March 31, 2011, (Australasia) are the launch titles of each respective region.

There are 1792 games in this table across all pages: 0 to M, and N to Z (Note: This number is always up to date by this script.) games on this list.

List of Nintendo 3DS games
Title	Developer(s)	Publisher(s)	Release date				Ref.
Title	Developer(s)	Publisher(s)	Japan	North America	Australasia	Europe	Ref.
10-in-1: Arcade Collection	Gamelion Studios	Gamelion Studios	March 26, 2014	August 15, 2013	Unreleased	August 1, 2013	
100% Pascal Sensei: Kanpeki Paint Bombers	Konami	Konami	July 13, 2017	Unreleased	Unreleased	Unreleased	
1000m Zombie Escape!	Oink Games	Oink Games	March 1, 2017	Unreleased	Unreleased	Unreleased	
1001 Spikes	8bits Fanatics	Nicalis	November 25, 2015	June 3, 2014	Unreleased	October 1, 2015	
101 DinoPets 3D	Teyon	Selectsoft	March 13, 2013	January 10, 2013	Unreleased	June 20, 2013	
101 Penguin Pets 3D	Teyon	Selectsoft	April 23, 2014	October 17, 2013	Unreleased	December 19, 2013	
101 Pony Pets 3D	Teyon	Selectsoft	April 22, 2015	July 24, 2014	Unreleased	November 20, 2014	
12-Sai. Honto no Kimochi	Happinet	Happinet	December 18, 2014	Unreleased	Unreleased	Unreleased	
12-Sai. Koisuru Diary	Happinet	Happinet	August 4, 2016	Unreleased	Unreleased	Unreleased	
12-Sai. Torokeru Puzzle Futari no Harmony	Happinet	Happinet	October 26, 2017	Unreleased	Unreleased	Unreleased	
2 Fast 4 Gnomz	QubicGames	QubicGames	June 26, 2013	November 1, 2012	Unreleased	December 6, 2012	
2048	Cosmigo	Cosmigo	September 10, 2014	June 19, 2014	Unreleased	July 31, 2014	
36 Fragments of Midnight	Petite Games	Petite Games	Unreleased	September 21, 2017	Unreleased	September 21, 2017	
3D After Burner II	M2	Sega	December 18, 2013	January 15, 2015	January 15, 2015	January 15, 2015	
3D Altered Beast	M2	Sega	May 29, 2013	December 5, 2013	December 5, 2013	December 5, 2013	
3D Block Kuzushi	SilverStar	SilverStar	June 7, 2011	Unreleased	Unreleased	Unreleased	
3D Classics: Excitebike	Arika	Nintendo	June 6, 2011	June 6, 2011	June 6, 2011	June 7, 2011	
3D Classics: Kid Icarus	Arika	Nintendo	January 18, 2012	February 2, 2012	February 2, 2012	February 2, 2012	
3D Classics: Kirby's Adventure	Arika	Nintendo	November 17, 2011	November 17, 2011	November 17, 2011	November 17, 2011	
3D Classics: TwinBee	Arika	Nintendo	August 10, 2011	September 22, 2011	September 22, 2011	September 22, 2011	
3D Classics: Urban Champion	Arika	Nintendo	July 13, 2011	August 18, 2011	August 18, 2011	August 18, 2011	
3D Classics: Xevious	Arika	Nintendo	June 7, 2011	July 21, 2011	July 21, 2011	July 21, 2011	
3D Ecco the Dolphin	M2	Sega	June 26, 2013	December 12, 2013	December 12, 2013	December 12, 2013	
3D Fantasy Zone	M2	Sega	March 19, 2014	February 12, 2015	February 12, 2015	February 12, 2015	
3D Fantasy Zone II W	M2	Sega	July 16, 2014	April 16, 2015	April 16, 2015	April 16, 2015	
3D Galaxy Force II	M2	Sega	November 27, 2013	December 12, 2013	December 12, 2013	December 12, 2013	
3D Game Collection: 55-in-1	Joindots	Joindots	July 24, 2013	December 20, 2012	March 29, 2012	February 10, 2012	
3D Gunstar Heroes	M2	Sega	June 24, 2015	August 20, 2015	August 20, 2015	August 20, 2015	
3D MahJongg	SunSoft	Joindots	Unreleased	November 22, 2012	Unreleased	April 9, 2012	
3D Out Run	M2	Sega	April 23, 2014	March 12, 2015	March 12, 2015	March 12, 2015	
3D Power Drift	M2	Sega	November 2, 2016	Unreleased	Unreleased	Unreleased	
3D Puyo Puyo Tsuu	M2	Sega	August 3, 2016	Unreleased	Unreleased	Unreleased	
3D Retro Dungeon Puzzle Challenge	Skunk Software	Skunk Software	Unreleased	May 3, 2018	Unreleased	Unreleased	
3D Shinobi III: Return of the Ninja Master	M2	Sega	August 7, 2013	December 19, 2013	December 19, 2013	December 19, 2013	
3D Solitaire	Zen Studios	Zen Studios	Unreleased	August 2, 2012	Unreleased	June 7, 2012	
3D Sonic the Hedgehog	M2	Sega	May 15, 2013	December 5, 2013	December 5, 2013	December 5, 2013	
3D Sonic the Hedgehog 2	M2	Sega	July 22, 2015	October 8, 2015	October 8, 2015	October 8, 2015	
3D Space Harrier	M2	Sega	December 26, 2012	November 28, 2013	November 28, 2013	November 28, 2013	
3D Streets of Rage	M2	Sega	August 21, 2013	December 19, 2013	December 19, 2013	December 19, 2013	
3D Streets of Rage 2	M2	Sega	April 28, 2015	July 23, 2015	July 23, 2015	July 23, 2015	
3D Super Hang-On	M2	Sega	March 27, 2013	November 28, 2013	November 28, 2013	November 28, 2013	
3D Thunder Blade	M2	Sega	August 20, 2014	May 14, 2015	May 14, 2015	May 14, 2015	
4 Elements	NA: Engine Software; PAL: Media Sales & Licensing	NA: Tulip Games; PAL: Media Sales & Licensing	Unreleased	November 7, 2013	November 29, 2012	September 27, 2012	
50 Classic Games 3D	Avanquest Software	NA: Maximum Family Games; EU: Avanquest Software	Unreleased	April 24, 2012	Unreleased	March 2, 2012	
50 Pinch Barrage	Mobile & Game Studio	Mobile & Game Studio	September 26, 2014	March 12, 2015	Unreleased	Unreleased	
6180 the moon	Rainy Frog	EU: Turtle Cream; WW: Rainy Frog	March 8, 2017	June 29, 2017	Unreleased	March 16, 2017	
6×1≠Unlimited	A+ Games	A+ Games	January 7, 2015	Unreleased	Unreleased	Unreleased	
7th Dragon III Code: VFD	Sega	Sega	October 15, 2015	July 12, 2016	December 2, 2016	December 2, 2016	
80's Overdrive	Insane Code	Insane Code	March 14, 2018	December 14, 2017	December 3, 2017	December 3, 2017	
A-Ressha de Ikou 3D NEO	Artdink	Artdink	December 1, 2016	Unreleased	Unreleased	Unreleased	
A-Train 3D: City Simulator	Artdink	Natsume Inc.	February 13, 2014	April 14, 2015	April 16, 2015	April 16, 2015	
Accel Knights 2: Full Throttle	ArtePiazza	ArtePiazza	July 30, 2014	Unreleased	Unreleased	Unreleased	
Ace Combat: Assault Horizon Legacy	Access Games	Bandai Namco Games	January 12, 2012	November 15, 2011	December 1, 2011	December 2, 2011	
Ace Combat: Assault Horizon Legacy +	Project Aces	Bandai Namco Games	January 29, 2015	February 10, 2015	February 19, 2015	February 13, 2015	
Acrylic Palette: Irodori Cafe – Cheers	Klon	Klon	December 20, 2012	Unreleased	Unreleased	Unreleased	
Adventure Bar Story	RideOn Japan	RideOn Japan	June 25, 2014	February 19, 2015	November 25, 2016	March 26, 2015	
Adventure Labyrinth Story	RideOn Japan	JP: RideOn Japan; WW: Circle Entertainment	February 10, 2016	September 1, 2016	Unreleased	July 21, 2016	
Adventure Time: Explore the Dungeon Because I Don't Know!	WayForward Technologies	NA: D3 Publisher; WW: Bandai Namco Games	Unreleased	November 19, 2013	December 19, 2013	December 13, 2013	
Adventure Time: Finn & Jake Investigations	WayForward Technologies	Little Orbit	Unreleased	October 20, 2015	November 6, 2015	November 6, 2015	
Adventure Time: Hey Ice King! Why'd You Steal Our Garbage?!!	WayForward Technologies	NA: D3 Publisher; WW: Bandai Namco Games	Unreleased	November 20, 2012	February 13, 2014	February 13, 2014	
Adventure Time: The Secret of the Nameless Kingdom	WayForward Technologies	JP: Bergsala Lightweight; WW: Little Orbit	December 15, 2016	November 18, 2014	November 20, 2014	November 21, 2014	
The Adventures of Tintin: The Game	Ubisoft	Ubisoft	January 12, 2012	December 6, 2011	December 1, 2011	October 21, 2011	
Aero Porter	Vivarium Inc.	Level-5	December 5, 2012	November 29, 2012	November 29, 2012	November 29, 2012	
AeternoBlade	Corecell Technology	Corecell Technology	March 19, 2014	February 18, 2014	Unreleased	February 27, 2014	
Aikatsu Stars! First Appeal	Bandai Namco Games	Bandai Namco Games	July 20, 2016	Unreleased	Unreleased	Unreleased	
Aikatsu Stars! My Special Appeal	Bandai Namco Games	Bandai Namco Games	November 24, 2016	Unreleased	Unreleased	Unreleased	
Aikatsu! 2-nin no My Princess	Bandai Namco Games	Bandai Namco Games	November 21, 2013	Unreleased	Unreleased	Unreleased	
Aikatsu! 365-Hi no Idol Days	Bandai Namco Games	Bandai Namco Games	December 4, 2014	Unreleased	Unreleased	Unreleased	
Aikatsu! Cinderella Lesson	Bandai Namco Games	Bandai Namco Games	November 15, 2012	Unreleased	Unreleased	Unreleased	
Aikatsu! My No.1 Stage!	Bandai Namco Games	Bandai Namco Games	November 25, 2015	Unreleased	Unreleased	Unreleased	
AiRace Speed	QubicGames	QubicGames	December 18, 2013	September 19, 2013	Unreleased	September 19, 2013	
AiRace Xeno	QubicGames	QubicGames	October 29, 2014	June 12, 2014	Unreleased	June 12, 2014	
Air Battle Hockey 3D	Silver Star	JP: Silver Star; WW: Agetec	April 18, 2012	January 3, 2013	Unreleased	May 23, 2013	
Akari by Nikoli	Nikoli	Hamster Corporation	July 20, 2011	July 5, 2012	Unreleased	December 19, 2013	
AKB48 + Me	Kadokawa Shoten	Kadokawa Shoten	October 25, 2012	Unreleased	Unreleased	Unreleased	
Alchemic Dungeons	Flyhigh Works	Flyhigh Works	May 31, 2017	August 17, 2017	Unreleased	July 6, 2017	
Alien Chaos 3D	Ludosity	GMG Play	Unreleased	March 27, 2012	Unreleased	April 4, 2013	
Alien on the Run	G-Style	G-Style	April 30, 2014	May 22, 2014	Unreleased	August 4, 2016	
All Kamen Rider: Rider Revolution	Bandai Namco Games	Bandai Namco Games	December 1, 2016	Unreleased	Unreleased	Unreleased	
Alliance Alive	FuRyu	JP: FuRyu; WW: Atlus USA	June 22, 2017	March 27, 2018	March 27, 2018	March 27, 2018	
Alien Panic	SIMS	Starsign	January 13, 2016	Unreleased	Unreleased	Unreleased	
Alphadia	Kemco	Kemco	December 9, 2015	February 4, 2016	February 11, 2016	February 11, 2016	
Alter World	Lemondo Games	Lemondo Games	Unreleased	April 5, 2018	Unreleased	Unreleased	
The Amazing Spider-Man	Beenox	Activision	Unreleased	June 26, 2012	June 27, 2012	June 29, 2012	
The Amazing Spider-Man 2	Beenox	Activision	Unreleased	April 29, 2014	May 7, 2014	May 2, 2014	
Ambition of the Slimes	Circle Entertainment	Circle Entertainment	June 15, 2016	August 11, 2016	Unreleased	August 11, 2016	
American Mensa Academy	Silverball Studios	Maximum Games	Unreleased	November 27, 2012	August 9, 2012	July 27, 2012	
Andro Dunos II	Picorinne Soft	Pixelheart	2022	Unreleased	Unreleased	2022	
Angler's Club: Ultimate Bass Fishing 3D	Tamsoft	JP/NA: D3 Publisher; WW: Bandai Namco Games	February 2, 2012	October 25, 2011	November 24, 2011	September 30, 2011	
Angry Birds Star Wars	Rovio Entertainment; Exient Entertainment	Activision	Unreleased	October 29, 2013	October 30, 2013	November 1, 2013	
Angry Birds Trilogy	Rovio Entertainment; Exient Entertainment	Activision	Unreleased	September 25, 2012	November 14, 2012	September 28, 2012	
Angry Bunnies	Cypronia	Cypronia	Unreleased	October 31, 2013	Unreleased	November 28, 2013	
Angry Video Game Nerd Adventures	FreakZone Games	ScrewAttack	Unreleased	June 4, 2015	Unreleased	December 10, 2015	
Animal Crossing: Happy Home Designer	Nintendo EAD	Nintendo	July 30, 2015	September 25, 2015	October 3, 2015	October 2, 2015	
Animal Crossing: New Leaf	Nintendo EAD	Nintendo	November 8, 2012	June 9, 2013	June 15, 2013	June 14, 2013	
Animal Hospital	Bigben Interactive	Bigben Interactive	Unreleased	Unreleased	Unreleased	October 24, 2013	
Another World: 20th Anniversary Edition	Delphine Software	Digital Lounge	January 21, 2015	June 19, 2014	Unreleased	June 19, 2014	
Anpanman to Asobo: New Aiueo Kyoushitsu	Bandai Namco Games	Bandai Namco Games	2014	Unreleased	Unreleased	Unreleased	
Anpanman to Touch de Waku Waku Training	Bandai Namco Games	Bandai Namco Games	2014	Unreleased	Unreleased	Unreleased	
Apollo Justice: Ace Attorney	Capcom	Capcom	November 22, 2017	November 21, 2017	Unreleased	November 23, 2017	
Aqua Moto Racing 3D	Zordix	Zordix	August 27, 2013	October 10, 2013	Unreleased	June 27, 2013	
AR Games	HAL Laboratory	Nintendo	Unreleased	March 27, 2011	Unreleased	March 25, 2011	
Arc Style: Baseball 3D	Arc System Works	Arc System Works	July 11, 2012	May 15, 2014	Unreleased	October 30, 2014	
Arc Style: Free Cell	Arc System Works	Arc System Works	May 30, 2012	Unreleased	Unreleased	Unreleased	
Arc Style: Happy Ocean	Arc System Works	Arc System Works	March 6, 2013	Unreleased	Unreleased	Unreleased	
Arc Style: Jazzy Billiards 3D Professional	Arc System Works	Arc System Works	August 10, 2011	Unreleased	Unreleased	Unreleased	
Arc Style: Sangokushi Pinball	Arc System Works	Arc System Works	April 25, 2012	Unreleased	Unreleased	Unreleased	
Arc Style: Simple Mahjong 3D	Arc System Works	Arc System Works	November 30, 2011	Unreleased	Unreleased	Unreleased	
Arc Style: Soccer 3D	Arc System Works	Arc System Works	June 7, 2011	March 29, 2012	Unreleased	August 22, 2013	
ARC STYLE: Soccer!! 2014	Arc System Works	Arc System Works	May 14, 2014	Unreleased	Unreleased	Unreleased	
Arc Style: Solitaire	Arc System Works	Arc System Works	October 19, 2014	January 30, 2014	Unreleased	Unreleased	
Arc Style: Spider Solitaire	Arc System Works	Arc System Works	January 25, 2012	Unreleased	Unreleased	Unreleased	
Arc Style: Women's Football 3D	Arc System Works	Arc System Works	July 25, 2012	Unreleased	Unreleased	Unreleased	
Arcade Classics 3D	Enjoy Gaming	Enjoy Gaming	Unreleased	October 31, 2013	Unreleased	November 7, 2013	
Are You Smarter Than A 5th Grader?	Black Lantern Studios	GameMill Entertainment	Unreleased	September 3, 2015	Unreleased	Unreleased	
Arrow of Laputa: Kage Nashi Sensei to Kiron no Fuuken	ArtePiazza	ArtePiazza	March 26, 2014	Unreleased	Unreleased	Unreleased	
Art of Balance Touch!	Shin'en Multimedia	JP: Arc System Works; WW: Shin'en Multimedia	April 24, 2013	June 7, 2012	May 24, 2012	May 24, 2012	
Ascent of Kings	Nostatic Software	Nostatic Software	Unreleased	April 13, 2017	Unreleased	April 27, 2017	
Asdivine Cross	Exe Create	Kemco	June 14, 2017	July 13, 2017	Unreleased	July 13, 2017	
Ash	OverTune; SRRN Games	Circle Entertainment	Unreleased	April 28, 2016	Unreleased	October 13, 2016	
Ashiato Reversi: Kumamon Version	SilverStar	SilverStar	November 12, 2014	Unreleased	Unreleased	Unreleased	
Asonde Shogi ga Tsuyoku Naru Ginsei Shogi DX	SilverStar	SilverStar	July 30, 2015	Unreleased	Unreleased	Unreleased	
Asphalt 3D	Gameloft; Konami	JP: Konami; WW: Ubisoft	March 10, 2011	March 27, 2011	March 31, 2011	March 25, 2011	
Assassination Classroom: Assassin Training Plan	Bandai Namco Games	Bandai Namco Games	March 24, 2016	Unreleased	Unreleased	Unreleased	
Assassination Classroom: Grand Siege on Koro-sensei	Bandai Namco Games	Bandai Namco Games	March 12, 2015	Unreleased	Unreleased	Unreleased	
Asterix: The Mansions of the Gods	Neopica	Bigben Interactive	Unreleased	December 18, 2014	Unreleased	November 28, 2014	
Astro	7 Raven Studios	Enjoy Gaming	Unreleased	September 26, 2013	Unreleased	Unreleased	
Atlantic Quest	Rokapublish	Maximum Games	October 28, 2015	April 15, 2014	Unreleased	June 12, 2014	
Atlantis-6	Igor Gafton	Igor Gafton	October 28, 2015	October 1, 2020	Unreleased	October 15, 2020	
Attack of the Friday Monsters! A Tokyo Tale	Millennium Kitchen; Aquaria	Level-5	March 13, 2013	July 18, 2013	July 18, 2013	July 18, 2013	
Attack on Titan: Humanity in Chains	Spike Chunsoft	Atlus	December 5, 2013	May 12, 2015	July 2, 2015	July 2, 2015	
ATV Wild Ride 3D	Renegade Kid	Renegade Kid	Unreleased	March 7, 2013	Unreleased	Unreleased	
Automaton Lung	Luke Vincent	Luke Vincent	Unreleased	June 23, 2022	Unreleased	Unreleased	
Azada	Big Fish Games	Big Fish Games	Unreleased	May 1, 2014	May 1, 2014	July 12, 2012	
Azito 3D	Astec 21	Hamster Corporation	November 3, 2011	Unreleased	Unreleased	Unreleased	
Azito 3D Kyoto	Astec 21	Hamster Corporation	June 6, 2012	Unreleased	Unreleased	Unreleased	
Azito 3D Osaka	Astec 21	Hamster Corporation	March 6, 2013	Unreleased	Unreleased	Unreleased	
Azito 3D Tokyo	Astec 21	Hamster Corporation	December 5, 2012	Unreleased	Unreleased	Unreleased	
Azure Snake	RandomSpin	RandomSpin	Unreleased	January 24, 2019	Unreleased	January 10, 2019	
Azure Striker Gunvolt	Inti Creates	Inti Creates	August 20, 2014	August 29, 2014	April 2, 2015	April 2, 2015	
Azure Striker Gunvolt 2	Inti Creates	Inti Creates	August 25, 2016	September 30, 2016	September 30, 2016	September 30, 2016	
Back in 1995 64	Throw the Warped Code Out	Throw the Warped Code Out	March 14, 2018	Unreleased	Unreleased	Unreleased	
Balloon Pop Remix	UFO Interactive Games	UFO Interactive Games	Unreleased	September 6, 2012	Unreleased	September 27, 2012	
Banana Bliss: Jungle Puzzles	Teyon	Teyon	May 8, 2013	December 19, 2013	Unreleased	December 19, 2013	
Barbie and her Sisters: Puppy Rescue	Little Orbit	Little Orbit	Unreleased	November 3, 2015	November 15, 2015	November 19, 2015	
Barbie: Dreamhouse Party	Torus Games	Little Orbit	Unreleased	November 12, 2013	November 21, 2013	November 22, 2013	
Barbie: Groom and Glam Pups	Game Machine Studios	Little Orbit	Unreleased	August 15, 2013	Unreleased	August 15, 2013	
Batman: Arkham Origins Blackgate	Armature Studio	Warner Bros. Interactive Entertainment	Unreleased	October 25, 2013	November 6, 2013	November 8, 2013	
Battle Cats Pop!	Ponos	Ponos	May 31, 2015	June 30, 2016	Unreleased	June 30, 2016	
Battle of Elemental REBOOST	Amzy	Amzy	June 29, 2016	Unreleased	Unreleased	Unreleased	
Battleminer	Wobbly Tooth	Wobbly Tooth	February 10, 2016	November 20, 2014	Unreleased	December 11, 2014	
Battleminerz	Wobbly Tooth	Wobbly Tooth	January 17, 2018	December 21, 2017	December 21, 2017	December 21, 2017	
Battleship	Magic Pockets	Activision	Unreleased	May 15, 2012	April 18, 2012	April 20, 2012	
BearShark	Silverball Studios	CollegeHumor	Unreleased	May 2, 2013	Unreleased	June 19, 2014	
Beast Saga: Saikyou Gekiotsu Coliseum	Nippon Columbia	Nippon Columbia	July 25, 2013	Unreleased	Unreleased	Unreleased	
Bella Sara: The Magical Horse Adventures	Eko Software	Bigben Interactive	Unreleased	Unreleased	Unreleased	June 8, 2012	
Bella Sara 2: The Magic of Drasilmare	Eko Software	Bigben Interactive	Unreleased	Unreleased	Unreleased	November 22, 2013	
Ben 10: Galactic Racing	Monkey Bar Games	NA: D3 Publisher; EU: Bandai Namco Games	Unreleased	October 18, 2011	March 15, 2012	November 25, 2011	
Ben 10: Omniverse	1st Playable Productions	NA: D3 Publisher; EU: Bandai Namco Games	Unreleased	November 13, 2012	November 29, 2012	November 30, 2012	
Ben 10: Omniverse 2	1st Playable Productions	NA: D3 Publisher; EU: Bandai Namco Games	Unreleased	November 5, 2013	November 28, 2013	November 22, 2013	
Best Friends: My Horse 3D	Interactive Arts	NA: Gamers Digital; EU: Treva Entertainment	Unreleased	April 30, 2015	Unreleased	March 26, 2015	
Best of Arcade Games	Neko Entertainment	Bigben Interactive	Unreleased	January 29, 2015	Unreleased	March 5, 2015	
Best of Board Games	Neko Entertainment	Bigben Interactive	Unreleased	January 29, 2015	Unreleased	March 5, 2015	
Best of Casual Games	Neko Entertainment	Bigben Interactive	Unreleased	March 5, 2015	Unreleased	March 5, 2015	
Best of Mahjong	GameOn	GameOn	Unreleased	January 15, 2015	Unreleased	December 25, 2014	
Best of Solitaire	GameOn	GameOn	Unreleased	January 8, 2015	Unreleased	December 25, 2014	
Beyblade Burst	FuRyu	FuRyu	November 10, 2016	Unreleased	Unreleased	Unreleased	
Beyblade Burst BeyLogger Plus & Puzzle	FuRyu	FuRyu	March 15, 2017	Unreleased	Unreleased	Unreleased	
Beyblade Burst God	FuRyu	FuRyu	November 23, 2017	Unreleased	Unreleased	Unreleased	
Beyblade: Evolution	SIMS Co., Ltd.	JP: Intergrow; WW: Rising Star Games	December 19, 2013	October 29, 2013	October 24, 2013	October 4, 2013	
Beyond the Labyrinth	tri-Ace	Konami	January 19, 2012	Unreleased	Unreleased	Unreleased	
Bibi & Tina	Kiddinx	Kiddinx	Unreleased	Unreleased	Unreleased	February 27, 2014	
Bibi Blocksberg - Das große Hexenbesen-Rennen 2	Kiddinx	Kiddinx	Unreleased	Unreleased	Unreleased	November 19, 2014	
Big Bass Arcade: No Limit	Big John Games	Big John Games	October 30, 2013	June 13, 2013	Unreleased	August 2, 2018	
Big Hero 6: Battle in the Bay	1st Playable Productions	JP: Bergsala Lightweight; NA: GameMill Entertainment; EU: Avanquest Software	December 10, 2015	October 28, 2014	December 9, 2014	January 23, 2015	
Bike Rider DX	Spicysoft	Spicysoft	December 26, 2012	August 1, 2013	Unreleased	August 15, 2013	
Bike Rider DX2: Galaxy	Spicysoft	Spicysoft	December 18, 2013	July 3, 2014	Unreleased	July 9, 2015	
Bikkuri! Tobidasu! Mahou no Pen	GAE	GAE	August 11, 2011	Unreleased	Unreleased	Unreleased	
Bikkuriman Kanjuku Haoh: Sanmi Douran Sensouki	Nippon Ichi Software	Nippon Ichi Software	July 21, 2011	Unreleased	Unreleased	Unreleased	
Binding of Isaac: Rebirth	Nicalis	Nicalis	October 28, 2015	July 23, 2015	October 29, 2015	October 29, 2015	
Bingo Collection	SIMS Co., Ltd.	Starsign	March 9, 2016	April 13, 2017	Unreleased	Unreleased	
Bird Mania 3D	Teyon	Teyon	December 19, 2012	May 3, 2012	Unreleased	May 17, 2012	
Bird Mania Christmas 3D	Teyon	Teyon	March 5, 2014	December 26, 2013	Unreleased	December 26, 2013	
Bit Boy!! Arcade	Bplus	Bplus	Unreleased	April 17, 2014	Unreleased	April 24, 2014	
Bit Dungeon Plus	Dolores Entertainment	Dolores Entertainment	December 20, 2017	July 13, 2017	Unreleased	Unreleased	
Bit.Trip Saga	Gaijin Games	PAL: Rising Star Games; WW: Aksys Games	July 10, 2013	September 13, 2011	April 25, 2013	March 23, 2012	
Biyoushi Debut Monogatari: Top Sutairisuto o Mezasou!	FuRyu	FuRyu	March 29, 2018	Unreleased	Unreleased	Unreleased	
Blast 'Em Bunnies	Nnooo	Nnooo	Unreleased	March 10, 2016	March 10, 2016	March 10, 2016	
Blaster Master Zero	Inti Creates	Inti Creates	March 3, 2017	March 9, 2017	March 9, 2017	March 9, 2017	
Blasting Agent: Ultimate Edition	Ratalaika Games	Ratalaika Games	March 29, 2017	August 18, 2016	Unreleased	August 18, 2016	
BlazBlue: Clone Phantasma	Arc System Works	Arc System Works	December 26, 2012	August 21, 2014	Unreleased	Unreleased	
BlazBlue: Continuum Shift II	Arc System Works	JP: Arc System Works; WW: Aksys Games	March 31, 2011	May 31, 2011	March 16, 2012	November 4, 2011	
Block-a-Pix Color	Lightwood Games	Lightwood Games	August 8, 2018	May 17, 2018	Unreleased	May 17, 2018	
Block Factory	Enjoy Gaming	Enjoy Gaming	Unreleased	April 26, 2012	Unreleased	April 26, 2012	
BlockForm	CW-Games	CW-Games	Unreleased	October 13, 2016	Unreleased	August 25, 2016	
Blok Drop Chaos	RCMADIAX	RCMADIAX	Unreleased	December 14, 2017	December 14, 2017	December 14, 2017	
Bloo Kid 2	JP: Teyon; WW: winterworks	JP: Teyon; WW: winterworks	October 21, 2015	May 7, 2015	May 7, 2015	May 7, 2015	
Bloodstained: Curse of the Moon	Inti Creates	Inti Creates	May 24, 2018	May 23, 2018	Unreleased	May 31, 2018	
Bloody Vampire	Silver Star	Silver Star; Agetec	April 25, 2012	January 31, 2013	May 9, 2013	May 9, 2013	
Boku no Hero Academia: Battle for All	Dimps Corporation	Bandai Namco Games	May 19, 2016	Unreleased	Unreleased	Unreleased	
Boku wa Koukuu Kanseikan: Airport Hero 3D Haneda All Stars	Sonic Powered	Sonic Powered	April 30, 2015	Unreleased	Unreleased	Unreleased	
Boku wa Koukuu Kanseikan: Airport Hero 3D Kankuu All Stars	Sonic Powered	Sonic Powered	December 17, 2015	Unreleased	Unreleased	Unreleased	
Boku wa Koukuu Kanseikan: Airport Hero 3D Naha Premium	Sonic Powered	Sonic Powered	August 8, 2013	Unreleased	Unreleased	Unreleased	
Boku wa Koukuu Kanseikan: Airport Hero 3D Narita All Stars	Sonic Powered	Sonic Powered	December 25, 2014	Unreleased	Unreleased	Unreleased	
Boku wa Koukuu Kanseikan: Airport Hero 3D Shin Chitose with JAL	Sonic Powered	Sonic Powered	December 19, 2013	Unreleased	Unreleased	Unreleased	
Boku wa Koukuu Kanseikan: Airport Hero 3D Haneda with JAL	Sonic Powered	Sonic Powered	May 24, 2012	Unreleased	Unreleased	Unreleased	
Bokura no Gakkou Sensou: Tsuukai Adventure	D3 Publisher	D3 Publisher	September 30, 2015	Unreleased	Unreleased	Unreleased	
Bokura no Nanokakan Sensou: Yuujou Adventure	D3 Publisher	D3 Publisher	April 15, 2015	Unreleased	Unreleased	Unreleased	
Bomb Monkey	Renegade Kid	Renegade Kid	Unreleased	June 28, 2012	Unreleased	Unreleased	
Bonbon Ribbon: Tokimeki Coord Kirakira Dance	Rocket Company	Rocket Company	August 6, 2015	Unreleased	Unreleased	Unreleased	
Bonds of the Skies	Hit Point	Kemco	October 11, 2017	November 9, 2017	Unreleased	November 9, 2017	
B.O.O.L: Master Labyrinth Puzzle	Michael Wührer	Michael Wührer	Unreleased	November 12, 2020	Unreleased	January 7, 2021	
Boulder Dash-XL 3D	Giant Media Group	Giant Media Group	January 8, 2014	March 27, 2012	Unreleased	June 22, 2012	
Bowling Bonanza 3D	Enjoy Gaming	Enjoy Gaming	Unreleased	May 16, 2013	Unreleased	October 24, 2013	
BoxBoy!	HAL Laboratory	Nintendo	January 14, 2015	April 2, 2015	April 2, 2015	April 2, 2015	
BoxBoxBoy!	HAL Laboratory	Nintendo	January 6, 2016	June 30, 2016	June 30, 2016	June 30, 2016	
Box Up	RCMADIAX	JP: Cosen; WW: RCMADIAX	April 26, 2017	October 27, 2016	October 27, 2016	October 28, 2016	
Boxzle	Pouncing Kitten Games	Pouncing Kitten Games	Unreleased	April 10, 2014	Unreleased	Unreleased	
Brain Age: Concentration Training	Nintendo SPD	Nintendo	July 28, 2012	February 10, 2013	July 29, 2017	July 28, 2017	
Brain Training 3D	IE Institute	Funbox Media, IE Institute	April 7, 2011	Unreleased	Unreleased	October 25, 2013	
Bratz: Fashion Boutique	Activision	Activision	Unreleased	October 30, 2012	Unreleased	Unreleased	
Brave Company	Cattle Call	Namco Bandai Games	October 27, 2011	Unreleased	Unreleased	Unreleased	
Brave Dungeon	Inside System	Inside System	November 30, 2016	March 30, 2017	Unreleased	March 2, 2017	
Brave Tank Hero	Arc System Works	Natsume Inc.	Unreleased	August 11, 2015	Unreleased	September 24, 2015	
Bravely Default	Silicon Studio	JP: Square Enix; WW: Nintendo	October 11, 2012	February 7, 2014	December 7, 2013	December 6, 2013	
Bravely Second: End Layer	Silicon Studio	JP: Square Enix; WW: Nintendo	April 23, 2015	April 15, 2016	February 27, 2016	February 26, 2016	
Breakout Defender	nuGAME	nuGAME	Unreleased	August 22, 2019	Unreleased	September 13, 2019	
Breakout Defender 2	nuGAME	nuGAME	Unreleased	October 17, 2019	Unreleased	Unreleased	
Breakout Defense	nuGAME	nuGAME	Unreleased	September 6, 2018	Unreleased	August 2, 2018	
Breakout Defense 2	nuGAME	nuGAME	Unreleased	November 23, 2017	Unreleased	November 15, 2018	
Brick Race	RCMADIAX	JP: Cosen; WW: RCMADIAX	May 17, 2017	August 18, 2016	August 18, 2016	August 18, 2016	
Brick Thru	RCMADIAX	RCMADIAX	Unreleased	March 8, 2018	Unreleased	March 1, 2018	
Bricks Defender	nuGAME	nuGAME	Unreleased	September 17, 2020	Unreleased	January 16, 2020	
Bricks Defender 2	nuGAME	nuGAME	Unreleased	October 29, 2020	Unreleased	February 13, 2020	
Bricks Defender 3	nuGAME	nuGAME	Unreleased	October 29, 2020	Unreleased	January 16, 2021	
Bricks Defender 4	nuGAME	nuGAME	Unreleased	February 4, 2021	Unreleased	Unreleased	
Bricks Defender 5	nuGAME	nuGAME	Unreleased	February 18, 2021	Unreleased	Unreleased	
Bricks Pinball	nuGAME	nuGAME	Unreleased	October 15, 2020	Unreleased	January 16, 2020	
Bricks Pinball 2	nuGAME	nuGAME	Unreleased	November 19, 2020	Unreleased	February 20, 2020	
Bricks Pinball 3	nuGAME	nuGAME	Unreleased	December 3, 2020	Unreleased	January 16, 2020	
Bricks Pinball 4	nuGAME	nuGAME	Unreleased	January 28, 2021	Unreleased	Unreleased	
Bricks Pinball 5	nuGAME	nuGAME	Unreleased	February 25, 2021	Unreleased	Unreleased	
Bricks Pinball 6	nuGAME	nuGAME	Unreleased	March 11, 2021	Unreleased	Unreleased	
Brilliant Hamsters!	Bergsala Lightweight	Bergsala Lightweight	July 18, 2013	December 5, 2013	Unreleased	January 30, 2014	
Brunch Panic	F K Digital	Circle Entertainment	September 11, 2013	October 17, 2013	Unreleased	November 7, 2013	
Brunswick Pro Bowling	FarSight Studios	Crave Entertainment	Unreleased	September 27, 2011	Unreleased	Unreleased	
Brutus & Futee	Artefacts Studio	Microids	Unreleased	Unreleased	Unreleased	December 25, 2014	
Bubble Pop World	Cypronia	Cypronia	Unreleased	March 13, 2014	Unreleased	April 3, 2014	
Bugs vs. Tanks	Comcept	Level-5	March 19, 2013	June 20, 2013	June 20, 2013	June 20, 2013	
Bukigami	Takara Tomy	Takara Tomy	July 30, 2014	Unreleased	Unreleased	Unreleased	
Bust-a-Move Universe	Arika; Taito Corporation	Square Enix	February 26, 2011	March 27, 2011	April 21, 2011	April 22, 2011	
Bye-Bye BoxBoy!	HAL Laboratory	Nintendo	February 2, 2017	April 12, 2017	March 24, 2017	March 23, 2017	
Cake-ya San Monogatari: Ooishii Sweets o Tsukurou!	Nippon Columbia	Nippon Columbia	November 9, 2017	Unreleased	Unreleased	Unreleased	
Candy Match 3	Sanuk Games	Bigben Interactive	Unreleased	May 14, 2014	Unreleased	March 8, 2014	
Candy, Please!	Nostatic Software	Nostatic Software	Unreleased	January 26, 2017	Unreleased	January 26, 2017	
Captain America: Super Soldier	High Voltage Software	Sega	Unreleased	October 25, 2011	October 14, 2011	October 21, 2011	
Captain Toad: Treasure Tracker	Nintendo EPD	Nintendo	July 13, 2018	July 13, 2018	July 13, 2018	July 13, 2018	
Cardfight Vanguard: Ride to Victory	FuRyu	FuRyu	April 11, 2013	Unreleased	Unreleased	Unreleased	
Cardfight Vanguard: Rock on Victory	FuRyu	FuRyu	June 5, 2014	Unreleased	Unreleased	Unreleased	
Cardfight Vanguard G: Stride to Victory	FuRyu	FuRyu	January 14, 2016	Unreleased	Unreleased	Unreleased	
Carnival Games: Wild West 3D	Cat Daddy Games	2K Play	Unreleased	November 21, 2011	November 17, 2011	March 2, 2012	
Carps & Dragons	Abylight	Abylight	Unreleased	September 26, 2013	Unreleased	August 22, 2013	
Cars 2	Firebrand Games	Disney Interactive Studios	Unreleased	November 1, 2011	November 10, 2011	November 11, 2011	
Cartoon Network: Battle Crashers	GameMill Entertainment	Magic Pockets	Unreleased	November 8, 2016	November 8, 2016	November 8, 2016	
Cartoon Network: Punch Time Explosion	Papaya Studio	EU: Deep Silver; WW: Crave Entertainment	Unreleased	June 2, 2011	May 17, 2012	November 18, 2011	
Castle Clout 3D	Teyon	Selectsoft	Unreleased	January 30, 2014	Unreleased	May 29, 2014	
Castle Conqueror Defender	Circle Entertainment	JP: Starsign; WW: Circle Entertainment	January 20, 2016	November 13, 2014	Unreleased	December 18, 2014	
Castle Conqueror EX	Circle Entertainment	Circle Entertainment	Unreleased	October 23, 2014	Unreleased	April 28, 2016	
Castlevania: Lords of Shadow – Mirror of Fate	MercurySteam	Konami	March 20, 2013	March 5, 2013	March 9, 2013	March 8, 2013	
Cats & Dogs 3D: Pets at Play	Treva Entertainment	Treva Entertainment	Unreleased	Unreleased	Unreleased	March 30, 2012	
Cave Story	Nicalis	Nicalis	September 30, 2012	October 4, 2015	May 1, 2014	May 1, 2014	
Cave Story 3D	Nicalis	NIS America	July 26, 2012	November 8, 2011	November 24, 2011	November 11, 2011	
Cazzarion	Armin Unold	Zarpazo	Unreleased	January 16, 2020	Unreleased	October 31, 2019	
Cazzarion Adventureland	Zarpazo	Zarpazo	Unreleased	November 12, 2020	Unreleased	January 14, 2021	
Centipede: Infestation	WayForward Technologies	Atari, SA	Unreleased	November 1, 2011	Unreleased	Unreleased	
Chain Blaster	G-Style	Joindots	June 12, 2013	July 25, 2013	Unreleased	September 1, 2016	
Chara Pet Tsukutte! Sodatete! Character Shougakkou	Culture Brain	Culture Brain	November 7, 2013	Unreleased	Unreleased	Unreleased	
Chari-Sou DX3: Time Rider	Spicysoft	Spicysoft	December 17, 2014	Unreleased	Unreleased	Unreleased	
Chase: Cold Case Investigations - Distant Memories	Arc System Works	JP: Arc System Works; WW: Aksys Games	May 11, 2016	October 13, 2016	Unreleased	October 13, 2016	
Chevrolet Camaro Wild Ride	Visual Impact	Storm City Games	Unreleased	September 12, 2011	Unreleased	November 14, 2011	
Chibi * Devi!	Infinity	Alchemist	September 27, 2012	Unreleased	Unreleased	Unreleased	
Chibi * Devi! 2 Mahou no Yume Ehon	Infinity	Alchemist	September 27, 2012	Unreleased	Unreleased	Unreleased	
Chibi-Robo! Photo Finder	Skip Ltd.	Nintendo	July 3, 2013	January 9, 2014	July 3, 2014	July 3, 2014	
Chibi-Robo! Zip Lash	Skip Ltd.; Vanpool	Nintendo	October 8, 2015	October 9, 2015	November 7, 2015	November 6, 2015	
Chicken Wiggle	Atooi	Atooi	Unreleased	August 17, 2017	Unreleased	August 17, 2017	
Chō Soku Henkei Gyrozetter	Noise	Square Enix	June 13, 2013	Unreleased	Unreleased	Unreleased	
Cho~ricchi! Tamagotchi no Puchi Puchi Omisecchi	Bandai Namco Games	Bandai Namco Games	November 16, 2017	Unreleased	Unreleased	Unreleased	
Cho~ricchi! Tamagotchi no Puchi Puchi Omisecchi de Violin Lesson	Bandai NAMCO Games	Bandai NAMCO Games	July 4, 2012	Unreleased	Unreleased	Unreleased	
Choco Ken no Chokotto Fushigi na Monogatari: Chocolate Hime to Mahou no Recipe	Nippon Columbia	Nippon Columbia	October 9, 2014	Unreleased	Unreleased	Unreleased	
Chou Chari-Sou: Atsumete! Choujuu Hunter	Spicysoft Corp.	Spicysoft Corp.	February 24, 2016	Unreleased	Unreleased	Unreleased	
Chou Sentou-chuu Kyuukyoku no Shinobu to Battle Player Choujou Kessen!	Bandai Namco Games	Bandai Namco Games	September 15, 2016	Unreleased	Unreleased	Unreleased	
Chou Tousouchuu Atsumare Saikyou no Tousousya Tachi (Super Run For Money)	Bandai Namco Games	Bandai Namco Games	July 9, 2015	Unreleased	Unreleased	Unreleased	
Choujin Baseball Stadium	Culture Brain Excel	Culture Brain Excel	July 12, 2016	Unreleased	Unreleased	Unreleased	
Choujin Baseball Stadium: Nekketsu Story	Culture Brain Excel	Culture Brain Excel	October 11, 2017	Unreleased	Unreleased	Unreleased	
Choujin Ultra Baseball Action Card Battle	Culture Brain Excel	Culture Brain Excel	March 13, 2014	Unreleased	Unreleased	Unreleased	
Chouju Giga Taisen	Silver Star	Silver Star	May 17, 2017	Unreleased	Unreleased	Unreleased	
Christmas Night Archery	Petite Games	Petite Games	Unreleased	December 7, 2017	Unreleased	December 7, 2017	
Christmas Wonderland 3	Microvalue	Microvalue	Unreleased	November 21, 2013	Unreleased	November 21, 2013	
Christmas Wonderland 4	Microvalue	Microvalue	Unreleased	Unreleased	Unreleased	December 4, 2014	
Chronus Arc	Kemco	Hit Point	August 19, 2015	October 1, 2015	Unreleased	December 17, 2015	
Citizens of Earth	Eden Industries	Atlus	Unreleased	January 22, 2015	Unreleased	January 22, 2015	
City Mysteries	Selectsoft	Selectsoft	Unreleased	July 3, 2014	Unreleased	Unreleased	
City Skaters: Run Boy, Run Girl	Denvzla Estudio	Denvzla Estudio	Unreleased	June 4, 2020	Unreleased	Unreleased	
Classic Card Games	GameOn	GameOn	Unreleased	Unreleased	Unreleased	January 8, 2015	
Classic Games Overload: Card & Puzzle Edition	Telegames	Telegames	Unreleased	November 30, 2012	Unreleased	Unreleased	
Cloudy with a Chance of Meatballs 2	1st Playable Productions	GameMill Entertainment	Unreleased	September 17, 2013	Unreleased	October 11, 2013	
Club Nintendo Picross	Jupiter Corporation	Nintendo	September 13, 2012	Unreleased	Unreleased	Unreleased	
Club Nintendo Picross Plus	Jupiter Corporation	Nintendo	October 9, 2013	Unreleased	Unreleased	Unreleased	
Coaster Creator 3D	Big John Games	Big John Games	July 24, 2013	February 28, 2013	Unreleased	May 29, 2014	
Cocoro: Line Defender	Moving Player	Moving Player	Unreleased	June 26, 2014	Unreleased	June 26, 2014	
Cocoto Alien Brick Breaker	Bigben Interactive	JP: Teyon; WW: Bigben Interactive	October 22, 2014	January 24, 2013	Unreleased	August 17, 2012	
Code Name: S.T.E.A.M.	Intelligent Systems; Nintendo SPD	Nintendo	May 14, 2015	March 14, 2015	May 16, 2015	May 15, 2015	
Code of Princess	Agatsuma Entertainment; Bones	JP: Agatsuma Entertainment; WW: Atlus	April 19, 2012	October 9, 2012	March 28, 2013	March 28, 2013	
Color Cubes	RCMADIAX	RCMADIAX	Unreleased	January 19, 2017	January 19, 2017	January 19, 2017	
Color Zen	Cypronia	Cypronia	Unreleased	June 5, 2014	Unreleased	June 5, 2014	
Color Zen Kids	Cypronia	Cypronia	Unreleased	June 19, 2014	Unreleased	June 19, 2014	
Collide-a-Ball	Sims	Starsign	September 2, 2015	September 15, 2016	Unreleased	November 3, 2016	
Combat of Giants: Dinosaurs 3D	Ubisoft Quebec	Ubisoft	February 26, 2011	March 27, 2011	March 31, 2011	March 31, 2011	
Conception II: Children of the Seven Stars	Spike Chunsoft	JP: Spike Chunsoft; WW: Atlus	August 22, 2013	April 15, 2014	May 15, 2014	May 14, 2014	
Conveni Dream	Arc System Works	Circle Entertainment	September 24, 2014	May 26, 2016	Unreleased	June 24, 2016	
Cooking Mama 4: Kitchen Magic	Cooking Mama Limited	JP: Cooking Mama Limited; NA: Majesco; PAL: 505 Games	December 1, 2011	November 16, 2011	November 24, 2011	November 25, 2011	
Cooking Mama 5: Bon Appétit!	Cooking Mama Limited	JP: Cooking Mama Limited; NA: Majesco; PAL: Nintendo	November 21, 2013	September 16, 2014	March 7, 2015	March 6, 2015	
Cooking Mama: Sweet Shop	Office Create	JP: Office Create; WW: Rising Star Games	November 6, 2014	May 16, 2017	May 19, 2017	May 26, 2017	
Corpse Party	Xseed Games	Xseed Games	July 30, 2015	October 25, 2016	Unreleased	October 26, 2016	
CosmiBall 3D	DESK INC	DESK INC	Unreleased	October 6, 2022	Unreleased	Unreleased	
Crash Time 3D	Synetic	DTP Entertainment	Unreleased	Unreleased	Unreleased	June 19, 2014	
Crashmo •Fallblox^{PAL}	Intelligent Systems	Nintendo	October 31, 2012	November 22, 2012	November 15, 2012	November 15, 2012	
Crayon Shin-Chan: Arashi wo Yobu Kasukabe Eiga Stars!	Bandai Namco Games	Bandai Namco Games	April 10, 2014	Unreleased	Unreleased	Unreleased	
Crayon Shin-Chan: Uchuu de Achoo!? Yuujou no Oba-Karate!!	Inti Creates	Bandai Namco Games	December 1, 2011	Unreleased	Unreleased	Unreleased	
Crayon Shin-Chan Gekiatsu! Oden wa Rudo Dai Konran!!	FuRyu	FuRyu	November 30, 2017	Unreleased	Unreleased	Unreleased	
Crazy Chicken Pirates 3D	Teyon	Teyon	February 27, 2013	August 16, 2012	Unreleased	September 27, 2012	
Crazy Chicken: Director's Cut 3D	Teyon	Teyon	March 19, 2014	November 7, 2013	Unreleased	October 24, 2013	
Crazy Construction	G-Style	G-Style	October 31, 2012	April 25, 2013	Unreleased	October 23, 2014	
Crazy Kangaroo	Gamelion	JP: Teyon; WW: Gamelion	February 13, 2013	October 11, 2012	Unreleased	September 13, 2012	
Creeping Terror	Sushi Typhoon Games	Mebius; Aksys Games	January 18, 2017	October 31, 2017	Unreleased	October 31, 2017	
Crimson Shroud	Level-5	Level-5	November 28, 2012	December 13, 2012	December 13, 2012	December 13, 2012	
Crollors Game Pack	Nvriezen	Nvriezen	Unreleased	July 6, 2017	Unreleased	December 8, 2016	
The Croods: Prehistoric Party!	Torus Games	NA: D3 Publisher; EU: Bandai Namco Games	Unreleased	March 19, 2013	April 11, 2014	April 12, 2013	
Crosswords Plus	Nintendo Software Technology	Nintendo	Unreleased	October 1, 2012	Unreleased	Unreleased	
Crush 3D	Zoë Mode	Sega	February 23, 2012	March 6, 2012	February 9, 2012	January 13, 2012	
Cryght	Toyuro	Toyuro	Unreleased	January 20, 2022	Unreleased	Unreleased	
Crystareino	Kemco	Kemco	August 2, 2017	September 7, 2017	Unreleased	September 7, 2017	
The Cube	Funbox Media	Funbox Media	Unreleased	Unreleased	Unreleased	November 21, 2013	
Cube Creator 3D	Big John Games	Big John Games	July 15, 2015	April 23, 2015	Unreleased	August 20, 2015	
Cube Creator DX	Arc System Works	Arc System Works	April 27, 2017	November 8, 2018	Unreleased	August 1, 2019	
Cube Tactics	FUN UNIT	Teyon	Unreleased	March 13, 2014	Unreleased	March 13, 2014	
Cubic Ninja	AQ Interactive	JP: AQ Interactive; WW: Ubisoft	April 7, 2011	June 14, 2011	June 23, 2011	June 24, 2011	
Cubit the Hardcore Platformer Robot	CoderChild	CoderChild	August 6, 2014	December 26, 2013	Unreleased	March 13, 2014	
Culdcept	Omiya Soft	Nintendo	June 28, 2012	Unreleased	Unreleased	Unreleased	
Culdcept Revolt	OmiyaSoft	JP: Nintendo; WW: NIS America	July 7, 2016	October 3, 2017	October 13, 2017	October 6, 2017	
Cup Critters	RCMADIAX	RCMADIAX	April 12, 2017	December 1, 2016	December 1, 2016	December 1, 2016	
Cursed Castilla	Locomalito	JP: Flyhigh Works; WW: Abylight	July 12, 2017	July 13, 2017	Unreleased	July 13, 2017	
Cut the Rope	Abylight	ZeptoLab	Unreleased	September 19, 2013	Unreleased	August 22, 2013	
Cut the Rope: Triple Treat	Fun Labs	Activision	Unreleased	March 25, 2014	April 25, 2014	March 28, 2014	
Cycle of Eternity: Space Anomaly	RandomSpin	RandomSpin	Unreleased	April 19, 2018	Unreleased	March 8, 2018	
D.U.N.K.L.E.R	Guy Saldanha	Guy Saldanha	Unreleased	Unreleased	Unreleased	June 9, 2022	
Dai Gyakuten Saiban: Naruhodō Ryūnosuke no Bōken	Capcom	Capcom	July 9, 2015	Unreleased	Unreleased	Unreleased	
Dai Gyakuten Saiban 2: Naruhodō Ryūnosuke no Kakugo	Capcom	Capcom	August 3, 2017	Unreleased	Unreleased	Unreleased	
Daigasso! Band Brothers P	Intelligent Systems	Nintendo	November 14, 2013	Unreleased	Unreleased	Unreleased	
Daigasso! Band Brothers P Debut	Intelligent Systems	Nintendo	July 22, 2015	Unreleased	Unreleased	Unreleased	
Daisenryaku Daitoua Koboshi DX: Dainiji Sekai Taisen	SystemSoft Alpha	SystemSoft Alpha	May 23, 2019	Unreleased	Unreleased	Unreleased	
Dakkan Shirei Majo Dungeon: Shuu no Tame Nara Yara Nebanarumai	AMZY	AMZY	August 6, 2014	Unreleased	Unreleased	Unreleased	
Dan McFox: Head Hunter	Lightwood Games	Lightwood Games	Unreleased	June 9, 2016	Unreleased	April 21, 2016	
Danball Senki W Chou Custom	Level 5	Level 5	July 18, 2013	Unreleased	Unreleased	Unreleased	
Danball Senki W Chou Custom	Level 5	Level 5	October 31, 2013	Unreleased	Unreleased	Unreleased	
Dangerous Jiisan to 1000-nin no Otomodachi Ja	Bandai Namco Games	Bandai Namco Games	November 22, 2012	Unreleased	Unreleased	Unreleased	
Dangerous Road	Sims	Starsign	Unreleased	November 10, 2016	Unreleased	Unreleased	
Dark Island	Vadim Gafton	Random Spin	Unreleased	October 15, 2020	Unreleased	October 22, 2020	
Darts Up 3D	EnjoyUp Games	EnjoyUp Games	Unreleased	September 5, 2013	Unreleased	September 5, 2013	
Dasshutsu Adventure: Akumu no Shinigami Ressha	Intense	Arc System Works	December 4, 2013	Unreleased	Unreleased	Unreleased	
Dasshutsu Adventure: Dai Nana no Yogen	Intense	Arc System Works	September 28, 2016	Unreleased	Unreleased	Unreleased	
Dasshutsu Adventure: Kami Oroshi no Uranai Ban	Intense	Arc System Works	December 22, 2015	Unreleased	Unreleased	Unreleased	
Dasshutsu: Kyuukousha no Shojo	Intense	Arc System Works	August 1, 2012	Unreleased	Unreleased	Unreleased	
Dasshutsu Adventure: Majo no Sumu Yakata	Intense	Arc System Works	December 19, 2012	Unreleased	Unreleased	Unreleased	
Dasshutsu Adventure: Noroi no Suuretsu	Intense	Arc System Works	April 22, 2015	Unreleased	Unreleased	Unreleased	
Dasshutsu Adventure: Shiawase no Akai Ishi	Intense	Arc System Works	April 30, 2014	Unreleased	Unreleased	Unreleased	
Dasshutsu Adventure: Shuuen no Kuroikiri	Intense	Arc System Works	August 27, 2014	Unreleased	Unreleased	Unreleased	
Dasshutsu Adventure: Zetsubou Yousai	Intense	Arc System Works	July 16, 2016	Unreleased	Unreleased	Unreleased	
Dasshutsu Fantasy: Alice in Escape Land	Intense	Arc System Works	March 9, 2016	Unreleased	Unreleased	Unreleased	
Dead or Alive: Dimensions	Team Ninja	PAL: Nintendo; WW: Tecmo Koei	May 19, 2011	May 24, 2011	May 26, 2011	May 20, 2011	
Deca Sports Extreme	Hudson Soft	Konami	April 28, 2011	September 20, 2011	June 2, 2011	June 9, 2011	
Dedede's Drum Dash Deluxe	HAL Laboratory	Nintendo	July 23, 2014	August 29, 2014	February 13, 2015	February 13, 2015	
Defend Your Crypt	Ratalaika Games	JP: Starsign; WW: Ratalaika Games	December 28, 2016	July 21, 2016	Unreleased	July 21, 2016	
Deer Drive Legends	Raylight Studios	Maximum Games	Unreleased	May 27, 2012	Unreleased	August 8, 2013	
Deer Hunting King •Shika Kari-O^{JP}	Arc System Works	Arc System Works	December 28, 2011	July 4, 2014	Unreleased	Unreleased	
The Delusions of Von Sottendorff and His Square Mind	Delirium Studios	Delirium Studios	Unreleased	December 17, 2015	Unreleased	December 17, 2015	
Dementium: Remastered	Renegade Kid	Renegade Kid	Unreleased	December 3, 2015	Unreleased	February 11, 2016	
Demon King Box	Circle Entertainment	Circle Entertainment; Lanan	Unreleased	August 21, 2014	Unreleased	September 25, 2014	
The Denpa Men: They Came By Wave	Genius Sonority	Genius Sonority	February 8, 2012	September 27, 2012	December 6, 2012	December 6, 2012	
The Denpa Men 2: Beyond the Waves	Genius Sonority	Genius Sonority	September 26, 2012	May 30, 2013	May 30, 2013	May 30, 2013	
The Denpa Men 3: The Rise of the Digitoll	Genius Sonority	Genius Sonority	August 7, 2013	May 8, 2014	May 8, 2014	May 8, 2014	
The Denpa Men RPG Free!	Genius Sonority	Genius Sonority	July 23, 2014	Unreleased	Unreleased	Unreleased	
Densha Unten Shirei! Toukaidou-Hen	Arc System Works	Arc System Works	April 27, 2016	Unreleased	Unreleased	Unreleased	
Densha Unten Shirei! Toukyouwan-Hen	Arc System Works	Arc System Works	January 11, 2017	Unreleased	Unreleased	Unreleased	
Derby Stallion Gold	Parity Bit	Kadokawa Games	December 4, 2014	Unreleased	Unreleased	Unreleased	
Detective Pikachu	Creatures	Nintendo; The Pokémon Company	February 3, 2016	March 23, 2018	March 24, 2018	March 23, 2018	
Die drei ??? Kids - Jagd auf das Phantom	Independent Arts	United Soft Media	Unreleased	Unreleased	Unreleased	November 28, 2014	
Digger Dan EX	Four Horses	Four Horses	Unreleased	May 19, 2016	Unreleased	May 19, 2016	
Digimon Universe: Appli Monsters	Inti Creates	Bandai Namco Entertainment	December 1, 2016	Unreleased	Unreleased	Unreleased	
Digimon World Re:Digitize Decode	Tri-Crescendo	Bandai Namco Games	June 27, 2013	Unreleased	Unreleased	Unreleased	
Dillon's Dead-Heat Breakers	Vanpool	Nintendo	April 26, 2018	May 24, 2018	May 26, 2018	May 25, 2018	
Dillon's Rolling Western	Vanpool	Nintendo	February 22, 2012	February 22, 2012	February 22, 2012	February 22, 2012	
Dillon's Rolling Western: The Last Ranger	Vanpool	Nintendo	April 10, 2013	April 11, 2013	June 27, 2013	June 27, 2013	
Disney Infinity: Toy Box Challenge	Altron	JP: Bandai Namco Games; WW: Disney Interactive Studios	November 28, 2013	August 18, 2013	August 22, 2013	August 20, 2013	
Disney Magical World	h.a.n.d.; Bandai Namco Games	JP: Bandai Namco Games; WW: Nintendo	August 1, 2013	April 11, 2014	October 25, 2014	October 24, 2014	
Disney Magical World 2	h.a.n.d.; Bandai Namco Games	JP: Bandai Namco Entertainment; WW: Nintendo	November 8, 2015	October 14, 2016	October 15, 2016	October 14, 2016	
Disney Princess: My Fairytale Adventure	High Impact Games	Disney Interactive Studios	Unreleased	September 25, 2012	November 1, 2012	August 17, 2012	
Disney Violetta Rhythm & Music	Game Machine Studios	Little Orbit	Unreleased	December 4, 2014	Unreleased	September 26, 2014	
Doctor Lautrec and the Forgotten Knights	Konami; Winkysoft	Konami	July 7, 2011	December 6, 2011	November 24, 2011	November 25, 2011	
DodgeBox	Bidement Entertainment	Bidement Entertainment	Unreleased	May 18, 2017	Unreleased	Unreleased	
Dodge Club Pocket	James Montagna	James Montagna	Unreleased	March 29, 2018	April 19, 2018	April 19, 2018	
Dog School: Lovely Puppy	Starfish SD	Starfish SD	November 3, 2011	Unreleased	Unreleased	Unreleased	
Dogimegi Inryoku-Chan	Arc System Works	Arc System Works	May 29, 2013	Unreleased	Unreleased	Unreleased	
DokiDoki! PreCure Narikiri Life!	Bandai Namco Games	Bandai Namco Games	August 1, 2013	Unreleased	Unreleased	Unreleased	
Dolly Kanon Dokidoki Tokimeki Himitsu no Ongaku Katsudou Start Desu!!	Happinet	Happinet	November 20, 2014	Unreleased	Unreleased	Unreleased	
Don't Crash Go	RCMADIAX	RCMADIAX	Unreleased	April 20, 2017	March 16, 2017	March 16, 2017	
Donkey Kong Country Returns 3D	Retro Studios; Monster Games	Nintendo	June 13, 2013	May 24, 2013	May 25, 2013	May 24, 2013	
Doodle Jump Adventures	Smoking Gun Interactive	NA: GameMill Entertainment; EU: Avanquest Software	Unreleased	October 29, 2013	November 5, 2013	November 5, 2013	
Dooors	Pumo	Pumo	December 3, 2014	April 16, 2015	Unreleased	Unreleased	
Dopamix	G-Mode	G-Mode	March 14, 2012	Unreleased	Unreleased	Unreleased	
Dora-Chie: Mini-Dora Ongakutai to 7-tsu no Chie	Jupiter Corporation	Shogakukan	November 14, 2013	Unreleased	Unreleased	Unreleased	
DoraEigo: Nobita to Yousei no Fushigi Collection	Jupiter Corporation	Shogakukan	November 20, 2014	Unreleased	Unreleased	Unreleased	
Doraemon: Nobita no Himitsu Dougu Hakubutsukan	FuRyu	FuRyu	March 7, 2013	Unreleased	Unreleased	Unreleased	
Doraemon: Nobita no Nankyoku Kachikochi Daibouken	FuRyu	FuRyu	March 2, 2017	Unreleased	Unreleased	Unreleased	
Doraemon: Nobita no Space Heroes	FuRyu	FuRyu	March 5, 2015	Unreleased	Unreleased	Unreleased	
Doraemon: Nobita no Takarajima	FuRyu	FuRyu	March 1, 2018	Unreleased	Unreleased	Unreleased	
Doraemon: Nobita and the Island of Miracles—Animal Adventure	FuRyu	FuRyu	March 1, 2012	Unreleased	Unreleased	Unreleased	
Doraemon: Shin Nobita no Daimakyou	FuRyu	FuRyu	March 6, 2014	Unreleased	Unreleased	Unreleased	
Doraemon: Shin Nobita no Nihontanjou	FuRyu	FuRyu	March 3, 2016	Unreleased	Unreleased	Unreleased	
DoraKazu: Nobita no Suuji Daibouken	Jupiter Corporation	Shogakukan	July 19, 2012	Unreleased	Unreleased	Unreleased	
DoraMoji: Nobita no Kanji Daisakusen	Jupiter Corporation	Shogakukan	February 26, 2015	Unreleased	Unreleased	Unreleased	
Dot Runner: Complete Edition	Intense	Intense	September 14, 2011	July 26, 2012	Unreleased	September 20, 2012	
Double Breakout	nuGAME	nuGAME	Unreleased	September 6, 2018	Unreleased	August 9, 2018	
Doubutsu Sentai Zyuohger: Battle Cube Puzzle	Bandai Namco Games	Bandai Namco Games	September 7, 2016	Unreleased	Unreleased	Unreleased	
Doukutsujima	SmileBoom	SmileBoom	May 17, 2017	Unreleased	Unreleased	Unreleased	
Downtown Nekketsu Jidaigeki	Arc System Works	Arc System Works	May 28, 2015	Unreleased	Unreleased	Unreleased	
Downtown no Gaki no Tsukai Yaarahen de!! Zettai ni Tsukamatte Haikenai Gasu Kurobikari Land	Planet G	Alchemist	December 17, 2015	Unreleased	Unreleased	Unreleased	
Dr. Mario: Miracle Cure	Tose	Nintendo	May 31, 2015	June 11, 2015	June 11, 2015	June 11, 2015	
Dragon Ball Fusions	Ganbarion	Bandai Namco Entertainment	August 4, 2016	November 22, 2016	February 17, 2017	February 17, 2017	
Dragon Ball Heroes: Ultimate Mission	Bandai Namco Games	Bandai Namco Games	February 28, 2013	Unreleased	Unreleased	Unreleased	
Dragon Ball Heroes: Ultimate Mission 2	Bandai Namco Games	Bandai Namco Games	August 7, 2014	Unreleased	Unreleased	Unreleased	
Dragon Ball Heroes: Ultimate Mission X	Bandai Namco Games	Bandai Namco Games	April 27, 2017	Unreleased	Unreleased	Unreleased	
Dragon Ball Z: Extreme Butōden	Bandai Namco Games	Bandai Namco Games	June 11, 2015	October 20, 2015	October 16, 2015	October 16, 2015	
Dragon Fang	Toydea	Toydea	December 14, 2016	Unreleased	Unreleased	Unreleased	
Dragon Fang Z: Ryuusha Rose to Yadorigi no Meikyuu	Toydea	Toydea	December 23, 2019	Unreleased	Unreleased	Unreleased	
Dragon Fantasy: The Black Tome of Ice	Muteki Corporation	Choice Provisions	Unreleased	May 26, 2016	Unreleased	Unreleased	
Dragon Fantasy: The Volumes of Westeria	Muteki Corporation	Choice Provisions	Unreleased	July 23, 2015	Unreleased	Unreleased	
Dragon Lapis	Kemco	Kemco	April 18, 2018	May 31, 2018	Unreleased	May 31, 2018	
Dragon Quest	Square Enix	Square Enix	August 10, 2017	Unreleased	Unreleased	Unreleased	
Dragon Quest II	Square Enix	Square Enix	August 10, 2017	Unreleased	Unreleased	Unreleased	
Dragon Quest III	Square Enix	Square Enix	August 24, 2017	Unreleased	Unreleased	Unreleased	
Dragon Quest VII	ArtePiazza	JPSquare Enix: WWNintendo	February 7, 2013	September 16, 2016	September 17, 2016	September 16, 2016	
Dragon Quest VIII	Level-5	Square Enix	August 27, 2015	January 20, 2017	January 21, 2017	January 20, 2017	
Dragon Quest X	Square Enix	Square Enix	December 12, 2012	Unreleased	Unreleased	Unreleased	
Dragon Quest X: Odekake Moshasu de Battle	Square Enix	Square Enix	December 12, 2012	Unreleased	Unreleased	Unreleased	
Dragon Quest XI	Square Enix; Armor Project	Square Enix	July 29, 2017	Unreleased	Unreleased	Unreleased	
Dragon Quest Monsters: Joker 3	Square Enix	Square Enix	March 24, 2016	Unreleased	Unreleased	Unreleased	
Dragon Quest Monsters: Joker 3 Professional	Square Enix	Square Enix	February 9, 2017	Unreleased	Unreleased	Unreleased	
Dragon Quest Monsters: Terry's Wonderland 3D	Square Enix	Square Enix	May 31, 2012	Unreleased	Unreleased	Unreleased	
Dragon Quest Monsters 2: Iru and Luca's Marvelous Mysterious Key	Square Enix	Square Enix	February 6, 2014	Unreleased	Unreleased	Unreleased	
Dragon Sinker	Kemco	Kemco	February 15, 2017	April 6, 2017	Unreleased	April 6, 2017	
Dragon's Wrath	Codeglue	Gamers Digital	Unreleased	January 17, 2019	Unreleased	Unreleased	
Drancia Saga	Urara-works	JP: Flyhigh Works; WW: Circle Entertainment	September 2, 2016	May 18, 2017	Unreleased	May 25, 2017	
Dream Girl Premier	Alchemist	Alchemist	November 19, 2015	Unreleased	Unreleased	Unreleased	
Dream Trigger 3D	Art	NA: D3 Publisher; WW: Bandai Namco Games	Unreleased	May 10, 2011	August 4, 2011	July 15, 2011	
DreamWorks Madagascar 3: The Video Game	Torus Games	NA: D3 Publisher; WW: Bandai Namco Games	August 2, 2012	June 5, 2012	September 6, 2012	October 12, 2012	
DreamWorks Super Star Kartz	High Impact Games	Activision	Unreleased	November 15, 2011	Unreleased	November 18, 2011	
Dreeps: Alarm Playing Game	Mebius	Mebius	June 27, 2018	Unreleased	Unreleased	Unreleased	
Dress to Play: Cute Witches!	CoderChild	JP: Starsign; WW: EnjoyUp Games	April 16, 2014	November 8, 2012	Unreleased	November 22, 2012	
Dress to Play: Magic Bubbles!	CoderChild	JP: Starsign; WW: EnjoyUp Games	April 30, 2014	May 16, 2013	Unreleased	July 4, 2013	
Driver: Renegade	VD-dev	Ubisoft	November 10, 2011	September 6, 2011	September 1, 2011	September 2, 2011	
Drone Fight	Silver Star	NA: Circle Entertainment; WW: Silver Star	December 28, 2016	May 25, 2017	Unreleased	June 1, 2017	
Drop Zone: Under Fire	Teyon	Selectsoft	Unreleased	January 29, 2015	Unreleased	Unreleased	
DualPenSports	indieszero	Bandai Namco Games	June 2, 2011	June 21, 2011	September 22, 2011	September 2, 2011	
Duck Dynasty	Activision	Activision	Unreleased	October 14, 2014	Unreleased	Unreleased	
Dungeon Runner	Denvzla Estudio	Denvzla Estudio	Unreleased	July 2, 2020	Unreleased	Unreleased	
Earthpedia	Gakken	Gakken	April 19, 2012	Unreleased	Unreleased	Unreleased	
Edge	Two Tribes	Two Tribes	June 4, 2014	December 26, 2013	Unreleased	December 26, 2013	
Elliot Quest	Ansimuz Games	PlayEveryWare Games	Unreleased	May 11, 2017	Unreleased	May 11, 2017	
Elminage Gothic 3D Remix: Ulm Zakir to Yami no Gishiki	Starfish SD	Starfish SD	September 5, 2013	Unreleased	Unreleased	Unreleased	
Elminage Ibun: Ame no Mihashira Kai	Starfish SD	Starfish SD	November 13, 2014	Unreleased	Unreleased	Unreleased	
Elminage II: Sousei no Megami to Unmei no Daichi	Joyful Table	Joyful Table	March 22, 2017	Unreleased	Unreleased	Unreleased	
Elminage III: Ankoku no Shito to Taiyou no Kyuuden	Joyful Table	Joyful Table	July 12, 2017	Unreleased	Unreleased	Unreleased	
Elminage Original	Joyful Table	JP: Joyful Table; WW: Rising Star Games	December 14, 2016	August 10, 2017	Unreleased	Unreleased	
Epic Mickey: Power of Illusion	DreamRift	JP: Spike Chunsoft; WW: Disney Interactive Studios	September 26, 2013	November 18, 2012	November 22, 2012	November 23, 2012	
Epic Word Search Collection	Lightwood Games	Lightwood Games	Unreleased	June 23, 2015	Unreleased	January 28, 2016	
Epic Word Search Collection 2	Lightwood Games	Lightwood Games	Unreleased	May 26, 2016	Unreleased	May 26, 2016	
Epic Word Search Holiday Special	Lightwood Games	Lightwood Games	Unreleased	October 6, 2016	Unreleased	October 6, 2016	
Escape From Forest	RandomSpin	Vadim Gafton	Unreleased	August 6, 2020	Unreleased	October 15, 2020	
Escape From Zombie City	Tom Create	Tom Create	July 18, 2012	October 10, 2013	Unreleased	October 29, 2013	
escapeVektor	Nnooo	Nnooo	December 11, 2013	December 20, 2012	Unreleased	December 20, 2012	
Etrian Mystery Dungeon	Atlus; Spike Chunsoft	Atlus	March 5, 2015	April 7, 2015	September 17, 2015	September 11, 2015	
Etrian Mystery Dungeon 2	Atlus; Spike Chunsoft	Atlus	August 31, 2017	Unreleased	Unreleased	Unreleased	
Etrian Odyssey IV: Legends of the Titan	Atlus	JP: Atlus; NA: Atlus USA; PAL: NIS America	July 5, 2012	February 26, 2013	September 5, 2013	August 30, 2013	
Etrian Odyssey V: Beyond the Myth	Atlus	JP: Atlus; NA: Atlus USA	August 4, 2016	October 17, 2017	November 3, 2017	November 3, 2017	
Etrian Odyssey Nexus	Atlus	Atlus	August 2, 2018	February 5, 2019	Unreleased	February 5, 2019	
Etrian Odyssey Untold: The Millennium Girl	Atlus	EU: NIS America; WW: Atlus	June 27, 2013	October 1, 2013	Unreleased	May 2, 2014	
Etrian Odyssey Untold 2: The Fafnir Knight	Atlus	EU: NIS America; WW: Atlus	November 27, 2014	August 4, 2015	Unreleased	February 12, 2016	
European Conqueror 3D	Circle Entertainment	Circle Entertainment	Unreleased	June 19, 2014	Unreleased	September 4, 2014	
Ever Oasis	Grezzo	Nintendo	July 13, 2017	June 23, 2017	June 24, 2017	June 23, 2017	
E.X. Troopers	Capcom	Capcom	November 22, 2012	Unreleased	Unreleased	Unreleased	
Excave	Mechanic Arms	JP: Mechanic Arms; WW: Teyon	November 27, 2013	February 19, 2015	Unreleased	March 26, 2015	
Excave II: Wizard of the Underworld	Mechanic Arms	JP: Mechanic Arms; WW: Bergsala Lightweight	July 16, 2014	April 2, 2015	Unreleased	April 30, 2015	
Excave III: Tower of Destiny	Mechanic Arms	JP: Mechanic Arms; WW: Bergsala Lightweight	January 28, 2015	April 14, 2016	Unreleased	February 25, 2016	
Exstetra	FuRyu	FuRyu	November 7, 2013	Unreleased	Unreleased	Unreleased	
EyeResh	MCF; Professor Hisao Ishigaki	MCF	August 31, 2016	Unreleased	Unreleased	Unreleased	
F1 2011	Codemasters Birmingham	Codemasters	December 22, 2011	November 25, 2011	December 1, 2011	November 24, 2011	
FabStyle	Koei Tecmo Games	Koei Tecmo Games	November 24, 2011	Unreleased	Unreleased	Unreleased	
Face Racers: Photo Finish	Renegade Kid	Majesco	Unreleased	December 6, 2011	Unreleased	Unreleased	
Face Raiders	HAL Laboratory	Nintendo	February 26, 2011	March 27, 2011	March 31, 2011	March 25, 2011	
Fairune	Skipmore	JP: Flyhigh Works; WW: Circle Entertainment	October 8, 2014	December 18, 2014	Unreleased	December 11, 2014	
Fairune 2	Skipmore	JP: Flyhigh Works; WW: Circle Entertainment	July 13, 2016	October 20, 2016	Unreleased	October 27, 2016	
Family Bowling 3D	Arc System Works	Arc System Works	September 14, 2011	October 3, 2013	Unreleased	November 12, 2015	
Family Fishing	Arc System Works	Aksys Games	Unreleased	November 19, 2015	Unreleased	January 28, 2016	
Family Kart 3D	Arc System Works	Arc System Works	April 11, 2012	August 1, 2013	Unreleased	July 31, 2014	
Family Table Tennis 3D	Arc System Works	Aksys Games	July 18, 2012	September 26, 2013	Unreleased	Unreleased	
Family Tennis 3D	Arc System Works	Arc System Works	September 28, 2011	July 5, 2012	Unreleased	February 28, 2013	
Fantasy Life	Level-5	JP: Level-5; WW: Nintendo	December 27, 2012	October 24, 2014	September 27, 2014	September 26, 2014	
Fantasy Life Link!	Level-5	Level-5	July 25, 2013	Unreleased	Unreleased	Unreleased	
Fantasy Pirates	EnjoyUp Games	JP: Cosen; WW: EnjoyUp Games	April 20, 2016	July 23, 2015	Unreleased	July 2, 2015	
Farming Simulator 14	Firebrand Games	Focus Home Interactive	August 7, 2014	June 24, 2014	Unreleased	June 5, 2014	
Farming Simulator 18	Giants Software	JP: Intergrow; WW: Focus Home Interactive	July 20, 2017	June 6, 2017	June 9, 2017	June 6, 2017	
Farming Simulator 3D	Giants Software	Focus Home Interactive	April 4, 2013	June 23, 2013	Unreleased	March 30, 2012	
Farmscapes	Playrix	Denda Games	Unreleased	Unreleased	Unreleased	March 14, 2013	
Fast & Furious: Showdown	Firebrand Games	Activision	Unreleased	May 21, 2013	May 22, 2013	May 24, 2013	
Fat Dragons	Nostatic Software	Nostatic Software	Unreleased	February 22, 2018	Unreleased	February 15, 2018	
Fatal Fracture	Igor Gafton	VG && IG	Unreleased	October 10, 2019	Unreleased	November 21, 2019	
Fate/kaleid liner Prisma Illya	Kadokawa Games	Kadokawa Games	July 31, 2014	Unreleased	Unreleased	Unreleased	
FIFA 14: Legacy Edition	EA Canada	Electronic Arts	Unreleased	September 24, 2013	September 26, 2013	September 27, 2013	
FIFA 15: Legacy Edition	EA Canada	Electronic Arts	Unreleased	September 23, 2014	September 25, 2014	September 26, 2014	
FIFA Soccer 12	EA Canada	Electronic Arts	Unreleased	September 27, 2011	September 29, 2011	September 30, 2011	
FIFA Soccer 13	EA Canada	Electronic Arts	Unreleased	September 25, 2012	September 27, 2012	September 28, 2012	
Fifteen	RCMADIAX	RCMADIAX	Unreleased	April 13, 2017	March 30, 2017	March 30, 2017	
Final Fantasy	Square Enix	Square Enix	January 21, 2015	Unreleased	Unreleased	Unreleased	
Final Fantasy Explorers	Square Enix; Racjin	Square Enix	December 18, 2014	January 26, 2016	January 29, 2016	January 29, 2016	
Finding Nemo: Escape to the Big Blue Special Edition	Disney Interactive Studios	Disney Interactive Studios	Unreleased	September 11, 2012	November 1, 2012	February 14, 2013	
Fire Emblem Awakening	Intelligent Systems; Nintendo SPD	Nintendo	April 19, 2012	February 4, 2013	April 20, 2013	April 19, 2013	
Fire Emblem Echoes: Shadows of Valentia	Intelligent Systems; Nintendo SPD	Nintendo	April 20, 2017	May 19, 2017	May 20, 2017	May 19, 2017	
Fire Emblem Fates: Birthright	Intelligent Systems; Nintendo SPD	Nintendo	June 25, 2015	February 19, 2016	May 21, 2016	May 20, 2016	
Fire Emblem Fates: Conquest	Intelligent Systems; Nintendo SPD	Nintendo	June 25, 2015	February 19, 2016	May 21, 2016	May 20, 2016	
Fire Emblem Fates: Revelation	Intelligent Systems; Nintendo SPD	Nintendo	July 15, 2015	March 10, 2016	May 21, 2016	May 20, 2016	
Fire Emblem Warriors	Omega Force; Team Ninja; Intelligent Systems	Nintendo	September 28, 2017	October 20, 2017	October 20, 2017	October 20, 2017	
Fireman Sam: To the Rescue	Avanquest	Avanquest	Unreleased	Unreleased	Unreleased	November 27, 2015	
Fish Eyes 3D	Marvelous Entertainment	Marvelous Entertainment	June 23, 2011	Unreleased	Unreleased	Unreleased	
Fish On	SIMS Co., Ltd.	ASCII Media Works	June 9, 2011	Unreleased	Unreleased	Unreleased	
Fishdom H2O: Hidden Odyssey	Playrix	Cypronia	Unreleased	July 4, 2013	Unreleased	December 5, 2013	
Flap Flap	Sanuk Games	Bigben Interactive	Unreleased	February 19, 2015	Unreleased	February 19, 2015	
Flying Axe	Crasnencov	Crasnencov	Unreleased	May 20, 2021	Unreleased	April 15, 2021	
Flick Golf 3D	Full Fat	Full Fat	Unreleased	July 30, 2015	Unreleased	July 30, 2015	
Fluidity: Spin Cycle	Curve Studios	Nintendo	December 19, 2012	December 27, 2012	December 13, 2012	December 13, 2012	
Food Wars: The Dish of Friendship and Bonds	FuRyu	FuRyu	December 17, 2015	Unreleased	Unreleased	Unreleased	
Four Bombs	RCMADIAX	RCMADIAX	Unreleased	March 30, 2017	March 16, 2017	March 16, 2017	
Fossil Fighters: Frontier	Red Entertainment; Spike Chunsoft	Nintendo	February 27, 2014	March 20, 2015	May 30, 2015	May 29, 2015	
Fractured Soul	Endgame Studios	JP: CyberStep; WW: Endgame Studios	March 27, 2013	September 13, 2012	January 10, 2013	January 10, 2013	
Fragrant Story	William Kage	Seven Silhouettes Enterprises	Unreleased	April 21, 2022	Unreleased	Unreleased	
Freakyforms Deluxe: Your Creations, Alive!	Asobism	Nintendo	April 10, 2013	November 5, 2012	September 13, 2012	July 28, 2012	
Freakyforms: Your Creations, Alive!	Asobism	Nintendo	September 7, 2011	November 10, 2011	November 10, 2011	November 10, 2011	
Frogger 3D	Alpha Unit	Konami	September 22, 2011	September 20, 2011	Unreleased	November 8, 2011	
Frontier Days: Founding Pioneers	Arc System Works	JP: Arc System Works; WW: Circle Entertainment	December 16, 2015	March 9, 2017	Unreleased	March 16, 2017	
Frozen: Olaf's Quest	1st Playable Productions	JP: Bergsala Lightweight; NA: GameMill Entertainment; EU: Avanquest Software	December 3, 2015	November 12, 2013	January 18, 2014	December 6, 2013	
Frutakia 2	Crazysoft	Crazysoft	Unreleased	September 21, 2017	Unreleased	November 2, 2017	
Fujiko F. Fujio Characters Daishuugou! SF Dotabata Party!	Bandai Namco Games	Bandai Namco Games	November 20, 2014	Unreleased	Unreleased	Unreleased	
Funfair Party Games	Avanquest Software	Joindots	Unreleased	August 22, 2013	Unreleased	August 22, 2013	
Fun! Fun! Minigolf Touch	Shin'en Multimedia	JP: Cyberfront; WW: Shin'en Multimedia	September 19, 2012	March 8, 2012	March 8, 2012	March 8, 2012	
Funky Barn 3D	Tantalus Interactive	Ubisoft	May 24, 2012	April 3, 2012	September 20, 2012	September 21, 2012	
Future Card Buddyfight: Mezase! Buddy Champion!	FuRyu	FuRyu	March 16, 2017	Unreleased	Unreleased	Unreleased	
Future Card Buddyfight: Tanjou! Oretachi no Saikyou Body!	FuRyu	FuRyu	March 15, 2018	Unreleased	Unreleased	Unreleased	
Future Card Buddyfight: Yuujou no Bakunetsu Fight!	FuRyu	FuRyu	April 16, 2015	Unreleased	Unreleased	Unreleased	
Futuridium EP Deluxe	MixedBag	MixedBag; Playism	Unreleased	September 8, 2016	Unreleased	September 15, 2016	
G1 Grand Prix	Genki	Genki	May 24, 2012	Unreleased	Unreleased	Unreleased	
Gabrielle's Ghostly Groove 3D	Funbox Media	JP: Santa Entertainment; WW: Natsume Inc.	July 21, 2011	October 4, 2011	October 4, 2013	March 2, 2012	
Gabrielle's Ghostly Groove Mini	Asgard	Natsume Inc.	Unreleased	June 27, 2013	Unreleased	Unreleased	
Gacha Racing	Genki	Genki	July 2, 2014	Unreleased	Unreleased	Unreleased	
Gaist Crusher	Treasure	Capcom	December 5, 2013	Unreleased	Unreleased	Unreleased	
Gaist Crusher God	Capcom	Capcom	September 4, 2014	Unreleased	Unreleased	Unreleased	
Gakuyuu Unmeikyoudoutai: Friends in the Same RPG	Poisoft	Poisoft	January 20, 2016	Unreleased	Unreleased	Unreleased	
Gal Galaxy Pain	Butterfly	Batafurai	Unreleased	December 27, 2021	Unreleased	April 14, 2022	
Galaxy Blaster	RCMADIAX	JP: Cosen; WW: RCMADIAX	May 10, 2017	December 8, 2016	December 8, 2016	December 8, 2016	
Galaxy Blaster Code Red	RCMADIAX	RCMADIAX	Unreleased	October 19, 2017	November 2, 2017	November 2, 2017	
The Game 15	Culture Brain Excel	Culture Brain Excel	April 26, 2017	Unreleased	Unreleased	Unreleased	
The Game 15 Vol. 2	Culture Brain Excel	Culture Brain Excel	July 5, 2017	Unreleased	Unreleased	Unreleased	
Game Center CX: 3-Choume no Arino	G.Rev	Bandai Namco Games	March 20, 2014	Unreleased	Unreleased	Unreleased	
Games Festival 1	Neopica	Bigben Interactive	Unreleased	Unreleased	Unreleased	October 3, 2013	
Games Festival 2	Neopica	Bigben Interactive	Unreleased	Unreleased	Unreleased	October 18, 2013	
Games for Toddlers 2	Skunk Software	Skunk Software	Unreleased	June 7, 2018	Unreleased	Unreleased	
Gardening Mama 2: Forest Friends	Cooking Mama Limited	JP: Cooking Mama Limited; WW: Majesco	September 26, 2013	April 29, 2014	March 7, 2015	March 6, 2015	
Gardenscapes	Joindots	JP: Arc System Works; WW: Joindots	September 3, 2014	December 13, 2012	Unreleased	June 22, 2012	
Garfield Kart	Most Wanted Entertainment	Anuman Interactive	Unreleased	August 13, 2015	Unreleased	July 10, 2015	
Geki Yaba Runner Deluxe	QubicGames	QubicGames	Unreleased	December 22, 2016	Unreleased	December 22, 2016	
Geki Yaba Runner Habanero	Flyhigh Works	Flyhigh Works	June 7, 2017	Unreleased	Unreleased	Unreleased	
Gekitou Senshi Nagerunder	SilverStar	SilverStar	January 28, 2015	Unreleased	Unreleased	Unreleased	
Gem Smashers	Frame Studios Interactive	Red Wagon Games	Unreleased	November 8, 2011	Unreleased	Unreleased	
Generator Rex: Agent of Providence	Virtuos	Activision	Unreleased	November 1, 2011	Unreleased	Unreleased	
Genkai! Yamadzumi Battle	Starsign	Starsign	February 1, 2017	Unreleased	Unreleased	Unreleased	
Ginsei Igo 3D	Silver Star	Silver Star	November 22, 2011	Unreleased	Unreleased	Unreleased	
Ginsei Shogi 3D	Silver Star	Silver Star	July 27, 2011	Unreleased	Unreleased	Unreleased	
Girls' Fashion Shoot	Alchemist	Rising Star Games	November 3, 2011	November 19, 2013	December 13, 2013	December 12, 2013	
Girls RPG: Cinderelife	Level-5	Level-5	March 8, 2012	Unreleased	Unreleased	Unreleased	
Glory of Generals	Circle Entertainment	Circle Entertainment	Unreleased	July 3, 2014	Unreleased	September 18, 2014	
Glory of Generals The Pacific	Circle Entertainment	Circle Entertainment	Unreleased	May 25, 2015	Unreleased	February 4, 2016	
Go! Go! Kokopolo 3D: Space Recipe for Disaster	Tanukii Studios	JP: Starsign; WW: Circle Entertainment	October 11, 2017	February 23, 2017	Unreleased	March 30, 2017	
Go! Go! Kokopolo: Harmonious Forest Revenge	Tanukii Studios Limited	Tanukii Studios Limited	Unreleased	September 9, 2022	Unreleased	Unreleased	
Go! Princess PreCure Sugar Oukoku to 6-nin no Princess!	Bandai Namco Games	Bandai Namco Games	July 30, 2015	Unreleased	Unreleased	Unreleased	
Gon: Baku Baku Baku Baku Adventure	Inti Creates	Bandai Namco Games	June 14, 2012	Unreleased	Unreleased	Unreleased	
Goosebumps: The Game	WayForward Technologies	NA: GameMill Entertainment; EU: Avanquest Software	Unreleased	October 13, 2015	Unreleased	January 21, 2016	
Gotouchi Tetsudou: Gotouchi Chara to Nihon Zenkoku no Tabi	Grounding Inc.	Bandai Namco Games	November 27, 2014	Unreleased	Unreleased	Unreleased	
Gotta Protectors	Ancient	Ancient	September 10, 2016	August 4, 2016	Unreleased	Unreleased	
Gourmet Dream	Arc System Works	Arc System Works	July 1, 2015	December 22, 2016	Unreleased	January 19, 2017	
Governor of Poker	Teyon	Teyon	April 30, 2014	April 10, 2014	Unreleased	April 10, 2014	
Gravity Falls: Legend of the Gnome Gemulets	Ubisoft Osaka	Ubisoft	Unreleased	October 20, 2015	October 22, 2015	October 23, 2015	
Greco Kara no Chousenjou! Eitango no Shima to Obaketachi Step 1	Media 5	Imagineer	November 6, 2013	Unreleased	Unreleased	Unreleased	
Greco Kara no Chousenjou! Eitango no Shima to Obaketachi Step 2	Media 5	Imagineer	November 6, 2013	Unreleased	Unreleased	Unreleased	
Greco Kara no Chousenjou! Eitango no Shima to Obaketachi Step 3	Media 5	Media 5	November 20, 2013	Unreleased	Unreleased	Unreleased	
Greco Kara no Chousenjou! Eitango no Shima to Obaketachi Step 4	Media 5	Media 5	November 20, 2013	Unreleased	Unreleased	Unreleased	
Greco Kara no Chousenjou! Kanji no Yakata to Obake-Tachi: Shougaku 1 Nensei	Media 5	Media 5	July 3, 2013	Unreleased	Unreleased	Unreleased	
Greco Kara no Chousenjou! Kanji no Yakata to Obake-Tachi: Shougaku 2 Nensei	Media 5	Media 5	July 3, 2013	Unreleased	Unreleased	Unreleased	
Greco Kara no Chousenjou! Kanji no Yakata to Obake-Tachi: Shougaku 3 Nensei	Media 5	Media 5	July 3, 2013	Unreleased	Unreleased	Unreleased	
Greco Kara no Chousenjou! Kanji no Yakata to Obake-Tachi: Shougaku 4 Nensei	Media 5	Media 5	July 3, 2013	Unreleased	Unreleased	Unreleased	
Greco Kara no Chousenjou! Kanji no Yakata to Obake-Tachi: Shougaku 5 Nensei	Media 5	Media 5	July 3, 2013	Unreleased	Unreleased	Unreleased	
Greco Kara no Chousenjou! Kanji no Yakata to Obake-Tachi: Shougaku 6 Nensei	Media 5	Media 5	July 3, 2013	Unreleased	Unreleased	Unreleased	
Greco Kara no Chousenjou! Keisan no Shiro to Obake-Tachi: Hikizan	Media 5	Media 5	August 21, 2013	Unreleased	Unreleased	Unreleased	
Greco Kara no Chousenjou! Keisan no Shiro to Obake-Tachi: Kakezan	Media 5	Media 5	August 21, 2013	Unreleased	Unreleased	Unreleased	
Greco Kara no Chousenjou! Keisan no Shiro to Obake-Tachi: Tashizan	Media 5	Media 5	August 21, 2013	Unreleased	Unreleased	Unreleased	
Greco Kara no Chousenjou! Keisan no Shiro to Obake-Tachi: Warizan	Media 5	Media 5	August 21, 2013	Unreleased	Unreleased	Unreleased	
Green Lantern: Rise of the Manhunters	Griptonite Games	Warner Bros. Interactive Entertainment	Unreleased	June 7, 2011	June 29, 2011	June 10, 2011	
Grinsia	Nicalis	Nicalis	August 20, 2014	May 8, 2014	Unreleased	Unreleased	
Groove Heaven	Fun Unit	JP: Fun Unit; WW: Teyon	December 19, 2012	May 23, 2013	Unreleased	May 23, 2013	
Gudetama: Hanjuku de Tanomuwa	Rocket Company	Rocket Company	December 3, 2015	Unreleased	Unreleased	Unreleased	
Gudetama: Okawari Ikagassuka	Imagineer	Imagineer	December 8, 2016	Unreleased	Unreleased	Unreleased	
Guide the Ghost	RCMADIAX	RCMADIAX	Unreleased	September 21, 2017	September 21, 2017	September 21, 2017	
Gummy Bears Magical Medallion	Clockwork Games	Enjoy Gaming	Unreleased	May 2, 2013	Unreleased	October 24, 2013	
Gummy Bears Mini Golf	Clockwork Games	Enjoy Gaming	Unreleased	May 30, 2013	Unreleased	October 24, 2013	
Gu-nyan	Cosen	Cosen	June 17, 2015	Unreleased	Unreleased	Unreleased	
Gundam Try Age SP	Bandai Namco Games	Bandai Namco Games	July 17, 2014	Unreleased	Unreleased	Unreleased	
Gundam: The 3D Battle	Bandai Visual	Bandai Namco Games	March 26, 2011	Unreleased	Unreleased	Unreleased	
Gunma no Yabou for Nintendo 3DS	PUMO	PUMO	June 25, 2014	Unreleased	Unreleased	Unreleased	
Gunman Clive	Hörberg Productions	Hörberg Productions	May 22, 2013	January 3, 2013	December 20, 2012	December 20, 2012	
Gunman Clive 2	Hörberg Productions	Hörberg Productions	March 4, 2015	January 29, 2015	January 29, 2015	January 29, 2015	
Gunslugs	Engine Software; Orangepixel	Engine Software	Unreleased	June 16, 2016	Unreleased	June 16, 2016	
Gunslugs 2	Engine Software; Orangepixel	Engine Software	Unreleased	October 22, 2015	Unreleased	October 22, 2015	
Guruguru Tamagotchi!	Bandai Namco Games	Bandai Namco Games	April 24, 2014	Unreleased	Unreleased	Unreleased	
Gurumin 3D: A Monstrous Adventure	Nihon Falcom Corporation	Mastiff	November 30, 2016	October 13, 2016	Unreleased	October 27, 2016	
Gurutan: Chuugaku Eitango	Media 5	Media 5	November 5, 2014	Unreleased	Unreleased	Unreleased	
Gurutan: Koukou Eitango	Media 5	Media 5	November 5, 2014	Unreleased	Unreleased	Unreleased	
Gurutan: Otona no Eitango	Media 5	Media 5	November 5, 2014	Unreleased	Unreleased	Unreleased	
Haikyu!! Cross Team Match!	Bandai Namco Games	Bandai Namco Games	March 3, 2016	Unreleased	Unreleased	Unreleased	
Haikyu!! Tsunage! Itadaki no Keshiki!!	Bandai Namco Games	Bandai Namco Games	September 25, 2014	Unreleased	Unreleased	Unreleased	
Hakuōki: Memories of the Shinsengumi	Idea Factory	Aksys Games	November 24, 2011	September 24, 2013	Unreleased	November 8, 2013	
Halloween Night Archery	Petite Games	Petite Games	Unreleased	October 26, 2017	Unreleased	October 26, 2017	
Halloween: Trick or Treat 2	Virtual Playground	Microvalue	Unreleased	October 3, 2013	Unreleased	October 31, 2013	
Hamatora: Look At Smoking World	FuRyu	FuRyu	July 17, 2014	Unreleased	Unreleased	Unreleased	
Happiness Charge PreCure! Kawa-Run * Collection	Bandai Namco Games	Bandai Namco Games	July 31, 2014	Unreleased	Unreleased	Unreleased	
The Hand of Panda	Ninja Playground	RedZone Studios	Unreleased	March 3, 2016	Unreleased	Unreleased	
Happy Circus	Moving Player	Moving Player	Unreleased	October 3, 2013	Unreleased	September 26, 2013	
Happy Feet Two	WayForward Technologies	Warner Bros. Interactive Entertainment	Unreleased	November 8, 2011	December 8, 2011	November 11, 2011	
HarmoKnight	Game Freak	Nintendo	September 5, 2012	March 28, 2013	March 28, 2013	March 28, 2013	
Harold Reborn	Lukewasthefish	Luke Vincent	Unreleased	May 13, 2021	Unreleased	Unreleased	
Harold's Walk	Lukewasthefish	Luke Vincent	Unreleased	December 28, 2020	Unreleased	October 28, 2021	
Harvest Moon: A New Beginning	Marvelous AQL	JP: Marvelous AQL; NA: Natsume Inc.; EU: Marvelous AQL Europe	February 23, 2012	October 9, 2012	November 14, 2013	September 20, 2013	
Harvest Moon: The Lost Valley	Tabot	NA: Natsume Inc.; EU: Rising Star Games	Unreleased	November 4, 2014	June 20, 2013	June 19, 2015	
Harvest Moon: Skytree Village	Tabot	NA: Natsume Inc.; EU: Rising Star Games	Unreleased	November 8, 2016	May 30, 2017	June 2, 2017	
Harvest Moon: The Tale of Two Towns	Marvelous Entertainment	JP: Marvelous Entertainment; NA: Natsume Inc.; EU: Rising Star Games	Unreleased	November 1, 2011	July 5, 2012	July 29, 2012	
Harvest Moon: The Tale of Two Towns+	Marvelous	Marvelous	December 14, 2017	Unreleased	Unreleased	Unreleased	
Hatsune Miku and Future Stars: Project Mirai	Sega	Sega	March 8, 2012	Unreleased	Unreleased	Unreleased	
Hatsune Miku: Project Mirai 2	Sega	Sega	October 3, 2013	September 8, 2015	September 10, 2015	September 11, 2015	
Hayate no Usagi Maru: Megumi no Tama to Fū Ma no Shirushi	FK Digital	Arc System Works	October 10, 2012	Unreleased	Unreleased	Unreleased	
Hazumi	EyeCancer	Gamelion Studios	January 14, 2015	August 27, 2015	Unreleased	January 22, 2015	
Heart Beaten	Springloaded	Springloaded	Unreleased	April 30, 2015	Unreleased	April 16, 2015	
Heavy Fire: Black Arms 3D	Teyon	Teyon	Unreleased	August 15, 2013	Unreleased	August 15, 2013	
Heavy Fire: Special Operations 3D	Teyon	Teyon	Unreleased	September 13, 2012	Unreleased	October 25, 2012	
Heavy Fire: The Chosen Few	Teyon	Mastiff	June 14, 2012	December 19, 2011	Unreleased	July 19, 2013	
Hello Kitty & Friends: Rock n' World Tour	Bergsala Lightweight	EU: Rising Star Games; WW: Bergsala Lightweight	July 16, 2015	Unreleased	November 26, 2015	November 13, 2015	
Hello Kitty & Sanrio Friends 3D Racing	Majesco	Majesco	March 23, 2016	November 11, 2014	November 26, 2014	February 27, 2015	
Hello Kitty Happy Happy Family	Compile Heart	Bigben Interactive	Unreleased	Unreleased	Unreleased	September 26, 2014	
Hello Kitty Picnic with Sanrio & Friends	Chaotic Moon Studios	Majesco	Unreleased	October 30, 2012	Unreleased	April 26, 2013	
Hello Kitty to Issho! Block Crash Z	Dorart	Dorart	October 11, 2012	Unreleased	Unreleased	Unreleased	
Hello Kitty's Magic Apron	Examu	Bergsala Lightweight	December 12, 2013	January 28, 2016	November 26, 2015	November 6, 2015	
Henri	Hit-Point Co., Ltd.	Hit-Point Co., Ltd.	January 6, 2016	Unreleased	Unreleased	Unreleased	
Hero Bank	Sega	Sega	March 20, 2014	Unreleased	Unreleased	Unreleased	
Hero Bank 2	Sega	Sega	November 27, 2014	Unreleased	Unreleased	Unreleased	
Heroes of Ruin	n-Space	Square Enix	Unreleased	July 17, 2012	June 21, 2012	June 15, 2012	
Hey! Pikmin	Arzest	Nintendo	July 13, 2017	July 28, 2017	July 29, 2017	July 28, 2017	
Heyawake by Nikoli	Nikoli	Hamster Corporation	September 14, 2011	September 6, 2012	Unreleased	Unreleased	
HeyBot! HeyboHeybo! HeyBoTournament!	Bandai Namco Games	Bandai Namco Games	September 14, 2016	Unreleased	Unreleased	Unreleased	
The Hidden	1st Playable Productions	Majesco	Unreleased	November 3, 2011	Unreleased	Unreleased	
Hidden Expedition: Titanic	Big Fish Games	Big Fish Games	Unreleased	June 26, 2014	May 8, 2014	November 26, 2013	
Hidden Haunts: Gothic Masquerade	Teyon	Selectsoft	Unreleased	August 14, 2014	Unreleased	Unreleased	
Hideaways: Foggy Valley	Teyon	Selectsoft	Unreleased	September 12, 2014	Unreleased	Unreleased	
Hiding Out	Green Lightning	Green Lightning	Unreleased	November 6, 2017	Unreleased	November 6, 2017	
Higanbana no Saku Yoru ni	FuRyu	FuRyu	July 27, 2016	Unreleased	Unreleased	Unreleased	
High School DxD	Kadokawa Games	Kadokawa Games	December 19, 2013	Unreleased	Unreleased	Unreleased	
Hime Girl Paradise: Mechikawa! Agemori Sensation!	Nippon Columbia	Nippon Columbia	March 22, 2016	Unreleased	Unreleased	Unreleased	
Hippari~Nya!	Tom Create	Tom Create	February 18, 2015	Unreleased	Unreleased	Unreleased	
Hit Ninja	Petite Games	Petite Games	Unreleased	December 22, 2016	Unreleased	February 9, 2017	
Hitori by Nikoli	Nikoli	Hamster Corporation	October 26, 2011	September 27, 2012	Unreleased	Unreleased	
Hiyoko Mamire	Unity Games Japan	Unity Games Japan	July 20, 2016	Unreleased	Unreleased	Unreleased	
Hollywood Fame: Hidden Object Adventure	Most Wanted Entertainment	Bigben Interactive	Unreleased	March 5, 2015	Unreleased	February 28, 2014	
Hometown Story	ToyBox	EU: Rising Star Games; WW: Natsume Inc.	December 12, 2013	October 31, 2013	July 24, 2014	May 2, 2014	
Hoppechan Minna de Odekake! Wakuwaku Hoppe Land!!	Nippon Columbia	Nippon Columbia	July 17, 2014	Unreleased	Unreleased	Unreleased	
Hoppechan: Punitto Shibotte Daibouken!	Nippon Columbia	Nippon Columbia	July 23, 2015	Unreleased	Unreleased	Unreleased	
Hoppechan: Tsukutte! Asonde! Punipuni Town!!	Nippon Columbia	Nippon Columbia	July 25, 2013	Unreleased	Unreleased	Unreleased	
Horrid Henry: The Good, the Bad and the Bugly	Asylum Entertainment	Asylum Entertainment	Unreleased	Unreleased	Unreleased	November 25, 2011	
Horror Stories	RandomSpin	RandomSpin	Unreleased	March 21, 2019	Unreleased	March 21, 2019	
Horse Life 4	Ravenscourt	NA: Independent Arts Software; EU: Koch Media	Unreleased	November 12, 2015	Unreleased	November 13, 2015	
Horse Vet 3D	Independent Arts	Treva Entertainment	Unreleased	September 18, 2014	Unreleased	November 27, 2014	
Horses 3D	Neko Entertainment	Ubisoft	Unreleased	March 27, 2012	Unreleased	Unreleased	
Horseshoe Crab Rescue!	Kevin Foley	Kevin Foley	Unreleased	November 16, 2021	Unreleased	Unreleased	
Hot Wheels: World's Best Driver	Firebrand Games	Warner Bros. Interactive Entertainment; Mattel Games	Unreleased	September 17, 2013	October 9, 2013	September 20, 2013	
Hotel Transylvania	WayForward Technologies	GameMill Entertainment	Unreleased	September 25, 2012	Unreleased	November 9, 2012	
The House in Fata Morgana	FuRyu	FuRyu	July 27, 2016	Unreleased	Unreleased	Unreleased	
How to Train Your Dragon 2	Torus Games	Little Orbit	Unreleased	June 10, 2014	June 12, 2014	June 13, 2014	
Hungry Burger	Arc System Works	Arc System Works	September 5, 2012	Unreleased	Unreleased	Unreleased	
Hunting and Camping: in a singularity	Ronie Salgado	Ronie Salgado	Unreleased	August 25, 2022	Unreleased	Unreleased	
Hyperlight EX	CatfishBlues Games	CatfishBlues Games	Unreleased	December 1, 2016	Unreleased	December 1, 2016	
Hyper Paddle Block Rusher	Silver Star	Silver Star	August 22, 2012	Unreleased	Unreleased	Unreleased	
Hyrule Warriors Legends	Koei Tecmo Games	Nintendo	January 21, 2016	March 25, 2016	March 24, 2016	March 24, 2016	
I am an Air Traffic controller Airport Hero Hawaii	Sonic Powered	Sonic Powered	August 23, 2012	March 27, 2014	Unreleased	June 8, 2017	
I am an Air Traffic controller Airport Hero Narita	Sonic Powered	Sonic Powered	December 25, 2014	July 16, 2015	Unreleased	May 25, 2017	
I am an Air Traffic controller Airport Hero Osaka-Kix	Sonic Powered	Sonic Powered	September 4, 2014	June 15, 2017	Unreleased	July 6, 2017	
I Love my Cats	Neopica	Bigben Interactive	Unreleased	July 23, 2015	Unreleased	July 23, 2015	
I Love my Dogs	Neopica	Bigben Interactive	Unreleased	July 16, 2015	Unreleased	July 16, 2015	
I Love my Horse	Neopica	Bigben Interactive	Unreleased	December 18, 2014	Unreleased	November 6, 2014	
I Love my Little Boy	Neopica	Bigben Interactive	Unreleased	December 11, 2014	Unreleased	Unreleased	
I Love my Little Girl	Neopica	Bigben Interactive	Unreleased	December 11, 2014	Unreleased	Unreleased	
I Love my Pets	Neopica	Bigben Interactive	Unreleased	Unreleased	Unreleased	July 25, 2013	
I Love my Pony	Neopica	Bigben Interactive	Unreleased	November 19, 2015	Unreleased	November 20, 2015	
I've Got to Run: Complete Edition	4 Corner Games	4 Corner Games	Unreleased	November 13, 2014	Unreleased	Unreleased	
Ice Age: Continental Drift – Arctic Games	Behaviour Interactive	Activision	Unreleased	July 10, 2012	Unreleased	July 10, 2012	
Ice Station Z	Wobbly Tooth	Wobbly Tooth	April 5, 2017	November 3, 2016	Unreleased	November 3, 2016	
I.F.O	T&E Soft	Turtle Cream	Unreleased	June 28, 2018	Unreleased	June 28, 2018	
Idol Time PriPara: Yume All-Star Live!	Takara Tomy	Takara Tomy	October 26, 2017	Unreleased	Unreleased	Unreleased	
Ijin Bakutou!! Udeziman	Takara Tomy	Takara Tomy	February 18, 2015	Unreleased	Unreleased	Unreleased	
Ikachan	Daisuke Amaya	Nicalis	November 30, 2016	January 31, 2013	Unreleased	Unreleased	
Illvelo Dillinjah	Klon	Klon	October 3, 2018	Unreleased	Unreleased	Unreleased	
Imagine: Babyz	Ubisoft Milan	Ubisoft	Unreleased	October 9, 2012	October 25, 2012	October 26, 2012	
Imagine: Champion Rider 3D	Ubisoft Milan	Ubisoft	Unreleased	Unreleased	February 14, 2013	February 14, 2013	
Imagine: Fashion Designer	Ubisoft Milan	Ubisoft	April 19, 2012	October 11, 2011	November 24, 2011	November 25, 2011	
Imagine: Fashion Life	Ubisoft Milan	Ubisoft	Unreleased	October 23, 2012	October 26, 2012	October 26, 2012	
Imomushi Wars	Starsign	Starsign	September 12, 2018	Unreleased	Unreleased	Unreleased	
Inazuma Eleven	Level-5	Nintendo	July 20, 2018	February 13, 2014	Unreleased	Unreleased	
Inazuma Eleven 1, 2, 3!! The Legend of Mamoru Endou	Level-5	Nintendo	December 27, 2012	Unreleased	Unreleased	Unreleased	
Inazuma Eleven 3: Bomb Blast	Level-5	Nintendo	Unreleased	Unreleased	Unreleased	September 27, 2013	
Inazuma Eleven 3: Lightning Bolt	Level-5	Nintendo	Unreleased	Unreleased	Unreleased	September 27, 2013	
Inazuma Eleven 3: Team Ogre Attacks!	Level-5	Nintendo	Unreleased	Unreleased	Unreleased	February 14, 2014	
Inazuma Eleven Everyday	Level-5	Nintendo	December 20, 2012	Unreleased	Unreleased	Unreleased	
Inazuma Eleven GO Chrono Stones: Thunderflash	Level-5	JP: Level-5; WW: Nintendo	December 13, 2012	Unreleased	Unreleased	March 27, 2015	
Inazuma Eleven GO Chrono Stones: Wildfire	Level-5	JP: Level-5; WW: Nintendo	December 13, 2012	Unreleased	Unreleased	March 27, 2015	
Inazuma Eleven GO 3: Galaxy – Big Bang	Level-5	JP: Level-5; WW: Nintendo	December 5, 2013	Unreleased	Unreleased	Unreleased	
Inazuma Eleven GO 3: Galaxy – Supernova	Level-5	JP: Level-5; WW: Nintendo	December 5, 2013	Unreleased	Unreleased	Unreleased	
Inazuma Eleven GO: Light	Level-5	JP: Level-5; WW: Nintendo	December 15, 2011	Unreleased	July 18, 2015	June 13, 2014	
Inazuma Eleven GO: Shadow	Level-5	JP: Level-5; WW: Nintendo	December 15, 2011	Unreleased	July 18, 2015	June 13, 2014	
Infinite Dunamis	Kemco	Kemco	March 2, 2016	May 26, 2016	Unreleased	May 26, 2016	
Infinite Golf	Petite Games	Petite Games	Unreleased	May 4, 2017	Unreleased	July 20, 2017	
Initial D Perfect Shift Online	Sega	Sega	April 2, 2014	Unreleased	Unreleased	Unreleased	
Insect Planet TD	RandomSpin	RandomSpin	Unreleased	October 25, 2018	Unreleased	November 15, 2018	
Iron Combat: War in the Air; Rinkou no Lantse^{JP}	AMZY	Teyon	March 19, 2015	March 19, 2015	Unreleased	April 16, 2015	
IronFall: Invasion	VD-Dev	VD-Dev	October 28, 2015	February 26, 2015	February 13, 2015	February 13, 2015	
Island Days	0verflow	Stack	July 3, 2014	Unreleased	Unreleased	Unreleased	
Jack And Jane: Jungle Escape	Denvzla Estudio	Denvzla Estudio	Unreleased	June 25, 2020	Unreleased	Unreleased	
Jake Hunter Detective Story: Ghost of the Dusk	Arc System Works	Arc System Works	August 31, 2017	September 28, 2018	Unreleased	September 28, 2018	
James Noir's Hollywood Crimes	Ubisoft Montreal	Ubisoft	Unreleased	November 1, 2011	November 24, 2011	November 25, 2011	
Japanese Rail Sim 3D: 5 Types of Trains	Sonic Powered	Sonic Powered	September 1, 2016	November 22, 2018	Unreleased	November 22, 2018	
Japanese Rail Sim 3D: Journey in Suburbs #1	Sonic Powered	Sonic Powered	Unreleased	June 11, 2015	Unreleased	Unreleased	
Japanese Rail Sim 3D: Journey in Suburbs #1 Vol. 2	Sonic Powered	Sonic Powered	Unreleased	March 24, 2016	Unreleased	Unreleased	
Japanese Rail Sim 3D: Journey in Suburbs #1 Vol. 3	Sonic Powered	Sonic Powered	Unreleased	March 24, 2016	Unreleased	Unreleased	
Japanese Rail Sim 3D: Journey in Suburbs #1 Vol. 4	Sonic Powered	Sonic Powered	Unreleased	March 24, 2016	Unreleased	Unreleased	
Japanese Rail Sim 3D: Journey in Suburbs #2	Sonic Powered	Sonic Powered	August 21, 2014	March 16, 2017	Unreleased	Unreleased	
Japanese Rail Sim 3D: Journey to Kyoto	Sonic Powered	Sonic Powered	October 23, 2014	August 6, 2015	Unreleased	December 24, 2015	
Japanese Rail Sim 3D: Monorail Trip to Okinawa	Sonic Powered	Sonic Powered	August 25, 2016	August 25, 2016	Unreleased	December 22, 2016	
Japanese Rail Sim 3D: Travel of Steam	Sonic Powered	Sonic Powered	Unreleased	December 7, 2017	Unreleased	December 7, 2017	
Jaws: Ultimate Predator	n-Space	Majesco	Unreleased	December 1, 2011	Unreleased	Unreleased	
Jet Dog	Bigben Interactive	Bigben Interactive	Unreleased	March 26, 2015	Unreleased	March 26, 2015	
Jett Rocket II: The Wrath of Taikai	Shin'en Multimedia	Shin'en Multimedia	February 5, 2014	November 13, 2013	Unreleased	November 13, 2013	
Jewel Link Double Pack: Safari Quest and Atlantic Quest	Avanquest Software	Avanquest Software	Unreleased	Unreleased	Unreleased	April 10, 2015	
Jewel Master Atlantis 3D	Cerasus Media	Cerasus Media	September 19, 2013	Unreleased	Unreleased	March 14, 2013	
Jewel Master: Cradle of Egypt 2 3D	Cerasus Media	Rising Star Games	Unreleased	October 17, 2013	September 26, 2013	October 12, 2012	
Jewel Master: Cradle of Rome 2 3D	Cerasus Media	Rising Star Games	Unreleased	June 26, 2012	April 26, 2012	April 27, 2012	
Jewel Match 3	Suricate Software	Joindots	Unreleased	November 21, 2013	Unreleased	November 21, 2013	
Jewel Quest 4 Heritage	Engine Software	MSL	Unreleased	August 6, 2015	Unreleased	August 15, 2013	
Jewel Quest Mysteries 3: The Seventh Gate	MSL	MSL	Unreleased	Unreleased	Unreleased	February 27, 2014	
Jewel Quest: The Sapphire Dragon	MSL	MSL	Unreleased	January 29, 2015	Unreleased	May 8, 2014	
Jewelpet: Cooking at the Magical Cafe!	FuRyu	FuRyu	November 14, 2013	Unreleased	Unreleased	Unreleased	
Jewelpet: Magical Dance in Style Deco!	FuRyu	FuRyu	November 8, 2012	Unreleased	Unreleased	Unreleased	
Jewelpet: Magical Rhythm Yay!	RCMADIAX	RCMADIAX	November 10, 2011	Unreleased	Unreleased	Unreleased	
Jikkyou Powerful Pro Yakyuu Heroes	Konami	Konami	December 15, 2016	Unreleased	Unreleased	Unreleased	
Johnny Dynamite	TwoFiveSix	NA: Enjoy Gaming; WW: Starsign	May 13, 2015	May 7, 2015	Unreleased	December 15, 2016	
Johnny Hotshot	UFO Interactive Games	UFO Interactive Games	Unreleased	November 8, 2012	Unreleased	November 15, 2012	
Johnny Impossible	UFO Interactive Games	UFO Interactive Games	Unreleased	December 27, 2012	Unreleased	Unreleased	
Johnny Kung Fu	UFO Interactive Games	JP: Cyberfront; WW: UFO Interactive Games	December 12, 2012	July 12, 2012	Unreleased	August 2, 2012	
Johnny's Payday Panic	Office Create	Office Create	May 20, 2015	November 12, 2015	Unreleased	November 19, 2015	
Journey to Kreisia	Kemco	Kemco	June 1, 2016	July 14, 2016	Unreleased	July 14, 2016	
JS Girl: Doki Doki Model Challenge	syn Sophia	Nippon Columbia	April 24, 2014	Unreleased	Unreleased	Unreleased	
Jump Trials Supreme	G-STYLE	G-STYLE	November 27, 2013	December 12, 2013	Unreleased	August 18, 2016	
Jump Yuusha	Nippon Columbia	Nippon Columbia	September 9, 2015	Unreleased	Unreleased	Unreleased	
Junior Classic Games 3D	Maximum Games	Maximum Games	Unreleased	November 27, 2012	January 24, 2013	May 8, 2012	
Justice Chronicles	Kemco	Kemco	October 13, 2016	March 31, 2016	Unreleased	March 31, 2016	
Kaite Oboeru: Dora-Gana	Nintendo	Nintendo	November 12, 2015	Unreleased	Unreleased	Unreleased	
Kaitou Joker: Toki wo Koeru Kaitou to Ushinawareta Houseki	Bandai Namco Games	Bandai Namco Games	June 25, 2015	Unreleased	Unreleased	Unreleased	
Kakuro by Nikoli	Nikoli	Hamster Corporation	August 3, 2011	May 31, 2012	Unreleased	Unreleased	
Kaku-San-Sei Million Arthur	Square Enix	Square Enix	October 22, 2014	Unreleased	Unreleased	Unreleased	
Kamen Rider Atsume	Toei Animation	Toei Animation	January 25, 2017	Unreleased	Unreleased	Unreleased	
Kamen Rider Ghost: Game de Kaigan!!	Bandai Namco Games	Bandai Namco Games	December 2, 2015	Unreleased	Unreleased	Unreleased	
Kamen Rider: Travelers Senki	Bandai Namco Games	Bandai Namco Games	November 28, 2013	Unreleased	Unreleased	Unreleased	
Kami	Circle Entertainment	Circle Entertainment	February 18, 2015	February 5, 2015	Unreleased	May 19, 2016	
Kamiwaza Wanda: Kirakira Ichibangai Kikiippatsu	FuRyu	FuRyu	October 27, 2016	Unreleased	Unreleased	Unreleased	
Kanbutsu Himouto! Umaru-chan Daratto Puzzle	FuRyu	FuRyu	March 15, 2017	Unreleased	Unreleased	Unreleased	
Karous: The Beast of Re:Eden	Klon	Circle Entertainment	February 6, 2019	April 30, 2015	Unreleased	July 2, 2015	
Kawaii Koneko 3D	MTO	MTO	December 13, 2012	Unreleased	Unreleased	Unreleased	
Kawaii Pet to Kurasou! Wan Nyan & Idol Animal	Nippon Columbia	Nippon Columbia	April 5, 2018	Unreleased	Unreleased	Unreleased	
Kawaii Pet to Kurasou! Wan Nyan & Mini Mini Animal	Nippon Columbia	Nippon Columbia	April 6, 2017	Unreleased	Unreleased	Unreleased	
The Keep	Cinemax, s.r.o.	JP: Arc System Works; WW: Cinemax	January 28, 2015	September 10, 2014	Unreleased	September 18, 2014	
Kemonomix Plus	Rocket Studio	Rocket Studio	August 29, 2012	November 6, 2014	Unreleased	Unreleased	
Ken to Mahou to Gakuen Mono. 3D	Acquire	Acquire	July 7, 2011	Unreleased	Unreleased	Unreleased	
Kenka Banchou 6: Soul & Blood	Spike Chunsoft	Spike Chunsoft	January 15, 2015	Unreleased	Unreleased	Unreleased	
Kersploosh!	Poisoft	JP: Poisoft; WW: Nintendo	June 7, 2011	March 7, 2013	February 28, 2013	February 28, 2013	
Ketzal's Corridors	Keys Factory	Nintendo	October 21, 2011	April 12, 2012	April 5, 2012	April 5, 2012	
Kid Icarus: Uprising	Project Sora; Sora Ltd.	Nintendo	March 22, 2012	March 23, 2012	March 29, 2012	March 23, 2012	
Kid Tripp	Four Horses	JP: Rainy Frog; WW: Four Horses	August 30, 2017	July 27, 2017	Unreleased	July 27, 2017	
Killca Drive	A+ Games	A+ Games	June 3, 2015	Unreleased	Unreleased	Unreleased	
Kingdom Hearts 3D: Dream Drop Distance	Square Enix 1st Production Department	Square Enix	March 29, 2012	July 31, 2012	July 26, 2012	July 20, 2012	
Kingdom's Item Shop	Asobox; Pumo	Circle Entertainment	October 22, 2014	August 18, 2016	Unreleased	September 8, 2016	
Kiniro no Corda 3 Full Voice Special	Koei Tecmo Games	Koei Tecmo Games	February 26, 2015	Unreleased	Unreleased	Unreleased	
Kira*Meki Oshare Salon! Watashi no Shigoto wa Biyoushi-San	Koei Tecmo Games	Koei Tecmo Games	May 30, 2013	Unreleased	Unreleased	Unreleased	
Kirby Battle Royale	HAL Laboratory	Nintendo	November 30, 2017	January 19, 2018	November 4, 2017	November 3, 2017	
Kirby Fighters Deluxe	HAL Laboratory	Nintendo	July 23, 2015	August 29, 2014	February 13, 2015	February 13, 2015	
Kirby: Planet Robobot	HAL Laboratory	Nintendo	April 28, 2016	June 10, 2016	June 11, 2016	June 10, 2016	
Kirby: Triple Deluxe	HAL Laboratory	Nintendo	January 11, 2014	May 2, 2014	May 17, 2014	May 16, 2014	
Kirby's Blowout Blast	HAL Laboratory	Nintendo	July 4, 2017	July 6, 2017	July 6, 2017	July 6, 2017	
Kirby's Extra Epic Yarn	Good-Feel	Nintendo	March 7, 2019	March 8, 2019	March 9, 2019	March 8, 2019	
Kobayashi ga Kawai Sugite Tsurai!!	Happinet	Happinet	August 27, 2015	Unreleased	Unreleased	Unreleased	
Kobito Game Taizen	Nippon Columbia	Nippon Columbia	October 6, 2015	Unreleased	Unreleased	Unreleased	
Kobitodzukan: Kobito Kansatsu Set	Nippon Columbia	Nippon Columbia	October 6, 2015	Unreleased	Unreleased	Unreleased	
Kobito Zukan Kobito no Fushigi Jikken Set	Nippon Columbia	Nippon Columbia	December 12, 2013	Unreleased	Unreleased	Unreleased	
Kodomo ni Anshin Shite Ataerareru Game Series: Sekai Meisaku Douwa - Oyako de Yomeru Game Ehon Bouken-Hen	Alchemist	Alchemist	November 28, 2013	Unreleased	Unreleased	Unreleased	
Kodomo ni Anshin Shite Ataerareru Game Series: Sekai Meisaku Douwa - Oyako de Yomeru Game Ehon Princess-Hen	Alchemist	Alchemist	November 28, 2013	Unreleased	Unreleased	Unreleased	
Kokuga	G.rev	G.rev	August 27, 2012	June 27, 2013	Unreleased	July 11, 2013	
Konchuu Monster: Super Battle	Culture Brain	Culture Brain	June 19, 2014	Unreleased	Unreleased	Unreleased	
Koneko no Album -My Little Cat-	MTO	MTO	December 19, 2013	Unreleased	Unreleased	Unreleased	
Koneko no Ie: Kirishimaya to Sanbiki no Koneko	Orange	Orange	October 26, 2016	Unreleased	Unreleased	Unreleased	
Koneko no Ie 2: Himitsu no Hako Kara Tobideta Yume	Orange	Orange	March 1, 2017	Unreleased	Unreleased	Unreleased	
Korokesu	Arc System Works	Arc System Works	May 8, 2013	Unreleased	Unreleased	Unreleased	
Kouenji Joshi Soccer 3: Koisuru Eleven Itsuka wa Heaven	Starfish SD	Starfish SD	June 16, 2016	Unreleased	Unreleased	Unreleased	
Kumamon Bomber: Puzzle de Kumamon Taisou	Rocket Company	Imagineer	March 13, 2014	Unreleased	Unreleased	Unreleased	
Kung Fu Fight	Nostatic Software	Nostatic Software	Unreleased	March 30, 2017	Unreleased	March 16, 2017	
Kung Fu Panda: Showdown of Legendary Legends	Vicious Cycle Software	Little Orbit	Unreleased	December 1, 2015	November 26, 2015	November 27, 2015	
Kung Fu Rabbit	Neko Entertainment	JP: Cosen; WW: Neko Entertainment	October 8, 2014	February 20, 2014	Unreleased	February 20, 2014	
Kung Tutu	Famous Gamous	Famous Gamous	Unreleased	November 12, 2020	Unreleased	Unreleased	
Kunio-kun Nekketsu Complete: Famicom Hen	Arc System Works	Arc System Works	December 8, 2016	Unreleased	Unreleased	Unreleased	
Kuroko no Basuke: Mirai e no Kizuna	Bandai Namco Games	Bandai Namco Games	March 26, 2015	Unreleased	Unreleased	Unreleased	
Kuroko no Basuke: Shouri e no Kiseki	Bandai Namco Games	Bandai Namco Games	February 20, 2014	Unreleased	Unreleased	Unreleased	
Kuroko Style	iNPLAS CO., Ltd.	iNPLAS CO., Ltd.	March 12, 2014	Unreleased	Unreleased	Unreleased	
Kururin Sushi	Arc System Works	Arc System Works	September 12, 2012	Unreleased	Unreleased	Unreleased	
Kutar Apple	Flyhigh Works	Circle Entertainment	August 3, 2016	November 10, 2016	Unreleased	December 15, 2016	
Kutar Burger Factory	Flyhigh Works	Circle Entertainment	August 3, 2016	November 10, 2016	Unreleased	December 15, 2016	
Kutar Concert Staff	Flyhigh Works	Circle Entertainment	August 3, 2016	November 10, 2016	Unreleased	December 15, 2016	
Kutar End Credits	Flyhigh Works	Circle Entertainment	August 3, 2016	November 10, 2016	Unreleased	December 15, 2016	
Kutar Jump Rope	Flyhigh Works	Circle Entertainment	August 3, 2016	November 10, 2016	Unreleased	December 15, 2016	
Kutar Magic Ball	Flyhigh Works	Circle Entertainment	August 3, 2016	November 10, 2016	Unreleased	December 15, 2016	
Kutar Powder Factory	Flyhigh Works	Circle Entertainment	August 3, 2016	November 10, 2016	Unreleased	December 15, 2016	
Kutar Quiz	Flyhigh Works	Circle Entertainment	August 3, 2016	November 10, 2016	Unreleased	December 15, 2016	
Kutar Ski Lift	Flyhigh Works	Circle Entertainment	August 3, 2016	November 10, 2016	Unreleased	December 15, 2016	
Kutar Tube Rider	Flyhigh Works	Circle Entertainment	August 3, 2016	November 10, 2016	Unreleased	December 15, 2016	
LBX: Little Battlers eXperience	Level-5	Nintendo	July 5, 2012	August 21, 2015	September 5, 2015	September 4, 2015	
Layton's Mystery Journey: Katrielle and the Millionaires' Conspiracy	Level-5	JP: Level-5; WW: Nintendo	July 20, 2017	October 6, 2017	October 6, 2017	October 6, 2017	
Lalaloopsy: Carnival of Friends	Activision	Activision	Unreleased	September 25, 2012	Unreleased	Unreleased	
Langrisser Re:Incarnation Tensei	Masaya Games	JP: Extreme Games; WW: Aksys Games	July 23, 2015	April 19, 2016	Unreleased	April 19, 2016	
League of Heroes	Gamelion Studios	Gamelion Studios	Unreleased	December 18, 2014	Unreleased	March 5, 2015	
The Legend of Dark Witch	Inside System	Circle Entertainment	August 6, 2014	August 26, 2015	March 18, 2016	March 17, 2016	
The Legend of Dark Witch 2	Inside System; Flyhigh Works	Circle Entertainment	November 4, 2015	December 17, 2015	February 16, 2017	February 11, 2016	
The Legend of Dark Witch 3: Wisdom and Lunacy	Inside System; Flyhigh Works; M2	Circle Entertainment	December 27, 2017	December 21, 2017	Unreleased	December 21, 2017	
Legend of Korra: A New Era Begins	PlatinumGames	Activision	October 28, 2014	October 28, 2014	October 28, 2014	October 28, 2014	
Legend of Kusakari	Nnooo	Nnooo	May 13, 2015	August 25, 2016	August 25, 2016	August 25, 2016	
Legend of Legacy	FuRyu	FuRyu; Atlus USA	January 22, 2015	October 13, 2015	February 12, 2016	February 5, 2016	
The Legend of Zelda: A Link Between Worlds	Nintendo EAD	Nintendo	December 26, 2013	November 22, 2013	November 23, 2013	November 22, 2013	
The Legend of Zelda: Majora's Mask 3D	Nintendo EAD; Grezzo	Nintendo	February 14, 2015	February 13, 2015	February 14, 2015	February 13, 2015	
The Legend of Zelda: Ocarina of Time 3D	Nintendo EAD; Grezzo	Nintendo	June 16, 2011	June 19, 2011	June 30, 2011	June 17, 2011	
The Legend of Zelda: Tri Force Heroes	Nintendo EPD; Grezzo	Nintendo	October 22, 2015	October 23, 2015	October 24, 2015	October 23, 2015	
Legends of Oz: Dorothy's Return	Black Lantern Studios	GameMill Entertainment	Unreleased	April 29, 2014	Unreleased	June 6, 2014	
Legna Tactica	Hit Point	Kemco	December 21, 2016	February 2, 2017	Unreleased	February 2, 2017	
Lego Batman 2: DC Super Heroes	TT Fusion	Warner Bros. Interactive Entertainment	Unreleased	June 19, 2012	June 27, 2012	June 22, 2012	
Lego Batman 3: Beyond Gotham	TT Fusion	Warner Bros. Interactive Entertainment	April 2, 2015	November 11, 2014	November 12, 2014	November 14, 2014	
Lego City Undercover: The Chase Begins	TT Fusion	Nintendo	March 5, 2015	April 21, 2013	April 27, 2013	April 26, 2013	
Lego Friends	TT Fusion; Hellbent Games	Warner Bros. Interactive Entertainment	Unreleased	November 12, 2013	November 27, 2013	November 29, 2013	
Lego Harry Potter: Years 5–7	TT Fusion	Warner Bros. Interactive Entertainment	Unreleased	November 11, 2011	November 16, 2011	November 18, 2011	
Lego Jurassic World	TT Fusion	Warner Bros. Interactive Entertainment	June 12, 2015	June 12, 2015	June 12, 2015	June 12, 2015	
Lego Legends of Chima: Laval's Journey	TT Fusion	Warner Bros. Interactive Entertainment	Unreleased	June 25, 2013	June 26, 2013	June 21, 2013	
Lego Marvel Avengers	TT Fusion	Warner Bros. Interactive Entertainment	January 26, 2016	January 26, 2016	January 27, 2016	January 26, 2016	
Lego Marvel Super Heroes: Universe in Peril	TT Fusion	Warner Bros. Interactive Entertainment	January 22, 2015	October 22, 2013	November 13, 2013	November 15, 2013	
The Lego Movie Videogame	TT Fusion	Warner Bros. Interactive Entertainment	November 6, 2014	February 7, 2014	February 14, 2014	February 14, 2014	
Lego Ninjago: Nindroids	Hellbent Games; Traveller's Tales	TT Games; Warner Bros. Interactive Entertainment; The Lego Group	November 22, 2016	July 29, 2014	July 30, 2014	August 1, 2014	
Lego Ninjago: Shadow of Ronin	TT Fusion; Traveller's Tales	The Lego Group; Warner Bros. Interactive Entertainment	March 27, 2015	March 27, 2015	March 27, 2015	March 27, 2015	
Lego Pirates of the Caribbean: The Video Game	TT Fusion	Disney Interactive Studios	Unreleased	May 10, 2011	May 19, 2011	May 13, 2011	
Lego Star Wars III: The Clone Wars	TT Fusion	LucasArts	Unreleased	March 27, 2011	March 31, 2011	March 25, 2011	
Lego Star Wars: The Force Awakens	TT Fusion	Warner Bros. Interactive Entertainment	October 13, 2016	June 28, 2016	June 29, 2016	June 28, 2016	
Lego The Hobbit	TT Fusion	Warner Bros. Interactive Entertainment	Unreleased	April 8, 2014	April 16, 2014	April 11, 2014	
Lego The Lord of the Rings	TT Fusion	Warner Bros. Interactive Entertainment	Unreleased	October 30, 2012	December 5, 2012	November 23, 2012	
Let's Golf! 3D	Gameloft	Gameloft	August 3, 2011	July 28, 2011	July 28, 2011	July 28, 2011	
Let's Ride! Best in Breed 3D	Smackdown Productions	THQ	Unreleased	March 20, 2012	Unreleased	Unreleased	
Let's! Splat! Machigai Sagashi	Rainy Frog	Rainy Frog	November 30, 2016	Unreleased	Unreleased	Unreleased	
Liberation Maiden	Grasshopper Manufacture	Level-5	November 14, 2012	October 25, 2012	Unreleased	October 4, 2012	
Life with Horses 3D	Independent Arts	Treva Entertainment	Unreleased	December 12, 2013	Unreleased	March 6, 2014	
Lifespeed	Wee Man Studios	Wee Man Studios	Unreleased	February 25, 2019	Unreleased	February 2, 2017	
Link-a-Pix Color; Link Picture Link-a-Pix^{JP}	Lightwood Games	Lightwood Games	February 28, 2018	January 18, 2018	Unreleased	January 18, 2018	
Lionel City Builder 3D: Rise of the Rails	Big John Games	JP: Arc System Works; WW: Big John Games	October 5, 2016	January 14, 2015	Unreleased	November 17, 2016	
Little Adventure on the Prairie	Infinite Madaa	Infinite Madaa	Unreleased	October 12, 2017	Unreleased	August 17, 2017	
Little Doll Princess: Oyastsu-Hen	Arc System Works	Arc System Works	December 4, 2013	Unreleased	Unreleased	Unreleased	
Little Doll Princess: Ryouri-Hen	Arc System Works	Arc System Works	September 4, 2013	Unreleased	Unreleased	Unreleased	
Little Sheep	Famous Gamous	Famous Gamous	Unreleased	August 27, 2020	Unreleased	Unreleased	
Lola's ABC Party	BeiZ	BeiZ	Unreleased	March 13, 2014	Unreleased	Unreleased	
Lord of Magna: Maiden Heaven	Marvelous	NA: Xseed Games; WW: Marvelous Inc.	October 2, 2014	June 2, 2015	Unreleased	June 4, 2015	
Lost Heroes	Bandai Namco Games	Bandai Namco Games	September 6, 2012	Unreleased	Unreleased	Unreleased	
Lost Heroes 2	Bandai Namco Games	Bandai Namco Games	February 5, 2015	Unreleased	Unreleased	Unreleased	
Love Hero	Butterfly	Batafurai	Unreleased	February 14, 2019	Unreleased	March 14, 2019	
Lucky Luke & The Daltons	Anuman Interactive	Anuman Interactive	July 30, 2015	Unreleased	Unreleased	Unreleased	
Luigi's Mansion	Grezzo	Nintendo	November 8, 2018	October 12, 2018	October 20, 2018	October 19, 2018	
Luigi's Mansion: Dark Moon	Next Level Games	Nintendo	March 20, 2013	March 24, 2013	March 28, 2013	March 28, 2013	
Luv Me Buddies Wonderland	Oxygene	Oxygene	February 26, 2015	Unreleased	Unreleased	Unreleased	
Luxor	Engine Software	Tulip Games	July 4, 2017	July 6, 2017	Unreleased	July 6, 2017	
Luxor: Quest for the Afterlife	MumboJumbo	MumboJumbo	May 10, 2012	May 10, 2012	Unreleased	December 23, 2012	
Machine Knight	Kemco	Kemco	January 10, 2018	February 15, 2018	Unreleased	February 15, 2018	
Mad Dog McCree	Engine Software	Digital Leisure	Unreleased	June 14, 2012	Unreleased	October 18, 2012	
Madden NFL Football	EA Sports	EA Sports	Unreleased	March 27, 2011	Unreleased	March 25, 2011	
Magi: Aratanaru Sekai	Bandai Namco Games	Bandai Namco Games	February 13, 2014	Unreleased	Unreleased	Unreleased	
Magi: Hajimari no Meikyū	Bandai Namco Games	Bandai Namco Games	February 21, 2013	Unreleased	Unreleased	Unreleased	
The Magic Hammer	Wobbly Tooth	Wobbly Tooth	April 6, 2016	October 15, 2015	Unreleased	December 10, 2015	
Mahjong 3D: Essentials	Engine Software	TREVA Entertainment	Unreleased	September 19, 2013	Unreleased	September 5, 2013	
Mahjong 3D: Warriors of the Emperor	Treva Entertainment	Treva Entertainment	Unreleased	December 27, 2012	Unreleased	November 25, 2011	
Mahjong Cub3d	Sunsoft	JP: Sunsoft; NA: Atlus	March 3, 2011	October 11, 2011	Unreleased	Unreleased	
Mahjong Mysteries: Ancient Athena	Cerasus Media	Cerasus Media	Unreleased	February 28, 2013	Unreleased	January 17, 2013	
MahoCole: Mahou * Idol Collection	Mages.	Mages.	November 20, 2014	Unreleased	Unreleased	Unreleased	
Maido Hanafuda	Arc System Works	Arc System Works	November 14, 2012	Unreleased	Unreleased	Unreleased	
Maido Heibo Shogi	Arc System Works	Arc System Works	April 3, 2013	Unreleased	Unreleased	Unreleased	
Majin Bone: Jikan to Kuukan no Majin	Bandai Namco Games	Bandai Namco Games	October 9, 2012	Unreleased	Unreleased	Unreleased	
Makai Ouji: Devils and Realist - Dairiou no Hihou	Bandai Namco Games	Bandai Namco Games	September 26, 2013	Unreleased	Unreleased	Unreleased	
Mamegoma Happy! Sweets Farm	Racjin	Nippon Columbia	April 26, 2013	Unreleased	Unreleased	Unreleased	
Mamegoma: Yoi Ko Marui Ko Genki na Ko	Racjin	Nippon Columbia	April 26, 2012	Unreleased	Unreleased	Unreleased	
Mameshiba	Nippon Columbia	Nippon Columbia	October 27, 2011	Unreleased	Unreleased	Unreleased	
Manga-ka Debut Monogatari: Suteki na Manga o Egakou	Nippon Columbia	Nippon Columbia	March 16, 2017	Unreleased	Unreleased	Unreleased	
Mansion Percussion	Poisoft	Poisoft	March 6, 2013	Unreleased	Unreleased	Unreleased	
MapleStory: Girl of Destiny	Nexon Corporation	Nexon Corporation	April 24, 2014	Unreleased	Unreleased	Unreleased	
Mario & Luigi: Bowser's Inside Story + Bowser Jr.'s Journey	AlphaDream; Arzest	Nintendo	December 27, 2018	January 11, 2019	January 26, 2019	January 25, 2019	
Mario & Luigi: Dream Team	AlphaDream; Good-Feel	Nintendo	July 18, 2013	August 11, 2013	July 13, 2013	July 12, 2013	
Mario & Luigi: Paper Jam	AlphaDream	Nintendo	December 3, 2015	January 22, 2016	December 10, 2015	December 4, 2015	
Mario & Luigi: Superstar Saga + Bowser's Minions	AlphaDream	Nintendo	October 5, 2017	October 6, 2017	October 7, 2017	October 6, 2017	
Mario & Sonic at the London 2012 Olympic Games	Sega Sports R&D; Racjin	JP: Nintendo; WW: Sega	March 1, 2012	February 14, 2012	February 9, 2012	February 10, 2012	
Mario & Sonic at the Rio 2016 Olympic Games	Sega Sports R&D; Arzest; Spike Chunsoft	Nintendo	February 18, 2016	March 18, 2016	April 9, 2016	April 8, 2016	
Mario and Donkey Kong: Minis on the Move	Nintendo Software Technology	Nintendo	July 24, 2013	May 9, 2013	May 9, 2013	May 9, 2013	
Mario and Donkey Kong: Minis on the Move + Mario vs. Donkey Kong: Minis March Again!	Nintendo Software Technology	Nintendo	Unreleased	Unreleased	Unreleased	January 16, 2015	
Mario Golf: World Tour	Camelot Software Planning	Nintendo	May 1, 2014	May 2, 2014	May 3, 2014	May 2, 2014	
Mario Kart 7	Nintendo EAD; Retro Studios	Nintendo	December 1, 2011	December 4, 2011	December 3, 2011	December 2, 2011	
Mario Party: Island Tour	NDcube	Nintendo	March 20, 2014	November 22, 2013	January 18, 2014	January 17, 2014	
Mario Party: Star Rush	NDcube	Nintendo	October 20, 2016	November 4, 2016	October 8, 2016	October 7, 2016	
Mario Party: The Top 100	NDcube	Nintendo	December 28, 2017	November 10, 2017	December 22, 2017	December 22, 2017	
Mario Sports Superstars	Bandai Namco Studios; Camelot Software Planning	Nintendo	March 30, 2017	March 24, 2017	March 11, 2017	March 10, 2017	
Mario Tennis Open	Camelot Software Planning	Nintendo	May 24, 2012	May 20, 2012	May 24, 2012	May 25, 2012	
Mario vs. Donkey Kong: Tipping Stars	Nintendo Software Technology	Nintendo	March 19, 2015	March 5, 2015	March 20, 2015	March 20, 2015	
Marvel Disk Wars: Avengers - Ultimate Heroes	Bandai Namco Games	Bandai Namco Games	November 13, 2014	Unreleased	Unreleased	Unreleased	
Marvel Pinball 3D	Zen Studios	Zen Studios	Unreleased	June 28, 2012	Unreleased	June 28, 2012	
Marvel Super Hero Squad: The Infinity Gauntlet	Griptonite Games	THQ	Unreleased	October 11, 2011	October 13, 2011	November 18, 2011	
Masyu by Nikoli	Nikoli	Hamster Corporation	September 28, 2011	July 19, 2012	Unreleased	Unreleased	
Maze Breaker	nuGAME	nuGAME	Unreleased	October 10, 2019	Unreleased	October 17, 2019	
Maze Breaker 2	nuGAME	nuGAME	Unreleased	June 25, 2020	Unreleased	February 6, 2020	
Maze Breaker 3	nuGAME	nuGAME	Unreleased	September 3, 2020	Unreleased	October 15, 2020	
Maze Breaker 4	nuGAME	nuGAME	Unreleased	September 24, 2020	Unreleased	Unreleased	
Maze Breaker 5	nuGAME	nuGAME	Unreleased	October 22, 2020	Unreleased	Unreleased	
Maze Breaker 6	nuGAME	nuGAME	Unreleased	November 12, 2020	Unreleased	Unreleased	
Me & My Furry Patients 3D	Independent Arts	TREVA Entertainment	Unreleased	May 29, 2014	Unreleased	April 24, 2014	
Me & My Pets 3D	Independent Arts	TREVA Entertainment	Unreleased	July 10, 2014	Unreleased	August 14, 2014	
Medabots Classics: Kabuto Version	digifloyd	Rocket Company	December 21, 2017	Unreleased	Unreleased	Unreleased	
Medabots Classics: Kuwagata Version	digifloyd	Rocket Company	December 21, 2017	Unreleased	Unreleased	Unreleased	
Medarot 7: Kabuto Version	Delta Arts	Rocket Company	September 13, 2012	Unreleased	Unreleased	Unreleased	
Medarot 7: Kuwagata Version	Delta Arts	Rocket Company	September 13, 2012	Unreleased	Unreleased	Unreleased	
Medarot 8: Kabuto Version	Delta Arts	Rocket Company	August 28, 2014	Unreleased	Unreleased	Unreleased	
Medarot 8: Kuwagata Version	Delta Arts	Rocket Company	August 28, 2014	Unreleased	Unreleased	Unreleased	
Medarot 9 Kabuto Version	Delta Arts	Rocket Company	December 24, 2015	Unreleased	Unreleased	Unreleased	
Medarot 9 Kuwagata Version	Delta Arts	Rocket Company	December 24, 2015	Unreleased	Unreleased	Unreleased	
Medarot Classics: 20th Anniversary Edition	Imagineer	Imagineer	December 21, 2017	Unreleased	Unreleased	Unreleased	
Medarot Dual Kabuto Version	Jupiter Corporation	Rocket Company	November 14, 2013	Unreleased	Unreleased	Unreleased	
Medarot Dual Kuwagata Version	Jupiter Corporation	Rocket Company	November 14, 2013	Unreleased	Unreleased	Unreleased	
Medarot Girls Mission Kabuto Version	Rocket Company	Rocket Company	March 10, 2016	Unreleased	Unreleased	Unreleased	
Medarot Girls Mission Kuwagata Version	Rocket Company	Rocket Company	March 10, 2016	Unreleased	Unreleased	Unreleased	
Mega Man Legacy Collection	Digital Eclipse Software	Capcom	February 26, 2016	February 25, 2016	February 23, 2016	February 23, 2016	
Megami Meguri	Capcom	Capcom	December 8, 2016	Unreleased	Unreleased	Unreleased	
Meiga to Tanosimu Otona no Machigai Sagashi	Arc System Works	Arc System Works	October 8, 2014	Unreleased	Unreleased	Unreleased	
Meitantei Conan: Marionette Symphony	Bandai Namco Games	Bandai Namco Games	April 25, 2013	Unreleased	Unreleased	Unreleased	
Meitantei Conan: Phantom Rhapsody	Bandai Namco Games	Bandai Namco Games	April 17, 2014	Unreleased	Unreleased	Unreleased	
Mercenaries Saga 2: Order of the Silver Eagle	Rideon Games	Circle Entertainment	February 25, 2015	July 2, 2015	December 2, 2016	July 23, 2015	
Mercenaries Saga 3: Gray Wolves of War	Rideon Games	Circle Entertainment	October 5, 2016	December 15, 2016	Unreleased	January 12, 2017	
Metal Gear Solid: Snake Eater 3D	Kojima Productions	Konami	March 8, 2012	February 21, 2012	March 8, 2012	March 8, 2012	
Metal Max 4: Gekkō no Diva	Cattle Call; 24Frame	Kadokawa Games	November 7, 2013	Unreleased	Unreleased	Unreleased	
Metroid: Samus Returns	MercurySteam; Nintendo EPD	Nintendo	September 15, 2017	September 15, 2017	September 16, 2017	September 15, 2017	
Metroid Prime: Federation Force	Next Level Games	Nintendo	August 25, 2016	August 19, 2016	September 3, 2016	September 2, 2016	
Mia's Picnic	Nellyvision	Nellyvision	Unreleased	August 6, 2020	Unreleased	October 15, 2020	
Michael Jackson: The Experience	Ubisoft	Ubisoft	Unreleased	November 8, 2011	Unreleased	November 11, 2011	
Mighty Gunvolt	Inti Creates	Inti Creates	August 20, 2014	August 29, 2014	April 2, 2015	April 2, 2015	
Mighty Gunvolt Burst	Inti Creates	Inti Creates	June 28, 2017	June 29, 2017	Unreleased	June 29, 2017	
Mighty Switch Force!	WayForward Technologies	JP: Intergrow; WW: WayForward Technologies	November 13, 2013	December 22, 2011	December 22, 2011	December 22, 2011	
Mighty Switch Force! 2	WayForward Technologies	WayForward Technologies	October 5, 2016	June 13, 2013	June 27, 2013	June 27, 2013	
Miitopia	Nintendo	Nintendo	December 8, 2016	July 28, 2017	July 29, 2017	July 28, 2017	
Mike the Knight and the Great Gallop	Avanquest Software	Avanquest Software	Unreleased	Unreleased	Unreleased	June 17, 2016	
Miles & Kilo	Four Horses	Four Horses	Unreleased	March 26, 2020	Unreleased	March 26, 2020	
MindFeud	Engine Software	Engine Software	Unreleased	Unreleased	Unreleased	December 4, 2014	
Minecraft	Other Ocean Interactive	JP: Microsoft; WW: Mojang	September 14, 2017	September 13, 2017	September 20, 2018	September 20, 2018	
Mini Golf Resort	Teyon	Teyon	May 10, 2017	December 22, 2016	Unreleased	January 26, 2017	
Mini Mario & Friends: Amiibo Challenge	Nintendo	Nintendo	January 28, 2016	April 28, 2016	April 29, 2016	April 28, 2016	
Mini Sports Collection	Mechanic Arms	JP: Mechanic Arms; WW: Rainy Frog	July 27, 2016	March 9, 2017	Unreleased	March 9, 2017	
Minna de Auto Racing 3D	Intergrow	Intergrow	March 7, 2013	Unreleased	Unreleased	Unreleased	
Minna de Nanpure	Lightwood Games	Starsign	June 21, 2017	Unreleased	Unreleased	Unreleased	
Minna no Ennichi	Bandai Namco Games	Bandai Namco Games	May 24, 2012	Unreleased	Unreleased	Unreleased	
Miracle Tunes! Game de Tune Up! Tabun!	Arc System Works	Arc System Works	November 9, 2017	Unreleased	Unreleased	Unreleased	
Mitsukete! Ojipokkuru+	Bandai Namco Games	Bandai Namco Games	March 2, 2016	Unreleased	Unreleased	Unreleased	
Moco Moco Friends	Racjin	Aksys Games	April 23, 2015	November 17, 2015	Unreleased	January 21, 2016	
Model * Oshare Audition: Dream Girl	Alchemist	Alchemist	November 14, 2013	Unreleased	Unreleased	Unreleased	
Moe Moe Daisensou Gendaiban 3D	SystemSoft Alpha	SystemSoft Alpha	December 15, 2011	Unreleased	Unreleased	Unreleased	
Moero!! Pro Yakyuu 2016	Mebius	Mebius	November 16, 2016	Unreleased	Unreleased	Unreleased	
Moji Puzzle Kotoda Maru	SilverStar	SilverStar	January 29, 2014	Unreleased	Unreleased	Unreleased	
Mom Hid My Game!	Kemco	Kemco	July 12, 2017	December 21, 2017	Unreleased	December 21, 2017	
Momotaro Dentetsu 2017: Tachiagare Nippon!!	Valhalla Game Studios	Nintendo	December 22, 2016	Unreleased	Unreleased	Unreleased	
Monokage Quest	Poisoft	Poisoft	August 26, 2015	Unreleased	Unreleased	Unreleased	
Mononoke Forest	gamedo	gamedo	June 17, 2015	July 20, 2017	Unreleased	May 25, 2017	
Mononoke Tantei: Shida no Ayakashi Jiken Chou	Arc System Works	Arc System Works	March 26, 2014	Unreleased	Unreleased	Unreleased	
Monster 4x4 3D	Ubisoft	Ubisoft	Unreleased	October 9, 2012	June 14, 2012	June 8, 2012	
Monster Combine TD	Collavier Corporation	Collavier Corporation	Unreleased	March 12, 2015	Unreleased	January 15, 2015	
Monster High: 13 Wishes	Game Machine Studios	Little Orbit	Unreleased	October 29, 2013	November 21, 2013	November 22, 2013	
Monster High: New Ghoul in School	Game Machine Studios	Little Orbit	Unreleased	November 17, 2015	November 27, 2015	November 26, 2015	
Monster High: Skultimate Roller Maze	Game Machine Studios	Little Orbit	Unreleased	March 13, 2013	March 13, 2013	March 29, 2013	
Monster Hunter 3 Ultimate	Capcom	Capcom	December 10, 2011	March 19, 2013	March 23, 2013	March 22, 2013	
Monster Hunter 4	Capcom	Capcom	September 14, 2013	Unreleased	Unreleased	Unreleased	
Monster Hunter 4 Ultimate	Capcom	PAL: Nintendo; WW: Capcom	October 11, 2014	February 13, 2015	February 14, 2015	February 13, 2015	
Monster Hunter Diary: Poka Poka Airou Village DX	Capcom	Capcom	September 10, 2015	Unreleased	Unreleased	Unreleased	
Monster Hunter Generations	Capcom	Capcom	November 28, 2015	July 15, 2016	July 16, 2016	July 15, 2016	
Monster Hunter Stories	Capcom; Marvelous	JP: Capcom; WW: Nintendo	October 8, 2016	September 8, 2017	September 9, 2017	September 8, 2017	
Monster Hunter XX	Capcom	Capcom	March 18, 2017	Unreleased	Unreleased	Unreleased	
Monster Shooter	Gamelion	Gamelion	July 3, 2013	November 15, 2012	November 1, 2012	November 1, 2012	
Monster Strike	Mixi	Nintendo	December 17, 2015	Unreleased	Unreleased	Unreleased	
Moonbound	Jouni Mutanen	Jouni Mutanen	Unreleased	December 16, 2021	Unreleased	January 27, 2022	
Moon Chronicles	Renegade Kid	Renegade Kid	Unreleased	May 15, 2014	Unreleased	Unreleased	
Moshi Monsters: Katsuma Unleashed	Black Lantern Studios	Activision	Unreleased	November 5, 2013	October 22, 2013	October 11, 2013	
Moshi Monsters: Moshlings Theme Park	Black Lantern Studios	Activision	Unreleased	October 30, 2012	October 31, 2012	October 26, 2012	
Motto Me de Unou o Kitaeru: Sokudoku Jutsu 3 (Note: Primarily a speed-reading application, though it includes seven mini-games.)	MileStone Inc.	MileStone Inc.	August 25, 2011	Unreleased	Unreleased	Unreleased	
Mountain Peak Battle Mess	RandomSpin	Vadim Gafton	Unreleased	September 19, 2019	Unreleased	October 24, 2019	
Murder on the Titanic	Easy Interactive	Joindots	April 16, 2014	December 6, 2012	Unreleased	June 14, 2012	
Mushi Bugyou	Bandai Namco Games	Bandai Namco Games	September 19, 2013	Unreleased	Unreleased	Unreleased	
Mutant Mudds	Renegade Kid	Renegade Kid	June 24, 2015	January 26, 2012	June 21, 2012	June 21, 2012	
Mutant Mudds: Super Challenge	Renegade Kid	Renegade Kid	Unreleased	March 17, 2016	March 18, 2016	March 17, 2016	
My Baby Pet Hotel 3D	Independent Arts	Treva Entertainment	Unreleased	November 7, 2013	Unreleased	November 29, 2013	
My Exotic Farm	Bigben Interactive	Bigben Interactive	Unreleased	November 28, 2013	Unreleased	November 21, 2013	
My Farm 3D	Bip Media	Bigben Interactive	Unreleased	August 1, 2013	November 18, 2013	July 10, 2013	
My First Songs	Ringzero Game Studio	Ringzero Game Studio	Unreleased	Unreleased	Unreleased	November 27, 2014	
My First Songs 2	Ringzero Game Studio	Ringzero Game Studio	Unreleased	Unreleased	Unreleased	December 11, 2014	
My Hero Academia: Battle for All	Bandai Namco Games	Bandai Namco Entertainment	May 19, 2016	Unreleased	Unreleased	Unreleased	
My Life on a Farm 3D	TREVA Entertainment	TREVA Entertainment	Unreleased	November 27, 2014	Unreleased	Unreleased	
My Little Baby 3D	TREVA Entertainment	TREVA Entertainment	Unreleased	October 17, 2013	Unreleased	November 7, 2013	
My Melody: Negai ga Kanau Fushigi na Hako	Nippon Columbia	Nippon Columbia	December 10, 2015	Unreleased	Unreleased	Unreleased	
My Nintendo Picross: The Legend of Zelda: Twilight Princess	Jupiter Corporation	Nintendo	March 17, 2016	March 31, 2016	March 31, 2016	March 31, 2016	
My Pet Puppy 3D	Starfish SD	505 Games	Unreleased	January 24, 2012	Unreleased	Unreleased	
My Pet School 3D	TREVA Entertainment	TREVA Entertainment	Unreleased	March 26, 2015	Unreleased	Unreleased	
My Pets	Neopica	Neopica	Unreleased	January 7, 2016	Unreleased	Unreleased	
My Riding Stables 3D: Jumping for the Team	Treva Entertainment	Treva Entertainment	Unreleased	May 2, 2013	Unreleased	May 2, 2013	
My Style Studio: Hair Salon	Cypronia	Cypronia	Unreleased	December 12, 2013	Unreleased	October 23, 2014	
My Vet Practice 3D: In the Country	TREVA Entertainment	TREVA Entertainment	Unreleased	October 17, 2013	Unreleased	November 14, 2013	
My Western Horse 3D	TREVA Entertainment	TREVA Entertainment	Unreleased	August 15, 2013	Unreleased	August 29, 2013	
My Zoo Vet Practice 3D	TREVA Entertainment	TREVA Entertainment	Unreleased	June 11, 2015	Unreleased	June 18, 2015	
Myst	Cyan Worlds; Hoplite Research	NA: Maximum Family Games; PAL: Funbox Media	Unreleased	October 26, 2012	October 25, 2012	October 5, 2012	
The Mysterious Cities of Gold: Secret Paths	Neko Entertainment	Ynnis Interactive	June 13, 2014	March 6, 2014	February 27, 2014	February 27, 2014	
Mysterious Stars 3D: A Fairy Tale	Collavier	Collavier Corporation	May 25, 2016	May 18, 2017	Unreleased	June 8, 2017	
Mysterious Stars 3D: Road to Idol	Collavier	Collavier Corporation	September 7, 2016	May 18, 2017	Unreleased	June 1, 2017	
Mystery Case Files: Dire Grove	Big Fish Games	Big Fish Games	Unreleased	April 3, 2014	April 10, 2014	January 24, 2014	
Mystery Case Files: Ravenhearst	Big Fish Games	Big Fish Games	Unreleased	April 3, 2014	May 1, 2014	August 2, 2013	
Mystery Case Files: Return to Ravenhearst	Big Fish Games	Big Fish Games	Unreleased	April 14, 2014	April 10, 2014	April 10, 2014	
Mystery Murders: Jack the Ripper	Virtual Playground	JP: Circle Entertainment; WW: Microvalue	December 25, 2013	April 18, 2013	August 20, 2013	May 10, 2013	
Mystery Murders: The Sleeping Palace	Microvalue	Microvalue	Unreleased	September 26, 2013	Unreleased	November 28, 2013	
Mystery P.I.: Missing Film	G-Mode	G-Mode	June 7, 2011	Unreleased	Unreleased	Unreleased	

== Applications ==
For applications beginning with N–Z, see N–Z.

List of Nintendo 3DS applications
Title	Developer(s)	Publisher(s)	Release date				Ref.
Title	Developer(s)	Publisher(s)	Japan	North America	Australasia	Europe	Ref.
Anime Workshop	Collavier Corporation	Collavier Corporation	Unreleased	June 8, 2017	Unreleased	March 1, 2018	
Art Academy: Lessons for Everyone!	Headstrong Games	Nintendo	September 13, 2012	October 1, 2012	August 23, 2012	July 28, 2012	
Bijin Tokei	Nintendo	Nintendo	March 21, 2012	Unreleased	Unreleased	Unreleased	
Bookstores Everywhere	Librica	Librica	December 12, 2012	Unreleased	Unreleased	Unreleased	
Chao Illust Club	Happinet	Happinet	November 26, 2015	Unreleased	Unreleased	Unreleased	
Chat-A-Lot	WaiS	Teyon	July 24, 2013	November 20, 2014	Unreleased	February 19, 2015	
Chikaku no BanBro P wo Motteiru Hito to Issho ni Gassou Dekiru	Intelligent Systems	Nintendo	December 19, 2013	Unreleased	Unreleased	Unreleased	
Chou 2 Talk	WaiS	WaiS	August 9, 2017	Unreleased	Unreleased	Unreleased	
Colors! 3D	Collecting Smiles	Collecting Smiles	August 21, 2013	April 5, 2012	February 19, 2015	February 19, 2015	
Comic Workshop	Collavier Corporation	Collavier Corporation	January 15, 2014	July 17, 2014	Unreleased	September 11, 2014	
Comic Workshop 2	Collavier Corporation	Collavier Corporation	February 25, 2015	June 18, 2015	Unreleased	June 18, 2015	
Daigassou! Band Brothers P - Shimobe Tool	Intelligent Systems	Nintendo	October 2, 2013	Unreleased	Unreleased	Unreleased	
Disney Art Academy	Headstrong Games	Nintendo	April 7, 2016	May 13, 2016	July 16, 2016	July 15, 2016	
Dokodemo Honya-San	Librica	Librica	December 12, 2012	Unreleased	Unreleased	Unreleased	
Dokopon Choice: Keroro Gunsou Vol.1 1-5 Maki Pack	Librica	Librica	September 10, 2014	Unreleased	Unreleased	Unreleased	
Doll Fashion Atelier	Mebius	Teyon	August 13, 2015	April 7, 2016	Unreleased	August 11, 2016	
Dot Artist	Librica	Librica	April 19, 2017	Unreleased	Unreleased	Unreleased	
ESSE Rakuraku Kakeibo	IE Institute	IE Institute	December 22, 2011	Unreleased	Unreleased	Unreleased	
Flipnote Studio 3D	Librica	Librica	July 24, 2013	February 10, 2015	March 31, 2016	March 31, 2016	
Gakki de Asobo: Tanoshii Douyou(1)	Sonic Powered	Sonic Powered	April 23, 2014	Unreleased	Unreleased	Unreleased	
Gakki de Asobo: Tanoshii Douyou(2)	Sonic Powered	Sonic Powered	June 25, 2014	Unreleased	Unreleased	Unreleased	
Gakki de Asobo: Tanoshii Douyou(3)	Sonic Powered	Sonic Powered	July 9, 2014	Unreleased	Unreleased	Unreleased	
Hana to Ikimono Rittai Zukan	Nintendo	Nintendo	September 29, 2011	Unreleased	Unreleased	Unreleased	
Hitsuji no Shaun 3D: Dai-1-Maki	Nintendo	Nintendo	February 21, 2013	Unreleased	Unreleased	Unreleased	
Hitsuji no Shaun 3D: Dai-2-Maki	Nintendo	Nintendo	February 21, 2013	Unreleased	Unreleased	Unreleased	
Hitsuji no Shaun 3D: Dai-3-Maki	Nintendo	Nintendo	February 21, 2013	Unreleased	Unreleased	Unreleased	
Hitsuji no Shaun 3D: Dai-4-Maki	Nintendo	Nintendo	April 24, 2013	Unreleased	Unreleased	Unreleased	
Hitsuji no Shaun 3D: Dai-5-Maki	Nintendo	Nintendo	June 26, 2013	Unreleased	Unreleased	Unreleased	
Inch Worm Animation 2: Butterfly	Rainy Frog	Rainy Frog	August 2, 2017	Unreleased	Unreleased	Unreleased	
Isshoni Photo Pikmin	Nintendo	Nintendo	December 2, 2013	Unreleased	Unreleased	Unreleased	
Isshoni Photo Super Mario	Nintendo	Nintendo	April 15, 2013	Unreleased	Unreleased	Unreleased	
Itsu no Ma ni Televi	Nintendo	Nintendo	June 21, 2011	Unreleased	Unreleased	Unreleased	
Jukugo: Sokuhiki Jiten	Altron	Altron	June 26, 2014	Unreleased	Unreleased	Unreleased	
Karaoke JOYSOUND	XING	XING	August 5, 2015	Unreleased	Unreleased	Unreleased	
KORG DSN-12	Procyon Studio	DETUNE	June 25, 2014	October 23, 2014	Unreleased	September 25, 2014	
KORG M01D	Procyon Studio	DETUNE	July 10, 2013	November 7, 2013	Unreleased	November 7, 2013	
Kouekizaidan Houjin Nihon Kanji Nouryoku Kentei Kyoukai: Kanken Training	Imagineer	Imagineer	September 25, 2014	Unreleased	Unreleased	Unreleased	
Kouekizaidan Houjin Nihon Kanji Nouryoku Kentei Kyoukai: Kanken Training - 1-Kyuu Jun-1-Kyuu 2-Kyuu	Imagineer	Imagineer	January 14, 2015	Unreleased	Unreleased	Unreleased	
Kouekizaidan Houjin Nihon Kanji Nouryoku Kentei Kyoukai: Kanken Training - 3-Kyuu	Imagineer	Imagineer	January 14, 2015	Unreleased	Unreleased	Unreleased	
Kouekizaidan Houjin Nihon Kanji Nouryoku Kentei Kyoukai: Kanken Training - 4-Kyuu	Imagineer	Imagineer	January 14, 2015	Unreleased	Unreleased	Unreleased	
Kouekizaidan Houjin Nihon Kanji Nouryoku Kentei Kyoukai: Kanken Training - 5-Kyuu	Imagineer	Imagineer	January 14, 2015	Unreleased	Unreleased	Unreleased	
Kouekizaidan Houjin Nihon Kanji Nouryoku Kentei Kyoukai: Kanken Training - 6-Kyuu	Imagineer	Imagineer	January 14, 2015	Unreleased	Unreleased	Unreleased	
Kouekizaidan Houjin Nihon Kanji Nouryoku Kentei Kyoukai: Kanken Training - 7-Kyuu	Imagineer	Imagineer	January 14, 2015	Unreleased	Unreleased	Unreleased	
Kouekizaidan Houjin Nihon Kanji Nouryoku Kentei Kyoukai: Kanken Training - 8-Kyuu	Imagineer	Imagineer	January 14, 2015	Unreleased	Unreleased	Unreleased	
Kouekizaidan Houjin Nihon Kanji Nouryoku Kentei Kyoukai: Kanken Training - 9-Kyuu 10-Kyuu	Imagineer	Imagineer	January 14, 2015	Unreleased	Unreleased	Unreleased	
Kouekizaidan Houjin Nihon Kanji Nouryoku Kentei Kyoukai: Kanken Training - Jun-2-Kyuu	Imagineer	Imagineer	January 14, 2015	Unreleased	Unreleased	Unreleased	
Kouekizaidan Houjin Nihon Kanji Nouryoku Kentei Kyoukai: Kanken Training 2	Imagineer	Imagineer	July 20, 2017	Unreleased	Unreleased	Unreleased	
Lola's Math Train	BeiZ	JP: D3 Publisher; WW: BeiZ	March 19, 2013	March 21, 2013	Unreleased	April 25, 2013	
Love Plus Tools	Konami	Konami	February 13, 2012	Unreleased	Unreleased	Unreleased	
Magical Diary: Secrets Sharing	Collavier Corporation	Collavier Corporation	Unreleased	October 23, 2014	Unreleased	Unreleased	
Mario & Sonic at the London 2012 Olympic Games: Virtual Card Album	Sega	JP: Nintendo; WW: Sega	Unreleased	Unreleased	Unreleased	July 5, 2012	
Maru Gou! 3D Nanami to Issho ni Gakubo! English Joutatsu no Kotsu Riron-Hen	Media-5	Media-5	March 19, 2013	Unreleased	Unreleased	Unreleased	
Maru Gou! Nanami to Issho ni Gakubo! TOEIC Test Taisaku-Hen	Media-5	Media-5	March 19, 2013	Unreleased	Unreleased	Unreleased	
Maru Goukaku! Boki 2-Kyuu Shiwake Drill: Shougyou Boki - Kougyou Boki	Media5	Media5	July 1, 2015	Unreleased	Unreleased	Unreleased	
Maru Goukaku! Boki 3-Kyuu Shiwake Drill	Media5	Media5	December 24, 2014	Unreleased	Unreleased	Unreleased	
Maru Goukaku! Chihoukoumuin Joukyuu Kyouyou Shiken: 2015 Nendo-Han	Media5	Media5	February 19, 2014	Unreleased	Unreleased	Unreleased	
Maru Goukaku! Chihoukoumuin Joukyuu Senmon Shiken: 2015 Nendo-Han	Media5	Media5	February 19, 2014	Unreleased	Unreleased	Unreleased	
Maru Goukaku! FP2-Kyuu Heisei 26-27 Nendo-Han	Media5	Media5	November 26, 2014	Unreleased	Unreleased	Unreleased	
Maru Goukaku! FP3-Kyuu Heisei 26-27 Nendo-Han	Media5	Media5	November 26, 2014	Unreleased	Unreleased	Unreleased	
Maru Goukaku! Gyousei Shoshi Shiken - Heisei 26 Nendohan	Media5	Media5	August 20, 2014	Unreleased	Unreleased	Unreleased	
Maru Goukaku! Gyouseishoshi Shiken - Heisei 28 Nendohan	Media5	Media5	March 2, 2016	Unreleased	Unreleased	Unreleased	
Maru Goukaku! Gyouseishoshi Shiken - Heisei 29 Nendohan	Media5	Media5	September 13, 2017	Unreleased	Unreleased	Unreleased	
Maru Goukaku! Hisho Kentei	Media5	Media5	August 7, 2013	Unreleased	Unreleased	Unreleased	
Maru Goukaku! Iryou Jimu - Shinryouhoushuu Seikyuu Jimu Nouryoku Nintei Shiken (Ika)	Media5	Media5	March 25, 2015	Unreleased	Unreleased	Unreleased	
Maru Goukaku! IT Passport Shiken Heisei 26 Nendo-ban	Media5	Media5	April 2, 2014	Unreleased	Unreleased	Unreleased	
Maru Goukaku! IT Passport Shiken Heisei 27 Nendo-ban	Media5	Media5	September 30, 2015	Unreleased	Unreleased	Unreleased	
Maru Goukaku! Kaigofukushishi Shiken - Heisei 26 Nendohan	Media5	Media5	July 23, 2014	Unreleased	Unreleased	Unreleased	
Maru Goukaku! Kaigofukushishi Shiken - Heisei 27 Nendohan	Media5	Media5	August 19, 2015	Unreleased	Unreleased	Unreleased	
Maru Goukaku! Kaigofukushishi Shiken - Heisei 28 Nendohan	Media5	Media5	November 2, 2016	Unreleased	Unreleased	Unreleased	
Maru Goukaku! Kaigofukushishi Shiken - Heisei 29 Nendohan	Media5	Media5	July 12, 2017	Unreleased	Unreleased	Unreleased	
Maru Goukaku! Kihonjouhou Gijutsusha Shiken Heisei 26 Nendo-ban	Media5	Media5	March 26, 2014	Unreleased	Unreleased	Unreleased	
Maru Goukaku! Kihonjouhou Gijutsusha Shiken Heisei 28 Nendo-ban	Media5	Media5	February 17, 2016	Unreleased	Unreleased	Unreleased	
Maru Goukaku! Ouyoujouhou Gijutsusha Shiken Heisei 26 Nendo-ban	Media5	Media5	March 2, 2016	Unreleased	Unreleased	Unreleased	
Maru Goukaku! Ouyoujouhou Gijutsusha Shiken Heisei 28 Nendo-ban	Media5	Media5	March 2, 2016	Unreleased	Unreleased	Unreleased	
Maru Goukaku! Shakaifukushishi Shiken - Heisei 26 Nendohan	Media5	Media5	November 5, 2014	Unreleased	Unreleased	Unreleased	
Maru Goukaku! Shakaifukushishi Shiken - Heisei 28 Nendohan	Media5	Media5	April 27, 2016	Unreleased	Unreleased	Unreleased	
Maru Goukaku! Shakaifukushishi Shiken - Heisei 29 Nendohan	Media5	Media5	August 23, 2017	Unreleased	Unreleased	Unreleased	
Maru Goukaku! Sharoshi Shiken - Heisei 27 Nendohan	Media5	Media5	May 20, 2015	Unreleased	Unreleased	Unreleased	
Maru Goukaku! Takken Shiken - Heisei 26 Nendohan	Media5	Media5	May 21, 2014	Unreleased	Unreleased	Unreleased	
Maru Goukaku! Takken Shiken - Heisei 27 Nendohan	Media5	Media5	April 22, 2015	Unreleased	Unreleased	Unreleased	
Maru Goukaku! Takken Shiken - Heisei 28 Nendohan	Media5	Media5	April 6, 2016	Unreleased	Unreleased	Unreleased	
Maru Goukaku! Takken Shiken - Heisei 29 Nendohan	Media5	Media5	June 21, 2017	Unreleased	Unreleased	Unreleased	
Mii Maker	Nintendo	Nintendo	February 26, 2011	March 25, 2011	March 31, 2011	March 27, 2011	
Miitopia: Casting Call	Nintendo	Nintendo	July 13, 2017	July 13, 2017	Unreleased	November 2, 2016	
Minna no Decoration Card	The Location Inc	The Location Inc	April 28, 2015	Unreleased	Unreleased	Unreleased	
Motto Kigaru ni! Oekaki Koubou Plus	Collavier	Collavier	August 21, 2013	Unreleased	Unreleased	Unreleased	
Music on: Electric Guitar	Abylight	Abylight	Unreleased	March 12, 2015	Unreleased	March 5, 2015	
Musicverse: Electronic Keyboard	Abylight	Abylight	March 2, 2016	February 18, 2016	Unreleased	March 3, 2016	

== Expansions ==
For expansions beginning with N–Z, see N–Z.

List of Nintendo 3DS expansions
Title	Developer(s)	Publisher(s)	Release date				Ref.
Title	Developer(s)	Publisher(s)	Japan	North America	Australasia	Europe	Ref.
Animal Crossing: New Leaf – Welcome amiibo (expansion)	Nintendo	Nintendo	November 23, 2016	December 8, 2016	November 24, 2016	November 25, 2016	
Best of Arcade Games: Air Hockey	EKO Software	Bigben Interactive	Unreleased	August 13, 2015	Unreleased	February 12, 2015	
Best of Arcade Games: Brick Breaker	EKO Software	Bigben Interactive	Unreleased	August 6, 2015	Unreleased	February 5, 2015	
Best of Arcade Games: Bubble Buster	EKO Software	Bigben Interactive	Unreleased	August 13, 2015	Unreleased	February 19, 2015	
Best of Arcade Games: Tetraminos	EKO Software	Bigben Interactive	Unreleased	August 6, 2015	Unreleased	February 26, 2015	
Best of Board Games: Chess	EKO Software	Bigben Interactive	Unreleased	June 18, 2015	Unreleased	February 12, 2015	
Best of Board Games: Mahjong	Neko Entertainment	Bigben Interactive	Unreleased	July 30, 2015	Unreleased	February 5, 2015	
Best of Board Games: Solitaire	Neko Entertainment	Bigben Interactive	Unreleased	July 30, 2015	Unreleased	February 19, 2015	
Moon Chronicles: Episode 2	Renegade Kid	Renegade Kid	Unreleased	February 5, 2015	Unreleased	Unreleased	
Moon Chronicles: Episode 3	Renegade Kid	Renegade Kid	Unreleased	February 5, 2014	Unreleased	Unreleased	
Moon Chronicles: Episode 4	Renegade Kid	Renegade Kid	Unreleased	February 5, 2014	Unreleased	Unreleased	

== Bundles ==
For bundles beginning with N–Z, see N–Z.

List of Nintendo 3DS bundles
Title	Developer(s)	Publisher(s)	Release date				Ref.
Title	Developer(s)	Publisher(s)	Japan	North America	Australasia	Europe	Ref.
Atooi Collection	Atooi	Limited Run Games	Unreleased	August 7, 2020	Unreleased	Unreleased	
Azure Striker Gunvolt: Striker Pack	Inti Creates	Inti Creates	August 25, 2016	October 4, 2016	Unreleased	Unreleased	
BioHazard: The Mercenaries 3D & Revelations Value Pack	Capcom	Capcom	March 22, 2013	Unreleased	Unreleased	Unreleased	
Boku wa Koukuu Kanseikan: Airport Hero 3D - Narita / Haneda All Stars Pack	Sonic Powered	Sonic Powered	August 24, 2017	Unreleased	Unreleased	Unreleased	
Dai Gyakuten Saiban 1 & 2 Special Edition	Capcom	Capcom	August 3, 2017	Unreleased	Unreleased	Unreleased	
Disney 2-Pack - Frozen: Olaf's Quest + Big Hero 6: Battle in the Bay	1st Playable Productions	GameMill Entertainment	Unreleased	October 18, 2016	Unreleased	October 27, 2016	
Dobutsu no Mori Double Pack	Nintendo	Nintendo	December 3, 2015	Unreleased	Unreleased	Unreleased	
Dragon Ball: Chou Kyuukyoku Heroes W-Pack	Bandai Namco Games	Bandai Namco Games	December 17, 2015	Unreleased	Unreleased	Unreleased	
Dragon Ball: Extreme Fusion Pack	Bandai Namco Games	Bandai Namco Games	November 30, 2017	Unreleased	Unreleased	Unreleased	
DreamWorks Madagascar 3 & The Croods: Combo Pack	1st Playable Productions	GameMill Entertainment	Unreleased	March 25, 2014	Unreleased	November 15, 2013	
Fire Emblem Fates: Special Edition	Intelligent Systems; Nintendo SPD	Nintendo	Unreleased	February 19, 2016	Unreleased	Unreleased	
Guild01	Level 5	Level 5	May 31, 2012	Unreleased	Unreleased	Unreleased	
HakoBoy! Hakozume Box	HAL Labs	Nintendo	February 2, 2017	Unreleased	Unreleased	Unreleased	
Luigi's Mansion 2 / Mario Tennis Open - Happy Price Selection Double Pack	Nintendo	Nintendo	January 1, 2018	Unreleased	Unreleased	Unreleased	
Mario & Luigi Double Pack	Nintendo	Nintendo	December 3, 2015	Unreleased	Unreleased	Unreleased	
The Misshitsukara no Dasshutsu Archives 1	D3 Publisher	D3 Publisher	April 7, 2016	Unreleased	Unreleased	Unreleased	
The Misshitsukara no Dasshutsu Archives 2	D3 Publisher	D3 Publisher	April 7, 2016	Unreleased	Unreleased	Unreleased	
Monster Hunter XX: Double Cross / Monster Hunter Stories Twin Pack	Capcom	Capcom	December 14, 2017	Unreleased	Unreleased	Unreleased	

== See also ==
- 3D Classics
- List of cancelled Nintendo 3DS games
- List of DSiWare games and applications
- List of Nintendo DS games
- List of Nintendo Network games
- List of Nintendo Switch games
- List of Virtual Console games for Nintendo 3DS
- List of Wii U games
