= List of Ravenscourt games =

This is a list of games published by Plaion subsidiary, Ravenscourt.

== List of video games ==
| Title | Platform(s) | Release date | Developer | Notes | Ref. |
|---|---|---|---|---|---|
| Mining Industry Simulator | Linux | November 28, 2014 | Crafty Studios | | |
| Mining Industry Simulator | Macintosh | November 28, 2014 | Crafty Studios | | |
| Mining Industry Simulator | Microsoft Windows | November 28, 2014 | Crafty Studios | | |
| Farm Mechanic Simulator 2015 | Microsoft Windows | February 20, 2015 | PlayWay | | |
| Helicopter 2015: Natural Disasters | Microsoft Windows | April 2, 2015 | Si7Studio | | |
| Truck Mechanic Simulator 2015 | Microsoft Windows | April 30, 2015 | PlayWay | | |
| Baldur's Gate II: Enhanced Edition | Microsoft Windows | May 15, 2015 | Overhaul Games / Ossian Studios | Distributor | |
| Icewind Dale: Enhanced Edition | Microsoft Windows | May 15, 2015 | Overhaul Games | Distributor | |
| Construction Machines Simulator 2016 | Microsoft Windows | May 22, 2015 | PlayWay | | |
| Farm-Expert 2016 | Microsoft Windows | May 22, 2015 | Silden | | |
| Garfield Kart | Nintendo 3DS | June 26, 2015 | Most Wanted Entertainment | Distributor | |
| RaceRoom - ADAC GT Masters Experience 2014 | Microsoft Windows | June 26, 2015 | RaceRoom Entertainment | Distributor | |
| RaceRoom - DTM Experience 2014 | Microsoft Windows | June 26, 2015 | RaceRoom Entertainment | Distributor | |
| Paddington: Adventures in London | Nintendo 3DS | July 3, 2015 | Neko Entertainment | Distributor | |
| Mystery Maze of Balthasar Castle | Microsoft Windows | July 10, 2015 | Caipirinha Games | Distributor | |
| Depth | Microsoft Windows | July 31, 2015 | Depth Team / Digital Confectioners | Distributor | |
| Broken Sword 5: The Serpent's Curse | Xbox One | September 4, 2015 | Revolution Software | Distributor | |
| Let's Sing 2016 | Microsoft Windows | October 23, 2015 | Voxler | | |
| Let's Sing 2016 | PlayStation 4 | October 23, 2015 | Voxler | | |
| Let's Sing 2016 | Wii | October 23, 2015 | Voxler | | |
| Let's Sing 2016 | Xbox One | October 23, 2015 | Voxler | | |
| Now That's What I Call Sing | PlayStation 4 | October 23, 2015 | Voxler | | |
| Now That's What I Call Sing | Xbox One | October 23, 2015 | Voxler | | |
| Mini Metro | Microsoft Windows | November 6, 2015 | Dinosaur Polo | Distributor | |
| Horse Life 4 | Nintendo 3DS | November 12, 2015 | Independent Arts | | |
| Farm-Expert 2016: Fruit Company DLC | Microsoft Windows | 2015 | Silden | | |
| Undercover Missions: Operation Kursk K-141 | Microsoft Windows | December 11, 2015 | The Game Species | | |
| The Interactive Adventures of Dog Mendonça & Pizzaboy | Linux | March 4, 2016 | OKAM Studio | | |
| The Interactive Adventures of Dog Mendonça & Pizzaboy | Macintosh | March 4, 2016 | OKAM Studio | | |
| The Interactive Adventures of Dog Mendonça & Pizzaboy | Microsoft Windows | March 4, 2016 | OKAM Studio | | |
| Obscuritas | Macintosh | March 18, 2016 | VIS-Games | | |
| Obscuritas | Microsoft Windows | March 18, 2016 | VIS-Games | | |
| Car Mechanic Simulator 2015 | Microsoft Windows | May 22, 2016 | Red Dot Games | Distributor | |
| APB Reloaded | Xbox One | May 31, 2016 | Reloaded Productions | | |
| Mount & Blade: Warband | PlayStation 4 | September 16, 2016 | TaleWorlds Entertainment | Distributor | |
| Let's Sing 2017 | PlayStation 4 | October 14, 2016 | Voxler | | |
| Let's Sing 2017 | Wii | October 14, 2016 | Voxler | | |
| Let's Sing 2017 | Xbox One | October 14, 2016 | Voxler | | |
| Now That's What I Call Sing 2 | PlayStation 4 | October 14, 2016 | Voxler | | |
| Now That's What I Call Sing 2 | Xbox One | October 14, 2016 | Voxler | | |
| Emergency 2017 | Microsoft Windows | October 27, 2016 | Sixteen Tons Entertainment | | |
| Kona | Microsoft Windows | March 17, 2017 | Parabole | | |
| Kona | PlayStation 4 | March 17, 2017 | Parabole | | |
| Kona | Xbox One | March 17, 2017 | Parabole | | |
| Let's Sing 2018 | PlayStation 4 | October 20, 2017 | Voxler | | |
| Let's Sing 2018 | Wii | October 20, 2017 | Voxler | | |
| Let's Sing 2018 | Nintendo Switch | November 24, 2017 | Voxler | | |
| Kona | Nintendo Switch | March 9, 2018 | Parabole | | |
| Illusion: A Tale of the Mind | Microsoft Windows | June 1, 2018 | Frima Studio | | |
| Illusion: A Tale of the Mind | PlayStation 4 | June 1, 2018 | Frima Studio | | |
| Illusion: A Tale of the Mind | Xbox One | June 1, 2018 | Frima Studio | | |
| Kona VR | Microsoft Windows | June 19, 2018 | Parabole | | |
| Kona VR | PlayStation 4 | June 19, 2018 | Parabole | | |
| 428: Shibuya Scramble | PlayStation 4 | September 21, 2018 | Abstraction Games | Distributor | |
| Broken Sword 5: The Serpent's Curse | Nintendo Switch | September 21, 2018 | Revolution Software | Distributor | |
| Fire Pro Wrestling World | PlayStation 4 | September 28, 2018 | ZEX Corporation | Distributor | |
| Let's Sing 2019 | Nintendo Switch | October 26, 2018 | Voxler | | |
| Let's Sing 2019 | PlayStation 4 | October 26, 2018 | Voxler | | |
| Steins;Gate Elite | Nintendo Switch | February 19, 2019 | 5PB | Distributor | |
| Steins;Gate Elite | PlayStation 4 | February 19, 2019 | 5PB | Distributor | |
| Zanki Zero: Last Beginning | PlayStation 4 | April 9, 2019 | Spike Chunsoft | Distributor | |
| Agony | PlayStation 4 | May 29, 2019 | Madmind Studio | | |
| Agony | Xbox One | May 29, 2019 | Madmind Studio | | |
| Car Mechanic Simulator | PlayStation 4 | June 25, 2019 | Red Dot Games | Distributor | |
| Car Mechanic Simulator | Xbox One | June 25, 2019 | Red Dot Games | Distributor | |
| Redeemer: Enhanced Edition | Nintendo Switch | July 19, 2019 | Sobaka Studio | Distributor | |
| Redeemer: Enhanced Edition | PlayStation 4 | July 19, 2019 | Sobaka Studio | Distributor | |
| Redeemer: Enhanced Edition | Xbox One | July 19, 2019 | Sobaka Studio | Distributor | |
| Let's Sing 2020 | Nintendo Switch | October 25, 2019 | Voxler | | |
| Let's Sing 2020 | PlayStation 4 | October 25, 2019 | Voxler | | |
| Let's Sing 2020 | Xbox One | October 25, 2019 | Voxler | | |
| Ash of Gods: Redemption | Nintendo Switch | January 31, 2020 | Aurum Dust | Distributor | |
| Ash of Gods: Redemption | PlayStation 4 | January 31, 2020 | Aurum Dust | Distributor | |
| Ash of Gods: Redemption | Xbox One | January 31, 2020 | Aurum Dust | Distributor | |
| Cooking Mama: Cookstar | Nintendo Switch | March 31, 2020 | 1st Playable Productions | Distributor | |
| Kona | Stadia | August 1, 2020 | Parabole | | |
| Relicta | Microsoft Windows | August 4, 2020 | Mighty Polygon | | |
| Relicta | PlayStation 4 | August 4, 2020 | Mighty Polygon | | |
| Relicta | Stadia | August 4, 2020 | Mighty Polygon | | |
| Relicta | Xbox One | August 4, 2020 | Mighty Polygon | | |
| Let’s Sing presents Queen | Nintendo Switch | October 2, 2020 | Voxler | | |
| Let’s Sing presents Queen | PlayStation 4 | October 2, 2020 | Voxler | | |
| Let’s Sing presents Queen | Xbox One | October 2, 2020 | Voxler | | |
| 9 Monkeys of Shaolin | Microsoft Windows | October 16, 2020 | Sobaka Studio | Distributor | |
| 9 Monkeys of Shaolin | Nintendo Switch | October 16, 2020 | Sobaka Studio | Distributor | |
| 9 Monkeys of Shaolin | PlayStation 4 | October 16, 2020 | Sobaka Studio | Distributor | |
| 9 Monkeys of Shaolin | Xbox One | October 16, 2020 | Sobaka Studio | Distributor | |
| Let's Sing 2021 | Nintendo Switch | November 13, 2020 | Voxler | | |
| Let's Sing 2021 | PlayStation 4 | November 13, 2020 | Voxler | | |
| Let's Sing 2021 | Xbox One | November 13, 2020 | Voxler | | |
| Relicta | Nintendo Switch | April 15, 2021 | Mighty Polygon | | |
| Relicta | Xbox Series X/S | April 15, 2021 | Mighty Polygon | | |
| Siege Survival: Gloria Victis | Microsoft Windows | May 18, 2021 | Black Eye Games / FishTankStudio | | |
| Siege Survival: Gloria Victis | GeForce Now | May 18, 2021 | Black Eye Games / FishTankStudio | | |
| Siege Survival: Gloria Victis – The Lost Caravan | Microsoft Windows | June 25, 2021 | Black Eye Games / FishTankStudio | | |
| Siege Survival: Gloria Victis – The Lost Caravan | GeForce Now | June 25, 2021 | Black Eye Games / FishTankStudio | | |
| Road 96 | Microsoft Windows | August 16, 2021 | DigixArt | | |
| Road 96 | Nintendo Switch | August 16, 2021 | DigixArt | | |
| Road 96 | GeForce Now | August 19, 2021 | DigixArt | | |
| ProtoCorgi | Microsoft Windows | August 26, 2021 | Kemono Games | | |
| ProtoCorgi | Nintendo Switch | August 26, 2021 | Kemono Games | | |
| Dice Legacy | GeForce Now | September 9, 2021 | DestinyBit | | |
| Dice Legacy | Microsoft Windows | September 9, 2021 | DestinyBit | | |
| Dice Legacy | Nintendo Switch | September 9, 2021 | DestinyBit | | |
| Let's Sing 2022 | Nintendo Switch | November 23, 2021 | Voxler | | |
| Let's Sing 2022 | PlayStation 4 | November 23, 2021 | Voxler | | |
| Let's Sing 2022 | PlayStation 5 | November 23, 2021 | Voxler | | |
| Let's Sing 2022 | Xbox One | November 23, 2021 | Voxler | | |
| Let's Sing 2022 | Xbox Series X/S | November 23, 2021 | Voxler | | |
| Kona | PlayStation 5 | December 9, 2021 | Parabole | | |
| Kona | Xbox Series X/S | December 9, 2021 | Parabole | | |
| Dice Legacy: Corrupted Fates | Microsoft Windows | April 14, 2022 | DestinyBit | | |
| Dice Legacy: Corrupted Fates | Nintendo Switch | April 14, 2022 | DestinyBit | | |
| Road 96 | PlayStation 4 | April 14, 2022 | DigixArt | | |
| Road 96 | PlayStation 5 | April 14, 2022 | DigixArt | | |
| Road 96 | Xbox One | April 14, 2022 | DigixArt | | |
| Road 96 | Xbox Series X/S | April 14, 2022 | DigixArt | | |
| Let's Get Fit | Nintendo Switch | May 13, 2022 | Exkee, Voxler | | |
| Let’s Sing presents Abba | Nintendo Switch | October 4, 2022 | Voxler | | |
| Let’s Sing presents Abba | PlayStation 4 | October 4, 2022 | Voxler | | |
| Let’s Sing presents Abba | PlayStation 5 | October 4, 2022 | Voxler | | |
| Let’s Sing presents Abba | Xbox One | October 4, 2022 | Voxler | | |
| Let’s Sing presents Abba | Xbox Series X/S | October 4, 2022 | Voxler | | |
| Yum Yum: Cookstar | Microsoft Windows | November 11, 2022 | Planet Entertainment | | |
| Yum Yum: Cookstar | Nintendo Switch | November 11, 2022 | Planet Entertainment | | |
| Yum Yum: Cookstar | PlayStation 4 | November 11, 2022 | Planet Entertainment | | |
| Yum Yum: Cookstar | Xbox One | November 11, 2022 | Planet Entertainment | | |
| Floodland | Microsoft Windows | November 15, 2022 | Vile Monarch | | |
| Let's Sing 2023 | Nintendo Switch | November 15, 2022 | Voxler | | |
| Let's Sing 2023 | PlayStation 4 | November 15, 2022 | Voxler | | |
| Let's Sing 2023 | PlayStation 5 | November 15, 2022 | Voxler | | |
| Let's Sing 2023 | Xbox One | November 15, 2022 | Voxler | | |
| Let's Sing 2023 | Xbox Series X/S | November 15, 2022 | Voxler | | |
| Kona II: Brume | Microsoft Windows | October 18, 2023 | Parabole | | |
| Kona II: Brume | Nintendo Switch | October 18, 2023 | Parabole | | |
| Kona II: Brume | PlayStation 4 | October 18, 2023 | Parabole | | |
| Kona II: Brume | PlayStation 5 | October 18, 2023 | Parabole | | |
| Kona II: Brume | Xbox One | October 18, 2023 | Parabole | | |
| Kona II: Brume | Xbox Series X/S | October 18, 2023 | Parabole | | |
| Night is Coming | Microsoft Windows | 2025 | Wild Forest Studios | | |
