= Cooking Mama: Cookstar =

2020 video game

- Developer: 1st Playable Productions
- Publishers: Planet Entertainment (first North American release); Ravenscourt (European, Australian, and second North American releases)
- Composers: Sara Sakurai; Satoshi Okubo; Masayoshi Ishi
- Series: Cooking Mama
- Engine: Unity
- Platforms: Nintendo Switch; PlayStation 4
- Release: Nintendo Switch: AU: March 30, 2020; NA: March 31, 2020; EU: April 28, 2020; PlayStation 4: NA: March 25, 2021; AU: July 23, 2021
- Genres: Simulation, minigame
- Mode: Single-player

Cooking Mama: Cookstar is a cookery simulation-styled minigame compilation video game, and the unofficial sixth installment in the Cooking Mama series of video games. The game was the first entry in the Cooking Mama series since Cooking Mama 5: Bon Appétit! (2014), and the first Cooking Mama game to release on a home console since Cooking Mama: World Kitchen (2008) or Babysitting Mama (2010).

The game was briefly released before its official release date on the Nintendo Switch eShop on March 26, 2020, but was taken down just a few hours later due to legal issues between the publisher, Planet Entertainment, and the owner of the Cooking Mama intellectual property (IP), Office Create. Office Create publicly issued a statement condemning the breach of contract on April 15, 2020. The game was eventually re-released by the publisher Ravenscourt in March 2021, who also published it in Europe and Australia in 2020. Cooking Mama: Cookstar is no longer available for purchase as of November 2022, when the International Court of Arbitration ruled that Office Create's IP rights had been infringed by the game and granted their request to have it removed from sale. After its removal, it was revamped into another game called Yum Yum Cookstar using similar mechanics.

== Gameplay ==
Cooking Mama: Cookstar plays similarly to previous entries in the series. New in Cookstar is the ability to share photos of completed recipes on social media.

== Development ==
Cookstar was initially revealed as Cooking Mama: Coming Home to Mama in August 2019, with an estimated release date for Q3 of that year. Its publisher claimed that it was the first implementation of blockchain technology on a major video game console, using the technology to implement a form of digital rights management; however, the details of this proposal were never expanded upon publicly, and blockchain support is not present in the final game in any form. The game was developed by American studio 1st Playable Productions, but the company later removed all mentions of the game from its website.

== Release ==
Cookstar ostensibly released on March 31, 2020. The game was briefly made available on the Nintendo Switch eShop, but pulled shortly after its release. Additionally, an announced PlayStation 4 version was not released at the time despite being listed on several storefronts. IP rights holder Office Create later stated that Planet Entertainment was not authorized to release Cooking Mama games on the platform.

Unconfirmed rumors that the game acted as a cryptocurrency miner emerged shortly after its release. 1st Playable responded that the implementation of blockchain technology was only "hypothetical" and explained that the game's removal from Nintendo eShop was due to an ongoing legal dispute between the publisher Planet Entertainment and IP rights holder Office Create. Office Create stated it has started taking legal action against Planet as Office Create had terminated their license to use Cooking Mama on March 30, 2020, after which Planet had started selling the game.

The game received a full North American release in 2021 on both Switch and PS4 platforms. In November 2022, Office Create announced that they had won their legal battle against Planet, and that the game would be removed from sale.

After the lawsuit, 1st Playable Productions and Planet Entertainment would release a spinoff title Yum Yum Cookstar (stylized as yum yum cookstar) for the Xbox One and Xbox Series S and X consoles on September 21, 2022, the Switch on October 4, 2022, Steam on November 11, 2022 (with most of the development for the Xbox and Steam versions by Ravenscourt), and the PS4 on November 26, 2022. The game plays very similarly to the original Cookstar with the main differences being a different cast of characters being the female lead along with a roster of judges, a change in overall art style, and voice acting and some of the dialog written by staff from National Lampoon with sound and music produced by Nile Rodgers.

== Reception ==
Reception

Aggregate score
Aggregator	Score
Metacritic	46/100

Review scores
Publication	Score
IGN	3/10
Nintendo Life	3/10
Nintendo World Report	4.5/10

The Nintendo Switch version of Cooking Mama: Cookstar received "generally unfavorable" reviews from critics, according to the review aggregation website Metacritic.

Travis Northup of IGN gave the game 3 out of 10, praising the detailed recipes featured in the game, but criticizing the monotonous gameplay, poor motion controls, "nightmarish" voice acting, and lack of meaningful progression. He also noted that the game does not offer anything new compared to past entries, which combined with the flaws, make Cookstar a "tedious game that does almost nothing well."

Conversely, TheGamer's Bella Blondeau gave Cookstar a 4 out of 5. She praised the game's variety and amount of content, as well as the "nuance" to mastering the mechanics. In addition, she praised the game's photo mode and Yoko Nishino's "charming" performance as Mama, stating that the character felt "like a tangible, adorable dork of a mother."

PETA, the American animal rights organization, praised the game for including a vegetarian mode.
