= Cooking Mama 3: Shop & Chop =

2009 video game

- Developer: Cooking Mama Limited
- Publishers: JP: Taito; NA: Majesco; PAL: 505 Games
- Composer: Masayoshi Ishi
- Series: Cooking Mama
- Platform: Nintendo DS
- Release: NA: October 20, 2009; AU: November 12, 2009; EU: November 13, 2009; JP: November 26, 2009
- Genres: Simulation, minigame
- Modes: Single-player, multiplayer

Cooking Mama 3: Shop & Chop (Note: Cooking Mama 3 (クッキング ママ3, Kukkingu Mama 3)) released as Cooking Mama 3 in Japan, Europe and Australia, is the sequel to the Nintendo DS video game Cooking Mama 2: Dinner with Friends and the third installment in the Cooking Mama series. Developed by 505 Games, Majesco, and Taito, Shop & Chop features five different game modes, including two new ones, over 80 different recipes, 200 unique mini-games, four-player multiplayer, and the classic gameplay.

The sequel to this game, Cooking Mama 4: Kitchen Magic for the Nintendo 3DS, was released on November 16, 2011.

== Gameplay ==
Following the style of the Cooking Mama series, the game is loosely based on a cooking simulation, though more focused on the mini-games in comparison to previous titles in the series. Recipes are divided into mini-games, and by successfully completing the mini-games, a meal is created. Many aspects of the game are now customizable, such as the colors of the pots and pans, the countertop and background, and even Mama herself. Mama can be dressed up in new outfits, which also include accessories. Graphics have also been slightly enhanced, and there is an added feature of importing the vegetables the player has grown in Gardening Mama.

This installment includes recipes such as Marshmallow, Candy Apples, Pickles, French Cruller, Korean Barbecue, Baukuchen, Vongole Bianco, Fried Shrimp, Cabbage Rolls, Tempura, Dried Squid, Cheese Risotto, Potato Wedges, Sushi, and many more. Hidden recipes can be unlocked after obtaining the initial 64. The player can also grow their own ingredients or buy them in the new grocery store mode, Let's Shop.

=== Game modes ===
Let's Shop is a feature added to Shop & Chop. The mode features five different levels, each of which is progressively harder than the last. Instead of cooking with Mama, the player is sent to the grocery store to pick up supplies. The player controls Ichigo (Mama's daughter) with the stylus in the bottom half of the DS screen and leads her around the store to obtain the supplies while racing against the clock. However, running into other customers, such as mothers with babies or store employees, causes the player to play mini-games that also count against the clock. The mini-games are generated at random, and no instructions are given. If the player fails to win the mini-game, Ichigo loses a heart, and after she loses three, she goes home. By successfully completing the shopping trip, the player is awarded items to customize the kitchen or outfits/accessories to dress up Mama.

== Reception ==
Reception

Aggregate score
Aggregator	Score
Metacritic	65/100

Review scores
Publication	Score
1Up.com	B−
Game Informer	6.5/10
GamePro	2.5/5
GameTrailers	7.3/10
GameZone	7/10
IGN	7/10
Nintendo Power	6/10
Nintendo World Report	8/10
Official Nintendo Magazine	62%
PALGN	7/10

The game received "mixed or average reviews" according to video game review aggregator website Metacritic.
