= Babysitting Mama =

2010 video game

- Developer: Cooking Mama Limited
- Publishers: NA: Majesco; PAL: 505 Games; JP: Office Create
- Composer: Yasuhiro Kawakami
- Series: Cooking Mama
- Platform: Wii
- Release: NA: November 5, 2010; AU: November 11, 2010; EU: November 12, 2010; JP: December 2, 2010
- Genres: Simulation, minigame
- Modes: Single-player, multiplayer

Babysitting Mama, known in Japan as Babysitter Mama (ベビーシッターママ, Bebīshittā Mama) is a babysitting simulation-styled minigame compilation video game released for the Wii. It is the third spin-off from the Cooking Mama series; the first two were Gardening Mama and Crafting Mama. It includes a stuffed toy human baby to play with and the player slips its Wii Remote inside. It includes 50 different baby mini games and activities, like playing, washing, etc.

== Gameplay ==
Players are challenged to complete various activities and errands for each of six babies, with different skin tones, utilizing the included baby controller, which is operated by inserting the Wii Remote inside with the Nunchuk connected. Each collection of activities assigned to each baby are represented in a book that groups them all into several pages that unlock as the player progresses by clearing these activities successfully.

Players are scored on how well they complete each activity with a medal system, similar to the main Cooking Mama series; gold medals are awarded for flawless completion of an activity and lesser medals granted if the player made mistakes or partially completed the objective. Medals are also awarded at the end of a series of activities pertaining to a particular baby. Babies will also dynamically respond to players' performance through audio and visual cues, including the Wii Remote speaker.

Players are warned in-game against shaking a baby, as it is dangerous to do so in real life. Excessive movement of the baby controller will briefly suspend play with a reminder of such warning, but will otherwise not penalize player performance. A practice mode is also available for each activity to help players brush up on any that they may find difficult.

== Release ==
Every retail copy of Babysitting Mama came in a cardboard box shaped like a crib for the plush baby to put it in for sleeping, which contained a Wii disc and a plush baby.

Majesco was slated to release Babysitting Mama alongside another similar game developed by Zoink Games, WiiWaa, which was similarly controlled with a plush toy monster that the Wii Remote is inserted into. However, without sufficient funds to support the release of both games, Majesco turned down a publishing deal for WiiWaa in favor of Babysitting Mama, reasoning that Mama was part of a previously successful and more familiar intellectual property, and was thus more likely to succeed.

== Reception ==
Reception

Review scores
Publication	Score
Famitsu	31/40
IGN	4.5/10
Common Sense Media	4/5

In Japan, Famitsu gave the game a score of three eights and a seven, for a total of 31 out of 40.

Western critics were generally less favorable. IGN gave it a negative review, summarizing it as “boring and gimmicky”. Game Informer also panned the game, saying that its minigames “make Mario Party’s look like God of War” and comparing it to a contraceptive.

In contrast, Common Sense Media gave the game a positive review, praising the “sweet and gentle” tone and positive messages, such as being gentle and not shaking the baby.
