= Tides of Tomorrow (video game) =

2026 video game

- Developer: DigixArt
- Publisher: THQ Nordic
- Director: Adrien Poncet
- Producer: Kevin Bard
- Platforms: PlayStation 5; Windows; Xbox Series X/S
- Release: April 22, 2026
- Genre: Adventure
- Mode: Multiplayer

Tides of Tomorrow is a first-person adventure video game developed by DigixArt and published by THQ Nordic. It is an asynchronous multiplayer game in which players assume control of a Tidewalker, whose actions in their game's world may affect the world state of other players. It was released in April 2026 for PlayStation 5, Windows and Xbox Series X/S.

== Gameplay ==
Tides of Tomorrow is a first-person adventure video game. Players take control of a "Tidewalker" and explore an ocean planet, visiting communities on floating platforms on foot and using a boat to travel between locations.

While players mostly experience the game solo, they must first connect their world state to that of another player. As they progress, they will see "Visions" of how the previous player interacted with the world. The gameplay actions of the previous player leave significant consequences for the current player. Non-playable characters (NPCs) react to the current player's behaviors based on their memories of interactions with the previous player. For instance, a selfish action done by the previous player may cause NPCs to be more suspicious. Mission conditions may also be altered. For instance, an area may become more guarded if the previous player approached the mission violently. The previous player can choose to help by leaving materials behind, and the Visions can aid the current player in exploring alternative paths, solving puzzles, and avoiding traps. However, the current player is not compelled to follow the previous player's path and remains free to make their own decisions. As each mission concludes, players can choose to continue follow the path of the same player, or choose another one. As an adventure game, Tides of Tomorrow integrates the actions of the previous player as well as the choices of the current player to tell a branching story.

== Story ==
The game is set in a fictional planet named Elynd, where a cataclysmic flood has destroyed most of civilization. The players assume control of a amnesic survivor named a "Tidewalker", a person who find themselves afflicted with a mysterious disease named "Plastemia", a condition that gradually turns living beings into plastic. Players must search for a cure while sailing across the sea and exploring diverse floating settlements.

== Development ==
The game is currently being developed by DigixArt, the developer of Road 96. The original idea for Tides of Tomorrow stemmed from a desire to integrate Road 96's narrative roguelike structure into a multiplayer game, in which players can leave resources behind for other players to aid their success. They were also inspired by the asynchronous multiplayer functionalities of games such as Death Stranding, the Dark Souls series, and Phantom Abyss, in which experienced players can leave clue or aid the progression of other players indirectly.

Game director Adrien Poncet called development very challenging, noting the absence of a blueprint as no other narrative game in the market features asynchronous multiplayer. To validate their asynchronous multiplayer concept, the DigixArt team built an early text-based prototype that generated quantitative data on how frequently one player's choices triggered changes in another's session. The team then used it to prioritize story elements that resonated with playtesters. To make the asynchronous multiplayer more tangible, the team added animations of previous players' actions, helping the current player better visualize the experience. Initially, the game allowed seamless travel between settlements, but this feature was ultimately cut so the team could allocate more resources to refining the multiplayer system. The game's story explored themes such as climate change, where collaborative efforts (represented through the game's asynchronous multiplayer) can help resolve the crisis. According to Poncet, the game was about "keeping hope alive in a world where everything seems lost, and about helping each other in a common effort to make things better".

Tides of Tomorrow was unveiled on June 7, 2024. The game was originally set to be released on February 24, 2026 for PlayStation 5, Windows and Xbox Series X/S, though it was delayed to April 22 the same year.

== Reception ==
Reception

Aggregate scores
Aggregator	Score
Metacritic	(PC) 76/100 (XSX) 81/100 (PS5) 71/100
OpenCritic	66% recommend (Note: Based on 54 reviews)

Review scores
Publication	Score
Game Informer	8/10
GamesRadar+	4/5

According to the review aggregation website Metacritic, the Xbox Series X and PlayStation 5 versions of Tides of Tomorrow both received generally favorable reviews from critics, while the PC version received "mixed or average" reviews. Fellow review aggregator OpenCritic assessed that the game received strong approval, being recommended by 61% of critics.
