= Car Mechanic Simulator 2015 =

2015 video game

- Developer: Red Dot Games
- Publisher: PlayWay S.A.
- Series: Car Mechanic Simulator
- Engine: Unity
- Platforms: PC, Android
- Release: WW: 23 April 2015
- Genres: Simulation, automotive

Car Mechanic Simulator 2015 is a simulation video game depicting the work of an automotive mechanic. It was released on 23 April 2015 for the PC, with a mobile release the following year. The game is a sequel to Car Mechanic Simulator 2014, and was followed by Car Mechanic Simulator 2018 and Car Mechanic Simulator 2021.

== Gameplay ==
The game is played from a first-person perspective, with the player able to walk freely around the shop and a few other areas. Instead of levels, the game is divided into "jobs" - customer vehicles with a list of problems - which the player must troubleshoot and repair. Upon receiving a job and a vehicle, the player is required to remove, inspect, and replace the relevant broken parts. When a vehicle is reassembled, it may be taken for a test drive before being returned to the customer.

== Reception ==
Reception

Aggregate score
Aggregator	Score
Metacritic	68/100

Car Mechanic Simulator received average reviews from critics, with a 68/100 positive rating according to Metacritic.

PC World rated the game 3.5 stars out of 5, praising the detail but criticizing the lack of variety as a "grind".

Polygon editor Griffin McElroy received the game positively in a video demo, but the website did not give an official review.

PC Gamer's Christopher Livingston reviewed the game satirically, complaining that "it doesn't offer the most advanced simulation gameplay experience ever" as it lacks argumentative customers, slow computer systems, and the ability to frustrate clients by altering small details of their cars' interiors.

== Downloadable content ==
A number of downloadable content expansion packs with packs were offered, containing additional vehicles to repair:

- DeLorean DLC
- Maserati DLC
- Performance DLC
- Mercedes-Benz DLC
- Pickup & SUV DLC
- Trader Pack DLC
- VisualTuning DLC
- Youngtimer DLC
- Total Modifications DLC
- Bentley DLC
- Car Stripping DLC
