= Camping Mama: Outdoor Adventures =

2011 video game

- North American box art
- Developer: Cooking Mama Limited
- Publishers: JP: Office Create; NA: Majesco; PAL: 505 Games
- Series: Cooking Mama
- Platform: Nintendo DS
- Release: JP: July 14, 2011; NA: September 13, 2011; EU: November 25, 2011
- Genres: Simulation, minigame
- Modes: Single-player, multiplayer

Camping Mama: Outdoor Adventures, known in Japan as Camping Mama + Papa (キャンピングママ+パパ Kyanpingu Mama + Papa) and in the PAL region as Cooking Mama World: Outdoor Adventures, is a 2011 video game for the Nintendo DS. It is a spin-off title in the Cooking Mama series. It features 38 levels with 100 camping-themed mini-games using the touch screen.

== Development ==
The game was released in July 2011 in Japan, September 2011 in North America, and November 2011 in Europe. It was later bundled with Cooking Mama and released as Mama's Combo Pack Vol. 1 in North America, Europe, and Australia in late 2012.

== Reception ==
Reception

Aggregate score
Aggregator	Score
Metacritic	51/100

Camping Mama received "mixed" reviews according to video game review aggregator website Metacritic.
