= Cooking Mama 2: Dinner with Friends =

2007 video game

- Developer: Cooking Mama Limited
- Publishers: JP: Taito; NA: Majesco; PAL: 505 Games
- Series: Cooking Mama
- Platform: Nintendo DS
- Release: NA: November 13, 2007; JP: November 15, 2007; EU: February 15, 2008; AU: February 21, 2008
- Genres: Simulation, minigames
- Modes: Single-player, multiplayer

Cooking Mama 2: Dinner with Friends (Note: Cooking Mama 2 (クッキングママ 2, Kukkingu Mama 2)) (also known as Cooking Mama 2 in PAL Regions and stylized as cookıng mama 2 DINNER WITH FRIENDS) is the sequel to the Nintendo DS video game Cooking Mama and its Wii spin off, Cooking Mama: Cook Off. The game has twice as many minigames as the original, new recipes, and a new multiplayer "Cook Off" mode. The game includes voice clips similar to the ones used in Cooking Mama: Cook Off.

== Gameplay ==
A screen capture of Cooking Mama 2: Dinner With Friends, where a player is cutting corn and Mama is dressed up to cheer for the player

As in the original The Cooking Mama, players in The Cooking Mama 2: Dinner with Friends, prepare various culinary dishes using the Nintendo DS's touch screen. Following the on-screen instructions of the titular "Mama", the player uses the stylus to perform various activities such as chopping vegetables or mixing ingredients. Each of these tasks is performed by completing a short minigame, with a number of minigames strung together to form an entire dish from a catalog of 80 different recipes.

After completing a dish, the player's cooking performance is evaluated and given a numerical score (out of 100) along with a corresponding medal. Failing to accomplish a step in Let's Cook mode or getting a "fail" within steps (in various ranges), the player will receive a "Broken Silver" medal, in which the medal is similar to that of the silver medal with an addition: a crack. Unlike in previous Cooking Mama titles, bonuses earned during minigames do not influence the overall score, but instead accumulate as "bonus stars". For every 5 such bonuses which are earned, the player earns an unlockable item upon completion of the recipe.

Recipes include baguettes, T-bone steak, california roll, ravioli, churros, crepes, sliced burdock root, bananas foster, apple pie, pizza, escargot, pancakes, waffles, meatloaf, ice cream, chili dogs, corn soup, kimchi, macaroon, scones, popcorn, peanut butter, Sea Bream Carpaccio, Eel rice bowl, Squid fried rice and more.

=== Other modes ===
In the (marginally) more advanced Let's Cook! mode, the player is tasked with preparing a recipe without instructions between steps and without making a mistake that could ruin the fun of the game. This is done ostensibly at the request of Mama or one of 9 different "friends", who "taste" the dish and provide feedback such as "It's Delicious!" If the recipe is completed without failing any individual step. Assuming the dish is edible, the player may then be rewarded with an unlockable item or introduced to a new friend who was not previously available. If the player fails to complete a step, or makes a serious blunder, such as dropping an entire egg (excluding the shell) while separating the yolk, or spilling the ingredients while mixing with a whisk, the "friend" ordering the recipe declares the dish inedible, and as done in the "Cook with Mama" mode, a "Broken Silver" medal is awarded instead.

Lastly, in the Cooking Contest mode, Cooking Mama 2 supports wireless multiplayer, with up to 4 players able to play using a single copy of the game (leveraging the DS "Download Play" feature). During such a contest, players compete in individual minigames without actually working towards completion of dishes.

== Reception ==
Reception

Aggregate score
Aggregator	Score
Metacritic	70/100

Review scores
Publication	Score
Eurogamer	6/10
Famitsu	28/40
GameSpot	6/10
GameSpy	3.5/5
IGN	7/10
Nintendo Power	7/10

The game received "average" reviews according to video game review aggregator website Metacritic. In Japan, Famitsu gave it a total score of 28 out of 40.

Cooking Mama 2 received a "Platinum" sales award from the Entertainment and Leisure Software Publishers Association (ELSPA), indicating sales of at least 300,000 copies in the United Kingdom.

=== Awards ===
In their "Best of 2007" Awards, 1UP.com editors awarded Cooking Mama 2 "Best Console Casual Game".

In 2008 Cooking Mama 2 was nominated for BAFTA Children's Kids Vote Award, but lost to Hannah Montana.
