= Gardening Mama 2: Forest Friends =

2013 video game

- North American boxart
- Developer: Office Create
- Publishers: JP: Office Create; NA: Majesco; PAL: Nintendo
- Series: Cooking Mama
- Platform: Nintendo 3DS
- Release: JP: September 26, 2013; NA: April 29, 2014; KOR: December 18, 2014; EU: March 6, 2015; AU: March 7, 2015
- Genre: Simulation

Gardening Mama 2: Forest Friends (ガーデニングママ：ママと森のなかまたち Gādeningu Mama: Mama to Mori no Naka Ma-Tachi) is a gardening simulation-styled video game for the Nintendo 3DS which was released in Japan on September 26, 2013, in North America on April 29, 2014, in Europe on March 6, 2015, and in Australia a day later. It is the sequel of the Nintendo DS game Gardening Mama.

== Gameplay ==
Players use the stylus as a gardening tool, allowing them to grow over 50 different types of plants. They may trade points for items and decorations for their garden and to acquire new activities, including multi-player ones featuring Mama's friends and family.

== Development ==
Gardening Mama 2: Forest Friends was first announced for the Nintendo 3DS on June 6, 2013, with a release date of September 2013 for Japan.

On March 3, 2014, Majesco confirmed that Gardening Mama 2: Forest Friends would be released in North America in April 2014.

== Reception ==
Reception

Aggregate score
Aggregator	Score
Metacritic	43/100

Review scores
Publication	Score
Famitsu	29/40
Nintendo Life	3/10
Nintendo World Report	3.5/10

The game received "generally unfavorable reviews" according to video game review aggregator website Metacritic. In Japan, Famitsu gave it a score of two eights, one six, and one seven, for a total of 29 out of 40.
