= World of Guns: Gun Disassembly =

2013 video game

- Developer: Noble Empire Corp.
- Publisher: Noble Empire Corp.
- Series: Gun Disassembly
- Engine: Unity
- Platforms: Android; Facebook; iOS; Mac OS X; Windows; SteamOS; VK
- Release: WW: November 2013
- Genres: Simulation, puzzle
- Mode: Single-player

World of Guns: Gun Disassembly is a cross-genre simulation and puzzle video game that allows the player to operate and disassemble various firearms, as well as other mechanisms like automobiles, AFVs and aircraft. The game is the latest iteration of Noble Empire's Disassembly series, first released in 2010 on iOS, expanding on the feature set and library of interactive models.

The software can be used as both an interactive firearms reference source and encyclopedia, and a casual puzzle game with a goal of disassembling and assembling models in the correct sequence and in the least possible time.

Noble Empire's Valerii Zadorozhnyi, a trained Ukrainian philologist from Kyiv, is the main organizer of the game's development and publishing efforts.

== History ==
The game was developed by a Ukrainian team called VK Team which later reorganized into Noble Empire, an American company, to gain access to global mobile markets. In the 2010s, the team worked on several games, but World of Guns: Gun Disassembly turned out to be the most successful.

== Gameplay ==
Gameplay screenshot of 'World of Guns', showing a Colt M1911 partially disassembled. Parts that are accompanied with a green arrow, in this case a screw, are able to be removed.

The player is presented with an interactive model of a real-world firearm (or other mechanism) in a 3D environment. Player has complete control of the camera, along with additional viewing options allowing them to explore the inner mechanical design of the piece. These include a multi-layered X-ray view, "trainer cutaway" mode and several slow-motion settings.

Depending on the game mode, the player is required to either learn the correct operation of the weapon, or perform its disassembly or assembly. Game modes are arranged in the order of increasing complexity, including field-stripping the weapon, complete disassembly of the mechanism, and finally disassembly and assembly against the clock and/or with penalties for incorrect moves. Every model has local and global leaderboards and a set of in-game achievements. The game includes interactive shooting ranges with timed objectives, as well as additional features like gun quizzes and a weapon skin editor.

World of Guns: Gun Disassembly is offered as a free-to-play title. To unlock the initially unavailable models, a player can either spend in-game credits earned through gameplay, or use microtransactions. Bulk DLC packs are available, including a lifetime access bundle which gives the user access to all current and future models in the library, however, for Ukrainian users, all weapon models are available for free.

== Models library ==
One of the game's principal features is a constantly expanding catalog of animated 3D models that dates back to 2010 (the date of the initial Gun Disassembly app's release). On average, developer Noble Empire has released one to two new models monthly. According to developers, 3D models are drawn and animated using actual weapons, original technical documentation and photographic sources. At this time, the World of Guns library consists of 234 models, with over 28,300 individual animated parts total. This includes historical and modern firearms, as well as several artillery pieces, motorcycles, automobiles (including Humvee and DeLorean), armored vehicles (BMP-3 and T-72) and a warbird (F4U Corsair). Another set of "bonus" models includes dinosaur and mammal skeletons.

== Reception ==
The game has received generally positive reviews. Rock, Paper, Shotgun praised World of Guns and its earlier iterations on multiple occasions, at one point comparing it favorably to Car Mechanic Simulator. RPS reviewers described the game as "disarmingly obsessive and up-front", "mesmerizing", "a pleasing almost ritualistic act", and noted that "[previously, we] called its gameplay "almost philosophical", which is partly a joke but I think very true".

Launch Party Gaming reviewer criticized the "pay-to-win" model used by the game, but praised it as a "must have for gun enthusiasts" and a "great simulator" (6.5/10). The review by firearms blog Guns.Com has pointed out that World of Guns is "a bit rough", but called its core functionality "outstanding" and a "unique resource", described the microtransactions model as "reasonable", and underlined its utility as reference for servicing actual firearms. The reviewer went on to say that "...when I buy a gun I usually check to see if WoG has a model of it, and if there is one, I’ll buy it". The game was also covered in Russian-language gaming press, including a segment on the Ot Vinta! TV show about video games.

The game has also received praise from law enforcement and military officials from numerous countries, as the game has provided help for maintaining weapons and assisting others in training. Teachers of various countries' educational military units have also thanked the developers. Footage from the game was also used for a US court case, with permission from the developers.
