= Road 96: Mile 0 =

2023 video game

- Cover art for Road 96: Mile 0
- Developer: DigixArt
- Publisher: Ravenscourt
- Producer: Kevin Bard
- Designers: Niels Enault; Tristan Hilare; Jean Manzoni; Virgile Nebulone
- Programmer: Julien Delaunay
- Writer: Ian Reiley
- Platforms: Nintendo Switch; PlayStation 4; PlayStation 5; Windows; Xbox One; Xbox Series X and Series S
- Release: April 4, 2023
- Genre: Adventure
- Mode: Single-player

Road 96: Mile 0 is a 2023 adventure video game developed by DigixArt and published by Ravenscourt. A prequel to Road 96 (2021) it is set two months before the original and follows Zoe, one of the original game's eight core non-playable characters, and Kaito, a character from Lost in Harmony, as they navigate their contrasting political views of the country's political and social conditions. Players switch control between Zoe and Kaito in first-person exploration and musical skating sequences, making dialogue choices that influence their characters' ideological beliefs and the circumstances of the ending.

Mile 0 was developed as a prequel to Road 96 due to fan interest in the characters and their lives before the events of the original game. DigixArt deliberately replaced the predecessor's procedural structure with a linear narrative centered on Zoe and Kaito. The game's story explores the development of political beliefs during adolescence, while its depiction of the contrasting social conditions of Petria was partly inspired by creative director Yoan Fanise's experiences living in Singapore. The musical sequences were influenced by games such as Sayonara Wild Hearts and were designed as metaphorical representations of the protagonists' emotions.

The game was released on April 4, 2023, for Nintendo Switch, PlayStation 4, PlayStation 5, Windows, Xbox One, and Xbox Series X and Series S. It received mixed reviews from critics, who generally praised its characters and musical sequences but criticized aspects of its writing, political commentary, and tonal consistency.

== Gameplay ==
Road 96: Mile 0 is an adventure game with a linear narrative, unlike its predecessor. Players switch control between friend protagonists Kaito and Zoe. Zoe returns from the original Road 96, in which she was a main character, and Kaito previously appeared in Lost in Harmony, DigixArt's first game. The game is divided between first-person exploration/conversation sections and musical skating sequences.

During exploration sequences, the player controls Kaito or Zoe from a first-person perspective as they navigate several areas of White Sands and interact with its inhabitants. The player's dialogue choices influence the protagonists' views of the world and move them along separate ideological spectrums. Players can also interact with the environment and complete various minigames between narrative sequences. The game features collectible cassette tapes containing songs from its soundtrack, as well as stickers and cans of spray paint that can be found while exploring White Sands and collectible progress can be carried over multiple playthroughs. Player choices affect the circumstances of the ending.

Major narrative events are presented through musical skating sequences. During these segments, Zoe and Kaito skate through surreal environments representing their dreams and emotions while following the rhythm of the accompanying music, both licensed and original. The player skates through each world, changing lanes and performing actions such as jumping or ducking to avoid obstacles while collecting counters. The environments and hazards are based on the events depicted in the preceding narrative sequence. Each combines rhythm-based gameplay with narrative choices, allowing the player's decisions to influence how the protagonists interpret their experiences. The game contains ten of these musical sequences, which can all be skipped.

== Plot ==
In May 1996, as a hurricane travels through Petria and is set to strike its only affluent area, White Sands, President Tyrak prepares to announce his candidacy for the country's upcoming election. In anticipation of the announcement, tensions begin rising between Petria's upper and lower-class communities. Zoe, the privileged daughter of the Minister of Oil, and her best friend Kaito, from the impoverished area of Tyrak Square, each have contrasting opinions on the country's political climate. Kaito harbors deep resentment toward Tyrak's regime as his former best friend, Aya, died after developing cancer caused by pollution from oil drilling in Colton City, an environmental disaster allegedly covered up to protect Tyrak's image. At the same time, Zoe carries trauma from witnessing a 1986 terrorist attack blamed on the Black Brigades, an anti-Tyrak group.

One day, Zoe overhears a conversation between Kaito and John about a deal between them. That evening, they meet, and Kaito tells her John is a Brigade and that the Brigades were framed for the 1986 disaster, and that Tyrak actually ordered to detonate the explosives. He adds that the Brigades have tasked his family with stealing a classified file from Tyrak's home that proves the cover-up. Zoe begins questioning her worldview and ultimately agrees to help him steal the file, as she is his neighbor. They plan to leave Petria together if the truth is confirmed.

Tyrak officially announces that he is running for the 1996 presidential election, and he promises to eliminate the Brigades as part of his campaign. Kaito is later assaulted as his home is raided by police. His family are placed under surveillance for suspicions of being in the Brigades. By tricking Tyrak's young son, Colton, Zoe and Kaito are able to infiltrate his mansion and successfully steal the file. After the break-in, Colton goes missing as the sandstorm begins to hit White Sands. The Brigades are blamed for the disappearance. Zoe is unable to reach Kaito and discovers that he already left Petria with his family, fearing that her joining would endanger the family as her high profile would expose them. A scorned Zoe packs to leave Petria and find Kaito. She escapes White Sands and tracks Kaito and his family to the Big Bear Rest Stop, where she sees John talking to a man through the window and hides inside a telephone booth.

Kaito's family arrive shortly thereafter. Kaito is instructed to find Robert in the rest stop and collect false identities to aid his family in crossing Petria's heavily guarded border. Once inside, Kaito meets Robert. While inside, Robert offers Kaito the opportunity to abandon his family's journey to the border and join the Brigades. Zoe steals the files from Kaito's parents' car before Kaito is sent to retrieve them. The two get into a physical altercation over the files, and regardless of who wins, Zoe leaves with them and continues her journey to the border.

The story's conclusion branches based on two player decisions: while hiding in the booth as Zoe, players are given the option to call the police and report the Brigade activity or not to, and during his meeting with Robert, Kaito can either accept his proposal to join the Brigades and receive a gun or reject and acquire the IDs. If Zoe calls the police and Kaito joins the Brigades, the police arrive shortly after she leaves, and Robert discovers the files are missing. Kaito attempts to help Robert escape by aiming the gun at the officers, and his parents are shot and killed in the ensuing confrontation before Robert escapes, and Kaito is arrested. If Zoe calls the police and Kaito rejects Robert, the police's arrival interrupts Robert's attempt to shoot Kaito. Robert and Kaito escape the scene separately, and Kaito watches helplessly as his parents get arrested. If Zoe doesn't call the police and Kaito joins the Brigades, Robert disables the family's vehicle, and Kaito departs with him as his parents are left unable to continue their journey. If Zoe doesn't report the Brigades and Kaito doesn't join them, Robert threatens to kill the family, but leaves alone. Kaito and his parents continue their journey to flee the country.

After the events of that night, Zoe reads the files and discovers that Kaito was telling the truth about the cover-up. She unsuccessfully attempts to contact him.

== Development and release ==
Road 96: Mile 0 was developed by DigixArt. The decision to develop a prequel was influenced by fan interest in the characters and the world of Road 96. According to creative director Yoan Fanise, players wanted to know more about where the characters in Road 96 came from and what their lives were like before leaving Petria. As Zoe was a popular character from the original, she was chosen as the prequel's focus. They chose to focus on the reasons why Zoe left her luxurious life. Fanise decided to introduce Kaito to the narrative of Road 96 and continue his story from Lost in Harmony after realizing his character's struggles with poverty would fit nicely into the lore of Petria and contrast with Zoe's privileged background.

The developers deliberately changed the gameplay structure from Road 96. Rather than replicating the original game's procedural format, Mile 0 was designed as a linear narrative centered on Zoe and Kaito. Fanise described this as an attempt to avoid repeating the first game's structure and to introduce new ways of presenting the narrative. Fanise said the game's underlying theme is the development of political beliefs during adolescence. The social and economic contrast between White Sands and the rest of Petria was partly inspired by Fanise's experience of living in Singapore, where he described affluent residential communities as creating an insulated environment separate from the poverty outside them. The 2019 South Korean film Parasite was named an influence for the game's story, through its tonal transition from lighthearted comedy to serious horror. Sayonara Wild Hearts was also cited as an influence for its animation style and implementation of music.

The musical segments were added into the game as a way of depicting Kaito and Zoe's emotional states. The game's soundtrack was chosen to fit the game's characters, mood and 1996 setting, and the scoring element of the musical segments were implemented to make the game more replayable. DigixArt experimented with placeholder tracks before selecting music from artists including The Midnight, Kalax, Arslan Elbar, Alexis Laugier, and The Offspring. The musical segments were then developed through an iterative process in which level designers and animators began with the music, then created paths with different speeds, turns, and obstacles timed to the music, and then connecting each sequence to its narrative meaning. The developers used the Rides to depict events metaphorically rather than realistically, with some major narrative choices occurring within the sequences themselves.

Mile 0 was released on April 4, 2023 for the Nintendo Switch, PlayStation 4, PlayStation 5, Windows PC, Xbox One, and Xbox Series X and Series S. It was published by DigixArt and Ravenscourt.

== Reception ==
Reception

Aggregate scores
Aggregator	Score
Metacritic	PC: 65/100; PS5: 70/100; XSX: 72/100
OpenCritic	27% recommended

Review scores
Publication	Score
Push Square	5/10
Shacknews	7/10

According to the review aggregator website Metacritic, Road 96: Mile 0 received "mixed or average reviews". OpenCritic reported that 27% of 53 critics recommended the game.

The story was called "compelling" by Shacknews writer Larryn Bell, who thought it provided enough context for the original game, but was predictable. Andrea Gonzalez of GameRant thought the story was engaging, if rushed and underwhelming, and liked that player choices had effect. Conversely, Giovanni Colatonio of Digital Trends thought the choices were shallow and had a limited impact. Several were critical of the game's tonal inconsistencies, with Christian Donlon of Eurogamer criticizing increasingly disorienting tonal shifts toward the game's conclusion, which he felt also made the characters' motivations and the significance of the player's choices difficult to understand.

Alice Bell of Rock Paper Shotgun praised the interactions between Zoe and Kaito and felt that the story effectively established their friendship, the differences between their backgrounds, and the underlying tension between them. Gonzalez of GameRant similarly found the characters enjoyable, but considered them underwritten. Colatonio criticized the game's attempts at political commentary, arguing that their attempts were "frustratingly vague" and "too careful to be meaningful," and thus, the game failed to convey a compelling perspective. Bell agreed, though argued that the original game also did not take a complicated approach on politics.

Mile 0's musical sequences received a positive response. (Note: Attributed to multiple references:) Donlon and Gonzalez each noted minor difficulties with controls during the segments, but overall found them to be immersive and exciting. Gonzalez enjoyed the visuals the sequences presented, and Bell (Rock Paper Shotgun) wrote that the sequences felt surreal, but appreciated that they did not take themselves too seriously. Colatonio thought they were enjoyable to play, but didn't contribute enough to the game's narrative. Gonzalez wrote positively of Mile 0's visuals, writing that it is "a game that is worth taking in the sights, even if it is to appreciate the specific vibe each district is attempting to go for." Shacknews writer Larryn Bell said that the game frequently crashed as it approached its conclusion.
