= Cooking Mama 4: Kitchen Magic =

2011 video game

- Developer: Cooking Mama Limited
- Publishers: NA: Majesco; PAL: 505 Games; JP: Office Create (Note: Retail copies distributed by Square Enix.)
- Composer: Masayoshi Ishi
- Series: Cooking Mama
- Platform: Nintendo 3DS
- Release: NA: November 16, 2011; AU: November 24, 2011; EU: November 25, 2011; JP: December 1, 2011
- Genres: Simulation, minigame
- Modes: Single-player, multiplayer

Cooking Mama 4: Kitchen Magic (Note: Cooking Mama 4 (クッキングママ4, Kukkingu Mama 4)) released as Cooking Mama 4 in Japan, Europe and Australia, is a 2011 video game for the Nintendo 3DS and it was the sequel to the Nintendo DS video game Cooking Mama 3: Shop & Chop and is the fourth installment to the Cooking Mama series. Kitchen Magic is the first Cooking Mama game to be released for the Nintendo 3DS and features 200 mini-games using the touch screen and 60 different recipes.

The successor to this game, Cooking Mama 5: Bon Appétit! for the Nintendo 3DS, was released on November 21, 2013.

== Development ==
The game was released in November 2011 in North America, Europe, Australia and December 1, 2011 in Japan. It was first announced in May 2011.

== Reception ==
Reception

Aggregate score
| Aggregator | Score |
|---|---|
| Metacritic | 56/100 |

Review scores
| Publication | Score |
|---|---|
| Famitsu | 30/40 |
| NGamer | 55% |
| Nintendo Power | 5/10 |
| Nintendo World Report | 5/10 |
| Official Nintendo Magazine | 70% |
| Common Sense Media | 3/5 |

Cooking Mama 4 received "mixed" reviews according to video game review aggregator website Metacritic. In Japan, Famitsu gave it a score of one eight, one seven, one eight, and one seven, for a total of 30 out of 40.
