= Dinner with Friends (disambiguation) =

Dinner with Friends is a 1998 play by Donald Margulies.

Dinner with Friends may also refer to:

- Dinner with Friends (2001 film), a 2001 film based on the 1998 play
- Cooking Mama 2: Dinner with Friends, a 2007 video game
- Dinner with Friends with Brett Gelman and Friends, a 2014 American television special
- Friendsgiving (film), a 2020 American comedy-drama also known as Dinner with Friends
- Dinner with Friends (2025 film), a Canadian film by Sasha Leigh Henry
