= Cooking Mama (video game) =

2006 video game

- Nintendo DS cover art
- Developer: Office Create
- Publishers: JP: Taito; NA: Majesco; PAL: 505 Games
- Composer: Masayoshi Ishi
- Series: Cooking Mama
- Platforms: Nintendo DS, iOS
- Release: Nintendo DS: JP: March 23, 2006; NA: September 12, 2006; AU: December 7, 2006; EU: December 8, 2006; iOS: WW: February 26, 2009
- Genres: Simulation, minigame
- Modes: Single-player, multiplayer

Cooking Mama (Note: Cooking Mama (クッキング ママ, Kukkingu Mama)) is a 2006 cookery simulation video game developed by Office Create for the Nintendo DS. It was later ported to iOS as Cooking Mama: Let's Cook! in 2009. It was published by Taito, Majesco, and 505 Games. It was awarded IGN's "Best Of E3" award for 2006. It is the start of the Cooking Mama series, with 4 more main series titles on DS and Nintendo 3DS, two spin offs on Wii, and a spin off on 3DS. It also spins off into the Gardening Mama series. For later titles in the series, the publishers and Office Create joined to form Cooking Mama Limited, which was made exclusively to develop the Cooking Mama series.

== Gameplay ==
Cooking Mama is a minigame compilation in which the player is tasked with cooking various meals using the device's touch screen. Following the instructions of the titular "Mama", the player uses the stylus or their finger to perform different kitchen tasks, including chopping vegetables, slicing meat, flipping food in pans, and arranging the final items on the plate. The version of the game for iOS also takes advantage of the accelerometer in its devices with some similar gameplay to Cooking Mama: Cook Off. Each of these tasks is performed by completing a mini-game which usually lasts less than 10 seconds. The gameplay structure consists of the player progressing through a series of short minigames. The game features a total of 96 different dishes.

Each minigame represents a different activity in the meal preparation, such as mixing, frying, or chopping the provided ingredients. The minigame mechanics themselves range from quickly drawing parallel lines in order to chop items, to a rhythm game where ingredients are added to a skillet or the heat is adjusted at precisely the right time. In many cases, players must look at the top screen of the DS for guidance on what to do next and then perform the task on the bottom screen. If the player makes a serious blunder or time expires without sufficient progress being made, that step in the cooking process is considered a failure. When this happens, a graphic of an angry "Mama" with flames erupting from her eyes is displayed, along with the caption "Don't worry, Mama will fix it!".

Completing a dish can require playing one minigame, or as many as a dozen. The player's performance is rated when each dish is finished, based on the average result of each minigame. Depending on the final score, the game may award the player a bronze, silver or gold medal. The highest medal earned for each dish is recorded and displayed next to each item on the selection screen.

A screenshot of the "Let's Cook" mode, where a player is cutting a tomato for a dish

== Game modes ==
=== Let's Cook ===
The main game mode where players cook dishes. Players initially start with just a few simple recipes to choose from, with additional recipes unlocked as the earlier ones are mastered. Each recipe requires players to play through a short, timed minigame for each ingredient or group of ingredients. For example, to make a sandwich, the player would first be required to chop a cucumber into slices before the time limit elapses.

When cooking a recipe which has previously been mastered, the player sometimes has the option to change the dish being made "on the fly" between two minigames. If completed, this new recipe is then unlocked for future play.

A player also has a choice to practice a recipe.

=== Let's Combine ===
In this mode, players can take the recipes which have been unlocked and combine them to make something new. For example, the "Fried Eggs" recipe can be combined with the "Rice" recipe to make an entree.

=== Use Skill ===
In this mode, players put their minigaming ingredients, peeling, stewing, tearing, and more to the test. The player is ranked at the end of each task.

== Reception ==
Reception

Aggregate scores
Aggregator	Score	
Aggregator	DS	iOS
GameRankings	68%	67%
Metacritic	67 of 100	N/A

Review scores
Publication	Score	
Publication	DS	iOS
Eurogamer	6 of 10	N/A
Famitsu	28 of 40	N/A
Game Informer	6.5 of 10	N/A
GamePro	4 of 5	N/A
GameSpot	6.9 of 10	N/A
GameSpy	3 of 5	N/A
IGN	7 of 10	7.3 of 10
Nintendo Power	7 of 10	N/A
Nintendo World Report	6.5 of 10	N/A
Detroit Free Press	3 of 4	N/A
The Sydney Morning Herald	3 of 5	N/A

The DS version received "mixed or average" reviews according to video game review aggregator website Metacritic. In Japan, Famitsu gave it a score of all four sevens, for a total of 28 out of 40.

411Mania gave it a score of 7.5 out of 10, saying that "At $19.99 this makes yet another quality and affordable title for the Nintendo DS library." Detroit Free Press also gave it a score of three stars out of four, calling it "a game best played in small bursts. It's perfect for waiting in line or during road trips." However, The Sydney Morning Herald gave it a score of three stars out of five and said it was "A lot of fun but unlikely to satisfy your gaming appetite."

The original Cooking Mama sold more than 500,000 copies in the United States as of August 15, 2007, and sold more than 1 million copies in PAL regions. It received a "Double Platinum" sales award from the Entertainment and Leisure Software Publishers Association (ELSPA), indicating sales of at least 600,000 copies in the United Kingdom.

As of January 30, 2008, the Cooking Mama series sold more than 2.6 million copies worldwide. Majesco also credited it, among other games, for an increase in revenue in early 2007. By May 2009, over four million copies of the series were sold in North America. Miley Cyrus was found to be a huge fan of the game, and even gained a large number of fans due to how much she enjoys it.

=== Criticism ===
The animal welfare group People for the Ethical Treatment of Animals (PETA) created a Flash game titled Cooking Mama: Mama Kills Animals intended to both criticize the video game's use of meat-based recipes and to encourage veganism. The creators of Cooking Mama responded to PETA in a press release stating that "I would never put rat in my ratatouille", and indicated that not all of Mama's recipes are meat-based. PETA stated that they were happy with the release of Gardening Mama, a spin-off of the series.

== See also ==
- Motoko-chan no Wonder Kitchen
