= Cooking Mama =

Japanese video game series

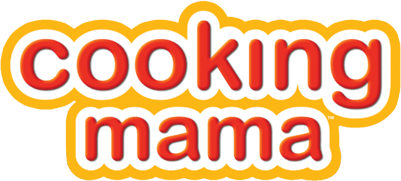
- Standard logo of the series
- Genres: Puzzle, Strategy, Cooking
- Developer: Cooking Mama Limited
- Publishers: JP: Taito (2006–2009); Square Enix (2011); Cooking Mama Ltd. (2010–present) NA/ZH: Majesco; PAL: 505 Games (2006–2011); Nintendo (2011–present) KR: Fujitsu (2007); Cooking Mama Ltd. (2012); Nintendo (2014–2015)
- Platforms: Nintendo Switch, Nintendo DS, Wii, Nintendo 3DS, iOS, Android, macOS, tvOS, iPadOS
- First release: Cooking Mama; March 23, 2006
- Latest release: Cooking Mama: Cuisine; June 17, 2022

Cooking Mama (Note: Cooking Mama (クッキング ママ, Kukkingu Mama)) (stylized as cookıng mama) is a video game series and media franchise owned by Cooking Mama Limited. The series is a cookery simulation-styled minigame compilation of many video games and adventures for Nintendo gaming platforms. Generally, the gameplay revolves around performing different kitchen tasks, through the instructions of "Mama", to cook various meals. The series so far consists of five main games on Nintendo DS and Nintendo 3DS, two spin-offs on Wii and Nintendo DS each, as well as a spin off on 3DS that is also a spin-off to the Gardening Mama series. The original Cooking Mama video game was also ported to iOS, iPadOS and Android as Cooking Mama: Let's Cook!. An unofficial sixth entry, Cooking Mama: Cookstar, was released by Planet Entertainment for the Nintendo Switch and PlayStation 4 in 2021, but the game was removed from sale in 2022 following a legal battle with Office Create.

== Gameplay ==
A screenshot from the first game in the series for the Nintendo DS, showcasing the player slicing an octopus leg for a dish

Gameplay involves the player following the instructions of the titular "Mama" to cook various meals. This is performed by using the device's controller, typically the touch screen, to perform various kitchen tasks such as chopping vegetables, slicing meat, flipping food in pans, and arranging the final items onto a plate. Each of these tasks is accomplished by completing a minigame which usually lasts less than 10 seconds. The series' gameplay structure consists of the player progressing through a series of short minigames.

Each minigame represents a different activity in the meal preparation, such as mixing, frying, or chopping the provided ingredients. The minigame mechanics themselves range from quickly drawing parallel lines in order to chop items, to a rhythm game where ingredients are added to a skillet or the heat is adjusted at precisely the right time. If the player makes a serious blunder or time expires without sufficient progress being made, that step in the cooking process is considered a failure. When this happens, a graphic of an angry "Mama" with flames erupting from her eyes is displayed, along with the caption "Don't worry, Mama will fix it!".

Completing a dish can require playing one minigame, or as many as a dozen. The player's performance is rated when each dish is finished, based on the average result of each minigame. Depending on the final score, the game may award the player a bronze, silver or gold medal. The highest medal earned for each dish is recorded and displayed next to each item on the selection screen.

== Games ==
Release timeline Main series in bold
2006	**Cooking Mama**
2007	Cooking Mama: Cook Off
2007	**Cooking Mama 2: Dinner with Friends**
2008	Cooking Mama: World Kitchen
2009	Gardening Mama
2009	**Cooking Mama 3: Shop & Chop**
2010	Crafting Mama
2010	Babysitting Mama
2011	Camping Mama: Outdoor Adventures
2011	**Cooking Mama 4: Kitchen Magic**
2012
2013	Gardening Mama 2: Forest Friends
2013	**Cooking Mama 5: Bon Appétit!**
2014
2015	Cooking Mama: Let’s Cook
2016	Cooking Mama: Let’s Cook Puzzle
2017	Cooking Mama: Sweet Shop
2018
2019
2020	Cooking Mama: Cookstar
2021
2022	Cooking Mama: Cuisine!

=== Cooking Mama (2006) ===
Cooking Mama is the first game in the franchise. It was first released for the Nintendo DS in March 2006, and it was later ported to iOS, iPadOS, and Android as Cooking Mama: Let’s Cook! in 2015.

=== Cooking Mama: Cook Off (2007) ===
Cooking Mama: Cook Off, a spin off made for Wii, was released for the Wii in Japan on February 8, 2007, replacing the original's touchscreen control with use of the Wii Remote to guide the cooking activities. It was later released in North America on March 20, 2007, and on May 11, 2007, in Europe.

=== Cooking Mama 2: Dinner with Friends (2007) ===
Cooking Mama 2: Dinner with Friends, the second Nintendo DS game in the series, was first released in November 2007. Along with new recipes, this title expands the total number of different minigames and adds several new gameplay modes.

=== Cooking Mama: World Kitchen (2008) ===
Cooking Mama: World Kitchen for the Wii was released on November 18, 2008, and was the second Wii spin off title.

=== Gardening Mama (2009) ===
Gardening Mama is a spin-off released for Nintendo DS on March 19, 2009, that focuses on fruits and vegetables.

=== Cooking Mama 3: Shop & Chop (2009) ===
Cooking Mama 3: Shop & Chop, the third Nintendo DS game in the series, had a hands-on demo available at E3 2009, and was first released in October 2009.

=== Crafting Mama (2010) ===
Crafting Mama is a spin off released for Nintendo DS on October 26, 2010, that focuses on crafting.

Babysitting Mama logo

=== Babysitting Mama (2010) ===
Babysitting Mama is a spin off released for Nintendo Wii on November 5, 2010, that focuses on babysitting.

=== Camping Mama: Outdoor Adventures (2011) ===
Camping Mama: Outdoor Adventures, commonly known as just Camping Mama, is a spin off released for Nintendo DS in 2011 that focuses on camping.

=== Cooking Mama 4: Kitchen Magic (2011) ===
Cooking Mama 4: Kitchen Magic, the fourth main entry in the series and the first entry to be published on the Nintendo 3DS, was first released in November 2011.

=== Gardening Mama 2: Forest Friends (2013) ===
Gardening Mama 2: Forest Friends released for Nintendo 3DS on September 26, 2013, and is a sequel to the spin off title Gardening Mama.

=== Cooking Mama 5: Bon Appétit! (2013) ===
Cooking Mama 5: Bon Appétit!, the fifth main entry in the series and the second entry to be published on the Nintendo 3DS, was first released in November 2013.

=== Cooking Mama: Sweet Shop (2017) ===
Cooking Mama: Sweet Shop is a spin off title released for Nintendo 3DS on May 18, 2017. The game focuses on baking sweet treats and managing a sweet shop to attract and satisfy customers.

=== Cooking Mama: Cookstar (2020) ===
Cooking Mama: Cookstar is an unofficial installment in the Cooking Mama series published by Planet Entertainment. The game was briefly released on the Nintendo Switch eShop on March 31, 2020, but was taken down just a few hours later due to legal issues between Planet Entertainment and the owner of the Cooking Mama IP, Office Create. The fact that the game released without a public announcement or press statement and was taken down so quickly led to speculation about the game's development and if the game will ever be properly released. A PlayStation 4 version was also announced with the game's initial announcement in August 2019, which was released on March 25, 2021, by Planet Entertainment, but was cancelled right after. This was the first Cooking Mama game released on a platform to receive a third-party console release. In November 2022, an arbitration ruling declared Planet Entertainment was not authorized to release Cooking Mama: Cookstar, and that the rightsholders would work to remove the game from sale.

=== Cooking Mama: Cuisine! (2022) ===
Cooking Mama: Cuisine! was developed and published by Office Create and released for Apple Arcade on July 17, 2022. Ingredients and utensils change daily so new recipes are possible each day. There are over 40 recipes documented in the in-game recipe list, with some players reporting over 100 possible dish outcomes.

== Reception ==
As of 2011, the series has sold over 12 million copies worldwide.

Aggregate review scores
Game	Metacritic	GameRankings
Cooking Mama	67/100	68%
Cook Off	61/100	63%
Dinner with Friends	70/100	71%
World Kitchen	62/100	68%
Shop & Chop	65/100	68%
Kitchen Magic	56/100	62%
Bon Appétit!	60/100	64%
Sweet Shop	56/100	62%
Cookstar	46/100	—
