= Cooking Mama: World Kitchen =

2008 video game

- North American Wii cover art
- Developer: Cooking Mama Limited
- Publishers: JP: Taito; NA: Majesco; PAL: 505 Games
- Series: Cooking Mama
- Platform: Wii
- Release: NA: November 18, 2008; JP: December 11, 2008; EU: February 6, 2009; AU: June 4, 2009
- Genres: Simulation, minigame
- Modes: Single-player, multiplayer

Cooking Mama: World Kitchen (Note: クッキングママ２ たいへん!!ママはおおいそがし! (Kukkingu Mama 2: Taihen! Mama wa Ooisogashi!)) is the second spin off game in the Cooking Mama franchise and the sequel to the 2007 Wii game Cooking Mama: Cook Off. The game was developed by Cooking Mama Limited. It was published by Taito in Japan, Majesco in North America, and by 505 Games in PAL regions. The game was released exclusively on Wii in North America on November 18, 2008, in Japan on December 11, 2008, in Europe on February 6, 2009, and in Australia on June 4, 2009.

== Gameplay ==
The goal of the game is to complete a meal of the player's choice. The player cooks in steps, for example, if making sushi, the player will cut the fish in one step, and do the rice in another. Every time a meal is finished, other meals are unlocked, and so are other characters, family and friends.

== Reception ==
Reception

Aggregate score
Aggregator	Score
Metacritic	62/100

Review scores
Publication	Score
1Up.com	C−
Famitsu	29/40
Game Informer	5.5/10
GameRevolution	C+
GamesMaster	64%
GameZone	7.1/10
IGN	7/10
NGamer	39%
Nintendo Power	6.5/10
Official Nintendo Magazine	64%

The game received "mixed or average" reviews according to video game review aggregator website Metacritic. In Japan, Famitsu gave it a score of two eights, one seven, and one six, for a total of 29 out of 40.
