= Cooking Mama 5: Bon Appétit! =

2013 video game

- North American pre-release box art
- Developer: Cooking Mama Limited
- Publishers: NA: Majesco; JP: Office Create; PAL: Nintendo
- Series: Cooking Mama
- Platform: Nintendo 3DS
- Release: JP: November 21, 2013; NA: September 16, 2014; EU: March 6, 2015
- Genre: Simulation
- Modes: Single-player, multiplayer

Cooking Mama 5: Bon Appétit!, (Note: Cooking Mama 5 (クッキングママ5, Kukkingu Mama 5)) released in Japan as Cooking Mama 5 and in Europe and Australia as Cooking Mama: Bon Appétit!, is the sequel to the Nintendo 3DS video game Cooking Mama 4: Kitchen Magic and is the fifth installment to the Cooking Mama series, the second on the Nintendo 3DS. It was released in Japan on November 21, 2013. It was then released in North America on September 16, 2014, and in Europe on March 6, 2015. It contains over 60 recipes and new household activities/games.

== Gameplay ==
Similar to other Cooking Mama games, the player cooks various meals using the 3DS's touch screen. Following the instructions of the titular "Mama", the player uses the stylus or their finger to perform different kitchen tasks, including chopping vegetables, slicing meat, flipping food in pans, and arranging the final items on the plate. Each of these tasks is performed by completing a mini-game, which usually lasts less than 10 seconds. The gameplay structure consists of the player progressing through a series of short minigames. At the end of each minigame, players are given a score, and at the end of the dish, they are given a final score based on their performance over the entire dish. The game features a total of 60 different dishes and 30 non-cooking-related minigames.

Cooking Mama 5 also features local multiplayer via Download Play, allowing players to compete against each other in 15 different cooking tasks taken from the main game.

== Game modes ==
=== Let's Cook ===
The main game mode where players cook dishes. Players initially start with just a few simple recipes to choose from, with additional recipes unlocked as the earlier ones are mastered. Each recipe requires players to play through a short, timed minigame for each ingredient or group of ingredients. For example, to make a sandwich, the player would first be required to chop a cucumber into slices before the time limit elapses.

Successfully completing a recipe in Let's Cook unlocks the recipe in the Cooking Dojo.

=== Cooking Dojo ===
This main game mode provides players with a greater challenge by allowing them to replay completed recipes with stricter time limits. In this mode, players are able to earn Bronze, Silver, or Gold medals based on their time to completion and mistakes made. Too many mistakes will result in a failed dish, although you are given the option to replay each stage, whether or not you have failed. All recipes are available for this mode, with the exception of Parfait and Mama Lunch Box. Each recipe consists of at most 6 steps, each of which can be done as many times as the player desires before moving on to the next step.

=== Let's Help in the Shop! ===
This game mode features players helping Mama run the restaurant. Players do this in two main ways: acting as a waiter, arranging dishes on a tray, and earning points by matching the correct layout, or by running the cash register and giving customers correct amounts of change using 1, 10, 50, and 100 value coins.

=== Let's Help Harvest! ===
This game mode focuses on players collecting ingredients for recipes by catching falling food in a truck or using scissors to cut fruit from a tree as the scene scrolls by. This mode also features sorting puzzles.

=== Let's Help Mama ===
This game mode follows players as they assist Mama with a variety of household chores, all implemented in a minigame format.

=== Let's Study ===
This game mode provides players with simple math and word-based games. These games involve timed challenges revolving around several different mechanics. These range from sliding puzzles to word matching. Points are rewarded based on the number of moves made and the time to complete the solution.

== Development ==
The game was leaked on July 4, 2013, ahead of its official announcement on July 28. The game was released in Japan on November 21, 2013. It was then released in North America on September 16, 2014. It was released in Europe on March 6, 2015.

== Setting ==
Cooking Mama 5: Bon Appétit! takes place primarily in the kitchen of Mama's shop. Throughout the game, the player will visit different locations in the shop, including the foyer, the kitchen, the backyard, the garden, the playroom of Mama's presumed child, and the patio. The player will also visit the beach during a minigame.

== Reception ==
Reception

Aggregate score
Aggregator	Score
Metacritic	60/100

Review scores
Publication	Score
Famitsu	32/40
GameTrailers	4.5/10
IGN	7/10
Nintendo Life	7/10

Cooking Mama 5: Bon Appétit! received mixed reviews from users and critics, often noting a lack of progression and coherence between dishes, and repetition of the Cooking Mama formula without any increase in difficulty or innovation of the core mechanics. The game was praised for its accessibility to younger players and inclusion of Dojo Mode giving players the option to increase the pace of the game.
