= DigixArt =

French video game developer

DigixArt Entertainment SAS
- Type: Subsidiary
- Industry: Video games
- Founded: April 10, 2015; 11 years ago
- Founders: Yoan Fanise; Anne-Laure Fanise
- Headquarters: Montpellier, France
- Key people: Yoan Fanise (creative director); Anne-Laure Fanise (producer)
- Products: 11-11: Memories Retold, Road 96
- Number of employees: 20 (2022)
- Parent: Plaion (2021–2025); THQ Nordic (2025-present)
- Website: digixart.com

DigixArt Entertainment SAS is a video game development company based in Montpellier, France. Founded in 2015 by Yoan Fanise, the director of Valiant Hearts: The Great War, the company is most known for developing 11-11: Memories Retold and Road 96.

== History ==
The studio was founded in April 2015 by Yoan Fanise, who previously worked at Ubisoft Montpellier for 14 years. Following the success of his previous project, Valiant Hearts: The Great War, which secured multiple wins at the British Academy Games Awards, Fanise decided to establish his own company to develop independent games. The studio was named after "tenth art", the name of an award that Fanise and his team won for their work on Valiant Hearts. The studio had a total of 6 people alongside some contractors when it was established. Fanise's goal was to create meaningful games at a pace that faster than he could achieve at a triple-A studios.

The studio took nine months to develop their debut title, which is a rhythm game named Lost in Harmony. The game is a collaboration with singer Wyclef Jean. Fanise had previously worked on Just Dance, and decided that the team would use Lost in Harmony to introduce players to the history of Classical music. The game received generally positive reviews upon release. DigixArt's next project was a collaboration with Aardman Animation called 11-11: Memories Retold. Like Valiant Hearts, 11-11 is a narrative adventure video game set in World War I. Development of the game took 18 months, and the game was released by publisher Bandai Namco Entertainment in November 2018, two days before the centennial of the armistice. The company's next game was Road 96. The game's premiere at The Game Awards attracted publishers who wanted to acquire the company. While the studio was originally in talks with Koch Media to publish Road 96, the parent company of the German publisher, Embracer Group, fully acquired DigixArt, alongside seven other studios for $300 million in August 2021.

== Games ==
Year	Title	Platform(s)
2016	Lost in Harmony	Windows, iOS, Nintendo Switch
2018	11-11: Memories Retold	Windows, PlayStation 4, Xbox One
2021	Road 96	Windows, Nintendo Switch, PlayStation 4, PlayStation 5, Xbox One, Xbox Series X/S
2023	Road 96: Mile 0	Windows, Nintendo Switch, PlayStation 4, PlayStation 5, Xbox One, Xbox Series X/S
2026	Tides of Tomorrow	Windows, PlayStation 5, Xbox Series X/S
TBA	Untitled Road 96 Project	TBA
