= 11-11: Memories Retold =

2018 video game

- Developers: DigixArt; Aardman Animations
- Publisher: Bandai Namco Entertainment
- Director: Yoan Fanise
- Producer: George Rowe
- Designer: François Rizzo
- Artist: Codey Dyer
- Writers: Iain Sharkey; Stephen Long
- Composer: Olivier Deriviere
- Engine: Unity
- Platforms: Microsoft Windows; PlayStation 4; Xbox One
- Release: 9 November 2018
- Genre: Adventure
- Mode: Single-player

11-11 Memories Retold is an adventure video game set during World War I. It was released on 9 November 2018, two days before the centennial of the armistice. It is co-developed by DigixArt and Aardman Animations, and published by Bandai Namco Entertainment.

One of the game's main features is its visual style, inspired by impressionist art.

== Synopsis ==
The game allows the player to play as two characters during World War I: Canadian photographer Harry Lambert (Elijah Wood) and German engineer Kurt Waldner (Sebastian Koch). Both engage in the war for different reasons. Harry is attracted by the glory and the desire to seduce his childhood friend, so he decides to follow a major in search of a new war photographer. Kurt, working as an engineer, learns on the radio that his son's unit is missing and decides to join the German military to find him.

== Gameplay ==
11-11 Memories Retold takes place from a third-person perspective with the ability to choose between the two protagonists either at the beginning of the chapter, or freely in the middle during certain parts. Each character advances in the story with his own tools:

- Kurt has the ability to interact with different electrical devices, which make up some of the game's puzzles.
- Harry has a camera, which he can use to photograph different points of interest by showing the war in his best light for his superiors, or for himself.

The game allows the player to control a cat and a pigeon during certain sequences.

== Development ==
The game started development when DigixArt met people from Aardman at Games for Change Europe 2016. The developers said that they wanted to convey moments of humanity between the two sides. The art style for the game was based on a short film that Aardman created for the Imperial War Museum called Flight of the Stories. The short used 3D objects with a stylized impressionist style. Aardman said that they also tried styles that were influenced by WWI, such as Futurism and Cubism, but Aardman did not want a game that seemed low-poly, so they switched to an impressionist style. J. M. W. Turner, Claude Monet, and Aleksandr Petrov were the artists that Aardman credited with inspiring the game's style.

== Reception ==
Reception

Aggregate scores
Aggregator	Score
Metacritic	PC: 73/100; PS4: 77/100; XONE: 77/100
OpenCritic	58% recommend

Review scores
Publication	Score
Edge	7/10
GameSpot	7/10
Jeuxvideo.com	18/20

11-11: Memories Retold received "generally favourable reviews" for PlayStation 4 and Xbox One, and "mixed or average reviews" for Windows on Metacritic. Fellow review aggregator OpenCritic assessed that the game received strong approval, being recommended by 58% of critics. Critics praised the writing and voicing of the characters.

== See also ==
- Valiant Hearts: The Great War, a video game by the same director commemorating the centennial of the war's beginning
