= Crafting Mama =

2010 video game

- Developer: Cooking Mama Limited
- Publishers: JP: Office Create; NA: Majesco; PAL: 505 Games
- Composer: Sara Sakurai
- Series: Cooking Mama
- Platform: Nintendo DS
- Release: NA: October 26, 2010; AU: November 11, 2010; JP: November 11, 2010; EU: November 12, 2010
- Genres: Simulation, minigame
- Modes: Single-player, multiplayer

Crafting Mama, known in Japan as Craft Mama (クラフトママ Kurafuto Mama) and in the PAL region as Cooking Mama World: Hobbies and Fun, is a crafting simulation-styled minigame compilation video game developed by Cooking Mama Limited that was released on Nintendo DS during October 2010. It is a spin-off from the Cooking Mama series.

== Gameplay ==
Crafting Mama is a mini-game collection themed around handicrafts. The player selects an object to craft, such as earrings or paper planes, and plays various mini-games representing the process of creating it. The objects crafted by the player can then be further customized or used for additional mini-games.

== Reception ==
Reception

Aggregate score
Aggregator	Score
Metacritic	75/100

Review scores
Publication	Score
Famitsu	29/40
IGN	8/10
Nintendo Power	7/10
Common Sense Media	4/5

The game received "favorable" reviews according to video game review aggregator website Metacritic. In Japan, Famitsu gave it a score of two eights, one six, and one seven, for a total of 29 out of 40. One of its editors wrote,

It's a simple game with no story aspect to it, but this no-frills approach makes it easy to lose yourself in the gameplay. You do have arrows pointing out what to do, but otherwise there isn't a ton of guidance, which really makes it feel like you're crafting something original.

Others, however, disagreed, saying,

It's a little weird to get penalized for failing to do things that have nothing to do with actual craftwork, like tapping the screen at the right moment. Some of the minigames are too hard to follow, and it seems like you're judged too harshly on them as well.
