= Car Mechanic Simulator 2014 =

2014 simulation video game

- Developer: Red Dot Games
- Publisher: PlayWay S.A.
- Series: Car Mechanic Simulator
- Engine: Unity
- Platforms: Windows, macOS, iOS, Android
- Release: 24 January 2014
- Genre: Simulation
- Mode: Single-player

Car Mechanic Simulator 2014 is a simulation video game depicting the work of an automotive mechanic. It was released in January 2014 on for Windows and macOS, and for iOS and Android. The game has three sequels, Car Mechanic Simulator 2015, Car Mechanic Simulator 2018 and Car Mechanic Simulator 2021.

== Gameplay ==
The game is played from a first-person perspective, with the player able to walk freely around the shop. Instead of levels, the game is divided into "jobs" - customer vehicles with a list of problems — which the player must troubleshoot and repair. Upon receiving a job and a vehicle, the player is required to remove, inspect, and replace the relevant broken parts. When a vehicle is reassembled, it may be taken for a test drive before being returned to the customer.

== Reception ==
Car Mechanic Simulator 2014 received average reviews from critics, with a mixed reception according to Metacritic.

Reception

Aggregate score
Aggregator	Score
Metacritic	PC: 61/100

== Extensions ==
Game offers two extensions with packs of additional cars to repair:

- 4X4 Expansion Pack provides 20 new F2P work orders for various repairs of 4X4 off-road vehicles and is available at no cost to owners of the baseline Steam-enabled release. The primary 4X4 car is a separate body frame with rigid, live front and rear axles. It presents unique new maintenance challenges far different from those in the base version of Car Mechanic Simulator 2014. Once installed, new parts appear in the garage shop including front and rear axles, drive shafts, special off-road shock absorbers and a rear muffler. The new vehicle is also available in endless mode.
- 1/4 Mile Expansion Pack comes with new test track, where the users can check the performance of tuned cars.
