= Kona (video game) =

2017 adventure video game

- Developer: Parabole
- Publisher: Parabole (Win); Deep Silver (PS4, PCVR); Ravenscourt (NS, XONE, Stadia, PSVR): EU: Koch Media (NS)
- Engine: Unity 5 (former); Unity 6
- Platforms: Linux, macOS, Windows, PlayStation 4, Xbox One, Nintendo Switch, Shield TV, Stadia, PlayStation 5
- Release: Linux, macOS, Windows, PS4, Xbox One; March 17, 2017; Switch, Shield TV; March 9, 2018; Stadia; August 1, 2020; PS5, Xbox Series X/S; December 7, 2021
- Genre: Adventure
- Mode: Single-player

Kona is a 2017 adventure video game developed by the Canadian studio Parabole and published by Ravenscourt. Set in October 1970, the game centers on Carl Faubert, a private investigator, who arrives at a snowy town in Nord-du-Québec, only to find the place deserted with something that is lurking around. A sequel, Kona II: Brume, was released in 2023.

== Gameplay ==
Kona includes survival and supernatural elements with buildings to explore, which contain loot (tools, light) and can serve as shelters. The threats include cold (solved by setting up fire) and wolves (which can be shot or distracted with raw meat). There is a stress level, which increases by seeing upsetting scenes, dealing with tough situations, or having accidents. A higher stress level will decrease the sprint speed and add a shakier aim, but Carl can calm himself by smoking cigarettes and drinking beers that are spread around.

The navigation of the region is done by Carl's truck in a first-person viewpoint. While driving, Carl can hold the zoomable map in his right hand in case something needs to be checked. The game has Carl's thoughts being narrated as he goes through clues to find out what has happened to the town, along with puzzles that support the story.

== Development ==
Kona was developed by the Canadian-based company Parabole. Initial funding for the game came through a crowdfunding campaign on the Kickstarter website. The campaign was launched on August 7, 2014, with a goal of CA$40,000; it ended on September 6, 2014, with CA$44,271 raised by 1,304 people. The lead developer, Alexandre Fiset, later said that the funding from Kickstarter would have produced a five-minute game. Later funding for the game came from the Canada Media Fund, which accounted for roughly half. It was released on Steam Early Access in March 2016, and fully released a year later. The game was ported to virtual reality on June 19, 2018 for the PlayStation VR, Oculus Rift, and HTC Vive platforms, with support for motion controls.

== Reception ==
Reception

Aggregate score
Aggregator	Score
Metacritic	73/100 (PC); 71/100 (PS4); 63/100 (Switch)

Review scores
Publication	Score
Destructoid	8.5/10
Nintendo Life	7/10
Nintendo World Report	7/10
Digitally Downloaded	3.5/5

On its release, Kona was met with "mixed or average" reviews from critics on Metacritic, with an aggregate score of 73% for Microsoft Windows, 71% for PlayStation 4 and 63% for Nintendo Switch.
