= Car Mechanic Simulator 2021 =

2021 video game

- Developer: Red Dot Games
- Publisher: PlayWay S.A.
- Series: Car Mechanic Simulator
- Engine: Unity
- Platforms: Microsoft Windows; Xbox One; Xbox Series X/S; PlayStation 4; PlayStation 5
- Release: August 11, 2021: Microsoft Windows; WW: August 11, 2021 PlayStation 4, Xbox One, Xbox Series X/S; WW: August 12, 2021 PlayStation 5; WW: May 2, 2022
- Genre: Vehicle simulation
- Mode: Single-player

Car Mechanic Simulator 2021 is a simulation video game developed by Polish studio Red Dot Games and published by PlayWay. The game simulates the work of an automotive mechanic, allowing players to operate a car repair workshop, diagnose mechanical problems, repair and restore vehicles, and expand their business. It was released for Microsoft Windows on August 11, 2021, and for PlayStation 4, Xbox One and Xbox Series X/S on August 12, 2021. Version for PlayStation 5 was released on May 2, 2022. It is the fourth main instalment in the Car Mechanic Simulator series and the successor to Car Mechanic Simulator 2018.

== Gameplay ==
The game is played from a first-person perspective, allowing players to move freely around their workshop and interact with vehicles, tools and equipment. The main gameplay revolves around accepting customer orders, diagnosing mechanical problems and repairing vehicles. Jobs involve inspecting vehicle components, identifying damaged parts and performing maintenance, including replacing components, changing engine oil and other service fluids, and repairing engines, suspension systems and chassis components.

Players can purchase replacement parts or refurbish damaged components using specialized workshop equipment. Vehicle repairs often require the disassembly and reassembly of individual components to access damaged parts. The game features a range of automotive tools and equipment, including a tire balancer, spring compressor, engine stand and brake lathe. Minigames are also incorporated into certain repair and component-refurbishment activities.

Completing jobs rewards players with credits and experience points, which can be used to purchase equipment, unlock additional workshop facilities and expand the garage. Available facilities include a test track, paint shop and car wash. Players can also acquire vehicles through auctions, salvage auctions, barn finds and junkyard searches. These vehicles can be repaired, restored, mechanically tuned and visually customized before being kept or sold.

== Downloadable content ==
A variety of downloadable content is available for Car Mechanic Simulator 2021, most of which expands the selection of vehicles available in the game. Several DLC packs introduce officially licensed replicas of real-world automobiles from manufacturers such as Nissan, Porsche, Jaguar, Land Rover, Pagani, Aston Martin, BMW, and Mercedes-Benz. Other vehicle packs introduce additional cars from manufacturers featured in previous instalments, including Ford, Dodge, Plymouth, Chrysler, Jeep, and RAM. These vehicles are integrated into the existing game and can be repaired, modified, painted, and restored in the player's garage.

In addition to the manufacturer-specific expansions, several DLC packs introduce new vehicle categories and customization options. The Electric Car DLC adds electric vehicles, while the Hot Rod DLC introduces a selection of custom hot rods. The Drag Racing DLC expands the gameplay with drag racing-related content, allowing players to test the performance of their rebuilt vehicles. Other expansions, such as the Rims and Rims 2 DLCs, add additional wheel designs and customization options. Later releases also include themed vehicle collections, such as the Taxi and Police DLCs, which introduce vehicles inspired by real-world taxis and police cars. The Pickup DLC further expands the selection with a collection of pickup trucks.

| Name | Release date | Content |
|---|---|---|
| Nissan | August 11, 2021 | Adds four vehicles: Nissan 240Z, Nissan Silvia S13, Nissan GT-R and Nissan 370Z. |
| Electric Car | August 11, 2021 | Adds four electric vehicles, introducing electric-powered cars to the game. |
| Jaguar | October 20, 2021 | Adds four vehicles: Jaguar E-Type, XJS, XJ220 and F-Type R. |
| Porsche Remastered | November 11, 2021 | Adds four vehicles: Porsche 911 Turbo S, 911 RS America, 911 Carrera S and Carrera GT. |
| Pagani Remastered | November 22, 2021 | Adds three vehicles, including the Pagani Zonda Revolución and Huayra. |
| Land Rover | February 3, 2022 | Adds four vehicles from the Land Rover and Range Rover model ranges. |
| Hot Rod Remastered | April 11, 2022 | Adds five hot rods inspired by classic American custom cars. |
| Lotus Remastered | May 5, 2022 | Adds the Lotus Esprit S1 and Lotus Elise S1. |
| Mazda Remastered | July 26, 2022 | Adds the Mazda RX-3 and Mazda RX-7. |
| Aston Martin | September 19, 2022 | Adds four vehicles, including the Aston Martin DB5, DBS, Vantage and DBX. |
| Drag Racing | November 9, 2022 | Introduces drag racing, allowing players to compete and test the performance of their vehicles. |
| Mercedes-Benz Remastered | January 26, 2023 | Adds five vehicles, including the Mercedes-Benz 300 SL Gullwing, 560 SEC, 500E, SLS AMG and 280 SL Pagoda. |
| Ford Remastered | March 24, 2023 | Adds four vehicles, including the Ford GT40, Mustang Mach 1, F-350 Super Duty and Mustang. |
| Dodge, Plymouth & Chrysler Remastered | June 29, 2023 | Adds eight vehicles from Dodge, Plymouth and Chrysler. |
| China | September 12, 2023 | Adds a collection of vehicles from Chinese automobile manufacturers. |
| BMW | November 21, 2023 | Adds five vehicles, including the BMW 2002 Turbo, M1 Procar, 635 CSi, M3 and M4 GTS. |
| Rims | January 8, 2024 | Adds 80 new wheel designs with various colour options. |
| Jeep & RAM Remastered | May 6, 2024 | Adds six vehicles from Jeep and RAM, including the Wrangler, Grand Cherokee SRT8 and RAM pickup trucks. |
| Taxi | January 17, 2025 | Adds taxi vehicles inspired by real-world models, along with taxi-specific customization options. |
| Police | July 28, 2025 | Adds six police vehicles featuring police liveries and equipment. |
| Rims 2 | February 3, 2026 | Adds 120 additional wheel designs. |
| Pickup | July 7, 2026 | Adds six pickup trucks. |

== Commercial performance ==
Car Mechanic Simulator 2021 achieved a commercially successful launch following its release in August 2021. According to its publisher, PlayWay, the game's development, marketing, localization, testing and console-porting costs did not exceed PLN 2.7 million. The company reported that these costs were recouped within the first 24 hours of sales on Steam. In its post-launch sales report, PlayWay announced that the game had sold approximately 132,000 copies on PC and 11,000 copies on Xbox. By 25 September 2021, PC sales had reached approximately 320,000 copies, according to the company's financial report. The publisher has not disclosed the game's total lifetime sales or cumulative revenue across all platforms.

== Sequel ==
A successor, titled Car Mechanic Simulator 2027, is in development by Red Dot Games and will be published by PlayWay. Originally announced as Car Mechanic Simulator 2026, the game was renamed in October 2026 after its development took longer than anticipated. The upcoming instalment introduces online cooperative multiplayer, allowing two players to work together in a repair workshop. Its release is planned for the first quarter of 2027 for Microsoft Windows, PlayStation and Xbox platforms.
