= Valiant Hearts: The Great War =

2014 puzzle-adventure game

- Developer: Ubisoft Montpellier
- Publisher: Ubisoft
- Directors: Yoan Fanise; Paul Tumelaire
- Producer: Bruno Galet
- Designers: Julien Chevallier; Simon Chocquet-Bottani
- Programmer: Stéphane Fricard
- Artist: Paul Tumelaire
- Writers: Gabrielle Shrager; Matt Entin; Ed Kuehnel; Gerard Barnaud
- Composer: Jason Moran
- Engine: UbiArt Framework
- Platforms: PlayStation 3 PlayStation 4 Microsoft Windows; Xbox 360; Xbox One iOS; Android; Nintendo Switch; Stadia
- Release: 25 June 2014: PS3, PS4, Windows, Xbox 360, Xbox One 25 June 2014 iOS 4 September 2014 Android 26 November 2014 Nintendo Switch 8 November 2018 Stadia 14 July 2022
- Genres: Puzzle, adventure
- Mode: Single-player

Valiant Hearts: The Great War (Note: French: Soldats inconnus: Mémoires de la Grande Guerre (lit. Unknown Soldiers: Memories of the Great War)) is a 2014 puzzle adventure game developed by Ubisoft Montpellier and published by Ubisoft. The game was released for Microsoft Windows, PlayStation 3, PlayStation 4, Xbox 360, and Xbox One in June 2014. Set during World War I, the game follows four characters who help a young German soldier find his love in a story about survival, sacrifice, and friendship. Players solve puzzles by interacting with various objects and people. The characters are accompanied by a dog named Walt who helps players solve puzzles. Collectible items hidden in each chapter reveal facts about the war.

The development team's goal was to assist players to remember World War I during its centenary in 2014. The team stayed away from creating a war game or a first-person shooter and focused instead on depicting the trials and tribulations of soldiers on both sides during the war. To ensure the game was historically accurate, the team listened to first-hand accounts of the war, read letters written by enlisted soldiers and traveled to the remains of wartime trenches in France. As the team had no experience working on a puzzle game, they took inspiration from old LucasArts adventure games as well as titles like The Cave. Valiant Hearts utilises UbiArt Framework which was previously used in Rayman Legends.

Upon release, The Great War received generally positive reviews. Critics praised the game's themes, visuals, animation, and music, and applauded the developer for enabling players to learn more about history while playing the game. However, reception to the game's story and gameplay was mixed. Valiant Hearts was nominated for several year-end awards, including Best Narrative at The Game Awards 2014. Ubisoft later released the game on additional platforms including iOS, Android, Nintendo Switch, and Google Stadia. A sequel, Valiant Hearts: Coming Home, was released in 2023 for Netflix Games and 2024 for Windows and home consoles.

== Gameplay ==
In the game, speech bubbles replace dialogue when characters are conversing with each other.

Valiant Hearts is a side-scrolling, puzzle-based, adventure video game which takes place during World War I. Players assume the role of four characters: Frenchman Emile, his German son-in-law Karl, American soldier Freddie, and Belgian nurse Anna.

The game comprises four chapters split into several sections. Each section requires the player to clear an objective to progress through the story. Most of these involve solving puzzles by obtaining certain items needed for the situation. Other sections include wartime segments requiring the player to survive heavy gunfire, stealth sections where the player must avoid being detected by enemies, and rhythmic car chase sections set to classic songs. Each character can interact with objects, perform a melee attack to knock out guards or smash through debris, and throw projectiles. There are also some traits unique to each character. Emile has a shovel which lets him dig through soft ground, Freddie can cut through barbed wire, and Anna can treat patients for injuries, which requires the player to time button presses.

Players can issue various commands to a dog named Walt, who is able to squeeze into small areas, hold on to and fetch certain items, activate switches, and move around without being suspected by the enemy. The game features optional collectible items hidden in each segment, facts about the war that are unlocked as the game progresses, and a hint system the player can use if they are stuck on a section after a certain amount of time.

== Plot ==
The story begins in the year 1914. Austria-Hungary declares war on Serbia following the assassination of Archduke Franz Ferdinand. In defence of Serbia, Russia declares war on Austria-Hungary, and Austria-Hungary's ally Germany declares war on Russia in response. Anticipating war, France (who is allied with Russia) begins deporting German citizens. Karl, one of the deported Germans, is separated from his wife Marie and their son Victor, and drafted into the German Army. Likewise, Marie's father and Karl's father-in-law Emile is drafted into the French Army. After completing his training, Emile is thrown into combat during the Battle of the Frontiers. His unit is wiped out, and he is wounded, captured, and forced to cook for the Germans. His captor is Baron Von Dorf, who uses many advanced weapons like chlorine gas and zeppelins to defeat his foes. Karl recognises Emile while serving under Von Dorf, but the Allies attack Von Dorf's camp and Karl is forced to flee. After he is rescued from the rubble by Walt, a German Army medical dog, Emile escapes in the confusion and meets Freddie, an American who volunteered to join the French army after his wife was killed in a German bombing raid led by Von Dorf.

Freddie and Emile meet Anna, a Belgian veterinary student who doubles as a battlefield nurse. She is tracking Von Dorf since he is forcing her father to develop advanced war machines. The three chase Von Dorf's zeppelin from Ypres to Reims. When it crashes, Von Dorf escapes with Anna's father in a biplane. Karl survives the crash and is captured and taken as a prisoner of war. Anna accompanies Karl to the prison to make sure he recovers from his wounds.

Emile and Freddie continue their pursuit to exact revenge on Von Dorf and rescue Anna's father. They assault Fort Douaumont at Verdun where Von Dorf is hiding and capture his newest war machine, a large armoured tank. Although they rescue Anna's father, Von Dorf escapes again. While Emile is separated, Freddie continues his pursuit and finally corners Von Dorf during the Battle of the Somme, defeating him in a fist fight atop his ruined tank. Despite his desire for revenge, Freddie realizes he will not gain anything by killing Von Dorf and spares his life. For his repeated failures, Von Dorf is demoted and sent away from the front lines, a fate worse than death for the status-obsessed man.

Meanwhile, in a French prisoner of war camp, Karl learns his son is ill. Determined to reunite with his family, Karl escapes the camp. Unbeknown to this, Emile believes he was killed while trying to escape. Karl encounters Anna, who helps drive him back to his farm at occupied Saint-Mihiel, but they are both captured by the Germans. Karl escapes when the Allies stage another assault that reaches his farm. He discovers it has been shelled with chlorine gas. Karl saves Marie's life by giving her his gas mask, but he succumbs to the gas. Anna arrives and saves Karl's life. When he recovers, Karl is finally reunited with his wife and son after three years of war and exile.

Back on the frontlines, Emile is forced into the bloody and suicidal Nivelle offensive. As his commanding officer constantly forces his troops into the line of fire and to their deaths, Emile finally reaches his breaking point and strikes the officer with his shovel, inadvertently killing him. He is court-martialed and sentenced to death by firing squad despite the protests of other soldiers. As he is dragged to his execution, Freddie and the survivors of the doomed offensive salute him for his heroism. In his final letter to Marie, Emile expresses his hatred of war, his grief at Karl's apparent death and his inability to save his son in law, and hopes that she and her family can find happiness. Emile is executed, and some time later, Karl and his family (with the newly adopted Walt in tow) visit his grave to mourn him. The story ends in 1917 when the United States officially enters the war and sends its army to Europe to fight on the Western Front. The final message states that "Even though their bodies have long since returned to dust, their sacrifice still lives on. We must strive to cherish their memory and never forget..."

=== Coming Home ===
In 1916, German diver Ernst makes a living salvaging sunken ships off the coast in order to avoid the war. However, he is caught in the midst of the Battle of Jutland and despite his best efforts to save drowning sailors, his own ship is sunk in the crossfire. Ernst himself is rescued by the passing submarine blockade runner Germania, and he is accepted as a new crew member. One month later, the Germania docks at Baltimore in the then neutral United States, where Ernst befriends James, a dock worker and Freddie's brother. They both bond over their mutual love for music and promise to play together again after the war. However, upon their return to Germany, the Germania is seized by the German Navy and converted into U-Boat 155 while Ernst is drafted to become part of its new crew.

After the entry of the U.S. into the war in 1917, James decides to enlist with the Harlem Hellfighters despite Freddie's warnings. After completing training, James boards a transport ship bound for Europe but it is spotted by U-Boat 155. Ernst is ordered to torpedo the transport but he spots James on board the ship and deliberately misses his torpedo attack. Meanwhile, Freddie teams up with British RAF pilot George and they both play a key role in winning the Battle of Vimy Ridge. Elsewhere, Anna and Walt are working at a hospital in Sainte-Menehould where she briefly reunites with Freddie right before the town is bombed by the Germans and she risks her life to save wounded civilians. Meanwhile, James' unit finally arrives in France, and are transferred under French command so they can fight on the frontlines. James is deployed to Sainte-Menehould, where he meets Anna and is reunited with Freddie. Despite the run of good fortune, James is quickly reminded of the reality of the war when one of his comrades is killed by a German sniper.

With her duties in Sainte-Menehould finished, Anna heads to her next assignment in Vimy to train British medics. At the British camp, George is alerted by Walt of the presence of a German spy, and they follow the spy through an underground tunnel to the German lines. George manages to recover the intelligence the spy had stolen, and then escapes by stealing a German plane. On the way back to British lines, George catches sight of and takes a picture of the movement of large amounts of German troops and passes the information on when he lands back at base.

In 1918, Russia withdraws from the war with the signing of the Treaty of Brest-Litovsk, allowing Germany to concentrate its forces for the German spring offensive, attacking the Allied lines in a massive assault. James is caught up in the fighting, and he and his unit are able to repel the Germans with heavy losses. Their determined defence would earn the Hellfighters their nickname, and they are invited to Paris to perform a jazz concert, though that does not erase James' memories of the horrors he had witnessed on the frontlines. At sea, Ernst hears of mass mutinies among German naval crews and is inspired to sabotage his U-boat's torpedoes. He is caught in the act, but the U-boat is sunk by the British Navy. Ernst manages to escape but is captured by the British as a prisoner of war. Back on land, the failure of the spring offensive leaves German forces vulnerable, and the Allies embark on the Meuse–Argonne offensive. During the fighting, Freddie is gravely wounded protecting James from an artillery blast, and George airlifts him to a field hospital where Anna treats him. James continues to lead the attack.

After treating Freddie, Anna receives word that Germany has agreed to sign an armistice, and she rings a church bell to notify both sides to cease hostilities. With the war over, Freddie and Anna decide to travel to America, having fallen in love with each other. George's exploits finally earn him the respect of his fellow RAF pilots. James decides to stay in France to help clean up the battlefields and reunites with Ernst, who is now in a POW work detail. However, James receives a letter from Anna and is distraught to hear that Freddie was killed after getting into a confrontation with a pair of racist thugs. Saddened at the loss of his brother, James fulfills his promise to Ernst as they play a solemn song together to mourn Freddie.

== Development ==
Artist Paul Tumelaire began working on Valiant Hearts: The Great War as a solo project in 2011. Additional team members from Ubisoft Montpellier, including directors Yoan Fanise and Simon Chocquet-Bottani, joined to work on the gameplay and the story a half-year later. As 2014 was the centenary of World War I, the team wanted to create a game grounded in history. The title was intended to help players remember the war and to suggest the game is also about love. According to the team, the incidents from World War I "touched" them because their great-grandparents had been involved in the war.

Initially, the developers put equal emphasis on both the storyline and its gameplay, but the gameplay became secondary to the story. The team believed that portraying World War I as a shooter would have made it too violent, and the game would have needed a narrative with a villain and had to depict one of the belligerents as evil. Instead, the team tried to create a game about the trials and tribulations of both sides during the war, showing how individuals lived their lives and struggled to survive. The game does not allow the characters to be actively killed by other in-game characters; the developers hoped to show the human side of the war and feared that allowing players to kill would muddle the message they wanted to convey. The game introduces four characters, and the story switches between them. This enabled the team to create an emotional story with better pacing and ensure that each story beat ends with a cliffhanger. While the story began with some light-hearted moments, the tone of the story became progressively darker and solemn as the war wages on.

The team did not want players to feel overpowered and designed the title as a slow-paced puzzle video game which does not involve much violence. Gameplay mechanics are simple so the game is accessible, but the team introduced different contexts for the use of the gameplay mechanics to ensure they would not become stale. The walking pace of characters was slow to illustrate they are ordinary human beings. According to the team, the presence of these slow puzzle-solving segments helped make the rare action sequences more powerful. As none of the creative leads had experience working on a puzzle game, the team looked at design documents from old LucasArts adventure games for inspiration. They were also inspired by titles including The Cave, Machinarium, and Limbo.

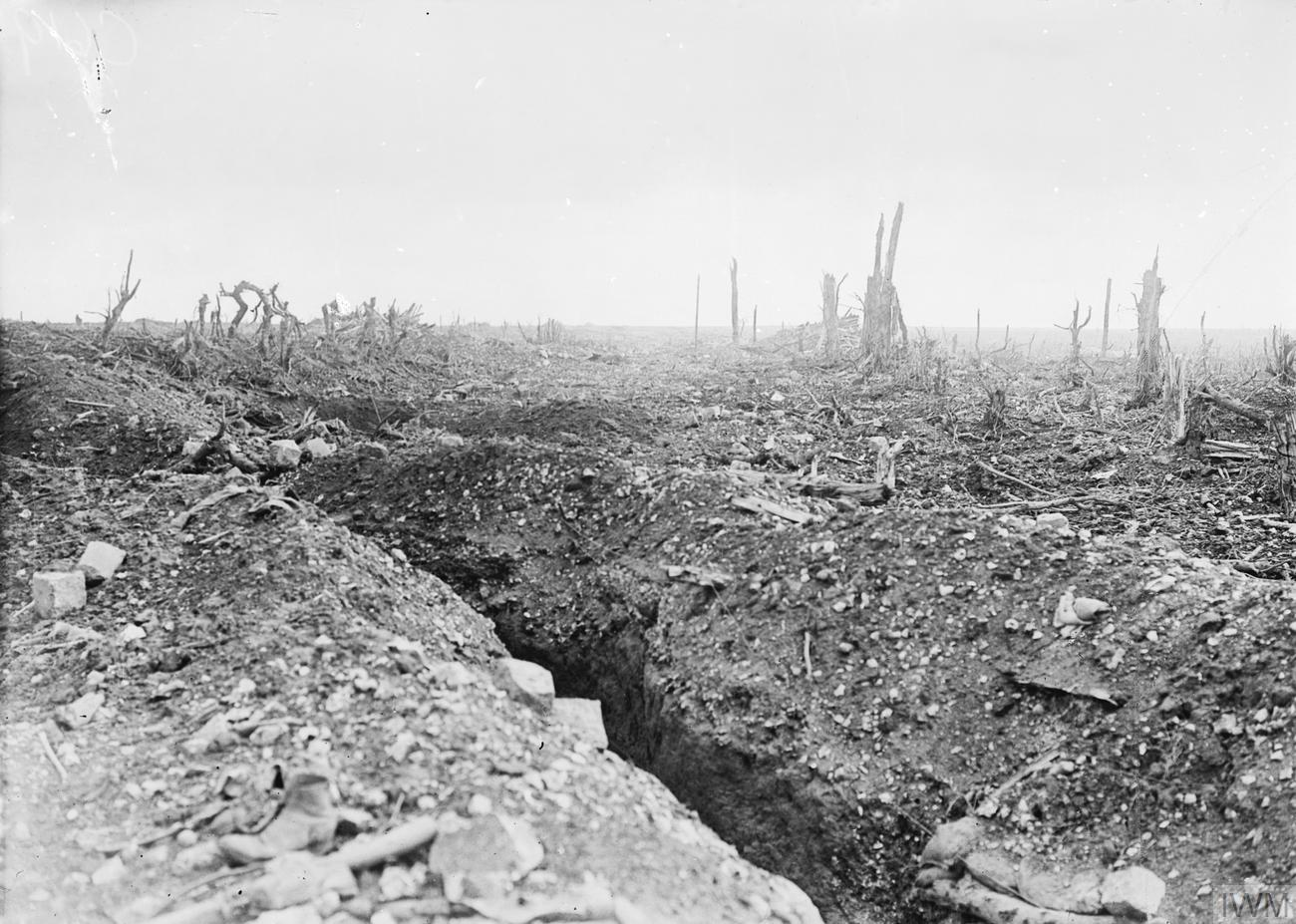
The team traveled to the trenches in France to ensure their depiction in the game was accurate.

To ensure the game was historically accurate, the development team listened to first-hand accounts of the war from team members' families, read letters written by soldiers, and traveled to the trenches in France. The information and stories they collected were then incorporated into the title as collectibles to let players gain new knowledge about the war. Ubisoft also partnered with the producers of the documentary film Apocalypse: World War I to incorporate archived materials into the game. However, the game's cast of protagonists is not based on any historical figure as the team did not want to "cross the line between reality and fiction". To create an "immersive soundscape", the audio team inspected archived documents from the French Foreign Legion, and the development team recorded themselves making various screaming sounds.

The game is powered by Ubisoft's UbiArt Framework game engine, which was used previously in smaller Ubisoft titles including Child of Light and Montpellier's own Rayman Legends. The team opted to use a cartoonish visual, as they believed that this art style helped them to retain "respect for the people who went through ... [the war] while also making it accessible". Speech bubbles serve as the main way of showing conversations between characters, since they help to convey a complicated story in a simple manner. Another reason for their use was to avoid having to deal with different languages. The game's cutscenes are similar to a comic book, showing the player something happening far away from the characters using comic viewpoints.

Ubisoft officially announced the game in September 2013. The game was released for Microsoft Windows, PlayStation 3, PlayStation 4, Xbox 360, and Xbox One via digital download on 25 June 2014. An iOS version of the game was released on 4 September of the same year. Players who purchased the game before 6 November received a free copy of a digital interactive comic book named Valiant Hearts: Dogs of War, which stars Walt and his sister. The game was released for the Nintendo Switch on 8 November 2018, with this version having touchscreen support. It was also released for Google Stadia on 14 July 2022.

== Reception ==
=== Critical reception ===
Reception

Aggregate score
Aggregator	Score
Metacritic	PC: 79/100; PS3: 77/100; PS4: 77/100; XONE: 81/100 iOS: 87/100; NS: 77/100

Review scores
Publication	Score
Destructoid	9/10
Eurogamer	7/10
Game Informer	7/10
GameSpot	8/10
GamesRadar+	3.5/5
IGN	7.7/10
Joystiq	5/5
PC Gamer (US)	65/100
TouchArcade	4.5/5

Valiant Hearts: The Great War received generally positive reviews from critics upon release according to review aggregator Metacritic. Joe Juba from Game Informer praised the game for successfully depicting a human story that showed a side of war that was rarely depicted. Polygon's Danielle Riendeau described the title as "a playable history lesson" noting the game's fictional story, and real-life history resonates with "unexpected intensity". Carolyn Petit of GameSpot admired the game's emphasis on helping people rather than killing them—an uncommon theme in video games. Daniel Krupa from IGN called the game a "beautiful, harrowing experience", while Philippa Warr of PC Gamer noted that the title might have worked better as an "animated comic book adventure" as she felt that the narrative and the interactive components clashed, leaving players feeling detached.

The game's narrative was praised. Chris Carter of Destructoid called the story cohesive and praised its theme of friendship and family. He singled out the beginning of the game for being touching, calling it an "emotional tear-jerker". Eurogamer's Christian Donlan felt that the story suffered from tonal inconsistencies, though he noted that the game worked best when it was "working on an intimate level", singling out a scenario where players have to escape from a prisoner-of-war camp as an example. Petit praised the game's mix of delightful scenes and war segments, which made the game's tone more diverse, and made "the devastation of the game's grimmer scenes more impactful". Juba disliked the game's thin storytelling because the lack of conversation between the characters was not sufficient to tell a nuanced story. Krupa disagreed, saying that despite the strangely intelligible sounds, the game's messages were successfully conveyed to players. Riendeau noted that she became emotionally invested in the characters and that seeing them in dangerous situations during the war created tension and a sense of urgency for players.

The gameplay received generally positive reviews. Carter liked the puzzles, which were accessible and not overly challenging to solve. Critics commonly criticised the game's boss encounters, which have been described as out-of-place and frustrating. Donlan felt that the puzzles were uninspired and that the stealth sections were basic. Juba described the gameplay as shallow and felt that the game was not interesting to play. He also noted that the gameplay did not change or evolve throughout the game's campaign. Lucas Sullivan of GamesRadar and Petit, however, enjoyed the gameplay's variety; Petit noted that there were a lot of imaginative scenarios. Krupa also liked how each chapter of the game introduced an element of World War I as a new puzzle or a new gameplay mechanic for players to learn, though he noted the game's low replay value. Riendeau called the puzzles intuitive, though she noted that some segments were exaggerated to suit the story. Carter praised the collectibles, which feature real-life photos from World War I, for adding context to the game and Montpellier studio for educating players about the war. However, Sullivan and Krupa felt the collectibles obstructed the flow of the game.

The game's graphics received positive comments. Carter noted that the game looked beautiful with a cartoony art style which fit the narrative. Donlan called the game a "visual delight", praising the graphics, saying the hand-drawn art style elicits a sense of "human warmth" in the players. Ludwig Kietzmann of Joystiq agreed, saying that the art style and the animation made the game "inescapably heartfelt" and believed that it helped players to empathise with the characters. Petit called the visuals gorgeous and liked the endearing character designs. She also praised the game's attention to detail, which made the game more immersive. Juba praised the game's soundtracks, calling it "evocative" and "bittersweet" reflecting the game's tone. Krupa called the art direction the game's most striking aspect adding that playing through the game is similar to "watching a wonderful piece of animation".

=== Accolades ===
Year	Award	Category	Result	Ref.
2014	Golden Joystick Awards 2014	Best Original Game	Nominated	
2014	Golden Joystick Awards 2014	Best Gaming Moment	Nominated	
2014	Golden Joystick Awards 2014	Best Visual Design	Nominated	
2014	The Game Awards 2014	Best Narrative	Won	
2014	The Game Awards 2014	Games for Change	Won	
2015	42nd Annie Awards	Best Video Game	Won	
2015	18th Annual D.I.C.E. Awards	Adventure Game of the Year	Nominated	
2015	18th Annual D.I.C.E. Awards	Outstanding Achievement in Art Direction	Nominated	
2015	18th Annual D.I.C.E. Awards	Outstanding Achievement in Sound Design	Nominated	
2015	18th Annual D.I.C.E. Awards	Outstanding Achievement in Story	Nominated	
2015	SXSW Gaming Awards 2017	Excellence in Musical Score	Nominated	
2015	SXSW Gaming Awards 2017	Excellence in Narrative	Nominated	
2015	11th British Academy Games Awards	Artistic Achievement	Nominated	
2015	11th British Academy Games Awards	Original Property	Won	
2015	14th National Academy of Video Game Trade Reviewers Awards	Original Dramatic Score (New IP)	Nominated	
2015	14th National Academy of Video Game Trade Reviewers Awards	Game (Original Role Playing)	Nominated	
2015	14th National Academy of Video Game Trade Reviewers Awards	Costume Design	Nominated	
2015	14th National Academy of Video Game Trade Reviewers Awards	Art Direction (Period Influence)	Nominated	
2015	14th National Academy of Video Game Trade Reviewers Awards	Animation, Artistic	Nominated	

== Sequel ==
A direct sequel, Valiant Hearts: Coming Home, was released on 31 January 2023 on Netflix through their game library available for iOS and Android. The game was then released on 7 March 2024 for Nintendo Switch, PlayStation 4, Xbox One, and Windows through Ubisoft Connect, and later Steam.

== See also ==
- 11-11: Memories Retold, a video game by the same director commemorating the centennial of the armistice
