= Cooking Mama: Cook Off =

2007 video game

- North American Wii cover art
- Developer: Office Create
- Publishers: JP: Taito; NA: Majesco; PAL: 505 Games
- Composer: Masayoshi Ishi
- Series: Cooking Mama
- Platform: Wii
- Release: JP: February 8, 2007; NA: March 20, 2007; EU: May 11, 2007; AU: May 18, 2007
- Genres: Simulation, minigames
- Modes: Single-player, multiplayer

Cooking Mama: Cook Off (Note: Cooking Mama: Cooking with Everyone! (クッキングママ みんなといっしょにお料理大会!, Kukkingu Mama: Minna to Issho ni Oryōri Taikai!)) is a video game for the Wii developed by Office Create and published by Taito in Japan, Majesco in North America, and 505 Games in Europe and Australia. It is a spin off of the Nintendo DS game Cooking Mama. The game was released in Japan on February 8, 2007 and in North America on March 20, 2007. In Europe (other than in Germany), it was released on May 11, 2007, with an Australian release closely following on May 18, 2007. The Wii sequel to this game, Cooking Mama: World Kitchen was released in the US in November 2008.

== Gameplay ==
Cook Off is a cooking simulation, where dishes are prepared by completing a series of short minigames. Each minigame represents a step in the meal preparation process, with a complete dish requiring anywhere from two to more than a dozen such steps. Players use the Wii Remote to mimic real-life cooking movements such as rolling, slicing, chopping, and stirring. For example, during a minigame involving grinding up raw beef, the player might be instructed to move the Wii Remote in a circular motion as if grasping the handle of a meat grinder. Both the Wii Remote's motion sensing and positional/pointing capabilities may be utilized, depending on the minigame.

Cook Off features 55 recipes using over 300 ingredients. Although the initial number of accessible recipes is relatively small, new recipes are unlocked as previous recipes are successfully completed. Available recipes are displayed in a cookbook, along with a small national flag next to each, indicating each recipe's country of origin. While Cook Off includes fewer total recipes than Cooking Mama, recipes have a greater average number of steps and/or ingredients.

The dishes come from 10 countries: France, the United States, the United Kingdom, Spain, Japan, Italy, China, Germany, India, and Russia.

=== Scoring ===
As with the previous title, the player's performance is rated based on how quickly and accurately he or she can perform the various tasks. The player is awarded a score after each minigame, with the score factoring in both successful completion and the amount of time remaining. After the dish is completed, a medal is awarded based upon the average performance in each of the minigames. Unlike the original Cooking Mama, the best total score is stored as a high score, so that players can continue to try and surpass their previous performance on a dish even after winning a gold medal.

If players complete an entire minigame without making a mistake, or otherwise perform a given sub-task perfectly, they may be awarded a small score bonus for their skill.

=== New modes ===
The primary new play mode (as compared to the original Cooking Mama) is the Friends and Food of the World mode. In this mode, players challenge fictitious friends from various foreign countries to make their favorite recipes. Each friend has different ethnic or national recipes which they specialize in; in total, the game includes recipes from 10 countries. As friends rarely make mistakes, players must be proficient at creating a given dish if they hope to win. Defeating the opponent rewards the player with a piece of cooking gear or utensil (often adorned in gold), while failure earns a consolation prize with which to decorate the kitchen.

The game also includes a new two-player mode, titled Friends and Food, in which players compete head-to-head preparing the same recipe. Both players play simultaneously (each with their own Wii Remote) using a split-screen view. After the dish is completed, the total scores of both players are compared and one is declared the winner.

=== Recipes ===
There are 55 recipes such as pan fried lobster, pierogie, cream puffs and sushi.

== Reception ==
Reception

Aggregate scores
Aggregator	Score
GameRankings	62.81%
Metacritic	61/100

Review scores
Publication	Score
Electronic Gaming Monthly	7.5/10
Eurogamer	5/10
Famitsu	29/40
Game Informer	6.75/10
GameSpot	5.5/10
GameSpy	3/5 stars
IGN	(US) 5.8/10 (AU) 5/10
Nintendo Power	7.5/10

The game received "mixed" reviews according to video game review aggregator website Metacritic.

Prior to the title's release, early press generated a certain level of excitement, with Wired proclaiming Cooking Mama: Cook Off the "Best Game of CES 2007". However, after playing the finished product, several reviews noted that the game was not nearly as responsive or intuitive as its predecessor. According to reviewers, a simple action with the Wii Remote can be difficult to perform successfully, leading to a frustrating experience. While the game was reported to still be fun, the lack of tactile feedback and several nagging control issues detract from the overall enjoyment.

In Japan, Famitsu gave it a score of one six, two eights, and one seven, for a total of 29 out of 40. Elsewhere, in the May 2007 issue, Electronic Gaming Monthly's three editors gave the game marks of 7/10, 7.5/10 and 8/10, earning it an overall score of 7.5 out of 10. In 2009, Games Magazine gave it a favorable review, concluding that the game "should appeal to anyone".
