= Road 96 =

2021 video game

- Cover art for Road 96
- Developer: DigixArt
- Publishers: DigixArt; Plug In Digital; Ravenscourt (Note: Ravenscourt published the game's Xbox and PlayStation versions.)
- Director: Yoan Fanise
- Producer: Anne-Laure Fanise
- Designers: Tristan Hilare; François Rizzo; Benoit Villain
- Programmer: Bastien Giafferi
- Artist: Charles Boury
- Engine: Unity
- Platforms: Nintendo Switch; PlayStation 4; PlayStation 5; Windows; Xbox One; Xbox Series X and Series S
- Release: Nintendo Switch, Windows; August 16, 2021; PlayStation 4, PlayStation 5, Xbox One, Xbox Series X/S; April 14, 2022
- Genre: Adventure
- Mode: Single-player

Road 96 is a 2021 adventure video game developed by DigixArt. Set in the fictional authoritarian nation of Petria in Summer 1996, the player controls a series of nameless teenagers attempting to flee the country by reaching its northern border as political tensions rise with its upcoming election. The player navigates procedurally-generated journeys composed of various segments in different locations, traveling between them by walking, hitchhiking, or using vehicles including buses, cars, and taxis. In each, the player interacts with eight recurring non-playable characters and engages in minigames before resuming their journey. Each journey can end in success, arrest, or death, which in turn influences the narrative of subsequent runs. The game culminates on Petria's election day, in which the result is based on the player's actions throughout.

Road 96 was developed by DigixArt, with the goal of creating a narrative-driven adventure that offered a different experience with each playthrough. The team spent two years designing the storytelling system for the game's procedural structure. They drew inspiration from road trip films of the 1990s and the works of filmmakers like the Coen brothers, Bong Joon Ho, and Quentin Tarantino. Many characters were based on those from films and television from the 1980s and 1990s, and aspects of the gameplay, including escape methods, were inspired by real-life stories from people who lived behind the Iron Curtain. The development team of 15 sought to combine action, exploration, and human encounters, with each segment designed to last 30 to 50 minutes to emulate the feel of a television series.

The game was released on the Nintendo Switch and Windows on August 16, 2021, being published by the developer in partnership with Plug In Digital. It was later released for the PlayStation 4, PlayStation 5, Xbox One, and Xbox Series X and Series S on April 14, 2022, by DigixArt and Ravenscourt. Road 96 received generally positive reviews from critics, who praised its storytelling, characters, and soundtrack. Reviewers responded negatively to the game's handling of its political themes and occasional performance issues. A prequel, titled Road 96: Mile 0, was announced in January 2023 and was later released on April 4.

== Gameplay ==
Road 96 is a single-player, procedurally-generated adventure game played from a first-person perspective. (Note: Attributed to multiple references:) The player controls a series of nameless teenagers who attempt to flee their corrupt home country of Petria by traveling to its border and illegally crossing.

Each journey begins hundreds of miles from the border, with the player aiming to reach a mountain checkpoint near it. Journeys are composed of various segments that take place in different locations. The segments see the player interact with one of the game's eight core non-playable characters and often incorporate strategy video game elements and minigames. The player must manage their energy throughout the game, which can be replenished by buying food or resting. Energy functions as health; if it reaches zero, the player will pass out on the side of the road and be arrested. Once a segment is completed, the player travels to their next location, which they can do by catching a bus, hitchhiking, ordering a taxi, stealing a car, or walking. Travelling by bus or taxi allows the player to rest and recover lost health but costs money. Walking or hitchhiking are free travel options, though walking gradually depletes the player's health and hitchhiking is unpredictable, as it can lead to hostile encounters or violent situations. Depending on the player's actions or dialogue decisions, their journey can culminate in arrest, death, or successfully crossing the border.

No matter the outcome of the journey, once completed, the player begins again as another anonymous teenager. Before their new run, the player is given a choice of three teens to play as, each having a different starting attributes such as cash, energy, and distance from the border. Non-playable characters you interact with remember and may mention events from earlier playthroughs. Each journey reveals more about the main characters through the player's new interactions with them. As the player repeatedly encounters recurring characters, a completion meter for each fills until their individual storylines are resolved. As the player completes recursive journeys, the Petrian presidential election gradually gets closer. Propaganda posters for the political candidates can be vandalized.

The game features a collectible system where the player can uncover and listen to different cassette tapes. They can acquire the cassettes by finding them, purchasing them, and stealing them. The game's wider narrative develops with each choice made by the player. Throughout the game, the player gains skills such as intelligence, hacking, lock-picking, and improved luck. After the player's final teenager reaches the border and election day arrives, the outcome of the election is based on their previous in-game choices.

== Plot ==
In 1996, the authoritarian nation of Petria prepares for a presidential election between new candidate Florres, who vaguely promises change to the nation, and Petria's long-standing dictator, Tyrak, whose win would doom the prospects of the country's working class. Ten years earlier, in 1986, a landslide, caused by an explosion on a mountain pass, killed many civilians during a televised event. The government blamed the terrorist group known as the Black Brigades for the fatalities and concluded that their bombing was an attempt to assassinate Petria's president, Tyrak. In reality, the explosion was orchestrated by Tyrak to discredit the Brigades and eliminate civilians he believed were sympathetic to them. Tyrak controls the security forces to pay off officers to suppress protests against him, and he manipulates state media to portray dissenters as terrorists. Teenagers who oppose his policies are secretly arrested and sent to labor camps known as the "iron pits", prompting many young Petrian citizens to attempt to flee by crossing the northern border.

Throughout the game, the player repeatedly interacts with eight characters whose stories develop individually. Sonya is a wealthy and corrupt news reporter who proudly spreads Tyrak's propaganda. It is revealed that during her coverage of the 1986 disaster, she failed to save a young girl from being killed. The girl was the daughter of Jarod, a taxi driver and serial killer, who plots to assassinate Sonya throughout the game, believing she didn't try hard enough to save his daughter, Lola. Lola was a member of the Brigades, whom he blames for her death as the media reported that they caused the landslide. Stan and Mitch are twin brothers and robbers who travel Petria in search of money. They pass their time by attempting to find the identity of a murderer, who is revealed to be Jarod. Their story ends as Jarod overhears Sonya talking about her genuine attempt to save his daughter, and he decides she no longer deserves to die. Sonya reconnects with Stan and Mitch, who transpire to be her brothers, as the police fail to apprehend Jarod.

Zoe is a rebellious teenager who hopes to flee Petria. She is recruited into the Brigades, despite her father supporting Tyrak. The Brigades ultimately give her the opportunity to flee Petria by creating a distraction at the border, which she can either successfully take advantage of or be killed in the process. John is a friendly truck driver grieving his girlfriend's death in the disaster. He is revealed to be one of two leaders of the Brigades, along with the more violent Robert. In his truck, John carries a radio that broadcasts the Brigades' propaganda, which the police are searching for throughout the game. Alex is a young, tech-savvy teenage runaway who has become affiliated with the Brigades, as they promise him information about his biological parents, also former members of the Brigades, in return for helping build them explosives. It is revealed that Alex's parents built the bomb responsible for the 1986 attack. Alex's adoptive mother, Fanny, is a policewoman patrolling the border. She feels conflicted about Tyrak's regime and has developed a romance with John over a radio, unaware he is a Brigade member.

By election day, political unrest reaches its peak. Depending on the player's decisions throughout, Petria faces one of three outcomes: a) Tyrak is re-elected, tightening his authoritarian rule, b) Florres wins, leading to Tyrak's arrest for his crimes, or c), a popular uprising erupts, overthrowing the regime in a violent revolution. In the ending that depicts Tyrak winning, Fanny shoots John, and Alex runs away. In the others, the three unite and become a family unit in the midst of the carnage.

== Development and release ==
Road 96 was developed by DigixArt. For the first year of development, anyone on the 15-person team was allowed to suggest characters, events, and story ideas for the game. Fanise said that the idea to frame the story around teenagers trying to escape an oppressive government arose after visiting 11 Bit Studios in Poland, as several developers had stories of the struggles of living through communist rule during the Soviet era. Some of the escape methods depicted in the game were inspired by real-life stories from people who lived behind the Iron Curtain. Petria's design and political climate was described by Fanise as a mix of corrupt real-world political systems. The design for Petria's border took inspiration from the border between China and Tibet.

Afterwards, the team worked on connecting the ideas. It was created to be unlike any other narrative-based video game, and to give the player a different experience each time they play. The team spent two years developing the game's storytelling system before beginning production on the rest of the game. DigixArt co-founder Yoan Fanise said much of the game's mechanics were designed around the system. Early in development, it was decided that the game would heavily involve traveling as the system was designed to involve moving between different locations and time frames. The story was designed around the system's limitations, which meant the player couldn't be killed too many times, world-changing events weren't included, and the player controlled different characters throughout. Game segments can be presented in any order, controlled by the game's artificial intelligence. The game was funded by HP Omen.

Digixart described the game as a mix of "action, exploration, contemplative melancholy, human encounters, and wacky situations." Each segment is completed in 30 to 50 minutes, which Fanise said was intentional as it emulated the feel of a television series. Road 96 took inspiration from the work of filmmakers such as the Coen brothers, Bong Joon Ho, and Quentin Tarantino. (Note: Attributed to multiple references:) Many of the characters were based on those from 1980s and 1990s films and television shows. Namely, Alex was based on Data from The Goonies (1985), and Stan and Mitch were inspired by the air pirates from Porco Rosso (1992). Fanise additionally cited the film Into the Wild (2007) as an inspiration for the game's tone and themes. Fanise said the game's atmosphere was inspired by road trip movies released in the 1990s, and that its soundtrack also incorporated popular music from the time period.

The game was announced in December at The Game Awards 2020. It was teased as part of Nintendo's Indie World Showcase in April 2021. In June 2021, its trailer was showcased at Summer Game Fest. In July 2021, the social media site Facebook blocked an advert for the game, citing its political undertones, despite the advert making no direct political references. It was released on August 16, 2021 for the Nintendo Switch and Windows PC. The game was published by DigixArt and Plug In Digital. It was listed as one of the best-selling indie video games on the Nintendo Switch in 2021. In February 2022, it was announced that Road 96 would be released on PlayStation and Xbox. It was later released on the PlayStation 4, PlayStation 5, Xbox One, and Xbox Series X and Series S on April 14, 2022, being published by DigixArt in collaboration with Ravenscourt. (Note: Attributed to multiple references:) In July 2022, it was made available on Xbox Game Pass. After being removed, it later returned on January 7, 2025.

== Reception ==
=== Critical response ===
Reception

Aggregate scores
Aggregator	Score
Metacritic	NS: 75/100; PC: 79/100; PS5: 77/100; XSX: 78/100
OpenCritic	74% recommended

Review scores
Publication	Score
Destructoid	7.5/10
Eurogamer	8/10
GameSpot	6/10
HobbyConsolas	80/100
IGN	8/10
Nintendo World Report	8/10
NME	5/5
PC Gamer (UK)	77/100
Push Square	7/10
RPGFan	82/100
Shacknews	8/10
The Games Machine (Italy)	8.3/10
VentureBeat	4/5

According to the review aggregator website Metacritic, Road 96 received "generally favorable reviews". (Note: Attributed to multiple references:) OpenCritic reported that 74% of 92 critics recommended the game.

The gameplay was generally well-received and considered engaging by reviewers. (Note: Attributed to multiple references:) Alessandro Barbosa of GameSpot, Christopher Byrd of The Washington Post, and Jon Bailes of NME liked how the game utilized minigames in its segments, agreeing that it helped keep it engaging. (Note: Attributed to multiple references:) Alice Bell of Rock Paper Shotgun appreciated how the game's structure let the player apply knowledge gained from previous journeys. Eurogamer's Marco Procida and GameSpot's Barbosa also named the game's collectible system as a highlight. Despite this, several were critical of performance problems. (Note: Attributed to multiple references:) Donovan Erskine of Shacknews commented on how the game's frame rate occasionally dipped and Dean Takahashi of VentureBeat reported that the game frequently crashed.

Critics widely praised the game's array of characters. (Note: Attributed to multiple references:) Bailes described the characters as an "eclectic bunch" and praised the range of personalities and backgrounds each character had, arguing that it kept the game exciting and fresh, while Christian Donlan (Eurogamer) admired the depth and traits of the characters. The dialogue and voice acting received a mixed response. (Note: Attributed to multiple references:) While Joe DeVader of Nintendo World Report described it as "stilted", RPGFan's Jerry Williams praised the actors for their convincing delivery.

Critics responded positively to the game's concept and storytelling approach. (Note: Attributed to multiple references:) Alberto Lloret of HobbyConsolas and Claudio Magistrelli of The Games Machine called the narrative the game's greatest strength, with Magistrelli writing that its story structure as something that distinguished it from similar games that came before. Erskine and Rachel Watts (PC Gamer) were impressed by how each character's individual stories fit together cohesively. Many also complimented the game's use of tension. (Note: Attributed to multiple references:) Bailes said the game's unpredictability allowed it to feel exciting and tension-filled. Takahashi also appreciated the game's grounded portrayal of hitchhiking.

Critics broadly agreed that Road 96 mishandled its political themes. (Note: Attributed to multiple references:) Barbosa argued the central conflict oversimplified its message by depicting Tyrak as purely evil and Florres as wholly good. Byrd and Watts also found the game's political commentary shallow and lacking of meaningful political or social insight. In contrast, however, Williams liked how the game balanced its silly characters and occasionally light-hearted tone with the themes of political unrest and corruption.

The soundtrack received strong praise from reviewers. (Note: Attributed to multiple references:) Procida described the game's soundtrack as "decidedly atmospheric", and DeVader appreciated how the soundtrack reflected the game's time period. Erskine enjoyed the varied genres and found the music "integral to the Road 96 experience". The presentation and visuals of Road 96 received mixed reactions. (Note: Attributed to multiple references:) DeVader criticized the uncanny character designs, while Tristan Ogilvie of IGN disliked the reuse of character models; both mentioned that generally impressive visuals were undermined by a short draw distance. Erskine praised the art style, finding it fitting to the game's atmosphere. Williams noted an "odd floaty feeling" to the first-person movement, which he said hurt the game's immersion.

=== Accolades ===
At the INDIE Live Expo Winter 2021, Road 96 was voted the winner of the Grand Prize and Theme of the Year Award. In March 2022, Road 96 won five different awards at the Pégases Awards, for Best Accessibility, Best Indie Game, Best Narrative Design, Best Sound Design, and Beyond the Video Game. It was listed as a finalist for the Best Gameplay Award at the Games for Change Awards in July 2022.

== Analysis ==
Road 96 has been described as an overtly political game. Rock Paper Shotgun's Alice Bell interpreted it as taking a left-wing political stance, as the game asks how to resist, rather than whether the player should resist or not. It touches on themes such as changing a corrupt electoral system, the complications of choosing between protesting and rebellion, and the doubt surrounding a broken country's ability to recover from systemic failure. The game portrays its teen runaways as being powerless and unable to change the minds of their parents, with their only choice being to escape their country. The game's depiction of Tyrak and his party have been compared to right-wing politics in the United States, particularly to the first presidency of Donald Trump. (Note: Attributed to multiple references:) The game's depiction of politically motivated media manipulation, in the form of Sonya and her show being influenced by Tyrak's regime, was compared to Fox News by Takahashi. Tyrak's name has also been noted for its phonetic similarity to both Trump and tyrant.

Petria's design has been compared to that of the Southwestern United States. Jade King of TheGamer compared the game's fictional 1986 Petria disaster to real-world events such as the Columbine High School massacre and the September 11 attacks, noting that within the story the incident serves as a defining moment that changes Petria's political climate and fuels media-driven hostility toward groups associated with the perpetrators. King also argued that the game depicts some of Petria's citizens as ideologically entrenched due to propaganda, presenting them as largely resistant to persuasion and highlighting that persistent political divide is inevitable, no matter what progress is made, both within Petria and real life.

== Prequel and sequel ==
In January 2023, it was announced that a prequel to Road 96 – entitled Road 96: Mile 0 – would be released on April 4. Set in White Sands, the sole luxurious area of Petria, the player switches control between Kaito (who originally appeared in DigixArt's first game, Lost in Harmony) and Zoe (returning from Road 96), who come from different backgrounds and form a friendship in the lead-up to the events of Road 96. Mile 0 is an adventure game with musical elements. Like its predecessor, Mile 0 was developed by DigixArt and released on the Nintendo Switch, PlayStation 4, PlayStation 5, Windows PC, Xbox One, and Xbox Series X. It was published by Ravenscourt and released on April 4, 2023.

In August 2026, a direct sequel to Road 96 was first teased during THQ Nordic Digital Showcase 2026. Like the previous titles, it was developed by DigixArt, though published by THQ Nordic.
