= Lost in Harmony =

2016 video game

- Developer: Digixart Entertainment
- Publishers: Playdius (Nintendo Switch, Microsoft Windows)
- Engine: Unity
- Platforms: Android, iOS, Nintendo Switch, Microsoft Windows
- Release: 20 January 2016 (iOS); 4 February 2016 (Android; 21 June 2018 (Nintendo Switch, Microsoft Windows)
- Genre: Rhythm game
- Mode: Single-player

Lost in Harmony (also subtitled Lost in Harmony: Kaito's Adventure) is a rhythm game developed by Digixart Entertainment, which was released for iOS in January 2016 and for Android in February 2016. Versions for Nintendo Switch and Microsoft Windows were published by Playdius in June 2018.

== Gameplay ==
Lost in Harmony features skateboarding teenage boy Kaito with his female friend Aya rides upon his back. The player controls the skateboard's position by touch gestures while tapping to a song's rhythm. In addition to classical music, Wyclef Jean composed an original song for the game.

== Development and release ==
Lost in Harmony is the first game developed by French developer Digixart Entertainment, announced on 18 September 2015 at Tokyo Game Show. It was released for iOS on 20 January 2016 and for Android on 4 February, World Cancer Day. On Android, part of the game was offered for free due to significant online piracy, while for both platforms additional game content was offered via in-app purchases. The game would be considered successful if it reached 100 000 downloads according to co-founder and director Yoan Fanise. A new story, M.I.R.A.I.'s Escape, was released on 15 December 2016. In 2017, the game became free-to-play on iOS as well.

Versions for Nintendo Switch and Microsoft Windows were published by Playdius on 21 June 2018. The Japanese version was published by Worker Bee Inc.

== Reception ==
Harry Slater of Pocket Gamer criticized the collision detection but praised music and presentation. TouchArcade's Shaun Musgrave felt the gameplay to be lacking but the presentation to be overwhelming enough for recommendation. VentureBeat found the game trying "to be too many things at once", but praise genuine and heartfelt moments. Gamezebo's Jason Faulkner similarly thought the game elements did not come together cohesively. William Audureau of Le Monde criticized story's themes as clumsy. ExtraLife.fr's Valérie Précigout was less critical of the theme.

The game was nominated at France's Ping Awards 2016 for best mobile game and best soundtrack.

== Legacy ==
In August 2016, Yoan Fanise stated in an interview regarding Lost in Harmony's monetization that they concluded from it that the premium model is not viable for mobile games.
