= Gardening Mama =

2009 video game

- Nintendo DS cover art
- Developer: Cooking Mama Limited
- Publishers: JP: Taito; NA: Majesco; PAL: 505 Games
- Composer: Yasuhiro Kawakami
- Series: Cooking Mama
- Platform: Nintendo DS
- Release: Nintendo DS: JP: March 19, 2009; NA: March 31, 2009; EU: May 1, 2009; AU: May 14, 2009; iOS: WW: September 23, 2010
- Genres: Simulation, minigame
- Modes: Single-player, multiplayer

Gardening Mama (Japanese: ガーデニングママ, Hepburn: Gādeningu Mama) (stylized as gardening mama) is a gardening simulation-styled minigame compilation video game for the Nintendo DS, and it was later ported to iOS in 2010. It is a spin-off from the Cooking Mama series.

The gameplay is similar to that of Cooking Mama, with players using the stylus to plant bulbs, dig trenches and water plants. Players can also make items such as jack-o-lanterns and jams from their fruits and vegetables, and players can trade their produce with others.

A sequel to Gardening Mama, Gardening Mama 2: Forest Friends, was released for the 3DS in September 2013.

== Gameplay ==
=== "Let's Get Growing!" ===
"Let's Get Growing" is the main game mode where the player grows a variety of plants in a garden, ranging between flowers, fruits, and vegetable. Players initially start with only a few flowers, but are able to unlock more plants and garden areas after finishing complete flower cycles (from planting the seed to when the flower blooms). Like previous Mama games, for a plant to grow the player needs to complete a series of mini games; however instead of playing each stage consecutively, only one stage can be played at time. The next stage becomes available once the player completes another stage for a different plant, or the next time the player turns on their handheld device.

After completing a stage, the player's performance is evaluated with a numerical score out of 100, and awarded either a bronze, silver, or gold medal. After completing a full plant cycle the player's overall performance is evaluated, and given an averaged score out of 100 and a corresponding medal.

There are many different mini-games available, for example: planting seeds/saplings; watering plants; cutting off or removing weak/dead parts of plants; shooing away pests and rodents; harvesting produce; and making rainbows using a watering hose.

Players also have a "practice" option.

=== Multiplayer ===
In the "Let's Play Together" mode, Gardening Mama supports wireless multiplayer, along with "Download Play". During such a contest, players compete in individual minigames. Players can also exchange produce they have grown with the "Cute Treasure Chest" function.

=== Bonus sections ===
If a player completes a stage under a certain time they receive a "bonus sapling". For every three bonuses earned players receive an unlockable item, such as accessories for Mama, decorative gardening items, or extra items that can be used in the game.

There are two bonus sections: "Decorate the Garden!" and "Make it Fancy!"

In "Decorate the Garden", players can add decorative items they have unlocked to their garden, such as small flower pots and garden gnomes. The "Spruce Up Your Screen" menu can also be opened from here to change the appearance of various gardening tools and background items.

In "Make it Fancy", players can use unlocked clothing items to customize Mama's appearance. Various accessories, like glasses and earrings, can be added; Mama's clothing can also be changed.

Special fertilizers can also be unlocked via the bonus saplings, which allow growing unique plants that can be grown in an area called "Special Garden".

== Reception ==
Reception

Aggregate scores
Aggregator	Score
GameRankings	62%
Metacritic	60/100

Review scores
Publication	Score
Famitsu	30/40
Game Informer	6.5/10
GameSpot	7/10
IGN	4.9/10
Nintendo Life	6/10
Nintendo Power	8/10
Nintendo World Report	7/10

The game received "mixed or average" reviews according to video game review aggregator website Metacritic. In Japan, Famitsu gave it a score of one eight, one seven, one eight, and one seven, for a total of 30 out of 40.

Game Informer's Brian Vore said that while Gardening Mama was on par with previous Cooking Mama games, it shared many of the same issues. Vore criticized the game's "repetitive minigames, spotty control, and lack of depth."

Chris Hoffman of Nintendo Power was more positive, scoring the game 8/10 and praising the "more arcadelike and skill-based" approach to minigames when compared to other Mama titles.
