= Cooking Mama Limited =

Japanese video game developer

- Native name: クッキングママ リミテッド
- Formerly: Office Create
- Company type: Developer
- Industry: Video game industry
- Founded: April 3, 1990
- Headquarters: Yokohama, Japan
- Area served: Worldwide
- Products: Cooking Mama series
- Website: http://www.ofcr.co.jp

Cooking Mama Limited (Note: Japanese: クッキングママ リミテッド, Hepburn: Kukkingumama Rimiteddo) is a Japanese developer of video games. Most of their games were unreleased outside Japan and received no particular critical or commercial attention - notable exceptions to this are Cooking Mama for the Nintendo DS and iOS, and Cooking Mama: Cook Off for the Wii of the Cooking Mama series.

Originally known as Office Create (Note: 株式会社オフィスクリエイト, Kabushiki-Gaisha Ofisu Kurieito), (Note: Although the Office Create name is dropped in favor of Cooking Mama Limited name, the old brand still used in several occasions.) the company changed its name to Cooking Mama Limited as a positive response to its unanticipated success in the series, which has sold over four million units worldwide as of May 2009.

== Legal issues regarding Cooking Mama: Cookstar ==
In March 2020, Planet Entertainment LLC released the game Cooking Mama: Cookstar on the Nintendo eShop. The game received mixed reviews, with several gaming publications noting technical problems with motion detection. Despite these issues, some praised the game for its inclusivity of vegetarian dishes, including an award from People for the Ethical Treatment of Animals (PETA). However, the game was later removed from the eShop for unknown reasons.

Subsequently, on April 15, 2020, Office Create, the holder of the Cooking Mama IP, announced via its website that the launch and take-down of Cookstar was due to a dispute between Office Create and Planet Entertainment LLC, the publisher for the game. The company also stated that it would be evaluating its legal options against the publishing company regarding the unauthorized release of Cooking Mama: Cookstar. The dispute centered on the claim that Planet Entertainment breached its contract by releasing the game despite failing to meet quality standards required by the company, stating that Office Create “rejected a wide range of deficiencies affecting the overall feel, quality, and content of the game.” Along with the announcement of the lawsuit, Office Create announced that they had no intentions of releasing the game on the PlayStation 4 and that there was no licensing agreement in place for this version of the game. Despite this announcement, Cooking Mama: Cookstar went on to be released for the PlayStation 4 in April 2021. On November 17, 2022, Office Create returned to their website to once again announce the findings of the arbitration brought before the International Chamber of Commerce International Court of Arbitration (ICC). The court found that the publishing company and its CEO were not authorized to release the game for both Nintendo Switch and PlayStation 4, that the agreement between the two companies had been rightfully terminated, and that the games infringed on the copyright of the Cooking Mama IP. In their statement, Office Create apologized for the situation and emphasized their commitment to maintaining the quality standards that fans of the Cooking Mama series have come to expect.
