= Nano Assault Neo =

2012 video game

- Developer: Shin'en Multimedia
- Publisher: Shin'en Multimedia
- Director: Manfred Linzner
- Designer: Manfred Linzner
- Artist: Martin Sauter
- Composer: Martin Schioeler
- Platforms: Wii U PlayStation 4
- Release: Wii U: NA: 18 November 2012; PAL: 30 November 2012; PlayStation 4: NA: 11 November 2014
- Genre: Multidirectional shooter
- Modes: Single-player, multiplayer

Nano Assault Neo is a 2012 multidirectional shooter video game developed and published by Shin'en Multimedia for the Wii U. It was a launch title for the system on 18 November 2012 in North America, and in PAL regions on 30 November 2012. It was released in Japan on 27 February 2013 by Arc System Works. It is the sequel to the 2011 Nintendo 3DS game Nano Assault.

The game was ported to the PlayStation 4 in 2014 under the title Nano Assault Neo X. It features improved visuals, including running at 1080p. It has the distinction of being Shin'en's first game to appear on a non-Nintendo console.

== Gameplay ==
The objective of the game is to eradicate the microscopic deadly Nanostray (Note: "Nanostray" is the name of a virus featured in two of Shin'en's previous games: Nanostray and Nanostray 2.) virus, before it wipes out humanity. Players pilot a small capsule over various body cells and are required to fire upon enemy virus particles. The game is divided into 4 clusters, each featuring 4 further levels, which the player must complete to unlock the next. Players can also collect tokens which can be used to purchase power-ups in-between levels, such as shields and special items. Online leaderboards are also featured. The game supports Off-TV Play. A co-operative local multiplayer mode allows for two people to play each level simultaneously, with one player using the Wii U GamePad and the other using a Pro Controller, Wii Remote and Nunchuk or Classic Controller, on the TV.

== Reception ==
The game has received mainly positive and some mixed reviews, with a score on Metacritic of 71. Nintendo Life gave the game an 8/10, calling it "a great game that is a little light on content." IGN gave it a 9/10, strongly praising its graphics, calling it "a visual spectacle. Truly, wonderfully stunning." Eurogamer was much more critical, saying, "Nano Assault Neo is my least favourite kind of game; the kind that follows in others' footsteps with little to call its own."
