= Well Dweller =

2026 video game

- Developer: Kyle Thompson
- Publisher: Top Hat Studios
- Designer: Kyle Thompson
- Programmer: Kyle Thompson
- Artist: Kyle Thompson
- Composer: Eric Thompson
- Platforms: Windows, Nintendo Switch, Nintendo Switch 2, PlayStation 5, Xbox Series X/S
- Release: September 22, 2026
- Genre: Metroidvania
- Mode: Single-player

Well Dweller is a 2026 Metroidvania video game developed independently by Kyle Thompson and published by Top Hat Studios. The player controls Glimmer, a small bird armed with a lit matchstick, who sets out from the bottom of a well to kill the queen of a decaying kingdom and rescue his siblings. It was released on September 22, 2026 for Windows, Nintendo Switch, Nintendo Switch 2, PlayStation 5 and Xbox Series X/S, and was available through Xbox Game Pass on launch day.

It is Thompson's fourth game, following Sheepo, Islets and Crypt Custodian. The game received acclaim from critics, ranking among the highest-rated releases of 2026 on review aggregators.

== Gameplay ==
Well Dweller is a side-scrolling Metroidvania in which the player explores an interconnected, hand-drawn kingdom and unlocks abilities that open previously inaccessible arenas. Glimmer's matchstick serves as both his weapon and a light source in dark areas. More abilities can be acquired over the course of the game, including throwing the matchstick to create a temporary springboard platform.

Trinkets can be bought from a merchant to upgrade Glimmer's abilities and can be mixed and matched to alter play style. Optional content includes self-contained platforming sequences, time trials, and no-hit combat challenges that award currency, along with illustrated lore pages that expand on the kingdom's history. The map can display optional markers pointing to story objectives and remaining collectibles.

== Premise ==
Glimmer is a small bird living at the bottom of a well in a forest within a rotting queendom. After his siblings are seized from their nest by a hunter working for the kingdom's wicked queen, who intends to make them part of her royal gown, Glimmer arms himself with a matchstick, and sets out to reach the queen's quarters and kill her. Along the way, he befriends the animals and other creatures living in the kingdom's underbelly, among them Ilda, a mouse on the run from the queen, and Looter, a scavenger who roams the kingdom for goods to steal.

== Development and release ==
Kyle Thompson is a solo independent developer whose previous games, Sheepo (2020), Islets (2022) and Crypt Custodian (2024), were also published by Top Hat Studios. After Crypt Custodian moved the formula to a top-down view, Well Dweller returns to a 2D side-scrolling presentation. The game uses a hand-drawn art style modeled on medieval fairy-tale illustration. Thompson's brother Eric returned from his previous three games as the composer for Well Dweller.

Well Dweller was revealed during Nintendo's Indie World Showcase on August 7, 2025, initially for Nintendo Switch and PC with a 2026 release window. A free demo was later released on Steam. On August 24, 2026, Top Hat Studios announced a September 22 release date and confirmed additional versions for PlayStation 5, Xbox Series X/S and Nintendo Switch 2, along with day-one availability on Xbox Game Pass. The game launched on all five platforms as announced, and on PC through both Steam and GOG.com.

== Reception ==
Reception

Aggregate scores
Aggregator	Score
Metacritic	PC: 91/100; NS: 89/100; PS5: 88/100; XSXS: 86/100
OpenCritic	94% recommend

Review scores
Publication	Score
Console Creatures	10/10
Cubed3	9/10
Hardcore Gamer	9/10
IGN Spain	9/10
Gamer Guides	84/100
The GameSlayer	9/10

Well Dweller received "universal acclaim" for its Windows version according to Metacritic, which assigned it 91 out of 100 based on seven critic reviews; the Switch, PlayStation 5 and Xbox Series X/S versions scored 89, 88, and 86 respectively. On OpenCritic the game holds a "Mighty" rating with a Top Critic Average of 90 and a 94% recommendation, placing it in the site's 99th percentile. Several outlets noted that the game, which had a comparatively low profile before launch, had become one of the best-reviewed releases of 2026. It also debuted to a near-unanimous user score on Steam.

Critics consistently praised the world design, art and characters. David Pietrangelo of Console Creatures scored the game 10 out of 10, calling it an all-time great in the genre and highlighting its emotionally charged story and the volume of characters to discover. Hardcore Gamer described it as a fantastic traditional Metroidvania, drawing particular attention to the contrast between its bleak biomes and the resilient good humour of the animal cast living among the ruins of the human world. Mario Seijas of IGN Spain praised the level design and the combination of dark fantasy with fable, while Carl Dexter of Cubed3 credited the game's tools with making completion far less cryptic than is usual in the genre.

Reviewers who were more reserved pointed to a lack of originality and a gentle difficulty curve. Josh Bailey of Gamer Guides scored it 84 out of 100, and considered the game polished and charming but short on new ideas.
