= Fast Racing League =

2011 video game

- Developer: Shin'en Multimedia
- Publisher: Shin'en Multimedia
- Series: Fast
- Platform: Wii
- Release: EU: 27 May 2011; NA: 30 May 2011
- Genre: Racing
- Modes: Single-player, multiplayer

Fast Racing League (stylized as FAST Racing League) is a racing game developed and published by Shin'en Multimedia for the Wii. Released on the WiiWare service in May 2011, it is the first installment in the Fast series, which would become Shin'en Multimedia's trademark series. Three sequels were released, Fast Racing Neo for the Wii U, Fast RMX for the Nintendo Switch, and Fast Fusion for the Nintendo Switch 2; the latter two were launch titles for their respective consoles.

== Gameplay ==
Fast Racing League is a fast-paced, futuristic racing game, often compared to F-Zero and Wipeout. However, unlike other racing games, it features a "phase shift mechanic" which allows the player to switch their vehicle between light and dark phases. These can be used to take advantage of colored pads on the track to boost the player's speed or launch the vehicle into the air, which only work if the vehicle is the same color. The player must collect energy orbs scattered across the track to fill their energy meter, which allows them to switch phases, adding extra challenge to the game. If the player attempts to drive over a boost pad of the opposite color, their vehicle will be drastically slowed down.

Before being able to play the main game, the player must complete the "qualification," a tutorial level in which there are no opponents and the player learns the game with the help of informational objectives displayed on-screen. Once this level has been completed, the player unlocks the ability to play single-player and multiplayer games with AI vehicles.

The game features multiple vehicles, which can be obtained by winning races between 3 classes (neutron, proton, and ion), which serve as different difficulty settings and take place in 3 leagues (Shima, Siberia, and Sunahara). Each league is further divided into races. These leagues must be unlocked for each class by completing the previous one.

The player begins with two vehicles: Ajia X and K-Rokoku. Each car has different weight, velocity, and acceleration stats, tailoring them to different playstyles. Heavier vehicles control more easily on ice. Ice will make the vehicle slide around, and the player must over-steer to prevent falling off the track.

Levels frequently include upside-down loops and tight corners. Ramming into a wall at high speed or falling off the track will result in a crash, where the player must wait several seconds before respawning.

Players can assign a Mii to their save file, allowing their real name to appear on the in-game scoreboard. The game supports motion controls by holding the Wii Remote sideways, as well as the Classic Controller and the Nunchuk.

== Reception ==
Reception

Aggregate score
Aggregator	Score
Metacritic	73%

Review scores
Publication	Score
Eurogamer	6/10
Nintendo Life	9/10

Fast Racing League received "average" reviews according to the review aggregation website Metacritic. Nintendo Life's Marcel van Duyn called it "another success for Shin'en," and an "amazing accomplishment for WiiWare graphic-wise." Kristan Reed of Eurogamer praised the game's graphics, particularly noting its sense of speed and smooth performance. However, he criticized the AI of opponents, which he found unfairly difficult, declaring that they "appear immune to even the slightest error."
