= The Touryst =

2019 video game

- Developer: Shin'en Multimedia
- Publisher: Shin'en Multimedia
- Platforms: Nintendo Switch; Windows; Xbox One; Xbox Series X/S; PlayStation 4; PlayStation 5; Nintendo Switch 2
- Release: Nintendo Switch; 21 November 2019; Windows, Xbox One; 30 July 2020; Xbox Series X/S; 10 November 2020; PS4, PS5; 9 September 2021; Nintendo Switch 2; 25 September 2025
- Genre: Action-adventure
- Mode: Single-player

The Touryst is a 2019 action-adventure video game developed and published by Shin'en Multimedia for the Nintendo Switch. The game follows a tourist as he investigates numerous monuments on various islands. The game utilizes voxel art techniques to form a style reminiscent of realistic yet blocky visuals. A proprietary engine was developed for the game to allow high-fidelity graphical effects while still maintaining a smooth frame rate.

The Touryst received positive reviews from critics, with praise for its gameplay and design. Ports were released for Windows and Xbox One on 30 July 2020, with an enhanced version of the game released for Xbox Series X/S as a launch title on 10 November 2020; it was the first game to be released by Shin'en on these platforms. PlayStation 4 and PlayStation 5 versions were released on 9 September 2021. A Nintendo Switch 2 version with additional content, called The Touryst: Deluxe, was released on 25 September 2025.

== Gameplay ==
The player controls a tourist as he is tasked with exploring numerous islands near Touryst Island, his destination, to uncover the world's secrets. The tourist can perform a basic jump to navigate obstacles, later being expanded to a double jump and sprinting which can break walls. While he can explore the islands to his liking and interact with its denizens, his objective is to investigate numerous monuments on the islands, where puzzles must be solved for the player to continue forward.

== Development ==
While working on Fast RMX, the development team wanted to create an adventure game based around the concept of strange things happening on a vacation. The gameplay was designed so that the player could choose to play the activities that interested them. The voxel visual style was inspired by NES and SNES games, but in 3D environments. Shin'en used the voxel editor Magicavoxel to create the game's models, which were then imported into Maya. The game was designed with Shin'en's in-house engine, allowing the developers to focus on optimizing for a smooth framerate. Development on the game took around three years to complete.

=== The Touryst: Deluxe ===
The Touryst: Deluxe was announced for the Nintendo Switch 2 on August 18, 2025. It features new content, including an additional playable area, new items and quest, and improved visuals. It was released on 25 September 2025.

== Reception ==
Reception

Aggregate score
Aggregator	Score
Metacritic	XONE: 84/100; NS: 79/100

Review scores
Publication	Score
Destructoid	7.5/10
Edge	7/10
GameSpot	8/10
Nintendo Life	9/10

The Touryst received "generally favourable reviews" for the Nintendo Switch and Xbox One versions, according to review aggregator website Metacritic.
