= Jett Rocket =

2010 video game

- Developer: Shin'en Multimedia
- Publisher: Shin'en Multimedia
- Platform: Wii
- Release: NA: 28 June 2010; EU: 2 July 2010
- Genre: Platform
- Mode: Single-player

Jett Rocket is a 2010 platform video game developed and published by Shin'en Multimedia for the Wii. It was released on the WiiWare service on 28 June 2010 in North America and in Europe on 2 July 2010 for 1000 Nintendo Points. On 24 November 2010, a demo of Jett Rocket was made available for free on the Wii Shop Channel. A sequel, Jett Rocket II: The Wrath of Taikai, was released for the Nintendo 3DS in 2013.

== Gameplay ==
The player takes on the role of the eponymous Jett Rocket, a planetary inspector who is tasked with stopping the Power Plant Posse (PPP) from polluting the Earthlike planet Yoroppa. The objective is to clear each stage within the planet's three areas: the lush and tropical Atoll, the glacial and snowy Northpole, and the toxic and junglelike Swamps. Within each stage lies a set number of solar cells, many of which are scattered about and some of which are hidden, that Jett must collect in order to unlock each stage and gain access to the subsequent areas. Additionally, Jett must defeat a general of the PPP at the end of each area. As with standard platforming games, Jett is capable of jumping, but can briefly hover when using his jet pack. Within certain stages, he can also paraglide as well as either ride a hoverboard or a jetboat. In addition, Jett can defeat enemies, clear obstacles and activate switches with his "Dash" attack, which can be executed by shaking the Wii Remote while he is standing (which sees him perform a somersaulting tackle) or after a jump (which sees him perform a diving hammer fist). The game also features an achievement system that can be completed either during or after completion of the main story.

== Reception ==
Jett Rocket has been met with mostly positive reception. Cubed3 noted the game as "a clear contender for WiiWare Game of the Year, if not 2010's best Wii game in general". Wiiloveit.com spoke very highly of it as well, giving it a 28/30 and claiming that it "knocked Lostwinds off its high horse." However, it was commented that a Time Attack mode of some kind would add much replay value to the eventual sequel. Jett Rocket has received a Metacritic score of 70, indicating mixed or average reviews.

== Sequel ==
A potential sequel was first mentioned in May 2011 and was later confirmed on 13 December 2011 as Jett Rocket Super Surf for the Nintendo 3DS eShop. On 15 January 2013, the sequel was renamed to Jett Rocket II: The Wrath of Taikai. After the game's website went live on 1 March, screenshots of the game were released later that month and a teaser trailer for the game was uploaded on 16 April. On 1 May, Shin'en Multimedia announced that the game would be delayed for a Q3 release in order to add additional 3D free-roaming levels while reiterating that the game would still run at 60 frames per second and also releasing more screenshots in August. After being submitted to the 3DS' eShop in late August, Jett Rocket II: The Wrath of Taikai was finally released on 13 November 2013.
