= Deep Sleep =

Click-and-point video game series

- Genre: Graphic adventure game
- Developer: Mateusz Sokalszczuk
- Publisher: Armor Games
- Platform: Web browser
- First release: Deep Sleep; 2012
- Latest release: Deep Sleep: Labyrinth of the Forsaken; 2025

Deep Sleep is a series of point-and-click adventure games created by Polish indie developer Mateusz Sokalszczuk (also known by his online name scriptwelder). The series consists of three free browser games in which the player attempts to navigate and eventually escape a dream world inhabited by shadow people. The first game, Deep Sleep, was designed for and won first place in the 2012 Jay Is Games Casual Gameplay Design Competition. Connections between scriptwelder's Deep Sleep and Don't Escape series were hinted at throughout each, with a much deeper connection being established with the release of Don't Escape: 4 Days to Survive. Ties between these series and the fictional company Sidereal Plexus have been referred to as the "scriptwelder multiverse".

== Plot ==
=== Deep Sleep (2012) ===
Interested in lucid dreams, an unseen researcher constructs a world in his mind to explore. However, the world in his dream quickly turns nightmarish, and the researcher becomes trapped. Prompted by a phone call from an unknown source, the researcher must "wake up" and to look for a lighthouse that somehow leads to freedom. Shadowy figures haunt this world and attempt to capture him. In order to advance, he unlocks doors through the building they're trapped in. A dark room in a long hallway contains multiple news clippings informing the researcher of mysterious events that imply he's far from the only one to have ventured into this nightmare realm. Near the end of the game, shadowy figures start to appear and will advance towards the researcher. He has to escape the figures, as they cannot be killed. The researcher eventually reaches the lighthouse, but is cornered by the shadow figures after restoring the lighthouse lamp. He then turns the light on the shadows, seemingly banishing them. The game then ends, as the player "wakes up". However, the researcher remains curious about the Shadow Figures and declares that he wants to visit them again.

=== Deeper Sleep (2013) ===
Following the events of the previous game, the protagonist develops an obsession over the previously-encountered shadow people, and begins to worry that they may be real entities. While seeking information at the library, the world begins to degrade around them, revealing that they have already returned to the dream world. Much of the gameplay is similar to that of the previous game, as the player navigates various rooms and buildings and utilizes various items to advance through the game. A torn book page, slowly reassembled over the course of the game, give more insight into the nature of the Shadow People, which are described as ancient otherworldly entities that exist only in the dream world and desire to escape into the real world by possessing the uninhabited bodies of people stuck in comas or lucid dreams. Such people who enter this realm this way are referred to as Travelers. Another Traveler can be encountered mid-way through the adventure, and is revealed to be the source of the mysterious phone call from the first game. They explain that the protagonist is a fool for returning and informs him that he has descended too far down to re-ascend like last time, and must hit the bottom in order to "bounce" back to the waking realm. Towards the end of the game, the player descends down a water well and, trapped by Shadow People above him, enters a tunnel. He encounters two eye-like orbs of light in the darkness in the tunnel. The game then ends, and a newspaper article is shown, revealing that a young boy named Cody (whom the player had previously given a tiger plushie) had baffled doctors by awakening from a three-month coma, indicating that the player's action in the dream world can have consequences in the real world.

=== The Deepest Sleep (2014) ===
Picking up at a different point in time from the previous game, the player awakens in their bed, immobile, and sees a shadowy figure in their room, which briefly attacks before vanishing. The player then fully "awakens" and exits their room, only to discover that they are still in the dream world and resume their attempts at escaping. After finding various items and proceeding through various rooms, the player enters a series of underground sewers and tunnels, inhabited by massive dream world predators known as "bottom feeders" that the player must evade. Upon escaping the sewer system, the player enters a room explored in a previous game, where they discover that their uninhabited body had become possessed when they descended into the well, and they are now a Shadow Person themselves. Upon facing this realization, the player encounters another Traveler through the dream realm, who begins to flee. The player is then given the option to either let the Traveler escape unharmed and remain trapped in the dream realm, or possess the Traveler's body and leave them doomed as a Shadow Person. It is heavily implied that this person is in fact the same person as the protagonist in the first game, and later games developed by scriptwelder would suggest that this Traveler is the same person but from a parallel universe.

=== Deep Sleep: Labyrinth of the Forsaken (2025) ===
The main character in the game is Amy, a woman who after the death of her brother Thomas (the nameless Traveler from the previous three games) takes up residence in his apartment. Believing her brother to somehow still exist in the world of dreams, which he had an unhealthy obsession with, she uses a machine from Sidereal Plexus to explore the dream world every night.

In her quest, she meets Tutu, a guardian, who knew her brother well. She also encounters other travelers such as the journalist Joshua, a mysterious traveler who knew her brother, and the scientist Dr. Shulzer. But she also runs into a large number of nightmarish creatures, including the dreaded Night-Folk. All leading to a confrontation with her brother, who has been corrupted by the Night-Folk.

== Reception ==
Deep Sleep received mostly positive reviews. Adam Smith of Rock, Paper, Shotgun wrote that although the game has a minimalist story, it "relies on mood rather than jump scares to unsettle". Cassandra Khaw of Indiegames.com called it "creepy without being overdone". Steve Brown of Adventure Gamers called it "a truly disturbing experience".

Both sequels received similarly positive reception, with Jay Is Games calling Deeper Sleep a "chilling, wonderfully creepy game that will make the hair on your arms stand on end, and you'll wind up eager for more" and PC Gamer including Deepest Sleep in its "best free games of the week" for August 2, 2014.
