= This is the Only Level =

Single level video game

- The title screen of This is the Only Level
- Developer: John Cooney
- Release: August 8, 2009
- Genre: Metagame
- Mode: Single-player

This is the Only Level is a 2009 meta Flash game developed by John Cooney (also known as jmtb02) and published by Armor Games. The title of the game is a literal description of the game - the whole game takes place in a single level the player has to play over and over again, albeit with several game-changing variations as the game progresses. The game has received an (unofficial) port to PICO-8. Cooney also released two sequels to the game, This is the Only Level Too and This is the Only Level 3. All three games were included in The Elephant Collection, a compilation of 10 games by Cooney that was released in 2023. The game was included on a list of "10 Flash Games That Pushed the Limits of the Genre" in a 2021 Screen Rant listicle.

== See also ==
- Achievement Unlocked
