= Never Give Up =

Never Give Up may refer to:

== Film and television ==
- Never Give Up (1934 film), a Chinese film of the 1930s
- Never Give Up (1978 film), a Japanese film
- Never Give Up: The 20th Century Odyssey of Herbert Zipper, a 1995 documentary film
- Vai na Fé, a 2023 Brazilian telenovela, also titled Never Give Up

== Songs ==
- "Never Give Up" (Sia song), 2016
- "Never Give Up" (Maria Sur song), 2023
- "Never Give Up (Party Party)", by Paul Haig, 1983
- "Never Give Up", by A. R. Rahman from the Million Dollar Arm film soundtrack, 2014
- "Never Give Up", by Barbra Streisand from Guilty, 1980
- "Never Give Up", by Fantastic Negrito from Please Don't Be Dead, 2018
- "Never Give Up", by Jodi Benson and Samuel E. Wright from the TV series The Little Mermaid, 1993
- "Never Give Up", by Keke Wyatt from Who Knew?, 2010
- "Never Give Up", by New Found Glory from Sticks and Stones, 2002
- "Never Give Up", by Rage from Gib dich nie auf, 2009
- "Never Give Up", by Yolanda Adams from Believe, 2001

== Other uses ==
- Never Give Up (video game), a 2019 2D platform game
- Never Give Up!, a 1999 Japanese comic for girls by Hiromu Mutou
- Never Give Up: My Stroke, My Recovery, and My Return to the NFL, a 2007 book by Tedy Bruschi
- Never Give Up: How I Turned My Biggest Challenges into Success, a 2008 book by Donald Trump

== See also ==
- "Never Givin' Up", a 1998 song by Rick Tippe
- "Never Giving Up", a song by Of Mice & Men from Restoring Force: Full Circle
