= John Cooney =

John Cooney may refer to:

- Johnny Cooney (1901–1986), American baseball player
- John Cooney (boxer) (1996–2025), Irish boxer
- John Cooney (politician) (1836–1894), American lawyer and politician from New York
- John Cooney (rugby union) (born 1990), Irish rugby union player
- John Cooney (video game developer), American game designer from Sacramento
