= Nano Assault =

2011 video game

- North American box art for the original version
- Developer: Shin'en Multimedia
- Publishers: Majesco; Shin'en Multimedia (EX)
- Platform: Nintendo 3DS
- Release: NA: 5 December 2011; Nano Assault EX: NA/EU: 7 March 2013; AU: 2 February 2016
- Genre: Shoot 'em up
- Mode: Single-player

Nano Assault is a 2011 shoot 'em up video game developed by Shin'en Multimedia and published by Majesco for the Nintendo 3DS. It is the spiritual successor to the Nintendo DS games Nanostray and Nanostray 2.

In March 2013, Shin'en Multimedia published an enhanced version entitled Nano Assault EX, with visual improvements and additional gameplay features on the Nintendo eShop.

== Gameplay ==
Here, the player-controlled navigates through a cell to eliminate foes.

Players blast their way through 32 twisted cell stages and dark worlds with rugged landscapes that adjust in difficulty based on the player's skill level.

== Reception ==
=== Nano Assault ===
Nano Assault

Aggregate score
Aggregator	Score
Metacritic	75/100

Review scores
Publication	Score
GamesRadar+	3/5
NGamer	75%
Nintendo Life	8/10
Nintendo Power	7/10
Nintendo World Report	8.5/10

Nano Assault received "generally favourable reviews" according to the review aggregation website Metacritic.

=== Nano Assault EX ===
Nano Assault EX

Aggregate score
Aggregator	Score
Metacritic	74/100

Review scores
Publication	Score
4Players	68%
GamesMaster	62%
Nintendo Life	9/10
Nintendo World Report	8.5/10
Official Nintendo Magazine	62%
Pocket Gamer	4/5
Digital Spy	3/5

Nano Assault EX received "mixed or average reviews" according to Metacritic.
