= Achievement Unlocked =

2008 video game

- The title screen of Achievement Unlocked
- Developer: John Cooney
- Engine: Adobe Flash
- Platform: Web browser
- Release: December 17, 2008
- Genre: Platform
- Mode: Single-player

Achievement Unlocked is an Adobe Flash video game written by John Cooney and published by Armor Games in 2008. In the game, the player controls a blue elephant who moves and jumps around a level with the goal of completing all 100 achievements. These achievements include finding hidden numbers, dying, or even doing nothing for a period of time.

The game has been recognized as commentary on "meaningless rewards" in video games and was featured in multiple books about must-play indie games. Two sequels, named Achievement Unlocked 2 and Achievement Unlocked 3, were released in 2010 and 2012 respectively.

== Gameplay ==
While essentially a platform game, it has been referred to as a metagame as well as an "antigame". The game is a send-up of in-game achievements, still a relatively new concept at the release of the game. While a video game achievement is usually a meta-goal defined outside a game's parameters, they are the only goal of the game in Achievement Unlocked.

Achievement Unlocked takes place on a single screen, with various objects such as spikes and lifts. These elements (among others) have to be interacted with in order to get all the achievements. For example, dying to the spikes, touching the hidden numbers in a specific order, and even doing nothing for a certain amount of time are all achievements in game.

== Development ==
Achievement Unlocked was developed by Cooney in four days. It was published by Armor Games and placed onto various Flash game websites over time.

== Reception ==
It has been described as a "commentary on the proliferation of nearly meaningless rewards in games" and was featured in the books 250 Indie Games You Must Play by Mike Rose and The Game Designer's Playlist: Innovative Games Every Game Designer Needs to Play by Zack Hiwiller. Escapist writer John Funk questioned whether it was ironic to enjoy collecting achievements in a game meant to lambast that mindset.

== See also ==
- This is the Only Level, a similar game by Cooney
