= Iridion 3D =

2001 video game

- Developer: Shin'en Multimedia
- Publishers: NA: Majesco; EU: Interplay Entertainment
- Platforms: Game Boy Advance, Windows
- Release: Game Boy Advance: NA: June 11, 2001; EU: September 21, 2001; Windows; April 8, 2020
- Genre: Rail shooter
- Mode: Single player

Iridion 3D is a rail shooter video game developed by Shin'en Multimedia. A launch title for the Game Boy Advance portable game console, it was released in North America on June 11, 2001 and in Europe on September 21. The player controls a single starship defending Earth from the alien Iridion. The quasi-3D game spans seven levels from Earth to the aliens' home planet, each following a linear path that culminate with a boss.

Iridion began development as a shooter for the Game Boy Color; when Shin'en decided to drop development and shift their focus to the Game Boy Advance, Iridion was the first game by the developer to appear on the system. Though billed as a 3D game, Shin'en used realtime encoding and resizing to manipulate the size of 2D sprites instead of creating a true 3D environment. More room on the game cartridge was available for graphics due to the game's use of the GAX Sound Engine, which allowed real-time decoding of song data in a small file size.

On release Iridion garnered generally mixed reviews. The graphics and sound were generally praised; a year after its release, critics at Extended Play still considered it the best-looking game on the platform. In contrast, critics derided the game's repetitive and frustrating gameplay. Despite lukewarm reception to the title upon release, Iridion 3D was a financial success, and influenced future Shin'en shooters such as Iridion II and Nanostray.

== Gameplay ==
Bosses usually have a single vulnerability—here, the green core. The number of lives remaining, score, and ship energy are shown along the top of the screen.

Iridion 3D is a forward-scrolling rail shooter, similar to the Star Fox series. Only the Game Boy Advance's directional pad, A, and Start buttons are used during gameplay. The ship remains locked at a set speed and cannot accelerate or brake.

The player encounters more than fifteen types of enemy, not including level bosses. Some are easy to destroy; others, including fire creatures found on the Iridion home world, are indestructible and must be avoided. Other enemies prevent the player from dodging enemy fire by laying mines to block paths. Passive objects, such as garbage or asteroids, can damage or destroy the player's craft. Enemies vary in armor and weaponry—some cannot return fire but travel in waves to ram the player. The player's ship can use five types of weapons, with three levels of power each. Players boost weapon power by collecting powerups that match the current weapon's power; collecting a different color gives the player the first level of that weapon type. If the player's ship is destroyed the power level of the weapon is reduced by one. Flashing powerups restore the craft's shields.

Each level has the player follow a linear path through waves of enemies and culminates with a boss. In boss stages the player's craft does not move forward, but hovers in front of the boss. Each boss has a single vulnerability which flashes when hit. These areas are often heavily shielded and must be hit repeatedly to remove armor. Other bosses' vulnerabilities are hidden and appear for only short periods. Most bosses have weapons that fire upon the player or reflect the player's shots. At the end of each level, players receive bonuses for defeated enemies, lives remaining, and the energy level of the player's craft. An extra life is granted if the score reaches certain thresholds.

== Plot ==
In the opening cinematic of Iridion 3D Earth is attacked without warning by the Iridion, who take over much of the surface and lay mines in orbit and bombs in the Pacific Ocean. The player is the pilot of an experimental SHN fighter, the last hope for defending Earth from the Iridion. The player pilots his ship alone against hordes of Iridion fighters and natural obstacles. The early stages begin on Earth, with the player fighting through an Iridion garbage tunnel. The player proceeds to the Pacific Ocean and destroys much of the Iridion invasion fleet on Earth before heading into the stratosphere to destroy the orbital blockade around Earth and subsequently annihilating the Iridion boss at the Moon.

With the invasion fleet in ruins, the player heads into the far reaches of space. After destroying an Iridion mining colony within an asteroid belt, the player proceeds into the Iridion home system. Eventually the player fights the Iridion on their home world, destroying the Iridion "mainframe" and ending the alien threat forever.

== Development ==
Manfred Linzner began developing a shoot-em-up video game in 1996 on his Amiga computer, but abandoned the project after producing a single level and some related music. Linzner later co-founded Shin'en Multimedia in 1999, and Iridion began development as a shooter for the Game Boy Color. On January 10, 2001, Shin'en announced they would stop making games for the Color, instead working on games exclusively for the upcoming Game Boy Advance. Iridion's executive producer was Dan Kitchen, a former programmer for Atari.

Although advertised as a 3D game, Iridion 3D uses solely 2D graphics for texture scrolling and sprites which depict explosions and enemies. The developers created the illusion of 3D by looping background textures—a graphically intensive technique for the Game Boy Advance. Graphical objects shrink or enlarge to depict position relative to the player. Level environments feature changes such as progression from day to night. Kitchen, Majesco's vice president of handhelds, wrote that "by pushing the graphics hardware of the Game Boy Advance to its technical limits, Iridion 3D provides a truly realistic 3D gaming experience." He hoped that players would be impressed by the capabilities of a game on a portable system.

Linzner composed Iridion 3D's music. Some of the music had been started before programming of the game itself. The game was Shin'en's first product to utilize the GAX Sound Engine, which allowed real-time decoding of song data in an extremely small file size; this allowed more space on the cartridge to be used for graphics. The soundtrack was released as part of an arranged collection on compact disc in 2003 and digitally in 2010.

By March 2001, the GBA version of Iridion was shown in workable form. IGN saw early screens and declared that Iridion was "aiming to set the standard" of what Game Boy Advance shooters should be, pushing the platform to its limits and producing the most stunning game seen at the time for the handheld system. GameSpot's Ben Stahl noted the excellent graphics and high frame rate, ending with, "At this point, Iridion 3D looks like it could be a great game for fans of the genre." The game was one of 17 titles that launched alongside the Advance.

== Reception ==
Reception

Aggregate score
Aggregator	Score
Metacritic	53/100

Review scores
Publication	Score
AllGame	2/5
Edge	6/10
Electronic Gaming Monthly	5.5/10, 2/10, 6/10 (Note: Three critics of Electronic Gaming Monthly each gave a score out of a possible ten.)
EP Daily	6/10
Game Informer	6/10
GameSpot	5.6/10
GameSpy	45%
IGN	5.5/10
Nintendo Power	3.5/5
X-Play	3/5

Iridion 3D received mixed reviews according to the review aggregation website Metacritic. The graphics were often praised; reviews from The Washington Post, Popular Science, and GameSpy considered Iridion 3D a standout game for the Game Boy Advance and a showcase for the system's graphic performance. A year after its release, Extended Play's Miguel Concepcion argued that Iridion remained the best-looking game for the system. Miguel Lopez of GameSpot wrote that "while it's ultimately all smoke and mirrors, Iridion's world is richly detailed, has remarkable depth, and is unbelievably fluid. It's often hard to tell if the game's backgrounds are composed of streaming full motion video or just some really fancy math-powered 2D bitmaps." Less positively, Aaron Curtiss of the Los Angeles Times wrote that the faux-3D visuals of Iridion were a letdown compared to true 3D games like F-Zero: Maximum Velocity.

In contrast to praise for Iridion's graphics, its gameplay was generally panned. IGN's Craig Harris wrote that the shooter would only impress for its visual presentation, and noted that player's freedom of movement was limited. Concepcion complained that on a small screen distances were hard to judge and the player's ship was often hit by bullets that appeared to be in the distance. GameSpy's Andrew S. Bub and Game Informer's Jay Fitzloff criticized the craft placement, as the player's view was often obscured by their own ship. Critics observed that Iridion's replay value was low, with enemies appearing in the same set sequences across all levels, while Curtiss wrote that the changing environments helped keep the game interesting. Electronic Gaming Monthly's reviewers called the gameplay barebones and rote, and AllGame's Skyler Miller called Iridion 3D nothing more than a technology demo. A more positive review came from GamePro, whose reviewer summed up his experience by writing that, "if you're looking for some classic shooter action on your new GBA, Iridion 3D will fit the bill nicely without blowing you away." (Note: GamePro gave the game three 4/5 scores for graphics, control, and fun factor, and 3.5/5 for sound.)

The sound design and music received praise. Cindi Lash of the Post-Gazette praised the soundtrack as demonstrating the promise of the Game Boy's hardware to leave "tinny carousel-like tunes" in the past. WiredLounge.com said that "The soundtrack is an instant classic, maybe even one of the best shooter scores ever." Concepcion noted that the game's mood-fitting "high-energy techno" was an oddity coming from a German game company.

Among the launch titles for the Game Boy Advance, Iridion was often considered one of the weaker offerings. Despite the reviews, Linzner maintained that Iridion 3D was the best-selling game for the Game Boy Advance without licensed characters. Iridion 3D was one of the more successful third-party titles on the Game Boy Advance, paving the way for a sequel. Shin'en followed the game with Iridion II in 2003 and Nanostray in 2005. Iridion 3D was released on Steam on April 8, 2020, alongside Iridion II.
