= Warfare 1917 =

2008 video game

- Developer: ConArtist
- Publisher: Armor Games
- Programmer: ConArtist
- Platform: Flash
- Release: September 19, 2008 (Browser); Legacy Collection; April 28, 2025 (Steam)
- Genre: Strategy
- Mode: Single-player

Warfare 1917 is a strategy Flash game set during World War I, developed by Australian programmer ConArtist and published by Armor Games.

On 28 April 2025, the game was released and remastered on Steam under Warfare Legacy Collection which includes the sequel and its spin-off campaign.

== Gameplay ==
In Warfare 1917, the player orders soldiers to capture ground and trenches while fighting programmed enemies. In-game units such as the riflemen, machine gunners, assaulters, officers, sharpshooters, and tanks can be used in both the British and German campaigns and custom mode. Support weapons can also be called down upon command, such as artillery, mortar, and mustard gas, but, like other units, must load up first. The game also allows users to set up custom levels.

During either campaign, the player may make use of the nation-specific variants of several units, which are based on actual historical differences between each army. Specialized units enjoy a higher combat proficiency than the standard for that unit, and provide a unique strategic advantage to the player throughout their campaign. Such would include the Sturmtruppen and the Mark IV Tank, among others. The campaigns also provide a historical atmosphere by slowly expanding the player's unit roster over the course of the war based on the historical innovations of the featured armies; regardless of affiliation, the player starts the game with limited options, and unlock new units and fire support with every battle they win, tanks being among the last and available to the British before the Germans.

Regardless of game mode, the player is tasked with achieving victory in one of two ways: capturing enough of the enemy's side of the battlefield, or killing off enough enemy units to deplete morale and force a surrender. The criteria for the AI opponent's victory is the same as the player's; should the player fail to stop the advance of opposing troops, or have their army's morale drop to 0%, the AI will win the battle.

== Reception ==
The game generally garnered favorable reviews. The game was given a score of 4.57/5 in Newgrounds.

== Sequel ==
Warfare 1944, a sequel to the game, was later released by ConArtist, featuring the Americans and Germans in the Second World War.
