= In Stars and Time =

2023 video game

- Developer: Insertdisc5
- Publisher: Armor Games Studios
- Director: Adrienne Bazir
- Designer: Adrienne Bazir
- Programmers: Adrienne Bazir; Isabella Ava
- Artist: Adrienne Bazir
- Writer: Adrienne Bazir
- Composer: Studio Thumpy Puppy
- Engine: RPG Maker MV
- Platforms: Nintendo Switch; PlayStation 4; PlayStation 5; Windows
- Release: WW: November 20, 2023
- Genre: Role-playing
- Mode: Single-player

In Stars and Time is a 2023 role-playing video game developed by French and Canadian game developer and cartoonist Adrienne Bazir, under the pseudonym Insertdisc5, and published by Armor Games Studios. The game takes place in the fictional country of Vaugarde, which is in the process of being frozen in time by a mysterious figure known as the King. The player controls Siffrin, a member of an adventuring party which hopes to defeat the King and save Vaugarde. Siffrin finds himself (Note: In the game, Siffrin is referred to using both he/him and they/them. For consistency, this article will use he/him pronouns.) trapped in a time loop, which the player can manipulate to solve problems. The game features a turn-based combat system which is based on a rock paper scissors formula. It originated as a webcomic series in 2018, and was preceded by the prologue Start Again in 2020. In Stars and Time was released in 2023 for Windows and several consoles. Critics were generally positive towards the game, praising the characters and narrative, though some took issue with the looping gameplay. Following release, it received honorable mentions for the Nuovo Award and Seumas McNally Grand Prize at the 2024 Independent Games Festival.

== Gameplay ==
In Stars and Time's battle system allows players to perform combos based on move types (denoted in the bottom right).

In Stars and Time is a role-playing game that is viewed from a top-down perspective. Players control the main character Siffrin as he attempts to lead the party through the castle and defeat the King. The party navigates the House of Change and its surrounding village, where the player can initiate combat with enemies or interact with items and characters.

Combat takes place in a first-person perspective; the game uses an active-time battle system. Different characters have specialised types based on a rock paper scissors system, though they can also use attacks outside their speciality. Enemies also have these types, which are usually indicated via their hand gestures. When the party performs five consecutive attacks of a type, a "jackpot" move is performed. These special group attacks can heal party members and deal damage to all enemies.

Throughout the game, the player can end up repeating the same actions multiple times, as Siffrin is stuck in a time loop. However, they can also utilise the loops to learn how to solve problems, for example repeating conversations until they choose the correct option or find a certain item. Loops are generally only terminated when Siffrin dies; this can either be during combat, or by finding items that kill Siffrin. After looping back in time, the player can skip ahead to different floors, at the cost of in-game currency. If the player encounters dialogue they have already seen, they can fast-forward through it.

== Plot ==
The player assumes control of Siffrin, who is leading his party from the town of Dormont to the House of Change. The House has been taken over by the King, who will perpetually freeze the country of Vaugarde in time if they fail to stop him. Siffrin is quickly killed by a trap after entering the House, but finds himself waking up in Dormont the day before, unharmed. After waking up, he is informed by a mysterious, star-shaped figure named Loop that he has been trapped in a time loop. Choosing not to tell his party, Siffrin uses his time loops and Loop's assistance to defeat the King and save Vaugarde. However, he soon discovers that he also gets looped back after defeating the King; Loop assures him that they will help him escape the situation.

Siffrin uses the loops to find out more about his situation and discover a way out. Over the course of many loops, he learns that both he and the King come from a country that was erased from everyone's memory. Distraught by losing his memories, the King arrived in Vaugarde and was overjoyed by the compassion he was shown. To protect Vaugarde from meeting the same fate as his country, he chose to freeze it in time to preserve it so that it would remain "perfect". Siffrin discovers that the King has harnessed the rare powers of Wish Craft, which is capable of granting anyone's deepest wish.

While making these discoveries, Siffrin grows closer to his party members by working through their personal problems, and he begins to consider them his new family. This worsens his mental stability, as he watches his party forget their experiences with him at the start of each loop, and he eventually views them as actors repeating lines in a play, as well as occasionally describing his circumstances through dramaturgical metaphor. He comes to believe that the citizens of Dormont unintentionally trapped him in the loop due to Wish Craft, but fails to get help. Out of leads, impatient, and worn down by experiencing a vast amount of loops, Siffrin snaps and insults his party, before leaving to confront the King by himself.

Incredibly strong from fighting in many loops, Siffrin traverses the House alone and comes close to defeating the King, only to be slowed down and frozen in time. Overcome by fatigue and self-loathing, he breaks down and is tormented by hallucinations of his party. Eventually, with Loop's help, he is woken up by his actual party, which reflects one of the King's spells back at him, freezing the King in time just as he finally remembers his country.

The members of the party help Siffrin recover, but inadvertently raise the prospect of splitting up, causing him to have a meltdown. The power of Wish Craft enlarges him to a gigantic size, and he laments that he does not want his family to leave. Working together to calm him down, they realize that Siffrin's own Wish Craft was trapping him in the loops: he wished to stay with his party after defeating the King, but could not admit it. The others confess that they also felt the same, and the time loop finally stops. The game ends with Siffrin apologizing for his previous insults and coming to terms with each of his party members, as they end their journey and begin their next one.

If the player takes certain actions, Siffrin can confront Loop again at the end. They admit to being an alternate version of Siffrin who wished to escape from the loop, and was sent to help the current Siffrin. Envious that Siffrin has managed to escape the loop while they are unrecognised by their former party, Loop tries to kill Siffrin and take his place. Regardless of the outcome, Siffrin assures them that he could not have escaped if not for their help. Moved by Siffrin's compassion, Loop disappears, assuring Siffrin that they will meet again.

== Development ==
Adrienne Bazir developed In Stars and Time mostly as a solo creator. The game originated in 2017 as a set of webcomics featuring the then-unnamed protagonist, Siffrin. Bazir found the concept of prophecy and repetition to have potential for a role-playing game, and developed a short prototype: Start Again: A Prologue in 2020. Bazir used RPG Maker MV to develop the game. She (Note: Bazir uses both she/her and they/them pronouns. For consistency, this article will use she/her pronouns.) initially intended both Start Again and the final game to remain relatively small in scope, but both projects grew as development progressed. The black-and white graphical style was chosen for simplicity.

Key inspirations included RPGs such as Undertale and Tales of Symphonia. Bazir was inspired by the latter when writing, wanting to avoid undue focus on Siffrin by making each member of his party distinct and ensuring that they had a "very interesting and rich inner life". From her perspective, Siffrin would not even be the central character in the events that occurred before the start of the game, with another member explicitly being named as the "chosen one" in-game. The Stanley Parable was also cited by Bazir as a "conscious inspiration" for the game in its approach to creating a "conversation with the player" and instilling a sense of "unease".

The looping narrative was influenced by the repetitive and solitary nature of lockdown during the COVID-19 pandemic, with the writing mirroring Bazir's connections with her friends during that time. Additionally, she wanted to expand on the video game concept of replaying sections after dying by having the main character remember previous iterations. Parts of the game were intentionally made repetitive to emphasise the situation Siffrin is in and convey those feelings to the player, with Bazir aiming to create a player experience that was "authentic" to Siffrin's story. The player's annoyance as dialogue is repeated was designed to mirror what Siffrin would also be thinking, with Bazir stating that "art should make you feel bad emotions sometimes". However, she was also inspired by The Stanley Parable to add moments where the repetition is broken and the player is "completely caught off guard".

The game was announced by Bazir and Armor Games Studios in March 2022, and it was showcased in IGN's Summer of Gaming event in June 2023. It was released on November 20, 2023 for Nintendo Switch, PlayStation 4, PlayStation 5, and Windows.

In 2024, following the game's release, Bazir and Studio Thumpy Puppy collaborated with Yetee Records to create a physical vinyl copy of the full OST. Along with a limited edition physical copy of the game, Bazir celebrated the one year anniversary of the games' release with an artbook featuring concept art and art from the games' development.

== Reception ==
Reception

Aggregate scores
| Aggregator | Score |
|---|---|
| Metacritic | 85/100 |
| OpenCritic | 80% recommend |

Review scores
| Publication | Score |
|---|---|
| Nintendo Life | 8/10 |
| Nintendo World Report | 7/10 |
| RPGFan | 80/100 |
| TechRadar | 4/5 |
| Siliconera | 8/10 |

In Stars and Time received "generally favorable" reviews from critics, according to review aggregator website Metacritic. Fellow review aggregator OpenCritic assessed that the game received strong approval, being recommended by 80% of critics. TechRadar reviewer Catherine Lewis stated it stuck with her "for a very long time after playing" and Izzy Parsons of RPGFan described it as a "a must-play for fans of quirky indie games" but "repetitive more often than I would like".

The narrative was praised by reviewers. Parsons described the narrative as the "true heart of the game" and "wonderfully heartfelt and thematic", and Sam Wachter of RPGamer lauded its "powerful twist". The writing was described by Lewis as being "delivered flawlessly" and having characters portrayed "in ways that brilliantly convey their differing personalities". Nintendo Life writer Em Stonham praised the worldbuilding, recommending the game to fans of Undertale and EarthBound.

Reactions to the looping mechanics were mixed. Jenni Lada of Siliconera praised the option to skip forward during repeated dialogue, calling the game "considerate of your time". Lewis stated that the loops were not overly repetitive, but found some of the required backtracking tedious. Conversely, Parsons criticised the game for causing "a feeling of being stuck" but noted that it fit the story: "as Siffrin is getting frustrated with the loops, so too is the player". Nintendo World Report's Jordan Rudek stated that the repetition was "fairly tedious" and difficult to keep track of, but somewhat alleviated by changes in dialogue, while Katharine Castle of Rock, Paper, Shotgun called it "unsatisfying filler". Wachter said the repetitive nature of looping could be "exhausting" and a "punishment" but conceded that it made progressing "incredibly rewarding".

The combat also received a positive response; Stonham said that it was entertaining and could become surprisingly challenging, and Lewis described the jackpot system as "incredibly satisfying". Parsons and Castle also praised the game's battles, but criticised them for remaining the same throughout different loops, claiming that they eventually encouraged the player to skip them or use the escape button.

The game's art direction was largely praised; Parsons described the illustrations as "beautifully drawn", and Wachter said that the enemies were "distinctive and full of personality" and the monochromatic palette was "a bold and interesting choice" that thematically cohered with the narrative. Lada described the colour scheme and user interface design as effective.

IGN's Rebekah Valentine described the game as one of their favourite RPGs of 2023, and Izzy Parsons, of the gaming news site RPGFan, included it as one of their favourite games of the year. It was an Honorable Mention for both the Nuovo Award and the Seumas McNally Grand Prize at the 2024 Independent Games Festival Awards, and it was also nominated for "Emotional Impact" at the Indie Game Awards.
