= Fast Fusion =

2025 video game

- Developer: Shin'en Multimedia
- Publisher: Shin'en Multimedia
- Designer: Manfred Linzner
- Programmer: Manfred Linzner
- Artist: Martin Sauter
- Composers: Bjulin; Francisco Cerda
- Series: Fast
- Engine: SHIN'ENGINE
- Platform: Nintendo Switch 2
- Release: WW: 5 June 2025
- Genre: Racing
- Modes: Single-player, multiplayer

Fast Fusion (stylized as FAST FUSION) is a 2025 racing video game developed and published by Shin'en Multimedia for the Nintendo Switch 2. It is the fourth installment in the Fast series, following Fast RMX. The game was released on 5 June 2025 on the Nintendo eShop as a launch title for the console.

== Gameplay ==
Like most racing video games, players must reach the end of a track as soon as possible. Unique to the Fast series is the polarity mechanic, where players collect boost energy by switching between two colors. Each color has respective boosts and jump pads, which can only be used if a player is currently its respective color. Upon completing a race, players are rewarded a number of points, depending on which place of 8 they finished in. At the end of a cup, players receive an in-game currency called coins which they can use to purchase new cups and vehicles or fuse two vehicles into one.

The game features a single-player campaign with 10 cups of 3 courses to unlock, with only 3 cups to choose from at the beginning of the game, along with 15 unlockable vehicles. These vehicles can be fused together for a total of 210 combinations. From the beginning, players have access to 3 vehicles.

The game also contains multiplayer components, featuring split-screen multiplayer mode for up to 4 players, as well as local communication. Another extra mode called Super Hero Mode is available, using the same tracks as the campaign with higher difficulty and with the boost meter doubling as a health bar, similarly to games in the F-Zero franchise.

== Development ==
Fast Fusion was announced during a Nintendo Direct to be released on 5 June 2025 as a launch title for the Nintendo Switch 2. It runs at up to 4K resolution at 60 frames per second (FPS) and supports HDR, a first for the series. The game uses DLSS for upscaling. It also supports motion control and HD Rumble and includes a four-player split screen mode. Furthermore, the game supports both GameShare and GameChat for two players locally and online, though there is no dedicated online multiplayer mode. Jack Merluzzi, known for voicing the announcer in Fast Racing Neo and F-Zero GX, is among the voice cast for the game.

When asked in an interview about the lack of a 120 FPS mode, Shin'en Multimedia's CEO Manfred Linzner answered: "Of course 120FPS would be nice to have, so we will look if this will be possible for a later patch."

At the time of its release, Fast Fusion featured four performance modes: "Performance", "Balanced", "Quality", and "Ultra Quality", with each using a corresponding quality preset of DLSS and the "Ultra Quality" mode enabling additional graphical details. A "Pure" mode was later added via an update that displays the game without image scaling. Said update, released on June 26, 2025, also added three new tracks and new jukebox entries.

== Reception ==
Reception

Aggregate score
Aggregator	Score
OpenCritic	90% recommend

Fast Fusion was well received by critics.

Nintendo Life praised Fast Fusion for its gameplay, soundtrack, graphics, and performance, giving it a 9/10. GamesRadar+ called Fast Fusion "a superb example of what Switch 2 can deliver", praising the game's 4K resolution at up to 60fps, its price, and the new Super Hero mode which it described as "mega compelling and totally hardcore". Eurogamer praised the game's fluid gameplay, options for graphics modes, vehicle fusion feature, and price, while criticizing its small number of tracks, which they said will be increased with later updates. IGN gave the game 7 out of 10 points, calling it "a well-made sequel" to Fast RMX. The British magazine T3 compared Fast Fusion's price favorably to that of Mario Kart World, stating "Fast Fusion comes in at just £13.49 in the UK and $14.99 in the US, which is drastically less than the surprisingly and disappointingly expensive £66.99 or $79.99 that you need to fork out for a digital copy of Mario Kart World." Bruno Yonezawa from Screen Rant called Fast Fusion "[T]he alternative to Mario Kart World", saying that "[its] multiplayer experience can rival that of Mario Kart World, even if it is significantly different" while also praising the game's lower price.
