= Iridion II =

2003 video game

- Developer: Shin'en Multimedia
- Publishers: Majesco; Vivendi Universal Games (PAL)
- Composer: Manfred Linzner
- Platform: Game Boy Advance
- Release: Game Boy Advance: NA: May 12, 2003; PAL: June 20, 2003; Windows; April 8, 2020
- Genre: Scrolling shooter
- Mode: Single-player

Iridion II is a scrolling shooter video game developed by Shin'en Multimedia and published by Majesco and Vivendi Universal Games in North America and PAL regions respectively for the Game Boy Advance handheld video game console. It is the sequel to Iridion 3D although it is played from a different perspective.

Iridion was re-released on Steam on April 8, 2020, alongside Iridion 3D

== Story ==
After the events in Iridion 3D, the forces of the Iridion disappeared completely which prompted mankind to travel into space and colonize the planets of the Iridion home galaxy. However, after hundreds of peaceful years, the Iridion Empire returned and attacked the human colonists with the intent of retaking their planets. The player assumes control over the SHN-27 en route to save mankind from the Iridion once more.

== Gameplay ==
The player pilots the SHN-27 through three different modes of play, although Story Mode has to be cleared in order to unlock the other modes in the game such as Arcade and Challenge.

In Story mode, the player follows a plot involving the defense fleet chasing the Iridion forces through five different solar systems in three areas each, although each area is symbolized as a planet (including asteroid belts and space travel zones). There is a total of fifteen levels, each ending in a boss battle. The other modes include Arcade and Challenge mode, the latter being a boss-attack mode.

The player has to select from one of six weapons at the beginning of each stage, but the player can also select and change weapons during game play once a green power-up was collected. The player can also use the Power-ups to empower firing strength or replenish the ship's armor. The green power-ups also increases the shot count by adding two Satellites (or Options) that saddled alongside the ship. The player could change the position of the Satellites depending on the ship's movement, but only while the ship was not firing. The player can also collect Bomb pick-ups and could stock up a total of three. The player's ship was also equipped with a charge shot that, once fully charged, would unleash a very powerful plasma blast. The ship has an armor gauge that once depleted would destroy the ship completely and the player would have to start from a checkpoint.

A unique feature to the game included a brief music mode in the game's main menu where players could change the Lead, Chords, Bass and Drums to the title theme through four different songs.

== Reception ==
Reception

Aggregate score
Aggregator	Score
Metacritic	78/100

Review scores
Publication	Score
Game Informer	8/10
GamePro	3.5/5
GameSpot	8.2/10
GameSpy	3/5
GameZone	8.5/10
IGN	8/10
Joypad	7/10
Nintendo Power	3.5/5

The game received "generally favorable reviews", a lot more positive than the original Iridion 3D, according to the review aggregation website Metacritic.
