= The Tartarus Key =

- Developer: Vertical Reach
- Publisher: Armor Games Studios
- Designer: Leonor Parra
- Programmer: Kevin Colegate
- Artist: Leonor Parra
- Composer: Josie Brechner
- Platforms: Nintendo Switch; PlayStation 4; Windows; Xbox One; Xbox Series X/S
- Release: WW: May 31, 2023
- Genre: Adventure
- Mode: Single-player

The Tartarus Key is an adventure video game developed by Vertical Reach and published by Armor Games Studios in 2023. It features escape the room gameplay.

== Gameplay ==
Protagonist Alex Young wakes in a strange mansion. She must solve puzzles in each room before she can exit. Some of these puzzles involve other prisoners, and the ending that players receive depends on how many people they save. It is played from a first-person perspective and uses PlayStation 1-era graphics. The puzzles are not timed.

== Development ==
Armor Games Studios released The Tartarus Key for Windows, PlayStation 4, Nintendo Switch, Xbox One, and Xbox Series X/S on May 31, 2023.

== Reception ==
The Tartarus Key received mixed reviews on Metacritic. Describing it as "a must play for puzzle fans", Rock Paper Shotgun said the attention to detail necessary to solve the puzzles makes it "almost an immersive sim" and that some of them "feel revelatory to solve". Although they said puzzle game fans might enjoy it, Eurogamer felt that the game's meta aspects prevented it from becoming scary, making it more like a real-life escape room parlor game; Rock Paper Shotgun instead praised these meta elements. Though acknowledging that The Tartarus Key is not scary, Rock Paper Shotgun felt it effectively evokes nostalgia for a range of horror franchises. Slant Magazine, who did not like the narrative elements, said The Tartarus Key "squeaks by on the strength of its puzzles alone". Push Square praised the retro graphics, writing, and puzzles, though they said some puzzles feel "too obtuse".
