= Shin'en Multimedia =

German video game developer

- Type: GmbH
- Industry: Video games
- Founded: April 1, 1999; 27 years ago
- Headquarters: Munich, Germany
- Products: Fast
- Website: www.shinen.com

Shin'en Multimedia is a German independent video game developer. Based in Munich, the company was founded in 1999 by former members of the demoscene group Abyss. They develop games primarily for the Nintendo Switch 2 and Nintendo Switch, some non-Nintendo platforms such as the PlayStation 4 and the PlayStation 5, and previously for the Wii U, Wii, Nintendo 3DS, Nintendo DS, Game Boy Advance and Game Boy Color. Their most notable games include the Fast series, which beginning with Fast RMX have been released as launch titles for Nintendo consoles.

In addition to developing games, Shin'en created the soundtracks for around 200 video games by other developers, and built the GHX, GAX, DSX, and NAX (which is based on the GAX) handheld audio middleware.

Their name is derived from the Japanese word 深淵 (shin'en, "abyss"), as a nod towards their original name.

== Games ==
Year	Title	Platform(s)	Publisher
2001	Käpt'n Blaubärs verrückte Schatzsuche	Game Boy Color	Ravensburger Interactive Media
2001	Iridion 3D	Game Boy Advance	Majesco
2002	Maya the Bee: The Great Adventure	Game Boy Advance	Acclaim Entertainment
2003	Iridion II	Game Boy Advance	Majesco
2005	Maya the Bee: Sweet Gold	Game Boy Advance	Midway Games
2005	Nanostray	Nintendo DS	Majesco (NA), THQ (EU), Taito (JP)
2006	Miss Spider's Sunny Patch Friends: Harvest Time Hop and Fly	Nintendo DS	The Game Factory
2007	Garfield's Nightmare	Nintendo DS	The Game Factory
2007	Pet Alien: An Intergalactic Puzzlepalooza	Nintendo DS	The Game Factory
2007	Strawberry Shortcake: The Four Seasons Cake	Nintendo DS	The Game Factory
2008	Nanostray 2	Nintendo DS	Majesco
2008	Zenses Rainforest Edition	Nintendo DS	The Game Factory
2008	Zenses Ocean Edition	Nintendo DS	The Game Factory
2008	Fun! Fun! Minigolf	Wii	Self-published
2010	Jett Rocket	Wii	Self-published
2010	Art of Balance	Wii, Nintendo 3DS, Wii U, PlayStation 4, Nintendo Switch	Self-published
2011	Fast Racing League	Wii	Self-published
2011	Nano Assault	Nintendo 3DS	Majesco
2012	Fun! Fun! Minigolf Touch!	Nintendo 3DS	Self-published
2012	Nano Assault Neo	Wii U, PlayStation 4	Self-published
2013	Nano Assault EX	Nintendo 3DS	Self-published
2013	Jett Rocket II: The Wrath of Taikai	Nintendo 3DS	Self-published
2015	Family Tennis SP (Note: This game was published, but not developed by Shin'en Multimedia.)	Wii U	Self-published
2015	Fast Racing Neo (Note: A physical retail version of Fast Racing Neo was published by Nintendo in 2016 for the PAL region.)	Wii U	Self-published
2017	Fast RMX	Nintendo Switch	Self-published
2019	The Touryst	Nintendo Switch, Windows, Xbox One, Xbox Series X/S, PlayStation 4, PlayStation 5	Self-published
2022	The Punchuin	Nintendo Switch, PlayStation 4, PlayStation 5	Self-published
2025	Fast Fusion	Nintendo Switch 2	Self-published

In addition, Shin'en has developed the audio of hundreds of games on Game Boy Color, Game Boy Advance, Nintendo DS, WiiWare and Nokia N-Gage as an outsourced audio developer, using their proprietary audio engines.

== Technology ==
=== SHIN'ENGINE ===
SHIN'ENGINE, formally named C-Engine, is a proprietary Game engine developed by Shin'en and has been used in all of their games since Nanostray 2. Development began in 2006 and has since received revisions for newer console generations. SHIN'ENGINE is designed for targeting 60 Frames per second across hardware constrained platforms such as the Nintendo DS, Nintendo Wii, and Nintendo Switch.
