= Zombotron =

Video game shooter series

- Genres: Side-scroller, third-person shooter, action, platformer
- Developer: Anton Karlov
- Publisher: Armor Games Studios
- Platforms: Flash, Windows, Mac, iOS, Android
- First release: July 2011
- Latest release: November 21, 2023

Zombotron is a series of action-platformer video games developed by Anton Karlov and published by Armor Games. The games were initially created in Adobe Flash before transitioning to Unity. The series is set in post-apocalyptic worlds and focuses on the player's survival on an alien planet. As of 2026, the series consists of five games.

== History ==
Release timeline
2011	Zombotron 1
2012	Zombotron 2
2013	Zombotron 2: Time Machine
2014
2015
2016
2017
2018
2019	Zombotron 2019
2020
2021
2022
2023	Zombotron Re-Boot

Developer Anton Karlov lives in Russia. The first three games in the series were developed using Adobe Flash. The games follow a storyline where the player crash-lands, and must find a way to survive or escape. The initial installment, Zombotron 1, was released in July 2011 as an Adobe Flash game. Its sequel, Zombotron 2, followed in June 2012. The third game, Zombotron 2: Time Machine, was released in September 2013.

On April 22, 2019, the fourth game in the series, titularly titled Zombotron, was released on Steam after being greenlit. This installment diverged from its predecessors as it was developed using Unity and made available on the Steam platform. It introduced a new weapons system, soundtrack, graphics, and level designs. In it, the player controls Blaze Rush, a space mercenary who has followed a distress beacon to an alien planet.

A reboot of the series, Zombotron Re-Boot, was first released to iOS, Android, and PC (via itch.io) on November 21, 2023.

== Reception ==
The first three games received little critical attention. Zombotron, the fourth installment, received mixed reviews from critics. The game's graphics and controls were praised by some reviewers, while others criticized aspects such as the gameplay and loot system. Rogan Chahine from Indie Game Website noted that "Zombotron occasionally feels like just another 2D platformer, but if that's the kind of game you're looking for, then it checks all the boxes." John Hanson from Culture of Gaming criticized the loot system and described the gameplay as "too repetitive." As of 2025, The game Zombotron Re-Boot has reached over 5 million downloads on Google Play.
