= Shadow person =

Perception of a patch of shadow as a living, humanoid figure

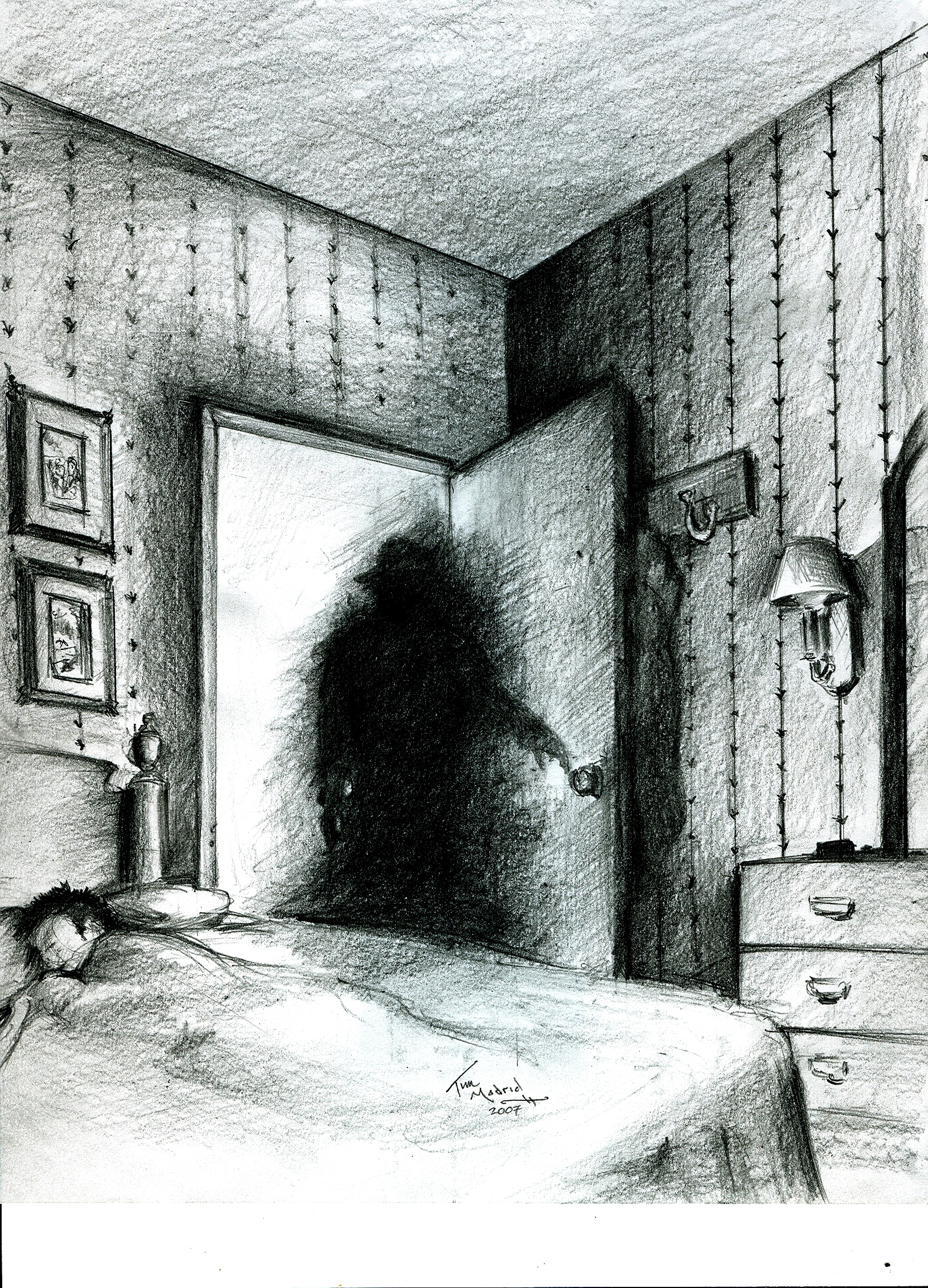
Illustration of a shadow person.

A shadow person (also known as a shadow figure or black mass) is a popular subject in circles of the paranormal and the supernatural, detailing beings resembling animate human shadows, sometimes interpreted as the presence of a spirit.

== History and folklore ==
A number of religions, legends, and belief systems describe supernatural entities such as shades of the underworld, and various shadowy humanoids have long been a staple of folklore and ghost stories, such as the Islamic Jinn and the Choctaw Nalusa Falaya.

The Coast to Coast AM late-night radio talk show helped popularize modern beliefs in shadow people. The first time the topic of shadow people was discussed at length on the program was April 12, 2001, when host Art Bell interviewed a man pretending to be a Native American elder, Thunder Strikes, who is also known as Harley "SwiftDeer" Reagan. During the show, listeners were encouraged to submit drawings of shadow people that they had seen and a large number of these drawings were immediately shared publicly on the show's website.

In October that year, Heidi Hollis published her first book on the topic of shadow people, and later became a regular guest on Coast to Coast. Hollis describes shadow people as dark silhouettes with human shapes and profiles that flicker in and out of peripheral vision, and claims that people have reported the figures attempting to "jump on their chest and choke them". She believes the figures to be negative aliens that can be repelled by various means, including invoking "the Name of Jesus".

Although participants in online discussion forums devoted to paranormal and supernatural topics describe them as menacing, other believers and paranormal authors do not agree whether shadow people are either evil, helpful, or neutral, and some even speculate that shadow people may be the extra-dimensional inhabitants of another universe. Some paranormal investigators and authors such as Chad Stambaugh claim to have recorded images of shadow people on video.

Shadow people feature in two episodes of ITV paranormal documentary series Extreme Ghost Stories, where the phenomenon is described as a "black mass".

=== The "Hat Man" ===
One example of a particular shadow person is the "Hat Man", who shares the characteristics of general shadow people but is named for a fedora or other brimmed hat on his head. Descriptions of the Hat Man date back to as early as the late 2000s. The Hat Man is commonly associated with sleep paralysis and the abuse of the antihistamine medicine diphenhydramine, commonly sold under the brand name Benadryl. He is typically described as having very few or no discernible features, although some witnesses have claimed they can "feel him staring" at them.

== Scientific explanations ==
Several physiological and psychological conditions have been used to account for reported experiences of shadowy shapes seeming alive. A sleep paralysis sufferer may perceive a "shadowy or indistinct shape" approaching them when they lie awake paralyzed and become increasingly alarmed.

A person experiencing heightened emotion, such as while walking alone on a dark night, may incorrectly perceive a patch of shadow as an attacker.

Many methamphetamine addicts report the appearance of "shadow people" after prolonged periods of sleep deprivation. Psychiatrist Jack Potts suggests that methamphetamine usage adds a "conspiratorial component" to the sleep deprivation hallucinations. One interviewed subject said that "You don't see shadow dogs or shadow birds or shadow cars. You see shadow people. Standing in doorways, walking behind you, coming at you on the sidewalk." These hallucinations have been directly compared to the paranormal entities described in folklore.

Shadow people are commonly reported by people under the effects of deliriant substances such as datura, diphenhydramine, and benzydamine.

Finally, visual hallucinations, such as those caused by schizophrenia and bipolar disorder, may appear to be shadowy figures at the edge of peripheral vision.

== In popular culture ==
- An episode of the 1985 Twilight Zone series titled "The Shadow Man" dealt with a teenage boy who had a shadow person living under his bed. The episode portrayed the shadow man as fitting the "hat man" appearance commonly ascribed to shadow people and added to the mythology that shadow people can kill humans but will not harm those under whose beds they live.
- Terry Goodkind includes "shadow people" in his fantasy novel series The Sword of Truth, starting with the book Wizard's First Rule. In that fantasy world, shadow people are essentially evil spirits who lure people to their deaths, such as by impersonating the voices and likenesses of their deceased loved ones and beckoning that their victims come closer towards danger:

Richard frowned. "Shadow people? What were they?" "Shadows in the air. Shadow people had no solid form, no precise shape, they were not even alive as we know it, but beings created out of magic." [...] "They would come floating across a field or through a wood. Weapons had no effect on them. Swords and arrows went through them as if they were nothing more than smoke. You couldn't hide; shadow people could see you anywhere. One would drift right up to a person and touch him. The touch caused the person's whole body to blister and swell and finally split open. No one touched by a shadow person ever survived. Whole battalions were found killed to a man." [...] "When Panis Rahl started using magic in that way, a great and honorable wizard joined the side of the Midlands cause." [...] "He conjured up battle horns for the armies. When the shadow people came, our men blew the horns and magic swept the shadow people away like smoke in the wind. It turned the course of battle to our side." (etc.)

- In the 1998 video game LSD: Dream Emulator, a humanoid figure commonly known as the Gray Man may appear in some dreams, who, if touched, undoes all dream progress and erases saved flashback data. The figure, in both appearance and roles in dreams, is similar to that of the "Hat Man" phenomenon.
- Shadow people, described as "Shadow Men", feature prominently in the 2007 novel John Dies at the End. When they kill a person, that person is retroactively erased from existence, and history is rewritten as though they were never born.
- In a 2012 episode of A&E's Intervention series, the subject Skyler is plagued by "shadow people", sometimes called "phase people", and sprays a mist to unveil them in the refractions. He also builds weapons to fight them and alleges that they are using stolen technology to telepathically communicate with certain individuals.
- In the online game Deep Sleep and its sequels, shadow people have existed since the dawn of the human race and lurk in lucid dreams. Players who realize that they are asleep can be paralyzed and possessed, and the character's dream self will be turned into a shadow person.
- The 2013 horror film Shadow People depicts a fictional sleep study conducted during the 1970s in which patients report seeing shadowy intruders before dying in their sleep. The film follows a radio host and CDC investigator who research the story, and the story is claimed to be based on true events.
- The Nightmare is a 2015 documentary that discusses the causes of sleep paralysis as seen through extensive interviews with participants, and the experiences are re-enacted by professional actors. It proposes that such cultural phenomena as alien abduction, the near death experience and shadow people can, in many cases, be attributed to sleep paralysis. The "real-life" horror film debuted at the Sundance Film Festival on January 26 and premiered in theatres on June 5.
- The song "The Shadow Man Incident" by the band Dream Theater, from their 2025 album Parasomnia, deals with shadow people.

== See also ==
- Antimuscarinic drug
- Apparitional experience – an anomalous experience in parapsychology
- Brocken spectre – an atmospheric optical phenomenon
- Demons - Certain religions regard these entities as The Devil, devils, demons.
- Domovoy – household spirits in Slavic religious tradition
- Jinn – supernatural beings in Arabic culture
- Extracampine hallucination – beyond the field of vision
- Men in black – supposed government agents associated with UFO conspiracy theories
- Pareidolia – the perception of meaningfulness in random or vague stimuli
- Shade (mythology)
- Shadow (psychology)
- Sleep paralysis
