= Achievement hunting =

Video game hobby

An example of a notification that a player might receive for completing an achievement

Achievement hunting is a video game hobby. It is the focus of acquiring in-game awards, called achievements. Those who do this are called achievement hunters. They typically treat unlocking achievements as a meta-goal, often choosing games for their challenge, completion speed, or to showcase the amount of achievements earned on their profile. While the term is primarily associated with Xbox and Steam, it is similar to trophy hunting on PlayStation platforms.

== Achievements ==
Achievements are awarded to gamers that achieve certain tasks within video games. They are in-game awards presented to gamers for hitting specific targets or reaching certain milestones, such as completing a difficult level or defeating a certain number of enemies. Typically, each achievement is graded by rarity, based on the percentage of people who have unlocked it. Developers can choose to make various achievements hidden so that their value and description are not revealed until after the user has obtained them.

== Motivation and appeal ==
Some opt to chase achievements because they serve as digital proof of their in-game accomplishments. The motivation for players to earn achievements may also lie in maximizing their own general cross-title score and obtaining recognition for their performance due to the publication of their achievement/trophy profiles. Some players pursue the unlocking of achievements as a goal in itself, without especially seeking to enjoy the game that awards them. Some may choose to do it for the feeling of completion it provides; in an article published by Wired, PlayStation trophy hunter Roughdawg4 said, "I've always been a completionist gamer so earning trophies and doing all you can in a game just came naturally for me".

== Community ==
Achievement hunting has created a dedicated gaming subculture. Websites created exclusively for achievement and trophy hunters have arose over the years, such as Exophase, PSNProfiles and TrueAchievements. These websites have become a database of user-created forums, guides and leaderboards.

== Impact ==
Achievement hunting has impacted video gaming in a generally positive way, through the boosting of sales of video games that some video gamers may have not otherwise played if they lacked an achievement list. However, it has also received some criticism for its promotion of shovelware video games on digital console storefronts: low-quality, cheap video games that are designed exclusively for quick achievements. Some have expressed concern that these spam games have caused a negative impact on both players and developers by detracting from the user experience, and preventing other games from gaining recognition. In recent years, PlayStation in particular has responded by delisting games from their store and closing developer accounts.
