= Art of Balance =

2010 video game

- Developer: Shin'en Multimedia
- Publisher: Shin'en Multimedia
- Platforms: Wii, Nintendo 3DS, Wii U, PlayStation 4, Nintendo Switch
- Release: Wii; 26 March 2010; Nintendo 3DS; 25 September 2012; Wii U 25 September 2013; PS4; 3 June 2016; Nintendo Switch; 4 October 2018
- Genre: Puzzle
- Modes: Single-player, multiplayer

Art of Balance (stylized in lowercase in its logo) is a 2010 puzzle video game developed and published by Shin'en Multimedia for the Wii. Originally released as a WiiWare title in 2010, it was enhanced in high definition and ported to the Wii U's and Nintendo Switch's eShop in 2013 and 2018, respectively, and PlayStation 4's PlayStation Store in 2016. A version with touch controls was also ported to the Nintendo 3DS's eShop in 2012, titled Art of Balance TOUCH!

== Gameplay ==
Art of Balance is a puzzle game in which the player has to stack several blocks on top of one another on a platform floating in water without the blocks falling into the water. The blocks can be rotated at 45° angles and can take on various shapes. Some blocks will break if too many blocks are placed on it. Once all blocks have been used, a countdown starts playing that is required to reach zero in order to pass a level; this countdown was shortened in versions following the original Wii release. The game features several game modes.

In arcade mode, the player has a supply of blocks. The point is to stack the blocks on top of each other until there are none left. Then the tower must stand still for three more seconds without falling over. In this game mode there are eight worlds with a total of 200 puzzles. There are also super puzzles in which the player has a time limit or the platform sways on the water. The puzzles can also be played cooperatively with a second player.

== Reception ==
Reception

Aggregate score
Aggregator	Score
Metacritic	Wii: 88/100; Wii U, 3DS: 82/100

Art of Balance has been praised for its "simple yet clever mechanics" and "serene soundtrack". It received generally favorable reviews, with Eurogamer's Kristan Reed calling it a "nothing short of essential" game. IGN praised the simplistic and addicting gameplay, accurate controls, visual presentation, and well-made difficulty progression. Nintendo Life similarly found the gameplay addictive and praised the game's simplicity and intuitive controls, while also enjoying its physics and "smooth and gradual increase in difficulty". In its test of the 3DS version, Der Spiegel called it "one of the best cheap games for [the] Nintendo 3DS".
