= Waterworks! =

2020 video game

- Developer: Mateusz Sokalszczuk
- Publisher: Armor Games
- Platforms: Windows, macOS
- Genre: CMS
- Mode: Single-player

Waterworks! is a card-based strategy video game developed by Mateusz Sokalszczuk (also known by his online name scriptwelder) in co-operation with the University of Gdańsk and funded by the Polish Ministry of Science and Higher Education. The game focuses on managing the water systems of the Polish city of Grudziądz during the Middle Ages.

== Gameplay ==
Waterworks! is card-based, with the player using a series of cards in order to grow Grudziądz's water management system. As the game progresses, the water systems built become more complicated. The growing complexity of water systems the player must build correspond to those of the actual city of Grudziądz, which had to improve its waterworks as its population grew.

== Development ==
Waterworks! was initially conceived by Waclaw Kulczykowski of the University of Gdańsk, who was developing a thesis on the water systems of Grudziadz. The game took about a year to develop. After release, a patch was released that fixed numerous bugs relating to the storage of resources.

== Reception ==
Waterworks! was positively received by critics. PC Gamer, in their review of the game, described it as "a superbly designed resource-management strategy game", and praised its card mechanics.
