= Fast (video game series) =

Racing game series

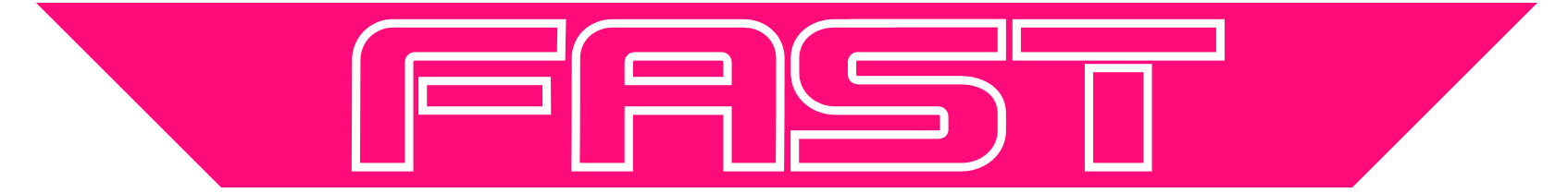
- Font used for Fast RMX (2017)
- Genre: Racing
- Developer: Shin'en Multimedia
- Publisher: Shin'en Multimedia
- Platforms: Wii, Wii U, Nintendo Switch, Nintendo Switch 2
- First release: Fast Racing League; May 27, 2011
- Latest release: Fast Fusion; June 5, 2025

Fast (often stylized in uppercase) is a series of racing video games developed and published by German game developer Shin'en Multimedia. Released exclusively for Nintendo platforms, the series consists of four games, all following the same racing and phase-shifting formula: Fast Racing League, Fast Racing Neo, Fast RMX, and Fast Fusion.

The series has been compared to F-Zero and Wipeout.

== Gameplay ==
Each of the four Fast games follows the same basic formula. All four have the same phase-shifting mechanic, where players switch between two different phases, represented by two different colors. Each phase has its own respective boosts and jump pads, which can only be used if the player has shifted to its corresponding phase. Each Fast game has the player trying to get to the end of a course as quick as possible, like typical racing games, while using the phase-shift mechanic. Boosts can also be performed by using energy, which is collected throughout the race.

== Games ==
=== Fast Racing League ===
Released exclusively on the now defunct Wii Shop Channel in 2011, Fast Racing League is the first game in the series. There are 3 leagues for the player to play through (called Shima, Siberia, and Sunahara), though each must be played 3 times, each on a different difficulty level (called Neutron, Proton and Ion). Different vehicles are also unlockable, each with different stats. Unlike the next two Fast games, players must collect and use energy to shift between phases. Fast Racing League received generally positive reviews, with Nintendo Life's Marcel van Duyn calling the game's difficulty "brutal", and praising the game as "another amazing accomplishment for WiiWare."

=== Fast Racing Neo ===
Released on the Wii U in 2015, Neo expands on the Wii version, with additions such as HD graphics and more tracks. Unlike the previous entry, energy is no longer required to shift phases, but is still needed to perform a boost. New to the series was online multiplayer, which can be played with Wii U friends, as well as random online players. Neo received generally favorable reviews, with IGN's Cassidee Moser calling the game an "impressive production" and "visually interesting". The game received DLC in the form of extra tracks in the Neo Future Track, which featured 8 new tracks and 10 vehicles profiles. Because of the game's success, a physical version was released in 2016, exclusive to Europe and Australia, under Nintendo's eShop Selects brand, which included the DLC.

=== Fast RMX ===
Fast RMX is a remixed and enhanced version of Fast Racing Neo. RMX was a launch title for the Nintendo Switch, and featured a total of 36 tracks, as well as 15 different vehicles. RMX features the return of every track from Neo, including its DLC, plus an additional 6 tracks. A free update was released on 13 September 2017, which added 6 more tracks. Like its predecessor, Fast RMX received generally favorable reviews, with Nintendo Life's Alex Olney calling it better than Neo "and then some". RMX makes use of features exclusive to the Nintendo Switch, such as HD rumble and single Joy-Con support.

=== Fast Fusion ===
Fast Fusion, the newest entry in the series, was announced during a Nintendo Direct to be released on 5 June 2025 as a launch title for the Nintendo Switch 2. It runs at up to 4K resolution at 60 frames per second and supports HDR, a first for the series. It also supports motion control and HD Rumble and includes a four-player split screen mode. Furthermore, the game supports both GameShare and GameChat for two players locally and online. The game allows players to "create hundreds of new Racing machines by fusing your favourite vehicles." Jack Merluzzi, known for voicing the announcer in Fast Racing Neo and F-Zero GX, is among the voice cast for the game.
