= Crush the Castle =

2009 video game

- Developers: Joey Betz and Chris "ConArtist" Condon
- Publisher: Armor Games
- Programmer: Joey Betz
- Engine: Adobe Flash (Browser)
- Platforms: Browser, iOS, Android
- Release: Browser; April 28, 2009 iOS; January 19, 2010
- Genre: Action
- Mode: Single-player

Crush the Castle is a physics game developed by Armor Games. The Flash version was released on April 28, 2009, and versions for the iPhone and iPod Touch were released on January 19, 2010. Notable for its "flinging" game mechanic, which influenced the popular mobile game Angry Birds, the goal of Crush the Castle is to kill all inhabitants of various castles by using a trebuchet to fling large rocks or bombs. A sequel, Crush the Castle 2, has similar gameplay, but features new maps and power-ups.

== Gameplay ==
The goal of the game is to kill all inhabitants of various castles by using a trebuchet to fling large rocks or bombs. Players are able to create and destroy their own designs of castles as well.

=== Crush the Castle 2 ===
Crush the Castle 2 is similar, but features new maps, new power-ups and a revamped level builder. New things to fire from the trebuchet are greek fire, ice grenades, jars full of electric eels, and a mysterious purple flask that creates a small black hole. In addition, structural components can be disintegrated.

== Development and release ==
The developers cite the game Castle Clout, released October 4, 2008 by Liam Bowmers, as their inspiration. Armor Games requested and received permission from Bowmers to use his ideas for the development of Crush the Castle. The game was released on the Armor Games website on April 28, 2009, an iOS version was released on January 19, 2010.

== Reception ==
IGN's Jeffrey Haynes called the game "surprisingly deep and fun for such a simple premise". Joystiq's Justin McElroy stated: "It's a simple mechanic, but it's hard to deny that's it's satisfying." GameZebo's Stephen Greenwell rated it 2/5 stars, stating it is "easy to pick up and play" but has "very repetitive gameplay" and "lackluster visuals and sounds". IGN's Levi Buchanan rated it 7/10, stating "If you like physics-based puzzle games, this really is one of the best." Kotaku's Brian Crecente said, "I've grown quite fond of Crush the Castle." Gamasutra's Christopher Hyde listed Crush the Castle in his list of "The 99 Best Free Games Of 2009".

== See also ==
- Boom Blox
