= Fun! Fun! Minigolf =

2008 video game

- Developer: Shin'en Multimedia
- Publisher: Shin'en Multimedia
- Platform: Wii
- Release: NA: 22 December 2008; PAL: 2 January 2009
- Genre: Sports
- Modes: Single-player, multiplayer

Fun! Fun! Minigolf is a minigolf video game developed and published by Shin'en Multimedia for the Wii. It was first released on the WiiWare service in North America on 22 December 2008, and later in PAL regions on 2 January 2009.

== Reception ==
GameSpot gave Fun! Fun! Minigolf a 7 out of 10, saying "like real minigolf, it is best enjoyed with a group of people who won't take it too seriously". Nintendo Life gave the game 6 out of 10, commenting that "Fun! Fun! Minigolf provides a satisfying first-time play through on the easy difficulty holes, but will frustrate you to no end if you are up to the challenge of figuring out all of the harder 18 holes." IGN gave it 5.8/10, criticizing the short length of the game and fixed gameplay rules that cannot be changed.

== Sequel ==
On 13 December 2011, a sequel to Fun! Fun! Minigolf was revealed by Nintendo for the Nintendo 3DS. It is titled Fun! Fun! Minigolf Touch! and was released on March 8, 2012, in North America and Europe.
