= Crypt Custodian =

2024 video game

- Developer: Kyle Thompson
- Publisher: Top Hat Studios
- Designer: Kyle Thompson
- Programmer: Kyle Thompson
- Artist: Kyle Thompson
- Composer: Eric Thompson
- Platforms: Nintendo Switch; PlayStation 4; PlayStation 5; Xbox One; Xbox Series X/S
- Release: 27 August 2024
- Genre: Metroidvania
- Mode: Single-player

Crypt Custodian is a 2024 Metroidvania video game developed independently by Kyle Thompson and published by Top Hat Studios. A single-player video game played from the top-down perspective, it follows Pluto, a black cat who dies and is tasked with cleaning up the underworld. With his broom, Pluto must sweep up trash and fight enemies, make friends with other creatures, and escape the afterlife. Crypt Custodian features abilities, upgrades, power-ups, and collectible items that the player can purchase with in-game currency or obtain through exploration, defeating enemies, or solving puzzles. The map is separated into themed areas that are gradually unlocked as the story progresses. Crypt Custodian has three main difficulty levels, as well as several additional game modes.

Crypt Custodian is Thompson's third indie game, after Sheepo (2020) and Islets (2022). The game was released on 27 August 2024 for PC (via Steam), Windows, Nintendo Switch, PlayStation 4, PlayStation 5, Xbox One, and Xbox Series X/S. A physical edition for PlayStation 5 and Nintendo Switch was released on 29 August 2025. Crypt Custodian received generally favorable reviews. Reviewers praised the charm, narrative, characters, artwork, music, and worldbuilding, but they criticized the difficulty scaling and repetitive area design. It was described as a good introductory game to the Metroidvania genre.

== Gameplay ==
Crypt Custodian is a single-player video game of the Metroidvania and action-adventure genres. It is played from the top-down perspective. The game follows Pluto, a black house cat who dies and is sent to the afterlife, where he is tasked with cleaning up the underworld by a bullfrog named Kendra. With his broom, Pluto must sweep up trash and fight various enemies and spirits, with the ultimate goal of breaking into Kendra's castle and escaping the underworld. To help in his journey, Pluto must also befriend the creatures he meets along the way, who have roles ranging from passers-by to shopkeepers that can be purchased from. Through interactions and conversations with these other characters, the player is able to learn more about their stories and backgrounds and eventually must recruit them as aid in the quest to storm Kendra's castle.

A player fighting the Stone Golem boss in Crypt Custodian

Crypt Custodian features collectible items, including photographs illustrating character backstories and Jukebox Discs that allow the player to control the in-game music. Charms can show the player previously hidden paths or increase their health or attack speed. The game also has twenty-four passive upgrades the player can unlock (and which require the use of ability upgrade points to equip), as well as special attacks. These items, points, or power-ups can be found hidden throughout the map, obtained by defeating enemies, earned by solving puzzles, unlocked through rescuing cat spirits trapped in vases, or purchased through garbage, the in-game currency. Garbage can also be used to buy hints, including for directions to help with navigating the map.

The map consists of many small islands that make up more than ten themed areas; previously inaccessible portions of the map can be explored as the player unlocks new movement abilities, generally through boss fights. Throughout the map, shrines in the form of wells perform various functions, such as allowing the player to save their progress, restore their health, and teleport. To decrease the difficulty level of the game, the player can choose to increase their total health or disable fall damage. Crypt Custodian has three main difficulty levels, as well as additional game modes including Boss Rush, which allows the player to replay boss fights at varying levels of difficulty; Shuffle Mode, which randomizes collectibles for increased challenge; and a Speedrun mode.

== Development ==
Crypt Custodian was developed by Oregon-based American indie game developer Kyle Thompson and published by Top Hat Studios. Thompson began creating games at age 12, with Game Maker. He created flash games as a teenager, and, around that time, learned of the Metroidvania genre and enjoyed it and its exploratory nature, later citing An Untitled Story (2007) and Knytt Stories (2007) as early favorites and influences. He resumed game development around ten years later, and, formerly a creative freelancer, now makes games full-time.

Crypt Custodian is Thompson's third indie game in four years, after Sheepo (2020) and Islets (2022). Since his previous two games were both side-scrollers, Thompson found it difficult to envision new side-scrolling video game elements and mechanics for another game. As a result, he decided to create Crypt Custodian to be played from the top-down perspective. Initial ideas for the game included a concept similar to pachinko (a Japanese mechanical game combining elements of pinball and slot machines), featuring bullet hell projectiles that the player could pause and interact with. Thompson disliked this idea because he did not feel like it would be fun enough, and thought it relied too much on arbitrary chance. He also considered a concept for a game where players would defeat ghosts by vacuuming them up, which he rejected after a friend pointed out similarities to Luigi's Mansion (2001) and Ghostbusters (1984).

After finishing Islets, Thompson identified "exploration and customization" as specific aspects of his game design that he wanted to focus on improving with Crypt Custodian, which he worked on by creating a more interconnected map and granting the player heightened freedom in exploration, build customization, and general gameplay. In a 2025 interview with Gamepressure, Thompson stated, "One regret in Crypt Custodian is that most of the abilities you gain don't affect the movement apart from very specific areas". In an earlier interview, he also stated that he wanted to make the abilities "more interesting and useful", and to create a "cohesive world that connects logically". He said he would try to remedy these problems in his upcoming game, Well Dweller.

Thompson spent around 40 hours each week developing Crypt Custodian. The game's soundtrack was composed by his brother, Eric Thompson, who as of September 2026 has created the music for all four of his games.

== Release ==
Crypt Custodian's launch was announced by Top Hat Studios at the 2024 Summer Game Fest. It was released on 27 August 2024 for PC (via Steam), Nintendo Switch, PlayStation 4, PlayStation 5, Xbox One, and Xbox Series X/S. It is available on Steam Deck and was added to the Xbox Game Pass in June 2025. An official physical edition for PlayStation 5 and Nintendo Switch was announced on 22 April 2025 and released on 29 August. In the announcement, Top Hat Studios also teased Kyle Thompson's new game—later revealed to be Well Dweller, a "dark fairy tale Metroidvania" scheduled for release in 2026.

== Reception ==
Reception

Aggregate scores
Aggregator	Score
Metacritic	PC: 82/100; NS: 83/100; PS5: 86/100
OpenCritic	89% recommend

Review scores
Publication	Score
Nintendo Life	8/10
PC Gamer (US)	70/100
Push Square	8/10
Dot Esports	8/10
Gamer.nl	85/100

According to review aggregator website Metacritic, Crypt Custodian has received "generally favorable" reviews. Fellow review aggregator OpenCritic assessed that the game received strong approval, being recommended by 89% of critics. Heather Wald of GamesRadar+ said, "above all, it's just downright charming", a sentiment echoed by many other reviewers.

Crypt Custodian was praised for its "cutesy" and "lovable" characters and their various backstories, which critics found humorous yet moving. The dialogue was characterized by Liam Croft of Push Square as "witty" and by Christopher Holler, writing for PC Games, as "charming and full of humor". Several reviewers also enjoyed the game's writing, with Rachel Samples of Dot Esports describing the storyline as a "silly but heart-wrenching narrative" and Marcel Vroegrijk of Gamer.nl praising its authenticity. On the other hand, Holler found the story overly simplistic.

Critics praised the artwork, animations, map, and worldbuilding of Crypt Custodian. Echo Apsey of Nintendo Life liked the "diverse environments", adding that the game created a "memorable world and aesthetic". Writing for PC Gamer, Shaun Prescott enjoyed the game's distinctive art style, comparing it to that of early-to-mid-20th-century cartoons, and praised the "modern fluidity" of its animations. Though the large size of Crypt Custodian's map was positively received, Prescott also criticized the repetitiveness of its different areas, which he said differed only superficially. Croft also called the differences between different areas "mostly just cosmetic". However, he also said that "they all feel distinct enough with varied colours, enemy types, and overall themes", with Vroegrijk agreeing that "the different areas each have their own distinct character".

Reviewers who enjoyed Crypt Custodian's gameplay noted it as smooth and fast-moving. Croft liked how the in-game abilities helped "[ensure] you always have something new to consider or test in previously explored areas", though he found some of them confusing at first. He also enjoyed the responsiveness of the controls and the game's simple base combat mechanics, which he said were supplemented by its upgrades and special attacks. Apsey also liked Crypt Custodian's combat foundation, as well as the game's build customizability. However, they criticized its sharp difficulty swings and the bullet hell components, which they found "overwhelming" and visually cluttered. Prescott also named Crypt Custodian's bullet hell fights as its most difficult element. Vroegrijk praised the combat as favoring the player's reaction speed over luck.

Wald liked the "satisfying sense of accomplishment" Crypt Custodian provided, and enjoyed how the difficulty of the game could be adapted to suit each player's individual abilities. Vroegrijk found the game occasionally difficult, but enjoyed the consistent simplicity throughout. Conversely, Samples found Crypt Custodian too easy, calling the difficulty "lacking", and thought the level design was too simple. Prescott also found the game to be relatively easier compared to similar games. He thought it was "mostly low stress", though less innovative and boring at times.

Crypt Custodian's soundtrack has been described by Croft as "chill", while Prescott called it "Boards of Canada-esque". Apsey thought it was innovative and said it "manages to balance being haunting (to fit the fact that Pluto is dead), whimsical, and catchy". Overall, Apsey called Crypt Custodian a "pretty traditional Metroidvania". Vroegrijk said it was "not revolutionary" and said not to "expect groundbreaking ideas", an idea echoed by Samples. Called a "charming Zelda meets metroidvania game" in the official description, Crypt Custodian has also been likened to Hyper Light Drifter (2016), Death's Door (2021), Hollow Knight (2017), Animal Well (2024), and Tunic (2022). Reviewers called it an introductory game ideal for players new to the Metroidvania genre. Crypt Custodian was nominated for Game of the Year at the 2024 Indie Game Awards.
