= Fast Racing Neo =

2015 video game

- Developer: Shin'en Multimedia
- Publisher: Shin'en Multimedia: JP: Arc System Works
- Artist: Martin Sauter
- Series: Fast
- Platform: Wii U
- Release: Nintendo eShop: EU/NA: 10 December 2015; AU: 11 December 2015; JP: 22 December 2015; Retail: EU: 30 September 2016; AU: 1 October 2016
- Genre: Racing
- Modes: Single-player, multiplayer

Fast Racing Neo (stylized as FAST Racing NEO) is a racing video game developed by Shin'en Multimedia and released worldwide for the Wii U in December 2015 via the Nintendo eShop, with a retail release in September 2016 in Europe and Australia only. It is the second entry in the Fast series, being the sequel to Fast Racing League. It is often compared to Nintendo's F-Zero franchise. Martin Sauter from Shin'en Multimedia said in an interview with Nintendo Life that the game's Hero Mode was inspired by F-Zero.

Fast Racing Neo received generally positive reviews from critics. A sequel, Fast RMX, was released for the Nintendo Switch on 3 March 2017 as a launch title for the system.

== Gameplay ==
Fast Racing Neo is played using the left stick to steer, A to accelerate, B to brake, X or L to change phases, (colors between blue and orange) ZL and ZR to lean (drift) left and right respectively. Changing phases comes into play when, during a race, either blue or orange set pieces of the track are driven on. You would then change phases respective of the color to get a speed boost if done correctly. There are also phase boost pieces that will give you a boost through the air, or on to another part of the track. (I.e. over a gap.)

== Reception ==
Reception

Aggregate score
Aggregator	Score
Metacritic	81/100

Review scores
Publication	Score
Destructoid	9/10
Hardcore Gamer	4/5
Nintendo Life	9/10

Fast Racing Neo received "generally favorable" reviews, according to video game review aggregator website Metacritic.

Dermot Creegan of Hardcore Gamer gave the game a 4 out of 5 saying, "FAST Racing NEO is challenging and riveting enough to keep players busy for a long while, whether driving solo or with friends." Laura Kate Dale from Destructoid rated the game a 9/10 saying, "Fast Racing Neo made a strong impression right off the bat, and is easily one of my favorite games this year."

DLC for the game was released on September 30, 2016, including 8 new tracks and 10 new vehicles. A retail version of the game, including the DLC, was released, exclusive to Europe and Australia as a part of Nintendo's eShop Selects series.
