= Achievement (video games) =

Meta-goal in a video game

An example of a notification that a player might receive for completing an achievement

In video gaming, an achievement (or a trophy) is a meta-goal defined outside a game's parameters, a digital reward that signifies a player's mastery of a specific task or challenge within a video game. Unlike the in-game systems of quests, tasks, and/or levels that usually define the goals of a video game and have a direct effect on further gameplay, the management of achievements usually takes place outside the confines of the game environment and architecture. Meeting the fulfillment conditions, and receiving recognition of fulfillment by the game, is sometimes referred to as unlocking the achievement.

== Purpose and motivation ==
Achievements are included within games to extend the title's longevity and provide players with the impetus to do more than simply complete the game but to also find all of its secrets and complete all of its challenges. They are effectively arbitrary challenges laid out by the developer to be met by the player. These achievements may coincide with the inherent goals of the game itself, when completing a standard milestone in the game (such as achievements for beating each level of a game), with secondary goals such as finding secret power-ups or hidden levels, or may also be independent of the game's primary or secondary goals and earned via completing a game in an especially difficult or non-standard fashion (such as speedrunning a game [e.g., Braid] or playing without killing any enemies [e.g., Deus Ex: Human Revolution and Dishonored]), playing a certain number of times, viewing an in-game video, and/or beating a certain number of online opponents. Certain achievements may refer to other achievements—many games have one achievement that requires the player to have gained every other achievement.

Unlike secrets, which traditionally provided some kind of direct benefit to the player in the form of easier gameplay (such as the warp pipe in Super Mario Bros.) or additional gameplay features (such as hidden weapons or levels in first-person shooters like Doom) even though they might have criteria similar to achievements in order to unlock, the narrative-independent nature of achievements allows them to be fulfilled without needing to provide the player with any direct, in-game benefit or additional feature. In addition, the achievements used in modern gaming are usually visible outside the game environment (on the Internet) and form part of the online profile for the player. These profiles include: Gamertag for Microsoft's Live Anywhere network, combining Xbox 360/Xbox One/Xbox Series X|S titles, PC games using Games for Windows – Live and Xbox Live on Windows 8 and Windows 10, and Xbox Live-enabled games on other platforms; PSN ID for PlayStation Network (PSN); User Profile Achievement Showcases for Steam; Armory Profiles for World of Warcraft; and Lodestone Profiles for Final Fantasy XIV. Mobile devices also have achievements: For Android devices Google Play Games and iOS devices Apple Game Center.

The motivation for the player to gain achievements lies in maximizing their own general cross-title score (known as Gamerscore on Live, Trophy Level on PSN, and the Achievement Showcase for Steam User Profiles) and obtaining recognition for their performance due to the publication of their achievement/trophy profiles. Some players pursue the unlocking of achievements as a goal in itself, without especially seeking to enjoy the game that awards them—this community of players typically refer to themselves as "achievement hunters", though those who deride players only playing games to earn and unlock trophies term them by the term "achievement whores".

Some implementations use a system of achievements that provide direct, in-game benefits to the gameplay, although the award is usually not congruent with the achievement itself. One example of such an implementation are "challenges" found in the multiplayer portions of the later Call of Duty titles. Challenges here may include a certain number of headshots or kills and are rewarded not only with the completion of the achievement but also a bonus item that can be equipped. Team Fortress 2 features 3 milestones for each of the nine classes. When a milestone is reached by obtaining a specific number of achievements for each class, the player will be awarded a non-tradable weapon unique to that class.

== Origins and implementations ==
=== Single-game achievements ===
The idea for game achievements can be traced back to 1982, with Activision's patches for high scores. This was a system by which game manuals instructed players to achieve a particular high score, take a photo of score display on the television, and send in the photo to receive a physical, iron-on style patch in a fashion somewhat similar to the earning of a Scout badge. This system was set up across many Activision titles regardless of platform, and though most of their games were on the popular Atari 2600, games on the Intellivision, ColecoVision, Atari 5200, and at least one title on the Commodore 64 also included similar instructions with patches as a reward. Patches would be sent with a letter from the company, often written as if from a fictional character, like Pitfall Harry, congratulating the player on the achievement. By the end of 1983, Activision's new games no longer included these achievements, but the company would still honor the process for their older games.

The game E-Motion on the Amiga from 1990 was one of the earliest games that had some form of achievements programmed into the game itself. The game called these "secret bonuses". The game had five such bonuses, for achievements such as completing a level without rotating to the right, or completely failing certain levels. A number of individual games have included their own in-game achievements system, separate from any overall platform. Most modern massively multiplayer online role-playing games have implemented their own in-game system of achievements; in some cases such as World of Warcraft and Final Fantasy XIV, these achievements are accessible outside the game when viewing user profiles on the game websites and the game may offer an API for achievement data to be pulled and used on other sites.

=== Platform (multi-game) achievement systems ===
Although many other individual games would develop their own "secret bonuses" and internal achievements, the first implementation of an easily accessible and multi-game achievement system is Microsoft's Xbox 360 Gamerscore system, introduced at E3 in 2005, and implemented on the 360's launch date (22/11/05). Microsoft extended Gamerscore support to the Games for Windows – Live scheme in 2007 by including support for Achievements in Halo 2.

In 2007, Valve became the second company to release a multi-game achievement system for their Steam digital storefront, eventually capturing a wide number of PC games, including Mac games.

In 2008, Sony followed suit by offering Trophies for the PlayStation 3. There was no Trophy support for the PlayStation Portable, even though the device does have PSN connection capability. Trophies became mandatory for new games from January 2009. By 2011, the successor to the PlayStation Portable, the PlayStation Vita, and all PlayStation Vita games had universal support for the Trophy system, as well as the later PlayStation 4 and PlayStation 5 and their games.

Apple added achievements to Game Center on October 12, 2011, with the release of the iOS 4, for mobile platform for iPhone, iPad, and iPod Touch. Achievements are available on Android via Google Play Games.

Microsoft's mobile OSes, Windows Phone 7 and Windows Phone 8, included Xbox Live support, including Achievements when first launched worldwide on October 21, 2010.

Amazon Kindle provided the GameCircle service starting July 11, 2012, which tracks achievements and leaderboards for some games adapted to the Kindle platform. In October 2022, Amazon shut down access to GameCircle.

Kongregate, a browser games hosting site, features Badges, which earn the user points, similar to Xbox Live's Gamerscore and PlayStation Network's Trophy system. Much like PSN's Trophies, points work towards increasing a player's level. The site FAQ explains, "Your level will automatically rise as you earn points. We're still working out the details of what kind of privileges and potential prizes that points and levels could be used to unlock."

In 2012, RetroAchievements started to retroactively add achievements to old game-systems for use in Emulation software like RetroArch. Users add indicators which trigger when a certain value changes in emulating the ROM.

=== Game achievements as satire ===
The advent of achievement-driven gaming was satirized in the Flash game Achievement Unlocked. The game is a simple platformer; it takes place on a single non-scrolling screen, and has only simple walking and jumping controls. It has no clearly defined victory condition aside from earning all 100 achievements, from the trivial ("move left", "click the play field") to the complex ("touch every square", "find and travel to three particular locations in order"). The game spawned two sequels.

=== Achievements as part of gamification ===
NSA information-gathering program XKeyscore uses achievements awarding "skilz" points to assist in training new analysts as a form of gamification of learning.

== See also ==
- Unlockable (video games)
- New Game Plus
