= John Cooney (video game developer) =

Video game developer

- Born: 1986 or 1987 (age 38–39)
- Other name: jmtb02, Wonderful Elephant
- Occupation: Game designer
- Website: www.wonderfulelephant.com

John Cooney (born 1986 or 1987), also known by his pseudonyms jmtb02 and Wonderful Elephant, is an American game developer and former chief executive officer of Armor Games. He is best known for his numerous Flash games, many of which feature a blue elephant as the player avatar, including Achievement Unlocked and This is the Only Level.

== Life and career ==
Cooney got into development of Flash games during high school. While enrolled at University of California, Davis, Cooney kept developing games and founded his own game development company, JMTB02 Studios. The money he earned through his games were enough to pay for his college tuition. In 2007, Cooney joined Armor Games as their first employee. In 2012, he joined Kongregate, where he stayed until rejoining Armor Games in 2019 as the vice president of business development of Armor Games Studios. In 2017, JMTB02 Studios rebranded to Wonderful Elephant. In September 2021, Cooney became the CEO of Armor Games. In May 2023, Armor Games announced that they would be publishing The Elephant Collection, a compilation of several of Cooney's Flash games. The following month, he announced that he would be stepping down as CEO.

== Games ==
- Achievement Unlocked (2008)
- Achievement Unlocked 2 (2010)
- Achievement Unlocked 3 (2012)
- AngleBeat
- Argent Burst
- Ball Revamped (2004)
- Ball Revamped 2: Metaphysik (2005)
- Ball Revamped 3: Andromeda (2005)
- Ball Revamped 3: Gemini (2005)
- Ball Revamped 4: Amplitude (2006)
- Ball Revamped 5: Synergy (2007)
- Balloon in a Wasteland
- Chuck the Sheep
- Coinbox Hero
- Color Keys
- Compulse
- Console Launch: Second Shipment
- Cooper's Little Adventure
- Corporation Inc.
- Dark Cut
- Dark Cut 2
- Dark Cut 3
- Elements
- Elephant Quest
- Elephant Rave
- Ellipsis
- Epic Combo!
- Epic Combo Redux
- Exit Path (2010)
- Exit Path 2 (2011)
- Extreme Missile Defense X-treme 3D
- Five Til
- Flock Together
- Four Second Firestorm
- Four Second Frenzy
- Four Second Fury
- Fox Fyre
- Frontier
- Giraffe Attack
- Give Up (2013)
- Grid16
- Hedgehog Launch 2
- I Hate Traffic
- I Love Traffic
- Knights of Rock
- Light Cut
- Llama Adventure
- LOOT The Game
- Luminara
- Maverick
- Medieval Golf
- Mr. Walter's Grand Excursion
- Obey The Game
- Obsessive Compulse Tournament
- Ocean Explorer
- Parachute Retro
- Parachute Retrospect
- Pocket Change
- Rabbit Wants Cake
- RedEye 1031
- Run Elephant Run
- Run Right
- Scribble
- Scribble 2
- Scribble States
- Sixty
- Soviet Rocket Giraffe Go Go Go!
- Spectrum Genesis
- Spin Doctor
- Squeezed
- Super Mafia Land
- TBA
- TBA Two
- The Next Floor
- This is the Only Level (2009)
- This is the Only Level Too
- This is the Only Level 3 (2012)
- Timemu
- Treadmillasaurus Rex
- TwoThree
- Warp Shot
