= Never Give Up (video game) =

2019 platforming video game

- Developers: Massive Monster; Tasselfoot
- Publisher: Armor Games
- Engine: Unity
- Platforms: Windows; macOS; Linux; Switch
- Release: August 13, 2019
- Genre: Platform
- Mode: Single-player

Never Give Up is a 2D platform game developed by Massive Monster and Tasselfoot and published by Armor Games on August 13, 2019. The game follows a stick figure man named Blue who awakes in a strange facility and tries to escape it. The main gameplay consists of several level "sets", each of which contain several increasingly difficult iterations on the same level. The game is a reboot of the Give Up series, also published by Armor Games, and includes full voice acting by Arin Hanson of Game Grumps.

== Gameplay ==
Never Give Up is divided into different worlds each containing different levels leading up to a boss battle. The levels consist of several versions of the same basic room layout, increasing in difficult as the player progresses through them by adding additional hazards and lengthening the level. After dying enough times within a level, players can skip past it by selecting a "give up" option.

== Reception ==
Reception

Aggregate score
Aggregator	Score
Metacritic	NS: 78/100

Review scores
Publication	Score
Nintendo Life	7/10
Nintendo World Report	9/10

Never Give Up was received generally well by critics. It was praised for its difficulty and the satisfaction of overcoming its challenges, although critics noted its lack of originality and its tendency to be outdated.
