= Don't Escape: 4 Days to Survive =

2019 video game

- Developer: Mateusz Sokalszczuk
- Publisher: Armor Games
- Series: Don't Escape
- Platforms: Windows, macOS
- Release: March 11, 2019
- Genres: Adventure, survival
- Mode: Single-player

Don't Escape: 4 Days to Survive is a 2019 point-and-click adventure survival video game set in a post-apocalypse scenario, developed by Polish indie developer Mateusz Sokalszczuk (also known by his online handle scriptwelder) and published by Armor Games. The game uses a pixel art style, and received positive reviews from critics. The game was originally titled Don't Escape: 4 Days in a Wasteland, but it was renamed due to a potential trademark issue with inXile Entertainment's Wasteland series.

== Gameplay ==
The game revolves around surviving a series of disasters that are thrown at the player character, a man named David, as well as a group of allies, named Catherine, Cody and Barry. The end goal is reaching a rocket ship and escaping the Earth, which is on the verge of destruction as a result of the Moon breaking into pieces and crashing down to Earth due to a disastrous attempted mining operation. The game has multiple endings.

== Plot ==
The game's plot can be open-ended as it has multiple branching paths, so this plot description is for the most common outcome from a typical playthrough.

On March 11, 1996, the Moon was rocked by a large explosion that caused visible cracks to appear on its surface. The cause was later attributed to a mining operation set up by the megacorporation Sidereal Plexus. Over the next several months, the Moon split into two, and its orbit began to decay towards Earth. The change in tidal forces as the Moon moved towards Earth caused multiple catastrophic natural disasters that destroyed civilization. By the time the game begins, there are only a handful of survivors scattered across the planet, surviving through various means.

David, a lone survivor, has prophetic nightmares that seem to warn him of oncoming threats for the next day. After another ominous nightmare, David sees an omen on the horizon and traverses a vast desert before arriving at an abandoned farm home. Given the home's decent condition and availability of resources nearby, he decides to use it as a shelter.

On the second day, David has another prophetic dream warning of an inclement climate disaster and is awakened by a helicopter crashing into the roof. The pilot, Cate, informs David that she has a plan to escape the apocalypse for good, which involves taking a rocket up to a space station, all of which were owned by Sidereal Plexus. Suspicious of her knowledge but left with no better alternative, he agrees to help her. During their exploration of the local area for resources, they recruit Barry, a grieving widower, and Cody, an orphaned 10-year old, into their group.

At the start of the third day, Cate informs David that they need to search an abandoned Sidereal Plexus office in an abandoned city in order to uncover information about the location of the shuttle launchpad. The group reaches the building, but an accident from the decaying infrastructure causes Barry (or Cody, depending on the player's choice) to fall and perish. David uncovers the needed intel, and the group survives the night.

On the fourth day, the group makes it to the launchpad and spends the day gathering resources to make the rocket launch successful. Cate explains that their goal is a space station on the Moon, but withholds additional information; eventually, the group launches into orbit. On the Moon base, Cate explains Sidereal Plexus's sleeping pod technology, which allows its users to transfer their memories and consciousness across parallel universes into another body on another Earth; even if their bodies perish here, they would effectively survive. However, the pods are currently not operating at optimal capacity, meaning their escape to a safe world won't be guaranteed. With both the moon and space station now breaking apart, the group decides to use the sleeper pods anyway.

David then wakes where he did at the start of the game, a broken Moon back in the sky, commenting on the strangeness of his dreams. He ends up living out the same four days over again, but this time with a strong sense of deja vu. At the end of the second day, David is visited in his dream by either Barry's late wife (if Barry died previously) or Cody's tiger plush (if Cody died previously). Both warn him of the oncoming threat to Barry/Cody. Armed with this knowledge, David is able to keep everyone alive by the end of the third day. Their survival helps David access additional Sidereal resources that can boost the sleeping pod's performances.

After reaching the Moon station again, David briefly discusses with Cate his dreams and what has changed because of them. The group then uses the sleeping pods again. This time, everyone is sent to a world where Sidereal Plexus cancelled their Moon mining operations, thus averting the apocalypse. While David casually opens up a newspaper on the street, Cate is at a café trying to track him down. Elsewhere, Barry and his now-alive wife prepare to adopt Cody. As the game ends, the four look up to the intact full Moon, reminiscing on the disaster they had miraculously escaped.

== Reception ==
Don't Escape: 4 Days to Survive received positive reviews from critics. Cultured Vultures described it as "superb" and "a unique, well made survival game", while Games Industry described it as "one of the best point and click adventures that we have played in a very long time", and praising the game's puzzle system, while also providing more muted opinions on the game's graphics and sound. Dave Lambden of Handsome Phantom praised the game's timing mechanic and described its pixel art style as "simple but charming", while finding that the game made some problems obvious to figure out. The game received awards at both the Digital Dragons and Pixel Havens events, which are festivals devoted to indie games.
