= Islets (video game) =

2022 video game

- Developer: Kyle Thompson
- Publisher: Armor Games Studios
- Designer: Kyle Thompson
- Programmer: Kyle Thompson
- Artist: Kyle Thompson
- Composer: Eric Thompson
- Platforms: Windows, Nintendo Switch, Xbox One, Xbox Series
- Release: WW: 24 August 2022
- Genre: Action
- Mode: Single-player

Islets is a 2022 video game developed by Kyle Thompson and published by Armor Games Studios for Windows, Nintendo Switch and Xbox. Upon release, the game received generally positive reviews.

== Gameplay ==
In-game screenshot

The game is a metroidvania in which players assume the role of Iko, a mouse that explores islands in the sky. Players can dodge, roll, swing a sword and fire arrows. Collecting tokens upon completing platforming or combat challenges provides the player with a random permanent upgrade, such as increasing health or the fire rate of arrows. When players explore an island and locate its magnet, it will join to the main island on the map, allowing the player to reach new areas.

== Development ==
Islets was created by Portland, Oregon-based American independent developer Kyle Thompson, who previously created the title Sheepo. Thompson was influenced by indie metroidvania titles, including the "atmosphere and narrative" of the games of Maddy Thorson and the 2007 title Knytt Stories. Developed over a two-year timeframe, Islets was announced on 11 July 2021, following a deal signed with publisher Armor Games, and was released on 24 August 2022.

Islets received a limited run physical release for the Switch published by Super Rare Games on 9 March 2023.

== Reception ==
Reception

Aggregate score
Aggregator	Score
Metacritic	82/100

Review scores
Publication	Score
Nintendo World Report	9/10
TouchArcade	4/5
VG247	4/5
Screen Rant	7/10
TheGamer	3/5

Islets received "generally favorable" reviews from contemporary critics, according to review aggregator Metacritic.
