= Nanostray 2 =

2008 video game

- Developer: Shin'en Multimedia
- Publisher: Majesco
- Engine: C-Engine
- Platform: Nintendo DS
- Release: NA: March 11, 2008; AU: September 12, 2008; EU: October 9, 2008
- Genre: Scrolling shooter
- Modes: Single-player, multiplayer

Nanostray 2 is a scrolling shooter video game for the Nintendo DS, and is the sequel to the original Nanostray. The game was released in 2008.

== Plot ==
Taking place in the future, the supply ship E.S.S. Ariga is returning from its latest voyage when the awakening crew is alerted by a three-year-old distress call. The colonized area the Ariga is returning to has been contaminated by a techno-virus known as Nanostray. According to the distress call, the Nanostray virus had infected the colonist technology from computers to war-machines and made each one hostile. A flight commander has been assigned to win back the infested areas and, with the help of Officer Diane Stewart aboard the Ariga, discover and destroy the source of the Nanostray virus.

== Gameplay ==
Addressing the complaints many had with tacked-on touchscreen features, Nanostray 2 boasts three control schemes – classic control, left-handed touch control, and right-handed touch control, classic being the default scheme. The classic scheme employs the A and B buttons for primary and secondary weapons, the D-pad for movement, and the shoulder buttons (L and R) to change satellite drone placement. The touch control scheme employs the stylus/touch screen for movement, the D-pad or face buttons for use of the primary weapon, and the shoulder buttons for use of the secondary weapon. Like the previous game, gameplay focuses more on graphics quality rather than touch-screen control. Customization is now a key part of the experience: at the start of a level, players have the ability to adjust which special weapons they'll take into the fight, alter the angle of their side-mounted guns as they get mounted on the front, sides and rear of the ship, and even the ship's sensitivity to D-pad commands. Besides the main single-player mode, Nanostray 2 also has a Challenge mode, where players can try to get a set number of points, collect a set number of coins, or survive for a specific time limit.

=== Modes ===
- Adventure – new to the Nanostray series is a developed story and voice acting. Apparently, 'Nanostray' is a virus that infects and controls machines for malicious purposes, and you must collect samples and seek more information on the virus. To unlock other features, the player must first play through Adventure mode. Each level cleared in the Adventure mode is made available in the Arcade mode, and one or more challenges are added to the Challenge mode. After clearing the first stage (Teppeki Dock), the game allows the player to play the next three stages (Kaikan Outpost, Naizoh Habitat, and Shinkai Bay) in any order. The player can then do the same with the following three stages (Daitoshi Station, Kigan Belt, and Kohai City). After those stages have been cleared, then the final stage (Himuro Base) is unlocked. However, if the player runs out of lives or continues, then they must start back at the first level.
- Arcade – in Arcade mode, the objective is to score as many points as possible in the 'hard' difficulty. Stages in Arcade mode are unlocked after they are played in Adventure mode. A player's high scores can be downloaded via the Nintendo Wi-Fi Connection to online leaderboards.
- Challenge – four groups of challenges, eight strong each, are presented to the player. Challenges force the player to end the stages with different conditions, for example, reaching a minimum score, surviving a set amount of time, collecting a certain number of coins, etc.
- 2-Player – the game's multiplayer mode is limited to play between two players in multiplayer cooperative (multi-card) and duel modes, both of which are played locally. The game also has single-card download capability, with two modes available.
- Simulator – for each group of challenges cleared, one mini-game is unlocked in Simulator mode. These mini-games include Nanobreak, Nanogrid, Nanorush, and Nanotorque.

=== Weapons ===
Players are limited to selecting which of six subweapons they would prefer. The primary weapon remains constant throughout gameplay, being a repeating laser bolt which can be augmented by satellites. Subweapons have different abilities, acting as lasers, mines, or remotely detonated devices. Each subweapon has a different power requirement, which draws from a limited supply on the player's ship. The power supply is replenished by collecting blue energy coins throughout a level.

== Reception ==
Reception

Aggregate score
Aggregator	Score
Metacritic	75/100

Review scores
Publication	Score
Edge	7/10
Electronic Gaming Monthly	5.83/10
Game Informer	7.25/10
GamePro	4/5
GameSpot	8/10
GameSpy	4/5
GameTrailers	7.8/10
Hardcore Gamer	4/5
IGN	8.1/10
Nintendo Power	6/10
Nintendo World Report	8/10
Pocket Gamer	3/5

Nanostray 2 received "generally favorable reviews" according to the review aggregation website Metacritic. Some reviewers praised features such as the 3D graphics and solid gameplay, and others criticized the still-awkward-though-completely-optional touch-screen controls and unusual positions of save points between levels. GameSpot praised it as "a dyed-in-the-wool shoot-'em-up that offers great action in a shiny, proficient package", while lamenting its "D pad controls [as] too sluggish" and its "Disappointing single-card play". IGN praised the game's graphics as "impressive...even the title screen" while lamenting its "enemy and vehicle design [as] uninspired. Game Informer gave the game an above-average review, while Electronic Gaming Monthly and Nintendo Power gave it mixed reviews, a few months before the game was released Stateside.
