= Fast RMX =

2017 video game

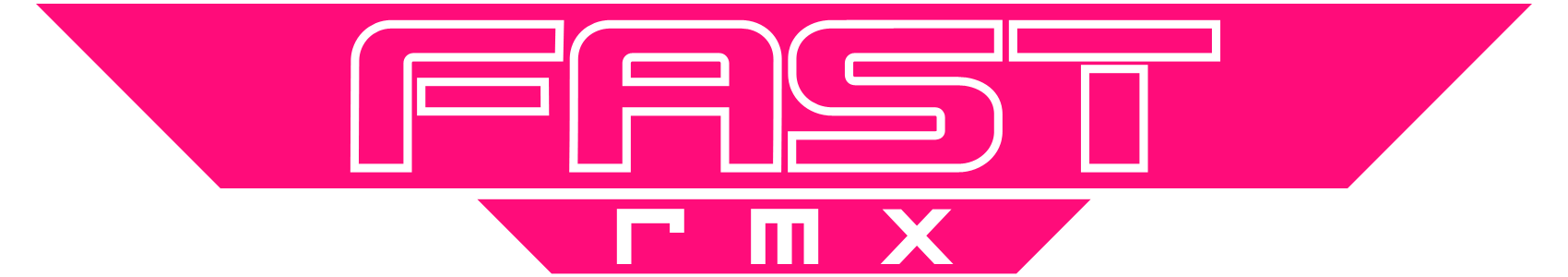
- Developer: Shin'en Multimedia
- Publisher: Shin'en Multimedia
- Series: Fast
- Platform: Nintendo Switch
- Release: WW: 3 March 2017
- Genre: Racing
- Modes: Single-player, multiplayer

Fast RMX (stylized as FAST rmx) is a 2017 racing video game developed and published by Shin'en Multimedia for the Nintendo Switch. The third installment in the Fast series, it is the sequel to Fast Racing Neo. The game was released on 3 March 2017 on the Nintendo eShop as a launch title for the console.

Fast RMX includes all the courses and downloadable content from the original game, Fast Racing Neo, in addition to 6 new courses for a total of 30 courses, but with shorter Grand Prix than the original. An additional free update was released on 13 September 2017, which added 6 extra courses, for a total of 36. The game received a limited edition physical release on 13 October 2022, via Super Rare Games.

A sequel, Fast Fusion, was released in June 2025.

== Gameplay ==
Like most racing video games, players must reach the end of a track as soon as possible. Unique to the Fast series is the polarity mechanic, where players collect boost energy by switching between two colors. Each color has respective boosts and jump pads, which can only be used if a player is currently its respective color. Upon completing a race, players are rewarded a number of points, depending on which place of 8 they finished in. At the end of a cup, the player must rank in the top 3 of racers to unlock the next cup. The player has 12 cups of 3 courses available, with only 3 cups to choose from at the beginning of the game. The game can also be played online with up to 4 players locally and up to 8 players online.

The game features a single-player campaign with 10 cups to unlock, containing 30 courses total, along with 15 unlockable vehicles. The game also contains multiplayer components, featuring split-screen multiplayer mode for up to 4 players, as well as local communication and online modes with 2-8 players. Another extra mode called Hero Mode is available, using the same tracks as the campaign with higher difficulty and with the boost meter doubling as a health bar, similarly to games in the F-Zero franchise.

== Development ==
The game fully supports the unique control options and features of the Nintendo Switch, such as HD Rumble, motion controls, single Joy-Con play, and the Nintendo Switch Pro Controller. The game is capable of running in up to 1080p at 60FPS in docked mode.

The game was released on 3 March 2017, for the Nintendo eShop as a launch title for the Nintendo Switch. It was announced on 5 March 2017, that, like its predecessor, the game would be receiving free updates with extra content in the future. The first major update was released on 19 April 2017. It was confirmed to include a Time Attack mode and online friend support. An additional free update was released on 13 September 2017, which added 6 extra courses, improved AI, fixed bugs, and added friend list activity features.

A physical edition of the game was released on 13 October 2022. It was distributed by Super Rare Games and was limited to just 4,000 copies.

== Reception ==
Reception

Aggregate score
Aggregator	Score
Metacritic	81/100

Review scores
Publication	Score
Computer Games Magazine	9/10
Destructoid	8.5/10
Electronic Gaming Monthly	3/5
GameRevolution	7/10
GameSpot	7/10
Hardcore Gamer	3.5/5
IGN	7.4/10
Nintendo Life	9/10
Nintendo World Report	9/10
Pocket Gamer	4/5
Shacknews	8/10

Like the game's predecessors, Fast RMX is often compared to the games of the F-Zero and Wipeout series.

On Metacritic, the game holds a Metascore of 81 out of 100 points, based on 54 reviews. Nintendo Life gave the game a 4.7/5, praising the game's diverse selection of vehicles and tracks. IGN rated the game with 7.4 out of 10 points, describing it as a "[...] racer that borrows heavily from the classic Wipeout and F-Zero games." The website praised the game's AI, variety of courses and its graphical presentation, though the online mode was criticized for its lack of custom functions and not featuring a lobby system. Red Bull praised the game's scope, graphics, and price. The game received criticism for its heavy rubber banding.
