= Armor Games =

American video game publisher

Armor Games Inc.
- Logo used since 2017
- Company type: Incorporation
- Website type: Host for web games, game publisher
- Available in: English
- Founded: fl. March 2004; 22 years ago (as Games Of Gondor); October 2005; 21 years ago (under current name)
- Headquarters: Irvine, California, United States
- Founder: Daniel McNeely
- CEO: John Cooney (2021–2023); Daniel McNeely (2004–2021)
- Industry: Video games
- Website: armorgames.com
- Registration: Optional
- Current status: Active

Armor Games Inc. is an American video game publisher and free web gaming portal. The website hosts over a thousand HTML5 (and previously Flash) browser games. Based in Irvine, California, the site was founded in 2004 by Daniel McNeely.

Armor Games primarily hosts curated HTML5/JavaScript games and MMOs, sometimes sponsoring their creation. Each game is uploaded and maintained by its original developer, and some include unlockable player achievements. Users can chat within the site and create online profiles.

== History ==
Armor Games was founded by Daniel McNeely in 2004, and was originally branded as Games of Gondor. In October 2005, it rebranded to today's current name of Armor Games.

On March 3, 2019, Armor Games revealed that they had a data breach in 2019 and that the database was sold on the Dream Market.

In December 2020, nearing end-of-life of Adobe Flash, the site announced that it would be using the Ruffle emulator for its Flash content, although many Flash games remain inaccessible.

In August 2024, Armor Games laid off an unknown number of staff from its publishing team, Armor Games Studios.

== Notable sponsored games ==
- Aether
- Coil
- Crush the Castle
- Detective Grimoire: Secret of the Swamp
- Don't Escape: 4 Days to Survive
- Fancy Pants Adventures
- GemCraft
- Kingdom Rush
- Shift
- Warfare 1917
- Waterworks!
- Fireboy and Watergirl
- Super Drift 3D

== Armor Games Studios ==
Under the name Armor Games Studios, the company has developed and published indie games for Steam, mobile devices, and consoles.

| Title | Developer(s) | Release date | Platform(s) |
|---|---|---|---|
| The World's Hardest Game | Snubby Land | March 21, 2008 | Microsoft Windows, MacOS, iOS |
| Cursed Treasure 2 | IriySoft | September 24, 2014 | Microsoft Windows, macOS, Linux, iOS, Android |
| GemCraft - Chasing Shadows | Game in a Bottle | April 20, 2015 | Microsoft Windows |
| Super Chibi Knight | PestoForce | June 24, 2015 | Microsoft Windows, macOS, Linux |
| Soda Dungeon | Afro-Ninja Productions | October 7, 2015 | Microsoft Windows, iOS, Android |
| Sentry Knight Tactics | Tyler Myers, Justin Wolf | October 3, 2016 | Microsoft Windows, macOS |
| Sonny | Krin Juangbhanich | January 12, 2017 | Microsoft Windows, macOS, iOS, Android |
| The Big Journey | Catfishbox | March 16, 2017 | iOS, Android |
| Pinstripe | Atmos Games | April 25, 2017 | Microsoft Windows, macOS, Linux |
| The Adventure Pals | Massive Monster | April 3, 2018 | Microsoft Windows, macOS, Nintendo Switch, Xbox One, PlayStation 4 |
| Infectonator 3: Apocalypse | Toge Productions | May 10, 2018 | Microsoft Windows, macOS, iOS, Android |
| Love is Dead | Curiobot | May 31, 2018 | Microsoft Windows, macOS |
| Sushi Cat Words | Krin Juangbhanich | July 25, 2018 | iOS, Android |
| Crush the Castle: Siege Master | UYAVA | October 18, 2018 | iOS, Android |
| Zombotron | Ant.Karlov | April 22, 2019 | Microsoft Windows, macOS |
| Swords & Souls: Neverseen | Soul Game Studio | June 5, 2019 | Microsoft Windows, macOS, Nintendo Switch |
| Chook & Sosig: Walk the Plank | TookiPalooki | June 17, 2019 | Microsoft Windows, macOS |
| Void Tyrant | Quite Fresh | June 26, 2019 | iOS, Android |
| Don't Escape Trilogy | scriptwelder | July 29, 2019 | Microsoft Windows |
| Never Give Up | Massive Monster | August 13, 2019 | Microsoft Windows, macOS, Nintendo Switch |
| Nauticrawl | Spare Parts Oasis | September 16, 2019 | Microsoft Windows, macOS |
| Deep Sleep Trilogy | scriptwelder | October 25, 2019 | Microsoft Windows |
| ITTA | Glass Revolver | April 22, 2020 | Microsoft Windows, Nintendo Switch |
| Jet Lancer | Vladimir Fedyushkin | May 12, 2020 | Microsoft Windows, macOS, Nintendo Switch |
| SOLAS 128 | Amicable Animal | January 19, 2021 | Microsoft Windows, Nintendo Switch |
| A Rogue Escape | Spare Parts Oasis | June 10, 2021 | Microsoft Windows, Oculus Rift |
| The Last Stand: Aftermath | Con Artist Games | November 16, 2021 | Microsoft Windows, PlayStation 4, PlayStation 5, Xbox One, Xbox Series X/S |
| LumbearJack | FinalBoss Games | July 11, 2022 | Microsoft Windows, Nintendo Switch |
| LumbearJack | FinalBoss Games | July 14, 2022 | Xbox One, Xbox Series X/S |
| Bear and Breakfast | Gummy Cat | July 28, 2022 | Microsoft Windows, Nintendo Switch |
| The Spirit and the Mouse | Alblune | September 26, 2022 | Microsoft Windows, Nintendo Switch |
| Islets | Kyle Thompson | August 24, 2022 | Microsoft Windows, Nintendo Switch, Xbox X/S |
| The Tartarus Key | Vertical Reach | May 31, 2023 | Nintendo Switch, PlayStation 4, Windows, Xbox One, Xbox X/S |
| Elephant Collection | Wonderful Elephant (jmtb02) | November 6, 2023 | Microsoft Windows |
| In Stars and Time | insertdisc5 | November 20, 2023 | Microsoft Windows, Nintendo Switch, PlayStation 4, PlayStation 5 |
| Bilkins' Folly | WebbySoft | October 2, 2023 | Microsoft Windows, Nintendo Switch, PlayStation 4, PlayStation 5 |
| Snacko | Bluecurse Studios | Dec 6, 2023 | Microsoft Windows, Nintendo Switch, PlayStation 4, PlayStation 5 |
| Baladins | Seed by Seed | May 15, 2024 | Microsoft Windows |
| Kamaeru: A Frog Refuge | Humble Reeds | Jun 8, 2024 | Microsoft Windows |
| Defender's Quest 2: Mists of Ruin | Level Up Labs | January 30, 2025 | Microsoft Windows, Nintendo Switch, PlayStation 4, PlayStation 5 |
| Deep Sleep: Labyrinth of the Forsaken | scriptwelder | August 21, 2025 | Microsoft Windows |

== Reception ==
PC Magazine listed it in 2007 as one of the Top 100 undiscovered websites. The American news station KSTU listed it as one of the 10 websites that they considered the best for finding "free online games".
