= Nanostray =

2005 video game

- Developer: Shin'en Multimedia
- Publishers: NA: Majesco; EU: THQ
- Platform: Nintendo DS
- Release: NA: July 19, 2005; EU: February 10, 2006
- Genre: Scrolling shooter
- Modes: Single-player, multiplayer

Nanostray is a vertically scrolling shooter for the Nintendo DS. The user takes control of a futuristic spacecraft against a horde of enemies. A sequel, Nanostray 2, was released in 2008.

== Gameplay ==
Basic gameplay consists of first defeating waves of many small enemies and then greater, stronger enemies. When all enemies in a wave are destroyed, a blue powerup that restores the power weapon bar is released. Enemies can also release coins when destroyed, worth some points. At the end of each level there is a boss that represents the theme of the level.

The game has three difficulty settings; Normal, Advanced, and Expert. Each progressive level diminishes the lives, energy, continues, and smart bombs replenished after the player loses a life. The Nintendo DS touch screen is used for boss scanning, radar, and weapon management.

=== Weapons ===
There are four different types of weapons. The weapons range in projectile type from a basic forward-shooting laser, to a weapon that only shoots to the side, to a forcefield generator. Additionally, each weapon has a limited-use special attack, which, in essence, is a mightier version of the weapon's attack.

=== Modes ===
There are four game modes to play: Adventure, Arcade, Challenge, and Multiplayer.

- Adventure: To unlock other features, the player must first play through adventure mode. Each level cleared in the Adventure mode is made available in the Arcade mode, and one or more challenges are added to the Challenge mode. The game allows the player to play the first three stages (Mitsurin Jungle, Mokuzu Depths, and Sunahara Desert) in any order. After these three stages are cleared, the player can do the same with the following three stages (Hibashira Plains, Sekihi Belt, and Sekai Outpost). Then the player must clear Chuuroh City to reach the final stage, Zenshoh Station.
- Arcade: The objective is to score as many points as possible in advanced difficulty. When a stage is cleared, a passcode is generated, which can be entered in the official site to create an account and be ranked.
- Challenge: A total of 22 challenges are presented. Challenges force the player to end the stages with different conditions, in example, a minimum score, without smart bombs, without using the sub weapon, with only one life, etc. Each beaten challenge adds a new "extra". Extras include background music, concept art, etc.
- Multiplayer: Two players can compete in four different modes: 120s (play during 120 seconds, at the end of the time the player with the highest score wins), 60s (idem 60), 25k (the first player to reach 25,000 points wins) and Bonus Race (all destroyed enemies release coins, the player who gets the most after 120 seconds wins). Since Nanostray supports wireless single card download, only one cartridge is needed to play.

== Reception ==
Reception

Aggregate score
Aggregator	Score
Metacritic	71/100

Review scores
Publication	Score
Edge	5/10
Electronic Gaming Monthly	5/10
Eurogamer	7/10
Famitsu	(C+A) 30/40; 27/40
Game Informer	8/10
GameSpot	6.5/10
GameSpy	2.5/5
GameZone	7/10
IGN	8/10
Nintendo Power	8/10
Nintendo World Report	7.5/10
Retro Gamer	65%
The Times	3/5

The game received "mixed or average reviews" according to the review aggregation website Metacritic. Most reviews focused on the impressive quality of the graphics. In Japan, where the game was ported and published by Taito under the name Danshaku (弾爵 -ダンシャク-) on January 26, 2006, Famitsu gave it a score of three sevens and one six, while Famitsu Cube + Advance gave it a score of two eights and two sevens.
