= ABA Games =

Japanese video game developer

- Industry: Video games development
- Headquarters: Tokyo, Japan
- Key people: Kenta Cho
- Number of employees: 1
- Website: asahi-net.or.jp/~cs8k-cyu/

ABA Games is a Japanese video game developer, consisting solely of game designer Kenta Cho. ABA Games' works, available as open source, are predominantly shoot 'em up games often inspired by classic games in the genre. Its games feature stylised retro graphics, innovative gameplay features and modes and feature random rather than scripted events. These creations have been acclaimed as some of the best independent games available, though some commentators, including Cho himself, feel they are too simple for commercial release.

Cho began creating computer games as a hobby during his childhood in the 1980s. After leaving university, he pursued a career with Toshiba in multimedia research and development while continuing to develop games in his spare time. The positive reaction to ABA Games' first shoot 'em up for Windows, Noiz2sa (2002), encouraged him to concentrate on that genre. The developer's games have been ported from the original Windows versions to macOS and Linux, and various handheld devices. One of its games, Tumiki Fighters, was remade, built upon and released for the Wii console as Blast Works. According to Cho, he occasionally receives interest in further console ports. In addition to Tumiki Fighters, acclaimed ABA Games titles include Gunroar, rRootage and Torus Trooper.

== Overview ==
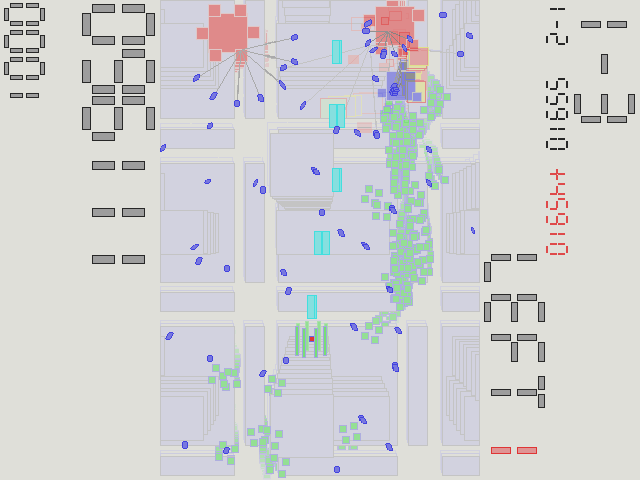
Noiz2sa, ABA Games' first shoot 'em up for Windows

ABA Games' sole developer, Kenta Cho, began writing games as a child during the 1980s using the NEC PC-6001 microcomputer, as there were few commercially available games. After leaving university, Cho contemplated professional games development but ultimately instead joined Toshiba to work in multimedia research and development. He continues to work full-time for Toshiba while running ABA Games as a hobby, working mainly on weekends. Cho is the sole contributor to ABA Games. Lacking musical training, he creates the soundtracks to his games using commercially available, pre-made samples. ABA Games releases a game approximately every six months, with the first three months spent creating prototypes and the latter three spent refining a finished version.

ABA Games released its first shoot 'em up game for Windows PCs—Noiz2sa—in 2002, and the positive feedback Cho received encouraged him to concentrate on the genre. ABA Games' creations are "avant-garde" re-imaginings of classic arcade shoot 'em ups, using modern 3D graphics techniques to emulate older vector graphics and employing "imaginative, fresh" gameplay ideas. According to Cho, his graphical style was inspired by the game Rez as well as street billboards, and his attempts at innovative gameplay features have been inspired by games such as Radiant Silvergun, Ikaruga and Gradius V. ABA Games' works also tend to be set in random rather than scripted events. Its games are developed for Windows, but some have been ported to other systems including macOS, iPhone, iPod Touch, and PSP, with its game Tumiki Fighters forming the basis of Wii game Blast Works (which included a selection of his games as bonus content). Cho has also created BulletML, an open source program which can replicate bullet patterns from other shoot 'em up games.

Cho has stated he occasionally receives interest in ports for game consoles, but although he would otherwise be interested in such ports, he feels his games are too simple for commercial release. He has also stated his use of the D programming language proved problematic when porting Tumiki Fighters to the Wii. ABA Games' works are open source and free to download; Cho has stated he creates games of the kind which he desires to play and distributes them (along with the source code) for the enjoyment of others without the intent of monetary profit. Macworld acclaimed Cho as "spectacularly talented" and "one of today’s best independent game programmers", while GamesRadar noted him for "creating some of the best freeware shoot ‘em ups out there". Ashcraft states that in the West, Cho is "hailed as the most famous 'doujin software' shmup maker", while The Guardian claimed Cho's works are among "the best-known examples" of Japan's independent gaming scene. While out with Japan ABA Games is known as a "doujin" developer, unlike doujin developers Cho does not seek to sell his works, nor are they fan-created games; however, Cho is affable to the term being applied to his work. Jessica Mak, creator of award-winning game Everyday Shooter (published by Sony on PlayStation Network) has cited ABA Games' Parsec 47 as the inspiration behind her game's aesthetic.

== Games ==
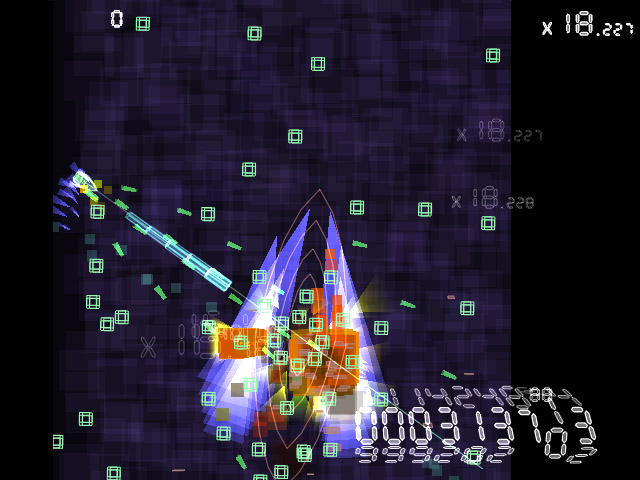
Gunroar is an abstract, naval themed shoot 'em up game.

- Gunroar is a naval themed shoot 'em up likened to a vertically scrolling version of Geometry Wars (or a cross between Asteroids and Space Invaders). The player controls a small, abstract gunboat which can be rotated through 360 degrees as in games such as Geometry Wars and Robotron. The game also features vertical scrolling; however, unlike the standard shoot 'em up in which the propulsion of the craft dictates the pace, players can control the speed at which they proceed through the level. The faster players move through a level, the more points they will score. The game features multiple modes dependent on how the game is controlled: the player can choose to control a single boat by means of the keyboard or mouse or a more complicated "dual" mode allowing the use of two boats using both hands on the keyboard. Gunroar was praised for its minimalist design, impressive polygonal graphics, and frenetic action.

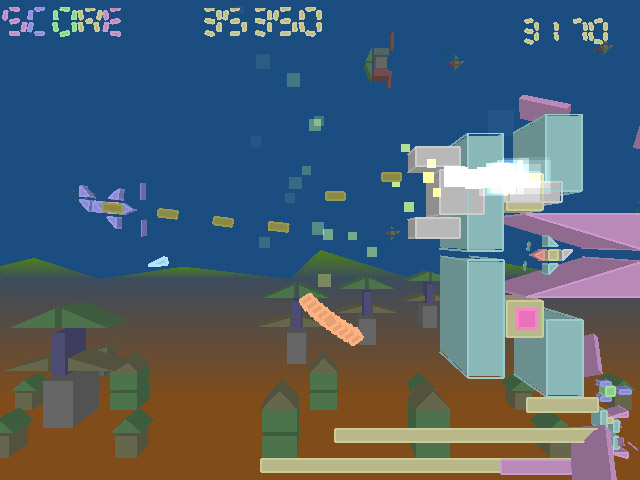
Tumiki Fighters, a side-scrolling shooter, was remade as Blast Works: Build, Trade, Destroy for the Wii console.

- Tumiki Fighters is a side-scrolling shooter in which the protagonist is a toy aeroplane flying through a cartoon setting. The game employs a device inspired by Katamari Damacy, allowing the player to attach debris from destroyed enemies to the aircraft, which in turn act as armour and power-ups. Praised for its addictive gameplay, Tumiki Fighters formed the base of Blast Works: Build, Trade, Destroy, a game published by Majesco in 2008 for the Wii. Developer Budcat Creations remade ABA Games' creation for the console and further added an editor function allowing extensive user-created content. Critics acclaimed Blast Works for its innovative and entertaining gameplay and has been described by critics variously as an upgraded version or remake— or simply a port or re-release— of Tumiki Fighters. Blast Works featured Tumiki Fighters, as well as three other ABA Games titles, as bonus content. UGO felt that these games' minimalist graphics, while not outstanding, did retain some charm. According to Cho, he did not receive money for the port, allowing his game to be used for free.
- rRootage is a shoot 'em up viewed from a top-down perspective, composed solely of boss battles against large abstract spacecraft attacking the player with intricate barrages of projectiles. The game featured multiple modes: "normal", "Psy", "Ika" and "GW"; the latter three inspired by Psyvariar, Ikaruga and Giga Wing, respectively. The game was ported to the iPhone and iPod Touch by developer Lahzrog Games and released as a free download on iTunes. GamesRadar described the game as "great" and "full of win". Macworld acknowledged the game was esoteric but praised its "classic fast paced action", awarding it a maximum five stars. However, the reviewer noted the iPhone version sometimes ran more slowly than intended.
- Torus Trooper, a reimagining of the game Tempest, features a spacecraft flying through an abstract tunnel, the walls of which twist and change shape. The player competes against the clock, gaining more time by destroying enemies. The game was acclaimed for its stark yet highly attractive graphics, and was featured in the 2010 book 1001 Video Games You Must Play Before You Die.
- Titanion is a vertical shooter acclaimed for its attractive graphics.
- Mu-cade is heavily based on Namco's Motos
- Noiz2sa is an abstract "bullet hell" shooter, a sequel to the earlier Java games Noiz and Noiz2 and a predecessor to Parsec47.

== Reception and impact ==
As Kenta Cho usually releases the source code of his games under a BSD-like permissive license, his games are often ported by volunteers to other systems. For example, Tumiki Fighters written in D and released in 2004, was included in the Linux distribution Debian and also ported to Pandora handheld.
