= F-14 Tomcat (video game) =

2001 video game

- Developer: Virtucraft
- Publisher: Majesco
- Platform: Game Boy Advance
- Release: September 2, 2001
- Genre: Action game
- Modes: Single-player, multiplayer

F-14 Tomcat is a 2001 action video game released for the Game Boy Advance developed by Virtucraft and published by Majesco. It is an enhanced port of Turn and Burn: No-Fly Zone for the SNES. Two other games for the Game Boy Advance, Super Hornet F/A 18F and F24: Stealth Fighter were built on the same game engine.

== Gameplay ==
F-14 Tomcat is an arcade-style flight combat game in which players pilot a fighter jet over an endless ocean, engaging in aerial dogfights and missile evasion across more than a dozen missions. Each mission follows a pattern: fly to a designated point, eliminate enemy targets, and fend off waves of MiGs. The game's challenge lies in maneuvering through heat-seeking missiles and locking onto foes. Visuals shift subtly from day to dusk, but the terrain remains unchanged—sky and sea every mission. Landing the jet is simplified to a matter of throttle control and following on-screen prompts. The game introduces semi-3D effects and allows players to switch camera views during combat. A brief FMV clip plays when missiles hit. Multiplayer is supported via link cable, enabling up to four players to engage in oceanic dogfights.

== Reception ==
Reception

Aggregate score
Aggregator	Score
Metacritic	67%

Review scores
Publication	Score
GameSpot	7.2/10
GameSpy	87%
IGN	60%

F-14 Tomcat received mixed reviews from critics. The game holds a 67% rating on Metacritic.

IGN rated the game a 6 of 10, stating "...what's here is cool, if a bit vanilla. Controls are tight, graphics are clean, the missions are challenging, and the link cable mode works like a champ. But this game is only good in single shots due to the fact that the missions don't offer any variety".

GameZone rated the game a 4.5 of 10 praising the sound and difficulty while criticizing the gameplay, graphics and multi-player.
