= Morning Star Multimedia =

American video game company

Morning Star Multimedia was an American video game company founded in October 1995. It was acquired by the Telegen Corporation in 1996. It was known for releasing Frogger for the Sega Genesis when Majesco re-released the console in 1998 (known as the Genesis 3). Its last game was released in 2000, so it is unknown whether it is still in the video game industry today. Employees of the company left to form two gaming studios. Half of them went to the Majesco-led Pipe Dream Interactive, while the other half went to OutLook Entertainment, Inc., which developed three games for Game Boy Advance.

== Games released ==
=== PC ===
- Weight Trackers Plan and Track (1997, developed)
- Kristi Yamaguchi Fantasy Ice Skating (1998, developed)
- Casper: The Interactive Adventure (1998, developed)

=== Sega Genesis ===
- Frogger (1998, developed)

=== SNES ===
- Frogger (1998, developed)

=== Game Boy Color ===
- Super Breakout (1998, developed)
- Frogger (1998, developed)
- Centipede (1998, published)
- Monopoly (1999, published)
- Black Bass: Lure Fishing (1999, developed)
- 10 Pin Bowling (1999, developed)
- Tom and Jerry (1999, developed)
- Battleship (1999, developed)
- Missile Command (1999, developed)
- Deer Hunter (1999, developed)
- Tonka Raceway (1999, developed)
- Pong: The Next Level (1999, developed)
- NASCAR Challenge (1999, developed)
- F-18 Thunder Strike (2000, developed)
- NFL Blitz 2001 (2000, developed)
- Frogger 2: Swampy's Revenge (2000, developed)
- Ultimate Paintball (2000, developed)

=== Game Boy ===
- Centipede (1998, published)
- Frogger (1998, published)
- Super Breakout (1998, developed)
- 10-Pin Bowling (1998, unpublished)

=== Game Gear ===
- Frogger (unpublished)
- Ten-Pin Bowling (unpublished)
