= Boxing Fever =

2001 video game

- Developer: Digital Fiction
- Publisher: Majesco
- Platform: Game Boy Advance
- Release: NA: October 12, 2001; EU: February 15, 2002
- Genre: Boxing
- Modes: Single player, multiplayer

Boxing Fever is a boxing video game developed by Digital Fiction and published by Majesco for the Game Boy Advance. It was released in North America on October 30, 2001, and in Europe on February 15, 2002.

Boxing Fever is a first person boxing game, portrayed from the perspective of the player's fighter. Multiplayer is supported through the link cable. Boxing Fever received positive reviews from critics, who noted its creative visual style.

== Gameplay ==
The player fights an opponent.

The game gives the player the perspective of the fighter, in a first person view; the graphical engine gives the illusion of 3D. The user punches and blocks with the d-pad, while avoiding punches entirely by weaving with the shoulder buttons.

There are four championships for the player to complete in throughout the course of gameplay; all of them are available from the start of gameplay and do not need to be earned through performance in the game. Boxing Fever lacks a battery save feature, and instead uses an 8-digit password system.

== Reception ==
Reception

Aggregate score
Aggregator	Score
Metacritic	76/100

Review scores
Publication	Score
AllGame	4.5/5
Eurogamer	7/10
Game Informer	7/10
GamePro	4/5
GameSpot	6.1/10
GameZone	8.4/10
IGN	8.5/10
Nintendo Power	3.5/5
Nintendo World Report	9/10
X-Play	3/5

The game received "generally favorable reviews" according to the review aggregation website Metacritic. Praise for the game focused on its graphics and its control scheme. IGN's Craig Harris spoke positively of the game's graphical design and frantic pace; he awarded the game an IGN Editor's Choice Award and compared the game to the Punch-Out!! series by Nintendo. Eurogamer's Tom Bramwell felt the game successfully carried on the Punch Out!! legacy on the Game Boy Advance, and was favorable of the game's animation. GameZone's Michael Lafferty noted that game felt realistic.

Criticism of the game focused mostly on the repetitive nature of the fights, the password save system, and the little amount of content found in the game. GameSpot's Ryan MacDonald felt that the control scheme for Boxing Fever caused the game to feel repetitive, and he lamented the lack of a battery save system. Bramwell called the password save system "atrocious" and negatively compared it to the system found in GT Advance Championship Racing.

== See also ==
- Black & Bruised
