= Ultimate Paintball =

2000 video game

- Developer: Morning Star Multimedia
- Publisher: Majesco
- Programmers: Tak Lau; Chi Chan
- Artists: Mike Sullivan; Richard Mather
- Composer: Scott Marshall
- Platforms: Game Boy Color, Game Boy Advance
- Release: Game Boy Color: NA: September 2000; EU: 2000; Game Boy Advance: NA: Unreleased
- Genre: First-person shooter

Ultimate Paintball is a video game for the Game Boy Color which was released in 2000.

It was developed by Morning Star Multimedia and published by Majesco. It was released in September 2000 in North America and in 2000 in Europe for the Game Boy Color.

The game was planned to be released on the Game Boy Advance at some point, but it was ultimately cancelled. The developer was supposed to be Pipe Dream Interactive, Majesco's in-house development company.

The game was distributed by Take-Two Interactive in Europe.

== Gameplay ==
You start the game with 5 life bars and 9 paintball grenades. The goal is to shoot your paintballs at all the enemies in a first-person view without getting shot too many times. There is also a top-down view as the player controls his character on a map. Rarely, you will get a power-up where it adds half a life bar or an extra paintball grenade. Sometimes, you will get a random minigame where you shoot paintball bombs thrown at you. It was one of the many games on the Game Boy Color to use a password system. Essentially, the game is capture the flag. You press A to shoot and B to throw a grenade which, when thrown at the same spot an enemy is, will eliminate them. Shooting them (with one shot as that's all that's needed) will also eliminate them. When encountering an area with enemies (which is random), the game automatically switches from a top-down view to the first-person view. In the area with enemies, an arrow will guide you in knowing your enemy's location. After defeating a horde of enemies, an arrow will appear on the spot where you had encountered the enemies, giving the player a small hint at where the flag is located.

== Staff ==
Executive Producer- David Elmekies

Producers- Dan Kitchen, Kevin Mitchell

Programmers- Tak Lau, Chi Chan

Graphics- Mike Sullivan, Rich Mather

Composer- Scott Marshall

Tester- Robert Prescott

== Reception ==
The game received a negative review from IGN receiving a 2 out of a perfect score of 10. The game received a 5.8 out of a possible ten from Nintendo Power and a 2 out of 5 from EAGB Advance.
