= F-18 Thunder Strike =

2000 video game

- Cover art
- Developer: Morning Star Multimedia
- Publisher: Majesco
- Platform: Game Boy Color
- Release: 30 July 2000
- Genre: Combat flight simulator
- Mode: Single-player

F-18 Thunder Strike is a 2000 action game for the Game Boy Color developed by Morning Star Multimedia and published by Majesco. The game is a simplified first-person combat flight simulator in which the player operates a F-18 Hornet for the United States Air Force, who have has confirmed reports of renewed hostile activity in the Balkans and order an aerial assault on the region.

== Gameplay ==
A screenshot of F-18 Thunder Strike, depicting the cockpit interface.

The game is a combat flight simulator that places players in the cockpit of an F-18 Hornet. The interface includes control panels, a heads up display to target enemies and a radar and landing system. The game involves takeoff and landing, maneuvering, mid-air refueling, and dogfighting over a series of missions.

== Development ==
The game was originally developed as an adaptation of any of MicroProse's flight simulators, before it was adapted into an original title, which was originally released in 1999.

== Reception ==
Reception

Review scores
Publication	Score
AllGame	1/5
Hyper	4/10
IGN	2/10
Total Game Boy Color	28%
Game Boy Xtreme	49%

F-18 Thunder Strike received unanimously negative reviews, with criticism of the game focused on the poor controls and slow pace of the gameplay. Craig Harris of IGN said that "the problem with this game is the overall design", levelling criticism with the controls as "extremely simplified...the controls of your plane are flat-out wrong (and) actually causes some seriously stupid problems with the dogfighting that makes it near impossible to target your opponents properly". Writing for Hyper, Frank Day stated the game was "not a good idea", observing "the small screen and stiff digital controls" leads the player to "look for enemy planes for a long time before you see any action". Total Game Boy Color agreed, critiquing the "impersonal and slow" gameplay in which "nothing happens...you simply fly around for a while, shoot a plane or two if you're luck and then you turn it off".

== See also ==
- Turn and Burn: The F-14 Dogfight Simulator
