= 10-Pin Bowling (video game) =

1999 video game

- Developer: Morning Star Multimedia
- Publisher: Majesco
- Platform: Game Boy Color
- Release: August 1, 1999
- Genre: Sports

10-Pin Bowling is a bowling video game developed by Morning Star Multimedia and published by Majesco for the Game Boy Color. Originally announced for Game Boy before shifting development to the newer system, 10-Pin Bowling is one of few Game Boy Color games to support rumble, which is achieved by utilizing a rumble pak built directly into the cartridge.

== Gameplay ==
10-Pin Bowling starts with minimal setup for one or two players, then straight into a standard ten-frame bowling match. To bowl, players align an arrow to choose their position, then hold the A button to activate a shot bar. As the bar fills, players control the ball's speed and curve. Releasing the button before it hits the red zone is crucial, or it counts as a foul.

== Development ==
The game was developed by Morning Star Multimedia, a company founded in 1995.

== Reception ==
Reception

Review scores
Publication	Score
All Game Guide	2.5/5
IGN	4/10
Video Games (DE)	4/15

Craig Harris, writing for IGN, described the game as "entirely basic and stripped down" and opined that it was "as basic as you can get on the Game Boy." In their review, German magazine Video Games was critical of the lack of variety of gameplay between the two game modes, the limited controls, and lack of accompanying music. The reviewer concluded that the game was "for extreme freaks only".

All Game Guide said "Overall, this is a fair title that should have had more features. With at least two other bowling games available for the system, gamers are advised to shop around a bit first".
