= Top Gear Pocket =

1999 video game

- North American box art
- Developer: Vision Works
- Publishers: JP/EU: Kemco; NA: Vatical Entertainment
- Series: Top Gear
- Platform: Game Boy Color
- Release: NA: March 30, 1999; JP: April 23, 1999; EU: 1999
- Genre: Racing
- Modes: Single-player, multiplayer

Top Gear Pocket, (Note: Japanese: トップギア・ポケット, Hepburn: Toppu Gia poketto) known in Europe as Top Gear Rally, is a racing video game developed by Kemco and released for the Game Boy Color handheld console in 1999. A sequel, Top Gear Pocket 2, was released in 2000.

== Gameplay ==
The player races against a computer-controlled opponent. The player's position and best time are shown at the top of the screen.

Top Gear Pocket is a racing video game where the player drives rally cars through a series of tracks. As the player wins races, new cars and tracks are unlocked. The game features a total of 14 cars and eight tracks. Races can take place in cities, savannas, grasslands, and snowy trails. Both two-wheeled and four-wheeled cars are featured in the game and the handling of each car varies significantly. The game cartridge features a built-in rumble feature that vibrates when the player crashes into other cars or slides on the track, but does not feature a battery to save the game progress, so passwords must be used to restore the game to a specific state. The game also includes a multiplayer mode where two players can race against each other. The Game Link Cable is required for multiplayer.

== Release and reception ==
Reception

Aggregate score
Aggregator	Score
GameRankings	63%

Review scores
Publication	Score
AllGame	3/5
Computer and Video Games	3/5
Game Informer	6/10
GameSpot	5.3/10
IGN	7/10
N64 Magazine	3/5
Nintendo Power	5.1/10
Consoles +	89%
Nintendo Acción	60/100

Top Gear Pocket was the first Game Boy Color game to introduce a rumble feature in North America. In Europe, the game was released as Top Gear Rally. Critical reception for the game was generally mixed. N64 Magazine criticized it for its lack of challenge and variety, stating that tracks are "either a mixture of looooong straights or fairly simple curves", but highlighted its graphics and sense of speed. In contrast, Computer and Video Games felt that the game was very challenging, stating that players might get both frustration and joy in equal measure. IGN remarked that the graphics are sharp and clear and that the game "creates a very realistic feeling of movement".

The French video game magazine Consoles + praised the game's rumble feature, stating that it enhances the gameplay experience significantly. The Spanish official Nintendo magazine Nintendo Acción agreed, but criticized the car handling and their small size.
