= Top Gear Pocket 2 =

1999 video game

- North American box art
- Developer: Vision Works
- Publishers: JP: Kemco; NA: Vatical Entertainment; EU: Kemco
- Series: Top Gear
- Platform: Game Boy Color
- Release: JP: December 17, 1999; NA: January 30, 2000; EU: 2000
- Genre: Racing
- Modes: Single-player, multiplayer

Top Gear Pocket 2, (Note: Japanese: トップギア・ポケット2, Hepburn: Toppu Gia poketto Tsū) known in Europe as Top Gear Rally 2, is a racing video game developed by Kemco and released for the Game Boy Color handheld console, released on December 17, 1999 in Japan and in 2000 across other regions. It is a sequel to Top Gear Pocket.

== Gameplay ==
The player tries to overtake a computer-controlled opponent.

Top Gear Pocket 2 is racing video game where the player drives rally cars through closed-circuit courses. The player starts in the last position and must overtake a number of opponents controlled by the game's artificial intelligence before crossing the finish line on the last lap. Points are awarded to the player depending o the position they finish a course. These can be used to buy or upgrade cars, which have four attributes: acceleration, top speed, handling, and braking. The game also includes a multiplayer mode where two players can race against each other. The Game Link Cable is required for multiplayer.

== Development and release ==
Top Gear Pocket 2 was developed by Kemco as a sequel to Top Gear Pocket. The game uses an enhanced version of its predecessor's engine. Unlike its predecessor, the international version does not feature a built-in rumble feature (though the Japanese version does), but includes a battery which allows players to save their progress. Top Gear Pocket 2 was released on February 1, 2000 in North America. In Europe, the game was released as Top Gear Rally 2.

== Reception ==
Reception

Review scores
Publication	Score
AllGame	3.5/5
IGN	8/10
Nintendo Power	6.9/10
Planet Game Boy	85%
Nintendo Acción	85/100

Top Gear Pocket 2 received generally favorable reviews from video game publications. At the time of its release, IGN reviewer Craig Harris considered it one of the best racing games on the Game Boy Color, stating that the game had been "tweaked and refined as a quality racing game", and concluding that its increasing difficulty offers a proper challenge as players progress through the game. However, he criticized the multiplayer mode because of its "catch-up" feature, noting that the "only real challenge is trying to keep behind the other person and guess when the final stretch approaches so you can win".

AllGame criticized the car attributes for being unbalanced, noting that the top speed is the only one that has a significant impact on the gameplay, but still considered the game enjoyable to play due to its sensation of speed. The British video game magazine Planet Game Boy highlighted the game's speed and pace, especially as better cars are unlocked, while the Spanish official Nintendo magazine Nintendo Acción praised the graphic improvements over its predecessor, stating that the cars are more detailed and that sharp curves and elevation changes are better animated.
