= Budcat Creations =

American video game developer (2000–2010)

Budcat Creations, LLC
- Type: Subsidiary
- Industry: Video games
- Founded: September 1, 2000; 26 years ago
- Defunct: November 16, 2010; 15 years ago
- Headquarters: Iowa City, Iowa, U.S.
- Number of employees: 80
- Parent: Activision
- Website: budcat.com

Budcat Creations, LLC was an American video game developer based in Iowa City, Iowa, and was a wholly owned subsidiary of Activision, though they formerly had partnerships with Electronic Arts and Majesco. They were largely responsible for porting titles to non-target consoles. They had worked on a number of blockbuster gaming franchises, among them Guitar Hero, Madden NFL, and Medal of Honor. They also produced a few original titles, including Blast Works: Build, Trade, Destroy (2008) and The New York Times Crosswords (2007).

== History ==
Budcat was founded by Jason Andersen and Jonah Stich, who met on the precursor to AOL, via a shared interest in the Apple IIGS. A few months into the company's initial year, Isaac Burns joined as a partner. Isaac and Jason met in high school, in their hometown of Iowa City, Iowa.

The company went on to produce a string of sports titles for EA over the next five years, including entries in the NASCAR Thunder, NHL Hockey, and FIFA Manager series, as well as the PlayStation 2 version of Psychonauts for Majesco.

In 2005, Budcat moved to its ultimate location in Iowa City in order to facilitate expanding their offices. Budcat worked in partnership with Majesco, Electronic Arts, and Activision on multiple titles before being purchased by Activision Blizzard on November 10, 2008, where they mostly worked on the Guitar Hero brand.

Budcat Creations was shuttered by Activision Blizzard on November 16, 2010.

== Games ==
Release	Title	Platform	Publisher
2011	Top Shot Arcade	Wii	Activision
2010	Pix Maze	iOS	Activision
2009	Band Hero	PS2	Activision
2009	Our House Party	Wii	Majesco
2009	Guitar Hero: Metallica	Wii, PS2	Activision
2009	Guitar Hero 5	PS2	Activision
2008	Guitar Hero World Tour	PS2	Activision
2008	Guitar Hero: Aerosmith	Wii, PS2	Activision
2008	Blast Works: Build, Trade, Destroy	Wii	Majesco
2007	Guitar Hero III: Legends of Rock	Wii, PS2	Activision
2007	The New York Times Crosswords	NDS	Majesco
2007	Medal of Honor: Vanguard	Wii	Electronic Arts
2007	Arena Football: Road to Glory	PS2	EA Sports
2006	Nacho Libre	NDS	Majesco
2005	Madden NFL 06	PC	EA Sports
2005	Psychonauts	PS2	Majesco
2004	Total Club Manager 2005	Xbox, PS2	EA Sports
2004	Madden NFL 2005	PC	EA Sports
2003	Total Club Manager 2004	Xbox, PS2	EA Sports
2003	Madden NFL 2004	PS1, GBA	EA Sports
2003	NASCAR Thunder 2004	PS1	EA Sports
2002	NASCAR Thunder 2003	PS1	EA Sports
2002	Madden NFL 2003	PS1, GBA	EA Sports
2002	NHL 2002	GBA	EA Sports
2002	Desert Strike Advance	GBA	Electronic Arts
2001	Madden NFL 2002	PS1, N64, GBA	EA Sports
