= Fortress (2001 video game) =

- Developer: Pipe Dream Interactive
- Publisher: Majesco
- Platform: Game Boy Advance
- Release: NA: August 14, 2001; PAL: November 23, 2001
- Genre: Tower defense
- Modes: Single-player, multiplayer

Fortress is a tower defense strategy video game developed by Pipe Dream Interactive and published by Majesco for the Game Boy Advance (GBA) handheld game console. It originally released in North America in August 2001, and later in PAL regions on November 23, 2001. It was originally announced as Fortris for PlayStation and Dreamcast by developer Prometheau Games, but was acquired by Majesco and moved to the Game Boy Advance. The game has players building and defending their fortress against either another player or a computer using falling blocks to build it up and falling weapons to fight back against opponents.

Since its release, Fortress has received mixed reception, holding a 64 out of 100 on Metacritic.

== Gameplay ==
Fortress tasks players with creating a stronghold using pieces that fall from the sky. These pieces include both walls and weapons, which are used to defend from and attack opposing fortresses respectively. The game can be played single-player against a computer-controlled opponent or multiplayer against another player. It has multiple modes of play.

== Development ==
Fortress was originally announced in June 2000 as a PlayStation and Dreamcast game under development by Promethean Designs with the title "Fortris". In January 2001, Majesco announced that it had acquired the game, then titled "Fortres", alongside nine other titles for release on the GBA. The game was given a final name change the following month. Development moved from Promethean Designs to Pipe Dream Interactive, Majesco's internal developer. Majesco announced in July 2001 that Fortress was to be published in PAL regions by THQ as part of an international publishing deal between the two corporations.

== Reception ==
Reception

Aggregate score
Aggregator	Score
Metacritic	64/100

Review scores
Publication	Score
GamePro	4/5
GameSpy	60/100
IGN	6/10

Fortress received generally mixed reception, holding a 64 out of 100 on Metacritic. GamePro writer Stardingo felt that it was hard to control due to not being able to see your entire fortress, but still found the game fun to play. IGN writer Craig Harris felt the game was unfinished, though he appreciated some of its "clever ideas" and wished he could see a better version of it someday.
