= Bomberman Generation =

2002 video game

- North American cover art
- Developer: Game Arts
- Publishers: NA: Majesco; JP: Hudson Soft; PAL: Vivendi Universal Games
- Director: Kotaro Hayashida
- Producers: Hidetoshi Endo; Yoichi Miyaji
- Artists: Shoji Mizuno; Kozue Narai
- Composer: Shohei Bando
- Series: Bomberman
- Platform: GameCube
- Release: NA: June 4, 2002; JP: June 27, 2002; PAL: December 6, 2002
- Genre: Action-adventure
- Modes: Single-player, multiplayer

Bomberman Generation is a 2002 video game released for the GameCube. It was followed up by Bomberman Jetters.

== Gameplay ==
Bomberman Generation consists of six worlds consisting of about five levels each. The levels involve puzzles, mini games, Pokémon-like battles using Charaboms who get befriended by Bomberman once defeated, and Charabom or bomb merge areas where a merge item and a bomb get fused or a Charabom and another Charabom get fused resulting in a stronger bomb or Charabom. Pommy (Pomyu) from Bomberman 64: The Second Attack and a few of his variations make appearances as Charaboms. The worlds have unique bosses each with a different strategy of defeating them. All of the worlds have puzzles that the player has to solve with bombs or Charaboms. Bomberman can acquire various power-ups which can increase his speed and his bomb power.

Bomberman Generation was one of the first titles to employ the style of cel-shading for the GameCube, a style utilized again in the follow-up game Bomberman Jetters.

The multiplayer mode resembles that of the classic games in that the players can no longer utilize full three-dimensional movement. The battles can consist of up to four human or computer characters. There are five different modes from which to choose:

- Standard Battle: This mode consists of classic Bomberman multiplayer where four players attempt to defeat one another by using bombs. Whoever is the last man standing wins. In the last minute of the battle, blocks drop along the edges of the arena, making it smaller and smaller until someone wins or time runs out, which ends in a tie. This mode has a variety of levels from which to choose, and the player can decide how often the power-ups appear.
- Reversi Battle: Bomb explosions flip the green floor panels to the color of whichever Bomber dropped the bomb. However, opponents can flip the panels previously flipped by other players. Whoever has the most panels matching their corresponding Bomber when time is up is the winner.
- Coin Battle: By blowing up treasure barrels, players attempt to find the most coins before time runs out. Being killed causes the player to lose half of their coins. As the match progresses, Hige Hige Bandits appear to steal the coins, but blowing them up releases the coins and additional power-ups.
- Dodge Battle: Bombers cannot drop bombs; rather, bombs fall from the sky, and everyone must avoid the explosions. Bombers are equipped solely with Bomb Kicks, Punches, and Speed-Ups to avoid the blasts. The blast area of each bomb is shown on the arena floor. As the match progresses, a variety of different bombs and patterns of bombs will fall.
- Revenge Battle: All Bombers are in Revenge Bomber mode, and get points depending on how many moles they can stun or blow up. The bombs only go as far as the cursor allows, and merely stunning the moles with a bomb does not give the player as many points as making one explode.

== Plot ==
Six crystals are discovered in deep space, which give off a powerful unknown energy. On orders from Professor Ein, a space freighter begins transporting the crystals, dubbed the "Bomb Elements", back to Planet Bomber for analysis. While en route, the freighter is attacked and destroyed by a saboteur hired by Mujoe and his Hige Hige Bandits, and the Bomb Elements fall to the nearby planet Tentacalls. The Hige Hige Bandits form an alliance with the Crush Bombers, and the collective group head for the planet to retrieve the Bomb Elements. Fearing the damage even one Bomb Element could do in the wrong hands, Professor Ein orders Bomberman to Tentacalls to defeat the Crush Bombers and the Hige Hige Bandits, and to obtain the Bomb Elements first.

== Reception ==
Reception

Aggregate score
Aggregator	Score
Metacritic	81 out of 100

Review scores
Publication	Score
AllGame	3.5 out of 5
Electronic Gaming Monthly	8.33 out of 10
EP Daily	8 out of 10
Famitsu	27 out of 40
Game Informer	8 out of 10
GameSpot	8 out of 10
GameSpy	3.5 out of 5
GameZone	7.8 out of 10
IGN	8.1 out of 10
Nintendo Power	4.7 out of 5
Nintendo World Report	7.5 out of 10
X-Play	4 out of 5

Award
Publication	Award
Nintendo Power	Most Underrated Game of 2002

Bomberman Generation received "favorable" reviews according to the review aggregation website Metacritic. In Japan, Famitsu gave it a score of 27 out of 40. GamePro said that the game "delivers decent solo fun, but this game is best played with four friends hunched around the television, bent on trying to blow each other to smithereens." (Note: GamePro gave the game 4/5 for graphics, 3.5/5 for sound, and two 4.5/5 scores for control and fun factor.)

The game was nominated for "Best Platformer on GameCube" and "Best Game No One Played on GameCube" at GameSpot's Best and Worst of 2002 Awards, both of which went to Super Mario Sunshine and Sega Soccer Slam, respectively.
