= NASCAR Challenge =

1999 video game

- Developer: Morning Star Multimedia
- Publisher: Hasbro Interactive
- Platform: Game Boy Color
- Release: 15 November 1999
- Genre: Racing
- Modes: Single-player, Multiplayer

NASCAR Challenge is a 1999 video game for the Game Boy Color, developed by Morning Star Multimedia and published by Hasbro Interactive. The game is a NASCAR-licensed racing video game featuring three tracks from the NASCAR circuit. Upon release, the game received negative reviews, with publications criticizing the game's limited tracks, features, and poor attention to detail.

== Gameplay ==
A screenshot of NASCAR Challenge.

NASCAR Challenge is an arcade racing game with two modes. In 'Practice Mode', players can select one of three tracks, the Topeka Raceway, Sonoma Raceway, and Seneca Raceway, and choose to race one to six laps in automatic and manual transmission. In 'Race Mode', players complete a qualifying run and complete races against nine opponents, with a display depicting a speedometer, clock, lap counter, race position, gear and tire gauge. Players are required to complete a pit stop to replace their tyres to avoid reduced speed and handling. The game's cartridge features a built-in Rumble Pak that vibrates when the player crashes. Players can also use a local Game Link Cable to complete races with another player.

== Development ==
Hasbro Interactive announced the release of a licensed NASCAR game for the Game Boy Color in August 1999, with six tracks planned for the game, eventually limited to three upon release.

== Reception ==
Reception

Review scores
Publication	Score
AllGame	2.5/5 stars
GameSpot	5/10
IGN	2/10
Game Boy Xtreme	38%

NASCAR Challenge received a negative reception from reviewers upon release. Writing for GameSpot, Doug Trueman described the game as "dull" and "monotonous", finding the number of laps "much too long for a racer since there is little to do", and remarking that the "track is just too narrow" and the handling experiences "extreme deceleration when moving at anything less than top speed." Craig Harris of IGN dismissed the game as a "straight cash-in for name recognition only", observing the tracks feature a lack of detail with "not much variety" and a "plain and generic" graphics engine. Brad Cook of Allgame critiqued the lack of detail and depth, writing "there are a lot of little things that aren't done well in this game", citing problems with the game's interface, including the race position and speedometer. Cook stated "there isn't much potential for long-term play", noting the limited number of tracks in the championship and limited detail of the competing racers. Game Boy Xtreme described the game as "deathly dull", remarking "driving round in circles soon grates."
