= Super Strike Eagle =

1993 video game

- North American box art
- Developer: MicroProse
- Publishers: JP: Asmik Ace Entertainment; WW: MicroProse
- Designers: Dave A. Wagner; Steven J. Pujia
- Composers: Scott Patterson; Jeffery L. Briggs
- Series: F-15 Strike Eagle
- Platform: Super Nintendo Entertainment System
- Release: NA: March 1993; PAL: November 25, 1993; JP: November 26, 1993
- Genre: Air combat simulation
- Mode: Single-player

Super Strike Eagle is a 1993 combat flight simulation video game for the Super Nintendo Entertainment System. It was later released in Japan as F-15 Super Strike Eagle (Ｆ－１５スーパーストライクイーグル, F-15 Sūpā Sutoraiku Īguru).

The game involves flying airplanes that tests the player's Sidewinder missile and machine gun firing skills against various non-aligned nations that were historically notorious for housing extremist leaders during the Cold War. The game was released in North America, Europe, and Japan approximately simultaneously. In the Japanese version, real political flags are not used unlike the North American version.

== Gameplay ==
Once players have the enemy aircraft in their sights, they can go for the kill.

The main character in the game is a pilot flying for the United Nations whose sole objective is to bring various governments around the world back into cooperation with the UN. Each time a military campaign against a certain regime is completed, the flag of the nation in question is again raised at the United Nations Headquarters in New York City. Libya, Iraq, Cuba, and North Korea offer Soviet-manufactured aircraft like the MiG-27 and the MiG-29 for the player to in order to advance the war effort.

There are various types of targets in the game, including air, land and water targets in an environment that gives players permission to freely roam around the battlefield, limited only by the player's fuel supply. Land targets include nuclear power plants (but often include anti-air weapons and tanks); the player may suffer from radiation sickness after destroying nuclear plants from too close a distance. Radiation sickness must be healed using one of the player's limited sorties or it will become fatal. Weapons in the game include guns, missiles, electronic jammers, and bombs. Each mission on every war theatre consists of both mandatory and optional targets. It has been noted by gamers that all in-game weapons have the same explosion graphics, regardless of them being air-to-surface missiles or air-to-air missiles.

Players must also strategically plan which targets to destroy; destroying them in the wrong order may hinder the player.

Shooting the optional targets gives the player a higher score. Furthermore, destroying airfields, although not necessarily required to complete a mission, would stop opposing MiG-29 fighters from being ordered by the AI-controlled commander to destroy the player's aircraft. In the more advanced missions, players can shoot chemical weapons factories and terrorist camps for bonus points. Although the player's progress cannot be saved to the cartridge, there are a number of passwords the player can use to resume missions. Crashing the airplane and being killed in action will result in the flags (located at the United Nations building in New York) being lowered to half-staff. Dying in the game will also produce the playing of "Taps" while the world mourns the deceased pilot.

There is a practice round and then the player is thrown into real-life combat zones in order to test the skills learned in the practice round. Each combat zone is divided into a day level and a night level; day levels are considered to be an introduction while the night levels are considered to be the coup de grâce and allow the player to finish of the last of the dictator's defenses. Targets become progressively more difficult to destroy. Unlike most shooter games, the player only has one plane. If the player crashes, the game is over and a screen indicating the nations (if any) that were reclaimed by the player displays.

== Reception ==
Nintendo Power gave the game a rating of 3.45 out of 5 in their March 1993 issue of their magazine. Electronic Gaming Monthly gave the game a score of 65%.

== See also ==
- Super Air Diver
- Turn and Burn: No-Fly Zone
