= Dino Master =

2005 video game

- PAL box art
- Developer: Office Create
- Publishers: JP: Taito; NA/EU: Majesco
- Platform: Nintendo DS
- Release: JP: September 22, 2005; NA: May 24, 2006; EU: June 27, 2007
- Genre: Action
- Modes: Single-player, multiplayer

Dino Master (Note: Kyouryuu Taisen Dino Champ: Saikyou DNA Hakkutsu Daisakusen (Japanese: 恐竜対戦 ダイノチャンプ 最強DNA発掘大作戦, Hepburn: Kyouryuu Taisen Daino Chanpu: Saikyou Dii Enu Ee Hakkutsu Daisakusen; "Dinosaur Battle Dino Champ: The Greatest DNA Excavation Strategy") in Japan) is a game for the Nintendo DS system similar to a fusion of Pokémon and the arcade game Qix.

== Gameplay ==
The player takes the role of "Dave the Digger", who excavates fossils from various sites while avoiding enemies. The fossils can then be revived into living dinosaurs and pitted against each other in Battle Mode. To battle, the player would choose a part of the dinosaur to defend, and a part of the opponent dinosaur to attack. Smaller dinosaurs are weaker but have less vulnerability points; larger ones are stronger but have more vulnerability points. Powerful dinosaur are more rare to come by, and the player can dispose of the common kinds. In the story mode, the player traces a line across the field and any fossil concealed within the line is revealed. Enemies that collide with the line will send out a yellow "bullet" which will follow the line toward the player until it strikes or the player reaches an area of security. If the player collides with an enemy, the player loses a life. If an enemy is trapped within the line, that enemy is vaporized.

Several errors are in the game, such as the misnaming of dinosaurs. One error is the mislabeling of Plesiosaurus as Plateosaurus.

== Characters ==
Zenjiro
An elderly man who handles various dinosaurs.
Masato
A male youth who handles fast dinosaurs.
Nobuyuki
A researcher who handles dinosaurs with strong technique.
Lucy
A woman who handles dinosaurs with high HP.
Garcia
A gentle giant who handles aggressive dinosaurs.

Dinosaur list
The game includes up to 100 dinosaurs. They mostly consist of carnosaurs, sauropods, pterosaurs and sea reptiles (Pterosaurs and plesiosaurs are considered dinosaurs in the game, although in reality they are not).

Enemies
There are various enemies in Dino Master. They are mostly large spiders, insects, reptiles and crabs. There is always a "boss" enemy in each level, and if this boss is defeated, the player automatically wins.

== Reception ==
Dino Master received negative reviews on release. On Metacritic, the game holds a score of 28/100 based on 6 reviews.

Frank Provo of GameSpot rated the game a 2.4/10, citing its presentation as being equivalent to "an early generation Game Boy Advance game" and calling its controls "sluggish and unreliable." IGN's Craig Harris gave the game a 2.5/10 rating after criticizing it for its "ugly" graphics, "clunky" controls and ultimately calling it a "horrible, sloppy remake" of Qix.
