= Bomberman Jetters (video game) =

2002 video game

- North American cover art
- Developers: Hudson Soft; AI (GBA)
- Publishers: JP: Hudson Soft; NA: Majesco (GC)
- Directors: Mitsue Anzai; Tatsumitso Watanabe
- Producers: Tsunenari Yada; Shigeki Fujiwara
- Artist: Shoji Mizuno
- Composers: Hiro Kobayashi; Shohei Bando
- Series: Bomberman
- Platforms: PlayStation 2, GameCube
- Release: JP: December 19, 2002; NA: March 9, 2004 (GC)
- Genre: Action-adventure
- Modes: Single-player, multiplayer

Bomberman Jetters (Note: Japanese: ボンバーマン ジェッターズ, Hepburn: Bonbāman Jettāzu) is an action game for the GameCube and PlayStation 2, and part of Hudson Soft's Bomberman series. The game builds on the gameplay style established in the previous Bomberman series entry, 2002's Bomberman Generation, and features characters and settings from the 2002 anime series Bomberman Jetters. The GameCube version utilizes cel-shaded graphics similar to those of Bomberman Generation, while the PlayStation 2 version does not.

The game was released in Japan in December 2002. The GameCube version was originally scheduled to be released in the U.S. by Majesco on November 11, 2003, before it was delayed to March 9, 2004. The anime series' first title sequence appears as the game's opening cinematic, but the accompanying theme song "Boku wa Gakeppuchi" was omitted from the North American version.

== Plot ==
Mujoe and the Hige Hige Bandits, tired of White Bomber repeatedly stopping their plans for galactic conquest, enact a plan to destroy Planet Bomber and its inhabitants by crashing the Dark Star, Mujoe's artificial comet, into its surface. With only 24 hours until impact, White Bomber and MAX travel to the Dark Star to deactivate the engines propelling the comet and prevent Planet Bomber's destruction.

== Gameplay ==
=== Normal Mode ===
Gameplay is similar to the previous title, Bomberman Generation. Players control White Bomber and explore 3D environments, using different types of elemental Attribute Bombs to defeat enemies, solve puzzles and progress to the end of the stage. Players who fully explore each stage will often be rewarded with bonus collectibles such as health upgrades, new characters for use in multiplayer battles, and Charabom partners that augment White Bomber's abilities. Up to twelve different Charaboms can be found in Jetters, though their acquisition and usage is different than in Generation. Instead of Pokémon-style battles to acquire them, they are either hidden in certain levels or must be rescued from enemies. New to Jetters is a Charabom evolution system. By collecting food, Charaboms can evolve, changing their appearance and further improving their abilities. Some Charaboms are required to progress through a stage or collect hidden items.

In addition to White Bomber, Jetters also adds a second playable character, Max, whom players can switch to at any time during gameplay. While Max cannot use Charaboms like White Bomber, his Hyper Plasma Bomb can destroy certain walls and eliminate all on-screen enemies, making it helpful against some bosses. While Generation featured non-linear progression, allowing players to attempt stages in any order, Jetters features sequential stage progression.

=== Battle mode ===
Battle mode has also been improved from Generation. Instead of having only the four standard bombers, a variety of characters can be unlocked via Normal mode. The handicaps in the game are also different: instead of granting just hearts, the player can be given items on default. Each character also has a unique super move-type ability called the "Killer Shot" which allows them to gain the upper hand on opponents by attacking them or gaining special abilities during the match. Players can access their killer shot during battle after filling up a special meter by repeatedly placing bombs. An optional minigame, "Dig Em Bomber", can be played after each match; in the minigame, the match winner can dig for items, which they will immediately be granted in the next match, while others attempt to prevent them from doing so. Additional battle stages with unique gimmicks and hazards can also be unlocked.

In addition to the traditional Standard Battle mode, three other battle types are available as well. In "Battle One-Two", players must press the numbered switches in the order they flash to win the game, while stepping on a number already activated will take back the numbers the player currently is on. Only one player can do the process at a time, meaning the other players will have to neutralize them first before trying to press the switches. In "Battle for Balloms", players must collect balloon enemies and drop them in any of the four open holes. Players can blow an opponent's collection up, decreasing their chances of winning. As the player collects more balloon enemies, the increasing weight of the amount will slow them down. In "Knockout Battle", players have fully powered bombs, throws, punches, and kicks. The field has no destructible blocks and blasts can go through obstacles. The goal is to use bomb blasts to knock the other players off the arena.

=== Bomber Mansion ===
Players also have an arcade style mini-game in which they can access by dying at least once in normal mode. Similar to the arcade mode in Saturn Bomberman, the game lasts five stages and players can gain different ranks depending on how well they do.

== Reception ==
Reception

Aggregate score
Aggregator	Score
Metacritic	70/100

Review scores
Publication	Score
Edge	2/10
Famitsu	27/40
Game Informer	8/10
GameSpot	6/10
GameSpy	3/5
GameZone	8/10
IGN	6.7/10
Nintendo Power	3.5/5
X-Play	2/5

The GameCube version received "mixed or average reviews" according to the review aggregation website Metacritic. Game Informer gave it a favorable review, but Edge gave it a negative review, all while it was still in development. The game was criticized for its voice-acting, character's personalities being altered compared to the anime series version, and gameplay being unimproved from Bomberman Generation. Max's inclusion in the game was considered a wasted improvement and the charabom system was slightly criticized for being an imitation of Pokémon and for being required to get through some stages. However, as with its predecessor, it has won praise due to its multiplayer as many have stated it to "remain true to the formula". In Japan, Famitsu gave it a score of 27 out of 40. GamePro said that the game "may not have the multiplayer diversity of Mario Party, but for primitive addiction, it plays to form." (Note: GamePro gave the GameCube version 4/5 for graphics, 3.5/5 for sound, and two 4.5/5 scores for control and fun factor.)
