= Wonder World Amusement Park =

2008 video game

- North American Wii box art
- Developers: Majesco Studios Santa Monica (DS); Coyote Console; Kabloom Games (Wii)
- Publisher: Majesco
- Platforms: Wii, Nintendo DS
- Release: Wii: NA: July 8, 2008; EU: October 17, 2008; DS: NA: January 20, 2009; EU: May 29, 2009
- Genre: Party
- Modes: Single-player, multiplayer

Wonder World Amusement Park is a 2008 party video game developed by Majesco Studios Santa Monica (DS version) and British studio Coyote Console (Wii version) and published by Majesco for the Wii and Nintendo DS.

== Gameplay ==
Wonder World Amusement Park features a carnival setting and an array of mini-games based on carnival games. Some games include ring toss, basketball and knife throwing. Players for the DS use the stylus to push or throw the necessary items, the most common technique being a simple flick upwards.

== Reception ==
Reception

Aggregate score
Aggregator	Score
Metacritic	(DS) 60/100 (Wii) 37/100

Review scores
Publication	Score
1Up.com	D
GameSpot	4/10
GameZone	3.7/10
IGN	3.1/10
Jeuxvideo.com	6/20
NGamer	37%

The DS version received "mixed or average" reviews, while the Wii version received "generally unfavorable" reviews, according to the review aggregation website Metacritic.
