= Quad Desert Fury =

2003 racing video game

- Developer: Skyworks Technologies
- Publisher: Majesco Games
- Platform: Game Boy Advance
- Release: NA: 2003; EU: 2005
- Genre: Racing
- Mode: Single-player

Quad Desert Fury is a racing video game developed by Skyworks Technologies and published by Majesco Games for the Game Boy Advance in 2003.

== Gameplay ==
Quad Desert Fury is an off-road checkpoint racing game featuring two modes: Quick Race and Challenge.

In Quick Race, the player selects an available track in any order for a single race. In Challenge mode, players must compete on each track in a specific order. The objective is to win each race to progress to the next. If the player does not place first, they are given two more chances to compete on the same track. The game lacks a save feature, requiring players to complete the challenge in a single playthrough.

Races consist of three laps against three opponents across open terrain featuring obstacles such as sinkholes, large dunes, desert wells, bushes, cacti and landmines, which cost players precious time upon collision. While racing, players can find Gas Cans; colliding with these objects grants the ATV a brief burst of speed. The game features seven tracks set within the same environment, with checkpoints arranged in progressively more challenging and different layouts. Since the environment has no boundaries or limits, players can take multiple routes to reach the next checkpoint, guided by a green arrow indicator at the top of the screen.

== Development and release ==
The game was showcased at Majesco Games' booth during E3 2003. At the event, in an early hands-on preview, IGN praised the game's 3D voxel engine for creating realistic flowing terrain, but criticized the 2D character sprites for bouncing stiffly with low frames of animation. Similarly, the Polish magazine Neo Plus noted in its E3 coverage that while the announced voxel technology looked good, the quads and their drivers appeared visually poor. The game was released only in North America on September 30, 2003, as a budget title at a retail price of $19.99. In a May 2004 interview with Manci Games, Skyworks co-founder David Crane explained that the studio utilized their own proprietary 3D technology, which was specifically tailored to power an off-road driving game. On April 25, 2005, Majesco re-released the game, this time, also for the European market, on a single cartridge compilation alongside Monster Trucks, titled 2 Games In 1 Double Value: Monster Trucks & Quad Desert Fury. The bundle was released at the same price as the standalone release despite being a 2-in-1 bundle this time.

== Reception ==
Reception

Aggregate score
Aggregator	Score
GameRankings	37.17%

Review scores
Publication	Score
Nintendo Power	1.7/5
EAGB Advance	2/5
Portable Review	15/40
N-Zone	36%

Quad Desert Fury received generally negative reviews from critics upon release. Nintendo Power noted that the game featured a good graphics engine, but criticized the overly sensitive controls and a lack of vehicle customization options. EAGB Advance found the track graphics to be “nice” and appreciated the ability to go nearly everywhere in the game world, but criticized the severe frame rate drops when multiple opponents appeared on screen, as well as the loose handling and the absence of a save feature. Portable Review praised the game's impressive 3D engine, but criticized the repetitive look of the tracks and the awful controls. Regarding the European bundle release, Sascha Dowidat of the German magazine N-Zone criticized it as an insignificant budget racing bundle.

== Sales ==
In August 2004, nearly a year after its release, despite receiving negative reviews from critics, Quad Desert Fury entered Nintendo Power's monthly Game Boy Advance top ten sales chart at the number eight position. On this occasion, it outperformed Yu-Gi-Oh! World Championship Tournament 2004 and Mario & Luigi: Superstar Saga. The game demonstrated unusual commercial longevity on the platform. In the March 2007 issue of Nintendo Power, Quad Desert Fury ranked tenth in the top sellers list.

== Sequel ==
In July 2005, Nintendo Power reported that a sequel for the Nintendo DS, titled Quad Desert Fury 2, was in development in its "New Developments" section. The game remained listed under the section until the magazine's April 2007 issue. However, the project was ultimately never released and was cancelled without any official explanation.
