= Kristi Yamaguchi Fantasy Ice Skating =

1998 video game

- Developer: Morning Star Multimedia
- Publisher: WizardWorks
- Platform: Windows
- Release: March 1998
- Genre: Figure skating

Kristi Yamaguchi Fantasy Ice Skating is a 1998 video game developed by Morning Star Multimedia and published by WizardWorks. The game was released in March 1998. It is for girls ages 4 and up.

== Gameplay ==
Kristi Yamaguchi Fantasy Ice Skating allows the player to build a figure‑skating routine by selecting individual moves and arranging them into a sequence that Kristi Yamaguchi performs on screen. The user chooses a costume, a piece of music, and a setting such as an arena, an outdoor lake, or a fantasy backdrop. Video clips featuring Yamaguchi appear between activities to demonstrate movements and provide guidance. Completed routines can be saved, replayed, or altered later, and the motion‑capture model animates the skater's performance according to the player's selections.

== Development ==
The game was showcased at E3 1997.

== Reception ==
Los Angeles Times said "Younger eyes might not be as critical, so parents looking for a game free of violence or bad taste might want to take a look". Working Mother praised the game's motion-capture technology and the graphics.
