= NFL Blitz 2001 =

2000 video game

- Developers: Midway Games (Note: Ported to Dreamcast by Avalanche Software); Morning Star Multimedia (GBC)
- Publisher: Midway
- Series: NFL Blitz
- Platforms: Dreamcast, PlayStation, Nintendo 64, Game Boy Color
- Release: NA: September 12, 2000
- Genre: Sports
- Modes: Single-player, multiplayer

NFL Blitz 2001 is a video game developed and published by Midway for the Dreamcast, PlayStation, Nintendo 64 and Game Boy Color in 2000.

== Gameplay ==
NFL Blitz 2001 adds instant replay, five mini-games, and various other options.

== Reception ==
The Dreamcast version received "generally favorable reviews", while the Nintendo 64 and PlayStation versions received "average" reviews, according to the review aggregation website Metacritic. Greg Orlando of NextGen wrote of the former console version: "In Blitz's world all roughness is necessary – and quite fun, to boot." The Palm Beach Post staff writer David Thomas game the same console version a mixed review. He wrote that the game had "poor graphics for a Dreamcast game" and featured "awkward [...] controls", but he enjoyed the arcade mode. In a positive review, The Atlanta Journal-Constitution writer Michael Carvell called the game "cartoonish yet fun" and praised the graphics.

Human Tornado of GamePro said, "The latest Blitz for the Dreamcast is not a huge improvement over the last one, but there is enough here for true Blitz fans to pick up the sequel. For the rest of you who haven't experienced NFL Blitz yet, Blitz 2001 is a great football game that concentrates on action and fun." (Note: GamePro gave the Dreamcast version three 4.5/5 scores for graphics, control, and fun factor, and 4/5 for sound.) However, Vicious Sid said of the Nintendo 64 version, "Clearly, the Blitz series is in dire need of a top-to-bottom makeover. Though the rowdy pigskin-meets-WWF formula oozes potential, this year's edition barely limps onto the field. As it stands, Blitz 2001 is only a second-string effort; save your cash for Madden." (Note: GamePro gave the Nintendo 64 version three 3.5/5 scores for graphics, sound, and fun factor, and 4/5 for control.) The D-Pad Destroyer said that the PlayStation version "was a good idea when it started, but it has a lot of growing up to do to remain interesting. Hardnosed action football fans will lap this one up like a bowl of milk, but more hardcore armchair quarterbacks will want Madden or GameDay in their offensive line." (Note: GamePro gave the PlayStation version two 2.5/5 scores for graphics and control, 2/5 for sound, and 3/5 for fun factor.)

Reception

Aggregate scores
Aggregator	Score			
Aggregator	Dreamcast	GBC	N64	PS
GameRankings	81%	30%	72%	63%
Metacritic	78/100	N/A	72/100	70/100

Review scores
Publication	Score			
Publication	Dreamcast	GBC	N64	PS
AllGame	N/A	N/A	N/A	3/5
CNET Gamecenter	7/10	N/A	6/10	6/10
Electronic Gaming Monthly	7.33/10 (Note: Two critics of Electronic Gaming Monthly gave the Dreamcast version each a score of 7/10, and the other gave it 8/10.)	N/A	N/A	6.5/10
Game Informer	5.25/10	N/A	N/A	5.5/10
GameRevolution	C+	N/A	N/A	N/A
GameSpot	9/10	N/A	8.4/10	7.5/10
IGN	8/10	3/10	7.4/10	N/A
N64 Magazine	N/A	N/A	78%	N/A
Next Generation	4/5	N/A	N/A	N/A
Nintendo Power	N/A	N/A	7.8/10	N/A
Official U.S. PlayStation Magazine	N/A	N/A	N/A	3.5/5
