= ATV: Quad Frenzy =

2005 video game

- PAL cover art
- Developer: Skyworks Technologies
- Publisher: Majesco
- Composer: Gina Zdanowicz
- Platform: Nintendo DS
- Release: NA: November 14, 2005; EU: June 16, 2006; AU: October 25, 2007
- Genre: Racing
- Modes: Single-player, multiplayer

ATV: Quad Frenzy is a 2005 racing video game developed for the Nintendo DS by Skyworks Technologies and published by Majesco. It was released for the Nintendo DS handheld games console on November 14, 2005 in North America, on June 16, 2006 in Europe and on October 25, 2007 in Australia. ATV: Quad Frenzy features five different game modes, which all center around ATV (all-terrain vehicle) racing which takes place in various environments. Reviews of the game were critical; the game garnered only a 35% aggregated score from Metacritic.

== Gameplay ==
Screenshot of the video game

The ATV: Quad Frenzy game engine combines 3D graphics and a programming technique called a voxel. While at the time of the game's development the voxel was considered obsolete on the PC (its console of popularization), it was used in ATV: Quad Frenzy to create 3D graphics despite the DS's graphical limitations. Like most games on the DS, ATV: Quad Frenzy takes advantage of the console's dual screen nature: the top screen shows the player's quad bike (unobscured by any graphical overlays) while the bottom screen displays the heads-up display which provides the player with information such as the quad bike's current speed, the player's score and a lap counter.

Players can choose from six different ATV's which can be raced in five different game modes: Practice, Quick Race, Championship Race Circuit, Championship Style Circuit, and Head-to-Head. In Practice mode, players can race on any unlocked track so far, allowing them to practice their driving skills, while Quick Race provides the same only with computer-controlled opponents racing against the player. The Championship modes provide a career-progression gameplay style, allowing the player to obtain in-game currency (earned relating to race performance) which can be spent upgrading their ATV. In the Championship Style Circuit, stunts performed have an effect on race time, whilst in the Championship Race Circuit the player must come first or second to advance. Head-to-Head allows players to race against up to three other human players using the DS's wireless link, provided that all players own a copy of the game. All racing modes include a series of gates which must be passed through, and 25 different tracks are available to race on, offering a variety of terrains including "country backroads, swampy bogs, and slick, snowy tracks".

== Reception ==
Reception

Aggregate score
Aggregator	Score
Metacritic	35/100

Review scores
Publication	Score
GameSpot	3.6/10
IGN	4.8/10
VideoGamer.com	1/10

Reception for the game was poor. Though some praised the graphics and the in-game music, the game's user interface was widely criticized. GameSpot articulated its unhappiness with the sense of speed felt by players, calling it "practically nonexistent", and termed the trick system "clunky and incoherent". Its biggest criticism was reserved for the game's menu system, which it called "...one of the worst presentation setups we've seen in a long time. The main game menu is at once ugly and horrifically organized...". The review approved of the music, and some praise was afforded to the ATV graphical models.

The review from IGN echoed the praise of the game's graphics and, noting the good use of voxels, called the result "pretty darn nice". The IGN review panned the game's user interface, calling it a "chore to navigate and understand". The lack of a feeling of speed for players when racing was also noted. The reviewer concluded that despite reasonable gameplay and graphics, ATV: Quad Frenzy was "clearly shipped half-complete" due to its lackluster and cumbersome presentation.

VideoGamer took issue with the game's perceived extreme similarity to Monster Trucks DS, going so far as to call ATV: Quad Frenzy a "simple cut and paste job". The slow speed of the ATVs and concerns about the game's user interface were also raised, with the reviewer concluding that it was "quite disgraceful that they [ATV: Quad Frenzy and Monster Trucks DS] even made it onto store shelves."
