= Toy Shop =

2008 video game

- Developer: Seed Studios
- Publisher: Majesco Codemasters
- Producer: Filipe Pina
- Platform: Nintendo DS
- Release: NA: April 29, 2008; EU: October 2, 2008
- Genres: Simulation, role-playing video game
- Mode: Single-player

Toy Shop is a simulation/role-playing video game video game developed by Portuguese team Seed Studios and published by Majesco for the Nintendo DS handheld video game console. It is often compared to the Story of Seasons series but with a Toy Shop theme.

It was developed by the Portuguese video games company Seed Studios.
