= Nacho Libre (video game) =

2006 video game

- Developer: Budcat Creations
- Publisher: Majesco
- Designer: Nick Games
- Platform: Nintendo DS
- Release: NA: October 26, 2006; EU: June 29, 2007; AU: August 3, 2007
- Genre: Wrestling
- Modes: Single player, multiplayer

Nacho Libre is a video game for the Nintendo DS based upon the film of the same name. It was developed by Budcat Creations for Majesco and released in 2006 in the US, and 2007 in Europe and Australia.

== Gameplay ==
In Majesco's Nacho Libre game, players can play as one of 20 luchadors, including Nacho, each with their own unique abilities. The game also features a range of over-the-top wrestling attacks, six play modes, themed Touch Screen mini-games, 4 player wireless matches and numerous arenas from the movie in which players can battle to be the ultimate luchador.

== Reception ==
Reception

Aggregate scores
Aggregator	Score
GameRankings	54.67%
Metacritic	56/100

Review scores
Publication	Score
GameSpot	5.7/10
IGN	4/10
NGamer	46%
Nintendo Life	4/10
Nintendo Power	7/10

The game received "mixed" reviews according to video game review aggregator Metacritic.
