= Furu Furu Park =

2007 video game

- Developer: Taito
- Publishers: JP: Taito; NA: Majesco
- Platform: Wii
- Release: JP: April 19, 2007; NA: January 17, 2008
- Genre: Mini-games
- Modes: Single-player; Multiplayer

Furu Furu Park (ふるふるぱーく, Furu Furu Pāku) (originally known as Furi Furi) is a collection of minigames for the Wii. It was developed and published by Taito and was originally planned for a release in Japan for the Wii launch, but was pushed back to April 19, 2007. The minigames are inspired by classic Taito arcade games. Majesco published the title in the US on January 17, 2008. There are 2 single-player modes and 3 multi-player modes. It has 30 minigames to play.

== Minigames ==
The game features a variety of minigames. Some include skateboarding, safe cracker and puzzle. Most have references and/or shared gameplay elements with Taito classics.

== Reception ==
Reception

Aggregate score
Aggregator	Score
Metacritic	43/100

Review scores
Publication	Score
1Up.com	C
AllGame	2/5
Famitsu	23/40
GameRevolution	D
GameSpy	1.5/5
GamesRadar+	2/5
GameZone	4.5/10
IGN	3.5/10

The game received "generally unfavorable reviews" according to the review aggregation website Metacritic. In Japan, Famitsu gave it a score of 23 out of 40.
