= Toon-Doku =

2007 puzzle video game

- Developer: Dragon's Den Unlimited
- Publisher: Majesco
- Director: Joseph Sutton
- Producer: Robert Cooper
- Artists: Alison Rementer; Andrew Bado; Maciej Kuczynski
- Composers: Jason Robinson; Joseph H. Goldstein
- Platform: Nintendo DS
- Release: EU: April 10, 2007; NA: April 16, 2007; AU: October 12, 2007
- Genre: Puzzle
- Modes: Single-player, multiplayer

Toon-Doku is a 2007 sudoku puzzle video game developed by Dragon's Den Unlimited and published by Majesco for the Nintendo DS. Directed by Joseph Sutton, the game was first released in North America and Europe in April 2007, with an Australian release following in October later the same year.

Toon-Doku was received generally negatively by critics, who criticized the game for having poor controls, as well as its replacement of numbers with symbols.

== Gameplay ==
A typical puzzle within the game.

Toon-Doku follows the same principles as the logic-based puzzle Sudoku. In Toon-Doku, players have to fill a 9×9 grid with different symbols; however, no line or 3×3 subgrid can feature multiple of the same symbols. One of Toon-Doku's main gameplay points is the player's ability to draw custom symbols for use within the games puzzles. The game also has several unlockable symbols, which can be obtained by completing certain puzzles.

Toon-Doku features three main single-player modes: the instant mode, where players can play over 250 different sudoku puzzles, the stage mode, which features nine different levels, each with eleven puzzles, and the "Vs. CPU" mode, where the player competes against a CPU. Levels in the stage mode end with a boss fight, where an enemy can hide some of the boxes in the player's grid. Additionally, the game also features a multiplayer mode, where the player can hide some of the boxes in their enemies grids, similarly to the game's boss fights.

== Development and release ==
Toon-Doku was developed by the American video game development studio Dragon's Den Unlimited. The game was published by Majesco. The game was intended to be more suitable for younger players than traditional sudoku, which was attempted via the game primarily using symbols, instead of numbers.

The game was first announced on January 24, 2007, by its publisher, Majesco, with a scheduled release of April later that same year. Toon-Doku released on April 10, 2007, in Europe, with a North American release following on April 16. The game released in Australia on October 12.

== Reception ==
Reception

Aggregate score
Aggregator	Score
Metacritic	39/100 (Note: Based on 6 reviews.)

Review scores
Publication	Score
GamesRadar+	2.5/5
IGN	3.5/10
Jeuxvideo.com	9/20
NGamer	45/100
Nintendo World Report	2.5/10

Toon-Doku received "generally unfavorable reviews", according to review aggregator Metacritic. The aggregator calculated a normalized score of 39/100, based on six critic reviews.

The game has been criticized by multiple reviewers for primarily using symbols instead of numbers. JC Fletcher of Engadget wrote that the use of symbols makes it harder to solve puzzles, due to it being easier to know that a number is missing in a line, as opposed to a symbol, using a walrus as an example. Jeuxvideo.com's Jihem was more positive towards the use of symbols, while still writing that the idea wasn't original, due to it being used in children's newspaper, as well as another sudoku Nintendo DS game, Zendoku.

Several critics have voiced a disliking towards the game's controls. Eric Bratcher of GamesRadar described the controls and interface as "clunky", in addition to criticizing how it's hard to tell which symbol is which, due to the Nintendo DS' "fuzzy screen". Jihem disliked the game's use of the Nintendo DS stylus, as he felt it was inprecise.

Critics have enjoyed the amount of content included in the game. Jonathan Metts of Nintendo World Report rated the game's lastability 8.5/10, writing that the game's randomly generated puzzles leads to "infinite possibilities". Bratcher listed unlocking symbols and the game's length as two of its best points. Jihem mirrored Bratcher's sentiments, writing that unlocking images in the game feels more complete than other aspects of the game.
