= Blast Works =

2008 video game

Blast Works: Build, Trade, Destroy
- North American box art
- Developer: Budcat Creations
- Publisher: Majesco
- Platform: Wii
- Release: NA: June 10, 2008; EU: April 3, 2009; AU: April 30, 2009
- Genre: Scrolling shooter
- Modes: Single-player, multiplayer

Blast Works: Build, Trade, Destroy is a horizontally scrolling shooter for the Wii based on the Microsoft Windows game Tumiki Fighters created by Kenta Cho. Majesco published the game on June 10, 2008 in North America. It was released in Europe as Blast Works: Build, Fuse & Destroy on April 3, 2009.

== Gameplay ==
The player controls an aircraft on a two-dimensional plane. As the player destroys enemies, their debris fall off the screen below. If the player manages to touch these pieces of debris with their ship before they disappear from the screen, these pieces affix themselves to the player's plane in the positions they were caught, providing extra mass and firepower.

The extra parts, which reanimate and continue to fire their own unique weapons, can serve as shields against enemy projectiles (each part breaks into pieces and falls off upon hit), and all of the augmentations can be retracted into the original ship.

There are a wide variety of different enemies, which provide varying patterns of fire and numbers of points.

=== Editor ===
Blast Works comes with an editing tool to customize the game. Players can construct their own ships, enemies and bosses with the editor, as well as create their own backgrounds.

When designing enemies, the player can manipulate projectile patterns, sound effects, movement patterns, hit boxes, and more in the Ship Editor portion of the Blast Works Editor. The player also has the option of fully customizing the ship that they play as. For example, the ship builder lets the player view their ship from many different angles, allowing them to add new pieces, such as wings or weapons, simply by adding shapes to their ship. The basic shapes can be combined to create even more complex constructs, and there are a few moving shapes the player can add to give their ship a bit more life. The player is also given full control over the size, shape, and color of any object they create. This ranges from their main ship to buildings created for custom levels and even enemy craft.

The level designer (the same tool the game's developers used to create the built-in levels that come with the game) also features powerful capabilities. The player can set the basics, such as color scheme or background, then drag and drop enemies into their custom level from either a list of pre-built enemies or custom ships previously created. The player can also set trigger events that can change the orientation of your ship, the behavior of enemy ships, or the movement of the game camera. The player can also add a number of different special effects to their level such as a Virtual Boy-like effect, which turns everything in the level to red and black, or a water effect, to make background oceans or the level itself appear underwater. After constructing a level, the player can preview it before importing it into the game.

== Development ==
TUMIKI Fighters was first released in 2004. It is written in the D programming language, with graphics drawn with OpenGL. Unlike the rest of Kenta Cho's shooters, TUMIKI Fighters has specific levels, non-random enemy placement, and a definite ending. The game was released as free software.

The game's name is derived from the Japanese word tsumiki (積み木), meaning "building blocks"; this word may also be romanized as tumiki.

== Reception ==
Reception

Aggregate score
Aggregator	Score
Metacritic	78/100

Review scores
Publication	Score
Destructoid	9/10
Edge	6/10
Eurogamer	8/10
Game Informer	8/10
GameSpot	8/10
GameSpy	4/5
GameTrailers	8.4/10
GameZone	9/10
IGN	8.1/10
Nintendo Power	8.5/10
Teletext GameCentral	7/10

Blast Works received "generally favorable reviews" according to the review aggregation website Metacritic.

It received multiple nominations from IGN in its 2008 video game awards, including Best Shooting Game and Most Innovative Design.
