= Casper (video game) =

Series of video games based on the 1995 film Casper

- North American box art for the SNES version
- Genre: Action-adventure
- Developers: Funcom (SS) (PS); Logicware (3DO); Bonsai Entertainment (GB); Imagineering (SNES); G3 Interactive (GBC); Planet Interactive (GBA); Morning Star Multimedia (PC)
- Publishers: Interplay Productions; Natsume Inc. (GB & SNES); Microïds (GBA); WizardWorks (PC)
- Composers: Kinuyo Yamashita (SFC); Allister Brimble (GBC)
- Platforms: PlayStation, Sega Saturn, 3DO, Game Boy, SNES, Game Boy Color, Game Boy Advance, Windows 95, Windows 98
- Original release: 1996, 1997, 2002
- First release: Casper Brainy Book; May 1996
- Latest release: Casper; 2002
- Parent series: Casper

Casper is a series of action-adventure games based on the 1995 film of the same name. Two different games were released in 1996 and 1997 for the Super Nintendo Entertainment System, by different publishers, in different regions. A third game was released for the 3DO (the final release for that system), Sega Saturn, PlayStation, and Game Boy Color, published by Interplay Productions. There was also a Game Boy game developed by Bonsai. A PC game, Casper: The Interactive Adventure, and a Game Boy Advance game, simply titled Casper, were released in 1997 and 2002 respectively serving as sequels.

== Windows/Macintosh game ==
The first PC game based on the film was the Casper Brainy Book which was developed by Knowledge Adventure and was released in May 1996. It was aimed at children aged 4–8 and is an interactive storybook, similar in style to Disney's Animated Storybooks, in which players read and play in the story and there are three mini-games, Fatso's Creature Feature, Stretch's Shake Rattle and Roll and Stinkie's Peek-a-boo, designed to teach vocabulary, spelling and shape recognition. Being aimed at younger children, some of the darker elements of the story are cut with Carrigan, Dibs and Amelia absent, Dr. Harvey's career is to hunt for ghosts and the Lazarus being named simply as the "Machine" and was described as turning a ghost into a person. The Cellular Integrator also only appears in one of the mini-games. Although Carrigan and Dibs are cut from the story they appear in the hard jigsaw puzzles, among stills from the film, in Fatso's Creature Feature. Casper and the Ghostly Trio were reprised by their respective voice actors from the film, while Kat and Dr. Harvey were voiced by Jamie Cronin and Dan Woren, replacing Christina Ricci and Bill Pullman respectively. Narration was provided either by Joe Nipote or Hettie Lynn Hurtes, depending on if the player clicked on Dr. Harvey or Kat on the front page.

=== Mini-games ===
- Fatso's Creature Feature is a simple puzzle game with players completing puzzles that result in brief animations once finished. "Easy" has the player assembling Casper and his uncles, while "medium" has the player assembling puzzles featuring the Ghostly Trio in different shapes, colors and patterns. As explained upwards, the hard difficulty puzzles consist of stills from the film which when completed, play a scene relating to that image.
- Stretch's Shake Rattle and Roll is a spelling game in which players have to free Casper from the kitchen stove chimney (Stretch had trapped him down it) by spelling words in a Tetris-like fashion. Players have to use the arrow keys to put each letter into the correct boxes and each time a word is completed, Stretch moves Casper up a level until he reaches the top. On higher difficulties, the letters will fall faster and even appear in different orientations, so players must also use the up and down arrows to turn the letters. If no letters match any in the current word, they can be given to Fatso, though he will also eat any letters that are incorrectly matched or are in the wrong orientation even if they are matched.
- Stinky's Peek-A-Boo has the player help the ghost version of Dr. Harvey (who is trapped in the Lazarus) catch Stinky, who has stolen the Cellular Integrator for the Lazarus in an attempt to keep Harvey as a ghost. Stinky will turn himself into random shapes and players have to click on different tiles on a board to find words or objects (based on the current difficulty) that match the current shape he has become or something within the shape itself (i.e. an action or a day of the week). The higher the difficulty, the more words/objects the player has to match to catch Stinky.

== Super Nintendo Entertainment System game ==
Casper is a game developed by Absolute Entertainment and published by Natsume Inc. for the Super NES. The player controls Casper who is followed by Kat Harvey, and he has to protect her from any danger. Being a ghost, Casper can pass through walls and other obstacles, unlike in most Casper games, but he can't go away from Kat too much or else Carrigan's ghost will abduct her. The game follows loosely the plot of the film. This game uses a revised Absolute A Boy and His Blob engine. Picking up special objects allows Casper to morph into these objects to clear rooms of enemies, and to protect Kat from certain hazards. Mirrors placed throughout the game allows Casper and Kat travel to other parts of mansion, and outside electrical lines allow Casper to pick up the last of the toys when he picks up the electric bolt morph.

== Super Famicom game ==
Developed by Natsume Co., Ltd., this was released only in Japan by the anime company KSS. In this version, the game uses an isometric view and the player mostly controls Kat Harvey as she protects Casper from the duo of Carrigan Crittenden and Dibs though Casper can be controlled occasionally after finding special pick-ups. During the course of the game, Kat collects items, therefore making this game an adventure game as opposed to an action game.

Baseballs are used to stun the enemies. Getting hit by an enemy results in a game over. There is even a box to the bottom right that keeps track of time (in seconds and minutes); the game starts with ten seconds elapsed. Saving the game is performed by finding mechanical contraptions and activating them. While saving the game, the game counts all the coins and gems; it uses that count to tabulate a percentage to decide how much of the game has been officially completed.

== Sega Saturn, 3DO, PlayStation, and Game Boy Color game ==
The version published by Interplay and developed by Funcom plays as a top-view action-adventure game with pre-rendered graphics. The game features an alternate rendition of the film's plot (with some of its dark elements retained) spread across three acts, consisting of Casper finding tokens of friendship for Kat and Dr. Harvey, then finding the pieces for the Lazarus machine (which the Ghostly Trio had disassembled to prevent Casper from using it) and assembling it, and finally finding the Cellular Integrator with which to restore Harvey (which is stolen by Carrigan, leading to the final challenge), while exploring the mansion, collecting jigsaw pieces to solve puzzles for morph icons, eating food for morph points and dealing with the Ghostly Trio. Unlike other versions, other than the Ghostly Trio and Carrigan, there are no enemies. The game instead focuses mainly on solving puzzles. Like in the Brainy Book, Casper and his uncles were reprised by their respective voice actors, whilst Kat and Dr. Harvey were voiced by Tanya Krievins and Blair Bess (again replacing Ricci and Pullman), with Bess providing narration for each act's introduction as well as reading out several hint parchments found throughout the game. Carrigan's voice actor remains uncredited (due to her appearing at the end and her only line being "I'll take that!").

In an odd seeming oversight, in the game, no matter what one does, the player seems to wind up with an extra red key. Players have scoured the manor with no luck finding an extra red door. After combing through the games information, it seems there truly is no extra red door or room in which to use it. It is possible and likely that the extra red key was an oversight in the fact that it may have supposed to have been a gold key. If the player uses one of the gold keys in the wrong intended order, it softlocks the player out of the latter half of the game's secrets. It is also possible, but less likely, that it is merely a red herring.

The Game Boy Color game is a scaled-down version of the Saturn/3DO/PS game with the only puzzles and morph icons being the ones required to reach the ending and the sound and graphics are rendered for handheld.

The game's written dialogue notably features usage of the typeface used for The Nightmare Before Christmas.

=== Development ===
Silicon Graphics workstations using Alias software were used to generate the character graphics and backgrounds in the Saturn/PlayStation/3DO game.

== Game Boy game ==
This game was developed by Bonsai Entertainment and released by Natsume Inc.

Each of the levels consist of four main mini games, which the player can do in any order, and two final mini games that only appear at the end of the game. However, three of the main mini games are the same every level, with their only difference being a slightly increased difficulty level. The main goal of these games are to make it to the end with as much ooze as possible (ooze being fuel for the Lazarus and is much like points).

== Windows 95/98 game ==
Casper: The Interactive Adventure is a point and click adventure CD-ROM game made by WizardWorks and Morning Star Multimedia in 1997 and takes place after the 1995 film. After the Harveys go on vacation, Casper's human friends throw him a party to cheer him up but a revived Carrigan turns them into ghosts, using a magic spell from an old book in the library, and hides them somewhere in the manor as revenge for being tricked out of the ultimate treasure. The player must use various items to travel around Whipstaff to find traces of Casper's friends and take pictures of them for hints and collect items while defending against attacks by the Ghostly Trio who are on Carrigan's side. There was supposed to be a sequel as stated in the ending and the manual where the player would help Casper turn his friends back into "fleshies" but Morning Star went bankrupt before it was made.

== Game Boy Advance game ==
Made by Microïds and Planet Interactive in 2002, it is one of few video games in which Casper can actually go through walls though only through the ones within each level. The Ghostly Trio have turned all the adults in town (presumably Friendship, Maine) into zombies leaving the children scared at the mercy of the Trio. The old Schoolmistress of the manor has them call in Dr. James Harvey to stop them only to become a zombie himself capable only of walking in front of him. It's up to Casper to help safely guide him through each of five levels using various transformations and objects to help the zombie Doctor collect flasks with the formula to cure him. There also six children in each level to rescue though the player does not need to in order to finish a level, but Casper needs to save every child to become Hero of the Day. The Ghostly Trio show up in each level occasionally to scare Dr. Harvey and throw him off course and Casper must deflect their attacks.

== Reception ==
Reception

Aggregate score
Aggregator	Score
GameRankings	49% (PS1)

Review scores
Publication	Score
AllGame	3/5 (GBC); 2/5 (PS1); 2/5 (SAT)
Electronic Gaming Monthly	6.75/10 (3DO)
Next Generation	3/5 (3DO, PS1, SAT)
Sega Saturn Magazine	70% (SAT)

Reviewing the 3DO version, Electronic Gaming Monthly's team of four reviewers criticized that load times are frequent, it is easy to get lost, and that the puzzles are often obscure or even don't make sense. They nonetheless had a generally positive response to the game, with Sushi-X deeming it a strong last hurrah for the 3DO. They cited the stunning graphics and wide variety of gameplay elements. A critic for Next Generation agreed that the graphics are exceptional, noting in particular the ghosts which have true transparency (an effect generally thought to be impossible for the 3DO). While also agreeing that some of the puzzles don't make sense, he felt the game was generally easy enough for its young target audience, and concluded it to be a solid though not amazing game. The magazine's brief reviews of the PlayStation and Saturn versions made similar comments.

Sega Saturn Magazine gave the Saturn version a 70%, calling it "a decent effort" when adapting the film into game, but noted some occasional flaws in gameplay and called it "repetitive". Their next issue printed a retraction, admitting that Interplay had not sent them a review copy of Casper, and that the review was actually based on an unfinished version of the game.
