= Flip's Twisted World =

2010 video game

- North American box art
- Developer: Frozen North Productions
- Publisher: Majesco
- Designer: Douglas Gregory
- Composer: Tommy Tallarico
- Platform: Wii
- Release: NA: October 25, 2010
- Genre: Platform
- Mode: Single-player

Flip's Twisted World is a platform game published by Majesco and developed by Frozen North Productions for the Wii. The game was released on October 25, 2010 in North America.

== Gameplay ==
Flip's Twisted World is a 3D puzzle platforming game in which the player is able to use the Wii Remote to rotate the angle of the world, creating new pathways, turning ceilings and walls into floors, and allowing the player to creatively move around on all available surfaces.

== Plot ==
The story of the game follows the tale of a wizard's apprentice named Flip, who gets sucked into a distorted universe inside of a forbidden magic book. Flip, with the assistance of his cube companion Pivot, has to make his way through multiple worlds inside this universe and defeat a boss in each world to gain a Chapter Stone. Using the power of the Chapter Stones, Flip must defeat the evil, destructive mage Axel to save the universe and return home.

== Development ==
Flip's Twisted World has been in development by Canadian developer Frozen North Productions since their inception in 2006.

Anthony Head was the lead voice actor for Master Fulcrum and the game also featured Toronto actress Emily Schooley as the voice of Flip.

In September 2010, they previewed the game for local children at nearby St. Cyril's Elementary School.

The game was originally scheduled for release in January 2010.

== Reception ==
Reception

Aggregate scores
Aggregator	Score
GameRankings	48.44%
Metacritic	47

Review scores
Publication	Score
Game Informer	3.50 / 10
IGN	4.0 / 10
Nintendo Power	6.0 / 10
Nintendo World Report	5.0 / 10

Flip's Twisted World received generally negative reviews, gaining aggregate scores of 48.44% and 47 on GameRankings and Metacritic, respectively.

In previews, the game's control scheme was lauded by Joystiq as enticing, and they and several other reviewers compared the controls to Nintendo's Super Mario Galaxy. However, the article also said that the platforming does not show much promise and controls are lacking, and that the game felt very linear and lacks content. In the end, they referred to the game as a "poor man's Super Mario Galaxy". An article at IGN noted that the rotating mechanics need more work, but admitted that the controls could become natural if fixed.

Following its release, the game received a final score of 6.0/10 from Nintendo Power magazine, citing a "lack of polish and poor enemy design".

== Frozen North Productions ==
Frozen North Productions is a Canadian video game developer founded in 2006. The studio is based out of Toronto, Ontario, Canada, though it began in Waterloo, Ontario in the University of Waterloo Accelerator Centre.

The company is now closed down.
