= Raze's Hell =

2005 video game

- Developer: Artech Studios
- Publisher: Majesco
- Directors: Rick Banks; Paul Butler; Richard Cooper
- Producer: Howard Perlman
- Designers: Rick Banks; Josh Bridge; Tim Sandwell
- Programmers: Tim Sandwell; David Eccleston; Andrew Creskey; Richard Lalancette
- Artists: Kristofer Eggleston; Cory Humes; Chris Hale
- Composer: Mike Keogh
- Platform: Xbox
- Release: NA: April 21, 2005; EU: February 17, 2006
- Genre: Third-person shooter
- Modes: Single-player, multiplayer

Raze's Hell is an action game developed by Artech Studios, and published by Majesco for the Xbox console in 2005. It was made available on the Xbox Live Marketplace in 2008.

== Gameplay ==
The player character, Raze, has attacks consisting of using his wrist blade and rolling. When an enemy Kewlett is killed, it splatters on the screen or bursts into bloody chunks. Raze can suck up the Kewlett chunks to restore his health and can use stealth mode. Raze also sucks up insects called Squibs, which serve as ammunition.

The Kewletts want to exterminate the Squibs. Different types of Squibs have varying effects, such as: Raze can breathe fire by sucking in flames, much as he does to the Squibs. Red crystals are scattered about the levels that explode when attacked.

Four mini-games can be unlocked in Raze's Hell:

- Survival – Survive waves of Kewletts and get a high score.
- Silent but Deadly - Use stealth mode to sneak around Kewlett fortresses.
- Cojones Golf & Country Golf – Knock around a large white ball in an 18-hole golf course or play a game of mini-golf.
- Blood Rain – Protect a Shnow from hordes of parachuting Kewlett troops.

A two-player mode allows two players to cooperate to kill the Kewletts, as well as an online mode that features a variety of mini-games. multiplayer on Xbox Live was available to players until 15 April 2010. Raze's Hell is now playable online again on the replacement Xbox Live servers called Insignia.

The multi-player games consist of:

- Deathmatch – Kill everyone.
- Team Deathmatch – Kill everyone with teams.
- King of the Hill – Control a hill for as long as possible.
- Team King of the Hill – Control a hill with teams.
- Capture the Flag – Capture the other team's flag and return it to your base.
- Soccer – A more violent soccer that uses a Kewlett-skin ball.

== Plot ==
For centuries, the Kewletts, a cute and happy race, lived an idyllic existence inside the hallowed walls of Kewtopia. They never went outside the gates of their city because they had everything they needed inside: a wonderful princess, perfect weather, wealth, and privilege. The Kewletts parody different types of cute creatures found in media. Before the events in the game, the Kewletts lived isolated from the rest of their world. Their first attempt at diplomacy with the creatures of the hinterlands was brief and failed.

Afterwards, their Princess decided to launch "Operation Fresh Hope" to "cutetify" all of the "monsters" outside of Kewtopia. The true nature behind "Operation Fresh Hope", unknown to most Kewletts, is the retrieval of three ancient artifacts that the Princess desires due to her being a Huggly. Because the Kewletts are intensely nationalistic – a worldview constantly reinforced through propaganda broadcasts on the "QTV" news network, segments of which are seen between the game's levels – they support the idea of expanding the Kewlett empire throughout the war and the "cleansing" of the hinterlands of monsters. Their belligerent, racist worldview is in sharp contrast to their cute, gentle appearance, and serves as a satire of imperialism and colonialism, with the Kewletts utterly convinced of their moral superiority.

The Kewletts' increasingly vicious colonization efforts carry on until they meet Raze, an ugly, simple beast who is transformed when he accidentally stumbles upon ancient artifacts. Raze's heroics spark a swelling underground guerrilla movement.

== Development ==
Producer Rick Banks said the idea for the game came after focus groups had a positive reception to hidden features Artech added to children interactive products, "such as setting cute characters on fire", and made the developers decide to make a game where one would "kill and maim the commercially created cute", with the starting point being that those creatures would be cold-blooded killers. The game spent over three years in development, starting as a test bed for an in-house engine, picked up by a publisher that wound up encountered financial difficulties, and after months stalled being ultimately picked up by Majesco. Audio designer Mike Keogh had his first opportunity to do sound and music for a video game, which featured vocals by his future wife, and over 6,000 lines of Kewlett dialogue, mostly performed by Keogh himself, who also wrote them with the help of his high school improv friends.

== Reception ==
Reception

Aggregate score
Aggregator	Score
Metacritic	71/100

Review scores
Publication	Score
Eurogamer	6/10
Game Informer	6/10
GameSpot	7.5/10
GameSpy	3.5/5
GameTrailers	8/10
GameZone	7.5/10
IGN	7/10
Official Xbox Magazine (US)	5.7/10
VideoGamer.com	6/10
X-Play	3/5
Detroit Free Press	2/4

Raze's Hell received "average" reviews according to the review aggregation website Metacritic.
