= Turn and Burn: No-Fly Zone =

1994 video game

- Cover art (Super NES)
- Developer: Imagineering
- Publishers: NA: Absolute Entertainment; JP: Pack-In-Video; EU: Sony Imagesoft
- Platform: Super NES
- Release: NA: February 1994; JP: June 24, 1994; EU: August 8, 1994
- Genre: Combat flight simulation
- Mode: Single-player

Turn and Burn: No-Fly Zone is a combat flight simulator from Absolute Entertainment for the Super NES, released in 1994. It is the sequel to Turn and Burn: The F-14 Dogfight Simulator, a Game Boy game which also featured the F-14 Tomcat aircraft. An enhanced port of this game was released as F-14 Tomcat on Game Boy Advance. A Sega Mega Drive version was planned but never released.

== Gameplay ==
Once an enemy plane has been spotted, players can either shoot it down with a missile or with their guns.

This game is played in first-person perspective, inside the cockpit. The player has on the beginning of every mission to launch from an aircraft carrier and has to land on it on the end of every mission as well.

While on air, the player will receive their objective, which consists of taking down enemy jets and/or enemy bases on small islands. The player has three types of missiles and a cannon to destroy the enemy jets. Each missile differs on range, accuracy and speed. To destroy the enemy bases, the player can only use the cannon.

On later missions with an increasing number of targets, the player's limited fuel and ammunition supplies becomes a factor. It is possible to refuel the jet while on air, attaching to a bigger aircraft sent by the aircraft carrier, but to reload the missiles players must land on the aircraft carrier.

By pressing and holding the "Y" button on the controller before the player takes off, they can access a fully configurable Tomcat's system menu. The player will also be able to change missiles, HUD options along with other changeable features of the aircraft.

== See also ==
- F-14 Tomcat
- Super Strike Eagle
