= Bust-a-Move DS =

2005 video game

- North American box art
- Developer: Happy Happening
- Publishers: JP: Taito; NA: Majesco; EU: 505 GameStreet
- Platform: Nintendo DS
- Release: NA: December 6, 2005; JP: February 2, 2006; PAL: February 3, 2006
- Genre: Puzzle
- Modes: Single-player, multiplayer

Bust-a-Move DS, known as Hippatte!! Puzzle Bobble (Japanese: ひっぱって!!パズルボブル, Hepburn: Hippatte!! Pazuru Boburu; "Pull Back!! Puzzle Bobble") in Japan, is a puzzle video game developed by Happy Happening and published by Majesco for the Nintendo DS handheld video game console.

The game received mixed reaction due to the game lacking new features apart from the new slingshot system.

== Gameplay ==
Instead of the usual firing mechanism used in previous games in the series, a slingshot system is used to fire bubbles, controlled by the stylus and the touch screen. There are 500 levels in all, divided evenly across two campaigns and grouped into 50 sets of 10 levels; players must finish a set's 10 levels in one sitting to progress.

== Release ==
It was featured in publisher Majesco's Electronic Entertainment Expo presentation in 2005.

== Reception ==
Reception

Aggregate score
Aggregator	Score
Metacritic	75/100

Review scores
Publication	Score
4Players	76%
Eurogamer	6/10
Famitsu	27/40
GameSpot	7.4/10
IGN	7.5/10
Jeuxvideo.com	14/20
Nintendo Power	7.5/10
Pocket Gamer	3/5
VideoGamer.com	7/10
X-Play	4/5

In her preview, Carrie Gouskos of GameSpot noted that the touchscreen controls took some getting used to and lacked precision. Marc Nix of IGN felt that the touchscreen controls were cool, feeling that the multiplayer component would make it a worthwhile purchase when released.

Bust-a-Move DS received "generally favorable reviews" according to the review aggregation website Metacritic. In Japan, Famitsu gave it a score of three sevens and one six for a total of 27 out of 40.

Mathew Kumar of Eurogamer felt that the touchscreen slingshot controls were interesting and mechanically satisfying, but found them useless on later levels due to how much longer it takes to use them, making it more difficult to beat these levels. He found the use of the two screens to be good, and praised the multiplayer experience, though noting that the lack of online makes it harder to enjoy it. Meanwhile, Ryan Davis of GameSpot found the touchscreen support to be solid, praising the multiplayer and number of levels to play, while expressing disappointment over its "weak AI" and difficulty aiming with the Nintendo DS' directional pad. Tom Orry of VideoGamer.com called its gameplay "fiendishly addictive," though he lamented that the gameplay was "more of the same." He also noted that the touchscreen option allows for more precision than the directional pad controls. Craig Harris of IGN similarly found the touchscreen controls valuable to a "classic" game, though he wished there were more new things added to the game. Jon Jordan of Pocket Gamer praised it as simple but with "strategic depth," though he felt the lack of extra modes held it back. The X-Play review also wished there was more new to it, though it noted that it was "still one of the best on-the-go puzzle games" and that the game made good use of both the touchscreen and the dual screens.
