= Top Gun: Guts and Glory =

1993 video game

- North American cover art
- Developer: Distinctive Software
- Publisher: Konami
- Producer: David E. Davis
- Designers: David E. Davis; Chris Lippmann; Dave Warfield; Don A. Mattrick
- Programmers: Chris Lippmann; Douglas E. Smith
- Artist: Jackie Marie Ritchie
- Composer: Traz Damji
- Series: Top Gun
- Platform: Game Boy
- Release: NA: January 1993; EU: 1993
- Genre: Modern jet flight simulation
- Mode: Single-player

Top Gun: Guts and Glory is a modern jet flight simulation that was released in 1993 for the original Nintendo Game Boy in Europe and North America.

== Gameplay ==
Preparing to fire a missile at the enemy aircraft

This video game is loosely based on the Top Gun film starring Tom Cruise. Essentially controlling a modern U.S. Air Force jet through ten levels, players must take out enemy jet fighters in addition to battleships.

Aircraft that can be chosen are the F-14 Tomcat, the F-117A Nighthawk stealth fighter, the F-16 Fighting Falcon and the Soviet-made MiG-29 Fulcrum. Players can either dedicate themselves to a long career mode, engage in a quick air combat session, or go on a bombing run. Passwords help store the player's progress in career mode.

Due to various limitations found on the original Game Boy system, the player can only see and fight against two enemy aircraft at a time.

== Reception ==
Power Unlimited gave this video game a 40%, they criticized the game commenting: "Sad graphics, little action, poor controllability, and much more. It's all deeply sad." Joypad gave it a rating of 25% overall. Aggregator GameRankings gave the game 51.50%.

== See also ==
- Top Gun (video game)
- Turn and Burn: The F-14 Dogfight Simulator
