= F24: Stealth Fighter =

2006 video game

F-24: Stealth Fighter
- Publisher: Majesco
- Platforms: Game Boy Advance, Nintendo DS
- Release: GBA 6 November 2006; DS 1 February 2007
- Genre: Combat flight simulation

F-24: Stealth Fighter is a video game developed by Skyworks Technologies and published by Majesco in 2006 for the Game Boy Advance and 2007 for the Nintendo DS. Upon release, the game received negative reviews, with criticism directed at the game's visual presentation, poor controls, and resemblance to other flight simulation games.

== Gameplay ==
Game Boy Advance gameplay screenshot

Players control a United States fighter jet named an F-24, and are tasked by the President to stop the sale of nuclear weapons in Iran. The objective of the game is to control the jet in first-person view using controls from the cockpit, and deploy weapons to defeat enemy jets or bases across a series of missions. Players use the D-pad to maneuver the jet, and combine the B button with other buttons to adjust speed and change weapons. The L and R buttons are used to charge weapons or look forward or behind the craft. The game features a campaign mode with 20 missions, in which players must take off from an aircraft carrier, complete a series of mission objectives, and return to the carrier. The DS and Game Boy Advance versions are broadly identical, although the DS makes use of its dual-screen display with players able to control the plane using a control stick on the lower touchscreen. The DS version also features multiplayer play for up to four players to compete in deathmatch-style dogfights.

== Reception ==
Reception

Aggregate score
Aggregator	Score	
Aggregator	DS	GBA
Metacritic	34%	

Review scores
Publication	Score	
Publication	DS	GBA
AllGame	1.5/5	1.5/5
GameSpot	3.7/10	
IGN	3.5/10	
Nintendo Power	3.5/10	

Several critics found F-24 to be derivative of other titles in the combat flight simulation genre. IGN felt the game's interface was "lousy" due to its small text, its controls not intuitive, and the game overall "plain, boring, unstrategic and confusing". Similarly, GameSpot described F-24 to have "touchy controls and disorienting visuals", feeling the game lacked variety in mission goals and enemies. Despite finding the DS version of the game made use of its dual screens, Nintendo Power critiqued the graphics as "pain and boring" and the controls "nearly impossible to fly".
