= Turn and Burn: The F-14 Dogfight Simulator =

1992 video game

- North American cover art
- Developer: Imagineering Inc.
- Publishers: NA: Absolute Entertainment; EU: Activision
- Designers: Dan Kitchen; Roger W. Amidon
- Composer: Stuart Ross
- Platform: Game Boy
- Release: 1992
- Genre: Flight simulation
- Mode: Single-player

Turn and Burn: The F-14 Dogfight Simulator is a flight simulation video game developed by Imagineering Inc. and released in 1992 for the Game Boy in Europe and North America. In Europe, the game was released as the Game Boy adaptation of Phantom Air Mission, the European version of Imagineering's previous flight simulator Flight of the Intruder. A sequel, Turn and Burn: No-Fly Zone, was later released for the Super NES.

== See also ==
- Top Gun: Guts and Glory
