= Black & Bruised =

2003 video game

- PAL region cover art for PlayStation 2
- Developer: Digital Fiction
- Publishers: NA: Majesco; PAL: Vivendi Universal Games
- Designer: Martin Lizee
- Programmers: Philippe Gagnon; Darren Pegg
- Writers: Sara Brown; Laurent Castellucci; Cliff Daigle; Allan Legros; Betsy Lipes; Brent Radford
- Composer: Stephen Angelini
- Platforms: GameCube; PlayStation 2
- Release: NA: January 28, 2003; PAL: June 27, 2003
- Genres: Fighting, sports
- Modes: Single-player, multiplayer

Black & Bruised is a boxing-based fighting video game developed by Digital Fiction and published by Majesco in 2003 in North America; in the PAL regions such as Europe and Australia it was published by Vivendi Universal Games.

== Gameplay ==
Black & Bruised has three modes: 1P Fight, where player fights against a CPU; 2P Fight, where two players fight against each other; and Survival, where the players fight for as long as they can.

In order to complete the game, the player must play through the "life" of each fighter, which consists of multiple fights interspersed with cutscenes. Additionally, there is a tournament mode with varying difficulties. Completion of the tournaments is required to unlock the hidden fighters, who each come with their own "life" to play through.

== Reception ==
Reception

Aggregate score
Aggregator	Score	
Aggregator	GameCube	PS2
Metacritic	66 / 100	63 / 100

Review scores
Publication	Score	
Publication	GameCube	PS2
AllGame	2.5/5	N/A
Electronic Gaming Monthly	N/A	5.5 / 10
Game Informer	7.5 / 10	7.5 / 10
GamePro	4/5	4/5
GameSpot	6.7 / 10	6.7 / 10
GameSpy	2/5	2/5
GameZone	6.9 / 10	6.5 / 10
IGN	6.1 / 10	6.3 / 10
Nintendo Power	3.7 / 5	N/A
Official U.S. PlayStation Magazine	N/A	4/5

The game received "mixed or average reviews" on both platforms according to video game review aggregator Metacritic.

== See also ==
- List of fighting games
