= Rumble Pak =

Group of accessories for the Nintendo 64 and DS

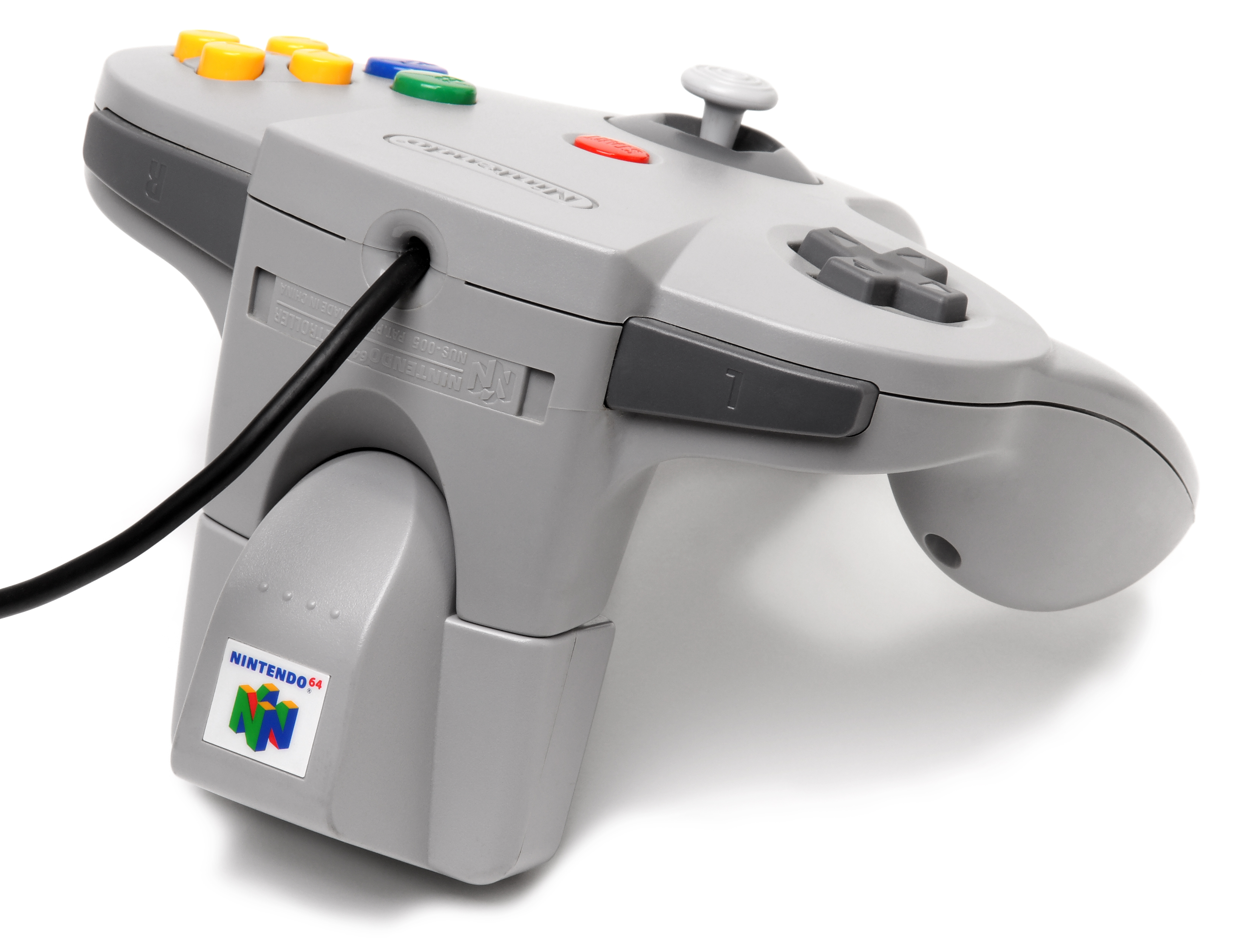
- A Nintendo 64 controller with the Rumble Pak attached
- Also known as: NUS-013
- Manufacturer: Nintendo
- Type: Haptic technology
- Generation: Fifth generation
- Released: JP: April 27, 1997; NA: July 1997; EU: October 1997
- Connectivity: N64 controller

The Rumble Pak (Japanese: 振動パック, Hepburn: Shindō Pakku) is a removable device from Nintendo that provides force feedback while playing video games. Games that support the Rumble Pak cause it to vibrate in select situations, such as when firing a weapon or receiving damage, to immerse the player in the game. Versions of the Rumble Pak are available for the Nintendo 64, the Nintendo DS, and the Nintendo DS Lite. A select few Game Boy Color and Game Boy Advance (GBA) games use a similar technology built into the game cartridge. Force feedback vibration has become a built-in standard feature in almost every home video game console controller since.

== Nintendo 64 ==
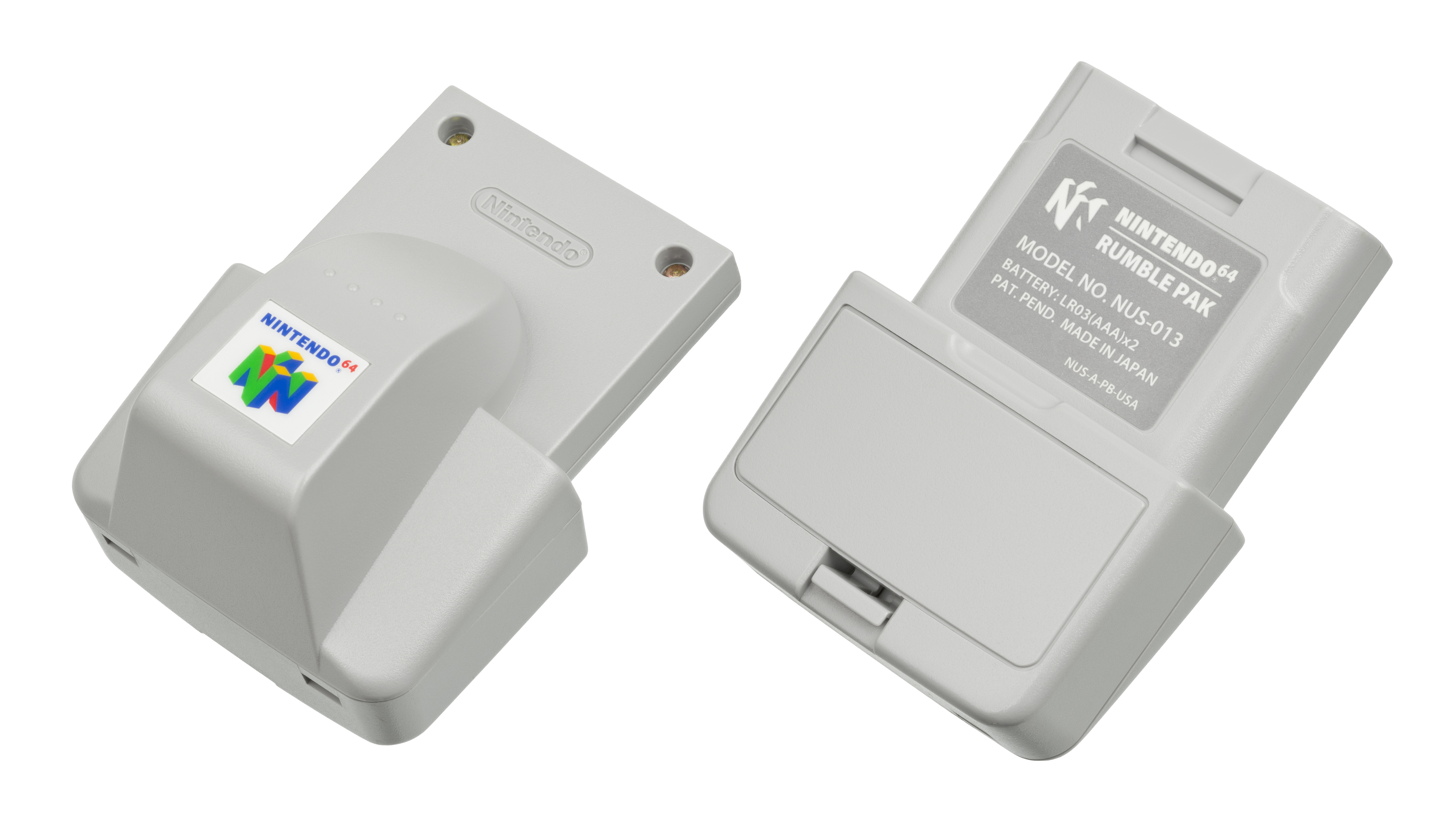
The Nintendo 64 Rumble Pak (Top and bottom views)

The original Rumble Pak, designed for the Nintendo 64 controller, was released in April 1997 in Japan, July 1997 in North America, and October 1997 in Europe. It requires two AAA batteries and is inserted into the controller's memory cartridge slot, which prevents simultaneous use of the Controller Pak. This does not significantly affect games that feature on-cartridge save functions, but is a drawback with games that require the Controller Pak to save, as software by default was not designed to support hot swapping Paks, although some games support saving to a Controller Pak in a second controller. Nintendo remedied the situation in later games by offering developers the inclusion of special screens for hot swapping. The Rumble Pak is estimated to provide 50-60 hours of continuous rumbling before the batteries must be replaced.

Originally named "Jolting Pak", it was announced as what IGN called "the biggest surprise" of the 1996 Shoshinkai show. The Rumble Pak was introduced bundled with the game Star Fox 64 (known as Lylat Wars in the PAL region) and made available as a separate purchase two months later. Rumble Pak support soon became a standard for N64 games. Wave Race 64 and Super Mario 64 were re-released in Japan in July 1997 with Rumble Pak support.

Several third party versions of the Rumble Pak, such as the Tremor Pak, followed. Some draw power from the controller instead of batteries, but the lower power makes them less effective. The TremorPak Plus allows a memory card to be inserted simultaneously, eliminating the need to switch between two accessories. The Nyko Hyper Pak Plus contains internal memory and allows the user to adjust the amount of feedback between "hard" and "too hard". Though it does not allow the use of rumble and memory functions simultaneously, users can toggle between the two functions by flipping a switch, instead of having to swap accessories.

=== Reception ===
Atomic Dawg's review of the Rumble Pak in GamePro described it as "cute, gimmicky - and actually kind of fun." When reviewing Star Fox 64, IGN praised the Rumble Pak, stating that it "adds an unusual burst of arcade ecstasy to the game". Electronic Gaming Monthly commented, "Sure, a vibrating joystick may sound lame - even a little naughty - but trust us: it's cool. The Pak's only drawback is that it slips into your analog stick's memory cartridge port and doesn't offer a through port." The magazine's "review crew" later reviewed the standalone release of the Rumble Pak, giving it an 8.5 out of 10. While Kraig Kujawa and John Ricciardi commented that its usage in games thus far had been as a gimmick rather than an enhancement to the actual gameplay, Kelly Rickards and Sushi-X lauded its usage in games such as GoldenEye 007 and Star Fox 64, and all four of them praised the low retail price of the unit, saying that at worst gamers risk little by purchasing it. At their 1997 Editors' Choice Awards, they named it "Best Peripheral".

IGN's Levi Buchanan wrote an 11th birthday article on the Nintendo 64's Rumble Pak, describing how its influence led to rumble being "an industry standard within a single generation". He said that it is bulky and heavy when attached to the Nintendo 64 controller, but that "the trade-off was actually worth it".

More recently, in TWGNews's "Top 10 Controller Innovations" article, the Rumble Pak is listed as #8, saying "the Rumble Pak added a whole new level of immersion to the fifth generation of video games".

== Nintendo DS ==
Rumble Pak
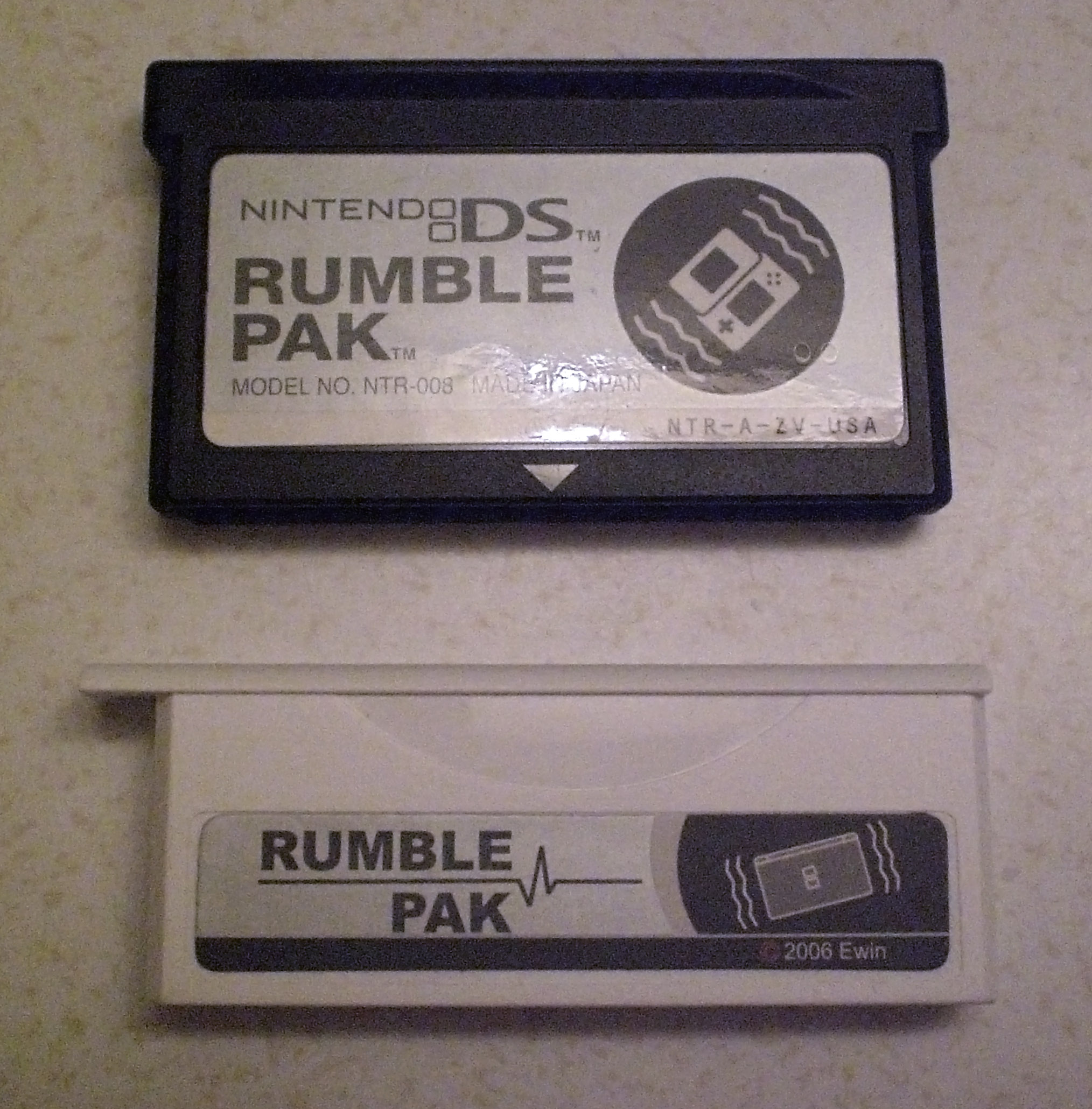
- Rumble Pak for the Nintendo DS and a third party, smaller version for the Nintendo DS Lite by eWin
- Manufacturer: Nintendo and eWin
- Type: Input device
- Generation: Seventh generation
- Connectivity: Nintendo DS Game Pak port

The Rumble Pak for the Nintendo DS is an official DS Option Pak shaped like a Game Boy Advance Game Pak and is designed to be inserted in the system's GBA game slot (SLOT-2). It is the first Nintendo DS accessory to have utilized the slot. In North America, it was first made available bundled with Metroid Prime Pinball, but was later sold through other promotions or as a stand-alone purchase from Nintendo's online store. The accessory was released differently in Europe due to a delay of Metroid Prime Pinball in that region. Various DS games supporting the Rumble Pak (Metroid Prime Hunters, Mario & Luigi: Partners in Time, and 42 All-Time Classics) had been released in Europe before the accessory was available. The accessory was eventually released as a pack-in with the game Actionloop in the UK.

Although the Rumble Pak works with both the Nintendo DS and the redesigned Nintendo DS Lite, it protrudes from the Nintendo DS Lite when inserted, as do GBA Game Paks, because of the Nintendo DS Lite's smaller size. For this reason, a smaller version of the Rumble Pak is available in Japan, which is flush with the system when inserted. It was initially available in just black, but other colors produced by unlicensed accessory manufacturer eWin, such as white (see picture), have been released. Other color variations have been released by eWin.

Some GBA flash cartridges (SLOT-2 flash cartridges) have a built-in rumble feature that, when used in tandem with a SLOT-1 flash card on a Nintendo DS, can provide rumble as if it was an ordinary Rumble Pak.

The Nintendo DS Rumble Pak is incompatible with the Nintendo DSi and Nintendo DSi XL, as both consoles lack a slot for GBA cartridges. However, none of the games required the Rumble Pak to play, meaning that those games are still compatible with those systems. Although Nintendo DSi and Nintendo DSi XL lack the GBA slot, some Nintendo DS titles released after the Nintendo DSi's launch do support the Rumble Pak accessory, likely due to the fact the Nintendo DS Lite console was sold concurrently with the Nintendo DSi and Nintendo DSi XL.

=== Reception ===
The Nintendo DS Rumble Pak was initially met with criticism as reviewers pointed out the limited number of games compatible with the card (at the time only four were compatible). Reviewers also pointed out the annoying "squealing noise" or "electronic chirp" that the device made when 'rumbling'. IGN stated that "Good thing it's free, because at this point we wouldn't bother buying it as an extra." Up until the removal of the expansion slot from later Nintendo DS models, the DS Rumble Pak was supported by 51 games in total.

== Game Boy family ==
While there is no dedicated Rumble Pak for the Game Boy family (Game Boy, Game Boy Color and Game Boy Advance), due to these more primitive systems lacking an expansion slot, there were several games released for the Game Boy's successors that featured built-in rumble. Game Boy Color games with built-in rumble, such as 10-Pin Bowling, Vigilante 8 and Star Wars Episode I: Racer, were released as bulkier Game Paks with an added rumble motor powered by an extra AAA battery that is inserted into the Game Pak itself. The only two Game Boy Advance games that feature built-in rumble, Drill Dozer and WarioWare: Twisted!, draw power from the system itself and thus do not require an extra battery. Twisted also rumbles weakly whenever its special built-in piezoelectric gyroscope for its motion controls are utilized. Other Game Boy Advance games, such as Mario & Luigi: Superstar Saga, support rumble when played on a Game Boy Player for the GameCube, utilizing its controller's built-in vibration.

== See also ==
- Game controller
- Nintendo 64 accessories
- Nintendo DS accessories
