= Majesco =

American video game publisher and distributor

Majesco Games Corporation
- Type: Subsidiary
- Traded as: Nasdaq: COOL
- Industry: Video games
- Founded: June 16, 1986; 40 years ago in Edison, New Jersey, U.S.
- Headquarters: Hazlet, New Jersey, US
- Parent: Majesco Holdings (2003–2016); PolarityTE (2016–2017); Liquid Media Group (2018–2020)
- Website: majescoent.com

Majesco Games Corporation (formerly Majesco Sales Inc. and Majesco Entertainment Company) is an American video game publisher and distributor based in Hazlet, New Jersey. The company was founded in Edison, New Jersey in 1986, and was a privately held company until acquiring the operation-less company ConnectivCorp in a reverse merger takeover, becoming its subsidiary and thus a public company on December 5, 2003. ConnectivCorp later changed its name to Majesco Holdings Inc. on April 13, 2004. Majesco applied for a NASDAQ listing in 2004.

== History ==
=== 1986–1998 ===
Majesco was first known as a reissuer of old titles that had been abandoned by their original publisher. By cutting the prices and eventually arranging the rights to self-manufacture games for both Nintendo and Sega systems, the company found a sustainable market niche.

Later, Majesco arranged with Sega to manufacture a version of its Genesis (known as Mega Drive outside North America) 16-bit console, which had been superseded by the 32-bit Saturn. It released this in 1998 as the Genesis 3 and followed up with a version of the handheld Game Gear called the Game Gear Core System. In 1998, it signed a deal with Hasbro Interactive to publish their titles for the 8-bit handheld and 16-bit console formats, notably the Game Boy Color.

=== 1998–2016 ===
The company's focus shifted to in-house game development, initially under the brand Pipe-Dream Interactive since few believed they could make the transition successfully. It was originally by two lead producers who were employees of Morning Star Multimedia, Dan Kitchen and Kevin Mitchell. Majesco had a licensing agreement with publisher Red Storm Entertainment to bring Tom Clancy's Rainbow Six to the Sega Dreamcast platform in 1999. Pipe Dream Interactive, a Majesco subsidiary would eventually produce their titles for Hasbro Interactive on the Game Boy Color and the Sega Dreamcast in 2000, most notably Q*Bert. In 2000, Majesco had a licensing agreement with Activision to publish ports of their classic titles for various platforms, most notably the PlayStation 2 and the Game Boy Advance. The following year, Majesco signed an agreement with THQ to bring its vast catalog for the Game Boy Advance for the European market, and the following year, had an agreement with Codemasters to publish two titles for PlayStation 2.

Majesco focused on developing for console systems, such as GameCube, Game Boy Advance, Xbox, and PlayStation 2. A few of the titles it released, involving popular characters, included a few Bomberman titles for the GameCube and Game Boy Advance. Majesco also published computer games with Terminal Reality as the developer, such as BloodRayne and BloodRayne 2.

In 2003, Majesco was slated to publish Black 9, but producers forced the developers, Taldren, Inc., to shut down when the game was about 85% complete. In 2004, Majesco launched the Game Boy Advance Video line of cartridges. The line was a success for the company, who reported Game Boy Advance Video as responsible for 79% of all sales in 2004. Conversely, several of the publisher's larger-budget games were considered financial failures, such as Psychonauts, which sold poorly although receiving several awards and critical acclaim, and Advent Rising, which generated intense hype but was ultimately panned by critics for being released prematurely and without adequate bug testing.

On January 19, 2006, the company's financial situation worsened to the degree that it had to cancel two games it was going to publish: Demonik, developed by Terminal Reality, and Taxi Driver, a sequel to the 1976 film of the same name. Majesco's president, Jesse Sutton, said that in the future the company would "focus primarily on publishing value and handheld video games." Since that announcement, the company has followed through with publishing successful budget titles in North America like Cooking Mama for the Nintendo DS.

On September 14, 2006, Majesco released Advent Rising and re-released BloodRayne and BloodRayne 2 on Steam. On November 6, 2007, Majesco announced the opening of a new development facility in the Los Angeles area dedicated to the development of casual game products and properties. On December 10, 2007, Majesco announced that they would be publishing a rhythm-based game, Major Minor's Majestic March, exclusively for the Wii developed by NanaOn-Sha. Majesco has announced that it will be launching an internet version of Bananagrams on August 18, 2008, that will be available on Facebook, a social networking website. On November 4, 2009, Majesco released BloodRayne and BloodRayne 2 on GOG.com. On June 6, 2011, Majesco announced that it was acquiring the assets of social game developer Quick Hit and Quick Hit Football to build out its social gaming strategy.

After a disastrous fiscal year of 2013, the company was expected to enjoy a recovering growth in 2014. It has an online casino gambling subsidiary GMS Entertainment. However, this proved incorrect, as they continued to lose large amounts of money in 2014, resulting in the closure of Midnight City and the cancellation of the console port of Gone Home.

On August 12, 2015, Majesco announced that they had appointed a new CEO, and that only five employees would remain in the company. The company's focus also shifted to develop mobile and downloadable titles. Two new titles, Glue and a new installment in the A Boy and His Blob franchise, were announced after the reconstruction.

On December 9, 2016, Majesco announced it was ceasing operations in the entertainment industry, and merged with biotech firm PolarityTE. Polarity will obtain Majesco's NASDAQ symbol name, COOL. On June 29, 2017, PolarityTE divested itself entirely of and subsequently sold, Majesco's assets, which were subsequently taken private, leading to the rebirth of the company as an independent corporation.

=== 2017–present ===
On November 9, 2017, Majesco announced that it had re-entered the video game business after having previously been brought back to a privately held company, releasing their Romans from Mars onto Steam. Liquid Media Group purchased a 51% controlling stake in Majesco in January 2018, and Jesse Sutton became the group's gaming advisor. The company announced Coba: Tale of the Moon for the Nintendo Switch on December 7, 2018. Due to unpaid fees from the acquisition, Liquid Media Group settled with Sutton in August 2020 to return the shares to him.

On June 15, 2020, Ziggurat Interactive purchased a number of IP formerly owned by Majesco including the rights to BloodRayne, Advent Rising, Flip's Twisted World, and Raze's Hell. On the same day, Ziggurat announced that the PC release of BloodRayne would receive updates to improve compatibility with current-day systems, with updates done by original developer Terminal Reality. They also announced plans to continue the franchise.

In 2021, Majesco announced Monster Tale for the Nintendo Switch with an expected release later that year.

== Controversies and lawsuits ==
Majesco was accused by former employees of Taldren, Inc. of forcing the company to shut down in an attempt to gain ownership of the Black9 IP. They alleged the company delayed payment of milestones and used "programmer assistance" to try and gain control of the source code.

To promote the release of Advent Rising, a million dollars was offered in a contest via Xbox Live for the first player to find a set of hidden symbols spread throughout the levels of the game. On August 15, 2005, the contest was cancelled, due to concerns that there was "no technically feasible solution that would allow the contest to continue in a fair and secure manner". Majesco offered, as compensation to those players, the choice of two free games (BloodRayne 2, Guilty Gear X2 #Reload, Psychonauts, Raze's Hell, and/or Phantom Dust) and an apology on its home page.

A class action lawsuit was brought against the company by shareholders in 2005, they alleged the company had sent product to retailers knowing it would be returned in an attempt to boost revenue projections and raise the stock price. In 2006, a second lawsuit was filed by Trinad Capital Master Fund who accused the company of mismanagement. The lawsuit was settled in 2007.

In 2011, Majesco was among a list of defendants who were sued over alleged patent violations relating to the use of motion controls in video games for the Nintendo Wii. In 2018, the Federal Circuit court ruled in favor of Majesco and other defendants in the case.

== Subsidiaries ==
- Pipe Dream Interactive
- Majesco Studios Santa Monica
- Midnight City: On August 29, 2013, Majesco announced the creation of an indie publishing label, Midnight City, in order to bring various indie games to consoles.

== Games published ==
- Advent Rising (Xbox, Microsoft Windows)
- Æon Flux (PlayStation 2, Xbox)
- Age of Empires: The Age of Kings (Nintendo DS)
- Air Traffic Chaos (Nintendo DS)
- Alvin and the Chipmunks: The Squeakquel (Nintendo DS, Wii)
- Alvin and the Chipmunks: Chipwrecked (Nintendo DS, Wii, Xbox 360)
- Attack of the Movies 3D (Wii, Xbox 360)
- ATV: Quad Frenzy (Nintendo DS)
- Away: Shuffle Dungeon (Nintendo DS), North America
- Babysitting Mama (Wii)
- Babysitting Mania (Nintendo DS)
- BattleBots: Beyond the BattleBox (Game Boy Advance)
- BattleBots: Design & Destroy (Game Boy Advance)
- Black & Bruised (GameCube, PlayStation 2)
- Blast Works: Build, Trade, Destroy (Wii)
- Blokus Portable: Steambot Championship (PSP)
- BloodRayne (PlayStation 2, GameCube, Xbox, Microsoft Windows)
- BloodRayne 2 (PlayStation 2, Xbox, Microsoft Windows)
- BloodRayne: Betrayal (PS3, Xbox 360)
- BlowOut (PlayStation 2, GameCube, Xbox and Xbox Originals on Xbox 360, Microsoft Windows)
- Bomberman Generation (GameCube)
- Bomberman Jetters (GameCube)
- Bomberman Max 2: Blue Advance (Game Boy Advance)
- Bomberman Max 2: Red Advance (Game Boy Advance)
- Boxing Fever (Game Boy Advance)
- A Boy and His Blob (Wii)
- Brain Boost: Beta Wave (Nintendo DS), North America
- Brain Boost: Gamma Wave (Nintendo DS), North America
- Bust-A-Move Bash! (Wii)
- Bust-a-Move Deluxe (Nintendo DS)
- Bust-a-Move DS (Nintendo DS), North America
- Camping Mama (Nintendo DS), North America
- Cartoon Network: Block Party (Game Boy Advance)
- Centipede (video game) (Game Boy Color)
- Cooking Mama (Nintendo DS), North America
- Camping Mama: Outdoor Adventures (Nintendo DS), North America
- Cooking Mama: Cook Off (Wii), North America
- Cooking Mama 2: Dinner with Friends (Nintendo DS), North America
- Cooking Mama: World Kitchen (Wii), North America
- Cooking Mama 3: Shop & Chop (Nintendo DS), North America
- Cooking Mama 4: Kitchen Magic (Nintendo 3DS), North America
- Cooking Mama 5: Bon Appétit! (Nintendo 3DS), North America
- Costume Quest 2 (Linux, OS X, Windows, Playstation 3, Playstation 4, Wii U, Xbox 360, Xbox One)
- Crafting Mama (Nintendo DS)
- Crash City Mayhem (Nintendo 3DS)
- Dance Sensation! (Wii)
- The Daring Game for Girls (Nintendo DS, Wii)
- Dark Arena (Game Boy Advance)
- Data East Arcade Classics (Wii)
- Dawn of Heroes (Nintendo DS)
- Dino Master: Dig, Discover, Duel (Nintendo DS)
- Double Dragon Neon developed by WayForward Technologies (PS3, Xbox 360)
- Drake of the 99 Dragons (Xbox, Microsoft Windows)
- Drama Queens (Nintendo DS)
- Eco Creatures: Save the Forest (Nintendo DS), North America
- Escape the Museum (Wii)
- F-14 Tomcat (Game Boy Advance)
- F-18 Thunder Strike (Game Boy Color)
- F24: Stealth Fighter (Nintendo DS)
- Face Racers: Photo Finish (Nintendo 3DS)
- Fish Tycoon (Nintendo DS)
- Flip's Twisted World developed by Frozen North Productions (Wii)
- Fortress (Game Boy Advance)
- Freddi Fish: Kelp Seed Mystery (Wii)
- Furu Furu Park (Wii), North America
- FusionFall (PC)
- Gardening Mama (Nintendo DS), North America
- Gardening Mama 2: Forest Friends (Nintendo 3DS), North America
- Geminose: Animal Popstars (Nintendo Switch)
- Girl Fight (PlayStation 3, Xbox 360)
- Global Touring Challenge: Africa (PlayStation 2)
- Go Play: Circus Star (Wii)
- Go Play: City Sports (Wii)
- Go Play: Lumberjacks (Wii)
- Golden Nugget Casino DS (Nintendo DS)
- Greg Hastings' Paintball 2 (PS3, Wii, Xbox 360)
- Guilty Gear Dust Strikers (Nintendo DS)
- Guilty Gear: Judgment (PSP)
- Guilty Gear X2 #Reload (Xbox)
- Gun Metal (Xbox, Microsoft Windows)
- Hello Kitty Party (Nintendo DS)
- The Hidden (Nintendo 3DS)
- Hot and Cold: A 3D Hidden Object Adventure (Nintendo DSiWare)
- Hulk Hogan's Main Event (Kinect)
- HSX: Hypersonic Xtreme (PlayStation 2)
- Infected (PSP)
- Jaws Unleashed (PlayStation 2, Xbox, Microsoft Windows)
- Jillian Michaels' Fitness Ultimatum 2009 (Wii)
- Jillian Michaels' Fitness Ultimatum 2010 (Nintendo DS, Wii)
- Jillian Michaels' Pocket Trainer (Nintendo DS)
- KarmaStar (iPhone, iPod Touch)
- Kengo: Legend of the 9 (Xbox 360)
- Kong: King of Atlantis (Game Boy Advance)
- Left Brain, Right Brain (Nintendo DS)
- Left Brain, Right Brain 2 (Nintendo DS)
- Let's Draw (Nintendo DS)
- Lion's Pride: Adventures in the Serengeti (Nintendo 3DS)
- Mad Dog McCree: Gunslinger Pack (Wii)
- Major Minor's Majestic March (Wii)
- Marker Man Adventures (Nintendo DS)
- Maximum Chase (Xbox), published
- MechAssault: Phantom War (Nintendo DS)
- Mega Brain Boost (Nintendo DS)
- Mickey Mouse Camping Trip (Nintendo DS)
- Monaco: What's Yours Is Mine (Xbox 360)
- Monster Bomber (Nintendo DS)
- Monster Tale (Nintendo DS)
- Monster Trucks (Game Boy Advance)
- Monster Trucks DS (Nintendo DS)
- My Baby 3 & Friends (Nintendo DS)
- Nacho Libre (Nintendo DS)
- Nancy Drew: The Deadly Secret of Olde World Park (Nintendo DS)
- Nancy Drew: The Mystery of the Clue Bender Society (Nintendo DS)
- Nano Assault (Nintendo 3DS)
- Nanostray (Nintendo DS)
- Nanostray 2 (Nintendo DS)
- NBA Baller Beats (Kinect)
- The New York Times Crosswords (Nintendo DS)
- Night at the Museum: Battle of the Smithsonian (Nintendo DS, Wii, Xbox 360, Microsoft Windows)
- Operation: Vietnam (Nintendo DS)
- Orchard (Microsoft Windows)
- Our House (Nintendo DS)
- Pajama Sam: Don't Fear The Dark (Wii)
- Pet Pals: Animal Doctor (Nintendo DS)
- Pet Zombies in 3D (Nintendo 3DS)
- Phantom Dust (Xbox)
- Pirates Plund-Arrr (Wii)
- Pizza Delivery Boy (Wii)
- Powerbike (Nintendo DS)
- Psychonauts (PlayStation 2, Xbox and Xbox Originals on Xbox 360, Microsoft Windows)
- Puffins: Island Adventure (Nintendo DS)
- Quad Desert Fury (Game Boy Advance)
- Raze's Hell (Xbox and Xbox Originals on Xbox 360)
- Rollin' Rascals (Nintendo DS)
- Sharknado: The Video Game (iOS)
- Sideswiped (Nintendo DS)
- Spy Fox in "Dry Cereal" (Wii)
- Spy Kids: All the Time in the World (Nintendo DS)
- Summer Camp Showdown (Wii)
- Super Black Bass Fishing (Nintendo DS)
- Super Hornet F/A 18F (Game Boy Advance)
- Super Speed Machines (Nintendo DS)
- Swords (Wii)
- Teen Titans (Game Boy Advance)
- Teen Titans (PlayStation 2, GameCube, Xbox), Originally published by THQ
- Teen Titans 2: The Brotherhood's Revenge (Game Boy Advance)
- Texas Hold 'Em Poker (Nintendo DS)
- Toon-Doku (Nintendo DS)
- Totaled! (Xbox)
- Toy Shop (Nintendo DS)
- Turn It Around (Nintendo DS)
- Twister Mania (Kinect)
- Ultimate Game Room (Nintendo DS)
- Ultra Bust-a-Move (Xbox)
- Wild Earth: African Safari (Wii)
- Wonder World Amusement Park (Nintendo 3DS, Nintendo DS, Wii)
- Worms 4: Mayhem (Xbox), North America
- Zoo Hospital (Nintendo DS, Wii)
- Zumba Fitness (Kinect, PlayStation Move, Wii)
