= List of Nintendo DS games (J–P) =

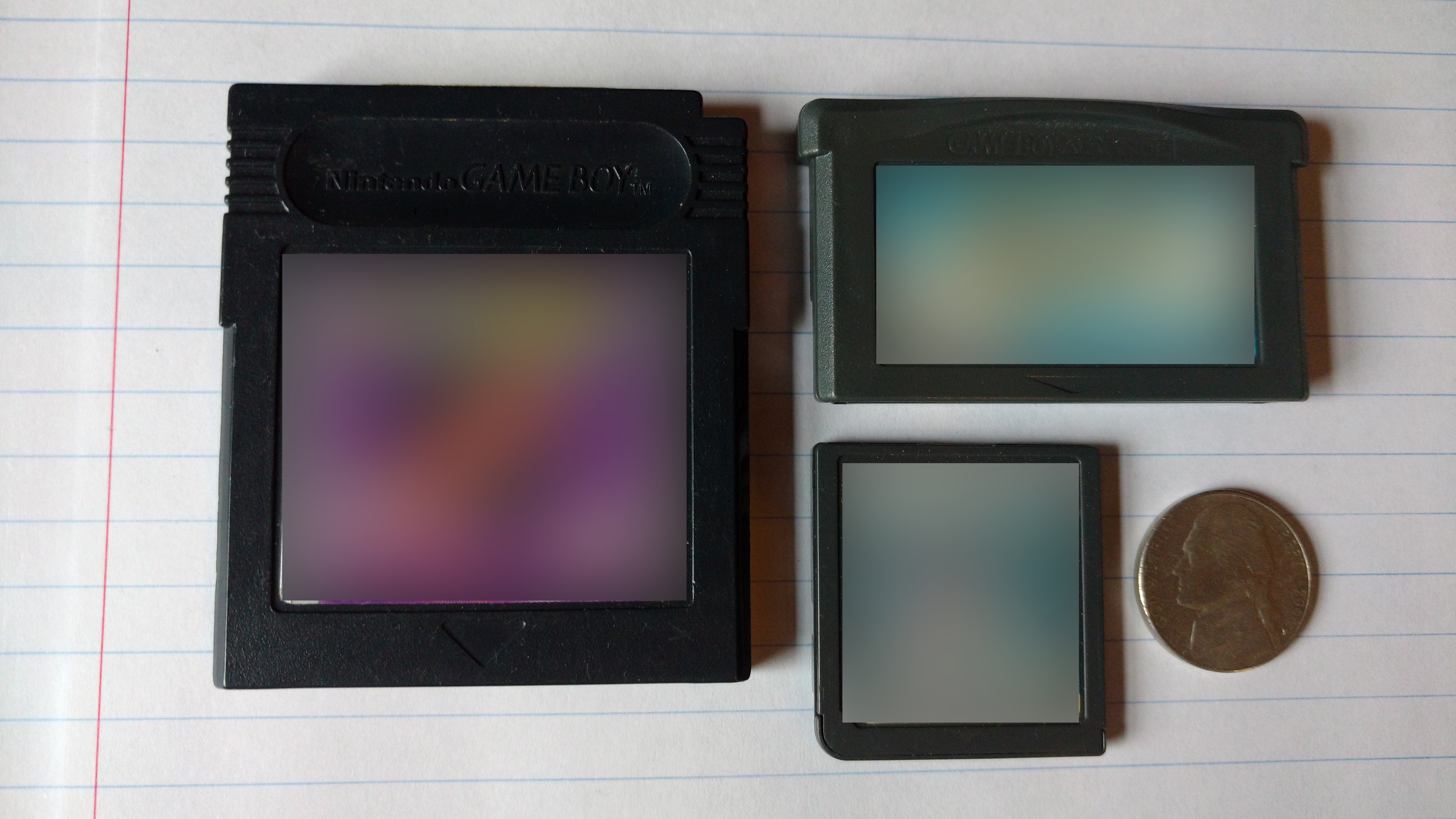
Clockwise from left: A Game Boy game cartridge, a Game Boy Advance game cartridge, and a Nintendo DS game card. On the far right is a United States Nickel shown for scale.

This is a list of physical video games for the Nintendo DS, DS Lite, and DSi handheld game consoles. It does not include games released on DSiWare or the iQue DS. The last game for the Nintendo DS, Big Hero 6: Battle in the Bay, was released on October 28, 2014.

== Games ==
There are currently 3243 games in this table across all pages: 0 to C, D to I, J to P, and Q to Z.

Title	Developer(s)	Publisher(s)	First released	JP	NA	EU	AU
J4G - A Girl's World	Snapdragon Games	dtp Young Entertainment AG	September 8, 2009 (EU)	No	No	Yes	Yes
Jackass: The Game	Sensory Sweep Studios	MTV Games, Red Mile Entertainment	January 8, 2008 (NA)	No	Yes	Yes	Yes
Jacqueline Wilson's Tracy Beaker: The Game	Snapdragon Games	dtp Young Entertainment AG	October 16, 2010 (EU)	No	No	Yes	No
Jagged Alliance DS	Strategy First, Cypron Studios	Atari	October 28, 2008 (NA)	No	Yes	No	No
Jaka Jaka Music!	Plato	Plato	September 23, 2010 (JP)	Yes	No	No	No
Jake Hunter Detective Story: Memories of the Past; Tantei Jinguuji Saburou DS: Inishie no Kioku^{JP}	WorkJam	Aksys Games	July 19, 2007 (JP)	Yes	Yes	Yes	No
Jake Hunter: Detective Chronicles	WorkJam	Arc System Works, Aksys Games	July 19, 2007 (JP)	Yes	Yes	No	No
Jake Power: Firefighter; Tim Power: Firefighter^{EU} Sam Power: Firefighter^{AUS}	Ubisoft	Ubisoft	November 21, 2008 (EU)	No	Yes	Yes	Yes
Jake Power: Handyman; Tim Power: Handyman^{EU} Sam Power: Handyman^{AUS}	Ubisoft	Ubisoft	November 21, 2008 (EU)	No	Yes	Yes	Yes
Jake Power: Policeman; Tim Power: Policeman^{EU} Sam Power: Policeman^{AUS}	Ubisoft	Ubisoft	November 21, 2008 (EU)	No	Yes	Yes	Yes
Jake Power: Soccer Star; Tim Power: Footballer^{EU} Sam Power: Soccer Star^{AUS}	Ubisoft	Ubisoft	November 21, 2008 (EU)	No	Yes	Yes	Yes
Jam Sessions 2	Plato	Plato, Ubisoft	October 20, 2009 (NA)	No	Yes	No	No
Jam with the Band	Nintendo	Nintendo	June 26, 2008 (JP)	Yes	No	Yes	No
Jambo! Safari: Animal Rescue	Sega	Sega	November 17, 2009 (NA)	No	Yes	No	No
James Bond 007: Blood Stone	n-Space	Activision	November 2, 2010 (NA)	No	Yes	Yes	No
James Cameron's Avatar: The Game	Ubisoft	Ubisoft	December 1, 2009 (NA)	Yes	Yes	Yes	Yes
James Patterson Women's Murder Club: Games of Passion	Griptonite Games	THQ	September 22, 2009 (NA)	No	Yes	Yes	Yes
James Pond: RoboCod	Creature Labs	Play It!, Codemasters	December 8, 2005 (PAL)	No	Yes	Yes	No
Jan Sangoku Musou	Koei	Koei	September 28, 2006 (JP)	Yes	No	No	No
Jane's Hotel	Zoo Games	Zoo Games	May 4, 2010 (NA)	No	Yes	No	No
Jelly Belly: Ballistic Beans!	Blue Monkey Studios	Zoo Digital Publishing	March 27, 2009 (EU)	No	Yes	Yes	No
Jenga World Tour	Atomic Planet Entertainment	Atari	November 13, 2007 (NA)	No	Yes	Yes	No
Jeopardy!	Griptonite Games	THQ	November 2, 2010 (NA)	No	Yes	No	No
Jet Impulse	Nintendo	Nintendo	February 8, 2007 (JP)	Yes	No	No	No
Jetix Puzzle Buzzle	Blast! Entertainment	Blast! Entertainment	April 4, 2008 (PAL)	No	No	Yes	No
Jewel Adventures	Mastertronic	Mastertronic	October 19, 2012 (EU)	No	Yes	Yes	No
Jewel Legends: Tree of Life	Rising Star Games	Rising Star Games	June 17, 2011 (EU)	No	Yes	Yes	No
Jewel Link Chronicles: Mountains of Madness	Avanquest Software	Avanquest Software	November 25, 2011 (EU)	No	Yes	Yes	No
Jewel Link: Arctic Quest	Avanquest Software	Avanquest Software	September 13, 2013 (EU)	No	Yes	Yes	No
Jewel Link: Atlantic Quest	Avanquest Software	Avanquest Software	February 17, 2012 (EU)	No	Yes	Yes	No
Jewel Link: Galactic Quest	Avanquest Software	Avanquest Software	September 7, 2012 (EU)	No	Yes	Yes	No
Jewel Link: Legends of Atlantis	Avanquest Software	Avanquest Software	July 6, 2012 (EU)	No	Yes	Yes	No
Jewel Link: Safari Quest	Avanquest Software	Avanquest Software	March 1, 2013 (EU)	No	Yes	Yes	No
Jewel Master: Cradle of Athena	Cerasus Media	Storm City Games	October 5, 2010 (NA)	No	Yes	Yes	No
Jewel Master: Cradle of Egypt 2	Cerasus Media	Rising Star Games	November 6, 2012 (NA)	No	Yes	Yes	No
Jewel Master: Cradle of Persia	Cerasus Media	Rising Star Games	July 24, 2012 (NA)	No	Yes	Yes	No
Jewel Master: Cradle of Rome 2	Cerasus Media	Rising Star Games	June 26, 2012 (NA)	No	Yes	Yes	No
Jewel Master: Egypt	Cerasus Media	Storm City Games	November 23, 2009 (NA)	No	Yes	Yes	No
Jewel Match	Joindots	Atari SA	July 5, 2011 (NA)	No	Yes	Yes	No
Jewel Match 2	Joindots	Easy Interactive	March 2, 2012 (NA)	No	Yes	Yes	No
Jewel Match 3	Suricate Software	Purple Hills	November 30, 2012 (EU)	No	No	Yes	No
Jewel Pet: Kawaii Mahou no Fantasy	MTO	MTO	April 30, 2009 (JP)	Yes	No	No	No
Jewel Pet: Mahou no DS Kirapi Kariin	MTO	MTO	December 17, 2009 (JP)	Yes	No	No	No
Jewel Pet: Mahou no Oheyya de Issho ni Asobou!	MTO	MTO	August 5, 2010 (JP)	Yes	No	No	No
Jewel Quest IV: Heritage	Engine Software	iWin	August 26, 2011 (EU)	No	No	Yes	No
Jewel Quest Mysteries 2: Trail of the Midnight Heart	Licensed 4U	Licensed 4U	November 25, 2011 (EU)	No	No	Yes	No
Jewel Quest Mysteries 3: The Seventh Gate	Licensed 4U	Licensed 4U	June 29, 2012 (EU)	No	No	Yes	No
Jewel Quest Mysteries: Curse of the Emerald Tear	Avanquest Software	Avanquest Software	April 23, 2010 (EU)	No	No	Yes	No
Jewel Quest Solitaire	Avanquest	Global Software Publishing	April 9, 2009 (EU)	No	No	Yes	No
Jewel Quest V: The Sleepless Star	Licensed 4U	Licensed 4U	April 6, 2012 (EU)	No	No	Yes	No
Jewel Quest: Expeditions	iWin	Activision Value	September 18, 2007 (NA)	No	Yes	Yes	No
Jewel Quest: Solitaire Trio	iWin	Avanquest Software	March 25, 2011 (EU)	No	No	Yes	No
Jewel Time Deluxe	Oxygen Interactive	O-Games	June 17, 2011 (EU)	No	Yes	Yes	No
Jewels of the Ages	City Interactive	City Interactive	June 28, 2011 (EU)	No	Yes	Yes	No
Jewels of the Tropical Lost Island	City Interactive	City Interactive	October 12, 2010 (EU)	No	Yes	Yes	No
The Jidousha Kyoushuusho DS	D3 Publisher	D3 Publisher	May 31, 2007 (JP)	Yes	No	No	No
Jig-a-Pix Love Is...	Frame Studios Interactive	Zushi Games Ltd	February 5, 2010 (EU)	No	No	Yes	No
Jig-a-Pix Pets	Frame Studios Interactive	Destineer	March 2, 2010 (EU)	No	Yes	Yes	No
Jig-a-Pix Wild World	Frame Studios Interactive	Destineer	March 4, 2010 (EU)	No	Yes	Yes	No
Jig-a-Pix Wonderful World	Frame Studios Interactive	Destineer	March 30, 2010 (EU)	No	Yes	Yes	No
Jigoku Shōjo Akekazura	Compile Heart	Compile Heart	September 27, 2007 (JP)	Yes	No	No	No
Jigsaw Puzzle DS: DS de Meguru Sekai Isan no Tabi	Hudson Soft	Hudson Soft	March 6, 2008 (JP)	Yes	No	No	No
Jigsaw World: Daigekitou! Jig-Battle Heroes	Nippon Ichi Software	Nippon Ichi Software	June 26, 2008 (JP)	Yes	No	No	No
Jinsei Game	Takara Tomy	Takara Tomy	December 3, 2009 (JP)	Yes	No	No	No
Jinsei Game DS	Atlus	Atlus	July 27, 2006 (JP)	Yes	No	No	No
Jinsei Game Q DS: Heisei no Dekigoto	Takara Tomy	Takara Tomy	December 27, 2007 (JP)	Yes	No	No	No
Jinsei Game Q DS: Shouwa no Dekigoto	Takara Tomy	Takara Tomy	December 27, 2007 (JP)	Yes	No	No	No
Jissen Pachi-Slot Hisshouhou! DS: Aladdin II Evolution	Sammy Studios	Sega	March 30, 2006 (JP)	Yes	No	No	No
Jissen Pachi-Slot Hisshouhou! DS: Pachi-Slot Hokuto no Ken SE	Sammy Studios	Sega	March 10, 2006 (JP)	Yes	No	No	No
Jissen Pachi-Slot Hisshōhō! DS: Hokuto no Ken	Sammy Studios	Sega	June 4, 2005 (JP)	Yes	No	No	No
Joan Jade and the Gates of Xibalba	Alawar Entertainment	Easy Interactive	November 24, 2011 (EU)	No	No	Yes	No
John Deere: Harvest in the Heartland	Black Lantern Studios	Destineer, Ubisoft	November 20, 2007 (NA)	No	Yes	Yes	No
Johnny Bravo In The Hukka Mega Mighty Ultra Extreme Date-O-Rama!	EM Studios	MumboJumbo	February 6, 2011 (EU)	No	Yes	Yes	No
Johnny no Dasshutsu Daisakusen	Success	Success	August 28, 2008 (JP)	Yes	No	No	No
Johnny Test	Sarbakan Inc.	505 Games	March 29, 2011 (NA)	No	Yes	No	No
Jojo's Fashion Show	GameLab	Ubisoft	January 27, 2009 (NA)	No	Yes	Yes	No
Jonas	Altron	Disney Interactive Studios	November 10, 2009 (NA)	No	Yes	Yes	Yes
Joshikousei Nigeru! Shinrei Puzzle Gakuen	Skonec	Success	January 24, 2008 (JP)	Yes	No	No	No
Journey to the Center of the Earth	Human Soft	THQ	June 27, 2008 (PAL)	No	Yes	Yes	Yes
Juggler DS	Commonseed	Commonseed	November 13, 2008 (JP)	Yes	No	No	No
Juiced 2: Hot Import Nights	Juice Games	THQ	September 17, 2007 (NA)	No	Yes	Yes	No
Jumble Madness	Anino Entertainment	Destineer	January 20, 2010 (NA)	No	Yes	No	No
Jump Super Stars	Ganbarion	Nintendo, Tommo	August 8, 2005 (JP)	Yes	No	No	No
Jump Ultimate Stars	Ganbarion	Nintendo, Tommo	November 23, 2006 (JP)	Yes	No	No	No
JumpStart: Deep Sea Escape	Knowledge Adventure Inc.	Knowledge Adventure Inc.	March 15, 2011 (NA)	No	Yes	No	No
JumpStart: Legend of Lost Island	Knowledge Adventure Inc.	Knowledge Adventure Inc.	March 25, 2011 (NA)	No	Yes	No	No
Jungle School	SouthPeak Games	SouthPeak Games	November 29, 2011 (NA)	No	Yes	No	No
Junior Brain Trainer (Note: Primarily an educational application, though it includes unlockable mini-games such as Snakes, Football, Beggar My Neighbour, Balloon Pop, Twins and Ghosts.)	Avanquest Software	Avanquest Software	December 5, 2008 (EU)	No	Yes	Yes	Yes
Junior Brain Trainer 2 (Note: Primarily an educational application, though it includes unlockable mini-games such as Snake and Hangman.)	Avanquest Software	Avanquest Software	February 8, 2011 (EU)	No	Yes	Yes	Yes
Junior Brain Trainer: Math Edition	Avanquest Software	Avanquest Software	March 16, 2011 (EU)	No	Yes	Yes	Yes
Junior Classic Games	Avanquest Software	Avanquest Software	August 7, 2009 (EU)	No	Yes	Yes	Yes
Junior Island Adventure	CyberPlanet Interactive	Maximum Family Games	September 6, 2011 (NA)	No	Yes	No	No
Junior Mystery Quest; Junior Mystery Stories^{EU}	Maximum Family Games	Maximum Family Games	April 22, 2011 (EU)	No	Yes	Yes	No
Just Sing!	Engine Software	Conspiracy Entertainment	July 2, 2010 (NA)	No	Yes	Yes	No
Just Sing! 2	Engine Software	PQube	September 23, 2011 (NA)	No	Yes	Yes	No
Just Sing! 3	Engine Software	PQube	2012 (PAL)	No	No	Yes	No
Justice League Heroes	Sensory Sweep Studios	Eidos Interactive, Warner Bros. Interactive Entertainment	October 17, 2006 (NA)	No	Yes	Yes	No
Juushin Embu DS	ThinkArts	D3Publisher	November 22, 2007 (JP)	Yes	No	No	No
Juushinden: Ultimate Beast Battlers	Konami	Konami	December 6, 2007 (JP)	Yes	No	No	No
K-1 World GP	D3 Publisher	D3 Publisher	December 6, 2007 (JP)	Yes	No	No	No
K11: Kommissare im Einsatz	Sproing	SevenOne Intermedia	March 9, 2009 (EU)	No	No	Yes	No
K3 en de vrolijke noten	Studio 100 NV	Studio 100 NV	April 8, 2011 (EU)	No	No	Yes	No
K3 en het Ijsprinsesje	Easy Interactive	Easy Interactive	2008 (EU)	No	No	Yes	No
K3 Fashion Party	Mindscape	Mindscape	2011 (EU)	No	No	Yes	No
K3 Karaoke	Mindscape	Mindscape	2011 (EU)	No	No	Yes	No
Kabu Trader Shun	Capcom	Capcom	June 7, 2007 (JP)	Yes	No	No	No
Kabushiki Baibai Trainer: Kabutore!	Konami	Konami	December 14, 2006 (JP)	Yes	No	No	No
Kabushiki Baibai Trainer: Kabutore! Next	Konami	Konami	November 29, 2007 (JP)	Yes	No	No	No
Kachō Shima Kōsaku DS: Dekiru Otoko no Love & Success	Konami	Konami	March 19, 2008 (JP)	Yes	No	No	No
Kageyama Hideo no IQ Teacher DS	IE Institute	IE Institute	November 27, 2008 (JP)	Yes	No	No	No
Kaidan Restaurant: Ura Menu 100-Sen (Note: Primarily a collection of interactive ghost stories, though it includes horror-themed mini-games unlocked using coins earned by reading the stories.)	Bandai Namco Games	Bandai Namco Games	June 3, 2010 (JP)	Yes	No	No	No
Kaidan Restaurant: Zoku! Shin Menu 100-Sen (Note: Primarily a collection of interactive ghost stories, though it includes unlockable horror-themed mini-games and a timing-based ghost-catching activity.)	Bandai Namco Games	Bandai Namco Games	June 30, 2011 (JP)	Yes	No	No	No
Kaiichi Otto Sensei Tokyo Daigaku Kanshuu: Sukusuku Kosodate DS: Akachan to Asobou!	Marvelous Entertainment	Marvelous Entertainment	April 24, 2008 (JP)	Yes	No	No	No
Kaijuu Busters	Bandai Namco Games	Bandai Namco Games	December 3, 2008 (JP)	Yes	No	No	No
Kaijuu Busters Powered	Bandai Namco Games	Bandai Namco Games	January 20, 2011 (JP)	Yes	No	No	No
Kaite Oboeru: Dora-Gana	Sega	Sega	November 27, 2008 (JP)	Yes	No	No	No
Kaite Shabette Hajimeyou! Monster Farm DS; Monster Farm^{KR}	Tecmo	Tecmo	July 12, 2007 (JP)	Yes	No	No	No
Kaitou Rousseau	Namco	Bandai Namco Games	June 15, 2006 (JP)	Yes	No	No	No
Kaizoku Sentai Gokaiger: Atsumete Henshin! 35 Sentai	Bandai Namco Games	Bandai Namco Games	November 17, 2011 (JP)	Yes	No	No	No
Kakuromaniacs	FrontLine Studios	White Park Bay	June 8, 2007 (EU)	No	No	Yes	No
Kambayashi Shiki Nouryoku Kaihatsu Hou: Unou Kids DS	IE Institute	IE Institute	March 30, 2006 (JP)	Yes	No	No	No
Kamen Rider Battle Ganbaride: Card Battle Taisen	Natsume Co., Ltd.	Bandai	July 29, 2010 (JP)	Yes	No	No	No
Kamen Rider: Dragon Knight	Natsume Co., Ltd.	D3 Publisher	November 17, 2009 (NA)	No	Yes	No	No
Ōkamiden	Capcom	Capcom	September 30, 2010 (JP)	Yes	Yes	Yes	Yes
Kamo no Hashikamo. Aimai Seikatsu no Susume	ASCII Media Works	ASCII Media Works	December 3, 2009 (JP)	Yes	No	No	No
Kangaeru Chikara o Gungun Nobasu! DS Youji no Nou Tore	ShoPro	ShoPro	July 24, 2008 (JP)	Yes	No	No	No
Kanji no Wataridori	Success	Success	June 1, 2006 (JP)	Yes	No	No	No
Kanshū Nippon Jōshikiryoku Kentei Kyōkai: Imasara Hito ni wa Kikenai Otona no Jōshikiryoku Training DS	HAL Laboratory	Nintendo	October 26, 2006 (JP)	Yes	No	No	No
Katekyo Hitman Reborn DS: Fate of Heat	Takara Tomy	Takara Tomy	May 1, 2008 (JP)	Yes	No	No	No
Katekyo Hitman Reborn! Bongole Shiki Taisen Battle Sugoroku!!	Takara Tomy	Takara Tomy	March 27, 2008 (JP)	Yes	No	No	No
Katekyo Hitman Reborn! DS – Shinuki Max! Vongola Carnival!!	Takara Tomy	Takara Tomy	March 29, 2007 (JP)	Yes	No	No	No
Katekyo Hitman Reborn! DS Fate of Heat II - Unmei no Futari	Takara Tomy	Takara Tomy	April 16, 2009 (JP)	Yes	No	No	No
Katekyo Hitman Reborn! DS Fate of Heat III - Yuki no Shugosha Raishuu!	Takara Tomy	Takara Tomy	April 29, 2010 (JP)	Yes	No	No	No
Katekyo Hitman Reborn! DS Flame Rumble Hyper - Moeyo Mirai	Takara Tomy	Takara Tomy	July 24, 2008 (JP)	Yes	No	No	No
Katekyo Hitman Reborn! DS Flame Rumble Kaien Ring Soudatsuen!	Takara Tomy	Takara Tomy	September 20, 2007 (JP)	Yes	No	No	No
Katekyo Hitman Reborn! DS Flame Rumble Mukuro Kyoushuu	Takara Tomy	Takara Tomy	June 28, 2007 (JP)	Yes	No	No	No
Katekyo Hitman Reborn! DS Flame Rumble X	Takara Tomy	Takara Tomy	July 23, 2009 (JP)	Yes	No	No	No
Katekyo Hitman Reborn! DS Flame Rumble XX - Kessen! Real 6 Chouka	Takara Tomy	Takara Tomy	July 22, 2010 (JP)	Yes	No	No	No
Katekyo Hitman Reborn! DS: Mafia Daishuugou Bongole Festival	Takara Tomy	Takara Tomy	December 4, 2008 (JP)	Yes	No	No	No
Katekyo Hitman Reborn! Ore ga Boss! Saikyou Family Taisen	Takara Tomy	Takara Tomy	December 17, 2009 (JP)	Yes	No	No	No
Kawaii Koinu DS 2	MTO	MTO	October 9, 2008 (JP)	Yes	No	No	No
Kawaii Koinu DS 3	MTO	MTO	March 18, 2010 (JP)	Yes	No	No	No
Kawaii Koneko DS	MTO	MTO	January 24, 2008 (JP)	Yes	No	No	No
Kawaii Koneko DS 2	MTO	MTO	July 23, 2009 (JP)	Yes	No	No	No
Kawaii Koneko DS 3	MTO	MTO	December 2, 2010 (JP)	Yes	No	No	No
The Kayou Generation	Artoon	AQ Interactive	June 18, 2009 (JP)	Yes	No	No	No
Keiji J.B. Harold no Jikenbo: Manhattan Requiem & Kiss of Murder	althi Inc.	fonfun	November 27, 2008 (JP)	Yes	No	No	No
Keiji J.B. Harold no Jikenbo: Murder Club	althi Inc.	fonfun	February 21, 2008 (JP)	Yes	No	No	No
Keikishi Gunzou Presents: Monoshiri Bakumatsu-Ou	Global A	Global A	May 1, 2008 (JP)	Yes	No	No	No
Keitai Sousakan 7 DS: Buddy Sequence	5pb.	5pb.	March 26, 2009 (JP)	Yes	No	No	No
Kekkaishi: Karasumori Ayakashi Kidan	Bandai Namco Games	Bandai Namco Games	May 24, 2007 (JP)	Yes	No	No	No
Kekkaishi: Kokubourou Shuurai	Bandai Namco Games	Bandai Namco Games	March 20, 2008 (JP)	Yes	No	No	No
Keltis	Promotion Software	United Soft Media	July 6, 2009 (EU)	No	No	Yes	No
Kemeko Deluxe! DS: Yome to Meka to Otoko to Onna	5pb., Suzak	Genterprise	February 26, 2009 (JP)	Yes	No	No	No
Kenshūi Tendo Doctor	Spike	Spike	December 2, 2004 (JP)	Yes	No	No	No
Kero Kero 7	Amedio	Bandai	January 19, 2006 (JP)	Yes	No	No	No
Keroro Gunsou: Enshuu da Yo! Zenin Shuugou Part 2	Aspect	Bandai Namco Games	February 22, 2007 (JP)	Yes	No	No	No
Keroro RPG: Kishi to Musha to Densetsu no Kaizoku	7thChord	Bandai Namco Games	March 4, 2010 (JP)	Yes	No	No	No
Keshikasu-Kun: Battle Kas-tival	Inti Creates	Konami	July 15, 2010 (JP)	Yes	No	No	No
Ketsui Death Label	Cave	Arika	October 23, 2008 (JP)	Yes	No	No	No
Kid Paddle Blorks Invasion	Mistic Software	Atari SA	August 31, 2007 (EU)	No	No	Yes	No
Kid Paddle Lost in the Game	Mistic Software	Atari SA	October 1, 2008 (EU)	No	No	Yes	No
Kidou Gekidan Haro Ichiza Gundam Mahjong DS	Microvision	Bandai	December 29, 2005 (JP)	Yes	No	No	No
Kidou Gekidan Haro Ichiza: Gundam Mahjong + Z: Sara ni Deki Ruyouni Nattana!	Microvision	Bandai	September 6, 2007 (JP)	Yes	No	No	No
Kidou Senshi Gundam 00	Bandai Namco Games	Bandai Namco Games	March 27, 2008 (JP)	Yes	No	No	No
Kids Learn 2 Think: A+ Edition; THINK Kids: Ist doch logisch!^{DE}	Engine Software	Talking Stick Games	May 22, 2012 (NA)	No	Yes	Yes	No
Kids Learn Math: A+ Edition (Note: Primarily a mathematics-learning application, though it includes carnival-themed educational mini-games involving arithmetic, telling time and number recognition.)	Engine Software	Talking Stick Games	September 4, 2011 (NA)	No	Yes	No	No
Kids Learn Music: A+ Edition; Musik fuer Kids^{DE}	Engine Software	Talking Stick Games	September 4, 2011 (NA)	No	Yes	Yes	No
Kids Learn Spelling and Grammar: A+ Edition; GripsKids: Deutsch^{DE}	Engine Software	Talking Stick Games	March 2, 2012 (NA)	No	Yes	Yes	No
Kids thinkSMART; THINK Kids: Spiel dich schlau!^{DE} L'Entraîneur Cérébral: Kids^{FR}	Conspiracy Entertainment	Mentor Interactive	June 22, 2010 (NA)	No	Yes	Yes	No
Kikansha Thomas DS de Hajimeru Chiiku Gakushuu	Rocket Company	Rocket Company	July 24, 2008 (JP)	Yes	No	No	No
Kikansha Thomas: Kokugo Sansuu Eigo	Rocket Company	Rocket Company	August 2, 2007 (JP)	Yes	No	No	No
Kikiite Hajimaru: Eigo Kaiwa Training - KikiTore (Note: Primarily an English-conversation learning application, though it includes mini-games alongside conversational activities and songs.)	Benesse	Benesse	December 4, 2007 (JP)	Yes	No	No	No
Kiku! Kaku! Kotoba o Fuyasu! Hajimete no Eigo Training (Note: Primarily an English-learning application, though it includes more than ten stylus-controlled learning mini-games.)	Benesse	Benesse	June 28, 2007 (JP)	Yes	No	No	No
Kimi ni Todoke: Sodateru Omoi	Bandai Namco Games	Bandai Namco Games	October 15, 2009 (JP)	Yes	No	No	No
Kimi ni Todoke: Tsutaeru Kimochi	Bandai Namco Games	Bandai Namco Games	April 7, 2011 (JP)	Yes	No	No	No
Kimi no Yusha	SNK Playmore	SNK Playmore	October 23, 2008 (JP)	Yes	No	No	No
Kimokawae!	5pb.	5pb.	March 5, 2009 (JP)	Yes	No	No	No
Kindaichi Shounen no Jikenbou: Akuma no Satsujin Koukai	Tomcat System	Creative Core	September 17, 2009 (JP)	Yes	No	No	No
Kingdom Hearts 358/2 Days	h.a.n.d.	Square Enix	May 30, 2009 (JP)	Yes	Yes	Yes	No
Kingdom Hearts Re:coded	h.a.n.d.	Square Enix	October 7, 2010 (JP)	No	Yes	Yes	Yes
Kira Kira Pop Princess	Dimple Entertainment	505 Games, Dimple Entertainment, Shinsegae I&C	October 26, 2006 (JP)	Yes	Yes	Yes	No
Kirarin * Revolution: Atsumete Change! Kurikira * Code	Konami	Konami	December 20, 2008 (JP)	Yes	No	No	No
Kirarin * Revolution: Kira Kira Idol Audition	Konami	Konami	August 10, 2006 (JP)	Yes	No	No	No
Kirarin * Revolution: Mezase! Idol Queen	Konami	Konami	November 4, 2010 (JP)	Yes	No	No	No
Kirarin * Revolution: Minna de Odorou Furi Furi Debut!	Konami	Konami	July 24, 2008 (JP)	Yes	No	No	No
Kirarin * Revolution: Naasan to Issho	Konami	Konami	April 29, 2010 (JP)	Yes	No	No	No
Kirarin * Revolution: Tsukutte Misechao! Kime * Kira Stage	Konami	Konami	December 13, 2007 (JP)	Yes	No	No	No
Kirby Mass Attack	HAL Laboratory	Nintendo	August 4, 2011 (JP)	Yes	Yes	Yes	Yes
Kirby Super Star Ultra	HAL Laboratory	Nintendo	September 22, 2008 (NA)	Yes	Yes	Yes	Yes
Kirby: Canvas Curse	HAL Laboratory	Nintendo	March 24, 2005 (JP)	Yes	Yes	Yes	Yes
Kirby: Squeak Squad	Flagship, HAL Laboratory	Nintendo	November 2, 2006 (JP)	Yes	Yes	Yes	Yes
Kirei Zukin Seikatsu	Infinity	Columbia Music Entertainment	April 22, 2010 (JP)	Yes	No	No	No
Kirei Zukin Seikatsu 2	Infinity	Columbia Music Entertainment	April 28, 2011 (JP)	Yes	No	No	No
Kirikou and the Wild Beasts	Atari SA	Atari SA	2008 (PAL)	No	No	Yes	No
Knerten Gets Married	Ravn Studio	PAN Vision	October 14, 2010 (EU)	No	No	Yes	No
Knigge: Spielend zum guten Benehmen	Bright Future GmbH	Playtainment	July 17, 2009 (EU)	No	No	Yes	No
Knights in the Nightmare	Sting Entertainment	Atlus, Sting Entertainment	September 25, 2008 (JP)	Yes	Yes	No	No
Knock 'Em Downs: World's Fair	Guidance Interactive	Guidance Interactive	May 8, 2009 (NA)	No	Yes	No	No
Know How	Bitfield GmbH	cdv Software	October 30, 2008 (EU)	No	No	Yes	No
Know How 2	Bitfield GmbH	cdv Software	2010 (EU)	No	No	Yes	No
Kodawari Saihai Simulation: Ocha no Ma Pro Yakyuu DS	Now Production	Now Production	June 4, 2009 (JP)	Yes	No	No	No
Kodawari Saihai Simulation: Ocha no Ma Pro Yakyuu DS 2010 Nendohan	Now Production	Now Production	April 1, 2010 (JP)	Yes	No	No	No
Kodomo no Tame no Yomi Kikase: Ehon de Asobou 4-Kan (Note: Primarily an interactive picture-book application, though it includes a spot-the-difference mini-game alongside drawing and musical activities.)	Starfish	Starfish	October 19, 2006 (JP)	Yes	No	No	No
Kodomo no Tame no Yomi Kikase: Ehon de Asobou 6-Kan (Note: Primarily an interactive picture-book application, though it includes a sound-matching mini-game alongside drawing and musical activities.)	Starfish	Starfish	October 19, 2006 (JP)	Yes	No	No	No
Koh-Lanta: Survie Dans La Jungle!	Mindscape	Mindscape	October 9, 2009 (EU)	No	No	Yes	No
Koinu de Kururin	MTO	MTO	February 14, 2008 (JP)	Yes	No	No	No
Koisuru Purin! Koi wa Daibouken! Dr. Kanmi no Yabou!?	Tamsoft	Tryfirst	November 6, 2008 (JP)	Yes	No	No	No
Kokoro ga Uruou Birei Aquarium DS 2: Sekai no Uo to Ikura-Kujira Tachi	LightBee	Ertain	December 25, 2008 (JP)	Yes	No	No	No
Koma Neko DS	Suzak	Genterprise	July 24, 2008 (JP)	Yes	No	No	No
Konami Classics Series: Arcade Hits	Konami	Konami	March 15, 2007 (JP)	Yes	Yes	Yes	No
Konductra	oeFun	O3 Entertainment	October 31, 2006 (NA)	No	Yes	No	No
Kono Quiz Yarou!!	Namco	Namco	February 16, 2006 (JP)	Yes	No	No	No
Konzentration und Aufmerksamkeit 1.-4. Klasse	Franzis Verlag	Franzis Verlag	2010 (EU)	No	No	Yes	No
Kotoba no Puzzle: Mojipittan DS	Namco Bandai Games	Namco Bandai Games	March 15, 2007 (JP)	Yes	No	No	No
Kou Rate Ura Mahjong Retsuden Mukoubuchi: Goburei, Shuuryou desu ne	TamTam	Pi Arts	July 26, 2007 (JP)	Yes	No	No	No
Kouchuu Kakutou: Mushi 1 Grand Prix	Rocket Company	Rocket Company	November 24, 2005 (JP)	Yes	No	No	No
Kouchuu Ouja Mushi King: Greatest Champion e no Michi 2	Family Entertainment	Sega	July 27, 2006 (JP)	Yes	No	No	No
Kouchuu Ouja Mushi King: Greatest Champion e no Michi DS	Family Entertainment	Sega	December 8, 2005 (JP)	Yes	No	No	No
Kouchuu Ouja: Mushi King Super Collection	Family Entertainment	Sega	July 19, 2007 (JP)	Yes	No	No	No
Kouenji Joshi Soccer 2: Koi wa Nebagiba Kouenji	Starfish SD	Starfish SD	November 22, 2007 (JP)	Yes	No	No	No
Koukou Juken: Eitango Get Through 1900 - Eitan Zamurai DS	Good-Feel	Educational Network	October 11, 2007 (JP)	Yes	No	No	No
Koukou Yakyuu Dou DS	Spike	Spike	July 23, 2009 (JP)	Yes	No	No	No
The Koushounin	D3 Publisher	D3 Publisher	October 25, 2007 (JP)	Yes	No	No	No
Koushounin DS: The Negotiator	Polygon Magic	Alpha Unit	December 17, 2009 (JP)	Yes	No	No	No
Kousoku Card Battle: Card Hero	Intelligent Systems	Nintendo	December 20, 2007 (JP)	Yes	No	No	No
Kreuzwortraetsel DS: Welt Edition	The Game Company	The Game Company	2010 (EU)	No	No	Yes	No
Kumatanchi	Vanillaware	Dimple Entertainment	September 25, 2008 (JP)	Yes	No	No	No
Kung Fu Panda: Legendary Warriors	Artificial Mind and Movement	Activision	November 8, 2008 (NA)	No	Yes	Yes	Yes
Kunitori Zunou Battle: Nobunaga no Yabou	Koei	Koei	June 26, 2008 (JP)	Yes	No	No	No
Kupuu!! Mamegoma!	Creative Core	Creative Core	July 16, 2009 (JP)	Yes	No	No	No
Kurayami no Hate de Kimi o Matsu	WitchCraft	D3Publisher	October 22, 2009 (JP)	Yes	No	No	No
Kurikin Nano Island Story	MediaKite	Nintendo	May 24, 2007 (JP)	Yes	No	No	No
Kuroshitsuji: Phantom & Ghost	Square Enix	Square Enix	March 19, 2009 (JP)	Yes	No	No	No
Kurukuru * Princess: Tokimeki Figure * Mezase! Vancouver	Spike	Spike	December 10, 2009 (JP)	Yes	No	No	No
Kurupoto Cool Cool Stars	Starfish SD	Starfish SD, UFO Interactive Games	March 15, 2007 (NA)	Yes	Yes	No	No
Kururin Doughnuts: Okashi Recipe	Global A	Global A	July 5, 2007 (JP)	Yes	No	No	No
Kutsushita Nyanko: Kutsushita o Haita Neko to Kurashi Hajime Mashita	Infinity	D3Publisher	July 30, 2010 (JP)	Yes	No	No	No
Kuukan * Zukei: Hirameki Training - KuuTore	Good-Feel	Benesse	May 29, 2008 (JP)	Yes	No	No	No
Kuwagata Tsumami	Success	Success	July 24, 2008 (JP)	Yes	No	No	No
Kyouryuu Monster	MTO	MTO	September 20, 2007 (JP)	Yes	No	No	No
L the Prologue to Death Note –Rasen no Wana-	Konami	Konami	February 7, 2008 (JP)	Yes	No	No	No
L'Enigmistica	Pub Company s.r.l.	Pub Company s.r.l.	2009 (EU)	No	No	Yes	No
L'Histoire de France Pour Les Nuls	Anuman Interactive	Atari SA	October 14, 2008 (EU)	No	No	Yes	No
La Carte au Tresor	Mindscape	Mindscape	May 11, 2009 (EU)	No	No	Yes	No
La Culture Generale Pour Les Nuls Edition 2	Anuman Interactive	Atari AS	2009 (PAL)	No	No	Yes	No
Labyrinth	Lancarse	505 Games, Taito Corporation, UFO Interactive Games	December 1, 2005 (JP)	Yes	Yes	Yes	No
Lalaloopsy	Activision	Activision	November 6, 2011 (NA)	No	Yes	Yes	No
Lalaloopsy: Carnival of Friends	Activision	Activision	October 30, 2012 (NA)	No	Yes	Yes	No
Lanfeust of Troy	Tate Interactive	Atari SA	December 7, 2007 (EU)	No	No	Yes	No
Lapin Malin: J'apprends A Lire Et A Ecrire; Robbie Konijn: Leren lezen en schrijven^{NL}	Mindscape	Mindscape	June 20, 2008 (EU)	No	No	Yes	No
The Last Airbender	Halfbrick	THQ	June 29, 2010 (NA)	No	Yes	Yes	Yes
Last Bullet	FuRyu	FuRyu	April 23, 2009 (JP)	Yes	No	No	No
Last King of Africa	Focus Home Interactive	Focus Home Interactive	November 14, 2008 (EU)	No	No	Yes	No
Last Window: The Secret of Cape West	Cing	Nintendo	January 14, 2010 (JP)	Yes	No	Yes	No
Learn Chess	Dreamcatcher	Dreamcatcher	December 29, 2009 (NA)	No	Yes	Yes	No
Learn Geography	Dreamcatcher	Dreamcatcher	December 27, 2009 (NA)	No	Yes	Yes	No
Learn Math (Note: Primarily an educational application, though it includes unlockable bonus mini-games, including box-pushing puzzles, a match-three puzzle and an Arkanoid-style game.); Successfully Learning Mathematics^{EU} Lernerfolg Grundschule: Mathematik - Klasse 1-4^{DE} Lernerfolg Grundschule: Mathematik, Klasse 1+2^{DE} Lernerfolg Grundschule: Mathematik, Klasse 3+4^{DE}	Dreamcatcher	Dreamcatcher	December 22, 2008 (NA)	No	Yes	Yes	No
Learn Science	Dreamcatcher	Dreamcatcher	December 14, 2010 (NA)	No	Yes	Yes	No
Learn to Play Chess with Fritz and Chesster	Deep Silver	Deep Silver	February 6, 2009 (EU)	No	No	Yes	No
Learn with Pokémon: Typing Adventure	Genius Sonority	Nintendo	April 21, 2011 (JP)	Yes	No	Yes	Yes
Learning to Spell; I did it Mum! Spelling^{FR}	505 Games	505 Games	October 31, 2010 (NA)	No	Yes	Yes	No
Left Brain Right Brain	Japan Art Media	505 Games, Majesco	November 16, 2007 (EU)	No	Yes	Yes	No
Left Brain Right Brain 2	Kokolo Corporation	Majesco	December 9, 2008 (EU)	No	Yes	Yes	No
The Legend of Kage 2	Taito Corporation	Square Enix, Taito Corporation, Ubisoft	March 11, 2008 (JP)	Yes	Yes	Yes	No
Legend of Kay	JoWooD Productions	DreamCatcher Games	May 28, 2010 (EU)	No	Yes	Yes	Yes
The Legend of Spyro: A New Beginning	Amaze Entertainment	Sierra Entertainment	October 17, 2006 (NA)	No	Yes	Yes	No
The Legend of Spyro: Dawn of the Dragon	Tantalus Media	Sierra Entertainment	October 21, 2008 (NA)	No	Yes	Yes	No
The Legend of Spyro: The Eternal Night	The Fizz Factor	Sierra Entertainment	October 2, 2007 (NA)	No	Yes	Yes	No
Legend of the Guardians: The Owls of Ga'Hoole	Tantatus	Warner Bros. Interactive Entertainment	September 14, 2010 (NA)	No	Yes	Yes	Yes
The Legend of Zelda: Phantom Hourglass	Nintendo EAD	Nintendo	June 23, 2007 (JP)	Yes	Yes	Yes	Yes
The Legend of Zelda: Spirit Tracks	Nintendo EAD	Nintendo	December 7, 2009 (NA)	Yes	Yes	Yes	Yes
The Legendary Starfy	Tose	Nintendo	July 10, 2008 (JP)	Yes	Yes	No	Yes
Lego Batman 2: DC Super Heroes	Traveller's Tales	Warner Bros. Interactive Entertainment	June 19, 2012 (NA)	No	Yes	Yes	Yes
Lego Batman: The Video Game	TT Fusion	Warner Bros. Interactive Entertainment, DC Comics	September 23, 2008 (NA)	Yes	Yes	Yes	No
Lego Battles	Hellbent Games	Warner Bros. Interactive Entertainment	June 9, 2009 (NA)	No	Yes	Yes	No
Lego Battles: Ninjago	Hellbent Games, Traveller's Tales	Warner Bros. Interactive Entertainment	April 12, 2011 (NA)	No	Yes	Yes	Yes
Lego Friends	Hellbent Games	Warner Bros. Interactive Entertainment	April 8, 2014 (NA)	No	Yes	Yes	No
Lego Harry Potter: Years 1–4	TT Fusion	Warner Bros. Interactive Entertainment	November 11, 2010 (NA)	No	Yes	No	No
Lego Harry Potter: Years 5-7	TT Fusion	Warner Bros. Interactive Entertainment	November 11, 2011 (NA)	No	Yes	Yes	Yes
Lego Indiana Jones 2: The Adventure Continues	TT Fusion	LucasArts	November 17, 2009 (NA)	No	Yes	Yes	Yes
Lego Indiana Jones: The Original Adventures	TT Fusion	Activision, LucasArts	June 3, 2008 (NA)	No	Yes	Yes	Yes
Lego Legends of Chima: Laval's Journey	TT Fusion	Warner Bros. Interactive Entertainment	August 31, 2013 (NA)	No	Yes	Yes	No
Lego Marvel Super Heroes: Universe in Peril	TT Fusion	Warner Bros. Interactive Entertainment	February 18, 2014 (NA)	No	Yes	Yes	No
Lego Pirates of the Caribbean: The Video Game	Traveller's Tales	Disney Interactive Studios	May 10, 2011 (NA)	No	Yes	Yes	Yes
Lego Rock Band	Backbone Entertainment	Warner Bros. Interactive Entertainment	November 3, 2009 (NA)	No	Yes	Yes	Yes
Lego Star Wars II: The Original Trilogy	Amaze Entertainment	Electronic Arts, LucasArts	September 11, 2006 (PAL)	Yes	Yes	Yes	Yes
Lego Star Wars III: The Clone Wars	TT Fusion	LucasArts	March 22, 2011 (NA)	No	Yes	Yes	Yes
Lego Star Wars: The Complete Saga	TT Fusion	LucasArts	November 6, 2007 (NA)	No	Yes	Yes	Yes
Lego The Lord of the Rings	TT Fusion	Warner Bros. Interactive Entertainment	October 30, 2012 (NA)	No	Yes	Yes	Yes
Les aventures de T'choupi a l'ecole	Emme	Emme	July 20, 2010 (EU)	No	No	Yes	No
Les nouvelles aventures de T'choupi et ses amis	Emme	Emme	August 11, 2011 (EU)	No	No	Yes	No
Let's Draw! (Note: Primarily a drawing application, though it includes ten mini-games using the player's drawings, including Whack-a-Mole, Car Racing and Air Hockey.)	Agatsuma Entertainment	Majesco	April 3, 2008 (JP)	Yes	Yes	Yes	Yes
Let's Mangaka DS Style	Columbia Music Entertainment	Columbia Music Entertainment	July 29, 2010 (JP)	Yes	No	No	No
Let's Play Ballerina	Deep Silver	Deep Silver	June 18, 2010 (PAL)	No	Yes	Yes	No
Let's Play Fashion Designer	Deep Silver	Deep Silver	December 5, 2008 (PAL)	No	No	Yes	No
Let's Play Flight Attendant	Deep Silver	Deep Silver	May 25, 2010 (PAL)	No	Yes	Yes	No
Let's Play Garden	Deep Silver	Deep Silver	June 18, 2010 (PAL)	No	Yes	Yes	No
Let's Play Journalists	Deep Silver	Deep Silver	December 2, 2010 (PAL)	No	No	Yes	Yes
Let's Play Pet Hospitals	Biodroid Productions	Deep Silver	February 27, 2009 (PAL)	No	No	Yes	No
Let's Play Schools	ZigZag Island	Deep Silver	December 5, 2008 (PAL)	No	No	Yes	No
Let's Ride: Friends Forever	Independent Arts	THQ	March 3, 2008 (NA)	No	Yes	No	No
Lettriq	Vocabelum	Vocabelum	August 22, 2007 (EU)	No	No	Yes	No
LifeSigns: Surgical Unit	Spike	DreamCatcher Games, JoWooD Productions, Spike	October 21, 2005 (JP)	Yes	Yes	Yes	No
Lilpri DS: Hime-Chen! Apple Pink	Family Entertainment	Sega	December 19, 2010 (JP)	Yes	No	No	No
Lina no Atelier: Strahl no Renkinjutsushi	Gust	Gust	December 22, 2009 (JP)	Yes	No	No	No
Line Rider 2: Unbound	inXile Entertainment	Deep Silver, Genius Products	September 16, 2008 (NA)	No	Yes	Yes	No
Lingo	Media Sales & Licensing	Media Sales & Licensing	October 11, 2010 (EU)	No	No	Yes	No
Lingo Deluxe	Media Sales & Licensing	Media Sales & Licensing	December 26, 2011 (EU)	No	No	Yes	No
Lingo voor kinderen	Media Sales & Licensing	Media Sales & Licensing	December 17, 2011 (EU)	No	No	Yes	No
Lionel Trains: On Track	Black Lantern Studios	Destination Software	December 6, 2006 (NA)	No	Yes	Yes	No
Lise no Atelier: Ordre no Renkinjutsushi	Gust Co. Ltd.	Gust	April 19, 2007 (JP)	Yes	No	No	No
Little Bears	B-Alive	Zoo Games	April 2, 2009 (PAL)	No	Yes	Yes	No
Little Book of Big Secrets	505 Games	505 Games	April 23, 2010 (PAL)	No	No	Yes	No
Little Charley Bear	Avanquest Software	Avanquest Software	May 25, 2012 (PAL)	No	No	Yes	No
Little League World Series Baseball 2008	Activision	Activision	August 5, 2008 (NA)	No	Yes	No	No
Little League World Series Baseball 2009	Activision	Activision	June 23, 2009 (NA)	No	Yes	No	No
Little Red Riding Hood's Zombie BBQ	EnjoyUp Games	Destineer	October 28, 2008 (PAL,NA)	No	Yes	No	No
Little Wingels	KRITZELKRATZ 3000 GmbH	dtp Young Entertainment AG	September 3, 2009 (EU)	No	No	Yes	No
Littlest Pet Shop 3 Biggest Stars: Blue Team	Electronic Arts	Electronic Arts	October 5, 2010 (NA)	No	Yes	Yes	No
Littlest Pet Shop 3 Biggest Stars: Pink Team	Electronic Arts	Electronic Arts	October 5, 2010 (NA)	No	Yes	Yes	No
Littlest Pet Shop 3 Biggest Stars: Purple Team	Electronic Arts	Electronic Arts	October 5, 2010 (NA)	No	Yes	Yes	No
Littlest Pet Shop: Beach Friends	Electronic Arts	Electronic Arts	October 20, 2009 (NA)	No	Yes	Yes	No
Littlest Pet Shop: City Friends	Electronic Arts	Electronic Arts	October 20, 2009 (NA)	No	Yes	Yes	No
Littlest Pet Shop: Country Friends	Electronic Arts	Electronic Arts	October 20, 2009 (NA)	No	Yes	Yes	No
Littlest Pet Shop: Garden	Electronic Arts	Electronic Arts	October 14, 2008 (NA)	No	Yes	Yes	No
Littlest Pet Shop: Jungle	Electronic Arts	Electronic Arts	October 4, 2008 (NA)	No	Yes	Yes	No
Littlest Pet Shop: Spring	Electronic Arts	Electronic Arts	March 3, 2009 (NA)	No	Yes	Yes	No
Littlest Pet Shop: Winter	Electronic Arts	Electronic Arts	October 14, 2008 (NA)	No	Yes	Yes	No
Live Battle Card: Live-On DS	Acquire	Acquire	August 20, 2009 (JP)	Yes	No	No	No
Lively Garden	Brownie Brown	Marvelous Entertainment	January 28, 2010 (JP)	Yes	No	No	No
Lock's Quest	5th Cell	THQ	September 8, 2008 (NA)	Yes	Yes	Yes	No
Lode Runner	Hudson Soft	Hudson Soft	October 26, 2006 (JP)	Yes	No	No	No
Logic Cubes	Morgen Studios	Kiddinx	July 15, 2010 (EU)	No	No	Yes	No
Logic Machines	City Interactive	City Interactive	July 10, 2009 (EU)	No	Yes	Yes	No
LOL	Route24	Agetec, Rising Star Games, skip Ltd.	July 19, 2007 (JP)	Yes	Yes	Yes	No
Lola & Virginia	Imira Entertainment	Virgin Play (Spain); Warner Bros. Interactive Entertainment (European countries)	February 20, 2009 (EU)	No	No	Yes	No
Londonian Gothics: Mekyū no Lolita	Megacyber	Megacyber	October 13, 2005 (JP)	Yes	No	No	No
Looney Tunes: Cartoon Conductor	Amaze Entertainment	Eidos Interactive	June 6, 2008 (PAL)	No	Yes	Yes	No
Looney Tunes: Duck Amuck	WayForward Technologies	Warner Bros. Interactive Entertainment	October 9, 2007 (NA)	No	Yes	Yes	No
The Lord of the Rings: Aragorn's Quest	TT Fusion	Warner Bros. Interactive Entertainment	September 14, 2010 (NA)	No	Yes	Yes	Yes
The Lord of the Rings: Conquest	Artificial Mind and Movement	Electronic Arts	January 9, 2009 (PAL)	No	Yes	Yes	Yes
Los Lunnis	Legend Studios	505 Games	March 31, 2009 (EU)	No	No	Yes	No
Lost Identities	Engine Software	dtp Young Entertainment AG	October 15, 2010 (EU)	No	Yes	Yes	No
Lost in Blue	Konami	Konami	August 25, 2005 (JP)	Yes	Yes	Yes	No
Lost in Blue 2	Konami	Konami	March 15, 2007 (JP)	Yes	Yes	Yes	No
Lost in Blue 3	Konami	Konami	December 20, 2007 (JP)	Yes	Yes	Yes	No
The Lost Treasures of Alexandria	Engine Software	MSL	August 26, 2011 (PAL)	No	Yes	Yes	No
LostMagic	Taito Corporation	Taito Corporation, Ubisoft	January 19, 2006 (JP)	Yes	Yes	Yes	No
Love is... in Bloom: The Flower Shop Garden	Zoo Digital	Zoo Digital	April 9, 2009 (EU)	No	No	Yes	No
Love, Fashion and Friends: Element Girl; Girl Time^{JP}	Eidos Interactive	Eidos Interactive	November 14, 2008 (EU)	Yes	No	Yes	No
Lovely Lisa; Rika-Chan DS: Onna no Ko Lesson: Oshare mo Oshigoto mo Omakase!^{JP}	DreamFactory	Takara Tomy	November 29, 2007 (JP)	Yes	Yes	No	No
Lovely Lisa and Friends; Rika-Chan DS Motto! Onna no Ko Lesson: Oshare Oshigoto Otetsudai Daisuki!^{JP}	DreamFactory	Takara Tomy	November 5, 2009 (JP)	Yes	Yes	No	No
LovePlus	Konami	Konami	September 3, 2009 (JP)	Yes	No	No	No
LovePlus+	Konami	Konami	June 24, 2010 (JP)	Yes	No	No	No
Loving Life with Hello Kitty & Friends	Compile Heart	CokeM Interactive	June 17, 2011 (EU)	No	Yes	Yes	Yes
Lucky Luke: The Daltons	Neko Entertainment	Atari SA	September 25, 2008 (EU)	No	No	Yes	No
Lucky Star Moe Drill	Kadokawa Shoten	Kadokawa Shoten	December 1, 2005 (JP)	Yes	No	No	No
Lufia: Curse of the Sinistrals	Neverland	Square Enix	February 25, 2010 (JP)	Yes	Yes	No	No
Luminous Arc	Imageepoch	Atlus, Marvelous Entertainment, Rising Star Games	February 8, 2007 (JP)	Yes	Yes	Yes	No
Luminous Arc 2	Imageepoch	Atlus, Marvelous Entertainment	May 15, 2008 (JP)	Yes	Yes	Yes	No
Luminous Arc 3	Imageepoch	Marvelous Entertainment	December 10, 2009 (JP)	Yes	No	No	No
Lunar Knights	Kojima Productions	Konami	February 6, 2007 (NA)	Yes	Yes	Yes	No
Lunar: Dragon Song	Game Arts, Japan Art Media	Marvelous Entertainment, Rising Star Games, Ubisoft	August 25, 2005 (JP)	Yes	Yes	Yes	No
Lup Salad DS: Lupupu Cube	Dimple Entertainment	Dimple Entertainment	January 31, 2008 (JP)	Yes	No	No	No
Lupin Sansei: Shijou Saidai no Zunousen	Nex Entertainment	Namco Bandai Games	February 11, 2010 (JP)	Yes	No	No	No
Lux-Pain	Killaware	Ignition Entertainment, Marvelous Entertainment, Rising Star Games	March 27, 2008 (JP)	Yes	Yes	Yes	No
Luxor: Pharaoh's Challenge	Mac Play	MumboJumbo	December 18, 2007 (NA)	No	Yes	No	No
M&M's Adventure	Nikitova Games	Destination Software	November 21, 2008 (NA)	No	Yes	No	No
M&M's Break' Em	Destination Software	Destination Software, Zoo Digital Publishing	March 25, 2007 (NA)	No	Yes	Yes	No
M&M's Kart Racing	FrontLine Studios	Destination Software, Zoo Digital Publishing	March 24, 2008 (NA)	No	Yes	Yes	No
Mabeop Cheonjamun DS	Skonec	Nintendo of Korea	April 16, 2009 (KR)	Yes	No	No	No
Mabeop Cheonjamun DS 2: The Final Hanja Magic	Skonec	Nintendo of Korea	January 27, 2011 (KR)	Yes	No	No	No
Machi no Pet-Ya-San DS 2: Wannyan 333-Hiki Daishuugou!	Infinity	E-Frontier	February 19, 2009 (JP)	Yes	No	No	No
Machi no Pet-Ya-San DS: Wan-chan 200-Hiki Daishuugou	Infinity	E-Frontier	August 9, 2007 (JP)	Yes	No	No	No
Machi-Ing Maker DS	D3Publisher	D3Publisher	July 24, 2008 (JP)	Yes	No	No	No
Machiteba Tengoku! Makereba Jigoku! Ryoutsuryuu Ikkakusenkin Daisakusen!	Bandai Namco Games	Bandai Namco Games	June 17, 2010 (JP)	Yes	No	No	No
Madden NFL 06	EA Sports	EA Sports	August 8, 2005 (NA)	No	Yes	Yes	No
Madden NFL 07	Exient Entertainment	EA Sports	August 22, 2006 (NA)	No	Yes	Yes	No
Madden NFL 08	EA Tiburon	EA Sports	August 14, 2007 (NA)	No	Yes	Yes	No
Madden NFL 09	EA Tiburon	EA Sports	August 12, 2008 (NA)	No	Yes	Yes	No
Madden NFL 2005	EA Tiburon	EA Sports	November 17, 2004 (NA)	No	Yes	No	No
Maeh Jongg DS	Deep Silver	Deep Silver	2010 (EU)	No	No	Yes	No
Maejig Cheongkeuwa Mabeobui Seong	BarunsonCreative	BarunsonCreative	July 15, 2011 (KR)	Yes	No	No	No
Maestro! Jump in Music	Pasta Games	Bigben Interactive	November 30, 2009 (EU)	No	No	Yes	No
Mage Knight: Destiny's Soldier	Big Blue Bubble	Namco Bandai Games	September 26, 2006 (NA)	No	Yes	No	No
Magic Encyclopedia 3: Illusions	Engine Software	MSL	August 9, 2012 (EU)	No	No	Yes	No
Magic Encyclopedia II: Moonlight	Foreign Media	Foreign Media	October 14, 2010 (EU)	No	No	Yes	No
The Magic Roundabout	Neko Entertainment	Deep Silver	December 5, 2008 (EU)	No	No	Yes	No
The Magic School Bus: Oceans	Big Blue Bubble	Scholastic	October 25, 2011 (NA)	No	Yes	No	No
Magical Starsign	Brownie Brown	Nintendo	June 22, 2006 (JP)	Yes	Yes	Yes	No
Magical Zhu Zhu Princess: Carriages & Castles	Activision	Activision	February 8, 2011 (NA)	No	Yes	Yes	No
Magical Zunou Power!!	D3 Publisher	D3 Publisher	December 25, 2008 (JP)	Yes	No	No	No
Magician's Quest: Mysterious Times	Konami	Konami	November 13, 2008 (JP)	Yes	Yes	Yes	No
MagicQ DS	Studio9	Studio9	December 21, 2007 (KR)	Yes	No	No	No
Magnetica	Mitchell Corporation	Nintendo	March 2, 2006 (JP)	Yes	Yes	Yes	No
Mah Jong Quest: Expeditions	Game Brains	Activision, Global Software Publishing	October 16, 2007 (NA)	No	Yes	Yes	No
Mah-Jongg	Rising Star Games	Rising Star Games	2009 (EU)	No	No	Yes	No
Mahjong; Mahjongg	Kritzelkratz 3000	DTP Young Entertainment	June 15, 2007 (EU)	No	No	Yes	No
The Mahjong	D3 Publisher	D3 Publisher	June 30, 2005 (JP)	Yes	No	No	No
Mahjong 300	Cerasus Media	Avanquest Software	September 16, 2011 (EU)	No	No	Yes	No
Mahjong Haoh DS Special	Mainichi Communications	Mycom	December 21, 2006 (JP)	Yes	No	No	No
Mahjong Haoh DS: Dankyuu Battle	Mainichi Communications	Mycom	September 13, 2007 (JP)	Yes	No	No	No
Mahjong Journey: Quest for Tikal; Mahjongg: Ancient Mayas^{EU}	Cerasus Media	MumboJumbo	September 16, 2009 (EU)	No	Yes	Yes	No
Mahjong Kakutou Club DS: Wi-Fi Taiou	Konami	Konami	December 7, 2006 (JP)	Yes	No	No	No
Mahjong Mysteries: Ancient Athena	Cerasus Media	Avanquest Software	May 25, 2012 (EU)	No	No	Yes	No
Mahjong Mysteries: Ancient Egypt	Cerasus Media	Avanquest Software	June 25, 2010 (EU)	No	No	Yes	No
Mahjong Navi DS	Mainichi Communications	Mainichi Communications	May 15, 2008 (JP)	Yes	No	No	No
Mahjong Taikai	Koei	Koei	December 2, 2004 (JP)	Yes	No	No	No
Mahjong: Eine Reise um die Welt; Eindeloos Mahjong 2: Een Reis om de Wereld^{NL}	DTP Entertainment	DTP Entertainment	2008 (PAL)	No	No	Yes	No
Mainichi Suteki! Hello Kitty no Life Kit	Dorart	Dorart	September 13, 2007 (JP)	Yes	No	No	No
Maji de Manabu: LEC de Ukaru - DS Hishou Boki 3-Kyuu	Matrix Software	Square Enix	April 17, 2008 (JP)	Yes	No	No	No
Majime ni Fumajime Kaiketsu Zorori - Kyoufu no Takarabako	Japan Art Media	Marvelous Entertainment	August 31, 2006 (JP)	Yes	No	No	No
Majin Tantei Nōgami Neuro: Neuro to Miko no Bishoku Sanmai	Marvelous Entertainment	Marvelous Entertainment	June 12, 2008 (JP)	Yes	No	No	No
Major DS: Dream Baseball	Takara Tomy	Takara Tomy	July 31, 2008 (JP)	Yes	No	No	No
Major League Baseball 2K10	Powerhead Games	2K Sports	March 2, 2010 (NA)	No	Yes	No	No
Major League Baseball 2K11	Visual Concepts	2K Sports	March 8, 2011 (NA)	No	Yes	No	No
Major League Baseball 2K12	Visual Concepts	2K Sports	March 6, 2012 (NA)	No	Yes	No	No
Major League Baseball 2K7	Skyworks Technologies	2K Sports	March 19, 2007 (NA)	No	Yes	No	No
Major League Baseball 2K8 Fantasy All-Stars	Deep Fried Entertainment	2K Sports	April 14, 2008 (NA)	No	Yes	No	No
Major League Baseball 2K9 Fantasy All-Stars	Deep Fried Entertainment	2K Sports	March 3, 2009 (NA)	No	Yes	No	No
Make 10: A Journey of Numbers	MuuMuu	Nintendo	October 10, 2007 (JP)	Yes	No	Yes	Yes
Mame Goma 2: Uchi no Ko ga Ichiban!	Infinity	Creative Core	July 31, 2008 (JP)	Yes	No	No	No
Mame Goma 3: Kawaii ga Ippai	Infinity	Creative Core	August 5, 2010 (JP)	Yes	No	No	No
Mame Goma: Honobono Nikki	TDK Core	TDK Core	July 26, 2007 (JP)	Yes	No	No	No
Manga Ka Debut Monogatari DS: Akogare! Manga Ka Ikusei Game	Hyde	TDK Core	November 10, 2005 (JP)	Yes	No	No	No
MapleStory DS	Nexon	Nexon	April 15, 2010 (KR)	Yes	No	No	No
Mar Heaven: Boukyaku no Clavier	Alpha Unit	Konami	September 7, 2006 (JP)	Yes	No	No	No
Mar Heaven: Karudea no Akuma	Alpha Unit	Konami	March 30, 2006 (JP)	Yes	No	No	No
March of the Penguins	Destination Software	Destination Software, Zoo Digital Publishing	November 27, 2006 (NA)	No	Yes	Yes	No
Margot's Bepuzzled!	Zushi Games Ltd	Zushi Games Ltd	October 23, 2009 (NA)	No	Yes	Yes	No
Margot's Word Brain	Slam Games	Zoo Games	September 23, 2008 (NA)	No	Yes	Yes	No
Marie & Gully no Let's Science	Dorart	Dorart	April 15, 2010 (JP)	Yes	No	No	No
Marie-Antoinette et la Guerre d'Independence Americaine episode 1: La Fraternite du Loup	Nemopolis	Nemopolis	September 30, 2010 (EU)	No	No	Yes	No
Marie-Antoinette et les Disciples de Loki	Nemopolis	Nemopolis	December 14, 2011 (EU)	No	No	Yes	No
Mario & Luigi: Bowser's Inside Story	AlphaDream	Nintendo	February 11, 2009 (JP)	Yes	Yes	Yes	Yes
Mario & Luigi: Partners in Time	AlphaDream	Nintendo	November 28, 2005 (NA)	Yes	Yes	Yes	Yes
Mario & Sonic at the Olympic Games	Sega	Nintendo, Sega	January 17, 2008 (JP)	Yes	Yes	Yes	Yes
Mario & Sonic at the Olympic Winter Games	Sega	Nintendo, Sega	October 13, 2009 (NA)	Yes	Yes	Yes	Yes
Mario Hoops 3-on-3	Square Enix	Nintendo	July 27, 2006 (JP)	Yes	Yes	Yes	Yes
Mario Kart DS	Nintendo	Nintendo	November 14, 2005 (NA)	Yes	Yes	Yes	Yes
Mario Party DS	Hudson Soft	Nintendo	November 8, 2007 (JP)	Yes	Yes	Yes	Yes
Mario vs. Donkey Kong 2: March of the Minis	Nintendo	Nintendo	September 25, 2006 (NA)	Yes	Yes	Yes	Yes
Mario vs. Donkey Kong: Mini-Land Mayhem!	Nintendo Software Technology	Nintendo	November 14, 2010 (NA)	Yes	Yes	Yes	Yes
Marker Man Adventures	Glyphic Entertainment	Majesco	August 18, 2009 (NA)	No	Yes	No	No
Martin Mystery	OUAT Entertainment	Ubisoft	August 18, 2008 (EU)	No	No	Yes	No
Marvel Nemesis: Rise of the Imperfects	EA Canada, Sensory Sweep Studios	EA Games	October 11, 2005 (NA)	No	Yes	Yes	No
Marvel Super Hero Squad	Halfbrick	THQ	October 20, 2009 (NA)	No	Yes	Yes	Yes
Marvel Super Hero Squad: The Infinity Gauntlet	Griptonite Games	THQ	November 16, 2010 (NA)	No	Yes	Yes	Yes
Marvel Trading Card Game	1st Playable Productions	Konami	May 22, 2007 (NA)	No	Yes	Yes	No
Marvel: Ultimate Alliance 2	Vicarious Visions	Activision	September 15, 2009 (NA)	No	Yes	Yes	Yes
Master Jin Jin's IQ Challenge	Astroll	Valcon Games	September 1, 2006 (JP)	Yes	Yes	Yes	Yes
Master of Illusion (Note: Primarily a magic-trick demonstration and teaching application, though it includes mini-games in its Magic Training mode, including card games and mirror-image drawing challenges.)	8ing, Tenyo	Nintendo	November 16, 2006 (JP)	Yes	Yes	Yes	No
Master of the Monster Lair	Global A Entertainment	Atlus, Global A Entertainment, Rising Star Games	October 25, 2007 (JP)	Yes	Yes	Yes	No
Match 3 Madness	Most Wanted Entertainment	Foreign Media	November 30, 2010 (PAL)	Yes	No	Yes	No
Matchstick Puzzle by DS	Ertain	Ertain, DreamCatcher Games	February 11, 2008 (PAL)	No	Yes	Yes	No
Math Blaster in the Prime Adventure	Knowledge Adventure	Knowledge Adventure	February 3, 2008 (NA)	No	Yes	No	No
Math Play	Denyu-Sha	Denyu-Sha, Natsume Inc., Ubisoft	September 7, 2006 (JP)	Yes	Yes	Yes	No
Maths Buddy Class 5	Deep Silver	Deep Silver	2010 (PAL)	No	No	Yes	No
Maths Buddy Class 6	Deep Silver	Deep Silver	2010 (PAL)	No	No	Yes	No
Maus DS	Braingame	Braingame	December 12, 2008 (PAL)	Yes	No	Yes	No
Max and the Magic Marker	Most Wanted Entertainment	Easy Interactive	July 30, 2011 (PAL)	No	Yes	Yes	No
May's Mystery: Forbidden Memories	V5 Play Studio	Mastertronic	August 12, 2011 (PAL)	No	Yes	Yes	No
Maya; Maja^{DE}	Studio 100 NV	Studio 100 NV	July 13, 2013 (EU)	No	No	Yes	No
Mazes of Fate DS	Sabarasa	Graffiti Entertainment	September 9, 2008 (NA)	No	Yes	No	No
Meccha! Taiko no Tatsujin DS: Nanatsu no Shima no Daibouken	Namco Bandai Games	Namco Bandai Games	April 24, 2008 (JP)	Yes	No	No	No
Mechanic Master	Midway Games	Midway Games	October 24, 2008 (PAL)	No	Yes	Yes	No
Mechanic Master 2	Midway Games	Midway Games	October 20, 2010 (NA)	No	Yes	Yes	No
MechAssault: Phantom War	Backbone Entertainment	Eidos Interactive, Majesco	September 12, 2006 (NA)	No	Yes	Yes	No
Medarot DS: Kabuto Ver.	Delta Arts	Rocket Company	May 27, 2010 (JP)	Yes	No	No	No
Medarot DS: Kuwagata Ver.	Delta Arts	Rocket Company	May 27, 2010 (JP)	Yes	No	No	No
Mega Bloks: Diego's Build and Rescue	2K Play	Take-Two Interactive	October 26, 2010 (NA)	No	Yes	Yes	No
Mega Man Battle Network 5: Double Team DS	Capcom	Capcom, Nintendo	July 21, 2005 (JP)	Yes	Yes	Yes	Yes
Mega Man Star Force 2: Zerker × Ninja	Capcom	Capcom	November 22, 2007 (JP)	Yes	Yes	Yes	Yes
Mega Man Star Force 2: Zerker × Saurian	Capcom	Capcom	November 22, 2007 (JP)	Yes	Yes	Yes	Yes
Mega Man Star Force 3: Black Ace	Capcom	Capcom	November 13, 2008 (JP)	Yes	Yes	No	No
Mega Man Star Force 3: Red Joker	Capcom	Capcom	November 13, 2008 (JP)	Yes	Yes	No	No
Mega Man Star Force: Dragon	Capcom	Capcom	December 14, 2006 (JP)	Yes	Yes	Yes	Yes
Mega Man Star Force: Leo	Capcom	Capcom	December 14, 2006 (JP)	Yes	Yes	Yes	Yes
Mega Man Star Force: Pegasus	Capcom	Capcom	December 14, 2006 (JP)	Yes	Yes	Yes	Yes
Mega Man Zero Collection	Inti Creates	Capcom	June 8, 2010 (NA)	Yes	Yes	Yes	No
Mega Man ZX	Inti Creates	Capcom	July 6, 2006 (JP)	Yes	Yes	Yes	No
Mega Man ZX Advent	Inti Creates	Capcom	July 12, 2007 (JP)	Yes	Yes	Yes	No
Mega Mindy	ThePharmacy	Studio 100 NV	2009 (EU)	No	No	Yes	No
Mehr Kreuzwortraetsel	Deep Silver	Deep Silver	2010 (EU)	No	No	Yes	No
Mein Beautyhotel fur Tiere	exozet	dtp Young Entertainment AG	2008 (EU)	No	No	Yes	No
Mein TraumJob Kinderarztin	Aruba Games	Tivola	September 25, 2009 (EU)	No	No	Yes	No
Meitantei Conan & Kindaichi Shounen no Jikenbou	Namco Bandai Games	Namco Bandai Games	February 5, 2009 (JP)	Yes	No	No	No
Meitantei Conan: Aoki Houseki no Rinbukyoku	Namco Bandai Games	Namco Bandai Games	April 21, 2011 (JP)	Yes	No	No	No
Meitantei Conan: Kakokara no Zensou Kyoku	Namco Bandai Games	Namco Bandai Games	April 19, 2012 (JP)	Yes	No	No	No
Meitantei Conan: Kieta Hakase to Machigai Sagashi no Tou	Namco Bandai Games	Namco Bandai Games	April 3, 2008 (JP)	Yes	No	No	No
Meitantei Conan: Tantei Ryoku Trainer	Namco Bandai Games	Namco Bandai Games	February 5, 2009 (JP)	Yes	No	No	No
Mensch argere Dich nicht	Independent Arts	Kiddinx	September 17, 2009 (EU)	No	No	Yes	No
Merlin: A Servant of Two Masters	Avanquest Software	Avanquest Software	October 26, 2012 (EU)	No	No	Yes	No
Metal Fight Beyblade DS	Amber	Hudson Soft	March 26, 2009 (JP)	Yes	No	No	No
Metal Fight Beyblade: Choujou Kessen! Big Bang Bladers	Amble	Hudson Soft	December 2, 2010 (JP)	Yes	No	No	No
Metal Max 2: Reloaded	Crea-Tech	Kadokawa Games	December 8, 2011 (JP)	Yes	No	No	No
Metal Max 3	Enterbrain	Kadokawa Games	July 29, 2010 (JP)	Yes	No	No	No
Metal Saga: Hagane no Kisetsu	Crea-Tech	Success Corporation	June 15, 2006 (JP)	Yes	No	No	No
Metal Slug 7	SNK Playmore	SNK Playmore, Ignition Entertainment	July 17, 2008 (JP)	Yes	Yes	Yes	No
Meteos	Q Entertainment, Sora Ltd.	Bandai, Nintendo	March 10, 2005 (JP)	Yes	Yes	Yes	Yes
Meteos: Disney Magic	Q Entertainment, Aspect Co., Ltd., Platinum Egg	Buena Vista Games	February 20, 2007 (NA)	Yes	Yes	Yes	No
Metroid Prime Hunters	Nintendo Software Technology, Retro Studios	Nintendo	March 20, 2006 (NA)	Yes	Yes	Yes	No
Metroid Prime Pinball	Fuse Games	Nintendo	October 24, 2005 (NA)	Yes	Yes	Yes	No
Metropolis Crimes	Lexis Numerique	Ubisoft	October 1, 2009 (EU)	No	No	Yes	No
Mezase! Koushien	Tasuke	Tasuke	July 24, 2008 (EU)	No	No	Yes	No
Mezase!! Tsuri Master DS	Hudson Soft	Hudson Soft	April 23, 2009 (EU)	No	No	Yes	No
Mi Experto en Aleman: Mejora tu Vocabulario Aleman	Ubisoft	Ubisoft	2009 (PAL)	No	No	Yes	No
Miami Law	Hudson Soft	Hudson Soft	June 9, 2009 (NA)	Yes	Yes	No	No
Miami Nights: Singles in the City	Gameloft	Ubisoft	January 15, 2008 (NA)	No	Yes	Yes	No
Michael Jackson: The Experience	Ubisoft	Ubisoft	November 23, 2010 (NA)	Yes	Yes	Yes	Yes
Micro Machines V4	Supersonic Software	Codemasters	January 5, 2007 (PAL)	No	Yes	Yes	No
Midnight Mysteries: The Edgar Allan Poe Conspiracy	MumboJumbo	MumboJumbo	September 21, 2010 (NA)	No	Yes	Yes	No
Midnight Play! Pack	Gameloft	Ubisoft	June 6, 2008 (PAL)	No	Yes	Yes	No
Miffy's World	PAN Vision	PAN Vision	2010 (PAL)	No	No	Yes	No
Might & Magic: Clash of Heroes	Capybara Games	Ubisoft	December 1, 2009 (NA)	No	Yes	Yes	No
Military History: Commander - Europe at War	Slitherine	Koch Media	March 20, 2009 (EU)	No	No	Yes	No
Milon no Hoshizora Shabon: Puzzle Kumikyoku	Takumi Corporation	Hudson Soft	July 6, 2006 (JP)	Yes	No	No	No
Mimi de Unou o Kitaeru DS: Chou-Nouryoku	MileStone Inc.	MileStone Inc.	July 26, 2007 (JP)	Yes	No	No	No
Mimi's Party Fun!	TechFront	Destineer	September 30, 2010 (NA)	No	No	Yes	No
Mind Body & Soul: Big Word Puzzle Book	1bit garden	505 Games	April 24, 2009 (EU)	No	No	Yes	No
Mind Body & Soul: Blend-it	Crush Digital	505 Games	March 26, 2010 (EU)	No	No	Yes	No
Mind Quiz: Your Brain Coach	Ubisoft	Sega, Ubisoft	September 14, 2006 (JP)	Yes	Yes	Yes	No
Mind Your Language: English	Spiral House	Virgin Play	February 13, 2009 (EU)	No	No	Yes	No
Mind Your Language: French	Spiral House	Virgin Play	February 13, 2009 (EU)	No	No	Yes	No
Mind Your Language: German	Spiral House	Virgin Play	February 13, 2009 (EU)	No	No	Yes	No
Mind Your Language: Japanese	Spiral House	Virgin Play	February 13, 2009 (EU)	No	No	Yes	No
Mind Your Language: Spanish	Spiral House	Virgin Play	February 13, 2009 (EU)	No	No	Yes	No
MinDStorm 2	ASK	505 Games; ASK	February 19, 2009 (JP)	Yes	No	Yes	No
Mini Golf Resort	Teyon	S.A.D.	January 7, 2011 (EU)	No	No	Yes	No
Mini Ninjas	IO Interactive	Eidos Interactive	September 8, 2009 (NA)	No	Yes	Yes	Yes
Mini RC Rally	Summitsoft Entertainment	Summitsoft Entertainment	December 12, 2006 (NA)	No	Yes	No	No
Mini Yonkyu DS	Rocket Company	Rocket Company	December 17, 2009 (JP)	Yes	No	No	No
Minna Atsumare! Quiz Party	Ertain	Ertain	March 27, 2008 (JP)	Yes	No	No	No
Minna de Flash Anzan DS	MileStone Inc.	MileStone Inc.	March 27, 2008 (JP)	Yes	No	No	No
Minna no Conveni	Japan Art Media	Taito Corporation	February 10, 2010 (JP)	Yes	No	No	No
Minna no Doubutsuen	Jupiter Corporation	Taito Corporation	April 30, 2009 (JP)	Yes	No	No	No
Minna no DS Seminar: Kanpeki Eitango Ryoku (Note: Primarily an English-vocabulary learning application, though it includes word puzzle games and a fantasy adventure mode.)	TDK Core	TDK Core	July 20, 2006 (JP)	Yes	No	No	No
Minna no DS Seminar: Kanpeki Kanji Ryoku (Note: Primarily a kanji-learning application, though it includes kanji puzzle games and a historical adventure mode.)	TDK Core	TDK Core	July 20, 2006 (JP)	Yes	No	No	No
Minna no Mahjong: Kenkou Mahjong DS	MTO	MTO	April 28, 2005 (JP)	Yes	No	No	No
Minna no Oekakiyasan	Climax Entertainment	Taito Corporation	July 2, 2009 (JP)	Yes	No	No	No
Minna no Suizokukan	Jupiter Corporation	Taito Corporation	March 25, 2010 (JP)	Yes	No	No	No
Minna to Kimi no Piramekino!	Infinity	Bandai Namco Games	November 25, 2010 (JP)	Yes	No	No	No
Minute to Win It	Smack Down Productions	Zoo Games	November 2, 2010 (NA)	No	Yes	No	No
Mirakuru! Mimika DS	Culture Brain	Culture Brain	January 22, 2009 (JP)	Yes	No	No	No
Miss Princess: MisPri!	Koei Tecmo Games	Koei Tecmo Games	November 17, 2011 (JP)	Yes	No	No	No
Miss Spider's Sunny Patch Friends: Harvest Time Hop and Fly	Shin'en Multimedia	The Game Factory	May 30, 2006 (NA)	No	Yes	Yes	No
The Misshitsukara no Dasshutsu	Intense	D3Publisher	November 29, 2007 (JP)	Yes	No	No	No
The Misshitsukara no Dasshutsu 2	Intense	D3Publisher	November 27, 2008 (JP)	Yes	No	No	No
Mission: Runway	Independent Arts	THQ	March 18, 2008 (NA)	No	Yes	No	No
Mister Slime	Lexis Numerique	SouthPeak Games; DTP Entertainment	July 17, 2008 (NA)	No	Yes	Yes	No
Mite wa Ikenai	Studio Trico	Dimple Entertainment	August 7, 2008 (JP)	Yes	No	No	No
Mitsukete! Keroro Gunsou	Bandai Namco Games	Bandai Namco Games	September 27, 2007 (JP)	Yes	No	No	No
Miyamoto Sansuu Kyoushitsu no Kyouzai: Kashikoku naru Puzzle DS Ban	Gakken	Gakken	February 14, 2008 (JP)	Yes	No	No	No
Mizuiro Blood	Crafts & Meister	Bandai Namco Games	June 14, 2007 (JP)	Yes	No	No	No
MLB Power Pros 2008	Konami	2K Sports	August 25, 2008 (NA)	No	Yes	No	No
Moe Moe 2-Ji Daisenryaku 2: Yamato Nadesico	SystemSoft	SystemSoft	March 18, 2010 (JP)	Yes	No	No	No
Moero! Nekketsu Rhythm Damashii Osu! Tatakae! Ouendan 2	iNiS	Nintendo	May 17, 2007 (JP)	Yes	No	No	No
Moesta: Moeru Toudai Eigojuku	Noise Factory	Mirai Shounen	July 31, 2008 (JP)	Yes	No	No	No
Moetan DS	Idea Factory	Idea Factory	July 24, 2008 (JP)	Yes	No	No	No
Mommy Talk DS	Intelligent Design	Intelligent Design	July 1, 2010 (JP)	Yes	No	No	No
Momotarou Dentetsu DS	Hudson Soft	Hudson Soft	April 26, 2007 (JP)	Yes	No	No	No
Momotarou Dentetsu World	Hudson Soft	Hudson Soft	December 2, 2010 (JP)	Yes	No	No	No
Momotarou Dentetsu: 20-Shuunen	Hudson Soft	Hudson Soft	December 18, 2008 (JP)	Yes	No	No	No
Mon Coach Personnel: J'ameliore mon Anglais; Mi Experto en Ingles: Mejora Tu Vocabulario Ingles^{ESP} Il Mio Coach - Arricchisco il mio Inglese^{IT} Mein Wortschatz-Coach - Englisch Lernen^{DE}	Ubisoft	Ubisoft	June 26, 2009 (EU)	No	No	Yes	No
Mon Premier Bescherelle	Anuman Interactive	Atari SA	June 26, 2009 (EU)	No	No	Yes	No
Monkey Madness: Island Escape	7Raven Studios	Storm City Games	March 23, 2009 (NA)	No	Yes	No	No
Monochrome Boo & Baby Boo: Kururin Boo	Success	Creative Core	December 10, 2009 (JP)	Yes	No	No	No
Monopoly	Venan Entertainment	Electronic Arts	October 26, 2010 (NA)	No	Yes	Yes	Yes
Monopoly / Boggle / Yahtzee / Battleship	Sensory Sweep Studios	Atari	December 13, 2005 (NA)	No	Yes	Yes	Yes
Monoshiri Sengoku Ou	Global A	Global A	November 29, 2007 (JP)	Yes	No	No	No
Monster Band; Music Monstars^{EU}	Novarama	Dreamcatcher	March 2, 2009 (NA)	No	Yes	Yes	No
Monster Bomber	Taito Corporation	Taito Corporation, Majesco, 505 Games, Red Ant Enterprises	March 23, 2006 (JP)	Yes	Yes	Yes	Yes
Monster Frenzy	Bluestone Interactive	Zoo Games	May 25, 2010 (NA)	No	Yes	No	No
Monster High: 13 Wishes	Torus Games	Little Orbit	October 29, 2013 (NA)	No	Yes	Yes	Yes
Monster High: Ghoul Spirit	ImaginEngine	THQ	October 25, 2011 (NA)	No	Yes	Yes	Yes
Monster High: Skultimate Roller Maze	Game Machine Studios	Little Orbit	November 13, 2012 (NA)	No	Yes	Yes	Yes
Monster House	Artificial Mind and Movement	THQ	July 18, 2006 (NA)	Yes	Yes	Yes	No
Monster Jam	Torus Games	Activision	November 13, 2007 (NA)	No	Yes	Yes	No
Monster Jam: Path of Destruction	Torus Games	Activision	November 9, 2010 (NA)	No	Yes	Yes	No
Monster Jam: Urban Assault	Torus Games	Activision	October 28, 2008 (NA)	No	Yes	Yes	No
Monster Lab	Backbone Entertainment	Eidos Interactive	October 31, 2008 (PAL)	No	Yes	Yes	No
Monster Mayhem: Build and Battle	Brain Toys	Crave	August 11, 2009 (NA)	No	Yes	No	No
Monster Puzzle; Soroeru Puzzle Douwa Oukoku^{JP}	Success	Success	April 20, 2006 (JP)	Yes	No	Yes	No
Monster Racers	Koei	Koei	January 22, 2009 (JP)	Yes	Yes	No	No
Monster Rancher DS	Tecmo	Tecmo	August 7, 2008 (JP)	Yes	Yes	No	No
Monster Tale	DreamRift	Majesco	March 22, 2011 (NA)	No	Yes	No	No
Monster Trucks DS	Skyworks Technologies	Majesco, THQ	December 11, 2005 (NA)	No	Yes	Yes	No
Monsters vs. Aliens	Activision	Activision	March 24, 2009 (NA)	No	Yes	Yes	No
Montessori Music	Will	Creative Core	April 24, 2008 (JP)	Yes	No	Yes	No
Moomin Tani no Okurimono	Sonic Powered	Sonic Powered	November 19, 2009 (JP)	Yes	No	No	No
Moon	Renegade Kid	Gamebridge, Mastiff	January 13, 2009 (NA)	No	Yes	Yes	No
Moorhuhn DS	Sproing	Phenomedia	December 28, 2007 (PAL)	No	No	Yes	No
Moorhuhn Jahrmarkt Party	VIS-Games	DTP Entertainment	July 13, 2007 (PAL)	No	No	Yes	No
Moorhuhn: Jewel of Darkness	Phenomedia	MumboJumbo	March 20, 2008 (PAL)	No	No	Yes	No
More Successful Learning: Maths	Dreamcatcher	Dreamcatcher	2008 (PAL)	No	No	Yes	No
Mori no Cafeteria DS: Oshare na Cafe Recipe	Aspect	D3Publisher	December 4, 2008 (JP)	Yes	No	No	No
Morinaga Takurou no Okane no Shin Joushiki DS Training	Route24	KK Best Sellers	October 23, 2008 (JP)	Yes	No	No	No
Moshi Monsters: Katsuma Unleashed	Black Lantern Studios	Activision	October 11, 2013 (EU)	No	Yes	Yes	Yes
Moshi Monsters: Moshling Zoo	Mind Candy	Activision	November 6, 2011 (NA)	No	Yes	Yes	Yes
Moshi Monsters: Moshlings Theme Park	Black Lantern Studios	Activision	October 26, 2012 (EU)	No	Yes	Yes	Yes
Moshimo!? Kinen Surunara...	Takara Tomy	Takara Tomy	November 27, 2008 (JP)	Yes	No	No	No
Moshimo!? Saibanin ni Eribaretara...	Takara Tomy	Takara Tomy	November 27, 2008 (JP)	Yes	No	No	No
Moto Racer DS	Artefacts	Nobilis	November 28, 2008 (EU)	No	Yes	Yes	No
Mots Croises	Bigben Interactive	Neko Entertainment	September 19, 2007 (EU)	No	No	Yes	No
Mots Croises 2	Bigben Interactive	Neko Entertainment	April 22, 2008 (EU)	No	No	Yes	No
Motto Hayaku! Seikaku Ni! Suu Sense Keisan Ryuoku Up Training - SuuTore	Benesse	Benesse	December 4, 2008 (JP)	Yes	No	No	No
Motto! Hamster to Kurasou: Akachan ga Umareta yo	Interchannel	Interchannel	September 17, 2009 (JP)	Yes	No	No	No
Motto! Stitch! DS Rhythm de Rakugaki Daisakusen	Cattle Call	Disney Interactive Studios	November 18, 2010 (JP)	Yes	No	No	No
Mouichido Tsuueru - The Otona no Shougakkou	Affect	D3Publisher	December 7, 2006 (JP)	Yes	No	No	No
Moyashimon DS	Takara Tomy	Takara Tomy	July 23, 2009 (JP)	Yes	No	No	No
Mr. Bean	Blast! Entertainment	Blast! Entertainment	March 14, 2008 (PAL)	No	No	Yes	Yes
Mr. Driller Drill Spirits	Namco	Namco, Nintendo	November 30, 2004 (NA)	Yes	Yes	Yes	No
MTV Fan Attack	Le Caillou	Mindscape	November 22, 2007 (PAL)	No	No	Yes	No
The Mummy: Tomb of the Dragon Emperor	Artificial Mind and Movement	Sierra Entertainment	July 22, 2008 (NA)	No	Yes	Yes	No
Murder in Venice	City Interactive	City Interactive	May 16, 2011 (NA)	No	Yes	Yes	No
Murder on the Titanic	Easy Interactive	Easy Interactive	May 3, 2012 (NA)	No	Yes	Yes	No
Mushi: Machi no Konchuu Monogatari	Marionette	Taito Corporation	August 3, 2006 (JP)	Yes	No	No	No
Mushishi: Amefuru Sato	Tenky	Marvelous Entertainment	January 31, 2008 (JP)	Yes	No	No	No
The Mushitori Oukoku	D3 Publisher	505 Game Street, D3 Publisher	June 30, 2005 (JP)	Yes	No	Yes	No
Mushroom Men: Rise of the Fungi	Red Fly Studio	Gamecock Media Group	October 11, 2008 (PAL)	No	Yes	Yes	No
MX vs. ATV: Reflex	Tantalus Media	THQ	December 1, 2009 (NA)	No	Yes	Yes	No
MX vs. ATV: Untamed	Tantalus Media	THQ	December 17, 2007 (NA)	No	Yes	Yes	No
My Amusement Park	Scholastic, Inc.	Scholastic, Inc.	October 26, 2010 (NA)	No	Yes	No	Yes
My Animal Centre	Braingame	Deep Silver	December 5, 2008 (PAL)	No	No	Yes	No
My Animal Centre in Africa; Pawly Pets: My Animal Centre in Africa	Europress	505 Game Street, Europress	November 23, 2007 (PAL)	No	No	Yes	Yes
My Baby 3 & Friends	Dancing Dots	Nobilis, Majesco	October 12, 2010 (NA)	No	Yes	Yes	No
My Baby Boy	Dancing Dots	Nobilis, SouthPeak Games	October 28, 2008 (NA)	No	Yes	Yes	No
My Baby First Steps	Dancing Dots	Nobilis, SouthPeak Games	November 11, 2009 (NA)	No	Yes	Yes	No
My Baby Girl	Dancing Dots	Nobilis, SouthPeak Games	November 4, 2008 (NA)	No	Yes	Yes	No
My Ballet Studio; Diva Girls: Diva Ballerina^{EU}	505 Games	505 Games	November 17, 2009 (NA)	No	Yes	Yes	No
My Boyfriend (2008)	dtp Young Entertainment AG	dtp Young Entertainment AG	2008 (EU)	No	No	Yes	No
My Boyfriend (2009); Real Stories: Amoureux pour la Vie^{FR} My Boyfriend: Der Sommer Meines Lebens^{DE}	Engine Software	THQ, Mindscape	September 14, 2009 (NA)	No	Yes	Yes	No
My Boyfriend: Verliebt in einen Star	exozet	dtp Young Entertainment AG	August 5, 2009 (EU)	No	No	Yes	No
My Chinese Coach	Ubisoft	Ubisoft	August 26, 2008 (NA)	No	Yes	Yes	No
My DoItAll	Rocket Studio	Tomy Corporation	February 10, 2010 (NA)	No	Yes	No	No
My English Coach	Ubisoft	Ubisoft	2009 (PAL)	No	No	Yes	No
My English Coach: Para Hispanoparlantes	Ubisoft	Ubisoft	March 10, 2009 (NA)	No	Yes	No	No
My Farm Around the World	BIP Games	Atari SA	November 14, 2008 (EU)	No	Yes	Yes	No
My Fashion Studio; Fashion Designer: Style Icon^{EU}	505 Games	Ubisoft	June 10, 2008 (NA)	No	Yes	Yes	No
My First Dollhouse	505 Games	505 Games	September 25, 2009 (EU)	No	Yes	Yes	No
My French Coach	Ubisoft	Ubisoft	November 6, 2007 (NA)	No	Yes	Yes	No
My French Coach Level 2: Intermediate	Ubisoft	Ubisoft	November 23, 2007 (PAL)	No	No	Yes	No
My Friends	Oxygen Interactive	Oxygen Interactive	July 31, 2009 (EU)	No	Yes	Yes	No
My Frogger Toy Trials	Konami	Konami	November 13, 2006 (NA)	No	Yes	No	No
My Hero: Doctor	Majesco	Majesco	November 17, 2009 (NA)	No	Yes	Yes	No
My Hero: Firefighter; Let's Play Firemen^{EU}	Deep Silver	Deep Silver	February 27, 2009 (PAL)	No	No	Yes	No
My Horse & Me 2: Riding for Gold	Tate Interactive	Atari	November 21, 2008 (PAL)	No	Yes	Yes	Yes
My Horse and Me	W!Games	Atari	November 23, 2007 (PAL)	No	Yes	Yes	No
My Japanese Coach	Ubisoft	Ubisoft	September 23, 2008 (NA)	No	Yes	Yes	No
My Little Pony: Pinkie Pie's Party	Webfoot Technologies	THQ	September 22, 2008 (NA)	No	Yes	Yes	No
My Melody Angel Book: Denshi Techou & Enjoy Game	TDK Core	TDK Core	March 29, 2007 (JP)	Yes	No	No	No
My Pet Chimp	505 Games	505 Games	March 23, 2010 (NA)	No	Yes	No	No
My Pet Dolphin	Starfish SD	Starfish SD, 505 Games	September 13, 2007 (JP)	Yes	No	Yes	No
My Pet Hotel 2 Paws and Claws Pet Resort^{US}	DTP Entertainment	DTP Entertainment, Eidos Interactive	September 26, 2008 (PAL)	No	Yes	Yes	No
My Pet School; My Animal School^{EU}	DTP Entertainment	DTP Entertainment	2008 (PAL)	No	No	Yes	No
My Pet Shop	Taito	Taito, Square Enix	July 10, 2008 (JP)	Yes	Yes	Yes	No
My Secret Diary (Note: Primarily a diary and organiser application, though it includes several mini-games.)	Oxygen Games	Oxygen Games	October 17, 2008 (PAL)	No	Yes	Yes	No
My Secret World by Imagine	Ubisoft	Ubisoft	September 16, 2008 (NA)	No	Yes	Yes	No
My Spanish Coach	Ubisoft	Ubisoft	November 6, 2007 (NA)	No	Yes	Yes	No
My Spanish Coach Level 2: Intermediate	Ubisoft	Ubisoft	November 23, 2007 (PAL)	No	No	Yes	No
My Stop Smoking Coach: Allen Carr's EasyWay	Ubisoft	Ubisoft	November 11, 2008 (NA)	No	Yes	Yes	Yes
My Vet Practice: In the Country	Independent Arts	dtp Young Entertainment	November 14, 2008 (NA)	No	No	Yes	No
My Virtual Tutor: Reading First Grade to Second Grade	1st Playable Productions	Mentor Interactive	September 15, 2009 (NA)	No	Yes	No	No
My Virtual Tutor: Reading Kindergarten to First Grade	1st Playable Productions	Mentor Interactive	September 15, 2009 (NA)	No	Yes	No	No
My Virtual Tutor: Reading Pre-K to Kindergarten	1st Playable Productions	Mentor Interactive	September 15, 2009 (NA)	No	Yes	No	No
My Word Coach; Mon Coach Personnel: J'enrichis Mon Vocabulaire^{FR}	Ubisoft Montreal	Ubisoft	November 6, 2007 (NA)	No	Yes	Yes	No
My World, My Way	Global A Entertainment	Atlus, Global A Entertainment, Rising Star Games	June 12, 2008 (JP)	Yes	Yes	Yes	No
MySims	EA Redwood Shores	EA Games, Electronic Arts	September 18, 2007 (NA)	Yes	Yes	Yes	No
MySims Agents	EA Redwood Shores	Electronic Arts	September 25, 2009 (NA)	Yes	Yes	Yes	No
MySims Kingdom	EA Redwood Shores	Electronic Arts	October 28, 2008 (NA)	Yes	Yes	Yes	No
MySims Party	EA Montreal	Electronic Arts	March 10, 2009 (NA)	Yes	Yes	Yes	No
MySims Racing	EA Black Box	Electronic Arts	June 8, 2009 (NA)	Yes	Yes	Yes	No
MySims SkyHeroes	EA Black Box	Electronic Arts	September 28, 2010 (NA)	No	Yes	Yes	No
Myst	Cyan Worlds	Midway Games, Empire Interactive	December 7, 2007 (PAL)	No	Yes	Yes	No
Mysterious Adventures in the Caribbean	Licensed 4U	Licensed 4U	November 26, 2010 (PAL)	No	No	Yes	Yes
The Mysterious Case of Dr. Jekyll & Mr. Hyde	Joindots	O-Games	December 3, 2010 (PAL)	No	Yes	Yes	No
Mystery Case Files: MillionHeir	Big Fish Games	Nintendo	September 8, 2008 (NA)	No	Yes	Yes	No
Mystery Case Files: Prime Suspects	Big Fish Games	MSL	June 28, 2013 (EU)	No	No	Yes	No
Mystery Case Files: Ravenhearst	Big Fish Games	MSL	April 19, 2013 (EU)	No	No	Yes	No
Mystery Dungeon: Shiren the Wanderer	Chunsoft	Sega	December 14, 2006 (JP)	Yes	Yes	Yes	Yes
Mystery Mansion; O.M.G. 26: Our Mini Games^{US} Houkago no Mystery Club: 26 no Tobira^{JP}	Dreams Interactive	505 Games	May 1, 2008 (PAL)	Yes	Yes	Yes	No
Mystery P.I.: Portrait of a Thief	Black Lantern Studios	PopCap Games	December 19, 2008 (PAL)	No	Yes	Yes	No
Mystery Stories	Cerasus Media	GSP Games	December 24, 2008 (EU)	No	Yes	Yes	Yes
Mystery Stories: Curse of the Ancient Spirits	Cerasus Media	Avanquest Software	April 15, 2011 (EU)	No	Yes	Yes	No
Mystery Tales 2: The Spirit Mask	Easy Interactive	Easy Interactive	August 21, 2011 (EU)	No	Yes	Yes	No
Mystery Tales: Time Travel	Most Wanted Entertainment	Foreign Media	April 1, 2009 (EU)	No	Yes	Yes	No
N+	SilverBirch Studios, Slick Entertainment	Atari	August 26, 2008 (NA)	No	Yes	No	No
Nacho Libre	Budcat Creations	Eidos Interactive, Majesco	October 26, 2006 (NA)	No	Yes	Yes	No
Nadia Megafun Land	Atari SA	Atari SA	September 16, 2008 (EU)	No	No	Yes	No
Nadia's World; Le Monde de Nadia^{FR}	Atari SA	Atari SA	December 3, 2007 (EU)	No	No	Yes	No
Nakayoshi All-Stars: Mezase Gakuen Idol	Creative Core	Creative Core	December 18, 2008 (JP)	Yes	No	No	No
Nakayoshi Quiz no Oshigo to Theme Park	Culture Brain	Culture Brain	June 16, 2011 (JP)	Yes	No	No	No
Namco Museum DS	Namco, Namco Bandai Games	Namco Bandai Games, Atari	September 18, 2007 (NA)	Yes	Yes	Yes	No
NANA: Live Staff Daiboshuu! Shoshinsha Kangei	Konami	Konami	June 21, 2007 (JP)	Yes	No	No	No
Nanashi no Game	Square Enix	Square Enix	July 3, 2008 (JP)	Yes	No	No	No
Nanashi no Game Me	Square Enix	Square Enix	August 27, 2009 (JP)	Yes	No	No	No
Nanatsuiro * Drops: Touch de Hajimaru Hatsukoi Monogatari	Media Works	Media Works	May 15, 2008 (JP)	Yes	No	No	No
Nancy Drew: Deadly Secret of Olde World Park	Gorilla Systems	Eidos Interactive, Majesco	September 18, 2007 (NA)	No	Yes	Yes	No
Nancy Drew: The Hidden Staircase	Gorilla Systems	Majesco	September 18, 2007 (NA)	No	Yes	No	No
Nancy Drew: The Model Mysteries	AWE Games	THQ	February 10, 2010 (NA)	No	Yes	Yes	No
Nancy Drew: The Mystery of the Clue Bender Society	Gorilla Systems	Majesco	July 23, 2008 (NA)	No	Yes	No	No
Nanda's Island	MumboJumbo	MumboJumbo	March 28, 2011 (NA)	No	Yes	No	No
Nankoku Sodachi DS	Commseed	Commseed	December 24, 2009 (JP)	Yes	No	No	No
Nanostray	Shin'en Multimedia	Majesco, Taito Corporation	July 19, 2005 (EU)	Yes	Yes	Yes	No
Nanostray 2	Shin'en Multimedia	Codemasters, Majesco	March 11, 2008 (NA)	No	Yes	Yes	No
Nanpure VOW	From Software	From Software	April 26, 2007 (JP)	Yes	No	No	No
Napoleon Dynamite: The Game	7 Studios	Crave Entertainment	October 30, 2007 (NA)	No	Yes	No	No
Naraba's World: Labyrinth of Light	Micronet	Micronet	April 26, 2007 (EU)	No	No	Yes	No
Naraba's World: The Mysterious Palace	Micronet	Micronet	April 3, 2012 (EU)	No	No	Yes	No
Naruto RPG 2: Chidori vs. Rasengan	Tomy	Tomy	July 14, 2005 (JP)	Yes	No	No	No
Naruto Shippūden: Dairansen! Kage Bunshin Emaki	Takara Tomy	Takara Tomy	February 14, 2008 (JP)	Yes	No	No	No
Naruto Shippūden: Naruto vs. Sasuke	Takara Tomy	Takara Tomy, Tomy	July 10, 2008 (JP)	Yes	Yes	Yes	No
Naruto Shippūden: Ninja Council 4 Naruto: Ninja Council 3 European Version^{EU}	Takara Tomy	Takara Tomy, Tomy	April 27, 2006 (JP)	Yes	Yes	Yes	No
Naruto Shippūden: Ninja Destiny 2	Takara Tomy	Takara Tomy, Tomy	April 24, 2008 (JP)	Yes	Yes	Yes	No
Naruto Shippūden: Shinobi Retsuden 3	Takara Tomy	Takara Tomy	April 29, 2009 (JP)	Yes	No	No	No
Naruto Shippūden: Shinobi Rumble	Takara Tomy	Takara Tomy	April 22, 2010 (JP)	Yes	Yes	No	No
Naruto: Ninja Council 2 European Version; Naruto: Saikyou Ninja Daikesshuu 3^{JP}	Takara Tomy	Takara Tomy, Tomy	April 21, 2005 (JP)	Yes	No	Yes	No
Naruto: Ninja Council 3 Naruto: Ninja Council European Version ^{EU} Naruto: Saikyou Ninja Daikesshu 4^{JP}	Aspect	D3 Publisher, Tomy, Nintendo	April 27, 2006 (JP)	Yes	Yes	Yes	No
Naruto: Ninja Destiny	Takara Tomy	D3 Publisher, Namco Bandai Games, Tomy	December 14, 2006 (JP)	Yes	Yes	Yes	Yes
Naruto: Path of the Ninja; Naruto RPG 3: Reijuu vs. Konoha Shoutai^{JP}	Tose	D3 Publisher	October 23, 2007 (NA)	Yes	Yes	No	No
Naruto: Path of the Ninja 2	Tose	D3 Publisher	July 13, 2006 (JP)	Yes	Yes	No	No
Natalie Brooks: Mystery at Hillcrest High	Alawar Entertainment	Licensed 4U	April 6, 2012 (EU)	No	No	Yes	No
Natalie Brooks: The Treasures of the Lost Kingdom	Joindots	Foreign Media	October 8, 2010 (EU)	No	No	Yes	No
National Geographic Panda	Namco Bandai Games	Namco Bandai Games America	July 31, 2008 (JP)	Yes	Yes	No	No
Nazo Nazo & Quiz Ittou Nyuukon Q Mate!	WinkySoft	Konami	October 16, 2008 (JP)	Yes	No	No	No
Need for Speed Carbon: Own the City	Exient Entertainment	EA Games	October 31, 2006 (NA)	No	Yes	Yes	Yes
Need for Speed: Most Wanted	EA Canada	Electronic Arts	November 11, 2005 (EU)	No	Yes	Yes	No
Need for Speed: Nitro	Firebrand Games	EA Games	November 2, 2009 (NA)	Yes	Yes	Yes	Yes
Need for Speed: ProStreet	Exient Entertainment	EA Games	November 13, 2007 (NA)	No	Yes	Yes	Yes
Need for Speed: Undercover	Firebrand Games	Electronic Arts	November 17, 2008 (NA)	No	Yes	Yes	Yes
Need for Speed: Underground 2	EA Canada	EA Games	May 10, 2005 (NA)	No	Yes	Yes	Yes
Negima!? Chou Mahora Taisen Chuu: Checkiin Zenin Shuugou! Yappari Onsen Kichaimashitaa	Natsume Co., Ltd.	Marvelous Entertainment	March 22, 2007 (JP)	Yes	No	No	No
Negima!? Chou Mahora Taisen Kattoiin, Keiyaku Shikkou Dechai masuu	Natsume Co., Ltd.	Marvelous Entertainment	October 26, 2006 (JP)	Yes	No	No	No
Neighbours from Hell	JoWooD Productions	Pinnacle	November 21, 2008 (PAL)	No	No	Yes	No
Neko Neko Bakery DS	Hoget	Hoget	August 6, 2009 (JP)	Yes	No	No	No
Neopets Puzzle Adventure	Griptonite Games, Infinitive Interactive	Capcom	November 25, 2008 (NA)	No	Yes	Yes	No
Nep League DS	Jaleco Entertainment	Jaleco Entertainment	December 6, 2007 (JP)	Yes	No	No	No
Nervous Brickdown	Arkedo Studio	Eidos Interactive, Success	June 26, 2007 (NA)	Yes	Yes	Yes	No
Net Ghost Pipopa: Pipopa DS @ Daibouken!!!	Dimple Entertainment	Dimple Entertainment	February 26, 2009 (JP)	Yes	No	No	No
Nettou! Powerful Koushien	Konami	Konami	March 18, 2010 (JP)	Yes	No	No	No
Neves	Yuke's	Atlus, Ignition Entertainment, Yuke's	November 6, 2007 (NA)	Yes	Yes	Yes	No
The New Adventures of Moomin: The Great Autumn Party	Yuke's	Atlus, Gaffiti Entertainment, Yuke's	March 13, 2009 (NA)	No	Yes	Yes	No
The New Adventures of Moomin: The Mysterious Howling	Yuke's	Atlus, Gaffiti Entertainment, Yuke's	April 30, 2008 (EU)	No	Yes	Yes	No
New Carnival Games	Cat Daddy Games	2K Play	September 21, 2010 (NA)	No	Yes	Yes	No
New Horizon English Course 1	Paon Corporation	Paon Corporation	March 22, 2012 (JP)	Yes	No	No	No
New Horizon English Course 1 DS (Note: Primarily an English-textbook learning application, though it includes a separate Game mode alongside its textbook exercises, workbook, vocabulary list and notes.)	Paon Corporation	Paon Corporation	April 24, 2008 (JP)	Yes	No	No	No
New Horizon English Course 2	Paon Corporation	Paon Corporation	March 22, 2012 (JP)	Yes	No	No	No
New Horizon English Course 2 DS (Note: Primarily an English-textbook learning application, though it includes a separate Game mode alongside its textbook exercises, workbook, vocabulary list and notes.)	Paon Corporation	Paon Corporation	April 24, 2008 (JP)	Yes	No	No	No
New Horizon English Course 3	Paon Corporation	Paon Corporation	March 22, 2012 (JP)	Yes	No	No	No
New Horizon English Course 3 DS (Note: Primarily an English-textbook learning application, though it includes a separate Game mode alongside its textbook exercises, workbook, vocabulary list and notes.)	Paon Corporation	Paon Corporation	April 24, 2008 (JP)	Yes	No	No	No
New International Track & Field	Sumo Digital	Konami	July 22, 2008 (NA)	Yes	Yes	Yes	No
New Super Mario Bros.	Nintendo	Nintendo	May 15, 2006 (NA)	Yes	Yes	Yes	Yes
New Touch Party Game; Touch Game Party^{JP}	ASK	Taito	September 29, 2005 (JP)	Yes	No	Yes	No
New Unō Kids DS	IE Institute	IE Institute	November 13, 2008 (JP)	Yes	No	No	No
The New York Times Crosswords	Budcat Creations	Majesco	May 29, 2007 (NA)	No	Yes	Yes	No
New Zealand Story Revolution	Marvelous Entertainment	CyberFront, Ignition Entertainment, Rising Star Games	February 2, 2007 (PAL)	Yes	Yes	Yes	No
Ni Hao, Kai-Lan: New Year's Celebration	Black Lantern Studios	Take-Two Interactive	November 3, 2009 (NA)	No	Yes	Yes	No
Ni no Kuni: Shikkoku no Madoushi	Level 5	Level 5	December 9, 2009 (JP)	Yes	No	No	No
Nickelodeon Big Time Rush: Backstage Pass	Black Lantern Studios	GameMill Entertainment	November 13, 2012 (NA)	No	Yes	Yes	No
Nickelodeon Dora Puppy	Black Lantern Studios	Take-Two Interactive	November 3, 2009 (NA)	No	Yes	Yes	No
Nickelodeon Dora's Cooking Club	Black Lantern Studios	2K Play	November 1, 2011 (NA)	No	Yes	Yes	Yes
Nickelodeon Team Umizoomi	Black Lantern Studios	Take-Two Interactive	October 26, 2010 (NA)	No	Yes	Yes	No
Nicktoons MLB	Black Lantern Studios	2K Play	September 13, 2011 (NA)	No	Yes	No	No
Nicktoons Unite!	Climax Action	THQ	March 3, 2006 (PAL)	No	Yes	Yes	No
Nicktoons: Attack of the Toybots	Natsume Co., Ltd.	THQ	October 23, 2007 (NA)	Yes	Yes	Yes	No
Nicktoons: Battle for Volcano Island	Natsume Co., Ltd.	THQ	October 24, 2006 (NA)	Yes	Yes	Yes	No
Nicola Kanshuu: Model * Oshare Audition	Infinity	Alchemist	April 1, 2010 (JP)	Yes	No	No	No
Night at the Museum: Battle of the Smithsonian	Majesco	Majesco	May 5, 2009 (NA)	No	Yes	Yes	No
Nine Hours, Nine Persons, Nine Doors	Chunsoft	Spike, Aksys Games	December 10, 2009 (JP)	Yes	Yes	No	No
Ninja Captains	In-house	Nordcurrent	October 16, 2009 (EU)	No	No	Yes	No
Ninja Gaiden Dragon Sword	Team Ninja	Tecmo, Ubisoft	March 20, 2008 (JP)	Yes	Yes	Yes	No
Ninja Reflex	Sanzaru Games	Electronic Arts	March 4, 2008 (NA)	No	Yes	Yes	No
Ninjatown	Venan Entertainment	SouthPeak Games	October 28, 2008 (NA)	No	Yes	Yes	No
Nintama Rantarou: Gakunen Taikousen Puzzle! no Dan	Russel	Russel	September 2, 2010 (JP)	Yes	No	No	No
Nintama Rantarou: Nintama no Tame no Ninjutsu Training	Russel	Russel	March 26, 2009 (JP)	Yes	No	No	No
Nintendogs: Best Friends	Nintendo	Nintendo	October 24, 2005 (NA)	No	Yes	No	No
Nintendogs: Chihuahua and Friends	Nintendo	Nintendo	April 21, 2005 (JP)	Yes	Yes	Yes	No
Nintendogs: Dachshund and Friends	Nintendo	Nintendo	April 21, 2005 (JP)	Yes	Yes	Yes	No
Nintendogs: Dalmatian and Friends	Nintendo	Nintendo	June 16, 2006 (PAL)	No	Yes	Yes	No
Nintendogs: Lab and Friends; Nintendogs: Shiba and Friends^{JP}	Nintendo	Nintendo	April 21, 2005 (JP)	Yes	Yes	Yes	No
Nippon Futsal League Kounin: Minna no DS Futsal	Jorudan	Jorudan	July 24, 2008 (JP)	Yes	No	No	No
Nippon Golfers Kentei DS	Microvision	Dimple Entertainment	June 18, 2009 (JP)	Yes	No	No	No
Nobunaga no Yabou DS 2	Koei	Koei	July 31, 2008 (JP)	Yes	No	No	No
Nobunaga's Ambition DS	Koei	Koei	April 27, 2006 (JP)	Yes	No	No	No
Nodame Cantabile	Namco Bandai Games	Namco Bandai Games	April 19, 2007 (JP)	Yes	No	No	No
Nodame Cantabile: Tanoshii Ongaku no Jikan Desu	Namco Bandai Games	Namco Bandai Games	February 18, 2010 (JP)	Yes	No	No	No
Noddy in Toyland	Uacari	Avanquest Software	June 15, 2011 (EU)	No	No	Yes	No
Nora to Toki no Kōbō: Kiri no Mori no Majo	Atlus	Atlus	July 21, 2011 (JP)	Yes	No	No	No
Norimono Oukoku DS: You! Unten Shichai na Yo!	Tamsoft	D3Publisher	August 28, 2010 (JP)	Yes	No	No	No
Norinori Relakkuma: Hit Song Ongakusai	Rocket Company	Rocket Company	December 2, 2010 (JP)	Yes	No	No	No
Nostalgia	Matrix Software, Red Entertainment	Ignition Entertainment, Tecmo	November 6, 2008 (JP)	Yes	Yes	No	No
Nounai Aesthe: IQ Suppli DS	Art	Spike	December 21, 2006 (JP)	Yes	No	No	No
Nounai Aesthe: IQ Suppli DS 2: Sukkiri King Ketteisen	Art	Spike	November 22, 2007 (JP)	Yes	No	No	No
Nova Usagi no Game de Ryuugaku!? DS	Konami	Konami	February 22, 2007 (JP)	Yes	No	No	No
NRL Mascot Mania	Wicked Witch Software	Tru Blu Games	June 26, 2009 (AU)	No	No	No	Yes
Numpla 10000-Mon	Skonec	Success	March 8, 2007 (JP)	Yes	No	No	No
Nursery Mania; Real Stories Babies^{FR}	Collision Studios	Zoo Games	July 6, 2010 (NA)	No	Yes	Yes	No
Ochaken no Daibouken 2: Yume Ippai no Omocha Hako	MTO	MTO	December 18, 2008 (JP)	Yes	No	No	No
Ochaken no Daibouken: Honwaku Yumemiru Sekai Ryoukou	MTO	MTO	December 20, 2007 (JP)	Yes	No	No	No
Ochaken no Heya DS	MTO	MTO	April 27, 2006 (JP)	Yes	No	No	No
Ochaken no Heya DS 2	MTO	MTO	January 18, 2007 (JP)	Yes	No	No	No
Ochaken no Heya DS 3	MTO	MTO	May 22, 2008 (JP)	Yes	No	No	No
Ochaken no Heya DS 4	MTO	MTO	November 26, 2009 (JP)	Yes	No	No	No
Odenkun: Tanoshii Oden Mura	Hudson	Hudson	June 26, 2008 (JP)	Yes	No	No	No
Odoru Daisousasen The Game: Sensuikan ni Sennyuu Seyo!	Bandai Namco Games	Bandai Namco Games	July 15, 2009 (JP)	Yes	No	No	No
Oekaki Puzzle Battle Vol. 1: Yuusha-Oh GaoGaiGar Version	Sunrise Interactive	Sunrise Interactive	December 8, 2005 (JP)	Yes	No	No	No
Ogwangui Darin DS	Daewon Media	Daewon Media	December 3, 2009 (JP)	Yes	No	No	No
Oha Star 645: Musshees no Fushigi na Nouen - Yoshimoto Geinin to Tomodachi Net	Culture Brain	Culture Brain	November 23, 2011 (JP)	Yes	No	No	No
Ojaru-Maru DS: Ojaru to Okeiko Aiueo	D3Publisher	D3Publisher	December 20, 2007 (JP)	Yes	No	No	No
OK! Puzzle Stars	Team 3 Games	Ubisoft	April 30, 2009 (EU)	No	No	Yes	No
Okaeri! Chibi-Robo! Happy Richie Oosouji!	Skip Ltd.	Nintendo	January 23, 2009 (JP)	Yes	No	No	No
Oktoberfest: The Official Game	Independent Arts	SevenOne Intermedia	August 6, 2009 (EU)	No	No	Yes	No
One Piece: Gear Spirit	Matrix Software	Namco Bandai Games	August 30, 2007 (JP)	Yes	No	No	No
One Piece: Gigant Battle!	Ganbarion	Bandai Namco Games	September 9, 2010 (JP)	Yes	No	Yes	No
One Piece: Gigant Battle! 2 - New World	Ganbarion	Bandai Namco Games	November 17, 2011 (JP)	Yes	No	No	No
Onegai My Melody	TDK Core	TDK Core	December 22, 2005 (JP)	Yes	No	No	No
Oni Zero: Sengoku Ransei Hyakkaryouran	Shannon	Compile Heart	August 30, 2007 (JP)	Yes	No	No	No
Onsei Kanjou Sokuteiki: Kokoro Scan	Sega	Sega	August 16, 2007 (JP)	Yes	No	No	No
Ontamarama	Noise Factory	Atlus, Noise Factory	June 7, 2007 (JP)	Yes	Yes	No	No
Ookami to Koushinryou	Media Works	ASCII Media Works	June 26, 2008 (JP)	Yes	No	No	No
Ookami to Koushinryou: Umiowataru Kaze	Media Works	ASCII Media Works	September 17, 2009 (JP)	Yes	No	No	No
Ookiku Furika Butte	Marvelous Entertainment	Marvelous Entertainment	December 13, 2007 (JP)	Yes	No	No	No
Open Season	Ubisoft	Ubisoft	September 19, 2006 (NA)	No	Yes	Yes	No
Operation: Vietnam	Coyote Console	Eidos Interactive, Majesco	August 20, 2007 (NA)	No	Yes	Yes	No
Orcs & Elves	Fountainhead Entertainment, id Software	Electronic Arts	November 13, 2007 (NA)	No	Yes	Yes	No
Ore ga Omae o Mamoru	Vingt-et-un Systems	Idea Factory	May 21, 2009 (JP)	Yes	No	No	No
Ore-Sama Kingdom: Koi no Manga mo Debut o Mokushise! Doki Doki Love Lesson	Bandai Namco Games	Bandai Namco Games	November 23, 2011 (JP)	Yes	No	No	No
Orient Quest	Media Art	rondomedia	April 4, 2011 (EU)	No	No	Yes	No
Original Frisbee Disc Sports: Ultimate & Golf	Skyworks Technologies	Destination Software	September 24, 2007 (NA)	No	Yes	No	No
Original Story from Fairy Tail: Gekitotsu! Kardia Daiseidou	AI	Hudson	April 21, 2011 (JP)	Yes	No	No	No
Orla Frosnapper	Krea Medie A/S	Krea Medie A/S	2011 (EU)	No	No	Yes	No
Oscar der Ballonfahrer	The Web Production	Tivola Publishing GmbH	June 28, 2010 (EU)	No	No	Yes	No
Oshare Majo: Love and Berry	Sega	Sega	November 22, 2006 (JP)	Yes	No	No	No
Oshare na Koinu DS	MTO	MTO	September 18, 2011 (JP)	Yes	No	No	No
Oshare ni Koishite 2 Plus	Culture Brain	Culture Brain	May 5, 2012 (JP)	Yes	No	No	No
Oshare Princess DS: Oshare ni Koi Shite 2	Culture Brain	Culture Brain	April 24, 2008 (JP)	Yes	No	No	No
Oshare Princess DS: Oshare ni Koishite!	Culture Brain	Culture Brain	December 16, 2006 (JP)	Yes	No	No	No
Oshiri Kajiri Mushi no Rhythm Lesson DS: Kawai Ongaku Kyoushitsu Kanshuu	Sega	Sega	April 10, 2008 (JP)	Yes	No	No	No
Osu! Tatakae! Ouendan	iNiS	Nintendo	July 28, 2005 (JP)	Yes	No	No	No
Othello de Othello DS	MegaHouse	MegaHouse	June 12, 2008 (JP)	Yes	No	No	No
Otogi Juushi Akazukin	Tenky	Konami	December 7, 2008 (JP)	Yes	No	No	No
Otometeki Koi Kakumei * Love Revo!! DS	HuneX	GungHo	February 14, 2008 (JP)	Yes	No	No	No
Otona no DS Mystery: Idumi Jiken File	ScriptArts	Interchannel	October 11, 2007 (JP)	Yes	No	No	No
Otoshi Deka: Keiji-San, Watashi ga Yarimashita	Beyond Interactive	Success	September 18, 2008 (JP)	Yes	No	No	No
Oui-Oui et le grand carnaval des jouets	Avanquest Software	Avanquest Software	July 16, 2013 (EU)	No	No	Yes	No
Oui-Oui grande fete au pays des jouets	Avanquest Software	Avanquest Software	August 18, 2011 (EU)	No	No	Yes	No
Our House	Budcat Creations	Majesco	September 22, 2009 (NA)	No	Yes	No	No
Ouran Koukou Host-Bu DS	Design Factory	Idea Factory	March 19, 2009 (JP)	Yes	No	No	No
Over the Hedge	Vicarious Visions	Activision	May 5, 2006 (NA)	No	Yes	Yes	No
Over the Hedge: Hammy Goes Nuts!	Amaze Entertainment	Activision	October 24, 2006 (NA)	No	Yes	Yes	No
Overlord: Minions	Climax Studios	Codemasters	June 23, 2009 (NA)	No	Yes	Yes	No
Oyaku de Asoberu DS Ehon: Ukkari Penelope	Tecmo	Tecmo	April 24, 2008 (JP)	Yes	No	No	No
Pac 'n Roll	Namco	Namco, Nintendo	July 28, 2005 (JP)	Yes	Yes	Yes	Yes
Pac-Man World 3	Blitz Games	Namco	December 7, 2005 (NA)	No	Yes	Yes	Yes
Pac-Pix	Namco	Namco	March 10, 2005 (JP)	Yes	Yes	Yes	Yes
Paint By DS (Note: Primarily a colouring application, though it includes several mini-games, including sliding puzzles and memory-matching games.)	Ertain	Mercury Games	August 31, 2006 (JP)	Yes	No	Yes	No
Paint by DS: Classic Masterpieces (Note: Primarily a colouring application, though it includes several mini-games.)	Ertain	Mercury Games	January 9, 2009 (JP)	Yes	No	Yes	No
Paint by DS: Military Vehicles (Note: Primarily a colouring application, though it includes four mini-games involving memory, speed and precision, including a sliding puzzle.)	Ertain	Mercury Games	December 1, 2007 (JP)	Yes	No	Yes	No
Pang: Magical Michael	Mitchell Corporation	Rising Star Games	September 17, 2010 (EU)	No	No	Yes	Yes
Panzer Tactics DS	Sproing Interactive Media	10tacle Studios, Conspiracy Entertainment, QV Software	November 6, 2007 (NA)	No	Yes	Yes	No
Party Carnival; Simple DS Series Vol. 6: The Party Game^{JP}	HuneX	D3Publisher	November 23, 2005 (JP)	Yes	No	Yes	No
The Party Unou Quiz	D3 Publisher	D3 Publisher	December 7, 2006 (JP)	Yes	No	No	No
Pass the Pigs	AWE Games	THQ	October 20, 2008 (PAL)	No	Yes	Yes	No
Passeport de CM2 a la 6eme	Sanuk Games	Emme	February 13, 2009 (EU)	No	No	Yes	No
Passeport du CE1 au CE2	Sanuk Games	Emme	February 13, 2009 (EU)	No	No	Yes	No
Passeport du CE2 au CM1	Sanuk Games	Emme	February 13, 2009 (EU)	No	No	Yes	No
Passeport du CM1 au CM2	Sanuk Games	Emme	February 13, 2009 (EU)	No	No	Yes	No
Passeport du CP au CE1	Sanuk Games	Emme	February 13, 2009 (EU)	No	No	Yes	No
Pawly Pets: My Pet Hotel	Ubisoft	Ubisoft	August 29, 2008 (PAL)	No	No	Yes	No
Pawly Pets: My Vet Practice; Paws and Claws: Pet Vet^{EU}	DTP Entertainment	ValuSoft, Ubisoft	February 2, 2007 (PAL)	No	Yes	Yes	No
Paws and Claws Pet Vet 2	ValuSoft	THQ	August 7, 2007 (NA)	No	Yes	No	No
Paws and Claws Pet Vet: Australian Adventures; Real Stories Veterinaire Mission Australie^{EU}	DTP Entertainment	ValuSoft, Ubisoft	August 11, 2009 (AUS)	No	Yes	No	Yes
Paws and Claws Regal Resort	Independent Arts	THQ	July 13, 2010 (NA)	No	Yes	No	No
Paws and Claws: Best Friends - Dogs & Cats	Sproing Interactive Media	PAL: Eidos Interactive; NA: THQ	September 14, 2007 (PAL)	No	Yes	Yes	Yes
Paws and Claws: Marine Rescue	Independent Arts	THQ	January 25, 2011 (NA)	No	Yes	No	No
Paws and Claws: Pampered Pets	Independent Arts	THQ	January 5, 2009 (NA)	No	Yes	No	No
Paws and Claws: Pampered Pets 2	Independent Arts	THQ	May 24, 2011 (NA)	No	Yes	No	No
PDC World Championship Darts 2009	Rebellion Developments	Oxygen Games	May 29, 2009 (EU)	No	Yes	Yes	No
Peggle: Dual Shot	Q Entertainment	PopCap Games	February 25, 2009 (NA)	No	Yes	No	No
Pekin Express: La route de L'Himalaya	Mindscape	Mindscape	January 13, 2009 (EU)	No	No	Yes	No
Pen 1 Grand Prix: Penguin no Mondai Special	Konami	Konami	December 10, 2009 (JP)	Yes	No	No	No
Penguin no Mondai: Saikyou Penguin Densetsu!	Konami	Konami	December 11, 2008 (JP)	Yes	No	No	No
Penguin no Mondai: Tenkuu no 7 Senshi	Konami	Konami	July 23, 2009 (JP)	Yes	No	No	No
Penguin no Mondai: The World	Konami	Konami	December 2, 2010 (JP)	Yes	No	No	No
Peppa Pig	Asylum Entertainment	Pinnacle	November 28, 2008 (EU)	No	No	Yes	No
Peppa Pig: Fun and Games	P2 Games	P2 Games	March 26, 2010 (EU)	No	No	Yes	No
Peppa Pig: Theme Park Fun	P2 Games	P2 Games	March 25, 2011 (EU)	No	No	Yes	No
Percy Jackson & the Olympians: The Lightning Thief	Griptonite Games	Activision	February 11, 2010 (NA)	No	Yes	Yes	No
Pet Adoption Center	Ubisoft	Ubisoft	June 30, 2008 (NA)	No	Yes	No	No
Pet Alien: An Intergalactic Puzzlepalooza	Shin'en Multimedia	The Game Factory	August 28, 2007 (NA)	No	Yes	Yes	No
Pet Pals: Animal Doctor; Real Adventures:Pet Vet ^{EU}	Legacy Interactive	Majesco	February 7, 2008 (NA)	No	Yes	No	No
Pet Pals: New Leash on Life; Animal Rescue Centre^{EU}	Legacy Interactive	Majesco	October 22, 2008 (NA)	No	Yes	Yes	No
Pet Shop Monogatari DS 2	Taito	Taito	April 1, 2010 (JP)	Yes	No	No	No
Pet Vet: Down Under; My Animal Centre in Australia^{EU/AUS}	Deep Silver	Deep Silver	November 23, 2007 (EU)	No	Yes	Yes	Yes
Peter Jackson's King Kong: The Official Game of the Movie	Ubisoft Casablanca	Ubisoft	November 21, 2005 (NA)	Yes	Yes	Yes	No
Peter Pan's Playground	Phoenix Games	Phoenix Games	July 23, 2008 (EU)	No	No	Yes	No
Petit Fute - Travel and Play	Otaboo	Neko Entertainment	May 22, 2008 (EU)	No	No	Yes	No
Petz Fantasy: Moonlight Magic	Ubisoft	Ubisoft	October 5, 2010 (NA)	No	Yes	No	No
Petz Fantasy: Sunshine Magic; Petz Fantasy^{EU}	Ubisoft	Ubisoft	October 5, 2010 (NA)	No	Yes	Yes	Yes
Petz Fashion: Dogz & Catz; Petz: Fashion Stars^{EU}	Ubisoft	Ubisoft	June 9, 2009 (NA)	No	Yes	Yes	Yes
Petz Rescue: Endangered Paradise	Phoenix Interactive Entertainment	Ubisoft	November 18, 2008 (NA)	No	Yes	No	No
Petz Rescue: Ocean Patrol	Magic Pockets	Ubisoft	October 11, 2008 (NA)	No	Yes	No	No
Petz Rescue: Wildlife Vet	Lexis Numerique, Virtual Toys	Ubisoft	October 11, 2008 (NA)	No	Yes	No	No
Petz Wild Animals: Dolphinz	Magic Pockets	Ubisoft	October 16, 2007 (NA)	No	Yes	No	No
Petz Wild Animals: Tigerz	Magic Pockets	Ubisoft	February 26, 2008 (NA)	No	Yes	No	No
Petz: Bunnyz	Ubisoft	Digital Kids, Ubisoft	March 4, 2008 (NA)	No	Yes	Yes	No
Petz: Bunnyz Bunch	Ubisoft	Ubisoft	March 8, 2011 (NA)	No	Yes	Yes	No
Petz: Catz 2	Ubisoft	Ubisoft	November 9, 2007 (PAL)	Yes	Yes	Yes	No
Petz: Catz Clan; My Kitten Family^{JP}	Ubisoft	Ubisoft	November 18, 2008 (PAL)	Yes	Yes	Yes	No
Petz: Catz Playground	Ubisoft	Ubisoft	October 26, 2010 (PAL)	No	Yes	Yes	No
Petz: Dogz 2 (Nintendo DS video game)Petz: Dogz 2	MTO	Ubisoft	October 12, 2007 (PAL)	No	Yes	Yes	No
Petz: Dogz Fashion	Ubisoft	Ubisoft	June 17, 2008 (NA)	No	Yes	Yes	No
Petz: Dogz Pack; Petz: My Puppy Family^{EU}	Ubisoft	Ubisoft	November 4, 2008 (NA)	Yes	Yes	Yes	No
Petz: Dogz Talent Show	Ubisoft	Ubisoft	November 17, 2009 (NA)	Yes	Yes	Yes	No
Petz: Dolphinz Encounter	Magic Pockets	Ubisoft	October 27, 2010 (NA)	No	No	Yes	No
Petz: Hamsterz 2	Ubisoft	Ubisoft	November 9, 2007 (PAL)	No	Yes	Yes	No
Petz: Hamsterz Superstarz	Ubisoft	Ubisoft	November 17, 2009 (NA)	Yes	Yes	No	No
Petz: Horseshoe Ranch; Petz: My Horse Family^{EU}	Digital Kids	Ubisoft	January 27, 2009 (NA)	Yes	Yes	Yes	Yes
Petz: Horsez 2 Horsez: Adventures on the Ranch^{EU}	Virtual Toys	Ubisoft	November 14, 2007 (NA)	No	Yes	Yes	Yes
Petz: Horsez Family	Digital Kids	Ubisoft	October 24, 2010 (NA)	Yes	Yes	Yes	Yes
Petz: Monkeyz House	Ubisoft	Ubisoft	November 18, 2008 (NA)	No	Yes	No	No
Petz: Nursery	Ubisoft	Ubisoft	November 10, 2009 (NA)	No	Yes	Yes	No
Petz: Nursery 2 Petz: Playschool^{EU}	Ubisoft	Ubisoft	November 2, 2010 (NA)	No	Yes	Yes	No
Petz: Pony Beauty Pageant; Poney Club by Alexandra Ledermann^{EU}	Ubisoft	Ubisoft	October 13, 2009 (NA)	No	Yes	Yes	No
Petz: Puppyz & Kittenz	Ubisoft	Ubisoft	October 18, 2011 (NA)	No	Yes	Yes	No
Phantasy Star Zero	Sega	Sega	December 25, 2008 (JP)	Yes	Yes	Yes	No
Phil Taylor's Power Play Darts	Iguana Entertainment	Funbox Media	December 2, 2010 (NA)	No	No	Yes	No
Phineas and Ferb	Altron	Disney Interactive Studios	February 3, 2009 (NA)	No	Yes	Yes	No
Phineas and Ferb: Across the 2nd Dimension	Altron	Disney Interactive Studios	August 2, 2011 (NA)	No	Yes	Yes	No
Phineas and Ferb: Quest for Cool Stuff	Majesco	Disney Interactive Studios	August 13, 2013 (NA)	No	Yes	Yes	Yes
Phineas and Ferb: Ride Again	Altron	Disney Interactive Studios	September 14, 2010 (NA)	No	Yes	Yes	Yes
Phoenix Wright: Ace Attorney	Capcom	Capcom	September 15, 2005 (JP)	Yes	Yes	Yes	Yes
Phoenix Wright: Ace Attorney − Justice for All	Capcom	Capcom	October 26, 2006 (JP)	Yes	Yes	Yes	Yes
Phoenix Wright: Ace Attorney − Trials and Tribulations	Capcom	Capcom	August 23, 2007 (JP)	Yes	Yes	Yes	Yes
Phonics de Minitsuku Eigo	Meister Hero	Meister Hero	March 25, 2010 (JP)	Yes	No	No	No
Photo Phantasy	7Raven Studios	Zoo Games	February 8, 2011 (EU)	No	No	Yes	No
Pic Pic	Success Corporation	505 Games, Success Corporation	April 26, 2007 (JP)	Yes	No	Yes	No
Picross 3D	Nintendo	Nintendo	March 12, 2009 (JP)	Yes	Yes	Yes	Yes
Picross DS	Jupiter	Nintendo	January 25, 2007 (JP)	Yes	Yes	Yes	Yes
Pictionary	ImaginEngine	THQ	November 14, 2010 (NA)	No	Yes	Yes	Yes
PictoImage	Sega	Sega	September 27, 2007 (JP)	Yes	Yes	Yes	No
Picture Puzzle Collection: The Dutch Masters	Most Wanted Entertainment	Foreign Media	November 26, 2010 (EU)	No	No	Yes	No
Pillow Pets	1st Playable Productions	GameMill Publishing	October 25, 2011 (EU)	No	No	Yes	No
Pimp My Ride: Street Racing	Virtuos	Activision	March 24, 2009 (NA)	No	Yes	No	No
Pinball Deluxe	Anuman Interactive	Atari SA	February 19, 2009 (EU)	No	No	Yes	No
Ping Pals	WayForward Technologies	THQ	December 8, 2004 (NA)	No	Yes	Yes	No
Pingu no Waku Waku Carnival!	Square Enix	Square Enix	November 6, 2008 (JP)	Yes	No	No	No
Pinkalicious	1st Playable Productions	GameMill Publishing	March 29, 2011 (EU)	No	No	Yes	No
Pipe Mania	Empire Interactive	Atari, Empire Interactive	September 23, 2008 (NA)	No	Yes	Yes	No
Pippi Longstocking	Ravn Studio	PAN Vision	September 28, 2009 (EU)	No	No	Yes	No
Pirates of the Caribbean: At World's End	Amaze Entertainment	Disney Interactive Studios, Eurocom	May 22, 2007 (NA)	Yes	Yes	Yes	No
Pirates of the Caribbean: Dead Man's Chest	Griptonite Games	Buena Vista Games, D3 Publisher	June 27, 2006 (NA)	Yes	Yes	Yes	No
Pirates: Duels on the High Seas	Oxygen Games	Oxygen Games	September 12, 2008 (PAL)	No	Yes	Yes	No
Pixeline Dansk: Kaos i Kommakobing; Josefine: Skolehjelp^{NOR}	Krea Media	Krea Media	2009 (EU)	No	No	Yes	No
Pixeline Skolehjaelp: Engelsk - Goes to London; Josefine Skolehjelp: Engelsk - Mystery in London^{NOR} Josefiina Alkupolku Englannin kieli - Mysteeri Lontoossa^{FIN}	Krea Media	Krea Media	2011 (EU)	No	No	Yes	No
Pixeline Skolehjaelp: Laer At Stave Stavning Eller Kaos; Josefine Skolehjelp: Laer a Stave^{NOR}	Krea Media	Krea Media	2011 (EU)	No	No	Yes	No
Pixeline Skolehjaelp: Matematik - Tager over Talstrup; Josefine Skolehjelp: Matematikk^{NOR} Josefiina Alkupolku: Matematiikka - Sumua Lukukylaen Yllae^{FIN}	Krea Media	Krea Media	2011 (EU)	No	No	Yes	No
Pixeline: Hotel Skrottenborg; Josefine: Hotell Skrotenborg^{NOR}	Krea Media	Krea Media	2011 (EU)	No	No	Yes	No
Pixeline: Jungleskatten; Josefine: Jungelskatten^{NOR}	Krea Media	Krea Media	2011 (EU)	No	No	Yes	No
Pixeline: Magi i Pixieland; Josefine: Magi i Eventyrland^{NOR}	Krea Media	Krea Media	2011 (EU)	No	No	Yes	No
Pixeline: og Drommespejlet; Josefine: og Droemmespeilet^{NOR} Josefiina Alkupolku: Seikkailumaa - Unelmien peili^{FIN}	Krea Media	Krea Media	2008 (EU)	No	No	Yes	No
Piyodamari DS	Samg Games	Samg Games	September 17, 2010 (KR)	Yes	No	No	No
Planet 51	Pyro Studios	Sega	November 17, 2009 (NA)	No	Yes	Yes	Yes
Planet Puzzle League	Intelligent Systems	Nintendo	April 26, 2007 (JP)	Yes	Yes	Yes	No
Planet Rescue: Ocean Patrol	Ubisoft	Ubisoft	November 13, 2008 (EU)	No	No	Yes	Yes
Plants vs. Zombies	PopCap Games	PopCap Games	January 18, 2011 (NA)	No	Yes	Yes	No
Platinum Sudoku	Gameloft	Ubisoft	May 11, 2007 (PAL)	No	Yes	Yes	No
Playmobil Knight: Hero of the Kingdom	Morgen Studios	Dreamcatcher	November 13, 2009 (EU)	No	Yes	Yes	No
Playmobil Pirates	Dreamcatcher	Dreamcatcher	December 17, 2009 (NA)	No	Yes	Yes	No
Playmobil Top Agents	Morgen Studios	Dreamcatcher	September 24, 2010 (EU)	No	No	Yes	No
Plop en de Pinguïn	Studio 100	Studio 100	2008 (PAL)	No	No	Yes	No
Plus belle la vie 2: le mysterieux passe de Vincent	Mindscape	Mindscape	October 19, 2009 (EU)	No	No	Yes	No
Plus belle la vie: Le secret du Dr Livia	Mindscape	Mindscape	October 10, 2008 (EU)	No	No	Yes	No
Plushees	Destineer	Destineer	April 11, 2008 (NA)	No	Yes	No	No
Pocket Book: My Personal Diary (Note: Primarily a diary and organiser application, though it includes unlockable mini-games such as Bilderchaos, in which players reassemble a picture.); Emma Mon Journal intime^{FR}	Tivola Publishing GmbH	Tivola Publishing GmbH	October 31, 2008 (EU)	No	Yes	No	No
Pocoyo Racing	SouthPeak Games	Zinkia	September 22, 2011 (EU)	No	No	Yes	No
Pogo Island	EA Games	EA Games	March 26, 2007 (NA)	No	Yes	Yes	No
Point Blank DS	Namco Bandai Games	Namco	May 18, 2006 (JP)	Yes	Yes	Yes	No
PokerDome: Poker Master	Mad Monkey Studio	Mindscape	March 19, 2008 (EU)	No	Yes	No	No
Pokémon Black	Game Freak	Nintendo	September 18, 2010 (JP)	Yes	Yes	Yes	Yes
Pokémon Black 2	Game Freak	Nintendo	June 23, 2012 (JP)	Yes	Yes	Yes	Yes
Pokémon Card Game: How To Play DS	Zener Works	The Pokémon Company	August 5, 2011 (JP)	Yes	No	No	No
Pokémon Conquest	Tecmo Koei	Nintendo	March 17, 2012 (JP)	Yes	Yes	Yes	Yes
Pokémon Dash	Ambrella	Nintendo	December 2, 2004 (JP)	Yes	Yes	Yes	Yes
Pokémon Diamond	Game Freak	Nintendo	September 28, 2006 (JP)	Yes	Yes	Yes	Yes
Pokémon HeartGold	Game Freak	Nintendo	September 12, 2009 (JP)	Yes	Yes	Yes	Yes
Pokémon Mystery Dungeon: Blue Rescue Team	ChunSoft	Nintendo	November 17, 2005 (JP)	Yes	Yes	Yes	Yes
Pokémon Mystery Dungeon: Explorers of Darkness	ChunSoft	Nintendo	September 13, 2007 (JP)	Yes	Yes	Yes	Yes
Pokémon Mystery Dungeon: Explorers of Sky	ChunSoft	Nintendo	April 18, 2009 (JP)	Yes	Yes	Yes	Yes
Pokémon Mystery Dungeon: Explorers of Time	ChunSoft	Nintendo	September 13, 2007 (JP)	Yes	Yes	Yes	Yes
Pokémon Pearl	Game Freak	Nintendo	September 28, 2006 (JP)	Yes	Yes	Yes	Yes
Pokémon Platinum	Game Freak	Nintendo	September 13, 2008 (JP)	Yes	Yes	Yes	Yes
Pokémon Ranger	HAL Laboratory	Nintendo	March 23, 2006 (JP)	Yes	Yes	Yes	Yes
Pokémon Ranger: Guardian Signs	Creatures	Nintendo	March 6, 2010 (JP)	Yes	Yes	Yes	Yes
Pokémon Ranger: Shadows of Almia	HAL Laboratory	Nintendo	March 20, 2008 (JP)	Yes	Yes	Yes	Yes
Pokémon SoulSilver	Game Freak	Nintendo	September 12, 2009 (JP)	Yes	Yes	Yes	Yes
Pokémon Trozei!	Genius Sonority	Nintendo	October 20, 2005 (JP)	Yes	Yes	Yes	Yes
Pokémon White	Game Freak	Nintendo	September 18, 2010 (JP)	Yes	Yes	Yes	Yes
Pokémon White 2	Game Freak	Nintendo	June 23, 2012 (JP)	Yes	Yes	Yes	Yes
Polar Bowler	Engine Software	MumboJumbo	October 7, 2008 (EU)	No	Yes	No	No
Polar Rampage	CyberPlanet Interactive	Phoenix Games	2009 (EU)	No	Yes	No	No
Polarium	Mitchell Corporation	Nintendo	December 2, 2004 (JP)	Yes	Yes	Yes	No
Pony Friends	Eidos Interactive	Eidos Interactive, Starfish SD	May 18, 2007 (PAL)	Yes	Yes	Yes	No
Pony Friends 2	Tantalus Media	Eidos Interactive, Square Enix	November 20, 2009 (PAL)	Yes	Yes	Yes	No
Pony Friends: Mini Breeds Edition	Eidos Interactive	Eidos Interactive	November 3, 2008 (NA)	No	Yes	No	No
Pony Life	Game Life	Deep Silver	June 30, 2009 (EU)	No	Yes	No	No
Pony LUV	Activision	Activision	October 2, 2006 (NA)	No	Yes	Yes	No
Pop Cutie! Street Fashion Simulation	Koei	Koei	April 24, 2008 (JP)	Yes	Yes	No	No
Pop Town; Pinky Street Kira Kira * Music Night^{JP}	HuneX	505 Games, Dimple Entertainment	December 20, 2007 (JP)	Yes	No	Yes	No
PopStars	Interactive Arts	SevenOne Intermedia	August 19, 2010 (EU)	No	Yes	No	No
Poptropica Adventures	Ubisoft	Ubisoft	November 6, 2012 (NA)	No	Yes	No	Yes
Populous DS	Electronic Arts	Electronic Arts, Rising Star Games, Xseed Games	February 21, 2008 (JP)	Yes	Yes	Yes	No
Post Pet DS: Yumemiru Momo to Fushigi no Pen	Alphadream Corporation	Marvelous Entertainment	December 24, 2009 (JP)	Yes	No	No	No
Postman Pat	Blast! Entertainment	Blast! Entertainment	March 14, 2008 (EU)	No	No	Yes	No
Postman Pat Special Delivery Service	Uacari	Avanquest	July 17, 2009 (EU)	No	No	Yes	No
Poupée Girl DS	Alvion	Alvion	December 17, 2009 (JP)	Yes	No	No	No
Poupée Girl DS 2: Elegant Mint Style	Alvion	Alvion	December 10, 2010 (JP)	Yes	No	No	No
Poupée Girl DS 2: Sweet Pink Style	Alvion	Alvion	December 10, 2010 (JP)	Yes	No	No	No
Power Play Pool	System 3	Conspiracy Entertainment, System 3	October 26, 2007 (NA)	No	Yes	Yes	No
Power Play Tennis	Codemasters	Codemasters	February 11, 2008 (NA)	No	Yes	No	No
Power Pocket Koushien	Konami	Konami	August 4, 2005 (JP)	Yes	No	No	No
Power Pro Kun Pocket 10	Konami	Konami	December 6, 2007 (JP)	Yes	No	No	No
Power Pro Kun Pocket 11	Konami	Konami	December 4, 2008 (JP)	Yes	No	No	No
Power Pro Kun Pocket 12	Konami	Konami	December 3, 2009 (JP)	Yes	No	No	No
Power Pro Kun Pocket 13	Konami	Konami	November 25, 2010 (JP)	Yes	No	No	No
Power Pro Kun Pocket 14	Konami	Konami	December 1, 2011 (JP)	Yes	No	No	No
Power Pro Kun Pocket 8	Konami	Konami	December 1, 2005 (JP)	Yes	No	No	No
Power Pro Kun Pocket 9	Konami	Konami	December 7, 2006 (JP)	Yes	No	No	No
Power Quiz: Allgemeinbildung	Radon Labs	HMH Hamburger Medien Haus	August 18, 2008 (EU)	No	No	Yes	No
Power Quiz: Die Sport-Edition DSF	Radon Labs	HMH Hamburger Medien Haus	June 9, 2009 (EU)	No	No	Yes	No
Power Quiz: GEOlino	Radon Labs	HMH Hamburger Medien Haus	June 9, 2009 (EU)	No	No	Yes	No
Power Rangers Samurai	Namco Bandai Games	Namco Bandai Games	November 22, 2011 (NA)	No	Yes	Yes	Yes
Power Rangers: Super Legends	Handheld Games	Disney Interactive Studios	October 23, 2007 (NA)	No	Yes	Yes	No
Powerbike	Tornado Studios	Majesco	April 24, 2009 (EU)	No	Yes	Yes	No
Powerful Golf	Konami	Konami	March 17, 2011 (JP)	Yes	No	No	No
Powershot Pinball Constructor	Involgamus	Oxygen Games	March 26, 2008 (PAL)	No	No	Yes	No
Press Your Luck	Ubisoft	Ubisoft	October 27, 2009 (NA)	No	Yes	No	No
Prey the Stars	Koei	Koei	September 25, 2008 (JP)	Yes	Yes	Yes	No
The Price Is Right	Ubisoft	Ubisoft	September 9, 2008 (NA)	No	Yes	No	No
The Price Is Right 2010	Ubisoft	Ubisoft	September 22, 2009 (NA)	No	Yes	No	No
Prince of Persia: The Fallen King	Ubisoft	Ubisoft	December 2, 2008 (NA)	No	Yes	Yes	No
Prince of Persia: The Forgotten Sands	Ubisoft	Ubisoft	May 10, 2010 (NA)	No	Yes	Yes	No
The Princess and the Frog	Griptonite Games	Disney Interactive Studios	November 17, 2009 (NA)	No	Yes	Yes	Yes
Princess Debut	Cave	Cave, Natsume Inc.	May 29, 2008 (JP)	Yes	Yes	No	No
Princess In Love	Engine Software	THQ	September 14, 2009 (NA)	No	Yes	Yes	No
Princess Isabella: A Witch's Curse	Gogii Games	Destineer	September 3, 2010 (NA)	No	Yes	Yes	Yes
Princess Lillifee's Magic Fairy; Prinzessin Lillifee: Feenzauber	Tivola	Tivola	August 24, 2007 (EU)	No	No	Yes	No
Princess Lillifee: My Dearest Friends	Tivola	Tivola	2009 (EU)	No	No	Yes	No
Princess Lillifee: My Wonderful World	Tivola	Tivola	2009 (EU)	No	No	Yes	No
Princess Maker 4 Special Edition	CyberFront	CyberFront	September 25, 2008 (JP)	Yes	No	No	No
Princess Natasha	Frame Studios Interactive	Destination Software	October 3, 2006 (NA,PAL)	No	Yes	Yes	No
Princess on Ice	Arc System Works	505 Games, Aksys Games, Arc System Works	April 25, 2008 (PAL)	Yes	Yes	Yes	No
Prism: Light the Way	Eidos Interactive	Eidos Interactive, Interchannel	October 17, 2007 (NA)	Yes	Yes	Yes	No
Pro Evolution Soccer 2008	Konami	Konami	October 25, 2007 (JP)	Yes	Yes	Yes	No
Pro Evolution Soccer 6 Winning Eleven: Pro Evolution Soccer 2007^{NA} World Soccer Winning Eleven DS^{JP}	Konami	Konami	October 25, 2007 (JP)	Yes	Yes	Yes	No
Pro Ninaru Mahjong DS	Affect	Success	November 24, 2005 (JP)	Yes	No	No	No
Pro Wrestling Kentei DS	Plenty	Plenty	March 25, 2010 (JP)	Yes	No	No	No
Pro Yakyuu Famista DS	Bandai Namco Games	Bandai Namco Games	November 25, 2007 (JP)	Yes	No	No	No
Pro Yakyuu Famista DS 2009	Bandai Namco Games	Bandai Namco Games	April 2, 2009 (JP)	Yes	No	No	No
Pro Yakyuu Famista DS 2010	Bandai Namco Games	Bandai Namco Games	March 25, 2010 (JP)	Yes	No	No	No
Pro Yakyuu Team o Tsukurou!	Sega	Sega	May 22, 2008 (JP)	Yes	No	No	No
Pro Yakyuu Team o Tsukurou! 2	Sega	Sega	May 21, 2009 (JP)	Yes	No	No	No
Professional Fisherman's Tour: Northern Hemisphere	UFO Interactive Games	505 Game Street, Starfish SD, Tommo	August 29, 2007 (NA)	Yes	Yes	Yes	No
Professor Brainium's Games	Bold Games	FrontLine Studios	March 31, 2008 (NA)	No	Yes	No	No
Professor Heinz Wolff's Gravity	Deep Silver	Deep Silver	November 28, 2008 (EU)	No	Yes	Yes	No
Professor Layton and the Curious Village	Level-5	Level-5, Nintendo	February 15, 2007 (JP)	Yes	Yes	Yes	Yes
Professor Layton and the Diabolical Box	Level-5	Level-5, Nintendo	November 29, 2007 (JP)	Yes	Yes	Yes	Yes
Professor Layton and the Last Specter	Level-5	Level-5, Nintendo	November 26, 2009 (JP)	Yes	Yes	Yes	Yes
Professor Layton and the Unwound Future	Level-5	Level-5, Nintendo	November 27, 2008 (JP)	Yes	Yes	Yes	Yes
The Professor's Brain Trainer: Logic; Shichida Shiki Training Unou Tanren Unotan DS: Shun Kan Shoubu! Handanryoku^{JP}	HuneX	Interchannel, 505 Games	February 9, 2007 (JP)	Yes	Yes	No	No
Project Hacker	Red Entertainment	Nintendo	July 13, 2006 (JP)	Yes	No	No	No
Pucca Power Up	Rising Star Games	UFO Interactive Games	December 9, 2010 (KR)	No	Yes	Yes	No
Puchi Eva: Evangelion @ Game	Bandai	Namco Bandai Games	March 20, 2008 (JP)	Yes	No	No	No
Puchi Puchi Virus	Jaleco Entertainment	Jaleco Entertainment, NIS America	July 5, 2007 (JP)	Yes	Yes	No	No
Puffins: Island Adventure	Other Ocean Interactive	Majesco	June 1, 2009 (NA)	No	Yes	No	No
Puppy Luv: Spa & Resort	Humagade	Activision	September 18, 2007 (NA)	No	Yes	Yes	No
Puppy Palace	Ubisoft	Ubisoft	February 5, 2008 (NA)	No	Yes	No	No
Purr Pals; Love Cat Liife^{JP}	Crave Entertainment	Crave Entertainment, THQ	March 27, 2007 (NA)	No	Yes	Yes	No
Pururun! Shizuku-chan Aha☆ DS Drill Kokugo (Note: Primarily an educational drill application for primary-school grades 1–3, with approximately 3,000 Japanese-language questions and progress rewards.)	Marvelous Entertainment	Marvelous Entertainment	July 31, 2008 (JP)	Yes	No	No	No
Pururun! Shizuku-chan Aha☆ DS Drill Sansuu (Note: Primarily an educational drill application for primary-school grades 1–3, with approximately 3,000 mathematics questions and progress rewards.)	Marvelous Entertainment	Marvelous Entertainment	July 31, 2008 (JP)	Yes	No	No	No
Pururun! Shizuku-Chan Meiro no Mori no Doubutu Tachi	Marvelous Entertainment	Marvelous Entertainment	July 12, 2007 (JP)	Yes	No	No	No
Puyo Pop Fever	Sonic Team	Sega, Atlus, Ignition Entertainment	December 24, 2004 (JP)	Yes	Yes	Yes	No
Puyo Puyo 7	Sonic Team, h.a.n.d.	Sega	July 30, 2009 (JP)	Yes	No	No	No
Puyo Puyo Fever 2	Sonic Team	Sega	December 24, 2005 (JP)	Yes	No	No	No
Puyo Puyo! 15th Anniversary	Sonic Team	Sega	December 14, 2006 (JP)	Yes	No	No	No
Puyo Puyo!! 20th Anniversary	Sonic Team	Sega	July 14, 2011 (JP)	Yes	No	No	No
Puzzle - Geo	Kritzelkratz	Tivola	March 3, 2009 (EU)	No	No	Yes	No
Puzzle Bobble DS	Taito Corporation	Taito Corporation	August 25, 2005 (JP)	Yes	No	No	No
Puzzle Chronicles	Konami	Konami	January 28, 2010 (NA)	No	Yes	Yes	No
Puzzle City	TechFront	Destineer	June 9, 2008 (NA)	No	Yes	No	No
Puzzle de Harvest Moon	Platinum Egg	Natsume Inc.	November 6, 2007 (NA)	No	Yes	No	No
Puzzle Expedition	MumboJumbo	MumboJumbo	November 9, 2010 (NA)	No	Yes	No	No
Puzzle Kingdoms	Infinitive Interactive	Zoo Digital Publishing	May 5, 2009 (NA)	No	Yes	Yes	No
Puzzle Mate: Crossword Mate	Compile Heart	Compile Heart	April 17, 2008 (JP)	Yes	No	No	No
Puzzle Mate: Nanpure Mate	Compile Heart	Compile Heart	April 17, 2008 (JP)	Yes	No	No	No
Puzzle Mate: Oekaki Mate	Compile Heart	Compile Heart	April 17, 2008 (JP)	Yes	No	No	No
Puzzle Pferdefreunde	Tivola	Tivola	May 17, 2010 (EU)	No	No	Yes	No
Puzzle Quest 2	1st Playable Productions	D3 Publisher	June 16, 2010 (PAL)	No	Yes	Yes	Yes
Puzzle Quest: Challenge of the Warlords	1st Playable Productions	D3 Publisher	March 16, 2007 (PAL)	Yes	Yes	Yes	No
Puzzle Quest: Galactrix	Infinitive Interactive	D3 Publisher	February 24, 2009 (NA)	No	Yes	Yes	No
Puzzle Series Vol. 10: Hitori ni Shitekure	Hudson Soft	Hudson Soft	March 8, 2007 (JP)	Yes	No	No	No
Puzzle Series Vol. 11: Nurikabe	Hudson Soft	Hudson Soft	March 8, 2007 (JP)	Yes	No	No	No
Puzzle Series Vol. 12: Akari	Hudson Soft	Hudson Soft	March 8, 2007 (JP)	Yes	No	No	No
Puzzle Series Vol. 13: Kanji Puzzle	Hudson Soft	Hudson Soft	March 29, 2007 (JP)	Yes	No	No	No
Puzzle Series Vol. 1: Jigsaw Puzzle	Hudson Soft	Hudson Soft	March 23, 2006 (JP)	Yes	No	No	No
Puzzle Series Vol. 2: Crossword	Hudson Soft	Hudson Soft	March 23, 2006 (JP)	Yes	No	No	No
Puzzle Series Vol. 3: Sudoku; Sudoku Gridmaster^{NA}	Hudson Soft	Hudson Soft	March 23, 2006 (JP)	Yes	Yes	Yes	No
Puzzle Series Vol. 4: Kakuro	Hudson Soft	Hudson Soft	August 10, 2006 (JP)	Yes	No	No	No
Puzzle Series Vol. 5: Slither Link	Hudson Soft	Hudson Soft	November 16, 2006 (JP)	Yes	No	No	No
Puzzle Series Vol. 6: Illust Logic	Hudson Soft	Hudson Soft	November 16, 2006 (JP)	Yes	No	No	No
Puzzle Series Vol. 7: Crossword 2	Hudson Soft	Hudson Soft	November 16, 2006 (JP)	Yes	No	No	No
Puzzle Series Vol. 8: Nankuro	Hudson Soft	Hudson Soft	December 14, 2006 (JP)	Yes	No	No	No
Puzzle Series Vol. 9: Sudoku 2 Deluxe	Hudson Soft	Hudson Soft	December 21, 2006 (JP)	Yes	No	No	No
Puzzle Series: Jigsaw Puzzle Koinu Mekuri Hen	Hudson Soft	Hudson Soft	August 3, 2006 (JP)	Yes	No	No	No
Puzzle Series: Jigsaw Puzzle Koneko Mekuri Hen	Hudson Soft	Hudson Soft	August 3, 2006 (JP)	Yes	No	No	No
Puzzle Series: Jigsaw Puzzle Oden-Kun	Hudson Soft	Hudson Soft	October 26, 2006 (JP)	Yes	No	No	No
Puzzle Series: Jigsaw Puzzle Oden-Kun 2	Hudson Soft	Hudson Soft	March 29, 2007 (JP)	Yes	No	No	No
Puzzle Time	Zoo Games	Zoo Games	June 23, 2010 (NA)	No	Yes	No	No
Puzzle: Horse Friends	Tivola	Tivola	2009 (EU)	No	No	Yes	No
Puzzle: Prinzessin Lillifee	Tivola	Tivola	2009 (EU)	No	No	Yes	No
Puzzle: Sightseeing	Kritzelkratz 3000	Tivola	June 15, 2009 (EU)	No	No	Yes	No
Puzzle: Tierbabys	Kritzelkratz 3000	Tivola	April 27, 2009 (EU)	No	No	Yes	No
Puzzle: Underwater	Kritzelkratz 3000	Tivola	June 15, 2009 (EU)	No	No	Yes	No
Puzzler Brain Games	Ideas Pad	Koch Media	April 19, 2013 (PAL)	No	Yes	Yes	No
Puzzler Collection	Route 1 Games	Ubisoft, Zoo Digital Publishing	August 1, 2008 (PAL)	No	Yes	Yes	No
Puzzler World	Ideas Pad	Ubisoft	September 30, 2009 (PAL)	No	Yes	Yes	Yes
Puzzler World 2 Puzzler World 2011^{NA}	Ideas Pad	Ubisoft	October 15, 2009 (PAL)	No	Yes	Yes	Yes
Puzzler World 2012	Ideas Pad	Ubisoft	December 16, 2011 (PAL)	No	No	Yes	No
Puzzler World 2013	Ideas Pad	Koch Media	November 30, 2012 (PAL)	No	No	Yes	No

== Applications ==
There are 477 applications included in the list.

Title	Developer(s)	Publisher(s)	First released	JP	NA	EU	AU
Jam Sessions	Plato	Plato, Ubisoft	February 1, 2007 (JP)	Yes	Yes	Yes	No
Jillian Michaels' Fitness Ultimatum 2010	3G Studios	Majesco	October 20, 2009 (NA)	No	Yes	No	No
Jinsei 8-Man-7000-Kai no Shokuji wo Tanoshiku suru	h.a.n.d. Inc.	Square Enix	December 13, 2007 (JP)	Yes	No	No	No
Jishin DS: 72 Jikan	Jupiter Corporation	Iota	June 25, 2009 (JP)	Yes	No	No	No
Josei no Hinkakujuku DS	PHP Interface	PHP Interface	October 23, 2008 (JP)	Yes	No	No	No
Junior Classic Books & Fairytales	Navarre Corp	Navarre Corp	August 3, 2010 (JP)	Yes	No	Yes	No
Just in Time Translations	CyberPlanet Interactive	THQ	September 21, 2009 (NA)	No	Yes	No	No
Kado-Chan Shiki Doko Demo Kin Trai-Navi	Dorasu	Dorasu	July 5, 2007 (JP)	Yes	No	No	No
Kagaku DS	IE Institute	IE Institute	December 21, 2006 (JP)	Yes	No	No	No
Kageyama Hideo no Hanpuku Ondoku DS Eigo	IE Institute	IE Institute	November 27, 2008 (JP)	Yes	No	No	No
Kaibou Seirigaku DS	Medika Shuppan	Medika Shuppan	January 1, 2011 (JP)	Yes	No	No	No
Kaigo Navi DS	Voltec	Voltec	June 2, 2011 (JP)	Yes	No	No	No
Kaiun Kenkyuuka - Utsukita Mahiro Kanshuu - Mainichi Kokorobics: DS Uranai Happiness 2008	Studio Trico	Dimple Entertainment	January 31, 2008 (JP)	Yes	No	No	No
Kakikomi Shiki 'Hannya Shingyou' Renshuu Chou	IE Institute	IE Institute	April 12, 2007 (JP)	Yes	No	No	No
Kanji Sonomama DS Rakubiki Jiten	Nintendo	Nintendo	April 13, 2006 (JP)	Yes	No	No	No
Kantan! Tanoshii! Okashi Navi DS	Paon Corporation	Koei	March 13, 2008 (JP)	Yes	No	No	No
Karada Support Kenkyuujo: Tounyoubyou Hen	ARKRAY	ARKRAY	October 1, 2008 (JP)	Yes	No	No	No
Karasawa Shunichi no Zettai ni Ukeru!! Zatsugakuen DS	Takara Tomy	Takara Tomy	March 8, 2007 (JP)	Yes	No	No	No
Katei no Igaku: DS de Kitaeru Shokuzai Kenkou Training	Rocket Company	Rocket Company	November 8, 2007 (JP)	Yes	No	No	No
Kazoku Minna de Nippon Shiatsu Shikai Kanshuu: RakuRaku Shiatsu Navi	Dorart	Dorart	August 30, 2007 (JP)	Yes	No	No	No
Keiba Navi: Uma no Suke	Starfish	Starfish	December 14, 2006 (JP)	Yes	No	No	No
Keiba Navi: Uma no Suke 2	Starfish SD	Starfish SD	October 25, 2007 (JP)	Yes	No	No	No
Kenkou Kentei	Yudo	Yudo	November 15, 2007 (JP)	Yes	No	No	No
Kenkou Ouen Recipe 1000: DS Kondate Zenshuu	Nintendo	Nintendo	December 7, 2006 (JP)	Yes	No	No	No
Kikutan DS Advanced	Success	Success	March 8, 2007 (JP)	Yes	No	No	No
Kikutan DS Basic	Success	Success	March 8, 2007 (JP)	Yes	No	No	No
Kirihara Shoten Forest: Eigo @ DS	Ertain	Ertain	March 26, 2008 (JP)	Yes	No	No	No
Kirihara Shoten Kanshuu: Daigakusei Ryoku Kentei DS	ASK	ASK	December 4, 2008 (JP)	Yes	No	No	No
Kobun Kanbun DS	IE Institute	IE Institute	November 5, 2009 (JP)	Yes	No	No	No
Kodomo no Tame no Yomi Kikase: Ehon de Asobou 1-Kan; I Did It Mum! Picture Book^{EU}	Starfish	Starfish	July 6, 2006 (JP)	Yes	No	Yes	No
Kodomo no Tame no Yomi Kikase: Ehon de Asobou 2-Kan	Starfish	Starfish	July 6, 2006 (JP)	Yes	No	No	No
Kodomo no Tame no Yomi Kikase: Ehon de Asobou 3-Kan	Starfish	Starfish	July 6, 2006 (JP)	Yes	No	No	No
Kodomo no Tame no Yomi Kikase: Ehon de Asobou 5-Kan	Starfish	Starfish	October 19, 2006 (JP)	Yes	No	No	No
Koe de Asobou: Heart Catch PreCure!	Toei Animation	Toei Animation	November 11, 2010 (JP)	Yes	No	No	No
Koharu no DS Uchigohan. Shokuji Balance Guide Tsuki	OeRSTED	Comolink	October 4, 2007 (JP)	Yes	No	No	No
Kokoro ni Shimiru: Mouhitsu de Kaku - Aida Mitsuo DS	New	Ertain	November 30, 2006 (JP)	Yes	No	No	No
Korede Haji o Kakanai: Ashita Tsukaeru DS Business Manner	Genki	Genki	April 26, 2007 (JP)	Yes	No	No	No
KORG DS-10 Plus	Cavia	AQ Interactive, Xseed Games	September 17, 2009 (JP)	Yes	Yes	No	No
KORG DS-10 Synthesizer	Cavia	AQ Interactive, Nintendo Australia, Xseed Games	July 24, 2008 (JP)	Yes	Yes	Yes	Yes
KORG M01	DETUNE	DETUNE	December 3, 2010 (JP)	Yes	No	No	No
Kouchan no Shiawase! Kantan! Oryouri Recipe!	fonfun	fonfun	April 3, 2008 (JP)	Yes	No	No	No
Kuma no Pooh-san: 100 Acre no Mori no Cooking Book	Good-Feel	Disney Interactive Studios	September 15, 2011 (JP)	Yes	No	No	No
Kuruma de DS	Nintendo	Nintendo	July 9, 2012 (JP)	Yes	No	No	No
Kyou Kara DS Calorie Navi	Opera House	IE Institute	July 5, 2007 (JP)	Yes	No	No	No
Langenscheidt Basic Woerterbuch Englisch	Deep Silver	Deep Silver	2008 (EU)	No	No	Yes	No
Langenscheidt VokabelStar Englisch Fur Einsteiger	Radon Labs	Deep Silver	December 18, 2009 (EU)	No	No	Yes	No
Langenscheidt VokabelStar Englisch Fur Fortgeschrittene; VocabStar English Advanced^{UK}	Radon Labs	Deep Silver	July 30, 2009 (EU)	No	No	Yes	No
Le Bescherelle Pratique	Mindscape	Mindscape	June 26, 2009 (EU)	No	No	Yes	No
Lernerfolg Grundschule Musik - Little Amadeus	Tivola	Tivola	September 6, 2010 (EU)	No	No	Yes	No
Lernerfolg Grundschule: Deutsch - Der Rechtschreibtrainer	Tivola	Tivola	2008 (EU)	No	No	Yes	No
Lernerfolg Grundschule: Deutsch - Der Rechtschreibtrainer Neue Version	Tivola	Tivola	2008 (EU)	No	No	Yes	No
Lernerfolg Grundschule: Deutsch, Klasse 1+2	Tivola	Tivola	2008 (EU)	No	No	Yes	No
Lernerfolg Grundschule: Deutsch, Klasse 3+4	Tivola	Tivola	2008 (EU)	No	No	Yes	No
Lernerfolg Grundschule: Englisch - Der Vokabeltrainer	Tivola	Tivola	2008 (EU)	No	No	Yes	No
Lernerfolg Grundschule: Englisch - Der Vokabeltrainer Neue Version	Tivola	Tivola	2008 (EU)	No	No	Yes	No
Lernerfolg Grundschule: Konzentration - Der Aufmerksamkeitstrainer	Tivola	Tivola	2008 (EU)	No	No	Yes	No
Lernerfolg Grundschule: Mathematik Intensiv - Klasse 1-4	Tivola	Tivola	2008 (EU)	No	No	Yes	No
Lernerfolg Vorschule: Capt'n Sharky	Tivola	Tivola	2008 (EU)	No	No	Yes	No
Lernerfolg Vorschule: Lernerfolg Vorschule - Prinzessin Lillifee	Tivola	Tivola	2008 (EU)	No	No	Yes	No
Les Incollables CE1-CE2	Mindscape	Mindscape	March 19, 2008 (EU)	No	No	Yes	No
Les Incollables CM1-CM2	Mindscape	Mindscape	March 19, 2008 (EU)	No	No	Yes	No
Les Incollables CP	Mindscape	Mindscape	March 19, 2008 (EU)	No	No	Yes	No
Let's Pilates	Vanpool	Konami	December 20, 2007 (JP)	Yes	Yes	No	No
Let's Yoga	Vanpool	Konami	July 5, 2007 (JP)	Yes	Yes	Yes	No
Mainichi ga Tanoshii! Ayakouji Kimimaro no Happy Techou	Dorasu	Dorart	October 25, 2007 (JP)	Yes	No	No	No
Mainichi Shinbunsha Kyouruoku: Saikyou no Kanji Drill 5-Man Mon	Mainichi Communications	Mainichi Communications	January 15, 2009 (JP)	Yes	No	No	No
Mainichi Suteki! Hello Kitty no Life Kit	Dorasu	Dorart	September 13, 2007 (JP)	Yes	No	No	No
Manepa 1000-Bannin no FX Training: Leverage Kisei Taiouban	Genki	Genki	September 16, 2010 (JP)	Yes	No	No	No
Manepa 1000-Mannin no FX Training	Genki	Genki	June 4, 2009 (JP)	Yes	No	No	No
Maru Goukaku Shikaku Dasshu! 2011-Nendo-ban Takken Shiken	Media5	Media5	March 3, 2011 (JP)	Yes	No	No	No
Maru Goukaku: Shikaku Dasshu! 2011-Nendohan - Gyouseishoshi Shiken	Media5	Media5	April 7, 2011 (JP)	Yes	No	No	No
Maru Goukaku: Shikaku Dasshu! 2011-Nendohan Financial Planner Ginou Kentei Shiken 2-Kyuu 3-Kyuu	Media5	Media5	June 23, 2011 (JP)	Yes	No	No	No
Maru Goukaku: Shikaku Dasshu! 2011-Nendohan Jouhou Security Specialist Shiken - Network Specialist Shiken	Media5	Media5	May 26, 2011 (JP)	Yes	No	No	No
Maru Goukaku: Shikaku Dasshu! Care Manager Shiken	Media5	Media5	October 21, 2010 (JP)	Yes	No	No	No
Maru Goukaku: Shikaku Dasshu! Chuushoukigyou Shindanshi Shikenn	Media5	Media5	September 2, 2011 (JP)	Yes	No	No	No
Maru Goukaku: Shikaku Dasshu! Financial Planning Ginou Kentei Shiken 2-Kyuu 3-Kyuu	Media5	Media5	June 24, 2010 (JP)	Yes	No	No	No
Maru Goukaku: Shikaku Dasshu! Gyouseishoshi Shiken	Media5	Media5	June 10, 2010 (JP)	Yes	No	No	No
Maru Goukaku: Shikaku Dasshu! Hanbaishi Kentei Shiken 2-Kyuu 3-Kyuu	Media5	Media5	October 7, 2010 (JP)	Yes	No	No	No
Maru Goukaku: Shikaku Dasshu! Kaigo Fukushisi Shiken	Media5	Media5	August 18, 2011 (JP)	Yes	No	No	No
Maru Goukaku: Shikaku Dasshu! Passport Shiken - Kihon Jouhou Gijutsusha Shiken	Media5	Media5	January 26, 2012 (JP)	Yes	No	No	No
Maru Goukaku: Shikaku Dasshu! Shakaifukushi Samurai Shiken	Media5	Media5	July 21, 2011 (JP)	Yes	No	No	No
Maru Goukaku: Shikaku Dasshu! Sharoshi Shiken	Media5	Media5	December 16, 2010 (JP)	Yes	No	No	No
Maru Goukaku: Shikaku Dasshu! Shouken Gaimuin Ni-Shu Shiken	Media5	Media5	December 16, 2010 (JP)	Yes	No	No	No
Maru Goukaku: Shikaku Dasshu! Special Kaigo Fukushishi Shiken	Media5	Media5	September 6, 2012 (JP)	Yes	No	No	No
Maru Goukaku: Shikaku Dasshu! Special Shakai Fukushishi Shiken	Media5	Media5	August 2, 2012 (JP)	Yes	No	No	No
Maru Goukaku: Shikaku Dasshu! Special Sharoushi Shiken - Goukaku Hoshou Han	Media5	Media5	December 22, 2011 (JP)	Yes	No	No	No
Maru Goukaku: Shikaku Dasshu! Special Takken Shiken	Media5	Media5	June 14, 2012 (JP)	Yes	No	No	No
Maru Goukaku: Shikaku Dasshu! TAC Koumuin Shiken	Media5	Media5	November 25, 2010 (JP)	Yes	No	No	No
Maru Goukaku: Shiraku Sashhu! IT Passport Shiken	Media5	Media5	January 14, 2010 (JP)	Yes	No	No	No
Maru Kaite DonDon Oboeru: Kyoui no Tsugawa Shiki Kanji Kioku Jutsu	Ertain	Ertain	June 28, 2007 (JP)	Yes	No	No	No
Maru Kaite DonDon Oboeru: Kyoui no Tsugawa Shiki Kanji Kioku Jutsu - Kiso Gakushuu Hen	Ertain	Ertain	December 6, 2007 (JP)	Yes	No	No	No
Maruhan Pachinko & Pachi-Slot Hisshou Guide Kanshuu: The Pachinko Hall	Nippon Ichi Software	Nippon Ichi Software	June 25, 2009 (JP)	Yes	No	No	No
Mathematik 1-4. Klasse 2012	Franzis Verlag	Franzis Verlag	2011 (EU)	No	No	Yes	No
Mathematik 1.-4. Klasse: Fit fürs Gymnasium	Franzis Verlag	Franzis Verlag	2011 (EU)	No	No	Yes	No
Mathematik und Deutsch 1.-4. Klasse 2013	Franzis Verlag	Franzis Verlag	2012 (EU)	No	No	Yes	No
Mathematik und Deutsch 1.-4. Klasse 2014	Franzis Verlag	Franzis Verlag	2012 (EU)	No	No	Yes	No
Maths Made Simple; Zennou Series Vol. 02: Sakurai Susumu Sensei Kanshuu - Indo Shiki Keisan Zennou Drill^{JP}	ASK	505 Games; ASK^{JP}	February 14, 2008 (JP)	Yes	No	Yes	Yes
Me de Unou o Kitaeru: DS Sokudoku Junior	MileStone Inc.	MileStone Inc.	August 30, 2007 (JP)	Yes	No	No	No
Me de Unou o Kitaeru: DS Sokudoku Jutsu	MileStone Inc.	MileStone Inc.	November 9, 2006 (JP)	Yes	No	No	No
Mensetsu no Tatsujin: Tenshoku-Hen	Success	Success	October 25, 2007 (JP)	Yes	No	No	No
Methode Boscher: La Journee des Tout Petits	Gimagin Games	Atari SA	December 16, 2008 (EU)	No	No	Yes	No
Mezase! Shoujo Manga Ka! Chao Manga School	TDK Core	TDK Core	November 9, 2006 (JP)	Yes	No	No	No
Minagara Oreru DS Origami	TDK Core	TDK Core	August 9, 2007 (JP)	Yes	No	No	No
Mind. Body. Soul.: Nutrition Matters	MileStone Inc.	505 Games	May 22, 2009 (JP)	No	No	Yes	No
Minna de Dokusho DS Naruhodo! Tanoshii Seikatsu no Urawaza Inwaza	Dorasu	Dorart	March 20, 2010 (JP)	Yes	No	No	No
Minna de Dokusho DS: Keetai Shousetsu Desuu	Dorasu	Dorart	December 25, 2008 (JP)	Yes	No	No	No
Minna de Jibun no Setsumeisho: B-Kata, A-Kata, AB-Kata, O-Kata	ScriptArts	GungHo	December 30, 2008 (JP)	Yes	No	No	No
Minna de Shitendo DS: Genji Monogatari + Chottodake Bungaku	Dorasu	Dorart	June 19, 2008 (JP)	Yes	No	No	No
Minna de Shitendo DS: Hanshichi Yuumon & Ango & Ago Juurou & Hatamoto Taikutsu Otoko	Dorasu	Dorart	June 19, 2008 (JP)	Yes	No	No	No
Minna de Taikan Dokusho DS: Cho-Kowai! Gakkou no Kaidan	Dorasu	Dorart	August 19, 2010 (JP)	Yes	No	No	No
Mitamekara Yomigaeru: Otona no Kikonashi Training	Success	Success	April 3, 2008 (JP)	Yes	No	No	No
Mokushise! Zenko Kutaikai!! Let's! Brass!!	MileStone Inc.	MileStone Inc.	April 24, 2008 (JP)	Yes	No	No	No
Mondai na Nihongo	Hudson Soft	Hudson Soft	September 6, 2007 (JP)	Yes	No	No	No
Mosmallineun 3 Gongjuwa Hamkkehaneun Geulim-yeonsang Yeongdan-eo Amgibeob	Daewon Media	Daewon Media	May 20, 2010 (KR)	Yes	No	No	No
Motto Me de Unou o Kitaeru DS: Sokudoku Jutsu	MileStone Inc.	MileStone Inc.	July 31, 2008 (JP)	Yes	No	No	No
Motto TOEIC Test DS Training	IE Institute	IE Institute	June 12, 2008 (JP)	Yes	No	No	No
Moxie Girlz	1st Playable Productions	GameMill Publishing	October 18, 2011 (NA)	No	Yes	No	No
My Dress-Up	Oxygen Games	Oxygen Games	October 11, 2008 (PAL)	No	Yes	Yes	No
My Fun Facts Coach	Ubisoft	Ubisoft	December 2, 2008 (NA)	No	Yes	No	No
My Healthy Cooking Coach	Ubisoft	Ubisoft	June 23, 2009 (NA)	No	Yes	Yes	Yes
My Make-Up	Oxygen Games	Oxygen Games	October 21, 2008 (PAL)	No	Yes	Yes	No
My Reading Tutor	1st Playable Productions	Mentor Interactive	March 23, 2010 (NA)	No	Yes	No	No
My SAT Coach	Ubisoft Montreal	Ubisoft	September 23, 2008 (NA)	No	Yes	No	No
My Weight Loss Coach	Ubisoft Montreal	Ubisoft	June 20, 2008 (PAL)	No	Yes	Yes	No
Nakamura Sumiko Tettei Shidou: Shin TOEIC Test Ichinichi Ippun DS Lesson	Rocket Company	Rocket Company	October 2, 2008 (JP)	Yes	No	No	No
Nanami no Oshiete Eibunpou DS: Kisokara Manabu Step Up Gakushuu	Media5	Media5	June 30, 2011 (JP)	Yes	No	No	No
Nanami no Oshiete English DS: Mezase TOEIC Master	Media5	Media5	March 26, 2011 (JP)	Yes	No	No	No
Nandoku Kanji DS: Nandoku - Yojijukugo - Koji Kotowaza	Spike	Spike	June 6, 2008 (JP)	Yes	No	No	No
Nathan Entrainement 6E	Mindscape	Mindscape	May 7, 2009 (EU)	No	No	Yes	No
Nathan Entrainement CE1	Mindscape	Mindscape	May 7, 2009 (EU)	No	No	Yes	No
Nathan Entrainement CE2	Mindscape	Mindscape	May 7, 2009 (EU)	No	No	Yes	No
Nathan Entrainement CM1	Mindscape	Mindscape	May 7, 2009 (EU)	No	No	Yes	No
Nathan Entrainement CM2	Mindscape	Mindscape	May 7, 2009 (EU)	No	No	Yes	No
Nazotte Oboeru Otona no Kanji Renshuu	Now Production	Now Production	December 21, 2006 (JP)	Yes	No	No	No
Nazotte Oboeru Otona no Kanji Renshuu Kaitei-ban	Now Production	Now Production	February 25, 2010 (JP)	Yes	No	No	No
Nazotte Oboeru Otona no Kanji Renshuu Kanzen-ban	Now Production	Now Production	November 22, 2007 (JP)	Yes	No	No	No
New Chuugaku Eitango Target 1800 DS	IE Institute	IE Institute	January 22, 2009 (JP)	Yes	No	No	No
New Eitango Target 1900 DS	IE Institute	IE Institute	August 9, 2007 (JP)	Yes	No	No	No
New Shikakui Atama o Maru Kusuru DS	IE Institute	IE Institute	April 2, 2009 (JP)	Yes	No	No	No
Nihon Keizai Shinbunsha Kanshuu: Shiranai Mamade wa Son o Suru Mono ya Okane no Shikumi DS	Nintendo	Nintendo	August 27, 2009 (JP)	Yes	No	No	No
Nihongo de Asobo DS	IE Institute	IE Institute	October 9, 2008 (JP)	Yes	No	No	No
Nihongo Kentei DS	Paon Corporation	Paon Corporation	April 24, 2008 (JP)	Yes	No	No	No
Nihonshi DS	IE Institute	IE Institute	November 12, 2009 (JP)	Yes	No	No	No
Nintendo DS & DSi Browser	Nintendo	Nintendo	July 24, 2006 (JP)	Yes	Yes	Yes	Yes
Nintendo MP3 Player; Play-Yan^{JP}	Nintendo	Nintendo	September 14, 2005 (JP)	Yes	Yes	Yes	Yes
Nippon no Rekishi DS	IE Institute	IE Institute	September 21, 2006 (JP)	Yes	No	No	No
Nippon Shuzan Renmei Kanshuu: Itsudemo Soroban DS	Suzak	Four Winds	June 19, 2008 (JP)	Yes	No	No	No
Nippon Suugaku Kentei Kyoukai Kounin: Suuken DS - Otona ga Tokenai!? Kodomo no Sansuu	Rocket Company	Rocket Company	April 24, 2008 (JP)	Yes	No	No	No
Obunsha Deru-jun Chiri DS	IE Institute	IE Institute	May 31, 2007 (JP)	Yes	No	No	No
Obunsha Deru-jun Kokugo DS	IE Institute	IE Institute	May 31, 2007 (JP)	Yes	No	No	No
Oishinbo: DS Recipe Shuu	Bandai Namco Games	Bandai Namco Games	March 8, 2007 (JP)	Yes	No	No	No
Okada Toshio no Itsumademo DEBU to Omounayo: DS Recording Diet	Rocket Company	Rocket Company	November 20, 2008 (JP)	Yes	No	No	No
Osumitsuki Series: Matsuda Tadanori Onsen Kyouju Kanshuu - Zenkoku DokoDemo Onsen Techou	Marvelous Entertainment	Marvelous Entertainment	October 11, 2007 (JP)	Yes	No	No	No
Osumitsuki Series: Shokusai Roman Katei de Dekiru! Chomeijin - Yuumei Ryourinin no Original Recipe	Marvelous Entertainment	Marvelous Entertainment	October 11, 2007 (JP)	Yes	No	No	No
Otona no Joushikiryoku Training DS	HAL Labs	Nintendo	October 26, 2006 (JP)	Yes	No	No	No
Otona no Onnaryoku Kentei	Konami	Konami	June 28, 2007 (JP)	Yes	No	No	No
Otona no Renai Shousetsu DS: Harlequin Selection	Genius Sonority Inc.	Nintendo	February 25, 2010 (JP)	Yes	No	No	No
Otona Ryoku Kentei	Konami	Konami	March 8, 2007 (JP)	Yes	No	No	No
Oubunsha Deru-Jun: Koumin DS	IE Institute	IE Institute	October 11, 2007 (JP)	Yes	No	No	No
Oubunsha Deru-Jun: Rekishi DS	IE Institute	IE Institute	August 13, 2009 (JP)	Yes	No	No	No
Oubunsha Deru-Jun: Rika DS	IE Institute	IE Institute	August 13, 2009 (JP)	Yes	No	No	No
Oubunsha Deru-Jun: Sansuu DS	IE Institute	IE Institute	October 11, 2007 (JP)	Yes	No	No	No
Pachi & Slot Hisshoubon DS	Dorart	Dorart	May 26, 2009 (JP)	Yes	No	No	No
Pass Your Driving Theory Test; Pass Your Driving Theory Test: 2010 Edition	GSP Publishing	GSP Publishing	2009 (PAL)	No	No	Yes	No
Patto Tokueru: Indo Suugaku Drill	MegaHouse	MegaHouse	February 7, 2008 (JP)	Yes	No	No	No
Personal Trainer: Cooking	Nintendo	Nintendo	June 20, 2008 (EU)	Yes	Yes	Yes	No
Personal Trainer: Math	Jupiter	Shogakukan, Nintendo	January 13, 2007 (JP)	Yes	Yes	Yes	No
Personal Trainer: Walking	Creatures Inc.	Nintendo	November 1, 2008 (JP)	Yes	Yes	Yes	No
PictoChat	Nintendo	Nintendo	November 21, 2004 (US)	Yes	Yes	Yes	Yes
Picture Perfect Hair Salon	505 Games	505 Games	December 1, 2009 (EU)	No	Yes	Yes	No
Pocket Chikyuugi DS: Sawatte Tanoshimu Jinrui 5000 Toshi no Ayumi	Mycom	Mainichi Communications	April 9, 2009 (JP)	Yes	No	No	No
Practise English! Eigo ga Nigate na Otona no DS Training: Motto Eigo Duke^{JP}	Plato	Nintendo	March 29, 2007 (PAL)	Yes	No	Yes	No

== Bundles ==
There are 42 games included in the list.

Title	Developer(s)	Publisher(s)	First released	JP	NA	EU	AU
Jewel Link Double Pack: Atlantic Quest / Galactic Quest	Avanquest Software	Avanquest Software	May 30, 2014 (EU)	No	No	Yes	No
Jewel Master 3in1	Cerasus Media	rondomedia	August 26, 2011 (EU)	No	No	Yes	No
Jewel Master Collection	Storm City Games	Storm City Games	September 27, 2011 (NA)	No	Yes	No	No
Jewel Quest Mysteries	Activision	Activision	November 30, 2009 (NA)	No	Yes	Yes	No
Kids Learn & Play: Pets & Vets Bundle	Talking Stick Games	Talking Stick Games	December 10, 2012 (NA)	No	Yes	Yes	No
Kids Learn Bundle: Math / Spelling and Grammar	Talking Stick Games	Talking Stick Games	March 11, 2013 (NA)	No	Yes	No	No
Lernerfolg Grundschule: Deutsch - Klasse 1-4	Tivola	Tivola	2008 (EU)	No	No	Yes	No
Legacy of Ys: Books I & II	Interchannel	DHM Interactive, Interchannel	March 20, 2008 (JP)	Yes	Yes	No	No
LEGO 3-Pack DS Bundle	LucasArts	LucasArts	February 18, 2011 (NA)	No	Yes	No	No
Little League World Series Baseball: Double Play	Activision	Activision	July 13, 2010 (NA)	No	Yes	Yes	Yes
Mama's Combo Pack: Volume 1	Cooking Mama Limited	Majesco	August 14, 2012 (NA)	No	Yes	Yes	Yes
Mama's Combo Pack: Volume 2	Cooking Mama Limited	Majesco	August 14, 2012 (NA)	No	Yes	Yes	Yes
Mega Brain Boost	Interchannel	Majesco	January 22, 2008 (NA)	No	Yes	No	No
My Amusement Park and Digging for Dinosaurs Game Pack	Scholastic, Inc.	Scholastic, Inc.	July 14, 2012 (NA)	No	Yes	No	No
Pinkalicious/Silverlicious 2-Pack	GameMill Publishing	GameMill Publishing	October 25, 2013 (NA)	No	Yes	No	No
The Price Is Right / Rayman Raving Rabbids	Ubisoft	Ubisoft	March 18, 2009 (NA)	No	Yes	No	No
Prinzessin Lillifee Spielesammlung	Tivola	Tivola	January 8, 2012 (EU)	No	No	Yes	No

== Other ==
Title	Developer(s)	Publisher(s)	First released	JP	NA	EU	AU
Metroid Prime Hunters: First Hunt (Demo)	Nintendo Software Technology, Retro Studios	Nintendo	November 21, 2004 (NA)	No	Yes	Yes	No
PokePark: Fishing Rally DS	The Pokémon Company	Nintendo	May 10, 2010 (JP)	Yes	No	No	No

== See also ==
- List of DSiWare games and applications
- List of Game Boy games
- List of Game Boy Advance games
- List of Game Boy Color games
- List of Nintendo DS Wi-Fi Connection games
- List of Wii games
- Lists of video games
