= 2009 in video games =

2009 saw many new installments in established video game franchises, such as Assassin's Creed II, Call of Duty: Modern Warfare 2, Uncharted 2: Among Thieves, Wii Sports Resort, New Super Mario Bros. Wii, Resident Evil 5, Left 4 Dead 2, Forza Motorsport 3, The Beatles: Rock Band, The Sims 3, Madden NFL 10, NBA 2K10, and FIFA 10. New intellectual properties include Batman: Arkham Asylum, Bayonetta, Borderlands, Demon's Souls, Dragon Age: Origins, Infamous, Just Dance, Minecraft, Plants vs. Zombies, and Prototype.

== Legend ==
Video game platforms
Bada	Bada	BBOS	BlackBerry OS family, including BlackBerry Tablet OS and BlackBerry 10	DROID	Android
DS	Nintendo DS, DSiWare, iQue DS	iOS	iOS, iPhone, iPod, iPadOS, iPad, visionOS, Apple Vision Pro	LIN	Linux, SteamOS
MAC	Classic Mac OS, 2001 and before	OSX	macOS	PS2	PlayStation 2
PS3	PlayStation 3	PSN	PlayStation Network	PSP	PlayStation Portable
PSV	PlayStation Vita	Wii	Wii, WiiWare, Wii Virtual Console	WIN	Windows, all versions Windows 95 and up
WP	Windows Phone	XB360	Xbox 360, Xbox 360 Live Arcade		

== Financial performance ==
=== Best-selling games ===
The following are the top ten best-selling games of 2009 in terms of worldwide retail sales.

Rank	Title	Sales	Publisher	Platform(s)	Ref.
1	Wii Sports	20,180,000	Nintendo	Wii	(Note: Wii Sports sales in 2009: January–March – 5.2 million; April–December – 14.98 million)
2	Wii Sports Resort	13,580,000	Nintendo	Wii	
3	Call of Duty: Modern Warfare 2	11,860,000	Activision Blizzard	PS3, XB360, WIN	
4	New Super Mario Bros. Wii	10,550,000	Nintendo	Wii	
5	Wii Fit Plus	10,160,000	Nintendo	Wii	
6	Wii Fit	8,590,000	Nintendo	Wii	(Note: Wii Fit sales in 2009: January–March – 4.21 million; April–December – 4.38 million)
7	Mario Kart Wii	7,550,000	Nintendo	Wii	(Note: Mario Kart Wii sales in 2009: January–March – 1.73 million; April–December – 5.82 million)
8	Assassin's Creed II	6,000,000	Ubisoft	PS3, XB360	
9	Wii Play	5,800,000	Nintendo	Wii	(Note: Wii Play sales in 2009: January–March – 2.07 million; April–December – 3.73 million)
10	Resident Evil 5	5,200,000	Capcom	PS3, XB360	

== Top-rated games ==
=== Critically acclaimed games ===
Metacritic (MC) and GameRankings (GR) are aggregators of video game journalism reviews.

2009 games and expansions scoring at least 88/100 (MC) or 87.5% (GR)
Game	Publisher	Release Date	Platform	MC score	GR score
Uncharted 2: Among Thieves	Sony Computer Entertainment	October 13, 2009	PS3	96/100	96.43%
Fallout 3: Game of the Year Edition	Bethesda Softworks	October 13, 2009	PS3	N/A	95.4%
LittleBigPlanet: Game of the Year Edition	Sony Computer Entertainment	September 8, 2009	PS3	N/A	94.57%
Street Fighter IV	Capcom	February 12, 2009	PS3	94/100	93.64%
Call of Duty: Modern Warfare 2	Activision	November 10, 2009	XB360	94/100	93.57%
Call of Duty: Modern Warfare 2	Activision	November 10, 2009	PS3	94/100	93.42%
Street Fighter IV	Capcom	February 12, 2009	XB360	93/100	93.23%
Braid	Number None	November 12, 2009	PS3	93/100	93.11%
Minecraft	Mojang	May 17, 2009	WIN	93/100	92.79%
Grand Theft Auto: Chinatown Wars	Rockstar Games	March 17, 2009	DS	93/100	92.71%
Metroid Prime: Trilogy	Nintendo	August 24, 2009	Wii	91/100	92.35%
Batman: Arkham Asylum	Eidos Interactive	August 25, 2009	XB360	92/100	92.34%
Forza Motorsport 3	Microsoft Game Studios	October 27, 2009	XB360	92/100	92.26%
Batman: Arkham Asylum	Eidos Interactive	August 25, 2009	PS3	91/100	92.07%
Batman: Arkham Asylum	Eidos Interactive	September 15, 2009	WIN	91/100	91.79%
Grand Theft Auto: Episodes from Liberty City	Rockstar Games	October 29, 2009	XB360	N/A	91.41%
Mario & Luigi: Bowser's Inside Story	Nintendo	February 11, 2009	DS	90/100	91.01%
God of War Collection	Sony Computer Entertainment	November 17, 2009	PS3	91/100	90.78%
Assassin's Creed II	Ubisoft	November 17, 2009	PS3	91/100	90.71%
Dragon Age: Origins	Electronic Arts	November 3, 2009	WIN	91/100	90.63%
Killzone 2	Sony Computer Entertainment	February 26, 2009	PS3	91/100	90.56%
FIFA Soccer 10	EA Sports	October 20, 2009	PS3	91/100	90.26%
Street Fighter IV	Capcom	July 2, 2009	WIN	91/100	90.21%
Peggle	PopCap Games	November 19, 2009	PS3	91/100	89.3%
Wipeout HD Fury	Sony Computer Entertainment	July 23, 2009	PS3	89/100	90.8%
Persona 3 Portable	Atlus	November 1, 2009	PSP	89/100	90.77%
Braid	Number None	April 10, 2009	WIN	90/100	90.5%
Grand Theft Auto: Chinatown Wars	Rockstar Games	October 20, 2009	PSP	90/100	90.39%
Colin McRae: Dirt 2	Codemasters	December 4, 2009	WIN	89/100	90.29%
Assassin's Creed II	Ubisoft	November 17, 2009	XB360	90/100	90.01%
Bayonetta	Sega	October 29, 2009	XB360	90/100	89.89%
Grand Theft Auto IV: The Lost and Damned	Rockstar Games	February 17, 2009	XB360	90/100	89.73%
MLB 09: The Show	Sony Computer Entertainment	March 3, 2009	PS3	90/100	89.6%
FIFA Soccer 10	EA Sports	October 20, 2009	XB360	90/100	88.98%
Empire: Total War	Sega	March 3, 2009	WIN	90/100	88.87%
The Beatles: Rock Band	MTV Games	September 9, 2009	Wii	89/100	90%
The Beatles: Rock Band	MTV Games	September 9, 2009	XB360	89/100	89.83%
Demon's Souls	Sony Computer Entertainment	February 5, 2009	PS3	89/100	89.72%
The Beatles: Rock Band	MTV Games	September 9, 2009	PS3	88/100	89.66%
Guitar Hero 5	Activision	September 1, 2009	Wii	89/100	89.58%
Grand Theft Auto IV: The Ballad of Gay Tony	Rockstar Games	October 29, 2009	XB360	89/100	89.43%
Peggle	PopCap Games	November 19, 2009	XB360	89/100	89.33%
Shadow Complex	Microsoft Game Studios	August 19, 2009	XB360	88/100	89.23%
NHL 10	EA Sports	September 15, 2009	XB360	88/100	89.14%
Tiger Woods PGA Tour 10	EA Sports	June 8, 2009	Wii	88/100	89.11%
Left 4 Dead 2	Valve	November 17, 2009	XB360	89/100	89.05%
Left 4 Dead 2	Valve	November 16, 2009	WIN	89/100	88.26%
EVE Online: Special Edition	Atari	March 10, 2009	WIN	88/100	88.33%
Plants vs. Zombies	PopCap Games	May 5, 2009	WIN	87/100	88.32%
Football Manager 2010	Sega	October 30, 2009	WIN	87/100	88.2%
New Super Mario Bros. Wii	Nintendo	November 11, 2009	Wii	87/100	88.18%
Burnout Paradise: The Ultimate Box	Electronic Arts	February 5, 2009	WIN	87/100	88.09%
Fight Night Round 4	EA Sports	June 23, 2009	PS3	88/100	88%
NHL 10	EA Sports	September 15, 2009	PS3	88/100	87.98%
The Secret of Monkey Island: Special Edition	LucasArts	July 15, 2009	XB360	88/100	87.73%
Pokémon SoulSilver Version	Nintendo	September 12, 2009	DS	87/100	88%
Dragon Quest IX	Square Enix	July 11, 2009	DS	87/100	87.98%
Ratchet & Clank Future: A Crack in Time	Sony Computer Entertainment	October 27, 2009	PS3	87/100	87.88%
Call of Duty: Modern Warfare 2	Activision	November 10, 2009	WIN	86/100	87.84%
Pokémon HeartGold Version	Nintendo	September 12, 2009	DS	87/100	87.81%
LittleBigPlanet	Sony Computer Entertainment	November 17, 2009	PSP	87/100	87.7%
Sin & Punishment: Star Successor	Nintendo	October 29, 2009	Wii	87/100	85.86
PixelJunk Monsters Deluxe	Q-Games	October 1, 2009	PSP	86/100	87.64%

=== Major awards ===
Category/Organization		27th Golden Joystick Awards October 30, 2009	VGA December 12, 2009		13th Annual Interactive Achievement Awards February 18, 2010			10th Game Developers Choice Awards March 11, 2010	6th British Academy Games Awards March 19, 2010
Game of the Year		Fallout 3	Uncharted 2: Among Thieves						Batman: Arkham Asylum
Independent / Debut (Note: Certain award presentations combine these categories.)		—N/a	Flower		—N/a			Torchlight	—N/a
Downloadable		—N/a	Shadow Complex		—N/a			Flower	—N/a
Mobile/Handheld	Mobile	Metal Gear Solid Touch	Grand Theft Auto: Chinatown Wars		Scribblenauts				LittleBigPlanet (PSP)
Mobile/Handheld	Handheld	Grand Theft Auto: Chinatown Wars	Grand Theft Auto: Chinatown Wars		Scribblenauts				LittleBigPlanet (PSP)
Innovation		—N/a			Scribblenauts				—N/a
Artistic Achievement or Graphics	Animation	—N/a	Uncharted 2: Among Thieves		Uncharted 2: Among Thieves			Uncharted 2: Among Thieves	Flower
Artistic Achievement or Graphics	Art Direction	—N/a	Uncharted 2: Among Thieves		Uncharted 2: Among Thieves			Uncharted 2: Among Thieves	Flower
Audio	Music	—N/a	Halo 3: ODST		Uncharted 2: Among Thieves			Uncharted 2: Among Thieves	Uncharted 2: Among Thieves
Audio	Sound Design	—N/a	—N/a		Uncharted 2: Among Thieves			Uncharted 2: Among Thieves	Uncharted 2: Among Thieves
Audio	Soundtrack	Guitar Hero World Tour	DJ Hero		Brütal Legend			Uncharted 2: Among Thieves	—N/a
Character or Performance	Actor	—N/a	Hugh Jackman as Wolverine; X-Men Origins: Wolverine	Eddie Riggs; Brütal Legend	Mark Hamill as The Joker; Batman: Arkham Asylum			—N/a	
Character or Performance	Actress	—N/a	Megan Fox as Mikaela Banes; Transformers: Revenge of the Fallen	Eddie Riggs; Brütal Legend	Mark Hamill as The Joker; Batman: Arkham Asylum			—N/a	
Game Direction or Design	Game Design	—N/a			Batman: Arkham Asylum			Batman: Arkham Asylum	
Game Direction or Design	Game Direction	—N/a			Uncharted 2: Among Thieves			Batman: Arkham Asylum	
Narrative	Adapted	—N/a			Batman: Arkham Asylum			Uncharted 2: Among Thieves	
Narrative	Original	—N/a			Uncharted 2: Among Thieves			Uncharted 2: Among Thieves	
Technical Achievement	Gameplay Engineering	—N/a			Uncharted 2: Among Thieves			Uncharted 2: Among Thieves	—N/a
Technical Achievement	Visual Engineering	—N/a			Uncharted 2: Among Thieves			Uncharted 2: Among Thieves	—N/a
Multiplayer/Online	Multiplayer	Call of Duty: World at War	Call of Duty: Modern Warfare 2					—N/a	Left 4 Dead 2
Multiplayer/Online	Online	Left 4 Dead	Call of Duty: Modern Warfare 2					—N/a	FIFA 10
Action/Adventure	Action/Shooter	—N/a	Call of Duty: Modern Warfare 2					—N/a	Uncharted 2: Among Thieves
Action/Adventure	Adventure	—N/a	Assassin's Creed II		Uncharted 2: Among Thieves			—N/a	Uncharted 2: Among Thieves
Casual/Family or Rhythm	Casual	LittleBigPlanet	The Beatles: Rock Band		Flower			—N/a	Wii Sports Resort
Casual/Family or Rhythm	Family	LittleBigPlanet	The Beatles: Rock Band		The Beatles: Rock Band			—N/a	Wii Sports Resort
Fighting		—N/a	Street Fighter IV					—N/a	
Role-Playing		—N/a	Dragon Age: Origins					—N/a	
Social Networking		—N/a			FarmVille				—N/a
Sports	Individual	—N/a	UFC 2009 Undisputed		FIFA 10			—N/a	FIFA 10
Sports	Team	—N/a	NHL 10		FIFA 10			—N/a	FIFA 10
Racing		—N/a	Forza Motorsport 3					—N/a	
Strategy/Simulation		—N/a			Brütal Legend			—N/a	Empire: Total War
Special Award		—N/a			Hall of Fame	Lifetime Achievement Award	Pioneer Award	Lifetime Achievement Award	Academy Fellowship
Special Award		—N/a			Mark Cerny	Douglas Lowenstein	David Crane	John Carmack	Shigeru Miyamoto

== Major events ==
Date	Event	Ref.
January 29–31	Ensemble Studios, the creators of the Age of Empires series, was shut down after about 15 years of service.	
February 3–5	Crytek, the developers of FarCry and Crysis, buys Free Radical Design, the developers of the TimeSplitters series and renames them to Crytek UK.	
February 4–6	Warner Bros. Interactive Entertainment acquires Snowblind Studios, the developers of Baldur's Gate: Dark Alliance.	
March 10	5th British Academy Video Games Awards, honoring achievement for video games released in late 2007 and 2008.	
March 23–27	Game Developers Conference 2009 was held in San Francisco, California	
April 22–24	Square Enix fully acquires Eidos Interactive, the publishers of the Tomb Raider and Hitman series.	
June 2–4	E3 2009 in Los Angeles, which showcased many new games as well as new motion controllers for both the PlayStation 3 and the Xbox 360. Sony's new iteration of its PlayStation Portable handheld was also revealed, the PSP Go is the first handheld console to forgo the use of any physical media opting instead to use Digital Download-only.	
June 24	ZeniMax Media, the owner of Bethesda Softworks, fully acquires id Software, the developers of Doom, Wolfenstein and Quake.	
July 3–5	ScrewAttack Gaming Convention at the Westin DFW in Dallas/Fort Worth, Texas, United States	
August 13–16	QuakeCon 2009 at the Hilton Anatole in Dallas, Texas, United States	
August 17–21	In Sweden, Joakim Bennet announces that the video game magazine "Super Play" will be discontinued in the near future.	
August 17–19	Games Developers Conference Europe 2009 held at Cologne Trade Fair in Cologne, Germany	
August 19–23	Gamescom 2009 held at Cologne Trade Fair in Cologne, Germany where Sony unveiled the new version of its PlayStation 3 consoles the 120GB PS3 Slim which rebranded the PlayStation 3 using a new logo as well as a new exterior design.	
August 21–22	BlizzCon 2009 was held at Anaheim Convention Center in Anaheim, California, United States whose tickets were sold out online within minutes of them being released.	
August 27–31	Batman: Arkham Asylum attains a Guinness World Record for 'Most Critically Acclaimed Superhero Game Ever'.	
September 1–3	Launch of the new 120GB Sony PS3 Slim with a cheaper price which has been positively received by critics and gamers alike garnering positive reviews and high sales worldwide.	
September 4–7	PAX 2009 at the Washington State Convention and Trade Center in Seattle, Washington, United States.	
September 9–13	Apple launched the iPod Touch 3G.	
September 17–20	GCA Games Convention Asia 2009 is to be held at the Suntec Singapore International Convention and Exhibition Centre in Singapore.	
September 24–27	Tokyo Game Show 2009 is to be held at the Makuhari Messe, in Chiba, Japan. One of the biggest video game conventions alongside E3 and Gamescom.	
October 1–4	Launch of the new Sony PSP Go which was met with mixed reviews due to its high pricing in comparison to its predecessor the PSP-3000.	
October 23–25	Infinite Bits 2009 at the Doubletree Miami Mart Hotel and Convention Center in Miami, Florida, United States.	
October 30 – November 1	International Digital Entertainment Festival 2009 (iDEF) held at the Royal Exhibition Building, Carlton in Melbourne, Australia.	
November 14–16	GameOn! London at Earls Court. Exhibitors include Capcom, Electronic Arts, Nintendo and Sony Computer Entertainment.	
December 12	The 2009 Spike Video Game Awards are held.	
Unknown	Esports organization Team SoloMid is launched	

== Notable deaths ==
- June 3 – David Carradine, 72, actor who played Clockwork in Danny Phantom: The Ultimate Enemy and William Sharp in Saints Row.
- June 25 – Michael Jackson, 50, musician who (in addition to various cameos) was the subject of 1990's Moonwalker, the composer of Sonic 3's soundtrack, and the namesake of the Just Dance spinoff: The Experience.
- August 2 – Deng Sanshan, a teenager in China who was reportedly beaten to death in an extralegal addiction "boot camp" designed to treat video game and internet addiction.
- October 14 – Lou Albano, 76, pro wrestler and actor who played Mario in The Super Mario Bros. Super Show!.

== Hardware releases ==
The following is a list of game consoles released in 2009. This year just saw revision models of current game consoles; such as PlayStation 3 Slim, the PSP Go, the worldwide release of the Nintendo DSi (which initially in Japan the previous year), and the Nintendo DSi XL (named the "DSi LL" in Japan).

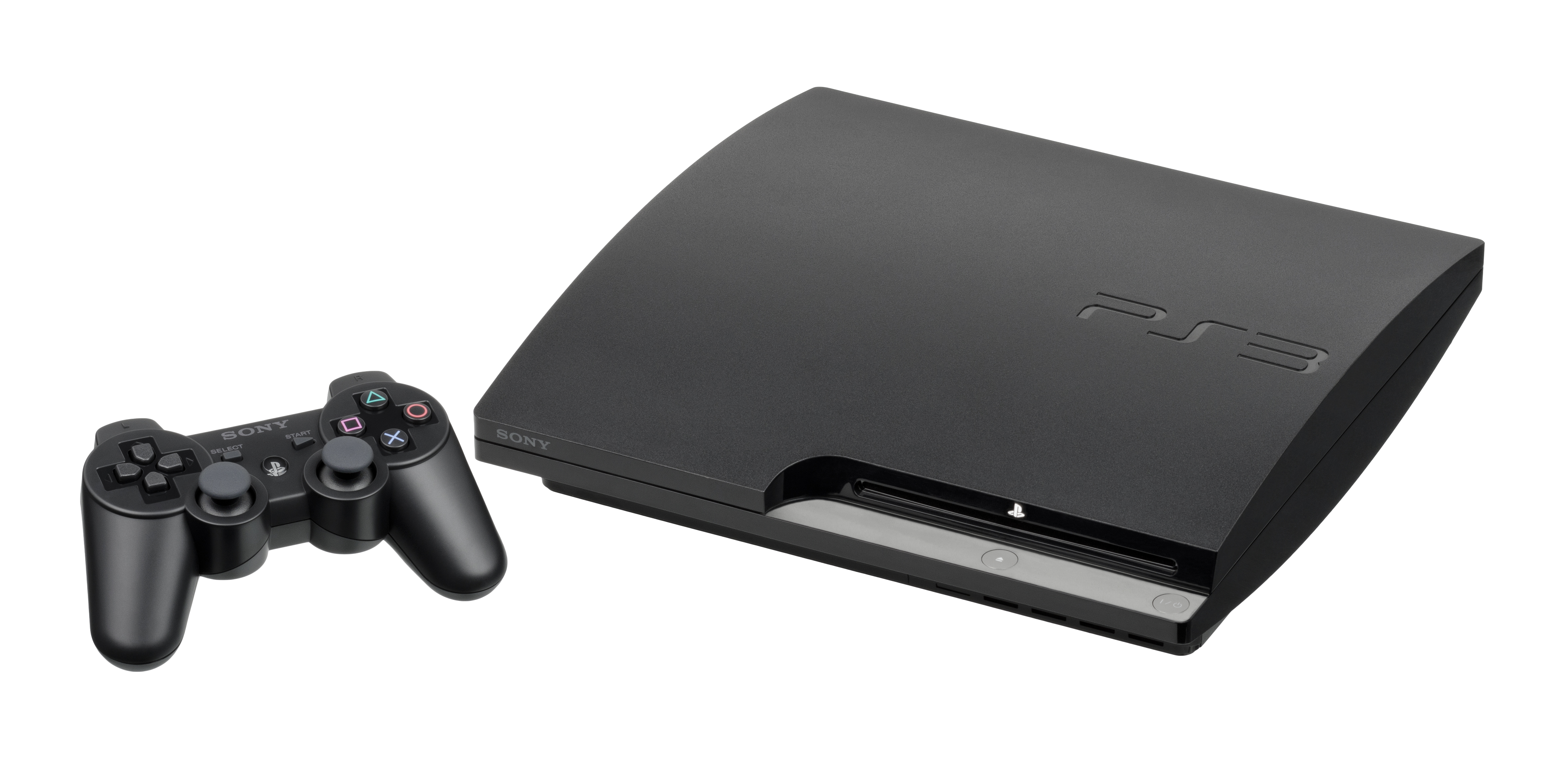
PlayStation 3 Slim

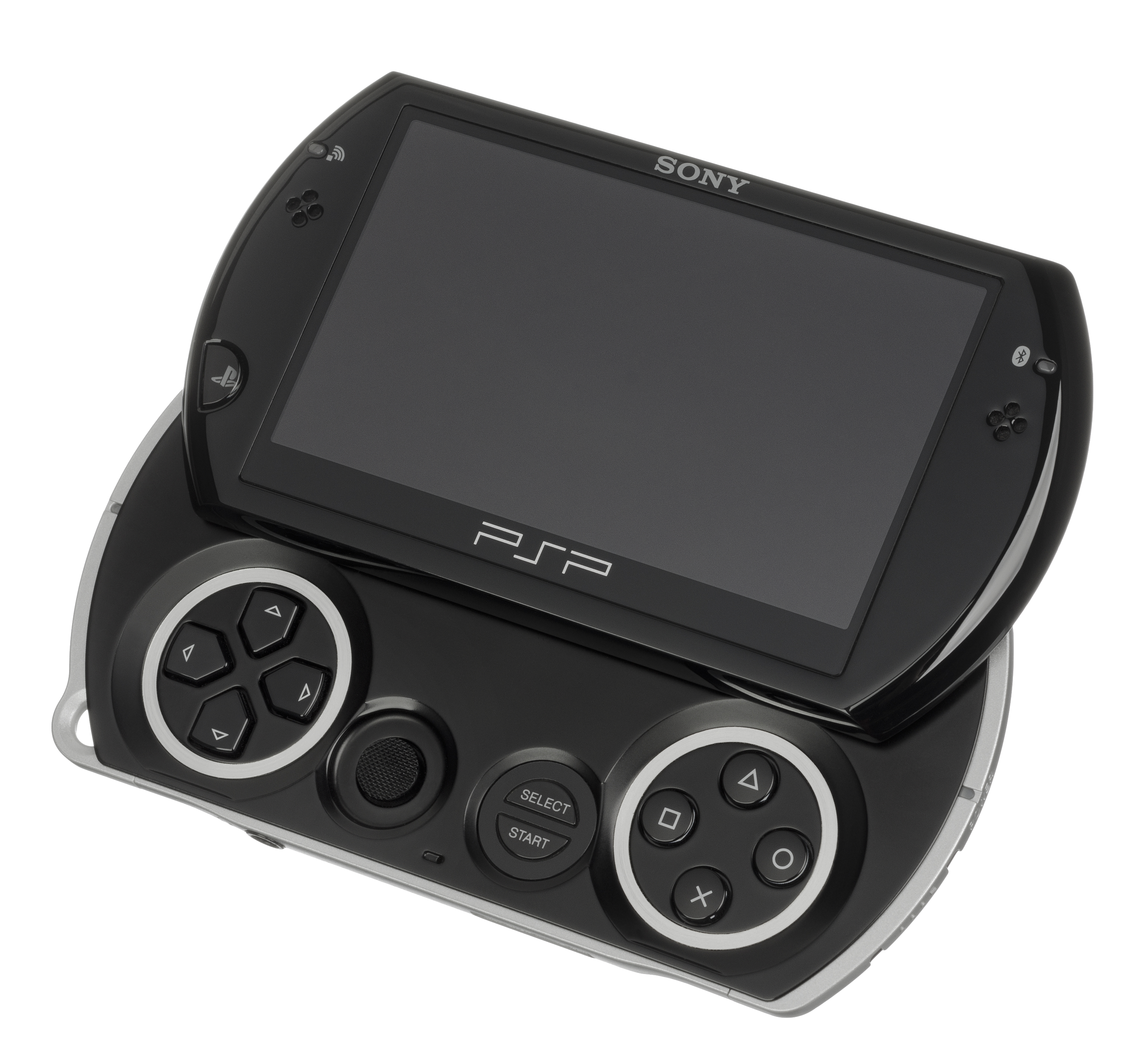
PSP Go

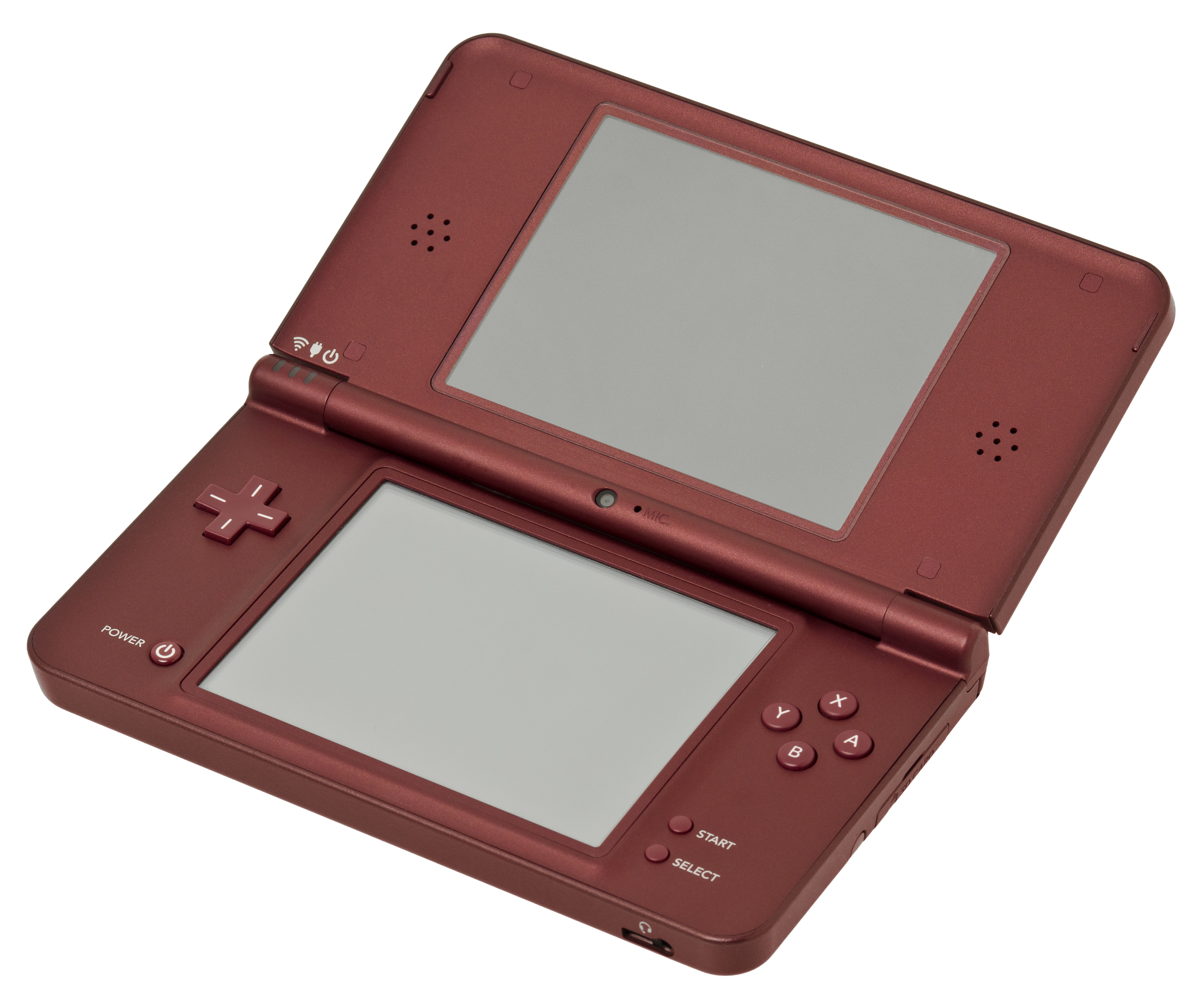
Nintendo DSi XL (named "DSi LL" in Japan)

Day	Console	Ref.
April 2	Nintendo DSi (AU)	
April 3	Nintendo DSi (EU)	
April 5	Nintendo DSi (NA)	
September 1	PlayStation 3 Slim (NA, EU)	
September 3	PlayStation 3 Slim (JP, AU, NZ)	
October 1	PSP Go (NA, EU)	
October 31	PSP Go (JP)	
November 21	DSi XL (Note: Named "Nintendo DSi LL" in Japan) (JP)	

== Games released in 2009 ==
Release date	Title	Platform	Genre	Ref.
January 5	Sandy Beach	Wii		
January 6	Bigfoot: Collision Course	DS		
January 6	Elebits: The Adventures of Kai and Zero	DS		
January 6	Saints Row 2	WIN		
January 8	Cuboid	PSN		
January 12	Neighborhood Games	Wii		
January 12	Planet Pachinko	Wii		
January 13	Deal or No Deal	Wii		
January 13	Mirror's Edge	WIN		
January 13	Moon	DS		
January 13	The Lord of the Rings: Conquest	PS3, WIN, XB360, DS		
January 19	High Voltage Hot Rod Show	Wii		
January 20	Ar tonelico II: Melody of Metafalica	PS2		
January 20	Imagine Fashion Party	Wii		
January 20	Star Ocean: Second Evolution	PSP		
January 21	Big Bang Mini	DS		
January 21	SimAnimals	DS, Wii		
January 21	Skate 2	PS3, XB360		
January 21	The Maw	XB360		
January 26	MLB Front Office Manager	PS3, WIN, XB360		
January 27	Afro Samurai	PS3, XB360		
January 27	Coraline	PS2, DS, Wii		
January 27	DJ Max Fever	PSP		
January 28	Rygar: The Battle of Argus	Wii		
January 29	Savage Moon	PS3		
January 30	Jets'n'Guns	LIN		
February 3	Burnout Paradise: The Ultimate Box	WIN		
February 3	Demon's Souls	PS3		
February 3	My World, My Way	DS		
February 3	Phineas and Ferb	DS		
February 3	Tenchu: Shadow Assassins	Wii		
February 3	Ultimate Shooting Collection	Wii		
February 6	Burnout Paradise: The Ultimate Box	PS3, XB360		
February 9	Deadly Creatures	Wii		
February 9	LIT	Wii		
February 10	F.E.A.R. 2: Project Origin	PS3, WIN, XB360		
February 10	LocoRoco 2	PSP		
February 10	NASCAR Kart Racing	Wii		
February 10	OneChanbara: Bikini Samurai Squad	XB360		
February 10	OneChanbara: Bikini Zombie Slayers	Wii		
February 10	Retro Game Challenge	DS		
February 10	Sonic's Ultimate Genesis Collection	PS3, XB360		
February 10	The House of the Dead: Overkill	Wii		
February 10	X-Blades	PS3, WIN, XB360		
February 11	3 on 3 NHL Arcade	PS3, XB360		
February 12	Flower	PS3		
February 13	Perimeter 2: New Earth	WIN		
February 16	Evasive Space	Wii		
February 16	Fire Emblem: Shadow Dragon	DS		
February 17	Brave: Shaman's Challenge	DS		
February 17	Disney Sing It! – High School Musical 3: Senior Year	PS3, PS2, Wii, XB360		
February 17	Dragon Quest V: Hand of the Heavenly Bride	DS		
February 17	Grand Theft Auto IV: The Lost and Damned	XB360		
February 17	Prinny: Can I Really Be the Hero?	PSP		
February 17	Race Pro	XB360		
February 17	Street Fighter IV	PS3, XB360		
February 18	Death Tank	XB360		
February 19	Blue Dragon Plus	DS		
February 19	Noby Noby Boy	PS3		
February 19	Warhammer 40,000: Dawn of War II	WIN		
February 24	50 Cent: Blood on the Sand	PS3, XB360		
February 24	Dead Rising: Chop Till You Drop	Wii		
February 24	Puzzle Quest: Galactrix	DS, WIN		
February 24	Shellshock 2: Blood Trails	PS3, WIN, XB360		
February 24	Star Ocean: The Last Hope	XB360		
February 24	Stoked	XB360		
February 24	Tom Clancy's EndWar	WIN		
February 26	Eat Lead: The Return of Matt Hazard	PS3, XB360		
February 26	Halo Wars	XB360		
February 27	Killzone 2	PS3		
February 27	NecroVisioN	WIN		
February 27	Peggle: Dual Shot	DS		
February 27	Rogue Trooper	Wii		
March 3	Brain Challenge Deluxe	PSN		
March 3	Empire: Total War	WIN		
March 3	King of Fighters '98: Ultimate Match	PS2		
March 3	Major League Baseball 2K9	XB360, PS3, PS2, PSP, Wii		
March 3	MLB 09: The Show	PS3, PS2, PSP		
March 3	Phantasy Star Portable	PSP		
March 3	Sonic and the Black Knight	Wii		
March 3	SpongeBob vs. The Big One: Beach Party Cook-Off	DS		
March 4	Watchmen: The End Is Nigh	PS3, WIN, XB360		
March 5	Flight Control	iOS		
March 6	Tom Clancy's H.A.W.X.	PS3, XB360, iOS		
March 9	Gradius ReBirth	Wii		
March 9	The Maw	WIN		
March 9	Tomb Raider: Underworld	PS2		
March 10	Avalon Code	DS		
March 10	Boing! Docomodake DS	DS		
March 10	Grey's Anatomy: The Video Game	WIN, DS, PS3, Wii, XB360		
March 10	MadWorld	Wii		
March 10	Mana Khemia: Student Alliance	PSP		
March 10	Men of War	WIN		
March 10	MySims Party	DS, Wii		
March 10	Ski-Doo: Snowmobile Challenge	PS3		
March 10	World in Conflict: Soviet Assault	WIN		
March 11	Crystal Defenders	XB360		
March 11	Let's Golf	iOS		
March 11	Peggle	XB360		
March 12	Astro Tripper	PSN		
March 12	Command & Conquer Red Alert 3: Uprising	WIN		
March 13	Codename Panzers: Cold War	WIN		
March 13	Resident Evil 5	PS3, XB360		
March 16	Bit.Trip Beat	Wii		
March 16	Valkyrie Profile: Covenant of the Plume	DS		
March 17	Grand Ages: Rome	WIN		
March 17	Grand Theft Auto: Chinatown Wars	DS		
March 17	Henry Hatsworth in the Puzzling Adventure	DS		
March 17	Marble Saga: Kororinpa	Wii		
March 17	Resistance: Retribution	PSP		
March 17	Rune Factory Frontier	Wii		
March 17	Suikoden Tierkreis	DS		
March 17	Tom Clancy's H.A.W.X.	WIN		
March 17	TrackMania DS	DS		
March 17	Wanted: Weapons of Fate	PS3, WIN, XB360		
March 18	Metal Gear Solid Touch	iOS		
March 21	Broken Sword: Shadow of the Templars – The Director's Cut	DS, Wii		
March 22	Pokémon Platinum (North America)	DS		
March 23	BattleForge	WIN		
March 23	Command & Conquer: Red Alert 3	PS3, iOS		
March 23	Dark Sector	WIN		
March 23	Touch Mechanic	DS		
March 24	Final Fantasy Crystal Chronicles: Echoes of Time	DS, Wii		
March 24	Freaky Creatures	WIN		
March 24	Lux-Pain	DS		
March 24	Major Minor's Majestic March	Wii		
March 24	Stormrise	PS3, WIN, XB360		
March 24	Tenchu: Shadow Assassins	PSP		
March 24	The Last Remnant	WIN		
March 24	The Wheelman	PS3, WIN, XB360		
March 24	Wallace & Gromit's Grand Adventures	WIN		
March 24	WWE Legends of WrestleMania	PS3, XB360		
March 26	Mega Man 2	iOS		
March 26	Worms	PSN		
March 27	Leisure Suit Larry: Box Office Bust	WIN, XB360		
March 29	Guitar Hero: Metallica	PS2, PS3, Wii, XB360		
March 30	TNA Wrestling	iOS		
March 31	Galaga Remix	iOS		
April 1	The Dishwasher: Dead Samurai	XB360		
April 2	Dance Dance Revolution Disney Grooves	Wii		
April 3	Bird & Beans	DS		
April 4	24: Special Ops	iOS		
April 7	Elven Legacy	WIN		
April 7	Guilty Gear XX Accent Core Plus	PSP		
April 7	Hammerin' Hero	PSP		
April 7	Hannah Montana: The Movie	DS, PS3, Wii, XB360		
April 7	Ninja Blade	XB360		
April 7	The Chronicles of Riddick: Assault on Dark Athena	PS3, WIN, XB360		
April 7	The Godfather Part II: The Game	PS3, XB360, WIN		
April 7	Yamaha Supercross	DS		
April 8	Dragon Ball: Evolution	PSP		
April 8	Flock!	XB360		
April 8	Puzzle Quest: Galactrix	XB360		
April 9	Company of Heroes: Tales of Valor	WIN		
April 9	Flock!	PSN		
April 9	Rag Doll Kung Fu: Fists of Plastic	PSN		
April 10	Braid	WIN		
April 14	Demigod	WIN		
April 14	Dokapon Journey	DS		
April 14	The Dark Spire	DS		
April 15	OutRun Online Arcade	XB360		
April 16	Dream Chronicles: The Chosen Child	WIN		
April 20	Crystal Defenders R1	Wii		
April 20	Dr. Mario Express	DS		
April 20	Excitebots: Trick Racing	Wii		
April 21	Zeno Clash	WIN		
April 22	Dynasty Warriors: Gundam 2	PS3, PS2, XB360		
April 27	Paper Airplane Chase	DS		
April 28	Super Robot Taisen OG Saga: Endless Frontier	DS		
April 28	Velvet Assassin	XB360, WIN		
April 29	Cyber Troopers Virtual-On Oratorio Tangram	XB360		
April 29	Stalin vs. Martians	WIN		
May 1	X-Men Origins: Wolverine	DS, PS2, PS3, Wii, WIN, XB360, PSP		
May 4	New Play Control! Donkey Kong Jungle Beat	Wii		
May 5	Klonoa	Wii		
May 5	Night at the Museum: Battle of the Smithsonian	DS, Wii, WIN, XB360		
May 5	Plants vs. Zombies	WIN, OSX, iOS, XB360, PSN, DS, Bada, DROID, WP, PSV, BBOS		
May 5	The Destiny of Zorro	Wii		
May 6	Space Invaders Extreme	XB360		
May 6	Zombie Wranglers	XB360		
May 7	Puzzle Quest: Galactrix	PS3		
May 8	Secret Files 2: Puritas Cordis	WIN, Wii, DS		
May 10	Resident Evil: Degeneration	iOS		
May 11	Magician's Quest: Mysterious Times	DS		
May 12	Battlestations: Pacific	WIN, XB360		
May 12	Garfield Gets Real	Wii		
May 12	Help Wanted	Wii		
May 12	Leisure Suit Larry: Box Office Bust	PS3		
May 12	Sacred 2: Fallen Angel	PS3, XB360		
May 14	Killing Floor	WIN		
May 14	Pirates: Duels on the High Seas	DS		
May 14	Zen Pinball	PSN		
May 17	Minecraft	WIN		
May 18	Art Style: PiCTOBiTS	DS		
May 18	Crystal Defenders R2	Wii		
May 18	Punch-Out!!	Wii		
May 19	Bionic Commando	PS3, XB360		
May 19	Boom Blox Bash Party	Wii		
May 19	Puchi Puchi Virus	DS		
May 19	Steal Princess	DS		
May 19	Terminator Salvation	PS3, WIN, XB360, iOS		
May 19	UFC 2009 Undisputed	PS3, XB360		
May 19	Yu-Gi-Oh! 5D's: Wheelie Breakers	Wii		
May 25	Bubble Bobble Plus!	Wii		
May 25	NecroVisioN	WIN		
May 26	Crimson Gem Saga	PSP		
May 26	Damnation	WIN, PS3, XB360		
May 26	inFamous	PS3		
May 26	Jake Hunter Detective Story: Memories of the Past	DS		
May 26	The Munchables	Wii		
May 28	The Polynomial: Space of the Music	WIN, OSX, LIN		
June 1	CellFactor: Psychokinetic Wars	PSN, XB360, WIN		
June 1	Mighty Flip Champs!	DS		
June 2	Fuel	PS3, XB360		
June 2	Knights in the Nightmare	DS		
June 2	Red Faction: Guerrilla	PS3, XB360		
June 2	The Sims 3	WIN, OSX		
June 4	Prey Invasion	iOS		
June 4	Trash Panic	PS3		
June 8	MySims Racing	Wii, DS		
June 8	The Legendary Starfy	DS		
June 8	Tiger Woods PGA Tour 10	PS2, PS3, PSP, Wii, XB360		
June 9	Black Sigil: Blade of the Exiled	DS		
June 9	Guitar Hero On Tour: Modern Hits	DS		
June 9	Indiana Jones and the Staff of Kings	Wii, DS, PSP, PS2		
June 9	Lego Battles	DS		
June 9	Miami Law	DS		
June 9	Prototype	PS3, WIN, XB360		
June 9	Rock Band Unplugged	PSP		
June 9	Virtua Tennis 2009	XB360, PS3, Wii		
June 10	Gunstar Heroes	XB360		
June 11	Bomberman Ultra	PSN		
June 11	Johnny Bravo In The Hukka Mega Mighty Ultra Extreme Date-O-Rama!	DS		
June 15	Eduardo the Samurai Toaster	Wii		
June 15	Rainbow Islands: Towering Adventure!	Wii		
June 16	Ghostbusters: The Video Game	DS, PS2, PS3, Wii, WIN, XB360		
June 16	Guitar Hero: Smash Hits	PS2, PS3, Wii, XB360		
June 22	Adam's Venture: The Search for the Lost Garden	WIN		
June 22	Art Style: BOXLIFE	DS		
June 22	Drill Sergeant Mindstrong	Wii		
June 22	Mass Effect Galaxy	iOS		
June 23	Anno 1404	WIN, DS, Wii		
June 23	Monster Hunter Freedom Unite	PSP		
June 23	Overlord II	PS3, WIN, XB360		
June 23	Overlord: Dark Legend	Wii		
June 23	Overlord: Minions	DS		
June 23	PangYa: Fantasy Golf	PSP		
June 23	Spore Galactic Adventures	WIN		
June 23	The Conduit	Wii		
June 23	Transformers Revenge of the Fallen: Autobots	DS		
June 23	Transformers: Revenge of the Fallen	DS, PS2, PS3, Wii, WIN, XB360, PSP		
June 24	Garou: Mark of the Wolves	XB360		
June 25	Battlefield Heroes	WIN		
June 25	Fight Night Round 4	PS3, XB360		
June 26	Blood Bowl	PS3, WIN, XB360		
June 30	BlazBlue: Calamity Trigger	PS3, XB360		
June 30	Call of Juarez: Bound in Blood	PS3, WIN, XB360		
June 30	Harry Potter and the Half Blood Prince	OSX, WIN, DS, PS2, PS3, PSP, Wii, XB360		
June 30	Ice Age: Dawn of the Dinosaurs	DS, PS2, PS3, Wii, WIN, XB360		
June 30	Infernal: Hell's Vengeance	XB360		
June 30	Mega Man Star Force 3	DS		
July 1	Worms 2: Armageddon	XB360		
July 2	The Punisher: No Mercy	PS3		
July 2	Treasure World	DS		
July 3	Fuel	WIN		
July 3	Trine	WIN		
July 3	Virtua Tennis 2009	WIN		
July 6	Asphalt 4: Elite Racing	DS		
July 7	ArmA 2	WIN		
July 7	Street Fighter IV	WIN		
July 7	Tales of Monkey Island	WIN		
July 7	The Bigs 2	XB360, PS3, PS2, Wii, PSP		
July 8	Battlefield 1943	XB360, PS3		
July 13	Ant Nation	Wii		
July 14	Nancy Drew: Ransom of the Seven Ships	WIN		
July 14	NCAA Football 10	XB360, PS3, PS2, PSP, iOS		
July 15	Madballs in Babo: Invasion	XB360		
July 16	Namco Museum Essentials	PSN		
July 16	Unbound Saga	PSP		
July 16	Xevious Resurrection	PS3		
July 20	Art Style: ZENGAGE	DS		
July 20	Final Fantasy Crystal Chronicles: My Life as a Darklord	Wii		
July 21	Garfield Gets Real	DS		
July 21	Little King's Story	Wii		
July 21	Rock Band Country Track Pack	PS2, PS3, Wii, XB360		
July 21	Watchmen: The End Is Nigh:The Complete Experience	PS3, XB360		
July 22	'Splosion Man	XB360		
July 23	Dragon Ball: Revenge of King Piccolo	Wii		
July 23	Shatter	PSN		
July 23	Wipeout HD Fury	PSN		
July 26	Guitar Hero World Tour	WIN		
July 26	Wii Sports Resort	Wii		
July 27	Resident Evil 4	iOS		
July 27	The Three Musketeers: One for all!	Wii		
July 28	Bionic Commando	WIN		
July 28	Dark Salvation	WIN		
July 28	The King of Fighters XII	PS3, XB360		
July 29	Marvel vs. Capcom 2: New Age of Heroes	XB360		
July 30	Fat Princess	PS3		
July 30	Minigore	iOS		
July 30	Puyo Puyo 7	DS		
July 30	Strikers 1945 Plus	PSP		
July 30	Watchmen: The End Is Nigh Part 2	PS3, XB360		
July 31	East India Company	WIN		
August 3	Brave: A Warrior's Tale	PSP		
August 4	Brave: A Warrior's Tale	XB360		
August 4	G.I. Joe: The Rise of Cobra	DS, PS2, PS3, PSP, Wii, XB360		
August 6	Crystal Defenders	PS3		
August 7	AMF Bowling Pinbusters!	iOS		
August 7	Ashes Cricket 2009	PS3, WIN, XB360, Wii		
August 7	Hearts of Iron III	WIN		
August 8	Geared	iOS		
August 9	SingStar Queen	PS3		
August 10	Brave: A Warrior's Tale	Wii		
August 10	Death to Spies: Moment of Truth	WIN		
August 10	Fossil Fighters	DS		
August 10	NyxQuest: Kindred Spirits	Wii		
August 10	Still Life 2	WIN, OSX		
August 11	Active Life: Extreme Challenge	Wii		
August 11	C.O.R.E.	DS		
August 12	Trials HD	XB360		
August 13	Marvel vs. Capcom 2: New Age of Heroes	PSN		
August 14	Madden NFL 10	PS3, PSP, XB360		
August 14	Phantom Brave: We Meet Again	Wii		
August 14	Return to Mysterious Island 2	WIN		
August 14	Toy Story Mania!	iOS		
August 18	Minigore	PSP		
August 18	Spectrobes: Origins	Wii		
August 18	Wheelspin	Wii		
August 18	Wolfenstein	PS3, WIN, XB360		
August 19	Shadow Complex	XB360		
August 20	Inkvaders	iOS		
August 21	Raven Squad: Operation Hidden Dagger	WIN, XB360		
August 24	Metroid Prime: Trilogy	Wii		
August 24	Mr. Driller W	Wii		
August 25	Batman: Arkham Asylum	PS3, XB360		
August 25	Cursed Mountain	Wii		
August 25	Dissidia Final Fantasy	PSP		
August 25	Emergency Room: Real Life Rescues	DS		
August 25	Harvest Moon: Magical Melody	Wii		
August 25	Wizards of Waverly Place	DS		
August 26	Invincible Tiger: The Legend of Han Tao	XB360		
August 26	NBA 2K10 Draft Combine	XB360		
August 27	Invincible Tiger: The Legend of Han Tao	PSN		
August 27	Lumines: Touch Fusion	iOS		
August 27	Modern Combat: Sandstorm	iOS		
August 27	Tomb Raider II	PSN		
August 28	The Whispered World	WIN, iOS, OSX, LIN		
August 31	3-2-1, Rattle Battle!	Wii		
August 31	Konami Krazy Racers	iOS		
September 1	Champions Online	WIN		
September 1	Guitar Hero 5	PS2, PS3, Wii, XB360		
September 1	Soul Calibur: Broken Destiny	PSP		
September 2	Defense Grid: The Awakening	XB360		
September 2	Yo-Ho Kablammo	XB360		
September 3	AaaaaAAaaaAAAaaAAAAaAAAAA!!! – A Reckless Disregard for Gravity	WIN		
September 3	Fate/unlimited codes	PSP		
September 4	Section 8	WIN, XB360		
September 4	Venetica	WIN, PS3, XB360		
September 7	Contra ReBirth	Wii		
September 8	AFL Challenge	PSP		
September 8	Ant Nation	DS		
September 8	Colin McRae: Dirt 2	XB360, PS3, PSP, Wii, DS		
September 8	Darkest of Days	WIN, XB360		
September 8	Disgaea 2: Dark Hero Days	PSP		
September 8	IL-2 Sturmovik: Birds of Prey	XB360, PS3, DS, PSP		
September 8	Mini Ninjas	WIN, XB360, PS3, Wii, DS		
September 8	Muramasa: The Demon Blade	Wii		
September 8	The Backyardigans: Robot Rampage	WIN, XB360, PS3, PSP, Wii, DS		
September 9	Raiden IV	XB360		
September 9	The Beatles: Rock Band	PS2, PS3, XB360, Wii		
September 12	Pokémon HeartGold and SoulSilver (Japan)	DS		
September 14	Heroes Over Europe	XB360, PS3, WIN		
September 14	Mario & Luigi: Bowser's Inside Story	DS		
September 14	Spaceball Revolution	Wii		
September 14	Streets of Rage	iOS		
September 15	Batman: Arkham Asylum	WIN		
September 15	Bleach: The 3rd Phantom	DS		
September 15	Cloudy with a Chance of Meatballs	Wii, DS		
September 15	Marvel: Ultimate Alliance 2	DS, PS3, PS2, Wii, XB360		
September 15	Naruto Shippuden: Ninja Destiny 2	DS		
September 15	Need for Speed: Shift	PS3, PSP, WIN, XB360, iOS		
September 15	NHL 10	XB360, PS3		
September 15	NHL 2K10	XB360, PS2, PS3, Wii		
September 15	Red Faction: Guerrilla	WIN		
September 15	Resident Evil 5	WIN		
September 15	Scribblenauts	DS		
September 15	Toy Story Mania!	Wii		
September 15	Wet	PS3, XB360		
September 16	Bubble Bobble Neo!	XB360		
September 16	Shadowgrounds	LIN		
September 16	Sliding Heroes	iOS		
September 17	Madballs in Babo: Invasion	WIN		
September 17	Switchball	PSN		
September 18	Cloudy with a Chance of Meatballs	PS3, XB360, PSP		
September 18	Majesty 2: The Fantasy Kingdom Sim	WIN		
September 18	Shadowgrounds Survivor	LIN		
September 19	LostWinds 2: Winter of the Melodias	Wii		
September 21	You, Me, and the Cubes	Wii		
September 22	Aion: The Tower of Eternity	WIN		
September 22	Fallen Earth	WIN		
September 22	Halo 3: ODST	XB360		
September 22	Katamari Forever	PS3		
September 22	Marvel: Ultimate Alliance 2	PSP		
September 22	Order of War	WIN		
September 22	Pinball Hall of Fame: The Williams Collection	PS3, XB360		
September 22	Rock Band Metal Track Pack	PS2, PS3, Wii, XB360		
September 22	Scooby-Doo! First Frights	DS, PS2, Wii, WIN		
September 22	Spyborgs	Wii		
September 22	Teenage Mutant Ninja Turtles: Smash-Up	Wii, PS2		
September 22	The Price is Right: 2010 Edition	DS, Wii, WIN		
September 23	The Warriors: Street Brawl	WIN, XB360		
September 25	Professor Layton and the Diabolical Box	DS		
September 27	Finger Physics	iOS		
September 28	Arkanoid Plus!	Wii		
September 28	Art Academy: Second Semester	DS		
September 28	Dragon Quest Wars	DS		
September 28	Driift Mania	Wii		
September 28	Mr. Driller	iOS		
September 29	Backbreaker Football: Tackle Alley	iOS		
September 29	Beaterator	PSP		
September 29	Black College Football: BCFX: The Xperience	XB360		
September 29	Cabela's Big Game Hunter 2010	PS3, Wii, XB360		
September 29	Combat of Giants: Dragons	DS		
September 29	Dead Space: Extraction	Wii		
September 29	Kingdom Hearts 358/2 Days	DS		
September 29	MotorStorm: Arctic Edge	PSP		
September 29	MySims Agents	DS, Wii		
September 29	Ninja Gaiden Sigma 2	PS3		
September 29	OsbCure: The Aftermath	PSP		
September 29	Tornado Outbreak	Wii, PS3, XB360		
September 29	Undead Knights	PSP		
September 30	The Wizard of Oz: Beyond the Yellow Brick Road	DS		
October 1	Canabalt	iOS		
October 1	Fieldrunners	PSP		
October 1	Gran Turismo PSP	PSP		
October 1	UmJammer Lammy	PSN		
October 4	Wii Fit Plus	Wii		
October 6	Game Party 3	Wii		
October 6	Naruto Shippuden: Legends: Akatsuki Rising	PSP		
October 6	NBA 2K10	XB360, PS2, PS3, PSP		
October 6	NBA Live 10	PS3, PSP, XB360		
October 6	Operation Flashpoint 2: Dragon Rising	PS3, WIN, XB360		
October 6	Saw: The Video Game	PS3, XB360		
October 6	Spore Hero Arena	DS		
October 6	Star Wars: The Clone Wars – Republic Heroes	PS3, WIN, XB360, Wii, PSP, PS2, DS		
October 7	Lucidity	WIN, XB360		
October 8	Critter Crunch	PS3		
October 9	Cities XL	WIN		
October 12	Cars Race-O-Rama	Wii, PS3, XB360, PS2, DS, PSP		
October 12	Dreamkiller	WIN		
October 12	NBA 2K10	WIN		
October 13	A Boy and His Blob	Wii		
October 13	Afrika	PS3		
October 13	Brütal Legend	PS3, XB360		
October 13	Half-Minute Hero	PSP		
October 13	Hero's Saga Laevatein Tactics	DS		
October 13	Ju-on: The Grudge	Wii		
October 13	MagnaCarta II	XB360		
October 13	Mario & Sonic at the Olympic Winter Games	Wii, DS		
October 13	Nancy Drew: Warnings at Waverly Academy	WIN		
October 13	Uncharted 2: Among Thieves	PS3		
October 13	Way of the Samurai 3	PS3, XB360		
October 15	.detuned	PS3		
October 15	Mushroom Wars	PSN		
October 16	Machinarium	WIN, OSX, LIN		
October 19	Hard-Hat Domo	DS		
October 20	Astro Boy: The Video Game	Wii, PS2, PSP, DS		
October 20	Backyard Football '10	PS2, Wii, XB360		
October 20	Bakugan Battle Brawlers	Wii, PS2, PS3, DS, XB360		
October 20	Borderlands	PS3, XB360		
October 20	Cooking Mama 3: Shop & Chop	DS		
October 20	Eufloria	WIN		
October 20	FIFA 10	PS3, WIN, XB360		
October 20	Grand Theft Auto: Chinatown Wars	PSP		
October 20	Jam Sessions 2	DS		
October 20	Marvel Super Hero Squad	Wii, PS2, PSP, DS		
October 20	MotorStorm: Arctic Edge	PS2		
October 20	Mytran Wars	PSP		
October 20	The Secret Saturdays: Beasts of the 5th Sun	Wii, PS2, PSP, DS		
October 20	Tropico 3	WIN		
October 20	WWE SmackDown vs. Raw 2010	DS, PS2, PS3, PSP, Wii, XB360		
October 22	Armored Core 3 Portable	PSP		
October 22	Metal Drift	WIN		
October 22	Oddworld: Abe's Exoddus	PSN		
October 22	Saw: The Video Game	WIN		
October 22	Trine	PS3		
October 23	Pro Evolution Soccer 2010	WIN, PS3, XB360, DS, PS2, PSP, Wii		
October 26	Borderlands	WIN		
October 26	World of Zoo	DS, Wii, WIN		
October 27	Atelier Annie: Alchemists of Sera Island	DS		
October 27	Ben 10 Alien Force: Vilgax Attacks	PS2, XB360, PSP, Wii, DS		
October 27	Dance Dance Revolution Hottest Party 3	Wii		
October 27	Dance Dance Revolution X2	PS2		
October 27	Disney Fairies: Tinker Bell and the Lost Treasure	DS, Wii		
October 27	DJ Hero	XB360, PS3, PS2, Wii		
October 27	Drawn to Life: The Next Chapter	DS, Wii		
October 27	Fairytale Fights	PS3, XB360		
October 27	Forza Motorsport 3	XB360		
October 27	Geon	Wii		
October 27	League of Legends: Clash of Fates	WIN		
October 27	Madagascar Kartz	DS, PS3, Wii, XB360		
October 27	Nostalgia	DS		
October 27	Painkiller: Resurrection	WIN, XB360		
October 27	Petz: Saddle Club	PSP		
October 27	Ratchet & Clank Future: A Crack in Time	PS3		
October 27	SimAnimals Africa	DS, Wii		
October 27	Ski-Doo: Snowmobile Challenge	Wii		
October 27	System Flaw	DS		
October 27	Tekken 6	PS3, XB360		
October 27	Torchlight	WIN		
October 28	Inferno Pool	PSN, XB360		
October 28	Rainbow Islands: Towering Adventure!	XB360		
October 29	Bayonetta	PS3, XB360		
October 29	Crystal Defenders	PSP		
October 29	Grand Theft Auto: Episodes from Liberty City	XB360		
October 29	Grand Theft Auto: The Ballad of Gay Tony	XB360		
October 29	Hasbro Family Game Night	PSN		
October 29	LocoRoco Midnight Carnival	PSP		
October 29	Zombie Tycoon	PSP		
October 30	Ghostbusters: The Video Game	PSP		
October 31	Ninja Blade	WIN		
November 1	Rabbids Go Home	Wii, DS		
November 2	Asphalt 5	iOS		
November 2	Style Savvy	DS		
November 3	Band Hero	PS2, PS3, Wii, XB360, DS		
November 3	C.O.P. The Recruit	DS		
November 3	Dragon Age: Origins	WIN, PS3, XB360		
November 3	Food Network: Cook or Be Cooked	Wii		
November 3	Jurassic: The Hunted	PS2, PS3, WIN, XB360		
November 3	Lego Rock Band	PS3, XB360, Wii, DS		
November 3	Need for Speed: Nitro	Wii, DS		
November 3	Star Wars Battlefront: Elite Squadron	DS, PSP		
November 3	The Backyardigans	DS, PS3, Wii, XB360		
November 3	We Cheer 2	Wii		
November 4	Earthworm Jim 2	WIN		
November 4	Jak and Daxter: The Lost Frontier	PS2, PSP		
November 5	Numblast	PS3, PSP		
November 6	Maestro! Jump in Music	DS		
November 6	Manhunt 2 (North America)	WIN		
November 6	Star Wars: The Force Unleashed -- Ultimate Sith Edition	WIN, PS3, XB360		
November 8	Shaun White Snowboarding: World Stage	Wii		
November 9	NBA 2K10	Wii		
November 10	Call of Duty: Modern Warfare 2	WIN, PS3, XB360		
November 10	Call of Duty: Modern Warfare Reflex	Wii		
November 10	Call of Duty: Modern Warfare: Mobilized	DS		
November 10	Chaotic: Shadow Warriors	DS, PS3, Wii, XB360		
November 10	Dragon Ball Z: Attack of the Saiyans	DS		
November 10	Dragon Ball: Raging Blast	PS3, XB360		
November 10	Hot Wheels Battle Force 5	DS, PS3, Wii, XB360		
November 10	Jonas	DS		
November 10	Kenka Bancho: Badass Rumble	PSP		
November 10	Teenage Mutant Ninja Turtles: Arcade Attack	DS		
November 10	The Backyardigans: Singing Sensation	WIN, PS3, Wii, XB360		
November 11	0-D Beat Drop	XB360		
November 11	Ghosts 'n Goblins: Gold Knights	iOS		
November 11	NBA Unrivaled	XB360		
November 11	WorldShift	WIN		
November 12	Braid	PSN		
November 12	Disciples III: Renaissance	WIN		
November 12	Frogger Returns	Wii		
November 12	Harvest Moon DS: Sunshine Islands	DS		
November 12	Harvest Moon: Animal Parade	Wii		
November 12	NBA Unrivaled	PSN		
November 12	Phantasy Star 0	DS		
November 15	New Super Mario Bros. Wii	Wii		
November 16	Pokémon Rumble	Wii		
November 17	Assassin's Creed II	PS3, XB360		
November 17	Assassin's Creed II: Discovery	DS		
November 17	Assassin's Creed: Bloodlines	PSP		
November 17	Formula One 2009	Wii, PSP		
November 17	God of War Collection	PS3		
November 17	Jambo! Safari: Animal Rescue	DS, Wii		
November 17	Just Dance	Wii		
November 17	Kamen Rider: Dragon Knight	DS, Wii		
November 17	Left 4 Dead 2	WIN, XB360		
November 17	Lego Indiana Jones 2: The Adventure Continues	Wii, XB360, PS3, DS, PSP, WIN		
November 17	LittleBigPlanet	PSP		
November 17	Resident Evil: The Darkside Chronicles	Wii		
November 17	Tony Hawk: Ride	PS3, Wii, XB360		
November 18	MiniSquadron	iOS		
November 18	NCAA Basketball 10	PS3, XB360		
November 18	The Sims 3: World Adventures	WIN, OSX		
November 18	Yu-Gi-Oh! 5D's Tag Force 4	PSP		
November 23	Bit.Trip Void	Wii		
November 23	Harvest Moon: My Little Shop	Wii		
November 23	Little Tournament Over Yonder	Wii		
November 23	Stoked: Big Air Edition	XB360		
November 24	Gravity Crash	PSN		
November 24	Madden NFL Arcade	PSN, XB360		
November 24	Tekken 6	PSP		
November 25	Fighting Fantasy: The Warlock of Firetop Mountain	DS		
November 26	Puyo Puyo 7	PSP, Wii		
November 26	Solium Infernum	WIN, OSX		
December 1	Alganon	WIN		
December 1	Alvin and the Chipmunks: The Squeakquel	DS, Wii		
December 1	Colin McRae: Dirt 2	WIN		
December 1	James Cameron's Avatar: The Game	PS3, XB360, WIN, Wii, DS, iOS		
December 1	Might & Magic: Clash of Heroes	DS		
December 1	MX vs. ATV Reflex	DS, PS3, PSP, WIN, XB360		
December 1	Resident Evil Archives: Resident Evil Zero	Wii		
December 1	Rogue Warrior	PS3, WIN, XB360		
December 3	Ace Combat Xi: Skies of Incursion	iOS		
December 3	Safecracker: The Ultimate Puzzle Adventure	DS		
December 7	51seer	WIN		
December 7	Beaterator	iOS		
December 7	Magnetis	Wii		
December 7	The Legend of Zelda: Spirit Tracks	DS		
December 8	Driver	iOS		
December 8	James Cameron's Avatar: The Game	PSP		
December 8	Silent Hill: Shattered Memories	Wii		
December 8	The Saboteur	PS3, XB360, WIN		
December 9	Castlevania: The Dracula X Chronicles	PSN		
December 9	Qix++	XB360		
December 10	Frogger Returns	PSN		
December 10	Hyperballoid HD	PS3		
December 11	Angry Birds	iOS		
December 15	Konami Classics	XB360		
December 16	Alien Breed Evolution	XB360		
December 17	N.O.V.A. Near Orbit Vanguard Alliance	iOS		
December 17	Playmobil: Pirates	DS		
December 21	Eco Shooter: Plant 530	Wii		
December 21	The Simpsons Arcade	iOS		
December 22	Battle Fantasia	PSN		
December 22	Guitar Hero: Van Halen	PS2, PS3, Wii, XB360		
December 22	MMA Pro Fighter	WIN, OSX, iOS		
December 22	Savage Moon: The Hera Campaign	PSP		
December 23	0 Day Attack on Earth	XB360		
December 26	Final Fantasy Crystal Chronicles: The Crystal Bearers	Wii		
December 28	Castlevania: The Adventure ReBirth	Wii		

== Video game-based film and television releases ==
Title	Date	Director	Distributor(s)	Franchise	Original game publisher	Ref.
Aaron Stone	February 13, 2009	Bruce Kalish	Disney XD	—N/a	—N/a	
Street Fighter: The Legend of Chun-Li	February 27, 2009	Andrzej Bartkowiak	20th Century Studios	Street Fighter	Capcom	
WCG Ultimate Gamer	March 10, 2009	—N/a	Syfy	—N/a	—N/a	
Moral Kombat	June 5, 2009	Spencer Halpin	—N/a	—N/a	—N/a	
Arceus and the Jewel of Life	July 18, 2009	Kunihiko Yuyama	Toho	Pokémon	Game Freak	
Gamer	September 4, 2009	Mark Neveldine & Brian Taylor	Lionsgate	—N/a	—N/a	
Assassin's Creed: Lineage	October 27, 2009	Yves Simoneau	New Video Group	Assassin's Creed	Ubisoft	
The King of Fighters	November 5, 2009	Gordon Chan	Micott & Basara	The King of Fighters	SNK	
Professor Layton and the Eternal Diva	December 19, 2009	Masakazu Hashimoto	Toho	Professor Layton	Level-5	

== See also ==
- 2009 in esports
- 2009 in games
