= Doodle Jump =

2009 video game

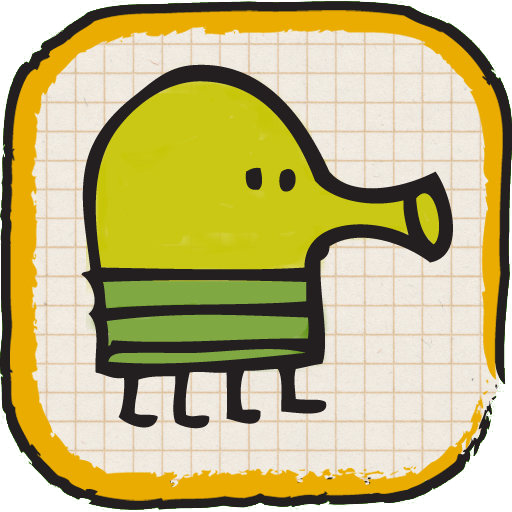
- Icon of the app for iOS and Android
- Developers: Igor and Marko Pušenjak (Lima Sky)
- Publisher: Lima Sky
- Platforms: Android; BlackBerry; iPhone OS; Symbian; Java ME; Xbox 360 Kinect; Windows Phone; Nintendo DS; Nintendo 3DS; Arcade; Series 30+
- Release: March 2009: iOS; March 2009; Android; March 2, 2010; Symbian; May 1, 2010; Windows Phone 7; June 1, 2011; Xbox 360; June 28, 2013; Windows Phone 8; August 21, 2013; Nintendo 3DS/DS; October 29, 2013; Nokia 105 (2017); July 17, 2017
- Genre: Platformer
- Modes: Single-player, multiplayer

Doodle Jump is a 2009 platformer video game developed and published by Igor and Marko Pušenjak, who make up the Lima Sky LLC. The game was released for Windows Phone, iOS, BlackBerry, Android, Java Mobile, Nokia Symbian, and Xbox 360 for the Kinect. It was released worldwide for iOS in March 2009, Android and Blackberry on March 2, 2010, Symbian on May 1, 2010, Windows Phone 7 on June 1, 2011, the iPad on September 1, 2011, and Windows Phone 8 on August 21, 2013. Since its release, the game has been generally well received.

Doodle Jump was renowned for its selling rate by App Store standards, which counted 25,000 copies sold daily for four consecutive months, later overtaken by Angry Birds. As of December 2011, the game sold 10 million copies over iTunes and Google Play. The game has been transformed into a video redemption game at arcades. Igor and Marko Pusenjak are the authors of Doodle Jump, where Igor works from a New York-based address while Marko resides in Croatia. In July 2016, Lima Sky announced a partnership with Skillz to develop a tournament-playable version of the game.

In February 2019, the Kinect version was removed from Xbox Live Arcade alongside Mad Tracks (2006).

On December 20, 2020, a sequel titled Doodle Jump 2 was released on the App Store.

== Gameplay ==
Doodle Jump on Space mode

In Doodle Jump, players must guide a four-legged creature called "The Doodler" up an endless series of platforms without falling. The left side of the playing field wraps around to the right side. For devices with an accelerometer, players tilt the device to move the Doodler in the desired direction.

Players can retrieve power-ups such as propeller hats, jetpacks, rockets, springs, trampolines, and invulnerability shields. There are monsters and UFOs that the Doodler must avoid, shoot, or jump on to eliminate. Aiming is performed by tapping on the screen, but on the Android and Windows Phone versions, there is an automatic aim mode. Depending on the game mode, projectiles may fly in a straight line off the screen or be affected by gravity. The game ends when the player falls to the bottom of the screen, jumps into a monster, gets sucked into a black hole, or is abducted by a UFO.

Players can choose from different themes, including Original, Christmas, Halloween, Rainforest, Space, Soccer World Cup, Underwater, Easter, Ice Blizzard, Retro Arcade, Ninja, or Pirate. The themes change the Doodler's costume, his enemies, and the background. In the Ninja, Pirate, Halloween, and Easter themes, players can buy new skins and extra lives with coins collected during gameplay or purchased using real-world money. As an easter egg, players may enter the name of a Pocket God pygmy, and the Doodler will turn into one. Alternatively, entering the name "Bunny" will cause the Doodler to wear a bunny suit found in the Easter theme.

== Development ==
Igor and Marko Pušenjak are the authors of Doodle Jump; Igor works from a New York–based address and Marko resides in Croatia. In July 2016, Lima Sky announced a partnership with Skillz to develop a tournament-playable version of the game.

== Release ==
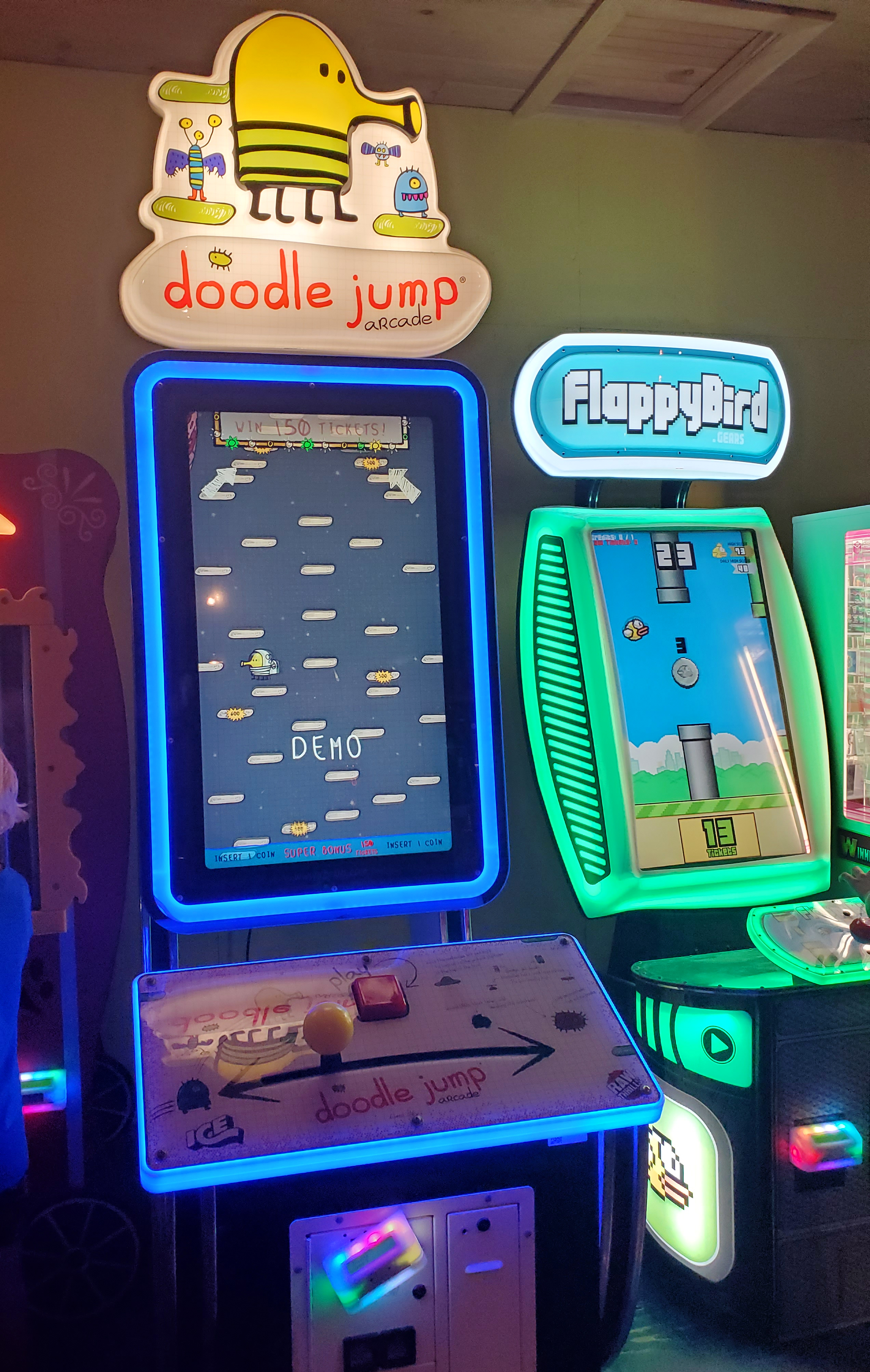
Arcade version of Doodle Jump

There are separate apps for iOS; Doodle Jump Christmas Special, a Christmas theme, Doodle Jump Hop, an Easter theme where the player character is E.B. from the film Hop, and Doodle Jump SpongeBob SquarePants, where the player character is the eponymous character. On June 28, 2013, Doodle Jump was released for Kinect on the Xbox 360.

An arcade version of Doodle Jump was developed by ICE and Raw Thrills, and subsequently released in 2012.

A playable TV game version of Doodle Jump was developed by Gametree TV (now known as Play.Works).

== Reception ==
Doodle Jump has received favorable reviews from critics, with TouchGen mentioning the fact that the game is "fun as heck" and also praising the sound and cartoon graphics which they feel give the game charm. The review ends by saying that the game is a 'joy to play' and that it's obvious that a 'lot of love went into this game'. Tom Love of Pocket Gamer called the game "unbelievably addictive, immediately accessible, and enjoyable every time you pick it up". It currently holds a rating of 85.00% based on six reviews on GameRankings.

=== Legacy ===
The Doodler has made cameo appearances in several other iPhone games, such as Parachute Panic, The Creeps, Finger Physics, and Pocket God.

The game was mentioned in passing by Sheldon Cooper on The Big Bang Theory, and Pocket Gamer speculated that the game reached one million downloads shortly after as a result.

In 2012, the telecommunications company Sprint ran a commercial featuring Kevin Durant that implies a viewer missing a winning shot because they had used up all their data plan quota by downloading Doodle Jump.

== See also ==
- List of most downloaded Android applications
