= Food Network (disambiguation) =

Food Network is an American cable television network.

Food Network may also refer to:

- Food Network (Canada), a television channel
- Food Network (New Zealand), a television channel
- The New Zealand Food Network, a food distribution charity founded by Deborah Manning
- 7food network, a former Australian television channel
- SBS Food, an Australian television channel, formerly branded Food Network
- Food Network Asia, a cable television channel in Asia
- Food Network Magazine, published by Hearst Magazines
- Food Network: Cook or Be Cooked, a 2009 video game based on Food Network's television programs

== See also ==
- Food chain, a concept in ecological science
- Carlton Food Network, a defunct British cable television network
- Good Food, a defunct British television network merged by Discovery with Food Network UK
- Asian Food Network, an Asian pay TV channel formerly known as Asian Food Channel
- Flavour Network, a Canadian television channel formerly known as Food Network
