= Frozen Codebase =

Video game developer

- Company type: Video game developer
- Industry: Video games
- Founded: 2006
- Defunct: January 1, 2012
- Headquarters: Green Bay, Wisconsin, U.S.
- Key people: Ben Geisler, Norb Rozek, Adam Larson, James Lupiani, Jesse Rahikainen, Justin Kovac, Billy Sweetman
- Number of employees: 24
- Website: http://www.frozencodebase.com/

Frozen Codebase was an American independent video game developer founded in 2006 by Ben Geisler. The company developed games for Xbox 360, Microsoft Windows, PlayStation 3, Wii and WiiWare.

== History ==
On May 16, 2008, Frozen Codebase and the Women's Flat Track Derby Association (WFTDA), announced a license agreement for Frozen Codebase to produce a video game based upon the sport of Roller Derby.

On July 22, 2009, Konami and Adult Swim announced that Frozen Codebase is the developer of the Metalocalypse video game Metalocalypse: Dethgame, a PS3 and Xbox 360 downloadable game. Dethgame was previewed at Comic Con 2009. But in July 2010, the game was confirmed to be cancelled by publisher Konami Digital Entertainment "in light of creative differences".

In early 2012, Frozen Codebase was liquidated by ZyQuest, and quickly reformed as Zymo Entertainment, LLC, a wholly owned subsidiary of ZyQuest Inc.

As of early 2015, a handful of Frozen Codebase veterans have formed a game consulting company known as Thawed Codebase. Among Thawed Codebase's credited contract work includes Batman: Arkham Origins.

== Games ==
- Screwjumper! — Xbox Live Arcade (2007)
- Elements of Destruction — Xbox Live Arcade, PC (2008)
- Sandy Beach - WiiWare (2009)
- Zombie Wranglers — Xbox Live Arcade (2009)
- Cruise Ship Vacation Games / Cruise Ship Resort — Wii (2009 / 2010)
- Kick-Ass: The Game — iPhone, PlayStation Network (2010)
- BurgerTime World Tour — WiiWare, Xbox Live Arcade, PSN (2011)
- Scarygirl — PlayStation Network, Xbox Live Arcade (2012)
- Metalocalypse: Dethgame - Xbox Live Arcade, PSN (Cancelled)
