= Elements of Destruction =

2007 video game

- Developers: Frozen Codebase (XBLA/PC); Black Lantern Studios (DS)
- Publisher: THQ
- Platforms: Windows, Xbox 360 (XBLA), Nintendo DS
- Release: DS: NA: December 19, 2007; EU: March 20, 2009; Windows; May 1, 2008; XBLA; June 18, 2008
- Genre: Strategy game
- Modes: Single-player, Multiplayer

Elements of Destruction is a video game developed by Frozen Codebase and Black Lantern Studios for Windows, Nintendo DS and Xbox 360.

== Plot ==
=== Nintendo DS version ===
Marty Storm, a gifted meteorologist gets terminated from his employment for accurately predicting severe weather events. He was fired because he refused to deliberately falsify weather reports to increase the weather station's ratings. Marty vowed to seek retribution against the weather station and began formulating a plan for revenge. Using a weather machine capable of manipulating the weather, Marty begins to wreak havoc within the span of three weeks until his eventual arrest by General Bradley Steele.

=== Xbox 360 and PC version ===
Dr. Edgar Herbert was a top research scientist with a keen yet unbalanced intellect who worked for the AIC for years, until his employer tried to kill him by dropping him in the Atlantic, far from civilization. Washing up on an island, he discovered an old nuclear testing facility on it and repurposes an experimental device once used to energize weather control satellites, allowing him to turn himself into living energy capable of manipulating the elements. Using his newfound powers, the doctor swears revenge on the company.

== Gameplay ==
Elements of Destruction gameplay screenshot.

The game takes place in towns with an aerial view, and the objective for the player is to cause as much destruction as possible by controlling tornadoes, lightning storms, and starting earthquakes, while dodging AIC enemies and refilling your health through recharge stations. On the levels, the player must fulfill a set of goals within a time limit to complete the missions.

=== Nintendo DS version ===
Elements of Destruction on the Nintendo DS is played in a isometric perspective in which the player utilizes the Nintendo DS' stylus to manipulate the various natural disasters that Marty Storm can create. At the start of each level, players begin with a limited amount of energy points and must cause destruction to obtain energy. The game is divided up into three weeks with varied objectives ranging from causing a large amount of property damage to destroying a percentage of buildings. Should the player fail a mission in this particular version, the game over sequence would depict calm weather with cheerful music and chirping birds.

== Reception ==
Reception

Aggregate score
Aggregator	Score
Metacritic	(DS) 72/100 (X360) 65/100

Review scores
Publication	Score
Eurogamer	6/10
GamePro	4.5/5
GameSpot	6.5/10
IGN	(X360) 7.9/10 (DS) 7/10
Official Xbox Magazine (US)	4/10
TeamXbox	7.8/10

The DS and Xbox 360 versions received "mixed or average reviews" according to the review aggregation website Metacritic.
