= Screwjumper! =

2007 video game

- Developer: Frozen Codebase
- Publisher: THQ
- Platform: Xbox 360 (XBLA)
- Release: November 14, 2007
- Genre: Action game
- Modes: Single-player, multiplayer

Screwjumper! is an action video game for the Xbox 360 via Xbox Live Arcade, developed by Frozen Codebase and published by THQ. The game was released on November 14, 2007. The game was the 100th game released by THQ for the Xbox Live Arcade service.

It was removed from Xbox Live Arcade in 2012 and is no longer available to purchase, though it later became compatible on the Xbox One and Xbox Series X/S via backwards compatibility on November 15, 2021, despite still being unavailable.

Typical gameplay screenshot.

== Gameplay ==
The game features 20 mines on four different planets, and has a single player mode with four gameplay styles including Score, Time Trial, Destruction and Race. A multiplayer game is done on split screen or on Xbox Live.

== Plot ==
The game takes place underground where the player must destroy the mining equipment of an alien invasion. Players can control six different characters, including Skruii, Filch, Zyree, Xoona, Ula, and Zomar.

== Development ==
On October 24, 2007 THQ announced they were working on four new Xbox Live games, including Screwjumper!.

== Reception ==
Reception

Aggregate score
| Aggregator | Score |
|---|---|
| Metacritic | 40/100 |

Review scores
| Publication | Score |
|---|---|
| Eurogamer | 4/10 |
| IGN | 4/10 |
| Jeuxvideo.com | 7/20 |
| Official Xbox Magazine (US) | 7/10 |
| TeamXbox | 4.7/10 |

The game received "unfavorable" reviews according to the review aggregation website Metacritic. IGN cited the game's manifold problems with sound, dated graphics, and short game length.
