= Metal Drift =

- Developer: Black Jacket Studios
- Publisher: Black Jacket Studios
- Engine: Torque Game Engine Advanced
- Platform: Microsoft Windows
- Release: NA: October 22, 2009
- Genre: vehicular combat
- Modes: Single-player, multiplayer

Metal Drift is a vehicular combat game for Microsoft Windows developed and published by Black Jacket Studios. It features an arcade racing style that incorporates elements of a first person shooter. It is set in a fictional world in an alternate future.

== Gameplay ==
Metal Drift's gameplay is focused on online multiplayer. Players compete with up to 11 others in 6vs6 battles. There is one "Capture the Flag" type mode where players fight for possession of a ball which is used to score at the opponents goal. The game focuses heavily on team play, awarding points for kill assists and helping a teammate score a goal. Points are also given for kills and goals, as well as multipliers for kill streaks. During games with less than 12 human players "bots" controlled by the server will fill any remaining slots.

Metal Drift features a level system to unlock new weapons and upgrades. Players start at level 0 and can progress up to level 40, with unlocks every 3 level ups. New tank skins are also unlocked as the player levels up, with a new skin at level 20 and also level 40. All CPU controlled "bots" use the default level 0 skin, and Community Leaders are granted black "VIP" skins.

While being multiplayer based, Metal Drift also has a single player version against CPU controlled opponents. Singleplayer behaves exactly like multiplayer, with some extra options on game setup. The player can choose the level of difficulty as well as the number of opponents to play against. All the maps in the game are available from the start, giving new players the ability to practice on any of the different Drift Decks. Beyond singleplayer there is also support for multiplayer LAN games, allowing up to 12 people to play the game together on a private network.

== Early Development ==
Beta access for Metal Drift started in late 2008 with the game being distributed over email to a small group of beta testers. Starting in early 2009 people interested in the game could apply for a copy on the official forums. Testing sessions were held with the developers to find bugs and flaws in the game, as well as get opinions on new or existing features. Before being officially released on Steam, there was a public beta allowing anyone who pre-purchased the game at a discounted rate to get early access.

== Continued Development ==
Metal Drift was still actively developed 2 years after its official release. A re-release was announced on February 16, 2011. This update fixed many critical bugs and added new tank skins to the game that could be unlocked at certain player levels. New official multiplayer servers were added to allow better gameplay to regions in Europe. Since then several updates have been released, revamping the Heads Up Display and fixing bugs.

As of December 2011 a new map called Javelin is being developed for release sometime in 2012. It will be the first map featuring the Waste texture set, opposed to the Metro textures used by previous maps. Javelin will include several new features unseen on other maps such as boost pads and walls that allow players to shoot through them.

Metal Drift has not received any news or updates since a time after the release of the Javelin map, and development seems to have come to a complete halt.

== Distribution ==
Metal Drift was available only on the Steam platform when first released on October 22, 2009. In early 2011 availability spread to other online digital distribution platforms such as Direct2Drive and Desura. There are currently no physical copies of the game, with availability exclusive to digital distribution methods.

== Reception ==
Metal Drift received generally favorable reviews, however some critics found flaws with some aspects of gameplay. Out of 8 called the leveling system an artificial handicap that is "A strategic disadvantage right from the beginning." However, ItReviews found the tactical teamwork and varying combinations of tank setups "Immensely fun to play" Dan Fedler from Gamasutra praised the use of scenes in the game, saying Metal Drift was "One of the most exciting and dynamic games I’ve come across in months."
