= Black Sigil: Blade of the Exiled =

2009 video game

- North American box art
- Developer: Studio Archcraft
- Publisher: Graffiti Entertainment
- Composer: Jan Morgenstern
- Platform: Nintendo DS
- Release: NA: June 9, 2009
- Genre: Role-playing
- Mode: Single-player

Black Sigil: Blade of the Exiled is a role-playing video game for the Nintendo DS developed by Studio Archcraft, a video game developer which is based in Montreal, Quebec, Canada. Black Sigil was published by Graffiti Entertainment on June 9, 2009. The game was originally planned for release on Nintendo's Game Boy Advance system, but Studio Archcraft made the decision to move the game to the Nintendo DS as by the time the game was nearing completion, the GBA market was starting to dry up. In the years leading up to its release, it went by the early title Project Exile.

== Plot ==
Bel Lenora is a magical kingdom where everyone can use magic. A long time ago, a man who could not use magic named Vai entered Bel Lenora and brought about a great tragedy. At high cost to the kingdom, Vai was banished by one of the kingdom's Generals. Fifteen years after that event, a young man named Kairu ventures into Bel Lenora, and it is found that he is also unable to use magic.

== Gameplay ==
Black Sigil: Blade of the Exiled is fully compatible with the DS touch screen and stylus. Players can choose to play the game completely using simple button, the stylus, or a combination of both. The game follows the traditional console RPG format dividing the game into different segments of exploration, combat, and plot scenes. The game allows for traditional data recording via "save points" as well as a quick-save feature which can be used at any time (but is not as reliable as a "real save"). An interview with Graffiti at E3 2009 confirmed that the game has seven endings along with many sidequests and NPC dialogue that changes each time the lead character changes.

=== Combat ===
The game is a console styled RPG, and features the traditional turn-based combat style that usually accompanies the genre. Where Black Sigil differs from most RPGs is its attempts to add a tactical aspect by requiring players to observe the positions of their characters and enemies in the field. Seven of the eight characters have a predetermined skill-set, and the eighth can be customized. Enemies are not visible during exploration as the game uses the traditional random encounter format.

=== Geography ===
Players can travel on the world map in various vehicles that are found throughout the game.

== Characters ==
Kairu seen here sparring with a Student

Kairu is the game's protagonist is a calm and collected young swordsman in the service of Duke Averay, the man who defeated the "magicless" General Vai long before the events of the game. A war-orphan taken in by the duke, but is unable to use magic which causes the people of Bel Lenora to mock him and view him as a threat. He only seems to open up to his younger sister, Aurora. By orders of the King, Kairu is eventually exiled into the cave Vai was banished to after his defeat. The duke hands him the Averay blade before sealing the cave. Aurora is the daughter of Duke Averay; an assertive, and strong-willed, sorceress. Aurora usually looks out for her adopted brother, Kairu, even going as far as using her magic on those who insult him in her presence. When he is banished from Bel Lenora, she follows him into exile.

The two meet a variety of different characters in their journey. Nephi is a smooth-tongued stranger Kairu and Aurora run into at the beginning of their journey through Artania. He appears interested in Averay's sword that Kairu wields. Nephi helps the pair numerous times, and seems to especially care for Aurora, but he vanishes mysteriously over and over again. Isa is a white-haired woman who wields magic in the world of Artania, and currently works as a commander in the Genufan army. The Sammarkans refer to her as the "witch" but repeatedly fail to capture her. Isa is quiet and aloof, but becomes especially sensitive whenever the subject of her home village is brought up. Vai is the only other person known in Bel Lenora to have no ability to use magic at all. 15 years before the beginning of the game, he betrayed Bel Lenora and led an army of demons and their worshippers against the kingdom. He is a playable character as a member of the party. Rogurd is a hearty treasure hunter who claims to be the best at the trade. He is originally an upperclassman from the town of Tradefair. Rogurd ventures the land in search of a treasure he refers to as "IT". He has a rival named Gavin, who is also something of a friend, and the two repeatedly bump into each other in their hunt for "IT". Rogurd helps Kairu's group a couple of times before joining them. Nym is a young Ashen Eye with the special ability to use summons in battles. Doll, an optional party member, exists in the form of a living Doll open to wide customization. Doll's skill set is determined by what he has equipped. He is found in the doll factory east of the house of white stone entrance in the corridor of clouds.

== Development and release ==
The game was originally in development for the Game Boy Advance, but development expanded well beyond its lifespan, eventually moving to the Nintendo DS, where it released in 2009. The world of Black Sigil is quite large and contains anywhere from 50-60 locations. Over 1000 maps were made when the game was in production.

== Reception ==
Reception

Aggregate score
Aggregator	Score
Metacritic	58/100

Review scores
Publication	Score
Destructoid	3/10
Edge	5/10
GameRevolution	D+
GameSpot	6.5/10
GamesRadar+	3.5/5
GameZone	7.3/10
IGN	5.5/10
Nintendo Power	5/10
The A.V. Club	C

The game received "mixed" reviews according to video game review aggregator Metacritic.
