= FIFA 10 =

2009 video game

- UK and Ireland cover featuring Arsenal's Theo Walcott, Manchester United's Wayne Rooney and Chelsea's Frank Lampard
- Developers: EA Canada (Xbox 360, PS3, Wii); HB Studios (PC, PSP, PS2); Exient Entertainment (NDS)
- Publisher: EA Sports
- Producers: David Rutter; Kaz Makita; Paul Hossack; Andrew Wilson
- Series: FIFA
- Platforms: Microsoft Windows Consoles: Wii PlayStation 2 PlayStation 3 Xbox 360; Handhelds and Mobile: PlayStation Portable Nintendo DS iOS Android Java ME
- Release: AU: 1 October 2009; EU: 2 October 2009; NA: 20 October 2009; iOS: WW: 2 October 2009
- Genre: Sports
- Modes: Single-player, multiplayer

FIFA 10 (titled FIFA Soccer 10 in North America) is a football simulation video game developed by EA Canada and published by Electronic Arts worldwide under the EA Sports label. It was released on 2 October 2009 in Europe, 1 October in Australasia and 20 October 2009 in North America. It is available for the PlayStation 3, Xbox 360, Microsoft Windows, PlayStation 2 and Wii. Handheld versions of the game were also released for the iOS, Nintendo DS, PlayStation Portable, and Mobile Phones.

The demo of FIFA 10 appeared on PlayStation 3, Xbox 360, and Windows on 10 September in Europe, on 11 September in Australia, and on 17 September in North America. The playable teams were Chelsea, Barcelona, Juventus, Bayern Munich, Marseille and Chicago Fire. The stadia used in the demo were Wembley Stadium (Xbox 360 version), and FIWC Stadium (PlayStation 3 version). The demo offered friendly matches with half lengths of three real-time minutes. As well as playing a friendly match, the demo allows users to upload created in-game videos and screenshots to EA Football World. The tagline for the game is "How big can soccer get?", and "Let's FIFA 10". Commentary is available in 12 languages, with each language boasting around 25,000 phrases. The English language version features British commentators Martin Tyler and Andy Gray, while the PC, PS2, Wii, and PSP platforms feature Clive Tyldesley and Andy Gray.

FIFA 10 is the second version of the game to sponsor a football club. Along with football magazine FourFourTwo, FIFA 10 is the co-sponsor of English League One club Swindon Town. The FIFA 10 logo appears on the front of the team's away shirt and on the back of the home shirt. It is the first FIFA game to do so since FIFA 07, which sponsored Accrington Stanley for the 2007–08 season. It was also the last FIFA game to be released in October until FIFA 21 in 2020.

== Manager Mode ==
Manager Mode enables the player to take charge of any club in any of FIFA 10's featured leagues.

The Manager Mode has been revamped for FIFA 10, with many previous issues and criticisms addressed. EA has claimed that over 50 key improvements have been made to the PlayStation 3 and Xbox 360 versions. Among these improvements are:

=== Gameplay changes ===
The "Total Football Experience" is a new feature in which football news from around the Manager Mode world is visible, including player transfers, fixtures and results in foreign leagues. A new "Assistant Manager" can be used to take care of the team's line-up and to rotate the squad based on importance of the upcoming match. For example, if the next match is against a low rated team, he will make sure that players normally on the bench will start the match. Pre-season friendlies have been introduced to the Xbox 360 and PlayStation 3 versions of the game, as a chance to flatten out any wrinkles in a team's lineup before the domestic season begins.

Results for simulated matches are more heavily based on team strength and do not appear to be as "random" as has been the case in the past. This results in more realistic performances and eliminates instances where stronger clubs would be fighting relegation and clubs with weaker players were winning the league. Non-player clubs also now rotate players more often based on factors such as fatigue, player form, and the relative importance of a match, so the lineup for a top team in the early rounds of a domestic cup may consist of less-able and younger players as opposed to a full-strength squad. The names of the "generic" stadia can be changed in Manager Mode to reflect the name of the player's club's home ground.

An in-game screenshot highlighting the improved transfer system in Manager Mode

==== Finances ====
All financial matters are based less on a team sponsor and more on the club's board of directors, who provide two overall budgets: The wage budget, a yearly amount for paying players, and the club budget, for buying and selling players as well as making other improvements to the club. There is a "Board Difficulty" setting, which determines the financial generosity of the board.

The transfer system has been made more authentic, as money is no longer the monopolising factor in acquiring a player. The acceptance of an offer will be based on factors such as the number of players in the squad in the same position. If the club accepts, the manager has the choice of which, if any, of the players to ultimately sign.

==== Players ====
The "Player Experience and Growth System" has changed. The manual experience growth from FIFA 08 and FIFA 09 has been abolished; player growth will now be determined by in-game performance, demands placed on the player, and achievements based on the player's particular position. There are three categories for gaining experience: "mental", "physical", and "skill". Younger players with higher potential will gain experience much faster, and each player will have an individual growth point, which in turn promises more authentic player growth patterns.

A "Live Season" feature has been implemented within Manager Mode, whereby a player's "form" rises and falls based on performance (within Manager Mode itself rather than real-world events). He will receive a temporarily higher or lower rating along with temporarily higher or lower stats, to reflect this.

Fictional players that are added to Manager Mode by the game itself now have regionalised names, so for example a player from Brazil will not have an English-sounding name.

== Virtual Pro ==
"Virtual Pro" allows the player to create a footballer and take him through the four Be a Pro seasons, include him in the Manager Mode career, use him in Kick off, Tournament, and Lounge mode, as well as using him in the Arena. Game Face has also been added to FIFA 10 as in other EA Sports games, where gamers can create their Game Face on the web at easports.com or easportsfootball.co.uk, then download them into the game. Once a Game Face character is created, he can then be applied to the player in game. Faces can be changed on the web any time. The game face is used as the player's avatar in online play. Players can also grow their players attributes and player traits, celebrations, and kit can be unlocked to make the player realistic and unique. A created player can also be taken online to play with friends in the FIFA Clubs mode.

== Stadia ==
The list of stadia and weather conditions for each one were announced on 27 August 2009. The game features 50 stadia, including most of the larger stadia from Europe's most prominent leagues, such as the Allianz Arena, Camp Nou, Emirates Stadium, Anfield, Old Trafford, Stamford Bridge and San Siro, and as well as a range of generic stadia and practice arenas. Real Madrid's Santiago Bernabéu was made available as a free download on launch day. The weather conditions possible in each stadium range from day and night versions of clear to cloudy, rain, or snow.

The stadium names of the generic stadia, however, can be changed in a special section of the main menu to reflect the name of the users club's home ground if the user chooses to do so. The capacity of each ground is also listed so that a capacity similar to a club's actual stadium capacity can be chosen to make game experience more authentic.

== Ultimate Team ==
On 1 December 2009, EA Sports announced that the Ultimate Team game mode expansion that was introduced in FIFA 09 would be released in February 2010 for the PlayStation 3 and Xbox 360 versions of the game. Like the previous version, the mode allows for the creation of a custom team based on the collection of various types of cards. The expansion was released on 25 February 2010, and featured new PlayStation Network Trophies and Xbox Live Achievements for FIFA 10. It costs 400 MS Points/$4.99/€4.99/£3.99.

The mode is an update to the Ultimate Team mode from FIFA 09. Users who owned the original Ultimate Team were given two free Gold packs after creating their team, along with a date below the team's name to show the year the team was founded. Like the original, each team is given a full team of players to begin with, along with a stadium, emblem and a home and away kit. New players, staff and items can be purchased from the 6 pack types available, split into three categories (Gold, Silver and Bronze), or by trading with other users by bidding on cards they are opting to sell, offering them deals or buying them for a specific price. The in-game currency is coins, which are awarded for playing games, playing in tournaments or trading with other users. Bonus coins are awarded for completing different requirements, such as winning a game, being awarded Man of the Match and for possession and passing accuracy. The card packs for Ultimate Team still have basic Bronze Packs (500 coins), Silver Packs (2500 coins) and Gold Packs (5000 Coins), but now also have a bonus pack in each category, called Premium Packs, costing slightly more coins (Bronze cost 750, Silver cost 3250 and Gold cost 7500) but giving 3 rare cards, instead of the 1 given in basic packs.

Like the old Ultimate Team, players are given contracts. Players who run out of contracts are rendered unplayable until a contract is applied to them, rather than being removed from the team altogether. Contracts can be found in packs or bought in the trading section. Unlike the old Ultimate Team, players can now store an unlimited number of players, stadia, staff members, kits and emblems, to use whenever they need to. The Trading section has also been improved, allowing improved searching and a watch list, to keep track of certain items.

== Covers ==
Each regional version of FIFA 10 features different players on the cover with Wayne Rooney being on most. The version for both Ireland and the United Kingdom features Theo Walcott, Frank Lampard and Wayne Rooney on the cover; the Australian cover features Wayne Rooney and Tim Cahill; the New Zealand cover features Wayne Rooney and Frank Lampard; the German cover features Bastian Schweinsteiger and Wayne Rooney; the Italian cover features Ronaldinho and Giorgio Chiellini; the French cover features Steve Mandanda, Karim Benzema, and Guillaume Hoarau; the Spanish cover features Karim Benzema and Xavi; the Polish version features Wayne Rooney and Robert Lewandowski; the Portuguese version features Frank Lampard and Simão; the Hungarian version features Wayne Rooney and Balázs Dzsudzsák; and the North American version features Frank Lampard, Cuauhtémoc Blanco and Sacha Kljestan. The European versions feature the Stade Maurice Dufrasne as the background.

== Leagues and teams ==
There are 30 leagues and over 500 teams in the game, as well as 41 national teams. New to FIFA 10 is the Russian Premier League, which is not featured in the PlayStation 3 and Xbox 360 versions. Unlike previous versions of FIFA, the Netherlands is included as a fully licensed national team. Due to promotion/relegation and other league expansions, there are 46 teams that were not included in FIFA 09, including 25 that have never appeared in a FIFA game before.

FIFA 10 has 41 teams in its international division. The most notable exclusion is Japan (who made it into the round of 16 in the 2002 World Cup and the 2010 World Cup, but whose licensing rights currently belong to Konami). The following international teams are playable in the current generation consoles. But not all the teams are fully licensed e.g. South Africa and Russia.

== Reception ==
=== Commercial ===
According to EA, the latest edition in FIFA series is the fastest selling sports game ever in Europe, selling 1.7 million copies in its first week. FIFA 10 sales could rise as much as 30 percent year-over-year in Europe, making FIFA the most profitable EA Sports title, thanks to its global audience and lower license costs, compared to the Madden series. It is the biggest All Formats No1 launch since Grand Theft Auto IV, generating 48% more sales than its predecessor, FIFA 09 edging past Grand Theft Auto: San Andreas.

It has sold over 10 million units since launch.

=== Critical reception ===
Reception

Aggregate scores
Aggregator	Score
GameRankings	90.25% (PS3); 89% (X360); 83.57% (PSP); 76.14% (Wii); 70% (DS)
Metacritic	90/100

Review scores
Publication	Score
1Up.com	B
Eurogamer	9/10
GameSpot	9/10
GameTrailers	9.1/10
IGN	9/10
Official Nintendo Magazine	84%

FIFA 10 has received high critical acclaim, with a 90% aggregate rating at Metacritic and a 89% aggregate rating on GameRankings. The first review was a 9/10 from PlayStation Official Magazine (UK), commenting "This not only plays the best on-the-pitch football of any FIFA title, but it has an incredibly smart and compelling way of tying it all together, too. Brilliant, again."

IGN UK gave the game a rating of 9.3/10 for both PlayStation 3 and Xbox 360 versions commenting "One of the most refined, polished and compelling takes on the beautiful game – and arguably of any given sport. While this year's improvements might seem slight on paper, each one is perfectly pitched and works together to create an experience that's an improvement on last year's game in every conceivable way."

GameSpot gave it a 9/10, saying "FIFA 10 offers the best gameplay in the series' history and includes even more features and game modes to boot." It also earned the "Editor's Choice Award" for both PlayStation 3 and Xbox 360 versions.

The Wii version was given an 84% rating by Official Nintendo Magazine praising the exclusive art style and game boosters. Shortly after release, the Xbox 360 and PlayStation 3 versions of FIFA 10 came in for some criticism for containing various bugs, mostly related to the game's Manager Mode. A downloadable patch was issued in mid October to fix issues ranging from players being sold without permission to connection problems online.

During the 13th Annual Interactive Achievement Awards, the Academy of Interactive Arts & Sciences awarded FIFA 10 with "Sports Game of the Year".
