= Jurassic: The Hunted =

2009 video game

- Developer: Cauldron HQ
- Publisher: Activision
- Engine: CloakNT
- Platforms: PlayStation 2, PlayStation 3, Wii, Xbox 360
- Release: NA: November 3, 2009
- Genre: First-person shooter

Jurassic: The Hunted is a first-person shooter video game developed by Cauldron HQ and published by Activision. The game was released exclusively in the United States on November 3, 2009, less than three weeks after being announced. It was published for the Xbox 360, Wii, PlayStation 2, and PlayStation 3. Jurassic: The Hunted received mixed reviews from critics.

== Plot ==
The player takes control of former Navy Seal Craig Dylan as he accompanies his war buddy Amando "Rock" Depiedra, and scientist Sabrina Sayrus to the Bermuda Triangle searching for Sabrina's father, Dr. James Sayrus. The trio are forced to jump out of the plane after a vortex interferes with the plane. Each jumps through a different vortex, landing in a different place in the Bermuda Triangle.

Dylan is forced to trek across the island, passing a beached cargo ship and volcano, and encountering several dinosaurs and items from various time periods, before discovering a fort that has been maintained by the missing Dr. Sayrus, Sabrina's father, as well as Rock, who was marooned on the island years before Dylan and is now past his prime. Dr. Sayrus warns Dylan of an impending disaster and instructs him to find a Temporal Vortex Engine (TVE) that will allow them to return to their own time, located in a German submarine in a cave.

Dylan finds the TVE and while returning to the fort, meets up with Sabrina again, who is being chased by a massive Spinosaurus, nicknamed "Spike." A Tyrannosaurus arrives and fights Spike but is easily overpowered and killed when Spike snaps its neck.

Dylan and Sabrina manage to escape and return to the fort, only to learn that the uranium battery that powers the TVE no longer works. Dylan manages to recover another battery from a drone that apparently arrived on the island via a temporal vortex from the future and returns to the fort, but the Spike attacks again. Dylan fends him off while Dr. Sayrus repairs the TVE, allowing Dylan and Sabrina to escape while he and Rock remain to fight off Spike.

Emerging on a sandy beach, Dylan and Sabrina ponder what to do next until another portal opens up, and Dr. Sayrus and Rock emerge of the repaired submarine one year after Dylan and Sabrina returned, with the apparently dead Spike tied to the hull.

As the game ends, Spike opens his eye, ending on a cliffhanger.

== Creatures ==
- Velociraptor
- Deinonychus
- Dilophosaurus
- Utahraptor
- Pachycephalosaurus
- Triceratops
- Brachiosaurus
- Tyrannosaurus
- Spinosaurus

Others

- Brontoscorpio
- Cearadactylus
- Ornithocheirus

== Gameplay ==
Combat encounters include arena style fights, fortification sieges, survival modes and boss battles. Adrenaline bursts give an edge by allowing the player to visualize and then target an opponent's weak point such as the heart, lungs, brain, ribcage, backbone, liver, and intestines in slow motion.

== Reception ==
Reception

Review scores
| Publication | Score |
|---|---|
| IGN | 6/10 (PS2/Wii); 6.5/10 (PS3/360) |
| Jeuxvideo.com | 13/20 (PS3/360) |
| Nintendo World Report | 5/10 (Wii) |
| Official Xbox Magazine (US) | 5/10 (360) |

Jurassic: The Hunted was criticized for its large number of Velociraptor enemies. Jeff Haynes of IGN wrote, "Yes, they were scary in Jurassic Park, but after blasting through your fourth pack of raptors, it simply becomes a nuisance. You couldn't throw in a rampaging Stegosaurus to switch things up?" Evan Lahti of Official Xbox Magazine wrote, "Like most budget games, its greatest sin is repetition: throwing waves of dinos at you with no real sense of design or difficulty".

Zachary Miller of Nintendo World Report reviewed the Wii version and wrote "even though it's initially a lot of fun, Jurassic: The Hunted gets bogged down by technical problems, and repetitious missions and dinosaur types. [...] there are entirely too many raptors interspersed by the occasional badly-rendered Jurassic Park-style dilophosaur. Big bossasaurs are few and far in between, and when they do appear, they're so overpowered that it's hard to enjoy the battle". He also wrote that "many dinosaurs bizarrely teleport into the environment right in front of you."

Jeuxvideo.com praised the music and graphics, while others were critical of the latter. Haynes praised its "Survivor" mode, and referred to its "Cheesy B-movie dialogue" as "amusing". Michael McWhertor of Kotaku wrote, "While this budget title lacks much of the polish, production value, and creative vision that defines most current-gen shooters, there's no denying the dumb, B-movie-fueled fun you'll have picking off prehistoric beasties in this way under-the-radar release".
