= Grey's Anatomy: The Video Game =

2009 video game

- Developer(s): Longtail Studios
- Publisher(s): Ubisoft
- Director(s): A. J. Morales
- Producer(s): Jeff Lindsey, Kevin Simon
- Programmer(s): Vincent Martineau
- Writer(s): Sam Strachman
- Platform(s): Nintendo DS, Wii, Windows
- Release: NA: March 10, 2009; AU: March 12, 2009; EU: March 13, 2009 (DS & Wii)
- Genre(s): Visual novel, puzzle
- Mode(s): Single-player

Grey's Anatomy: The Video Game is a game developed by Longtail Studios and published by Ubisoft in collaboration with ABC Studios. It was released in March 2009 for Nintendo DS, Wii, and Windows. The game is set during the fourth season of the medical drama Grey's Anatomy in an original storyline in which the doctors have to deal with a diphtheria outbreak. The game takes the form of a visual novel interspersed with minigames.

== Gameplay ==
The game is split into five episodes, each themselves split into smaller acts and scenes. The player switches character each scene and plays a different minigame, which are either a medical procedure (such as a surgery or changing dressing) or based on controlling emotions, such as "flicking away doubts" or controlling breathing with a rhythm game.

== Plot ==
The game's main plot revolves around an outbreak of diphtheria at Seattle Grace hospital, forcing the characters to remain in quarantine in the hospital. Each of the main characters also have their own subplots, with Derek and Meredith's mostly focusing on their relationship, Cristina's attempting to secure a fellowship and having a new love interest created specifically for the game in Dr. Vince Bennet, and Bailey worrying about her new son.

== Reception ==
Reception

Aggregate scores
Aggregator	Score		
Aggregator	DS	PC	Wii
GameRankings	50.40%	34.50%	60.17%
Metacritic	47/100	36/100	65/100

Review scores
Publication	Score		
Publication	DS	PC	Wii
GameZone	5/10	N/A	N/A
IGN	6/10	6/10	6.3/10
PC Zone	N/A	9%	N/A

The game received an aggregate score of 36/100 for its Windows version from Metacritic, indicating "generally unfavorable reviews", and a 65/100 for the Wii version, indicating "mixed or average reviews".

IGN gave the game 6/10 points, stating that the storyline was "hilariously random much of the time" while the gameplay was "about as challenging as trying to run into a wall". GamesRadar+ gave the game 1.5/5 stars, also citing the simplicity of the minigames and calling it "bizarre".
