= Ant Nation =

2009 video game

- Developers: Konami; Kou You Sha; Art Co., Ltd
- Publisher: Konami
- Platforms: Wii (WiiWare), Nintendo DS
- Release: WiiWare: NA: July 13, 2009; PAL: June 18, 2010; Nintendo DS: NA: September 8, 2009; PAL: October 9, 2009
- Genre: Real time strategy
- Mode: Single-player

Ant Nation is a real time strategy video game from Konami for WiiWare and Nintendo DS. The WiiWare version was released on July 13, 2009, in North America and the Nintendo DS version was released on September 8, 2009.

== Gameplay ==
In both versions of the game players train a colony of ants to become tough enough to survive various challenges. In the Nintendo DS version, the ants are a genetically engineered species bred to defeat a colony of invading alien ants. The WiiWare version is a sandbox game while the DS version features an expanding mission structure.

Players subject their ants to various dangers such as lightning, fire and heat rays from a magnifying glass to build up their resistance before sending them off on missions to collect food and defeat other insects. While in the WiiWare version the player controlled a swarm of up to hundreds of ants, the DS version is based around a rock-paper-scissors unit mechanic that sees players creating groups of ants with specific resistance to certain dangers.

The WiiWare version contains a bonus mode that involves trying to kill all ants in the level using items such as hammers, lasers and bug spray.

== Reception ==
Nintendo World Report called it "a slow-paced, disturbing affair with little variety", and IGN called the campaign mode shallow and mundane and that game could only briefly entertain "the desperately bored or the blind", while Nintendo Power gave this game one of the lowest rating ever; 2.0.
