= Inkvaders =

2009 video game

- App icon
- Developer(s): Chillingo
- Publisher(s): Chillingo
- Platform(s): iOS
- Release: August 20, 2009
- Genre(s): Side-scrolling shooter
- Mode(s): Single-player

Inkvaders is a 2009 side-scrolling shooter game developed and published by Chillingo. It was released for the App Store on August 20, 2009.

== Gameplay and release ==
Hero shooting Martians

Across thirty levels, the player controls a character named Generic Marine (abbreviated G), who has to defend the Earth on the Moon from a Martian alien invasion. The hero can choose from a laser, a gun, and a rocket launcher as weapons and can use a jet pack. The Martians can only shoot their lasers at close range. The hero can collect power-ups to purchase weapons, ammo, health, and jet pack fuel. After releasing for the App Store on August 20, 2009, it has become unavailable.

== Reception ==
Robert Workman, of Modojo, said that the game reminds him of 1950s sci-fi, has a good soundtrack, and that he enjoys seeing the aliens explode. His problems with it is that the game is repetitive and that the later levels are really hard.

== See also ==
- Mars in fiction
