= 0 Day Attack on Earth =

2009 video game

- Developer: Gulti
- Publisher: Square Enix
- Platform: Xbox 360 (XBLA)
- Release: December 23, 2009
- Genre: Multidirectional shooter
- Modes: Single-player, multiplayer

Reception

Aggregate score
Aggregator	Score
Metacritic	41/100

Review scores
Publication	Score
1Up.com	D
GameSpot	4/10
IGN	4/10
Jeuxvideo.com	8/20
Official Xbox Magazine (US)	50%
TeamXbox	6.5/10

0 Day Attack on Earth is an multidirectional shooter developed by Japanese studio Gulti and published by Square Enix for the Xbox 360. The game was released on December 23, 2009, and revolves around players defending Paris, New York, and Tokyo from an alien assault.

== Gameplay ==
The game is a twin-stick shooter, where the movement is done with the left stick and shooting with the right. There is a main goal in each level, which is to take down a certain number of boss aliens before a timer goes down to zero. However, the skies are also filled with smaller ships, and there are pods and snakes that burst from the ground. Aiding the fight against the enemies are power-ups like spray gun and flame throwers, as well as special abilities like nitro boost that helps moving the ship out of any harm.

0 Day Attack on Earth consists of 28 levels that are split in groups of seven that take place in four cities. Each city is accurately depicted through satellite imagery, containing landmarks like Champs-Élysées, Tokyo Tower, and Arc de Triomphe. One of the features included is co-op play for up to four players (when playing offline, AI-controlled ships will support the player instead). Besides co-op, there are Capture the Flag and Capture Point multiplayer modes.

== Downloadable content ==
On January 13, 2010, the London Map Pack was released. It contains new London-based maps, new enemies and a higher difficulty setting. New maps can be played in the co-op mode but not in the Capture The Flag or Control Point modes.

On February 3, 2010, it was followed up by the Night Missions Map Pack, where the New York, Tokyo and Paris maps are revisited, and the enemy only comes out after sunset, while also being stronger and more difficult to defeat.

== Reception ==
Upon its release, 0 Day Attack on Earth was met with "generally unfavorable" reviews from critics, with an aggregate score of 41% on Metacritic.
