= 3-2-1, Rattle Battle! =

2009 video game

- Developer: Tecmo
- Publisher: Tecmo Koei Games
- Platform: WiiWare
- Release: JP: March 31, 2009; PAL: August 14, 2009; NA: August 31, 2009
- Genre: Action (minigame compilation)
- Mode: Single-player

3-2-1, Rattle Battle!, known in Japan as Atsui 12 Game: Furi Furi Party! (あつい12ゲーム フリフリパーティー！), is a video game for WiiWare developed by Tecmo. It was released in Japan on March 31, 2009, the PAL regions on August 14, 2009 and in North America on August 31, 2009.

== Gameplay ==
3-2-1, Rattle Battle! is a collection of twelve minigames that generally revolve around players shaking the Wii Remote in order to score points. Controlling a blue cartoon mascot named "Rattle Hero", shaking the Wii Remote causes him to perform a different action depending on the minigame. These include firing a laser beam to dispatch enemies, bouncing up and down to weigh down a scale and growing or shrinking in size to dodge a salvo of arrows. Each minigame lasts between just three seconds to around two minutes in length.

The game features online leaderboards for high scores for two of the minigames.

== Development ==
A prototype for 3-2-1, Rattle Battle!, then titled Playshake, was demonstrated at the 2009 Tokyo Game Show. The prototype featured minimal graphics and only a single minigame in which the player had to shake the Wii Remote as many times as they can in three seconds.
