= Geared (video game) =

2009 video game

- Developers: Bryan Mitchell; Playful Art, LLC (PC)
- Publishers: Bryan Mitchell; Playful Art, LLC (PC)
- Platforms: iOS, Microsoft Windows, Android
- Release: Geared: WW: August 8, 2009 (iPhone); WW: May 1, 2010 (iPad); WW: May 15, 2015; Geared 2! December 16, 2010
- Genre: Puzzle game
- Mode: Single-player

Geared was an iOS game by American developer Bryan Mitchell. It was released on August 8, 2009. A sequel entitled Geared 2! was released December 16, 2010. Both games were later discontinued.

== Critical reception ==
MEGamers gave Geared 81/100, writing " A very unique, enjoyable experience when compared to the crowd of other puzzle games available on this platform. Definitely worth your time and money. " GamePro gave it an 80%, commented "Geared won't tickle your brain in quite the same way that Portal could, but it's an excellent iPad game that comes at a great price."

Geared 2! had a metacritic score of 84% based on 5 critic reviews.
