= The Polynomial: Space of the Music =

2009 video game

- Developer(s): Dmytry Lavrov
- Publisher(s): Dmytry Lavrov
- Platform(s): Windows, Linux, Mac OS X (10.6 and later)
- Release: May 28, 2009
- Genre(s): Shooter, music

The Polynomial: Space of the Music is a 3D shooter music and indie game by Russian developer Dmytry Lavrov, released on May 28, 2009.
