= Garfield Gets Real (video game) =

2009 video game

- North American cover art
- Developer: Gravity-i
- Publishers: EU: Zoo Digital Publishing; NA: Destination Software Inc.; AU: Funbox Media
- Platform: Nintendo DS
- Release: 2009
- Genre: Action

Garfield Gets Real is an action video game for the Nintendo DS video game console based on the direct-to-DVD CGI movie of the same name starring Garfield the Cat, developed by Gravity-i and published by Zoo Digital in the United Kingdom, and by Destination Software in North America. It was released on Nintendo DS in 2009.

== Gameplay ==
In Garfield Gets Real, players play as Garfield as they play through seven levels of the game that all connect from the cartoon universe to the real world. Each level is a mini-game. In Level 1, 2, 4, and 5 Garfield must collect a certain amount of food (in Level 1 - falling books). In Level 6 Garfield must dance to prove that he is still Garfield. In Level 3 and 7 Garfield must pass through the full-trap areas. In Level 3 he must complete his comic strip way, in Level 7 - rescue Odie.

== Reception ==
On Metacritic this game was given an aggregated score of 39/100, based on 4 critics, indicating generally unfavorable reviews.
