= Planet Pachinko =

2009 video game

- Developer(s): Allied Kingdoms
- Publisher(s): Allied Kingdoms
- Platform(s): Wii
- Release: NA: January 12, 2009
- Genre(s): Shoot 'em up
- Mode(s): Single-player, multiplayer

Planet Pachinko is a shoot 'em up for the Wii by American studio Allied Kingdoms. It was released in North America on January 12, 2009.

== Gameplay ==
The player takes control of the members of a robot family who explore the abandoned temples of the ancient Pachinkeet civilization, their architecture inspired by pachinko machines, destroying pachinko balls along the way to pass each stage. In their way is the space pirate Vile Vill and his crew, who are also exploring the temples and hoping to loot them of their riches.

The game can be played single player or with a friend in two-player co-op.

== Reception ==
IGN called the concept unique and hilarious, but overall felt that many aspects of the game were sloppy, inconsistent and unfinished in execution. They gave it 3/10. WiiWare World noted the original aspects of the game, but felt that the combination of intense, overwhelming action and loose controls took much of the enjoyment out of the game, giving it 5/10.
