= C.O.R.E. (video game) =

2009 video game

- European cover art
- Developer: NoWay Studio
- Publisher: Graffiti Entertainment
- Platform: Nintendo DS
- Release: EU: March 27, 2009; NA: August 11, 2009
- Genres: Shooter; Action
- Modes: Single-player, Multiplayer

C.O.R.E. is a first-person shooter video game by Polish developer NoWay Studio that was released in Europe on March 27, 2009 and in North America on August 11, 2009.

== Story ==
The story begins in the year 2028, when a massive meteor impacts California's Mojave Desert. Over the next two decades, an underground research facility is built to examine the extraterrestrial origins and the bizarre effects that the meteor is having on the natural environment and the people who come in contact with it. The game takes place twenty years after the meteor's arrival on Earth, 2048, when all communications are lost with the C.O.R.E. facility. The Special Technologies Unit, an elite unit of U.S. marines are sent in to investigate and re-establish contact. The player takes control of the marine Jason Crane. Crane fights his way through several levels when most of his fellow soldiers are killed or mutated, including his captain. In the main laboratories, Crane discovers ARG radiation, which is capable of speeding up chemical reactions or slowing them down to an "almost lack of existence." Once Crane reaches the command center, he encounters and kills Colonel R. Nightley. Nightley then sets off a self-destruct protocol and destroys the facility. Crane is able to escape into the service tunnels and makes his way to a cave system. At the end of the caves, he finds the meteor that crashed twenty years earlier. His weapons are absorbed by the meteor and Crane is teleported inside of it. The meteor turns out to be an alien ship. Several of the occupants come out of stasis and restore power to the ship. Crane however manages to destroy the ship's core and escape. After completion of the game an epilogue is viewed that shows that Crane is watching as the alien ship lifts out of the ground. It then shows that there are thousands of other ships emerging all over the world. The game ends on a note that, "and so the war begins," implying a possible sequel.

== Multiplayer ==
The multiplayer game mode allows the players play as an orange, green, blue, or red teams. The game modes are team arena, team death match, capture the flag, and free for all.

== Weapons ==
The game includes 8 different weapons: a pistol, shotgun, assault rifle, plasma rifle, beam rifle, shock rifle, rocket launcher, and an unspecified weapon. The game has jumping, full-scale 360 degree movement/view and alternate fire modes for some of the weapons.

== Reception ==
The game received generally negative reviews upon release and has a Metacritic score of 44/100 based on 16 reviews. Tom Mc Shea, writing for GameSpot, gave the game a 3.5/10 citing poor level design, controls, and combat.
