= Eduardo the Samurai Toaster =

2009 video game

- Developer(s): Semnat Studios
- Publisher(s): Semnat Studios
- Platform(s): Wii (WiiWare)
- Release: NA: June 15, 2009
- Genre(s): Run and gun
- Mode(s): Single-player, multiplayer

Eduardo the Samurai Toaster is a run and gun video game by American developer Semnat Studios for the Wii. It was released through the WiiWare digital distribution service on June 15, 2009 in North America.

== Gameplay ==
The game revolves around players battling a series of enemies (such as spear toting carrots and robotic mangos) across 13 levels, upgrading their weapons along the way by picking up pastry power-ups dropped by them. As well as using a flying toaster mech at certain points in the game. The game also features drop-in cooperative multiplayer for up to four players.

== Development ==
The game features an art style combining drawings covering several mediums such as pen & ink, acrylic paint and charcoal sketchings which were scanned into the game. According to the developers, the game and main character in particular were inspired by a combination of chambara movies and "silly randomness".

== Reception ==
IGN found the art style interesting, but thought the gameplay was shallow, repetitive and generic made marginally more enjoyable with multiple players. It currently holds a score of 61 on Metacritic.
