= Driift Mania =

2009 video game

- Developer: Konami
- Publisher: Konami
- Platform: WiiWare
- Release: PAL: July 31, 2009; NA: September 28, 2009
- Genre: Racing
- Modes: Single-player, multiplayer

Driift Mania (formerly titled Driift) is a WiiWare racing game developed by a French team and released by Konami. It was released in the PAL regions on July 31, 2009. and in North America on September 28, 2009.

== Gameplay ==
Players view the entire track from a bird's-eye view as they race against each other in a variety of vehicles ranging from sports cars and trucks to buses, tanks, and hovercraft. The game features fifteen tracks set across four different environments: urban, rural, desert, and snow. Each environment has different advantages and disadvantages for particular vehicle types.

The game supports up to eight players simultaneously (allowing a combination of Wii Remotes, Nunchuks and Classic Controllers) and features several game modes including single and multiplayer championships as well as team races. Competitive modes include "VIP", in which players must protect a designated player's vehicle, "Contamination" in which a player must try to "infect" others by crashing into them, "Cold Potato" where players scramble for the said vegetable on the track, and "Meteorite", which involves players racing during a deadly meteor shower.

== Development ==
Driift Mania is the first console game developed by Konami's European studio, which had previously only developed games for mobile phone platforms. Initially motion controls were implemented early in the game's development, but were deemed frustrating to use and ultimately removed from the final game, while online multiplayer was not considered because the developers believed that local multiplayer created a much richer experience for players.

== Reception ==
Reception

Aggregate score
Aggregator	Score
Metacritic	71/100

Review scores
Publication	Score
4Players	68%
IGN	8/10
Jeuxvideo.com	13/20
Nintendo Life	7/10

Nintendo Life praised Driift Mania's presentation and multiplayer-orientated gameplay, but wished for a fuller-featured single player mode. Due to its similar presentation and gameplay, Driift Mania has been likened to the arcade games Super Off Road and Super Sprint.
