= Zombie Wranglers =

2009 video game

- Developer(s): Frozen Codebase
- Publisher(s): Activision (Note: Released under the Sierra Online brand name)
- Platform(s): Xbox 360 (Xbox Live Arcade)
- Release: May 6, 2009
- Genre(s): Action
- Mode(s): Single-player, multiplayer

Zombie Wranglers is a downloadable action game, developed by Frozen Codebase and published by Activision for the Xbox Live Arcade. It was released on May 6, 2009.

== Reception ==
Reception

Aggregate score
Aggregator	Score
Metacritic	49/100

Review scores
Publication	Score
GameSpot	3/10
IGN	5/10
Official Xbox Magazine (UK)	6/10
Official Xbox Magazine (US)	6/10
PALGN	3.5/10
TeamXbox	7.5/10
Teletext GameCentral	3/10

Zombie Wranglers received "generally unfavorable reviews" according to the review aggregation website Metacritic.
