= Lucidity (video game) =

2009 video game by LucasArts

- Promotional artwork
- Developer: LucasArts
- Publisher: LucasArts
- Writers: David Nottingham; Joe Ching; Andrea Rhodes
- Engine: XNA
- Platforms: Microsoft Windows, Xbox 360
- Release: October 7, 2009
- Genre: Puzzle-platformer
- Mode: Single-player

Lucidity is a side-scrolling puzzle-platform game developed and published by LucasArts for the Microsoft Windows and Xbox Live Arcade.

== Overview ==
The game involves helping Sofi, a little girl wandering through her dreams in search of her Nana, who has disappeared from her life. Sofi walks innocently across the screen, to the end of each level. Instead of controlling her directly, players control a cursor and use objects such as stairs, trampolines and slingshots to get her across platforms and protect her from enemies. Similar to Tetris, these items come randomly, with an icon in the corner showing which object will come next. Players can "hold" one item for use later on, but they cannot discard items. Within the level there are fireflies that can restore Sofi's health if she is hit by enemies, and which unlock bonus levels if collected in great numbers. If Sofi falls into hazards such as thorns, the player has to restart the level.

== Development ==
The initial prototype for Lucidity was built during an event called "Dream Week" at LucasArts in 2009, where teams of employees had a week to build a game that they wanted to make. The prototype did not win a prize at the end of the event, but it was the only Dream Week game that turned into a published game. A different team built the published game, with one of the original team members, Chip Sbrogna.

The team that built the published game also worked on the 2009 remake of The Secret of Monkey Island. LucasArts said these games were part of an "effort at LucasArts to form several small internal development teams and give them the creative freedom to make games that surprise, amaze and inspire", after several years of mostly making licensed games.

== Reception ==
Reception

Aggregate score
Aggregator	Score	
Aggregator	PC	Xbox 360
Metacritic	59/100	63/100

Review scores
Publication	Score	
Publication	PC	Xbox 360
Destructoid	N/A	4.5/10
Edge	7/10	7/10
Eurogamer	8/10	8/10
Game Informer	N/A	7/10
GamePro	2.5/5	2.5/5
GameSpot	5.5/10	5.5/10
Giant Bomb	N/A	3/5
IGN	N/A	6.3/10
Official Xbox Magazine (US)	N/A	8/10
PC Gamer (UK)	45%	N/A
The A.V. Club	N/A	C+
Teletext GameCentral	N/A	5/10

The game received "mixed" reviews on both platforms according to the review aggregation website Metacritic.

IGN's Daemon Hatfield said that while the art style of the Xbox 360 version is great, the gameplay isn't engaging enough. Giant Bomb's Vinny Caravella said that while the art design of the same console version is "absolutely exquisite", the gameplay is average, and the random order of the items can get frustrating. Caravella also said that the framing story, of Sofi dealing with the loss of her Nana, tried too hard to be cute and heartwarming, at times being "a little too 'fuzzy mittens' for its own good". Carolyn Petit, a reviewer for GameSpot, stated that the "Difficulty [of the game] can be maddening sometimes." She also noted the inability of the camera to zoom out made navigation difficult. She praised the game's interesting concept, but claimed that "Unfortunately, the gameplay rarely contributes much enjoyment to this experience and often operates at direct odds with it."

The Australian video game talk show Good Game's two reviewers gave the Xbox 360 version 5.5 out of 10 and 6.5 out of 10.
