= 2009 in esports =

This topic lists the Esports events for the 2009 year.

Date	Game	Event	Location	Winner/s
January 18	Counter-Strike; WarCraft III	IEM Season III - Asian Finals - CS1.6		
February 8	StarCraft: Brood War	Averatec-Intel Classic #2		Kim "Bisu" Taek-yong
March 5	Counter-Strike World of Warcraft	ESL Intel Extreme Masters (EM) III - European Finals		
March 8	Counter-Strike; World of Warcraft	IEM Season III - Global Finals		Fnatic; H O N
March 21	StarCraft: Brood War	Lost Saga MSL 2009		Park "Luxury" Chan-soo
April 4	StarCraft: Brood War	Batoo OSL 2009		Lee Jae-dong
April 5	Gears of War 2 Halo 3	MLG Meadowlands 2009		
May 6	Counter-Strike; StarCraft: Brood War; WarCraft III	ESWC 2009 Masters of Cheonan	Cheonan, South Korea	
June 7	Gears of War 2 Halo 3 World of Warcraft	MLG Columbus 2009		
June 14	Various games	EPS Germany Season 14 Finals		
June 28	Warcraft III; World of Warcraft	BlizzCon 2009 NA/EU Regional Finals		
July 17–19	Fighting games	Evolution 2009	Rio All Suite Hotel and Casino; Las Vegas, Nevada, US	
July 26	Counter-Strike; StarCraft: Brood War; WarCraft III	WEG e-Stars 2009		
August 16	StarCraft: Brood War	Averatec-Intel Classic #3		Lee "Flash" Young-ho
August 22	WarCraft III; StarCraft: Brood War; WarCraft III	BlizzCon 2009		
August 22	StarCraft: Brood War	Bacchus OSL 2009		Lee Jae-dong
August 30	Gears of War 2 Halo 3 World of Warcraft	MLG Dallas 2009		
August 30	StarCraft: Brood War	Avalon MSL 2009		
October 3	Counter-Strike; Defense of the Ancients; WarCraft III	IEM Season IV - Chengdu	Chengdu, Sichuan, China	
October 27	League of Legends released			
November 1	Counter-Strike; WarCraft III; StarCraft: Brood War	International e-Sports Festival 2009		
November 8	Various games	MLG Anaheim 2009	Anaheim, California	
November 15	Various games	World Cyber Games 2009	Chengdu, Sichuan, China	
November 27	Various games	DreamHack Winter 2009		
December 13	Counter-Strike; Quake Live; World of Warcraft	IEM Season IV - American Championship Finals		
December 19	Counter-Strike; Warcraft III	World e-Sports Masters 2009		
