= Sandy Beach (video game) =

2009 video game

- Developer: Frozen Codebase
- Publisher: Konami
- Platform: Wii (WiiWare)
- Release: NA: January 5, 2009; JP: August 4, 2009; PAL: August 6, 2010
- Genre: Action
- Modes: Single-player, multiplayer

Sandy Beach is a video game developed by Frozen Codebase and published by Konami for the Wii's WiiWare digital distribution service. It has been released in North America, Japan and the PAL region.

== Gameplay ==
Gameplay of Sandy Beach

Sandy Beach contains two distinct game modes: a freeform sandbox mode where the player (and a friend with a second controller) is able to build a sandcastle on a beach without distraction, and a tower defense-inspired "Crab Battle" mode where a single player must defend a sandcastle from waves of attacking crabs, repairing it after each attack. The Crab Battle mode sees players using the motion controls of the Wii Remote to slap them away, while they can also place defensive walls and cannons around the castle to create further obstacles.

== Reception ==
WiiWare World thought that Sandy Beach "looks and plays like a hastily thrown together game" and gave it a 4/10, feeling that while both modes offered something for all players, ultimately they were both unsatisfying – being too simple, lacking in replay value and suffering from "unforgivably clumsy controls". 1UP.com called it "little more than a tossed-off curiosity", citing shallow gameplay and imprecise controls, giving the game a D grade.

IGN gave it 5/10, finding the concept interesting, especially for younger players, but thought the game looked and played like a "rudimentary 3D Flash game". Official Nintendo Magazine called the game "fun for an hour or so", and GamesMaster called it: "Every bit as dull as it sounds, and with sloppy controls to boot." Joystiq gave the game a 2/10, calling it "irritating" and "baffling".
