= Crystal Defenders =

Two tower defense video games by Square Enix

- Genre: Tower defense
- Developer: Square Enix (Note: Additional development by Mobile Software Foundation and Winds)
- Publisher: Square Enix
- Artist: Ryoma Itō
- Composer: Hitoshi Sakimoto
- Platforms: Mobile phone, iOS, Android, iPod, Xbox 360, PlayStation 3, Wii, PlayStation Portable
- First release: Crystal Guardians; January 28, 2008
- Latest release: Crystal Defenders: Vanguard Storm; May 13, 2009

Crystal Defenders is a set of two tower defense video games developed and published by Square Enix. The games use the setting of Ivalice and design elements from Final Fantasy Tactics A2: Grimoire of the Rift, forming part of the wider Final Fantasy franchise. The games feature a selection of characters sporting Final Fantasy-based character classes, and play out tower defense scenarios against recurring series of monsters. The first game in the series is Crystal Guardians, (Note: Kurisutaru Gādianzu (クリスタル ガーディアンズ)) which was released in three parts for Japanese mobile phones in 2008. It was adapted for iOS later that year as Square Enix's first game for the platform, and renamed Crystal Defenders. (Note: Kurisutaru Difendāzu (クリスタル・ディフェンダーズ)) Under that name, the game was also released between 2009 and 2011 for Android, Xbox Live Arcade, WiiWare, and PlayStation 3 and PlayStation Portable via the PlayStation Store. It was re-released with graphical improvements for iOS as Crystal Defenders Plus (Note: Kurisutaru Difendāzu Purasu (クリスタル・ディフェンダー ズ Plus)) in 2013. A sequel, Crystal Defenders: Vanguard Storm, (Note: Kurisutaru Difendāzu: Bangādo Sutōmu (クリスタル・ディフェンダーズ ヴァンガード・ストーム)) was released for iOS in 2009.

The two games have similar base gameplay mechanics, wherein the player places troops of different classes to defend their crystals against multiple waves of enemies advancing across the screen. Defenders has the player place troops alongside a winding path that enemies march along, with the troops attacking the enemy monsters continuously without retaliation. Vanguard Storm, in contrast, has the player place troops on the right half of a grid that enemies move across in one square per turn, with the player adjusting the placement of their forces every turn. Crystal Defenders was Square Enix's first game for smartphones, while Vanguard Storm was its first game to be designed especially for touchscreen controls. The games use character designs and music created for Tactics A2 by artist Ryoma Itō and composer Hitoshi Sakimoto, and the series was produced by Takehiro Ando. Square Enix was assisted in development of Guardians and Defenders by external studios Mobile Software Foundation and Winds. Defenders was met with generally poor reviews, despite achieving one million downloads worldwide by 2012, with critics finding the game to be uninspired and unpolished. Vanguard Storm received more praise from critics, who appreciated the graphics and found the gameplay fun, though not without flaws.

== Gameplay ==
A screenshot of the mobile phone version of Crystal Guardians. A line of enemies is moving down the path in Wave 8 of a stage, with several troops placed to attack them.

All of the releases in the Crystal Defenders series are tower defense games composed of multiple stages, each consisting of a top-down view of a winding path. Stages contain 31 waves (or levels) of enemies that enter the area on the left side of the screen and walk along the pathway towards the goal, a set of crystals off the right side of the screen. The goal of the game is to protect the crystals from enemies by strategically placing troops of various "jobs", or classes, alongside the pathway to defeat the enemies and prevent them from reaching the other side of the map. Troops can attack within a circular area around them, moving to do so if required such as for sword-using fighters. Different classes attack in different ways, with some classes having effects such as causing damage over time or slowing enemies. Each enemy that reaches the crystals takes one; the game ends if twenty enemies reach the crystals during a stage. Players can also summon Espers at the cost of some crystals to either cause damage or have effects on all enemies on screen.

The first game, originally named Crystal Guardians and later renamed Crystal Defenders, was released in three separate chapters named W1, W2, and W3. The W1 chapter lets the player use the Soldier, Time Mage, Archer, Thieves, Black Mage, and White Monk jobs. W2 introduces the Berserker and Dragoon jobs and adds a "crystal power" element to increase the power and speed of the player's characters. W3 introduces the Fencer, Flintlock, and Tinker jobs, while removing the Soldier and Archer jobs. The Wii version of Crystal Defenders is divided into R1 and R2 chapters and offers a new ranking system via Nintendo Wi-Fi Connection. The R1 chapter offers the same jobs as W1 with the addition of the dragoon job from W2. R2 contains the same jobs as in W3 and offers the crystals feature previously introduced in W2.

In Crystal Defenders: Vanguard Storm the maps no longer have winding pathways, but instead are four rows of eight squares. The player can place troops on the squares on the right half of the map, defending against enemies entering from the left side of the screen. Each stage is now turn-based instead of real-time, with enemies advancing a single square to the right each turn, harming troops they run into and ending the game if any enemies reach the right side of the screen. At the beginning of each stage the player selects which troops to use, and between turns the player has a limited amount of time to rearrange their forces, who then attack available enemies at the beginning of the turn. After specific waves, the player receives "Reinforcement", where they may choose one of two units to add to their army. At the end of each wave, all troops on the board level up, gaining health points and attack power. Thus, at any point all troops' levels are equal to the wave number. Enemies are divided into three types: standard and physically resistant ground-based enemies, and flying enemies. Different classes are effective against different types; Black Mages, for example, can harm physically resistant enemies, while archers can reach flying monsters. Different classes also attack in different patterns, with some reaching multiple spaces in front of them in a group or line, while others have special abilities such as the Paladin blocking enemies or the White Mage restoring health of other troops. Levels start with a limited selection of classes available, and every few waves the player gets to choose one from a set of additional classes to add to their options.

== Development ==
Crystal Defenders: Vanguard Storm gameplay screenshot, showing six enemies moving across the screen towards five defenders.

Three developers have worked on the Crystal Defenders series; the series as a whole was supervised by Final Fantasy franchise owner Square Enix. External studios Mobile Software Foundation and Winds worked with Square Enix on Crystal Guardians and Crystal Defenders, while Square Enix worked alone on Crystal Defenders: Vanguard Storm. The Crystal Defenders series uses the recurring setting of Ivalice, specifically recycling character designs and aesthetic elements from the Nintendo DS title Final Fantasy Tactics A2: Grimoire of the Rift. Despite having a different genre from previous Tactics titles, the team aimed to keep the game as faithful as possible to the world and aesthetic of Ivalice. The series reuses music from Tactics A2 composed by Hitoshi Sakimoto and other composers from Sakimoto's studio Basiscape. The character designs were created by Ryoma Itō, who had previously worked on Final Fantasy Tactics Advance, Tactics A2 and Final Fantasy XII: Revenant Wings. The series was produced by Takehiro Ando of Square Enix's mobile division. Crystal Defenders was Square Enix's first game for smartphones. Vanguard Storm was the first Square Enix game to be designed especially for touchscreen controls.

=== Release ===
Crystal Guardians was released in three separate chapters for mobile phones in Japan in 2008. It was released on January 28, March 10, and May 5 for i-mode, April 1, June 2, and July 16 for Yahoo! Keitai, and June 19, September 4, and October 23 for EZWeb phones. The game was released worldwide on December 23 the same year as Crystal Defenders for iOS devices and iPods, with all three chapters releasing simultaneously. This version was ported to Xbox Live Arcade worldwide for the Xbox 360 and via the PlayStation Store for PlayStation 3 in Japan on March 11, 2009. The PlayStation 3 version was released outside of Japan on August 6. It was released for WiiWare as two chapters, R1 and R2; R1 was released in Japan on January 27, 2009, and elsewhere on April 20. R2 was released in Japan on February 24, 2009, and elsewhere on May 18. The game was also ported via the PlayStation Store for PlayStation Portable on October 29, 2009, and optimized for the iPad on July 1, 2010. The game was released on Android on January 25, 2011, though only the W1 and W2 chapters were released.

The game was re-released for iOS with higher quality graphics as Crystal Defenders Plus on February 20, 2013; W1 was made free with the other chapters available as in-app purchases. Distribution of Crystal Defenders Plus and Crystal Defenders's iOS version ended in May 2016. Crystal Defenders: Vanguard Storm was released worldwide for iOS on May 13, 2009. Distribution of Vanguard Storm ended in August 2017.

== Reception ==
Aggregate review scores
| Game | GameRankings | Metacritic |
|---|---|---|
| Crystal Defenders | X360: 58% Wii: 63% PS3: 54% | X360: 52/100; Wii: 62/100; PS3: 63/100 |
| Vanguard Storm | – | – |

The series, especially Crystal Defenders, has sold well, with Defenders achieving one million downloads worldwide as of December 2012. Overall critical response to the series has been mixed, however, with Defenders receiving poor reviews and Vanguard Storm earning a more mixed reception. Reaction to the presentation of the mobile versions of Crystal Defenders and its ports were mixed; Connor Egan of Slide to Play noted that it "faithfully reproduces the look of the Final Fantasy Tactics series", but found that the control scheme made the gameplay area feel small and cramped. Sam Bishop of IGN criticized the visuals of the PlayStation 3 port of the game for being "minimally animated" phone graphics with a border around them, though he praised the music. IGN's Ryan Geddes, in reviewing the Xbox 360 version, was much harsher: he dismissed the character designs as "generic looking" and the animation quality as "dull", though he had no complaints about the music or sound effects. Tom McShea of GameSpot had similar complaints about the Xbox 360 version, calling the character graphics "devoid of personality" with minimal animation. The gameplay received similar reviews: McShea criticized the game's artificial intelligence and termed the gameplay "lifeless and uninspired", and Geddes concluded that the "gameplay is stale and the concept is poorly executed". Both Egan and Bishop were more positive to the game, feeling that it was a competent example of a tower defense game, but Egan felt that the "ungainly and amateurish controls damage the experience", and both reviewers found the game to be very difficult to complete.

Crystal Defenders: Vanguard Storm received more favorable reviews than the original game. The presentation was praised, with Levi Buchannan of IGN terming the graphics as "colorful and nicely drawn" and Torbjorn Kamblad of TouchGen calling it "colourful, bright and cute". Kamblad and the Slide to Play review both also commended the music as a highlight. Reactions were more mixed to the gameplay, however: Buchannan praised the "fun" gameplay and deemed it superior to the original game, Tracy Erikson of Pocket Gamer praised the "solid gameplay and fine balancing", and Nick Gillett of The Guardian called it "simple, clever and compelling" with a higher level of polish and quality than other mobile tower defense games. The Touch Arcade review, in contrast, felt instead that it was a solid casual game with flaws, while Kamblad derided it as "a strategy game where strategy isn't important" and the Slide to Play review said that it had a solid base that the game failed to make the most of, with too many holes in the gameplay to recommend to players who were not Final Fantasy fans.
