= Neighborhood Games =

2009 video game

- Developer: Jet Black Games
- Publisher: THQ
- Platform: Wii
- Release: January 12, 2009
- Genre: Party
- Modes: Single-player, multiplayer

Neighborhood Games, known in PAL regions as Big Family Games, is a party video game developed by Canadian studio Jet Black Games and published by THQ. It was released for the Wii in North America on January 12, 2009.

== Gameplay ==
Screenshot of Neighborhood Games

Neighborhood Games offers players 24 versions of neighborhood games, including football, basketball, baseball, golf, tennis, lawn darts, horseshoes, and bocce. Games can be played just for fun or competitively in a tournament mode, in which players battle "backyard bosses" to conquer the neighborhood. Players can also create their own customizable and playable characters. In multiplayer games, when it is not a player's turn, they can "taunt [...] opponents from the sidelines to break their concentration".

== Development ==
THQ first announced the game on September 29, 2008.

== Marketing ==
In May 2009, as part of a marketing stunt, THQ attempted to send a gold-plated Wii console and a copy of the game to the Queen of the United Kingdom. Ten years later, in January 2019, a reporter found that the Queen had rejected the console and game, and instead found its way in the hands of a Dutch collector. The collector auctioned off the console in April 2021 at an asking price of $300,000.

== Reception ==
Reception

Aggregate score
Aggregator	Score
Metacritic	49%

Review scores
Publication	Score
GameZone	6.0 of 10
IGN	4.0 of 10

The game was given "generally negative reviews", receiving an aggregated score of 49% from Metacritic.

Anise Hollingshead of GameZone gave the game an overall score of 6.0 out of 10. She enjoyed each minigame's design, but found that the "unpredictable" controls made many of them frustrating to play. The visuals were appreciated by Hollingshead, who noted that they would appeal to kids because of their inviting atmospheres. She found the game's overall presentation adequate, remarking that its concept is not new to the Wii. Concluding the review, Hollingshead called the game a good idea, and wrote that its flaws are "a shame, because there are lots of varied and attractive games included in this compilation. Best for families with older children that don't frustrate easily."

IGN was particularly disappointed with the game's music, which it said "has to go". They criticized the game as having poor controls, and called the character designs "truly bad". They were also unhappy with the game designs, describe all of them as a "lob the Wii Remote" design.
