= Food Network: Cook or Be Cooked =

2009 video game

- Cover art
- Developer(s): Red Fly Studio
- Publisher(s): Namco Bandai Games
- Engine: Infernal
- Platform(s): Wii
- Release: NA: November 3, 2009
- Genre(s): Simulation, minigame
- Mode(s): Single player, multiplayer

Food Network: Cook or Be Cooked is a cooking simulation-styled minigame compilation developed by American studio Red Fly Studio and published by Namco Bandai Games. It was released exclusively in North America on November 3, 2009, and is the first video game to use the Food Network license.

Cook or Be Cooked contains twelve different meals to prepare; the player must go through recipes and complete the meals by completing minigames correctly. The game features a single player mode, a hotseat mode allowing up to four players to prepare one meal, and a multiplayer cook-off mode between two people. Cook or Be Cooked garnered mediocre reviews from critics upon release, who noted a lack of content in the game.

== Gameplay ==
The player must cook multiple recipes at the same time to complete a meal.

The game places the player in a 3-D kitchen environment and tasks them with cooking meals to be judged upon completion. The kitchen features multiple working areas, each with a dedicated camera angle.

From a first-person perspective, players utilize the motion controls of the Wii Remote and Nunchuk to cook and prepare food. Meals consist of multiple dishes which must be served at the same time so that they remain hot enough to be enjoyable; the game requires the player to manage their time while cooking. There is also an ability to speed up the flow of time to skip the tedious waiting periods between recipe steps, but it must be used cautiously to avoid missing timing cues for certain next steps.

There are twelve recipes, half of them being American and half of them being international, split among the three daily meal times (breakfast, lunch and dinner), ranging from a cheeseburger with a side of potato salad to a homemade marinara pasta dish, and the game's instruction manual contains an appendix that provides real-life instructions on how to cook each of them, based on the recipe book Food Network: How to Boil Water. The game responds to the player's performance during and after the recipe, with Food Network's Mory Thomas and Susie Fogelson (appearing in the game in shrunken form after warping through a television screen) providing in-game commentary about real-life cooking tips and the player's performance, as well as judging and assessing the recipe's final score with a taste test.

== History ==
The game was first publicized by a press release on April 29, 2009, in which the game's title and the partnership between Namco Bandai and the Food Network was announced. The game was released on November 3, 2009.

== Reception ==
Reception

Aggregate score
Aggregator	Score
Metacritic	53/100

Review scores
Publication	Score
1Up.com	D
The A.V. Club	C
GameRevolution	D+
GameSpot	6.5/10
GameZone	7/10
Nintendo World Report	7/10

Cook or Be Cooked received "mixed" reviews according to the review aggregation website Metacritic. GameSpot's Shaun McInnis noted that though the gameplay itself controlled tightly and was fun, it held little replay value because of the lack of dishes to create. David Wolinsky of The A.V. Club described the game as immersive when it worked, but felt the game's small selection of recipes made the fun short-lived. 1Up.com's Mike Cruz stated that the game could be finished in one sitting.
