= Finger Physics =

2009 video game

- Developer: PressOK Entertainment
- Platforms: iOS, Android
- Release: September 27, 2009
- Mode: Single-player

Finger Physics is a physics-based puzzle mobile-only game published by American studio PressOK Entertainment on September 27, 2009. A sequel entitled Finger Physics: Thumb Wars was released the following year on July 22, 2010.

== Critical reception ==
=== Finger Physics ===
CommonSenseMedia gave it 5/5 stars, writing "Finger Physics is an incredibly well made game app. Whether you're holding your breath, carefully stacking different shaped blocks, or knocking obstacles out of the way to guide a big block down to the screen's bottom, you're both exercising your knowledge of the laws of physics and having a heck of a lot of fun at the same time. New puzzles and levels are available to download in the future, giving Finger Physics the chance to be a very long-lived app on your iPhone." AppSpy gave it 4.5, concluding "You know a game is great when it offers the same four or five game modes but doesn't feel repetitive in the slightest. Finger Physics is one of those games."

AppAdvice wrote "Finger physics is a well done game, and if it wasn't for Topple 2 it would be a should buy, and the ratings indicate that. For $0.99 Finger Physics is worth considering depending on whether you have Topple 2 or not. Also if you don't have Topple 2, it's free so get downloading." SlideToPlay gave it 3 out of 4, commenting "We weren't knocked out by its charm, but Finger Physics doesn't skimp on the puzzles."

148Apps gave it 4.5 starts, writing "Finger Physics does its best to pull you in and keep you going by offering a variety of game modes, some of which have a pretty unique slant, and it does so at a very modest price. Anyone who is a fan of the physics puzzle genre will get a good amount of challenge and enjoyment out of the game, and may just find that the urge to get a gold star on every level can be quite irresistible. Pocket Gamer rated it 8/10, concluding "Though lacking an energetic personality, new elements make this physics gaming compound fresh and fun to play".

=== Finger Physics: Thumb Wars ===
The game has a Metacritic rating of 69% based on 5 critic reviews.

AppSpy wrote "Finger Physics: Thumb Wars picks up the pieces where Finger Fun left off and manages to improve on an already solid physics puzzler". Slide To Play said "This sequel-of-sorts to the popular compilation of physics games offers less variety, but an awesome leaderboard concept that makes it worth playing." 148Apps wrote "Finger Physics: Thumb Wars does a good job at differentiating itself and adding the novel country competition mechanic, but the monotonous gameplay and frustrating menu layouts drag the game down." Pocket Gamer UK said "A novel combination of physics gameplay and creative online scoring, Finger Physics: Thumb Wars could stand for more polished level design." No DPad wrote "I liked the first one and was looking for some improvement in terms of replay value, but I didn't exactly get it."
