= 2008 in video games =

2008 saw many new installments in established video game franchises, such as Grand Theft Auto IV, Fallout 3, Metal Gear Solid 4: Guns of the Patriots, Gears of War 2, Super Smash Bros. Brawl, Persona 4, Fable II, Call of Duty: World at War, Mario Kart Wii, Madden NFL 09, NBA Live 09, NBA 2K9, Sonic Unleashed, Trauma Center: Under the Knife 2, and WWE Smackdown vs. Raw 2009. New intellectual properties included Army of Two, Dead Space, Left 4 Dead, LittleBigPlanet, Mirror's Edge, iRacing, Race Driver: Grid, and Spore, De Blob, Meat Boy.

== Legend ==
Video game platforms
DS	Nintendo DS, DSiWare, iQue DS	iOS	iOS, iPhone, iPod, iPadOS, iPad, visionOS, Apple Vision Pro	LIN	Linux, SteamOS
MOBI	Mobile phone	OSX	macOS	PS2	PlayStation 2
PS3	PlayStation 3	PSN	PlayStation Network	PSP	PlayStation Portable
WEB	Browser game	Wii	Wii, WiiWare, Wii Virtual Console	WIN	Windows, all versions Windows 95 and up
XB360	Xbox 360, Xbox 360 Live Arcade	XB	Xbox, Xbox Live Arcade		

== Financial performance ==
=== Best-selling hardware by region ===
Canada

- Based on figures from the NPD Group (first seven months of 2008 only)

Place	Console	Units sold
1	Wii	376,000
2	PS3	200,000
3	XB360	154,000

Japan

- Based on figures from Enterbrain (December 31, 2007 – December 28, 2008)

Place	Console	Units sold
1	DS	4,029,804
2	PSP	3,543,171
3	Wii	2,908,342
4	PS3	991,303
5	PS2	480,664
6	XB360	317,859
7	Other	9,575

United States

- Based on figures from the NPD Group (first six months of 2008)

Place	Console	Units sold
1	Wii	3.5 million
2	PS3	1.6 million
3	XB360	1.34 million

=== Best-selling games by region ===
Worldwide

Best-selling video games of 2008 worldwide (at least 5 million units)
Rank	Title	Sales	Publisher	Platform(s)	Ref.
1	Wii Sports	22,660,000	Nintendo	Wii	(Note: Wii Sports sales in 2008: January–March – 3.71 million; April–December – 18.95 million)
2	Mario Kart Wii	13,670,000	Nintendo	Wii	
3	Wii Fit	12,960,000	Nintendo	Wii	(Note: Wii Fit sales in 2008: January–March – 800,000; April–December – 12.16 million)
4	Wii Play	11,680,000	Nintendo	Wii	(Note: Wii Play sales in 2008: January–March – 2.28 million; April–December – 9.4 million)
5	Grand Theft Auto IV	10,000,000	Take-Two Interactive	PS3, XB360	
6	Super Smash Bros. Brawl	8,100,000	Nintendo	Wii	
7	Call of Duty: World at War	5,890,000	Activision Blizzard	PS3, XB360, WIN	
8	Brain Age: Train Your Brain in Minutes a Day!	5,110,000	Nintendo	DS	(Note: Brain Age sales in 2008: January–March – 1.27 million; April–December – 3.84 million)

Japan

- Based on figures from Enterbrain:

Best-selling video games of 2008 in Japan (December 31, 2007 – December 28, 2008)
Place	Title	Platform	Publisher	Units sold
1	Monster Hunter Portable 2nd G	PSP	Capcom	2,452,111
2	Pokémon Platinum	DS	Pokémon Company	2,187,337
3	Wii Fit	Wii	Nintendo	2,149,131
4	Mario Kart Wii	Wii	Nintendo	2,003,315
5	Super Smash Bros. Brawl	Wii	Nintendo	1,747,113
6	Rhythm Heaven	DS	Nintendo	1,350,671
7	Dragon Quest V: Hand of the Heavenly Bride	DS	Square Enix	1,176,082
8	Animal Crossing: City Folk	Wii	Nintendo	895,302
9	Kirby Super Star Ultra	DS	Nintendo	855,427
10	Wii Sports	Wii	Nintendo	841,736

- Based on figures from Dengeki:

Best-selling video games of 2008 in Japan (December 31, 2007 – December 21, 2008)

Place	Title	Platform	Publisher	Units sold
1	Monster Hunter Portable 2nd G	PSP	Capcom	2,507,400
2	Pokémon Platinum	DS	Pokémon Company	2,125,348
3	Wii Fit	Wii	Nintendo	2,024,113
4	Mario Kart Wii	Wii	Nintendo	1,973,089
5	Super Smash Bros. Brawl	Wii	Nintendo	1,808,709
6	Rhythm Heaven	DS	Nintendo	1,320,047
7	Dragon Quest V: Hand of the Heavenly Bride	DS	Square Enix	1,228,014
8	Kirby Super Star Ultra	DS	Nintendo	724,608
9	Animal Crossing: City Folk	Wii	Nintendo	709,640
10	Wii Sports	Wii	Nintendo	694,765

United States

- Based on figures from the NPD Group

Best-selling video games of 2008 in the US
Place	Title	Platform	Publisher	Units sold
1	Wii Play	Wii	Nintendo	5.28 million
2	Mario Kart Wii	Wii	Nintendo	5.00 million
3	Wii Fit	Wii	Nintendo	4.53 million
4	Super Smash Bros. Brawl	Wii	Nintendo	4.17 million
5	Grand Theft Auto IV	XB360	Rockstar Games	3.29 million
6	Call of Duty: World at War	XB360	Activision	2.75 million
7	Gears of War 2	XB360	Microsoft	2.31 million
8	Grand Theft Auto IV	PS3	Rockstar Games	1.89 million
9	Madden NFL 09	XB360	Electronic Arts	1.87 million
10	Mario Kart DS	DS	Nintendo	1.65 million

Other

- Based on figures from Enterbrain, GfK Chart-Track, and the NPD Group, respectively:

Best-selling video games in Japan, United Kingdom, and the United States combined (January–July 2008)

Place	Title	Units sold in Japan	Units sold in the UK	Units sold in the US	Total units sold
1	Grand Theft Auto IV	–	1,582,000	4,711,000	6,293,000
2	Super Smash Bros. Brawl	1,681,000	213,000	3,539,000	5,433,000
3	Mario Kart Wii	1,601,000	687,000	2,409,000	4,697,000
4	Wii Fit	1,547,000	624,000	1,433,000	3,604,000
5	Guitar Hero III: Legends of Rock	26,000	412,000	3,037,000	3,475,000

Best-selling video games in Japan, United Kingdom, and the United States combined (July–September 2008)

Place	Title	Units sold in Japan	Units sold in the UK	Units sold in the US	Total units sold
1	Madden NFL 09	1,000	35,000	2,958,000	2,994,000
2	Wii Fit	346,000	460,000	1,283,000	2,089,000
3	Star Wars: The Force Unleashed	–	321,000	1,417,000	1,738,000
4	Pokémon Platinum	1,482,000	–	–	1,482,000
5	Mario Kart Wii	218,000	394,000	856,000	1,468,000

=== Best-selling games per platform by region ===
United States

- Based on figures from the NPD Group via IGN; the games' publishers are listed in brackets:

Best-selling video games of 2008 in the US (by platform) (Note: In the IGN articles used as sources, IGN lists the titles as the "Top 10 Sellers in 2008"; however, the IGN articles were published on December 9–12, 2008, so the articles might not take into account November and December sales figures, as the NPD Group did not release November's console game sales figures until December 11, 2008.)
Place	DS	PC	PS3	PSP	Wii	XB360
1	Mario & Sonic at the Olympic Games (Sega)	Spore (Electronic Arts)	Grand Theft Auto IV (Rockstar Games)	Crisis Core: Final Fantasy VII (Square Enix)	Super Smash Bros. Brawl (Nintendo)	Grand Theft Auto IV (Rockstar Games)
2	Pokémon Mystery Dungeon: Explorers of Time and Explorers of Darkness (Nintendo)	Age of Conan: Hyborian Adventures (Funcom)	Metal Gear Solid 4: Guns of the Patriots (Konami)	God of War: Chains of Olympus (Sony Computer Entertainment)	Mario Kart Wii (Nintendo)	Madden NFL 09 (Electronic Arts)
3	Guitar Hero: On Tour (Activision)	Warhammer Online: Age of Reckoning (Electronic Arts)	Madden NFL 09 (Electronic Arts)	MLB 08: The Show (Sony Computer Entertainment)	Wii Fit (Nintendo)	Fable II (Microsoft)
4	Lego Indiana Jones: The Original Adventures (LucasArts)	The Sims 2: FreeTime (Electronic Arts)	Gran Turismo 5 Prologue (Sony Computer Entertainment)	Iron Man (Sega)	Rock Band (MTV Games)	Tom Clancy's Rainbow Six: Vegas 2 (Ubisoft)
5	Kirby Super Star Ultra (Nintendo)	Spore Creature Creator (Electronic Arts)	MLB 08: The Show (Sony Computer Entertainment)	Patapon (Sony Computer Entertainment)	Lego Indiana Jones: The Original Adventures (LucasArts)	Army of Two (Electronic Arts)
6	Professor Layton and the Curious Village (Nintendo)	Sins of a Solar Empire (Stardock)	Star Wars: The Force Unleashed (LucasArts)	Madden NFL 09 (Electronic Arts)	Mario Super Sluggers (Nintendo)	Star Wars: The Force Unleashed (LucasArts)
7	Kung Fu Panda (Activision)	The Sims 2: Apartment Life (Electronic Arts)	NCAA Football 09 (Electronic Arts)	Lego Indiana Jones (LucasArts)	Star Wars: The Force Unleashed (LucasArts)	Battlefield: Bad Company (Electronic Arts)
8	Advance Wars: Days of Ruin (Nintendo)	The Sims 2: Kitchen & Bath Interior Design Stuff (Electronic Arts)	Army of Two (Electronic Arts)	Major League Baseball 2K8 (2K Games)	Deca Sports (Hudson Soft)	NCAA Football 09 (Electronic Arts)
9	Crosswords DS (Nintendo)	Warhammer 40,000: Dawn of War: Soulstorm (THQ)	Soulcalibur IV (Namco Bandai)	Star Wars: The Force Unleashed (LucasArts)	Endless Ocean (Nintendo)	Rock Band 2 (MTV Games)
10	Final Fantasy Tactics A2: Grimoire of the Rift (Square Enix)	The Sims Castaway Stories (Electronic Arts)	Devil May Cry 4 (Capcom)	Need for Speed: ProStreet (Electronic Arts)	Unknown	Ninja Gaiden II (Microsoft)

=== All time video game sales ===
United States

- Based on figures from the NPD Group (Note: This list only includes games that were released after NPD started tracking video game sales data.)

Best-selling console games of all time in the US (as of May 1, 2008)
Place	Title	Units sold
1	Grand Theft Auto: San Andreas	9.40 million
2	Guitar Hero III: Legends of Rock	8.20 million
3	Madden NFL 07	7.70 million
4	Grand Theft Auto: Vice City	7.30 million
5	Madden NFL 06	6.70 million
6	Halo 2	6.61 million
7	Madden NFL 08	6.60 million
8	Call of Duty 4: Modern Warfare	6.25 million
9	Grand Theft Auto III	6.20 million
10	Madden NFL 2005	6.10 million

== Top-rated games ==
=== Critically acclaimed games ===
Metacritic (MC) and GameRankings (GR) are aggregators of video game journalism reviews.

2008 games and expansions scoring at least 88/100 (MC) or 87.5% (GR)
Game	Publisher	Release Date	Platform	MC score	GR score
Grand Theft Auto IV	Rockstar Games	April 29, 2008	PS3	98/100	97.04%
Grand Theft Auto IV	Rockstar Games	April 29, 2008	XB360	98/100	96.67%
LittleBigPlanet	Sony Computer Entertainment	October 27, 2008	PS3	95/100	94.75%
World of Goo	2D Boy	October 13, 2008	Wii	94/100	94.04%
BioShock	2K Games	October 17, 2008	PS3	94/100	93.66%
Metal Gear Solid 4: Guns of the Patriots	Konami	June 12, 2008	PS3	94/100	93.53%
Gears of War 2	Microsoft Game Studios	November 7, 2008	XB360	93/100	93.32%
Fallout 3	Bethesda Softworks	October 28, 2008	XB360	93/100	92.85%
Super Smash Bros. Brawl	Nintendo	January 31, 2008	Wii	93/100	92.84%
Braid	Number None	August 6, 2008	XB360	93/100	92.15%
Flipnote Studio	Nintendo	December 24, 2008	DS	93/100	91%
World of Warcraft: Wrath of the Lich King	Blizzard Entertainment	November 13, 2008	WIN	91/100	92.68%
Galactic Civilizations II: Twilight of the Arnor	Stardock	April 30, 2008	WIN	92/100	92.33%
Persona 4	Atlus	July 10, 2008	PS2	90/100	92.28%
World of Goo	2D Boy	October 13, 2008	WIN	90/100	92.27%
Rock Band 2	MTV Games	September 14, 2008	XB360	92/100	92.25%
Chrono Trigger	Square Enix	November 20, 2008	DS	92/100	91.98%
Rock Band 2	MTV Games	September 14, 2008	Wii	92/100	91.33%
Rock Band 2	MTV Games	September 14, 2008	PS3	91/100	91.5%
God of War: Chains of Olympus	Sony Computer Entertainment	March 4, 2008	PSP	91/100	91.44%
Fallout 3	Bethesda Softworks	October 28, 2008	WIN	91/100	90.85%
Fallout 3	Bethesda Softworks	October 28, 2008	PS3	90/100	90.52%
Ōkami	Capcom	April 15, 2008	Wii	90/100	90.02%
Geometry Wars: Retro Evolved 2	Microsoft Game Studios	July 30, 2008	XB360	90/100	89.77%
Portal: Still Alive	Valve	October 22, 2008	XB360	90/100	88.55%
Grand Theft Auto IV	Rockstar Games	December 2, 2008	WIN	90/100	88.48%
Mass Effect	Electronic Arts	May 28, 2008	WIN	89/100	89.7%
Left 4 Dead	Valve	November 18, 2008	XB360	89/100	89.44%
Left 4 Dead	Valve	November 18, 2008	WIN	89/100	89.43%
Dead Space	Electronic Arts	October 13, 2008	XB360	89/100	89.07%
Dead Space	Electronic Arts	October 13, 2008	PS3	88/100	89.05%
Rez HD	Microsoft Game Studios	January 30, 2008	XB360	89/100	88.62%
Fable II	Microsoft Game Studios	October 21, 2008	XB360	89/100	88.5%
Super Street Fighter II Turbo HD Remix	Capcom	November 26, 2008	XB360	88/100	88.79%
NHL 09	EA Sports	September 9, 2008	XB360	88/100	88.78%
Burnout Paradise	Electronic Arts	January 22, 2008	XB360	88/100	88.36%
FIFA Soccer 09	EA Sports	October 13, 2008	XB360	87/100	88.21%
Bionic Commando Rearmed	Capcom	August 13, 2008	XB360	85/100	88.07%
NHL 09	EA Sports	September 9, 2008	PS3	88/100	87.97%
Burnout Paradise	Electronic Arts	January 22, 2008	PS3	87/100	87.89%
Race Driver: Grid	Codemasters	May 30, 2008	WIN	87/100	87.87%
Super Street Fighter II Turbo HD Remix	Capcom	November 25, 2008	PS3	87/100	87.82%
Bionic Commando Rearmed	Capcom	August 13, 2008	PS3	87/100	87.67%
Wipeout HD	Sony Computer Entertainment	September 25, 2008	PS3	87/100	87.52%
Sins of a Solar Empire	Stardock	February 4, 2008	WIN	87/100	87.52%

=== Major awards ===
Category/Organization		26th Golden Joystick Awards October 31, 2008	VGA December 14, 2008	12th Annual Interactive Achievement Awards February 19, 2009	5th British Academy Games Awards March 10, 2009	9th Game Developers Choice Awards March 25, 2009
Game of the Year		Call of Duty 4: Modern Warfare	Grand Theft Auto IV	LittleBigPlanet	Super Mario Galaxy	Fallout 3
Independent / Debut (Note: Certain award presentations combine these categories.)		—N/a	World of Goo	—N/a		LittleBigPlanet
Downloadable		—N/a				World of Goo
Mobile/Handheld	Mobile	Bejeweled 2	Professor Layton and the Curious Village	Spore Origins	Professor Layton and the Curious Village	God of War: Chains of Olympus
Mobile/Handheld	Handheld	The Legend of Zelda: Phantom Hourglass	Professor Layton and the Curious Village	God of War: Chains of Olympus	Professor Layton and the Curious Village	God of War: Chains of Olympus
Innovation		—N/a		LittleBigPlanet	—N/a	LittleBigPlanet
Artistic Achievement or Graphics	Animation	—N/a	Metal Gear Solid 4: Guns of the Patriots	Prince of Persia	LittleBigPlanet	Prince of Persia
Artistic Achievement or Graphics	Art Direction	—N/a	Metal Gear Solid 4: Guns of the Patriots	LittleBigPlanet	LittleBigPlanet	Prince of Persia
Audio	Music	—N/a	Metal Gear Solid 4: Guns of the Patriots		Dead Space	Dead Space
Audio	Sound Design	—N/a	—N/a	Dead Space		Dead Space
Audio	Soundtrack	Grand Theft Auto IV	Rock Band 2		—N/a	Dead Space
Character or Performance	Actor	—N/a	Michael Hollick as Nico Bellic; Grand Theft Auto IV	Sackboy; LittleBigPlanet	—N/a	
Character or Performance	Actress	—N/a	Debi Mae West as Meryl Silverburgh; Metal Gear Solid 4: Guns of the Patriots	Sackboy; LittleBigPlanet	—N/a	
Game Direction or Design	Game Design	—N/a		World of Goo	Call of Duty 4: Modern Warfare	LittleBigPlanet
Game Direction or Design	Game Direction	—N/a		LittleBigPlanet	Call of Duty 4: Modern Warfare	LittleBigPlanet
Narrative	Adapted	—N/a		Star Wars: The Force Unleashed	Call of Duty 4: Modern Warfare	Fallout 3
Narrative	Original	—N/a		Fallout 3	Call of Duty 4: Modern Warfare	Fallout 3
Technical Achievement	Gameplay Engineering	—N/a		Spore	Spore	LittleBigPlanet
Technical Achievement	Visual Engineering	—N/a		LittleBigPlanet	Spore	LittleBigPlanet
Multiplayer/Online		Call of Duty 4: Modern Warfare	Left 4 Dead			—N/a
Action/Adventure	Action	—N/a	Grand Theft Auto IV	Dead Space	Fable II	—N/a
Action/Adventure	Adventure	—N/a	Grand Theft Auto IV	Mirror's Edge	Fable II	—N/a
Casual/Family or Rhythm	Casual	—N/a	Rock Band 2	Braid	Boom Blox	—N/a
Casual/Family or Rhythm	Family	—N/a	Rock Band 2	LittleBigPlanet	Boom Blox	—N/a
Fighting		—N/a	Soulcalibur IV	Super Smash Bros. Brawl	—N/a	—N/a
Role-Playing	RPG	—N/a	Fallout 3	Fallout 3	—N/a	—N/a
Role-Playing	MMORPG	—N/a	Fallout 3	World of Warcraft: Wrath of the Lich King	—N/a	—N/a
Sports	Individual	—N/a	Shaun White Snowboarding	NHL 09	Race Driver: Grid	—N/a
Sports	Team	—N/a	NHL 09	NHL 09	Race Driver: Grid	—N/a
Racing		—N/a	Burnout Paradise		—N/a	—N/a
Strategy/Simulation		—N/a		Command & Conquer: Red Alert 3	Civilization Revolution	—N/a
Special Award		—N/a	Gamer God	Hall of Fame	Academy Fellowship	Lifetime Achievement Award
Special Award		—N/a	Will Wright	Bruce Shelley	Nolan Bushnell	Hideo Kojima

== Major events ==
Date	Event	Ref.
June 28	Blizzard Entertainment announces Diablo III in Paris, France.	
July 15–17	E3 2008 in Los Angeles, California, United States.	
July 29	Game developers Joseph and Melissa Batten die in a murder-suicide.	
July 31 – August 3	QuakeCon 2008 at the Hilton Anatole in Dallas, Texas, United States.	
August 21–24	Games Convention in Leipzig, Germany.	
October 2–4	Nintendo conference held in San Francisco, United States and Tokyo, Japan.	
October 3–5	E for All at the Los Angeles Convention center in California, United States.	
October 9–12	Tokyo Game Show at the Makuhari Messe International Convention in Mihama-ku, Chiba, Japan.	
October 9–12	Games Convention Asia in Singapore.	
October 10–11	BlizzCon 2008 in Anaheim, California, United States.	
November 13	Zeebo was announced. The console is aiming for developing countries.	
December 1	National Amusements' Sumner Redstone sells his controlling stake in Midway Games to private investor Mark Thomas, for $100,000 ($0.0012 a share), and assumes $70 million of senior secured and unsecured debt.	
December 9	Infogrames, Atari's parent company, purchases Cryptic Studios.	
December 14	The 2008 Spike Video Game Awards were held.	

== Hardware releases ==
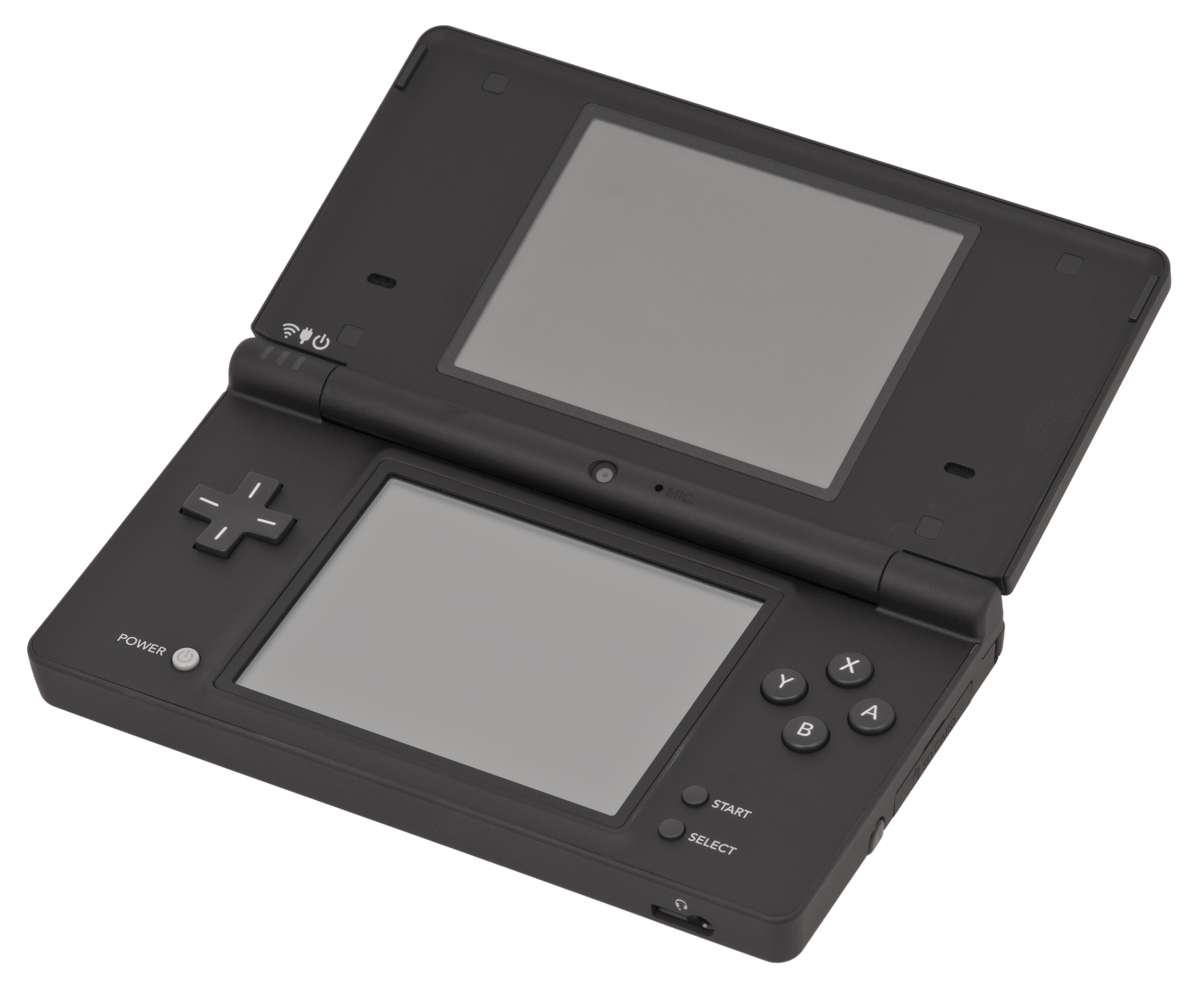
Nintendo DSi

Date	Console
August 22	LeapFrog Didj
November 1	Nintendo DSi^{JP}

== Games released in 2008 ==
Release Date	Title	Platform	Genre	Ref.
January 1	FlatOut 2	OSX		
January 2	Metal Slug 3	XB360		
January 3	Rune Factory 2: A Fantasy Harvest Moon	DS		
January 8	Brain Challenge	DS		
January 8	Harvey Birdman: Attorney at Law	PS2, PSP, Wii		
January 8	Jackass: The Game	DS		
January 8	Kingdom Under Fire: Circle of Doom	XB360		
January 8	Sonic Riders: Zero Gravity	PS2, Wii		
January 9	Omega Five	XB360		
January 15	CSI: Hard Evidence	Wii		
January 15	Nanostray 2	DS		
January 15	Nitrobike	Wii		
January 15	Samurai Warriors: Katana	Wii		
January 16	Rail Simulator	WIN		
January 17	Mario & Sonic at the Olympic Games	DS		
January 17	Tori-Emaki	PS3		
January 21	Advance Wars: Days of Ruin	DS		
January 22	Burnout Paradise	PS3, XB360		
January 22	No More Heroes	Wii		
January 22	Pirates of the Burning Sea	WIN		
January 24	PixelJunk Monsters	PSN		
January 29	The Sims Castaway Stories	WIN, OSX		
January 30	Rez HD	XB360		
January 31	Disgaea 3: Absence of Justice	PS3		
January 31	Super Smash Bros. Brawl (JP)	Wii		
January 31	We Ski	Wii		
February 4	Sins of a Solar Empire	WIN		
February 4	Zoo Tycoon 2 DS	DS		
February 5	Assassin's Creed: Altaïr's Chronicles	DS		
February 5	Culdcept Saga	XB360		
February 5	Devil May Cry 4	PS3, XB360		
February 5	Turok	PS3, XB360		
February 7	The Club	PS3, WIN, XB360		
February 7	Go! Puzzle	PS3, PSP		
February 7	Grand Chase	WIN		
February 7	L the Prologue to Death Note -Rasen no Wana-	DS		
February 8	Agatha Christie: And Then There Were None	Wii		
February 12	Conflict: Denied Ops	PS3, WIN, XB360		
February 12	Dark Messiah of Might and Magic	XB360		
February 12	Innocent Life: A Futuristic Harvest Moon	PS2		
February 12	Jumper: Griffin's Story	PS2, PS3, Wii, XB360		
February 12	Lost Odyssey	XB360		
February 12	Penumbra: Black Plague	LIN, WIN		
February 12	Wipeout Pulse	PSP		
February 14	Dream Chronicles 2: The Eternal Maze	WIN		
February 18	MX vs. ATV: Untamed	Wii		
February 18	Need for Speed: ProStreet	PSP		
February 19	Dragon Quest Swords: The Masked Queen and the Tower of Mirrors	Wii		
February 19	Dungeon Explorer: Warriors of Ancient Arts	DS, PSP		
February 19	Dynasty Warriors 6	PS3, XB360		
February 19	Pimp My Ride	Wii		
February 19	The History Channel: Battle for the Pacific	PS3		
February 20	N+	XB360		
February 21	Lost Planet: Extreme Condition	PS3		
February 21	Space Invaders Extreme	DS, PSP		
February 22	Barnyard Blast: Swine of the Night	DS		
February 25	Destroy All Humans! Big Willy Unleashed	Wii		
February 25	Frontlines: Fuel of War	WIN, XB360		
February 26	Bubble Bobble Double Shot	DS		
February 26	Lost: Via Domus	PS3, WIN, XB360		
February 26	Naruto: Ninja Destiny	DS		
February 26	Pinball Hall of Fame: The Williams Collection	PS2, PSP, Wii		
February 26	Turning Point: Fall of Liberty	PS3, WIN, XB360		
February 26	Universe at War: Earth Assault	XB360		
February 27	Blokus Portable: Steambot Championship	PSP		
February 27	Triggerheart Exelica	XB360		
February 28	The Idolmaster Live For You!	XB360		
February 28	The Sims 2: FreeTime	WIN		
March 1	Trials 2: Second Edition	WIN		
March 3	Bully: Scholarship Edition	Wii, XB360		
March 3	Major League Baseball 2K8	PS2, PS3, PSP, Wii, XB360		
March 4	Anno 1701: Dawn of Discovery	DS		
March 4	Army of Two	PS3, XB360		
March 4	Eco Creatures: Save the Forest	DS		
March 4	God of War: Chains of Olympus	PSP		
March 4	MLB 08: The Show	PS2, PS3, PSP		
March 4	Mystery Dungeon: Shiren the Wanderer	DS		
March 4	Ninja Reflex	Wii		
March 4	Silent Hill: Origins	PS2		
March 5	Harvest: Massive Encounter	OSX, WIN		
March 5	Rocketmen: Axis of Evil	XB360		
March 5	Warhammer 40,000: Dawn of War: Soulstorm	WIN		
March 6	Flow	PSP		
March 6	Yakuza: Kenzan!	PS3		
March 6	Rocketmen: Axis of Evil	PSN		
March 9	Super Smash Bros. Brawl (NA)	Wii		
March 10	Worms: A Space Oddity	Wii		
March 11	Buzz!: The Hollywood Quiz	PS2		
March 11	Condemned 2: Bloodshot	XB360		
March 11	George of the Jungle and the Search for the Secret	DS, PS2, Wii		
March 11	Insecticide	DS, WIN		
March 11	Ratchet & Clank: Size Matters	PS2		
March 11	The House of the Dead 2 & 3 Return	Wii		
March 11	Wild Arms XF	PSP		
March 12	Bliss Island	XB360		
March 17	Fantage	Browser		
March 18	Condemned 2: Bloodshot	PS3		
March 18	Enemy Territory: Quake Wars	OSX		
March 18	Everybody's Golf 5	PS3		
March 18	Pro Evolution Soccer 2008	Wii		
March 18	Sega Superstars Tennis	DS, PS2, PS3, Wii, XB360		
March 18	Target: Terror	Wii		
March 18	Tom Clancy's Rainbow Six: Vegas 2	PS3, WIN, XB360		
March 19	Deca Sports	Wii		
March 19	SimCity DS 2	DS		
March 20	Pokémon Ranger: Shadows of Almia (JP)	DS		
March 24	Command & Conquer 3: Kane's Wrath	WIN, XB360		
March 24	Crisis Core: Final Fantasy VII	PSP		
March 24	M&M's Kart Racing	DS		
March 25	ObsCure II	Wii		
March 25	Opoona	Wii		
March 25	Viking: Battle for Asgard	PS3, XB360		
March 26	GoPets: Vacation Island	DS		
March 28	Dark Sector	PS3, XB360		
March 28	Ninja Gaiden Dragon Sword	DS		
April 1	Brothers in Arms: Road to Hill 30	Wii		
April 2	Mr. Driller Online	XB360		
April 2	Star Ocean: Second Evolution	PSP		
April 4	FlatOut: Head On	PSP		
April 8	Assassin's Creed	WIN		
April 8	Baroque	PS2, Wii		
April 8	Supreme Commander	XB360		
April 9	Ikaruga	XB360		
April 10	Arcana Heart	PS2		
April 10	Mario Kart Wii (JP)	Wii		
April 15	Ōkami	Wii		
April 15	Rondo of Swords	DS		
April 15	Teenage Zombies: Invasion of the Alien Brain Thingys!	DS		
April 16	TrackMania Nations Forever	WIN		
April 18	Legacy of Ys: Books I & II	DS		
April 20	Pokémon Mystery Dungeon: Explorers of Time and Explorers of Darkness	DS		
April 21	Metal Arms: Glitch in the System	XB360		
April 22	High School Musical 2: Work This Out!	DS		
April 22	Persona 3 FES	PS2		
April 22	The World Ends with You	DS		
April 22	Turok	WIN		
April 24	Valkyria Chronicles	PS3		
April 25	King's Bounty: The Legend	WIN		
April 27	Mario Kart Wii (NA)	Wii		
April 29	Grand Theft Auto IV	PS3, XB360		
April 29	Let's Yoga	DS		
April 30	Galactic Civilizations II: Twilight of the Arnor	WIN		
May 1	Echochrome	PSN, PSP		
May 2	Iron Man	DS, PS2, PS3, PSP, Wii, WIN, XB360		
May 5	Chameleon	PSP		
May 5	Crosswords DS	DS		
May 5	The Destiny of Zorro	Wii		
May 6	Boom Blox	MOBI, Wii		
May 6	Speed Racer	DS, Wii		
May 12	LostWinds	Wii		
May 13	Castle of Shikigami III	Wii		
May 13	Drone Tactics	DS		
May 13	The Chronicles of Narnia: Prince Caspian	DS, PS2, PS3, PSP, Wii, WIN, XB360		
May 15	Dark Mist	PSN		
May 15	Luminous Arc 2: Will	DS		
May 17	Monster Madness: Grave Danger	PS3		
May 19	Critter Round-Up	Wii		
May 20	Age of Conan: Hyborian Adventures	WIN		
May 20	SingStar	PS3		
May 21	Penny Arcade Adventures: On the Rain-Slick Precipice of Darkness	LIN, OSX, WIN, XB360		
May 21	Wii Fit (NA)	Wii		
May 23	Haze	PS3		
May 26	Cross Edge	PS3		
May 26	Dr. Mario Online Rx	Wii		
May 27	Death Jr. II: Root of Evil	Wii		
May 27	Emergency Heroes	Wii		
May 27	Enemy Territory: Quake Wars	PS3, XB360		
May 27	Super Dodgeball Brawlers	DS		
May 28	Mass Effect	WIN		
May 30	Commando: Steel Disaster	DS		
May 30	Race Driver: Grid	PS3, WIN, XB360		
June 3	Chaos Wars	PS2		
June 3	Hot Shots Golf: Open Tee 2'	PSP		
June 3	Kung Fu Panda	DS, PS2, PS3, Wii, WIN, XB360		
June 3	Lego Indiana Jones: The Original Adventures	DS, PS2, PS3, PSP, Wii, WIN, XB, XB360		
June 3	Ninja Gaiden II	XB360		
June 3	Robert Ludlum's The Bourne Conspiracy	PS3, XB360		
June 3	Summon Night: Twin Age	DS		
June 4	Roogoo	XB360		
June 5	Dragon Ball Z: Burst Limit	PS3, XB360		
June 5	Fushigi no Dungeon – Furai no Shiren 3: Karakuri Yashiki no Nemuri Hime	Wii		
June 5	The Incredible Hulk	DS, PS2, PS3, Wii, XB360		
June 9	My Pokémon Ranch	Wii		
June 10	Blast Works: Build, Trade, Destroy	Wii		
June 10	Don King Presents: Prizefighter	XB360		
June 10	Dragon Ball Z: Burst Limit	PS3, XB360		
June 10	NASCAR 09	PS2, PS3, XB360		
June 10	The Incredible Hulk	WIN		
June 11	Frogger 2	XB360		
June 11	Jake Hunter: Detective Chronicles	DS		
June 12	Metal Gear Solid 4: Guns of the Patriots	PS3		
June 13	Civilization Revolution	PS3, XB360		
June 13	Etrian Odyssey II: Heroes of Lagaard	DS		
June 17	Deadliest Catch: Alaskan Storm	XB360		
June 17	Secret Agent Clank	PSP		
June 17	Supreme Ruler 2020	WIN		
June 17	Wacky Races: Crash and Dash	DS, Wii		
June 18	Elements of Destruction	XB360		
June 18	Fishdom	DS		
June 19	Fatal Inertia EX	PS3		
June 19	Mario Super Sluggers	Wii		
June 19	Requiem: Memento Mori (NA)	WIN		
June 20	Alone in the Dark	PS2, Wii, WIN, XB360		
June 20	Code Lyoko: Fall of X.A.N.A.	DS		
June 20	Top Spin 3	PS3, Wii, XB360		
June 22	Guitar Hero: On Tour	DS		
June 22	Rock Band	Wii		
June 23	Battlefield: Bad Company	PS3, XB360		
June 23	Gyrostarr	Wii		
June 23	Top Spin 3	DS		
June 24	WALL-E	DS, PS2, PS3, PSP, Wii, WIN, XB360		
June 24	Big Beach Sports	Wii		
June 24	Hellboy: The Science of Evil	PS3, PSP, XB360		
June 24	Mega Man Star Force 2	DS		
June 25	Happy Tree Friends: False Alarm	XB360, WIN		
June 26	Disgaea DS: Prince of the Demon World and the Red Moon	DS		
June 26	Tales of Symphonia: Dawn of the New World	Wii		
June 29	Guitar Hero: Aerosmith	PS2, PS3, Wii, XB360		
June 30	Journey to the Center of the Earth	DS		
June 30	Magnetica	Wii		
July 1	Elements of Destruction	WIN		
July 1	Trauma Center: Under the Knife 2	DS		
July 1	Soul Bubbles	DS		
July 3	1 vs. 100	DS		
July 3	Initial D Extreme Stage	PS3		
July 3	Nanashi no Game	DS		
July 3	Unreal Tournament 3	XB360		
July 7	Song Summoner: The Unsung Heroes	iOS		
July 7	SPOGS Racing	Wii		
July 7	Zen Pinball: Rollercoaster	iOS		
July 8	Beijing 2008	PS3, XB360		
July 8	Civilization Revolution	DS		
July 8	Devil May Cry 4	WIN		
July 8	Final Fantasy Fables: Chocobo's Dungeon	Wii		
July 10	Critter Crunch	iOS		
July 10	Resident Evil Zero	Wii		
July 10	Persona 4	PS2		
July 11	Dynasty Warriors 6	WIN		
July 11	Nancy Drew: The Phantom of Venice	WIN		
July 14	Major League Eating: The Game	Wii		
July 15	Mister Slime	DS		
July 15	NCAA Football 09	PS2, PS3, PSP, Wii, XB360		
July 15	Space Chimps	DS, PS2, Wii, WIN, XB360		
July 15	We Love Golf!	Wii		
July 16	Double D Dodgeball	XB360		
July 17	Dragon Quest V: Hand of the Heavenly Bride	DS		
July 17	Elefunk	PSN		
July 17	Rayman	PSN		
July 17	Tears to Tiara: Kakan no Daichi	PS3		
July 22	New International Track & Field	DS		
July 22	The Mummy: Tomb of the Dragon Emperor	DS, PS2, PS3, Wii, XB360		
July 23	1942: Joint Strike	XB360		
July 23	Go! Go! Break Steady	XB360		
July 24	1942: Joint Strike	PSN		
July 24	Guitar Hero III: Legends of Rock	XB360		
July 24	Siren: Blood Curse	PS3		
July 24	Wario Land: The Shake Dimension	Wii		
July 28	Pong Toss! Frat Party Games	Wii		
July 29	MLB Power Pros 2008	PS2, Wii		
July 29	Soulcalibur IV	PS3, XB360		
July 29	Spectral Force 3: Innocent Rage	XB360		
July 30	Geometry Wars: Retro Evolved 2	XB360		
July 31	Fatal Frame IV	Wii		
July 31	Phantasy Star Portable	PSP		
July 31	Rhythm Heaven (JP)	DS		
August 1	Race Driver: Grid	DS		
August 4	Reset Generation	WIN		
August 4	Wild West Guns	Wii		
August 6	Braid	XB360		
August 7	Fire Emblem: Shadow Dragon	DS		
August 7	Hannah Montana: Spotlight World Tour	PS2		
August 7	Tales of Vesperia	XB360		
August 12	Bangai-O Spirits	DS		
August 12	Space Siege	WIN		
August 13	Bionic Commando Rearmed	XB360		
August 13	Madden NFL 09	DS, PS2, PS3, PSP, Wii, XB360, XB		
August 14	Bionic Commando Rearmed	PSN, WIN		
August 19	The Cheetah Girls: Passport to Stardom	DS		
August 19	Deadliest Catch: Alaskan Storm	WIN		
August 19	Too Human	XB360		
August 21	Ratchet & Clank Future: Quest for Booty	PS3		
August 21	Sigma Harmonics	DS		
August 22	Inazuma Eleven	DS		
August 25	Helix	Wii		
August 25	MLB Power Pros 2008	DS		
August 26	Digimon World Championship	DS		
August 26	FlatOut: Ultimate Carnage	WIN		
August 26	From the Abyss	DS		
August 26	My Chinese Coach	DS		
August 26	N+	DS, PSP		
August 26	The Quest Trio	DS		
August 26	The Sims 2: Apartment Life	WIN		
August 26	The Sims 2: Apartment Pets	DS		
August 26	Tiger Woods PGA Tour 09	PS2, PS3, PSP, Wii, XB360		
August 27	Castle Crashers	XB360		
August 28	Afrika	PS3		
August 28	Asphalt 4: Elite Racing	iOS		
August 28	Captain Rainbow	Wii		
August 28	The Last Guy	PS3		
August 29	Spy Fox in "Dry Cereal"	Wii		
August 31	Mercenaries 2: World in Flames	PS2, PS3, WIN, XB360		
September 2	Infinite Undiscovery	XB360		
September 2	Rapala Fishing Frenzy 2009	PS3, Wii, XB360		
September 2	Vampire Rain: Altered Species	PS3		
September 2	Viva Piñata: Trouble in Paradise	XB360		
September 3	Shred Nebula	XB360		
September 4	Blue Dragon Plus	DS		
September 5	FaceBreaker	PS3, XB360		
September 5	S.T.A.L.K.E.R.: Clear Sky	WIN		
September 5	Spore	OSX, MOBI, DS, WIN		
September 5	Viva Piñata: Pocket Paradise	DS		
September 8	Air Traffic Chaos	DS		
September 8	Lock's Quest	DS		
September 8	NHL 2K9	PS2, PS3, Wii, XB360		
September 9	Hell's Kitchen: The Game	DS, PS2, Wii, XB360		
September 9	NHL 09	PS3, Wii, XB360		
September 9	TNA iMPACT!	PS2, PS3, Wii, XB360		
September 9	Yakuza 2	PS2		
September 9	Zoids Assault	XB360		
September 11	One Piece: Unlimited Cruise: Episode 1	Wii		
September 12	Crysis Warhead	WIN		
September 13	Pokémon Platinum (JP)	DS		
September 14	Rock Band 2	XB360		
September 15	Drawn to Life: SpongeBob SquarePants Edition	DS		
September 16	Armored Core: For Answer	PS3, XB360		
September 16	Battle Fantasia	XB360		
September 16	Crysis Warhead	WIN		
September 16	Dance Dance Revolution Hottest Party 2	Wii		
September 16	Dance Dance Revolution X	PS2		
September 16	Speed Racer: The Videogame	PS2		
September 16	Star Wars: The Force Unleashed	DS, PS2, PS3, PSP, Wii		
September 16	The Witcher: Enhanced Edition	WIN		
September 16	Pure	PS3, XB360, WIN		
September 18	Dragon Ball: Origins	DS		
September 18	Eternal Sonata	PS3		
September 18	Scoops	iOS		
September 18	Warhammer Online: Age of Reckoning	WIN		
September 19	Igor: The Game	DS, Wii, WIN		
September 22	Civilization IV: Colonization	WIN		
September 22	De Blob	DS, Wii, WIN		
September 22	Di-Gata Defenders	DS, PS2, PS3, Wii, XB360		
September 22	Kirby Super Star Ultra	DS		
September 22	Mega Man 9	Wii		
September 22	SimCity Creator	Wii		
September 22	EA Sports 08 Collection	WIN		
September 23	B-Boy	PSP		
September 23	Brothers in Arms: Double Time	Wii		
September 23	Brothers in Arms: Hell's Highway	PS3, XB360		
September 23	Buzz!: Master Quiz	PSP		
September 23	Dinosaur King	PS2, DS, Wii, XB360		
September 23	Hi Hamtaro! Little Hamsters Big Adventure	DS		
September 23	Lego Batman: The Videogame	DS, PS2, PS3, PSP, Wii, WIN, XB360		
September 23	Microsoft Tinker	WIN		
September 23	Shaun the Sheep	DS		
September 23	Time Hollow	DS		
September 24	Duke Nukem 3D	XB360		
September 25	Aquanaut's Holiday: Hidden Memories	PS3		
September 25	Cross Edge	PS3		
September 25	Disaster: Day of Crisis	Wii		
September 25	Geon	PS3		
September 25	Janline	XB360		
September 25	Mega Man 9	PSN		
September 25	Sands of Destruction	DS		
September 25	Wipeout HD	PSN		
September 25	World Destruction: Michibikareshi Ishi	DS		
September 30	Silent Hill: Homecoming	PS3, WIN, XB360		
September 30	Sonic Chronicles: The Dark Brotherhood	DS		
September 30	Tornado	DS		
September 30	Unsolved Crimes	DS		
October 1	Mega Man 9	XB360		
October 2	Dynasty Warriors 6	PS2		
October 2	Ikki Tousen: Eloquent Fist	PSP		
October 2	Work Time Fun	PSN		
October 4	Meat Boy	WEB		
October 5	Fieldrunners	iOS		
October 7	Bleach: Dark Souls	DS		
October 7	Brothers in Arms: Hell's Highway	WIN		
October 7	Crash: Mind over Mutant	PS2, Wii, XB360, PSP		
October 7	Crash: Mind over Mutant	DS		
October 7	Fracture	PS3, XB360		
October 7	Guilty Gear 2: Overture	XB360		
October 7	NBA Live 09	PS2, PS3, PSP, Wii, XB360		
October 7	NBA 2K9	PS2, PS3, Wii, XB360		
October 7	Spectrobes: Beyond the Portals	DS		
October 8	MLB Stickball	XB360		
October 8	The Legend of Kage 2	DS		
October 9	Linger in Shadows	PS3		
October 9	Macross Ace Frontier	PSP		
October 9	Supersonic Acrobatic Rocket-Powered Battle-Cars	PS3		
October 9	Snoopy DS: Let's Go Meet Snoopy and His Friends!	DS		
October 13	Avatar: The Last Airbender – Into the Inferno	DS, PS2, Wii		
October 13	Blitz: The League II	PS3, XB360		
October 13	Cubello	Wii		
October 13	Prey the Stars	DS		
October 13	Tak: Mojo Mistake	DS		
October 13	World of Goo	WIN, Wii		
October 14	Dead Space	PS3, XB360		
October 14	FIFA 09	MOBI, DS, PS2, PS3, PSP, Wii, WIN, XB360		
October 14	Rock Revolution	DS, PS3, Wii, XB360		
October 14	Saints Row 2	PS3, XB360		
October 14	SOCOM U.S. Navy SEALs: Confrontation	PS3		
October 14	Golden Axe: Beast Rider	PS3, XB360		
October 14	Boogie Superstar	Wii		
October 15	Age of Booty	XB360		
October 16	Culdcept DS	DS		
October 16	Nancy Drew: The Haunting of Castle Malloy	WIN		
October 16	Wii Music	Wii		
October 16	X3: Terran Conflict	WIN		
October 19	Rock Band 2	PS3		
October 20	Back at the Barnyard: Slop Bucket Games	DS		
October 20	Celebrity Sports Showdown	Wii		
October 20	Midnight Club: Los Angeles	PS3, XB360, PSP		
October 20	NHL 09	WIN		
October 20	Dead Space	WIN		
October 20	SpongeBob SquarePants Featuring Nicktoons: Globs of Doom	PS2, Wii, DS		
October 20	The Naked Brothers Band: The Video Game	DS, PS2, Wii, WIN		
October 21	Bully: Scholarship Edition	WIN		
October 21	BioShock	PS3		
October 21	Castlevania: Order of Ecclesia	DS		
October 21	Crash: Mind over Mutant	PSP		
October 21	Dance Dance Revolution Universe 3	XB360		
October 21	Disney Think Fast	Wii		
October 21	Far Cry 2	PS3, WIN, XB360		
October 21	Fable II	XB360		
October 21	Jillian Michaels' Fitness Ultimatum 2009	Wii		
October 21	Little Red Riding Hood's Zombie BBQ	DS		
October 21	Naruto: Clash of Ninja Revolution 2	Wii		
October 21	Spider-Man: Web of Shadows	DS, PS2, PS3, PSP, Wii, WIN, XB360		
October 21	The Legend of Spyro: Dawn of the Dragon	DS, PS2, PS3, Wii, XB360		
October 21	Transformers Animated: The Game	DS		
October 21	NBA 2K9	WIN		
October 21	What's Cooking? with Jamie Oliver	DS		
October 23	Prince of Persia Classic	PSN		
October 26	Casper's Scare School	DS		
October 26	Guitar Hero World Tour	OSX, PS2, PS3, Wii, WIN, XB360		
October 27	All Star Cheer Squad	DS, Wii		
October 27	MySims Kingdom	DS, Wii		
October 28	Ben 10: Alien Force	DS, PS2, PSP, Wii		
October 28	Command & Conquer: Red Alert 3	WIN		
October 28	Dora the Explorer: Dora Saves the Snow Princess	DS, PS2, Wii		
October 28	Fallout 3	PS3, WIN, XB360		
October 28	Go, Diego, Go!: The Great Dinosaur Rescue	DS, PS2, Wii		
October 28	Goosebumps HorrorLand	DS, PS2, Wii		
October 28	LittleBigPlanet	PS3		
October 28	MotorStorm: Pacific Rift	PS3		
October 28	MySims	WIN		
October 28	Ninjatown	DS		
October 29	Penny Arcade Adventures: On the Rain-Slick Precipice of Darkness – Episode 2	LIN, OSX, WIN, XB360		
October 30	Away: Shuffle Dungeon	DS		
October 30	Valkyrie Profile: Covenant of the Plume	DS		
October 31	Master of the Monster Lair	DS		
November 3	Alien Crush Returns	Wii		
November 4	Dragon Ball Z: Infinite World	PS2		
November 4	Dragon Ball: Origins	DS		
November 4	Bratz Kidz	DS, Wii		
November 4	KORG DS-10	DS		
November 4	Legendary	PS3, WIN, XB360		
November 4	Madagascar: Escape 2 Africa	PS3, PS2, XB360, WIN, Wii, DS		
November 4	Naruto: Ultimate Ninja Storm	PS3		
November 4	Tom Clancy's EndWar	DS, PS3, PSP, XB360		
November 4	Resistance 2	PS3		
November 4	Namco Museum Virtual Arcade	XB360		
November 5	Exit	DS		
November 5	Kung Fu Panda: Legendary Warriors	DS, Wii		
November 7	Gears of War 2	XB360		
November 7	Men of War	WIN		
November 7	Sacred 2 Fallen Angel	WIN		
November 10	Pokémon Ranger: Shadows of Almia (NA)	DS		
November 11	Banjo-Kazooie: Nuts & Bolts	XB360		
November 11	Call of Duty: World at War	DS, PS3, Wii, WIN, XB360, PS2		
November 11	Command & Conquer: Red Alert 3	XB360		
November 11	Eternal Poison	PS2		
November 11	FaceBreaker	Wii		
November 11	Guinness World Records: The Videogame	DS, Wii		
November 11	Mirror's Edge	PS3, XB360		
November 11	WWE SmackDown vs. Raw 2009	MOBI, DS, PS2, PS3, PSP, Wii, XB360		
November 11	Star Wars: The Clone Wars – Lightsaber Duels	Wii		
November 11	Star Wars: The Clone Wars – Jedi Alliance	DS		
November 11	Tecmo Bowl: Kickoff	DS		
November 12	Pro Evolution Soccer 2009	PS2, PS3, PSP, Wii, WIN, XB360		
November 13	World of Warcraft: Wrath of the Lich King	WIN, OSX		
November 14	Football Manager 2009	WIN, OSX, PSP		
November 16	Animal Crossing: City Folk	Wii		
November 16	Mortal Kombat vs. DC Universe	PS3, XB360		
November 16	Shaun White Snowboarding	PS3, Wii, WIN, XB360		
November 17	Guitar Hero On Tour: Decades	DS		
November 17	Robocalypse	DS		
November 17	Skate It	DS, Wii		
November 18	Alone in the Dark: Inferno	PS3		
November 18	Avatar: The Last Airbender – Into the Inferno	PS3, XB360		
November 18	Bolt	DS, PS2, PS3, Wii, WIN, XB360		
November 18	Cooking Mama: World Kitchen	Wii		
November 18	Cradle of Rome	DS		
November 18	Ultimate Band	DS, Wii		
November 18	Castlevania Judgment	Wii		
November 18	Iron Chef America: Supreme Cuisine	DS		
November 18	Left 4 Dead	WIN, XB360		
November 18	Need for Speed: Undercover	MOBI, PS2, PS3, PSP, Wii, WIN, XB360		
November 18	Sonic Unleashed	PS2, PS3, Wii, XB360		
November 18	SpongeBob SquarePants Featuring Nicktoons: Globs of Doom	PS3, PSP, XB360		
November 18	Tomb Raider: Underworld	DS, PS2, PS3, Wii, WIN, XB360		
November 18	Tony Hawk's Motion	DS		
November 18	Rayman Raving Rabbids: TV Party	DS, Wii		
November 18	Naruto: The Broken Bond	XB360		
November 18	CSI: NY	WIN		
November 18	You're in the Movies	XB360		
November 19	Weapon of Choice	XB360		
November 20	Gallop & Ride	Wii		
November 20	The Last Remnant	XB360		
November 21	LocoRoco 2	PSP		
November 21	Beyond Protocol	WIN		
November 23	Brothers in Arms: Hour of Heroes	iOS		
November 25	Chrono Trigger	DS		
November 25	Club Penguin: Elite Penguin Force	DS		
November 25	Iron Chef America: Supreme Cuisine	Wii		
November 25	Neopets Puzzle Adventure	DS		
November 25	Winter Sports 2: The Next Challenge	DS, PS2, Wii, XB360		
November 27	Patapon 2	PSP		
November 27	Rune Factory Frontier	Wii		
December 1	Destroy All Humans! Path of the Furon	XB360		
December 1	Space Invaders Get Even	Wii		
December 2	Grand Theft Auto IV	WIN		
December 2	Kingdom Hearts Re:Chain of Memories	PS2		
December 2	Mushroom Men: Rise of the Fungi	DS		
December 2	Mushroom Men: The Spore Wars	Wii		
December 2	Nancy Drew: The White Wolf of Icicle Creek	Wii		
December 2	Prince of Persia	PS3, XB360		
December 2	Prince of Persia: The Fallen King	DS		
December 2	Safecracker: The Ultimate Puzzle Adventure	Wii		
December 4	428: Shibuya Scramble	Wii		
December 4	Everyday Shooter	PSP		
December 4	Rygar: The Battle of Argus	Wii		
December 4	Söldner-X: Himmelsstürmer	PSN		
December 5	X3: Reunion	LIN		
December 7	Prey	LIN		
December 8	Defense Grid: The Awakening	WIN		
December 8	Hockey Allstar Shootout	Wii		
December 9	Prince of Persia	WIN		
December 10	Meteos	XB360		
December 10	PowerUp Forever	XB360		
December 11	Elebits: The Adventures of Kai and Zero	DS		
December 11	PowerUp Forever	PSN		
December 14	I Love Katamari	iOS		
December 15	Big Kahuna Party	Wii		
December 17	Dash of Destruction	XB360		
December 18	Rise of the Argonauts	PS3, WIN, XB360		
December 18	Dissidia: Final Fantasy	PSP		
December 18	Dynasty Warriors: Gundam 2	PS2, PS3, XB360		
December 18	Suikoden Tierkreis	DS		
December 18	Tales of Hearts	DS		
December 23	Crystal Defenders	iOS		
December 23	Lumines Supernova	PS3		
December 25	White Knight Chronicles	PS3		
December 25	RIZ-ZOAWD	DS		
December 29	MaBoShi: The Three Shape Arcade	Wii		
December 31	Shin Megami Tensei: Imagine (NA)	WIN		

== Video game-based film and television releases ==
Title	Date	Director	Distributor(s)	Franchise	Original game publisher	Ref.
Persona: Trinity Soul	January 5, 2008	Atsushi Matsumoto	Aniplex	Persona	Atlus	
Giratina & the Sky Warrior	July 19, 2008	Kunihiko Yuyama	Toho	Pokémon	Game Freak	
Far Cry	October 2, 2008	Uwe Boll	20th Century Studios	Far Cry	Ubisoft	
Resident Evil: Degeneration	October 17, 2008	Makoto Kamiya	Sony Pictures Entertainment Japan	Resident Evil	Capcom	
Max Payne	October 17, 2008	John Moore	20th Century Studios	Max Payne	Rockstar Games	

== See also ==
- 2008 in esports
- 2008 in games
