= Help Wanted (video game) =

2008 action puzzle video game

- North American box art
- Developer: Hudson Soft
- Publisher: Hudson Soft
- Platform: Wii
- Release: JP: November 27, 2008; EU: March 13, 2009; AU: March 27, 2009; NA: May 12, 2009
- Genres: Action, puzzle
- Modes: Single-player, multiplayer

Help Wanted: 50 Wacky Jobs! (or Help Wanted for short), known as Hataraku Hito: Hard Working People (はたらくヒト, Hataraku Hito) in Japan, and Job Island: Hard Working People in the PAL region, is a game that features a collection of various Wii Remote-based minigames. The game offers a story mode (Employment Office), quick play mode (Career Fair), and multiplayer mode (Job Battle). However, only 15 of the 50 jobs can be played in multiplayer mode. The game is developed and published by Hudson Soft and was released in Japan for Nintendo's Wii on November 27, 2008, in Europe on March 13, 2009, in Australia on March 27, 2009, and in North America on May 12, 2009.

The game's artwork and presentation as a multi-game compilation is reminiscent of the Deca Sports video game series also developed by Hudson Soft, and its European title implies that the game is ostensibly a spin-off of such series, which is titled Sports Island there.

== Story ==
The planet, Earth, is now at risk after a horrible incident. In the NAZA Space Research Center, a group of men encounter a huge meteor that is striking Earth. Meanwhile, in the Executive Mansion, the president gets a call from NAZA, telling them that the meteor is coming. Inspecting the meteor, they both see an alien behind the meteor and survive when the NAZA S.R.C gets destroyed by the piece of the meteor; however, all four of the men survived without injury under a cost of hope.

Meanwhile, there lived a happy family. The big siblings/protagonists (Tom and Maya), the grandparents, the parents, the three little kids - Ann, Fran, and Stan - and their dog are watching the TV Shopping Network. As they turn on the TV with a remote, Barry appears and advertises the Transformowatch - an expensive gadget that turns anyone into a gigantic superhero. Ann, Fran, and Stan tell mom that they want the toy. As they talk about the gadget, Gramps tells them that he's checking out Geezer's comet. Tom and Maya join him on the balcony with Gramps' telescope. Seeing the meteor, Gramps warns that the end of the world is coming; everyone but the big siblings doubt it. Gramps tells Maya and Tom to get temporary jobs and shop for the sake of humanity. After a meteor is destroyed, the family celebrates until a meteor with a realistic face appears. Meanwhile, members of NAZA saw the meteor exploding, giving the members a ray of hope. According to their observations, more planet-sized objects are heading towards the planet.

Gramps theorizes and commands his grandchildren to work for the sake of mankind. Tom and Maya work hard for a paycheck worth the items of Points Channel. As days pass by, they experience dangers, benefits, and challenges at the beginning of the day while the gigantic object goes closer to Earth. If the number of days hits zero and the player is unable to repel the object, Gramps tries to defeat the object, but accidentally destroys the Memorial Hall after defeat, making the family pay the destruction until it is rebuilt, afterwards, gramps and the family come back home and gramps tells tom or maya that he grabbed part of the object as a kind of souvenir and shows them the part he collected, but accidentally throws it at the protagonist causing their graphics to change to something related to the object (e.g. in the case of the stone face, Either tom or maya will look a little too realistic, and in the case of the thumbed ramen, either one of them will have a bowl of ramen on his/her head), gramps apologizes and estimates that the protagonist will return to normal in two in-game weeks. After the eighth object was defeated, they discover the cause of all planet-sized objects, the Space Codger. After defeating the Space Codger, Gramps and the big kids celebrate; however, it's too early.

The Space Codger gets out the ultimate weapon from his underwear, the Monumental Thingy. Gramps warns Tom and Maya if that hits Earth, it'll eat Earth by changing its appearance, and everyone and all creatures will live in eternal suspicion with nobody to trust anyone else. Meanwhile, at the wrecked NAZA - small shack and the members - site, they get back online and finds out the fragment that destroyed the center was from the Space Codger's weapon. Barry, who reveals his face to the others, strikes with anger to the point of being shaped like the Point Channel's Scary Mask product. Finding a way to stop the big one, they change to their TV channel outfits and resume their duty, revealing the TV Shopping Channel hosts are undercover NAZA members.

After defeating the thing, it shatters and it gets worse as fragments begin to fall to Earth, but a helicopter comes to their house with Barry. He informs the heroic family that they receive a fire extinguisher with a bonus pack lasting for 10 years. The family works together as they launch the fragments away from Earth with a huge blast. The planet is saved while Gramps gets blasted off. Gramps is later rescued, then informs them that they're heading to space and blasts the family to the moon. During a second launch, their house was destroyed when they landed back in their house's position. After they rebuilt their home, they spent their lives as regular citizens and had a happy life from now on.

If the player buys the Transformowatch in the final battle, the big sibling will transform via the watch, but Gramps interrupts the transformation sequence. In a second attempt with a successful transformation, the big sibling becomes a superhero and destroys the Monumental Thingy, saving humanity. After the destruction of Space Codger's Monumental Thingy, Gramps uses the Transformowatch, then the siblings retaliate via using Transformowatch; Gramps' defeat leads to the destruction of their home. After the siblings complain to Gramps for using the watch from the TV Shopping Channel, the family lives in peace.

== Gameplay ==
Help Wanted is essentially a mini-game collection that utilizes the Wii's motion control capabilities. Some games require the Nunchuk attachment while others do not. There are 50 mini-games in total, some of which the user begins with by default and others that they must unlock in the Employment Office mode. For these to be unlocked, the user must purchase outfits about the minigame via the TV Shopping Channel's Uniform Channel.

Each minigame represents different: real-world and fictional jobs. Therefore, these minigames are also referred to as jobs. Each job has three difficulties: Normal, Hard, and Expert. Initially, the user only has access to the Normal difficulty of a job, while the other difficulties must be unlocked via the Employment Office mode. To unlock other difficulties, the user must achieve different ranks by playing the jobs a sufficient amount. The ranks include Newbie, Pro, Expert, and Master. By default, the user has the rank Newbie. But as they unlock further ranks, they will gain access to the difficulties of Hard and Expert.

In the Career Fair mode, the user can choose to play any of the 50 jobs, and any difficulty of that job, as long as they have it unlocked (by default or via Employment Office). They can also select to play as characters exclusive to the Career Fair and Job Battle mode. In the Job Battle mode, two users/players can fight against each other in jobs. Though unlike the 50 jobs in the Career Fair, there are only 15 available. The 50 jobs in the Career Fair/Employment Office include:

1. Cleaning Crew
2. Newscaster
3. Astronaut
4. Babysitter
5. Tropical Waiting Staff
6. Resort Captain
7. Bodybuilder
8. Master Higgins
9. Supermarket Clerk
10. Chef
11. Dairy Farmer
12. Dentist
13. CEO
14. Dry Cleaner
15. Hospital EMT
16. Personal Trainer
17. Farmer
18. Firefighter
19. Fisher
20. Arctic Delivery
21. Game Creator
22. Goalie
23. Grill Cook
24. Haunted House Crew
25. Interpreter
26. Line Judge
27. Interviewer
28. Kabuki Actor
29. Clown
30. Lighting Crew
31. Makeup Artist
32. Manicurist
33. Courier
34. Pinch Hitter
35. Pit Crew
36. Pizza Chef
37. Police Officer
38. Crane Operator
39. Art Restorer
40. Security Guard
41. Aerial Photographer
42. Stuntperson
43. Deep-sea Diver
44. Sumo Referee
45. Action Hero
46. Sushi Master
47. Tailor
48. Teacher
49. Cameraperson
50. TV Shopping Crew

== Development and release ==
The game's European release was announced by Hudson and Konami in August 2008 under the name Hard Working People. In November, it was renamed to Job Island following the high sales of Sports Island, with the original name remaining as a subtitle.

== Reception ==
Reception

Aggregate score
Aggregator	Score
Metacritic	65/100

Review scores
Publication	Score
4Players	38%
Famitsu	31/40
Gamekult	4/10
GamesMaster	55%
GameSpot	7/10
GamesRadar+	3/5
GameZone	7/10
Jeuxvideo.com	10/20
NGamer	65%
Nintendo Life	8/10
Nintendo Power	4/10
Nintendo World Report	7/10
Official Nintendo Magazine	78%

The game received "mixed" reviews according to the review aggregation website Metacritic. In Japan, however, Famitsu gave it a score of two eights, one seven, and one eight for a total of 31 out of 40.
