= Celebrity Sports Showdown =

2008 video game

- Developer: EA Canada
- Publisher: EA Sports Freestyle
- Platform: Wii
- Release: NA: October 20, 2008
- Genre: Sports
- Modes: Single-player, multiplayer

Celebrity Sports Showdown is a sports video game for the Wii developed by EA Canada, and was the first title released under the EA Sports Freestyle label. The game features ten sporting and musical celebrities competing against each other in a number of sporting events. Through playing the twelve mini-games, a number of non-celebrity characters can be unlocked as well.

== Gameplay ==
Similar to other sports games collections on the Wii such as Wii Sports, Big Beach Sports and Deca Sports, Celebrity Sports Showdown uses the motion detection of the Wii Remote for control. For example, in the canoeing event players must hold the Wii Remote sideways while performing a rowing motion as with a real set of paddles, while the inner tube and skiing events use quick gestures to perform tricks or jumps as the player tilts the controller to steer.

Players can compete either on their own or in a team of up to four members.

== Celebrities ==
- Fergie
- Avril Lavigne
- LeAnn Rimes
- Keith Urban
- Nelly Furtado
- Paul Pierce
- Mia Hamm
- Kristi Yamaguchi
- Reggie Bush
- Sugar Ray Leonard

== Sports ==
- Beach Volleyball
- Inner-Tubing
- Wild Water Canoeing
- Hurdle Derby
- Slalom Showdown
- Cliff Hangers
- Smash Badminton
- Rapid Fire Archery
- Joust Duel
- Curling
- Arena Dodgeball
- Air Racers

== Reception ==
Reception

Aggregate scores
| Aggregator | Score |
|---|---|
| GameRankings | 50.92% |
| Metacritic | 50/100 |

Review scores
| Publication | Score |
|---|---|
| Eurogamer | 6/10 |
| IGN | 4/10 |
| Nintendo Life | 5/10 |

Celebrity Sports Showdown received mixed reviews from critics. On Metacritic, the game holds a score of 50/100 based on 12 reviews.

Ellie Gibson of Eurogamer gave the game a 6/10, praising it for having "decent" mini-games but criticizing the game's presentation for being "rubbish" in terms of the character design and level art. Matt Casamassina of IGN was less forgiving of the game, giving it 4/10 while criticizing its selection of mini-games, implementation of the Wii's controls, and depiction of the celebrities.
