= Deca Sports 2 =

2009 Wii video game

- Developer: Hudson Soft
- Publisher: Hudson Soft
- Series: Deca Sports
- Platform: Wii
- Release: JP: 16 April 2009; EU: 15 May 2009; AU: 4 June 2009; NA: 29 September 2009
- Genre: Sports
- Modes: Single-player, multiplayer

Deca Sports 2, known as Deca Sporta 2: Wii de Sports "10" Shumoku! (デカスポルタ2 Wiiでスポーツ“10”種目！, Deka Suporuta 2 Wii de Supōtsu "10" Shumoku!) in Japan, Deca Sporta 2 in Australia, and Sports Island 2 in Europe, is a sports video game developed and published by Hudson Soft for the Wii as the sequel to Deca Sports. The game was released across three regions from April to September 2009.

== Gameplay ==
Deca Sports 2 features ten new sports: darts, dodgeball, ice hockey, kendo, mogul skiing, motorcycle racing, pétanque, speed skating, synchronized swimming and tennis, all controlled with the motion controls of the Wii Remote, with some sports requiring the Nunchuk. The same four modes from the first game (Open Match, League, Tournament and Challenge) also return for the sequel. There are eight preset teams available to play as, each with varying athlete sizes that impart their own strengths and weaknesses. As with the first game, there is a fatigue system in the League mode that requires players to avoid over-using athletes in order to excel across all ten sports.

New features include the ability to create custom teams, utilization of the Nunchuk's motion sensor for two-handed sports action in two of the four sports that require it, a new skill point system similar to Wii Sports that awards points for wins and detracts points for losses to unlock new AI difficulty levels and online multiplayer via Nintendo Wi-Fi Connection for select sports, whether through real-time competition or online leaderboards.

== Development ==
Hudson Soft polled fans in the forums of Deca Sports' official website to determine the ten sports that would be in the sequel. While the game was released around the time Nintendo launched the Wii MotionPlus accessory, the development team stated that it came too late for them to consider integrating into Deca Sports 2, and it was ultimately implemented in Deca Sports 3.

== Reception ==
Reception

Aggregate score
Aggregator	Score
Metacritic	49/100

Review scores
Publication	Score
Famitsu	28/40
Gamekult	3/10
GamePro	2/5
GameSpot	4/10
IGN	5.3/10
Jeuxvideo.com	8/20
NGamer	61%
Nintendo Life	5/10
411Mania	5/10

The game received "generally unfavourable reviews" according to the review aggregation website Metacritic. In Japan, however, Famitsu gave it a score of all four sevens for a total of 28 out of 40.
