= Cradle of Rome =

2008 video game

- Developer: cerasus.media
- Publisher: D3 Publisher
- Platforms: Nintendo DS, Wii
- Release: Nintendo DS: EU: October 6, 2008; NA: November 18, 2008; Wii: EU: March 3, 2009; NA: March 31, 2009
- Genres: Puzzle, strategy
- Mode: Single-player

Cradle of Rome (released in some regions as Jewel Master: Cradle of Rome) is the first in a series of tile-matching puzzle and strategy video games developed by German studio cerasus.media and published by D3 Publisher on November 18, 2008 for the Nintendo DS handheld game console. The Wii version was released on March 31, 2009. The game has been brought to Steam since 2007.

The game was originally created for Windows by Awem studio from Belarus as a casual game. It has been followed by a variety of Cradle/Jewel Master games including Cradle of Athena, Cradle of Egypt and Cradle of Persia.

== Gameplay ==
The main screen of Cradle of Rome

The gameplay is similar to that of Bejeweled; the player must flip jewels/resources on a playing field to create matches of at least three items of the same type. As matches are formed, reserves of resources like grain and wood are collected and used towards building the Roman Empire. Between rounds, resources can be spent on farms, taverns and other buildings to cultivate the commonwealth. The goal of each round is to form matches on blue tiles to clear them from the screen. Obstacles increase the game's difficulty; they include locked gems/resources, which cannot be switched until a match is made to unlock them. Each round also has a time limit, which is represented by a slowly emptying vase of water on the top screen. To help the player, several power-ups can be acquired, such as a hammer that can destroy any tile on the field. The game progresses with new types of gems and resources being unlocked at every new building constructed in Rome. Some buildings provide an extra citizen who has in-game bonuses if the player is skillful with the particular resource unlocked from that building.

== Reception ==
Cradle of Rome was given a mixed reception by video game critics, and it received an aggregated score of 63% at Metacritic. IGN was disappointed with the game, noting that the game's manual did not adequately explain how the game worked. They also found that its electronic soundtrack did not fit the game's Roman theme. Their review gave the game a score of 5.9 of 10, and suggested that players purchase better alternatives such as The Quest Trio, stating, "It's another match-three game. There's nothing wrong with it, but it's been done better before." Game Informer gave it a 6.75 with the subheading "MORE LIKE CRADLE OF BORING" in issue 189 in January 2009.

== Rome Puzzle ==
Cradle of Rome was originally developed from an Awem Studios game by the name Rome Puzzle. This game was intended to be casual and many websites hosted and are currently offering it as 'play online for free' - Rome Puzzle version. The Rome Puzzle version was developed and revamped before being published as Cradle of Rome by D3.
