= NCAA Football 09 =

2008 college football video game

- Darren McFadden on the Xbox 360 cover of the game.
- Developers: EA Tiburon, EA Canada
- Publisher: EA Sports
- Platforms: Xbox 360, PlayStation 3, PlayStation Portable, PlayStation 2, Wii
- Release: July 15, 2008
- Genre: Sports
- Modes: Single-player; Multiplayer

NCAA Football 09 is a college football video game created by EA Sports, a subsidiary of Electronic Arts. It is the successor to NCAA Football 08 in the NCAA Football series. The game was announced on February 14, 2008 and was released on July 15, 2008 for the PlayStation 2, PlayStation 3, PlayStation Portable, Wii, and Xbox 360. The Wii version of the game is titled NCAA Football 09 All-Play and launched under EA Sports' new All-Play brand exclusive to the platform.

== New features ==
EA Tiburon made several additions and modifications to the game from previous editions.

- A new animation system has been put in place, whereby players are no longer locked into an animation. This allows players to chain together various moves, enabling a more fluid style of play.
- After throwing an interception, the player is allowed to answer a "Quarterback Quiz". The player is given several pictures – representing photos taken by the offensive coordinator – and is presented with three choices of defensive schemes to select. This new feature is solely for the controller/player to understand and read the defense.
- Quarterbacks playing on the road can be rattled by home crowds, forcing them to misread routes or completely forget plays. This effect is not amplified with an incorrect guess on the "Quarterback Quiz".
- Players can give coaching strategies, whereby the entire offense or defense will focus on a single action, such as forcing a turnover or ignoring the crowd noise.
- Players can call a timeout before a key field goal or extra point attempt to "ice" the kicker, which will overlay the kick meter with a sheet of ice, change the camera angle to a more dramatic view, cause the player's controller to shake violently, and give an audible heartbeat sound effect, which matches the pulse of the controller's rumble.
- There are new, school-specific celebrations, many of which involve the school's mascot.
- School-specific custom stadium sounds can be added from MP3s loaded on the gaming system's hard drive. Numerous user-created websites have popped up to facilitate this feature.
- The new "Coke Zero Mascot Mash Up" mode, where teams are made up entirely of the school's mascot. In this mode, ball-handling maneuvers are more fantasy-oriented, allowing the player to perform flips rather than typical jukes and spins.
- Mini-games allow for playing "H-O-R-S-E" with field goal kicks.
- Online Dynasty Mode with support for up to 12 players across Xbox Live or PlayStation Network.
- Ball trails and turbo trails for the Wii version.
- Freshman (PSP) and Family Play (PS2) modes simplify gameplay to single button presses, while also telling the novice player when to actually press the button to perform an action. The game will also suggest plays to run in specific situations.

== Cover ==
In order to promote its new Wii version of NCAA Football, EA held a competition from February 14, 2008 until March 14, 2008, allowing for fans to vote on their favorite NCAA Division I FBS college team mascot (with the University of Montana's Monte the lone FCS representative). The winner of the competition, Michigan State's mascot Sparty, is featured on the cover art for the Wii.

Each of the other four versions of the game features a different athlete on the cover. All were former collegiate players, as the use of an active student athlete was against NCAA regulations at the time:

- Former Arkansas running back Darren McFadden is the cover athlete for the Xbox 360.
- Former Boston College quarterback Matt Ryan is the cover athlete for the PS3.
- Former California wide receiver DeSean Jackson is the cover athlete for the PS2.
- Former West Virginia fullback Owen Schmitt is the cover athlete for the PSP.

== Demo ==
A contest was released June 19 at the Xbox Live Marketplace (Xbox 360) and PlayStation Store (PlayStation 3). The teams are Ohio State Buckeyes and the LSU Tigers and with 2 minute quarters at varsity level. A mascot game is also available with the Florida Gators versus the Texas Longhorns.

== Retired online play ==
On February 5, 2011, EA retired online play for several old games, including NCAA Football 09 for all platforms.

== Reception ==
Reception

Aggregate score
Aggregator	Score				
Aggregator	PS2	PS3	PSP	Wii	Xbox 360
Metacritic	N/A	81/100	N/A	49/100	83/100

Review scores
Publication	Score				
Publication	PS2	PS3	PSP	Wii	Xbox 360
GameSpot	N/A	N/A	N/A	N/A	7.5
IGN	7.0	8.4	6.5	5.0	8.4

The PlayStation 3 and Xbox 360 versions of NCAA Football 09 were generally well received by critics. Reviewers praised the addition of the new Online Dynasty mode and the improved animation system, which allowed for more fluid and realistic player movements. However, the Wii version, which was branded as NCAA Football 09 All-Play, received mixed to negative reactions. Critics faulted the Wii release for its stripped-down features, inferior graphics compared to the other consoles, and the implementation of the "All-Play" control scheme, which was criticized as being overly simplistic and alienating to traditional football gamers.
