= Deca Sports Extreme =

2011 video game

- PAL box cover art for Sports Island 3D
- Developer: Hudson Soft
- Publishers: JP: Hudson Soft; WW: Konami
- Series: Deca Sports
- Platform: Nintendo 3DS
- Release: JP: April 28, 2011; AU: June 2, 2011; EU: June 10, 2011; NA: September 13, 2011
- Genre: Sports
- Modes: Single-player, multiplayer

Deca Sports Extreme ^{JPN} ^{PAL} is a 2011 sports video game for the Nintendo 3DS developed by Hudson Soft and published by Konami in the Deca Sports series. The game is the third and final spin-off of the series, and, by extension, its sixth and final overall game.

== Reception ==
Reception

Aggregate score
Aggregator	Score
Metacritic	52/100

Review scores
Publication	Score
Famitsu	26/40
Gamekult	3/10
GamePro	3.5/5
GameSpot	3.5/10
Jeuxvideo.com	8/20
Nintendo Life	5/10
Nintendo Power	5/10
Nintendo World Report	6/10

Deca Sports Extreme received "mixed" reviews according to the review aggregation website Metacritic. Common points of criticism for the game included the controls being cumbersome and overly sensitive, teammate and opponent AI being either too dumb or too aggressive, and the camera not being able to track the action properly.

Marko Djordjević of GameSpot called the game out for feeling "sloppy" and how it "fails to bring anything interesting to the experience". Zach Kaplan of Nintendo Life praised the game's multiplayer mode but ultimately called it an "average and unmemorable compilation". In Japan, Famitsu gave it a score of one six, one seven, one six, and one seven for a total of 26 out of 40.

== Notes ==
Known in Japan as Deca Sporta 3D Sports (デカスポルタ 3Dスポーツ, Deka Suporuta 3D Supōtsu)
Known in the PAL region as Sports Island 3D
