= Fishing Master =

2007 video game

- North American box art
- Developer: Hudson Soft
- Publisher: Hudson Soft
- Series: Fishing Master (Series)
- Platform: Wii
- Release: JP: March 29, 2007; NA: September 18, 2007; EU: March 7, 2008; AU: March 21, 2008
- Genre: Fishing
- Modes: Single-player, multiplayer

Fishing Master (めざせ！！釣りマスター, Mezase!! Tsuri Master) is a fishing video game for the Nintendo's Wii console that was released on September 18, 2007 In this game the player uses the Wii Remote to fish. Most of the fish players can catch are real, but there are some fictional fish can be caught as the game progresses. Players can also buy upgrades of their pole and new kinds of bait. Its sequel Fishing Master World Tour was released on January 6, 2009, in North America. The game was ported to mobile phones in 2010, but it has since been taken down after Hudson Soft became fully bankrupt and was absorbed into Konami.

== Story ==
An old man, assumed to be the grandfather of the family, tells you that you have the potential to be a "Fishing Master". He has you catch fish in different regions in Japan until you are ready for a tournament, in the tournament you have to catch several of a specific fish and it needs to be bigger, longer, or heavier than the three other named computer characters.

== Release ==
The game was announced in July 2007.

In November 2007, Hudson Soft announced a distribution deal with Konami's European branch. The following month, it was revealed that Fishing Master and Sports Island would be the first two titles released under the new deal.
