= Prey the Stars =

2008 video game

- US box art
- Developer: Koei Canada
- Publisher: Koei
- Platform: Nintendo DS
- Release: JP: September 25, 2008; AU: October 9, 2008; EU: October 10, 2008; NA: October 13, 2008
- Genre: Action
- Modes: Single-player, multiplayer

Prey the Stars (known as Gabu★Gabu Planet (GABU★GABU プラネット, Gabu★Gabu Puranetto) in Japan and Prey the Stars: Gabu Gabu Planet in the PAL region) is a video game for the Nintendo DS from Koei.

== Gameplay ==
In the game, players control various dog-like creatures in a competition to eat the most items in a given level. In order to successfully eat an item, players must repeatedly press the B button to "chew" that item.

== Reception ==
Reception

Aggregate score
Aggregator	Score
Metacritic	66/100

Review scores
Publication	Score
1Up.com	B−
Eurogamer	5/10
Famitsu	28/40
GameZone	6.9/10
NGamer	72%
Nintendo Power	5.5/10
PopMatters	5/10

The game received "average" reviews according to the review aggregation website Metacritic. It was frequently compared to the Katamari series. In Japan, Famitsu gave it a score of one eight, two sevens, and one six for a total of 28 out of 40.
