= Deca Sports (video game) =

2008 video game

- European box art
- Developer: Hudson Soft
- Publisher: Hudson Soft
- Series: Deca Sports
- Platform: Wii
- Release: JP: March 19, 2008; NA: May 13, 2008; EU: June 6, 2008; AU: August 19, 2008; KOR: April 23, 2009
- Genre: Sports
- Modes: Single-player, multiplayer

Deca Sports (Deca Sporta in Japan and South Korea, Sports Island in Europe) is a sports video game for the Wii developed and published by Hudson Soft. It is a collection of ten different sports simulations controlled with the Wii Remote.

The game was released in Japan on March 19, 2008, April 23, 2009, in South Korea, and was released in the rest of the world later in 2008. In late 2007, Hudson conducted a poll to determine a new title for the Western release. The game features sponsorship by Adidas.

== Gameplay ==
Deca Sports features several different game modes:

- Open Match: A quick start match that allows the player to immediately jump into any of the 10 available sports events.
- Tournament Mode: Tackling one individual event to become the champion in that particular sport.
- Deca League: Taking on a number of different teams at every sport available in the game.
- Deca Challenge: Players test themselves at each sport in specialized events designed to hone their skill and control.

Deca Sports does not feature the use of Miis. Instead, eight different teams (Average Joes, Speed Strikers, Hard Hitters, Crusaders, Boost Force, Mad Maidens, Team Thunder, and Disco Knights) are available for selection in the various sporting events. Each team is made up of small, medium, and large players of both sexes. Small athletes are nimble, but are not strong, while large athletes are powerful, but are slower and more difficult to control. Medium-size players provide a compromise between speed and strength. Team member size becomes more consequential during the Deca League, where playing one team member for too long will result in fatigue and decreased performance.

There are 10 different sports listed, each of which has its own control scheme specific to the Wii Remote. For Beach Volleyball, the game controls the movement of the player and the teammates as the player pulls the Wii Remote to return and pass the ball to the opponent's side of the court. Different variations of serves and volleys can be performed. In Figure Skating, the player uses the Nunchuk's analog stick to skate along three different predetermined routines which are tied to music. While navigating the skater along a line with yellow dots, large circles that differ in color type will appear. Once they enter those circles, shaking the Wii Remote will execute the maneuvers.

- Archery: The player holds down the B Button on the Wii Remote and pulls it back to draw the arrow, then aims with the pointer. The player must release the B Button within ten seconds to launch the arrow at the target.
- Badminton: The Wii Remote is used as a racquet in this sport. The player must swing the Wii Remote with good timing to return the shuttle to the opponent, and can also control which way the shuttle goes by moving the Wii Remote left or right after a downward swing.
- Basketball: The player uses the Nunchuk's analog stick to move a character, while using buttons to pass to or control teammates and Wii Remote gestures to shoot or steal.
- Curling: The player holds down the B Button, which causes a power meter to increase and decrease. The player then flicks the Wii Remote right at the moment the desired power level is reached to launch a stone down the ice. If the stone needs to coast further, the player shakes the Wii Remote to sweep the ice in front of the stone.
- Figure skating
- Football (soccer): The player uses the Nunchuk's analog stick to move a character, buttons to pass to or control teammates and Wii Remote gestures to pass and shoot.
- Kart racing: The player holds the Wii Remote sideways as if it were a steering wheel and tilts it to steer while using the number buttons as pedals.
- Snowboard cross: The player points the Wii Remote at the lower part of the screen to accelerate down the slopes, while twisting it left or right to steer.
- Supercross: Controls are similar to that of go-kart racing, but the player can also shake the Wii Remote to execute tricks or roll it backward or forwards to make a good landing after a jump.

== Development and release ==
The game was initially revealed at TGS 2007 under the title of Deca Sporta, with a planned December release date in Japan. A representative for Hudson claimed that the studio didn't anticipate high review scores, noting the simplicity and graphics quality as "typical complaints of Wii games".

In November 2007, Hudson signed a distribution deal with Konami's European branch. The following month, it was revealed that Deca Sporta, renamed to Sports Island, alongside Fishing Master would be the first two titles released under the new deal.

In January 2008, Hudson's US publishing branch, Hudson Entertainment, announced that the game would be localised and released in North America as Deca Sports. In April, the game went gold with an announced release date of May 13 for North America. Mike Samachisa, the head of Hudson's console team, mentioned that localizing Deca Sports for the English version made sense, as the sports contained are played around the world. The idea was to combine sports events from Summer Olympic Games, Winter Olympic Games, and X Games, creating a compilation game that would have a wide appeal. Every mode is unlocked within the game right from the beginning as everything was designed to be accessible.

Adidas signed a partnership with Hudson, allowing its logo to appear in-game.

== Reception ==
Reception

Aggregate score
Aggregator	Score
Metacritic	50/100

Review scores
Publication	Score
1Up.com	D+
GamePro	3.5/5
GameSpot	3.5/10
GameTrailers	5.8/10
IGN	4.5/10
Jeuxvideo.com	7/20
Nintendo Life	4/10
Nintendo World Report	6/10

Deca Sports received mixed-to-negative reviews. On Metacritic, which uses a weighted average of different reviews to determine a score, it has a score of 50/100. GameSpot gave Deca Sports a 3.5/10. IGN gave it a 4.5/10. 1UP gave it a D+.

In spite of the poor critical reception, the game has reportedly sold well. Hudson Soft, the publisher of the game, announced it sold 2 million units of Deca Sports since its launch. Deca Sports was nominated for "Worst Game Everyone Played" by GameSpot in its 2008 video game awards.

== Future ==
A sequel, Deca Sports 2, was released the following year, eventually turning the game into a trilogy and also spawning three spin-offs on other systems.
