= Iron Chef America: Supreme Cuisine =

2008 video game

- Cover for the Wii version.
- Developer: Black Lantern Studios
- Publisher: Destineer
- Platforms: Nintendo DS, Wii
- Release: Nintendo DS: NA: November 18, 2008; Wii: NA: November 25, 2008
- Genres: Cooking simulation, Minigames
- Modes: Single-player, multiplayer

Iron Chef America: Supreme Cuisine is a video game released for Nintendo DS on November 18, 2008, and for the Wii one week later. It is based on the television series Iron Chef America and developed by American studio Black Lantern Studios, published by Destineer.

== Overview ==
Resembling other cooking games such as Cooking Mama, Supreme Cuisine features "a series of fast-paced and intense culinary challenges" in which players either use the Wii Remote or the stylus on the DS to prepare dishes while competing against an opponent. Much like the show, players must complete between three and six dishes within a time limit, which are then judged by taste, visual appeal, and originality.

The game features a chef school for the player to practice their skills in preparing dishes, a career mode in which players progress through a number of challengers before taking on the Iron Chefs, and an instant action quick play mode. The DS version features wireless multiplayer and a single-console "Pass Play" turn-based multiplayer mode.

The game features the voice acting and likeness of Chairman Mark Dacascos, commentator Alton Brown and Iron Chefs Mario Batali, Masaharu Morimoto and Cat Cora, whom players can either play as or compete against.

== Reception ==
Reception

Aggregate scores
Aggregator	Score
GameRankings	(DS) 58.33% (Wii) 44.50%
Metacritic	(DS) 58/100 (Wii) 42/100

Review scores
Publication	Score
Game Informer	4.5/10
GameSpot	2/10
IGN	(DS) 6.8/10 (Wii) 4.5/10

The DS version of the game has received average to mixed scores, with Metacritic's median review score of 58 out of 100, and GameRankings' score of 58.33%

The Wii version of the game, however, has received mediocre to slightly unfavorable reviews, as GameRankings gave it a score of 44.50%, while Metacritic gave it a score of 42 out of 100.
