= Summon Night: Twin Age =

2007 video game

- North American cover art
- Developer: Flight-Plan
- Publishers: JP: Banpresto; NA: Atlus
- Directors: Takayuki Kinoshita; Hirokazu Kawase
- Designer: Akira Yamamoto
- Artists: Tobe Sonaho; Shinichiro Otsuka
- Writer: Midori Tateyama
- Series: Summon Night
- Platform: Nintendo DS
- Release: JP: August 30, 2007; NA: June 3, 2008
- Genre: Action role-playing
- Mode: Single-player

Summon Night: Twin Age (Note: Known in Japan as Summon Night Twin Age Seirei-tachi no Kyōmei (Koe) (Japanese: サモンナイト ツインエイジ 精霊(せいれい)たちの共鳴(こえ), Hepburn: Samon Naito Tsuin'eiji Seirei-tachi no Kyōmei (Koe))) is an action role-playing game in the Summon Night series for the Nintendo DS. Summon Night uses a party based system of three characters at a time and a fully touch-based control system. The game was developed by Flight-Plan and published by Atlus. It was released in Japan on August 30, 2007 and in North America on June 3, 2008.

== Gameplay ==
Summon Night: Twin Age uses a fully touch-based control system. Gameplay in Summon Night is based on a top-down, hack and slash, RPG similar to Diablo II or Ragnarok Online. Moving the main character is done by tapping the screen where the player wishes it to move. Attacking is done by tapping a target enemy onscreen with the stylus. The controlled character will then attack periodically until given a different command. Skills, spells, and items are used through two pop-up windows along the sides of the screen where the player can preset abilities. They are used by tapping the desired ability and then a target. Summon Night uses a party based system of three characters at a time. Two will always be the main characters and one will be a third A.I. controlled party member of the player's choice. Control between the heroes can be done at any time they are on the same screen. Summoned creatures can also be used in battle by defeating the respective monster, obtaining its creation item, and then conjuring it into a flask through a menu on the world map. These flasks can be used as items to summon monsters for the player's team.

Other than the controlled main character, other party members, be they humanoid or monster, will act independently, attacking and using skills, but will follow the main character's movement. Continued use of a certain party member will increase that character's "rank" improving its performance and granting access to new skills. The two main characters both gain experience from defeating enemies, gaining levels in the process, while the third party member shares a level with the "chosen" main character. Leveling up increases a character's parameters and grants the two main characters access to skill points they can spend on their skill tree to unlock/upgrade their skills. All skills have a maximum level of seven and have both a level requirement, and a skill point requirement, to unlock.

== Plot ==
The world in which Summon Night: Twin Age takes place is called Clardona. In this world there are two main races; humans, and the Kascuza, creatures which have both human and beast-like features. The two races are constantly battling, and a short-lived peace began after the humans pushed the Kascuza onto a small island called Jarazi. A third group that inhabits Clardona are spirits, entities from another world, which mainly manifest in the form of nature spirits, and rarely as creatures or humanoids known as Summon Beasts. Humans can call up creatures from another world in a process known as "Summoning" and they are constantly researching ways to increase their summoning powers. In one of the facilities, a terrible accident happened caused by a young girl named Reiha's summoning powers getting out of control. The girl was assumed to have died along with her family in the accident, but she survived, and was hidden with the Kascuza on the island of Jarazi, along with the result of the summoning, a young Summon Beast boy named Aldo. Seven years passed. Near their coming of age ceremony the spirits of nature suddenly began to go wild, and the two of them leave to discover the reason for the strange events, which is also an under kingdom.

== Characters ==
These are the main characters of the game. The story is different depending on the character the player chooses at the beginning, but they are both controlled in combat:

Reiha is a young, human girl raised among Kascuza. She is cheerful and responsible, and likes gardening and cooking. In battle Reiha uses projectile attacks, and is able to cast sky/wind/earth/water/fire Spirit magic, curative magic, and buff/debuff magic. She has high magic power and SP but low attack and hit points.

Aldo is the other main character in the game. He is a Summon Beast, brought into this world when Reiha lost control of her powers seven years ago. He loves Reiha's cooking, and listening to the wind. Aldo uses physical attacks in battle, as well as sword/axe/spear/fist skills, and buff magic. He has high attack power and hit points but is weak magically. He is a brave person and stands up for others in need.

== Reception ==
Reception

Aggregate score
Aggregator	Score
Metacritic	73/100

Review scores
Publication	Score
1Up.com	C
Famitsu	33/40
Game Informer	7/10
GameSpot	7/10
GamesRadar+	3.5/5
GameZone	8.3/10
IGN	8.2/10
Nintendo Power	7.5/10
Nintendo World Report	8/10

The game received "average" reviews according to the review aggregation website Metacritic. In Japan, Famitsu gave it a score of one nine and three eights for a total of 33 out of 40.

GameSpot praised the "simple, but charming gameplay and the cute presentation", but stated that "there are a few AI and targeting issues", and that "exploration can get monotonous". IGN praised the game's "beautiful art, strong effect, deep customization aspects, and a slick overall interface". IGN also stated that "while the touch control is simple, it is varied with spells, skills, and attacks", and that "the monster battle system, skill trees, item creation/upgrading, and general flow of the game are all well designed"; and "while the soundtrack is simple, it is effective". GamePro said that the game was "suitably cute and colorful, more or less what you'd expect from a Japanese RPG. The character sprites and magic spells are shiny and well-animated." (Note: GamePro gave the game two 4/5 scores for graphics and control, and two 3.5/5 scores for sound and fun factor.)
