= Journey to the Center of the Earth (2008 video game) =

2008 video game

- North American cover art
- Developer: Human Soft
- Publisher: THQ
- Platform: Nintendo DS
- Release: EU: June 27, 2008; NA: June 30, 2008; AU: September 11, 2008
- Genre: Action
- Mode: Single-player

Journey to the Center of the Earth is an action game for the Nintendo DS based on the 2008 film of the same name, and was developed by Hungarian studio Human Soft and published by THQ.

The game allowed players to play as the three main characters of the movie: Trevor, Sean and Hannah.

== Gameplay ==
Trevor navigating through the center of the Earth

The gameplay of the game is based solely on the events of the movie in an open world environment, allowing the player to control out-of-control minecarts and rafts throughout the center of the Earth. THQ also expanded the environment of the center of the Earth to allow the player to further journey throughout the open environment. The game also features three playable characters: Trevor, Sean and Hannah, who each have a special ability. Progress in the game is based on the use of checkpoints. Each time a character dies, they return to the last checkpoint and continue from there. Journey to the Center of the Earth allows the player to control movements with the bottom screen while the character reacts on the upper screen. IGN said this about the game: "Horrible controls make the game an endless pattern of accidentally jumping into bottomless pits."

== Reception ==
Reception

Review score
Publication	Score
IGN	3.5 / 10

IGN simply noted that "it's freaking terrible, and there's not even a console version to go play instead." IGN mainly criticized the game because there was only a version to play for the Nintendo DS and not on another platform. IGN also criticized the recordings of the game, saying that "the voice acting and sound effects for Center of the Earth are so horrendously bad that they literally made me LOL."
