= Naruto: Ninja Destiny =

2006 video game

- Developer: DreamFactory
- Publishers: JP: Takara Tomy; NA/EU: Tomy
- Series: Naruto: Ninja Destiny
- Platform: Nintendo DS
- Release: JP: December 14, 2006; EU: February 15, 2008; NA: February 26, 2008; AU: March 20, 2008
- Genre: Fighting game
- Modes: Single-player, multiplayer

Naruto: Ninja Destiny, known in Japan as Naruto: Shinobi Retsuden (NARUTO(ナルト) 忍列伝; lit. 'Naruto: Shinobi Legend'), is a fighting game developed by DreamFactory for Nintendo DS in 2006–2008. It is the first game in the Naruto: Ninja Destiny series.

The North American and European versions have a different story. The original story from the Japanese version (with a new storyline added) was published in Europe as its own version of Ninja Destiny 2. The game features 16 playable characters (including 3 extra characters for North American and European versions).

== Reception ==
Reception

Aggregate score
Aggregator	Score
Metacritic	61/100

Review scores
Publication	Score
1Up.com	D
Famitsu	25/40
GameRevolution	D−
GameSpot	5/10
GameSpy	3/5
GamesRadar+	3.5/5
GameTrailers	6.2/10
GameZone	7.9/10
IGN	7.2/10
Nintendo Power	7/10
Nintendo World Report	8/10

The game received "mixed" reviews according to the review aggregation website Metacritic. In Japan, Famitsu gave it a score of one seven and three sixes for a total of 25 out of 40. GamePro said, "Hardcore Naruto fans who are subject to long road trips will manage to squeeze a few hours of fun out of Ninja Destiny. All others should apply their stealthy skills elsewhere in gaming's vast stable of ninja titles." (Note: GamePro gave the game 4/5 for graphics, 2.5/5 for sound, and two 3/5 scores for control and fun factor.)
