= Elefunk =

2008 video game

- Developers: 8bit Games, Big Head Games
- Publisher: Sony Computer Entertainment
- Platform: PlayStation 3
- Release: JP: 10 July 2008; WW: 17 July 2008
- Genre: Puzzle
- Modes: Single-player, multiplayer

Elefunk is a 2008 puzzle video game developed by British studios 8bit Games and Big Head Games and published by Sony Computer Entertainment for the PlayStation 3. It was released on the PlayStation Network. It is a physics-based puzzle game like Bridge Constructor but much more elaborate and not limited to bridges.

== Gameplay ==
Elefunk is a puzzle game, where players build bridges from various joints and slants. Resilience is tested with elephants; the bridges are built to prevent them from falling. The game has 20+ levels, various construction materials, different environments, multiplayer and online leaderboards.

There are 4 stages in the game; Waterfall, Desert (which consists of the elephants rolling down making the levels more difficult), Swamp (which consists of ropes and wooden pieces) and Circus, the final stage. At the end of each stage there is a bonus level where players control a ramp and try to reach a target.

== Reception ==
Reception

Aggregate scores
Aggregator	Score
GameRankings	70.62%
Metacritic	70/100

Review scores
Publication	Score
Eurogamer	7/10
GameSpot	7/10
IGN	7/10

Elefunk received mixed reviews from critics upon release. On Metacritic, the game holds a score of 70/100 based on 14 reviews, indicating "mixed or average reviews". On GameRankings, the game holds a score of 70.62% based on 13 reviews.
