= Deadliest Catch: Alaskan Storm =

2008 video game

- Xbox 360 box art (US)
- Developer(s): Liquid Dragon Studios
- Publisher(s): Greenwave Games
- Platform(s): Xbox 360, Microsoft Windows
- Release: Xbox 360: NA: June 17, 2008; Microsoft Windows: NA: August 19, 2008
- Genre(s): Business simulation game, Strategy video game
- Mode(s): Single-player, Multiplayer

Deadliest Catch: Alaskan Storm is a 2008 simulation computer game for the Xbox 360 and Microsoft Windows developed by American company Liquid Dragon Studios and published by Greenwave Games. The game was created by Northwestern Games.

== Overview ==
Alaskan Storm is a game based on the television show Deadliest Catch. The game takes place in the Bering Sea. The player plan must manage navigation, maintenance of their boat, the hiring of crew members, and control their fishing. The game itself features the F/V Northwestern, F/V Cornelia Marie, and F/V Sea Star as crab boats that can be chosen by the player, along with the Bering Star and the Shellfish.

== Reception ==
Deadliest Catch: Alaskan Storm has received mixed reviews, including a passable 6.4 rating from IGN, a poor 4.0 score from GameSpot, and a 56 out of 100 score on Metacritic.
