= Hockey Allstar Shootout =

2008 video game

- Developer(s): Big Blue Bubble
- Publisher(s): Big Blue Bubble
- Platform(s): Wii (WiiWare)
- Release: NA: December 8, 2008
- Genre(s): Sports
- Mode(s): Single-player, Multiplayer

Hockey Allstar Shootout is a WiiWare game developed and produced by Big Blue Bubble.

== Gameplay ==
The game uses the motion sensing capabilities of the Wii Remote to allow the player to use it as a control stick and to hit the puck, with the Nunchuk used to set its shooting direction. The Game feature four modes: Head 2 Head, Two-Player Mode, Shap Shooter and Power Shot.

In Head 2 Head mode the player is pitted against the goalie in a five-puck shootout. The player has to race against the clock to post the most goals in the fastest time. Head 2 Head includes three different difficulties and 3 different goalies. Two-Player Mode includes support for two Remotes, with players taking turns at being the goalie and the shot taker to see who can score the most goals after five tries. In Sharp Shooter mode players have to hit targets in three different difficulty levels. The game ends when the player has failed to hit a target three times. In Power Shot mode players have three attempts to hit the fastest shots they can and make the high score table.

== Reception ==
Nintendo Life gave the game 1 out of 10, noting the game featured "barely functioning controls, cheesy gameplay and an unrewarding experience that all add up to an inexcusable attempt to cash in on an apparently untapped market." They also warned hockey fans that they should spend their 500 wii points on Blades of steel and the ice hockey game for the NES system then on this one.
