= Shred Nebula =

2008 video game

- Developer: CrunchTime Games
- Publisher: CrunchTime Games
- Designers: James Goddard; David Winstead
- Platform: Xbox 360
- Release: September 3, 2008
- Genre: Multidirectional shooter
- Modes: Single-player, multiplayer

Shred Nebula is a multidirectional shooter developed by American studio CrunchTime Games for the Xbox 360 via Xbox Live Arcade service. The game was released on September 3, 2008.

== Gameplay ==
Gameplay screenshot

Shred Nebula takes its inspiration from Asteroids and SubSpace. It is a top down shooter in which the player can only shoot in the direction the ship is facing. The game features over 20 ships, each with its own unique speed, durability, and special attacks. In multiplayer, players can choose from a selection of 8 different ships. There are 40 stages in total, each of which will feature unique obstacles or traps. The game features three modes: a single-player campaign with over 20 levels, a score attack mode, and a multiplayer mode that supports up to eight players online and up to two offline.

== Development ==
On July 9, 2008, CrunchTime Games announced that development was finished. In August, the developer announced the game's release for September 3, 2008. Crunchtime Games publicly released the game's design documents in September to aid games designers. Crunchtime gave an interview the same month.

== Reception ==
Reception

Aggregate scores
Aggregator	Score
GameRankings	65.20%
Metacritic	66/100

Review scores
Publication	Score
Eurogamer	7/10
GamePro	3.25/5
GameSpot	6.5/10
IGN	7/10
TeamXbox	7.8/10
Gameplanet	5/10

Shred Nebula received mixed reviews from critics upon release. On Metacritic, the game holds a score of 66/100 based on 16 reviews, indicating "mixed or average reviews". On GameRankings, the game holds a score of 65.20% based on 15 reviews.
