= SPOGS Racing =

2008 video game

- Developer: Pronto Games
- Publisher: D2CspoG
- Platform: Wii (WiiWare)
- Release: NA: July 7, 2008; EU: July 18, 2008
- Genre: Racing
- Modes: Single-player, Multiplayer

SPOGS Racing was a racing video game published by D2C Games and developed by American studio Pronto Games for the Wii. It was released as a WiiWare title in North America on July 7, 2008, and in Europe on July 18, 2008.

As the WiiWare service was discontinued in 2019, the game can no longer be purchased.

== Gameplay ==
The game sees the player racing around twelve tracks in a vehicle called a SPOG (Sports Player Object Gyros), which resembles a tire with a Pog-like disc inside representing the player's avatar. Adding to the traditional racing game formula, SPOGS Racing gives the player an ability, called Crash 'N Grab, to steal spare parts such as engines, brakes, and tailpipes from their opponents to upgrade their own vehicle by crashing into them. The SPOGS themselves are equipped with six different weapons to allow the player to slow down the opponents and take their parts more easily, and are maneuverable enough to allow players to pull off tricks on ramps and loops and make the vehicle spin off, drift and flip over.

In addition to three different control schemes, SPOGS Racing also features several different available modes: quick races, a battle mode and a season mode (which sees the player racing on all the available tracks). D2C Games CEO Scott Orr has also revealed plans for downloadable content for the game. An example of such content will be downloadable "racer packs" that will include content such as new tracks, vehicles and other related material.

SPOGS Racing was inspired by other racing games such as Andretti Racing, Hard Drivin', Mario Kart and Crash Team Racing.

== Reception ==
SPOGS Racing garnered an overwhelmingly negative response from critics. It received an "abysmal" 1.9 out of a possible 10 from IGN, who called the game "WiiShovelWare", citing dull gameplay, infuriating AI and claiming it to be the "ugliest game available on the Wii". They also pointed out the absurdity of such a "broken, fugly" game standing among the likes of other WiiWare titles such as LostWinds and Final Fantasy Crystal Chronicles: My Life as a King. However, they did believe the Crash 'N Grab mechanic was the sole good idea in the game, though it was poorly implemented. Hardcore Gamer also gave the game a negative response, scoring it a 1 out of 5 and claiming it to be "one of the most horrible games ever made". They also called the graphics "insulting" and said the game's music will "make you leave the game feeling like you’ve just been punched in the head a few times". Eurogamer's reviewer called it "the most inept game [they've] played on any format, in any genre, in recent memory", giving it a 1 out of 10.

WiiWare World was only slightly more positive with a 3/10, calling the gameplay and opponent AI "terribly erratic" and the graphics "absolutely inexcusable". However they felt the game had some unique ideas, and that the two player mode was decent, but still "not that great". Their sole praise was for the sound effects, which they felt sounded "very authentic".

With a Metascore of 18 from 7 reviews, Metacritic proclaimed SPOGS Racing to be its Wii "Dud of the Year". The title is the lowest-rated Wii game on the site.
