= Bliss Island =

2006 video game

- European cover art
- Developer: PomPom Games
- Publisher: Codemasters
- Platforms: Windows, PlayStation Portable, Xbox 360
- Release: Windows: EU: May 30, 2006; PlayStation Portable: EU: December 8, 2006; AU: January 26, 2007; Xbox 360: NA: March 12, 2008; EU: March 12, 2008
- Genre: Puzzle
- Mode: Single-player

Bliss Island is a puzzle video game developed by PomPom Games and published by Codemasters for Microsoft Windows and PlayStation Portable. An Xbox Live Arcade version was released on March 12, 2008.

== Gameplay ==
Bliss Island is mainly played using an analog stick and an action button. Most of the modes involve making one of the colorful characters reach A to B, destroying a certain enemy or making an item move into a certain place.

== Reception ==
Reception

Aggregate scores
Aggregator	Score
GameRankings	PC: 69.50% PSP: 47.50% X360: 41.15%
Metacritic	X360: 43/100

Review scores
Publication	Score
Eurogamer	5/10
GamePro	4.5/5
GameSpot	3.5/10
IGN	3.5/10
TeamXbox	3/10
VideoGamer.com	4/10
Pocket Gamer	5/10

Bliss Island received mixed to negative reviews from critics upon release, with the Xbox 360 version getting the most negative reviews compared to the other versions of the game. On Metacritic, the Xbox 360 version of the game holds a score of 43/100 based on 12 reviews, indicating "generally unfavorable reviews". On GameRankings, the game holds scores of 69.50% for the PC version based on two reviews, 47.50% for the PSP version based on eight reviews, and 41.15% for the Xbox 360 version based on 13 reviews.
