= MLB Stickball =

2008 video game

- Developer: Gaia Industries
- Publisher: 2K
- Platform: Xbox 360 (XBLA)
- Release: NA: October 8, 2008
- Genre: Sports
- Modes: Single-player, multiplayer

MLB Stickball was a Major League Baseball-licensed stickball video game published by 2K for the Xbox 360 via Xbox Live Arcade. It was released on October 8, 2008, and removed from the Xbox Live Marketplace in December 2014.

== Gameplay ==
Gameplay screenshot.

In the game, players buy and collect packs of Topps "Big Head" Major League Baseball (MLB) cards, which unlock players. Each team has four different unlockable players, usually the bigger names. In the "Tour" mode, which has the player going around to different cities to play different teams, the player starts with one MLB player if the player is a first time user. Usually it is a player that easily represents the team, such as Prince Fielder for the Brewers or David Ortiz for the Red Sox. The Tour gets progressively harder as the player continues. Gameplay recreates the atmosphere of street stickball based in various cities such as Brooklyn, San Francisco and Boston.

The game makes use of the environment, as objects on the field represent benefits and hazards. For instance, striking a fire hydrant with a batted ball will cause it to spray water onto the street for a bonus. Breaking a window turns a potential extra base hit into an out. Certain special items that are identified in the achievements are worth even extra, such as hitting the "wheel" or "basketball hoop". Hitting these are worth 20 gamer points, and require a good amount of luck rather than skill. These extra points can also be obtained by hitting cars, scooters, and cows (on the bounce). Later these points can be used to purchase more Topps cards. A pack of three random cards costs 50 points.

Before each game, the player chooses four players for their team. These players have to be a real part of the team. If the player has not unlocked all the characters on the team they have selected, they can use anonymous characters, skilled in specific areas.

When pitching the player can choose one of four pitches based on the four color buttons on the controller. These choices are a lob pitch, a fastball, a curveball, or a bouncing pitch. Each has its own uses, and the pitches are best when mixed and matched. After choosing a pitch and location, a meter appears in which the player must hold the button down for a certain amount of time in order to help guarantee the perfection of the pitch. The higher "green" (towards the top) of the meter that the player gets, the more likely the pitch will behave as desired. Power pitchers and accuracy based pitchers are more likely to have the ball go in the desired spot, but players like the power hitters can strike the computer out in the lower levels of Tour mode as long as they use the meter well. This is crucial because there are few ways to get an out in the game, and the most helpful to the player is a strikeout due to the five points received for its completion.

When batting, a player can only hit a ball that is located in the strike zone. The player may move the playable character back and forth in the batter's box. The player presses "A" with good timing to hit the pitch. If the player presses "B" instead, the batter is more likely to hit a home run, but also more likely to pop out. The characters baserun themselves and take only the minimum number of bases. For example, if there is a man on first and the character hits a double, the man on first would have advanced to third. Home runs are worth extra points, and a grand slam unlocks an achievement.

Before pitching the player also has the choice of moving fielding players around with the use of the right bumper. Many times the player can choose such things as left, right, deep, shallow, or normal. This will often be based on the stats shown in the bottom right of the opposing hitter - a hitter that is a pitcher will most likely have bad hitting stats, allowing the opponent to play shallow and get the out from the groundout more readily.

The player plays six innings per game in tour mode, though in exhibition the player can choose either three, six, or nine inning games. If the player is winning going into the bottom of the 6th, or the bottom of the last inning, the last half of the inning is not played, similar to MLB. If a team wins, its characters celebrate around home plate; if they lose, they look discouraged around the pitcher's area. After a game the player is presented stats of the characters used, including strikeouts, RBIs, hits, and ERA.

== Achievements ==
After playing for the first time the player can look at the achievements at any point during gameplay simply by pressing start during a game or on the main title screen of the game. Some of the achievements require skill such as hitting for the cycle, while others require a certain amount of luck, such as hitting the basketball hoop. There are 12 possible achievements worth a total of 200 possible points.

== Card collecting ==
Collecting points gives the player the opportunity to purchase a pack of cards for 50 points. Each pack contains three random cards out of a total of 120. Getting all 120 unlocks an achievement for the player. Three duplicate cards of the same player can be traded in for any card the player desires. A set of five duplicate cards of the same player can be upgraded to a gold card, slightly boosting the player's stats. It is possible to get four different players per team, and they are usually the most famous, or the most representative of the team, such as Derek Jeter, Albert Pujols, Ichiro or Josh Hamilton. Getting all four cards of a team also unlocks an achievement for the player.

== Reception ==
Reception

Aggregate score
| Aggregator | Score |
|---|---|
| Metacritic | 46/100 |

Review scores
| Publication | Score |
|---|---|
| GamePro | 2.5/5 |
| GameSpot | 4.5/10 |
| IGN | 3/10 |
| Official Xbox Magazine (US) | 6/10 |
| TeamXbox | 8.5/10 |

The game received "generally unfavorable reviews" according to the review aggregation website Metacritic, even though fans felt the game was one of the greatest. Fans also are hoping for a comeback of some sort with this type of backyard gameplay fun.

== See also ==
- MLB Power Pros
