= The Legend of Kage 2 =

2008 video game

- Developer: Lancarse
- Publishers: JP: Taito; NA/EU: Square Enix; AU: Ubisoft
- Platform: Nintendo DS
- Release: JP: March 13, 2008; NA: October 7, 2008; EU: November 7, 2008; AU: November 13, 2008
- Genres: Platform, action

The Legend of Kage 2 (影之伝説 -THE LEGEND OF KAGE 2-, Kage no Densetsu -THE LEGEND OF KAGE 2-) is a Japanese action-adventure game developed by Lancarse for the Nintendo DS, and published by Taito in 2008. Taito's parent company, Square Enix, published a North American localization of the game later that year. The Legend of Kage 2 is the sequel to The Legend of Kage (1985), an arcade game developed and distributed by Taito.

== Plot ==
The player takes control of: either Kage, the ninja from the first game (armed with a katana and shuriken); or Chihiro, a kunoichi from Iga raised by Hanzo Hattori (armed with a kusarigama). Both are loyal to the shogun Ieyasu Tokugawa. Their mission is to rescue Tokugawa's daughter, Princess Kirihime; she has been kidnapped by the demonic warlord Yoshiro Kuyigusa and his aide-de-camp, the rogue samurai Yukinosuke Riko, in an attempt to overthrow the Tokugawa shogunate.

== Gameplay ==
Kage and Chihiro each have a personal story and 17 different ninjutsu techniques to master. They have skills such as abilities to climb vertical cliffs, hanging from ceilings, and blocking enemy attacks with the sword (which could also be done in the original game). The game introduces ninpo skills such as Bunshin no Jutsu, a technique that creates deadly duplicates of the player. Mastering ninjutsu enables players to launch powerful elemental attacks and summon monsters.

== Reception ==
Reception

Aggregate score
Aggregator	Score
Metacritic	70/100

Review scores
Publication	Score
1Up.com	B−
Famitsu	29/40
GamePro	3.5/5
GameSpot	7.5/10
GamesRadar+	4/5
GameZone	8/10
IGN	5.8/10
Nintendo Power	8/10
Nintendo World Report	7/10
PALGN	5/10
411Mania	6/10

The Legend of Kage 2 received "average" reviews according to the review aggregation website Metacritic. In Japan, Famitsu gave it a score of two sevens, one eight, and one seven for a total of 29 out of 40.

The game was noted for its difficulty, which was reported to rise considerably after the first level. The game was also praised for the well-designed boss fights, and crisp, vivid art, but was also criticized for the lack of detail in the environments. The controls were reported to have minor problems such as being unable to jump immediately after an attack. The story was also criticized for straying from the original source material, as well as its lack of voiceovers and repetitive level layouts.
