= Go! Go! Break Steady =

2008 video game

- Developer: Little Boy Games
- Publisher: Microsoft Game Studios
- Platform: Xbox 360
- Release: July 23, 2008
- Genre: Puzzle game
- Modes: Single-player, multiplayer

Go! Go! Break Steady is a breakdancing-themed puzzle game developed by Little Boy Games and published by Microsoft Game Studios for Xbox 360 via Xbox Live Arcade. The game was released on July 23, 2008.

== Gameplay ==
Gameplay screenshot.

The game is a timed-button rhythm game similar to Boom Boom Rocket with elements of Zuma. A sequence of button icons rolls from various angles towards a target circle, and the player must hit those buttons when they enter the circle to earn "Beatniks"; the better the timing, the more Beatniks earned to shoot. Missing a beat or making the wrong button press fills the penalty bar.

The player then uses the Beatniks to eliminate the string of Beatniks arranged in an arc. The player must shoot each colored Beatnik into a string of like-colored Beatniks to eliminate them for points; the arc collapses in the same way as Zuma. An especially long combination "saves" the player by wiping the penalty bar.

The round ends when the song ends. If the penalty bar fills before the song is over, the song ends before the player eliminates the Beatniks, or the Beatnik arc gets too long, the player fails the round.

The game features 20 licensed songs which fall into the hip-hop, disco, funk and electro categories.

== Multiplayer ==
The game features two player off- and online co-op and versus modes.

The versus mode involves a head-to-head match with another opponent. New power-ups appear in the beatnik circles in versus mode that allow the player to attack the opponent. To activate the power-up, the power-up beatnik has to be knocked out of your own circle. Power-ups include a "hammer" power-up that adds five beatniks to the opponent's puzzle and a spray paint power-up that covers the opponent's target circle with paint making it hard for them to enter inputs with the music.

In co-op mode, players play the rhythm portion together with the worst of the two inputs determining the number of earned beatniks for shooting. The players then take turns solving the beatnik puzzle.

== Reception ==
Reception

Aggregate scores
Aggregator	Score
GameRankings	73%
Metacritic	68/100

Review scores
Publication	Score
1Up.com	B+
GamePro	8/10
IGN	8.4/10

Go! Go! Break Steady has received generally "mixed or average" reviews, with reviewers generally noting its unique gameplay. 1UP.com awarded Go! Go! Break Steady a rating of 8.3/10 stating, "Go! Go! Break Steady is an unexpected visual delight (especially for HDTV owners) -- and it makes an already strong multigenre affair even better." IGN gave the game a rating of 7.3, stating "Go! Go! Break Steady is a fun experiment in merging two genres that would seem to have nothing in common." GamePro awarded the game a rating of 8/10, saying, "Stylized graphics, smooth 2D character animations and a slick presentation make Go! Go! Break Steady an experience not quite like anything else out there."

== Development ==
Go! Go! Break Steady is the first and sole game developed by Little Boy Games, an independent game development studio founded by Ivan Tung and Ahmed Usman Khalid. The company is located in Vancouver, British Columbia, Canada. Both founders previously worked together at Electronic Arts.
