= Janline =

2008 video game

- Xbox 360 cover art
- Developer: Recom
- Publisher: Recom
- Platform: Xbox 360
- Release: JP: September 25, 2008
- Genre: Board game
- Modes: Single-player, multiplayer

Janline (ジャンライン) is a Mahjong game developed and published by Recom for the Xbox 360 system. The game was released on September 25, 2008. On August 6, 2009, Janline R (ジャンラインR) was released for PlayStation 3.

The original Xbox 360 release was met with a negative reception.

== Overview ==
Janline is an online game where the rules of Japanese Mahjong are used. The game is known in the Japanese gaming community as a kusoge, due to the game's quality and its customer support.

== Criticism ==
Immediately after the release of the Xbox 360 version, players wrote about the following problems about the game on online forums:

- The game often froze.
- Tiles which should be shown were hidden.
- The player was offered strange choices of tiles when performing chii.
- There were bugs with calculating points.
- The player who created a room would always be the dealer.
- In online matches, there was no penalty for disconnecting; therefore, one could intentionally disconnect without penalties if one thinks that one is about to lose the game.
- If a player disconnected, the round would suddenly end.

Due to these bugs, the official forums were flooded with demands to fix these bugs, to the point that an apology was issued on the same day as the game's release. The developer and publisher, Recom, promised to release a patch that fixes these bugs.

On December 4, 2008, although the game was updated, it brought in more bugs:

- The game ran slowly.
- Freezing was more frequent. Despite this, a penalty was implemented for disconnection.
- It was possible to intentionally freeze the game through specific actions.
- On exiting the game and returning to the main menu, on the prompt "Would you like to return to the main menu?" there were three options all reading "yes".
- Tiles were distributed as if intentionally.
- Tiles were displayed with a slant.
- With chii, pon and kan, irrelevant tiles would be revealed. If there are the right number of tiles, it was possible to make a winning hand.
- With kan, occasionally only two or three tiles would be removed from the hand. Tiles that were supposed to be removed instead remained in the hand, and it would be impossible to create a winning hand due to excess tiles 多牌 (tāhai).
- With kan, tiles would be stolen from other players' hands. The player performing the kan would have more tiles than necessary, and the other player would have less than necessary 少牌 (shōhai). Neither of these players could then make a winning hand.
- In normal Japanese mahjong rules, if kan is called four times in the same round that are not all by the same player, this round would end in a draw 四槓流れ (sūkan nagare). However, in Janline, there is no draw and a fifth kan can be called.
- If consecutive games were played in the same room, in the second consecutive game, every second tile could be selected; in the game after that, every third tile could be selected, and so on.
- Voices bought in the DLC could not be played.
- The player drew a tile before the previous player discarded. This is called saki-dzumo (先ヅモ) and is against the rules of mahjong.

Recom closed the official forums and blog at the same time as the release of the patch. They did not respond to telephone calls from players, and any emails sent to Recom received automatic replies. As of 20 March 2026, there has not been an official report or apology regarding these bugs.

== Janline R ==
On August 6, 2009, Janline was ported to PlayStation 3 under the name Janline R (ジャンラインR). Janline R added the features of 3D avatars, as well as the ability to use USB cameras. The bugs from the original Janline were fixed in Janline R.
