= 2008 in esports =

2008 in esports are listed here:

Date	Game	Event	Location	Winner/s
February 16	StarCraft: Brood War	2007 Shinhan Bank Proleague	Goyang, South Korea	Lecaf OZ
February 24	Warcraft III	NGL-One Season 4	Berlin, Germany	Meet Your Makers
February 28	F.E.A.R. World in Conflict	CPL World Tour Finals 2007		
March 8	StarCraft: Brood War	GOMTV MSL #4 2008		Lee Jae-dong
March 9	numerous games	WCG 2008 Samsung Euro Championship		
March 9	Counter-Strike; WarCraft III	Extreme Masters (EM) II - Finals		
March 15	StarCraft: Brood War	Bacchus OSL 2008		Lee "Flash" Young-ho
March 16	Unreal Tournament 3	Play.com UT3 National Championship (5v5 iCTF)	London	Soulreapers/pure.gaming
April 13	Gears of War; Halo 3	MLG Meadowlands 2008		
May 3	Halo 3	Halo 3 US Championship	New York City	
	Counter-Strike	KODE5 2008; WarCraft III		
June 15	numerous games	MLG San Diego 2008		
June 29	StarCraft: Brood War; WarCraft III; World of WarCraft	Blizzard Worldwide Invitational 2008		
July 6		ESWC 2008 Masters of Paris		
July 12	StarCraft: Brood War	EVER OSL 2008		Park "July" Sung-joon
July 13	Gears of War; Halo 3 Rainbow Six: Vegas 2 World of WarCraft	MLG Orlando 2008		
July 26	StarCraft: Brood War	Arena MSL 2008		Park "fOrGG" Ji-soo
July 27	WarCraft III	WEG e-Stars 2008		
July 28	Counter-Strike: Source; Dead or Alive 4 FIFA 08; Forza Motorsport 2	2008 Championship Gaming Series Season		
August 8	numerous games	ESL Pro Series Germany Season 12 Finals		
August 8–10	fighting games	Evolution 2008	Tropicana Las Vegas; Las Vegas, Nevada, US	
August 10	StarCraft: Brood War	Averatec-Intel Classic #1		
August 24	Counter-Strike; Counter-Strike: Source	ENC Finals 2008		
August 24	Gears of War; Halo 3 Rainbow Six: Vegas 2	MLG Toronto 2008		
August 27	numerous games	ESWC 2008		
October 5	Gears of War; Halo 3 Rainbow Six: Vegas 2 World of WarCraft	MLG Dallas 2008		
October 5	Counter-Strike; World of WarCraft	EM III - Los Angeles		
October 11	StarCraft: Brood War; WarCraft III; World of WarCraft	BlizzCon 2008		
October 19	Counter-Strike; World of WarCraft	EM III - Montreal		
October 24	Counter-Strike	EM III - Dubai	Dubai, United Arab Emirates	mousesports
November 2	Counter-Strike; WarCraft III	World e-Sports Masters 2008		Team NoA (CS); Wang "Infi" Xu Wen (WarCraft III)
November 9		World Cyber Games 2008		Manuel "Grubby" Schenkhuizen
November 16	Counter-Strike; WarCraft III; World of WarCraft	EM III - Asian Finals - WoW		
November 22	StarCraft: Brood War	ClubDay MSL 2008		Kim "Bisu" Taek-yong
November 23	MLG Vegas 2008	Call of Duty 4: Modern Warfare; Gears of War; Halo 3 Rainbow Six: Vegas 2	Las Vegas	
November 23	Counter-Strike; World of WarCraft	EM III - American Finals		
November 30	numerous games	DreamHack Winter 2008		
December 7	numerous games	EPS Germany Season 13 Finals		
December 18	Counter-Strike; Starcraft: Brood War; WarCraft II	International e-Sports Festival 2008		Kim "Bisu" Taek-yong (Starcraft)
