= FaceBreaker =

2008 video game

- Developer: EA Canada
- Publisher: EA Sports Freestyle
- Platforms: Xbox 360, PlayStation 3, Wii
- Release: Xbox 360, PlayStation 3: AU: September 4, 2008; EU/NA: September 5, 2008; Wii: NA: November 11, 2008; AU: November 13, 2008; EU: November 14, 2008
- Genre: Sports game
- Modes: Single player, multiplayer

FaceBreaker (also titled FaceBreaker K.O. Party for the Wii version) is a fighting game created by EA Canada. It was released for the Xbox 360, Wii, and PlayStation 3 and was announced on January 30, 2008, by 1UP.com. The game was released on September 4, 2008. As of October 2008, the game has sold 52,000 units on the Xbox 360 and PlayStation 3 combined. EA announced in January 2010 that they would be closing down online services for the game on February 2, 2010. It was the first and one of only 3 games that used the EA Freestyle label alongside NASCAR Kart Racing and 3 on 3 NHL Arcade.

== Gameplay ==
FaceBreaker has a "cartoony" artistic style (similar to Punch-Out!! and Ready 2 Rumble Boxing) and allows players to break their opponents' faces as the game features "real-time facial deformation". The game also uses the same face-capture technology as Tiger Woods PGA Tour to allow players to capture their own image using peripherals for the Xbox Live Vision Camera and the PlayStation Eye. The game also contains a "Couch Royale" mode in which friends can compete in a tournament-type game mode.

Fights last three rounds of three minutes each, and can conventionally be won through technical knockout (there is no ten-count for regular knockdowns, as the knocked down character will immediately stand up again). If the three rounds pass without a winner, the match goes into a sudden death round with no time limit, in which the first to knock down the opponent wins regardless of prior score. Alternatively, there is a power gauge which fills as the fighter lands hits; at its maximum, the player can perform a FaceBreaker which, by disfiguring the opponent, counts as an instant-win condition.

== Marketing ==
On February 9, 2008, GameTrailers released the World Premier Exclusive Debut trailer. They also launched Facebreaker Auditions to advertise the game as well by EA Canada.

== Sequel ==
A sequel called FaceBreaker K.O. Party was released for Wii on November 11, 2008. It is merely an enhanced version of its predecessor which was released on Xbox 360 and PlayStation 3 around the same year.

== Reception ==
Reviews

Review scores
Publication	Score
Electronic Gaming Monthly	C−
Game Informer	7.75/10
Official Xbox Magazine (US)	7.0/10

X-Play gave the game a one out of five, citing the broken AI being so difficult to beat that it makes the game basically unplayable. IGN rated it a 5 out of 10. Game Informer, however, gave it a rather positive 7.75 out of 10.

Aaron Thomas of GameSpot gave the game a poor review, scoring it a 3.5/10. He felt that the game featured "cheap AI", "very few game modes" and "bad, button-mashing gameplay". He did say of the game that "it looks pretty good, and the deep customization options mean you'll never want for new brawlers..." However, "unfortunately, there's nothing fun to do with your boxer."

Matt Cabral in his Xbox 360 review of the game for TeamXbox was overall favorable, scoring it a 7/10. He said that "the game actually becomes quite satisfying once you climb the steep learning curve." He did note of the game's difficulty that "while the controls aren't complex, FB's AI boxers give you little room, especially early on, to learn them. Their endless pummeling will leave many frustrated far too soon." He ultimately stated, "there's no question FB has style to spare... those willing to put up with the early beatings will find lots to enjoy both offline and over Xbox Live."
