= The Quest Trio =

2008 video game

- Front box art
- Developers: Mistic Software iWin; Game Brains
- Publisher: Activision
- Platform: Nintendo DS
- Release: NA: August 26, 2008; EU: September 30, 2011
- Genre: Puzzle
- Modes: Single-player, multiplayer

A screenshot of the Jewel Quest II part of The Quest Trio

The Quest Trio is a video game for the Nintendo DS. It was published by Activision in 2008. The "Trio" part of the game's name refers to the 3 selectable games: Jewel Quest II: Jewel Quest Expeditions, Jewel Quest Solitaire, and Mah Jong Quest Expeditions.

== Reception ==
IGN gave the game an 8.1 rating overall. Their highest sub rating was an 8.5 for "Lasting Appeal".
