= Big Beach Sports =

2008 video game

- Developer: HB Studios
- Publisher: THQ
- Platform: Wii
- Release: NA: 24 June 2008; AU: 26 June 2008; EU: 27 June 2008
- Genre: Sports
- Modes: Single-player, multiplayer

Big Beach Sports is a sports game for the Wii developed by HB Studios and produced by THQ. The game is a collection of six beach sports simulations, in which players compete at a beach resort location. The sports include: American football, volleyball, soccer, bocce, cricket and disc golf. The games are not highly realistic simulations of the sports, but are more oriented towards unrealistic physics, stylized beach scenarios, and a simplified rule set. It is most notable for being the third Wii game (the first being Pokémon Battle Revolution and the second being Geometry Wars: Galaxies) to feature connectivity to the Nintendo DS. Big Beach Sports also features the first cricket game on the Wii. It was released on 24 June 2008.

== DS to Wii Connectivity ==
The game utilizes the Download Play feature of the Nintendo DS to allow for character customization. Players can download a small application to the DS from the Wii, allowing them to draw the created character's face (eyes, ears, nose, mouth, and eyebrows). After uploading their creation back to the Wii game, the character will appear in-game with the customized features. This application does not require a DS game to be inserted into the Nintendo DS.

== Gameplay ==
All of the games allow up to 4 players playing at the same time, or in the case of Bocce and Disc Golf, taking alternate turns. All the games use the Wii Remote only; no games require the Nunchuck or any other peripheral.

After creating a character, the player can compete in tournaments against increasingly tougher opponents in any of the sports. Playing Quick Play games and Tournament games earns the character Skill Points. These are then used to calculate the difficulty of the CPU opponent for future Quick Play matches. Hence, after completing all tournaments for all the sports in Big Beach Sports, where each game has a preset difficulty, the player can then return to Quick Play and continue to max out Skill Points (999 points) for each of the six sports. In the case of most of the sports, however, the game becomes extremely challenging, and the AI opponents are much tougher to beat after reaching 900 skill points.

== Reception ==
Reception

Aggregate score
Aggregator	Score
Metacritic	44/100

Review scores
Publication	Score
GameSpot	4.5/10
GameZone	4.0/10
IGN	2.5/10
VideoGamer.com	6/10

Big Beach Sports received a fairly poor reception from critics, with an average Metacritic score of just 44%. IGN was scathing, deriding the game as a "true cash-in project that ignores some of the great control fundamentals laid down with Nintendo's game for an unintelligent waggle-and-win design".

THQ CEO Brian Farrell referred to the game as "an unmitigated success" in the company's Q1 2009 earnings call and referred to it in his strategic plan at the end of 2008. It received a "Platinum" sales award from the Entertainment and Leisure Software Publishers Association (ELSPA), indicating sales of at least 300,000 copies in the United Kingdom.

== Sequel ==
A sequel, Big Beach Sports 2, was released for the Wii in 2010.
