= Deca Sports =

Video game series, 2008–2011

- Genre: Sports game
- Developer: Hudson Soft
- Publisher: Hudson Soft
- Platforms: Wii, Nintendo DS, Xbox 360, Nintendo 3DS
- First release: Deca Sports; March 19, 2008
- Latest release: Deca Sports Extreme; April 28, 2011

Deca Sports (also known as Sports Island in Europe and Deca Sporta in Japan), is a series of sports video games developed and published by Hudson Soft, a former subsidiary of Konami, its IP owner. Games in the series have generally received mixed-to-negative reviews.

== Overview ==
Each installment of the Deca Sports series is a compilation of 10 playable sports. While most of the sports availability differ greatly from game to game, some are repeated across multiple titles, such as volleyball being in the first and third games of the main trilogy (albeit in a different setting), for a total of 47 unique different sports across the series. Players assume the role of a coach who leads one of several preset teams to victory, each with their own strengths and weaknesses derived from the body sizes of each athlete in the team (i.e., smaller athletes are fast, larger athletes are strong and medium-sized athletes have balanced performance stats), or may create their own, starting from the sequel. Games released on consoles take advantage of motion controllers, whether they be the Wii Remote and Nunchuk or the Kinect sensor, to control athletes' actions in the sporting events. All Sports in Deca Sports DS and some sports in Deca Sports Extreme, do not support motion controls at all.

All games in the series have several key modes. Players can choose to play single, casual matches against artificial intelligence or other players, enter into a sports league competition among AI-controlled teams consisting of one match from every sport, partake in a three-round, 8-team single-elimination tournament for one particular sport or test their sports skills in special challenge variations of each sport.

== Games ==
Release timeline
2008	Deca Sports
2009	Deca Sports 2
2010	Deca Sports DS; Deca Sports 3 Deca Sports Freedom
2011	Deca Sports Extreme

The Deca Sports series debuted in 2008 on the Wii and became a trilogy, with installments released annually. Three spin-offs were also released on other platforms. All games in the series were developed and published by Hudson Soft, an eventual subsidiary of Konami in its final year of existence.

=== Deca Sports ===
The first game in the series, released in 2008, features archery, badminton, basketball, beach volleyball, curling, figure skating, go-kart racing, snowboard cross, soccer, and supercross.

=== Deca Sports 2 ===
The sequel to Deca Sports, released in 2009, features darts, dodgeball, ice hockey, kendo, mogul skiing, motorcycle racing, petanque, speed skating, synchronized swimming, and tennis. New features include use of the Nunchuk's motion sensor, the ability to create a custom team and online multiplayer support via Nintendo Wi-Fi Connection.

=== Deca Sports DS ===
The series' first spin-off and the first game not to be released on Wii in the series, released in early 2010 on the Nintendo DS for portable play. It features arm wrestling, two-man bobsledding, cheerleading, golf, rock climbing, rugby, sepak takraw, skeet shooting, skydiving and table tennis, making use of the stylus and touch screen whenever appropriate. The game also supports the use of DS Download Play to play with up to 6 people, only requiring 1 game card.

=== Deca Sports 3 ===
The third and final installment of the main Deca Sports trilogy, released in 2010. It features air racing, fencing, giant slalom, half-pipe snowboarding, kayaking, lacrosse, log-cutting, racquetball, springboard diving, and indoor volleyball, with several of these sports being commonly played in high school or college. New features include an increase of team size from 5 to 6 athletes and support for the Wii MotionPlus accessory.

=== Deca Sports Freedom. Sports Island Freedom (Pal Version) ===
The second spin-off and the only non-Nintendo game in the series, released in late 2010 to capitalize on the Xbox 360's new camera-based Kinect motion controller. Most of its sports return from the first two games in the trilogy and are as follows: archery, beach volleyball, boxing, dodgeball, figure skating, kendo, mogul skiing, paintball, snowboard cross, and tennis.

=== Deca Sports Extreme ===
The third and final spin-off game in the series, and by extension the final game in the series, released in 2011 on the Nintendo 3DS, nearly a year before series developer Hudson Soft dissolved and folded into Konami. It features basketball, blowguns, bowling, ice hockey, snowball fights, snowmobile racing, soccer, sumo wrestling, tennis, and trampolining, making use of the 3DS' motion controls wherever appropriate.
