= List of Nintendo DS Wi-Fi Connection games =

This is a list of WFC compatible games on the Nintendo DS and Nintendo DSi handheld game consoles. These games are playable online out of the box, as long as the system is in range of a properly-configured WiFi router or a Nintendo Wi-Fi USB Connector, and are not to be confused with games that only allow for wireless multi-play within a close physical vicinity (ad-hoc).

After Nintendo's termination of the free Nintendo Wi-Fi Connection service on May 20, 2014, the majority of the game titles remain virtually playable, but their online connectivity and functionality are rendered defunct, even after some of them were re-released digitally. However, some online games can still be played on community-run servers.

== Games ==
=== Nintendo DS ===
| Title | Genre | Number of Players | Developer | Publisher | Available | First Released | Source |
|---|---|---|---|---|---|---|---|
| 100 Classic Book Collection | Puzzle | N/A | Genius Sonority | Nintendo | ^{EU JP} ^{AUS} ^{NA} | 2007-10-18 | |
| Advance Wars: Days of Ruin | Turn-based tactics | 4 | Intelligent Systems | Nintendo | ^{NA} ^{EU} ^{AUS} | 2008-01-21 | |
| Age of Empires: Mythologies | Turn-based strategy | 4 | Griptonite Games | THQ | ^{NA} ^{EU} ^{AUS} | 2008-11-24 | |
| AMF Bowling Pinbusters! | Bowling | | Vir2L Studios / 4J Studios | Vir2L Studios (USA), Koch Media (Europe, Australia) | ^{NA} ^{EU} ^{AUS} | 2008-07-07 | |
| Animal Crossing: Wild World | Life simulation | 4 | Nintendo EAD | Nintendo | ^{NA} ^{EU} ^{AUS} ^{JP} ^{KO} | 2005-11-23 | |
| Arkanoid DS | Arcade | | Taito | Square Enix (NA, PAL), Taito (Japan) | ^{NA} ^{EU} ^{AUS} ^{JP} | 2007-12-06 | |
| Atama wo Kitaete Asobu Taisen Yajirushi Puzzle: Puppynu Vector One | Puzzle | 2 | Megacyber | Megacyber | ^{JP} | 2006-06-29 | |
| Atsumare! Power Pro Kun no DS Koushien | Sports (baseball) | 4 | Konami | Konami | ^{JP} | 2006-08-03 | |
| Avalon Code | Action RPG | | Matrix Software | XSEED Games (USA), Marvelous Interactive (Japan) | ^{NA} ^{EU} ^{JP} | 2008-11-01 | |
| Banushi Life Game: Winner's Circle | Sports (horse racing) | | Genki | Genki | ^{JP} | 2007-10-18 | |
| Blazer Drive | Action | 4 | Sega | Sega | ^{JP} | 2008-12-04 | |
| Bleach: The Blade of Fate | 2-D versus fighting | | Treasure Co. Ltd | Sega | ^{NA} ^{EU} ^{AUS} ^{JP} | 2006-01-26 | |
| Bleach: Dark Souls | 2-D versus fighting | | Treasure Co. Ltd | Sega | ^{NA} ^{EU} ^{JP} | 2007-02-15 | |
| Bolt | Adventure | | Avalanche Software | Disney Interactive | ^{NA EU} | 2008-11-18 | |
| Bomberman 2 | Action | 4 | Hudson Soft | Hudson Soft | ^{EU} ^{JP} | 2008-12-04 | |
| Bomberman Land Touch! | Puzzle / party | 4 | Hudson Soft | Atlus (NA), Rising Star Games (EU), Red Ant Enterprises (AUS), Hudson Soft (JPN), Nintendo (South Korea) | ^{NA} ^{EU} ^{AUS} ^{JP} ^{KO} | 2006-11-08 | |
| Bomberman Land Touch! 2 | Puzzle / party | 4 | Hudson Soft | Hudson Soft (JPN, NA), Rising Star Games (PAL) | ^{NA} ^{EU} ^{AUS} ^{JP} | 2008-01-29 | |
| Bomberman Story DS | Puzzle | 4 | Hudson Soft | Rising Star Games (Europe), 505 Games (Australia), Hudson Soft (Japan) | ^{EU} ^{AUS} ^{JP} | 2007-03-21 | |
| Call of Duty: Black Ops | FPS | 6 | Treyarch / N-Space | Activision | ^{NA} ^{EU} ^{AUS} | 2010-11-09 | |
| Call of Duty: Modern Warfare: Mobilized | FPS | 6 | N-Space | Activision | ^{NA} ^{EU} ^{AUS} | 2009-11-10 | |
| Call of Duty: Modern Warfare 3 – Defiance | FPS | 6 | N-Space | Activision | ^{NA} ^{EU} ^{AUS} | 2011-11-08 | |
| Call of Duty: World at War | FPS | 4 | N-Space | Activision | ^{NA} ^{EU} ^{AUS KOR} | 2008-11-11 | |
| Castlevania: Order of Ecclesia | Action RPG | | Konami | Konami (USA, Europe, Japan, South Korea), Atari (Australia) | ^{NA} ^{JP} ^{KO} ^{EU} ^{AUS} | 2008-10-22 | |
| Castlevania: Portrait of Ruin | Action RPG | 2 | Konami | Konami (USA, Europe, Japan), Atari (Australia) | ^{NA} ^{EU} ^{AUS} ^{JP} | 2006-12-05 | |
| The Chronicles of Narnia: Prince Caspian | Adventure | | Fall Line Studios | Disney Interactive | ^{NA} ^{EU} | 2006-10-09 | |
| Cid to Chocobo no Fushigi na Dungeon: Toki Wasure no Meikyuu DS+ | RPG | | Square Enix | Square Enix | ^{JP} | 2008-10-30 | |
| Chocobo to Mahou no Ehon: Majo to Shoujo to 5-Jin no Yuusha | RPG | | Square Enix | Square Enix | ^{JP} | 2008-12-11 | |
| Civilization Revolution | Turn-based strategy | | Firaxis Games | 2K Games (USA, Europe, Australia), CyberFront (Japan) | ^{NA} ^{EU} ^{AUS} | 2008-07-08 | |
| Club Penguin: Elite Penguin Force | Adventure | N/A | 1st Playable Productions | Disney Interactive | ^{NA EU} | 2008-11-25 | |
| Clubhouse Games (42 All-Time Classics in Europe) | Board game / card game | 8 | Agenda | Nintendo | ^{NA} ^{EU} ^{AUS} ^{JP} | 2006-09-29 | |
| Contact | RPG | | Grasshopper Manufacture | Atlus (NA), Rising Star Games (PAL), Marvelous Interactive (Japan) | ^{NA} ^{EU} ^{AUS} ^{JP KO} | 2006-03-30 | |
| Cookie & Cream | Action-adventure | 4 | From Software | Agetec (USA), 505 Games (Europe, Australia), From Software (Japan) | ^{NA} ^{EU} ^{AUS} ^{JP} | 2007-06-26 | |
| Culdcept DS | Board game | 4 | OmiyaSoft | Sega | ^{JP} | 2008-10-16 | |
| Custom Beat Battle: Draglade 2 | 2D versus fighting / rhythm / RPG | 2 | Dimps | Namco Bandai (Japan) | ^{JP} | 2008-07-10 | |
| Custom Robo Arena | Action RPG | 2 | Noise | Nintendo | ^{NA} ^{EU} ^{AUS} ^{JP} | 2006-10-19 | |
| Derby Stallion DS | Sports (horse racing) | | Enterbrain | Enterbrain | ^{JP} | 2008-06-26 | |
| Diary Girl | Simulation | | Konami | Konami | ^{NA} | 2008-03-18 | |
| Diddy Kong Racing DS | Kart racing | 4 | Rare | Nintendo | ^{NA} ^{EU} ^{AUS} | 2007-02-05 | |
| Digimon World Championship | Battle/RPG | 2 | Namco Bandai | Namco Bandai | ^{NA} ^{JP} ^{KO} | 2008-02-14 | |
| Digimon World Dawn and Dusk | RPG | 2 | Namco Bandai | Namco Bandai | ^{NA} ^{JP} | 2007-09-18 | |
| Digimon World DS | RPG | 2 | Namco Bandai | Namco Bandai | ^{NA} ^{JP} | 2006-11-07 | |
| Dinosaur King | RPG | 2 | Climax Entertainment | Sega | ^{NA} ^{EU} ^{JP} | 2007-11-11 | |
| Disney Fairies: Tinker Bell | Simulation | | Disney Interactive | Disney Interactive | ^{NA} | 2008-10-28 | |
| Disney Friends | Adventure | 2 | Amaze Entertainment | Disney Interactive | ^{NA} ^{EU} | 2008-02-26 | |
| Doraemon: Nobita no Shin Makai Daibouken DS | Card game | 2 | Sega | Sega | ^{JP} | 2007-03-08 | |
| Draglade | 2D versus fighting / rhythm / RPG | 2 | Dimps | Atlus (USA), 505 Games (Europe), Banpresto (Japan) | ^{NA} ^{EU} ^{JP} | 2007-06-07 | |
| Dragon Quest IX: Sentinels of the Starry Skies | RPG | | Level-5 | Square Enix | ^{NA} ^{EU} ^{AUS} ^{JP} | 2009-03-28 | |
| Dragon Quest Monsters: Joker | RPG | 1 | TOSE | Square Enix (NA, EU, JPN), Ubisoft (AUS) | ^{NA} ^{EU} ^{AUS} ^{JP} | 2006-12-28 | |
| Dragon Zakura DS | Action | | Electronic Arts | Electronic Arts | ^{JP} | 2007-03-08 | |
| Dramatic Dungeon: Sakura Taisen - Kimi Aru ga Tame | Turn-based strategy | 4 | Neverland | Sega | ^{JP} | 2008-03-19 | |
| Ducati Moto | Racing | | Vir2L Studios / 4J Studios | Vir2L Studios (USA), Koch Media (Europe) | ^{NA} ^{EU} | 2008-07-01 | |
| Dungeon Explorer: Warriors of Ancient Arts | Action RPG | | Hudson Soft | Hudson Soft (USA, Australia, Japan), Rising Star Games (Europe) | ^{NA} ^{EU} ^{AUS} ^{JP} | 2007-11-15 | |
| Eco Creatures: Save the Forest | RPG | 2 | Bergsala Lightweight / Headlock Corporation | Interchannel (Japan), Majesco (USA), Rising Star Games (Europe) | ^{NA} ^{EU} ^{JP} | 2007-08-23 | |
| Elebits: Kai to Zero no Fushigi na Tabi (known as Elebits: The Adventures of Kai and Zero in USA) | Adventure | | Konami | Konami | ^{JP} ^{KO} | 2008-12-11 | |
| Ener-G: Dance Squad | Dance | | Lexis Numerique | Ubisoft | ^{NA} | 2008-10-21 | |
| Exit DS | Action / puzzle | N/A | Taito | Square Enix (NA, EU), Ubisoft (AUS), Taito (JPN), Cyberfront (South Korea) | ^{NA} ^{EU} ^{AUS} ^{JP} ^{KO} | 2008-01-24 | |
| Fab 5 Soccer | Sports (soccer) | 2 | Destineer | Destineer | ^{NA} | 2008-04-11 | |
| FIFA Soccer 08 | Sports (soccer) | 2 | EA Canada | EA Sports | ^{NA} ^{EU} ^{AUS} ^{KO} | 2007-09-27 | |
| FIFA Soccer 09 | Sports (soccer) | 2 | EA Canada / Exient Entertainment | EA Sports | ^{NA} ^{EU} ^{AUS} ^{KO} | 2008-10-02 | |
| FIFA Soccer 10 | Sports (soccer) | 2 | EA Canada / Exient Entertainment | EA Sports | ^{NA} ^{EU} ^{AUS} | 2009-10-01 | |
| FIFA Soccer 11 | Sports (soccer) | 2 | EA Canada / Exient Entertainment | EA Sports | ^{NA} ^{EU} ^{AUS} | 2010-09-28 | |
| FIFA Street 3 | Sports (soccer) | 2 | EA Canada / Exient Entertainment | EA Sports | ^{NA} ^{EU} ^{AUS} | 2008-02-18 | |
| Final Fantasy III | RPG | 2 | Square Enix / Matrix Software | Square Enix | ^{NA} ^{EU} ^{AUS} ^{JP} | 2006-11-14 | |
| Final Fantasy Crystal Chronicles: Ring of Fates | Action RPG | 4 | Square Enix | Square Enix | ^{NA} ^{EU} ^{AUS} ^{JP} | 2007-08-23 | |
| Final Fantasy Crystal Chronicles: Echoes of Time | Action RPG | 4 | Square Enix | Square Enix | ^{JP} ^{NA} | 2009-01-29 | |
| Final Fantasy Fables: Chocobo Tales | RPG / card game | 2 | Square Enix | Square Enix | ^{NA} ^{EU} ^{AUS} ^{JP} | 2007-04-03 | |
| Fire Emblem: Shadow Dragon | Strategy | 2 | Intelligent System | Nintendo | ^{EU} ^{JP} | 2008-08-07 | |
| Fullmetal Alchemist: Trading Card Game | Trading card game | | Magellan | Destineer | ^{NA} | 2007-10-15 | |
| Fushigi no Dungeon: Fuurai no Shiren DS 2 - Sabaku no Majou (tentatively known as Mystery Dungeon Shiren the Wanderer DS2: Magic Castle of the Desert for USA) | Adventure RPG | | Chunsoft | Sega | ^{JP} | 2008-11-13 | |
| Gensen Table Game DS: Wi-Fi Taiou | Table game | 4 | Hudson Soft | Hudson Soft | ^{JP} | 2007-08-02 | |
| Geometry Wars: Galaxies | Shoot 'em up | N/A | Bizarre Creations / Kuju Entertainment | Sierra Entertainment | ^{NA} ^{EU} ^{AUS} | 2007-11-27 | |
| GoPets: Vacation Island | Life simulation | 2 | 1st Playable Productions | Konami | ^{NA} | 2008-03-18 | |
| Grand Theft Auto: Chinatown Wars | Action | 2 | Rockstar Games | Rockstar Games | ^{NA} ^{EU} ^{AUS} ^{JP} | 2009-03-17 | |
| GRID | Racing | 4 | Firebrand Games | Codemasters | ^{NA} ^{EU} ^{AUS} ^{JP} | 2008-08-05 | |
| Hannah Montana: Music Jam | Music Game | | Fall Line Studios / Gorilla Systems | Disney Interactive | ^{NA} ^{EU} | 2007-10-16 | |
| Harvest Moon DS: Grand Bazaar | Life simulation | | Marvelous Entertainment | Marvelous Entertainment | ^{JP} | 2008-12-18 | |
| Harvest Moon DS: Island of Happiness | Simulation | | Marvelous Interactive | Natsume Inc. (USA), Rising Star Games (Europe), Marvelous Interactive (Japan) | ^{NA} ^{EU} ^{JP} | 2007-02-01 | |
| Harvest Moon DS: Sunshine Islands | Life simulation | | Marvelous Entertainment | Marvelous Entertainment (Japan), Natsume Inc. (USA) | ^{JP} | 2008-02-21 | |
| Heroes of Mana | Strategy RPG | N/A | Brownie Brown | Square Enix (JPN, NA, EU), Ubisoft (AUS) | ^{NA} ^{EU} ^{AUS} ^{JP} | 2007-03-08 | |
| High School Musical 3: Senior Year | Music game | | Griptonite Games | Disney Interactive | ^{NA} ^{EU} ^{AUS} | 2007-10-21 | |
| Itadaki Street DS | Party | 4 | Hero Garage | Square Enix | ^{JP} | 2007-06-21 | |
| Jam with the Band | Music game | N/A | Nintendo R&D2 | Nintendo | ^{EU} ^{JP} | 2008-06-26 | |
| Jet Impulse (tentatively known as DS Air for USA) | Flight simulator / shooter | 2 | Nintendo | Nintendo | ^{JP} | 2007-02-08 | |
| Jump Ultimate Stars | 2D versus fighting | 4 | Ganbarion | Nintendo | ^{JP} | 2006-11-23 | |
| Kaite Shabette Hajimeyou!: Monster Farm DS (tentatively known as Monster Rancher DS for USA) | RPG | 2 | Tecmo | Tecmo | ^{JP} | 2007-07-12 | |
| Kanshuu Nihon Joushikiryoku Kentei Kyoukai: Imasara Hito ni wa Kikenai Otona no Joushikiryoku Training DS | Educational | N/A | Nintendo | Nintendo | ^{JP} | 2006-10-26 | |
| Kenkou Ouen Recipe 1000: DS Kondate Zenshuu | Simulation | N/A | Nintendo | Nintendo | ^{JP} | 2006-12-07 | |
| Kidou Gekidan Haro Ichiza: Gundam Mahjong +Z - Sarani Dekiru You ni Natta Na! | Board game (mahjong) | 4 | Namco Bandai | Namco Bandai | ^{JP} | 2007-09-06 | |
| Konductra | Music / puzzle | | oeFun | O3 Entertainment | ^{NA} | 2006-10-31 | |
| Kousoku Card Battle: Card Hero | RPG / card game | | Intelligent Systems | Nintendo | ^{JP} | 2007-12-20 | |
| The Legend of Zelda: Phantom Hourglass | Adventure / strategy | 2 | Nintendo EAD | Nintendo | ^{NA} ^{EU} ^{AUS} ^{JP} ^{KO} | 2007-06-23 | |
| Line Rider 2: Unbound | Puzzle | N/A | InXile Entertainment | Genius Products | ^{NA} | 2008-09-16 | |
| LostMagic | Real-time strategy RPG | 2 | Taito / Garakuta Studio | Ubisoft (USA, Europe, Australia), Taito (Japan) | ^{NA} ^{EU} ^{AUS} ^{JP} | 2006-01-19 | |
| Luminous Arc | Tactical RPG | 2 | Marvelous Interactive | Atlus (USA), Rising Star Games (Europe, Australia), Marvelous Interactive (Japan) | ^{NA} ^{EU} ^{AUS} ^{JP} | 2007-02-08 | |
| Luminous Arc 2 | Tactical RPG | 2 | Marvelous Interactive | Atlus (USA), Marvelous Interactive (Japan) | ^{NA} ^{JP} | 2008-05-15 | |
| Madden NFL 08 | Sports (American football) | 2 | EA Tiburon | EA Sports | ^{NA} | 2007-08-14 | |
| Madden NFL 09 | Sports (American football) | 2 | EA Tiburon | EA Sports | ^{NA} ^{EU} | 2008-08-12 | |
| Magical Starsign | RPG | | Brownie Brown | Nintendo | ^{NA} ^{EU} ^{JP} | 2006-06-22 | |
| Mah Jong Quest Expeditions | Puzzle | | iWin | Activision Value | ^{NA} ^{EU} | 2007-10-16 | |
| Mahjong Fight Club DS: Wi-Fi Taiou | Board game | | Konami | Konami | ^{JP} | 2006-12-07 | |
| Major League Baseball 2K8 Fantasy All-Stars | Sports (baseball) | 2 | Deep Fried Entertainment | 2K Sports | ^{NA} | 2008-04-18 | |
| Mario & Sonic at the Olympic Games | Sports | N/A | Sega Japan / Sega Sports | Sega (USA, Europe, Australia), Nintendo (Japan, South Korea) | ^{NA} ^{EU} ^{AUS} ^{JP} ^{KO} | 2007-11-06 | |
| Mario Kart DS | Kart racing | 4 | Nintendo | Nintendo | ^{NA} ^{EU} ^{AUS} ^{KO} ^{JP} | 2005-11-14 | |
| Mario vs. Donkey Kong 2: March of the Minis | Puzzle | N/A | Nintendo Software Technology | Nintendo | ^{NA} ^{EU} ^{AUS} ^{JP} | 2006-09-25 | |
| Marvel Trading Card Game | Trading card game | 2 | Vicious Cycle Software | Konami | ^{NA} | 2007-05-22 | |
| Mawashite Tsunageru Touch Panic | Puzzle | 2 | AKI Corporation | Nintendo | ^{JP} | 2006-05-26 | |
| Mega Man Star Force | Action RPG | | Capcom | Capcom | ^{NA} ^{JP} | 2006-12-14 | |
| Mega Man Star Force 2 | Action RPG | | Capcom | Capcom | ^{NA} ^{JP} | 2007-11-22 | |
| Mega Man Star Force 3 | Action RPG | | Capcom | Capcom | ^{NA} ^{JP} | 2008-11-13 | |
| Metroid Prime Hunters | FPS / adventure | 4 | Nintendo Software Technology | Nintendo | ^{NA} ^{EU} ^{AUS} ^{JP} ^{KO} | 2006-03-20 | |
| Momotarou Dentetsu: 20-Shuunen | Board game / card game | | Hudson Soft | Hudson Soft | ^{JP} | 2008-12-18 | |
| Monster Farm DS 2: Yomigaeru! Master Breeder Densetsu | RPG | | Tecmo | Tecmo | ^{JP} | 2008-08-07 | |
| Morita Shougi DS: Wi-Fi Taiou | Board game | | Hudson | Hudson | ^{JP} | 2007-02-08 | |
| My Secret World | Puzzle / diary | 2 | Ubisoft | Ubisoft | ^{NA} ^{EU} ^{AUS} | 2008-09-16 | |
| Mystery Dungeon: Shiren the Wanderer | Adventure RPG | N/A | Chunsoft | Sega | ^{NA} ^{EU} ^{AUS} ^{JP} | 2006-12-14 | |
| n+ | Action | N/A | Slick Entertainment / SilverBirch Studios | Atari (USA), SilverBirch Studios (Australia) | ^{NA} | 2008-08-06 | |
| Nanostray 2 | Shooter | N/A | Shin'en | Majesco (USA, Europe), Atari (Australia) | ^{NA} ^{EU} ^{AUS} | 2008-03-11 | |
| Naruto: Path of the Ninja 2 | Role-playing video game | | TOSE | D3 Publisher | ^{NA} | 2008-10-15 | |
| Naruto Shippuden: Saikyo Ninja Daikesshuu 5 Kessen! "Akatsuki" | RPG | | Takara Tomy | Takara Tomy | ^{JP} | 2007-07-19 | |
| Nazonazo & Quiz: Ittou Nyuukon Q Mate! | Game show / trivia | | Konami | Konami | ^{JP} | 2008-10-16 | |
| Need for Speed: ProStreet | Racing | 4 | Black Box Games | Electronic Arts | ^{NA} ^{EU} ^{AUS} ^{KO} | 2007-11-13 | |
| Need for Speed: Undercover | Racing | 4 | EA Vancouver | Electronic Arts | ^{NA} ^{EU} ^{AUS} | 2008-11-17 | |
| New International Track & Field | Sports | 4 | Sumo Digital | Konami | ^{NA} ^{EU} ^{JP} ^{KO} | 2008-06-20 | |
| Ninja Gaiden: Dragon Sword | Action-adventure | | Team Ninja | Tecmo (USA, Japan), Ubisoft (Europe, Australia) | ^{NA} ^{EU} ^{AUS} ^{JP} ^{KO} | 2008-03-20 | |
| Ninjatown | Real-time strategy | | Venan Entertainment | SouthPeak Games | ^{NA} | 2008-10-28 | |
| Nintendo DS Browser | Web browser | N/A | Opera Software | Nintendo | ^{NA} ^{EU} ^{AUS} ^{JP} | 2007-06-04 | |
| Nobunaga no Yabou DS 2 | Strategy | | Koei | Koei | ^{JP} | 2008-07-31 | |
| Othello de Othello DS | Board game | | MegaHouse | MegaHouse | ^{JP} | 2008-05-22 | |
| Open Season | Adventure / platformer | | Ubisoft | Ubisoft | ^{NA} ^{EU} ^{AUS} | 2006-09-19 | |
| Pang: Magical Michael | Puzzle | | Mitchell Corporation | Rising Star Games | ^{EU} | 2010-09-17 | |
| Panzer Tactics DS | Strategy | | Sproing | Conspiracy Entertainment (USA), 10tacle Studios (Europe) | ^{NA} ^{EU} | 2007-11-07 | |
| Personal Trainer: Walking | Fitness game | N/A | Nintendo / Creatures Inc. | Nintendo | ^{JP} ^{US} ^{EU} | 2008-11-01 | |
| Phantasy Star Zero | Action RPG | 4 | Sonic Team | Sega | ^{JP} ^{US} ^{EU} | 2008-12-25 | |
| Picross DS | Puzzle | | Jupiter | Nintendo | ^{NA} ^{EU} ^{AUS} ^{JP} ^{KO} | 2007-01-25 | |
| Planet Puzzle League | Puzzle | 2 | Intelligent Systems | Nintendo | ^{NA} ^{EU} ^{JP} | 2007-04-26 | |
| Pogo Island | Party | | Electronic Arts | Electronic Arts | ^{NA} ^{EU} ^{AUS} | 2007-03-26 | |
| Pokémon Black and White | RPG | | Game Freak | Nintendo, The Pokémon Company | ^{NA} ^{EU} ^{AUS} ^{JP} ^{KO} | 2010-09-18 | |
| Pokémon Black 2 and White 2 | RPG | | Game Freak | Nintendo, The Pokémon Company | ^{NA} ^{EU} ^{AUS} ^{JP} ^{KO} | 2012-06-23 | |
| Pokémon Diamond and Pearl | RPG | | Game Freak | Nintendo, The Pokémon Company | ^{NA} ^{EU} ^{AUS} ^{JP} ^{KO} | 2006-09-28 | |
| Pokémon HeartGold and SoulSilver | RPG | | Game Freak | Nintendo, The Pokémon Company | ^{NA} ^{EU} ^{AUS} ^{JP} ^{KO} | 2009-09-12 | |
| Pokémon Mystery Dungeon: Explorers of Time and Explorers of Darkness | RPG | | Chunsoft | Nintendo | ^{NA} ^{EU} ^{AUS} ^{JP} ^{KO} | 2007-08-13 | |
| Pokémon Platinum | RPG | | Game Freak | Nintendo | ^{JP} ^{NA} ^{AUS} ^{EU} ^{KO} | 2008-09-13 | |
| Pokémon Ranger: Shadows of Almia | RPG | | HAL Laboratory | Nintendo | ^{NA} ^{EU} ^{JP} ^{AUS} | 2008-03-20 | |
| Power Pro Kun Pocket 10 | Sports (baseball) | | Konami | Konami | ^{JP} | 2007-12-06 | |
| Power Pro Kun Pocket 11 | Sports (baseball) | | Konami | Konami | ^{JP} | 2008-12-04 | |
| Prey the Stars | Action | | Koei | Koei | ^{NA} ^{JP} ^{EU} ^{AUS} | 2008-09-25 | |
| Pro Evolution Soccer 2008 | Sports (soccer) | | Konami | Konami | ^{NA} ^{EU} ^{AUS} ^{JP} | 2007-10-25 | |
| Pro Yakyuu Famista DS | Sports (baseball) | | Namco Bandai | Namco Bandai | ^{JP} | 2007-11-15 | |
| Professor Layton and the Curious Village | Text adventure / puzzle | N/A | Level-5 | Nintendo (USA, Europe, Australia, South Korea), Level-5 (Japan) | ^{NA} ^{EU} ^{AUS} ^{JP} ^{KO} | 2007-02-15 | |
| Professor Layton and the Diabolical Box | Text adventure / puzzle | N/A | Level-5 | Nintendo (USA, Europe, Australia, South Korea), Level-5 (Japan) | ^{NA} ^{EU} ^{AUS} ^{JP} ^{KO} | 2007-11-29 | |
| Professor Layton and the Last Specter | Text adventure / puzzle | N/A | Level-5 | Nintendo (USA, Europe, Australia), Level-5 (Japan) | ^{NA} ^{EU} ^{AUS} ^{JP} | 2009-11-26 | |
| Professor Layton and the Unwound Future | Text adventure / puzzle | N/A | Level-5 | Nintendo (USA, Europe, Australia), Level-5 (Japan) | ^{NA} ^{EU} ^{AUS} ^{JP} | 2008-11-27 | |
| Puyo Puyo 15th Anniversary | Puzzle | 4 | Sega | Sega | ^{JP} | 2006-12-14 | |
| Puyo Puyo!! 20th Anniversary | Puzzle | 4 | Sega | Sega | ^{JP} | 2011-07-14 | |
| Puyo Puyo 7 | Puzzle | 4 | Sega | Sega | ^{JP} | 2009-07-30 | |
| Quiz Magic Academy DS | Quiz | | Konami | Konami | ^{JP} | 2008-09-12 | |
| Race Driver: Create and Race | Racing | 4 | Firebrand Games | Codemasters | ^{NA} ^{EU} ^{AUS} | 2007-09-25 | |
| Ragnarok Online DS | Action RPG | | GungHo Works | GungHo Works | ^{NA} ^{JP} | 2008-12-18 | |
| River King: Mystic Valley | RPG / fishing | | Marvelous Entertainment | Natsume Inc. (USA), Rising Star Games (Europe), Marvelous Entertainment (Japan) | ^{NA} ^{EU} ^{JP} | 2007-06-28 | |
| Rune Factory: A Fantasy Harvest Moon | Simulation RPG | | Neverland Co., Ltd. | Natsume Inc. (USA), Marvelous Interactive (Japan), Rising Star Games (Europe) | ^{NA} ^{JP} ^{EU} | 2007-08-14 | |
| Rune Factory 2: A Fantasy Harvest Moon | Simulation RPG | | Neverland Co., Ltd. | NNatsume Inc. (USA), Marvelous Interactive (Japan), Rising Star Games (Europe) | ^{NA} ^{JP} ^{EU} | 2008-01-03 | |
| Rune Factory 3: A Fantasy Harvest Moon | Simulation RPG | | Neverland Co., Ltd. | Natsume Inc. (USA), Marvelous Interactive (Japan), Rising Star Games (Europe) | ^{NA} ^{JP} ^{EU} | 2009-10-22 | |
| Sangokushi DS | Strategy | | Koei | Koei | ^{JP} ^{KO} | 2006-02-23 | |
| Sangokushi DS 2 | Strategy | | Koei | Koei | ^{JP} ^{KO} | 2007-11-01 | |
| Sangokushi Taisen DS | Real-time strategy / card game | | Sega | Sega | ^{JP} | 2007-01-25 | |
| Sankei Sports Kanshuu: Wi-Fi Baken Yosou Ryoku Training - Umania 2007 Nendo Ban | Sports (horse racing) | | Dimple Entertainment | Dimple Entertainment | ^{JP} | 2007-11-27 | |
| Scribblenauts | Puzzle-action (emergent) | N/A | 5th Cell | Warner Bros. Interactive Entertainment | ^{NA} ^{EU} ^{AUS} | 2009-09-15 | |
| Skate It | Extreme sports (skateboarding) | | Electronic Arts | Electronic Arts | ^{NA} ^{EU} | 2008-11-17 | |
| Solatorobo: Red The Hunter | Adventure / platformer | | CyberConnect2 | Namco Bandai (Japan), Xseed Games (USA), Nintendo (Europe) | ^{NA} ^{EU} ^{JP} | 2010-10-28 | |
| Sonic Rush Adventure | Adventure / platformer | 2 | Dimps / Sonic Team | Sega | ^{NA} ^{EU} ^{AUS} ^{JP} ^{KO} | 2007-09-14 | |
| Space Invaders Extreme | Arcade | 2 | Taito | Square Enix (NA, EU), Ubisoft (AUS), Taito (Japan) | ^{NA} ^{EU} ^{AUS} ^{JP} | 2008-02-21 | |
| Space Invaders Extreme 2 | Arcade | 2 | Taito | Square Enix | ^{NA} ^{EU} ^{AUS} ^{JP} | 2009-03-26 | |
| Space Puzzle Bobble | Puzzle | | Taito | Taito | ^{JP} | 2008-12-18 | |
| Spectrobes | Action RPG | | Jupiter | Disney Interactive | ^{NA} ^{EU} ^{AUS} ^{JP} | 2007-03-13 | |
| Spectrobes: Beyond the Portals | Action RPG | | Jupiter | Disney Interactive | ^{NA} | 2008-10-07 | |
| Spore Creatures | Life simulation | | Foundation 9 | Electronic Arts | ^{NA} ^{EU} | 2008-09-05 | |
| Star Fox Command | Shooter | 3 | Q-Games | Nintendo | ^{NA} ^{EU} ^{AUS} ^{JP} | 2006-08-28 | |
| Steal Princess: Touzoku Koujo | RPG | | Climax Entertainment | Rising Star Games (Europe), Marvelous Interactive (Japan) | ^{JP} | 2008-07-24 | |
| Sudoku DS - Nikoli no 'Sudoku' Ketteiban | Puzzle | | Hudson Soft | Hudson Soft | ^{JP} | 2008-05-29 | |
| Suikoden Tierkreis | RPG | | Konami | Konami | ^{JP} | 2008-12-18 | |
| Surf's Up | Extreme sports (surfing) | | Ubisoft Montreal | Ubisoft | ^{NA} ^{EU} ^{AUS} | 2007-05-29 | |
| Suujin Taisen | Puzzle | | Mitchell Corporation | Nintendo | ^{JP} | 2007-06-07 | |
| Tank Beat | Strategy | | Milestone | O3 Entertainment (USA), Milestone (Japan) | ^{NA} ^{JP} | 2006-11-30 | |
| Tank Beat 2: Gekitotsu! Deutsch-gun vs. Rengou-gun (Tentatively known as Heavy Armor Brigade for USA) | Strategy | | Milestone | Milestone (Japan), Daewon Media (South Korea) | ^{JP} ^{KO} | 2007-11-29 | |
| Tecmo Bowl: Kickoff | Sports (American football) | | Tecmo | Tecmo | ^{NA} | 2008-11-18 | |
| Tenchu: Dark Secret | Action | | From Software | Nintendo (USA, Australia), From Software (Europe, Japan) | ^{NA} ^{EU} ^{AUS} ^{JP} | 2006-04-06 | |
| Tenohira Gakushuu: Chikyuu no Narabe Kata | Action | | Success | Success | ^{JP} | 2007-12-07 | |
| Tetris DS | Puzzle | 4 | Nintendo | Nintendo | ^{NA} ^{EU} ^{AUS} ^{KO} ^{JP} | 2006-03-20 | |
| Tetris Party Deluxe | Puzzle | 4 | Nintendo | Nintendo | ^{NA} ^{EU} ^{JP} | 2010-05-25 | |
| Tiger Woods PGA Tour 08 | Sports (golf) | 2 | EA Sports | EA Sports | ^{NA} ^{EU} ^{AUS} | 2007-08-28 | |
| Tongari Boushi no Mahou no 365 Nichi (known as Little Magicians for USA) | RPG | | Konami | Konami | ^{JP} | 2008-11-13 | |
| Tony Hawk's American Sk8land | Extreme sports (skateboarding) | | Vicarious Visions | Activision | ^{NA} ^{EU} ^{AUS} | 2005-11-16 | |
| Tony Hawk's Downhill Jam | Extreme sports (skateboarding) / racing | | Vicarious Visions | Activision | ^{NA} ^{EU} ^{AUS} | 2006-10-24 | |
| Tony Hawk's Proving Ground | Extreme sports (skateboarding) | | Vicarious Visions | Activision | ^{NA} ^{EU} ^{AUS} | 2007-10-15 | |
| TouchMaster DS | Minigame Mash | | Midway | Midway | ^{NA} ^{EU} ^{AUS} | 2007-06-25 | |
| Transformers Autobots / Transformers Decepticons | Third-person shooter | | Vicarious Visions | Activision | ^{NA} ^{AUS} | 2007-06-19 | |
| Treasure World | Real-world adventure | | Aspyr | Aspyr | ^{NA} | 2009-07-02 | |
| Ultimate Band | Music game | | Disney Interactive | Disney Interactive | ^{NA} | 2008-11-18 | |
| Ultimate Mortal Kombat | Fighting | 2 | Other Ocean Interactive | Midway | ^{NA} ^{EU} | 2007-11-12 | |
| Wagamama Fashion: Girls Mode | Life simulation | | Nintendo | Nintendo | ^{JP} | 2008-10-23 | |
| WarioWare D.I.Y. | mini-game compilation and design | N/A | Nintendo SPD Group No.1; Intelligent Systems | Nintendo | ^{JP} ^{NA} ^{EU} ^{AUS} | 2009-04-29 | |
| Warhammer 40,000: Squad Command | Real-time tactics | 8 | RedLynx | THQ | ^{NA} ^{EU} ^{AUS} | 2007-12-17 | |
| Winning Eleven: Pro Evolution Soccer 2007 (Pro Evolution Soccer 6 in Europe) | Sports (soccer) | | Konami | Konami | ^{NA} ^{EU} ^{KO} ^{JP} | 2006-11-01 | |
| WordJong | Board game | 2 | Destineer | Destineer | ^{NA} | 2007-11-16 | |
| Worms: Open Warfare 2 | Artillery game | | Team17 | THQ | ^{NA} ^{EU} | 2007-08-31 | |
| Yakuman DS | Board game | | Intelligent Systems | Nintendo | ^{JP} | 2005-03-31 | |
| Yu-Gi-Oh! Duel Monsters GX: Spirit Summoner | Card game | | Konami | Konami (Japan, USA, Europe), Atari (Australia) | ^{NA} ^{EU} ^{AUS} ^{JP} | 2006-11-30 | |
| Yu-Gi-Oh! Duel Monsters: WORLD CHAMPIONSHIP 2007 | Card game | | Konami | Konami (Japan, USA, Europe), Atari (Australia) | ^{NA} ^{EU} ^{AUS} ^{JP} | 2007-03-15 | |
| Yu-Gi-Oh! Duel Monsters GX: WORLD CHAMPIONSHIP 2008 | Card game | | Konami | Konami (Japan, USA, Europe, South Korea), Atari (Australia) | ^{NA} ^{EU} ^{AUS} ^{JP} ^{KO} | 2007-11-29 | |

=== DSi-only Titles ===
| Title | Genre | Number of Players | Developer | Publisher | Available | First Released | Source |
|---|---|---|---|---|---|---|---|
| Foto Showdown | Turn-based | | Alpha Unit | JP: Alpha Unit NA: Konami | ^{NA} ^{JP} | 2009-11-19 | |
| Hidden Photo | Computer puzzle game, turn-based strategy | | Most Wanted Entertainment | PQube Ltd. | ^{EU} | Early 2011 | Sujin Taisen: Number Battles |
| Picture Perfect Hair Salon | Simulation | | Sonic Powered Co. Ltd | 505 Games | ^{NA EU AUS} | 2009-11-13 | |

=== DSiWare ===
| Title | Genre | Number of Players | Developer | Publisher | Available | First Released | Source |
|---|---|---|---|---|---|---|---|
| Bomberman Blitz | Action | 4 | Hudson Soft | Hudson Soft | ^{NA} ^{EU} ^{JP} | 2009-11-09 | |
| Dragon Quest Wars | Turn-based strategy | | IntelligentSystems Tose | Square Enix | ^{NA EU AUS JP} | 2009-06-24 | |
| Mario vs. Donkey Kong: Minis March Again! | Puzzle | N/A | Nintendo Software Technology | Nintendo | ^{NA EU AUS JP} | 2009-06-08 | |
| Metal Torrent | Action | | Arika | Nintendo iQue (CHN) | ^{NA EU AUS JP KO CHN} | 2010-05-07 | |
| Sujin Taisen: Number Battles | Computer puzzle game, turn-based strategy | | Mitchell Corporation | Nintendo iQue (CHN) | ^{NA} ^{EU AUS CHN} | 2010-01-25 | Sujin Taisen: Number Battles |
| System Flaw: Recruit | Shooter | | Visual Impact | NA: Storm City Games EU/AUS: Enjoy Gaming | ^{NA EU AUS} | 2010-04-16 | |
| Tetris Party Live | Puzzle | 4 | Hudson SoftBlue Planet Software | NA/EU: Tetris Online, Inc. AU: Nintendo | ^{NA EU AUS} | 2010-10-22 | |
| UNO | Card game | 4 | Gameloft | Gameloft | ^{NA EU AUS} | 2009-11-20 | |

== See also ==
- List of Nintendo DS games
- List of DSiWare games and applications
- List of Nintendo 3DS Wi-Fi Connection games
- List of Wii Wi-Fi Connection games
