= Lists of games on Nintendo consoles =

Nintendo logo

Lists of games on Nintendo consoles covers video games provided by Nintendo. The lists include lists of games for home consoles, handheld consoles, hybrid and others. For games produced by Nintendo and other products by Nintendo, see List of Nintendo products.

== Home consoles ==
- List of Famicom/NES games
  - List of Famicom Disk System games
  - List of best-selling Nintendo Entertainment System video games
- List of Super Famicom/Super NES games
  - List of best-selling Super Nintendo Entertainment System video games
- List of Nintendo 64 games
  - List of best-selling Nintendo 64 video games
- List of GameCube games
  - List of best-selling GameCube video games
- List of Wii games
  - List of WiiWare games
  - List of Wii games using WiiConnect24
  - List of best-selling Wii video games
- List of Wii U games
  - List of Wii games on Wii U eShop
  - List of best-selling Wii U video games

== Handheld consoles ==
- List of Game & Watch games
- List of Game Boy games
  - List of Super Game Boy games
  - List of multiplayer Game Boy games
  - List of best-selling Game Boy video games
- List of Virtual Boy games
- List of Game Boy Color games
- List of Game Boy Advance games
  - List of best-selling Game Boy Advance video games
- List of Nintendo DS games
  - List of DSiWare games
  - List of Nintendo DS Wi-Fi Connection games
  - List of best-selling Nintendo DS video games
- List of Nintendo 3DS games (0–M)
  - List of Nintendo 3DS games (N–Z)
  - List of best-selling Nintendo 3DS video games

== Hybrid consoles ==
- List of Nintendo Switch games
  - List of best-selling Nintendo Switch video games
- List of Nintendo Switch 2 games
  - List of best-selling Nintendo Switch 2 games

== Virtual consoles ==
- List of Virtual Console games for Wii
- List of Virtual Console games for Nintendo 3DS
- List of Virtual Console games for Wii U

== See also ==
- Nintendo Classics
- Wii Shop Channel
- WiiWare
