= Dustforce =

2012 video game

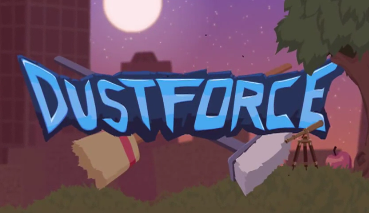
- Logo from the pre-release trailer
- Developer: Hitbox Team
- Publishers: Digerati Distribution; PS3, Vita, X360; Capcom
- Composer: Terence Lee
- Platforms: Windows, OS X, Linux, PlayStation 3, PlayStation Vita, Xbox 360
- Release: January 17, 2012: Windows; WW: January 17, 2012 OS X; WW: May 1, 2012 Linux; WW: September 18, 2012 PlayStation 3, Vita; NA: February 4, 2014; EU: February 5, 2014 Xbox 360; WW: April 25, 2014
- Genre: Platform
- Modes: Single-player, multiplayer

Dustforce is a platform video game developed by Hitbox Team. The game was released in 2012 for Microsoft Windows via Steam in January, and Mac OS X through Steam in May. A Linux port was released as part of the Humble Indie Bundle 6. Capcom published the game for the PlayStation 3, PlayStation Vita, and Xbox 360.

Within the game, the player controls one of four janitors who are attempting to sweep away a world corrupted with dust and filth. The player uses a number of acrobatic skills, such as double jumping and wall jumping to progress through more than 75 levels, cleaning sections covered by leaves and attacking filth-covered creatures to score and progress through the level. The player's performance is ranked based on time and completion, and access to certain levels requires near-perfect runs of earlier levels.

== Gameplay ==
Dustforce is a platform game that has been compared to games such as Super Meat Boy and N+, where fast-response timed actions are considered necessary to complete the game. It is set in a world where filth has corrupted the creatures that live in the area; the four-member Dustforce team of janitors aims to clean up the mess and restore the world. An overworld provides access to more than seventy-five levels, though about half are initially locked to the player.

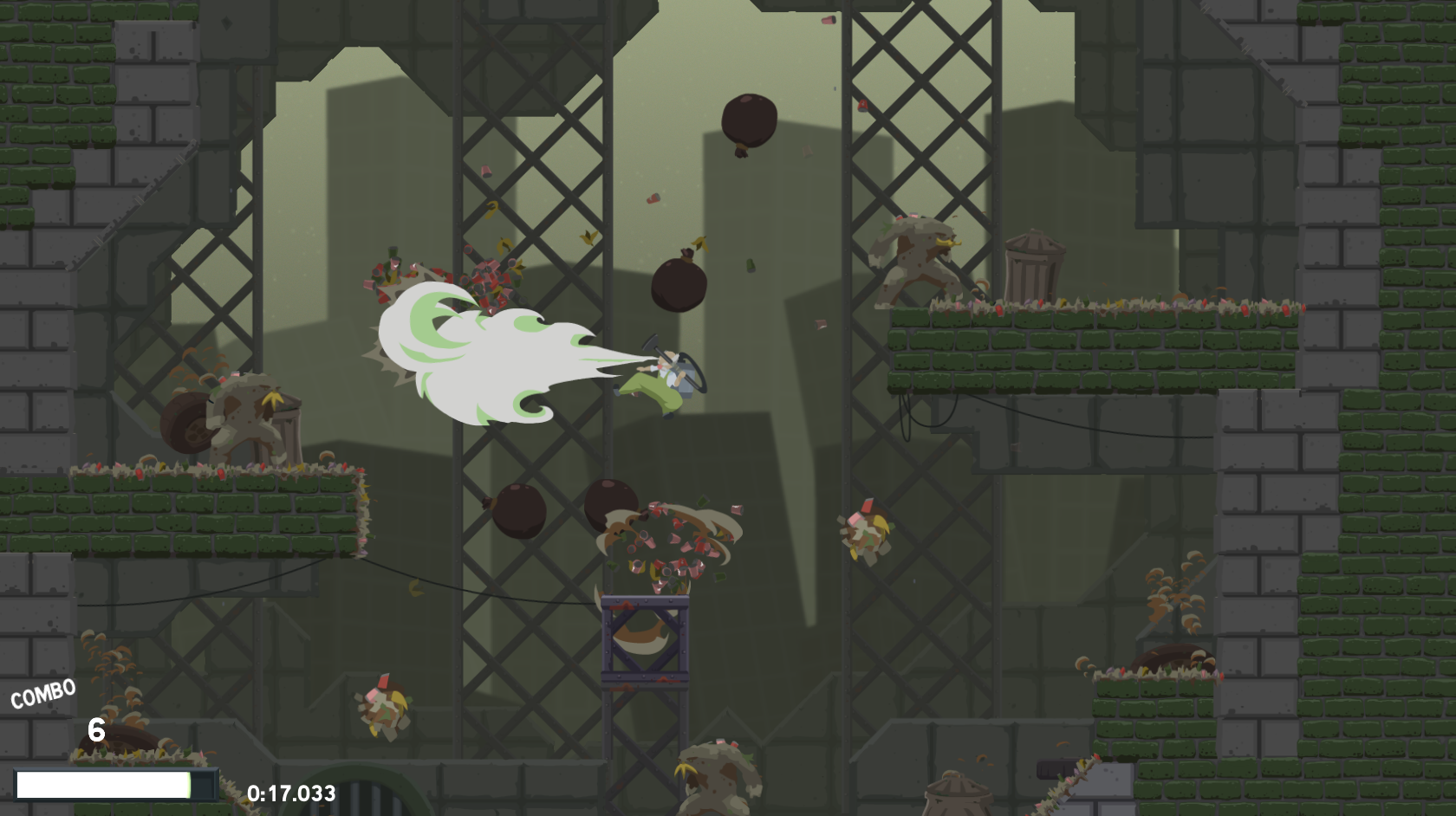
The player controls an agile sweeper as they clear away leaves and defeat creatures across the landscape.

After the player selects a level, they pick one of the four Dustforce members, who all share the same moves but have slightly different statistics, such as jumping height. Within the level, the player must maneuver their character to the end goal using acrobatic tricks such as double jumps, wall jumps, mid-air dashes, and clinging to the ceiling. Along the way, the character will automatically sweep up any debris on the walls or floors. The player can also initiate regular and super-attacks against filth-covered creatures to restore them to normal. The end goal of a level typically requires reaching a final area and defeating foes waiting there. Should the character run into any hazards such as pits or spikes on the level, the player will have to resume the run from a previous checkpoint.

Upon completing a level, the player is ranked based on "finesse" and completion. Finesse is determined by the combo meter, which is reset if the player takes a hit or proceeds too slowly, and completion is determined by the amount of debris and enemies cleaned. The ratings, evaluated separately, are based on a letter-grade scale, with "D" through "A" reflecting increasingly better performances, and an "S" grade, representing a perfect combo, or full completion. Completing a level with an "S" grade in both finesse and completion provides the player with one of three colored keys to unlock certain levels in the overworld.

The player is also rated on a scoring system and ranked on a global leaderboard. The player scores a fixed number of points for every patch of filth that is cleaned up multiplied by their current combo meter, and increases their current combo meter by 1. The combo meter only stays active for a short period of time, but resets for each patch cleaned up; thus by hitting many patches in a row quickly, the player can build up the combo multiplier and drastically increase their score. Player replays are stored online with the leaderboards, allowing other players to review how top scorers were able to complete various levels. The PlayStation 3 version will include the ability to save and share level replays to YouTube, while this, the Vita, and Xbox 360 version will include the ability to save replays locally.

Dustforce includes a four-player local multiplayer mode including variants such as Survival and King of the Hill modes, where players scale the level and fight against other players towards victory. Players can act as the janitors, cleaning up filth, while the other players lay down filth on clean patches of the level.

A level editor for both single player and multiplayer maps was released as part of a patch for the Windows version of the game and the debut of the Mac OS X version. Levels are shared through a website created by Hitbox Team. The PlayStation and Xbox versions includes 150 user-generated level as voted on by players.

== Development ==
The Dustforce team race through this gameplay trailer sweeping up the filth from the world.

Designer Woodley Nye came up with the idea one day while sweeping a pile of leaves. The team was working on another game at the time but switched to Dustforce when they heard about the Indiepub contest. In designing the game Nye wanted to create an acrobatic 2D platformer. He credits the games N and Nikujin as inspirations for the project. Hitbox has also stated that the game Super Smash Bros. Melee was an influence to the team citing its easy pick up and play approach while still maintaining a level of depth for experienced players. In selecting the art style Nye opted for a simplistic style that would showcase the various frames of animation. He has cited Dragon Ball Z as an influence in terms of design aesthetic stating that "they have great poses and also good shapes".

Dustforce won the $100,000 Grand Prize at indiePub Games' Third Independent Game Developers Competition at the 2010 Game Developers Conference Online. The money was used by the four-person Hitbox team to develop the game over about one and a half years.

After about a year of its successful release on Microsoft Windows, Capcom talked to Hitbox about porting the title to consoles. Capcom used the localization team, QLOC to support the transition to console and managing features like leaderboards and replay saving. The console version includes 150 user-created levels from the Windows version as voted on by players.

Dustforce was released on 17 January 2012.

=== DX update ===
A free update to Dustforce, Dustforce DX, was available to all owners of the base game in October 2014. The DX update added 109 community maps accessible through an in-game console, a new music track by Lifeformed, and support for Steam trading cards. The update also included changes designed to make the game friendlier to newer players. The single tutorial was broken into 3 separate maps, 16 easier levels were added, and the 4 world hubs were consolidated into a single area. The overworld redesign makes it more difficult to reach the harder levels. According to Hitbox developer Woodley Nye, the redesign "helps in two ways: it keeps new players away from levels they aren't ready for yet, and it serves as a teaching tool for more advanced techniques that are required in the tougher levels".

== Reception ==
Reception

Aggregate scores
Aggregator	Score
GameRankings	82%
Metacritic	80/100

Review scores
Publication	Score
Eurogamer	8/10
GameSpot	7.5/10
GameSpy	4.5/5
IGN	8.0/10
PC Gamer (US)	90/100

Dustforce was generally well received by critics, praised for its demanding gameplay, online leaderboard features, graphics, and soundtrack. Kyle Orland of Ars Technica, was pleased with the difficulty of the game even after facing levels he could not complete, and considered Dustforce as "a game that's not content to let you be content with yourself, and for that it's definitely worth playing". Marsh Davies of Eurogamer considered that once a player can work their way through a level with perfect completion, "it's hard not to admire the pat precision of the controls or deny the transcendent joy of a high-ranking run". The use of reviewing online replays was highly praised to help players that were stumbling with the game. IGN's Anthony Gallegos considered the replays to be not only "awesome and humbling" to review, but also aiding in teaching the player of new techniques. Several noted that Dustforce is the type of game that a player may get frustrated with quickly after replaying levels over and over to get the "S" grades, but this emotion is calmed by the game's graphics and music. PC Gamer's Lucas Sullivan considered that the combination of the "soothing, ethereal background music" and "fluid animations and beautifully stylized character designs" provided a zen-like meditative setting for the player to practice within. Nathan Grayson of GameSpy considered that "the whole audio-visual package colludes to create a strikingly powerful soothing effect" that contrasts the tight demands of the gameplay.

Some reviewers noted that the game fails to fully explain some of its features through the simplistic menus. There is no immediate information about the differences between the characters when selecting one prior to a level, and the multiplayer mode is not well explained. Others noted that the multiplayer mode felt like an add-on, and without online connectivity, would likely not be a feature many gamers would play. Although the game defaults to the use of keyboard controls, several found these to be a hindrance and switched to a gamepad, which had to be configured manually. Some reviewers also noted that the game has some performance issues based on its initial release.

Sales of the game were boosted by both being featured in a mid-week Steam promotion in May 2012, its inclusion in the Humble Bundle, and further discounts during 2012 holiday season sales. Hitbox states that the team directly earned US$ 489,000 after one year of sales, which will be used to fund development of their next game, Spire.
