= Remnants of Naezith =

2018 video game

- Developer: Tolga Ay
- Publisher: Tolga Ay
- Programmer: Tolga Ay
- Artists: Teemu Siiki; Darya Kozhemyakina; Maks Kneht; Erek Rabang
- Composer: PronomicalArtist
- Platforms: Microsoft Windows; macOS; Linux
- Release: February 5, 2018
- Genre: Platform
- Modes: Single-player; Speedrun; Leaderboards

Remnants of Naezith is a platform video game developed by a Turkish video game developer Tolga Ay. Remnants of Naezith was released in February 2018 on Steam for Microsoft Windows, macOS, and Linux .

== Gameplay ==
Remnants of Naezith is a platform game in which the player controls an adventurer named Kayra, who has abilities which were granted by a dead dragon named Naezith.

Kayra is gifted with two grappling hooks, that are connected to his hands with lightning beams. These grappling hooks can be attached to many surfaces and increase momentum with every successful swing. Kayra can jump off from ground and walls. If he jumps during the dash, the jump becomes twice as high as a normal jump, known as a dash jump. The player character has a limited amount of energy to perform dashes in the game, with energy regenerating as time progresses. The energy refill rate increases if the player is stationary.

Whenever Kayra is in danger, he is saved from death by Naezith, who teleports him to the last checkpoint.

An online leaderboard shows scores worldwide. Through this, the player also has access to other players' performances. Remnants also features a level editor, which allows the players to create their own levels and publish them for other players to play.

== Plot ==
Legends tell of a mighty thunder dragon called Naezith who once roamed the lands. It was said that after his death, remnants of the dragon's body that still held immense power were slowly dispersed far and wide across the world by natural events. Although dead, Naezith's soul didn't want to share the power he still considered his own; and so his soul remained seeking a way to purge the remnants of his magic. A millennium passed and an adventurer named Kayra heard rumors of one of these fabled remnants lying within a cave. Kayra found the cave and began to descend, using a rope and hook to detect the full extent of the cave's depths, but the hook was old and breaks. Kayra fell into what seemed like an endless pit. He awoke, terrified, and found two glowing claws that had magically bonded to his hands. Crazed with terror, he swung his arms wildly to try and shake the claws free, but the spell would not break. Instead, the claw shot forth, planting itself firmly into the stone wall. From the point it was embedded, a glowing beam linked the dispatched claws back to his shaking hands, reminding Kayra of his once sturdy hook. And with a sudden flash, Naezith's soul appeared to Kayra and began to spin a tale of his predicament. Naezith told Kayra that he needed a corporeal body to achieve his ancient plans. Lured by the promise of endless treasure, Kayra accepted the Dragon soul's offer to assume control of his body, to use his powers, and to begin his plot to purge the Remnants of Naezith.

== Development and release ==
The project was started on August 4, 2014. A custom engine was developed for the game using SFML and C++. The game's grappling hook mechanic was inspired by Spider-Man 2 and Worms Armageddon. Remnants of Naezith was designed as a fast-paced speedrunner friendly game. A closed beta for the game was created by speedrunning community members of various games like Dustforce and Super Meat Boy. Many systems were implemented, such as Level Editor for community levels, Leaderboards with replays, Ghosts to race against and Speedrun mode for chapter runs. 80 levels were designed by the community and separated to four chapters. The game was fully released on Steam in February 2018 on Microsoft Windows, macOS, and Linux.

== Reception ==
Reception

Aggregate score
Aggregator	Score
GameRankings	75%

Remnants of Naezith received a score of 7.5 out of ten by Critical Hit Magazine, with the review stating the game was a good game for anyone interested in speedrunning. Darryn Bonthuys from the website said Naezith would be suitable for anyone with a "need for speed."

The Spanish game reviewer Meristation describes the game as "Complex, hard as hell and extremely satisfying to beat" but points out that it requires too much from the players who have never played any games in platform genre, criticising the steep difficulty spike.

The Bosnian website Play-Zine! also states that "the game requires the good amount of precision that can sometimes spoil the impression"
