= List of Wii Wi-Fi Connection games =

This is a list of games on the Wii video game console that use the console's Wi-Fi connection, over external (i.e. Nintendo's) servers. Additionally, the now-defunct WiiConnect24 connection had provided a method for some Wii games to interact online, but rather in a passive method from console to console.

After Nintendo's termination of the free Nintendo Wi-Fi Connection service on May 20, 2014, the majority of the game titles remain virtually playable, but their online connectivity and functionality are rendered defunct, even after some of them were re-released digitally. However, some online games which ran on non-Nintendo servers are still playable online.

Pay & Play is a service by Nintendo that allowed gamers to download new content for already purchased games. To get the updates, however, you'll have to pay for it as the name suggests. Games that feature a Pay & Play service will feature a logo on the boxart, similar to the Nintendo Wi-Fi Connection. The first game to include a Pay & Play service was the WiiWare video game Final Fantasy Crystal Chronicles: My Life as a King.

== Released games ==
See connection type legend

=== Wii ===
Title	Genre	Developer	Publisher	Available	Type	First released	Ref.
007: Quantum of Solace	First-person shooter	Beenox	Activision	^{AUS, EU, NA}	O(4)	2008-10-31	
Animal Crossing: City Folk; Animal Crossing: Let's Go to the City (AUS/EU)	Social Simulation	Nintendo EAD	Nintendo	^{AUS, EU, JP, KO, NA}	O(4), D, WC24, DS	2008-11-16	
Battalion Wars 2	Third-person shooter	Kuju Entertainment	Nintendo	^{AUS, EU, JP, NA}	O(2)	2007-10-29	
The Beatles: Rock Band	Music game	Pi Studios	Electronic Arts	^{AUS, EU, NA}	O(4), P&P, S	2009-09-09	
Blast Works: Build, Trade, Destroy	Side scroller	Budcat Creations	Majesco	^{AUS, EU, NA}	S	2008-7-10	
Bleach: Versus Crusade	Fighting game	Treasure Co. Ltd	Sega	^{JP}	O(2)	2008-12-18	
Bomberman Blast	Action	Hudson Soft	Hudson Soft	^{JP}	O(8), S	2008-09-25	
Boom Blox Bash Party	Physics-based puzzle game	EA Los Angeles	Electronic Arts	^{AUS, EU, NA}	D	2009-05-19	
Call of Duty: Modern Warfare 3	First-person Shooter	Treyarch	Activision	^{AUS, EU, NA}	O(12), S	2011-11-08	
Call of Duty: Black Ops	First-person Shooter	Treyarch	Activision	^{AUS, EU, NA}	O(12), S	2010-11-09	
Call of Duty: Modern Warfare – Reflex Edition	First-person Shooter	Treyarch	Activision	^{AUS, EU, NA}	O(10), S	2009-11-10	
Call of Duty: World at War	First-person Shooter	Treyarch	Activision	^{AUS, EU, NA}	O(8), S	2008-11-11	
Castlevania Judgment	Fighting game	Eighting	Konami	^{AUS, EU, JP, NA}	O(2), DS	2008-11-18	
Champion Jockey: G1 Jockey & Gallop Racer	Alternative sports	Tecmo Koei	Tecmo Koei	^{EU, JP, NA, AU}	P&P	2011-9-2	
The Conduit	First-person shooter	High Voltage Software	Sega	^{AUS, EU, NA}	O(12)	2009-06-23	
The Conduit 2	First-person shooter	High Voltage Software	Sega	^{AUS, EU, NA}	O(12)	2011-04-19	
DJ Hero	Music game	FreeStyleGames, Exient Entertainment	Activision	^{AUS, EU, NA}	O(2),S,P&P	2009-10-27	
DJ Hero 2	Music game	FreeStyleGames	Activision	^{AUS, EU, NA}	O(3),S,P&P	2010-10-19	
Dragon Ball Z: Budokai Tenkaichi 3	Fighting	Spike	Namco Bandai (EU/JP); Atari (AUS/NA)	^{AUS, EU, JP, NA}	O(2), S	2007-10-28	
Dragon Quest Monsters: Battle Road Victory	Card battle	Eighting	Square Enix	^{JP}	O(4), P&P	2010-07-15	
Endless Ocean	Adventure	Arika	Nintendo	^{AUS, EU, JP, NA}	O(2)	2007-08-02	
Endless Ocean 2: Adventures of the Deep	Adventure	Arika	Nintendo	^{AUS, EU, JP, NA}	O(2)	2009-09-17	
Excitebots: Trick Racing	Racing	Monster Games, Nintendo SPD Group No.3	Nintendo	^{JP, NA}	O(6)	2009-04-20	
Final Fantasy Crystal Chronicles: Echoes of Time	Action RPG	Square Enix	Square Enix	^{AUS, EU, JP, NA}	O(4), DS	2009-03-24	
Final Fantasy Fables: Chocobo's Dungeon	Role-playing video game	h.a.n.d.	Square Enix	^{AUS, EU, JP, NA}	O(2)	2007-12-13	
FIFA 08	Sports(Soccer)	EA Canada	EA Sports	^{AUS, EU, JP, NA}	O(2)	2007-9-27	
FIFA 09 All-Play	Sports(Soccer)	Sumo Digital	EA Sports	^{AUS, EU, JP, NA}	O(4), S	2008-10-02	
FIFA 10	Sports(Soccer)	Sumo Digital	EA Sports	^{AUS, EU, JP, NA}	O(4), S	2009-10-02	
FIFA 11	Sports(Soccer)	EA Canada	EA Sports	^{AUS, EU, JP, NA}	O(4), S	2010-9-28	
Fortune Street	Board game	Marvelous	Nintendo	^{AUS, EU, JP, NA}	O(4), S	2011-12-01	
Geometry Wars: Galaxies	Multidirectional shooter	Kuju/Bizarre	Sierra	^{NA}	S	2007-23-11	
Ghost Squad	Rail shooter	Polygon Magic	Sega	^{AUS, EU, JP, NA}	S	2007-10-23	
Grand Slam Tennis	Sports (Tennis)	EA Canada	EA Sports	^{AUS, EU, NA}	O(2), S	2009-06-08	
Green Day: Rock Band	Rhythm	Harmonix	MTV Games	^{NA, EU, AUS}	P&P	2010-06-08	
GoldenEye 007	First-person shooter	Eurocom	Activision	^{AUS, EU, JP, NA}	?	2010-11-2	
GTI Club Supermini Festa!	Racing game	Konami	Konami	^{EU, NA}	O(4)	2010-03-16	
Guinness World Records: The Videogame	Party game	TT Fusion	Warner Bros. Interactive Entertainment	^{AUS, EU, NA}	S	2008-11-07	
Guitar Hero: Aerosmith	Music game	Vicarious Visions	Activision	^{AUS, EU, NA}	O(2), S	2008-06-29	
Guitar Hero: Metallica	Music game	Budcat Creations	Activision	^{AUS, EU, NA}	O(4), S, +	2009-03-29	
Guitar Hero: Smash Hits	Music game	Beenox	Activision/RedOctane	^{AUS, EU, NA}	O(4), S	2009-06-16	
Guitar Hero III: Legends of Rock	Music game	Vicarious Visions	Activision	^{AUS, EU, NA}	O(2), S	2007-10-28	
Guitar Hero World Tour	Music game	Vicarious Visions	Activision	^{AUS, EU, NA}	O(8), P&P, S, +	2008-10-26	
Guitar Hero 5	Music game	Vicarious Visions	Activision	^{AUS, EU, NA}	O(8), P&P, S, DS, +	2009-08-14	
Guitar Hero: Warriors of Rock	Music game	Vicarious Visions	Activision	^{AUS, EU, NA}	O(8), P&P, S, DS, +	2010-09-28	
Hooked! Real Motion Fishing	Fishing	SIMS	Arc System Works (Japan); Aksys Games, Inc (U.S)	^{JP, NA}	O(4)	2007-09-27	
Jikkyou Powerful Pro Yakyuu Wii Ketteiban	Sports (Baseball)	Konami	Konami	^{JP}	?	?	
Jissen Pachi-Slot Pachinko Hisshôhô! Hokuto no Ken	Pachinko	Sammy	SEGA	^{JP}	?	2007-05-24	
Just Dance 2	Rhythm game	Ubisoft subsidiaries (Paris, Milan)	Ubisoft	^{AUS, EU, NA}	P&P	2010-10-12	
Just Dance 3	Rhythm game	Ubisoft subsidiaries (Paris)	Ubisoft	^{AUS, EU, NA}	P&P	2011-10-07	
Just Dance 4	Rhythm game	Ubisoft subsidiaries (Milan, Paris, Reflections, Bucharest, Pune)	Ubisoft	^{AUS, EU, NA}	P&P	2012-10-02	
Just Dance 2014	Rhythm game	Ubisoft subsidiaries (Paris, Milan, Reflections, Bucharest, Pune, Montpellier, Barcelona)	Ubisoft	^{AUS, EU, NA}	P&P, O, S	2013-10-01	
Just Dance 2015	Rhythm game	Ubisoft subsidiaries (Paris, Milan, Reflections, Pune, Bucharest)	Ubisoft	^{AUS, EU, NA}	P&P, O, S	2014-10-21	
Just Dance 2016	Rhythm game	Ubisoft subsidiaries (Paris, Milan, Pune)	Ubisoft	^{AUS, EU, NA}	O, S	2015-10-20	
Just Dance 2017	Rhythm game	Ubisoft subsidiaries (Paris, Pune)	Ubisoft	^{AUS, EU, NA}	O, S	2016-10-25	
Just Dance 2018	Rhythm game	Ubisoft subsidiaries (Paris, Pune, Shanghai, Bucharest, Montreal)	Ubisoft	^{AUS, EU, NA}	O, S	2017-10-24	
Karaoke Joysound Wii	Music	Hudson	Hudson	^{JP}	O, D, S, +	2008-12-18	
Katekyoo Hitman Reborn! Kindan no Yami no Delta	Fighting	Marvelous Entertainment	Nintendo	^{JP}	O(2)	2008-11-20	
The Last Story	Action RPG	Mistwalker, AQ Interactive	Nintendo; Xseed Games (NA)	^{AUS, EU, JP, NA}	O(6)	2011-01-27	
Madden NFL 08	Sports (American football)	EA Tiburon	EA Sports	^{AUS, EU, NA}	O(2), S	2007-08-14	
Madden NFL 09 All-Play	Sports (American football)	EA Tiburon	EA Sports	^{AUS, EU, NA}	O(2), S	2008-08-12	
Madden NFL 10	Sports (American Football)	EA Tiburon	EA Sports	^{AUS, EU, NA}	O(2), S	2009-09-01	
Mario Kart Wii	Racing	Nintendo EAD	Nintendo	^{AUS, EU, JP, KO, NA}	O(12), D, S	2008-04-10	
Mario & Sonic at the London 2012 Olympic Games	Sports	Sega Sports R&D, Racjin	Nintendo, (JP) Sega	^{AUS, EU, JP, NA}	S, WC24	2011-11-15	
Mario & Sonic at the Olympic Games	Sports	Sega Japan, Sega Sports	Nintendo, (JP) Sega	^{AUS, EU, JP, NA}	S	2007-11-06	
Mario & Sonic at the Olympic Winter Games	Sports	Sonic Team, Racjin	Nintendo, (JP) Sega	^{AUS, EU, JP, NA}	S, WC24	2009-10-13	
Mario Strikers Charged	Sports (football)	Next Level Games	Nintendo	^{AUS, EU, JP, KO, NA}	O(4), S	2007-05-25	
Medal of Honor: Heroes 2	First-person shooter	EA Canada	Electronic Arts	^{AUS, EU, JP, NA}	O(32), S	2007-11-13	
Momotarou Dentetsu 16	Board game	Hudson Soft	Hudson Soft	^{JP}	?	?	
Monster Hunter Tri	Action RPG	Capcom Production Studio 1	Capcom	^{AUS, EU, JP, NA}	O(4)	2009-08-01	
Monster Lab	Action RPG	Backbone Entertainment	Eidos Interactive	^{EU, NA}	O	2008-11-04	
MX vs. ATV: Untamed	Racing	Incinerator Studios	THQ	^{AUS, EU, NA}	O(6)	2008-02-18 (Wii version)	
Naruto Shippuden Clash of Ninja Revolution 3	Fighting game	Eighting	Tomy	^{EU, NA}	O(2)	2009-11-17	
NBA Live 08	Sports (Basketball)	HB Studios	Electronic Arts	^{AUS, EU, NA}	O(2), S	2007-10-02	
NBA Live 09 All-Play	Sports (Basketball)	HB Studios	Electronic Arts	^{AUS, EU, NA}	O(8), S	2008-10-07	
NHL 2K10	Sports (Hockey)	Visual Concepts	2K Sports	^{EU, NA}	O(4)	2009-09-15	
NHL 2K11	Sports (Hockey)	Visual Concepts	2K Sports	^{EU, NA}	O(4)	2010-08-24	
Nights: Journey of Dreams	Action-adventure	Sonic Team, Sega Studios USA	Sega	^{AUS, EU, JP, NA}	O(2), +	2007-12-13	
Nitrobike	Racing	Left Field Productions	Ubisoft	^{AUS, EU, JP, NA}	O(6)	2008-01-15	
Octomania	Puzzle	Compile Heart	Conspiracy Entertainment	^{JP, NA}	O(4)	2007-08-23	
Pokémon Battle Revolution	Role-playing video game	Genius Sonority	Nintendo/The Pokémon Company	^{AUS, EU, JP, NA}	O(2), DS	2006-12-14	
Pro Evolution Soccer 2008	Sports(Soccer)	Konami	Konami	^{AUS, EU, JP, NA}	O(2)	2008-03-18	
Pro Evolution Soccer 2009	Sports(Soccer)	Konami	Konami	^{AUS, EU, JP, NA}	O(2)	2009-03-17	
Pro Evolution Soccer 2010	Sports(Soccer)	Konami	Konami	^{AUS, EU, JP, NA}	O(2)	2009-10-23	
Pro Evolution Soccer 2011	Sports(Soccer)	Konami	Konami	^{AUS, EU, JP, NA}	O(2)	2010-09-30	
Rabbids Go Home	Action-adventure	Ubisoft Montpellier	Ubisoft	^{AUS, EU, JP, NA}	S,+	2009-11-01	
Rayman Raving Rabbids 2	Party	Ubisoft Paris	Ubisoft	^{AUS, EU, JP, NA}	S	2007-11-13	
Rayman Raving Rabbids: TV Party	Party	Ubisoft Paris	Ubisoft	^{AUS, EU, JP, KO, NA}	S,+	2008-11-13	
Rock Band 2	Music game	Pi Studios	Electronic Arts	^{NA}	O(4), P&P, S	2008-12-18	
Rock Band 3	Music game	Backbone Entertainment	MTV Games/Electronic Arts	^{AUS, EU, NA}	P&P	2010-10-26	
Samba De Amigo	Music game	Gearbox Software	Sega	^{AUS, EU, JP, NA}	O(2), P&P, S	2008-09-23	
Sega Arcade Hits Pack: Gunblade NY & LA Machineguns	Rail shooter	Sega	Sega	^{AU, EU, NA}	S	2010-08-26	
Sin & Punishment: Star Successor	Rail Shooter	Treasure	Nintendo	^{AUS, EU, JP, NA}	S	2010-07-27	
SimCity Creator	City-building/Simulation	Maxis	EA	^{AUS, EU, NA}	S, +	2008-09-19	
Simple Wii series Vol. 1: The Minna de Kaato Reesu	Racing	D3 Publisher	D3 Publisher	^{JP}	?	?	
Simple Wii series Vol. 2: The Minna de Basu Duri Taikai	Fishing	D3 Publisher	D3 Publisher	^{JP}	?	?	
Simple Wii series Vol. 3: The Casino Party	Casino	D3 Publisher	D3 Publisher	^{JP}	?	?	
Simple Wii series Vol. 4: The Shooting Action	Shooter	D3 Publisher	D3 Publisher	^{JP}	?	?	
Simple Wii series Vol. 5: The Burokku Kuzushi	Puzzle / Music	D3 Publisher	D3 Publisher	^{JP}	?	?	
Simple Wii series Vol. 6: Waiwai Konbatto	Action	D3 Publisher	D3 Publisher	^{JP}	?	?	
Sonic & Sega All-Stars Racing	Racing	Sumo Digital	Sega	^{AUS, EU, NA}	O (12), +	2010-02-23	
Sonic Colors	Platforming	Sonic Team	Sega	^{AUS, EU, JP, NA}	O(4), +	2010-11-11	
Sonic Riders: Zero Gravity	Racing	Sonic Team	Sega	^{AUS, EU, JP, NA}	S	2008-01-08	
Sonic and the Black Knight	Platform	Sonic Team	Sega	^{AUS, EU, JP, NA}	S, +	2009-03-03	
Super Smash Bros. Brawl	Fighting	Sora Ltd.	Nintendo	^{AUS, EU, JP, KO, NA}	O(4), +	2008-01-31	
Tatsunoko vs. Capcom: Ultimate All-Stars	Fighting game	Eighting	Capcom	^{AUS, EU, JP, NA}	O(2)	2010-01-26	
Teenage Mutant Ninja Turtles: Smash-Up	Fighting game	Game Arts	Ubisoft	^{AUS, EU, NA}	O(4)	2009-09-22	
Tetris Party Deluxe	Puzzle game	Blue Planet Software	Tetris Online Inc.	^{AUS, EU, JP, NA}	O(4), S	2010-07-01	
Tiger Woods PGA Tour 09 All-Play	Sports(Golf)	EA Tiburon	EA Sports	^{AUS, EU, NA}	O(4), S, +	2008-08-26	
Tiger Woods PGA Tour 10	Sports (Golf)	EA Tiburon	EA Sports	^{AUS, EU, NA}	O(4), S, +	2009-06-08	
Trauma Center: New Blood	Medical simulation	Atlus	Atlus; Nintendo (AUS/EU)	^{AUS, EU, JP, NA}	S	2007-11-20	
Trackmania Wii	Racing	Firebrand Games	Ubisoft	?	?	?	
Ultimate Band	Music video game	Fall Line Studios	Disney Interactive Studios	^{AUS, EU, NA}	O(2)	2008-11-25	
Valhalla Knights: Eldar Saga	Action RPG	K2	Xseed Games/Marvelous	^{EU, JP, NA}	O(2)	2009-09-29	
Virtua Tennis 2009	Sports	Sumo Digital	Sega	^{AUS, EU, NA}	O	2009-05-19	
We Love Golf!	Sports (Golf)	Camelot Software Planning	Capcom	^{AUS, EU, NA}	O(2)	2008-07-04	
Wi-Fi Taiou: Gensen Table Game Wii	Board game	Hudson	Hudson	^{JP}	O(2)	2008-05-22	
Wii Chess	Board game	Nintendo SPD	Nintendo	^{EU}	O(2)	2008-01-18	
Wii Music	Music game	Nintendo EAD	Nintendo	^{AUS, EU, JP, NA}	+	2008-10-16	
WWE SmackDown vs. Raw 2009	Professional wrestling	Yuke's	THQ	^{AUS, EU, NA}	O, D	2008-11-06	
Zangeki no Reginleiv	Action-adventure game / Third-person shooter	Sandlot	Nintendo	^{JP}	O(4)	2010-02-10	

=== WiiWare ===
Title	Genre	Developer	Available	Type	First released	Ref.
Alien Crush Returns	Pinball	Hudson	^{EU, JP, NA}	O(4), S	2008-08-26	
Bomberman Blast (WiiWare version)	Puzzle	Hudson	^{AUS, EU, JP, NA}	O(8)	2008-09-12	
Bubble Bobble Plus!	Arcade	Taito	^{EU, JP}	D	2009-04-10	
Chess Challenge!!	Traditional game	Digital Leisure	^{EU, NA}	O(5)	2010-05-10	
Crystal Defenders R1/R2	Tower defense	Square Enix	^{EU, JP, NA}	S	2009-01-27	
Diner Dash	Strategy	PlayFirst	^{AUS, EU, JP, NA}	O(4)	2010-02-16	
Dr. Mario Online Rx	Puzzle	Nintendo	^{AUS, EU, JP, NA}	O(2), S	2008-03-25	
Evasive Space	Action game	High Voltage Software	^{NA}	O(4), S	2009-02-16	
Excitebike: World Rally	Racing game	Nintendo	^{EU, NA}	O, S, +	Nov 9, 2009	
Final Fantasy Crystal Chronicles: My Life as a King	City-building / RPG	Square Enix	^{AUS, EU, JP, NA}	P&P	2008-03-25	
Gradius ReBirth	Shoot 'em up	Konami	^{JP, NA}	S	2009-03-09	
High Voltage Hot Rod Show	Racing game	High Voltage Software	^{NA}	S	2009-01-19	
Karaoke Joysound Wii	Music	Hudson	^{JP}	O, D, S, +	2009-07-28	
Kotoba no Puzzle: Mojipittan	Puzzle	Namco	^{JP}	O, D	2008-03-25	
Lonpos	Puzzle	Genki	^{EU, JP, NA}	P&P	2008-03-25	
Major League Eating: The Game	Other	Mastiff	^{JP, NA}	O, S	2008-07-14	
Mart Racer	Racing game	Joju Games	^{NA}	O	2009-09-14	
Mega Man 9	Action / Platform	Capcom	^{AUS, EU, JP, NA}	P&P, S	2008-09-22	
Mega Man 10	Action / Platform	Capcom	^{AUS, EU, JP, NA}	P&P, S	2010-03-01	
Military Madness: Nectaris	Turn-based strategy	Hudson Soft	^{JP, NA, EU}	O(4)	2010-02-09	
Oekaki Logic	Puzzle	G-Mode	^{JP}	D	2008-05-27	
Onslaught	First-person shooter	Hudson	^{EU, JP, NA}	O	2009-2-13	
Overturn	Action	Studio Zan	^{EU, JP}	O(4)	2008-12-08	
Pool Revolution: Cue Sports	Cue sports	Hudson Soft	^{AUS, EU, JP, NA}	O(4)	2008-11-18	
Pop	Puzzle	Nnooo	^{AUS, EU, JP, NA}	S	2008-05-12	
Pit Crew Panic!	Puzzle	Hudson Soft	^{EU, JP}	S	2008-12-01	
Robocalypse: Beaver Defense	Tower defense	Vogster Entertainment	^{EU, NA}	O(4)	2010-05-31	
Snowboard Riot	Shoot 'em up	Hudson Soft	^{EU, JP, NA}	O(2)	2009-02-09	
Sonic the Hedgehog 4: Episode I	Platform game	Sonic Team, Dimps	^{AUS, EU, JP, NA}	D	2010-10-11	
Space Invaders Get Even	Shoot 'em up	Taito	^{EU, JP, NA}	S	2008-08-26	
SPOGS Racing	Racing	Pronto Games	^{EU, NA}	D	2008-07-07	
Star Soldier R	Shooter	Hudson Soft	^{AUS, EU, JP, NA}	S	2008-05-12	
Tetris Party	Puzzle	Blue Planet Software	^{AUS, EU, JP, NA}	O(6), S	2008-10-14	
Texas Hold'em Poker	Card game	Gameloft	^{US, UK}	O(2-4), S, D	2009-09-14	
Texas Hold'em Tournament	Card game	Digital Leisure	^{AUS, EU, NA}	O(5)	2009-03-27	
Tomena Sanner	Action	Konami	^{AUS, EU, JP, NA}	S		
TV Show King 2	Party	Gameloft	^{AUS, EU, NA}	O(4), S, D		
Uno	Card game	Gameloft	^{US, UK}	O(4-6), S		
Tsuushin Taikyoku: World Chess	Board game	Nintendo	^{JP}	O(2)	2008-09-30	
Water Warfare	First-person Shooter	Hudson	^{AUS, EU, JP, NA}	O(8)	2009-06-23	
Yakuman Wii	Party	Nintendo	^{JP}	D	2008-05-20	

== Unreleased games ==
=== Wii ===
Title	Genre	Developer	Publisher	Type	Expected release	Ref.
The Grinder	First-person Shooter	High Voltage Software	TBA	O(4)	Halloween 2011	

== Legend ==
Type Code	Explanation
D	Free Downloadable Content (DLC)
DS	Interacts with the Nintendo DS version of the game.
O(n)	Online play for n players total.
S	Score sharing/Laddering.
P&P	Pay & Play DLC
WC24	WiiConnect24 provides other functions, for ex. Weather Conditions in game from Forecast Channel, DLC (only in Animal Crossing for Wii) and sending data to other Wii via Wii Mail
+	Additional functionality available, check the game specific page for more information.

Availability	Explanation
^{AUS}	Australasia
^{EU}	European Union
^{JP}	Japan
^{KO}	Republic of Korea
^{NA}	North America

== See also ==
- Nintendo Wi-Fi Connection
- List of Wii games
- List of WiiWare games
- List of Wii games using WiiConnect24
- List of Nintendo 3DS Wi-Fi Connection games
- List of Nintendo DS Wi-Fi Connection games
- WiiConnect24
- Wii
