= List of Nintendo 3DS Nintendo Network games =

This is a list of Nintendo Network compatible games on the Nintendo 3DS handheld game console. Whilst many titles implemented the use of Nintendo Network service, Nintendo-published titles in particular, other titles are supported by various third-party online services. Most of these titles had online services shut by April 2024.

== Released Nintendo Network compatible 3DS games ==
| Title | Genre | Max Local Multiplayer | Developer | Publisher | Available | First Released | Source |
|---|---|---|---|---|---|---|---|
| 3D Altered Beast | | 2 | | Sega | | | |
| 3D Gunstar Heroes | | 2 | | Sega | | | |
| 3D Streets of Rage | Fighting | 2 | | Sega | en,fr,de,it,es | | |
| 3D Streets of Rage 2 | Fighting | 2 | | Sega | en,fr | | |
| Animal Crossing: New Leaf (Note: Is limited to town-visits.) | Life simulation game | 4 | Nintendo EAD Group No. 2/Monolith Studios | Nintendo | ^{NA} ^{EU} ^{AUS} ^{JAP} ^{KOR} | 2012-11-08 | |
| Battleminerz | Shooter sandbox | 8 | | Wobbly Tooth | | 21.12.2017 | [25] |
| Code of Princess | Action role-playing | | Studio Saizensen | Agatsuma Entertainment/Atlus USA | ^{NA} ^{EU} ^{JAP} | 2012-01-19 | |
| Code Name: S.T.E.A.M. | Turn-based strategy | | Nintendo SPD/Intelligent Systems | Nintendo | ^{NA} ^{EU} ^{JAP} | 2015-03-15 | |
| Daigasso Band Brothers P (Japan only) | | | | | | | |
| Dead or Alive Dimensions | | 2 | | | | | |
| Denpa Men 2 Beyond Waves | | | | | | | |
| Dr. Mario Miracle Cure | Puzzle | 2 | | | | | |
| Dragon Ball Fusions | | | | | | | |
| Dragon Ball Z Extreme Butoden | | | | | | | |
| Dragon Quest X (Japan only) | | | | | | | |
| Fantasy Life | Action role-playing | | Level-5 (company) | Nintendo | ^{NA} ^{EU} ^{JAP} | 2012-12-27 | |
| Fossil Fighters Frontier | | | | | | | |
| Final Fantasy Explorers | | | | | | | |
| Fire Emblem: Fates | | | | | | | |
| Heroes of Ruin | Action role-playing | 4 | n-Space | Square Enix | ^{NA} ^{EU} | 2012-06-15 | |
| Kid Icarus: Uprising | Action | | Project Sora/Sora Ltd. | Nintendo | ^{NA} ^{EU} ^{AUS} ^{JAP} | 2012-03-22 | |
| Kirby Battle Royale | | 4 | | Nintendo | | | |
| The Legend of Zelda: Tri Force Heroes | Action-adventure | 3 | Nintendo EPD/Grezzo | Nintendo | ^{NA} ^{EU} ^{AUS} ^{JAP} | 2015-10-25 | |
| Luigi's Mansion Dark Moon | | 4 | | Nintendo | | | |
| Mario Kart 7 | Racing | 8 | Nintendo EAD/Retro Studios | Nintendo | ^{NA} ^{EU} ^{AUS} | 2011-12-01 | |
| Mario & Sonic at the London 2012 Olympic Games (Ranking only) | Sports/Party | | Sega Sports Japan | Nintendo/Sega | ^{NA} ^{EU} ^{AUS} | 2012-02-09 | |
| Mario & Sonic at the Rio 2016 Olympic Games (Ranking only) | Sports/Party | | Sega Sports Japan | Nintendo/Sega | ^{NA} ^{EU} ^{AUS} | | |
| Mario Sports Superstars | | | | Nintendo | | | |
| Mario Tennis Open | | | | Nintendo | | | |
| Metroid Prime: Federation Force | | 4 | | | | | |
| Monster Hunter 3 Ultimate (Note: The 3DS version of Monster Hunter 3 Ultimate is only Nintendo Network compatible when connected through the Wii U version of the game.) | Action role-playing | | Eighting | Capcom | ^{NA} ^{EU} ^{AUS} ^{JAP} | 2011-12-10 | |
| Monster Hunter 4 Ultimate | Action role-playing | | Capcom | Capcom | ^{NA} ^{EU} ^{AUS} ^{JAP} | 2014-10-11 | |
| Monster Hunter: Generations | | | | | | | |
| Need for Speed: The Run | Racing/Sports | | EA Black Box/Firebrand Games | Electronic Arts/Sega | ^{NA} ^{EU} ^{AUS} | 2011-11-15 | |
| New Super Mario Bros. 2 (Note: Does include co-op play. Only locally.) | Platforming | 2 | Nintendo EAD Group No. 4 | Nintendo | ^{NA} ^{EU} ^{AUS} ^{JAP} ^{KOR} | 2012-11-08 | |
| PES 2012 3D | Sports | | Konami | Konami/MicroByte | ^{NA} ^{EU} ^{AUS} | 2012-01-30 | |
| PES 2013 | | | | | | | |
| Pokémon X and Y | RPG | | Game Freak | Nintendo/The Pokémon Company | ^{NA} ^{EU} ^{AUS} ^{JAP} | 2013-10-12 | |
| Pokémon Omega Ruby and Alpha Sapphire | RPG | | Game Freak | Nintendo/The Pokémon Company | ^{NA} ^{EU} ^{AUS} ^{JAP} | 2014-11-28 | |
| Pokémon Sun and Moon | RPG | | Game Freak | Nintendo/The Pokémon Company | ^{NA} ^{EU} ^{AUS} ^{JAP} | 2016-11-18 | |
| Puyo Puyo Tetris | Puzzle | 2 | | Sega | ^{JAP} | | |
| Puzzle & Dragons Z + Puzzle & Dragons: Super Mario Bros. Edition | Puzzle | 2 | | Nintendo | | | |
| Resident Evil: Revelations | Action/Adventure | | | | | | |
| Resident Evil: The Mercenaries 3D | Action/Adventure | | Capcom/Tose | Capcom | ^{NA} ^{EU} ^{AUS} | 2011-06-02 | |
| Ridge Racer 3D | Racing/Sports | | | Namco Bandai Games | | | |
| Sonic Generations | Action-adventure/Platformers | | Dimps/Sega | Sega | ^{NA} ^{EU} ^{AUS} | 2011-11-22 | |
| Sonic Lost World | Action-adventure/Platformers | | | | | | |
| Steel Diver: Sub Wars | Simulation | | Nintendo EAD Group No. 5/Vitei | Sega | ^{NA} ^{EU} ^{AUS} ^{JAP} | 2014-2-13 | |
| Story of Seasons | | | | | | | |
| Style Savvy: Trendsetters | | | | | | | |
| Sonic All Stars Racing Transformed | | | | | | | |
| Super Smash Bros. for Nintendo 3DS | Fighting | | Sora Ltd. | Nintendo/Namco Bandai | ^{NA} ^{EU} ^{AUS} ^{JAP} | 2014-10-03 | |
| Super Street Fighter IV 3D Edition | Fighting | 2 | Capcom/Dimps | Capcom/Nintendo | ^{NA} ^{EU} ^{AUS} | 2011-02-26 | |
| Tekken 3D: Prime Edition | Fighting | 2 | Namco Bandai Games/Arika | Namco Bandai Games | ^{NA} ^{EU} ^{AUS} | 2012-02-14 | |
| Tetris Axis | Puzzle | 8 | HUDSON SOFT | Nintendo | ^{NA} ^{EU} ^{AUS} | 2011-10-02 | |
| Tetris Ultimate | Puzzle | | | | | | |
| Theatrhythm Final Fantasy Curtain Call | | | | | | | |
| Yokai Watch | | | | | | | |
| Yokai Watch 2 | | | | | | | |
| Yokai Watch 3 (Japan Only) | | | | | | | |

== See also ==
- List of Nintendo 3DS games
- List of Nintendo 3DS Download Software
- List of DSiWare games and applications
- List of Nintendo DS Wi-Fi Connection games
- List of Wii Wi-Fi Connection games
