= N++ =

2015 video game

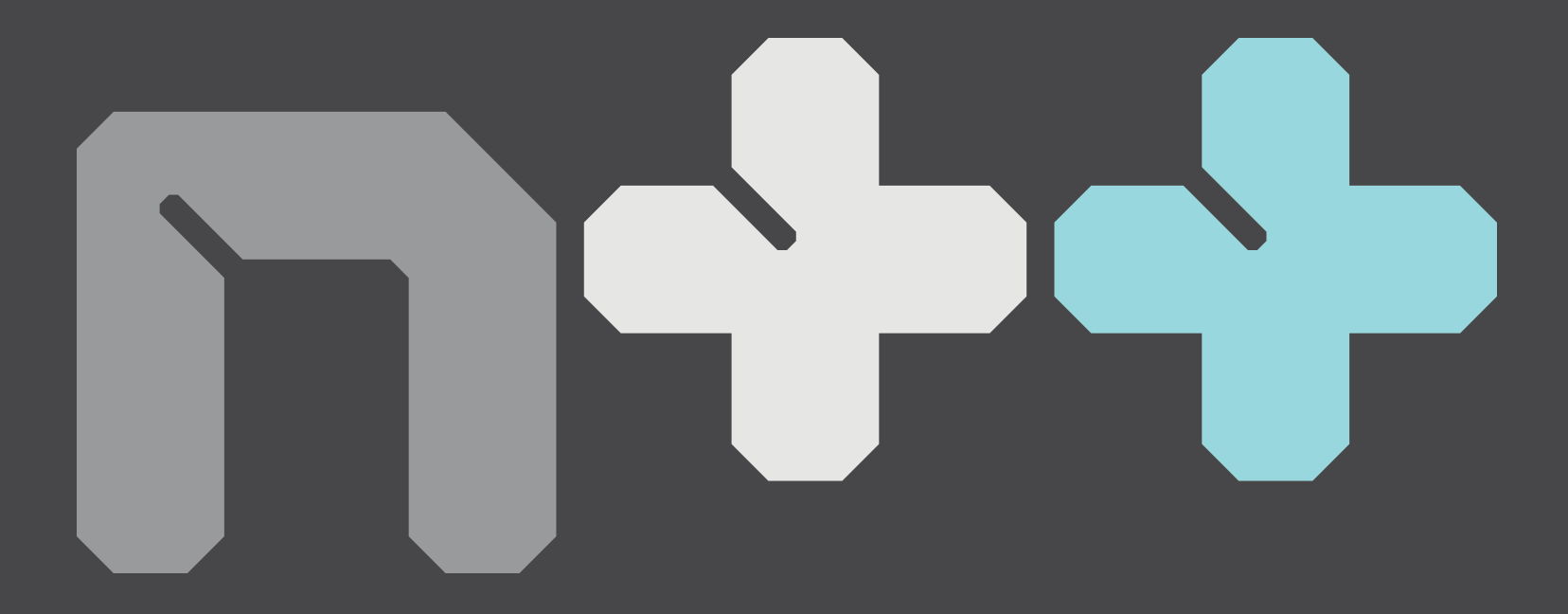
- Developer: Metanet Software
- Publisher: Metanet Software
- Designers: Mare Sheppard; Raigan Burns
- Programmers: Tatham Johnson; Aaron Melcher; Shawn McGrath
- Artists: Mare Sheppard; Raigan Burns; MASA
- Series: N
- Platforms: PlayStation 4; Microsoft Windows; Xbox One; OS X; Linux; Nintendo Switch
- Release: PlayStation 4: NA: July 28, 2015; EU: July 29, 2015; JP: June 27, 2019; Microsoft Windows: WW: August 25, 2016; Xbox One: WW: October 4, 2017; OS X: WW: December 26, 2016; Nintendo Switch: WW: May 24, 2018; Linux: WW: May 31, 2018
- Genre: Platform
- Modes: Single-player, multiplayer

N++ is a platform video game developed and published by Metanet Software. It is the third installment of the N franchise, which started with the Adobe Flash game N. It is the sequel to N+. The game was initially released for the PlayStation 4 on July 28, 2015, in North America, and July 29, 2015, in Europe, and was later released for the Microsoft Windows and macOS operating systems on August 25, 2016, and December 26, 2016, respectively. The Xbox One version was released on October 4, 2017. The Linux version of the game was released on May 31, 2018. An expansion to the game, entitled N++ Ultimate Edition, was released for the Windows version of the game on April 21, 2017, as a free update to the game. N++ Ultimate Edition was released for the Nintendo Switch on May 24, 2018. Another free expansion, TEN++, was released on October 16, 2025 to celebrate the game's tenth anniversary. A multiplayer-centric sequel, N Plus Infinity Times Two, is set to be released in 2027.

== Gameplay ==
Gameplay consists of platform-style jumping, dodging, climbing and rebounding from walls, collecting gold pieces to extend the time allotted to complete each level. Momentum serves a big role in the player movement, with the jump height being dependent on the player speed and the angle of the platform. To complete a level, the player must navigate towards the exit button and arrive at the exit while avoiding a myriad of enemies and obstacles along the way. Levels are grouped in "episodes", each containing five levels.

A level editor is available, along with the ability to play online levels created and uploaded by other players.

== Release ==
N++ was announced at Gamescom 2013 during Sony's PlayStation media briefing as the sequel to the game N+. The game was released on PlayStation 4 in North America on July 28, 2015, and July 29 in Europe as a timed exclusive. In February 2016, Metanet developer Raigan Burns stated that they were working to bringing the title to the Steam selling website for personal computers. The Microsoft Windows version was released on August 25, 2016, with the OS X version following on December 26, 2016. A version for Linux was announced, and released on May 31, 2018.

An expansion, entitled N++ Ultimate Edition, was announced on December 5, 2016, and was reported to nearly double the size of the original game with more levels and new colour schemes. The expansion was released for free on April 21, 2017, for the Windows version of the game. It brings the level count to 4340, adds 60 new colour schemes, and adds a new Hardcore game mode, aimed towards veteran players.

A second expansion, entitled TEN++ was suddenly announced in a trailer on October 16th, 2025, celebrating the game's 10th anniversary. It includes 6 new color schemes as well as some more challenging levels for veterans.

== Reception ==
Reception

Aggregate scores
Aggregator	Score
Metacritic	90/100 (PC); 82/100 (PS4); 88/100 (XB)
OpenCritic	89%

Review scores
Publication	Score
GameSpot	8/10
GamesRadar+	4/5
Nintendo World Report	8/10
PC Gamer (US)	92/100

Review aggregator website Metacritic gives N++ an average score of 82/100 for the PS4 version, 88/100 for the Xbox One version and 90/100 for the PC version. GameSpot awarded it a score of 8 out of 10, saying "N++ may represent an 'if it ain't broke, don't fix it' sort of expansion, but the exhilaration that it continues to offer speaks to the idea that it may have been perfect to begin with."

PC Gamer's Shaun Prescott gave the PC version of the game a 92/100 rating, describing the game as "a masterful distillation of classic action-platforming gameplay, doling out tension and elation in equal measure."

Nintendo World Report rated the Nintendo Switch version 8/10, praising the momentum-based controls and the amount of content, but calling the level editor "convoluted", with the reviewer stating that it took him "too long just to figure out how to delete a tile".

GamesRadar+ gave the game four out of five stars, calling the game a "hardcore platforming excellence", though also opining that the soundtrack "doesn't quite match up to the visuals".
