= List of Wii games using WiiConnect24 =

This is a list of games on the Wii video game console that use WiiConnect24. WiiConnect24 games are distinguished from Wii Wi-Fi Connection games in that WiiConnect24 support only allows for passive connection between players, such as the sharing of credits in Metroid Prime 3: Corruption or Metroid Prime: Trilogy. Some games support both active connectivity with the Nintendo Wi-Fi Connection (requiring an independent 12-digit Friend Code), as well as passive connectivity with WiiConnect24 (only needing the Wii's own 16-digit Friend Code), such as Mario Kart Wii.

After Nintendo's termination of the WiiConnect24 service on June 28, 2013, the following game titles remain virtually playable, but their online connectivity and functionality that requires use of WiiConnect24 are rendered defunct after the ending of the WiiConnect24 service.

== Released games ==
=== Wii ===
| Title | Genre | Developer | Publisher | Japan | North America | Europe |
|---|---|---|---|---|---|---|
| Animal Crossing: City Folk (aka Let's Go to the City) | Social simulation | Nintendo | Nintendo | November 20, 2008 | November 16, 2008 | December 5, 2008 |
| Big Brain Academy: Wii Degree | Puzzle, Educational | Nintendo | Nintendo | April 26, 2007 | July 11, 2007 | July 20, 2007 |
| Blast Works: Build, Trade, Destroy | Scrolling Shooter | Budcat Creations | Majesco | Unreleased | June 10, 2008 | April 3, 2009 |
| Boom Blox | Puzzle | EA Los Angeles | Electronic Arts | July 17, 2008 | May 6, 2008 | May 8, 2008 |
| Dewy's Adventure | Platformer | Konami | Konami | July 26, 2008 | September 18, 2007 | November 23, 2007 |
| Elebits (aka Eledees) | Action/first-person shooter | Konami | Konami | December 2, 2006 | December 12, 2006 | April 1, 2007 |
| Jissen Pachi-Slot Pachinko Hisshôhô! Hokuto no Ken Wii | Pachinko | Sammy | SEGA | May 24, 2007 | Unreleased | Unreleased |
| Mario Kart Wii | Kart racing | Nintendo | Nintendo | April 10, 2008 | April 27, 2008 | April 11, 2008 |
| Marble Saga: Kororinpa | Puzzle | Hudson Soft | Konami | August 6, 2009 | March 17, 2009 | May 1, 2009 |
| Metroid Prime 3: Corruption | First-person action-adventure | Retro Studios | Nintendo | March 6, 2008 | August 27, 2007 | October 26, 2007 |
| Metroid Prime: Trilogy | First-person action-adventure | Retro Studios | Nintendo | Unreleased | August 24, 2009 | Unreleased |
| Pro Evolution Soccer 2008 | Soccer | Konami | Konami | Unreleased | March 18, 2008 | March 28, 2008 |
| Super Smash Bros. Brawl | Fighting | Sora Ltd. / Game Arts | Nintendo | January 31, 2008 | March 9, 2008 | June 27, 2008 |
| SimCity Creator | Simulator | Electronic Arts | Electronic Arts | September 25, 2008 | September 22, 2008 | September 19, 2008 |
| Wii Music | Music | Nintendo | Nintendo | October 16, 2008 | October 20, 2008 | November 14, 2008 |

=== WiiWare ===
| Title | Genre | Developer | Publisher | Japan | North America | Europe |
|---|---|---|---|---|---|---|
| Dr. Mario Online Rx | Puzzle | Arika | Nintendo | March 25, 2008 | May 26, 2008 | May 20, 2008 |
| Maboshi's Arcade | Puzzle | Mindware Corp | Nintendo | October 7, 2008 | December 29, 2008 | August 29, 2008 |
| My Aquarium | Virtual pet simulation | Hudson Soft | Nintendo | June 24, 2008 | September 1, 2008 | August 15, 2008 |
| My Pokémon Ranch | RPG | Ambrella | Nintendo | March 25, 2008 | June 9, 2008 | July 4, 2008 |
| Strong Bad's Cool Game for Attractive People - Episode 1: Homestar Ruiner | Adventure game | Telltale Games | Telltale Games | Unreleased | August 11, 2008 | August 15, 2008 |
| Strong Bad's Cool Game for Attractive People - Episode 2: Strong Badia the Free | Adventure game | Telltale Games | Telltale Games | Unreleased | September 15, 2008 | September 26, 2008 |
| Liight | Puzzle | Studio Walljump | Studio Walljump | Unreleased | March 14, 2011 | Unreleased |

== See also ==
- List of Wii games
- List of WiiWare games
- List of Wii Wi-Fi Connection games
