= Jet Impulse =

2007 video game

- Developer: Nintendo EAD
- Publisher: Nintendo
- Platform: Nintendo DS
- Release: JP: February 8, 2007
- Genre: Flight simulator
- Modes: Single player, Multiplayer

Jet Impulse is a 2007 flight simulation video game developed and published by Nintendo for the Nintendo DS. It was first announced on May 9, 2006, at the pre-E3 Nintendo conference. It was released in Japan in 2007. A North American localization, with the working title DS Air, was planned, but cancelled.

The goal of Jet Impulse is to defeat an evil dictator and his army of elite strike fighters. The game features customizable airplanes and weapons, as well as a co-op mode that can be played over the Nintendo Wi-Fi Connection.

== Plot ==
The story takes place in a fictional world similar to Earth, where a world war erupted along with the use of nuclear munitions. Humanity avoided a post-nuclear apocalypse, and two groups, the Union and the Allies, formed in the ensuing peace. Thirty years later, tensions increased when rival superstate Allies began aggressive attacks into Union territory. In response, Avalon, the strongest Union state, sent Akitsu's finest air force to pacify Mardock, one of the members of Allies.

The main heroes are Naomi Moriha (Callsign Jasmine) and her wingmate, which is the player. They are the newest pilots in the Akitsu military which is home to the Globe Force (An analogy of the UN Peacekeepers). Jasmine was a refugee from Midgard before becoming a member of the Union. The duo's first training regiment goes awry when a defector tries to escape from Zera and Mardock's air force. The pilots managed to destroy a squadron of enemy pilots, but are unable to keep the defector alive, whose last words are "Neopax approaches". The two are soon back in battle when the Akitsu forces stop a terrorist attack on a petroleum plant in Union territory. At this time, they meet an old war ace from Mardock who decides not to attack, hoping the Union has good intentions in preserving the fragile peace between the Union and Allies.

The Akitsu military force finally begins their attack on Mardock. Memories of the third war run through Jasmine as Mardock civilians greet them as saviors. An anti AA bombing runs goes wrong when Crimson attacks, taking out several members of the crew, leaving only Delight, Jasmine, and Cactus as survivors of the attack. They manage to escape the wrath of Crimson and retreat to a Union airbase, where they meet Union ace Sword. At the final fronts of the campaign, Cactus is responsible for carrying a bunker buster payload that will destroy the bunker of the Mardock Government and force them to sue for peace. The Mardock ace Anbaral tells them this is also where civilians are hiding. Jasmine begs Catcus to look for an alternative, but he sends in the bunker buster anyway, which kills both civilian and military personnel, then goes MIA. The war is a bittersweet victory in Jasmine's eyes. The Mardock citizens saw them as saviors, but now they are considered butchers.

The Akitsu forces come back victorious in their campaign, and are greeted as victors, but victory is short lived, as Zera mounts an invasion against Union forces with the threat of nuclear attacks against Avalon by Professor Vladmir, the leader of the Neopax order who had seen firsthand the horrors of the previous world war and seeks to supplant both sides with the intention of creating one world government. Along with defectors, most of the Union forces are soon brought under Neopax alliance control. Jasmine and the player flee to a resistance base in training jets. They then launch a series of defense and counterattacks against the Zera forces including the Orion Star Squadron, Crimson, and former allies. It is then revealed that Government members of the Union had been feeding information and weapons to Neopax's regime, and that Zera was merely the front for the attack. In an attempt to curtail their strength, the Akitsu Navy begin mounting an attack to overthrow the puppet government. A revolution erupts, and the government is overthrown. The proper Union government is restored to power, allowing a counterattack to be mounted against Midgard.

Neopax forces find themselves severely weakened as the supply stash and their Orion Stars are destroyed, which allows the Union forces to finally attack Midgard and end Neopax once and for all. The player engages in a final battle with Cactus. The final reunion between Jasmine and Crimson is bittersweet, as Midgard forces attempt to destroy a dam, which would flood the country and destroy the Union forces at the expense of Midgard. Rather than reunite with her sister, Crimson chooses to die as her plane crashes into the dam and is destroyed. The final battle consists of Jasmine, Delight, and the player mounting an all or nothing air strike against the Neopax HQ, finally bringing an end to the dictator as he attempted to escape to the space station.

At the end of the epilogue on the hard difficulty setting and higher, Jasmine and the player (from his point of view) are seen enjoying a well-deserved vacation as two planes fly overhead.

== Reception ==
Jet Impulse has scored 7, 7, 7, 7 (28/40) on Famitsu Weekly
