= Konductra =

2006 video game

- Developer: oeFun
- Publisher: O~3 Entertainment
- Designer: Ian Dunlop
- Platform: Nintendo DS
- Release: NA: October 31, 2006
- Genre: Puzzle
- Modes: Single-player, multiplayer

Konductra is a puzzle video game for the Nintendo DS, published by O~3 Entertainment. IGN revealed the title in November 2005. At the time, independent developer oeFun had started work without having a publisher lined up. oeFun and O~3 came into a publishing agreement in the summer of 2006 after the title was finished.

Multicoloured pairs of tiles have to be placed on a grid that is lined with 'conductors' by using the DS's stylus, with the aim of creating rows or blocks of the same colour. Once a row of tiles reaches the edge of the board, the pieces can be removed by drawing with the stylus through a conductor and along the chain. The game is also Nintendo Wi-Fi Connection enabled.

A sequel, titled Konductra: Graveyard Shift, was released for download on the Apple iOS on July 18, 2013.

== Gameplay ==
Players destroy lines by matching tiles and using the stylus to trace from like coloured conductors running along the four edges of the screen. The bottom touch screen is where the game is played. The top screen shows integral information about the game being played. The built-in tutorial, with speech, offers an overview of game basics. There is a timer that counts down as the piece is being positioned, and if the tile is not placed on the grid by the time the countdown reaches zero, the piece is automatically put on the board as a "block" tile. These "blocks" can only be removed by being conducted in a chain twice, as opposed to just once for a normal token. Modes include:

- Score: Using the top screen as a reference for potential points, players aim to get a high score. When a line is destroyed, players are awarded the points shown on the top screen, while getting multiple lines multiplies the score shown. At levels 5 and 10, new coloured tokens are introduced.
- Task: The players match the shape shown on the top screen. Once the shape has been successfully duplicated, it must be destroyed to win. There are 66 tasks that can be unlocked, but they must be completed in order. The mode is used to introduce techniques for more complex methods of play.
- VS Human: The players play against another human using the Nintendo DS wireless feature. The object is to beat an opponent by keeping own board clear while simultaneously filling up opponent's board. In this mode, destroying lines directly results in damage to the opponent's board. Each damaged token flips, making it unplayable, until opponents tap it with the stylus. Multiple lines destroyed results in a greater number of flipped tiles. More powerful attacks occur when completely horizontal or vertical lines are drawn from one edge to the opposite edge of the grid. These attacks result in "blocks" being thrown on opponent's board, which must be destroyed (i.e. included in a chain) twice to be completely removed. The game is over when one board is completely filled with tiles or "blocks".
- VS Computer: The players play a normal battle against the computer and unlock up to five successively more difficult CPU skill levels.

=== Online play ===
When playing on the Nintendo Wi-Fi Connection, the Nintendo DS nickname, rank and score of each player are tracked. The leaderboards on Konductra.com can be used to compare individual ranks and scores with players from around the world. Anyone that quits is awarded an automatic loss, to prevent the behaviour often encountered during Mario Kart DS online play, where competitors would exit the game when they realised they were going to lose so as not to affect their rank. Only Worldwide games played on the Nintendo WFC modify the player's ranking – Local/Friend matches do not. When a Nintendo WFC Worldwide match is played, the player's current rank and highest score from the single player Score mode is posted on the online leaderboards.

== Development ==
Konductra was developed by oeFun, inc., an independent video game studio based in Austin, Texas. The studio was founded in 2005 by Ian Dunlop.

== Reception ==
Konductra received average reviews, scoring 60% on Metacritic and 63% on GameRankings. Many critics criticized the bare-bones presentation, but praised the gameplay, some calling it "original" and "solid".

Reception

Aggregate scores
Aggregator	Score
GameRankings	63.59%
Metacritic	60/100

Review scores
Publication	Score
G4	3/5
GameSpot	4.2/10
GamesRadar+	6/10
IGN	6.5/10
Nintendo World Report	5.5/10
