= SilverBirch Studios =

Defunct video game development company

SilverBirch Studios (2004–2009) was a video game developer founded in 2004 by Kevin Birch in the Greater Toronto Area of Ontario, Canada. SilverBirch developed several mobile games and a handheld game, Metanet Software's N+, for the DS and PSP. N+ showed well at E3 2008 and received IGN.com's Best Platform Game at the conference. N+ was released on August 26, 2008 for the DS and PSP in North America. N+ won IGN Game of the Month for August 2008 for both DS and PSP. As a result of losing external funding, Silverbirch Studios closed January 1, 2009.
