= N+ =

2008 video game

- Developers: Slick Entertainment (X360); SilverBirch Studios (DS, PSP); Metanet Software (DS, PSP)
- Publishers: Metanet Software (X360); Atari (DS, PSP)
- Designers: Raigan Burns; Mare Sheppard
- Series: N
- Platforms: Xbox 360, Nintendo DS, PlayStation Portable
- Release: Xbox Live Arcade: WW: February 20, 2008; Nintendo DS, PlayStation Portable: WW: August 26, 2008
- Genre: Platform
- Modes: Single-player, multiplayer

N+ is the console and handheld version of the Adobe Flash game N, which was developed by Metanet Software. N+ for Xbox Live Arcade was developed by Slick Entertainment and published by Metanet Software. Unique versions of the game were also ported separately to the PlayStation Portable and Nintendo DS by developers SilverBirch Studios and Atari. Metanet Software licensed their N IP for this deal, provided single player level design for both versions, and consulted on the project.

The Xbox Live Arcade version was released on February 20, 2008, and three expansion packs were released later that year on July 23, September 10, and October 15. The handheld versions were released on August 26, 2008. N+ was followed by N++ in 2015.

== Gameplay ==
XBLA version

N+ plays with only three buttons and the directional pad, used to control a small black ninja. Players jump, dodge, climb and rebound from walls, collecting gold on their way to a level's exit. Each level the player enters has a time limit based on the ninja's "metabolism" which, according to the instructions for the games, gives the ninja an extremely short life-span and a "thirst for gold". Gold increases the remaining time for players, thus being a valuable item to collect. While the player is given infinite lives, death can still come swift and often, a key design feature of N+. Anything that is dangerous to the ninja will kill them instantly. Droids of varying abilities (seeking missiles, flying droids, ground-based droids, chasing droids, laser droids and rapid fire) can kill the player on contact, as can proximity and timed mines, laser and missile turrets, and simply falling from a dangerous height. Other dangers include one-way walls that can trap players and blocks that fall down on players underneath them. Often, timing-based jumps or momentum-based puzzles come into play in order to reach the goal, and usually switches are required to open multiple locks that block the way to the door, creating a more complex structure than simply reaching the exit. The Xbox Live Arcade version of the game features multiplayer and map-editing, while the DS and PSP versions feature map-sharing and new multiplayer modes in addition to the features of the XBLA version.

== Multiplayer ==
N+ features multiplayer on the Xbox 360, PlayStation Portable, and the Nintendo DS. The Xbox 360 version allows 2-4 players to play, either on the same console, 2 consoles through System Link, or on Xbox Live. The Nintendo DS & PlayStation Portable multiplayer servers shut down on October 2, 2009. SilverBirch Studios closed on January 1, 2009, from losing funding, & later was forced to shut servers down. Metanet Software, the studio that made the original N+ said: "We received word from our stalwart contact at Atari that the valiant efforts to rescue the data servers for N+ PlayStation Portable and Nintendo DS from Silverbirch Studios and reinstate them on-site at Atari have failed, and since the project has unfortunately been something of a financial failure, the community servers are not a priority and will now be abandoned."

== Development ==
Metanet Software joined forces with Klei Entertainment Inc. to develop a version of N+ for the Xbox Live Arcade. Klei Entertainment partnered with a new studio called Slick Entertainment, which took over the development work for N+. Metanet Software produced/published this title, as well as providing all level design and extensive consultation.

An expansion pack for the XBLA version, containing 150 single player levels, 50 multi-player co-operative levels and a few ninja colours were released on July 22, 2008.

Another pack was released on September 11, 2008. This contains 150 harder single player levels, 50 multiplayer race levels and 25 multi-player survival levels, along with a few new costumes for the ninja.

A third pack was released on October 15, 2008. This pack contains 150 hard levels, 50 multi-player co-op and 50 multi-player race levels from the original N restyled for N+. It also contains some new Halloween-themed costumes for the ninja.

== Reception ==
Reception

Aggregate scores
Aggregator	Score
GameRankings	84%
Metacritic	83%

Review scores
Publication	Score
1Up.com	A−
Eurogamer	8/10
Game Informer	8.75/10
GamePro	5/5
GameSpot	7.5/10
IGN	8.5/10
Official Xbox Magazine (UK)	10/10

The Xbox Live Arcade version of N+ scored favorably amongst critics, receiving perfect scores from both GamePro and Official Xbox Magazine UK. Eurogamer's Dan Whitehead said "Purely on the basis that it's a wonderful concept executed with no small amount of wit and style, N+ comes highly recommended - at least to those with a taste for such punishing gameplay. It's obscenely generous in the number of levels you get to play with, while the multiplayer modes provide even more incentive to keep playing." 1UP.com's Nick Suttner called the game "a perfect fit on Live Arcade and is exponentially more entertaining to play with a few friends from your couch. The nuts and bolts hold up as fantastically as ever, and the presentation is spot-on; it's all the more tragic that a few correctable details keep it from being something truly special."

GameSpot commented, "Regardless of your jumping skill, platforming history, or dodging prowess, N+ is sure to leave you equally nonplussed and wanting more," while IGN stated, "N+ is just plain fun to play. The controls feel nice and the levels are creative and addictive."

N+ won the 2008 Popvox Award for Best Console/PC game. GameSpot gave 8.0/10 for PSP and DS versions. In GameSpot's "Best of 2008" the game was nominated in some categories ("Best downloadable content", "Best cooperative multiplayer", "Best implementation of user-generated content", "Best Platformer" and "Best PSP game") but did not win any of them. It was also nominated for Best Platform Game on the Nintendo DS in IGN's 2008 video game awards.

N+ was also named in the 2010 reference book 1001 Video Games You Must Play Before You Die.
