= Taoyuan =

Taoyuan may refer to:

== Mainland China ==
- Taoyuan County (桃源縣), county of Changde, Hunan
- Taoyuan Subdistrict (disambiguation)

== Taiwan ==
- Taoyuan, Taiwan (桃園市), special municipality, formerly known as Taoyuan County (桃園縣)
- Taoyuan District (桃園區), urban district of Taoyuan City, formerly itself known as Taoyuan City
- Taoyuan District, Kaohsiung (桃源區), rural district of Kaohsiung City
- Taoyuan International Airport (IATA: TPE), the main international airport in Taiwan

== Religion ==
- Taoyuan or Guiyidao, a Chinese salvationist religion

== See also ==
- Taoyuan Air Base, a former Republic of China Air Force base
- Tao Yuan (disambiguation)
- Taiyuan, capital and largest city of Shanxi province in North China
