= Tao Yuan =

Tao Yuan may refer to:

- Tao Yuan (Shaman King), a character from the manga and anime series Shaman King, who is the father of Tao Ren and Tao Jun, a powerful shaman
- Tao Yuan (footballer) (born 1993), Chinese footballer
- Tao Yuan or Guiyidao, a Chinese salvationist religion

== See also ==
- Taoyuan (disambiguation), various places in Mainland China and Taiwan
