= List of Shaman King characters =

The manga and anime series Shaman King features several characters created by Hiroyuki Takei. As a result of being focused on shamanism the series' cast is divided between humans and spirits, the latter not being able to go the afterlife due to their alliance with the former.

The series primarily focuses on a teenager boy named Yoh Asakura, who reveals to his classmate Manta Oyamada that he is a shaman when fighting a group delinquents led by Ryu. Wishing to lead a peaceful life, Yoh has been training from an early age to become the titular "Shaman King", who will be able to change the world according to his will. During Yoh's training, Manta meets Yoh's demanding fiancée, Anna Kyoyama and Yoh's spirit partner, the samurai Amidamaru. In his journey to become Shaman King, Yoh also meets with a number of rival shamans who seek to become Shaman King for their own reasons and visions of the future, some who become his allies and others who become his enemies. The series' sequel, Shaman King: Flowers, deals with Yoh's son, Hana Asakura, and his development as a shaman.

== Creation and conception ==
In terms of developing Shaman King, Takei has noted that he creates the characters first and develops the story around them. The originality of characters was emphasized so that they stand out, which may include incorporating designs that appeal to Takei; in particular, the fox and raccoon-dog duo of Konchi and Ponchi were inspired by Ren and Stimpy.

For Takei, the female lead Anna Kyoyama was regarded as the easiest character to draw and the protagonist Yoh Asakura was the hardest; Takei explained that it was difficult to develop Yoh's character because of the criteria set by Weekly Shōnen Jump. The engagement between Yoh and Anna being introduced at the beginning of the story has been regarded as unusual for a shonen manga for its maturity and partly reflects Takei's own personal experience, but it still an ideal relationship.

A number of characters in Shaman King previously appeared in Takei's preceding work, Butsu Zone, though Takei regards both Shaman King and Butsu Zone as occurring in different worlds akin to Osamu Tezuka's Star System. Notably, Anna Kyoyama was based on the lead character in his debut one-shot, Itako no Anna, who also inspired a character with a similar design and background in Butsu Zone; Takei has remarked that Anna is his signature character. The members from the Gandhara faction, particularly its leader Sati Saigan, also appear to be heavily based on the main characters from Butsu Zone.

== Main characters ==
=== Yoh Asakura ===
Yoh Asakura (麻倉 葉, Asakura Yō) is an easy-going teenage boy with the ability to see ghosts. He quickly becomes friends with Manta and reveals that he is training to eventually become the Shaman King. Though he is too lazy to train properly, he is motivated by a promise he made to his fiancée, Anna Kyoyama, to give her an easy life once he becomes Shaman King. While he remarks that he wants to become Shaman King in order to live a carefree and easy life, those closest to Yoh know that he wants to create a world where no one has to suffer from loneliness like Yoh did as a child because he was a shaman and nobody understood or accepted him.

Unexpectedly, he is not only the latest descendant of the Asakura family, a family famed for their spiritual powers, but also the twin brother of Hao Asakura, who is a reincarnation of the immensely powerful founder of the Asakura family and the primary antagonist of the series. As a result, Yoh is the Asakura family's greatest hope of finally defeating Hao at last and saving the world from impending destruction. During the Shaman Fight, Yoh is the leader of Team Funbari Onsen. In the manga, when it becomes apparent that currently known methods of training will not allow any shaman to defeat Hao, Yoh is sent to Hell to train, an honour given to him by Lady Sati, and is granted the power of purification. He becomes one of the Five Grand Elemental Spirits and gains the Spirit of Earth.

=== Anna Kyōyama ===
Anna Kyoyama (恐山 アンナ, Kyōyama Anna), nicknamed Anna the Itako II (二代目イタコのアンナ, Nidaime Itako no Anna), is Yoh Asakura's fiancėe and a powerful itako (a spirit medium in the 2001 English anime), with the ability to summon and channel spirits even from Heaven. She is unrelentingly brutal with Yoh's training in order to ensure he wins the Shaman Tournament and becomes Shaman King. Anna attends Shinra Private Academy along with Yoh and Manta. She has previously appeared in Hiroyuki Takei's other works, including Butsu Zone and Itako no Anna, and is notably the mascot for the Aomori Prefecture's police force.

After being abandoned by her birth parents due to her abilities, Anna was adopted by Kino Asakura, Yoh's grandmother who resides in Aomori, as one of her apprentices. Her surname, Kyoyama, was given to her by Kino and is an alternate reading of the characters for Mount Osore, where Anna was found. Though most itako are blind, Anna is fully sighted and extremely powerful; her considerable spiritual strength allows her to seal Hao's guardian ghosts, Zenki and Kouki, and take control of them. Her powers originally included the ability to read minds, which caused her to create powerful demons from negative emotions until she was saved by Yoh and Matamune and the ability was sealed. Out of deep gratitude for how he saved her life, she believes that it is her responsibility to train him hard so that he can achieve his dream of becoming Shaman King. Despite how badly she seems to treat Yoh, she openly admits that she loves him, expressing jealousy when she thinks he is interested in other girls and breaking down only when she believes that Yoh is truly in danger, in contrast to her unflinching confidence in him under other dangerous situations.

Her strong will and blunt personality often inspire fear in her close friends, particularly Yoh. She is one of the few who does not openly express fear to Hao, who is intrigued by her attitude and acknowledges her strength and how she reminds him of his mother, Asanoha Douji. However, she genuinely cares for those important to her, especially Yoh, and is simply dedicated to being "the ultimate Shaman Queen" and wife to Yoh, the first real friend that she ever had in her life.

=== Manta Oyamada ===
Voiced by: Inuko Inuyama (Japanese); Oliver Wyman (English)

Manta Oyamada (小山田 まん太, Oyamada Manta), known as Mortimer "Morty" Oyamada in both the uncut and edited dubs of the 2001 anime and English-dubbed video games based on that adaptation, is Yoh's best friend and the first human to try and understand Yoh without any discrimination. An intelligent and thoughtful boy who carries a book with him every day, he attends Shinra Private Academy with Yoh and Anna. He is physically very short, a fact that he is extremely sensitive about, and has been mistaken as a Koropokuru, a shy nature spirit from northern Japan. Though he is not a shaman and unable to use his spiritual powers like Yoh and Anna, he is capable of seeing spirits and faithfully stands by Yoh. Throughout the series, Manta acts as the primary narrator of the events in Shaman King.

In the manga and original Japanese anime, his family owns the Oyamada Electronics Company and, therefore, is very rich. His parents disapprove of Manta's friendship with Yoh while his younger sister, Mannoko, seems to enjoy making fun of Manta. He has a strained relationship with his family, who plays little role in the story and, following their initial appearance, they are never seen again in the manga until a brief appearance by Mansumi toward the end of the series, where the Oyamada president leads several battleships to destroy and capture Shamans. In the manga and Japanese anime, Manta has an assistant, Tamurazaki, though he is mostly Mansumi's lapdog and winds up gunning down at least one of Hao's followers. While he is unable to help Yoh to become stronger as a shaman, Manta uses what advantages he has to support his friend, such as his incredible wealth, to help Anna reach the United States to bring the Ultra Senji Ryakketsu to Yoh after he has left to find the Patch Village.

In the 2001 anime, during the Shaman Tournament, Manta becomes a shaman with Mosuke, Amidamaru's best friend who forged Harusame, as his Guardian Spirit. His relationship with Mosuke soon parallels Yoh's own relationship with Amidamaru, as well as their existing relationships with their best friends. Because Manta is untrained as a shaman, he is unable to maintain spirit form from losing furyoku quickly and generally communicates with Mosuke through his laptop. During the final battle against Hao, Manta is able to use his laptop to form a hammer-shaped Over Soul to knock out Hao's shikigami and force his friends to calm down long enough to regroup and defeat Hao. In the manga, Manta is generally an observer throughout the Shaman Fight and often questions his presence in a battle that he cannot directly contribute to. At the conclusion of the series, he appears at the head of the Soul Train to save Yoh and his friends from falling into oblivion, expressing happiness and relief that he could finally help Yoh. Several years later, he attends college in America, studying ways to combine shamanism with business, and brings presents for his friends at their reunion at Funbari Onsen.

=== Hao Asakura ===
Voiced by: Minami Takayama (Japanese); Sebastian Arcelus (2001 series), Erica Mendez (2021 series) (English)

Hao Asakura (麻倉 葉王 (ハオ), Asakura Hao) ("Zeke Asakura" in the English dub of the 2001 anime) is the main antagonist of Shaman King, currently the second reincarnation of his original self and the twin brother of Yoh. He is the most powerful participant in the Shaman Tournament, with Furyoku at 1,250,000, an extremely high level compared with the other characters' Furyoku levels in Shaman King. While he exhibits ruthlessness towards his opponents, he acts surprisingly easy-going and affable, similar to Yoh's personality.

Originally, one thousand years ago, Hao was the founder of the Asakura family and a powerful Onmyōji priest who possessed incredible spiritual powers, including the ability to sense the thoughts and desires of those around him. Regarded as a master of the Wu Xing pentagram, he was able to control the five elements that give form to creation. However, his compassionate heart was overcome by his deep-seated desire to avenge his mother's death and his growing hatred of humans because of their selfish natures. Failing to win his first Shaman King tournament because of the combined efforts of the Asakura family to stop him, Hao was able to reincarnate with full awareness of his past life in time to participate in the next tournament and again for the current tournament.

In his second life five centuries later, Hao was reincarnated as a member of the Patch Tribe, who would be an ancestor to Silva, and massacred the Seminoa tribe. After successfully taking control of the Spirit of Fire, an elemental spirit that embodies the essence of one of the five elements of nature, he attempted to become Shaman King again. Despite possessing such advantages, he was defeated by Yohken Asakura, one of his descendants, and the spirit Matamune, who reluctantly put aside his love and loyalty for Hao for the sake of saving the world.

In his most recent reincarnation, Hao chose to reincarnate as a member of the Asakura family by splitting his soul between Keiko Asakura's twin sons. The newborn Hao escaped the Asakura family's attempt on his life with the Spirit of Fire, while badly burning Mikihisa, leaving Yoh behind with the promise to reclaim him someday. During the 1998 Shaman Fight, gathering an entourage of followers, Hao succeeds in becoming Shaman King but is convinced by Yoh and his friends not to wipe out humanity and ultimately forgive them. But during the events of Shaman King: Flowers, Hao assembles a team of shamans to represent him in the Flower of Maize tournament, by his Shaman King predecessors, when they agreed to hold it after a vote of no confidence.

=== Hana Asakura ===
Voiced by: Yoko Hikasa (Japanese); Brianna Knickerbocker (English)

Hana Asakura (麻倉花, Asakura Hana) is the son of Yoh Asakura and Anna Kyoyama who is the protagonist of Shaman King: Flowers, first introduced in the Shaman King epilogue sidestory "Funbari no Uta" as an infant traveling alongside Ryu to find the Five Grand Elemental Spirits. He is depicted as a Shaman having Yoh's spirit guardian, Amidamaru, alongside him using him with the Futsu-no-Mitama no Tsurugi (フツノミタマの剣) weapon to create two Over Souls, O.S. "Oni Kabuto" (O.S. 鬼兜) and O.S. "Oni Kabuto Though" (O.S. 鬼兜). He lives at Tamao Tamamura's care while his parents are absent. Hana is bored with his life and finds the appearance of his fiancé Alumi Niumbirch and his proclaimed enemies Yohane and Luka Asakura as a way to kill his boredom. Hana also possesses several Oni sealed inside him that will be summoned when he is in danger in order to protect him. They were placed by his uncle, Hao Asakura, when he was a baby.

== Supporting characters ==
=== Ryunosuke Umemiya ===
Voiced by: Masahiko Tanaka (Japanese); Sean Schemmel (2001 series), D. C. Douglas (2021 series) (English)

Ryunosuke Umemiya (梅宮 竜之介, Umemiya Ryūnosuke), known more commonly as "Wooden Sword" Ryu (木刀の 竜, Bokutou no Ryu) and "Rio" in the 4Kids English dub of the 2001 anime, is introduced as a gang leader who is always on the lookout for his "Happy Place" ("Best Place" in the Japanese version and the "Sacred Hang" in the 2001 anime's English dub) and cute girls, prone to getting his elaborate pomapour damaged as a running gag for the first half of the series. His gang is known as the Dead Enders in the English anime and they are very devoted to Ryu, who returns their dedication to him. Following his defeat by Yoh, Ryu ends up being possessed by Tokagero while finding a potential hang out at a rundown bowling alley in Funbari. After being saved by Yoh, Ryu became a devoted friend with aspirations of becoming a chef once the Funbari Hot Springs is established.

After the incident, Anna reveals that Ryu has great potential to be a shaman as he left Funbari for an unspecified time while undergoing training by Yoh's grandfather Yohmei to become a shaman with a redeemed Tokagero as his spirit ally. Ryu joins the group in the Shaman Fight as a member of Team Funbari Hot Springs with his resourcefulness and devotion to his friends being his strong points. While Ryu expresses the desire to become Shaman King for the sake of finding his own "Shaman Queen," he fully supports Yoh because he believes that Yoh is the sort of person who can make the world a "Best Place" for everyone. At the conclusion of the series, he works as a chef at the Funbari Hot Springs while looking after Yoh and Anna's son Hana.

=== Johann Faust VIII ===
Voiced by: Takehito Koyasu (Japanese); Sam Riegel (2001 series), Matt Caplan (2001 series, 2021 series) (English)

Hailing from Heidelberg Germany, Johann Faust VIII (ファウストVIII世, Fausuto Hassei) is the eighth-generation descendant of the legendary Doctor Faustus, who made a deal with the devil Mephistopheles for his necromancy skills along with youth and riches for seven years in exchange for his immortal soul. Faustus' descendants, including Faust VIII, distanced themselves from their ancestor's legacy, turning to the profession of medicine and regarding Faustus as a taboo within the family.

Following family tradition, Faust VIII studied medicine and fell deeply in love with a young woman named Eliza, who had an incurable disease. Faust's perseverance eventually paid off as he cured Eliza and they married, only for Eliza to be shot dead by a robber. Faust lost his mind and turns to his ancestor's forbidden legacy to resurrect Eliza with necromancy with her skeleton as a shaman medium, but he is only able to conjure an image of her using his furyoku. His motivation to become Shaman King is in hopes of fully resurrecting Eliza and is utterly single-minded about achieving his goal.

Yoh is defeated by Faust in the Shaman Fight's second fight. Because he is self-taught, Anna recognizes Faust's talents and forces Yoh to accept him as the third member of Team Funbari Hot Spring after she summons Eliza's ghost; her ulterior motive is apparently to have Faust eventually become the team's doctor. Reunited with his beloved Eliza, Faust becomes dedicated to Yoh and Anna out of sincere gratitude, utilizing his shamanic and medical skills to support Yoh, and becomes powerful enough to resurrect the dead after training with the Ultra Senji Ryakketsu. Despite appearing as the weakest member of Yoh's team, Faust is highly ingenious; in battle he replaces his missing legs with the skeleton of his pet dog, Frankenstiney, to regain his mobility, and during the invasion of the Plants, he composes the "Funbari Poem" song as a counter to the officiants' Patch Song.

The embodiment of complete dedication, Faust's greatest strengths are his selflessness and pure-hearted spirit; like Yoh, he will not hesitate to save his enemies if he can. Beyond his emotional instability, particularly when Eliza is insulted or threatened, he is completely rational and will not tolerate interruptions while working. At the conclusion of the series, Faust is killed during the invasion of the Plants while fighting the officiant Radim, but his spirit continues to accompany and support Yoh, who integrates with his spirit to utilize Faust's shamanic healing abilities. Though he is initially resurrected after the conclusion of the final battle, he collapses soon afterward from exhaustion. He elects not to be revived in order to remain with Eliza in the Great Spirit. To honor his memory, his "Funbari Poem" jingle is used as the theme song for the inn and the Funbari Onsen staff places his portrait in their family shrine.

=== Team The Ren ===
Team "The Ren" (チームTHE蓮, Chīmu "Za Ren") is a team formed by Tao Ren during the second round of the Shaman Fights.

==== Tao Ren ====
Voiced by: Romi Park (Japanese); Andrew Rannells (2001 series), Laura Stahl (2021 series), Sean Rohani (Adult) (English)

Tao Ren (道蓮; Japanese: Tao Ren, Chinese: Dào Lián), known as Tao Len in the 4Kids English dub of the 2001 anime and video games based on that adaptation, is a Chinese shaman who is Yoh's rival and later of Team The Ren during the tournament section of the Shaman Fight. He is confident in his strength and does not directly accept help from others out of pride, though these qualities along with his short temper and impatience often limit his abilities. After meeting Yoh, Ren's strong sense of pride moves towards his ability to protect his friends, whom he cares for deeply despite frequently arguing and fighting with them. His most notable trait is the distinctive single spike in his hairstyle.

Ren is one of the most skilled and physically powerful shamans in the series as a result of dedicated training since childhood. His acuity in battle has allowed him to master techniques, such as those utilized by Mikihisa Asakura, by watching and experiencing them. In combat, Ren wields a guan dao and the Bâo-Lèi (宝レイ剣, Hō-Rei-Ken; Jewel Thunder) sword, a family heirloom given to Ren when he proves to his father that he is strong enough to choose his own path, and he is capable of fighting on horseback. According to Pascal Avaf, Ren's affinity to the Spirit of Thunder is well-suited as it follows the way of Taoism. Additionally, because Ren has died more than once, his furyoku levels are notably very high and he is strong enough to be one of the few shamans who can actually stare straight into the heart of the Great Spirit without fainting.

Serious and emotionally aloof, Ren has been groomed since childhood by his father, Tao Yúan, to become the next Shaman King and developed a deep hatred for humanity, desiring to eliminate them all. As a result of his upbringing, he believes his spirit Bason is merely a tool and that befriending him would allow the spirit to take advantage of him. However, his encounters with Yoh and his friends gradually allow him to trust others and find true friends who are willing to risk their lives for him, such that Ren chooses to defy the destiny his family has outlined for him and decide how to live his own life.

However, the consequences of his actions in the past affect him throughout the Shaman Fight. Because the Patch officiant Nichrom holds a personal grudge against him for killing his brother, Chrom, Ren is fatally stabbed by Peyote Diaz, forcing Yoh to agree to Iron Maiden Jeanne's condition that she will only resurrect Ren if Yoh withdraws from the Shaman Fight. Ren also comes to fear that the hatred he has held makes him no different to Hao. Later in the manga, he is recognized by Lady Sati as one of the Five Grand Elemental Spirits and gains the Spirit of Thunder.

Several years after the Shaman Fight, Ren is a successful businessman after studying at Tsinghua University and forming an electronics manufacturing company, the Raitei Group (雷帝グループ), with Hang Zang-Ching and Bill Burton. He eventually has a son, Men (黽; Chinese: Mǐn), who strongly resembles his father. The child's name and his blood-red eyes and silver hair indicate that Ren married Iron Maiden Jeanne, and Men later inherits both Bason and Shamash as his guardian spirits.

==== Horohoro ====
Voiced by: Yūji Ueda (Japanese); Michael Sinterniklaas (English)

Horohoro (ホロホロ), known by the nickname "Trey Racer" in the 4Kids English dub of the 2001 anime, is an Ainu shaman from Hokkaidō, the northernmost of Japan's major islands. He is Yoh's first opponent in the preliminary round of the Shaman Fight and despite losing to Yoh, he quickly becomes one of Yoh's closest friends. His goal in the Shaman Fight is to save Koropokuru, a tiny spirit of people, by creating a vast field of butterbur. Horohoro's name sounds and is spelled (in Katakana) like "boroboro," which means "raggedy" and characters mispronouncing/misspelling his name is a running gag in the series, while his name Horokeu comes from horkew, Ainu word meaning wolf. It is later revealed that Horohoro's real name is Horokeu Usui (碓氷ホロケウ, Usui Horokeu), a name he refuses to call himself out of the guilt he feels for indirectly causing the death of Tamiko Kurobe, a girl nicknamed Damuko who became his close friend.

Good-natured and cheerful, Horohoro forces himself to appear hot-headed and loudmouthed. He is highly secretive about his past, not even willing to tell his friends about it because of his feelings toward Tamiko Kurobe and her death. He is heavily burdened with the creed that his father taught him – that "the strong feed on the weak" – but finds resolve in his own tenacity and understanding that that same creed does not mean he should give up. In battle, Horohoro is very competitive, even going so far as to turn Ryu's arms to ice and shatter them during the match between Team The Ren and Team Funbari Onsen and worrying about his position on Ren's position. Though he argues frequently with Ren, he is nevertheless dedicated to his friends and expresses his serious side only in the most dangerous situations when he can no longer afford to restrain himself with his hotheadedness.

Horohoro's guardian ghost is Kororo ("Corey" in the 4Kids English dub of the 2001 anime), a Koropokuru spirit who allows him to generate ice and form an Over Soul with Horohoro's snowboard and an Ikupasi talisman that Pirika makes for him. While he admits that he is not particularly intelligent or good with numbers, he has a strong understanding of the flow of nature, allowing him to excel at the FumonTonkou (the "Shamanic Oracle") technique, and is highly resourceful even with a low amount of furyoku, as seen when he utilizes Kororo and the Icemen's three spirits in battle. He has a strong relationship with Kororo, particularly after learning her original identity was that of his friend Damuko. In the manga, he is recognized as one of the Five Grand Elemental Spirits by Lady Sati and gains the Spirit of Rain. He is regarded as the third strongest member of the Five Grand Elemental Spirits. Several years after the Shaman Fight, Horohoro returns to Hokkaidō where he works on a farm, which appears to include a butterbur field. While his entrepreneurial effort to market a blue candy-flavored marimo ball is a commercial failure, he works hard at fighting against illegal logging companies.

==== Joco McDonnell ====
Voiced by: Motoko Kumai (Japanese); Matthew George (2001 series), A.J. Beckles (2021 series) (English)

Joco McDonnell (チョコラブ・マクダネル, Chokorabu Makudaneru; "Chocolove McDonnell") is an African-American shaman from New York who uses puns to make people laugh. He was originally a member of a street gang known as Shaft after losing his parents on Christmas, with Camel Munzer among the many people he killed. But Joco encountered Orona and adopted his philosophy and dreams to save the world through laughter as Shaman King. Joining Yoh's group, he becomes the third member of Team The Ren. When he is confronted by Redseb and Seyram Munzer, who seek to avenge their father, after the children's Golem has killed his old friends, Joco accepts responsibility as he is killed by the Golem. He meets Orona within the Great Spirit and is convinced to face his own guilt before being resurrected by Lady Sati, asking her to take his sight as part of his atonement as he becomes one of the five legendary warriors and eventually acquires the Spirit of Wind during the final battle with Hao. Following the end of the Shaman Fight, Joco turned himself in to the authorities for a seventeen-year sentence as a model prisoner before arrangements were made for him to reunite with the others at the Funbari Hot Springs. The 2001 anime altered Joco's backstory to be an orphan that encountered Orona.

Joco's medium to make his Over Soul "Black Jaguar" are metal claws he named Shaft, using a variant of Integration to utilize Mic's claws and eyes with black markings all over his body to give a similar resemblance to that of a Jaguar, hence the name. Joco acquired Pascal Avaf during his first death, using him in conjunction with Mic to evolve his Over Soul into an armor Over Soul, Jaguarman. In this Over Soul Joco gains a new attack called "Jaguar Shaft". In the 2001 anime, after training using the Ultra Senji Ryakketsu, Joco's Over Soul evolved into a giant Mic with wings.

The English release of the manga edits Joco's lips so that they match those of the other main characters to avoid a blackface stereotype resemblance, though his lips remain unedited in the 4Kids and Jetix versions of the 2001 anime along with the credits for the video game Shaman King: Master of Spirits. Joco is later given a less exaggerated and more normalized design for the 2021 anime reboot.

=== Lyserg Diethel ===
Voiced by: Yoko Soumi (Japanese); Erica Schroeder, Greg Abbey (Adult) (English)

Lyserg and Morphine in the 2001 anime

Lyserg Diethel (リゼルグ・ダイゼル, Rizerugu Daizeru) is a young shaman from London who comes from a family of shamans who make a living as detectives, striving to become a great detective as his father. Lyserg entered to Shaman Fight to kill Hao for murdering his parents during his sixth birthday. Though he is intelligent and kindhearted, he has poor judgment in situations involving children and their parents as a result of his own personal experience. Lyserg's name is a reference to lysergic acid diethylamide, while Morphine is also a drug reference, with both referring to Sherlock Holmes' drug addictions.

Shortly after Yoh and his friends are forced to find Patch Village to enter the Shaman Fight, Ryu encounters Lyserg, whom he initially mistakes as a girl because of Lyserg's androgynous appearance. Hoping to find strong allies, he challenges Yoh's group to test their strength and is defeated and rebuked by Yoh for how Lyserg treats others. Though Yoh disagrees with Lyserg's desire for revenge, he allows Lyserg to join his group in hopes that they will be able to temper Lyserg's hatred and keep him from killing others unnecessarily. However, Lyserg quickly finds the X-Laws' single-minded ideology focusing on justice more appealing than Yoh's philosophies and joins them instead. He quickly becomes devoted to the group's leader Iron Maiden Jeanne and is mentored by Marco, the group's de facto head.

In the manga, Lyserg forms Team X-I with Jeanne and Marco. As the tournament progresses, Lyserg's attachment to his former friends gradually causes him to see that Yoh's way of seeing a situation is not entirely wrong and attempts to deter them from confronting the X-Laws. When he is sent to Hell to train, he is guided by Joco's spirit Pascal Avaf and realizes how he has been too consumed by his own hatred to see things clearly. He is later recognized by Lady Sati as one of the Five Grand Elemental Spirits and returns to being one of Yoh's allies. In the 2001 anime, he is one of the last surviving members of the X-Laws after their failed assault on Hao by attempting to open the Gate of Babylon. After Meene Montgomery returns Morphine to Lyserg, she forces him to leave the group and rejoin Yoh and his friends.

As a shaman, Lyserg specializes in dowsing, which allows him to use his powers to locate people or objects. His primary medium is a crystal pendulum, which he uses to form an Over Soul with Morphine, a poppy spirit who serves as Lyserg's spirit ally. In combat, Lyserg utilizes his Over Soul like a rope dart and is known for his considerable agility. As a member of the X-Laws, he is granted an angel spirit, Zeruel, contained within a derringer as a medium. While he abandons Morphine for Zeruel in the 2001 anime, he and Morphine are inseparable in the manga. As one of the Five Grand Elemental Spirits (notably as the smartest), he receives the Spirit of Fire when Hao discards it upon being recognized uncontested as the Shaman King. Several years after the Shaman Fight, Lyserg returned to England and graduated from Oxford University to become a police officer. Because of his shamanic abilities and combat skills learned from his time as a member of Yoh's group and as an X-Law, he garnered a high arrest rate and was eventually promoted to British Secret Intelligence Agency.

=== Team Hao ===
Team Hao (チームハオ, Chīmu Hao) is the team that Hao Asakura assembled to represent him in the Flower of Maize tournament during the events of Shaman King Flowers, with Hana as team leader.

==== Tao Men ====
Voiced by: Romi Park

Tao Men (道黽; Japanese: Tao Men, Chinese: Dào Mǐn) is the son of Tao Ren and Iron Maiden Jeanne, inheriting Bason and Shamash from them. He comes off having a superiority complex due to his upbringing, but adhere to a no-killing policy his parents implement on him.

==== Yohane Asakura ====
Voiced by: Shun Horie

Yohane Asakura (麻倉 葉羽, Asakura Yōhane) is a member of the Asakura Family's branch who carries one of Hao's earrings on his person, having the ronin Oboro Daikyoh as his spirit ally. Having been sheltered as a child in the mountains near Kyoto, he sought to kill Hana to take his place as future head of the family. But eventually makes peace with his cousin.

==== Alumi Niumbirch ====
Voiced by: Sumire Uesaka

Alumi Niumbirch (アルミ・ニウムバーチ, Arumi Niumubāchi), nicknamed Anna the Itako III (三代目イタコのアンナ, Sandaime Itako no Anna) is the daughter of Silva who was born during the Shaman Fight. She was raised by Anna I and the Gandhara group with the former teaching her the ways of an Itako before becoming an apprentice to Anna Asakura, who declared to bethrove her to Hana. Like her father, Alumi uses the Silver Arms as her spirit allies along with other spirits she can summon as an Itako. She serves as Team Hao's manager.

==== Gakko Ibuki ====
Voiced by: Michiko Kaiden

Gakko Ibuki (伊吹ガッコ, Ibuki Gakko) is an aloof youth transgender boy who enjoys fighting, having Namaha as his spirit ally. He joined the Flower of Maize to fulfill his wish to be the strongest man alive.

=== Asakura Family ===
Yohmei Asakura (麻倉葉明, Asakura Yōmei)
Voiced by: Takeshi Aono (2001 series), Hiroshi Naka (2021 series) (Japanese); Jim Napolitano (2001 series), Doug Stone (2021 series) (English)
Yohmei is Yoh's maternal grandfather and an onmyōji who specializes in divination and exorcism, and utilizes leaf shikigami. Born on July 2, 1919, he is the current head of the Asakura family. While highly respected as an onmyouji, Yohmei acknowledges that it has been difficult to find work in the modern era as fewer people believe in spirits. His divination techniques, however, are high in demand from the rich and powerful wanting to know their fortunes, so he does not worry about money. Yohmei is also known for using leaf Shikigami, creating and controlling any number of these small Over Souls using small leaves as mediums. Yohmei almost constantly uses these, even outside of combat, to do small tasks like fetching items, holding the newspaper, and so forth. Strangely, these spirits can move through telephone lines. His favored technique, the Asakura Shiki Onmyōjutsu Hyaku Shikigami (Asakura Style Yin and Yang Technique – Hundred Shikigami) creates countless Shikigami so he can surround an opponent and attack them from all directions at once. Before Yoh was born, Yohmei foresaw that Hao Asakura would be reincarnated in one of his daughter Keiko's unborn twin children and reluctantly decided that he would kill both children upon birth rather than risk allowing Hao to be reborn. However, Yohmei hesitated for a moment as he was hit with remorse for killing his own grandchildren, which was sufficient for Hao to summon the Spirit of Fire and escape. Though the Asakuras were disappointed with allowing Hao to escape, they embraced the fact that Yoh, Hao's twin brother, had survived and they believed that Yoh was the family's best chance of finally defeating Hao for good. Since Yoh's childhood, Yohmei has trained him to become Shaman King, though Yoh's lazy and stubborn nature made the task difficult. When Yoh fails to defeat Faust VIII in the qualifying round of the Shaman Fight, he returns to Izumo with Anna and Amidamaru to consult Yohmei on how to improve his furyoku levels; Yohmei suggests a dangerous method – traveling through the Yomi Cave (Tunnel of Tartarus). Before Yoh leaves for the Shaman Fight, he also sends a package containing the Futsunomitama sword to Yoh and later entrusts Anna to deliver the Ultra Senji Ryakketsu to Yoh along with the Asakura family's true relationship to Hao upon realizing that Yoh cannot hope to defeat Hao as he is now. He and Kino later go to the Patch Village during the Shaman Fight when it becomes apparent that Hao is unstoppable; in the manga, they are joined by Keiko, Mikihisa, and the spirit of Yohken Asakura, as they collaborate with the Tao family on how to deal with Hao.

Kino Asakura (麻倉 木乃, Asakura Kino)
Voiced by: Hisako Kyōda (Japanese); Erica Schroeder (English)
A master itako who trains young girls in the art at Osorezan, born on March 24, 1924, Kino is Yoh's grandmother and the wife of Yohmei. In her youth, Matamune mentions that she had been very beautiful, though she had already lost her sight during World War II. With very few options left, she chose to become itako and became accomplished enough to marry Yohmei. Her temperament is similar enough to Anna's that Yohmei fears getting hit by his wife and getting on her bad side, though she expresses her kindhearted nature to Yoh and Anna, whom she found and raised as her apprentice. Instead of living at the Asakura family home in Izumo, she chooses to live in Shimokita, in the Aomori prefecture, near Osorezan. She runs what is ostensibly a traditional Japanese inn, the "Yasui Ryokan (安井旅館)". In reality however, she uses the inn to house her apprentices. When Anna was abandoned as a child, Kino sensed the amount of spiritual power Anna possessed and took her in; because Anna sensed that Kino had no ulterior motives for saving her, Kino became the first and only person Anna trusted until she met Yoh. Impressed though concerned with the level of Anna's spiritual power, Kino suggested that Anna should marry Yoh and eventually trained Anna to be an itako. She regards Anna as her favorite over all her students, boasting to her husband that Anna is her pride.

Keiko Asakura (麻倉 茎子, Asakura Keiko)
Voiced by: Mika Doi (Japanese); Erica Schroeder (2001 anime), Erika Harlacher (2021 anime) (English)
Mikihisa's wife and Yoh's mother. She normally works as an Office lady, but also works as a miko (translated by some as a cleric) at a local shrine. It is unknown as to the extent of her spiritual powers, but she is capable of seeing ghosts and hearing the voices of kami spirits and capable of divining the future. She is the daughter of Yohmei and Kino; Mikihisa was adopted into the Asakura family when he married Keiko. As a young woman, she lived in Tokyo alone at the inn Yohmei rented for her, which would eventually be the inn where Yoh and Anna would reside. In the manga, she plays minor, though active role, in aiding her family against Hao Asakura. A woman possessing a strong character, she agrees to sacrifice both her children upon birth when her family decides it is the only way to stop Hao from being reborn. When the effort fails, she is relieved and grateful when Yoh is spared and hopeful that her son will be able to stop Hao at last. After foreseeing that Hao cannot be stopped from becoming Shaman King, she personally acts as a messenger for the Asakura and arrives on the Tao's estate in China shortly after Ren's departure to deliver the message. After the secret of Yoh's relationship to Hao is revealed, Keiko directly approaches the Tao family with the offer of having Mikihisa teach members of Ren's team techniques from the Ultra Senji Ryakketsu. She also appears in subsequent meetings the Asakura holds with the Tao family.

Yohken Asakura (麻倉 葉賢, Asakura Yōken)
Voiced by: Shin-ichiro Miki (Japanese); Kirk Thornton (English)
An ancestor of Yoh Asakura who lived around 500 years ago, a powerful ascetic priest. Following his duty as a member of the Asakura family, Yohken entered the Shaman Fight of 500 years ago to defeat the second incarnation of Hao Asakura with Matamune's help. One of his techniques is Over Soul "Onigoroshi" (Demon Killer) – Yohken used this with Matamune, using his Shakujou as his medium. In the manga, it was the same Over Soul that Yoh used when he saved Anna from the Oni, although Yohken uses his Shakujou (ring-topped Buddhist priests' staff) as the medium. :Yohken is implied to have died shortly after defeating Hao. However, his soul wound up in Hell, trapped by the guilt he felt at having killed another. The memory of killing Hao stayed fresh in Yohken's mind, to the extent that he lost any conception of the passing of time, and didn't realize that 500 years had passed. Yohken came to believe that he needed to defeat a strong opponent to escape and became blinded by his guilt and pride that he managed to defeat the greatest enemy to the Asakura family. In the manga, when Yoh went to Hell to train, Yohken was his first opponent; Matamune notes that it is critical for Yoh to defeat Yohken, whose strength will reflect how powerful Hao was 500 years earlier, much like how the Ultra Senji Ryakketsu reflected Hao's strength 1000 years ago. Yohken regains his senses after Yoh defeats him, and relates the history of the Asakura family to Yoh. After Yoh leaves Hell, Yohken's soul returns with him to the deserted island of Tokyo and Yohken attend the last meeting between the Asakura and Tao families regarding their plan to defeat Hao. He makes one last appearance among the souls who escort Asanoha Douji to meet Hao.

Tamao Tamamura (玉村たまお, Tamamura Tamao)
Voiced by: Nana Mizuki (Japanese); Veronica Taylor (English)
Tamao Tamamura (known as "Tamara" or "Tammy" in the 2001 English anime) is a shy girl who is in love with Yoh Asakura, even though she knows that Yoh is engaged to Anna Kyoyama, whom Tamao admires. She is 11 years old at the start of the series. Initially, she is so shy that she uses her sketchbook and points to pictures in order to tell people what she wants to say; through Anna's influence and from combat, she gradually becomes braver and confident. Orphaned at a young age, she was brought to the Asakura family by Yoh's father, Mikihisa Asakura and trained as an ascetic priest. Right after Yoh and the others went to America, she began attending Shinra Private Academy. Tamao is named for Tamao Nakamura. Tamao's specialty is her use of a kokkuri board, which is similar to a Ouija board, in order to perform divinations. As an ascetic, her spirits are Konchi, a kitsune, and Ponchi, a tanuki, in the same way Mikihisa has a kitsune and a tanuki. At the conclusion of the manga, Tamao becomes the manager of Funbari Onsen, the resort that Anna planned to open after the Shaman Fight. Tamao also becomes the foster-mother of Yoh and Anna's only son Hana while they travel the world. Hana describes her as one of the scariest people he knows, implying that her personality is similar to Anna's. When Yoh and Anna finally return, Tamao is able to debut as an Enka singer and reveals that for the sake of Hana and to ensure Funbari Onsen would be successful, she forced herself to become stronger and more intimidating. She becomes infamous amongst the inn's employees for her ability to effectively threaten them while remaining elegant and cordial.
Luca Asakura
Voiced by: Ami Koshimizu

=== Tao Family ===
Tao Jun (道 潤) Chinese: Dào Rùn
Voiced by: Michiko Neya (Japanese); Lisa Ortiz (English)
Ren's older sister is a daoshi (a Daoist spellcaster; doshi (道士), Chinese: dàoshì), who can reanimate dead corpses. She is seventeen years old at the beginning of the manga. While Jun is loyal to her family, she expresses her greatest devotion and protective nature towards Ren and is willing to turn against the expectations of the Tao family in order to ensure Ren's success and well-being. She is one of the few people that Ren trusts and is aware of the brutality of his upbringing.

As a shaman, Jun's personal jiangshi (guardian zombie, pronounced "kyonshī" in Japanese) is Lee Pai-Long (Lee Bailong), a famous movie star in Hong Kong who died seventeen years ago. She uses Jufu talismans to control her guardian ghost. After she battles Yoh Asakura and Amidamaru and loses, she lets Bai-Long obey her commands only if he wishes to when she realizes that spirits have hearts too, and they just cannot be controlled. Using her skill in creating jiangshi, Jun later modifies Bailong's body after his defeat by Jun's father; the extent of the upgrades is revealed during Jun and Tamao's fight against Team Flower, where Bailong's arm is revealed to include a piston to greatly increase his punching power. Additionally, because of her knowledge in human anatomy, Jun willingly becomes the apprentice of Sati and gains the ability to resurrect people.

Tao Yuan (道円, Tao En) Chinese: Dào Yúan
Voiced by: Masashi Ebara (2001 series), Hideaki Tezuka (2021 series) (Japanese); Marc Thompson (English)
Tao Yúan is the father of Tao Ren and Tao Jun. In the 2001 English anime, he is introduced as Ren and Jun's uncle. A powerful shaman who commands an army of jiangshi, he initially appears as a giant man who is both sadistic and malevolent. Because of Yuan, both Ren and Jun had extremely painful childhoods, as they were exposed to bloodshed and death on a daily basis, as well as severe physical abuse. When Jun questions his actions relating to Ren, also asking him to set Ren free, he laughs and proceeds to "punish" her by sealing her in a dungeon for the ten days it takes Ren to return home after his fight with Yoh. To meet Ren, Yúan creates an army of jiangshi from freshly killed corpses which Ren disposes of with little difficulty. Ren is unable to defeat his father in combat and is locked up and tortured alongside his sister as punishment. When Ren's friends arrive to save him, their combined efforts tear Yuan to pieces. At the verge of defeat, Yúan's concentration breaks and it is revealed that his appearance is an illusion created by his Over Soul – he appears as an older greatly bearded-looking man very similar to Ren. He reveals the source of his obsession with the family doctrine is that he must bear the weight of two thousand years of Tao family souls (in a type of mortuary tablet armor) and reveals his second Over Soul, an oriental dragon with a head similar to his first Over Soul. Ren defeats his father and they have a small moment of revelation as Yuan passes him the Thunder Sword (Houraiken), a family heirloom. Yuan is shown as a much more enthusiastic father afterward, such as coming to the Patch Village and cheering Ren on during his team's match, much to his son's embarrassment. When Keiko and Mikihisa Asakura approach the Tao family with the offer to teach Team Ren the secrets of the Ultra Senji Ryakketsu in order to stand a chance against Hao, Yuan refuses to accept the offer out of pride unless the Asakura can prove their strength by defeating him; Mikihisa accepts the challenge and successfully overcomes him.

Tao Lan (道蘭, Tao Ran) Chinese: Dào Lan
Voiced by: Ai Satou (2001 series), Sayaka Kinoshita (2021 series) (Japanese); Megan Hollingshead (English)
Tao Yūan's wife, the mother of Ren and Jun, an incredibly strong shaman in her own right who taught Jun how to create and control jiangshi. As the heir to the main branch of the family, she was required to find a husband. After a formal marriage interview, qualified suitors were ordered to fight Lan; losers were made into jiangshi while the winners were sent home if Lan did not like them. When Tao Yuan, a member of a branch family of the Tao challenged her, he defeated her in one strike and she fell in love at first sight. She still loves him, though she questions his brutality towards their children from his obsession to ensure the family's success in the Shaman Fight and is secretly amused by his attempt to disguise his slight jealousy towards her two personal jiangshi, Shu (周) and Kyo (恭), because they are remarkably handsome. As a member of the Tao family, she arrives in the Patch Village and accepts the Asakura's offer to impart the techniques of the Ultra Senji Ryakketsu and participates in the meeting between the families on how to deal with Hao as the end of the Shaman Fight approaches.

Tao Ching (道珍, Tao Chin) Chinese: Dào Zhēn
Voiced by: Hidekatsu Shibata (Japanese); Stuart Zagnit (2001 series), Doug Burch (2021 series) (English)
Tao Ren's grandfather and former head of the family. He has a considerably more flexible and moderate attitude towards accepting help from the Asakura Family, commending Keiko's courage for approaching the Tao family although the secrets of the Ultra Senji Ryakketsu could be used against them and that the Tao family will not stray from their desire for revenge. He is later seen participating in the meetings between the Asakura and Tao families on how to deal with Hao as the end of the Shaman Tournament approaches.

=== The Patch Tribe ===
The Patch Tribe (パッチ族, Patchi-Zoku) are a group of Native American shamans who oversee the Shaman Fights, ten officials chosen to test and observe shamans while selling food and merchandise during the tournament. But the Patch Tribe's true purpose is to guard the selected Shaman King during their purification and gradual merge with the Great Spirit, the ten officials each guarding a specific part of the path to the Great Spirit's shrine known as a Plant, which embodies an aspect of nature. Despite their neutrality, some members of the Patch Tribe support Hao either because they recognize his worth or for their own agenda. Among the Patch tribe's techniques is a chant called the Patch Song (パッチソング, Patchi Songu), also known as the Song of the Patch, where the user enters a trance that increases their power and sense of duty as a Patch tribesman.

Goldva (ゴルドバ, Gorudoba)
Voiced by: Reiko Suzuki (Japanese); Ted Lewis (2001 series), Jodi Carlisle (2021 series) (English)
An elderly Patch tribe leader who is the organizer of the Shaman Fight, commonly mistaken for a male due to her appearance and voice. She is a god-class shaman and remains completely neutral throughout the tournament. Her spirit is a totem bird named Big Chief (ビッグチーフ, Biggu Chifu), the first chief of the Patch Tribe, with its medium being Goldva herself. Goldva later died after Hao fully merged with the Great Spirit, remaining by his side as a spirit.

Silva (シルバ, Shiruba)
Voiced by: Hikaru Midorikawa (Japanese); Dan Green (English)
A member of the Patch Tribe's Shaman Fight Selection Committee and overseer of the Glacier Plant whose spirit allies are the Silver Arms. Silva travels to Japan in the guise of a street vendor to test Yoh Asakura's worth to be in the Shaman Fight, hinting him on the means to manifest his Oversoul. Silva watches over Yoh afterward along with Ren and Ryu, often told that he is too emotional to be impartial despite being a capable officiant. As the descendant of Hao's second incarnation, Silva also possesses a personal desire to stop Hao in his third incarnation, which results in his attempt to discreetly aid Yoh as much as possible. But he is captured after his failed attempt to steal the Patch's remaining Elemental Spirits, brainwashed by the Patch Song into carrying out his duties as Officiant in protecting Hao before Yoh kills him. In the sequel Shaman King: Flowers, Silva is revealed to have a daughter named Alumi Niumbirch who inherited his Silver Arms spirits.

Kalim (カリム, Karimu)
Voiced by: Kazuhiro Nakata (2001 series), Eiji Hanawa (2021 series) (Japanese); Jonathan Todd Ross (English)
One of Silva's best friends and organizers of the Shaman Fight, overseeing the Highland Plant. Kalim oversaw Horohoro's test in the Shaman Fight along with Team Icemen. His spirit partner is a black bull named Black Sickle (ブラックシクル, Burakku Shikuru), with his shaman medium being a bull skull and spine bones allowing Black Sickle to merge with the lower half of his body. He mainly uses charging attacks like how real bulls would attack, either striking with a frontal attack or crushing them with powerful stomps. He shares an apartment with Silva during the tournament in Tokyo, where the two constantly bicker over the heat (because they cannot afford an air conditioner and the summer is so warm and humid). Like Silva, Kalim sells handcrafted Patch goods to make somewhat of a living while in Tokyo. Kalim frequently provides a voice of reason to somewhat quell Silva's desire to interfere in the Shaman Tournament. Because of his natural sense of caution, he does not suffer the same brainwashing as Silva and is able to remain one of Yoh and Horohoro's supporters, while quietly maintaining doubt towards the other officials siding with Hao. Kalim apparently has a fear of blood. Following the trend of Patch priests being named after metals, Kalim's name derives from Kari (加里 or カリ), or Kariumu (カリウム) meaning potassium in Japanese (derived from the German language Kalium).

Nichrom (ニクロム, Nikuromu)
Voiced by: Kentarō Itō (2001 series), Noriaki Kanze (2021 series) (Japanese); Sean Schemmel (2001 series), Aleks Le (2021 series) (English)
The 10th priest of the Patch Tribe who oversees the Cave Plant, Nichrom inherited his position from his brother, Chrom, the previous 10th priest, was killed by Tao Ren. In order to avenge his brother, he indirectly sides with Hao in order to let Hao's followers kill Ren as he oversees the ambush on Ren's team. While taking his brother's spirit ally, a locust called Purple Kick, Nichrom's own spirit is a scorpion called Yellow Whip (イエローウィップ, Ierō Uippu), whose is medium a scorpion's tail and forms an Over Soul of a scorpion with no legs fused into Nichrom's right arm. The stinger's length can change to attack opponents from a distance, though Yellow Whip's primary tactic is to use its scorpion pincers to immobilize opponents while its stinger strikes with "Dreaming Needle", which delivers a deadly poison that won't disappear unless the one who created the Over Soul dies. Purple Kick, which takes the form of a pair of insect-designed armored leggings, is said to be the fastest of all ten officiant spirit allies and can allow the user to move at speeds that even powerful experienced opponents can barely keep track of. It attacks with a powerful leg technique called "Dancing Insect".

Magna (マグナ, Maguna)
Voiced by: Satoshi Yamaguchi (Japanese); Ayman Samman, J. Michael Tatum (English)
An official of the Patch and overseer of the Volcano Plant who took Nichrom under his wing when the young boy became an official. He is the official responsible for Hao and Team Flower. He openly supports Hao, and like other officials who do so, takes pleasure in intimidating some of the remaining contestants in the tournament. His spirit is a great horned owl named Magnescope (マグネスコープ, Magunesukōpu), with his medium being placed on his arms and legs to generate owl wings and owl claws. When the invaders reach his Plant, he faces off against Tao Ren and tried to use the volcanic gasses to attack unseen like an owl. He is eventually killed by a gigantic lightning strike created by Ren.

Radim (ラジム, Rajimu)
Voiced by: Yasuhiro Mamiya (Japanese); Christopher Bevins (English)
The official and overseer of the Lake Plant who is selected to be the moderator of the tournament; because of the intensity of the fights, he constantly wears sunglasses capable of resisting extremely bright glares to maintain his sight. Unlike most of the other officials, he tries his best to remain neutral, but at times has openly agreed that he doesn't approve of Hao Asakura's shaman-only kingdom (going so far as to get Hao's furyoku rating during the fight with X-III). As a protector of the Shaman King, while he does not care about who becomes Shaman King, he is nevertheless a proud member of the Patch. His spirit is an Australian pelican named Platinum Sword (プラチナムソード, Purachinamu Sōdo), with his medium being his microphone. His Over Soul looks like a laser blade with which he apparently puts all his mana, allowing him to crush almost any opponent's Over Soul with one strike. The blade can split in two, acting like a pair of scissors representing how a pelican opens his beak. Though he tends to be outrageous with his commentary during the Shaman Fights, his martial arts skills and powerful Over Soul are the reasons why he was chosen to be the tournament's moderator, given the danger associated with being in close proximity to the participants. He is strong enough to take on all Five Grand Elemental Spirits and Faust VIII and is killed only when Yoh uses his furyoku nullification technique on Radim.

Namari (ナマリ) ("Lead" in the English manga)
Voiced by: Shohei Kajikawa (Japanese); Lucien Dodge (English)
The overseer of the Desert Glacier and official in charge of the three Gandhara teams, first appearing when Yoh's friends attempt to stop Hao's followers from killing Lady Sati. He apparently had some sort of discontent or rivalry with Ryu, though he also seems to respect him. He openly supports Hao, intimidating some of the remaining contestants in the tournament. Namari's spirit is a cobra named Red Rope (レッドロープ, Reddo Rōpu), with his medium (probably) having been snakeskin; the spirit's Over Soul forms a cobra head over Namari's hand and around his shoulders. Namari is able to move with great speed following the cobra head, which has poisonous fangs that can instantly kill opponents, while the tail can also strike at enemies. Red Rope also has a defensive "boa form" that wraps around Namari to soften the blows of his opponent. On their journey to get to the Star Sanctuary, Ryu fights with him first one-on-one in his area. After killing Ryu, he is in turn killed by Ren and Horohoro. Before he died, he smiles from knowing he'd won by having his boastful opponents use a part of their furyoku to defeat him. His name derives from the Japanese name for the element of lead.

Bron (ブロン, Buron)
Voiced by: Jiro Saito (Japanese); Raymond J. Lee (English)
The Patch Official who oversees the Valley Plant and oversees Lyserg Diethel's progress in the Shaman Fight. When Silva tries to steal the remaining four Elemental Spirits and is captured, Goldva orders Renim and Bron to re-educate him in the ways of the Patch, something Kalim seems shocked to hear. Eventually Hao is crowned the Shaman King by forfeit of the remaining three teams and his own two teammates. When the remaining teams invade the Plants and face off against Silva, Bron shows up alongside Renim and orders Silva to return to his Plant. Both he and Renim introduce themselves to the invaders and show off their Over Souls, possibly to intimidate them. Upon arriving at Bron's "Plant of the Valley", he easily defeats them all, until Lyserg Diethel calms his mind and burns him to death. His spirit is a spider called Blue Net (ブルーネット, Burū Netto) and his mediums are wrist and ankle cuffs made out of spider hair, forming a large spider Over Soul that appears fused to Bron's armor extending over his entire body to resemble a giant spider with Bron's head. His Over Soul allowed him to attach near-invisible spider threads throughout the cliffs of the valley, allowing him to create the illusion of flying while standing on the threads and detect the movements of opponents. The spider threads can also be used to create nets and used to pierce into opponents' bodies.

Renim (レニム, Renimu)
Voiced by: Akihiro Tajima (Japanese); Paul Nakauchi (English)
The overseer of the Jungle Plant who helps Bron in re-educating those who stray from the way of the Patch. Goldva orders Renim and Bron to re-educate Silva after his failed attempt to steal the remaining four Elemental Spirits and was captured, which they do so by repeatedly singing the Song of the Patch. After Hao Asakura is crowned the Shaman King by forfeit of the remaining three teams and his own two teammates, Renim and Bron appear briefly to order Silva back to his Plant and reveal their Over Souls as they greet Yoh and the invaders. Renim's spirit is a chameleon named Clear Coat (クリアコート, Kuriakōto). His Over Soul specializes in stealth removing any of his scent sound and presences allowing him to hide perfectly even in plain sight.

Thalim (タリム, Tarimu)
Voiced by: Kōji Okino (Japanese); Kenton Chen (English)
A Patch official who oversees the Beach Plant, first seen working in the Patch Cafe and responsible for the Kabbalahers amongst other teams. It is possible that due to name association he is Kalim's brother. Though he easily defeats the majority of the invaders using his versatile spirit, Green Seeds (グリンシーズ, Gurin Shīzu), which has access to the different properties and abilities of every kind of Plant on the planet, he is eventually overcome and defeated by Joco.

Rutherfor (ラザホー, Razahoo)
Voiced by: Hekiru Shiina (Japanese); Megan Hollingshead (English)
A Patch Priestess who oversees the Space Plant and escorts Hao to the King's Shrine, serving as his last line of defense while he merges with the Great Spirit. She wears an armored Oversoul created from her spirit ally Grey Saucer (グレイソーサー, Gurei Sōsā), the spirit of an alien that came to Earth more than a thousand years ago and provided the Patch with its technology. In her Over Soul state, Rutherfor can manipulate gravity for her attacks.

Chrom (クロム, Kuromu)
The first and only official to die in the preliminary rounds of the Shaman Fight and a close friend of Silva, regarded as one of the Patch's finest dancers. He was killed when he tested Tao Ren. Officially, Ren passed with one hit but when Chrom commented that Ren should train a little bit more, Ren went insane and killed him. His death drives Nichrom to seek revenge against Ren, who secretly feels deep regret for killing Chrom. Chrom's spirit is a locust, Purple Kick (パープルキック, Pāpuru Kikku). His medium was probably the armor-like plates on his vest. Seeing that his brother's Plant was the 7th Plant of the Cave, it was most likely Chrom's Plant to protect if he had survived.

Zinc (亜鉛, Jinku)
Voiced by: Susumu Chiba (Japanese); Andrew Rannells (English)
Zinc is a shaman of the Patch Tribe who appears in the 2001 anime only who, along with Nichrom, fights Kalim and Silva when they attempt to help Yoh Asakura. Due to the fact he is in the 2001 anime, he doesn't have a Plant. Like Nichrom he is given a power boost by Hao, while still possessing nine guardian ghosts to form a suit of spiritual armor. Like Silva, the spirits can also be combined into a Totem Pole Cannon much like the Silver Arms. His guardian ghost (most likely the first one he over souled) is a vulture or a buzzard with his medium being the feather plates he wore.

Lip & Rap (リップ & ラップ, Rippu and Rappu)
Voiced by: (Japanese); Erika Harlacher (Lip), Brianna Knickerbocker (Rap) (English)
Five year-old Twin sisters who Silva looks after; priestesses who are tasked to pass knowledge of Shaman Fight to future Officials and prepare the Shaman King candidate for purification before merging with the Great Spirit. When Hao awakens from his slumber, he took the girls' souls and kills them off instantly when they gaze upon him. But they were revived after Hao's defeat to serve as his intermediaries with the Patch Priests.

=== X-Laws ===
The X-Laws (X・法律, X-LAWS) is a paramilitary organization whose purpose is to eradicate all evil and suffering, founded by Luchist Lasso with the intention of defeating Hao Asakura. Each member holds a personal vendetta against Hao for ruining their lives in one fashion and utilizes Archangels (Arch-spirits) as spirit allies with supercars as mediums. Ultimately, Hao kills X-III early in the tournament and later X-II when they attempt to assassinate him. X-I survives long enough to join Yoh's assault on the Plants. In the 2001 anime, most of the other X-Laws die during their final assault on Hao after Jeanne's failed attempt to trap him in the Gate of Babylon.

==== Team X-I ====
The top members of the X-Laws.

Iron Maiden Jeanne in the 2001 anime

Iron Maiden Jeanne (アイアンメイデン・ジャンヌ, Aian Meiden Jannu)
Voiced by: Yui Horie (Japanese); Caren Manuel (2001 series), Veronica Taylor (2021 series) (English)
The nominal leader of the X-Laws, a girl with an iron will who is near-constantly contained within an iron maiden in a near-death state to raise her own furyoku level. She rarely leaves it unless she is desperately needed, believing her suffering will bring justice to the world. All the X-Laws are unquestionably faithful to her and revere her as a holy maiden. In reality, she was an orphaned French girl that Luchist and Marco found in Mont Saint-Michel, raised to believe she was a holy person destined to destroy evil. Despite her young age and fragile appearance, Jeanne is a god-class shaman and widely regarded as a contender to become Shaman King due to her high furyoku level. Though decisively ruthless, she is an innocent soul with a strong sense of justice and a sincerely kind heart. While Jeanne initially considered Yoh a threat due to being Hao's twin, accepting his offer to drop out of the Shaman Fight if she revives Ren, she becomes an ally to Yoh and helps in his final assault on Hao and the Plants until she runs out of furyoku, resurrecting the shaman fighters one last time. Several years after the Shaman Fight, she reformed the X-Laws into a non-profit organization known as X-Charity (X・慈善団体) and started a family with Ren. She later sends her son Men to stay at the Funbari Hot Springs to understand others with Blocken Meyer, Han Zang-Ching and Bill Burton as his bodyguards. Jeanne is later murdered by Yosuke Kamogawa, turning her against her will into the guardian ghost of Niaesu Bāji.

In the 2001 anime series, Jeanne leads the X-Laws in an attempt to open the Gate of Babylon to seal away Hao for good. But the attempt would fail, leaving her powerless when her guardian ghost, Shamash, is devoured by the Spirit of Fire.

Marco Lasso (マルコ・ラッソ, Maruko Rasso)
Voiced by: Akimitsu Takase (2001 series), Yūichi Nakamura (2021 series) (Japanese); Eric Stuart (English)
A shaman from Sicily who is captain of the X-Laws and answers only to Jeanne, being extremely loyal and protective of her while resolute in achieving her ideals of a world free of corruption and evil. In the past, Marco founded the X-Laws with his mentor, Luchist Lasso, who was also an entrepreneur and CEO of a highly successful supercar company. But Marco's life was ruined when Hao turned Luchist against him and destroyed the orphanage Marco grew up in, having since sought revenge. After entrusting Yoh and his friends to defeat Hao, Marco and Luchist fight to the death as Marco declares that he sees that true justice is love. His glasses are passed on to Lyserg, who later uses them as a medium for his Over Soul. In the spin-off Shaman King: Marcos, Macroh convinces Hao to let him remain a spirit so he can transcend into an angel.

In the 2001 anime series, Marcoh is devastated when Jeanne's attempt to destroy Hao by opening the Gate of Babylon but it failed. While the other X-Laws go to challenge Hao and avenge Jeanne's defeat and die in the process, Marco and lyserg become the only survivors, and he accepts Jeanne's decision to support Yoh against Hao in the final battle.

Lyserg Diethel

==== Team X-II ====
A trio composed of John Denbat, Porf Griffith, and Larch Dirac. After losing faith in Marco upon learning the truth behind the X-Laws, they decide to kill Hao by attacking his headquarters. When their attempt fails, their spirits are burned by Hao, which prevents them from ever entering Heaven or Hell. However, Denbat's decision to fire the XDI satellite alerts the world to the abandoned island of Tokyo where the Shaman Fight is taking place, forcing the Patch Tribe to conclude the Shaman Fight as soon as possible on the continent of Mu before ordinary humans discover the island.

John Denbat (ジョン・電場, Jon Denba) ("Dingbat" in the English manga)
Voiced by: Katsuyuki Konishi (Japanese); Aleks Le (English)
A former member of the SAS from England. In the manga series, being particularly bitter about Meene's death at Hao's hands, Denbat leads X-II's attempt to kill Hao after losing faith in Marco. Cursing Hao after realizing that Prof and Lucky are dead, Denbat is kept alive long enough for Hao to question why he would stand against Hao if he knew that his comrades would die in the process. Aware of the possible consequences, Denbat prepared a test satellite in space wired to his Archangel with a laser known as XDI and set himself as a target so that when it fired from orbit it would not miss Hao. When Denbat realizes he has survived the blast, Hao appears and praises Denbat's attack before incinerating his body. John is named after John Denver and Golden Bat cigarettes.

Porf Griffith (ポーフ・グリフイス, Pōfu Gurifuisu)
Voiced by: Takehito Koyasu (2001 series), Takumu Miyazono (2021 series) (Japanese); Ogie Banks (English)
A sniper from the United States Delta Forces. He is assigned to snipe Hao during X-II's attempt to kill Hao but is distracted when he notices Hao's tears and is impaled by the Spirit of Fire as he is telling Denbat and Lucky over the radio to flee. Porf is named after Hope cigarettes and the TVR Griffith.

Larch Dirac (ラーキ・ディラック, Raaki Dirakku)
Voiced by: Tomohisa Asou (2001 series), Kōsuke Takaguchi (2021 series) (Japanese); Zeno Robinson (English)
A former Delta Force member from the United States, who joins Denbat and Prof in their ill-fated attempt to kill Hao. After hearing a radio transmission of Prof being killed off, he attempts to run but is burned to death by Hao. Larch is named after Lark cigarettes and Cadillac cars.

==== Team X-III ====
A trio consisting of Venstar, Cebin, and Meene, who willingly fight Team Star during the tournament with full knowledge they would die in forcing Hao to reveal his method of using the Spirit Of Fire's power. Their souls and their spirits are consumed by the Spirit of Fire, though the X-Laws' gamble to force Hao to reveal his medium succeeds. But their deaths become a sore point for the members of X-II, who eventually act on their own to kill Hao.

Chris Venstar (クリス・ブンスター, Kurisu Bunsutā) ("Bunstar" in the early editions of the English manga)
Voiced by: Seiji Sasaki (2001 series), Tsuguo Mogami (2021 series) (Japanese); Matt Hoverman (2001 series), Anthony Brandon Walker (2021 series) (English)
A severe but kind man with a strong sense of duty who served in the Gulf War as a member of the American military's elite SAS team; he encountered Hao on the same battlefield where Hao found Mohamed Tabarsi. Venstar's unit was destroyed by Hao, with Venstar surviving but losing both his legs. The incident awoke his latent shamanic powers and he later met Marco at a field hospital and joined the X-Laws to take revenge. When both Meene and Kevin are killed by Hao, Venstar detonates a powerful X-Grenade to kill Hao by burning up all the oxygen in the arena. The attempt fails when Hao uses his Onmyōdō abilities to change the Spirit of Fire into water. Venstar is named after the Seven Stars cigarette brand.

Cebin Mendel (ケビン メンデル, Kebin Menderu) ("Kevin" in the English manga, "Sebin" in the English 2001 anime)
Voiced by: Wataru Takagi (Japanese); Eric Stuart (English)
A former sniper from the EKO Cobra Unit that aided the Austrian Federal Police, Cebin was badly burned by Hao with the Spirit of Fire when Hao was identified as a terrorist ten years ago and Cebin joined the X-Laws to seek revenge. As a result of his burns, he wears a mask and a large hat to conceal his disfigured burned face and his badly damaged body has been extensively replaced with mechanical prosthetics. His primary weapon is his artificial arms, which have long extending claws for combat and serve as his spirit's medium. He is the second member of X-III to be killed during their battle against the Hoshi-Gumi. His hobby is singing in a chorus and his favorite food is Sachertorte. Cebin is named after Cabin cigarettes and Gregor Mendel.

Meene Montgomery (ミイネ・モンゴメリー, Mīne Mongomerī) ("Minnie" in the early editions of the English manga, "Mina" in the English 2001 anime)
Voiced by: Tomoko Kawakami (2001 series), Mariko Nagai (2021 series) (Japanese); Michelle Newman (2001 series), Erika Harlacher (2021 series) (English)
A former member of the Canadian Special Forces's Emergency Response Team, Meene gave up her promising military career and joined the X-Laws after learning her father had been killed by Hao. Her unrelenting dedication to the X-Laws' mission is tempered by her sensitivity and belief that kindness is needed to save the world and not just blind justice. She enjoys swimming and, unknown to her, she is popular among the X-Laws' male members, who have created a secret fan club for her. In the manga, Meene is the first member of X-III to fall to Hao and killed when her soul is consumed by the Spirit of Fire. In the 2001 anime, she survives the failed attempt to open the Gate of Babylon and returns Morphine to Lyserg in hopes he will leave the X-Laws and not be killed as the surviving X-Laws attempt to kill Hao. Meene is named after "Mine" (峰) cigarettes and Lucy Maud Montgomery.

==== Hans Reiheit ====
Hans Reiheit (ハンス・ライハイト, Hansu Raihaito) ("Lihite" in the English manga)
Voiced by: Motoki Sakuma
The arsenal keeper for the X-Laws, is excluded from the main force because, despite his high ability, he is too belligerent. A caring man who enjoys the company of others, Reiheit proudly follows the ideals of Iron Maiden Jeanne. However, he believes that Jeanne not longer has the right to live after she joins the enemy and defects from the X-Laws to become a bodyguard for Mansumi Oyamada during the assault on the Shaman Fight's island location. Both Marco and Luchist consider him to be very dangerous because his spirit, Azazel, has a Reiyoku level of 470 000, though Reiheit's furyoku is high enough only to materialize Azazel for three seconds. He dies when his Over Soul is suddenly broken by Hao, though he is later resurrected and unexpectedly proposes to his colleague, the voodoo shaman Teruko Amano (天野 輝子, Amano Teruko). Reiheit is named after Hi-Lite cigarettes.

=== Gandhara ===
Gandhara (ガンダーラ) is a Buddhist pacifist organization that is participating in the Shaman Fight and iterate that their stance is that of neutrality. Led by Lady Sati, they are the third great faction in the current Tournament and are extremely powerful. However, because their chosen candidate became Shaman King during a fight 2500 years ago, they have no interest in winning the tournament and their ultimate goal is to prevent Hao Asakura from becoming the Shaman King. As such, they seek out the Five Grand Elemental Spirits who will wield the Five Elemental Spirits of the Patch Tribe in hopes that they will have the power to defeat Hao.

Nyorai (Tathāgata)

Sati Saigan (サイガン サティ, Saigan Sati)
Voiced by: Kotono Mitsuishi (Japanese); Erika Harlacher (English)
A serene and wise woman who leads the Gandhara, who revere and respect her as their princess and address her as "Her Highness." Though Lady Sati and the Gandhara do not approve of conflict or wanton destruction of life, they will not hesitate to use sufficient force to meet their objective as a last resort. She participates in the Shaman Fight in hopes of saving everyone and admits that she doesn't care who becomes Shaman King. Aware that she is unable to achieve this goal on her own, Sati believes that Yoh and his friends have the power to save the world because they are neither good nor evil in their intent to achieve their dreams. After recognizing Yoh and his friends as the Five Grand Elemental Spirits, she instructs her followers to send Ren's team to Hell to train while she personally approaches Yoh with the same intent. As a god-class shaman, her considerable furyoku is likely the closest to Hao Asakura; she possesses the ability to resurrect others and the strength to fight the greatest of the kings of Hell, King Enma, to retrieve the Spirit of Earth before delivering the elemental spirits to Yoh and his friends.
Before becoming a shaman, Sati came across a wooden statue of a thousand-armed Buddha (a Senju Kannon) at the Saigan Temple when she was a child and spoke to it on the injustices of the world. When land sharks attempted to throw her out of the temple unless she paid them, the statue broke open and Sati's spirit, Dainichi Nyorai, emerged to scare the land sharks away. Sati's background suggests that she is Sachi Saigan (西岸サチ, Saigan Sachi), the heroine of Takei's work, Butsu Zone, who is the incarnation of the Buddha Miroku foretold to awaken in the year 1999. She is named after the SATY supermarket.

Daiei (大栄)
An elderly Chinese man whose wisdom allows him to serve as one of Sati's advisers. Daiei is the oldest member of the Gandhara and cares greatly for Sati's well-being, following her wherever she goes and treating her with great reverence. He enjoys tofu cuisine and recites Buddhist sutras in his spare time. He is named for The Daiei, Inc.

Komeri (コメリ)
A young girl from India with beads in her white hair. She enjoys making long beaded necklaces in her spare time. Though she is the youngest member of Gandhara, Komeri possesses great potential, often training day and night, and loyally follows Sati wherever she goes. She is named for the Komeri Co., Ltd.

==== Myooh ====
Also known as the Wisdom Kings, the Myooh is a faction of Gandhara.

Jackson (寂尊, Jakuson)
A Chinese monk and the team leader for the Myooh, Jackson is a fierce follower of Lady Sati, willing to do anything to protect her ideals and will not tolerate anything that stands in her way. Unlike Yainage, he is relentless and extremely tough, regarded as one of the strongest members in Gandhara. As a member of the Myooh, he is permitted to use punitive force against opponents and like the rest of the Gandhara, he is capable of nullifying furyoku. After losing to Ren's team, the Myooh are assigned by Sati to send Ren's team to Hell to train and watch over their bodies until they are to be revived. Jackson later fights and defeats Izanami, one of the four Kings of Hell, to obtain the Spirit of Thunder. He is named for JUSCO.

Yainage (ヤイナゲ)
A Buddhist monk from India, recognized as the weakest member of the Myooh, though still a considerably difficult opponent to defeat because of his furyoku nullifying abilities. A composed man with confidence in his abilities, he loses his calm only after he is overwhelmed by Ren's power. After the Myooh are defeated by Ren's team, they are assigned to send Ren's team to Hell and protect their bodies until they return. Yainage later defeats Anubis, one of the four kings of Hell, to retrieve the Spirit of Rain. He enjoys birdwatching in his spare time and is named for the Inageya supermarket.

Cado (カドゥ, Kadou)
The third member of the Myooh, who possesses a cheerful and calm temperament. While he is the most easy-going member of his team, he is not to be taken lightly given his speed in combat in spite of his strange movements in battle. Cado is defeated by Horohoro, the last member of Ren's team to remain standing against their battle with the Myooh. With the other Myooh, the group protects the bodies of Ren's team while they train in Hell. He is later seen battling Mephistopheles, one of the kings of Hell, with some difficulty before obtaining the Spirit of Wind, as tasked by Lady Sati. He likes chicken curry and creating new fighting techniques. Cado is named for Ito-Yokado.

==== Ten ====
Also known as the Deva, they are a faction of Gandhara:

Mamy (マミ, Mami)
Formally known as Mami Matoba (的場 真美, Matoba Mami), Mamy is a young woman with freckles whose eyes are usually closed. Once an aspiring writer, she joined Gandhara after they saved her while she was traveling in India and teaches Japanese at Gandhara's schools. When she forms an Over Soul with her spirit Ashura, they wield the other seven Devas as weapons in combat. She is named for the Mammy Mart Corporation.

Samy (サミ, Sami)
Formally known as Hisami Toda (戸田 久美, Toda Hisami), Samy is a young woman with long hair and glasses. Like Mamy, she was saved by Gandhara while traveling in India. Once an aspiring soprano singer, she teaches music at Gandhara's schools. Her spirit partner is also Ashura and she forms the Over Souls required for the other seven Devas to transform into weapons for Ashura and Mamy to wield. Her name is a reference to Summit, INC.

Ozam (オーザム, Ōzamu)
Formally known as Osamu Kidomura (鬼道村 修, Kidomura Osamu), Ozam is an extremely large and towering man who wears a mask. He works as a security guard and physical education teacher at the Gandhara school, but apparently was a professional wrestler in the past and still competes on occasion in Japan. His spirits are the Nio, which use vajras as mediums. He is named for OZAM Co., Ltd.

==== Bodhisattva ====
Seikyou (清鏡, Seikyō)
A bald monk who has trained in martial arts as part of his family's tradition and is very protective of Lady Sati. Though he is a member of Gandhara, he is not a member of the participating teams in the tournament phase of the Shaman Fight. He descends from Taiwanese people whose paternal ancestors have included a Japanese priest in each generation. Along with performing covert activities while aided with spirits, he serves as a site manager for the Gandhara. His spirit is the Boddhisattva Marishiten and Seikyou uses a mirror as the spirit's medium. Seikyou is named for the Japanese term for Consumer co-op.

Aeon Lee (イオン・リー, Ion Rī)
A Gandhara shaman who wears a suit and tie, Aeon is a businessman who runs an advertising agency. Often seen riding an elephant that has accompanied Gandhara throughout the Shaman Fight, he is not one of the participating members of the group in the tournament round. Like the other members of Gandhara, he will not hesitate to do anything to protect Sati and will accompany her wherever she goes. He is named for AEON MALL Co., Ltd.

== Villains ==
=== Hao's followers ===
Consisting of powerful shaman recruited by Hao, they loyally follow him and his intention to create a world exclusively composed of the shaman. None of them will hesitate to eliminate any of Hao's opponents, though they will not oppose Hao's orders, especially if they attempt to kill Yoh and fear his ruthlessness. The strongest of the group are known as the 12 Apostles. Most are killed when Peyote betrays them, though they are resurrected shortly before the end of the Shaman Fight.

==== Team Star ====
Team Star (チーム「星組」, Chīmu "Hoshi-gumi") is the faction of Hao's followers that Hao personally leads.

Opacho (オパチョ)
Voiced by: Megumi Hayashibara (Japanese); Tara Jayne (2001 series), Laura Stahl (2021 series) (English)
A small child devoted to Hao and one of the 12 Apostles who is deceptively much more powerful than she seems because she survived a near-death experience shortly after birth. Found by Hao as a malnourished baby in South Africa, he adopted and raised her. Though he originally named her Ohachiyo (乙破千代) after the demon companion he met in his first life, she pronounced the name incorrectly as "Opacho" and the name stuck. While Opacho wore an orange pancho, orange headband, gold rings around her wrists and ankles, and was always barefoot, she does have a civilized outfit consisting of a white headband, jacket, jeans, and sneakers when having to appear in public. Possessing powerful but unrefined shamanic abilities, Opacho is capable of creating illusions and has the same mind-reading abilities as Hao and Anna do. Her spirit is known as Mama (ママ), who is not powerful, but can be used to create a sheep-like Over Soul with Opacho's hair, giving her great ramming power. Because of Opacho's straightforward and simple-nature, Hao allows her to accompany him and occasionally confides in her about his plans and what he thinks of Yoh and his power. In the 2001 anime, her faith in Hao becomes fear when she notes that Hao has made a change for the worse and flees from him. In the manga, Hao sends her as a messenger to coerce Yoh into returning to the Shaman Fight after he withdraws as per his agreement with Iron Maiden Jeanne to revive Ren. She later becomes part of Yoh's group as they attempt to defeat Hao as he is merging with the Great Spirit; her mind-reading abilities allow her to become a great ally to the group, helping them understand more about Hao. When Hao awakens as the Shaman King and kills Goldva, she is deeply upset that he is no longer the person she once knew, but she still expresses steadfast loyalty to him when Hao is confronted by the souls of everyone he has encountered.

Luchist Lasso (ラキスト・ラッソ, Rakisuto Rasso)
Voiced by: Katsuyuki Konishi (2001 series), Kenichirou Matsuda (2021 series) (Japanese); Andrew Rannells (2001 series), Bernhard Forcher (2021 series) (English)
Originally the founder and leader of the X-Laws, a group of holy warriors opposed to Hao, and the one responsible for finding Iron Maiden Jeanne, Luchist was defeated by Hao upon their first meeting. When Hao spared him, Luchist joined him as one of the 12 Apostles after losing faith in absolute justice upon realizing those who had been rejected by society had been forced to develop their understanding of justice. As one of the most powerful shamans under Hao, he is a rival to Marco, who was once Luchist's protégé and partner in developing supercars. The two shared a close relationship, but Luchist's defection from the X-Laws to Hao was a devastating blow to Marco. Described as having nerves of steel for his ability to stand comfortably by Hao's side, he is one of the few aware of Hao's ability to read minds. Though Luchist is one of Hao's followers, he is respectful and cordial towards others, including Yoh and Marco, and candidly straightforward. Luchist is named after Lucky Strikes.

==== Team Earth ====
Team Earth (チーム「土組」, Chīmu "Tsuchi-gumi") is the faction of Hao's followers that Peyote leads before it disbands following their loss against Team The Ren during the tournament.

BoZ Brothers (ボーズ, Bouzu)
Ryo Sugimoto Voiced by: Masaya Onosaka (2001 series), Tatsuhisa Suzuki (2021 series) (Japanese); Greg Abbey (both English dubs) (English)
Zen Yoneda Voiced by: Nobuyuki Hiyama (2001 series), Kishō Taniyama (2021 series) (Japanese); Dan Green (2001 series), Kenton Chen (2021 series) (English)
Known as the "Flying Zen Brothers" in the 2001 English anime, BoZ consists of two moderately popular rock star Buddhist monks Ryo Sugimoto (杉本 良, Sugimoto Ryō) and Zen Yoneda (米田 善, Yoneda Zen) (Ryo Kamishiro (神代 良, Kamishiro Ryō) and Zen Hijiri (聖 善, Hijiri Zen) in the anime; "Zen Hoshi" in the English anime). The duo is among the earliest shaman recruited by Hao and are not very strong. Their spirit allies are Chimimoryo (魑魅魍魎, Chimimōryō), the ghosts of thousands of small living things that they combine with pebbles to create their own Over Souls. After their initial attempts to eliminate Yoh before the Shaman Fight begins, they later appear as members of Team Tsuchi-Gumi. When Tsuchi-Gumi is defeated by Ren's team, the duo is possessed by Peyote's spirits and beaten by Joco McDonnell. They later leave Hao's group, hoping to achieve their dreams on their own rather than relying on Hao's power, and become allies to Gandhara.

Peyote Diaz (ペヨーテ・ディアス, Peyote Diasu) ("Tecolote" in the early editions of the English manga while "Ramiro" in the 4Kids English dub of the 2001 anime)
Voiced by: Mitsuaki Madono (Japanese); Dan Green (2001 series), Luis Bermudez (2021 series) (English)
Peyote is a Mexican mariachi shaman whose attire is homage to Dia de Los Muertos, using Calavera dolls as Over Soul mediums to channel the spirits of his mariachi band his guardian ghosts. Peyote is attracted to the darkness he saw in Hao's heart, having followed him on the notion he might be able to alleviate Hao's sadness as well as becoming one of his 12 Apostles. After being defeated by Ren's team, Peyote becomes disillusioned with Hao, despite continuing to feel a strong sense of attachment to him. He would later kill most of his comrades and then himself in an act of love/hate after learning of Hao's ability to read minds and that he never trusted his followers. Despite the assumption that he could not be revived due to the poor condition of his body, Peyote is forcefully resurrected by Hao and given a new spirit named Santa Muerte to protect him from his suicidal nature and anything else that Muerte deems as a threat to Peyote.

==== Team Moon ====
Team Moon (チーム「月組」, Chīmu "Tsuki-gumi") is the faction of Hao's followers that advanced to the second round of the Shaman Fights.

Hang Zang-Ching (范 斬陳 (ハン ザンチン), Han Zan-Chin) Chinese: Fàn Zhǎnchén
Voiced by: Yūji Ueda (2001 series), Tsuguo Mogami (2021 series) (Japanese); Oliver Wyman (2001 series), William Salyers (2021 series) (English)
An obese Chinese shaman whose guardian ghost is a giant panda named Shion-Shion (凶凶 (シオンシオン), Shion Shion) that forms an Over Soul with a golden Chinese gong. An explosives expert from Shanghai, China. He was born into a wealthy family of doctors, he wanted to become a famous pop idol. He was rejected for being obese which made him underconfident. Joining Hao in hopes of creating a world where physical appearances aren't important, he is a powerful fighter and impatiently ruthless. Zang Ching is the first to be killed during Peyote's betrayal but is later resurrected with the Hana-Gumi. After the conclusion of the Shaman Fight, he and Bill help Ren build a large electronics manufacturing company and they eventually become Tao Men's bodyguards.

Mohamed Tabarsi (モハメド・タバルスィー, Mohamedo Tabarusī)
Voiced by: Masahiko Tanaka (2001 series), Anri Katsu (2021 series) (Japanese); Oliver Wyman (2001 series), Ryan Colt Levy (2021 series) (English)
Also known as "Turbine" (ターバイン, Tābain), Mohamed Tabarsi is a youthful man who dresses concealing thawb robes who frequently leads his peers in battle and acts kindly towards his comrades. He had been a mercenary since his childhood and fought on the front lines protecting the weak while his country was invaded during the Gulf War; which he was surrounded by enemies and was about to die until Hao arrived and recruited him where he became one of the 12 Apostles. His guardian ghost is Djinn (ジン, Jin), contained in a golden heirloom lamp charm passed down for generations in his family, who will follow and protect Turbine no matter what. Djinn often combines with a glass shamanic medium on the back of his hand to fire a beam and can successfully grant any wish Turbine asks of him, though he can only grant one wish a day. During Peyote's betrayal, Turbine admits to developing doubts about Hao as well and cautions Peyote against acting rashly. Turbine was killed when he was shot in the forehead by Midori Tamurazaki (Mansumi Oyamada's main henchmen) while fighting Peyote. Because of his body too badly damaged, he could not be resurrected.

"Big Guy" Bill Burton (ビッグガイ・ビル・バートン, Biggu Gai Biru Bāton)
Voiced by: Yoshinori Sonobe (2001 series), Takahiro Fujiwara (2021 series) (Japanese); Michael Alston Baley (2001 series), Marc Thompson (2021 series) (English)
A gigantic football player and one of Hao's toughest followers, his spirits are the twenty-one members of his football team called The Big Guys (ビッグガイズ, Biggu Gaizu) who died in a terrible accident caused by one of Bill's scorned fans. He follows Hao as one of the 12 Apostles because Hao healed his injuries and gave a reason to live after his accident, though Bill expresses discomfort at the idea of killing ordinary humans. While he is killed during Peyote's betrayal, he is later resurrected. Along with Zang-Ching, he helped Ren build an electronics manufacturing company and eventually becomes one of Tao Men's bodyguards. In the 2001 anime, he dies shortly after joining in the final battle between Hao's allies and Yoh's friends, for his body could not survive his own recently increased power.

==== Team Flower ====
Team Flower (チーム「花組」, Chīmu "Hana-gumi") is an all-female faction of Hao's followers who all suffered being mistaken for witches. After being killed by Peyote and saved by Anna before Hao could feed them to the Spirit of Fire, Team Flower's members are revived and work at the Funbari Onsen alongside Tamao.

Kanna Bismarch (カンナ・ビスマルク, Kanna Bisumaruku)
Voiced by: Youko Soumi (2001 series), Saki Endō (2021 series) (Japanese); Caren Manuel (2001 series), Camden Singer (2021 series) (English)
A German shaman who originally came from an aristocratic family, Kanna was born constantly spewing ectoplasm which attracted spirits who were repelled by Ashcroft (アシュクロフト, Ashukurofuto), an old medieval knight spirit who has known Kanna since childhood. As her ally and protector, he uses the smoke from Kanna's cigarette as a medium to animate an empty suit of armor wielding a lance. Kanna lived a relatively comfortable and happy life until the death of her loving parents, after which she was surrounded by lawyers and relatives after her inheritance. When Hao found her, he burned down the castle and she became a shaman and one of his 12 Apostles in order to see the outside world. Kanna does not like children and is often seen riding a motorcycle and smoking cigarettes. After the Hana-Gumi are killed by Peyote, their spirits go to find Hao, believing he will help them but are horrified when he decides to feed them to the Spirit of Fire. They are saved by Anna and later resurrected; out of gratitude toward her, they eventually become waitresses at Funbari Onsen, where Tamao criticizes Kanna for smoking.

Matilda Matisse (マチルダ・マティス, Machiruda Matisu)
Voiced by: Tomoe Hanba (2001 series), Wakana Minami (2021 series) (Japanese); Erica Schroeder (2001 series), Erika Harlacher (2021 series) (English)
Nicknamed "Matti" (マチ, Machi), Matilda is a Northern Scottish druid who is always seen carrying a witch's broom and is loud and aggressive. Raised by a kind elderly woman regarded as a witch when everyone else rejected Matti for her spiritual powers, her hatred of humanity comes from how the people helped by foster mother's kindness did not come to save her when she was dying. Matilda met Hao who helped her bury the woman and she joined up with him as one of his 12 Apostles. Her spirit is Jack (ジャック, Jakku). In the 2001 anime, he is a Jack-o'-lantern-headed skeleton spirit inhabiting a pumpkinhead doll created by Matti. In the manga and the 2021 anime, Jack is actually the spirit of a killer who imitated Jack the Ripper and inhabits the knife that Matti arms her pumpkinhead doll with. Because he is scared of Hao's group, he does not attack them. The Hana-Gumi express strong devotion toward Hao, believing that they are the only ones who truly understand Hao, and refuse to accept Peyote's revelation that Hao actually trusts no one. After Anna saves their spirits from being devoured by the Spirit of Fire, they are resurrected. As one of the Funbari Onsen waitresses, Tamao criticizes her for the creepy hairstyle.

Marion Phauna (マリオン・ファウナ, Marion Fauna)
Voiced by: Michiko Neya (2001 series), Kei Shindō (2021 series) (Japanese); Carrie Keranen (English)
Known as "Mari", Marion is a gloomy Italian doll master in a Gothic Lolita dress and the daughter of a Camorra boss and his fortuneteller mistress. While the members of her father's group despised Mari and her mother, her father did not care and had sufficient power to let Mari have her way. When he was killed, her mother was killed attempting to flee with Mari. Then Mari was chased by her father's enemies until she was saved by Hao who unleashed the Spirit of Fire on them. Afterwards, Mari joined up with Hao as one of his 12 Apostles. Her medium, a gun-wielding doll named Chuck, was sewn together by her mother and accessorized with a valuable gun that belonged to Mari's father. The spirit who haunted the gun was a noble sharpshooting sheriff named Chuck (チャック, Chakku) and swore to protect Mari after she noticed his presence. In the 4Kids English dub of the 2001 anime, Chuck is referred to as "Baby Chuck", and he uses a rattle. In battle, Mari becomes extremely powerful when irritated and can telekinetically paralyze their opponents with the feelings of rejection they have lived with. After the Hana-Gumi is killed by Peyote and saved from being devoured by the Spirit of Fire by Anna, they eventually become waitresses at Funbari Onsen, where Tamao criticizes Mari for being too gloomy.

==== Hao's other followers ====
Boris Tepes Dracula (ボリス・ツェペシュ ドラキュラ, Borisu Tsepeshu Dorakyura)
Voiced by: Yasushi Ishii (2001 series), Ryōtarō Okiayu (2021 series) (Japanese); Oliver Wyman (2001 series), Bruce Wexler (2021 series) (English)
A shaman whose powers resemble that of a vampire, Boris is a descendant of Vlad the Impaler who was taught the secrets of the Ultra Senji Ryakketsu five hundred years ago by Hao. The knowledge was passed down through generations of Boris' family, who awaited Hao's return. However, the family grew to hate with humans who rejected them out of superstition despite the family's aristocratic status and Boris wishes to avenge his ancestors who were hunted as vampires. When Hao finally met up with him, Boris joined Hao's followers as one of his 12 Apostles. Boris' medium is blood and his Guardian ghost is Blamuro (ブラムロ, Buramuro), a former vampire hunter who despised the Tepes family but was overpowered by their knowledge of the Ultra Senji Ryakketsu. He also had ghostly vampire bats that were transformed versions of his ancestors. He is later killed by Marco before the Shaman Fight begins in the Patch Village and also despite Yoh's intervention. Boris and Kouji would later be revived as Boris planned to do a Dracula-type tourism.

Kouji Yamada (山田 光司, Yamada Kōji)
Voiced by: Sakaguchi Noriich (2001 series), Kousuke Takaguchi (2021 series) (Japanese); James Carter Cathcart (English)
Known as "Damayaji (ダマヤジ)" and bfore meeting Hao, he had been a photographer of ancient ruins and monuments though his only ability had been to photograph ghosts. Hao appreciated that Damayaji cared about the beauty of nature and recruited him. He does not like unnecessary cruelty and enjoyed drinking and eating king crab. Because he happens to resemble a hermit crab, he got along well with his guardian ghost which was the nature spirit of a red king crab. In the 2001 anime, the red king crab spirit was replaced with a centipede sirit. Kouji dies at the hands of his teammate Boris Tepes when his blood is drained and regarded as one of the weakest members of Hao's followers. After Kouji's death, his blood is used to power Boris' Over Soul. They both went to the afterlife soon after being killed. Kouji and Boris would later be revived. While continuing his photographer job, Kouji did suggest to Boris about an idea to do a Dracula-type tourism.

Brocken Meyer (ブロッケン・マイヤー, Burokken Maiyā)
Voiced by: Hiroyuki Yoshino (Japanese); Zeno Robinson (English)
A follower whose body has prosthetic blocks that allow his crippled and very short body to move and create an almost endless variety of Over Souls using rat spirits. After the infant Hao escaped from the Asakura family with the Spirit of Fire, he became Hao's adoptive father and raised him even after an incident where Brocken's limbs were burned off. Brocken often wears a red cloak to cover his block-like body. Among Hao's followers and the first of the 12 Apostles, Brocken is regarded as the group's manager, often delivering orders from Hao regarding everyone's next course of action. Brocken is often seen riding on the shoulder of "Big Guy" Bill Burton who was originally freaked out about Brocken's appearance as a talking toy until he saw his true appearance. He has survived numerous battles and is the only survivor among Hao's followers after Peyote's betrayal, while Brocken was found by Mikihisa Asakura, and was brought to the meeting between the Asakura and the Tao families to explain what occurred. Many years after the Shaman Fight, he becomes a bodyguard to Tao Men.

Anahol Pokki (アナホル・ポッキ, Anahoru Pokki)
Voiced by: Kōji Yusa
The younger brother of Anatel of Team Niles who was eliminated by the X-Laws. Anahol, much like Anatel, is vain and proud of his long nose, though Anahol expresses deep admiration for how Anatel's nose was more beautiful. Seeking to avenge Anatel by killing Iron Maiden Jeanne, he joins Hao, who enhances Anahol's power. Though Anahol succeeds in killing Jeanne and Lyserg when he attacks the car they are traveling in, Marco sends Tamao and Manta to find Lady Sati to revive them. He is later captured by Anna and forced to do her bidding, most notably altering his Over Soul to deliver the Elemental Spirits to Yoh's group and transport all the remaining shaman to the continent of Mu.

Ashil (アシル, Ashiru)
Voiced by: Kōki Miyata (Japanese); Marc Thompson (English)
A character that only appears in the 2001 anime and one of Hao's most faithful followers who is known as Basil in the English dub. His guardian spirit is an Ungaikyō named Siegfried (シュタウフェン, Shutaufen), and his Over Soul takes the form of a gigantic robot-like creature with a big mirror on its chest. He uses the earth as a medium and therefore can regenerate his over Soul as much as needed as long as he's on the ground. He has a major role in the 33rd episode, virtually his only appearance, in which he convinces Hao to let him fight Yoh and his friends. Hao orders him to kill "one or two" of Yoh's friends so that he becomes wiser and angrier. Bill Burton is sent along to keep Yoh himself from taking part in the fight and getting harmed. Even alone, Ashill fights Ryu, Horohoro, Ren, and Lyserg with ease. During the fight, he is the one to reveal that Yoh is a descendant of Hao. Eventually, after Yoh manages to break through Burton's defense and joins the fight, Ashil decides to use all his power to destroy Yoh and his friends, but he is unexpectedly killed by the X-Laws, who vaporize both him and his guardian ghost as Ashil calls out Hao's name.

=== Yosuke Kamogawa ===
The leader of Team YVS and acting antagonist of Shaman King Flowers, having acquired his wealth as a company CEO through his spirit ally YVS. He masterminded the destruction of the Patch Village along with the deaths of Yoh, Anna, and Jeanne. He uses cards to access YVS's powers, using them to age himself into an adult.

=== Niaesu Bāji ===
Also known as the Black Maiden, she is a member of Team YVS who acquires Jeanne as a spirit ally while tricked by Yosuke into believing her murdered Jeanne instead of hesitating.

== Other teams ==
=== Team Lily Five ===
Team Lily Five (リリーファイーブ, Riri Faibu) is a team of five female shamans who appear only in the 2001 anime series. Initially, they alternately attempt to hinder and take great advantage of Yoh and his friends as they attempt to find the Patch Village. However, Yoh seems to have no personal grudge against them and they eventually would later become friends with Yoh towards the end of the anime series. As with their corresponding shamans, the Lily Five's Guardian ghosts appear only in the 2001 anime and the Game Boy Advance game Shaman King: Master of Spirits 2.

Sharona (シャローナ, Jarōna)
Voiced by: Rumi Ochiai (Japanese); Megan Hollingshead (English)
Essentially the leader of the group, Sharona is a greedy woman who usually devises all the plans for her group. Before forming the Lily Five, Sharona had been abandoned by a child she took care of. Her ambition is to become famous as the Shaman Queen, which results in an argument with Anna Kyoyama, who has very similar designs. Despite her rude, bold mannerisms and somewhat calculating nature, she is good-hearted and actually quite clever. In the English adaption, her mannerisms are similar to a French socialite. Her Guardian Ghost is a pink smoke pixie spirit named Enra-Enra (Enla in the 2001 English anime) capable of shapeshifting into various objects and its shaman medium is Sharona's golden pipe.

Sally (サリー, Sarī)
Voiced by: Inuko Inuyama (Japanese); Dania Cericola (English)
The quiet tall redheaded Sally is the toughest and most impatient, of the group. She was rejected by her co-workers when her shamanic powers emerged. Though Sally speaks little, she is far from reserved – she becomes very outspoken and enthusiastic whenever an opportunity to fight arises. She also usually drives the five girls around in their red Lublin van, though Sharona and occasionally Ellie have done so as well. Her Guardian Ghost is a hammer spirit, Korogashi, and its medium is the golden rings on her fingers.

Millie (ミリー, Mirī)
Voiced by: Miyako Itō (Japanese); Amy Palant (English)
A sweet little girl, Millie is the youngest and smallest member of the Lily Five and is frequently seen in the company of Ellie. When her powers emerged, she was abandoned by her mother when she was little. as She and Ellie are the first to appear in the 2001 anime series in an attempt to thwart Yoh from properly qualifying for the second round of the Shaman Tournament by eliminating him before he faces Tao Ren. Millie tends to interact with Yoh's group more than the rest of the girls of the Lily Five and develops a small crush on Lyserg Diethel. Her Guardian Ghost is Onibi, who appears in the shape of a fireball with a face that resembles that of a fox, that merges with her slingshot merges with a crossbow.

Ellie (エリー, Erī)
Voiced by: Makoto Tsumura (Japanese); Kerry Williams (English)
A tomboy Valley girl, Ellie sides with Millie and is the first member of the Lily Five to appear before Yoh. The pair frequently work together and Ellie is usually the first to come to Millie's aid. Ellie comes across as superficial and shallow but cares about only her friends, especially Millie. When her shamanic powers emerged, Ellie was broken up with by her boyfriend who refused to hear ghost stories. Her shaman medium is her pink French nails and her guardian ghost is Kamaitachi, which is a pink sickle weasel Once merged with her pink nails, they become a bear-like claw that can extend long.

Lilly (リリィ, Riry)
Voiced by: Yui Horie (Japanese); Amy Birnbaum (English)
The quiet navigator and genius of the group, Lilly is a teenager who wears glasses, a brown sweater-vest with a short rolled-up sleeved white T-shirt with a long point neck collar, and a pleated tartan checkered skirt. When her powers emerged, she was bullied and ridiculed by her own classmates. Lilly speaks little, but when she does, it is a joke that responds to Ellie and Millie. Her Guardian Ghost is a Winter white dwarf hamster named Jangurian and her shaman medium is her own glasses. When her Over Soul is formed, Lilly is able to use her glasses, which will become a pair of white solid binoculars to help the group navigate.

=== Team Niles ===
Team Niles (ナイルズ, Nairuzu) is a team from Giza Egypt. They use the power received from ancient times as part of their shamanic abilities. Placed against X-Laws team X-I, Lyserg was given the order to defeat and kill them at all costs. However, a combination of both his and Morphine's hesitation allowed leader Anatel to release a deadly Over Soul that would kill him. With no other choice, Iron Maiden Jeanne released her full power, killing the group's leader with the spirit Shamash, and the other members with other torture devices.

Anatel Pokki (アナテル・ポッキ, Anateru Pokki)
Voiced by: Hirohiko Kakegawa (2001 series), Kōji Yusa (2021 series) (Japanese); Ted Lewis (2001 series), Ayman Samman (2021 series) (English)
Leader of Niles, regarded as a great friend by his teammates and deeply admired by his younger twin brother, considers himself to be the finest Egyptian shaman ever and wants to prove the greatness of Egyptian black magic. A former high government official, he is a descendant of an Egyptian pharaoh and the son of a millionaire whose fortune was built on foreign trade. Anatel wore a mask similar to the king Tutankhamun in battle and commanded one-thousand spirits as part of his Over Soul abilities. Anatel is named for pharaoh Anat-her and Pocky.

Khafre Puljiz (カフラー・プリツ, Kafure Purujizu)
Voiced by: Susumu Chiba (2001 series), Kohsuke Tanabe (2021 series) (Japanese); Zeno Robinson (English) (2021)
A slender shaman who wears an Anubis mask in combat, he considers himself the world's best mummy maker. He is a childhood friend of Anatel and works as an archeologist. Khafre serves as Team Niles' tactician and strategist in combat. His spirit is Kitka (キトカ, Kitoka), the mummy of an exceptional female Egyptian warrior and pharaoh's confidante, though her sarcophagus is destroyed by Lyserg before she is summoned. Khafre is named for pharaoh Khafre and Pretz.

Nakht Pitrah (ナクト・ピトラ, Nakuto Pitora)
Voiced by: Yūji Ueda (2001 series), Shogo Sakata (2021 series) (Japanese); Ogie Banks (English)
A large-set bald-headed man who wears a pyramid with a single eye in it for a mask. Stated to have access to unlimited Furyoku, but he does not have very much Furyoku though he recovers it quickly. He is one of Anatel's childhood friends and the former president of a travel agency. His spirit is a scarab beetle, who provides Nakht with exceptional defense. Nakht is named for Nakht and Nabisco's Picola.

=== Team Icemen ===
Team Icemen (アイスメン, Aisumen) is a squadron of shamans from the northern parts of Europe. Training and hardening their pride and duty through the cold, these shamans are notable for their teamwork, using each other's abilities to complement one another and defeat their opponents. They are Team Funbari Onsen's first opponent in the Shaman Tournament and their considerable pride is wounded when Yoh approaches them with complete confidence in his own team's abilities. Driven by the desire to prove their own worth, the revealed combined power of Yoh, Faust, and Ryu makes the Icemen realize who they were dealing with and leaving them humbler upon defeat. Because of their ice abilities, they easily befriend Horohoro, who later aids them when the Icemen are attacked by Hao's followers after their official defeat.

Pino Graham (ピノ・グレアム, Pino Gureamu)
Adult Pino Graham Voiced by: Susumu Chiba (2001 series), Shūhei Sakaguchi (2021 series) (Japanese); Christopher Kromer (2001 series), James Simenc (2021 series) (English)
Young Pino Graham Voiced by: Nana Mizuki
The leader of the Icemen, a druid from Ireland versed in the ancient Celtic techniques of the goddess Danu since childhood. His Guardian Ghost is Badb (バズヴ, Bazuvu), an Irish raven goddess that allows him to freeze anything. He is named for Morinaga's Eskimo Pino ice cream.

Zria Gagarik (ゾリャー・ガガーリク, Zoryaa Gagaariku)
Voiced by: Masako Katsuki (2001 series), Yuka Terasaki (2021 series) (Japanese); Rachael Lillis (2001 series), Carrie Keranen (2021 series) (English)
a Russian female shaman with no real name (and appears to be named after a Russian goddess), her abilities were awakened by psychic experimentation prior to the fall of the Soviet Union. Her Guardian Ghost is Vodyanoy (ヴォジャノーイ, Vojanōi), which allows her to release water against a target, usually to be frozen by Pino. Zria is named for the Zorya of Slavic mythology, as well as Gari Gari Kun ice pop's and Yuri Gagarin.

Tona Papik Cadimahide (トナ・パピク・カジマヒデ, Tona Babiku Kajimahide)
Voiced by: Hisao Egawa (2001 series), Kōji Ishii (2021 series) (Japanese); Michael Alston Baley (2001 series), Ayman Samman (2021 series) (English)
A powerful shaman from Iceland and a descendant of Vikings. His Guardian Ghost is a Viking warrior named Deht (デヒト, Dehito), which is used as the main physical muscle of the team as well as transforms into a massive ship for transport and combat. He is named for Papico ice cream products.

=== Team Kabbalahers ===
Team Kabbalahers is a team made up of the two Munzer children watched over by Mikihisa Asakura, Yoh's father, out of respect for their father Camel. A researcher working on a means to use spiritual power within a massive Golem he constructed, Camel was the last man murdered by Joco McDonnell (prior to meeting Orona and reforming into a comedian) and left the children with the Golem. Their desires are not just winning the Shaman Fight but revenge against the shaman who killed their father.

Mikihisa Asakura (麻倉幹久, Asakura Mikihisa)
Voiced by: Kenyu Horiuchi (Japanese); Ted Lewis (2001 series), Keith Silverstein (2021 series) (English)
Yoh's father, an ascetic shaman who is rarely at home and watches over his son from afar, as well as serving as a spy and messenger for the Asakura family. Yoh admits that he doesn't have a particularly close relationship with Mikihisa; in childhood, Yoh had hoped to become closer to his father by stealing Mikihisa's headphones and acquired his love of the musician Bob from listening to Mikihisa's music collection. Like his son, he is an easy-going man with a charitable personality, with a particularly strong sense of family, and is considerably more powerful than he appears. He is often referred to by his nickname, "Mickey (ミッキー, Miki)", which he also uses as a ring name in the Shaman Fight. Mikihisa's spirits are a kitsune and tanuki pair named Imari & Shigaraki respectively, who are vastly more powerful and respectable than Conchi and Ponchi and have achieved the rank of being mountain gods.
Before becoming a shaman, Mikihisa Maki (真木幹久, Maki Mikihisa) was an unemployed musician who aspired to be like John Lennon while living in an apartment with two other members of his band. He met Keiko Asakura while busking near a train station one night after she had been dumped by her boyfriend. She paid him ten yen to play a song for her and revealed that she was dumped because she could see ghosts. Keiko invited Mikihisa to her rented house, and their relationship started from there. It is noteworthy that the Asakura family had no male heir in Keiko's gene the family, following the Japanese muku no naru tradition; he took up the Asakura surname and allowed them to continue the family line. When the Asakura learned that Keiko was pregnant with twins, one of whom was the latest reincarnation of Hao Asakura, Mikihisa and Keiko made the difficult decision to go with Yohmei's plan to kill both children. However, Yohmei's hesitation resulted in Mikihisa moving to defend his father-in-law from an attack from the Spirit of Fire, which badly burned Mikihisa's face, after which he began wearing a mask to hide the scars. Blaming himself for failing to kill Hao when he had the chance, Mikihisa began a rigorous training regimen to make up for his incompetence and traveled around the world. During his travels, he met Tamao Tamamura, whom he took as an apprentice and often brought along with his training.
During the Shaman Fight, Mikihisa watches over Yoh, often shrouded in the shadows and observing Yoh's battles from the top of trees. He takes the responsibility of imparting parts of the Ultra Senji Ryakketsu to Yoh and his group, including the Shamanic Oracle (FumonTonkou) to Ren. Team Kabbalahers winds up being one of the top six remaining teams in the Shaman Fight main tournament, but they withdraw from the tournament during the decisive battle between Team Ren and Team Funbari Onsen, thus allowing both teams to qualify together with X-I and the Hoshigumi. Mikihisa's role in the 2001 anime is roughly the same as his manga counterpart, though he does not participate in the Shaman Fight.

Redseb and Seyram Munzer (ルドセブ & セイラーム ミュンツアー, Rudosebu & Seiraamu Myuntsuraa) ("Ludsev and Salerm" in the English manga)
Redseb Voiced by: Tomoko Kawakami (2001 series), Misuzu Togashi (2021 series) (Japanese); Erika Ishii (English)
Seyram Voiced by: Yui Horie (2001 series), Shino Shimoji (2021 series) (Japanese); Laura Stahl (English)
The children of Dr. Camel Munzer, under the care of Mikihisa and the controllers of Golem. Redseb is an energetic and eager young boy while Seyram is a solemn girl who is fiercely protective of her older brother. After the death of their father, Seyram was unable to express any emotion and spoke very little, which was caused due to her father's spirit possessing her. For the sake of helping Seyram, Redseb joins the Shaman Fight because he believes avenging their father will restore Seyram's heart again. They are killed after failing an attempt to kill Hao while he is integrating with the Great Spirit. Redseb's ghost is allowed to escape with the Spirit of Fire to Yoh's group as they journey toward Hao. Seyram's guardian ghost is her father, who possessed her and helped her give the massive amounts of Furyoku used to power Golem. Her other guardian ghost could be considered as her mother, who is the human around which Golem itself (as a giant Over Soul) was constructed – as Seyram operates Golem. Redseb's guardian ghost is as yet unknown. Both children are resurrected at the conclusion of the series and are adopted into the Asakura family by Mikihisa. Redseb eventually becomes a florist and the siblings are close to Yoh's son Hana. Redseb and Seyram are named for Mild Seven and Salem cigarettes respectively.

Camel Munzer (カメル・ミュンツアー, Kameru Myuntsuraa)
Voiced by: Katsuyuki Konishi (Japanese); Christopher Bevins (English)
The father of Redseb and Seryam and a close friend of Mikihisa. Upon the death of the professor, Mikihisa took the responsibility of looking after Redseb and Seyram and formed Team Kabbalahers to ensure the Golem created by Professor Munzer did not fall into the wrong hands after learning about its destructive capabilities. Professor Munzer becomes (in certain respects) his daughter's spirit ally, possessing her from time to time and giving her the massive amounts of furyoku it takes to power the Golem. He is named for Camel cigarettes.

== Other characters ==
Pirika Usui (碓氷ピリカ, Usui Pirika; "Pilika" in the 2001 English anime)
Voiced by: Tomoko Kawakami (2001 series), Rina Hidaka (2021 series) (Japanese); Rachael Lillis (2001 series), Brianna Knickerbocker (2021 series) (English)
Horohoro's little sister, who trains him in a similar manner to Anna's training of Yoh. Because Yoh defeated her brother, Pirika calls him a jerk upon meeting him, which upsets Yoh when he thinks about how people will hate him for destroying their chances of achieving their own dreams. Pirika has a lively and outgoing personality and is accomplished at domestic chores. Despite often expressing her irritation for her brother, she genuinely cares about him and supports his dream, being one of the few people aware that Horohoro's actual reasons for wanting to create a vast field of butterbur leaves are for the sake of his first love Damuko. Pirika later becomes friends with Anna and Tamao. "Pirika" means "pretty" and "pirka" means "good" in the Ainu language. She is born on February 9, 1987. Though not shown in the manga or anime, the author has stated that Pirika's partner spirit is Torara, a Marimo or Torasanpe as said in the Ainu language. Torara was said to have saved Pirika from drowning at an early age, and since then they became partners. Torara can manipulate water but is very shy, and for that reason, he did not make a debut in the manga or anime.

Mansumi Oyamada (小山田 萬純, Oyamada Mansumi)
Mansumi, age 55, is the father of Manta Oyamada and the owner of Oyamada Enterprises, a famous energy development company. He is extremely wealthy and ambitious, hoping eventually to expand his business into outer space. Mansumi's first appearance is relatively minor when he expresses harsh disapproval with Manta's determination to remain friends with Yoh after both Manta and Yoh are hospitalized following Yoh's fight against Faust. In a much later appearance it is revealed that he has been using Manta to track down the shamans, eventually bringing a large fleet of ships to the Shaman Fight's isolated island location to find the lost continent of Mu. The situation leads to a temporary union between the teams of Yoh and Hao, which ends when Hao single-handedly destroys nearly all the ships except the one Mansumi is on board due to a moment of weakness from Hao realizing he was facing people who are parents. After his defeat, Mansumi is captured and held hostage by Anna, who agrees to let him talk to Manta in private. Manta manages to convince Mansumi to allow him to remain on the island with his friends as everyone waits for the outcome of the plan to defeat Hao.

Keiko Oyamada (小山田 圭子, Oyamada Keiko)
Voiced by: Tomo Sakurai (Japanese); Erica Schroeder (English)
Keiko, age 37, is the mother of Manta Oyamada and the wife of Mansumi Oyamada. She has a slim build and average height, but possesses a shallow and superficial attitude; Manta rejects her when she asks Manta not to remain friends with Yoh because it would hurt the family's reputation to be seen with a spiritualist.

Mannoko Oyamada (小山田 まんの子, Oyamada Mannoko)
Voiced by: Ryō Hirohashi (Japanese); Erika Harlacher (English)
Mannoko is the daughter of Mansumi and Keiko Oyamada and Manta's sister, a severe girl who enjoys mocking Manta and, despite being only five years old, is a master with computers who runs the Oyamada Enterprises' software department. Both Mansumi and Mannoko share Manta's short stature.

Midori Tamurazaki (田村崎 緑, Tamurazaki Midori)
Voiced by: Shogo Sakata
One of the Oyamada family's employees, who is assigned to accompany Manta to America. While Tamurazaki does as Manta asks, his loyalties actually belong to Mansumi and he stays with Manta to spy and gather information on shamans for his employer in preparation for invading the deserted island of Tokyo where the Shaman Fight is taking place. He is cool and calculating even before most of Hao's followers, gunning down several of them with an M134 Vulcan after revealing that because he does not believe in souls he is not affected by the forbidden killing curse from the Ultra Senji Ryakketsu. He manages to disappear after Mansumi is captured by Anna.

Orona (オロナ)
Voiced by: Takaya Hashi (Japanese); William Salyers (English)
A South American Native American who was living homeless in New York City when he became Joco's mentor, convincing Joco to leave his gang and adopt his ideology of laughter being the best medicine to solving the world's problems. Though it made him a target of Joco's gang, Orona accepted his death due to his age and health issues with the knowledge that Joco would carry his legacy. Orona remained spirit to observe Joco's progress, making himself known after Joco died and guided him to Pascal Avaf.

Lilirara (リリララ, Ririrara)
Voiced by: Mami Koyama (Japanese); Erica Schroeder (2001 anime), Tinsel Korey (2021 anime) (English)
Lilirara, a member of the Seminoa tribe, is angry at the Patch Tribe and believes that the Patch Tribe massacred her ancestors. She tries to prevent the shamans of this present Shaman Fight from reaching the Patch Village, telling them that the Patch Tribe is really killers and that the same fate that befell the Seminoa will befall them. Hao later reveals that it was he, not the Patch Tribe, who killed the Seminoa. Hao then kills Lilirara right after Yoh's group departs for Patch Village, her spirit being among the many who offer help to Yoh's group against Hao in the final battle.

Lycan Usui (碓氷リカン, Usui Rikan)
The father of Horohoro and Pirika, who describes himself only as an office worker and is commonly referred to as "Oyaji" (meaning "old man") by his son. He adamantly believes that once his children leave home, he is no longer responsible for their well-being; however, he also hopes that they will become strong and does not care if they abandon their heritage to do so. During the Shaman Fight, Kalim brings him to save Horohoro when Horohoro is forced to fight against Blocken and Big Guy Bill to save the Icemen. However, Lycan elects to do nothing, revealing that he had come only because Pirika had begged him to and leaves the island on a makeshift raft right in front of Bill, who is overpowered by Lycan's spirit Gororo. Before he leaves, he repeats the creed that he has always told Horohoro – "the strong prey upon the weak" – but adds that those words do not mean one should give up. He is later captured by Mansumi Oyamada and brought abroad his ship as a prisoner. After he is freed, he appears at the barbecue held by the Asakura and Tao families and their allies, where he catches a tuna fish and waits with Pirika as Anna announces the final furyoku levels of Yoh and his friends.

== Guardian Ghosts ==
=== Amidamaru ===
Voiced by: Katsuyuki Konishi (2001, 2021, Flowers), Mitsuki Saiga (young, 2001 series), Akeno Watanabe (young, 2021 series) (Japanese); Sean Schemmel (2001 series), Kaiji Tang (2021 series), Erika Harlacher (young, 2021 series) (English)

A samurai who died during the Muromachi period 600 years ago, Amidamaru (阿弥陀丸) is Yoh's ghost companion. He is very powerful and wise but quite taciturn and extremely devoted to Yoh ("Yō-dono" in Japanese). He was greatly known around the town of Funbari, where he had died 600 years prior to killing several hundred other samurai soldiers during a battle. He is the original wielder of the legendary katana Harusame (春雨, Spring Rain), a sword forged by his best friend, Mosuke. The same sword is reproduced as a "spirit sword" and used by Yoh Asakura during the Shaman Fight while the original is kept in a museum. His name is based on the Buddha Amitābha, the principal figure in the Pure Land Buddhist sect. At the conclusion of the series, he becomes the guardian ghost of Yoh and Anna Kyoyama's son, Hana Asakura.

=== Bason ===
Voiced by: Shinpachi Tsuji (2001 series), Kousuke Takaguchi (2021 series) (Japanese); Frederick B. Owens (2001 series), Bernhard Forcher (2021 series) (English)

Bason (馬孫) Chinese: Mǎsūn is the ghost of an ancient Chinese military commander from the Han dynasty who serves Ren faithfully and obeys him without question. He refers to Ren as "Bocchama", which means "Young Master"; in the English version of the manga and anime, he refers to Ren as "Master Ren". Though Ren initially regards him as nothing more than an instrument to become Shaman King, Bason eventually becomes a valued and trusted friend of Ren. While he was noted for his bravery in life, he tends to be intimidated by Ren. Having bravely served the Tao family in life, he continued to follow them as a ghost and has sworn to serve Ren by any means possible. He carries a kwan dao, and in his days as an ancient Chinese warrior, Bason rode into battle on a horse named Hei-Tao; the spirit of Hei-Tao can be integrated into another horse kept by Ren, named Bái-Feng, to perform the Perfect Re-enactment of the Vorpal Dance. Bason is capable of adding tremendous strength and speed to Ren's Kwandao, and even making it quite larger, but also uses his body in attacks such as the Golden Punch. In Giant Spirit Form, Bason appears as a giant robot capable of launching fireballs. While Amidamaru specializes in fighting a single opponent, Bason excels in fighting a number of opponents at once. Like Ren, Bason appears very cold and cruel at the beginning of the series, however, following interaction with Yoh Asakura, Bason, like his master, begins to soften up and develop a much more pleasant disposition. He feels an overwhelming sense of duty to his master, even breaking down in tears when Ren is imprisoned by his father. While Bason and Amidamaru are very hostile and competitive at first, they soon become friendly rivals.

=== Kororo ===
Voiced by: Nana Mizuki (2001 series), Megumi Nakajima (2021 series) (Japanese); Erika Harlacher (English)

Kororo (コロロ) is a Koropokuru, known to the Ainu as the "little people who live under the butterbur leaves" and known as "Minutians" in the 2001 English anime, and is Horohoro's spirit partner. She is surprisingly cute and develops a slight crush on Manta Oyamada, but becomes jealous when Horohoro admires Morphine for her delicate features. Kororo's abilities allow Horohoro to create and manipulate ice. She is known as "Corey" in the 2001 English anime, which sounds similar to "Kōri (氷)", which is the Japanese word for ice and also the element that Horohoro's attacks are based on. In the KangZengBang chapters, it is eventually revealed that Kororo is the spirit of Tamiko Kurobe (黒部 民子, Kurobe Tamiko), a girl whose father was involved with the construction of a dam near Horohoro's village and was nicknamed "Damuko (ダム子)". She gave Horohoro his nickname and they formed a tentative friendship as they were both considered outcasts among their classmates. However, when Horohoro's grandfather told him to stay away from Damuko, Horohoro began to ignore her, though Damuko continued to hang out with him and hoped they would see the butterbur fields in the spring. However, when she suffered an accident trying to follow him one day, Damuko froze to death and Horohoro has blamed himself for killing the only girl he ever loved. When Horohoro reveals why he began ignoring her during his fight with Kalim, Kororo is able to briefly return to her true form as Damuko and explains how she became a Koropokkoru after her death in order to learn the reason why he broke off their friendship. Finally reconciled with Horohoro, she returns to her koropokkoru form and remains by his side.

=== Tokageroh ===
Voiced by: Wataru Takagi (Japanese); Wayne Grayson (English)

The spirit ally of "Wooden Sword" Ryu, Tokageroh (トカゲロウ, Tokagerō) is the ghost of an obscure bandit from 14th Japan with a reptilian appearance. Tokageroh raised in poverty by his mother with a survival instinct when she fed him parts of her body to keep him from straving, only to be killed by Amidamaru at the age of 35. Tokageroh's desire for revenge kept him from moving on before seeking his chance by possessing Ryu and having his men steal Amidamaru's Harusame before going after Yoh and Amidamaru. The fight that ensues forces Yoh and Amidamaru to break the Harusame in order to save Ryu's life. Yoh appeals to Tokagero and allows him to possess him instead of Ryu, who is just an innocent bystander because Yoh believes that Tokageroh is not as evil as he claims. Tokageroh does so, with the supposed intention of killing Yoh in the process, but finds he does not have the heart to and, after being touched by Yoh's trust in him, leaves Yoh's body peacefully. Tokagero eventually reforms and becomes the spirit ally of Ryu. After Ryu and Tokageroh train at Izumo, Tokageroh become an ascended spirit embodying Yamata no Orochi in his Oversoul Yamata no Orochigō" (O.S. ヤマタノオロチ号) and O.S. Sashimi Bōchō Susanorō (O.S. 刺身包丁スサノロウ; "Sashimi Carving Knife Susanoo") forms.

=== Eliza ===
Voiced by: Yuka Komatsu (2001), Kanako Takeuchi (2021) (Japanese); Lisa Ortiz (English)

Eliza Faust (エリザ・ファウスト, Eriza Fausuto) was Faust VIII's late wife whom he saved from a once incurable illness, working as a nurse despite her clumsyness. But she and the family dog Frankenstiney were murdered by a robber who broke into Faust's mansion, causing Faust to go insane as he dug up her skeletal remains to enter the Shaman Fight in an attempt to revive her. But Faust could only create an image of her in his "Oversoul Dear Eliza" (O.S.愛しのエリザ) before joining Yoh's group, with Anna summoning Eliza's spirit to be reunited with her husband as his Guardian Ghost. Faust adds his medical instruments with Eliza's skeleton in his Oversoul technique to give Eliza stronger forms as the demonic "Oversoul Mephisto-E" (O.S.メフィスト・Ｅ, O.S. Mefisuto-E) and the red-armored "Oversoul Eliza Operieren" (O.S.エリザ・オペリーレン).

=== Morphine ===
Morphine (モルフィン, Morufunn) (Morphea in the English manga and 2021 English anime, Chloe in the 2001 English anime) is a pixie-like poppy spirit who is Lyserg's spirit ally. She has served with Diethal family for several generations and is the family's most valuable treasure. Despite her delicate appearance, she is merciless when it comes to protecting Lyserg and is capable of driving his pendulum at high speeds. As Lyserg's best friend and most loyal protector, she silently worries about his obsessive mission to avenge his family. She loves eating sweet-tasting things and would like to become friends with Kororo, the other nature spirit in Yoh's ground, though it seems the friendship is unlikely. In the 2001 anime, Morphine is absorbed by Archangels to assume her "Giant Over Soul" form. Her original name was edited for being a reference to morphine.

=== Mic ===
Mic (ミック, Mikku) is a jaguar spirit who is Joco's guardian ghost, a very old and powerful nature spirit despite appearances. Though jaguars have been impulsive and known to attack enemies and rivals without mercy, Mic has gradually calmed down over the years and become a gentle and kind animal. He used to belong to Joco's mentor. His name is a takeoff of "Mick Jagger". Whether as a guardian ghost or as a supporting comedian, he is very supportive of Joco and extremely valuable as a spirit who is able to collect information due to his smaller size and natural feline caution.

=== Pascal Avaf ===
Voiced by: Eri Kitamura

Pascal Avaf (パスカル・アバフ, Pasukaru Abafu) is the second Guardian Ghost of Joco, a wise Olmec spirit who becomes a mentor Joco after the youth was brought to him by Orona while within the Great Spirit. He was once a powerful shaman that participated in the Shaman Fight a millennium ago before he was killed by Hao, deified by his people. He is capable of merging with Mic and Joco to form the Armour Over Soul 'Jaguarman', he teaches Ren, Horohoro, and Lyserg on how to form Armour Over Souls as well. Like Gandhara and the Asakura and Tao families, he has been guiding the Five Grand Elemental Spirits with the hope of finally defeating Hao.

=== Silver Arms ===
Silver Wing Voiced by: Masaaki Ōkura (2001 series), Takumu Miyazono (2021 series) (Japanese); Greg Abbey (2021 series) (English)
Silver Horn Voiced by: Kanji Suzumori (2001 series), Takumu Miyazono (2021 series) (Japanese); Sean Rohani (2021 series) (English)
Silver Tail Voiced by: Toshitaka Shimizu (2001 series), Takumu Miyazono (2021 series) (Japanese); Keith Silverstein (2021 series) (English)
Silver Rod Voiced by: Yuka Komatsu (2001 series), Takumu Miyazono (2021 series) (Japanese); Erica Schroeder (2021 series) (English)
Silver Shield Voiced by: Shinji Kawada (2001 series), Takumu Miyazono (2021 series) (Japanese); Doug Birch (2021 series) (English)

Silver Arms (シルバーアームズ, Shirubā Āmuzu) are a quintet of familiar spirits that have refined themselves for over 500 years, serving as spirit allies for Silva by usually forming armor during his Oversoul with alternate weapon formations like the Totem Pole Cannon or the Flesh and Blood Spear. The main representative of the Silver Arms is Silver Wing (シルバーウイング, Shirubā Uingu), an American bald eagle spirit whose grants his user wings and shoulder armor for flight and to cut through opponents' Over Souls. The other members include the American bison spirit Silver Horn (シルバーホーン, Shirubā Hōn) and the coyote Silver Tail (シルバーテイル, Shirubā Teiru) who leg arm, the coral snake spirit Silver Rod (シルバーロッド, Shirubā Roddo) that serves as a whip, and the gopher tortoise spirit Silver Shield (シルバーシールド, Shirubā Shīrudo) who can reflect enemy attacks. After Silva's death, his daughter Alumi inherits the Silver Arms from him.

=== Ponchi and Conchi ===
Ponchi Voiced by: Kenyu Horiuchi (2001 series), Takumu Miyazono (2021 series), (Japanese); Andrew Rannells (2001 series), Sean Rohani (2021 series) (English)
Conchi Voiced by: Tsutomu Kashiwakura (2001 series), Noriaki Kanze (2021 series) (Japanese); Eric Stuart (2001 series), Keith Silverstein (2021 series) (English)

Ponchi and Conchi (ポンチ & コンチ, Ponchi and Konchi) are a bake-danuki with large testicles (it was replaced with a large stomach in the English manga) and a kitsune fox spirit who are the familiars of Tamao Tamamura. Both Ponchi and Conchi are remnant spirits of an elite, yet Frivolous Daimyo of Japan, and a perverse Salaryman. They had just taken Tanuki and Kitsune forms respectively. While comforting them in horrendous ways, they also spoil them. At one point, Conchi had agreed to do a Lincoln commercial wherein he advertised a car. He spoke in a very low register, deep, "sexy" voice. Suggestive voice. When Tamamura heard it one day, she began sweating so profusely, his voice was so arousing. Masura and Mita could not for the life of them, figure out it was him. Mita even turned around, confused, asking, "Conchi?". After it was revealed to be his voice in the commercial, a shiver was sent down everybody's spine. Another time, Masura saw a nice heart decoration on T.V. A broken heart. As it turns out, they were a pair of lips. Ponchi's lips. Complete with impurity, imperfection, and dizziness. They've done some crazy things over the years. After Masura and Mita grow up, and relocate to the Island of Magic, Ponchi and Conchi's roles dwindle, as they are used as spies or comic relief. Ponchi eventually becomes Lucas' guardian spirit, although this doesn't work out so well. Both Ponchi and Conchi wear Mawashis; in the manga, it is because they were frightened into doing so by Matamune. The pair are two of the many guardian spirits of the Asakura family and are four hundred years old, but extremely vulgar and egotistical. When Manta's cousin, Masura, visits Conchi and Ponchi, after her parents are killed in a Shaman Fight, she appears to be riddled with anxiety, crying and shaking uncontrollably. She also worries about her sister. Conchi, in his attempts to help her, tells her not to worry about it. He also comments, about how "bad her anxiety was when he first met her". In an attempt to help cute Masura, Conchi informs her of he and Ponchi's "elite status as spirits". He also tells her, she is his "best friend", and how she can summon his full attention, just by calling him. He does this while still wearing his erotic mawashi. Well, it isn't long before he says something inappropriate, grossing her out. Ponchi, on the other hand, takes care of little Masura's younger sister, Mita. He calms her, while she tells her thoughts through a vision. While this is happening, he advises her, not to become anxious, and sad, admitting how goodhearted and "pure" he and Crazy Conchi are. As he says this, his revealing mawashi "kkkrrrk!"s. Ripping. His thing does not fit. Anyhow, irrelevance aside, he promises his "bestie" that he will look after her, and if she needs anything, they are there. Later, they are seen smoking outside. Masura feels awkward around them, and would much rather have Imagari, as her guardian spirit. Matamune is seen yelling at the two, for being provocative around Masura, and her sister. Manta is seen fleeing. Ponchi is revealed to have offered illegal medication to Masura. For her anxiety. Because the Asakura family has many considerably more powerful spirits at their disposal, Ponchi and Conchi have been free to act as disobediently as they want. They are cowardly and easily frightened by anyone who proves to be powerful and intimidating, especially Anna and Matamune. Despite being nuisances, they have not been sealed because they have proven themselves to be useful for tasks like spying, reconnaissance, casting curses, and simple (though not completely accurate) divinations. In combat, Conchi is able to form a bow and arrow Over Soul with Tamao's planchette while Ponchi combines with her planchette to form a cushioning shield Over Soul.

=== Matamune ===
Voiced by: Hideyuki Tanaka (Japanese); Greg Chun (English)

Matamune (マタムネ) is a Nekomata, a type of cat spirit with two tails; he also carries around a pipe with him and wears a necklace with three bear claws (which later is owned by Yoh Asakura). He has served the Asakura family for a millennium, although he spends much of his time traveling the world. He professes to have seen everything and is almost constantly reading books. One thousand years ago, Matamune had been an ordinary but sickly cat that had been abandoned by his mother and his eight other siblings had died. Hao had sensed the cat's strong spirit and fearlessness despite being able to see the terrifying spirits around him. Matamune soon became Hao's faithful companion and true friend. When Matamune died, Hao turned Matamune's spirit into a Goryoushin, a special type of spirit employed by Onmyouji to guard against demons and other spirits that would seek to harm them. Hao also imbued Matamune with a portion of his own furyoku – a type of mana – using the Bear's Claw Necklace. This mana allowed Matamune to have a physical body, and so long as Matamune's furyoku was not used up, his physical body would continue to exist. When Hao was driven mad by his abilities, Matamune sided with the Asakura family to defeat his master. Upon Hao's rebirth five hundred years later, Matamune joined Yohken Asakura to kill Hao in the Shaman Fight. However, Matamune holds himself responsible for what happened to Hao, believing that his loss of faith in Hao was part of the cause of Hao's madness and deeply regrets fighting against Hao. As such, Matamune has spent the last thousand years searching for a way to atone, and to save Hao. When Yoh went to meet Anna Kyoyama for the first time, his grandfather, Yohmei summoned Matamune to accompany him. Matamune and Yoh became good friends, and Matamune taught Yoh a number of things. Matamune resolved to help Yoh save Anna – who also had the power of reishi (spirit's sight), the ability to telepathically read hearts (a power which had ultimately led to Hao's madness) – partly as an act of penance for not being able to save Hao a thousand years ago. This power of empathy drove Anna to become withdrawn and distrustful and manifested into dangerous Oni (demonic ogres) that eventually turned on her, often terrorizing and threatening to destroy her. Matamune exhausted the remaining furyoku given to him by Hao in order to give Yoh the necessary power to save Anna. Though doing so meant that Matamune would no longer be able to retain his form, he believed that Yoh had the power to save Hao. In their farewell, Yoh promised Matamune that one day he would become strong enough to be able to summon Matamune once again and has since worn the bear claws that belonged to Matamune as the symbol of that promise. Though Yoh and Hao have not seen Matamune since, Matamune later appears in Hell, observing Yoh's encounter with Yohken from afar and then becoming Ren and Horohoro's guide in Hell. He elects not to join the gathering of spirits who confront Hao after he becomes Shaman King, which Yoh reasons are because Matamune did not wish to fight Hao again. Matamune's character appears to have been inspired by Kenji Miyazawa's Night on the Galactic Railroad, which he is seen reading volume 19. The 1985 animated film adaptation of Miyazawa's work depicts the main characters as cats, similar to Matamune, who is seen frequently travelling on trains during his appearances in Shaman King.

=== Mosuke ===
Voiced by: Hisao Egawa, Kumiko Watanabe (young) (2001 series), Masakazu Morita, Satomi Kobashi (young) (2021 series) (Japanese); Michael Alston Baley (2001 series), Sean Rohani (2021 series) (English)

Mosuke (喪助) is amaster swordsmith whose ability to create swords matched Amidamaru's ability to wield them. He and Amidamaru were best friends and grew up together. Their deaths resulted from Amidamaru's refusal to kill Mosuke when their lord ordered the samurai to. Mosuke, who believed that his delay in completing Harusame was the reason why Amidamaru died, spent the next six hundred years haunting the sword he had crafted for his friend until Yoh and Manta revealed that Amidamaru's spirit had continued to wait for him at Funbari Hill. He is later summoned to reforge Harusame after it is broken during the confrontation with Tokagero. In the 2001 anime, Mosuke later becomes Manta's guardian ghost, semi-trapped in Manta's laptop, and forms an Over Soul with the form of a hammer.

=== Lee Pyron ===
Lee Pyron in the 2001 anime

Voiced by: Nobutoshi Canna (2001 series), Tooru Sakurai (2021 series) (Japanese); Dan Green (both series) (English)

"The White Dragon"; Lee Pyron (李白竜, Ri Pyron) Chinese: Lee Bai Long (Lee Pai-long in the 2001 English anime) was a Kung Fu movie star who was murdered by the Tao family to be Jun's Jiangshi bodyguard. He is a thinly-veiled reference to the late Bruce Lee, who died under suspicious circumstances. Lee Pyron was born on November 29, 1948, and died mysteriously at the age of thirty; his body disappeared after his funeral. Technically, he is not a spirit, but a living corpse reanimated using Tao Jun's "ofuda". However, he can be considered to be serving a similar purpose, since he serves Tao Jun and hangs around her perpetually. It is later revealed that Lee Pyron was murdered to be Tao Jun's guardian Jiangshi. Once he becomes self-aware again, he forgives Jun for what her family did to him and becomes very protective of her. While Jun appreciates his dedication, she is somewhat dismayed that he tends to knock down any young men who try to get to know her. Throughout Pyron's life, he devoted himself to training and perfecting his martial arts, regretfully at the cost of neglecting his wife and son. Lee Pyron's master, Shamon (Shao-lin in the 2001 English anime), founded a variation of the Chāolín ("super forest") Temple Style (a parody of Shaolin) which he named "Ruichong-quan kung-fu" (Eijuken in the 2001 English anime). Shawen's Ruichong-quan became the basis of Pyron's style, the Dǎodàn-do (dǎodàn is Chinese for "missile"), which combined Boxing, Muay Thai, and Karate. Before Pyron died, he intended to create a perfect version of it and he intended not to pass it on until he finally perfected it; however, he died before he could complete his art form. Various Daodan Do moves include Fu chong Hong Zha si (dive bomber, a series of matrix-like flips), followed by Hong Zha Jiao (Bomb kick, a thrust to the face using the right leg) or the Dao Dan Jiao (rocket kick, a sudden thrust to the body with the legs). To increase his power, Jun performs various modifications on his body, including extendable limbs, which he utilizes against the Hana-Gumi's Guardian ghosts. In battle, he fights without Jun controlling him; instead, she uses her talismans to enhance his abilities in combat.

=== Zanki and Goki ===
Zenki and Goki (前鬼& 後鬼,) are a pair of shikigamis that resemble Oni and were created by Hao with the Genma Choboku to protect the Ultra Senji Ryukketsu (Tome of the Shaman). Anna defeats both of them and claims them as her own, using them as her muscle. Zenki is the blue shikigami, with eye sockets in the shape of the "Seven Star Tree of Renewal" used as the crest for the Asakura family, and is skilled in mêlée combat and carries a shield. The red shikigami, Goki, has one eye in the center of "Five Point Star" shape used as Hao's symbol and wields a large battle axe in combat. In the manga, Anna is able to enhance them and form an Over Soul with them using the 1080 beads as a medium. Kouki is eventually destroyed when Anna uses it to defend herself and the Hana-Gumi from Hao's Armour Over Soul. In the 2001 anime, Hao retakes control of the Shikigami duo to hold Yoh's friends at bay at the conclusion of the end of the anime series, though the Shikigami were soon destroyed.

=== Imari and Shigakari ===
Imari and Shigakari (イマリ & シガラキ) are a pair of Yamagi (山神), mountain gods who are over a thousand years old and serve as Mikihisa's spirit partners. Their Over Souls are formed from using stones as mediums and they are considered skillful and powerful fighters. Imari is a kitsune who was once an evil nature spirit but became a helpful guardian spirit after being defeated by the Asakura family. She is intelligent and noble, and excels in transformations, particularly into a human woman; however, despite her feminine mannerisms, nobody is certain whether she is actually female. Shigaraki is a tanuki spirit who was found by an Asakura shugensha in a Buddhist temple and convinced to leave, becoming the shugensha's guardian spirit. He also specializes in transformations but is less skilled than Imari. They were both given names 300 years ago by a member of the Asakura family who enjoyed tea ceremony and found their fur reminded him of Imari porcelain and Shigaraki ware. The duo is both high-class spirits who cannot be compared to Conchi and Ponchi and hate any sort of comparison made. Imari & Shigaraki aid Yoh when he confronts the X-Laws after he is coerced by Hao into returning to the Shaman Tournament.

=== Gororo ===
Gororo (ゴロロ) is the Guardian Ghost of Lycan Usui, the father of Horohoro and Pirika. Gororo is a Koropukuru, but unlike the others, he is about the size of a human. Because of his unnatural size, he had been shunned by other Koropokkur. However, he is kindhearted and strong and possesses a great deal of Reiyoku. He is first seen when Horohoro is protecting the Team Icemen from Hao's followers. Gororo is also responsible for training Damuko's spirit to become a Koropokuru when she refuses the Koropokuru's request for them to lead her into the afterlife.

=== Shamash ===
Shamash (シャマシュ, Shamashu) is Jeanne's god-class spirit, the Babylonian god of law who established ancient laws regarding justice, war, and the seasons. Its reiryoku is 520,000. The spirit was found in a sacred place within an old church during one of the X-Laws' pilgrimages and became Jeanne's spirit when she broke the spell that sealed him there. Due to his apathy for the human world, he rarely acts and his presence around Jeanne is sufficient to instill respect. In combat his incredible power allows him to manifest different torture tools depending on the medium used, which includes parts of Jeanne's armor and her iron maiden. Jeanne also has the means to resurrect others by having Shamash kiss them. In the 2001 anime, Jeanne is able to open the Gate of Babylon in an attempt to seal away Hao using Shamash's power. The attempt ends in failure as Shamash was devoured by the Spirit of Fire. In the manga, Shamash and Bason eventually become the guardian spirits of Men.

=== Golem ===
The Golem (ゴーレム, Goremu) is a machine that functions like Spirit of Fire in that it ingests spirits to get stronger and the spirits are contained in a battery of sorts with a reiryoku level of at 550 000. It belongs to Redseb and Seyram, and it was built by their deceased father, Dr. Camel Munzer. Primarily operated by Seyram, the Golem can be summoned remotely by a special command and is part of Team Kabbalahers, though primarily so that Mikihisa can keep the machine from falling into the wrong hands after he learned of its powerful destructive capabilities. Though it's a machine, Camel Munzer used the spirit of Redseb and Seyram's mother to empower the golem as a machine OS. After Dr. Munzer's spirit regains his senses and is sent to the Great Spirit, Anna modifies the Golem so that she and the Munzer children can use it against Hao. Golem may be based on the Golem from Jewish mythology. In the 2001 anime series, he belongs to a family of shamans.

=== Ohachiyo ===
Voiced by: Tomokazu Seki (Japanese); James Simenc (English)

Originally a human, Ohachiyo (乙破千代) is a demonic spirit who roamed around for 200 years before meeting Hao when he went by the name Asaha Douji (麻葉 童子) in his first life. He became Asaha's first friend after the death of his mother, Asanoha Douji, and nicknames him "Mappa Douji (麻葉 童子)" based on an alternate reading for the characters of his given name. A carefree and cheerful creature, he teaches the young Asaha many things and tries to quell the child's hatred of humans. But when a corrupt priest tries to kill Asaha as a scapegoat and appease the local people, Ohachiyo integrates his spirit with Asaha to give the boy the means to fight back. When Asaha exhausts his furyoku while still integrated with Ohachiyo, the demon's spirit is absorbed into Asaha, leaving Asaha with his reishi mindreading ability forever. As Yoh draws closer to his goal of defeating Hao and understanding his brother, he sees Ohachiyo in a vision; not knowing the spirit's name, he mistakenly refers to the spirit as "Z" after seeing the similar-looking kanji "乙" on the demon's garment. Ohachiyo would later manifest within the Great Spirit after Hao merged with it, helping Yoh's group give Hao closure.

=== Asanoha Douji ===
Voiced by: (Japanese); Tinsel Korey (English)

Asanoha Douji (麻ノ葉 童子) is Hao Asakura's mother in his first life who possessed the ability to see spirits, possessing a strong will and gentle heart. She was killed by the local villages when accused of being a kitsune, her death being the reason for Hao's strong hatred for ordinary humans. Since becoming a shaman, he has hoped to find his mother's spirit again but his mind-set prevented him from realizing she was at his side the entire time. Asanoha is brought before Hao by Anna within the Great Spirit, convincing her son to let go of his hatred for humanity.

=== Daikyoh Oboro ===
Voiced by: Kentarō Itō

=== Namaha ===
Voiced by: Chihiro Ueda

=== Great Spirit ===
Great Spirit (グレート・スピリッツ, Gurēto Supirittsu) (G.S.) (King of Spirits in the 2001 anime)

The strongest and most ancient spirit that contains various afterlife realms with in, being an aggregate of souls from which all life is derived and returns to with the exception of earthbound spirits. Only shamans with a strong can directly gaze upon the Great Spirit, as those who are too weak either fall into an eternal sleep or are driven insane from visions of the planet's memories. Like the Five Grand Elemental Spirits, it has domain over its element – any aspect of the universe it retains. When it forms an Over Soul with the Shaman King, it can create a small star that emits an unbearable quantity of heat, making it very difficult to remain in close proximity for extended periods, as well as a black hole to pull everything into oblivion. Because the Great Spirit contains all the memories of the planet itself, those who become Shaman King gain absolute knowledge, allowing the reshaping of the world entirely according to the Shaman King's will.

=== G8 ===
The God 8 (GOD8, Goddo 8), or G8 (G8, Jī Eito), are a group of spirits who held the title of Shaman King in the past before Hao became their latest member.

YVS (ヤービス, Yābisu)
The previous Shaman King before Hao who is an antagonist in Shaman King: Flowers, YVS is a pyramid-themed spirit who is responsible for creating the world's current capitalist society. He is the most vocal of the G8 in hating Hao and is determined to maintain the status quo he established on Earth during his tenure as Shaman King at any cost.

=== Archangels/Arch-Spirits ===
The Guardian ghosts of the X-Laws, which only Jeanne can present to their human partners. In the manga, it's revealed that they aren't actually angels, but spirits of cars made by Luchist using a fragment of angelic spirits and contained in the ammunition of a gun; Yoh describes them as being similar to tsukumogami spirits from Japanese legend. Many of the cars inspired by Marco's own knowledge of cars, being a former car salesman and developer. In the 2001 anime, they were all combined into Morphine, near the finale, when all the members of the X-Laws fell by Hao's hands.

Michael (ミカエル, Mikaeru)
The Archangel Marco Lasso commands, the spirit of a 1992 Ferrari Testarossa treasured by Marco. The archangel is regarded as the closest to God and regarded as the king of angels, a brave archangel who leads the angels to war. Luchist summoned the ghost of the actual Michael to merge with the car to create Marco's guardian ghost; though it does not compare to a true angel, the spirit is powerful enough to be regarded as a god-class spirit. Michael is contained in a fully automatic Beretta 93R pistol.

Zeruel (ゼルエル, Zerueru)
The Archangel presented to Lyserg Diethel after he had proved his loyalty to the X-Laws, a nimble and swift spirit. In the 2001 anime series, Lyserg abandoned his original guardian ghost in favor of the more powerful Archangel; in the manga, he retains Morphine and Zeruel as guardian spirits. After training in Hell, Lyserg is able to have Zeruel and Morphine combine to form his Armour Over soul, Mestema Dolkeem. Zeruel is the spirit of a blue Lotus Elise contained in a derringer.

Raphael (ラファエル, Rafaeru)
An archangel commanded by John, the spirit of an Aston Martin DB4 contained in the ammunition of a grenade launcher. During his final attempt on Hao, John uses his connections with the British government to gain access to a military defense satellite, which John uses as a medium for Raphael to fire upon Hao's location.

Sariel (サリエル, Sarieru)
An archangel commanded by Porf, the spirit of a Porsche 911 housed in a Remington 700.

Uriel (ウリエル, Urieru)
An archangel commanded by Larch, the spirit of a Ford GT40 kept in a bazooka.

Gabriel (ガブリエル, Gaburieru)
An archangel commanded by Meene, the spirit of a Giulietta SZ contained in a Luger P08 pistol, known as the angel seated on God's left. Though Gabriel possesses a high defense, it is better suited for shooting from a distance and best used in a supporting role rather than in face-to-face battles Because Meene overestimates Gabriel's defense, the angel is instantly destroyed when she attempts to fire point-blank at Hao.

Metatron (メタトロン, Metatoron)
An archangel commanded by Chris, the spirit of a Hummer H1 that Venstar drove during the Gulf War and is kept in a rocket artillery launcher. An archangel stronger than Michael, it wields a shield and morning star and possesses an incredible destructive power befitting its tough structure.

Remiel (レミエル, Remieru)
An archangel commanded by Cebin, the spirit of a 300SL Coupe contained in specially built guns resembling human forearms. Known as the messenger charged with guiding souls to Heaven and delivering divine visions, it has the power of thunder. The angel is lightweight and attacks by emitting electrical charges from Cebin's hands. Because of Cebin's calm demeanor, neither of them loses their cool in battle and Remiel's outstanding speed and strength allow the creation of a stable Over Soul.

Lucifer (ルシファー, Rushifā)
The first archangel to be created, commanded by Luchist Lasso and regarded as a fallen angel. It is the spirit of a Lamborghini Countach LP400, a car with great value to Luchist and known for its speed and power. It is contained in a Comp Hunter revolver.

Azazel (アザゼル, Azazeru)
Another fallen angel commanded by Hans Reiheit. It is the spirits of tanks from World War II and is contained a Steyr AUG. The spirit is regarded as highly dangerous because its Reiyoku level at 470 000 is higher than that of the Spirit of Fire's Reiyoku of 300 000. However, Reiheit's lower furyoku level means that he cannot materialize the spirit for more than three seconds and suffers a considerable backlash if his Over Soul is broken.

=== Buddhas ===
The Guardian ghosts of the Gandhara. Unlike the X-Laws' Archangels, the Gandhara spirits are genuinely divine, deriving from the Buddha. All of them are stronger than the Spirit of Fire.

Dainichi Nyorai (大日如来)
The Buddha commanded by Lady Sati, nicknamed Senju (センジ). He became Sati's partner after he emerged from the statue of a thousand armed kannon to save a young Sati from land sharks at the Saigan Temple. He affectionately calls Sati "Sacchan". One of the largest Buddhist gods among the Gandhara, he primarily uses his mighty palms in combat and his Reiryoku is 700,000. His appearance in his spirit form, along with his background and relationship to Sati, is a reference to Senju from Takei's earlier work, Butsu Zone.

Jizou Nyorai (ジゾウ如来)
The Buddha commanded by Daiei. Its Reiryoku is 650,000. His spirit form resembles the character Jizo from Takei's work, Butsu Zone.

Batou Nyorai (バトウ如来)
The Buddha commanded by Komeri. Its Reiryoku is 650,000. Similar to other members of Gandhara, he resembles the character Batoh from Takei's work, Butsu Zone.

Acala (不動明王, Fudō Myō-ō)
The Buddha commanded by Jackson. Its Reiryoku is 400,000 and uses a vajra as its medium. According to Pascal Avaf, the spirit rules over the Three Passions of Buddhism: wrath, greed, and sloth. Acala wields a personal sword known as Bankoken that will place a person into a deep sleep from which they cannot easily wake from when the person is cut. The spirit also holds a chain that will hunt down any spirit, regardless of its speed. In its Over Soul form, Acala resembles the character "Fudou" in Takei's work, Butsu Zone.

Kundali (軍荼利明王, Kundali Myō-ō)
The Buddha commanded by Yainage, possessing a Reiyoku of 400 000. Its primary abilities involve palm strikes that nullify any furyoku based attack and defense and follows the movement of Yainage as he wields a vajra used as the spirit's medium.

Rāgarāja (愛染明王, Aizen Myō-ō)
The Buddha commanded by Cado. Its Reiryoku is 400,000. In Over Soul form, the spirit is armed with a bow and arrows, relying on its six arms to fire multiple shots or rapidly strike with its many palms. Arrows fired by Ragaraja will follow and strike down any spirit, regardless of speed. The spirit's medium is Cado's cell phone.

Ashura (アシュラ)
The Buddha commanded by Mami and Sami, its Reiryoku is 400,000. As one of the Eight Deva Guardians of Buddhism, the Over Soul he forms with Mamy as a medium allows them to wield the other seven Devas as weapons, which provides them with a wide arsenal of techniques in combat. However, his evil passion is described as being incredibly strong, making it difficult to form an Over Soul with him. He is based on Senju's rival in Takei's work Butsu Zone.

Nio (仁王)
The Buddhas commanded by Ozam, known individually as A-gyō (阿形) and Un-gyō (吽形), the two wrath-filled muscular guardians of the Buddha. Each has a Reiyoku of 25,000.

Marishi-ten (マリシテン)
The Buddha commanded by Seikyou. Its Reiryoku is 400,000 and uses a mirror as its medium.

Shatora (シャトラ)
The Buddha commanded by Aeon Li. Its Reiryoku is 400,000. Its medium is Aeon's necktie.

=== Five Grand Elemental Spirits ===
Regarded as the sacred treasures of the Patch Tribe, the Five Grand Elemental Spirits (五大精霊, Godaiseirei) were said to have been created by the Great Spirit and can only be controlled by a powerful shaman. Each of the High Spirits is capable of becoming stronger by consuming the souls of others and retains all their memories. After Hao Asakura, in his second incarnation as a Patch member, steals the Spirit of Fire, the Patch become highly protective of the remaining four spirits. After Silva's attempt to steal the spirits and hearing of Gandhara's plan to take the remaining spirits for the shaman they have recognized as the Five Grand Elemental Spirits, the Patch hide the spirits in Hell, where they are each protected by one of the Four Kings of Hell. The spirits are later retrieved by Lady Sati and Gandhara's strongest members so they can delivered to Yoh and his companions for their final fight against Hao.

==== Spirit of Fire ====
The Spirit of Fire (スピリット・オブ・ファイア, Supiritto obu Faia) (S.O.F.) is Hao's guardian ghost, an elemental spirit that Hao stole from the Patch Tribe during his second life 500 years ago. Its power was initially greatly diminished because of its journey back from Hell (where Hao negotiated the terms of his reincarnations with Taizan Kuzun, the god of the dead), forcing it to regain its strength by consuming other souls and spirits. The spirit's flames serve as Hao's way of killing off shamans who failed him or those who refused to rally for his cause and has accompanied him from his second incarnation to his third. It's Reiryoku 330,000. Its primary medium is the oxygen in the air, allowing Hao to manifest the Spirit of Fire with incredible speed. Using Onmyōdō magic, Hao can alter the nature of the Spirit of Fire into any of the five elements (fire, water, wood, metal, and earth). It can shower the enemy with magma with a temperature exceeding 1,200 °C (2,192 °F), and can also launch a large amount of fire into the air as a defensive move. As Hao enters a deep sleep to merge with the Great Spirit, he sends the Spirit of Fire to Yoh's group to become Lyserg's guardian ghost.

In the 2001 anime, Hao ultimately deems the Shaman Fight to be a pointless contest and moves to acquire the Great Spirit by force. After fighting through various obstacles, the Spirit of Fire consumes the Great Spirit itself, being reborn in a golden hue ten times its previous size.

==== Spirt of Earth ====
The Spirit of Earth (スピリット・オブ・アース, Supiritto obu Aasu) (S.O.E.) is the elemental spirit that gives life to plants and creates metal. It can generate gravitational forces to attract any object towards itself, which is a highly effective defensive move as protection from forces as great as large meteors. It later becomes the guardian ghost of Yoh Asakura.

==== Spirit of Thunder ====
The Spirit of Thunder (スピリット・オブ・サンダー, Supiritto obu Sandou) (S.O.T.) is a spirit that can create powerful electrical charges up to 1 500 000 000 kW and 100 million volts from black clouds to strike opponents and generate magnetic fields to defend. It is strongly associated with Taoism and becomes the guardian ghost of Tao Ren.

==== Spirit of Water ====
The Spirit of Water (スピリット・オブ・レイン, Supiritto obu Rein) (S.O.R.) is the elemental spirit with an unlimited amount of holy water. It can create large massive icicles and by combining its power with the power of the Spirit of Wind it can even make violent freezing winds. The spirit becomes the guardian ghost of Horohoro.

==== Spirit of Wind ====
The Spirit of Wind (スピリット・オブ・ウインド, Supiritto obu Uindo) (S.O.W.) representing the Aztec symbol of the Eagle warrior that slices the wind with its wings, the Spirit of Wind is incredibly swift, peaking at 120 m/s with a pressure of 900 hPa, and can destroy any debris that runs into its path. It becomes the guardian ghost of Joco McDonnell.

== Reception ==
Lori Henderson from Manga Life commented that "everyone has a reason for fighting, even the villains, so even if you don't like a character, you do understand them." Writing for Active Anime, Holly Ellingwood praised "the differing styles of the shaman fighters" and the "appealing characters designs overall."
