= Taoyuan Subdistrict =

Taoyuan Subdistrict may refer to the following locations in the People's Republic of China:

Written as "桃园街道":

- Taoyuan Subdistrict, Zhuozhou, Hebei
- Taoyuan Subdistrict, Xuzhou, in Quanshan District, Xuzhou, Jiangsu
- Taoyuan Subdistrict, Tonghua, in Dongchang District, Tonghua, Jilin
- Taoyuan Subdistrict, Tongchuan, in Wangyi District, Tongchuan, Shaanxi
- Taoyuan Subdistrict, Pingyuan County, Shandong
- Taoyuan Subdistrict, Rongcheng, Shandong
- Taoyuan Subdistrict, Gujiao, Shanxi
- Taoyuan Subdistrict, Tianjin

Written as "桃源街道":

- Taoyuan Subdistrict, Shenzhen, in Nanshan District, Shenzhen, Guangdong
- Taoyuan Subdistrict, Nanchang, in Xihu District, Nanchang, Jiangxi
- Taoyuan Subdistrict, Changchun, in Nanguan District, Changchun, Jilin
- Taoyuan Subdistrict, Dalian, in Zhongshan District, Dalian, Liaoning
- Taoyuan Subdistrict, Ninghai County, Zhejiang
