= 2005 in video games =

2005 saw the release of many sequels and prequels in video games, such as Grand Theft Auto: Liberty City Stories, Tony Hawk's American Wasteland, Resident Evil 4, Black & White 2, Brothers in Arms: Road to Hill 30, Devil May Cry 3: Dante's Awakening, Mario Kart DS, Mario & Luigi: Partners in Time, Myst V: End of Ages, Need for Speed: Most Wanted, Prince of Persia: The Two Thrones, and WWE Smackdown! vs. Raw 2006, alongside prominent new releases including Brain Age, F.E.A.R., Forza Motorsport, Dinosaur King, God of War, Guild Wars, Guitar Hero, Nintendogs, Onechanbara, Shadow of the Colossus, Trauma Center: Under the Knife, Madden NFL 06, NBA Live 06, NBA 2K6, and Sniper Elite.

The seventh generation of video game consoles also began with the launch of the Xbox 360, while the Nintendo DS launched in PAL regions.

The year's best-selling video game worldwide was Gran Turismo 4 for the PlayStation 2. The year's most critically acclaimed title was Resident Evil 4 for the GameCube and PlayStation 2.

== Legend ==
Video game platforms
DS	Nintendo DS, DSiWare, iQue DS	GBA	Game Boy Advance, iQue GBA	GCN	GameCube
LIN	Linux, SteamOS	MOBI	Mobile phone	OSX	macOS
PS2	PlayStation 2	PSP	PlayStation Portable	WIN	Windows, all versions Windows 95 and up
XB360	Xbox 360, Xbox 360 Live Arcade	XB	Xbox, Xbox Live Arcade		

== Financial performance ==
In 2005, the total U.S. sales of video game hardware, software and accessories rose 6% over 2004 to $10.5 billion USD ($9.9 billion, 2004) breaking 2002's $10.3 billion record for the industry.

The increase is largely due to the portable game market which counterbalanced sluggish console game sales. Delays, hardware shortages, and anticipation of next-generation video game consoles have been cited as reasoning for slow sales for both console games and console hardware. Console games and hardware dropped by 12% and 3% respectively.

The portable market of the video game industry rose to $1.4 billion, the second time sales broke the $1 billion mark in the industry's history. Mostly due to the release of the Nintendo DS and the PlayStation Portable in North America, sales for portable hardware rose 96% over 2004. Although the release of the Nintendo DS and the Sony PSP aided in spurring growth in the portable market, the Game Boy Advance still represented 62% total portable software units sold and 52% of total portable software dollar sales.

Computer games continued its trend and declined by 14%, dropping from $1.1 billion in 2004 to $953 million. Although sales did decrease, NPD claims that playing games on the PC is actually increasing through a variety of different mediums including online websites and MMO subscriptions.

=== Best-selling games by region ===
Worldwide

Best-selling video games worldwide in 2005
Rank	Title	Platform(s)	Sales			
Rank	Title	Platform(s)	Japan	United States	Europe	Worldwide
1	Gran Turismo 4	PS2	1,066,749	1,500,000+	Unknown	5,000,000+
2	Madden NFL 06	PS2, XB, GCN	3,250	4,430,000 (Note: 2.95 million on PlayStation 2. 1.2 million on Xbox. 280,000 on GameCube.)	Unknown	4,433,250+
3	Nintendogs	DS	965,665	Unknown	1,600,000	4,190,000+
4	Pokémon Emerald	GBA	319,837	1,700,000+	1,200,000	3,219,837+
5	Mario Kart DS	DS	836,478	Unknown	800,000	3,000,000+
6	Resident Evil 4 (Biohazard 4)	GCN, PS2	591,379	Unknown	Unknown	3,000,000
7	Star Wars: Battlefront II	PS2, XB	—N/a	1,567,000+	500,000+	2,067,000+
8	Pro Evolution Soccer 5 (Winning Eleven 9)		1,125,464+	Unknown	800,000+	1,925,464+
9	Animal Crossing: Wild World	DS	1,382,228	Unknown	—N/a	1,800,000+
10	Star Wars: Episode III – Revenge of the Sith		61,221	931,000+	611,000+	1,603,221+

Japan

Best-selling video games in Japan in 2005
Rank	Title	Platform(s)	Publisher	Genre	Sales	Ref
1	Oideyo Dōbutsu no Mori (Animal Crossing: Wild World)	DS	Nintendo	Social simulation	1,382,228	
2	Nō o Kitaeru Otona no DS Training (Brain Training)	DS	Nintendo	Edutainment	1,157,870	
3	World Soccer Winning Eleven 9 (Pro Evolution Soccer 5)	PS2	Konami	Sports simulation	1,125,464	
4	Gran Turismo 4	PS2	Sony	Racing simulation	1,066,749	
5	Pokémon Fushigi no Dungeon (Pokémon Mystery Dungeon)	DS, GBA	Nintendo	Roguelike	1,038,864	
6	Nintendogs	DS	Nintendo	Pet simulation	965,665	
7	Yawaraka Atama Juku (Big Brain Academy)	DS	Nintendo	Edutainment	935,535	
8	Shin Sangokumusou 4 (Dynasty Warriors 5)	PS2	Koei	Hack & slash	917,985	
9	Kingdom Hearts II	PS2	Square Enix	Action RPG	884,428	
10	Mario Kart DS	DS	Nintendo	Kart racing	836,478	

United States

Best-selling video games in the United States in 2005
Rank	Title	Platform(s)	Publisher	Sales	Revenue	Inflation	Ref
1	Madden NFL 06	PS2, XB, GCN	EA Sports	4,430,000	$204,000,000	$336,000,000	
2	Pokémon Emerald	GBA	Nintendo	1,700,000+	$58,000,000+	$96,000,000+	
3	Nintendogs	DS	Nintendo	1,624,335+	Unknown	Unknown	
4	Star Wars: Battlefront II	PS2, XB	LucasArts	1,567,000+	$74,000,000+	$122,000,000+	
5	Gran Turismo 4	PS2	Sony	1,500,000+	$74,000,000+	$122,000,000+	
6	NCAA Football 06	PS2	EA Sports	1,130,000	$54,000,000	$89,000,000	
7	MVP Baseball 2005	PS2	EA Sports	970,000	$28,000,000	$46,000,000	
8	World of Warcraft	WIN	Blizzard	957,000	$45,000,000	$74,000,000	
9	Star Wars: Episode III – Revenge of the Sith	PS2, XB, GBA	LucasArts	931,000+	$81,000,000	$134,000,000	
10	NBA Live 06	PS2	EA Sports	826,000	$36,000,000	$59,000,000	

PAL regions

Best-selling video games in PAL regions in 2005
Rank	Australia		United Kingdom			France
Rank	Title	Platform	Title	Platform(s)	Sales	France
1	Gran Turismo 4	PS2	FIFA 06		1,000,000+	Pro Evolution Soccer 5
2	Pokémon Emerald	GBA	Pro Evolution Soccer 5 (PES 5)		800,000+	Unknown
3	Grand Theft Auto: San Andreas	PS2	Need for Speed: Most Wanted		750,000+	Unknown
4	Need for Speed: Underground 2	PS2	Gran Turismo 4	PS2	611,000+	Unknown
5	The Simpsons: Hit & Run	PS2	Star Wars: Episode III – Revenge of the Sith		611,000	Unknown
6	Ratchet & Clank 3	PS2	FIFA Street		500,000+	Unknown
7	Buzz!: The Music Quiz	PS2	Star Wars: Battlefront II		500,000+	Unknown
8	Need for Speed: Most Wanted	PS2	Grand Theft Auto: San Andreas		450,000+	Unknown
9	WWE SmackDown! vs. Raw 2006	PS2	King Kong: The Official Game of the Movie		450,000+	Unknown
10	Super Mario 64 DS	DS	The Sims 2		402,000+	Unknown

== Top-rated games ==
=== Critically acclaimed games ===
Metacritic (MC) and GameRankings (GR) are aggregators of video game journalism reviews.

2005 games and expansions scoring at least 90/100 (MC) or 90% (GR)
Game	Publisher	Release Date	Platform	MC score	GR score
Resident Evil 4	Capcom	October 25, 2005	PS2	96/100	95.85%
Resident Evil 4	Capcom	January 11, 2005	GCN	96/100	95.83%
Ninja Gaiden Black	Tecmo	September 20, 2005	XB	94/100	94.76%
Tom Clancy's Splinter Cell: Chaos Theory	Ubisoft	March 28, 2005	XB	94/100	94.02%
God of War	Sony Computer Entertainment	March 22, 2005	PS2	94/100	93.58%
Civilization IV	2K Games	October 25, 2005	WIN	94/100	93.36%
Metal Gear Solid 3: Subsistence	Konami	December 22, 2005	PS2	94/100	92.97%
Forza Motorsport	Microsoft Game Studios	May 3, 2005	XB	92/100	93.05%
Grand Theft Auto: San Andreas	Rockstar Games	June 7, 2005	XB	93/100	92.29%
Grand Theft Auto: San Andreas	Rockstar Games	June 7, 2005	WIN	93/100	91.94%
Tom Clancy's Splinter Cell: Chaos Theory	Ubisoft	March 28, 2005	WIN	92/100	91.44%
Guitar Hero	RedOctane	November 7, 2005	PS2	91/100	91.96%
Shadow of the Colossus	Sony Computer Entertainment	October 18, 2005	PS2	91/100	91.43%
Mario Kart DS	Nintendo	November 14, 2005	DS	91/100	91.43%
Battlefield 2	Electronic Arts	June 21, 2005	WIN	91/100	90.07%
Castlevania: Dawn of Sorrow	Konami	August 25, 2005	DS	89/100	90.35%
Burnout Revenge	Electronic Arts	September 13, 2005	PS2	90/100	90.3%
Advance Wars: Dual Strike	Nintendo	June 23, 2005	DS	90/100	90.28%
Pro Evolution Soccer 5	Konami	August 4, 2005	WIN	89/100	90.25%
Psychonauts	Majesco	April 19, 2005	XB	88/100	90.21%
Silent Hunter III	Ubisoft	March 15, 2005	WIN	90/100	88.65%
Falcon 4.0: Allied Force	Graphsim Entertainment	June 28, 2005	WIN	90/100	88.56%

=== Major awards ===
Category/Organization		23rd Golden Joystick Awards November 4, 2005	VGA December 10, 2005	9th Annual Interactive Achievement Awards February 9, 2006	6th Game Developers Choice Awards March 23, 2006
Game of the Year		Grand Theft Auto: San Andreas	Resident Evil 4	God of War	Shadow of the Colossus
Wireless/Handheld	Wireless	Super Mario 64 DS	Marc Eckō's Getting Up: Contents Under Pressure	Ancient Empires II	—N/a
Wireless/Handheld	Handheld	Super Mario 64 DS	Lumines: Puzzle Fusion	Nintendogs	—N/a
Innovation		PlayStation Portable	—N/a	Guitar Hero	Guitar Hero, Nintendogs
Artistic Achievement or Graphics (Note: Certain award presentations combine these categories.)	Animation	—N/a	Resident Evil 4	God of War	Shadow of the Colossus
Artistic Achievement or Graphics	Art Direction	—N/a	Resident Evil 4	Shadow of the Colossus	Shadow of the Colossus
Audio	Music	—N/a	We Love Katamari	God of War	Guitar Hero
Audio	Sound Design	—N/a	—N/a	God of War	Guitar Hero
Audio	Soundtrack	Grand Theft Auto: San Andreas	Guitar Hero		Guitar Hero
Character Design or Performance	Male	—N/a	Jack Black as Carl Denham; Peter Jackson's King Kong: The Official Game of the Movie	T.C. Carson as Kratos; God of War	Shadow of the Colossus
Character Design or Performance	Female	—N/a	Charlize Theron as Æon Flux; Æon Flux	Kim Mai Guest as Dawn Star; Jade Empire	Shadow of the Colossus
Game Design		—N/a	—N/a	Guitar Hero	Shadow of the Colossus
Narrative		—N/a	—N/a	Call of Duty 2: Big Red One	Psychonauts
Technical Achievement	Gameplay Engineering	—N/a	PlayStation Portable	Guitar Hero, Nintendogs	Nintendogs
Technical Achievement	Visual Engineering	—N/a	PlayStation Portable	Shadow of the Colossus	Nintendogs
Multiplayer/Online		World of Warcraft	Guild Wars	Battlefield 2	—N/a
Action/Adventure	First-Person	—N/a	F.E.A.R.	Battlefield 2	—N/a
Action/Adventure	Adventure	—N/a	God of War		—N/a
Family or Children	Family	—N/a	—N/a	Guitar Hero	—N/a
Family or Children	Children	—N/a	—N/a	We Love Katamari	—N/a
Fighting		—N/a	Fight Night Round 2	Soulcalibur III	—N/a
Role-Playing	RPG	—N/a	World of Warcraft	Jade Empire	—N/a
Role-Playing	MMORPG	—N/a	World of Warcraft	City of Villains, Guild Wars	—N/a
Sports	Individual	—N/a	Tony Hawk's American Wasteland	SSX on Tour	—N/a
Sports	Team	—N/a	Madden NFL 06	SSX on Tour	—N/a
Racing		—N/a	Burnout Revenge	Need for Speed: Most Wanted	—N/a
Strategy/Simulation	Strategy	—N/a	—N/a	Civilization IV	—N/a
Strategy/Simulation	Simulation	—N/a	—N/a	The Movies	—N/a
Special Award		—N/a	—N/a	Hall of Fame	Lifetime Achievement Award
Special Award		—N/a	—N/a	Richard Garriott	

=== Top game rentals in the United States ===
Top video game rentals in the United States
Rank	Title	Platform	Publisher	Genre
1	Grand Theft Auto: San Andreas	PS2	Rockstar Games	Action-adventure
2	Need for Speed: Underground 2	PS2	Electronic Arts	Racing
3	Midnight Club 3: Dub Edition	PS2	Rockstar Games	Racing
4	Halo 2	XB	Microsoft	First-person shooter
5	Star Wars: Episode III – Revenge of the Sith	PS2	LucasArts	Action
6	Madden NFL 06	PS2	EA Sports	Sports
7	WWE SmackDown! vs. Raw	PS2	THQ	Wrestling
8	Gran Turismo 4	PS2	Sony	Racing simulation
9	Midnight Club 3: Dub Edition	XB	Rockstar Games	Racing
10	NCAA Football 06	PS2	EA Sports	Sports

== Major events ==
Date(s)	Event	Ref.
January 6	French publisher Titus Software, is declared bankrupt after being in receivership since October 2004. All assets are sold to Interplay Entertainment	
January 12	Video game companies and players worldwide donate money to the UNICEF South Asian Tsunami Relief Fund for rescue and reconstruction efforts upon the South Asian tsunami disaster. Electronic Arts pledges to donate $250,000 to the UNICEF South Asian Tsunami Relief Fund. CCP, the publisher of EVE Online, establishes a fund that video game players can contribute to.	
January 17	Electronic Arts and ESPN announced a 15-year partnership that would give EA access to ESPN's broadcast, print and online content.	
January 20	Activision announced that it acquired developer Vicarious Visions known best as a developer of Game Boy games as well as for their middleware program, Alchemy.	
January 24	Major League Baseball and Take-Two Interactive sign exclusive seven-year deal that gives Take-Two Interactive the rights among third-party publishers to develop games based on the MLB license.	
January 25	Take-Two Interactive announced that it acquired developer Visual Concepts and their wholly owned subsidiary Kush Games from Sega for $24 million. Additionally, Take-Two Interactive also announced the start of another publishing label named 2K Games.	
February	Troika Games defunct after being unable to get contracts for development work.	
February 14	Video sharing platform YouTube is launched. It would quickly become a favorite for gaming walkthroughs, Let's Plays, speedruns, and more.	
March 2	The Entertainment Software Rating Board or ESRB added the rating of "E10+" to its ratings system. E10+ was created in order to divide E ratings for younger and older children.	
March 6	The television show 60 Minutes tackles issues within video game controversy. This segment of 60 Minutes has been criticized by video game players for encouraging video game censorship.	
March 7	Sammy Studios breaks away from Sega Sammy Holdings and renames itself High Moon Studios.	
March 7–11	Game Developers Conference: Nintendo keynote speech: "The Heart of the Gamer" by Satoru Iwata, president of Nintendo.; Microsoft keynote speech: "The Future of Games: Unlocking the Opportunity" by J Allard, corporate vice president and chief XNA architect.	
March 9	Sega acquires Creative Assembly.	
March 23	Vivendi Universal Games buys developer Radical Entertainment. Radical is best known for developing The Simpsons: Hit & Run.	
April 2	Keiji Inafune, the creator of Mega Man series, was promoted from corporate officer to senior corporate officer.	
May	Buena Vista Games announces that it had bought the rights to the Turok video game franchise and will be publishing new games. The rights were originally held by bankrupt Acclaim Entertainment.	
May	In defense of video games being beneficial for cognitive development, Steven Berlin Johnson published his book Everything Bad Is Good for You: How Today's Popular Culture Is Actually Making Us Smarter.	
May 11	The global version of MapleStory is launched.	
May 12	The Xbox 360 was officially announced on MTV in a special hosted by Elijah Wood.	
May 16	The PlayStation 3 was unveiled by Sony during a pre-E3 press conference, at 21:25 GMT. At the same time, the press release was released through the Japanese PlayStation website.	
May 18–20	The 11th annual E3 (Electronic Entertainment Expo) takes place in Los Angeles, California. Four hundred exhibiting companies and 70,000 industry professionals representing 79 countries attended. Next-generation systems from Nintendo, Sony, and Microsoft were unveiled.	
May 22	The Pac-Man franchise celebrated its 25th anniversary in Japan.	
June 1	IBM held the first virtual video game on-demand conference in which game developers and manufacturers were able to come together to discuss issues with online games, including management and distribution.	
July 18–22	IEMA (Interactive Entertainment Merchants Association) hosts 6th annual Executive Summit.	
July 20	After coming under heavy fire from many politicians, most notably Hillary Clinton, the Entertainment Software Rating Board re-rated Rockstar Games' Grand Theft Auto: San Andreas Adults Only 18+ (AO) due to the sexually explicit minigame mod "Hot Coffee". Additionally, Rockstar Games ceased production of the game and has announced plans to offer a new version of the game that can't be affected by the mod, and plans to patch the PC version.	
July 27	Sony Computer Entertainment released the first major update in Japan for their video game handheld, the PlayStation Portable. Version 2.00 includes a web browser, A-B repeat mode, Wi-Fi picture sending, as well as additional audio & video support among other features.	
August 8	Abandon Mobile announces its formation through a partnership between Abandon Entertainment, Inc. and GF Capital Management and Advisors, LLC.	
August 22	Square Enix acquires Taito leading to Square Enix entering the arcade sector of the electronic game industry.	
September 13	The Super Mario series celebrated its 20th anniversary in Japan.	
September 16–18	Tokyo Game Show takes place at Makuhari Messe. One hundred-thirty companies are expected to show with 1,429 booths.: Nintendo keynote speech by Satoru Iwata, president of Nintendo. During Iwata's keynote speech, the Wii controller is unveiled.; Microsoft keynote speech by Robert J. Bach, chief Xbox officer and senior vice president, Home and Entertainment Division at Microsoft.	
September 29	Namco merges with Bandai to form Bandai Namco Holdings, the third-largest video game entity in Japan.	
November	Pandemic Studios and BioWare partner to create BioWare/Pandemic Studios.	
November 7	Take-Two Interactive acquires Firaxis Games.	
November 14	Nintendo's first mainstream online service (Nintendo Wi-Fi Connection) is launched with Mario Kart DS and Tony Hawk's American Sk8land.	
November 16–20	The 2005 World Cyber Games are held.	
November 22	Microsoft releases the Xbox 360 as a successor to the original Xbox.	
November 30	Sony Computer Entertainment announce that PlayStation 2 breaks a record: the fastest console to reach cumulative shipment of 100 million units, beating the previous record holder, the PlayStation, by three years and nine months. The PS platform has until the present year the biggest sales of all times of video games history, with 120 million consoles shipped.	
December 10	The 2005 Spike Video Game Awards are held.	
December 12	Working Designs closes down.	
December 16	The Family Entertainment Protection Act (FEPA) is introduced by Senators Hillary Clinton, Joe Lieberman and Evan Bayh. The bill calls for a federal mandate enforcement of the Entertainment Software Rating Board (ESRB) ratings system for video games in order to protect children from inappropriate content.	

== Notable deaths ==
- January 15 – Deem Bristow, 57, voice actor best known for voicing Doctor Eggman.
- July 21 – Long John Baldry, 64, musician who played Dr. Ivo Robotnik in Adventures of Sonic the Hedgehog, various voices in Captain N: The Game Master, and KOMPLEX in Bucky O'Hare.
- October 2 – Hamilton Camp, 70, actor best known for voice the Prophet of Mercy in Halo 2.
- November 13 – Eddie Guerrero, 38 pro wrestler who appeared in the WWE games (cover star of WWE Survivor Series and WWE Aftershock).

== Hardware releases ==
This year saw the worldwide release of Sony's PlayStation Portable after initially launching in Japan the previous year. The Nintendo DS made its launch in Australasia on February 24 and then in Europe on March 11. Nintendo also released the Game Boy Micro, the final revision model of the Game Boy Advance as well as the final entry in the Game Boy family overall. The Game Boy Micro was negatively received due to it not being backwards compatible with Game Boy and Game Boy Color games (unlike the first 2 GBA models), leading to it being one of Nintendo's worst-selling consoles of all time.

Additionally, Microsoft's Xbox 360, Sony's PlayStation 3 and Nintendo's Wii were officially unveiled during or just prior to E3; however, only the Xbox 360 was released in 2005. The Xbox 360 was released in North America on November 22, Europe on December 2, and Japan on December 10.

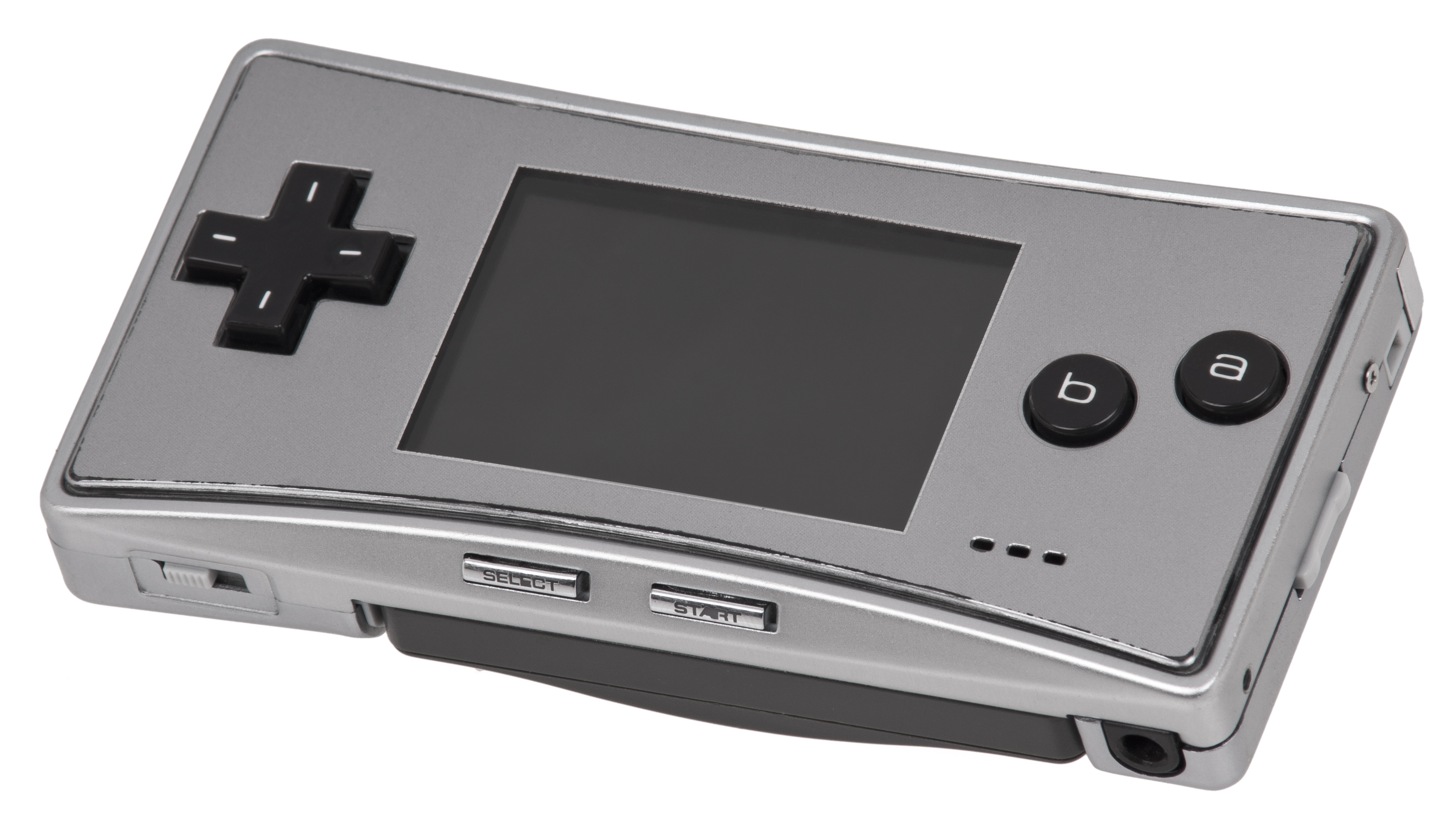
The Game Boy Micro, the final entry in the Game Boy family.

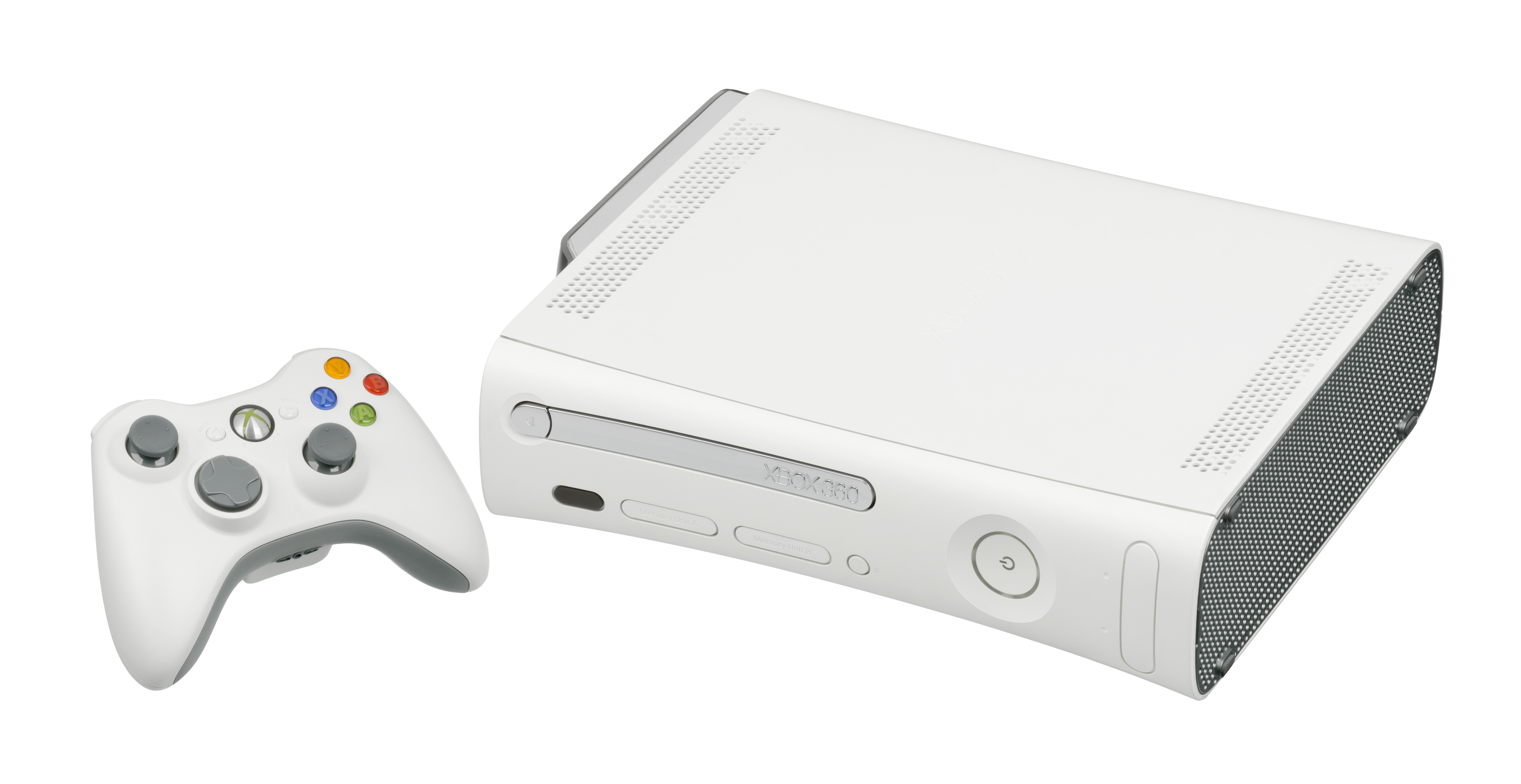
Xbox 360

Date	Console	Ref.
February 24	Nintendo DS^{AU}	
March 11	Nintendo DS^{EU}	
March 24	PlayStation Portable^{NA/BR/IDN}	
April 12	PlayStation Portable^{ITA/UKR/IND}	
September 1	PlayStation Portable^{EU/AU/AF/AS}	
September 13	Game Boy Micro^{JP}	
September 19	Game Boy Micro^{NA}	
October 1	Game Boy Micro^{CHN}	
November 3	Game Boy Micro^{AU}	
November 4	Game Boy Micro^{EU}	
November 22	Xbox 360^{NA}	
December 2	Xbox 360^{EU}	
December 10	Xbox 360^{JP}	

== Games released in 2005 ==
Release date	Title	Platform	Genre	Ref.
January 10	The Legend of Zelda: The Minish Cap	GBA		
January 10	Software Tycoon	LIN		
January 11	Resident Evil 4	GCN		
January 11	Mercenaries: Playground of Destruction	PS2, XB		
January 11	The Getaway: Black Monday	PS2		
January 12	Banjo-Pilot	GBA		
January 16	The Punisher	WIN, PS2, XB		
January 18	Fullmetal Alchemist and the Broken Angel	PS2		
January 18	Street Racing Syndicate	WIN		
January 18	Virtua Quest	PS2		
January 18	Zoo Keeper	DS		
January 19	Virtua Quest	GCN		
January 25	Oddworld: Stranger's Wrath	XB		
January 25	Playboy: The Mansion	WIN, PS2, XB		
January 27	COPS 2170: The Power of Law	WIN		
February 4	Postal²: Share the Pain	LIN		
February 8	Racing Gears Advance	GBA		
February 8	Star Wars: Knights of the Old Republic II The Sith Lords	WIN		
February 8	Shadow of Rome	PS2		
February 8	Shaman King: Legacy of the Spirits, Soaring Hawk	GBA		
February 8	Shaman King: Legacy of the Spirits, Sprinting Wolf	GBA		
February 8	Winnie the Pooh's Rumbly Tumbly Adventure	GCN, PS2, GBA		
February 14	Star Fox Assault	GCN		
February 14	WarioWare: Touched!	DS		
February 15	Constantine	WIN, PS2, XB		
February 15	Nano Breaker	PS2		
February 15	Xenosaga Episode II: Jenseits von Gut und Böse	PS2		
February 17	Devil May Cry 3: Dante's Awakening	PS2		
February 22	FIFA Street	PS2, XB, GCN		
February 22	Gran Turismo 4	PS2		
February 22	MVP Baseball 2005	WIN, GCN, PS2, XB		
February 22	Street Fighter III: 3rd Strike	XB		
February 22	Ace Combat Advance	GBA		
February 23	Klonoa 2: Dream Champ Tournament	GBA		
February 23	Project Snowblind	PS2, XB		
February 23	Super Army War	GBA		
February 24	Judge Dredd: Dredd vs. Death	PS2		
February 24	Tekken 5	PS2		
February 27	Judge Dredd: Dredd vs. Death	XB		
February 28	American McGee Presents: Scrapland	XB		
February 28	Fight Night Round 2	PS2, XB, GCN		
February 28	Ice Nine	GBA		
February 28	Star Wars: Republic Commando	XB		
March 1	Brothers in Arms: Road to Hill 30	XB		
March 1	Devil May Cry 3: Dante's Awakening	PS2		
March 1	Judge Dredd: Dredd vs. Death	GCN		
March 1	Star Wars: Republic Commando	WIN		
March 1	Mortal Kombat: Deception	GCN		
March 3	Judge Dredd: Dredd vs. Death	WIN		
March 8	MLB 2006	PS2, PSP		
March 8	Rave Master	GCN		
March 13	Pokémon Dash	DS		
March 14	Donkey Kong Jungle Beat	GCN		
March 14	Need for Speed Underground: Rivals	PSP		
March 14	World Tour Soccer: Challenge Edition	PSP		
March 14	Yoshi Touch & Go	DS		
March 15	Act of War: Direct Action	WIN		
March 15	Brothers in Arms: Road to Hill 30	WIN, PS2		
March 15	Cold Fear	PS2, XB		
March 15	Driver 3	WIN		
March 15	Musashi: Samurai Legend	PS2		
March 15	Phantom Dust	XB		
March 15	Rayman: Hoodlums' Revenge	GBA		
March 15	Spider-Man 2	PSP		
March 15	Super Monkey Ball Deluxe	PS2, XB		
March 15	Tony Hawk's Underground 2: Remix	PSP		
March 16	Dynasty Warriors	PSP		
March 16	MX vs. ATV Unleashed	PS2		
March 16	Retro Atari Classics	DS		
March 21	NFL Street 2 Unleashed	PSP		
March 21	TimeSplitters: Future Perfect	GCN, PS2, XB		
March 22	Dragon Ball Z: Sagas	PS2, XB, GCN		
March 22	God of War	PS2		
March 22	Lumines	PSP		
March 22	The Matrix Online	WIN		
March 22	Metal Gear Acid	PSP		
March 22	Shining Tears	PS2		
March 24	Bionicle: Maze of Shadows	GBA		
March 24	Darkstalkers Chronicle: The Chaos Tower	PSP		
March 24	MX vs. ATV Unleashed	XB		
March 24	Rayman DS	DS		
March 24	Ridge Racer	PSP		
March 24	Twisted Metal: Head-On	PSP		
March 24	Wipeout Pure	PSP		
March 25	Iron Phoenix	XB		
March 25	Sudeki	WIN		
March 28	Mario Party Advance	GBA		
March 29	Dynasty Warriors 5	PS2		
March 29	Red Ninja: End of Honor	XB		
March 29	Spikeout: Battle Street	XB		
March 30	Red Ninja: End of Honor	PS2		
March 31	Tom Clancy's Splinter Cell: Chaos Theory	WIN, PS2, XB, GCN		
April 3	Doom 3	XB		
April 3	Doom 3: Resurrection of Evil	WIN		
April 5	Rise of the Kasai	PS2		
April 5	Lego Star Wars: The Video Game	WIN, PS2, XB, GBA		
April 5	Shin Megami Tensei: Digital Devil Saga	PS2		
April 5	SWAT 4	WIN		
April 6	Archer Maclean's Mercury	PSP		
April 6	Close Combat: First to Fight	XB		
April 11	Midnight Club 3: DUB Edition	PS2, XB		
April 12	Jade Empire	XB		
April 18	Polarium	DS		
April 18	Unreal Championship 2: The Liandri Conflict	XB		
April 19	ATV Offroad Fury: Blazin' Trails	PSP		
April 19	Psychonauts	XB		
April 20	WWE WrestleMania 21	XB		
April 21	Haunting Ground	PS2		
April 21	Raze's Hell	XB		
April 24	Popeye: Rush for Spinach	GBA		
April 26	Guild Wars	WIN		
April 26	Pac-Pix	DS		
April 26	Psychonauts	WIN		
April 26	ObsCure	WIN, PS2, XB		
April 26	Rengoku: The Tower of Purgatory	PSP		
April 27	Motocross Mania 3	PS2, XB		
April 27	NBA Street Showdown	PSP		
April 27	Predator: Concrete Jungle	PS2, XB		
May 1	Pokémon Emerald (North America)	GBA		
May 2	Pac-Man Pinball Advance	GBA		
May 3	Forza Motorsport	XB		
May 3	Hot Shots Golf: Open Tee	PSP		
May 3	Pariah	WIN, XB		
May 3	Puyo Pop Fever	DS		
May 5	Star Wars Episode III: Revenge of the Sith	PS2, XB, GBA, DS, MOBI		
May 9	Donkey Konga 2: Hit Song Parade!	GCN		
May 11	Cold Winter	PS2		
May 18	Fate	WIN, OSX		
May 19	Chameleon	WIN		
May 23	WarioWare: Twisted!	GBA		
May 23	Fire Emblem: The Sacred Stones	GBA		
May 24	Madagascar	WIN, GCN, PS2, XB, GBA, DS		
May 27	7 Sins	WIN, PS2		
May 31	Advent Rising	XB		
June 2	Digimon World 4	GCN, PS2, XB		
June 7	Grand Theft Auto: San Andreas	WIN, XB		
June 7	Medal of Honor: European Assault	GCN, PS2, XB		
June 8	Area 51	WIN, PS2, XB		
June 13	Juiced	WIN, PS2, XB		
June 13	Yoshi Topsy-Turvy	GBA		
June 13	Kirby: Canvas Curse	DS		
June 14	Arc the Lad: End of Darkness	PS2		
June 14	Batman Begins	GCN, PS2, XB, GBA		
June 14	Capcom Fighting Evolution	XB		
June 21	Battlefield 2	WIN		
June 21	Bomberman	DS		
June 21	Conker: Live & Reloaded	XB		
June 21	Destroy All Humans!	PS2, XB		
June 21	Mega Man Battle Network 5	GBA		
June 22	Psychonauts	PS2		
June 24	Soul Ride	LIN		
June 27	Fantastic Four	WIN, GCN, PS2, XB, GBA		
June 27	Meteos	DS		
June 27	Midnight Club 3: DUB Edition	PSP		
June 28	Dead to Rights: Reckoning	PSP		
June 28	Falcon 4.0: Allied Force	WIN		
June 28	Riviera: The Promised Land	GBA		
July 5	Façade	WIN, OSX		
July 6	Coded Arms	PSP		
July 7	killer7	PS2, GCN		
July 11	Charlie and the Chocolate Factory	PS2, XB, GCN, GBA		
July 12	FlatOut (North America)	WIN, XB		
July 12	Nancy Drew: Secret of the Old Clock	WIN		
July 19	Nanostray	DS		
July 20	Colosseum: Road to Freedom	PS2		
July 26	Harvest Moon: More Friends of Mineral Town	GBA		
July 26	Disney's Kim Possible 3: Team Possible	GBA, DS		
July 26	Makai Kingdom: Chronicles of the Sacred Tome	PS2		
July 29	Worms 4	WIN, PS2, XB		
August 2	BloodRayne 2 (NA)	WIN		
August 2	Shaman King: Master of Spirits 2	GBA		
August 3	Tom Clancy's Ghost Recon 2: Summit Strike	XB		
August 8	Madden NFL 06	PS2, GCN, DS		
August 9	Advent Rising	WIN		
August 9	Dragon Ball GT: Transformation	GBA		
August 15	Geist	GCN		
August 16	Death Jr.	PSP		
August 16	Dungeon Siege II	WIN		
August 16	EyeToy: Play 2	PS2		
August 16	Hello Kitty: Roller Rescue	GCN		
August 16	Pac 'n Roll	DS		
August 16	Sigma Star Saga	GBA		
August 17	Madden NFL 06	WIN		
August 22	Nintendogs	DS		
August 22	Advance Wars: Dual Strike	DS		
August 23	187 Ride or Die	PS2, XB		
August 23	Beat Down: Fists of Vengeance	PS2, XB		
August 23	The Incredible Hulk: Ultimate Destruction	PS2, GCN, XB		
August 25	InuYasha: Feudal Combat	PS2		
August 29	Dynasty Warriors Advance	GBA		
August 29	Mario Superstar Baseball	GCN		
August 29	WWE Day of Reckoning 2	GCN		
August 30	MotoGP 3: Ultimate Racing Technology	WIN, XB		
August 31	World Series of Poker	PS2, XB		
September	Warhammer 40,000: Dawn of War: Winter Assault	WIN		
September 6	Radiata Stories	PS2		
September 6	Rebelstar: Tactical Command	GBA		
September 7	One Piece: Grand Battle! Rush	GCN, PS2		
September 8	Danny Phantom: The Ultimate Enemy	GBA		
September 13	Armored Core: Nine Breaker	PS2		
September 13	Burnout Legends	PSP		
September 13	Burnout Revenge	PS2, XB		
September 13	Dynasty Warriors 5	XB		
September 13	EverQuest II: Desert of Flames	WIN		
September 13	Evil Dead: Regeneration	WIN, PS2, XB		
September 13	GripShift	PSP		
September 13	MediEvil: Resurrection	PSP		
September 13	Scooby-Doo! Unmasked	PS2, GCN, XB, GBA, DS		
September 13	World Series of Poker	WIN		
September 14	Tecmo Classic Arcade	XB		
September 14	World Series of Poker	GCN		
September 15	Fire Pro Wrestling Returns	PS2		
September 15	Nancy Drew: Last Train to Blue Moon Canyon	WIN		
September 15	World Series of Poker	PSP		
September 16	Mortal Kombat: Shaolin Monks (US)	PS2, XB		
September 19	DK King of Swing	GBA		
September 19	Frantix	PSP		
September 19	Tak: The Great Juju Challenge	PS2, XB, GCN, GBA, DS, PSP		
September 20	Genji: Dawn of the Samurai	PS2		
September 20	Gretzky NHL 2006	PS2		
September 20	Fahrenheit: Indigo Prophecy	WIN, PS2, XB		
September 20	Kingdom Under Fire:Heroes	XB		
September 20	Legend of Kay	PS2		
September 20	Myst V: End of Ages	WIN		
September 20	Ninja Gaiden Black	XB		
September 20	Space Invaders Revolution	DS		
September 20	We Love Katamari	PS2		
September 20	Whac-A-Mole	GBA		
September 20	Marvel Nemesis: Rise of the Imperfects	GCN, PS2, XB, DS, PSP		
September 20	X-Men Legends II: Rise of Apocalypse	WIN, GCN, PS2, XB		
September 21	Mega Man X8 (EU)	WIN		
September 22	Ultimate Spider-Man	WIN, GCN, PS2, XB, GBA, DS		
September 23	Neuro Hunter (UK)	WIN		
September 26	Another Code: Two Memories	DS		
September 26	Sly 3: Honor Among Thieves	PS2		
September 26	Tiger Woods PGA Tour 06	PSP		
September 26	Top Spin	PS2		
September 27	Capcom Classics Collection	PS2, XB		
September 27	Far Cry Instincts	XB		
September 27	Frogger: Ancient Shadow	PS2, XB, GCN		
September 27	Lost in Blue	DS		
September 27	Lunar: Dragon Song	DS		
September 27	Tom Clancy's Rainbow Six: Lockdown	GCN		
September 28	Dance Dance Revolution Extreme 2	PS2		
September 29	Battalion Wars	GCN		
September 29	Frogger: Helmet Chaos	DS, PSP		
September 30	Mortal Kombat: Shaolin Monks (EU)	PS2, XB		
October 3	Pokémon XD: Gale of Darkness	GCN		
October 4	Castlevania: Dawn of Sorrow	DS		
October 4	Bratz: Rock Angelz	WIN, PS2, GCN, GBA		
October 4	FIFA 06	WIN, PS2, XB, GCN, DS, MOBI		
October 4	Mega Man Zero 4	GBA		
October 4	Street Racing Syndicate	GBA		
October 4	Trauma Center: Under the Knife	DS		
October 5	Doom 3: Resurrection of Evil	XB		
October 7	Black & White 2	WIN		
October 7	Virtua Tennis: World Tour	PSP		
October 7	Wallace & Gromit: The Curse of the Were-Rabbit	PS2, XB		
October 10	The Nightmare Before Christmas: Oogie's Revenge	PS2, XB		
October 10	The Nightmare Before Christmas: The Pumpkin King	GBA, DS		
October 10	L.A. Rush	PS2, XB		
October 11	FIFA 06	PSP, GBA		
October 11	Codename: Kids Next Door – Operation: V.I.D.E.O.G.A.M.E.	GCN, PS2, XB		
October 11	SOCOM 3	PS2		
October 11	Hello Kitty: Happy Party Pals	GBA		
October 11	Zoo Tycoon DS	DS		
October 11	Serious Sam II	WIN, XB		
October 11	SSX on Tour	GCN, PS2, XB, PSP		
October 12	Devil Kings	PS2		
October 12	Phoenix Wright: Ace Attorney	DS		
October 13	FlatOut (JP)	PS2		
October 16	Teen Titans	GBA		
October 17	Grand Theft Auto: The Trilogy	XB		
October 17	F.E.A.R.	WIN		
October 17	The Warriors	PS2, XB		
October 18	Chicken Little	GCN, PS2, XB		
October 18	Quake 4	WIN		
October 18	Age of Empires III	WIN		
October 18	Dig Dug: Digging Strike	DS		
October 18	Jak X: Combat Racing	PS2		
October 18	Shadow of the Colossus	PS2		
October 18	Spyro: Shadow Legacy	DS		
October 18	Stubbs the Zombie in Rebel Without a Pulse	XB		
October 18	The Con	PSP		
October 18	The Fairly Oddparents! Clash with the Anti-World	GBA		
October 18	Zoo Tycoon 2: Endangered Species	WIN		
October 19	Fire Emblem: Path of Radiance	GCN		
October 19	Crash Tag Team Racing	GCN, PS2, XB		
October 19	X-Men Legends II: Rise of Apocalypse	PSP		
October 19	Zatch Bell! Mamodo Battles	GCN, PS2		
October 20	Navy Field Online	WIN		
October 21	SpongeBob SquarePants: Lights, Cameras, Pants!	PS2, XB		
October 24	Call of Cthulhu: Dark Corners of the Earth	XB		
October 24	Dance Dance Revolution Mario Mix	GCN		
October 24	Grand Theft Auto: Liberty City Stories	PSP		
October 24	Metroid Prime Pinball	DS		
October 24	Nintendogs: Best Friends	DS		
October 25	Atomic Betty	GBA		
October 25	Battlefield 2: Modern Combat	PS2, XB		
October 25	Call of Duty 2	WIN		
October 25	Civilization IV	WIN		
October 25	Driver 3	GBA		
October 25	Gunstar Super Heroes	GBA		
October 25	Kong: King of Atlantis	GBA		
October 25	LEGO Star Wars: The Video Game	GCN		
October 25	Resident Evil 4	PS2		
October 25	Ratchet: Deadlocked	PS2		
October 25	Shrek SuperSlam	WIN, GCN, PS2, XB, GBA, DS		
October 25	Soul Calibur III	PS2		
October 26	Brothers in Arms: Earned in Blood	WIN, PS2, XB		
October 26	Ghost In The Shell:Stand Alone Complex	PSP		
October 26	Nicktoons Unite!	GBA		
October 27	Half-Life 2: Lost Coast	WIN		
November 1	007: From Russia with Love	PS2, XB, GCN		
November 1	Call of Duty 2: Big Red One	PS2, XB, GCN		
November 1	Castlevania: Curse of Darkness	PS2, XB		
November 1	Mega Man Battle Network 5: Double Team DS	DS		
November 1	Shamu's Deep Sea Adventures	PS2, XB		
November 1	Star Wars Battlefront 2	WIN, PS2, XB, PSP		
November 1	The Incredibles: Rise of the Underminer	WIN, PS2, XB, GCN, DS, GBA		
November 1	TY the Tasmanian Tiger 3: Night of the Quinkan	GBA		
November 3	Ed, Edd n Eddy: The Mis-Edventures	WIN, PS2, XB, GCN, GBA		
November 7	Donkey Kong Country 3: Dixie Kong's Double Trouble!	GBA		
November 7	Madagascar: Operation Penguin	GBA		
November 7	Mario Party 7	GCN		
November 7	The Matrix: Path of Neo	WIN, PS2, XB		
November 8	EyeToy: Kinetic	PS2		
November 8	Fatal Frame III: The Tormented	PS2		
November 8	Guitar Hero	PS2		
November 8	Gun	WIN, PS2, XB, GCN		
November 8	Harry Potter And The Goblet Of Fire	WIN, PS2, XB, GCN, DS, GBA		
November 8	Shamu's Deep Sea Adventures	GCN, GBA, DS		
November 8	SOCOM U.S. Navy SEALs: Fireteam Bravo	PSP		
November 8	Suikoden Tactics	PS2		
November 8	The Lord of the Rings: Tactics	PSP		
November 8	The Movies	WIN		
November 8	Viewtiful Joe: Double Trouble!	DS		
November 8	Viewtiful Joe: Red Hot Rumble	GCN		
November 9	Big Mutha Truckers	GBA		
November 10	Crash Tag Team Racing	PSP		
November 13	Animaniacs: Lights, Camera, Action!	GBA		
November 13	The Proud Family	GBA, DS		
November 14	Animaniacs: Lights, Camera, Action!	DS		
November 14	ATV: Quad Frenzy	DS		
November 14	The Chronicles Of Narnia: The Lion, The Witch and The Wardrobe	WIN, PS2, XB, GCN, DS, GBA		
November 14	Garfield: The Search for Pooky	GBA		
November 14	Mario Kart DS	DS		
November 15	Dragon Quest VIII (NA)	PS2		
November 15	Shadow the Hedgehog	PS2, XB, GCN		
November 15	Half-Life 2	XB		
November 15	Dance Dance Revolution Ultramix 3	XB		
November 15	EyeToy: Operation Spy	PS2		
November 15	Harry Potter And The Goblet Of Fire	PSP		
November 15	Infected	PSP		
November 15	Kingdom of Paradise	PSP		
November 15	Magna Carta: Crimson Stigmata	PS2		
November 15	Need for Speed: Most Wanted	WIN, PS2, XB, GCN, GBA, DS, PSP		
November 15	Neopets: The Darkest Faerie	PS2		
November 15	Pac-Man World 3	WIN, PS2, XB, GCN, DS		
November 15	Sonic Rush	DS		
November 15	Totally Spies!	GBA		
November 15	True Crime: New York City	WIN, PS2, XB, GCN		
November 15	Wild Arms Alter Code: F	PS2		
November 15	WWE SmackDown! vs. Raw 2006	PS2		
November 16	Cabela's Dangerous Hunts 2	PS2, XB, GCN		
November 16	Devilish: Ball Bounder	DS		
November 17	50 Cent: Bulletproof	PS2, XB		
November 17	Peter Jackson's King Kong: The Official Game of the Movie	WIN, PS2, XB, GCN		
November 20	Dragon Ball Z: Supersonic Warriors 2	DS		
November 21	Battlefield 2: Special Forces	WIN		
November 21	College Hoops 2K6	XB		
November 21	Kong: The 8th Wonder of the World	GBA		
November 22	Amped 3	XB360		
November 22	Call of Duty 2	XB360		
November 22	Condemned: Criminal Origins	XB360		
November 22	FIFA 06: Road To FIFA World Cup	XB360		
November 22	Geometry Wars: Retro Evolved	XB360		
November 22	Kameo	XB360		
November 22	Mutant Storm Reloaded	XB360		
November 22	Need for Speed: Most Wanted	XB360		
November 22	Outpost Kaloki X	XB360		
November 22	Perfect Dark Zero	XB360		
November 22	Peter Jackson's King Kong: The Official Game of the Movie	XB360		
November 22	Quake 4	XB360		
November 22	Ridge Racer 6	XB360		
November 22	SBK: Snowboard Kids	DS		
November 28	Mario and Luigi: Partners in Time	DS		
November 29	Burnout Legends	DS		
November 30	College Hoops 2K6	PS2		
November 30	Prince of Persia: The Two Thrones	WIN, PS2, XB, GCN		
December 2	Chicken Little	WIN		
December 5	Animal Crossing: Wild World	DS		
December 5	Mario Tennis: Power Tour	GBA		
December 5	Super Mario Strikers	GCN		
December 5	Tokobot	PSP		
December 6	Battles of Prince of Persia	DS		
December 6	Bust-a-Move DS	DS		
December 6	Pac-Man World 3	PSP		
December 6	Prince of Persia: Revelations	PSP		
December 7	Dragon Booster	DS		
December 7	The Sims 2	PSP		
December 8	Yakuza (JP)	PS2		
December 9	The Endless Forest	WIN		
December 12	Final Fantasy IV Advance	GBA		
December 12	Gauntlet: Seven Sorrows	PS2, XB		
December 13	Midway Arcade Treasures: Extended Play	PSP		
December 13	Ultimate Block Party	PSP		
December 15	Armored Core: Formula Front	PSP		
December 20	Chaos Field	GCN		
December 20	Peter Jackson's King Kong: The Official Game of the Movie	PSP		
December 22	Kingdom Hearts II (JP)	PS2		
December 29	Dead or Alive 4	XB360		

== Video game-based film and television releases ==
Title	Date	Director	Distributor(s)	Franchise	Original game publishe	Ref.
Xenosaga: The Animation	January 5, 2005	Shigeyasu Yamauchi	Toei Animation	Xenosaga	Monolith Soft	
Lucario and the Mystery of Mew	July 16, 2005	Kunihiko Yuyama	Toho	Pokémon	Game Freak	
Final Fantasy VII: Advent Children	September 14, 2005	Tetsuya Nomura	Square Enix Image Studio Division	Final Fantasy	Square Enix	
Last Order: Final Fantasy VII	September 14, 2005	Morio Asaka	Madhouse, Inc.	Final Fantasy	Square Enix	
Pokémon: Battle Frontier	October 6, 2005	Masamitsu Hidaka	TV Tokyo	Pokémon	Game Freak	
Doom	October 17, 2005	Andrzej Bartkowiak	Universal Pictures	Doom	Id Software	
Street Fighter Alpha: Generations	October 25, 2005	Ikuo Kuwana	Manga Entertainment	Street Fighter	Capcom	
The King of Fighters: Another Day	December 2, 2005	Masaki Tachibana	Production I.G	The King of Fighters	SNK	

== See also ==
- 2005 in games
