= Dan Green (voice actor) =

American voice actor

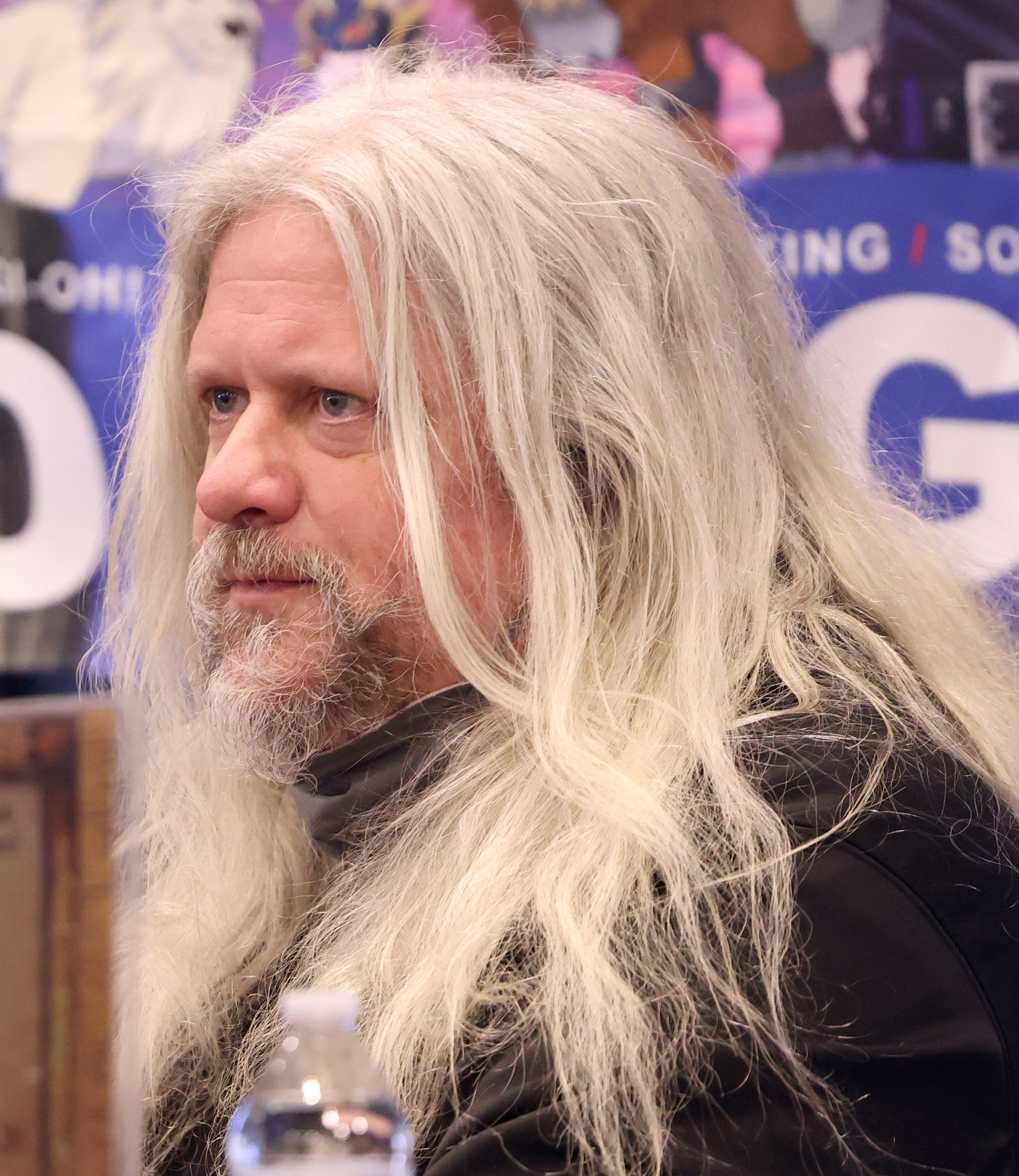
- Green in 2026
- Born: James Hadley Snyder
- Other names: Chris Adams; Tom Wilson; Stan Timmons; Jean Mills; Jack Bean; Sam Wells; Frank Brown; Jean Masters; J.K. Ellemeno; Sandy Williams; Chris Sands
- Education: Rutgers University
- Occupations: Voice actor; voice director; screenwriter
- Years active: 1998–present
- Spouse: Michal Friedman (m. 2008; died 2011)
- Children: 2

James Hadley Snyder, known professionally as Dan Green, is an American voice actor, voice director and screenwriter. He is best known for being the voice of Yugi Muto/Yami Yugi/Pharaoh Atem for the English dub of Yu-Gi-Oh! Duel Monsters, the anime series version of Yu-Gi-Oh!, as well as all of the character's U.S. series appearances.

== Early life ==
Green attended Rutgers University in New Brunswick, New Jersey.

== Career ==
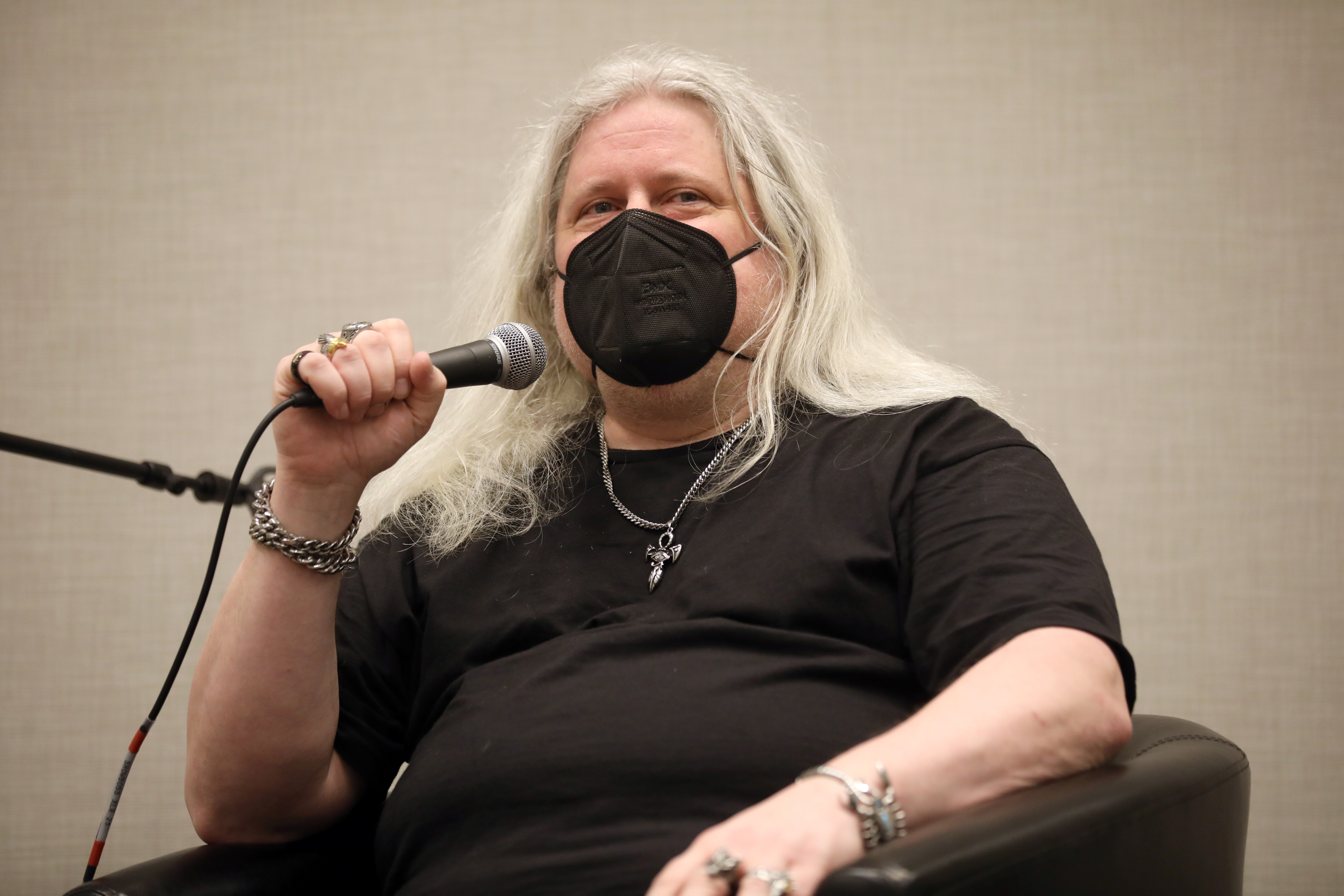
Green in 2024

Green is best known as the voice of Yugi Mutou/Yami Yugi in Yu-Gi-Oh! Duel Monsters, Trudge in Yu-Gi-Oh! 5D's, and Knuckles the Echidna in Sonic X and the Sonic the Hedgehog video games (2005–2010). He has worked for 4Kids Entertainment, DuArt Film and Video, NYAV Post, TAJ Productions and Central Park Media. He has also worked on script adaptations of Kurokami: The Animation and Mobile Suit Gundam Unicorn, and teaches voice acting at Edge Studio in New York City.

== Personal life ==
Green married singer and voice actress Michal Lura Friedman, better known as Michal the Girl, in 2008. While giving birth to twins (a son named Jackson and a daughter named Reverie) on November 25, 2011, Friedman died from complications following a C-section. Fans began charity efforts to provide financial support for the twins.

== Filmography ==
=== Anime film ===
Year	Title	Role	Notes
2001	Pokémon 3: The Movie	Entei/Spencer Hale	English dub
2002	Pokémon 4Ever	The Iron-Masked Marauder	English dub
2003	The Weathering Continent	Gaten Rakumu	English dub
2004	Yu-Gi-Oh! The Movie: Pyramid of Light	Yugi Muto/Yami Yugi	English dub
2005	Kakurenbo: Hide and Seek	Yaimao	English dub
2009	Pokemon: Arceus and the Jewel of Life	Damos	English dub
2009	Turtles Forever	1988 Leonardo	English dub
2010	Yu-Gi-Oh!: Bonds Beyond Time	Yugi Muto/Yami Yugi	English dub
2014	Welcome to the Space Show	Goba	English dub
2017	Yu-Gi-Oh!: The Dark Side of Dimensions	Yugi Muto/Yami Yugi	English dub
2018	Mazinger Z: Infinity	Tetsuya Tsurugi	English dub
2020	Mewtwo Strikes Back: Evolution	Mewtwo	English dub
2020	Mangu: The Donkey King	King Badshah Khan	English dub

=== Anime ===
- Akudama Drive – Headmaster (ep. 7)
- Descendants of Darkness – Asato Tsuzuki
- Dinosaur King – Jonathan
- Patlabor: The TV Series – Fujioka, Asuma Shinohara
- The King of Braves GaoGaiGar – Koutaro Taiga
- Kirby: Right Back at Ya! – N.M.E. Salesman, Whispy Woods
- The Legend of Snow White – Prince Richard (episodes 17–52)
- One Piece – Johnny, Mr. 4, Nezumi, Narrator (4Kids)
- Pokémon – Professor Birch, Treecko, Lombre, Spiritomb
- Pokémon: Mewtwo Returns – Mewtwo
- Pokémon Mystery Dungeon: Explorers of Time & Darkness – Grovyle
- Pokémon Mystery Dungeon: Explorers of Sky – Beyond Time & Darkness – Grovyle
- Revolutionary Girl Utena – Soji Mikage
- Shaman King (2001) – Silva, Lee Pai-Long, Zen, Ramiro, Savage Dan
- Shaman King (2021) – Lee Pyron, Silva, Patch Hao
- Sonic X – Knuckles the Echidna
- Yu-Gi-Oh! Duel Monsters – Yugi Muto/Yami Yugi
- Yu-Gi-Oh! Capsule Monsters – Yugi Muto/Yami Yugi
- Yu-Gi-Oh! GX – Yugi Muto/Yami Yugi
- Yu-Gi-Oh! 5Ds – Tetsu Trudge, Guard Robot
- Yu-Gi-Oh! ZEXAL – Tombo Tillbitty
- Code Geass: Rozé of the Recapture – Norland

=== Animation ===
- Angel's Friends – Gas
- Astonishing X-Men: Gifted – Colossus
- The Boy Who Wanted to Be a Bear – Father Bear
- Chaotic – Mezzmarr, Tangath Toborn, Codemaster Imthor and Tartarek
- G.I. Joe Sigma 6 – Lt. Stone
- GoGoRiki – Pogoriki (4Kids dub)
- Huntik: Secrets & Seekers – Montehue, Clease, Zan-Tanos, Lord Casterwill, The Oracle
- Hammerboy – Moonk
- The Incredible Crash Dummies – Crash (4Kids dub)
- Kappa Mikey – additional voices
- Mission Odyssey – Ulysses
- Pat & Stan – Pat
- Polar Krush – PK the Polar Bear, Gordon the Gorilla, Maurice the Mammoth
- Robotomy – additional voices
- Stickin' Around – additional voices
- Teenage Mutant Ninja Turtles – Mortu, Commander Mozar, Mephos, The Professor
- Thumb Wrestling Federation – Ring Announcer, Corbata, Tom Cat, Snagglefangs, Sick Vick
- Viva Piñata – Hudson Horstachio, King Roario
- Winx Club – Sky, Pegataur elder (4Kids dub), Ice Guardian/Spirit

=== Animated films ===
- Gladiformers – Patrion Tokal
- The Little Panda Fighter - Pancada
- Ratatoing – Carlos
- Turtles Forever – 1988 Leonardo

=== Live-action ===
- Beautiful Hunter – Man 7
- The Bondage Master – Shiro
- Cutie Honey – Black Claw
- Close Your Eyes and Hold Me – Amane
- Exte: Hair Extensions – Kiyomi's Boyfriend
- The Machine Girl – Yusuke
- Magic in the Water – Radar
- Naughty Guide to Tokyo Nightlife – Tsuruta
- Scorpion's Revenge – Jimmy Yoshioka
- Zero Woman: The Accused – Detective

=== Video games ===
- PlayStation All-Stars Battle Royale – Professor
- Shaman King video games – Silva, Lee Pai-Long
  - Shaman King: Power of Spirit – Ashcroft, Homunculus, Mysterious Mask
  - Shaman King: Master of Spirits – Store Clerk
  - Shaman King: Master of Spirits 2 – Store Clerk
- Sonic the Hedgehog series – Knuckles the Echidna (2005–10)
  - Shadow the Hedgehog
  - Sonic Riders
  - Sonic '06 – also played Mephiles the Dark
  - Sonic Rivals
  - Sonic and the Secret Rings – Sinbad the Sailor
  - Mario & Sonic at the Olympic Games
  - Sonic Rivals 2
  - Sonic Riders: Zero Gravity
  - Sonic and the Black Knight – Sir Gawain
  - Mario & Sonic at the Olympic Winter Games
  - Sonic & Sega All-Stars Racing
- Teenage Mutant Ninja Turtles video games – Mortu, Commander Mozar (uncredited)
  - Battle Nexus
  - Mutant Nightmare
- The Bureau: XCOM Declassified – Dr. Scott, Major Nigrosh, additional voices
- Ultimate Muscle: Legends vs. New Generation – Robin Mask, Buffaloman, Warsman
- Yu-Gi-Oh! video games – Yugi Muto/Yami Yugi
  - Yu-Gi-Oh! Destiny Board Traveler – Yugi Muto/Yami Yugi
  - Yu-Gi-Oh! Capsule Monsters Coliseum – Yugi Muto/Yami Yugi
  - Duel Terminals – Trudge
  - Yu-Gi-Oh! Duel Links – Yugi Muto/Yami Yugi, Officer Tetsu Trudge
  - Power of Chaos: Yugi the Destiny
  - Yu-Gi-Oh! Reshef of Destruction – Yugi Muto/Yami Yugi

=== Production credits ===
==== Dubbing director ====
- Astonishing X-Men: Gifted
- Iron Man: Extremis
- Jungle Emperor Leo (co-directed with Michael Sinterniklaas)
- Knight Hunters Eternity
- Mobile Suit Gundam Unicorn (co-directed with Michael Sinterniklaas and Marc Diraison)
- Phoenix
- Samurai Deeper Kyo
- Shura no Toki: Age of Chaos
- The Gokusen

==== Script adaptation ====
- Domain of Murder
- Knight Hunters Eternity
- Kurokami: The Animation (co-written with Marc Diraison)
- Mobile Suit Gundam Unicorn (co-written with Michael Sinterniklaas and Stephanie Sheh)
- Phoenix
- Queen's Blade
- Revolutionary Girl Utena
- Seven of Seven
- Shura no Toki: Age of Chaos

==== Miscellaneous crew ====
- G.I. Joe: Sigma 6 (co-executive producer)
- Iron Man: Extremis (casting director, audio producer)

== Notes ==
Preceded by Scott Dreier	English voice of Knuckles the Echidna (video games); 2005-2010	Succeeded by Travis Willingham
Preceded by Brian Drummond	English voice of Knuckles the Echidna (broadcast TV series); 2003-2006	Succeeded by Travis Willingham
Preceded by Bill Wise	English voice of Knuckles the Echidna (anime); 2003-2006	Succeeded by TBA
Preceded by Phillip Bartlett	English voice of Mewtwo (anime); 2001	Succeeded by Miriam Pultro
