= List of Shaman King video games =

Many video games based on the manga and anime Shaman King have been released. Later games featured many manga-exclusive stories that the anime never covered. This allowed such characters as Redseb and Sati Saigan to be featured.

== Video games ==
Title	Details
Shaman King Chou Senjiryakketsu: Meramera Version Original release date(s): JP: December 21, 2001	Release years by system: 2001 — Game Boy Color
Shaman King Chou Senjiryakketsu: Meramera Version Original release date(s): JP: December 21, 2001	Notes: Published by King Records, developed by Studio Saizensen
Shaman King Chou Senjiryakketsu: Funbari Version Original release date(s): JP: December 21, 2001	Release years by system: 2001 — Game Boy Color
Shaman King Chou Senjiryakketsu: Funbari Version Original release date(s): JP: December 21, 2001	Notes: Published by King Records, developed by Studio Saizensen
Shaman King: Spirit of Shamans Original release date(s): JP: June 6, 2002	Release years by system: 2002 — PlayStation
Shaman King: Spirit of Shamans Original release date(s): JP: June 6, 2002	Notes: Published by Bandai, developed by Dimps
Shaman King Chou Senjiryakketsu 2 Original release date(s): JP: July 26, 2002	Release years by system: 2002 — Game Boy Advance
Shaman King Chou Senjiryakketsu 2 Original release date(s): JP: July 26, 2002	Notes: Published by King Records, developed by Studio Saizensen
Shaman King: Asu e no Ishi Original release date(s): JP: August 29, 2002	Release years by system: 2002 — WonderSwan Color
Shaman King: Asu e no Ishi Original release date(s): JP: August 29, 2002	Notes: Published by Bandai, developed by Graphic Research
Shaman King Chou Senjiryakketsu 3 Original release date(s): JP: December 13, 2002	Release years by system: 2002 — Game Boy Advance
Shaman King Chou Senjiryakketsu 3 Original release date(s): JP: December 13, 2002	Notes: Published by King Records, developed by Studio Saizensen
Shaman King: Soul Fight Original release date(s): JP: March 28, 2003	Release years by system: 2003 — GameCube
Shaman King: Soul Fight Original release date(s): JP: March 28, 2003	Notes: Published by Bandai, developed by Tuning Electronic
Shaman King: Funbari Spirits Original release date(s): JP: April 8, 2004	Release years by system: 2004 — PlayStation 2
Shaman King: Funbari Spirits Original release date(s): JP: April 8, 2004	Notes: Published by Bandai, developed by Dimps
Shaman King: Master of Spirits Original release date(s): NA: November 9, 2004; EU: September 16, 2005	Release years by system: 2004 — Game Boy Advance
Shaman King: Master of Spirits Original release date(s): NA: November 9, 2004; EU: September 16, 2005	Notes: Published and developed by Konami
Shaman King: Power of Spirit Original release date(s): NA: November 9, 2004; EU: November 25, 2005	Release years by system: 2004 — PlayStation 2
Shaman King: Power of Spirit Original release date(s): NA: November 9, 2004; EU: November 25, 2005	Notes: Published by Konami, developed by Winkysoft
Shaman King: Legacy of the Spirits, Soaring Hawk Original release date(s): NA: February 8, 2005	Release years by system: 2005 — Game Boy Advance
Shaman King: Legacy of the Spirits, Soaring Hawk Original release date(s): NA: February 8, 2005	Notes: Published and developed by Konami
Shaman King: Legacy of the Spirits, Sprinting Wolf Original release date(s): NA: February 8, 2005	Release years by system: 2005 — Game Boy Advance
Shaman King: Legacy of the Spirits, Sprinting Wolf Original release date(s): NA: February 8, 2005	Notes: Published and developed by Konami
Shaman King: Master of Spirits 2 Original release date(s): NA: August 2, 2005; EU: February 17, 2006	Release years by system: 2005 — Game Boy Advance
Shaman King: Master of Spirits 2 Original release date(s): NA: August 2, 2005; EU: February 17, 2006	Notes: Published and developed by Konami

=== Other games ===
Title	Details
Jump Super Stars Original release date(s): JP: August 8, 2005	Release years by system: 2005 – Nintendo DS
Jump Super Stars Original release date(s): JP: August 8, 2005	Notes: Published by Nintendo, developed by Nintendo and Ganbarion; Features one stage and seven characters from the Shaman King series (two of them playable)
Jump Ultimate Stars Original release date(s): JP: November 23, 2006	Release years by system: 2006 – Nintendo DS
Jump Ultimate Stars Original release date(s): JP: November 23, 2006	Notes: Published by Nintendo, developed by Nintendo and Ganbarion; Features one stage and eight characters from the Shaman King series (two of them playable)
