= Conspiracy Entertainment =

American video game developer and publisher

- Type: Private Company
- Industry: Computer software, video games
- Founded: 1997; 29 years ago
- Headquarters: Long Beach, California, United States
- Key people: Sirus Ahmadi (President & CEO)

Conspiracy Entertainment (formerly Conspiracy Games) is an American third-party developer and video game publisher, publishing games from smaller companies that would face difficulties distributing games themselves. The company has also developed a few games of its own.

== History ==
Conspiracy Entertainment was originally founded in 1997 by Thomas Brockhage. Its initial purpose was to develop titles for the Game Boy Color. The company's first title, Logical came out in 1999, and it was published by Sunsoft with Electro Source handling distribution.

The company then entered into a partnership with Electro Source, who was distributing Sunsoft's games, to form Classified Games as a game publishing label. The company then begin developing games for the Sega Dreamcast. The company then moved on to producing games for next generation consoles. In 2001, the Classified Games label was discontinued and started publishing games under the Conspiracy label and was signed with SVG Distribution.

In 2002, the company signed a distribution deal with Vivendi Universal Games, in order to act as a distributor for Conspiracy's video game titles. In 2003, the company signed a deal with rapper Eminem to do a licensed game for the PC and PlayStation. The company then later owed $5 million in royalties after a lawsuit was filed.

In 2006, the company opened a office for the United Kingdom, as its titles were previously distributed in Europe by Swing! Entertainment.

== Games published ==
=== Dreamcast ===
- Bangai-O
- Record of Lodoss War: Advent of Cardice

=== Game Boy Advance ===
- An American Tail: Fievel's Gold Rush
- Animaniacs: Lights, Camera, Action!
- The Flintstones: Big Trouble in Bedrock
- Gadget Racers
- The Land Before Time
- Road Trip: Shifting Gears
- Tiny Toon Adventures: Buster's Bad Dream
- Tiny Toon Adventures: Wacky Stackers

=== Game Boy Color ===
- The Land Before Time
- Tiny Toon Adventures: Buster Saves the Day
- Tom & Jerry: Mouse Hunt
- Tiny Toon Adventures: Dizzy's Candy Quest
- Puzzled

=== GameCube ===
- Animaniacs: The Great Edgar Hunt
- Rally Championship
- Road Trip: The Arcade Edition
- Tiny Toon Adventures: Defenders of the Universe (cancelled)

=== Nintendo DS ===
- Dragon's Lair
- Flipper Critters
- Jeff Corwin Experience
- Panzer Tactics DS
- Power Play Pool
- Witches & Vampires
- Virtual Villagers: A New Home

=== PlayStation ===
- The Amazing Virtual Sea-Monkeys
- Creatures
- Rescue Copter
- Marble Master
- Tiny Toon Adventures: Plucky's Big Adventure

=== PlayStation 2 ===
- Animaniacs: The Great Edgar Hunt
- Garfield: Lasagna World Tour
- Gadget Racers
- Hidden Invasion
- Road Trip Adventure
- Phantasy Star Trilogy (cancelled)
- Seek and Destroy
- Sega Classics Collection
- Stretch Panic
- Tiny Toon Adventures: Defenders of the Universe (cancelled)
- Tremors
- X10

=== PlayStation Portable ===
- Dream Models
- Jeff Corwin Experience
- Pocket Pool
- Ultimate Block Party

=== Wii ===
- America's Next Top Model
- Anubis II
- Billy the Wizard: Rocket Broomstick Racing
- Counter Force
- Myth Makers Super Kart GP
- Ninjabread Man
- Octomania
- Real Heroes: Firefighter
- Winter Sports: The Ultimate Challenge
- Winter Sports 2: The Next Challenge
- Rock 'n' Roll Adventures
- Safari Adventures Africa

=== Microsoft Windows ===
- Enclave
- Johnny Rocketfingers 2
- Tremors
- X10

=== Xbox 360 ===
- Autobahn Polizei
- Superbike World Championship
- Winter Sports 2

== Games developed ==
=== PC ===
- Blaze & Blade: Eternal Quest

=== Game Boy Color ===
- Logical
- Magical Drop
- Microsoft Puzzle Collection
- Tom & Jerry: Mouse Hunt

=== PlayStation ===
- Mix TV Presents: Eminem
