= 2K6 =

2K6 may refer to:

- the year 2006
- 2K6 Luna, Soviet short-range artillery rocket complex
- College Hoops 2K6, 2005 video game
- Major League Baseball 2K6, 2006 video game
- NBA 2K6, 2005 video game
- NHL 2K6, 2005 video game
