= Pocket Pool =

2007 video game

- North American box art of Pocket Pool
- Developer: Hyper-Devbox
- Publisher: Conspiracy Entertainment
- Platform: PlayStation Portable
- Release: NA: April 17, 2007
- Genre: Sports
- Modes: Single-player, multiplayer

Pocket Pool is a game released for the PlayStation Portable gaming system, developed in France by Hyper-Devbox Japan and published by Conspiracy Entertainment exclusively in North America. The game was originally expected to have the Girls Gone Wild license but the publishers were unable to negotiate terms.

== Gameplay ==
The game is a 3D pool game, featuring 13 different play modes. Players can set the speed of the balls before they start a match. Players use the d-pad to aim and to adjust the power of their shots, and can adjust the spin and angle of their shots as well. Players can preview where the ball will land after a shot, and can change the camera angle to have a better idea of the playing field.

The game includes ad-hoc local multiplayer.

Every time the player wins a match, they unlock a new table, cue stick, set of balls, or an erotic image or video of one of the various models presented in the game, which can be viewed using a basic gallery feature.

== Reception ==
Reception

Aggregate score
Aggregator	Score
Metacritic	37/100

Review scores
Publication	Score
GameSpot	3.4/10
GameZone	3.8/10
IGN	4/10

The game was mostly panned, with critics considering the game to have poor physics and disappointing unlockable items.

== Tie-ins ==
All of the model videos featured in the game were released by Conspiracy Theory under the title Dream Models, a UMD movie.
