= Flipper Critters =

2007 video game

- box art of European release
- Developer: Zen Studios
- Publisher: Europe: Conspiracy Entertainment; NA: Ignition Entertainment
- Platform: Nintendo DS
- Release: October 9, 2007
- Genre: Pinball

Flipper Critters is a 2007 pinball video game developed by Zen Studios, and published by Conspiracy Entertainment and Ignition Entertainment.

== Gameplay ==
split-screen showing two parts of a playfield

The player takes the role of a tiger with a monkey companion to play through a series of nine quests inhabited by various "critters". Flippers are controlled to knock a ball around, and certain objects can be moved using the touch screen. The game can use both screens as a single display, or at times show two independent views of the playfield. Between pinball levels the game has several mini-games.

== Development ==
The website for the game launched in November 2005, with an anticipated release date for the game in early 2006. During its development in 2006 the game was the first Nintendo DS game to be designed with full 3D on both screens Ignition Entertainment was announced as publisher of the game in November 2006, with an anticipated release date of spring 2007. This release was delayed to October 9, 2007.

== Reception ==
Reception

Aggregate score
| Aggregator | Score |
|---|---|
| Metacritic | 60 |

Review scores
| Publication | Score |
|---|---|
| IGN | 6.5/10 |
| Nintendo Power | 4.5/10 |
| Pocket Gamer | 60% |

IGN found the goals of the game often hard to understand, but praised the pinball part of the game, and enjoyed some of the puzzle elements. The budget launch price of the game was praised.

Pocket Gamer found the use of platformer elements mixed with pinball to be interesting, and while a "solid" game it was not as good as an average pinball or platformer game. The ability to replay sub-games such as an R-type clone was praised.

Nintendo Power criticized the lack of in-game instructions.
