= Winter Sports 2: The Next Challenge =

2008 video game

- Developer: 49 Games
- Publishers: NA: Conspiracy Entertainment; EU: RTL Games
- Platforms: Xbox 360, PlayStation 2, Wii, Nintendo DS
- Release: NA: November 18, 2008; NA: November 25, 2008 (Wii); EU: November 27, 2008; EU: November 28, 2008 (PS2)
- Genre: Sports
- Modes: Single-player, multiplayer

Winter Sports 2: The Next Challenge, known in Europe as Winter Sports 2009: The Next Challenge, is a multi-sport simulation released in 2008 for the Xbox 360, PlayStation 2, Wii, and Nintendo DS. It was developed by German studio 49 Games and is the sequel to Winter Sports: The Ultimate Challenge. The game features 16 winter sports events in 10 different disciplines with 16 countries represented.

== Sports and events ==
- Downhill skiing
- Super-G, slalom, and giant slalom
- Ski jumping
  - Normal hill
  - Large hill
- Snowboarding halfpipe
- Bobsledding
  - Two-women
  - Four-man
- Women's luge
  - Men's skeleton
- Speed skating
  - 500m
  - 1500m
- Curling
- Biathlon
- Figure skating

== Reception ==
Reception

Aggregate score
Aggregator	Score			
Aggregator	DS	PS2	Wii	Xbox 360
Metacritic	51/100	47/100	52/100	41/100

Review scores
Publication	Score			
Publication	DS	PS2	Wii	Xbox 360
Famitsu	N/A	N/A	24/40	N/A
GamesMaster	54%	N/A	N/A	N/A
GameZone	N/A	N/A	4/10	N/A
IGN	4.1/10	4/10	N/A	4.5/10
NGamer	58%	N/A	58%	N/A
Official Nintendo Magazine	N/A	N/A	59%	N/A
Official Xbox Magazine (UK)	N/A	N/A	N/A	5/10
Official Xbox Magazine (US)	N/A	N/A	N/A	4/10

The DS and Wii versions received "mixed" reviews, while the PlayStation 2 and Xbox 360 versions received "generally unfavorable reviews", according to the review aggregation website Metacritic. In Japan, where the Wii version was ported and published by Arc System Works on March 19, 2009, Famitsu gave it a score of all four sixes for a total of 24 out of 40.

== See also ==
- Winter Sports: The Ultimate Challenge
