= Sky Surfer =

2000 video game

Ultimate Sky Surfer
- Japanese box art
- Developer: Toka
- Publishers: JP: Idea Factory; EU: Midas Interactive Entertainment
- Platform: PlayStation 2
- Release: JP: April 20, 2000; EU: July 6, 2001
- Genre: Sports
- Mode: Single-player

Ultimate Sky Surfer, known as simply Sky Surfer (スカイサーファー, Sukai Sāfā), is a video game developed by Toka and published by Idea Factory and Midas Interactive Entertainment for PlayStation 2 in 2000-2001.

== Reception ==
Reception

Aggregate score
Aggregator	Score
GameRankings	45%

Review scores
Publication	Score
4Players	26%
Famitsu	22/40
GameFan	29%
GameSpot	3.9/10
Next Generation	1/5
PlayStation Official Magazine – UK	3/10
Play	91%

The game received unfavorable reviews according to the review aggregation website GameRankings. Frank O'Connor of NextGen called the Japanese import "A game so dull and listless that it almost defines the concept of duff launch software." In Japan, Famitsu gave it a score of 22 out of 40.
