= HyperDevbox Japan =

Video game company

- Founder: Carlo Perconti
- Headquarters: Tokyo, Japan

HyperDevbox Japan (previously known as Hyper-Devbox) is a French-Japanese video game company created by Carlo Perconti, one of the founders of Toka and Arcade Zone. HyperDevbox Japan is developing original games, mostly for Android, and also porting external titles from one platform to another. The Company is now based exclusively in Tokyo, Japan. HyperDevbox Japan is known for its breaking technology developed for the Android platform with games like ExZeus arcade and the upcoming "Spectral Souls - Resurrection of the Ethereal Empires" (from Idea factory) the first Tactical RPG to be announced for Android devices.

== Works ==
- ExZeus - 2003-2009
- Pocket Pool - (PlayStation Portable), 2004
- Pool Party - (Wii), 2007
- Real SnowGlobe - (iPhone OS app)
- LoveCatch - (iPhone OS app)
- ExZeus 2 - iOS, Android, Windows Phone, Microsoft Windows, 2012
- Indy 500 Arcade Racing - Android, 2014

=== Porting work ===
- Octomania - (Wii), 2007
- Record of Agarest War - iOS, Android, 2013
