= Shaman King: Funbari Spirits =

2004 video game

- Developer(s): Dimps
- Publisher(s): Bandai
- Series: Shaman King
- Platform(s): PlayStation 2
- Release: JP: April 8, 2004
- Genre(s): Fighting
- Mode(s): Single player, Multiplayer

Shaman King: Funbari Spirits (Japanese: シャーマンキング ふんばりスピリッツ, Hepburn: Shāman Kingu Funbari Supirittsu), is a cel-shaded 2D style fighting game released in Japan only on April 8, 2004. It is not to be confused with Shaman King: Power of Spirit, a game produced by Konami to go along with the 4kids Entertainment dub. It is a pseudo-sequel to Shaman King: Spirit of Shamans, a 2D fighting game for the PlayStation. This game is based upon the manga. This is the last Shaman King game to be released in Japan.

== Gameplay ==
Funbari Spirits features simple controls and plays like a 2D fighter despite being 3D. The modes include a 2 player mode, an adventure mode, a mini game mode, and a free play mode along with a training mode. The game also has the voice actors from the original anime, as well as cel-shaded graphics. All of the main characters are present as playable characters, along with a few characters that only appear in this game.

Yoh fighting Satei.

== Characters ==
- Yoh Asakura
- Tao Ren
- Ryu
- Horohoro
- Faust VIII
- Chocolove
- Lyserg Diethel
- Marco
- Iron Maiden Jeanne
- Anna Kyoyama
- Manta Oyamada
- Hao Asakura
- Redseb (only appeared in the manga)
- Sati Saigan (only appeared in the manga)
- Sennjuu (from Hiroyuki Takei's first manga, Butsu Zone)

== Reception ==
The game was criticized for having a tedious combat system.
