= Burning Road =

1996 video game

- European box art
- Developer: Toka
- Publishers: EU: Funsoft GmbH; NA: Playmates Interactive; JP: Vic Tokai
- Platform: PlayStation
- Release: NA: 30 September 1996; PAL: 15 November 1996; JP: 31 January 1997
- Genre: Racing
- Modes: Single player, multiplayer

Burning Road is a 1996 racing video game developed by Toka for the PlayStation. An arcade-style racer, it is heavily inspired by Sega's arcade hit Daytona USA. It received a sequel in 1997, titled Explosive Racing.

== Gameplay ==
Players are timed in races and must race through checkpoints to gain more time. Players are timed to pick a track, a car and the transmission, like in arcade games. There are three difficulty levels: Easy, Medium and Hard.

In-game, there is a 'traffic' radar showing the player where opponents are surrounding the player's car only. The opponent in the lead has a silver cup icon above their vehicle. If the player gets in the lead, text saying 'race leader' displays at the top of the screen for a second.

The game has three modes. Practice mode is the equivalent to single race found in other racing games. It is possible to unlock the mirrored versions of the three tracks (bringing the track total to six) in this mode. There are seven AI opponents in this mode.

In Championship mode, players race on all the tracks in order with a chosen car. Players must beat a certain time to qualify for the next track. As in practice, there are seven AI opponents.

Link mode is a multiplayer mode using the PlayStation Link Cable. Players can race against one other human opponent only; there are no AI opponents in this mode.

There are four vehicles, consisting of three cars and a monster truck. Players can also choose automatic or manual transmission.

== Reception ==
Reception

Review scores
Publication	Score
Famitsu	6/10, 4/10, 6/10, 7/10
GameSpot	6/10
Next Generation	3/5

Jeff Gerstmann of GameSpot described Burning Road as "for the most part, a Daytona USA wannabe", particularly noting that the graphics are blockier than those of Daytona USA. However, he concluded that "while it lacks innovation, it's solid enough to compete dollar-for-dollar with Ridge Racer Revolution." GamePro's Johnny Ballgame instead considered it a rip-off of Ridge Racer, and assessed that "its lack of solid features will drive you to disappointment with only six easy tracks and no two-player split-screen option." He also said it had "the worst theme song in video game history." A Next Generation critic was also displeased with the low quantity and difficulty of the tracks, but was complimentary towards the graphics, frame rate, and opponent AI. He noted that the "'bumper car' mentality" of the game would likely offend racing purists, and summarized that "Burning Road is entertaining in its own right, but lacking in just enough of the essentials to prevent it from being a superior game."
