= Soul Fighter =

1999 video game

- North American cover art
- Developer: Toka
- Publishers: NA: Red Orb Entertainment; EU: Mindscape
- Platform: Dreamcast
- Release: NA: November 23, 1999; UK: December 10, 1999
- Genre: Beat 'em up
- Mode: Single-player

Soul Fighter is a 3D beat 'em up video game developed by Toka and published by TLC Multimedia for the Sega Dreamcast in 1999.

== Gameplay ==
The gameplay centers around martial art styles of combat and using a small selection of weapons.

== Plot ==
An evil spell of Queen Antea has fallen on the Kingdom of Gomar. As a mysterious mist envelops the kingdom, the inhabitants turn into vicious creatures. A fearless warrior (Altus), a female spy (Sayomi), and a powerful wizard (Orion) have escaped the fate of their fellow villagers. They must now search for and capture souls in order to reverse the curse.

== Development ==
Soul Fighter was developed by the French company Toka with help from upstart company Piggyback Interactive. The 15-person team at Toka created the game using the 3dfx Interactive Glide API for PC hardware in the same fashion as Midway Games' San Francisco Rush, NFL Blitz, and NBA Showtime. Although Soul Fighter cannot be run with Glide on the Dreamcast, the software allowed Toka to port the game from the PC to console in less than three weeks.

Production on Soul Fighter was originally set to be finished in July 1999 with the game slated for release at the North American launch of the Dreamcast. A delay set its release back to an October ship date. After settling on a publisher in Mindscape, Soul Fighter was delayed again from an October 1999 release to the following month. Piggyback consulted with a Japanese publisher at one point to transform Soul Fighter into an arcade game; the company had also considered a version for the PlayStation 2. A planned port of the game for the GameCube was announced but eventually cancelled.

== Reception ==
Reception

Aggregate score
Aggregator	Score
GameRankings	46%

Review scores
Publication	Score
AllGame	1/5
CNET Gamecenter	6/10
Edge	3/10
Electronic Gaming Monthly	3.125/10 (Note: Four critics of Electronic Gaming Monthly gave the game each a score of 2/10, 4.5/10, 2.5/10, and 3.5/10.)
EP Daily	5.5/10
Game Informer	5.5/10
GameFan	63%
GameRevolution	C+
GameSpot	4.8/10
GameSpy	1.5/10
IGN	2.5/10
Next Generation	1/5

Soul Fighter received unfavorable reviews according to the review aggregation website GameRankings. Blake Fischer of NextGen called it the first spinning-world simulator to run at 60fps. GamePro, however, said, "Even with all of its faults, Soul Fighter might be worth a weekend rental if you enjoy a straight, no-brains brawling quest - you Dynamite Cop fans should take note. But with better Dreamcast games in its own genre like Draconus: Cult of the Wyrm coming along, it might be better just to let the kingdom of Gomar go all to hell." (Note: GamePro gave the game 4/5 for graphics, 2.5/5 for sound, 2/5 for control, and 3/5 for fun factor.)
