= Winter Sports: The Ultimate Challenge =

2007 video game

- Wii version cover art
- Developer: 49 Games
- Publishers: NA: Conspiracy Entertainment; EU: RTL Games
- Platforms: Wii, PlayStation 2, Windows
- Release: EU: November 30, 2007; NA: December 11, 2007
- Genre: Sports
- Modes: Single-player, multiplayer

Winter Sports: The Ultimate Challenge (called RTL Winter Sports 2008: The Ultimate Challenge in Europe) is a multi-sport simulation developed by German studio 49 Games released in 2007 for the PlayStation 2, Wii, and Microsoft Windows. It was developed by 49 Games, the developers of Torino 2006.

== Sports and events ==
- Downhill skiing
- Super-G, slalom, and giant slalom
- Ski jumping
  - Normal hill
  - Large Hill
- Bobsledding
  - Two-man
  - Four-man
- Men's luge
  - Men's skeleton
- Speed skating
  - 500m
  - 1000m
- Curling
- Cross-country skiing
- Figure skating

== Reception ==
Reception

Aggregate score
Aggregator	Score	
Aggregator	PS2	Wii
Metacritic	60/100	52/100

Review scores
Publication	Score	
Publication	PS2	Wii
Game Informer	N/A	6.5/10
GameRevolution	N/A	D
GameSpot	N/A	4.5/10
GamesRadar+	N/A	2/5
GameTrailers	N/A	4.7/10
GameZone	N/A	6/10
IGN	6/10	5.5/10
X-Play	N/A	3/5
The New York Times	N/A	(positive)

The PlayStation 2 and Wii versions received "mixed" reviews according to the review aggregation website Metacritic.

== See also ==
- Torino 2006
- Winter Sports 2: The Next Challenge
- List of Wii games
