= Octomania =

2007 video game

- Developers: Compile Heart, Idea Factory, Hyper-Devbox Japan (Wii port)
- Publishers: JP: Idea Factory; NA: Conspiracy Entertainment
- Platforms: Wii, arcade
- Release: JP: August 23, 2007; NA: March 25, 2008
- Genre: Puzzle
- Modes: Single-player, multiplayer
- Arcade system: Sega NAOMI GD-ROM

Octomania (Noumiso Konekone Puzzle Takoron also Sharuui * Takoron in Japan) is a puzzle game by Compile Heart and Idea Factory for the Wii. It is an enhanced version of an arcade title released in 2006 running on Sega NAOMI hardware. Hyper-Devbox Japan helped port the game to the Wii by creating libraries so that the programmers could easily just recompile the source code of the arcade game, and then add new features. The game was published in North America by Conspiracy Entertainment.

== Gameplay ==
The player uses the Wii Remote to control a 2x2 cursor over a field of colored octopuses. Pressing the A button causes the octopuses under the cursor to rotate counter-clockwise. Numbered nets are scattered around the playing field. If the player arranges a number of same-colored octopuses under the net, the octopuses under the net, as well as any other octopuses of the same color which are connected orthogonally, are removed.

By removing octopuses in this way, the player can send sea urchins to their opponents playing field. Sea urchins can not be removed using nets, but are removed if they are orthogonal to other octopuses being removed, similar to ojama puyos in Puyo Puyo. If the player's field fills up for 3 seconds, they lose.

The game features both a single player story mode, and a multiplayer mode for up to four players. Online play is also included using the Nintendo Wi-Fi Connection.

== Plot ==
It's just another day in Lonronpia and Kari, an apprentice magician, decides to summon up some of her favorite treat, takoyaki. But instead of delicious takoyaki appearing, a shower of colored octopuses rain down from the sky. A guardian angel appears and informs Kari that she must rid Lonronpia of the octopuses. Now, she must embark on a journey to find the demon prince, Exaltus.
