= Hidden Invasion =

2001 video game

- Developer: Toka
- Publishers: EU: Swing! Entertainment; NA: Conspiracy Entertainment
- Designers: Lyes Belaidouni; Soufiene Belaidouni; Carlo Perconti
- Writer: Lyes Belaidouni
- Platform: PlayStation 2
- Release: EU: December 7, 2001; NA: July 29, 2002
- Genre: Action
- Modes: Single-player, multiplayer

Hidden Invasion is a video game developed by Toka. The European version was published by Swing! Entertainment Media AG in 2001 and the American version by Conspiracy Entertainment in 2002, both for the PlayStation 2. GameCube and Xbox versions were also announced but were later canceled.

== Overview ==
Players are given the option of playing as either one of two playable characters, Dean Travis or Karen Bride. The two playable characters possess different stats and abilities allowing for multiple strategies. Players venture through multiple levels in seven stages. The camera is set allowing the player to see only an area of a level. Once the player leaves an area, the camera switches to the camera in the new area.

In the year 2027, one or two members of the Shadowforce Team is sent to assassinate the leader of a "terrorist" organization who has taken a hospital hostage in Alpha City. After defeating the terrorist boss, the agent is attacked by an unknown creature. When the Shadowforce agent recovers, a surviving "terrorist" explains a conspiracy in which aliens are attempting to take over Earth. The agent must then defeat the invading aliens.

== Development ==
Hidden Invasion was showcased at E3 2002.

== Reception ==
Reception

Aggregate score
Aggregator	Score
Metacritic	39/100

Review scores
Publication	Score
AllGame	1.5/5
IGN	3.5/10
Jeuxvideo.com	10/20
Official U.S. PlayStation Magazine	3/5

The game received "unfavorable" reviews according to the review aggregation website Metacritic.
