= Pool Party (video game) =

2007 video game

- European box art
- Developer(s): HyperDevbox Japan
- Publisher(s): SouthPeak Games
- Platform(s): Wii
- Release: NA: 5 September 2007; EU: 18 July 2008; AU: 7 August 2008
- Genre(s): sports simulation – pool & snooker
- Mode(s): Single-player or multiplayer

Pool Party is a sports simulation video game for the Wii, published by SouthPeak Games and developed by HyperDevbox Japan. It includes 13 different styles of cue sports, including nine-ball and eight-ball pool, and snooker.

== Reception ==
Reception

Aggregate score
Aggregator	Score
Metacritic	32/100

Review scores
Publication	Score
GamesMaster	35%
GameSpot	5/10
IGN	2.4/10

The game received "unfavorable" reviews according to the review aggregation website Metacritic. N-Europe slammed the game as "badly done shovelware" which felt like a quick cash-in on the Wii's success and control scheme. GameSpot said, "twitchy controls and poor presentation eclipse what little fun there is to be had with this middling billiards game."
