= The Flintstones: Big Trouble in Bedrock =

2001 video game

- Developer: H2O Entertainment
- Publishers: EU: Swing! Entertainment; NA: Conspiracy Entertainment
- Platform: Game Boy Advance
- Release: 30 December 2001
- Genre: Platformer
- Mode: Single-player

The Flintstones: Big Trouble in Bedrock is a 2001 platform video game for the Game Boy Advance developed by H2O Entertainment. As Fred Flintstone, players complete twelve platforming levels in search of Barney Rubble, who has been kidnapped by Dr. Sinister. Publisher Conspiracy Entertainment announced Big Trouble in Bedrock in 2000 ahead of the release of the Game Boy Advance, it is the first and only GBA game based on The Flintstones. Upon release, the game received negative reviews, with critics focusing on the game's limited features and poor graphics.

== Gameplay ==
A screenshot of Big Trouble in Bedrock.

Big Trouble in Bedrock is a platformer that takes place across twelve stages set across four areas: Bedrock, the Wild West, a Haunted House, and Dr. Sinister's Island. Players control Fred Flintstone and scale platforms and avoid spike pits, boulders and enemies. The player can use items collected throughout the level as weapons for a limited time, including bowling balls, clubs, and bones to ward off enemies. Power-ups are granted by the Great Gazoo, who is located several times in a level, that allow the player to use several abilities: a double jump, dash, invulnerability, judo chop, and full health restore. Collectable clams are dispersed throughout levels, with every 50 collected granting a Cactus Coolah that provide a temporary speed boost or a Bronto Rib that restore a hit point. The game has three difficulty modes and no save features.

== Plot ==
Fred Flintstone clocks off his shift at the quarry, and discovers that his friend Barney Rubble is missing and has been kidnapped by Dr. Sinister, who has overrun Bedrock with animated lawn mowers and barbecue grills. Playing as Fred, the player must navigate Bedrock and a series of areas in the Wild West, a Haunted House, and Dr. Sinister's Island to find his hideout and rescue his friend.

== Reception ==
Reception

Review scores
Publication	Score
AllGame	2.5/5
IGN	4/10
Jeuxvideo.com	7/20
Nintendo Official Magazine	64%

Big Trouble in Bedrock received negative reviews upon release. Jason White of Allgame critiqued the game's "fairly straightforward" gameplay for its "confusing" level design, "frustrating" platforming and the lack of variation and additional features to the game, describing the game as having "no real extras". IGN considered the game to control "pretty well", but considered the platforming to be "no fun" due to the number of "cheap hits and blind jumps" and "floating platforms", as well as critiquing the game's "identity crisis" in featuring levels with elements that "don't seem to fit with the show". Nintendo Official Magazine described the game as a "painful excuse for a platformer with a severe lack of originality in the gameplay department". Dismissing the game as "absolutely lamentable", JeuxVideo highlighted the game's "rotten" quality due to its "insulting graphics", "bland and flavorless gameplay" , "questionable handling", and imprecise collision and platforming.
