= Toka (company) =

Video game company

- Industry: Video game development
- Founded: 1995
- Founders: Carlo Perconti; Lyes Belaidouni
- Headquarters: France

Toka was a French video game company founded by Carlo Perconti and Lyes Belaidouni, founders of Arcade Zone and later HyperDevbox Japan. Toka is the second company started by the duo. The company was among the first to use Motion Capture technology.

== Works ==
- Adidas Power Soccer (PlayStation) 1995
- Burning Road (PlayStation) 1996
- Explosive Racing (PlayStation) 1997
- Legend (PlayStation) 1998
- Extreme Snow Break (PlayStation) 1998 - 3D engine
- Soul Fighter (Dreamcast) 1999
- Sky Surfer (PlayStation 2) 2000
- Hidden Invasion (PlayStation 2) 2001
- The Flintstones in Viva Rock Vegas (PlayStation 2) 2001
