= Nancy Drew: Secret of the Old Clock =

2005 video game

- Developer: Her Interactive
- Publisher: DreamCatcher
- Composer: Kevin Manthei
- Series: Nancy Drew
- Platform: Microsoft Windows
- Release: NA: July 12, 2005
- Genre: Adventure
- Mode: Single player

Secret of the Old Clock is the 12th installment in the Nancy Drew point-and-click adventure game series by Her Interactive. The game is available for play on Microsoft Windows platforms. It has an ESRB rating of E for moments of mild violence and peril. Players take on the first-person view of fictional amateur sleuth Nancy Drew and must solve the mystery through interrogation of suspects, solving puzzles, and discovering clues. There are two levels of gameplay, Junior and Senior detective modes, each offering a different difficulty level of puzzles and hints, however neither of these changes affect the actual plot of the game. The game was created to commemorate the 75th anniversary of Nancy Drew's creation. It is based on the first four Nancy Drew books published: The Secret of the Old Clock, The Hidden Staircase, The Bungalow Mystery, and The Mystery at Lilac Inn.

== Plot ==
In 1930, at the beginning of the Great Depression in the small fictional town of Titusville, Illinois, Nancy Drew is asked to come to the Lilac Inn to see 17-year-old Emily Crandall, whom Nancy knows through a mutual friend. Emily's mother, Gloria, who owned the inn, died a month prior, leaving Emily to run the inn with the help of her guardian, Gloria's close friend Jane Willoughby. Emily and Gloria had been counting on the generosity of their kindly but strange elderly neighbor, Josiah Crowley, to leave them part of his estate to support the inn. However, when Josiah died, his will left everything to Richard Topham, his ESP teacher who lives next door to the inn.

Nancy arrives at the inn, and Emily asks her to take her mother's precious jewelry and store it in Nancy's father's safe. While they are having this conversation, the inn's kitchen catches fire, and during the ensuing commotion, the jewelry is stolen. Nancy finds out from local banker Jim Archer that Gloria had let the insurance policy on the jewelry lapse. Jim also tells Nancy that his bank is struggling financially, and that he had also been promised money by Josiah Crowley before his will left everything to Richard Topham.

Nancy realizes that someone is trying to sabotage Emily and the inn, and also that Josiah's will may have been forged. She discovers that Josiah left clues and puzzles around the inn and surrounding properties that potentially point to his real will. Meanwhile, Jane expresses concern that Emily is hearing voices and might be on the verge of a breakdown; Jane is worried that when Emily turns 18 in three months and is no longer under her guardianship she will not be able to handle the responsibility of running the inn.

Nancy discovers a secret passageway in the inn that leads to a wall behind Emily's room, and realizes someone has been deliberately making her think she is hearing voices and losing her mind. After solving Josiah's puzzles, Nancy finally finds a key to a safe deposit box at Jim Archer's bank that belongs to Clara Pickford, a friendly local woman who used to visit the bank regularly. After opening the box, Nancy and Jim discover that Clara Pickford was really Josiah Crowley in drag, and in the box they find Josiah's real will along with a photo of Gloria Crandall and Jane Willoughby, whom Nancy realizes looks nothing like the Jane Willoughby she has been getting to know at the inn.

Nancy returns to the inn to confront "Jane" and finds her in the driveway about to leave. Nancy chases her in her car and ultimately cuts her off just before the state line, causing the impostor's car to crash. Nancy discovers that "Jane" is really a woman named Marion Aborn who had been staying at a rooming house with the real Jane. When Gloria died, Marion intercepted the letter asking Jane to become Emily's legal guardian, and sabotaged Emily and the inn with the goal of forcing Emily to sell it before she turned 18 so that Marion could collect half of the profits. Emily and Jim discover that Josiah Crowley did leave them the money he promised, but didn't leave anything for Topham, and both the inn and the bank will be financially sound for the foreseeable future.

== Development ==
=== Characters ===
- Nancy Drew - Nancy is an 18-year-old amateur detective from the fictional town of River Heights in the United States. She is the only playable character in the game, which means the player must solve the mystery from her perspective.
- Emily Crandall - 17-year-old Emily runs the Lilac Inn with the help of her guardian, Jane, while quietly mourning the recent loss of her mother. She is plagued by strange occurrences - objects on the wall move, whispers call from the shadows, and things mysteriously disappear and then reappear, she says. Could she be just paranoid, or is she guilty of something?
- Jane Willoughby - Gloria Crandall, Emily's mother, asked Jane to look after her daughter in case anything happened to her. Jane's doing her best to help Emily, but she doesn't know much about raising kids or running an inn. Jane is trying to convince Emily to sell the inn and split the profits with her. Could Jane have a hidden agenda?
- Richard Topham - A self-proclaimed expert on ESP, Richard Topham lives near the Lilac Inn, in the house that once belonged to Josiah Crowley. It now serves as Topham's "School for the Study and Development of Paranormal Powers". Topham was the one to inherit Josiah's estate and money, even though Josiah told Emily that she and her mother would be included in his will. How did Topham come to inherit Josiah's estate?
- Jim Archer - Jim Archer is a good-natured, but secretly desperate, businessman who is trying to make it through the Great Depression. Although he's always smiling, the bank he owns is teetering on the brink of failure. Would he forge a will, or steal Emily's mother's jewels, just to save his bank?

=== Cast ===
- Nancy Drew - Lani Minella
- Carson Drew - Dennis Regan
- Jane Willoughby - Sarah Papineau
- Emily Crandall - Walayn Sharples
- Richard Topham / Additional Voices - Tim Moore
- Jim Archer - Ben Laurance
- Mrs. O'Shea / Additional Voices - Amy Broomhall
- Miss Jakowski / Additional Voices - Megan Hill
- Mr. Phelps / Additional Voices - Chris Spott
- Tubby Telegram Guy / Additional Voices - Jonah von Spreekin
- Bess Marvin - Alisa Murray
- George Fayne - Patty Pomplun
- Uri the Cat - Cory the Cat

== Reception ==
According to review aggregation website Metacritic, Secret of the Old Clock received "generally favorable reviews" from critics. Charles Herold of The New York Times called Secret of the Old Clock "pleasant but inconsequential", and noted that it was "one of the shortest and easiest games in the series".

Preceded by Nancy Drew: Curse of Blackmoor Manor	Nancy Drew Computer Games	Succeeded by Nancy Drew: Last Train to Blue Moon Canyon
