= Animaniacs: The Great Edgar Hunt =

2005 video game

- Developer: Warthog Games
- Publisher: Ignition Entertainment
- Platforms: GameCube; Xbox; PlayStation 2
- Release: GameCube: PAL: May 27, 2005; NA: September 14, 2005; Xbox: PAL: October 14, 2005; PlayStation 2: PAL: June 24, 2005
- Genre: Action-adventure
- Mode: Single-player

Animaniacs: The Great Edgar Hunt is an action-adventure video game, released in North America, Europe and Australia in 2005. It is based on the cartoon series Animaniacs from Warner Bros. and features the same voice actors for the main characters. The game is one of multiple Animaniacs video games. It was released on the GameCube, PlayStation 2, and Xbox, with the latter two versions being released only in Europe, while the GameCube version was released in both Europe and North America. Originally, there was plans to bring the Xbox version to North America as well, but the idea was later scrapped.

== Plot ==
Frustrated by being "overlooked", film director C. C. Deville steals the "Edgars" (statuettes that are a parody of the Oscars) and threatens to melt them all unless studio chairman Thaddeus Plotz gives him a lucrative contract. While carrying out his evil plot, Deville's dim-witted assistant accidentally crashes his getaway blimp into the Warner Bros. water tower. This scatters 44 of the 45 stolen Edgars across the studio lot and releases Yakko, Wakko, and Dot, who agree to search for the missing awards. The many different types of levels include: Ye Old West, Spooky Movie, Once Upon A Time, King O'Sullivan's Mines, and The Epic. The final level takes place in the sky chasing and shooting down Deville's blimp. In the end, Ralph T. Guard and Plotz end up capturing Deville and the Warners, mistaking them to also be part of Deville's plan. As the Edgars ceremony finally continues, the Warners proceed to torment Deville, who got accidentally trapped in the water tower, which got rebuilt by Pinky and the Brain for one of their latest plans to take over the world, with the Warners.

== Reception ==
Reception

Aggregate score
Aggregator	Score
Metacritic	GCN: 65/100; Xbox: 58/100

Review scores
Publication	Score
GameSpot	GCN: 7.1/10
X-Play	GCN: 3/5

The game received "mixed or average" reviews, upon release, according to review aggregator Metacritic. GameSpot gave it 7.1 out of 10, stating that "The Great Edgar Hunt is a good, if not very original, platformer in its own right, offering up some funny writing and interesting environments to explore". According to GamingNexus, the game is "recommended to loyal fans of the series. It doesn't bring anything fresh to the gaming table, but offers a substantial adventure that should take at least six hours to complete. The quality is uncommon for a licensed title and the show's charm is intact for the most part. For adventure fans I suggest something meatier like Zelda; Edgar Hunt will be nothing but a passing amusement to the hardcore audience".
