= Judge Dredd: Dredd vs. Death =

2003 video game

- Developer: Rebellion Developments
- Publishers: EU: Vivendi Universal Games International (Note: Released under the Sierra Entertainment label.); NA: Evolved Games
- Platforms: PlayStation 2, Xbox, Windows, GameCube
- Release: PS2 & Xbox: EU: 17 October 2003; NA: 23 February 2005; Windows: EU: 17 October 2003; NA: 3 March 2005; GameCube: EU: 12 December 2003; NA: 1 March 2005
- Genre: First-person shooter
- Modes: Single-player, multiplayer

Judge Dredd: Dredd vs. Death is a first-person shooter video game based on the Judge Dredd character from the 2000 AD comic series, developed by Rebellion Developments.

== Gameplay ==
The game is played from a first-person perspective. The singleplayer campaign is made up of eleven levels in which the player takes the role of Judge Dredd and battles a series of criminals and undead vampires. Easy, Normal and Hard difficulty levels are available, as well as a cooperative mode.

The game features a 'law meter' which gauges the player's adherence to the laws of Mega-City One. Completing objectives and arresting criminals raises the law meter; attacking criminals without first challenging them to surrender will deplete the law meter. Attacking Judges, civilians, and criminals that have surrendered will also deplete the law meter, with a more severe penalty if they are killed. Using incendiary ammunition on humans (even if they are hostile) will severely deplete the law meter. If the law meter is fully depleted the current level will become unwinnable, and the Special Judicial Squad will arrive to execute the player. After each campaign mission, the player is awarded a ranking of Cadet, Rookie, Street Judge, Senior Judge, or Judge Dredd. Completing singleplayer levels also unlocks at least one playable multiplayer character or map, depending on the player's performance.

The game also features arcade and multiplayer mode. In the arcade mode, the player must complete various challenges, earning cheat codes for each one completed with a high rank. There are 12 arcade challenges to complete. In the multiplayer mode, players compete with up to 3 friends, and up to 12 computer-controlled players in a deathmatch game. Online play is only available in the Windows version of the game.

== Plot ==
In 2121, Mega-City One is a dystopian megacity of 800 million people, each holding the potential for criminal activity; to maintain total order, the city employs a law enforcement agency of "Street Judges", who act as police, judge, jury, and executioner. Judge Dredd is the city's most effective law enforcer, respected by all Judges and feared by all crooks. Judge Anderson of the Psi Division has a premonition of a horrible plague that will befall the city. Dredd is instructed to keep an eye out for any leads regarding Anderson's vision.

Later while on patrol, Dredd encounters a pack of feral vampires attacking civilians. After dispatching them, Dredd is informed that an aircraft filled with vampires has crashed into the Nixon penitentiary, disabling all of the automated defenses and sparking a prison riot. Dredd is dispatched to help secure the penitentiary. In the ensuing chaos, the ethereal spirits of the Dark Judges manage to escape from their containment cells. Without any leads to follow up on, Dredd returns to regular patrol while the Psi Division tries to locate the Dark Judges. Dredd stumbles upon a death cult that is in the process of creating physical bodies for the Dark Judges' spirits to inhabit. By the time Dredd manages to fight through the cult, the ritual has already been completed and the Dark Judges are once again roaming the streets of Mega-City One.

Dredd is called to a nearby megamall, where a massive zombie outbreak has taken place. Though it is initially believed that the outbreak is the work of Judge Death, it is later determined that both the vampires and zombies that have been appearing in Mega-City One are humans infected by a genetically engineered retrovirus developed by Dr. Icarus for a pet reanimation business. Dredd is sent to arrest Dr. Icarus, but Dr. Icarus injects himself with a modified version of his virus before seemingly falling to his death. Dr. Icarus' lab then begins to self-destruct, forcing Dredd to flee.

Judge Mortis is seen on a killing spree at the Clooney Hospital. Dredd makes his way through the hospital and helps the patients get to safety before corralling Judge Mortis into a quarantine chamber with disinfectant. Dredd is then informed that Judge Fire has been located at a nearby smokatorium. After activating the smokatorium's fire suppression system, Dredd destroys Judge Fire's physical body, and Judge Fire's spirit is captured by a Psi Division team. Judge Death is then discovered in Resyk, killing most of the workers inside. Dredd confronts Judge Death and manages to destroy his body, but Death flees to the undercity before his spirit can be captured. Dredd gives chase, eventually discovering Judge Fear guarding a portal to Deadworld, the home of the Dark Judges. Dredd dispatches Judge Fear and successfully captures his spirit, before heading through the portal in pursuit of Judge Death.

On Deadworld, Dredd fights through the reanimated remains of Deadworld's inhabitants as well as a small group of death cultists, eventually reaching Judge Death. He possesses Dr. Icarus's mutated body, which was recovered by the death cult for Death's use. Unable to do any damage to Judge Death's new body, Dredd releases a group of Psi Division judges that Death was holding hostage, including Judge Anderson. They use their powers to pull Death's spirit out of Dr. Icarus' body, but before his spirit can be captured, he attempts to possess Judge Anderson. Anderson manages to resist, and traps Judge Death inside her mind.

== Novel ==
Gordon Rennie wrote a Dredd vs. Death novelization, published by Black Flame, as a tie-in to the game (October 2003, ISBN 1-84416-061-0). The novel alters the storyline somewhat in that certain events which in the game happened to Dredd are given to other judges such as Judge Giant and Anderson. Galen DeMarco also plays a prominent role.

== Development ==
Rebellion, who had recently purchased the Judge Dredd and the 2000 AD comic series a year prior announced in February 2001 that they would produce a Judge Dredd title as an Xbox exclusive with a 2002 release window. A year later in January 2002, more information was surfaced by the developer, including the title: Dredd vs. Death. In July 2002, Vivendi Universal Games subsidiary NDA Productions announced they would release the title in Europe. In October 2002, a PlayStation 2 version was announced, with the title being released within 2003. GameCube and Microsoft Windows versions were announced shortly after E3 2002. The game went gold in Europe on October 3, 2003, and was released on the 17th, with the GameCube version releasing the following month. The game would be released under the Sierra Entertainment label instead of NDA.

On January 27, 2004, Rebellion announced that Evolved Games purchased the North American publishing rights to the title, and would release it in March 2004. However, the game's North American release was delayed numerous times by Evolved in order to tie the game into a new DC Comics-published property. In June 2004, Evolved Games announced that the game would be released in March 2005, while on October 27, 2004, BAM! Entertainment was announced as the game's exclusive North American distributor.

== Reception ==
Reception

Aggregate score
Aggregator	Score			
Aggregator	GameCube	PC	PS2	Xbox
Metacritic	56/100	55/100	52/100	57/100

Review scores
Publication	Score			
Publication	GameCube	PC	PS2	Xbox
Edge	5/10	5/10	5/10	5/10
Eurogamer	N/A	3/10	N/A	N/A
Game Informer	N/A	N/A	N/A	6.75/10
GameSpot	5.6/10	5.6/10	5.6/10	5.6/10
IGN	5/10	5/10	5/10	5/10
Nintendo Power	2.5/5	N/A	N/A	N/A
Official U.S. PlayStation Magazine	N/A	N/A	2/5	N/A
Official Xbox Magazine (US)	N/A	N/A	N/A	4.3/10
PC Gamer (US)	N/A	64%	N/A	N/A
Maxim	4/10	4/10	4/10	4/10

The game received "mixed" reviews on all platforms according to the review aggregation website Metacritic.

Some areas of complaints were weak A.I., lackluster graphics, overly bizarre character models, and simplistic gameplay. However, the game was praised for its multiplayer and arcade mode, which contains over a dozen maps and several playable characters and modes, similar to that of TimeSplitters 2. The arcade mode was also noted as being superior compared to the campaign (IGN said it "adds some spice to an otherwise boiled and blanched game"). IGN concluded, "Fans of the fiction will finally appreciate a style that keeps its faith, but will wonder how this game could have done its source material the same sort of disservice the decade old movie did", negatively comparing it to the 1995 film Judge Dredd.

GameSpot were more ambivalent about the game, calling it a "short, simplistic shooter that's not worth even its budget price," and concluding that "It's not embarrassingly bad, but you're better off waiting for your next paycheck and then sinking in the extra cash into any of the much better full-priced shooters readily available on all four platforms." Many game magazine publishers gave early reviews on the game about a year before it was released in the United States.
