= Nano Breaker =

2005 video game

- North American cover art
- Developer: Konami TYO
- Publisher: Konami
- Director: Kenichiro Kato
- Producer: Koji Igarashi
- Artist: Kazuhide Nakazawa
- Composer: Kennosuke Suemura
- Platform: PlayStation 2
- Release: JP: January 27, 2005; NA: February 15, 2005; EU: February 18, 2005; AU: February 25, 2005
- Genres: Action, hack and slash
- Mode: Single-player

Nano Breaker (ナノブレイカー, Nano Bureikā) is an action video game developed and published by Konami for the PlayStation 2 in 2005.

== Gameplay ==
The player controls Jake, a cyborg militant and the protagonist of the game, and explores a large island stage. As Jake, the player controls a plasma blade that can transform into numerous weapons (axe, broadsword, hammer, etc.), generated by the blade during combo attacks. The plasma blade also has the ability to grapple enemies from afar with a blue energy cord. Jake's body is metallic and has wings that can extend from his shoulderblades and allow him to glide. The wings also serve as a "limiter release" for more powerful combos and finishing moves. Within the game world, the player faces the mutated inhabitants of the island, referred to as "Orgamechs". There are many different types of orgamechs, such as humanoids, bugs and dogs. The points system is a counter which tallies the amount of blood spilled after killing an orgamech. When the counter reaches certain amounts of blood, Jake receives extra health and energy as well as increases in his maximum potential level of health and energy.

== Synopsis ==
=== Plot ===
The game is set in 2021, in which the United States has established an island facility called Nanomachine Island to research and develop nanotechnology for implementation in military and civilian life. To achieve this goal, the United States collected the world's foremost scientists, analysts and businessmen and placed them in a secluded community. After 20 years of technological advancement, the island is in chaos. As Jake, the player's goal is to assist the daughter of a brilliant scientist in her attempts to restore order to the island and its people by destroying the main computer which manages the activities of the nanomachines.

=== Characters ===
- Jake Warren "The Genocide Hero": (voiced by Crispin Freeman) Jake is the leader of a group of cyborg militants that fought in a war around seven years before the game begins, before being placed under cryogenic sleep for seven years after he and his squad were accused of killing many innocent civilians during a skirmish. He is woken at the beginning of the story to deal with the Orgamech outbreak on Nanomachine Island. Jake has an average physique and shoulder-length white-blond hair. His body is made of some type of metal and seems entirely mechanical, except his head, the only part of his real body left visible. Jake acquires some special abilities (called Boosters) during the game, such as: Plasma Storm, a wide range energy blast that damages many enemies at once; Speed Up, which increases his speed for a limited time; and Status Boost, which enables Jake to ignore interruptions during combo attacks and reduces damage taken. Jake also has a combo list which can be upgraded with special nanomachine cores acquired in different levels and colors indicating which slots of the combo list they can occupy.
- Keith Spencer: (voiced by Steven Blum) Keith is one of Jake's former squad members and a cyborg militant who committed the murders Jake was accused of. He is one of the main antagonists of the game and has a grudge against Jake for killing him before he became a cyborg. Keith is a large, broad shouldered man with a raspy voice who has a thin strip of white hair running from the front of his forehead to his neck. His body is also more heavily modified than Jake's, including a gatling gun hidden in his arm and long, thin "wings" that extend from his back, which allow some control during aerial combat but not continuous flight. Keith also has a seldom-used "Final Limiter" which changes his appearance dramatically and makes him stronger and faster for an indefinite period of time. He uses this form during his final fight with Jake. This form also allows him to maximize the use of his plasma blade and use an attack which can slice a bridge in half (as seen in one of the game's cutscenes). Keith becomes a playable character after completing Story Mode once, but has all the same abilities as Jake and does not obtain the bridge-slicing move during story mode at any point.
- Michelle Baker: A female scientist with intimate knowledge of the nanomachines. She is dispatched to Nanomachine Island to shut down the main computer. She is the daughter of the scientist who created the nanomachines and is also a skilled hacker who assists Jake in his mission. She has little influence on the game's storyline until she is kidnapped; Jake then tries to rescue her while also fulfilling his main objective.
- General Raymond: The main antagonist of the game, his ultimate goal is to transform the entire world into Orgamechs by taking control of the main computer on Nanomachine Island. General Raymond is a veteran military officer who initially appears to be on Jake's side, but is revealed to've masterminded the harrowing tragedy that befell the utopian habitat and betrays him midway through the story. He employs both Keith and Jake to do his bidding unknowingly, knowing that whether Jake killed Keith or vice versa, one of them would reach the main computer, destroy it, and allow him to take control of its core. Afterwards he would just dispose of whichever one fulfilled his wishes. He is the final boss and takes control of the main computer's core to become an extremely advanced, gold plated Orgamech which is fought in the final stage. He is killed by Jake at the end of this fight.

== Development ==
Nano Breaker was developed and published by Konami and was produced by Koji Igarashi, known for his contributions to the company's Castlevania franchise. Nano Breaker uses a modified version of the Castlevania: Lament of Innocence engine.

== Reception ==
Reception

Aggregate score
Aggregator	Score
Metacritic	51/100

Review scores
Publication	Score
Edge	5/10
Electronic Gaming Monthly	6/10 (Note: Three critics of Electronic Gaming Monthly gave the game each a score of 7.5/10, 6.5/10, and 4/10.)
Eurogamer	3/10
Famitsu	28/40
Game Informer	5/10
GameRevolution	D−
GameSpot	5.5/10
GameSpy	2.5/5
GameZone	6.3/10
IGN	4.5/10
Official U.S. PlayStation Magazine	2.5/5
X-Play	2/5
Detroit Free Press	1/4
Maxim	2/5

The game received "mixed" reviews according to the review aggregation website Metacritic. In Japan, Famitsu gave it a score of all four sevens for a total of 28 out of 40. GamePro said of the game, "No one wins in this tale about man versus machine. Nano Breaker is a brainless, gratuitous gashingfest that means well but just doesn't play well." (Note: GamePro gave the game two 3/5 scores for graphics and sound, 3.5/5 for control, and 2.5/5 for fun factor.)

The game is considered an obscure game noted for its over-the-top usage of blood. GameTrailers rated it as the "bloodiest game you never played".
