= Kollon =

2003 video game

- Japanese PSP box art
- Developer: MagicPot
- Publishers: JP: CyberFront; NA: Conspiracy Entertainment; EU: 505 Games
- Platforms: Arcade, PlayStation Portable
- Release: Arcade: JP: 2003; PSP: JP: December 16, 2004; KO: May 2, 2005; NA: December 13, 2005; EU: March 3, 2006
- Genre: Puzzle
- Modes: Single-player, multiplayer
- Arcade system: Taito G-NET

Kollon (ころん) (titled Ultimate Block Party in the United States and Koloomn in Europe) is a 2003 puzzle video game developed by MagicPot and published by CyberFront for arcades. It was later ported to the PlayStation Portable as a launch title in 2004.

== Gameplay ==
The player must match at least four blocks of the same color to remove them, while new rows of blocks rise from the bottom of the screen.

Kollon is a puzzle video game where the player rotates a two by two section of blocks to match similarly-colored blocks, and blocks can be cleared from the board if at least four blocks of the same color are touching. When blocks are cleared, blocks above them fall down, which may be used to make combos which award more points. As the game progresses, new rows of blocks will push up the current ones, getting faster as the game increases in difficulty. Not clearing enough within a set time limit will force the blocks to the top of the screen, where the player will lose. The speed of new rows will increase as the game is played longer. The game offers several different modes including a multiplayer and arcade mode.

== Development ==
Kollon arcade cabinets were exhibited at the 2004 Tokyo Game Show, alongside videos of a prototype of the PSP port. The PSP version of Kollon was also exhibited at E3 2004. Kollon was released in December 2004 as a launch title for the PSP in Japan. Both western releases of Kollon, the US PSP release Ultimate Block Party and the European Koloomn release by 505 Games adds a Wifi LAN multiplayer mode, which is absent in the Japanese PSP version. The US PSP release of Ultimate Block Party was published by Conspiracy Entertainment.

== Reception ==
Reception

Review scores
Publication	Score
IGN	8/10 (PSP)
Official UK PlayStation 2 Magazine	8/10 (PSP)
Go>Play	70% (PSP)

Several critics compared Kollon to Lumines: Puzzle Fusion, a puzzle game with similar mechanics which was also a PSP launch title. Official UK PlayStation 2 Magazine stated that while a good game, Koloomn isn't "as polished" as Lumines.

IGN gave the PSP version of Ultimate Block Party an overall score of eight out of ten, praising its variety of game modes, its 'complex' and difficult versus mode, and its fast and "hectic" gameplay, further expressing that the game's pacing is "amazing" and achieving combos feels fun and rewarding. IGN further praised Ultimate Block Party's art style, calling it "cute and blindingly colorful". Another critic from IGN reviewed the Japanese PSP version, and while similarly praising the game's art and gameplay, criticized the lack of a multiplayer mode, as well as "lengthy" loading times. IGN called Ultimate Block Party an improvement over Kollon due to the addition of multiplayer and improved load times.

Official UK PlayStation 2 Magazine gave the PSP version of Koloomn an overall score of eight out of ten, calling it "addictive" and "refreshingly different" than other puzzle games, further praising Koloomn as 'innovative' within the "crowded market" of puzzle games.

Go>Play gave the PSP version of Koloomn an overall score of 70%.

== Legacy ==
Games in the Kollon series have been released for the arcade, PSP, and mobile phone (EZweb, Yahoo! Keitai (Yahoo!ケータイ)). A second PSP Kollon game, titled Korokoro Kollon (コロコロころん) was released in Japan on June 22, 2006.

== See also ==
- Tetris
