= Scorpion's Revenge =

1997 film by Daisuke Gotō

- The 2003 DVD Cover for Scorpion's Revenge released by Central Park Media
- Directed by: Daisuke Goto
- Screenplay by: Toshimichi Saeki
- Based on: Female Prisoner Scorpion by Tohru Shinohara
- Produced by: Shinsuke Yamazaki; Masaaki Yokouci; Hideo Sugimoto; Yutaro Kawamura
- Starring: Yoko Saito; Shizuka Ochi
- Cinematography: Makoto Watanabe
- Edited by: Hirohide Abe
- Music by: EISEN
- Production company: Vision Sugimoto
- Distributed by: Pony Canyon (Japan); Central Park Media (North America)
- Release date: April 25, 1997 (Japan)
- Running time: 86 minutes
- Country: Japan
- Language: Japanese

Scorpion's Revenge (also known as Sasori in U.S.A.) is a 1997 Japanese women in prison film directed by Daisuke Goto, and starring Yoko Saito, Shizuka Ochi and Tetta Sugimoto. The film was a Japanese/American co-production and was mostly filmed in Los Angeles, California. The plot of the film centers on a woman framed for the murder of her husband; the plot is similar to that of Double Jeopardy, which was released two years later.

== Plot ==
Nami Matsuhima and her husband Jiro were a Japanese couple living in the United States. Unfortunately, Nami's life changes for the worse, when Jiro is killed by an explosion from a bomb that was planted in his car.

The police believe that Nami is responsible because Jiro had signed a life insurance policy the month before, which granted Nami $1.2 million. She is sent to a women's prison and is assigned to a cell, next to another Japanese woman, Yukiko Kida. Nami learns from Yukiko and other prisoners that the warden likes to rape and torture several of the prisoners that are brought over by Zamira, the warden's favorite.

Meanwhile, Nami's friend and Jiro's former partner, Jimmy Yoshioka tells Nami about Jiro's lawyer career and had made some enemies, which leads Nami to believe she was framed. Then, Yukiko is raped by the warden and Nami decides to avenge her. Nami is brought over to the warden and kills him. She then, knocks out Zamira by slamming her head against the gate and grabs the keys. She, Yukiko and a bunch of other prisoners escape.

However, only Nami and Yukiko managed to fully escape. They are stranded and left to die in the Mexican desert and Nami learns that Yukiko is blind, and later tells Nami that her boyfriend was killed by a gang leader and was also raped and blinded by him. Jimmy eventually finds and helps them. He then tells Nami that all of Jiro's enemies have been killed, which throws them off in their search. Nami decides to help Yukiko exact her revenge. She goes to the church, where the gang leader is getting married and shoots him dead.

Nami later finds out that Jiro had faked his death and confronts Jiro at their home (which is now left for sale). Nami finds out about Jiro's motives and they fight. Jiro escapes and Nami engages in a car chase which ends with Nami and Jiro in the desert. Jiro is about to kill Nami, when a scorpion stings him, which leaves him paralyzed. Nami takes the shotgun and kills him. She leaves his body in his car and set both on fire.

== Cast ==
- Yoko Saito as Nami Matsuhita
- Shizuka Ochi as Yukiko Kida
- Tetta Sugimoto as Jiro Sugimi
- Kirsten Norton as Zamira
- Takanori Kikuchi as Jimmy Yoshioka
- Michael Hegedus as Warden Cooper
- Kimberly Shaolm Valentino as Sandra
- Carol Hoyt as Linda
- Bebra Aza as Liz
- Kevin Crowther as Paul
- Francisco Viana as Dino
- Buddy Daniels as Fuller
- Hank Matt as Anthony
- Kim Delgado as Prosecutor

== Release ==
The film was released direct-to-video on VHS on October 17, 1997. It was licensed in North America by Central Park Media, who released the film under their Asia Pulp Cinema label on VHS on December 28, 1999 and later on DVD with an English dub on September 9, 2003. The English dub was produced by Central Park Media and was recorded at Audioworks Producers Group in New York City.
