= Neuro Hunter =

2005 video game

- Developer: Media Art
- Publishers: UK: Deep Silver; RU: Noviy Disk
- Designer: Vyacheslav Nemiro
- Programmer: Andrey Zuenkov
- Writers: Andery Terekhov; Vyacheslav Nemiro; Sergey Serov; Aleksey Datiy
- Composers: Anatoliy Shuch; Tatiana Nemiro; Alexander Voloshin; Konstantin Galinsky
- Platform: Windows
- Release: UK: August 19, 2005; RU: January 19, 2006
- Genre: Action role-playing game First-person shooter
- Mode: Single player

Neuro Hunter is a cyberpunk-themed first-person shooter/role-playing video game developed by Media Art and published by Deep Silver. It was released on August 19, 2005, only for Microsoft Windows platform. The game was marketed as a mix between Deus Ex, System Shock and Gothic series of video games.

== Storyline ==
The player assumes the role of Hunter, a computer expert who is hired by the Johnston Biotek corporation, referred to as the "Corporation" in the game. Hunter is to repair the network of a mining complex but fails and ends up in a cave world after an explosion. A man called Toadstool finds him and tells him where he is: In an underground world where a computer freak called Hacker has seized power. Left alone by the corporation, Hunter has to find a way back to the surface all by himself. On his quest he meets Kathryn, a mysterious woman, who sometimes helps the player. Hunter faces many dangers and problems; for instance, when he is confronted by sinister figures in an underground prison colony.
