= College Hoops 2K6 =

2005 basketball video game

- Developer: Visual Concepts
- Publisher: 2K
- Platforms: Xbox 360, Xbox, PlayStation 2
- Release: Xbox: NA: November 23, 2005; PlayStation 2: NA: November 30, 2005; Xbox 360: NA: March 7, 2006
- Genre: Sports
- Modes: Single-player, multiplayer

College Hoops 2K6 is an American college basketball video game which was initially released on November 21, 2005 for the Xbox and later released for PlayStation 2 and Xbox 360. It is the first installment of the series to appear on a seventh generation video game console (in this case the Xbox 360). It also marked the first time since the original NCAA College Basketball 2K3 that the series was without an ESPN license. It features former UNC small forward Marvin Williams, along with UNC head coach Roy Williams, on the cover.

== Modes & Features ==
- Over 30 In-Season Tournaments- Over 30 In-Season Tournaments including the Great Alaska Shootout, Preseason NIT, 2K Sports Classic benefiting coaches vs cancer and more.
- Real Coaches- Real coaches including Roy Williams, Tubby Smith, Jim Boeheim, Lute Olson, and more.
- Coach's Clipboard- Improve your zone defense efficiency and exploit opponent's weaknesses by having total control over individual zone placements with zone substitutions.
- Underclassmen Recruiting- Recruit all levels of high school players to create interest in your program that will carry over with the athlete from year to year.
- High School Camps- Visit High School Camps, watch, or play with the top prospects in the country to see how they perform in drills and scrimmages.
- All-New Shot Stick- A new shooting system gives you incredible control when pulling monster dunks, finger rolls, fade-aways, and jumpers with the analog stick.

== Soundtrack ==
- Cybrid - "Selectro"
- Disco D - "6 a.m. Funk, Work That"
- DJ Spooky - "Metaverse"
- Waiting for Evangeline - "System Malfunction"
- Meat Beat Manifesto - "Wild"
- MED - "Whut U In It 4"
- Out Hud - "It's For You"
- Quasimoto - "Rapcats, Pt. 3"
- Romanowski - "Romanowski's Third"

== Development ==
The game was showcased at E3 2005.

== Reception ==
Reception

Aggregate scores
Aggregator	Score
GameRankings	(Xbox) 81.94% (PS2) 77% (X360) 73.19%
Metacritic	(Xbox) 82/100 (PS2) 77/100 (X360) 70/100

Review scores
Publication	Score
AllGame	3.5/5
Game Informer	8/10
GamePro	4/5 (X360) 3/5
GameRevolution	B− (X360) C+
GameSpot	8.3/10 (X360) 7.2/10
GameSpy	4.5/5 (X360) 3/5
GameZone	(Xbox) 8.1/10 (X360) 7.5/10 (PS2) 7.4/10
IGN	(Xbox) 8.3/10 (PS2) 8/10 (X360) 7.4/10
Official U.S. PlayStation Magazine	3/5
Official Xbox Magazine (US)	8/10
The A.V. Club	B+

The game was met with positive to average reception. GameRankings and Metacritic gave it a score of 81.94% and 82 out of 100 for the Xbox version; 77% and 77 out of 100 for the PlayStation 2 version; and 73.19% and 70 out of 100 for the Xbox 360 version.
