= Animaniacs: Lights, Camera, Action! =

2005 video game

- Developer: Warthog Games
- Publisher: Ignition Entertainment
- Platforms: Nintendo DS, Game Boy Advance
- Release: Game Boy Advance: UK: June 24, 2005; Nintendo DS: UK: August 5, 2005
- Genre: Action
- Mode: Single player

Animaniacs: Lights, Camera, Action! is an action game for the Nintendo DS and Game Boy Advance. It was developed by Warthog Games and published by Ignition Entertainment. The game is based on the cartoon series Animaniacs. Since the TV series had ended seven years earlier, and Wakko's Wish being the series finale, this game was the last official appearance of the characters until the 2020 revival. It was also the last game to be developed by Warthog before its discontinuation in 2006. According to Nintendo's database, a NTSC port was scheduled for release on November 14, 2005. It appears on some listings, but no copy or image of it is known to exist, so it was most likely cancelled.

== Synopsis ==
The Animaniacs have caused mayhem and financial damages to Warner Bros. Studios, much to the annoyance of studio president Thaddeus Plotz. Instead of firing them, Plotz assigns the Animaniacs to make three films where he'll use the revenue to fix the studio's financial problems.

== Gameplay ==
The basic gameplay consists of running through the stage in an isometric camera-angle, avoiding enemies, finding keys to unlock doors, and solving puzzles. The director is present throughout each stage, and instructs the player what to do next in order to complete the movie. At the end of most stages a boss can be found that has to be beaten.

The player can change characters by finding a "stage door" and then play a game of "polka dottie." Players cannot die in the game, but have a limited amount of time to finish each stage. Time is symbolized by film rolls. If the player touches an enemy, the game will start over from the place where the player last spoke to the director.

== Reception ==
The game received mostly negative reviews. Aggregator Metacritic gave Nintendo DS version a 39 out of a 100 while Game Boy Advance version got slightly higher, 43 out of 100. GameRankings on the other hand, gave the Nintendo DS version 44.30% and gave Game Boy Advance version a 46.22% rank.
