= Shaman King: Legacy of the Spirits =

2005 video game

- Box art for Soaring Hawk edition
- Developer: Konami Computer Entertainment Japan
- Publisher: Konami Digital Entertainment America
- Designer: Nobuhiro Yamada
- Platform: Game Boy Advance
- Release: NA: February 8, 2005
- Genre: Role-playing
- Mode: Single player

Shaman King: Legacy of the Spirits, Soaring Hawk and Shaman King: Legacy of the Spirits, Sprinting Wolf are role-playing video games based on the Shaman King manga and anime series. The games were released for the Game Boy Advance by Konami on February 8, 2005. Both Soaring Hawk and Sprinting Wolf feature the same story, gameplay, characters and locations. The difference is that each has its own set of spirits so to recruit all spirits the player has to trade them via Game Link Cable between the games.

== Gameplay ==
Shaman King: Legacy of the Spirits is a role-playing video game—the first Shaman King game on the genre. The player controls Yoh Asakura, a young shaman who has the ability to communicate with spirits and along with the samurai spirit Amidamaru will battle other shamans to become the Shaman King. As the game progresses Yoh is sent to different areas of a world map where the player has to fulfill tasks for the inhabitants—that vary from going to some place, talking to other people or collecting items. After the tasks are complete, a new area is unlocked in the world map. As the player walks through the scenario to perform the tasks, a random battle with a spirit or another shaman can happen. In this case, the player can flee the battle if it proves difficult and if it causes too much damage there is a save point that restore all health.

The player can capture the spirits by defeating them in battle or by throwing an item known as mortuary tablet after weakening them. The player uses its spirits to fight on one-on-one turn-based battles that last until a shaman defeats all the opponent's spirits. While the player is allowed to store twenty of these captured spirits with him, only a roster of six spirits is allowed per battle. During a turn, the player can choose to attack, to change the active spirit with another from the roster, or to use an item from the inventory—that can restore health or cure status effect, like sleep or poison, gained in battle. The player aims to reduce the opponent spirit's healths to zero, and for such each spirit has a maximum of six attacks that can be used only 20–30 times per battle, with some special attacks limited to five times. Also, there are different types of attacks associated with elementary properties that can be more or less effective depending on the opponent spirit's type.

After winning a battle, Yoh and the spirits gain experience points, and yen is collected. Earning experience, the spirits level up, increasing their attack power, health, and every five levels they learn new attacks. When Yoh levels up, he gains the ability to command high-leved spirits and to merge them to create new ones. Every ten levels, Yoh can merge more powerful types of spirits, and some of them cannot be acquired otherwise. To acquire all the 177 collectible spirits the player has to merge and beat them, but also to trade spirits between the Soaring Hawk and Sprinting Wolf versions through Game Link Cable.

== Reception ==
Reception

Aggregate scores
Aggregator	Score
GameRankings	58.92% (SH); 59.31% (SW)
Metacritic	59% (SH); 60% (SW)

Review scores
Publication	Score
G4	3/5
GameSpot	6/10
GameZone	6.5/10 (SH); 6.6/10 (SW)
IGN	6/10 (SH); 6.5/10 (SW)
RPGamer	1/5

All reviewers compared Shaman King: Legacy of the Spirits's gameplay to that of Pokémon series; some of them unfavorably. Frank Provo of GameSpot said, "It isn't as comprehensive or glamorous as any of Nintendo's Pokémon games". Justin Leeper of G4 TV, however, said that in comparison to other Pokémon clones it brings new elements that makes it better than most GBA RPGs and help separate it from the other titles like Dragon Warrior Monsters or Robopon.
