= Shaman King: Power of Spirit =

2004 video game

- Developer(s): WinkySoft
- Publisher(s): Konami
- Platform(s): PlayStation 2
- Release: NA: November 9, 2004; PAL: November 25, 2005
- Genre(s): Adventure / Strategy (minor)
- Mode(s): Single player, multiplayer - linking

Shaman King: Power of Spirit is the second Shaman King game released on the PS2, while the first was Shaman King: Funbari Spirits, which was a Japan-exclusive cel-shaded fighter. Power of Spirit was developed for the 4Kids Entertainment dub by WinkySoft and published by Konami, and released only in the U.S. and Europe. Power of Spirit is one of the only "tactical RPG" Shaman King games ever made, aside from the Japan-exclusive strategy games for the Game Boy Color and Game Boy Advance.

== Storyline ==
Shaman King: Power of Spirit starts off when the Shaman Fight begins. The first chapters are mostly centered on the episodes that took place in the anime, but with a bit of a twist here and there, with some new villains joining the ranks. They are known as Force Millennium, and their mission is to find the vessel and acquire as much furyoku for their evil plan as possible; they have their sights set on Meril Inugami, an original character in the game who becomes a part of Yoh's team during their adventures together. Throughout the story, Yoh and his team must stop Force Millennium from awakening an ancient evil as old as time itself, but through this new adventure they will face obstacles and trials to make them stronger and more powerful than ever, in order to save their friend Meril from the clutches of Captain Vineuvall and the Five Sages.

== Information ==
Shaman King: Power of Spirit is a hybrid of a fighting game and a turn-based strategy game. When in battle, strategic elements are featured when the player is to move on a large grid to a certain position. When the player is in front of a specific enemy on the field grid, they can initiate an attack on them. This leads to a "fighting game" segment in which the player and that specific enemy battle. This portion of the game received criticism due to having few combos (resulting in repetitive gameplay) and bloated health bars. The battlefields are simple and square-shaped, with few objects, which led to more criticism. Before the gameplay, cutscenes will take place in which a large amount of dialogue will be covered to reflect a perfect amount of tension before the coming battle. Most of the cutscenes use still drawings and text, but the game also makes use of 3D models and/or voiceovers at times. At some points, it is known that the player will be fighting the spirit of a specific shaman instead of the shaman himself. Despite the added depth from certain special moves and the range of characters, Shaman King: Power of Spirit is generally regarded as mediocre, due to the aforementioned simple, repetitive fighting system, the long cutscenes made up of static images, and an overall lack of polish.

== Playable Characters ==
- Yoh Asakura
- Tao Len (VS. Mode only)
- Horohoro(VS. Mode only)
- Lyserg Dithel(VS. Mode only)
- Silva (VS. Mode only)
- Zeke (VS. Mode only)
- Captain Vineuvall/Heckel/Ruby/Zerumo/Zaua(VS. Mode only)
- Rio (VS. Mode only)
- Faust VIII (VS. Mode only)
- Kanna/Matilda/Marion (VS. Mode only)
- Meril/Masked Meril (VS. Mode only)

== Episodes ==
- The Destiny Star
- Challenger from the North
- Faust VIII
- The Return of Tao Len
- The Mysterious Menace
- Road to the Taos
- To The Finals
- The Dobie Demons
- Lyserg Dithel
- Force Millennium
- Loss
- In Pursuit of Meril
- Rescue
- Zerumo's Trap
- The Masked Messenger
- Marionette
- Spear of Fate
- Zeke's Advice
- Ritual of Resurrection
- Advent of Evil
