= Shaman King: Master of Spirits 2 =

2005 video game

- Developer: Konami
- Publisher: Konami
- Platform: Game Boy Advance
- Release: NA: August 2, 2005; EU: February 17, 2006
- Genres: Adventure, metroidvania
- Mode: Single player

Shaman King: Master of Spirits 2 is the sequel to the Game Boy Advance game Shaman King: Master of Spirits that had been released in 2004. Konami decided to make a sequel to this game, released on August 2, 2005, in the United States and Europe.

== Information ==
Within this sequel, the player will once again go at it as the main character of Shaman King, Yoh Asakura. When it comes to the new unique features within the game, one such is being able to use defeated enemy spirits as allies to assist in the current battle. Konami incorporated a new feature that allows the player to attain more combos, special attacks, and abilities as the player progresses further into the game. Spirits can also be upgraded as well, rendering them more useful to get over in-game traps. When it comes to attaining various other spirits, it is known that some are needed to get through various levels and can be found in random places - usually hidden at times. When it comes to the graphics, it is known that they share exactly the same level of quality as the previous game.

== Reception ==
Reception

Aggregate scores
Aggregator	Score
GameRankings	76.40%
Metacritic	72/100

Review scores
Publication	Score
1Up.com	C
GameSpy	4/5
IGN	8/10
Nintendo Power	6.5/10
