= Shaman King: Master of Spirits =

2004 video game

- Shaman King Master of Spirits cover
- Developer: KCEJ
- Publisher: Konami
- Platform: Game Boy Advance
- Release: NA: November 9, 2004; EU: September 16, 2005
- Genre: Platform-adventure
- Mode: Single player

Shaman King: Master of Spirits is a Metroidvania video game developed by Konami Computer Entertainment Japan and published by Konami. This is the first Shaman King game that was developed for the Game Boy Advance in America. It was developed to accompany the English dub by 4kids Entertainment.

== Story ==
On his quest to advance in the Shaman Tournament and defeat Hao, Yoh and his friends run into a man named Magister, who plans on resurrecting the demon king Mephias. With the help of his friends and their Guardian Ghosts, Yoh must stop Magister at all costs.

== General information ==
Shaman King: Master of Spirits, much like the anime and manga it is based on, is centered on Yoh Asakura and his battles to become the Shaman King.

The story within the game plays like a "Side story", referring to elements within the story of both the manga and anime while not conforming to any particular continuity. In it, Yoh's goal is to stop the Guardian of Demons from being resurrected by a gang of rogue shaman.

The game itself, while not having fatal flaws, does have its critics in response to its simplicity and overuse of map exploration, a surprising lack and simplicity in the move set for Yoh and the lack of health pickups in the areas (Health can only be recovered by spending money to buy health items, finding/receiving them through spirit ability or making use of spirits with healing potential – Tamegoroh, Mash and the Spirit of Fire).
