= List of Shaman King chapters =

Two editions of the first tankōbon volume cover, the first one (left) released by Shueisha on December 3, 1998, and the second one by Kodansha on June 17, 2020.

The chapters of the manga series Shaman King were written and illustrated by Hiroyuki Takei. They were serialized in Shueisha's Weekly Shōnen Jump from 1998 to 2004. The series follows the story of Yoh Asakura, a shaman who enters into a worldwide tournament of shamans in which the winner would become the savior of the world.

The 285 chapters, identified as "Reincarnations", were collected into 32 tankōbon volumes by Shueisha. The first volume was published on December 3, 1998, and volume 32 on January 5, 2005. The first 31 volumes were published once the serialization ended, but the publishing of volume 32 (meant to be published on December 3, 2004) was delayed as Shueisha reported they would only publish it if they receive evidence of demand from approximately 50,000 people.

During Jump Festa 2008, Shueisha announced a kanzenban reprint of the entire series. The series is called Shaman King Kanzen-Ban, or Perfect Edition. This release reprinted the entire series in 27 volumes, complete with new, clear image overlays on the covers, and concluding with an alternative ending. Without the original chapter 285, the kanzenban has sixteen additional chapters and 300 chapters in total. The first volume was published on March 3, 2008, and volume 27 was published on April 3, 2009.

Shaman King was previously licensed in North America by Viz Media for an English-language adaptation, with some chapters initially serialized in its Shonen Jump magazine. The series first appeared in Shonen Jump's third issue from 2003, and last in its September 2007 issue. Viz Media published the original 32 Shaman King volumes: the first was published on September 3, 2003, and the last on January 4, 2011. On July 21, 2020, Kodansha USA announced that they held the rights to Shaman King in English, and they would release all 35 volumes via Comixology and Amazon Kindle Store in July of that year, however it was delayed to October 6 of the same year. Kodansha USA also announced that they would release the series physically in twelve three-in-one omnibus editions. The first volume was published on March 23, 2021, while the last was released on March 7, 2023.

== Volume list ==
No.	Title	Original release date	English release date
1	A Shaman in Tokyo; The Boy Who Dances with Ghosts (Yūrei to odoru otoko) (幽霊と踊る男)	December 3, 1998; 978-4-08-872644-1	September 3, 2003; 978-1-56931-902-4
Reincarnation 001. "The Boy Who Dances with Ghosts" (幽霊と踊る男, "Yūrei to odoru otoko"); Reincarnation 002. "The Waiting Samurai" (待つ侍, "Matsu samurai"); Reincarnation 003. "The Unfinished Billboard" (未看板, "Mi kanban"); Reincarnation 004. "Soul Boxing" (ソウル・ボクシング!, "Sōru Bokushingu"); Reincarnation 005. "Samurai Bodyguard" (侍ボディーガード, "Samurai Bodīgādo"); Reincarnation 006. "Another Shaman" (もう一人のシャーマン, "Mō hitori no Shāman"); Reincarnation 007. "Shaman vs. Shaman" ("Shaman×Shaman"); Reincarnation 008. "100% Integration" (憑依100, "Hyōi hyaku"); Special Info! "Ryu's Companions on His Search for the 'Happy Place'!"
When Manta Oyamada, a middle-school student from Tokyo finds a shaman, Yoh Asakura, playing with ghosts in a graveyard, he hopes to learn more about him. However, Manta is attacked by a gang commanded by "Wooden Sword" Ryu and is saved by Yoh after he merges his soul with the spirit of an ancient samurai named Amidamaru. Noting Amidamaru's strength, Yoh gives him his original sword, Harusame, so that Amidamaru accepts his request to become his partner. However, as they try to find more allies, they only attract the attention of the shaman Ren Tao, whose current partner is Bason, a Chinese warrior. When Yoh refuses to allow Ren to take Amidamaru to aid him in becoming the "Shaman King", the two young shamans engage in a fight against each other. Both shamans manage to use 100% of their spirits' powers, but Yoh wins the fight.
2	Kung-Fu Master; Oshama na shāman (おシャマなシャーマン)	March 4, 1999; 978-4-08-872685-4	January 21, 2004; 978-1-59116-182-0
Reincarnation 009. "The Shaman King" (シャーマンキング, "Shāman Kingu"); Reincarnation 010. "Shaman Ambition" (おシャマなシャーマン, "Oshama na Shāman"); Reincarnation 011. "The Shaman Life" (シャーマンライフ, "Shāman Raifu"); Reincarnation 012. "Kung-Fu Master" (カンフーマスター, "Kanfū Masutā"); Reincarnation 013. "The Corpse Puppet" (屍人形, "Shikabane ningyō"); Reincarnation 014. "Run, Manta, Run" (走れまん太, "Hashire Manta"); Reincarnation 015. "Fists of Rage" (パイロン怒りの一発, "Pairon ikari no ippatsu"); Reincarnation 016. "Raising the Dead" (クチヨセ, "Kuchiyose"); Reincarnation 017. "Pyron's Path to Dao Dan Do" (パイロン導弾道への道, "Pairon DaoDanDō e no michi")
As Yoh recovers from his previous fight, he remembers that the Shaman Kings were saviors from the world who merged with the "Great Spirit." When he wakes up, Yoh is greeted by his fiancée, an itako named Anna Kyoyama, who has come to train him to make him win the upcoming Shaman Fight tournament and become Shaman King. As he endures Anna's brutal regimen, Yoh is confronted by Jun Tao, Ren's older sister, and her jiangshi, a former kung fu movie star named Lee Pyron. Having no weapons that Amidamaru is able to use, Yoh is overpowered by Pyron until Manta gives him Ryu's bokken. However, freeing Pyron from Jun's spell causes Pyron to go berserk when he realizes he was murdered by the Tao family and attacks Jun. To stop Bailong, Anna summons the spirit from Bailong's teacher, Shamon, to merge it with Yoh, who manages to defeat Pyron. After recovering his senses, Pyron decides to stay with Jun, but without having his mind controlled.
3	The Lizard Man; Kaimaku o tsugeru hoshi (開幕を告げる星)	April 30, 1999; 978-4-08-872714-1	May 19, 2004; 978-1-59116-252-0
Reincarnation 018. "Happy Place Trek" (ベスト プレイストレッカー); Reincarnation 019. "The 600-Year Curse" (因縁の600年, "Innen no 600 nen"); Reincarnation 020. "Tokagero's Assault" (強襲トカゲロウ, "Kyōshū Tokagerō"); Reincarnation 021. "Spring Rain" (春に降る雨, "Haru ni furu ame"); Reincarnation 022. "Our Ryu" (オレたちの竜さん, "Oretachi no Ryū-san"); Reincarnation 023. "Tokagero Blues" (トカゲロウブルース, "Tokagerō Burūsu"); Reincarnation 024. "The Integral Tokagero" (憑依合体トカゲロウ, "Hyōi gattai Tokagerō"); Reincarnation 025. "The Dragon's Gratitude" (竜の恩返し, "Ryū no ongaeshi"); Reincarnation 026. "The Harbinger Stars" (開幕を告げる星, "Kaimaku o tsugeru hoshi")
When the spirit of a bandit named Tokagero possesses Ryu, he steals Harusame and takes Manta hostage in order to get revenge on Amidamaru, who killed Tokagero long ago. Upon arriving at Yoh and Anna's house, he confronts Amidamaru, who decides to destroy Harusame to protect his new friends despite the fact that his friend Mosuke had originally forged the sword for Amidamaru. When Ryu's body collapses from the strain of being possessed, Yoh allows Tokagero to possess him in order to save Ryu. Unable to kill Yoh as his trust reminds Tokagero of how his mother once trusted him, Tokagero spares Yoh and flees. The next day, Ryu apologizes to Yoh and Amidamaru for what he did, and agrees to be possessed by Mosuke when Anna summons him to fix Harusame.
4	The Over Soul (Aitsu no Tōtemu Pōru) (あいつのトーテムポール)	August 4, 1999; 978-4-08-872750-9	September 7, 2004; 978-1-59116-253-7
Reincarnation 027. "The New Battle" (新たなる闘い, "Aratanaru tatakai"); Reincarnation 028. "Silva Style" (シルバ·スタイル, "Shiruba Sutairu"); Reincarnation 029. "Over Soul"; Reincarnation 030. "Silva's Totem Pole" (あいつのトーテムポール, "Aitsu no Tōtemu Pōru"); Reincarnation 031. "The Oracle Pager" (ゲット ア オラクルベル, "Getto a orakuru beru"); Reincarnation 032. "The Way of the Patch" (パッチの教え, "Patchi no oshie"); Reincarnation 033. "Horohoro" (ホロホロ); Reincarnation 034. "The Powers of Kororo" (コロロの力, "Kororo no chikara"); Reincarnation 035. "Horohoro's Dream" (夢がホロホロ, "Yume ga Horohoro")
To qualify for the Shaman Fight, Yoh is tested by Silva, a member from the Patch Tribe who oversees the Shaman Fight. However, Yoh is unable to hit Silva, who uses his spiritual energy to combine his various animal spirits to combine with objects to create weapons in a technique named Over Soul. When Yoh manages to create an Over Soul by merging Amidamaru with the Harusame, he lands a hit on Silva and qualifies for the tournament. Yoh is soon forced to face his first opponent, an Ainu shaman Horohoro, who channels his spirit, a Koro-pok-guru named Kororo, with his snowboard to make ice attacks, and dreams of becoming Shaman King in order to plant a vast field of Butterbur for the Koro-pok-guru.
5	The Abominable Dr. Faust; Yō ni tsuite (葉について)	October 4, 1999; 978-4-08-872776-9	December 31, 2004; 978-1-59116-254-4
Reincarnation 036. "Great Ghost, Great Sword" (強い刀強い霊, "Tsuyoi katana tsuyoi rei"); Reincarnation 037. "Decision" (決着, "Ketchaku"); Reincarnation 038. "A Hot Bath and a Starry Sky" (風呂と星空, "Furo to hoshizora"); Reincarnation 039. "Backbone" (骨のある奴, "Hone no aru Yatsu"); Reincarnation 040. "Spill Your Guts" (腹を割って話そう, "Hara o watte hanasō"); Reincarnation 041. "Natural Bone Killers"; Reincarnation 042. "The Atrocity Exhibition" (挑発医師, "Chōhatsu ishi"); Reincarnation 043. "Regarding Yoh" (葉について, "Yō ni tsuite"); Reincarnation 044. "The Pale Lover" (白い恋人, "Shiroi koibito"); Bonus: Funbari Stories – Tales of Funbari Hill
Yoh is able to counterattack all of Horohoro's attacks, winning the fight when Horohoro exhausts his furyoku. The opponents become friends afterward, knowing that Horohoro can still continue fighting in the tournament. Meanwhile, Silva discovers that Yoh's next opponent is Faust VIII, but is unable to convince Anna to make Yoh forfeit the next fight. At a cemetery, Yoh meets Faust, who wants to become the Shaman King to revive his wife Eliza. When Faust attacks Manta out of morbid curiosity regarding Manta's stature, an enraged Yoh is forced to fight off Faust's skeletons. Exhausted from wasting furyoku from fighting the skeletons, Yoh is quickly surpassed by Faust's true Over Soul – a phantom Eliza formed from her bones.
6	Road Trip to Izumo; Otoko futari Izumo tabi (男二人出雲旅)	December 2, 1999; 978-4-08-872799-8	May 4, 2005; 978-1-59116-788-4
Reincarnation 045. "Faust Love" (ファウスト·ラブ, "Fausuto Rabu"); Reincarnation 046. "A Form of Courage" (そんな勇気, "Sonna yūki"); Reincarnation 047. "June Goodbyes" (6月の別れ, "6 Getsu no wakare"); Reincarnation 048. "Road Trip to Izumo" (男二人出雲旅, "Otoko futari Izumo tabi"); Reincarnation 049. "The "Happy Place" Doctrine" (ベストプレイス論, "Besuto Pureisu ron"); Reincarnation 050. "Hell's Belly" (たま地獄, "Tama jigoku"); Reincarnation 051. "Yo" (よう, "Yō"); Reincarnation 052. "Progress" (進化, "Shinka"); Reincarnation 053. "Two Tough Ghosts" (2人のビッグソウル, "Futari no Biggu Sōru"); Bonus: Kokkuri Angel Cupid Tamao
When Yoh's Over Soul disappears, he loses the fight against Faust. When Manta finds Yoh in the hospital, Yoh breaks off their friendship because of what occurred during the fight and leaves for Izumo with Anna and Amidamaru to consult his grandfather Yohmei on how to become strong enough to beat his next opponent, Ren. At Yohmei's suggestion, Yoh enters the Yomi Cave, where he must walk for ten days in the darkness. Meanwhile, Manta finds Ryu and the two set off to find Yoh. When they arrive in Izumo, they are confronted by an Asakura disciple, Tamao Tamamura, and her spirits, Ponchi and Conchi, when Tamao's divinations suggested that Manta and Ryu are threats to Yoh. However, Anna stops her and reveals that Ponchi and Conchi foiled the predictions, before taking them to meet Yoh. When Yoh finally emerges from the Yomi Cave, his Over Soul has become stronger.
7	Clash at Mata Cemetery; Sōru Mata reien (ソウル摩多霊園)	February 2, 2000; 978-4-08-872825-4	September 6, 2005; 978-1-59116-996-3
Reincarnation 054. "Slogan" (スローガン, "Surōgan"); Reincarnation 055. "A Grave Reunion" (再会墓苑, "Saikai boen"); Reincarnation 056. "Slacker" (ユルい奴, "Yurui yatsu"); Reincarnation 057. "Clash at Mata Cemetery" (ソウル摩多霊園, "Sōru Mata reien"); Reincarnation 058. "Display of Power" (巫力と霊力, "Furyoku to Reiryoku"); Reincarnation 059. "Too Much Work" (無理しない, "Muri shinai"); Reincarnation 060. "How?" (なぜ, "Naze"); Reincarnation 061. "Before the Opening Ceremony" (開会式前, "Kaikai shiki mae"); Reincarnation 062. "Ren's Past" (蓮について, "Ren ni tsuite"); Bonus: Funbari Hill Stories 2000; Bonus: Kokkuri Angel Cupid Tamao
Yoh returns to Tokyo for his third fight from the Shaman Fight, where he battles against Ren. Though Ren is a ferocious opponent after merging Bason with his kwan dao to form an Over Soul, his attacks are ineffective against Yoh's ability to use Amidamaru's fighting experience. When Yoh takes the upper hand, Ren expands his Over Soul to overpower Yoh, whose composure allows him to avoid all of Ren's attacks despite being weakened by every hit. Ren's anger causes him to exhaust his furyoku, finally presenting Yoh an opportunity to strike back. Meanwhile, Jun meets her father, Yúan Tao, and tells him Ren will lose.
8	The Road to the Tao Stronghold; Taoke e no michi (道(タオ)家(け)への道(みち))	April 4, 2000; 978-4-08-872848-3	January 3, 2006; 978-1-4215-0198-7
Reincarnation 063. "I Don't Overreach" (無理じゃない, "Muri ja nai"); Reincarnation 064. "Decision" (開会式へ, "Kaikai shiki e"); Reincarnation 065. "Night in the Flame" (炎の夜, "Honō no yoru"); Reincarnation 066. "Sutras at Sunset" (夕焼けの経, "Yūyake no uta"); Reincarnation 067. "Wandering Blue Spirit" (さまよえる蒼い霊魂, "Samayoeru aoi reikon"); Reincarnation 068. "The Road to the Tao Stronghold" (道(タオ)家(け)への道(みち), "Taoke e no michi"); Reincarnation 069. "Against Yúan" (対 円, "Tai En"); Reincarnation 070. "Believe"; Reincarnation 071. "A Tale of Two Men --Our Killer Moves--" (男二人〜オレ達の必殺技〜, "Otoko futari oretachi no hissatsu waza"); Bonus: Kokkuri Angel Cupid Tamao
Yoh and Ren's battle concludes when their Over Souls fade at the same time, allowing both Ren and Yoh pass the preliminary rounds of the Shaman Fight. After a party at the inn, Ren leaves for China to confront his father and free himself of his family's legacy. While returning from a shop, Yoh and Tamao are attacked by two shamans known as the BoZ brothers who attempt to kill Yoh, but are defeated by Ryu, who has become a shaman with Tokagero as his partner. When Bason arrives at Yoh's house and reveals that Ren has been defeated and tortured by his father, Yoh, Horohoro, Ryu, and Manta leave for China to rescue Ren. When they enter the Tao's castle, Horohoro and Ryu work to defeat the five jiangshi guardians who attack them while Yoh goes ahead to find Ren and Jun.
9	Voyage of the Shaman; Shāman no tabi e (シャーマンの旅へ)	June 2, 2000; 978-4-08-872872-8	May 2, 2006; 978-1-4215-0676-0
Reincarnation 072. "A Tale of Two Men -- Our Teamwork" (男二人〜オレ達のコンビネーシヨン〜, "Otoko futari oretachi no Konbinēshiyon"); Reincarnation 073. "Wrath of the Dao-shi Maiden" (蘇る娘娘道士, "Yomigaeru nyan nyan Dōshi"); Reincarnation 074. "Tao Yúan: The Immortal Secret" (何故不死身道円, "Naze fujimi tō En"); Reincarnation 075. "Over Soul: Dà Dào Wáng" (オーバーソウル大道王, "Ōbā Sōru daidō ō"); Reincarnation 076. "The End of the Tao" (道の終焉, "Tao no shūen"); Reincarnation 077. "Voyage of the Shaman" (シャーマンの旅へ, "Shāman no tabi e"); Reincarnation 078. "The Future King" (未来王を名乗る, "Mirai ō o na noru"); Reincarnation 079. "Patch Airlines" (パッチエアライン, "Patchi Earain"); Reincarnation 080. "Sky High" (スカイ·ハイ, "Sukai Hai"); Bonus: 3000 Leagues to Funbari Hill
Yoh rescues Ren and Jun, but Ren won't leave until he has defeated his father. While Horohoro and Ryu have been beaten by the last of the jiang-shi warriors, the corpse of the reanimated Shamon, Lee Pyron manages to defeat his former mentor and allow Ren to advance. To test if his son was right to trust others, Yúan uses his strongest Over Soul. He is forced to concede defeat when Ren overcomes him and Ren's family persuade him to accept Ren's choices. When Yoh and his friends return to Tokyo, the Patch Tribe announces that all the participants of the Shaman Tournament will be taken to America by plane for the next round. Before setting off, Yoh, Ryu, Horohoro, and Ren are attacked by a teenager named Hao who uses the giant Spirit of Fire. When the plane is 1,200 km near to the village, all the participants are dropped from the plane to find the Patch Village by themselves.
10	The Song of Doom; Horobi no denshō ka (滅びの伝承歌)	September 4, 2000; 978-4-08-873010-3	September 5, 2006; 978-1-4215-0677-7
Reincarnation 081. "Route 66 Turbo" (ルート66ターボ, "Rūto 66 Tābo"); Reincarnation 082. "The Song of Doom – 500-Year-Old Memories" (滅びの伝承歌-500年の記憶, "Horobi no denshō ka – 500 nen no kioku"); Reincarnation 083. "The Destroyer Stands Waiting" (滅ぼせし者は未来に, "Horobose shi mono wa mirai ni"); Reincarnation 084. "Lilirara's Fate" (リリララの死, "Ririrara no shi"); Reincarnation 085. "The Flames of Ambition" (野望の炎, "Yabō no honō"); Reincarnation 086. "Dowsing Revolution" (ダウジングレボリューション, "Daujingu Reboryūshon"); Reincarnation 087. "Lyserg the Avenger" (リゼルグ リベンジャー, "Rizerugu Ribenjā"); Reincarnation 088. "Memories of Big Ben" (郷愁のビッグベン, "Kyōshū no Biggu Ben"); Reincarnation 089. "Family Resemblance" (ハオの面影を持つ者, "Hao no omokage o motsu mono"); Bonus: Funbari Stories – Four-Leaf Clover
While searching for the location of the Patch Village, Yoh's group tries asking Lilirara, a member of the Seminoa tribe. When she refuses, she reveals how the Patch tribe massacred her ancestors and attacks them with her ancestors' spirits. As they feel the deaths of the Seminoa, Yoh's group learns that the murderer responsible was Hao five hundred years ago. After Lilirara relents and reveals what she knows about the Patch, she is killed by Hao. As Yoh's group moves on, they meet Lyserg Diethel, a boy who wants to join their group – but only if they are strong. Though he injures Horohoro and Ren with his Over Soul, Lyserg is defeated by Yoh. At the hospital, Lyserg apologizes to the group, confessing that as his parents were killed by Hao and that he wanted strong comrades to take revenge. Hoping to temper Lyserg's hatred, Yoh's group accepts him as their new companion.
11	Blood and Pompadours; Chi to rīzento (血とリーゼント)	November 2, 2000; 978-4-08-873038-7	January 2, 2007; 978-1-4215-0678-4
Reincarnation 090. "Ominous Stars" (星からの悪い知らせ, "Hoshi kara no warui shirase"); Reincarnation 091. "When the Pieces Come Together" (歯車のかみあう時, "Haguruma no kamiau toki"); Reincarnation 092. "Horohoro's Stirring Tale – Week One" (ホロホロ物語 第一週, "Horohoro monogatari dai ichi shū"); Reincarnation 093. "Horohoro's Stirring Tale – Week Two" (ホロホロ物語 第ニ週, "Horohoro monogatari dai ni shū"); Reincarnation 094. "Horohoro's Stirring Tale – Week Three" (ホロホロ物語 第三週, "Horohoro monogatari dai san shū"); Reincarnation 095. "Feeling Mesa Verdede – 5 vs. 5" (フィーリング メサ·ヴェルデデ 5vs5, "Fīringu Mesa Verudede 5 vs 5"); Reincarnation 096. "Blood and Pompadour" (血とリーゼント, "Chi to Rīzento"); Reincarnation 097. "Enter the Ultra-Pompadour" (ウルトラリーゼントにヨロシク, "Urutora Rīzento ni yoroshiku"); Reincarnation 098. "The Smell of Sadness" (悲しみキネテジー, "Kanashimi kinetejī"); Bonus: Song of Funbari Hill "Gomokuzushi Bowl Tonight"
In Japan, Yohmei orders Anna to deliver a book containing Hao's spells to Yoh in order to help him defeat Hao, who is in fact the reincarnation from the founder of the Asakura family. When the seal on the book is broken and its two demon guardians are freed, Anna defeats and takes control of them. In America, Horohoro is separated from his friends and injured. To thank Bluebell Bloch, the park ranger who saved him, he pacifies her polar bear, who has attacked all who got close to him. When the bear is killed by poachers soon after, Horohoro is angered by the poachers' wastefulness but he spares them before reuniting his with friends. Yoh's group goes to investigate a ruin which may be related to the Patch Village, but find five of Hao's henchmen who want to test Yoh. After Boris Tepes Dracula attacks Lyserg, Lyserg falls under his control and attacks Yoh.
12	The Wrath of Angels; Okami kōrin (おかみ降臨)	December 22, 2000; 978-4-08-873063-9	May 1, 2007; 978-1-4215-1100-9
Reincarnation 099. "Legend of the Impaler" (串刺し伝説, "Kushizashi densetsu"); Reincarnation 100. "Spirit Ally Pandemonium" (持霊百鬼夜行, "Ji rei hyakkiyakō"); Reincarnation 101. "Blazing Tenacity" (メラ根性, "Mera konjō"); Reincarnation 102. "Even More Blazing Tenacity" (メラメラ根性, "Meramera konjō"); Reincarnation 103. "Guns of the Angels" (天使のピストル, "Tenshi no Pisutoru"); Reincarnation 104. "Smiling Judgement" (ほほえみジャッジメント, "Hohoemi Jajjimento"); Reincarnation 105. "The Wrath of the Angels" (おかみ降臨, "Okami kōrin"); Reincarnation 106. "The Bride of Asakura" (麻倉の嫁, "Asakura no yome"); Reincarnation 107. "Bill Pays His Debt" (ビルの恩返し, "Biru no ongaeshi")
After Boris reveals that his spirit Blamaro is possessing Lyserg, Boris makes his spirit possess Yoh, which fails when Amidamaru convinces Blamaro to stop attacking them. Using the results from his training with Yohmei, Ryu creates an Over Soul of Yamata no Orochi that defeats Boris. When Yoh tries to ask Boris about Hao, Boris is killed by Marco, a member from the X-Laws, a group created to kill Hao and use Archangels for their Over Souls. When Hao's follower, Big Guy Bill Burton, attempts to attack Yoh, the X-Laws nearly kill him, stopped only by Yoh's intervention and criticism of their extreme and violent actions. In response, Marco turns on Yoh, but stops short of attacking and leaves. As Yoh's group walks through the ruins with Bill, Bill tells them to leave him and explains how to enter the Patch Village.
13	The Return of Faust; L to F no yukue (LとFの行方)	March 2, 2001; 978-4-08-873085-1	September 4, 2007; 978-1-4215-1101-6
Reincarnation 108. "5.6 Billions Years of Memories" (56億年の記億, "56 oku nen no kioku"); Reincarnation 109. "The Competitors' Village" (選手村Days, "Senshu mura Days"); Reincarnation 110. "The Teams Established" (成立マイチーム, "Seiritsu Mai chīmu"); Reincarnation 111. "The Return of Faust" (LとFの行方, "L to F no yukue"); Reincarnation 112. "In Tokyo" (イン トーキョー, "In Tōkyō"); Reincarnation 113. "Fights" (ファイッ, "Fai"); Reincarnation 114. "Jaguar" (黒いジャガー, "Kuroi Jagā"); Reincarnation 115. "Man and Tecolote" (男トペヨーテ, "Otoko to Peyōte"); Reincarnation 116. "Chocolove's Christmas" (チョコラブのクリスマス, "Chokorabu no Kurisumasu"); Bonus: Ponchi and Conchi; Special Bonus: Tales of Funbari Hill – Rokujizo Night
As they leave the ruins, Yoh's group suffer from hallucinations and wake up in the Patch Village, which surrounds the Great Spirit. While Lyserg suddenly disappears, Yoh finds Anna in a shop, having come along with Manta and Tamao. The group also meets Chocolove, a comedian who wants to join them as the fights from the tournaments will now be with teams of three participants. As such, Ren chooses Horohoro and Chocolove as his teammates. Meanwhile, Manta finds Faust VIII, whose request to join Yoh's team is accepted as they know he is not evil. Two months later, the Shaman Fight continues, and the first fight is between Team "The Ren" (Ren, Horohoro and Chocolove) against "Tsuchigumi" (Team Earth), composed of the BoZ Brothers and Peyote, who are in fact henchmen of Hao. Chocolove proves his mettle by defeating the BoZ Brothers with his Over Soul, formed from claws and his jaguar spirit Mic, but is overpowered when he refuses to kill them after Peyote possesses the brothers with his spirits.
14	The Tortured Princess; Gōmon hime namaiki aian meiden (拷問姫〜なまいきアイアンメイデン〜)	June 4, 2001; 978-4-08-873125-4	January 1, 2008; 978-1-4215-1475-8
Reincarnation 117. "His Name was Orona" (じじいの名はオロナ, "Jijī no na wa Orona"); Reincarnation 118. "Winds of Laughter" (笑いの風, "Warai no kaze"); Reincarnation 119. "Motto #2" (スローガン2, "Surōgan 2"); Reincarnation 120. "From Inn to Waiting Room" (控え室は元·旅館, "Hikaeshitsu wa moto ryokan"); Reincarnation 121. "Justice X" (正義X, "Seigi X"); Reincarnation 122. "A-Nile-lation" (んなことナイルズ, "Nna koto Nairuzu"); Reincarnation 123. "Crime and Punishment" (罪とX, "Tsumi to X"); Reincarnation 124. "Holy Girl" (法☆リィ ガール, "Hō☆Ri Gāru"); Reincarnation 125. "The Tortured Princess: Cheeky Iron Maiden" (拷問姫〜なまいきアイアンメイデン〜, "Gōmon hime namaiki Aian Meiden"); Bonus: Tales of Funbari Hill: Secrets of the Star Festival
After remembering his life as a criminal and how he met his shaman teacher, Chocolove creates a wind blow to make Peyote's spirits start laughing to the point they are unable to fight. Ren finishes Peyote, and Team The Ren wins the first fight. In the following match, Team Niles faces X-I, one of the teams from the X-Laws, which now includes Lyserg. Although Lyserg almost kills his opponent, Anatel Pokki, his doubts about killing breaks his Over Soul, forcing the X-Laws' leader, Iron Maiden Jeanne to step in. Using her god-class spirit Shamash, she annihilates the team in an instant.
15	Northern Pride; Kita Puraido (北プライド)	July 4, 2001; 978-4-08-873134-6	March 4, 2008; 978-1-4215-1657-8
Reincarnation 126. "Stand Up, Team Funbari Hot Springs" (ふんばれふんばり温泉チーム, "Funbare Funbari onsen Chīmu"); Reincarnation 127. "Northern Pride" (北プライド, "Kita Puraido"); Reincarnation 128. "Amidamaru's Album" (アルバム阿弥陀丸, "Arubamu Amidamaru"); Reincarnation 129. "I'll Go Anywhere with You" (あなたとならどこまでも, "Anata to nara doko made mo"); Reincarnation 130. "Faust's Album" (ファウストアルバム, "Fausuto Arubamu"); Reincarnation 131. "Bedeviled" (奥様は悪魔, "Okusama wa akuma"); Reincarnation 132. "The Splendor of Ryu" (竜の華, "Ryū no hana"); Reincarnation 133. "The Power of Yoh" (葉力, "Yō ryoku"); Reincarnation 134. "Another Go: Giant Halo Blade" (もうひとふんばり大後光刃, "Mō hito Funbari Daigokōjin")
For their first match, Team Funbari Onsen (composed of Yoh, Ryu and Faust) faces the Icemen, a team of shaman from the northern parts of Europe. Team Funbari Onsen's composed attitude towards the fight offends the Icemen's sense of pride, even more so when Yoh, Faust, and Ryu fail to be insulted and soon demonstrate the overwhelming results of their training with Anna's direction and Hao's spellbook, the Cho Senji Ryakketsu. To acknowledge their efforts, Yoh takes the Icemen on by himself and defeats them all with his Spirit of Sword Over Soul.
16	Grandchild; Mago (孫)	October 4, 2001; 978-4-08-873168-1	May 6, 2008; 978-1-4215-1658-5
Reincarnation 135. "Ren's Point" (連突, "Ren totsu"); Reincarnation 136. "Paradise" (楽園, "Rakuen"); Reincarnation 137. "Burning Angel" (炎上エンジェル, "Enjō enjeru"); Reincarnation 138. "Trust No One" (正義に一番必要なもの, "Seigi ni ichiban hitsuyō na mono"); Reincarnation 139. "Eternal Maiden" (永遠メイデン, "Eien meiden"); Reincarnation 140. "Logic" (すじ, "Suji"); Reincarnation 141. "He's My..." (あいつはオイラの, "Aitsu wa oira no"); Reincarnation 142. "Oh, Brother!!" (ブラザーよ, "Burazā yo"); Reincarnation 143. "Grandchild" (孫, "Mago")
Yoh visits Lyserg, who apologizes for leaving Yoh after he helped Lyserg on his journey. When Jeanne requests that Yoh join the X-Laws, he turns her down and leaves. During a match between the X-Laws' X-III and Hao's own team, Hoshigumi, Hao confronts them alone and easily outmatches them. When X-III sets off a grenade to consume all the oxygen in the arena, Hao reveals that the Spirit of Fire is not limited by a lack of oxygen because of Hao can manipulate all five elements. The souls of X-III are consumed by the Spirit of Fire and Hoshi-gumi is declared the winner. When Yoh's friends learn that Hao's surname is Asakura, Yoh confesses that Hao is the reincarnation of the original Hao and his twin brother and reveals his family's history with Hao. Because Yoh is Hao's other half, Yohmei has trained Yoh specifically to defeat Hao.
17	The Shamanic Oracle; Fumon Tonkō (巫門遁甲)	December 24, 2001; 978-4-08-873216-9	July 1, 2008; 978-1-4215-1659-2
Reincarnation 144. "Initiation" (伝授許可権, "Denju kyoka ken"); Reincarnation 145. "Mikihisa Typhoon" (幹久タイフーン, "Mikihisa Taifūn"); Reincarnation 146. "Warlord" (スーパー武将, "Sūpā bushō"); Reincarnation 147. "Ascetic" (修験, "Shugen"); Reincarnation 148. "Barbeque Party" (B·B·Qパーティー, "B B Q Pātī"); Reincarnation 149. "Death Clash" (Die☆激突, "Die gekitotsu"); Reincarnation 150. "The Shamanic Oracle" (巫門遁甲, "Fumon Tonkō"); Reincarnation 151. "Farewell Forever" (永遠にサヨナラ, "Eien ni sayonara"); Reincarnation 152. "Secret Mana Value" (巫力値シークレット, "Furyokuchi Shīkuretto")
Yoh's father, Mikihisa Asakura, meets Ren's team and decides to train them. When Ren refuses the offer, he fights Mikihisa; despite improving his Over Soul, he is unable to defeat Mikihisa. While they recover from the fight, two Patch Officials, Nichrom and Magna, direct Hao's followers to attack Ren and Mikihisa's teams, forcing Mikihisa to leave to defend his teammates, a pair of children named Redseb and Seyram Munzer. When the children are confronted by the Hanagumi, they are defended by Anna, Jun, and Tamao. Meanwhile, Ren's team fights Peyote, Turbine, and Zang-Ching, but Ren is mortally wounded before Yoh arrives to save them.
18	A Fallen Comrade; Yomigaeru kamen (甦る仮面)	March 4, 2002; 978-4-08-873235-0	September 2, 2008; 978-1-4215-1881-7
Reincarnation 153. "The Old Ren is Gone" (あの日の蓮はもういない, "Ano hi no Ren wa mō inai"); Reincarnation 154. "Who the Heck?" (なにサマー, "Nani samā"); Reincarnation 155. "My Terms" (私の条件, "Watashi no jōken"); Reincarnation 156. "Sorry" (すまん, "Suman"); Reincarnation 157. "Thank You" (ありがとう, "Arigatō"); Reincarnation 158. "Emeth"; Reincarnation 159. "Tan-Tan-Tanuki and Its Thousand-Tatami Ghost Bubble" (たんたんたぬきの千畳敷です, "Tantan tanuki no Senjōjiki desu"); Reincarnation 160. "The Mask Restored" (蘇える仮面, "Yomigaeru kamen"); Reincarnation 161. "The Crying Mask" (泣く仮面, "Naku kamen")
When Ryu and Faust come to aid Yoh, all of Hao's soldiers leave. However, to save Ren, Yoh approaches Iron Maiden Jeanne and agrees to her condition that he will withdraw from the Shaman Fight if she will resurrect Ren. Recognizing that Anna is anxious about Yoh, Jun and Tamao convince her to leave with Redseb and Seyram while they take on the Hanagumi. The girls are overwhelmed by the Hanagumi's strength until Mikihisa arrives and drives them off.
19	Mt Osore Le Voile; Osorezan Revoir (恐山ル・ヴォワール)	May 1, 2002; 978-4-08-873274-9	November 4, 2008; 978-1-4215-1940-1
Reincarnation 162. "Prologue" (プロローグ, "Purorōgu"); Reincarnation 163. "Mt Osore Le Voile" (恐山Revoir un1, "Osorezan Revoir un"); Reincarnation 164. "Mt Osore Le Voile II" (恐山Revoir deux2, "Osorezan Revoir deux"); Reincarnation 165. "Mt Osore Le Voile III" (恐山Revoir trois3, "Osorezan Revoir trois"); Reincarnation 166. "Mt Osore Le Voile IV" (恐山Revoir quatre4, "Osorezan Revoir quatre"); Reincarnation 167. "Mt Osore Le Voile V" (恐山Revoir cinq5, "Osorezan Revoir cinq"); Reincarnation 168. "Mt Osore Le Voile VI" (恐山Revoir six6, "Osorezan Revoir six"); Reincarnation 169. "Mt Osore Le Voile VII" (恐山Revoir sept7, "Osorezan Revoir sept"); Reincarnation 170. "Mt Osore Le Voile VIII" (恐山Revoir huit8, "Osorezan Revoir huit")
When she discovers that Yoh has agreed to leave the tournament, Anna recalls about her first meeting with him five years ago. When Yoh was ten, he was sent to Aomori with his first spirit partner, the Nekomata spirit Matamune, to meet his potential wife at his grandmother Kino's house. Upon arrival, Yoh meets Anna, who coldly threatens him, and is attacked by Oni before Matamune saves him. When Yoh runs into Anna at a shop the next day, another Oni appears; Yoh fights back, but it disappears when Anna tells Yoh to escape. When they return to Kino's house, Yoh and Anna talk while watching television program together, and Yoh promises he will protect her from summoning Oni again.
20	Epilogue; Epirōgu (エピローグ)	August 4, 2002; 978-4-08-873295-4	January 6, 2009; 978-1-4215-2004-9
Reincarnation 171. "Mt Osore Le Voile IX" (恐山Revoir neuf9, "Osorezan Revoir neuf"); Reincarnation 172. "Mt Osore Le Voile X" (恐山Revoir dix10, "Oserezan Revoir dix"); Reincarnation 173. "Mt Osore Le Voile XI" (恐山Revoir onze11, "Osorezan Revoir onze"); Reincarnation 174. "Mt Osore Le Voile XII" (恐山Revoir douze12, "Osorezan Revoir douze"); Reincarnation 175. "Mt Osore Le Voile XIII" (恐山Revoir treize13, "Osorezan Revoir treize"); Reincarnation 176. "Mt Osore Le Voile XIV" (恐山Revoir quatorze14, "Osorezan Revoir quatorze"); Reincarnation 177. "Epilogue" (エピローグ, Epirōgu); Reincarnation 178. "Epilogue II" (エピローグ 2, Epirōgu 2); Reincarnation 179. "Epilogue II 'Ablutions'" (エピローグ 2 禊, Epirōgu 2 – Misogi)
Anna agrees to visit the shrine with Yoh, but her mind-reading powers overwhelm her, causing an extremely powerful Oni to form and become an Oh-Oni (great Oni). When Matamune is overpowered, the Oh-Oni abducts Anna and takes her to Mount Osore so she will summon more Oni for him to consume. To rescue Anna, Matamune uses the last of his powers to form an enormous sword Over Soul for Yoh to wield, though at the cost of giving up his physical form. With Matamune's sacrifice and Anna's heart opening up to Yoh, the Oh-Oni is defeated. Returning to the present, the X-Laws are about to revive Ren, whose soul tries to stop them when he realizes Yoh will leave the tournament for his sake.
21	Epilogue II; Epirōgu II (エピローグII)	October 4, 2002; 978-4-08-873327-2	March 3, 2009; 978-1-4215-2005-6
Reincarnation 180. "Epilogue II 'First Kiss'" (エピローグ 2 ファーストキッシュ, Epirōgu 2 – Fāsuto Kisshu); Reincarnation 181. "Epilogue III" (エピローグ 3, Epirōgu 3); Reincarnation 182. "Epilogue III 'Fool'" (エピローグ – 馬鹿, Epirōgu – Baka); Reincarnation 183. "Epilogue III 'Courage'" (エピローグ – 勇気, Epirōgu – Yūki); Reincarnation 184. "Epilogue III 'King'" (エピローグ – 王者, Epirōgu – Ōja); Reincarnation 185. "Epilogue III 'Victory'" (エピローグ – 勝利, Epirōgu – Shōri); Reincarnation 186. "Epilogue IV" (エピローグ 4, Epirōgu 4); Reincarnation 187. "Epilogue IV 'Boy'" (エピローグ 4 – ボーイ, Epirōgu 4 – Bōi); Reincarnation 188. "Epilogue IV 'Fairy Tale'" (エピローグ – フェアリーテール, Epirōgu – Fearī Tēru)
Despite Ren's efforts, he is revived by Shamash and is forced to escape with Ryu and Manta before he meets with Yoh to thank him. Upset with the recent turn of events, Horohoro finds Big Guy Bill and Brocken Meyer attacking the Icemen so they cannot leave the island where the tournament is taking place. However, Horohoro and the Icemen are unable to defeat Hao's followers until they are distracted by the appearance of Horohoro's father trying to leave the island. When Horohoro is nearly defeated by his opponents, Lyserg arrives and saves him with his new Archangel, Zelel, and takes the injured to be healed by Faust. However, Yoh's group is forced to flee when other followers of Hao find them, while Ryu is left behind and is nearly killed by Peyote and Turbine.
22	Epilogue III; Epirōgu III (エピローグIII)	December 4, 2002; 978-4-08-873348-7	June 2, 2009; 978-1-4215-2006-3
Reincarnation 189. "Epilogue V" (エピローグ 5, Epirōgu 5); Reincarnation 190. "Epilogue V 'The Third Force'" (エピローグ 5 – 第三勢力, Epirōgu 5 – Daisan seiryoku); Reincarnation 191. "Epilogue V 'Comedy'" (エピローグ 5 – 喜劇, Epirōgu 5 – Kigeki); Reincarnation 192. "Epilogue V 'Another Full Circle'" (エピローグ 5 – もう一廻り, Epirōgu 5 – Mō ichi mawari); Reincarnation 193. "Epilogue V 'Holes'" (エピローグ 5 – 穴, Epirōgu 5 – Ana); Reincarnation 194. "Epilogue V 'Commune'" (エピローグ 5 – コミューン, Epirōgu 5 – Komyūn); Reincarnation 195. "Epilogue V 'Trials'" (エピローグ 5 – 試練, Epirōgu 5 – Shiren); Reincarnation 196. "Epilogue V 'Everyone Together' (Part 1)" (エピローグ 5 – 全員集合 前編, Epirōgu 5 – Zen'in shūgō zenpen); Reincarnation 197. "Epilogue V 'Everyone Together' (Part 2)" (エピローグ 5 – 全員集合 後編, Epirōgu 5 – Zen'in shūgō kōhen)
Yoh learns from Amidamaru that Ryu is in danger and returns to save him. When Ryu dies while fighting Peyote and Turbine, he is revived by Sati from the Gandhara; because Gandhara aims to defeat Hao, his followers are forced to retreat. Meanwhile, Chocolove is confronted by the Golem when Redseb and Seyram find him with the goal of avenging their father. Yoh and Ryu arrive as Chocolove is killed; while Ryu is sent away to save Chocolove, Yoh fights the Golem and convinces Redseb that he should not fight out of blind hatred. However, the Golem begins to run rampant with Seyram inside and Yoh is impaled as Hao arrives, intent on destroying the Golem after revealing Seyram has been possessed by her father's ghost. A desperate Yoh is forced to contend with the rest of Hao's followers until his friends arrive at the behest of Lyserg. In the meantime, Chocolove's soul winds up in Hell, where his mentor appears and has Joco face the regret and guilt in his heart.
23	Epilogue IV; Epirōgu IV (エピローグIV)	February 4, 2003; 978-4-08-873381-4	July 7, 2009; 978-1-4215-2176-3
Reincarnation 198. "Epilogue V 'Friendship'" (エピローグ 5 – 友情, Epirōgu 5 – Yūjō); Reincarnation 199. "Epilogue V 'Stop'" (エピローグ 5 – 止, Epirōgu 5 – Tome); Reincarnation 200. "Epilogue V 'It'" (エピローグ 5 – め, Epirōgu 5 – Me); Reincarnation 201. "Epilogue V 'Now!' pt.3" (エピローグ 5 – る!, Epirōgu 5 – Ru!); Reincarnation 202. "Epilogue V 'Forbidden Finland'" (エピローグ 5 – 禁断のフィンランド, Epirōgu 5 – Kindan no Finrando); Reincarnation 203. "Epilogue V 'Indio Power'" (エピローグ 5 – インディオのカ, Epirōgu 5 – Indio no ka); Reincarnation 204. "Epilogue V 'In Indio'" (エピローグ 5 – インインディオ, Epirōgu 5 – In Indio); Reincarnation 205. "Epilogue V 'Pascal Avaf'" (エピローグ 5 – パスカル・アバフ, Epirōgu 5 – Pasukaru Abafu); Reincarnation 206. "Epilogue V 'Settle the Score!'" (エピローグ 5 – 決着だ!, Epirōgu 5 – Ketchakuda!)
Hao decides not to fight Yoh's friends, as he only came to assess Yoh's condition, and leaves. Due to his wound, Yoh faints while his friends try to disarm the Golem without harming Seyram. In hopes of saving his sister, Redseb tries to confront the Golem himself to calm down his father's spirit, but is nearly killed until Chocolove, having been revived by Sati of Gandhara, saves him. Chocolove manages to fight against Golem without problems, which Joco's mentor Orona explains is the result of using the spirit of Pascal Avaf, who Chocolove had awoken while he was in hell. Before the final clash, Anna's guardians demons stop the Golem and Chocolove.
24	Shaman Fight; SF	April 4, 2003; 978-4-08-873409-5	September 1, 2009; 978-1-4215-2177-0
Reincarnation 207. "Epilogue V 'Winds of Laughter'" (エピローグ 5 – 笑いの風, Epirōgu 5 – Warai no kaze); Reincarnation 208. "Shaman Fight" ("SF"); Reincarnation 209. "Comeback" (復帰か, "Fukki ka"); Reincarnation 210. "Back to Square One" (ふりだして, "Furidashi te"); Reincarnation 211. "Watch Out, Capt. Marco!" (アブねー!マルコ隊長, "Abunē! Maruko taichō"); Reincarnation 212. "Annihilation" (壊滅, "Kaimetsu"); Reincarnation 213. "Fallen Angel" (DA·天使, "DA Angel"; "DA tenshi"); Reincarnation 214. "Graduation" (卒業, "Sotsugyō"); Reincarnation 215. "Nerves of Steel" (豪胆マン, "Man of No Fear"; "Gōtan man")
Chocolove returns to life and holds off the Golem long enough for Redseb to reach his father, who regains his senses as the Golem's internal battery begins to run low. As Yoh recovers, Hao sends his follower Opacho with a message: if Yoh does not return to the Shaman Fight, Hao will kill the Munzer children. Because he must renege on his agreement with Iron Maiden Jeanne, Yoh confronts the X-Laws with the resolve to return to the Shaman Fight with force. Aided by his father's spirit partners and Amidamaru, Yoh manages to overpower the group until the untimely arrival of Luchist Lasso, who has come to protect Yoh and kill Jeanne. Revealed as the original founder of the X-Laws, Luchist and Marco begin a battle to the death that Yoh and Lyserg must stop.
25	Cornerstone; Kaname (要)	July 4, 2003; 978-4-08-873481-1	November 3, 2009; 978-1-4215-2178-7
Reincarnation 216. "Angel Bait" (罠パイオニア, "Spirit of Sword!!!"; "Wana Paionia"); Reincarnation 217. "Comeback Execution" (逆転葬らむ, "A Killing That Reverses Position"; "Gyakuten Hōmuramu"); Reincarnation 218. It's a Supercar (スーパーカーだ, "Supercar"; "Sūpākā da"); Reincarnation 219. "The Summit" (サミット, "Samitto"); Reincarnation 220. "I Must Win" (必勝, "Absolute Victory"; "Hisshō"); Reincarnation 221. "A Lotus in the Mud" (泥中の蓮, "Deichū no Ren"); Reincarnation 222. "Types of Buddha" (仏の種類, "Unconventional Buddhas"; "Hotoke no shurui"); Reincarnation 223. "Neutral, That's All" (中庸ということ, "The Middle Way"; "Chūyō to iu koto"); Reincarnation 224. "Humility" (不自負, "Not Self-Conceited"; "Fu jifu")
Yoh and Lyserg enact a clever strategy to defeat Luchist, during which they learn of Marco and Luchist's past together, the nature of the Archangels as developed spirits and that Jeanne is not a holy maiden but an ordinary girl with god-class shamanic powers. The X-Laws reluctantly become Yoh's allies when he convinces his friends that the only viable strategy for defeating Hao is to let him become Shaman King and strike while he is sleeping as he merges with the Great Spirit. However, in order to do so, they need to be amongst the finalists in the Shaman Fight, which means Ren's team must defeat the Myo from the Gandhara faction to advance.
26	The Brother's Nose; Brother's Nose (Ani no hana) (兄の鼻)	October 3, 2003; 978-4-08-873514-6	January 5, 2010; 1-4215-2179-2
Reincarnation 225. "Zero Tolerance (無糖, "Fudou"); Reincarnation 226. "Coordinated Cool" (息クール, "A Breath of Freshness"; "Iki Kūru"); Reincarnation 227. "Nipopo Tekunpe" (ニポポテクンペ, "Nipopo Gauntlets"; "Nipopo Tekunpe"); Reincarnation 228. "An Act" (芝居, "Shibai"); Reincarnation 229. The Magical Princesses" ("VS Magical Princess"); Reincarnation 230. "Mother" (母さん, "Kā-san"); Reincarnation 231. "Countdown to Destruction" (壊滅カウントダウン, "Kaimetsu Kauntodaun"); Reincarnation 232. "Space Operation X" (宇宙作戦X, "Uchū sakusen X"); Reincarnation 233. "The Brother's Nose" (兄の鼻, "Ani no hana")
Though Ren manages to overcome Myo's furyoku nullifying abilities, he and Chocolove are soon knocked out, leaving only Horohoro to fight. When his attacks drain the rest of Myo's furyoku, Ren's team is declared the winner. Meanwhile, the X-Laws's X-II fail an attempt to kill Hao, which has greater consequences than they are able to foresee. To avenge his brother's death at the hands of Jeanne, Anahol Pokki attacks the car that Jeanne, Manta, Lyserg, Tamao, and Marco are traveling. As Team Funbari Onsen trains for their next match, Yoh is approached by Lady Sati of Gandhara, who wants to see if he is one of her five warriors and kills him in order to send him to Hell for training.
27	Exotica; Ekizochika (エキゾチカ)	December 4, 2003; 978-4-08-873533-7	March 2, 2010; 1-4215-2180-6
Reincarnation 234. "Encounters in Hell" (地獄めぐりあい, "Jigoku meguriai"); Reincarnation 235. "Ancestor" (ご先祖さまで, "Go senzo sa made"); Reincarnation 236. "Not Quite a Family Reunion" (お盆ではないけれど, "This isn't O-Bon"; "Obon de wa nai keredo"); Reincarnation 237. "What's Wrong with a Memorial?" (供養したっていいんじゃないッ?, "May I Pay My Respects?"; "Kuyō shitatte iinjanai?"); Reincarnation 238. "Remain Neutral" (あくまで中立, "Akumade chūritsu"); Reincarnation 239. "A Great Trial" (大試練, "Dai shiren"); A Special One-shot Story: "Exotica" (エキゾチカ, "Ekizochika"); A Special One-shot Story, Part 2: Exotica Diary
Yoh and Amidamaru appear in Hell where they are given the task of fighting Yohken Asakura, an ancestor from the Asakura family who killed Hao in a past Shaman Fight. Though overwhelmed by Yohken's experience and techniques, Yoh creates a new Over Soul utilizing a sword in each of his hands to defeat Yohken. After Yohken regains his senses and he and Yoh discuss how to defeat Hao, his soul is suddenly shattered by a group of Oni intent on attacking Yoh. Meanwhile, Sati explains to Ryu and Faust that the five legendary warriors are the ones that control the elements, and she wants them to use five elemental spirits including Hao's Spirit of Fire to defeat Hao. However, Hao's followers appear with the intention of killing Sati and Gandhara.
28	A Good Woman; Beautiful Lady (Ii onna) (いい女)	March 4, 2004; 978-4-08-873572-6	May 4, 2010; 1-4215-2181-4
Reincarnation 240. "Separated in Hell" (地獄はなればなれ, "Getting Used To Hell"; "Jigoku wa nareba nare"); Reincarnation 241. "A Good Woman" (いい女, "Ii onna"); Reincarnation 242. "Ave Marco" (アヴェ·マルコ, "Ave Maruko"); Reincarnation 243. "The End of a Dream" (夢の終わり, "Yume no owari"); Reincarnation 244. "Seriously" (それは本気さ, "Sore wa honki sa"); Reincarnation 245. "The One Person I Can't Lose To" (負けられねえ奴, "Makerarenē yatsu"); Reincarnation 246. "Come Back to Life" (甦れ, "Rebirth"; "Yomigaere"); Reincarnation 247. "Hostility" (敵意, "Tekī"); Reincarnation 248. "Not an Angel" (天使なんかじゃない, "Tenshi nanka janai"); Bonus: "Haunted House Extras" (きもだあし, "Kimodaashi")
The Gandhara's Team Myo sends Ren's team to Hell to train; while Ren and Horohoro must face their own Hells under Matamune's guidance, Chocolove trains under Pascal Avaf. Lyserg, after being killed by Hao's ally Anahol, also appears in Hell, where he is guided by Avaf. Marco, having survived Anahol's attack thanks to Jeanne's intervention, attempts to send Tamao and Manta away to protect Lyserg and Jeanne until they can be revived by Sati. When Hao arrives, Ponchi escapes and returns with Anna, who holds Hao off while Tamao goes for help. When Sati is killed by Hao's followers, Faust resurrects Yoh just as he completes his tests in Hell and protects his friends. Meanwhile, the Patch Village is discovered by ordinary humans led by Manta's father, Mansumi; when Hao's followers try to attack them, Peyote betrays them and kills his comrades.
29	The Shaman Fight Shakedown; Screw the SF (Kutabare SF) (くたばれSF)	April 30, 2004; 978-4-08-873594-8	July 6, 2010; 1-4215-2182-2
Reincarnation 249. "The Shaman Fight Shakedown" (くたばれSF, "Screw the SF"; "Kutabare SF"); Reincarnation 250. "Raven" (黒雛, "Kurobina"); Reincarnation 251. "Twin Leaves" (双葉, "Futaba"); Reincarnation 252. "Empathy" (感情移入する, "Feeling Empathy"; "Kanjō inyū suru"); Reincarnation 253. "That Day" (あの日, "Ano hi"); Reincarnation 254. "In Black and White" (白黒, "Decisions"; "Shirokuro"); Reincarnation 255. "Forces of Nature" (自然の力, "Shizen no chikara"); Reincarnation 256. "High Spirits and Fate" (大精霊と運命と, "Dai seirei to unmei to"); Reincarnation 257. "Another Conclusion" (決着, "The Uncertain Outcome"; "Ketchaku"); Special Bonus: Funbari Poem: 8mm Cinema Paradise
After Peyote reveals to his comrades that Hao can read minds and that none of them truly know him, he kills himself. Anna struggles to hold her own against Hao, saving the Hanagumi's souls from being devoured, until Yoh arrives to stop Hao. The brothers have drinks together and discuss Hao's plan to absorb Yoh. Sati, revived by Faust, resurrects Jeanne and discloses the identities of the legendary warriors she has been looking for. When the Shaman Fight resumes with a match between Ren's team and Team Funbari Onsen to decide who will advance to the semi-final, Yoh reveals he wants to save Hao because Hao has no friends. During the fight, Ryu and Faust are both taken out, leaving Yoh to fight against Ren and Horohoro alone. The match reaches its final stages when they are interrupted by a revived Lyserg. Sati and Jeanne arrive and announce the withdrawal of several teams, leaving Team Funbari Onsen, Team Ren, the Hoshigumi, and X-I as the semi-finalists.
30	Extraordinary Days; The Abnormal Day (Hi nichijō-san) (非日常さん)	July 2, 2004; 978-4-08-873627-3	September 7, 2010; 1-4215-2183-0
Reincarnation 258. "Extraordinary Days" (非日常さん, "Hi nichijō-san"); Reincarnation 259. "That Place" (その場所, "Sono basho"); Reincarnation 260. "One Bad Woman" (悪い女, "Warui onna"); Reincarnation 261. "The First and the Last Time" (最初で最後の, "Saisho de saigo no"); Reincarnation 262. "Reiheit Scene" (ライハイト·シーン, "Raihaito shīn"); Reincarnation 263. "Teruko, the Voodoo Witch" (丑の刻参ラー輝子, "The 2:00 Curse Master...Teruko"; "Ushi no koku mairā Teruko"); Reincarnation 264. "The Crowning of the King" (キング誕生, "Birth of the King"; "Kingu tanjō"); Reincarnation 265. "Silva 2.0" (シルバスタイル2, "Silva Style 2"; "Shiruba Sutairu 2"); Reincarnation 266. "Plants" (プラント, "Puranto"); Special Bonus: Funbari Poem: The Bloom of Youth – Mickey's World
After the fight between Team Funbari Onsen and Team The Ren, Yoh and his friends relax in the hot springs. Hao accompanies them, explaining that the semifinals for the tournament will take place on the lost continent Mu and that Mansumi Oyamada has several ships prepared for attack the coast in order to find the continent. Hao proposes to Yoh and his friends that they stop Mansumi together, which they accept in order to see Hao's strength. The next day, all the shamans unite in the coast, where Hao uses his armor Over Soul from Spirit of Fire and destroys the majority of the ships with his overwhelming power. As the shamans enter Mu, all teams forfeit so that Hao will become the Shaman King and they begin their plan to defeat the ten Patch priests and Hao while he is asleep. As they advance to pursue Hao, Marco remains behind to fight against Luchist, with both of them dying in battle.
31	The Patch Song; Patchi Songu (パッチソング)	October 4, 2004; 978-4-08-873659-4	November 2, 2010; 1-4215-2184-9
Reincarnation 267. "Lead's Desert" (砂漠のナマリ, "Namari of the Desert"; "Sabaku no Namari"); Reincarnation 268. "Desert Fillet" (砂漠捌き, "Handling the Desert"; "Sabaku Sabaki"); Reincarnation 269. "Manaless Victory" (少ない巫力で勝つ, "Victory with Limited Furyoku"; "Sukunai Furyoku de katsu"); Reincarnation 270. "Making Up" (雨降って, "The Falling Rain"; "Ame futte"); Reincarnation 271. "A Heavy Door" (重い扉; "Omoi tobira"); Reincarnation 272. "Patch Song" (パッチソング; "Pacchi Songu"); Reincarnation 273. "Angelic Miracle" (天使がくれたキセキ; "Tenshi ga kureta kiseki"); Reincarnation 274. "What a Disgrace" (不様だな; "Buzama dana"); Reincarnation 275. "Calculating Mana" (巫力値を割り出す; "Furyoku chi wo waridashu"); Special Bonus: Funbari Poem: The Bloom of Youth: Mickey's World, Part 2
Yoh's group enters into the first of ten "Plants" from Mu, with only 15 hours before Hao awakes as Shaman King. In the Plant of the Desert, they are confronted by the priest Namari, who fights and kills Ryu, leaving Ren and Horohoro to finish him off. After Faust revives Ryu, the group moves to the 2nd Plant, where they are ambushed and ensnared by the officiant Bron, who kills Ren and Horohoro. Jeanne avoids capture from being in her Iron Maiden and fights back until Lyserg incinerates Bron. However, the group must advance without her after she uses up her furyoku resurrecting Ren and Horohoro. The remaining members of the group enter the 3rd Plant, where Ren fights Magna to redeem himself from his previous battle.
32	A Song Someday; Once Upon a Time Poem (Itsuka no shi) (いつかの詩)	January 5, 2005; 978-4-08-873694-5	January 4, 2011; 1-4215-2185-7
Reincarnation 276. "Announce the Current Values" (現在値を言う, Genzaine o iu); Reincarnation 277. "Planetarium" (プラネタリウム, Puranetariumu); Reincarnation 278. "Mike Performance" (マイクパフォーマンス, "Maiku Pafōmansu"); Reincarnation 279. "Scary Things" (怖い事, "A Terrible Event"; "Kowai koto"); Reincarnation 280. "A Song Someday" (いつかの詩, "Once Upon a Time Poem"; "Itsuka no shi"); Reincarnation 281. "For Everything" (今までずっと, "From Now On... Forever..."; "Ima made zutto"); Reincarnation 282. "Cows" (牛, "Ushi"); Reincarnation 283. "For the Time Being" (とりあえず, "Toriaezu"); Reincarnation 284. "Good Night" (おやすみ, "Oyasumi"); Reincarnation 285. "After the Dream" (夢のあと, "Yume no ato"); Special Bonus: "Funbari Poem: Funbari Hot Springs"; "Funbari Poem: Chapter 1: Prologue" (ふんばりの詩第一話「プロローグ」, "Funbari no Uta Chapter 1 'Prologue'"; "Funbari no shidai ichi wa 'purorōgu'"); "Funbari Poem: Chapter 2: Legendary Warrior" (ふんばりの詩第二話「伝説の戦士」, "Funbari no Uta Chapter 2 'Legendary Warrior'"; "Funbari no shidai ni wa 'densetsu no senshi'"); "Funbari Poem: Chapter 3: Lost Child" (ふんばりの詩第三話「迷子」, "Funbari no Uta Chapter 3 'Lost Child'"; "Funbari no shidai san wa 'maigo'"); "Funbari Poem: Chapter 4: Trying Hard" (ふんばりの詩 第四話「がんばる人」, "Funbari no Uta Chapter 4 'The Patient One'"; "Funbari no shidai yon wa 'ganbaru hito'"); "Funbari Poem: Chapter 5: Funbari Poem" (ふんばりの詩 第五話「ふんばりの詩」, "Funbari no Uta Chapter 5 'Funbari Poem'"; "Funbari no shidai go wa 'funbari no shi'")
Ren beats Magna and the group goes to the 4th Plant, where they fight Radim, the announcer from Shaman Fight. Faust and Yoh manage to defeat Radim, though at the cost of Faust's life, leaving the group without any means of resurrecting themselves. Meanwhile, the Gandhara manage to obtain three of the Elemental Spirits from Hell, leaving Sati to fight against King Enma to obtain the Spirit of Earth. Jun discovers that Redseb and Seyram have left for Mu with the Golem to help Yoh with facing Hao. The Munzer children are both killed upon finding Hao, who spares Redseb's soul so he can deliver the Spirit of Fire to Yoh's group, though Lyserg refrains from using it immediately. At the fifth plant, they find Kalim, who offers them a chance to rest before he fights them; they accept, going sleep to prepare to fight the remaining Patches and Hao next day. Upon waking the next morning, Manta finds Anna who has found out a way to go to Mu. The volume ends with Funbari Poem, a sequel series, which shows Yoh and Anna's son, Hana Asakura, searching for the five legendary warriors along with Ryu.

=== Chapters collected exclusively in kanzenban format ===
The following chapters are featured only in the kanzenban series volumes, which do not contain the original chapter 285. The additional chapters 265 and 266 are collected in volume 24 (ISBN 978-4-08-874226-7), renumbering all subsequent chapters of the series. Chapters 287–291 are in volume 26 (ISBN 978-4-08-874228-1) and chapters 292–300 in volume 27 (ISBN 978-4-08-874229-8). Some chapters in the original series were renamed, but otherwise contained the same content.

- Reincarnation 265. "Evil Given Shape" (悪の正体, "Aku no shōtai")
- Reincarnation 266. "True Justice" (真実の正義, "Shinjitsu no masayoshi")
- Reincarnation 287. "Good Morning, Mu" (グッドモーニング ムー大陸, "Guddo mōningu mū tairiku")
- Reincarnation 288. "Falling Damko" (フォーリンダム子, "Fōrin Damuko")
- Reincarnation 289. "Invisible Jungle" (インビジブルジュリーン, "Inbijiburu jurīn")
- Reincarnation 290. "Cats Take a Shine to the Loneliest People" (猫は寂しい人間(ひと)になつく, "Neko wa sabishii ningen (hito) ni natsuku")
- Reincarnation 291. "Hate Me, Nickrome! Or you will never be able to defeat me!" (憎めニクロム さもなくば俺は倒れん, "Nikume Nikuromu sa mo nakuba ore ha taoren")
- Reincarnation 292. "Tenacious Sproutling" (ど根性豆の木, "Dokonjō mame no ki")
- Reincarnation 293. "The Wind's True Power" (風の真価, "Kaze no shinka")
- Reincarnation 294. "Last Test: Shaman Fight"
- Reincarnation 295. "After the Dream" (夢のあと, "Yume no ato")
- Reincarnation 296. "Close Encounters of the Patch Kind" (パッチとの遭遇, "Patchi to no sōgū")
- Reincarnation 297. "Shaman King: God End Part 1" (シャーマンキング God End Part I, "Shāman Kingu God End Part I")
- Reincarnation 298. "Shaman King: God End Part 2" (シャーマンキング God End Part II, "Shāman Kingu God End Part II")
- Reincarnation 299. "Shaman King: God End Part 3" (シャーマンキング God End Part III, "Shāman Kingu God End Part III")
- Reincarnation 300. "The Last Word"
