= Yoh Asakura =

Fictional character from Shaman King

- Shaman King character
- Yoh Asakura as illustrated by Hiroyuki Takei
- First appearance: Chapter 1, "The Boy Who Dances with Ghosts"
- Created by: Hiroyuki Takei
- Voiced by: Yūko Satō (2001); Yōko Hikasa (2021) (Japanese); Sebastian Arcelus (2001); Abby Trott (2021); Lucien Dodge (Adult) (English)

In-universe information
- Spouse: Anna Kyoyama
- Children: Hana Asakura (son)
- Relatives: Hao Asakura (older twin brother)
- Spirit Allies: Amidamaru, seirei-class samurai spirit (presently); Matamune, seirei-class cat spirit (previously); Spirit of Earth
- Shamanic Mediums: "Harusame" (katana) "Futsu-no-Mitama no Tsurugi" sword antiquity

Yoh (Note: His name has been inconsistently romanized as Yoh, You or Yō; while in the English adaptations, his name is always romanized as Yoh.) Asakura (Japanese: 麻倉 葉, Hepburn: Asakura Yō) is a fictional character and protagonist of the manga series Shaman King created by Hiroyuki Takei. Yoh is a shaman with a lazy demeanor who is accompanied by a six-hundred-year-old samurai ghost, Amidamaru. When first introduced, Yoh appears as a young teenager who wishes to become the "Shaman King", the world's ruler, in an attempt to grant his own wish of living a peaceful life. However, as he befriends more people in the shaman fighting tournament to become the Shaman King, it is revealed Yoh has a twin brother named Hao Asakura whom he wishes to redeem. Yoh also appears in the prequel Shaman King Zero and in the sequel Shaman King Flowers, with the former being a story about his childhood and the latter being demoting him to cameo appearances as he travels around the world as his son, Hana, takes the leading role.

In the first series, his Japanese voice actress is Yūko Satō, and his English dub voice is provided by Sebastian Arcelus. In the second anime adaptation, Yoh's Japanese voice actress is Yōko Hikasa with his English dub voice in that series being provided by Abby Trott. He also appears as the protagonist in all the Shaman King video games and appears in multiple crossover fighting games alongside other characters that appeared in the same magazine that Shaman King debuted.

Critical reception to Yoh has been mostly positive, based on his interactions with other characters. The pacifism Yoh displays was praised for giving him a more unique trait as he helps to redeem enemies or avoid violence. Merchandising based on him has also been released.

== Creation ==
For Takei, Yoh was the hardest character to create; Takei explained that it was difficult to develop Yoh's character because of the criteria set by Weekly Shōnen Jump. The engagement between Yoh and Anna being introduced at the beginning of the story has been regarded as unusual for a shonen manga for its maturity and it partly reflects Takei's own personal experience, but it is still an ideal relationship in his opinion. According to Takei, while the protagonist is a projection of himself, Yoh was reenvisioned to make him different. Nevertheless, Takei decided to apply conventions from Weekly Shonen Jump tropes where Takei creates an axis and Yoh is led to overcome different difficulties.

Takei's editor Moriyoshi Yoshida said that Yoh stands out within heroes of the same genre due to his calm personality. This was a surprise to readers at the time. The introduction of a new, never-before-seen type of protagonist grabbed them instantly, and the series quickly became a popular title.

== Appearances ==
=== Shaman King ===
Yoh is the protagonist of Shaman King who befriends a student from school named Manta Oyamada when defeating local delinquents led by "Wooden Sword" Ryu. Yoh reveals himself to be a shaman with the help of a samurai ghost, Amidamaru. Yoh's purpose in coming to Tokyo: he has come to train for the Shaman Fight, an event that where shaman from all over the world will battle to become the god-like Shaman King. In order to ensure the trains properly, Yoh is joined by his fiancée Anna Kyoyama, an itako from Aomori, who drives Yoh relentlessly and brutally so that he may stand up to the powerful opponents he will have to contend with in order to become Shaman King. Despite Yoh's claims that he wishes to become Shaman King merely to live an easy life, his primary motivation is the promise he made to Anna whom he met when he was a child. The spirit of Matamune used his power to help Yoh save Anna when the latter's powers caused the creation of Onis.

Upon entering the Shaman Fight, Yoh meets a number of the shaman who would become his friends and allies. His mentor Silva teaches Yoh how create an Oversoul, a technique where he merges Amidamaru with his sword Harusame to use it as the main weapon. Upon the second round of the Shaman Fight, Yoh becomes the leader of "Team Funbari Onsen", which includes Ryu and Faust VIII as his teammates. Anna once again trains Yoh to increase his powers, especially to rival the shaman Hao Asakura who has once tried to win the tournament in his past life but was betrayed by his only friend, Matamune. Using both Harusame and Asakuras' sword-shaped relic Futunomitama no Turugi (フツノミタマの剣Futsunomitama no Tsurugi), Yoh creates the giant Oversoul O.S. Spirit of Sword (O.S. スピリット・オブ・ソード) inspired by Matamune's Oversoul.

It is revealed in the series Yoh was born as the younger of a pair of identical twin brothers to Keiko Asakura and Mikihisa Maki. Before Yoh's birth, it had been predicted that the family's progenitor, Hao, would reincarnate himself for the second time as one of Keiko's children and attempt to become Shaman King. The circumstances allowed the Asakuras to spare Yoh as the reborn Hao escapes and Yohmei raised his grandson with the hope that he would be able to defeat Hao. Upon learning of his lineage, Yoh becomes determined not only to stop Hao from realizing his plan to create a shaman only world, but also defeating the darkness in Hao's heart.

When briefly training in Hell, Yoh demonstrates a new power known as O.S. "Spirit of Sword: Byakkō (O.S. スピリット・オブ・ソード: 白鵠; lit. 'O.S. Spirit of Sword: White Swan'), which is smaller than his previous Oversouls despite using the same weapons and Amidamaru. In the next round of the Shaman Fight, Yoh convinces his allies to give up and let Hao become the winner. Yoh's group enter the Patch Plants to defeat Hao before he becomes the Shaman King, eventually facing all the Patches. Although Yoh's group is victorious against all Patch Officers, Hao kills them once he absorbs the Great Spirits. Inside the Grade Spirits, Yoh briefly uses one of the elemental spirits, Spirit of Earth (スピリット・オブ・アース, Supiritto Obu Asu), provided by Sati to battle Hao. When Hao's mind finds peace, Yoh makes peace with his brother and everybody killed by Hao are revived. Several years later, Yoh and Anna have a son named Hana Asakura who is raised by Tamao as the married shamans travel across the world. In the series' finale, Yoh meets with his son for the first time and has a gathering with his friends.

=== Other appearances ===
In Funbari no Uta, a series of short stories written by Hiroyuki Takei and set six or seven years after the conclusion of Shaman King, it is revealed that Yoh and Anna had a son named Hana. The child wields Yoh's Futsunomitama Sword and travels around with Ryu Umemiya in search of the Five Elemental Warriors. An older Yoh and Anna do not appear until the conclusion of the short series, apparently on their way to Funbari Hill, as they have been traveling around the world in order to resolve various conflicts. In their absence, Hana was raised by Tamao Tamamura with no awareness of who his actual parents are, though Tamao intends to tell him when his parents return at last.

Yoh and Anna also appear in flashbacks in Shaman King Flowers, the sequel from Shaman King series set years after Funbari no Uta with Hana. Shaman King Flowers also show Yoh alongside and Anna escaping from unknown enemies during the time Hana was a baby. In these flashback, the family was killed and revived by Hao. When Hana dies once again, he meets Hao who creates a replica of teenage Yoh to test Hana's skills.

Yoh appears as a playable character for the Nintendo DS titles, Jump Superstars and Jump Ultimate Stars. He also appears as a main character in the various video games based on the Shaman King series.

== Reception ==
He has been featured various times in the Animage's Anime Grand Prix polls, ranking as one of the most popular male anime characters. Merchandise based on Yoh have been released, including action figures, key chains, and plush toys. In a Shaman King popularity poll from 2018, Yoh's first appearance was voted as the series' most popular character.

Critical reception to Yoh's character has been both positive and negative. Justin Freeman from Anime News Network qualified Yoh as an "easy-going" person. He criticized the fact that "Yoh is a vessel for his ephemeral allies, but in reality, they up end being a vessel for him, to the benefit of no one." Den of Geek commented that Yoh's actions in the first chapters of the manga where he meets spirits in one-shot formats were pointless as it might be the reason why both anime adaptations of the manga removed them in favor of the more important fights he has against Tao Ren and Tao Jun regardless of rushed pacing. Writing for Mania Entertainment, Eduardo Chavez commented that Yoh is "such a laid back casual character", and that "Yoh's attitude to not go beyond his own abilities might be a little lazy" but he thinks that is "a smart approach to conserve mental and physical strength." Chris Beverdige also from Mania said Yoh is "very much a laid back slacker." Alexander Hoffman of Comics Village declared "in this first novel, letting the relationships between Yoh, Amidamaru, and Manta flesh out is more important that developing every spiritual entity that shows up." Active Anime's Holly Ellingwood praised the Yoh's "much more idealistic and noble [position] than that of his rivals." While reviewing the manga's twenty-second volume, Margaret Veira from Active Anime remarked the scenes in which Yoh starts feeling rage to the point she said "you can feel the anger emanating from the page! It feels so real!" In the book "Summoning the Spirits: Possession and Invocation in Contemporary Religion", author Andrew Dawson called Yoh the "Japanese Shaman" as he is not based on any religion unlike other characters appearing in the series despite noting some his relationship with the spirit of Amidamaru who is closed on Buddahood. Dawson also praised Yoh's character for being relatable with most of the readers of the series.

In the book, "A Gathering of Spirits: Japan's Ghost Story Tradition: From Folklore and Kabuki to Anime and Manga Edición Kindle", Yoh's encounter with Faust VIII is compared with a folklore tale about how Buddhists have to accept death to properly appreciate life in contrast to Faust's desire to revive his wife. This fight takes place in a Western graveyard unlike previous graveyards shown in the manga which are more Eastern.

Yoh's pacifism was compared with that of the Rurouni Kenshin lead Himura Kenshin due to Takei having worked as an assistant to manga author Nobuhiro Watsuki before he started writing Shaman King. Anime News Network praised Yoh's pacifism for often helping to redeem villains like the cruel Tokageroh who did horrible actions in past life as well as Tao Ren in later episodes as he changes into a more caring person due to Yoh's laidback attitude. IGN also enjoyed Yoh's laidback attitude especially during fight scenes as tries to avoid harming to avoid his enemies in the process. A reviewer for The Star also noted that Yoh's pacifism often leads to his former enemies to become kinder as well as become his allies as a result of interacting with them which makes his quest memorable. While criticizing the series for relying on powers in a similar way to the brute force employed in Dragon Ball Z, Yoh was noted to be an exception to these types of battles as Yoh's pacifism leads him to understand his enemies and defeat them without hurting them in the process. Youko Hikasa and Abby Trott's performances as Yoh's Japanese and English voice actors, respectively, were also the subject of praise.
