= Samurai Cat =

Fictional character created by Mark Rogers

Miowara Tomokato and his nephew Shiro, as shown on the cover of The Adventures of Samurai Cat.

Samurai Cat (a.k.a. Miaowara Tomokato) is the main character in a series of books by Mark Rogers. To accompany the anachronistic satire, almost every page in each book has a picture painted by Rogers, depicting the events described on that page. Each chapter is a bizarre parody of some historical or pop culture event, but the event is always treated as an entirely serious one. For example, no one finds it at all unusual that Tomokato is an upright, talking, sword-wielding cat.

The basic premise of the story is that Japan's greatest warrior Miaowara Tomokato is out for revenge, after his master Oda Nobunaga is killed. The group that leads the attack on Nobunaga's castle is made up of characters from throughout time, space and the big screen, so Tomokato must travel all over the Earth and beyond to seek his vengeance (from Japan to Camelot to Valhalla to Mars, to name just a few) in the most violent ways possible, involving the deaths of hundreds of beings.

In the first book, The Adventures of Samurai Cat, Rogers skewers J. R. R. Tolkien's Middle-earth, H. P. Lovecraft's "The Shadow Over Innsmouth", Robert E. Howard's Conan the Barbarian, and Norse mythology.

With the second book, entitled More Adventures of Samurai Cat, Rogers goes after the movies (while still referencing pulp literature), satirizing Indiana Jones, and fusing it with King Arthur and the Knights of the Round Table in the search for the Holy Spad (a biplane armed with two 15 mm machineguns and God's own special effects (Celestial Lights and Magic), complete with 3D glasses for safe viewing). From there, Tomokato and his firearms-obsessed nephew Shiro travel to Edgar Rice Burroughs' Martian Barsoom. Rogers saves his most biting humor for the last chapter, which takes on Star Wars.

By the third book, Samurai Cat in the Real World, Rogers take on historical figures like the Third Reich, Chicago gangsters, and finally Joseph Stalin and the Communist Party.

Subsequent books include The Sword of the Samurai Cat, Samurai Cat Goes to the Movies and Samurai Cat Goes to Hell. In the last of these, Tomokato dies and finds himself in a parody of Dante's Inferno, perhaps to close off demand for any more books.

From June to September 1991, Epic Comics released a three-issue miniseries comic book version of Samurai Cat with the covers rendered by Rogers, but with additional artwork done by others.

== TV series and film ==
A television series of the same name was released in October 2013, titled Neko Samurai (Samurai Cat), but is unrelated to the book series.

== See also ==
- Nekogahara, a similar themed manga series by Hiroyuki Takei
