= Butsu Zone =

Japanese manga series

- Third tankōbon volume cover

仏ゾーン (Butsu Zōn)
- Manga
- Written by: Hiroyuki Takei
- Published by: Shueisha
- Imprint: Jump Comics
- Magazine: Weekly Shōnen Jump
- Original run: March 3, 1997 – August 14, 1997
- Volumes: 3
- icon

Butsu Zone (仏ゾーン, Butsu Zōn; "Buddha Zone") is a Japanese manga series written and illustrated by Hiroyuki Takei. It was serialized in Shueisha's Weekly Shōnen Jump from March to August 1997, with its chapters collected in three tankōbon volumes. "Buddha Zone" is the concept by which a Buddha can appear on Earth using a Buddha statue.

The series highlights the adventures of Senju (the Thousand-Hand Avalokiteśvara Bodhisattva) who has to find and protect Sachi, an incarnation of the Buddha Miroku (Maitreya Bodhisattva). Miroku is said to appear on Earth at a time when the Dharma is no longer taught and is completely forgotten, achieve complete enlightenment and then re-teach the pure dharma, becoming a successor of Śākyamuni Buddha, the founder of Buddhism. It is thus Senju's job to aid Miroku (Sachi) in achieving enlightenment, enabling her to achieve Buddha.

== Premise ==
In 1975, a young orphan girl named Sachi protests against the planned destruction of the temple Saigan (her home) by the Minoura clan, who plans to build a hotel in its place. When one of the gangsters notices the statue of the Thousand-Hand Kannon within the temple, Sachi tells them that she will not allow anything to happen to the statue. In response, the gangsters laugh and threaten her, telling her that there is nothing the statue can do to save her. However, the Thousand-Hand Kannon comes to life, breaking the temple doors and attacking one of the gangsters. The statue shatters into pieces and inside it is a boy who tells them to lay their hands off Sachi, sending fear amongst the gangsters who then flee, vowing revenge. The boy introduces himself as Senju, the Thousand-Hand Kannon.

Senju, as an emissary of the buddha Kannon, has appeared in the human world to find and protect the reincarnation of the future Buddha, Miroku. Recognizing Sachi as Miroku, Senju reveals that it is his mission to accompany her to India where she will awaken and achieve enlightenment to save the world from destruction. However, they are inhibited by the Mara, forces that seek to pollute with earthly desires, and Buddha who believe that Senju is not strong enough to protect Sachi from harm.

== Characters ==
Senju (センジュ)
Senju, known as the Thousand-Hand Avalokiteśvara, is a Bodhisattva sent to protect the incarnation of the bodhisattva Miroku by Dainichi Nyorai (Mahavairocana). He wears garments called a Tenne (天衣, ,"celestial garments") and has an arm ring on his left arm. Because his original statue was made of wood, Senju can float.
Sachi Saigan (西岸サチ, Saigan Sachi)
A young girl who was abandoned by her parents 10 years before the beginning of the story and raised by a poor priest. Sachi is an incarnation of the Buddha Miroku. She is initially suspicious towards Senju, but eventually follows him to avoid being attacked constantly by the envoys of Mara.
Jizō (ジゾウ, Jizō)
(The Bodhisattva Ksitigarbha) Senju's childhood friend. He had waited for 2500 years for Miroku's appearance. His primary attack is the Mudra Beam (印ビーム, In-bīmu); he also has the Jizō Armor (地蔵天衣, Jizō āmā) which he used only once in the series.
Mike Minoura (マイク箕浦, Maiku Minoura)
The leader of the Minoura clan, Minoura destroyed Sachi's temple, but was defeated by Senju. He and his clan later become Buddhist monks and help rebuild the temple. The origin of the character name is American comic book artist and writer Mike Mignola.
Ashura (アシュラ)
The main antagonist. A former Bodhisattva who went towards Mara. He is the leader of the forces opposing the awakening of Miroku. He was once friends with Senju.
Koma (コマ)
A stone lion/dog looking statue who originally posed next to a temple, he was rescued by Senju when he was thrown. He followed Senju onto Earth.
Bato (バトウ)
The Bodhisattva Hayagriva, he was sent to replace Senju when the situation becomes critical.
Anna Kyoyama (恐山 アンナ, Kyōyama Anna)
An itako priestess who possesses the ability to summon the dead using her body as a medium and wields the sword Harusame. Found on Mount Osore, she was raised by an elderly itako, whom Anna views as a grandmother. She has a cheerful and indomitable spirit, along with an unscrupulous desire to obtain money in order to travel the world and find her birth parents. Her character later inspired Anna Kyoyama, one of the main characters of Takei's later work, Shaman King.
Junkei (順慶)
A wood carver and sculptor who created Senju's body. He modeled Senju's appearance based on that of his deceased sister, Osen. Senju and the other communicate with him using Anna as a medium.

== Media ==
=== Manga ===
Butsu Zone is written and illustrated by Hiroyuki Takei. The manga was serialized in Weekly Shōnen Jump from March 3 to August 14, 1997. Shueisha collected the nineteen individual chapters known as "Butsu" into three tankōbon. The first was published on July 4, 1997; the final was released on December 4, 1997. Shueisha re-released the series in two volumes on July 18, 2007.

==== Volume list ====
No.	Title	Release date	ISBN
1	When You Pray to a Buddha Statue, You're Calling on a Real Hero!! "Butsuzō o mitara hero to omoe!!" (仏像を見たらヒーローと思え!!)	July 4, 1997	4-08-872306-6
1. "When You Pray to a Buddha Statue, You're Calling on a Real Hero!!" (仏像を見たらヒーローと思え!!, "Butsuzō o mitara hero to omoe"); 2. "The Enemy of Buddha! His Name is Māra" (仏敵!奴の名は魔羅, "Hotoke kataki! Yatsu no na wa Māra"); 3. "Onigiri" (おにぎり, "Onigiri"); 4. "Koma" (コマ, "Koma"); 5. "Seven" (セブン, "Sebun"); Extra: "Butsu Zone" (仏ゾーン, "Butsu Zōn")
2	The One Who Dominates His Passions "Bonnō o tatsu otoko" (煩悩を断つ男)	October 3, 1997	4-08-872307-4
6. "The Decisive Battle on the Japanese Seas" (日本海の決戦, "Nihonkai no kessen"); 7. "Benevolence and Hatred" (慈悲と憎悪, "Jihi to zōo"); 8. "Thank You" (ありがとう, "Arigatō"); 9. "A New Journey" (新しい旅立ち, "Atarashii tabidachi"); 10. "The One Who Dominates His Passions" (煩悩を断つ男, "Bonnō o tatsu otoko"); 11. "Strong feelings, strong love" (強い気持ち強い愛, "Tsuyoi kimochi ai"); 12. "Anna" (ANNA, "ANNA"); Extra: "Death Zero" (デスゼロ,, "Desu Zero")
3	Decisive Fight on the Riverside of Sai "Sai no kawara no kessen" (賽の河原の決戦)	December 4, 1997	4-08-872308-2
13. "The Itako Anna Calls a Busshi" (イタコのアンナ仏師を呼ぶ, "Itako no Anna Busshi o yobu"); 14. "The Busshi with Many Wounds" (傷だらけの仏師, "Kizu darake no Busshi"); 15. "Decisive Fight on the Riverside of Sai" (賽の河原の決戦, "Sai no kawara no kessen"); 16. "Dangerous Hotoke" (危険仏, "Kiken hotoke"); 17. "Batō Ōjō" (バトウ往, "Bato ōjō"); 18. "Jizō, All Worldly Things are Transitory" (地蔵諸行無常, "Jizō shogyō mujō"); 19. "The Future" (未来, "Mirai"); Extra: "Itako Anna" (ITAKOのANNA,, "Itako no Anna")

=== Audio drama ===
- "Butsu Zone - The chapter of Awakening" (仏ゾーン 悠久の章,, "Butsu Zōn: Kakusei no Shō")
- "Butsu Zone - The chapter of Ordeal" (仏ゾーン 試練の章,, "Butsu Zōn: Shiren no Shō")
- "Butsu Zone - The chapter of Eternity" (仏ゾーン 悠久の章,, "Butsu Zōn: Yūkyū no Shō")
