= Nekogahara =

Japanese manga series by Hiroyuki Takei

- First tankōbon volume cover, featuring Norachiyo

猫ヶ原
- Genre: Historical, samurai
- Manga
- Written by: Hiroyuki Takei
- Published by: Kodansha
- English publisher: NA: Kodansha USA
- Imprint: Magazine Edge KC
- Magazine: Shōnen Magazine Edge
- Original run: September 17, 2015 – April 17, 2018
- Volumes: 5
- icon

Nekogahara: Stray Cat Samurai (猫ヶ原, Nekogahara) is a Japanese manga series written and illustrated by Hiroyuki Takei. It was serialized in Kodansha's shōnen manga magazine Shōnen Magazine Edge from September 2015 to April 2018.

== Plot ==
Set in an alternative version of Feudal Japan inhabited by anthropomorphic Persian cats. Norachiyo's bell hangs from his katana sheath, but he is nonetheless a stray—a rōnin, as he travels across a dishonest world, cutting through pretense and deception with his blade.

== Publication ==
Written and illustrated by Hiroyuki Takei, Nekogahara: Stray Cat Samurai was published in Kodansha's shōnen manga magazine Shōnen Magazine Edge from September 17, 2015, to April 17, 2018. Kodansha collected its chapters in six tankōbon volumes, released from April 15, 2016, to May 17, 2018.

In North America, Kodansha USA announced the English release of the manga in March 2016.

=== Volumes ===
No.	Original release date	Original ISBN	English release date	English ISBN
1	April 15, 2016	978-4-06-391001-8	October 25, 2016	978-1-63236-365-7
2	November 17, 2016	978-4-06-391038-4	February 14, 2017	978-1-63236-396-1
3	June 16, 2017	978-4-06-391077-3	October 17, 2017	978-1-63236-397-8
4	May 17, 2018	978-4-06-511328-8	September 11, 2018	978-1-63236-438-8
5	May 17, 2018	978-4-06-511329-5	November 20, 2018	978-1-63236-503-3

== See also ==
- Samurai Cat, a character from a similar themed media franchise by Mark Rogers
