= Jumbor Barutronica =

Japanese manga series

- Tankōbon volume cover

重機人間ユンボル (Jūki Ningen Yunboru)
- Genre: Adventure, fantasy
- Manga
- Written by: Hiroyuki Takei
- Published by: Shueisha
- Imprint: Jump Comics
- Magazine: Weekly Shōnen Jump
- Original run: December 18, 2006 – March 5, 2007
- Volumes: 1
- Manga

Jumbor
- Written by: Hiroyuki Takei
- Published by: Shueisha
- Imprint: Jump Comics
- Magazine: Ultra Jump
- Original run: July 17, 2010 – May 19, 2015 (on hiatus)
- Volumes: 8
- icon

Jumbor Barutronica (Japanese: 重機人間ユンボル, Hepburn: Jūki Ningen Yunboru) is a Japanese manga series written and illustrated by Hiroyuki Takei. It was serialized by Shueisha's shōnen manga magazine Weekly Shōnen Jump from December 2006 to March 2007, with its chapters collected in a single tankōbon volume. Two one-shot chapters were published in Shueisha's seinen manga magazine Ultra Jump in October 2009 and February 2010, and after that, Takei relaunched the series under the title Jumbor in the same magazine in July 2010; the series has been on indefinite hiatus since 2015.

== Plot ==
The background of story revolves around the human civilization in 3002 where destruction and challenge were brought by the harsh nature. In this era of constant war against nature and havoc, construction teams were the star of economy system, the conquering force as well as a weapon themselves, because heavy robots were used in construction works to speed up efficiency.

Baru Craw was the leader of a famous construction team for the kingdom of Dorvok. One day, as their group was about to start a reconstruction work of a tunnel which was destroyed by an earthquake, a much more powerful construction team arrived and claimed the land in no time, killing Baru who tried to protect his teammates against the cruel Genber Diode.

Baru woke up in 3007, finding himself revived in his own cloned memory transplanted inside a physical body of a five years old, and in addition to that, his body was partly mechanized. His robot arms are linked up to and directly controlled by his brain's signals. He was told that the country of Dovork is now gone and the princess Rivetta and the king Tabill disappeared. He was also told he was 'last of the series' created by the Dr. Road Docult. He created eleven Jumbors with every one of them have construction related powers like a drill, crane, shovel. Baru, Nipper and Rivetta began their journey for the restoration of the Kingdom of Dovork.

== Publication ==
Written and illustrated by Hiroyuki Takei, Jumbor Barutronica was serialized in Shueisha's shōnen manga magazine Weekly Shōnen Jump from December 18, 2006, to March 5, 2007. (Note: The series finished in the magazine's 14th issue (cover date March 19), released on March 5 of that same year.) Shueisha collected its ten chapters in a single tankōbon volume, released on May 2, 2007. Between chapters, Takei put nine Jumbor Supplement Column" (ユンボル補足コラムそ, Yunboru hosoku koramu) and a setting data collection at the end of the volume. Shueisha re-released the series in two kanzenban volumes, under the title Jumbor Angzengbang (ユンボル 安全版, Yunboru Anzenban), on August 4, 2010.

Takei released two one-shot chapters in Shueisha's seinen manga magazine Ultra Jump on October 19, 2009, and February 19, 2010. After that, Takei relaunched the series, under the title Jumbor (ユンボル -JUMBOR-, Yunboru), in the same magazine on July 17, 2010. In October 2014, Takei stated that he would end the manga sometime in 2015; its 53rd and latest chapter was released on May 19, 2015, and in July of that same year, it was announced that the manga would enter indefinite hiatus. Shueisha collected its chapters in eight volumes, released from December 3, 2010, to July 4, 2014.

No.	Release date	ISBN
1	May 2, 2007	978-4-08-874377-6
1. "The Birth of Jumbor" (生まれるユンボル, Umareru Yunboru) "1st: The Origin of Jumbor" (ユンボルの語源, Yunboru no gogen); 2. "The Princess Come-back" (復活のプリンセス, Fukkatsu no purinsesu) "2nd: Clone, memory and Jumbor horns" (クローンと記憶とユンボルホーン, Kurōn to kioku to Yonboru hōn); 3. "There Are 11 Of Them!" (11人おる！, 11 hito oru!) "3rd: The Fonctions of a Jumbor" (ユンボルホーンとその働き, Yonboru toso no dōki); 4. "Dr. Docult's Super Kunpō" (Dr.ドカルトのSUPER工法(クンポー), Dr. Dokaruto no Sūpa Kunpō) "4th: The Armaments of a Jumbor" (ユンボルの装備品, Yonboru no Sōbihin); 5. "In Twomessio..." (ツメシオにて, Tsumeshio nite) "5th: Construction Method (Kunpō)" (工法（クンポー）とテツグンテ, Kunpō to Tetsugunte); 6. "The Low Sun" (低い太陽, Teii Taiyō) "6th: The Earth Movers (1)"; 7. "Garden of Juden" (ユデンの園, Yuden no en) "7th: The Earth Movers (2)"; 8. "Remember, Rivetta" (リメンバーリベッタ, Rimenbār Ribeta) "8th: Barutronica" (バルトロニカ, Barutoronika); 9. "Docult's Trap" (ドカルトトラップ, Dokaruto torāpu) "9th: Jumbor: A Word of Man,"ユンボル～男の世界～ (Yonboru Otoko no Sekai); 10. "And Then, Towards Construction" (そして建設へ―, Soshite kensetsu he) "Setting Data Collection – Jumbor Japan" (出し切り設定資料集 ユンボルJAPAN)
