= The Adventures of Samurai Cat =

- Cover of the first edition
- Author: Mark E. Rogers
- Illustrator: Mark E. Rogers
- Cover artist: Mark E. Rogers
- Language: English
- Series: Samurai Cat
- Genre: Fantasy
- Publisher: Donald M. Grant, Publisher, Inc.
- Publication date: 1984
- Publication place: United States
- Media type: Print (hardback)
- Pages: 127 pp
- ISBN: 0-937986-60-7 (trade edition); ISBN 0-937986-61-5 (deluxe edition)
- OCLC: 14640041
- Dewey Decimal: 813/.54 19
- LC Class: PS3568.O449 S35 1984
- Followed by: More Adventures of Samurai Cat

The Adventures of Samurai Cat is a collection of linked humorous fantasy short stories by Mark E. Rogers. Rogers had done a series of paintings and drawings which feature his character Samurai Cat and spoofing martial arts films and fantasy stories. He went on to write stories to fit the paintings. The collection was first published in 1984 by Donald M. Grant, Publisher, Inc. in an edition of 2,225 copies, of which 425 were issued as a deluxe edition, and were slipcased, signed and numbered.

== Contents ==
- "Katemusha"
- "The Bridge of Catzad-Dûm"
- "The Book of the Dunwich Cow"
- "Beyond the Black Walnut"
- "Against the Gods"
