= Anna Kyoyama =

- Shaman King character
- Anna Kyoyama as illustrated by Hiroyuki Takei
- First appearance: Chapter 9, "The Shaman King"
- Created by: Hiroyuki Takei
- Voiced by: Megumi Hayashibara (Japanese); Tara Jayne (English)

In-universe information
- Spouse: Yoh Asakura
- Children: Hana Asakura (son)

Anna Kyōyama (Japanese: 恐山 アンナ, Hepburn: Kyōyama Anna) is a fictional character created by manga author Hiroyuki Takei. She appears in Shaman King as a primary character, while an alternate character with the same name and similar appearance appears in Butsu Zone, and Itako no Anna, a one-shot chapter which focuses on Anna (and where she first made her appearance). Takei notes in an interview, that she is like his own personal mascot or good luck charm because Anna appears (albeit usually in cameos) in so many of his works.

For both anime adaptations of Shaman King, she is voiced by Megumi Hayashibara in Japanese and by Tara Sands in the English dub. In some Japanese products and in Shaman King: Master of Spirits, her name is spelled Anna Kyoh'yama.

== Overview ==
In Shaman King, Anna is the fiancée and later wife of Yoh Asakura, and is an itako (spirit medium in the English 4Kids dub) – a traditional Japanese shaman. Her specialty is channeling, and she can summon a spirit from anywhere, even from heaven where normal shamans cannot reach. She is depicted as a relatively thin girl with shoulder-length blonde hair who wears a short black dress, traditional sandals, and blue prayer beads she uses as an itako. Anna frequently wears a red scarf tied around her head, though she occasionally wears the scarf around her neck. In addition to the prayer beads she wears around her neck, she wields another set of beads called 1080 (pronounced 10, 80) which she uses to fight strong spirits and shamans. Anna attends Shinra Private Academy along with Yoh and Manta and her favorite singer in the manga, Ringo Awaya, is a reference to Japanese singer and guitarist Shiina Ringo.

Anna's first appearance in the manga occurs after Yoh narrowly defeats Tao Ren. Thereafter, she starts her "special training" program to help Yoh become Shaman King; she is unrelentingly brutal with his training to the extent that Yoh refers to the regimen as torture instead. Aggressive and decisive, Anna is a pragmatic person who, to most, appears cold and harsh. However, she has shown that she genuinely cares for those important to her, especially Yoh, and merely is dedicated to being "the ultimate Shaman Queen" and wife to Yoh, the first real friend that she ever had in her life. She holds a deep gratitude for Yoh for saving her life, thus she believes it is her responsibility as Yoh's wife to train him hard so he can achieve his dream of becoming Shaman King despite her claim it is so he can realize her dream of living a comfortable life.

As a shaman, Anna possesses tremendous spiritual ability and mastery of shamanic techniques; her impressive strength allowed her to seal in Hao Asakura's shikigami guardians – Zenki and Kouki – and take control of them as her spirit allies. She shows little fear of Hao, whom she detests, and does not hesitate to successfully slap him. In response, Hao expresses interest in her, possibly because she resembles Asano-Ha, the mother of his original incarnation 1000 years ago, and because of the extent of her power.

Despite how badly she seems to treat him, Anna unquestionably loves Yoh and explicitly admits to it. Because she is certain of her assessment of his abilities, she rarely loses her composure when he is in danger unless something completely unexpected arises, such as when she believes Yoh was about to be killed while being possessed by Tokagero. She can be extremely possessive of Yoh, beating him up once when she thought that the Oracle Bell he brought home was a woman's pager. Yoh is constantly intimidated by Anna, seemingly fearing her wrath even more than Hao, though his feelings for her are expressed in how the promise he made to her to become Shaman King is the greatest motivation he has to continue fighting. Despite her harsh demeanor and strong will, she is gentle and kind to those she cares about.

== History ==
Anna was abandoned as a young girl because her parents became afraid of her strong shamanic powers, which included the ability to see into other people's minds without being willing to. Left on Mount Osore, she was found by Yoh's grandmother, Kino Asakura, who took Anna as an apprentice and gave her the surname Kyōyama (恐山), an alternate reading of the characters for Mount Osore (恐山, Osorezan). Recognizing Anna's inherent potential, Yoh's grandparents decided that she would be a suitable bride for Yoh.

Before meeting Yoh, Anna's mind-reading power known as reishi (soul sight) was one that she could not fully control. She could not help but pick up the negative emotions of others every time she was around other people; because of this, she began to hate others, and this hatred would involuntarily manifest itself as an Oni (demonic ogres, akin to boogeyman in Western cultures). Thus, she tried to avoid going out as much as possible, usually confining herself to her room.

Anna and Yoh met when they were ten years old in 1995 at Mt. Osore, shortly after Yoh and Matamune arrive in Aomori to visit Kino. Yoh is attacked by an oni, unaware that it came from Anna, who cryptically warns Yoh to stay away from her. However, Yoh persists in trying to get to know Anna and eventually learns that Anna's negative emotions create the oni, who are beyond her control. Matamune, as one of the Asakura family's most powerful spirits, was chosen to accompany Yoh to save Anna from herself because her powers closely resembled those of Matamune's former master, Hao Asakura.

Yoh's positive influence on Anna allows her to gradually open her heart and she accepts his invitation to accompany him to a temple on New Year's Eve. However, the selfish desires of the tremendous number of people present overwhelm Anna, who summons a powerful oni that begins absorbing another oni nearby. The Oh-Oni created gains the ability to speak and kidnaps Anna to take her to Mount Osore to absorb the lurking spirits there. Matamune sacrifices his physical form to give Yoh the power to defeat the Oh-Oni and save Anna, whose heart opens enough to admit that while she will never forget her deep-seated resentment towards humans and the world, she has begun to love Yoh. Yoh and Anna can destroy the Oh-Oni, whose body is forged by Kino to become the 1080 beads.

Because Yoh freed her from the darkness that haunted her each day, she grows to love him and resolves to become stronger so as not to feel the same pain in the past and to repay him for everything he sacrificed for her.

== Other appearances ==
Anna appears in Takei's short story Funbari no Uta; she has a son named Hana Asakura and she is married to Yoh. The short story takes place 6 years after the conclusion of the Shaman King manga, implying that she became pregnant soon after or before the final Shaman Fight. While Anna does not appear directly in Shaman King: Flowers, either she or the Anna who appears in Butsu Zone or Itako no Anna is responsible for training Silva's daughter, who was named after Anna and possesses a strong resemblance to her mentor.

The character that Anna is based on also stars in a one-shot comic called Itako no Anna, which focuses mainly on her character and appears in Takei's other short work, Butsu Zone, as an ally to the main characters. Though the character is an itako in both works and possesses a similar appearance and background, the Anna Kyoyama who appears in Itako no Anna and Butsu Zone has a cheerful and enthusiastic personality compared to the aggressive and intimidating Anna in Shaman King. She wields the sword Harusame (which would reappear in Shaman King as a primary medium for Amidamaru) and expresses an interest in traveling to find her birth parents. It is suggested that Anna I, an itako who trained under the Asakura family and moved to Los Angeles, is likely the Anna who appeared in Butsu Zone. She is mentioned as having succeeded in the business and regularly sent information obtained on the Patch Tribe to the Asakuras, which aided Anna Kyoyama and her companions in locating the Patch Village. Anna I is responsible for training Anna III, the daughter of Patch Officiant Silva, who also has a strong resemblance to the prototype for Anna.

Anna and Yoh also appear in a flashback of the manga Shaman King Flowers, the sequel to Shaman King series which took place six or seven years after Funbari no Uta with Hana Asakura, Yoh and Anna's son as the main character.

Anna appears as a playable character for the Nintendo DS titles, Jump Super Stars and Jump Ultimate Stars and is the main playable character in the second mission of the Shaman King world where she fights Dio Brando and Frieza.

== Reception ==
She has been featured various times in the Animage's Anime Grand Prix polls, ranking as one of the most popular female characters. Merchandise based on Anna have been released, including action figures, key chains, and items for cosplay. Anna is also the mascot of the Aomori prefectural police.

Chris Beveridge from Mania.com said Anna "brings that hardass kind of charm that only some women can manage to the show."
