= Oshira-sama =

In Japanese folk religion, a kami or deity of the home

Oshirasama (Japanese: おしら様, おしらさま, お白様, オシラ様, or オシラサマ, Hepburn: oshira-sama) is a tutelary deity of the home in Japanese folklore. It is believed that when Oshirasama is in a person's home, one cannot eat meat and only women are allowed to touch it. Born from a stallion and human woman, "images of this god [Oshira] are usually composed of the faces of a horse and a maiden."

The festival day for Oshirasama is called meinichi (命日, or a death anniversary). It is held on the 16th day of the first, third, and ninth month of the Japanese lunar calendar.

== Legend ==
According to myth, Oshira-sama was born from a stallion and a maiden falling in love. Angered by the affair, the maiden's father killed the stallion and stripped it of its skin. "The skin then wrapped itself around the daughter and took her up to heaven. Later, they descended from heaven, incarnated as silkworms. After this they became the guardian gods of families and were called Jūrokuzen no kami." The original story can be read in Sōushén Jì, a Chinese classic written in the fourth century." Variations of this myth exist, however, the core significance of providing household protection through purification and foretelling fortunes remains generally constant.

== Ritual practice ==
Having emerged from great hardship, the Oshira god is often invoked by Itakos or shamans to provide healing to individuals facing similar turmoil in their personal lives. Prayer-songs aimed at Oshira-sama generally take two pathways: "songs describing all the operations connected with the manufacture of silk, from the rearing of the silkworms to the storing of the woven silk, and chants recounting his origin." Primarily owned and carried by itakos, depending on the region, some families possess a set of Oshira-puppets themselves: "These are sticks originally made of the wood of the same mulberry tree on which the horse hide was hung, one of them, the girl, ending in a human head, the other one, the chestnut Sendan, in a horse's head." Itakos will typically sing a ritual song while dancing and waving the torimono (general handheld prop in many Japanese Shinto rituals) about. Additionally, these puppets "are always 'clothed,' usually very simply but in many layers, a new layer being added each year. They are held one in each hand during the dance through which the shaman summons her possessing spirits."

== In popular culture ==
The deity is also a character for the film Spirited Away. In the American version of the film the character is called Radish Spirit.
