= Mark E. Rogers =

American author and illustrator (1952–2014)

Mark E. Rogers (April 19, 1952 – February 2, 2014) was an American author and illustrator.

== Biography ==
Rogers, while a student at Pt. Pleasant Beach High School, wrote a short novel, The Runestone, which was adapted into Willard Carroll's 1990 film starring Peter Riegert and Joan Severance, although it remains unpublished, except as a numbered, signed limited edition chapbook published by Burning Bush Press in 1979. At the University of Delaware he continued his interest in writing, graduating summa cum laude with a Bachelor of Arts degree in 1974. He was elected to membership in Phi Beta Kappa.

He thereafter became a professional writer. His published works include the Samurai Cat series; a number of novels, The Dead, Zorachus, and the latter's sequel, The Nightmare of God; a series of books known as Blood of the Lamb; and another series called Zancharthus. He also published three art portfolios and a collection of his pin-up paintings, Nothing But A Smile.

== Death ==
Rogers often had heart problems, he died from apparent heart failure while hiking with his family in California's Death Valley.

== Bibliography ==
=== Samurai Cat ===
- (1980) The Bridge of Catzad-Dum - chapbook, published by The Burning Bush Press, ltd. ed. of 500
- (1984) The Adventures of Samurai Cat
- (1986) More Adventures of Samurai Cat
- (1989) Samurai Cat in the Real World
- (1991) The Sword of Samurai Cat
- (1994) Samurai Cat Goes to the Movies
- (1998) Samurai Cat Goes to Hell

=== Zorachus ===
- (1986) Zorachus
- (1988) The Nightmare of God

=== Blood of the Lamb ===
- (1991) The Expected One
- (1991) The Devouring Void
- (1992) The Riddled Man

=== Zancharthus ===
- (1998) Blood and Pearls
- (2000) Jagutai and Lilitu
- (2002) Night of the Long Knives

=== Novels ===
- (1989) The Dead
- (2010) Lilitu
- (2010) Yark

=== Nonfiction ===
- (2003) Nothing But a Smile: The Pinup Art of Mark Rogers
- (2005) The Art of Fantasy
