= Hiroyuki Takei =

Japanese manga artist (born 1972)

Hiroyuki Takei 武井宏之
- Born: May 15, 1972 (age 54); Yomogita, Aomori, Japan
- Occupation: Manga artist
- Years active: 1994–present
- Employer: Kodansha
- Known for: Shaman King
- Children: 1 (born 1990)
- Relatives: Hirofumi Takei (brother)
- Awards: 48th Tezuka Award with an honorable mention for Anna the Itako

Signature
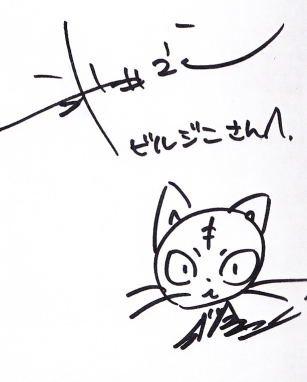

Hiroyuki Takei (武井 宏之, Takei Hiroyuki; born May 15, 1972 in Yomogita, Aomori) is a Japanese manga artist. He is best known as the creator of Shaman King.

== Career ==
Hiroyuki Takei started drawing manga with writer EXIAD on SD Département Store Series which they created for a fanzine. Early in his career, he became the assistant to Tamakichi Sakura on The Form of Happiness (しあわせのかたち, Shiawase no Katachi) as Turtle-san (カメさん, Kame-san) in 1992 and Kōji Kiriyama (Ninku). At that time, he also submitted his first one-shot Dragdoll Group to the Tezuka Award but was rejected. In 1994, Takei submitted his short story Anna the Itako to the 48th Tezuka Award and won the honorable mention. He was later introduced to Nobuhiro Watsuki and became his assistant along with Eiichiro Oda on Rurouni Kenshin.

Takei published his short story Death Zero in Weekly Shōnen Jump winter special and Butsu Zone in the summer special of 1996. A reworked version of Butsu Zone became his first manga series published in Weekly Shōnen Jump of 1997. Takei's longest-running series, Shaman King began serialization in Shueisha's Weekly Shōnen Jump in 1998, though was forced to conclude in 2004. In 2007, Takei returned three years after the conclusion of Shaman King with a new Weekly Shōnen Jump series, entitled Jumbor Barutronica. Set in the distant future, construction workers pilot mecha. One of them is killed and his memories are implanted in his clone, a thirty-year-old man in a five-year-old superpowered construction tool body. The series was canceled after ten issues and released in one volume.

During the Jump Festa 2008, Shueisha announced a kanzenban reprint of Shaman King. This release reprinted the entire series in 27 volumes complete with new covers while concluding the never-before-published "true ending." On March 4, 2008, Japanese publisher Shūeisha announced that Takei would be collaborating on Karakuri Dôji Ultimo with American comic creator Stan Lee. The project launched with the new Jump SQ.II (Jump Square Second) spinoff manga magazine on April 18, 2008. The announcement of the partnership was made in the April issue of Jump Square magazine.

As of 2010, Takei is working on two monthly series: Jumbor, written by Hiromasa Mikami (御上 裕真, Mikami Hiromasa) and Karakuri Dôji Ultimo with Stan Lee.

On February 15, 2017, when answering a fan's question, Hiroyuki Takei revealed on his official Twitter that he received an offer for an anime remake of his representative work Shaman King, but had to turn it down because they were not able to use the first anime's voice actors and soundtrack music. In June 2020, a new anime television series was announced, which aired from April 1, 2021, to April 21, 2022 and featured several returning cast members from the 2001 anime series in both the Japanese and the English dub.

== Inspiration ==
Takei named Hirohiko Araki's series JoJo's Bizarre Adventure and Baoh as his favorite manga when he was younger. In an interview with Shonen Jump, he also cited Taiyo Kosoku by Baru, Blade of the Immortal by Hiroaki Samura, and Hellboy by Mike Mignola as favorites. Takei has also been influenced by American comic books, Mecha anime and Osamu Tezuka.

== Works ==
=== Serializations ===
From	To	English Translated Title	Serialized in	Volumes	Notes
1997	1997	Butsu Zone	Weekly Shōnen Jump	3 tankōbon, 2 kanzenban	
1998	2004	Shaman King	Weekly Shōnen Jump	32 tankōbon, 27 kanzenban, 35 tankōbon (reprint)	Final kanzenban released in 2009 with previously unpublished material.
2007	2007	Jumbor Barutronica	Weekly Shōnen Jump	1 tankōbon, 2 kanzenban	
2009	2015	Karakuri Dôji Ultimo	Jump SQ (2009—2011), Jump SQ.19 (2012—2015)	12 tankōbon	Stan Lee (concept)
2010	—	Jumbor	Ultra Jump	8 tankōbon	Hiromasa Mikami (writer)
2012	2014	Shaman King: Flowers	Jump X	6 tankōbon	
2015	2021	Hyper Dash! Yonkurō	CoroCoro Aniki	4 tankōbon	Spin-off of Zaurus Tokuda's Dash! Yonkuro
2015	2018	Nekogahara	Shōnen Magazine Edge	5 tankōbon	
2018	2024	Shaman King: The Super Star	Shōnen Magazine Edge (2018–2023), Magazine Pocket (2024)	10 tankōbon	

=== One-shots ===
Year	English Translated Title	Featured in	Notes	Included in
1994	Anna the Itako		48th Tezuka Award, honorable mention	Butsu Zone volume 3
1996	Death Zero	Weekly Shōnen Jump Winter Special		Butsu Zone volume 2
1996	Butsu Zone	Weekly Shōnen Jump Summer Special		Butsu Zone volume 1
2003	Exotica	Weekly Shōnen Jump Issue #40		Shaman King volume 27
2009	Karakuri Dôji Ultimo:0	Jump SQ.II	Stan Lee (concept)	
2009	Jumbor	Ultra Jump #11	Hiromasa Mikami (writer)	Jumbor kanzenban volume 1
2010	Jumbor – The Desert With a Floor Heater	Ultra Jump #3	Hiromasa Mikami (writer)	Jumbor kanzenban volume 2
2011	Little Battlers eXperience – Kaidō Jin Gaiden	CoroCoro G Winter Issue	Credited as HIRO	
2011	Little Battlers eXperience – Boost Gaiden	CoroCoro G Summer Issue	Credited as HIRO	
2012	Yahabe	Jump SQ 9		

==== Shaman King specials ====
Year	English Translated Title	Featured in	Included in
1999	Funbari Poem	Akamaru Jump Summer	Shaman King volume 5
2000	Funbari Poem – 2000	Akamaru Jump Winter	Shaman King volume 7
2000	Funbari Poem – 3000 Leagues to Funbari Hill	Akamaru Jump Spring	Shaman King volume 9
2000	Funbari Poem – Four Leaf Clover	Akamaru Jump Summer	Shaman King volume 10
2001	Funbari Poem – Rokujizō Night	Akamaru Jump Winter	Shaman King volume 13
2001	Funbari Poem – Secrets of the Star Festival	Akamaru Jump Spring	Shaman King volume 14
2001	Funbari Poem – 8mm Cinema Paradise	Akamaru Jump Winter	Shaman King volume 29
2002	Funbari Poem: The Bloom of Youth – Mickey's World	Akamaru Jump Spring/Summer	Shaman King volume 30
2003	Funbari Poem: The Bloom of Youth – Mickey's World, Part 2	Akamaru Jump Winter	Shaman King volume 31
2003	Funbari Poem: Chapter 1 – Prologue	Akamaru Jump Spring	Shaman King volume 32, kanzenban 22
2003	Funbari Poem: Chapter 2 – Legendary Warrior	Akamaru Jump Summer	Shaman King volume 32, kanzenban 23
2004	Funbari Poem: Chapter 3 – Lost Child	Akamaru Jump Winter	Shaman King volume 32, kanzenban 24
2004	Funbari Poem: Chapter 4 – Trying Hard	Akamaru Jump Spring	Shaman King volume 32, kanzenban 25
2004	Funbari Poem: Chapter 5 – Funbari Poem	Akamaru Jump Summer	Shaman King volume 32, kanzenban 26
2004	Mappa Dōji	Weekly Shōnen Jump Issue #18	Shaman King kanzenban 25
2011	Shaman King: Zero – New Shimane Paradise	Jump X Issue #5	Shaman King: Zero volume 1
2012	Shaman King: Zero – Tears of the Ren	Jump X Issue #6	Shaman King: Zero volume 1
2012	Shaman King: Zero – Dresses with Wolves	Jump X Issue #7	Shaman King: Zero volume 1
2012	Shaman King: Zero – A Little Wicker Man	Jump X Issue #8	Shaman King: Zero volume 1
2012	Shaman King: Zero – Matagawa Under the Bridge/Gag of New York	Jump X Issue #9	Shaman King: Zero volume 1

=== Fanzines ===
- SD Departement Store Series (SD百貨店シリーズ, "SD Hyakkaten Series")
- Jumbor Japon (Self-published at Comiket 73)

=== Unreleased ===
- Thunder of Judgement (裁きの雷, "Sabaki no ikazuchi") (Concept/Script:EXIAD)
- Dragdoll Group (ドラグドール団, "Doragudōru dan") (Rejected submission for the Tezuka Awards)

=== Character design ===
- Anna Kyoyama from Shaman King is the mascot for the police station in the Aomori Prefecture.
- Smash Bomber (スマッシュボマー) was a series of toys and a manga created for Takara Tomy. Takei was hired as art supervisor and one of his assistants, Daigo Katō (加藤 大悟, Katō Daigo), drew the manga which ran in V Jump during issue number 8 to 10 in 2006. The series was canceled after 3 chapters and never met the intended 197 pages announced in the first chapter.
- Character design of Hanhel Tsunagin (ハンヘル・ツナーギン, Hanheru Tsunāgin) and his axe True Hash for Phantasy Star Portable 2.
- Original character designs of Garo: The Animation.
- Original character designs for the original anime series, Shine On! Bakumatsu Bad Boys!.
- Original character designs for the Bikkurimen anime series based on the stickers from the wafer snack, Bikkuriman.

=== Other works ===
- Illustrator for the Cardfight!! Vanguard Trading Card Games.
