= Itako =

Spirit mediums of Japan, strictly blind women

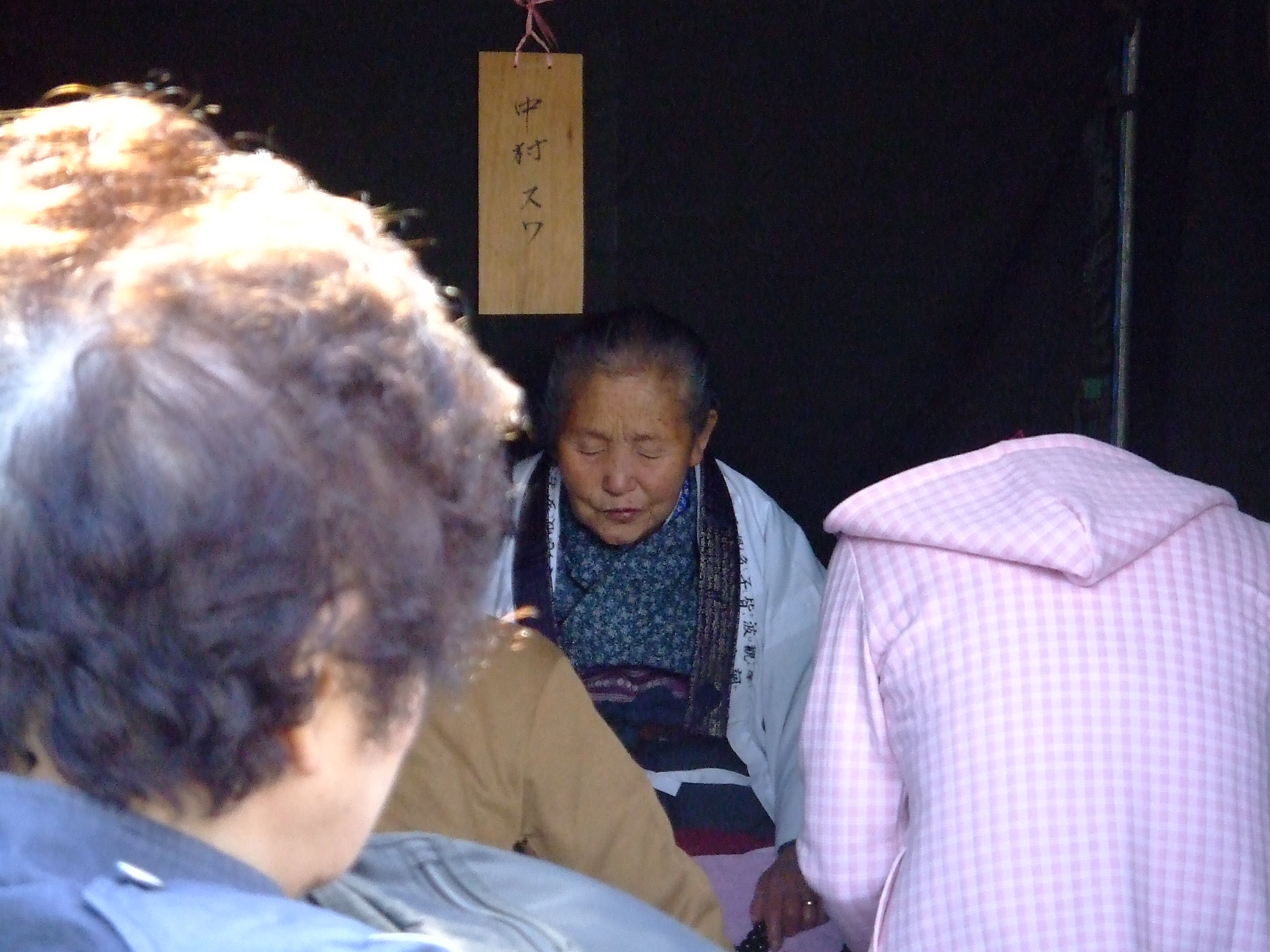
An itako at the autumn Inako Taisai festival at Mount Osore, Aomori Prefecture, Japan.

Itako (Japanese: イタコ), also known as ichiko (市子) or ogamisama (オガミサマ), are blind women who train to become spiritual mediums in Japan. Training involves severe ascetic practices, after which the woman is said to be able to communicate with Japanese Shinto spirits, kami, and the spirits of the dead. Itako perform rituals tied to communication with the dead and divination. The practice has been on the decline. As of 2009, there were only 20 living itako in Japan, all more than 40 years old.

Training for itako traditionally began at a very young age, and included ritualized exposure to cold water. Hundreds of buckets of ice water could be poured on their bodies over the course of a few days. This education for itako takes about three years, and also includes memorization of songs and sutras. At the end of this training, a ceremony is held, announcing the marriage of the itako and her patron spirit.

Scholars suggest that blindness has long been associated with spiritual powers in Japan. Furthermore, options for those with severe vision impairment to become self-sufficient were limited in ancient times. This led many families to send young blind women to itako apprenticeships up until the start of the Meiji era, which outlawed itako rituals outright.

Today, itako are most commonly associated with Mt. Osore in Aomori prefecture. There, itako gather for an annual festival to channel the dead for thousands of tourists. Itako perform ceremonies to communicate with spirits of the recently deceased, including those of aborted and stillborn children.

== History ==
Itako are always blind, or have very poor vision. In pre-modern Japanese society, blindness was widely associated with spiritual capabilities; after the introduction of Buddhism, it was considered evidence of a karmic debt. These beliefs lent an aura of "ambiguous sacred status" to the blind. During the Edo era, women were expected to contribute to family wages. However, blind women of the era had limited opportunities to support themselves or their families. The reputation of blindness and spiritual abilities led many families to seek training for young girls, typically aged 11 to 13, in a folk religious tradition in which the young girl was wed to a deity, and there on able to communicate with spirits. Despite this power, blind women who became itako were still considered to occupy one of the lowest social strata within the community, especially those who relied on community support for financing their training.

Itako are thought to have risen from an ascetic cult of the Edo era, the yamabushi, male monks who were encountered during popular pilgrimages to the Kii mountains in the 9th–10th centuries. These monks had wives who traveled with them, selling amulets and channeling the dead through trances. Meanwhile, women in the north performed the dances and rituals of shrine miko. Over time, the two groups merged, creating the modern concept of itako.

In 1873, the Meiji era government attempted to ban itako and their associated kuchiyose rituals as a means of encouraging the adoption of modernized medicine. An estimated 200 itako were practicing at the time. The law led to the arrest of mediums across Japan; by 1875, itako and their healing rituals were specifically targeted and could be arrested on sight. Arrests of itako were based on charges such as spreading superstition, to obstruction of medical practices. Newspaper accounts of these arrests indicate that itako were commonly attributing illnesses to possession of the ill by cats or foxes. Newspaper reports at the time tended to refer to itako in negative terms, and often associated the arrest of itako and the arrest of prostitutes. One editorial wrote, "These miko disgorge reckless and empty gossip, squeezing the pockets of the common people, and prostitutes tempt loose men and rob them of their money. While the professions are different, they are the same in disrupting public morals and deceiving people of their possessions."

Public support, however, continued. Shortly before, and after, the surrender of Japan in 1945, many families sought out itako to communicate with the war dead, particularly those who were lost in combat abroad. Just before the end of the war, itako were also called upon to conduct "living seances" (ikiguchi) with soldiers overseas. An editorial by intellectual Orikuchi Shinobu at the time noted that the itako in Aomori prefecture had "not been subject to prohibition", in contrast to itako and shaman in other prefectures, and that "persecution would be counterproductive". News stories reported locals occasionally interfering with the police attempts to arrest prominent itako.

Today, the small number of living itako gather annually during the Obon holiday at Mt. Osore in Aomori, known locally as "Mount Dread". The gathering has received televised news coverage since the 1960s.

== Description ==
Itako typically carry several artifacts. These include a kind of box called a gehōbako (外法箱; literally "non-Buddhist box", in reference to practices outside of Buddhism), which contains secret items that may be representative of a protective spirit, or kami. Blacker describes an old folk tale tying the box, and its contents, to an inugami ritual. In this ritual, a dog is buried up to its neck and starved, while staring at food too far for it to reach. The itako place the animal's skull into a box and offer its spirit a daily offering of food. In return, the spirit enters homes of her patrons and provides detailed information about the dead.

Itako also carry a black cylinder (called an odaiji, sometimes an omamori), often bamboo, containing another protective charm and their certificate of itako training. The cylinders are said to be used to trap the spirits of animals that attempt to possess a human being. Finally, the women carry beaded necklaces (いらたか念珠, irataka nenju), which are used in ceremonies and made up of beads and animal bones. The bones are typically jaw bones of deer or foxes, but have also included bear teeth, eagle claws, or shells.

== Definition ==
The term "itako" has associations with beggars, and some mediums reject the use of the term. One theory suggests the term derived from "eta no ko", or "child of the eta", referring to the Japanese burakumin social class who were once associated with death. Other possible derivations include the use of wood pieces, ita, for the ceremonial writing of the name of the deceased.

The itako (then ita) are first referenced in poem #1773 of the ancient Nara period poem collection, the Man'yōshū. Anthropologist Wilhelm Schiffer describes a local legend about the practice of recruiting blind women into shamanism. According to this legend, the practice began in an undetermined era when blind children were killed every 5 years. A local official, impressed with a blind woman's ability to describe her environment despite her lack of vision, determined that the blind must have special powers. Rather than being killed, he pressed for the blind to study necromancy.

Itako is the common term for these women in Aomori, Iwate and Akita prefectures, but the term can vary by location. They are also commonly called ogamisama in southern Iwate and Miyagi prefectures; miko, mogodo, onakama or waka in Yamagata prefecture; and waka in Fukushima, Tochigi and Ibaraki.

=== Kamisama ===
There are similarities to another group of shaman women, the kamisama. Both kamisama and itako believe in a marriage to a spirit, and both follow the Buddhist deity Fudo Myoo. However, kamisama are sighted, typically claiming prophetic powers in the aftermath of a traumatic disease. Unlike itako, they are associated with small Shinto shrines, which they may operate themselves. Kamisama tend to view itako with suspicion, though ethnographers have found that kamisama often associate themselves with itako and itako traditions.

== Rituals ==
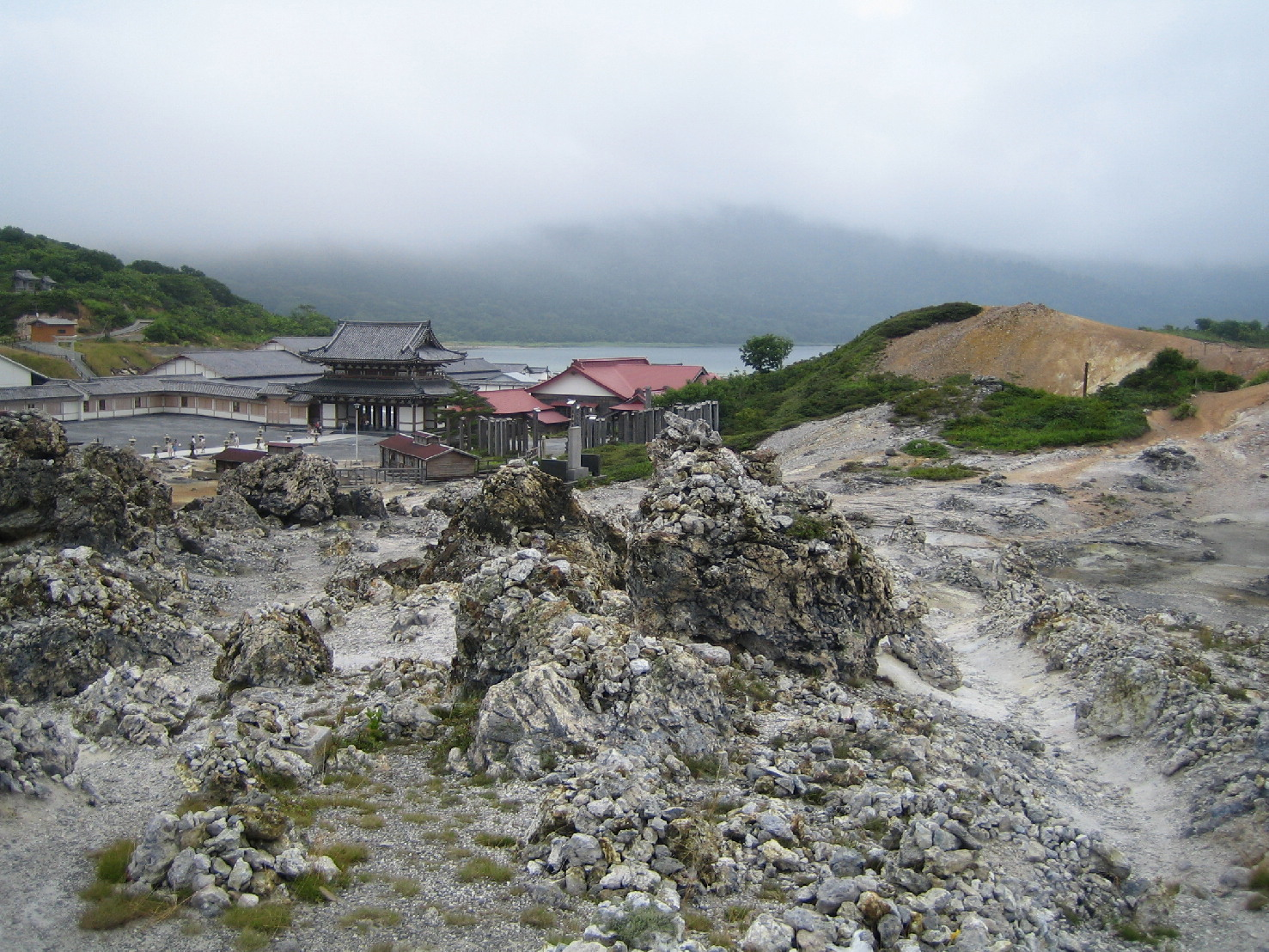
Osorezan and Lake Usori. Aomori prefecture, Japan.

Itako are said to have the ability to communicate with both kami and the dead. An itako's role varies depending on the spirit she is connected to. Ceremonies vary by prefecture, but typically itako are called upon to communicate with kami spirits to garner favor or advisement on harvests, or to communicate with the spirits of the dead, particularly the recently deceased. The rituals typically take place on Mount Osore, which is locally associated with this "traditional" ritual, though evidence suggests itako withdrew to the mountain to escape pressure from the Meiji state. The ceremony had traditionally taken place in the ancestral home of the dead.

Ceremonies draw on a series of Shinto practices, but most often call upon Buddhist gods. Some chants of the itako are similar to secret practices of Yoshida Shinto, and may be tied to practices at Ise shrine.

Itako perform the ceremony using Tsugaru dialect, and a series of "taboo words" that are not understood by all native Japanese speakers. Locals, who understand the Tsugaru dialect, are therefore often employed as translators for the itako. Folklorists suggest that this allows the itako to avoid any need to personalize the communication from the departed spirit.

=== Kuchiyose ===
The ritual of contact with the dead, kuchiyose (口寄せ), has been named an intangible cultural heritage asset of Japan. The ritual has been documented as early as 1024 AD in the Eiga monogatari (栄花物語).

The ritual is held during a funeral or anniversary of a death, though some itako claim the dead cannot be contacted until 100 days have passed. Once the spirit communicates its own status in the afterlife, patrons receive advice and predictions for the future.

Visitors to the itako typically bring fruit, candy or other gifts, and offer the age, relationship, and gender of the deceased, but not the name.

During the ceremony, purifying rice and salt are scattered, and a spirit is said to enter the body of the itako. Gods are called forward and asked to compel the desired spirit or ghost to come forward. Calling the dead usually involves calling upon a hierarchy of spirits in reverse order, beginning with kami and rising to the level of ghosts. Then, the local kami is called forward to protect those attending the ceremony. During the summoning of the deceased (hotoke oroshi), the itako sings songs, called kudoki, said to be relayed by the contacted spirit. The spirit of the dead arrives and shares memories of its life and the afterlife, answering questions for patrons. Then, the spirits are sent away, and songs are sung about "hell, insects, and birds." A final spell is repeated three times: “The old fox in the Shinoda woods, when he cries during the day, then he does not cry in the night”. The interaction lasts about 15 minutes.

As recently as 1962, ethnographers observing itako rituals noted a shaking of hands and use of special voices when channeling the dead. More recent observers note that itako sang in their own voices, without any visual performance of entering a trance-state. The ritual songs are typically repeated to many patrons, suggesting that the itako are understood, even by their patrons, to be theatrical performers. Nonetheless, a survey of 670 people with chronic illnesses in the area around Osorezan Mountain, home of many itako, showed that 35% of those patients had visited itako to take part in a kuchiyose ritual.

=== Mizuko kuyō ===
Mizuko kuyō (水子供養) is a ceremony performed for mothers who have lost their children in childbirth or through abortions. The ritual, Buddhist in nature, gives the unborn or stillborn child a name, and then calls upon the protection of the spirit Jizo. The ceremony is considered by many to be a scam preying on grieving mothers, owing to its relatively recent origins in the 1960s. Others, however, see the practice as addressing a spiritual need created by Japan's legalization of abortion in 1948.

=== New Year Ebisu ===
Itako must learn a chant known as the New Year Ebisu (正月えべす, shōgatsu-ebesu), a celebration of the New Year delivered in travels at the start of Spring. The chant mixes Buddhist references (such as peacocks) and aspects of the Japanese national anthem. Scholars suggest the language reveals the chant is derived from songs associated with the hinin.

=== Kamioroshi ===
The kamioroshi (神降ろし) ritual is a musical performance dedicated to Oshirasama, a god of family. This ritual includes the performance of a song describing a horse who falls in love with a young human girl and is flayed alive; the girl falls ill, but is cured when the horse descends from heaven and flies her to India. The story is told through a dance including sticks with the heads of a horse and human girl on each side. This dance is known as the Ebisu Mai, or the "God of wealth dance," and it is said that the dolls become possessed by kami spirits during the performance.

=== Musical performance ===
Itako are associated with the catalpa bow (梓弓, azusa yumi), a plucked instrument with ties to summoning the dead. The necromantic ritual of plucked instruments is found in the earliest document of Japan's history, the Kojiki, which describes a koto's sound in conjunction with the possession of a medium and the channeling of the dead. Another poem describes the sound of the instrument as a reflection of his wife's spirit possessing the instrument. The biwa hoshi, itinerant blind priests, have a similar history with the instrument.

The chant which opens the kamioroshi ceremony makes several references to the plucked bow. The chant announces that the first pluck of the string calls down the gods of the village, the second calls down the gods of the prefecture, and the third calls the gods of all prefectures in Japan. Additional notes summon more powerful gods, responsible for ever-increasing spans of land and spiritual realms. These gods are sent away in reverse order at the end of the ceremony.

== Training ==
Women usually enter itako training at a young age, prior to menstruation, at the encouragement of her parents. Before the introduction of special education programs in Japan, this was a choice made by the family to assure that a blind daughter could contribute to the household. Adopting the role of a medium was seen as an acceptable means for blind women to contribute to their local village and household, and avoid becoming a financial burden to their families.

Training for itako was often paid for with contributions from villagers, rather than the family. Common aspects of initiation practices for these women were seen among those training in Yamagata, Aomori, and Miyagi prefectures in the 1920s and 1930s. They are trained in various practices, including memorization of Shinto and Buddhist prayers and sutras. Training typically involved cold-water purifying baths (水垢離, mizugori), which in its most extreme form can involve complete, sustained drenching by ice-cold water for a period of several days. These rituals are observed by the community, which prays for a fast resolution through the early arrival of a marrying deity.

Apprenticeship typically lasts three years, and involves heavy rote memorization and feats of physical purification. During this time, the itako-in-training is essentially adopted by a practicing shaman, and performs household work for the family.

=== Initiation ceremony ===
Ahead of the initiation ceremony, itako dress in a white kimono for several days, similar to a burial gown. She is not permitted to consume grain, salt, or meat, and must avoid artificial heat for three weeks before the ceremony. The lead-up to the ceremony had been described as incorporating "sleeplessness, semi-starvation and intense cold."

This process usually leads to a loss of consciousness, which is described as the moment in which Fudo Myoo, or Nittensama, or some other deity, has taken possession of the itako's body. In some cases, the itako must collapse while naming the spirit. In other cases, the names of various deities are written and scattered, while the itako sweeps over them with a brush until one of them is caught, which denotes the name of the possessing spirit.

At this point, a wedding ceremony, kamizukeshiki, is performed as an initiation. The itako trainee is dressed in a red wedding dress, and red rice and fish are consumed to celebrate her marriage to the spirit. It is suggested that the ceremony signals the death of the itako's life as a burden and her rebirth as a contributing member of the community.

== Contemporary itako ==
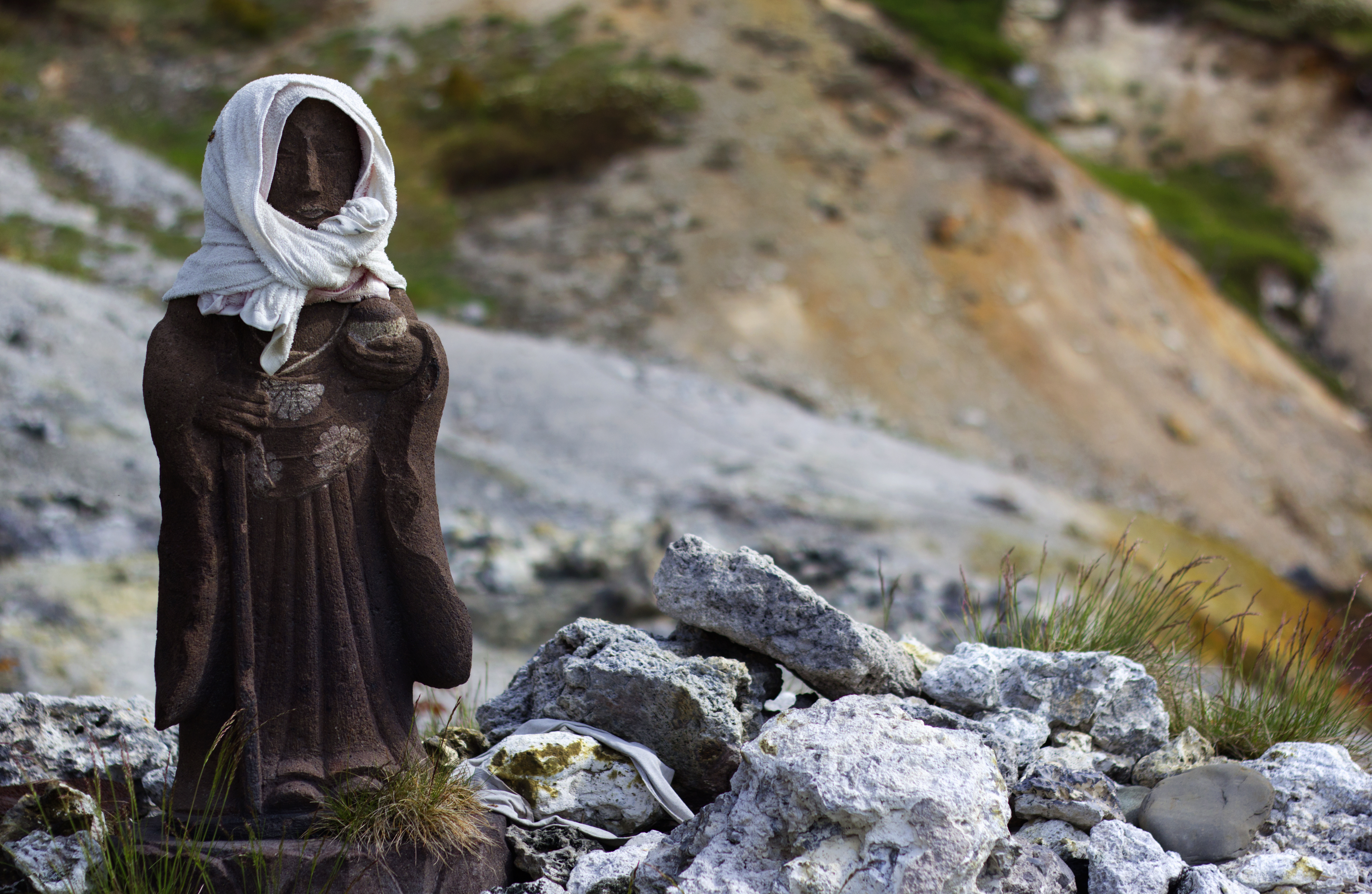
A statue of Jizo at Osorezan

In contemporary Japan, itako are on the decline. In 2009, less than 20 remained, all over the age of 40. Itako are increasingly viewed with skepticism and disdain, and contemporary education standards have all but eradicated the need for specialized training for the blind.

An annual festival is held on Mt. Osore beside the Entsuji Buddhist temple, which hangs signs disavowing any connection to the itako. The festival is held July 20–24, coinciding with the Obon holiday, which is the traditional day on which spirits of the dead return. They also attend the summer festival at Kawakura Sainokawara. Despite the disavowal of many religious organizations and temples in Japan, both events have become tourist attractions that attract crowds of hundreds. The local government includes the image of an itako in its tourist brochures, and attempted to fund a permanent itako position in the nearby temple to encourage sustained tourism throughout the year.

Itako, though few in number, have formed an association, the itako-ko and do occasionally work with Buddhist temples, usually providing support for funerals.

== See also ==
- Miko
- Onmyōdō
