= Shaman King (2021 TV series) =

2021 TV adaption of Shaman King

- Cover of the first Blu-ray and DVD boxset release of the series.
- No. of episodes: 52

Release
- Original network: TXN (TV Tokyo)
- Original release: April 1, 2021 – April 21, 2022

Series chronology
- ← Previous; N/A Next → Flowers

The 2021 Shaman King anime series (stylized as SHAMAN KING) is based on the manga series of the same name written and illustrated by Hiroyuki Takei. At Otakon 2015, former Madhouse president and then MAPPA president, Masao Maruyama, expressed his desire to work on a reboot of Shaman King. In February 2017, while answering a fan's question, Takei revealed on his official Twitter that he received an offer for an anime reboot of Shaman King, but he turned the offer down because he was told that the new anime would not be able to use the first anime's voice actors and soundtrack music, although Takei hoped for another chance in the future. In June 2020, a new anime television series was announced that would adapt the 35 volumes of the new complete manga edition.

The anime is produced by Bridge and directed by Joji Furuta, with series composition by Shōji Yonemura, character designs by Satohiko Sano and music composed by Yuki Hayashi. It aired from April 1, 2021, to April 21, 2022, on TV Tokyo and various other TX Network stations. Netflix acquired global streaming rights to the series and released the first cour consisting of 13 episodes, outside Japan on August 9, 2021. The series features several returning cast members from the 2001 anime series in both the Japanese and the English dub.

As with the 2001 anime series, Megumi Hayashibara the voice actress for Anna, performs the opening and ending theme songs in the 2021 series. The first opening theme is "Soul salvation" and the first ending theme is "#Boku no Yubisaki" (#ボクノユビサキ; "My Fingertip"), both performed by Hayashibara. "Soul salvation" would be used for a montage in the final episode while "#Boku no Yubisaki" would be used over the credits of the penultimate episode. The second opening theme is "Get up! Shout!" by Tamao's voice actress Nana Mizuki, and the second ending theme is "Adieu" by Jeanne's voice actress Yui Horie. "Get up! Shout!" would not be used at the beginning of the final episode, instead being used over the credits while highlights of the series were shown. The third ending theme is "Hazuki" by saji. The fourth ending theme is "Courage Soul" by Yoh's voice actress Yōko Hikasa. Episode 5 featured the first opening theme from the 2001 anime series, "Over Soul", performed by Hayashibara, as an insert song. The ending theme of episode 33 is "Osorezan Revoir", also performed by Hayashibara.

At the end of the anime reboot's finale, it was announced that a sequel anime had been green-lit.

== Episodes ==
No.	Title	Directed by (Note: Information is taken from the ending credits of each episode.)	Written by	Storyboarded by	Original release date
1	"The Boy Who Dances with Ghosts"; Transliteration: "Yūrei to Odoru Otoko" (Japanese: 幽霊と踊る男)	Naoto Hashimoto	Shōji Yonemura	Joji Furuta	April 1, 2021
Hao Asakura, an ancient shaman who learned to reincarnate himself, is reborn in the present and escapes his family with the Spirit of Fire while leaving behind his twin brother Yoh. Years later, Tokyo high school student Manta Oyamada is late from school and decides to cut through a cemetery. There, he meets Yoh and panics after noticing several spirits around him. The next day, his classmates dismiss his claims as nonsense and Yoh himself, who just joined their class, denies everything. Manta returns to the cemetery, but the place has been taken over by a gang of hoodlums led by Ryunosuke Umemiya, who destroys a headstone belonging to legendary samurai Amidamaru. Manta accidentally makes his presence known and is beaten up by the gang. The next day, Yoh takes him back to the cemetery to avenge him and Amidamaru, who feels humiliated following the vandalism of his headstone. Manta is amazed to learn that Yoh is able to incorporate the spirit of Amidamaru and borrow his abilities, easily defeating Ryu. Yoh invites him to be his guardian spirit, but he refuses, claiming he has been waiting for a friend for the last 600 years. Yoh learns that the friend is Mosuke, a blacksmith who built Amidamaru's legendary sword Harusame and whose spirit hovers over the weapon, which is now at display in a museum. By incorporating him, Yoh is able to reconstruct the worn-out sword and Mosuke, finally at peace, leaves for the afterlife.
2	"Another Shaman"; Transliteration: "Mō Hitori no Shāman" (Japanese: もう一人のシャーマン)	Yoshitsugu Kimura	Shōji Yonemura	Joji Furuta	April 8, 2021
Yoh is challenged by Ren Tao, a Chinese shaman guarded by the spirit of Chinese general Bason who wishes to take Amidamaru. In the confrontation, Ren reveals one can make a Soul Possession stronger based on the shaman's mental will and nearly cuts Yoh's arm off with one hit. Yoh quickly learns how to unleash Amidamaru's full power as well and manages to defeat Ren. In the aftermath, a wounded Yoh reveals his desire to become the Shaman King, a title held by the winner of an upcoming competition. Shortly afterwards, his fiancée Anna Kyōyama comes to Tokyo.
3	"Anna and Tao Jun"; Transliteration: "Anna to Tao Jun" (Japanese: アンナと道 潤)	Fumio Itō	Shōji Yonemura	Kōji Yoshikawa	April 15, 2021
Anna forces Yoh to train to improve his physical state for the upcoming Shaman Fight that happens once every five centuries. While Anna's methods seem abusive, it comes in when Yoh is challenged by Ren's sister Jun Tao and her jiangshi Lee Pyron, a martial arts film star who was secretly killed by the Tao family. Unlike Yoh, Jun incorporates here guardian spirit in its own preserved corpse, controlling it with cards. Yoh proves unable to defeat the creature and blames the metal bar he improvised as a weapon. Manta flees the scene and takes a beating to steal Ryu's sword and give it to Yoh so he can fight properly. Yoh manages to remove Lee's sealing talisman, causing the enraged jiangshi to rampage before Anna summons the ghost of Lee's master Shamon to defeat and pacify him. Jun leaves Pyron behind, but he reaffirms his loyalty to her and they remain together.
4	"Happy Place"; Transliteration: "Besuto Pureisu" (Japanese: ベストプレイス)	Masahiro Takata	Shōji Yonemura	Akira Tsuchiya	April 22, 2021
While hanging out in an abandoned bowling alley which he attempts to turn into his new "special place", Ryu is possessed by Tokageroh, the ghost of a bandit seeking revenge on Amidamaru for killing him 600 years ago. He baits Yoh into a fight by stealing Harusame and kidnapping Manta. Forced to choose between letting Manta die, incapacitanting Ryu or destroying Harusame, Amidamaru goes for the latter. Refusing to give up, Tokaheroh threatens to kill Manta, but Ryu's friends rescue him, frustrated to see their leader acting like that. In a last attempt to hurt Amidamaru, he decides to kill Ryu himself, but Yoh offers his own body for him to do as he pleases. Tokageroh is touched by Yoh's selflessness and lets go of his hatred.
5	"Over Soul"; Transliteration: "Ōbā Souru!" (Japanese: オーバーソウル！)	Kazuomi Koga	Shōji Yonemura	Joji Furuta	April 29, 2021
Yoh is summoned by Silva, a member of the Patch Tribe and one of the Shaman Fight overseers, who was sent by his superiors to test Yoh's worthiness to participate in the Shaman Fight. Yoh's abilities prove insufficient to face Silva until he notices Silva is not incorporating his guardian spirits, but they're actually emerging from objects around his body. Yoh gives it a try and discovers the Over Soul technique by channeling Amidamaru's soul through his sword. Yoh manages to land a hit on Silva and earns the right to enter the Shaman Fight, being awarded an oracle, an electronic device for official Shaman Fight communications. Yoh also learns that performing an Over Soul consumes "Furyoku"; one's "shamanic power".
6	"Yoh vs. Horohoro!"; Transliteration: "Yō Bāsasu Horohoro!" (Japanese: 葉VSホロホロ！)	Rokō Ogiwara	Shōji Yonemura	Takeshi Mori	May 6, 2021
Yoh fights his first rival from the Shaman Fight, an Ainu shaman named Horohoro who seeks to create a vast fuki field for the koro-pok-guru which his spirit Kororo is a member of. Horo Horo uses his snowboard as a medium and surprises Yoh with several ice/snow-based attacks, but Yoh emerges victorious. Nevertheless, the two become friends and celebrate together at Yoh's house.
7	"A Form of Courage"; Transliteration: "Sonna Yūki" (Japanese: そんな勇気)	Yūki Morita	Jin Tanaka	Joji Furuta	May 13, 2021
Silva invites Anna for dinner and recommends her to have Yoh forfeit his second match due to his adversary being too dangerous, having killed his first opponent. The challenger is Johann Faust VIII, a necromancer and a descendant of Faust. Curious about Manta's height, Faust captures him and performs surgery on him while he's awake, terrorizing him and infuriating Yoh. As a necromancer, Faust takes advantage of the cemetery that was chosen as the match location and sends endless hordes of skeletons against Yoh, who wastes lots of furyoku in the process. When Yoh proves stronger than he anticipated, Faust reveals his guardian spirit: Eliza, his own deceased wife. They fell in love after he spent 20 years searching for a cure for her disease, but soon after they married and opened a clinic, she was murdered. Distraught, he decided to join the Shaman Fight in the hopes of resurrecting her. Faust incorporates Eliza into her own skeleton and the resulting Over Soul easily overwhelms Yoh, even more after he provokes him by calling her a "doll". Yoh eventually runs out of Fuyoku, effectively losing the match, but a deranged Faust assembles countless bones to create a giant skeleton in an attempt to have Yoh killed. Tao Ren emerges and takes him down with one hit, announcing he doesn't want Yoh to die now because he is his next opponent and wants to kill Yoh himself.
8	"Progress"; Transliteration: "Shinka" (Japanese: 進化)	Shōtarō Kitamura	Fumihiko Shimo	Shōtarō Kitamura	May 20, 2021
In an attempt to protect Manta, Yoh breaks their friendship and goes back to his hometown, where his grandfather takes him to a cave where he'll spent the next seven days deprived of his senses in order to become stronger. Meanwhile, Manta's father Mansumi, the CEO of a large corporation, fobids his son from talking to Yoh again and sends him to the USA to keep him out of trouble. However, he and Ryu meet by chance in the aorport and decide to follow Yoh. Tamao Tamamura, an apprentice of theAsakura family, is tricked by her own spirits Ponchi and Konchi into believing the two are threats. Anna stops Tamao and disciplines Ponchi and Konchi. Yoh emerges safe and sound from the cave and is testged by his grandfather, revealing a new, stronger Over Soul form.
9	"Yoh vs. Ren: Again!"; Transliteration: "Yō Bāsasu Ren Futatabi!" (Japanese: 葉VS蓮 再び！)	Yoshitsugu Kimura	Shōji Yonemura	Takeshi Mori	May 27, 2021
Yoh and Ren have their rematch with the former's more powerful Oversoul being able to rival the latter's. Although Ren is still superior than his enemy, Yoh's calm demeanor causes him to lose powers at the same time. The duel eventually ends with a tie that secures both a spot in the next stage. Meanwhile, Jun asks her father, who is revealed to be an enormous man, to release Ren from the family's obligations, claiming Yoh was able to sensibilize both siblings and that Ren is frustrated deep inside.
10	"Night in the Flame"; Transliteration: "En no Yoru" (Japanese: 炎の夜)	Masahiro Okamura	Jin Tanaka	Takeshi Mori	June 3, 2021
Ren reluctantly celebrates his qualification to the next stage of the Shaman Fight with Yoh and Horohoro. Ren leaves for China, where he intends to confront his father and end his family's cycle of hatred. Meanwhile, Yoh and Tamao are attacked by a pair of priest rock and roll musicians who attempt to send Amidamaru, Ponchi and Konchi to the afterlife. They are saved by Ryu, who is now revealed as a capable shaman who wields his wooden sword and is guarded by Tokageroh. The two reveal that they have been sent by someone named "Hao". He is later seen sitting next to a large creature briefly commenting on Yoh and his friends.
11	"A Tale of Two Men"; Transliteration: "Otoko Futari" (Japanese: 男二人)	Takeshi Tomita	Fumihiko Shimo	Masami Shimoda	June 10, 2021
After fighting an army of jiangshi, Ren confronts his father Tao En and is easily defeated and consequently imprisoned with his sister. Bason manages to escape and begs Yog for help. Yoh, Horo Horo, Ryu and Manta go in Ren's aid and break into the family's tower. Horo Horo and Ryu face against En's five elite-level, mutated jiangshi, while Yoh goes set Ren and Jun free.
12	"Ren vs. En: The End of the Tao"; Transliteration: "Ren Tai En Tao no Shūen" (Japanese: 蓮VS円 道の終焉)	Akihiro Nagao	Shōji Yonemura	Masaki Ōzora	June 17, 2021
Horo Horo and Ryu take out four of the five jiangshi, but are defeated by their leader, who also makes short work of Yoh and Ren. After Manta and Jun deduce from his moves that he is actually Pyron's master Shamon, the pupil steps in and defeats him. Then, Ren goes face his father once and for all and his companions are struck with awe by his size, becoming even more shocked after he easily fixes two arms that Horo Horo and Ryu successfully severe. Unable to hit him, to which En responds by saying he is hesitant and therefore will fail, Ren eventually admits he's been week, but that his newly made friends have helped him acquire a new kind of strength. Frustrated with his son's change, En hesitates as well and his enormous body, revealed to be an Over Soul that he kept for decades, fades and reveals him as a normal-sized man. En explains he can't understand Ren's friendship because he grew unable to trust other humans and reveals his guardian spirits are countless souls belonging to his ancestors of over 2,000 years. En still attempts to fight, but Ren's mother and grandfather intervene and tell him he's lost already. Ren's family and friends share a peaceful dinner and Ren's grandfather explains the family's history and the reasoning behind their actions. In the morning after, everyone leaves and En entrusts his son with the Tao family's sword.
13	"And Hao!"; Transliteration: "Soshite Hao!" (Japanese: そしてハオ！)	Haru Shinomiya	Shōji Yonemura	Joji Furuta	June 24, 2021
Yoh, Horohoro and Ryu spend some time with their loved ones before leaving for a probable one-way trip to the next stage of the Shaman Fight. Following instructions received via oracles, the trio head to a local military base where Ren joins them and from which the Patches' custom airplane will take participants to the USA, where the next stage will take place. Before the plane departs, Hao emerges and provokes them, easily taking out everyone except for Yoh, towards whom he takes a liking. Later, as they fly over American territory, the Patches' leader Goldva announces the airplane is actually an Over Soul which will soon vanish, and that surviving the fall is their next test. She also instructs them to look for the Patch Village, where the tournament will resume. Yoh's group survives by using their combined furyoku to alleviate the fall and soon they start looking for the village. Eventually, they are approached by Lilirara, a member of the Seminoa tribe who warns them against participating in the Shaman Fight. With the help of her guardian spirits, who were also Seminoa, she puts the group through their memories of the previous Shaman Fight 500 years earlier. The group spots Hao's previous incarnation, in which he was a Patch visibly similar to Silva and already commanded the Spirit of Fire. Lilirara explains the Shaman Fight is nothing but an "evil plan" by the Patches to create a shaman-ruled world and that her life's purpose is to convince as many shamans as possible to abandon it. After Horo Horo reveals his dream of creating a fuki field, Lilirara laughs and befriends them. She allows them to sleep at her place and gives them instructions to reach the Patch Village. After they leave, Hao emerges and burns both her body and her soul, claiming she has interfered too much in his plans.
14	"Lyserg the Avenger"; Transliteration: "Rizerugu Ribenjā" (Japanese: リゼルグ・リベンジャー)	Rokō Ogiwara	Jin Tanaka	Takeshi Mori	July 1, 2021
The group is approached by English shaman Lyserg Diethel, a dowser who wields a pendulum and is guarded by the fairy spirit Morphine. He claims to be looking for "strong allies" and challenges them, easily defeating Ren and Horo Horo with his Over Soul, which turns his pendulum into a rope dart that follows enemies relentlessly. Yoh, however, quickly destroys his weapon. Amazed by his power, Lyserg replaces his broken glass pendulum with a crystal one and generates a replica of the Big Ben with which he attempts to crush Yoh, but loses again. Yoh calms him down and invites him to tell his story. In flashbacks, it is revealed that Lyserg was born to a Sherlock Holmes-like shaman detective who trained him since a young age to be a skillful shaman and detective, as well. For his 6th birthday, his father hid a gift somewhere in London and tasked him with finding it. Lyserg finally locates the gift, his first pendulum, inside the Big Ben and rushes back home to celebrate, only to find it in flames with his dead parents inside. Hao, the killer, leaves and dismisses him as weak, explaining Lyserg's quest for allies and vengeance. Despite his acts, Lyserg is still welcomed by them to continue their journey in America. Meanwhile, in Izumo, Anna is summoned by Yoh's grandfather to enter a forbidden room and learn "the truth behind the Asakura family" and the "great onmyōji Hao Asakura".
15	"When the Pieces Come Together"; Transliteration: "Haguruma no Kamiau Toki" (Japanese: 歯車のかみあう時)	Satoshi Saga	Fumihiko Shimo	Takeshi Mori	July 8, 2021
Yoh's grandfather Yohmei explains that 1,000 years ago, Hao became a powerful shaman and earned the trust of the emperor of Japan, elevating the Asakura family to a noble status. However, he eventually decided to turn against humanity and mastered more advanced shaman techniques, allowing him to even manipulate death and resurrection. Yohmei says the room contains a sealed book with Hao's teachings from 1,000 years before, and that reading its contents may bring them closer to his power level. However, removing the seal will also set free Zenki and Goki, Hao's two loyal demon shikigamis. Tamao, who secretly followed them, accidentally breaks the seal and the demons emerge, but are quickly tamed by Anna, who learns how to control them with her 1080 prayer beads which she learned to use as part of her Itako training. Yohmei tasks Anna with delivering the book, titled Chō-Senjiryakketsu, to Yoh. In the United States, Hao bleeds as a result of his shikigami being defeated, but confesses himself excited to see what's to come. Meanwhile, Horohoro expresses admiration for Morphine and Kororo secretly leaves out of jealousy. Horohoro doesn't realize it until attempting a dangerous snowboard move that would require her assistance and ending up severely wounded. Bluebell Bloch, a local park ranger, rescues and treats him in her cabin. She reveals her father was a ranger too, and that years ago they rescued a large bear, which they named Apollo, who was hurt by hunters, and is therefore resentful of humans. Horohoro tries to reason with the animal, but is attacked nonetheless. He then explains Apollo feels lost because he is hunted by humans and at the same time rejected by his own due to the "human smell" that Bluebell left on him. He then successfully calms the bear down, only to see it getting killed by a trio of hunters. An angry Horohoro orders them to take the carcass with them, but after they refuse, he becomes even more infuriated that Apollo died for nothing and fights them off before returning to his friends.
16	"Enter the Ultra-Pompandour"; Transliteration: "Urutora Rīzento ni Yoroshiku" (Japanese: ウルトラリーゼントによろしく)	Masahiro Takata	Joji Furuta	Kentarō Fujita	July 15, 2021
Yoh and company arrive at the tourist old town of Mesa Verdede, from which they can enter the Patch Village through some abandoned ruins inside a large cave. However, a group of Hao's followers intercept them and announce they've been tasked by their master to put Yoh through a "test" by killing his four companions. One of them, Boris, introduces himself as a vampire and bites Lyserg, causing him to behave like a vampire, too. Meanwhile, he fights Ryu. The group then begin to deduce how Boris's powers work: his guardian spirits include a number of bats and a vampire hunter named Blaumro, who hunted and killed Boris's own family before being tortured, brainwashed and killed to serve him with Hao's help. Blaumro possesses people bitten by Boris, which is how he manages to "turn" them into vampires.
17	"Guns of the Angels"; Transliteration: "Tenshi no Pisutoru" (Japanese: 天使のピストル)	Shōtarō Kitamura	Jin Tanaka	Shōtarō Kitamura	July 22, 2021
In flashbacks, it is revealed that Ryu begged Yohmei to train him, but he refused in order to spare him from the "Asakura war". Yoh's father Mikihisha, however, convinced him to give Ryu a chance. Yohmei then sent Ryu on a journey up the Hii River to the top of Mount Sentsū, where he had a chance to face the legendary Yamata no Orochi. Back to the present, Ryu unleashes a new power acquired from his training and reveals his new Over Soul, Yamata no Orochi, with which he beats Boris. Yoh attempts to question Boris about Hao, but he is suddenly executed by a giant angel wielding a sword. A team of white-dressed, gun-wielding shamans emerge and introduce themselves as the X-Laws, sworn enemies of Hao's group. Yoh's group reluctantly follow them into the caves, but they are intercepted again by the same Hao's followers as before. The X-Laws quickly subdue one of them, but Yoh prevents them from performing another execution, explaining that it'd be as evil as Hao. Marco, their leader, takes offense, attacks Yoh and breaks Harusame in two with just one hit, but spares him out of admiration for his strong defense of his views. Meanwhile, Anna and Manta arrive in Mesa Verdede to deliver the Chō-Senjiryakketsu to Yoh, but are intercepted by Hao, who offers to guide them.
18	"Great Spirits and My Team"; Transliteration: "Gurēto Supirittsu Soshite Mai Chīmu" (Japanese: グレート・スピリッツ そしてマイチーム)	Takahiro Tanaka	Shōji Yonemura	Takeshi Mori	August 12, 2021
Anna is confronted by Hao who urges her to use the spells in increase Yoh's power so he can be in proper form to "help" him later. Meanwhile, Yoh's group finally reaches the Patch Village upon having hallucinations with the Great Spirit, which is revealed to be a giant cone of light in the middle of the village. Yoh awakens and is greeted by Silva, who explains every shaman who enters the village is exposed to the 4,6 billion years of memories of the Earth all at once, causing most to faint and some to even lose their minds. With the help of Mikihisa, Anna, Tamao and Manta make it to the village, as well, and reunite with Yoh. As she delivers the Chō-Senjiryakketsu, the group meets a shaman named Joco, who dreams of being a comedian and is guarded by Mick, the spirit of a jaguar. Joco explains this phase of the Shaman Fight will require teams composed of three members. He also explains there are three main factions led by God-level shamans: Hao's group, the X-Laws and a group named Gandhira. Also according to him, most shamans in the village are aligned to one of these groups. While initially annoyed by his jokes, Ren decides to recruit him and Horohoro to his team, proposing that Yoh stays with Ryu and Lyserg. Later, Manta goes for a walk and finds Faust on a wheelchair.
19	"Jaguar"; Transliteration: "Kuroi Jagā" (Japanese: 黒いジャガー)	Yoshitsugu Kimura	Fumihiko Shimo	Masaki Ōzora	August 19, 2021
Faust takes Manta back to Yoh, asks for a spot in his group and says all he wants is to be with Eliza. Ryu refuses, claiming the spot is already taken by Lyserg, but Anna expresses interest in his power, which she witnessed during his fight with Yoh, besides intending to recruit him as the doctor of her future spa complex. Later, she is seen delivering the Chō-Senjiryakketsu to Silva while wondering why he is interested in that. Later, all 63 fighters and their supporters are taken to an uninhabited island off the coast of Japan, where the finals will take place. The teams and brackets are announced and Ren's team "The Ren" will face Team Earth, composed of three followers of Hao: Peyote Diaz and the duo Bo'z. Ren allows Joco to face the pair, assuming them to be weaker than Peyote, and the newcomer indeed makes short work of them. However, they keep fighting back despite taking damage, and Peyote eventually reveals that he is simply controlling them with some of his guardian spirits, who were all mariachi musicians known more for their violence than for their artistry. Observing Joco's techniques, Anna explains he mixes incorporation with Over Soul and basically uses his own body as a medium for Mick.
20	"Joco's Christmas"; Transliteration: "Chokorabu no Kurisumasu" (Japanese: チョコラブのクリスマス)	Takuma Suzuki; Yūto Umino	Joji Furuta	Takeshi Mori	August 26, 2021
As the battle rages on, Chocolove recalls his childhood. It is revealed that, as a kid, a robber broke into his house and murdered his parents on Christmas Day. After spending time in several different orphanages, he joined a gang and became violent, to the point of executing a father on Christmas Day. Soon after the crime, he was approached by an old man from the Amazon who takes him as a protégé to whom he intends to pass on the spirit of Mick, the Jaguar, and teaches him to laugh his violence away. Some time later, the man is murdered by Joco's former gang, who want their member back. Although infuriated, Joco refuses to go back to violence and not only refrains from retaliating but also leads his friends out of violence. Back to the fight, he uses his furyoku to generate a joke and cause Peyote's spirits to laugh, weakening them and allowing Ren to end the match with one hit. At the stands, Hao comments that the whole tournament is just a waste of time, but that it does at least provide some entertainment. Lyserg is seen with Marco wearing his new X-Laws uniform as an iron maiden is hoisted out of the sea.
21	"Iron Maiden Jeanne"; Transliteration: "Aian Meiden Jannu" (Japanese: アイアンメイデン・ジャンヌ)	Haru Shinomiya	Shōji Yonemura	Takeshi Mori	September 2, 2021
The next match of the Shaman Fight is set and will have Team X-Laws I, composed of Marco, Lyserg and their leader, who's inside an iron maiden, facing Team Niles, a group of Egyptian Shamans lead by Anatel, a descendant of the pharaohs. The X-Laws leader orders Lyserg to fight, and it takes him but seconds to coldly subdue the three. However, after they insist on fighting back, he decides to execute them, but his pendulum stops mere centimeters from Anatel's head. Lyserg blames Morphine, and the leader physically punishes him, while Marco states that his guardian spirit hesitated because his heart is still in doubt. The leader decides to take matters into her own hands and finally reveals herself, shocking the whole stadium once they realize she is just a young girl, called "Iron Maiden" Jeanne. She explains that she subjected herself to a constant state of torture in order to atone for everyone's sins and that laws are nothing but a way to warrant that nature continues its course of disposing of those who are disloyal and rebellious, but that humanity has become "too complex". She then reveals her guardian spirit, Shamash. With Over Souls that reproduce medieval instruments of torture, she quickly captures and executes each member after they refuse to "atone" and "repent" before locking herself back in her iron maiden.
22	"I'll Go Anywhere with you" Transliteration: "Anata to Nara Doko Made mo" (Japanese: あなたとならどこまでも)	Yūki Morita	Jin Tanaka	Takeshi Mori	September 9, 2021
Yoh, Ryu and Faust learn the contents of the Chō-Senjiryakketsu and Yoh becomes cocky over his new powers, claiming at a local restaurant that he will defeat their next opponents, the Icemen Team, with one attack. After Yoh leaves the place, the opponents, composed of a Russian woman, an Irish man and an Icelandic man guarded by deities of different mythologies from their homelands, take offense and Team The Ren tries to calm them down, only to have a taste of their power that nearly gets Joco killed. During the match, Yoh reveals his and Amidamaru's powers have evolved enough to create a giant Oversoul named Spirit of Sword, which results from a combination of his rebuilt Harusame with the Asakura family's treasured stone sword Futunomitama no Turugi. Hao explains that although made of stone, the sword can prove extremely powerful in the hands of a capable shaman due to its accumulated spiritual history. However, Yoh finds this new form tiring and quickly dismantles it. As soon as the match officially starts, the Icemen attack Faust, assuming him to be the weakest member, but he walks out of his destroyed wheelchair. He reveals that he sacrificed his own legs to lend them to Eliza, whose skeleton was damaged in the preliminary fight with Yoh. However, he was able to improvise new legs for him using the skeleton of their late dog Frankensteiny. Faust then tells how Anna helped bring the full soul of Eliza from the afterlife, which essentially ended his life purpose. However, he found a new meaning when Anna herself invited him to provide medical services for her future hot springs facility and assist Yoh in the Shaman Fight. He then reveals his new Over Soul Mephisto-E, a gigantic, mutated version of Eliza with wings and weaponized medical instruments in her hands.
23	"The Power of Yoh"; Transliteration: "Yō Ryoku" (Japanese: 葉力)	Keisuke Nishijima	Fumihiko Shimo	Takeshi Mori	September 16, 2021
Faust's new Over Soul impresses the Icemen, who decide to attack Yoh, instead. Ryu blocks the attack and is frozen alive, but quickly melts the ice away, shocking the opponents. He explains his determination to protect and assist Yoh as the future Shaman King, who will create a better world for everyone. He then also reveals his new Over Soul, Yamata no Orochi Go, a gigantic, motorized eight-headed snake. Frustrated that the harsh training that they went through their whole lives wasn't enough to match Yoh's group's power level, the Icemen leader Pino tries to attacks Yoh again, but he effortlessly has the ice dodge him. Anna explains that Yoh's furyoku simply bent and dodged the Icemen's, because Yoh is able to absorb everything the present brings to him while the Icemen take deep pride in their past, but such pride is now collapsing. Accepting their probable defeat, Pino encourages his teammates to help him with one final combined attack, which Yoh successfully counters with the Spirit of Sword. Later, both teams, Joco and Horohoro have a friendly meal in which Pino reveals himself happy to see his teammates having a light moment for a break. Ren, who left the stadium earlier claiming the outcome would be "obvious", is concerned with Yoh's sudden power increase and is approached by Hao, who offers to teach him the same techniques if he joins his faction. Ren refuses and attacks him, only to have his guandao instantly burnt, although no flames were visible. Bason and Ren discuss how the attack happened and Ren guesses that Hao's medium must be something invisible. Yoh goes meet Lyserg by the X-Laws' ship.
24	"Trust No One"; Transliteration: "Seigi ni Ichiban Hitsuyō na Mono" (Japanese: 正義に一番必要なもの)	Rokō Ogiwara	Joji Furuta	Takeshi Mori	September 23, 2021
Yoh and Lyserg have a friendly, brief conversation, but Marco emerges and punishes Lyserg for sneaking out of the ship. The rest of the X-Laws join the comotion and Jeanne invites Yoh into the faction. He refuses, upsets her and Marco attempts to attack him in retaliation, but Yoh successfully stops him. Jeanne lets him go but promises to face him as an enemy next time. Back in the ship, Marco continues to punish Lyserg and reminds him that one of their teams, X-Laws III, will face Hao's team, Team Star, which the whole group sees as an "opportunity" to learn more about Hao's power despite the probable deaths of the three members. The next day, Hao kills them one by one with just one hit each, but they remain unmoved by each death, instead focusing on Hao's techniques to try and deduce their nature. In his dying breath, Venstar says he figured "Hao's secret", and Hao himself calmly admits he uses air as a medium for his Over Soul, since fire needs oxygen to burn, confirming a theory Ren developed since their encounter in the previous episode. Venstar then detonates a powerful grenade, with the blast contained by a shield the Patches designed to keep the audience from interfering with the fights, hoping to burn all the oxygen and render Hao vulnerable. However, he emerges safe and sound as Yoh reveals to his friends that he is a member of the Asakura family.
25	"The Great Onmyoji, Hao Asakura"; Transliteration: "Dai Onmyōji Asakura Hao" (Japanese: 大陰陽師 麻倉葉王)	Yoshitsugu Kimura	Shōji Yonemura	Joji Furuta	September 30, 2021
Hao survives the blast by converting the Spirit of Fire into water. Mikihisha and Goldva explain that he mastered the five fundamental elements of nature: wood, fire, earth, metal and water, allowing him to manipulate them at will. Hao acknowledges X-Laws III's determination and decides to "reward" them by having the Spirit of Fire eat their souls. Goldva explains that the five elemental spirits, including the Spirit of Fire, came from the Great Spirit and became the essence of their respective elements, while the Spirit of Fire grows ever stronger with each soul it consumes. Goldva says that although Hao stole his spirit from the Patches and massacred their tribe 500 years ago, they must still just oversee the Shaman Fight until its conclusion. Meanwhile, Yoh explains to his friends that his family has been at war with Hao for 1,000 years and that he never told them anything in order to spare them from the family's internal affairs. Later, he also reveals that Hao is his twin, older brother. Silva collects video evidence of Hao's techniques that Radim, the Shaman Fight referee and narrator, secretly filmed for him. He then says it is his duty as a descendant of Hao's previous incarnation to stop him at all costs. His colleagues Magna and Nichrom, who overheard the conversation, agree to report him for his "betrayal". In flashbacks, Yoh's parents celebrate their upcoming twin children, but Yohmei predicts one of them will be Hao. Unable to identify which of them is evil, the family makes the difficult decision of sacrificing both children as soon as they are born. However, Hao is already born sentient, powerful and guarded by an infant version of the Spirit of Fire, which allows him to easily escape, not before promising to collect his "other half" when appropriate. Happy that the innocent child was spared, Yohmei promises to train him to beat Hao in the future.
26	"Mikihisa Typhoon"; Transliteration: "Mikihisa Taifūn" (Japanese: 幹久タイフーン)	Masakazu Yoshimoto	Jin Tanaka	Masaki Ōzora	October 7, 2021
The Asakura and the Tao families meet to discuss the future of their children. Mikihisha offers to teach Ren the contents of the Chō-Senjiryakketsu, but En questions its powers and challenges him for a fight. Later, he is seen defeated and badly injured while Mikihisha stands safe and well. Meanwhile, Yoh confirms that he is Hao's twin and that his brother has a furyoku level of over 1,250,000, which he deems unattainable through mere effort and unmatchable even if combining every other participant. Nichrom and Magna report Silva's actions to Hao and he says he will simply allow "nature to run its course" while claiming the "real battle" is about to begin. Later, Mikihisha approaches Team The Ren, promising them to teach the book's techniques. However, Ren refuses such idea and battles him instead. He is easily overpowered, even after using his new Hōraiken sword and revealing his new Over Soul. Meanwhile, in another location, Yoh explains that his father grew stronger by climbing mountains alone and with no equipment, including the Everest. As Horohoro prepares to help his teammate, Ren smiles and says it's not his turn yet.
27	"Farewell Forever"; Transliteration: "Eien ni Sayonara" (Japanese: 永遠にサヨナラ)	Shōtarō Kitamura	Fumihiko Shimo	Shōtarō Kitamura	October 14, 2021
Ren finally manages to land a hit on Mikihisha, but loses anyway. Mikihisha then prepares them some food and Ren asks why are their families relying on children to save the world when they are already quite powerful themselves. Mikihisha replies that as adults, they have identified their limits, but children like them are still capable of growing with no barriers in sight. Soon, their meal is interrupted by Nichrom and Magna, who reveal their loyalty to Hao. Mikihisha's oracle bell rings, revealing him as a Shaman Fight participant, and he is allowed to leave to join his two teammates, a pair of unknown children, who are being targeted by another group of Hao's followers, Team Hanagumi, as they speak. Peyote, Mohamed Tabarsi and Hang Zang-Ching join the commotion and fight Ren. Although Ren initially proves himself superior, he loses focus when Nichrom reveals to be the younger brother of Chrom, the Patch official murdered by him in the Shaman Fight admission test. He tells Ren there are no hard feelings and that his brother died because he was "a loser" as a distracted Ren receives a fatal wound by Peyotte's gigantic Over Soul. The Mexican shaman explains that despite the outcome of their official match in the Shaman Fight, he never really lost to them simply because he is still alive. Horohoro and Joco prepare to protect Ren and save themselves, but are outnumbered and overpowered by the enemies.
28	"Yoh's Decision"; Transliteration: "Yō no Kimeta Koto" (Japanese: 葉の決めた事)	Masahiro Takata	Joji Furuta	Takeshi Mori	October 21, 2021
Horo Horo and Joco learn that their Furyoku is at just about 2,000 each, and the frustration leads makes them even more vulnerable to the enemies, but Yoh, having been warned by Silva in the previous episode, arrives at the scene and orders Hao's followers to leave. Faust says Ren is beyond salvation via medical treatment and Yoh makes a deal with the X-Laws, forfeiting the Shaman Fight in exchange for Jeanne saving Ren. Meanwhile, Jun stands her ground against Kanna Bismarch, the leader of Team Hanagumi, while the stadium waits for Mikihisha's team to show up for the match.
29	"Emeth"; Transliteration: "Emeto" (Japanese: emeth)	Aya Kobayashi	Jin Tanaka	Takeshi Mori	October 28, 2021
Anna takes Mikihisa's companions to the match while Tamao and Jun keep fighting Team Hanagumi. The match goes back and forth, but Hao's girls emerge victorious. One of them, Marion, is fed up with their rivals' attitude and tries to kill them, but Mikihisa shows up, lectures them and sends them off. He also lectures Jun and Tamao for risking their lifes like that when there was no one left to protect at the scene. Meanwhile, Anna takes the siblings to their match and learns that they were not shamans until the murder of their father on Christmas Day, after which the girl became unresponsive and the boy learned about the Golem, a shamanic android that his father built. According to Mikihisa, the Golem possesses such power that, had it been activated when Team Hanagumi fought the girls, everyone at the scene would be dead.
30	"Mt. Osore Le Voile"; Transliteration: "Osorezan Ru Vowāru An" (Japanese: 恐山ル・ヴォワール un1)	Yūki Shīna	Shōji Yonemura	Joji Furuta	November 4, 2021
Mikihisa wins his match. Yoh confirms he is leaving the fight, much to Marco's disgust. Manta explains that as much as Yoh wanted to win the tournament, he wouldn't be able to look up to Yoh the same way as before had he turned his back on his own friend. Anna arrives at the place, but only Yoh's oracle bell is left and she has a memory of when they first met. In flashbacks, it is revealed that, five years ago, when his family arranged his marriage with Anna, Yoh was approached by Matamune, the spirit of a cat who has been serving the Asakura family for around 1,000 years and who has spent some time traveling the world and studying. Together, they head to Northern Japan towards Mount Osore, where they'll meet Anna. Yoh and Anna have an awkward and intense first meeting by chance as Mikihisa explains to a younger Tamao that Anna potentially possesses a lot of power. After meeting Anna, Yoh is attacked by an oni, but is saved by Matamune, who uses his pipe to create an Over Soul of a sword.
31	"Mt. Osore Le Voile II"; Transliteration: "Osorezan Ru Vowāru Du" (Japanese: 恐山ル・ヴォワール deux2)	Fumio Maezono	Fumihiko Shimo	Takeshi Mori	November 11, 2021
Yoh is confused by Anna's coldness and aggressivity. Matamune explains that demons like omi are personifications of people's resentment and hatred. Anna meets Yoh in a local store and tells him that getting close to her "will only bring him unhappiness" and recommends him to ditch their marriage plans. Another demon emerges and Yoh sees it taking form out of her own body. As Yoh is hunted into another store, he notices the demon is able to cause physical damage, which is unusual for a spirit. The owner of the store, unable to see it, initially blames Yoh, but soon realizes the invisible force and lends Yoh his sword. Before Yoh has a chance to fight, the demon dissipates. Keiko and Matamune talk and it is revealed that he helped the Asakura family defeat Hao in the previous Shaman Fight 500 hundred years before, as he refers to Hao as his "master". In flashbacks, Hao's first version finds Matamune as a powerless stray cat and adopts him after noticing he can see spirits. Matamune explains that Hao is compassionate and empathetic and was able to sense other people's hearts and souls, but that his huge furyoku drove him mad. Keiko deduces he came back in order to prevent Anna, who is revealed to possess the same power, from suffering the same fate.
32	"Mt. Osore Le Voile III"; Transliteration: "Osorezan Ru Vowāru Torowa" (Japanese: 恐山ル・ヴォワール trois3)	Shigeki Awai	Joji Furuta	Takeshi Mori	November 18, 2021
As Yoh and Anna grow closer, the former learns of the latter's powers involving reading memories. Yoh invites her to a New Year celebration in the local temple so they can make a wish to the gods. Keiko warns Matamune that the place will be full of people making selfish wishes and that this could disturb Anna beyond her limits and allow for a larger demon to emerge. Anna soon succumbs to the crowd's thoughts and a couple of demons appears. As she gives in to more negativity, a giant omi appears and quickly grows even larger by consuming other demons. Matamune catches up with them and fights the demon even at the risk of extinguishing his furyoku, which is revealed to have been a gift from Hao, but the demon, which is able to speak, kidnaps Anna and heads to Mount Osore, where he intends to use a vulnerable Anna as a bait for even more demons for him to eat. Yoh and Matamune chase after the demon with the help of the store owner from the previous episode, who meets Yoh by chance in the temple.
33	"Mt. Osore Le Voile IV"; Transliteration: "Osorezan Ru Vowāru Kyatoru" (Japanese: 恐山ル・ヴォワール quatre4)	Keisuke Nishijima	Shōji Yonemura	Joji Furuta	November 25, 2021
Yoh and Matamune reach the top of the mountain where they find an even larger demon and a deranged Anna. Yoh integrates Matamune's spirit with his necklace, creating a gigantic Over Soul of a katana. In flashbacks, Matamune explained to Yoh on the way to the mountain that doing so would exhaust his Furyoku and leave him unable to materialize a body, essentially sending him back to the Great Spirit. Yoh reluctantly agreed, with the distant hope of meeting him again if he becomes the Shaman King. The demon asks Anna for more power, but she confesses she fell in love with Yoh and is now letting go of her "child". The demon goes berserk, but Yoh heartfully takes him out with one hit. Afterwards, Yoh and Anna briefly bid farewell to each other.
34	"To Be King"; Transliteration: "Ōja ni Naru Hōhō" (Japanese: 王者になる方法)	Yoshitsugu Kimura	Jin Tanaka	Takeshi Mori	December 2, 2021
Back in the present, Anna forgives Yoh for abandoning the fight but reminds him they still have to beat Hao, who tells his gang that Yoh will come after him eventually and therefore his participation in the Shaman Fight in unimportant for him. Jeanne revives Ren, who dismisses the X-Laws' efforts to bring him back. They attack in retaliation, but Ren easily counters them all, since near-death experiences usually increase one's furyoku dramatically. Meanwhile, Horohoro still feels inferior after learning his power level and finds that the Icemen are being attacked by Bill Burton and Brocken Meyer, who were tasked with collecting their souls for Hao. Despite knowing he is too weak, Horohoro intervenes and all four are quickly defeated. Horohoro's father Lycan witnesses the fight from afar after being called by Pirika but refuses to intervene, claiming that the course of nature shall not be messed with and the strongest will always survive. He interrupts the fight to collect some parts from the Icemen's boat to improvise a vessel of his own, but when Bill tries to attack him, he easily defends himself with his guardian spirit Gororo, a giant koropokkuru. Kalim explains that although Lycan is also weak compared to Bill, Gororo is in turn a much stronger spirit, which compensates for the shaman's weakness. Horohoro then tries to fight Brocken by combining Kororo with the guardian spirits of the Icemen.
35	"Reunion"; Transliteration: "Saikai no Shiro Shōnen" (Japanese: 再会の白少年)	Rokō Ogiwara	Fumihiko Shimo	Kentarō Fujita; Masaki Ōzora	December 9, 2021
Horohoro beats Brocken, but lets both him and Bill live. While he wonders how will he take the passed out Icemen members to Faust, Bill wakes up, but Lyserg attacks him and collects the four shamans. Later, some Hao followers check on the injured Bill and Brocken explains it was one of the X-Laws' angels, but Peyote finds it strange that Bill was left alive. In flashbacks, Marco takes Lyserg to the X-Laws armory, where a small arsenal of weapons and mediums are kept along with Zelel, the eight archangel. Lyserg is then given the angel as his new guardian spirit. Meanwhile, Lyserg takes Horohoro to Yoh, who gathered his friends to announce something important regarding the Shaman Fight. Before he can speak, however, Peyote locates and attacks them. Faust takes them away with Mephisto-E while Ryu is left behind to fight him and Turbine. He loses and dies, but the Gandhara intervene, revive him and push Hao's followers away. Meanwhile, Mikihisa prepares food for Redseb and Seyrarm and both notice something involving the Golem. Joco goes meet his friends from the gang and finds them all murdered. The Golem emerges and the siblings reveal they are the children of the man Joco murdered in the past.
36	"Redseb and Seyrarm"; Transliteration: "Rudosebu to Seirāmu" (Japanese: ルドセブとセイラーム)	Yūki Morita	Joji Furuta	Takeshi Mori	December 16, 2021
Joco evades their attacks, takes down the Golem and heartfully apologizes for killing their father. They execute him anyway, claiming his words won't make them feel better. Meanwhile, a beaten Mikihisa sends his guardian spirits to go warn Anna and Yoh. The latter arrives and lectures the siblings on vengeance while Ryu takes Joco to the Gandhara in hopes of having him revived just like he was. Meanwhile, Manta and Anna calmly ride on Mikihisa's spirits as Anna explains Yoh is currently unable to defeat the Golem, but as long as he doesn't die, he needs to "take a beating" in order to "complete another cycle". Back to the fight, Yoh asks Redseb if Seyrarm seems better, but she remains apathetic. He then slowly manages to talk some sense into him, but he is seriously wounded by the Golem anyway in a surprise attack. Yoh and Redseb flee, but are soon located by the Golem. Hao and his followers arrive too and the tension escalates. Peyote announces that the Golem possesses a furyoku of 550,000 and Luchist explains that this is enabled by a "furyoku battery", allowing the siblings to control it despite having a combined furyoku of only 1,600. He then reveals that Seyrarm is possessed by the ghost of her own father. The Golem successfully lands a few hits on the Spirit of Fire, but Hao quickly has his spirit grab the machine. Yoh challenges him, but Hao's followers easily take him down and Hao wonders how does he want to face him if he can't even defeat his goons. Lyserg, Horohoro and Ren arrive and the tension escalates even further. Lyserg reveals he allowed Joco to be killed because he knows how the siblings feel, but is now determined to build more understanding among all parties involved. Meanwhile, Joco arrives in hell where he meets his old mentor, who promises him to guide him to "a powerful soul".
37	"Winds of Laughter"; Transliteration: "Warai no Kaze" (Japanese: 笑いの風)	Shōtarō Kitamura	Shōji Yonemura	Shōtarō Kitamura	December 23, 2021
Yoh forms his Spirit of Sword and Hao notices it was inspired by Matamune's Demon Slayer. Emotional with the memorizes of what he calls his "first and only friend ever", Hao simply leaves with his followers. Meanwhile, Anna tells Manta about Yoh and Matamune. Redseb tries to reason with his father, but he ignores his son and fires a beam straight at him, only to have it diverted by Joco, who was just brought back to life by Gandhara with a greatly increased power and a new guardian spirit, Pascual Abaj, an Olmec deity introduced to him by Orona. He forms a new Over Soul combining it with Mick and faces off against the Golem, but Anna intercepts the fight and claims the Golem, intending to use it in the fight against Hao. Later, Joco reveals to Yoh that he has deliberately gone blind in order to heighten his other senses and increase his furyoku and to understand the siblings. As he and the rest of Yoh's group have some fun, Seyrarm is seen smiling. Meanwhile, Opacho asks Hao why didn't he collect the Golem, and Hao explains that it is needed to increase Yoh's power. He then tasks her with a mission.
38	"Graduation"; Transliteration: "Sotsugyō" (Japanese: 卒業)	Masakazu Yoshimoto	Jin Tanaka	Takeshi Mori	January 6, 2022
39 shamans remain in the fight. Goldva orders two Patch officials to "deal" with Silva, who is revealed to have been incarcerated for trying to steal the remaining four elemental spirits. Meanwhile, Opacho comes to Yoh side to warn him that Hao will kill Redseb and his sister if he does not return to the Shaman Fight. Later, she informs Luchist that the task is fulfilled and he is seen undressed, revealing an X-Laws tattoo on his back before he says he will finally be able to talk to Marco. After being lectured by Amidamaru and Anna, Yoh decides to do what he wants. At night, he visits the X-Laws and announces his decision to return to the fight, which initiates a battle. Everyone is surprised when Marco becomes infuriated when Yoh suggests he is the actual head of the group, not Jeanne. Soon after, Luchist emerges and reveals that he founded the X-Laws and mentored Marco both in religion and in his high-end car dealership business in Sicily. After he easily takes out the entire X-Laws II team, Yoh recognizes he is much stronger than anyone there and wonders why he hasn't killed Marco yet, concluding that he is sparing his furyoku to kill Jeanne.
39	"The Summit"; Transliteration: "Samitto" (Japanese: サミット)	Haru Shinomiya	Fumihiko Shimo	Takeshi Mori	January 13, 2022
Luchist reveals that Jeanne is just an ordinary girl whom he and Marco found in an orphanage. Yoh devises a plan to use his father's guardian spirits to create copies of Jeanne and Shamash and provide the team with an opening to escape as Luchist attacks the fake targets. He deduces the plan, however, only to find out Shamash was real. Having consumed all his furyoku, he passes out, ashamed that he fell for Yoh's plan. Marco reveals that the X-Laws' angels' actual forms are of super cars and tells the story of his car dealership and an orphanage, both of which were destroyed by Hao, which sparked his hatred for the villain. Ashamed of having deceived Jeanne and his entire team, Marco attempts suicide, but Jeanne stops him and says even though she has learned the truth, she still embraces her destiny and sees him as her savior. Later, Yoh's group, Luchist, Opacho and the X-Laws have a peaceful meal together during which Yoh announces Hao as the future winner of the Shaman Fight, much to everyone's surprise. He then reveals his plan to defeat his brother: once he becomes Shaman King, he will have to undergo a deep state of sleep before he receives the power of the Great Spirit, during which time he will be vulnerable. However, they will have to face every Patch official before reaching Hao, since protecting the future Shaman King is their ultimate purpose. Luchist explains Hao is aware of the plan and has recruited his followers with this in mind. Anna shows them the tournament table and reminds them that Yoh's and Ren's teams will face each other in the next stage if Team The Ren win their next match against Team Myoo from the Gandhara faction. During the fight, Ren attacks the member he assumes to be the weakest and is surprised to find out his Over Soul is able to simply neutralize his furyoku.
40	"Humility"; Transliteration: "Jifurazu" (Japanese: 不自負)	Fumio Maezono	Joji Furuta	Takeshi Mori	January 20, 2022
Ren reveals a new Over Soul that manages to land a hit on Yainage, who loses his focus and is removed from the fight by his own team mates. Having exhausted most of his Furyoku, Ren stops fighting to let Horohoro and Joco take over, but he is attacked from behind and passes out. Joco is infuriated by this, but Pascual explains Ren was hit by a purely mental attack that caused nothing to his body. In flashbacks, it is revealed that Pascual participated in a previous Shaman Fight. With the help of Orona, he trains Ren and Horohoro to catch up with Joco's current power level. Back to the present, Joco is mortally wounded and Horohoro has to face the remaining enemies alone. He successfully blocks attacks with ice shields and then unleashes his new Over Soul to easily defeat the remaining opponents. Pascual explains that neutralizing furyoku is the only strategy Team Myoon knows and that their neutrality has no effect against their opponents' resolve. Sati, the leader of the Gandhara faction, despite her team's loss, is happy with Horohoro's performance and says she has found her "fifth warrior". Jun and Bo'z are revealed to be working for her. Meanwhile, Hao comments on how Horohoro's birth name plays with combinations of Japanese words that refer to ice and fire, which relates to the Frostbites caused by his attack. Hao is also unhappy with Gandhara's plans and tells Team Moon they "know what to do" before declaring the "star festival" officially started. Impressed with Ren's group power increase, Yoh leaves the stadium before the end of the match to train and takes Ryu and Faust with him. Team X-Laws II are seen devising an unrevealed plan.
41	"Encounters in Hell"; Transliteration: "Jigoku Meguriai" (Japanese: 地獄めぐりあい)	Satoshi Saga	Shōji Yonemura	Masaki Ōzora	January 27, 2022
Team X-Laws II attempt to assassinate Hao by sniping him, but Porf hesitates when he sees Hao crying through the scope. Their plan fails and Hao kills both him and Larch. As Denbat is cornered, he reveals his angel Raphael is ready to shoot Hao with a secret X-Laws weapon that fires a high energy beam from space. Hao survives the shot and burns Denbat's body and soul, infuriated that his team mate witnessed "something he shouldn't have seen". Meanwhile, Marco, who is driving Jeanne, Tamao, Manta and Lyserg, is blinded by the light and is mortally wounded by Anatel's brother, Anahol, in a surprise attack. Lyserg begs Jeanne to fight while he takes control of the car, but she hesitates and the vehicle is destroyed. Sati approaches Yoh and says she wants to send him to hell so he can become stronger. Yoh prepares to fight her, but after she sees the beam, she executes him in tears, claiming they're "running out of time". In hell, Yoh and Amidamaru are greeted by the giant demon whom Yoh defeated in Osore, who is now working for Sati as a guide for her selected warriors. In the next stage, he meets his predecessor Yohken, who partially destroys his arms. Yoh then notices Yohken is able to recreate his Over Soul even without Matamune and realizes he can create things out of sheer will. He then restores his arms and reveals his new Oversoul Spirit of the Sword: White Swan. Matamune watches the fight from a distance and comments that Yoh reached Hao's level of 1,000 years before and now it's time to reach his power of 500 years before.
42	"A Great Trial"; Transliteration: "Dai Shiren" (Japanese: 大試練)	Cao Yi	Jin Tanaka	Shōtarō Kitamura	February 3, 2022
Matamune observes the fight from afar, expresses hope that Yohken will be "saved" by Yoh and praises the latter for becoming stronger. He then boards a train. After the fight, the two Asakuras make peace, but Yohken's soul is crushed by a monster self-identified as an "ultra demon". After confirming with him that Yohken has been lost forever, Yoh defeats the monster, but a horde of other ultra demons appear and he prepares to fight them, counting on the force of his own soul. Meanwhile, Sati explains to Ryu that once Hao enters the state of deep sleep before becoming Shaman King, all five elemental spirits, including the Spirit of Fire, will be deprived of a master, and shall then be "taken" as part of "Gandhara's true mission". Namari, the Patch official responsible for her faction, overhears their conversation and warns her against proceeding with the plan, saying she knows very well what the officials are "truly capable of". Team Moon then appears and Hang reveals Yoh, Ren, Joco, Horohoro and Lyserg are the five warriors and that all X-Laws have been killed, including Lyserg, whose body should have been lost in the car's explosion, rendering him beyond resurrection. An infuriated Ryu tries to attack Hang, but is stopped by Sati, who claims her faction "does not threaten lives". Hang then mortally wounds her. In hell, Lyserg is brutally attacked by a demon whilst finding himself deprived of both Morphine and Zelel. Meanwhile, Myoo visit and kill Ren, Horohoro and Joco so they can all go to hell, too. Pascual explains to Joco that he met Gandhara in the Shaman Fight of 1,000 years before, when he was killed by Hao, and the memories cause him to manifest his original human form. He then pushes Joco down to the depths of hell, says he will now help "the last of the five warriors", while expressing hopes that Matamune will help "the other two" before boarding a train similar to the one Matamune boarded earlier. Meanwhile, Ponchi and Conchi manage to save Manta and Tamao and preserve Marco, Lyserg and Jeanne's bodies. Tamao and Manta attempt to fight Anahol, who effortlessly defends himself and reveals to be working for Hao. Marco, who was saved by Shamash under Jeanne's command just before the car was destroyed, reawakens and stops Anahol. However, Hao comes and says Sati and Faust have just been killed, just like the five warriors, and now there's no one to resurrect them. Marco has Michael transform into his super car form and take the others away from there.
43	"The End of a Dream"; Transliteration: "Yume no Owari" (Japanese: 夢の終わり)	Aya Kobayashi	Fumihiko Shimo	Takeshi Mori	February 10, 2022
Anna appears and confronts Hao, allowing the others to escape with the help of the Golem, but not before Hao reveals that the beam made the island's location known to the whole world, and that he plans to kill anyone who interferes with the Shaman Fight. Now alone with Anna, he wonders why she wanted to be left behind and hypothesises that it is so she can reveal her "true power" away from the others. Meanwhile, Goldva comments on these developments with the other officials and Magna says no one shall interfere with the "second stage" of the tournament, claiming most of the qualified teams have already been determined, while images of underwater ruins are shown. Goldva then says they shall consult the Great Spirit's will and fulfill their life duties, which Silva, walking alongside them, confirms. Ren and Horohoro face their hells while Pascual watches Lyserg from afar and says he must have a lot of darkness in his heart to have been brought to that kind of hell and says even he can't help him now. Yoh defeats the last demon and asks him to take him further to meet a more powerful adversary as Yohken emerges alongside Amidamaru. In the living world, Ryu is even more infuriated that Sati is killed, but Yoh is revived by Faust and prevents Ryu from losing his mind. Yoh confronts Namari, who says his mission is to protect the Shaman King and that shall be Hao, but Yoh denies it and says he will be it. Faust says reviving people consumes too much furyoku and that he may only be able to do it one more time. Yoh wants him to revive Sati and easily dispatches Team Moon once they try to stop it. Team Flower are tasked with destroying Team The Ren's bodies, but they are revived before that with the help of Jun. Brocken appears and assigns the three girls to a new mission before the trios can fight each other. Hao's followers meet on a beach to stop the military from interfering, but are all massacred by Peyote and Manta's bodyguard Midori Tamurazaki, who are revealed to be working together. Peyote reveals Hao's mind-reading power and says their group is nothing but a group of "pawns for him to sacrifice". He also says he is the one who loved Hao the most and now hates him before killing himself with his own Over Soul. Midori then makes a call and reveals Manta's father Mansumi, who was seen earlier in the episode approaching the island with some military, is after the Great Spirit. Team Flower's souls run after Hao to question him and reach him just as Anna manages to wound him. He then says he needs to restore his spiritual power and announces his intention to eat their souls. In hell, Lyserg struggles to stand his grown and start realizing the environment around him was created by his own mind and therefore he can shape his own power body and power. Pascual intervenes and gives him Morphine and Michael to help him even the odds.
44	"Speak Slowly"; Transliteration: "Yukkuri Hanasu" (Japanese: ゆっくり話す)	Shigeki Awai	Joji Furuta	Takeshi Mori	February 24, 2022
Anna knocks out Hao and instructs the Team Flower's souls to leave before they are consumed. She uses one of her shikigami to protect them after he gets back up, and it ends up consumed. Hao then insists that Anna show him "her true self", but Yoh emerges and says that's exactly who she is. Instead of fighting, both siblings drink coffee together. Yoh believes Hao has no empathy and Hao explains he knew from the beginning that Peyote was a traitor, but never thought he would actually do something, and that he knows everyone is afraid of him. Yoh suggests this is because he uses his power to control others. Hao admits he does like Opacho and Luchist, due to the former's heart and the latter's strength. Later, Yoh and Ren discuss Hao and Yoh decides that he wishes to save Hao from his loneliness and become his friend. Anna plans to interrogate Team Flower in exchange for allowing their souls to "rest in peace". Mikihisa finds the corpses of Hao's followers and sounds a horn. The Taos and the Asakuras meet and he brings Brocken, who survived the attack, in order to get him to cooperate with them. Jeanne is revived and partners with Sati to prepare the five warriors, who are all already back except for Lyserg. The next day, Team Funbari and Team the Ren face each other, with both going for the jugular and Ren applying lethal force on Yoh.
45	"The First and the Last"; Transliteration: "Saisho de Saigo no" (Japanese: 最初で最期の)	Yoshitsugu Kimura	Shōji Yonemura	Masaki Ōzora	March 3, 2022
Yoh survives the attack and as he, Ren and Horohoro head for a final attack, the revived Lyserg interrupts the fight and says it no longer makes sense. Sati and Jeanne emerge and explain that both of the remaining Gandhara teams, as well as Mikihisa's team, are stepping out of the tournament so that Team The Ren, Team Funbari, Team Star and Team X-Laws I can qualify for the finals, with Goldva's approval. That night, Hao joins Yoh's group in a bath and Pascual confirms that they plan to take the five elemental spirits: the Spirit of Earth (for Yoh), the Spirit of Thunder (for Ren), the Spirit of Rain (for Horohoro), Hao's own Spirit of Fire (for Lyserg) and the Spirit of Wind (for Joco). Lyserg, whose new Over Soul uses fire, explains that the element is unconnected to Hao, but rather a reference to the fire of hate that scorches his soul. Hao reveals that the next stage of the Shaman Fight will take place in the lost continent of Mu and that Manta's father is leading the military operation approaching the island. He leaves, blaming Yoh for bringing "strangers" into the Shaman Fight and telling him it's time to take responsibility. Manta thinks he can talk some sense into his father, but Anna denies it and reveals his cellphone has been wiretapped by his own father. She also tells Yoh the fight will serve as training, since Yoh will face non-shamanic forces and "soulless weapons". Luchist, Marco, the Asakuras, the Taos, Hao and Yoh's group all agree to join forces and stop the incoming attack. Luchist also tells Marco that Hans Reiheit, a former member of the X-Laws, is working with Tamurazaki. Redseb questions Mikihisa over removing their team from the tournament and he explains that the fights will get more serious now and he promised their father that he would take care of them. In his thoughts, Redseb still feels like joining the fight against Hao. On the next day, the fighters wait on the beach while Faust, Jun and Jeanne stand by in case there are any casualties in either side. Luchist informs them they have two hours to board the Patches' submarine Over Soul that will take them to Mu. Hao assures Yoh he will kill "only a few" of the military and that he can also use healing powers since he has a lot of spare furyoku. He then heads for the assault and destroys a ship.
46	"True Justice"; Transliteration: "Shinjitsu no Seigi" (Japanese: 真実の正義)	Keisuke Nishijima	Jin Tanaka	Takeshi Mori	March 10, 2022
Hao easily kills the enemy forces, and everyone is struck with awe by his power, besides wondering why did he even request help in the first place. When he approaches Mansumi's ship, Hans fires his angel, which has a power level of 470,000 (higher than the Spirit of Fire). Hao survives the attack with a concentrated fireball and Hans dies from the shock of having such a strong Over Soul dismantled. Earlier, he explained that his angel is so powerful that he is only able to control it for 3 seconds. Hao also kills an unknown woman who was accompanying Hans and intended to wound him with a Voodoo doll. Hao returns to the beach without destroying Mansumi's ship and comments that he intends to use his remaining furyoku to resurrect the fallen soldiers. Anna and Anahol discuss Hao. Anna says he is stronger than Yoh only as a shaman. Hao emerges and Anna wonders why didn't he kill Manta's father. Hao then explains that despite what he did to Lyserg's parents, the idea of killing a parent does "cause some degree of perplexity" on him. Anna asks if that is his weakness, he replies "who knows" and they laugh. As soon as they arrive in Mu, Goldva prepares to explain the rules, but Yoh announces Team Funbari, Team the Ren and Team X-I are giving up to let Hao become the Shaman King and kill him in his sleep. Goldva suggests facing the entire team of Patch officials may not be so much easier than just facing Hao. Two Patch girls appear and take Hao to the coronation ceremonies. Before Yoh's group can proceed, Luchist stops them and says no one shall step into the sacred shaman king space. Marco challenges him, and both fight until death after sharing memories of how Luchist met Hao and, even after trying to kill him, was allowed a chance to join his group, where he met other "outcasts" who were "seeking their own justices"; and how Marco was cared by Luchist as a child after his mother died. The group advances and allows Opacho to join them on her request. Shortly afterwards, Silva steps in as the first defiant and easily defends himself from everyone's attacks. Yoh forms his new Over Soul and says he's been waiting for a chance to defeat him since their first encounter in the Shaman Fight test match (see episode 5).
47	"Plants"; Transliteration: "Puranto" (Japanese: プラント)	Fumio Maezono	Fumihiko Shimo	Takeshi Mori	March 17, 2022
Yoh and Silva have a brief fight, but Namari and Blon interrupt it and instruct Silva to go back to his post. Then, they explain that the way to the king's sanctuary is divided in 10 "plants", each guarded by one Patch official: Desert, Valley, Volcano, Lake, Plateau, Forest, Cave, Ocean, Glacier, and Space. Pascual, who's been to Mu before, explains they have around 15 hours to reach Hao before he is fully integrated with the Great Spirit. In the first plant, Desert, Ren and Horohoro prove unable to attack because there is no humidity for lightning or ice to form. Ryu steps in and sacrifices himself to reveal the secret behind Namari's snake Over Soul. Horohoro and Ren then harness enough of the local oasis's water to generate a small ice cube and convert it into particles for Ren to generate some lightning that fry Namari alive. Recognizing Ryu's value, the group agrees to revive him. In the next plant, the Valley, they face Blom, who uses a spider Over Soul to seemingly float around the plant, trap Yoh's group in an indestructible web and kill Ren and Horohoro. He reveals that the Patches are able to sing songs mid-battle to increase their strength. Lyserg, who escaped the web and is revealed to be one of Blom's Shaman Fight contestants, uses his fire to burn Blom alive. In the island, Hans proposes to Teruko, the woman who was accompanying him in the fight, after she comments that she intended to use the financial reward from the job, had it been successfully completed, to look for a husband. Mansumi is captured by Anna and asks to be left alone with Manta to have a word with his son. The Taos, the Asakuras and Brocken share a meal and Yohmei asks Anna to calculate how much furyoku is left in Yoh's group. Team Moon and Team Flower are resurrected, except for Peyote and Turbine, whose bodies were damaged beyond recovery.
48	"Ever Since"; Transliteration: "Kore made Zutto" (Japanese: これまでずっと)	Moe Sasaki	Joji Furuta	Takeshi Mori	March 24, 2022
Blum survives the fire and mortally wounds Lyserg. Jeanne steps in and locks him in a torture device, but he converts his own body into the Over Soul and attacks. Lyserg, who survived the attack with Marco's bulletproof glasses, returns to the fight and burns him for good. In the next plant, the Volcano, Magna uses his owl Over Soul to crush Jeanne's iron maiden, but it is empty because she was left in the previous plant after exhausting her furyoku to resurrect Ren and Horohoro. Feeling guilty, the duo step in for the fight and Ren manages to fry Magna alive with his evolved, post-death power. Jeanne is seen praying for the group's success in the bottom of the Valley. During the fight, Opacho comments on Ren's behavior and Yoh deduces she is able to read minds. He then has a brief vision of a demon and the letter "z". As they leave the Volcano, Yoh comments on Opacho's ability and wonders why Hao left someone with such skill with them, hypothesizing that he wants them to go after him. In the next plant, the Lake, Radim easily defends himself with a sword Over Soul generated with furyoku concentrated on his microphone. Suddenly, he attacks the otherwise passive Faust. Meanwhile, Hao reaches the last plant, Space, in which an alien-like Patch called Rutherford welcomes him and explains that the Mu people were technologically advanced and created the plants to reproduce Earth's main environments in hopes of migrating to space one day. However, they couldn't survive a natural disaster, since they were "only human". Hao then reaches the sanctuary. In the island, Anna reveals that Yoh's group has a combined furyoku of just under 800,000, with only roughly half of it remaining. Hao's resurrected followers feel isolated because they have no place in the world anymore and Brocken, who was revealed to be Hao's adoptive father, comments with Mikihisa that they are both fathers to Hao, they both wear masks, they are enemies but still are sharing a meal together, causing both to laugh. Mikihisa then receives news from Jun that Redseb and Seyrarm are missing. The siblings are seen heading to Mu with the Golem in underwater mode just as its radar pinpoints Hao.
49	"Good Night"; Transliteration: "Oyasumi" (Japanese: おやすみ)	Yūto Nakamura	Jin Tanaka	Takeshi Mori	March 31, 2022
Faust survives the attack and manages to imitate the Patches' singing technique to increase his power. Nevertheless, he ends up killed. Yoh steps in and kills Radim. Faust's soul reunites with Eliza's and the couple join the group in advancing to the next plant, the Plateau, where they face Kalim. Horohoro attacks him, but is easily knocked out. Before the fight continues, a friendly Kalim offers to host them for the night so they can get some rest and Horohoro is treated by a Faust-incorporated Yoh. As the day dawns, Yoh goes for a walk with Amidamaru and explains tht he knows he will probably die when facing Hao, but he accepts his fate. As everyone else wakes up and join him, Kalim attacks Horohoro and invites him to unleash his "true self" by provoking him with his birth name, Usui Horokeu, which infuriates him. Meanwhile, Redseb and Seyrarm attempt to attack Hao, but the Spirit of Fire kills them first. The Golem remains active and Hao reveals that Seyrarm's soul is commanding it, so he orders Goldva to deal with it. After the Patch leader smashes it with her Big Chief Over Soul, Hao has the Spirit of Fire eat Seyrarm's soul before sending it with Redseb to Yoh. Once the child reaches Yoh, the group comforts him, claiming the Great Spirit may resurrect him and even recover his sister. They also discuss how to use the Spirit of Fire in combat. In hell, Gandhara succeeds in retrieving three additional elemental spirits: the Spirits of Thunder, Rain and Wind, with only the Spirit of Earth remaining. In the island, Mikihisa is upset with the siblings while Anna compares the battle against Hao with a fairytale and hypothesises that Yoh is trying to save "the demon" as if it were "the princess".
50	"Falling Damuko"; Transliteration: "Fōrin Damuko" (Japanese: フォーリンダム子)	Masakazu Yoshimoto	Fumihiko Shimo	Akira Tsuchiya	April 7, 2022
In flashbacks, Horohoro remembers when a new girl joined his class in school five years before and was nicknamed "Damuko" because her father was a businessman seeking to build a dam and flood their territories. The girl was ostracized, but Horohoro befriended her, until his tribe's elderly ordered him to cut contact with her due to her father's plan. On the following day, Horohoro ignored Damuko, who followed him into the mountains, got lost and froze to death. Consumed by guilt, Horohoro intensified his trainings in hopes of becoming the Shaman King, apologizing to her and creating a large field of fuki, a plant she liked. Kororo then reveals to be actually the soul of Damuko, who refused to leave the Ainu territory after death and was offered the option of becoming a koro-pok-guru by Gororo in order to stay. Horohoro defeats Kalim, grateful for what he did for him in life, and the group advances to the next plant, the Forest, where Opacho makes short work of Renim, who used his chameleon Over Soul to hide from the warriors, but was still spotted by her due to her mind-reading abilities. Yoh remembers the night Hao slept with them and told him that the mind-reading power is a consequence of loneliness and the eager to know how other people see one. He then talks of a demon friend he had in his first life called Ohachiyo, after which Opacho was named when she was adopted by Hao. In the next plant, the Cave, Ren dominates a neutral Nichrom and invites him to fight with his heart, fueled by his brother's murder by Ren. Nichrom finally lets his emotions out and initiates a more balanced fight, but Ren still wins. In the next plant, the Ocean, Thallim uses several different plant spirits to deflect each attack until Joco uses the power of the wind to erode and dry out all the plants so he becomes vulnerable. In the next plant, the Glacier, Yoh finds Silva waiting for him.
51	"Last Test: Shaman Fight" (Japanese: LAST TEST SHAMAN FIGHT)	Satohiko Sano	Joji Furuta	Satohiko Sano	April 14, 2022
Manta has a dream of "princess Hao", in a plot where she is trapped by a villain called "hate" and must be saved by the "heart". He then boards a sphinx-shaped submarine generated by Anahol's Over Soul and joins Anna and the remaining allies on the island on a journey to Mu. Yoh defeats Silva after a fight in which both manifest respect and admiration for each other. Before entering the final plant, Space, they discuss how to survive in the probable vacuum environment and Ryu offers to use the heads of his Yamata no Orochi to protect each shaman. They then face Rutherfor, an alien-like Patch that manipulates gravity to easily dominate the warriors. While her alien appearance is just an Over Soul, her guardian spirit is an actual extraterrestrial being who fell on Earth and taught some technology to the Patch tribe, including the oracle bells, before dying of natural causes. Aware that her powers are just consequences of her Over Soul, Yoh uses furyoku nullification to cancel her power and navigate freely around the plant. Before the fight continues, however, their oracle bells ring and the message "how small" appears on screen, signalizing that Hao has just awakened. The new shaman king easily decimates Yoh's group, Opacho, Anahol's sphinx, Goldva, Rutherfor and the two Patch ceremonialists. Inside the Great Spirit, Hao and Yoh have a conversation and, once annoyed, Hao tries to get rid of Yoh, but he stays against Hao's will. Ren, Horohoro, Joco and Lyserg then join them and Hao deduces that because they had the powers of the five elemental spirits, which were created from the Great Spirit itself, they can navigate freely around the place. He then reveals his new Over Soul Great Spirit and reminds them that if they die there, their existence will end forever.
52	"Shaman King: God End" (Japanese: SHAMAN KING GOD END)	Haru Shinomiya	Shōji Yonemura	Joji Furuta	April 21, 2022
Hao emulates space and uses his Over Soul to attack the group with space phenomena such as meteors and black holes, but the warriors stand their ground with the power of the elemental spirits. A train suddenly arrives, bringing every character from the series, including Hao's first mother, who reprehends Hao for his behavior. He then agrees to keep humans alive if Yoh's group is able to make the Earth a better place without getting rid of non-shamans. In flash-forwards, Yoh's son Hana is excited for the first reunion of the five warriors. Future Ren has a child with Jeanne; Joco was let out of prison earlier with the help of Lyserg; Ryu and Faust work for Yoh and Anna and Hao is seen befriending a Matamune-like cat.

== Home media release ==
The series consists of 52 episodes released on four Blu-ray Disc boxes, each with 13 episodes: released on August 25, 2021, November 24, 2021, February 23, 2022, and May 25, 2022, respectively.

King Records (Japan, Region 2/A)
Chapter	Episodes	Release date	Ref.
Boxset 1	1–13	August 25, 2021	
Boxset 2	14–26	November 24, 2021	
Boxset 3	27–39	February 23, 2022	
Boxset 4	40–52	May 25, 2022	
