= Xingtian =

Chinese deity

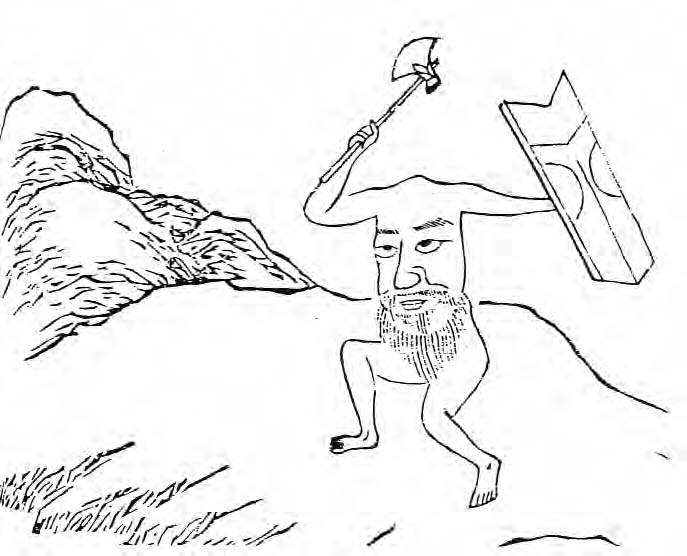
Xingtian as drawn by Jiang Yinghao, 17th century

Xingtian (Chinese: 刑天; pinyin: Xíngtiān; lit. 'Punishing Heaven', also Hsing T'ien) is a Chinese deity who fights against the Supreme Divinity, not giving up even after he was decapitated. Losing the fight for supremacy, he was beheaded and his head buried in Changyang Mountain. Nevertheless, headless, with a shield in one hand and a battle axe in the other, he continues the fight, using his nipples as eyes and his belly button as a mouth.

== Description ==
Xingtian was an official under Yandi. Yandi fought against Huangdi for the position of supreme god, but he lost the conflict. Xingtian still continued the fight after Yandi's defeat, but was defeated and decapitated by Huangdi. Eventually, he regenerated himself and continued his defiance, which was expressed by a martial dance.

== Literature ==
Xingtian appears in chapter 7 of the Classic of Mountains and Seas, which states that he fought and lost against the supreme god to become the supreme divinity. The god decapitated Xingtian and buried his head on Changyang Mountain. However, Xingtian persevered, using his nipples as his eyes, using his navel as his mouth, and brandishing his shield and axe. The Shanhaijing states the following:

Xingtian and the Supreme God Di came to this place and struggled against each other for ultimate power. The Supreme God cut off Xingtian's head and buried him at Eternally Auspicious Mountain. Xiangtian's nipples then transformed into eyes, and his navel became a mouth. He performs a dance with an axe and shield."

In Luo Mi's Lushi from the Southern Song period, Xingtian (Note: This Xingtian is written with a different character for Xing, but many scholars argue that it represent the same figure.) is described as a minister of the Yan Emperor, who composed music for farmers for plowing and harvesting.

In the Huainanzi, Xingtian is called the corpse of Xingcan (形殘之尸).

The scholar Guo Pu celebrated Xingtian's defiant spirit in an encomium. He mentions the similarity between Xingtian and the corpse of Geng of the Xia, since they were both characters who regenerated and continued their resistance.

The poet Tao Qian also celebrated Xingtian's spirit in his Thirteen Poems upon Reading the Guideways through Mountains and Seas, where he made an association between Jingwei and Xingtian in their persistence to overcome tragedies but also mentions their inability to be free from it:

[Jingwei] bites hold of twigs, determined to fill up the deep-blue sea. Xingtian dances wildly with spear and shield, his old ambitions still burn fiercely. (Note: Also translated as: "Xingtian brandished his shield and battle-ax, his fierce spirit will live forever.") After blending with things, no anxieties should remain. After metamorphosing, all one's regrets should flee. In vain do they cling to their hearts from the past. How can they, a better day, foresee?

== Symbolism ==
Xingtian symbolizes the indomitable spirit which maintains the will to resist no matter what tribulations one may undergo or what troubles one may encounter. As such, Xingtian has been lauded in poetry and prose.

== In popular culture ==
- In Smite, Xing Tian is a playable character.
- In Shaman King: Red Crimson, Xing Tian (Keiten) is the spirit ally of Dong Honhon.
- In Age of Mythology: Retold, the Chinese titan is based on Xingtian.

== See also ==
- Headless men
- Kabandha
- Weapons and armor in Chinese mythology, legend, cultural symbology, and fiction

== Bibliography ==
- Yang, Lihui, et al. (2005). Handbook of Chinese Mythology. New York: Oxford University Press. ISBN 978-0-19-533263-6
- Strassberg, Richard (2002). A Chinese Bestiary: Strange Creatures from the Guideways Through Mountains and Seas. University of California Press.
