= Shaman King: The Super Star =

Japanese manga series

- Cover of the first volume
- Genre: Adventure; Supernatural
- Manga
- Written by: Hiroyuki Takei
- Published by: Kodansha
- English publisher: NA: Kodansha USA (digital)
- Imprint: Magazine Edge KC
- Magazine: Shōnen Magazine Edge (2018–2023); Magazine Pocket (2024)
- Original run: May 17, 2018 – November 23, 2024
- Volumes: 10
- icon

Shaman King: The Super Star is a Japanese manga series written and illustrated by Hiroyuki Takei. It is a sequel to Takei's Shaman King: Flowers, which is itself a sequel to his original series, Shaman King. It was serialized in Kodansha's shōnen manga magazine Shōnen Magazine Edge from May 2018 until October 2023, when the magazine ceased publication. It later continued on the Magazine Pocket online platform from August to November 2024.

== Publication ==
Written and illustrated by Hiroyuki Takei, Shaman King: The Super Star was announced in December 2017. Three prologue chapters were published in Kodansha's shōnen manga magazine Shōnen Magazine Edge on April 17, 2018. The series officially began serialization in the magazine on May 17, 2018. On October 18, 2023, Shōnen Magazine Edge ceased publication. The series resumed on Kodansha's online platform Magazine Pocket on August 24, 2024, and concluded on November 23 of that same year. Kodansha compiled the series into ten tankōbon volumes, published from November 15, 2018, to January 8, 2025.

In July 2020, Kodansha USA announced the digital English-language release of the Shaman King spin-offs, including Shaman King: The Super Star, which was originally scheduled for August 2020; however, the release was delayed to December 1 of that same year, and the last volume was released on December 2, 2025.

=== Volumes ===
No.	Original release date	Original ISBN	English release date	English ISBN
1	November 15, 2018	978-4-06-513666-9; 978-4-06-514052-9 (SE)	December 1, 2020	978-1-64659-376-7
2	August 16, 2019	978-4-06-516899-8	December 15, 2020	978-1-64659-645-4
3	December 17, 2019	978-4-06-517995-6	December 22, 2020	978-1-64659-695-9
4	June 17, 2020	978-4-06-519788-2	December 29, 2020	978-1-64659-812-0
5	February 17, 2021	978-4-06-521391-9	July 6, 2021	978-1-63699-216-7
6	August 17, 2022	978-4-06-528879-5	May 14, 2023	978-1-68491-982-6
7	July 14, 2023	978-4-06-532407-3	October 31, 2023	979-8-88933-200-8
8	December 15, 2023	978-4-06-534188-9	June 4, 2024	979-8-88933-562-7
9	November 8, 2024	978-4-06-537397-2	March 11, 2025	979-8-89478-431-1
10	January 8, 2025	978-4-06-538076-5	December 2, 2025	979-8-89478-802-9
