= Shaman King & a Garden =

Japanese manga series

- First tankōbon volume cover
- Genre: Adventure; Supernatural
- Created by: Hiroyuki Takei
- Manga
- Written by: Jet Kusamura
- Illustrated by: Kyo Nuesawa
- Published by: Kodansha
- English publisher: NA: Kodansha USA (digital)
- Imprint: KC Deluxe
- Magazine: Nakayoshi
- Original run: December 1, 2020 – May 2, 2022
- Volumes: 4
- icon

Shaman King & a Garden is a Japanese manga series by Jet Kusamura and Kyo Nuesawa. It is a spin-off to the original Shaman King manga series by Hiroyuki Takei. It was serialized in Kodansha's shōjo manga magazine Nakayoshi from December 2020 to May 2022, with its chapters collected in four tankōbon volumes.

== Publication ==
Conceptualized by Jet Kusamura and illustrated by Kyo Nuesawa, Shaman King & a Garden was serialized in Kodansha's shōjo manga magazine Nakayoshi from December 1, 2020, to May 2, 2022. Kodansha collected its chapters in four tankōbon volumes, released from April 15, 2021, to August 17, 2022.

In North America, the manga was licensed for English digital release by Kodansha USA. The four volumes were released from December 14, 2021, to January 31, 2023.

=== Volumes ===
No.	Original release date	Original ISBN	English release date	English ISBN
1	April 15, 2021	978-4-06-523040-4	December 14, 2021	978-1-63699-512-0
2	August 17, 2021	978-4-06-524527-9	January 11, 2022	978-1-63699-555-7
3	March 17, 2022	978-4-06-526624-3	September 27, 2022	978-1-68491-461-6
4	August 17, 2022	978-4-06-528929-7	January 31, 2023	978-1-68491-667-2
