= Shaman King: Marcos =

Japanese manga series

- First tankōbon volume cover

SHAMAN KING マルコス (Shāman Kingu Marukosu)
- Genre: Adventure; Supernatural
- Created by: Hiroyuki Takei
- Manga
- Written by: Jet Kusamura
- Published by: Kodansha
- English publisher: NA: Kodansha USA (digital)
- Imprint: Magazine Edge KC
- Magazine: Shōnen Magazine Edge
- Original run: April 17, 2020 – June 17, 2022
- Volumes: 5
- icon

Shaman King: Marcos (Japanese: SHAMAN KING マルコス, Hepburn: Shāman Kingu Marukosu) is a Japanese manga series by Jet Kusamura. It is a spin-off to the original Shaman King manga series by Hiroyuki Takei. It was serialized in Kodansha's Shōnen Magazine Edge from April 2020 to June 2022, with its chapters collected in five tankōbon volumes.

== Publication ==
Written by Hiroyuki Takei and illustrated by Jet Kusamura, Shaman King: Marcos was serialized in Kodansha's Shōnen Magazine Edge from April 17, 2020, to June 17, 2022. Kodansha has collected its chapters into five tankōbon volumes, released from August 17, 2020, and the last on August 17, 2022.

In January 2021, Kodansha USA announced that they have licensed the series for English digital release, with the first volume made available on March 9, 2021, and the last on April 18, 2023.

=== Volumes ===
No.	Original release date	Original ISBN	English release date	English ISBN
1	August 17, 2020	978-4-06-520630-0	March 9, 2021	978-1-64659-996-7
2	March 17, 2021	978-4-06-522326-0	July 13, 2021	978-1-63699-224-2
3	October 15, 2021	978-4-06-525390-8	February 15, 2022	978-1-63699-616-5
4	March 17, 2022	978-4-06-527244-2	September 20, 2022	978-1-68491-450-0
5	August 17, 2022	978-4-06-528880-1	April 18, 2023	978-1-68491-892-8
