= Shaman King: Flowers =

Japanese manga series

- First tankōbon volume cover, featuring Hana Asakura (back) and Amidamaru (front)

シャーマンキングFLOWERS (Shāman Kingu Furawāzu)
- Genre: Adventure; Supernatural
- Manga
- Written by: Hiroyuki Takei
- Published by: Shueisha (former); Kodansha (current)
- English publisher: NA: Kodansha USA
- Imprint: Young Jump Comics (Shueisha); Magazine Edge KC (Kodansha)
- Magazine: Jump X
- Original run: April 10, 2012 – October 10, 2014
- Volumes: 6
- Anime television series
- Directed by: Takeshi Furuta
- Written by: Shoji Yonemura
- Music by: Yuki Hayashi
- Studio: Bridge
- Licensed by: Netflix (streaming rights)
- Original network: TXN (TV Tokyo), AT-X
- Original run: January 10, 2024 – April 3, 2024
- Episodes: 13
- icon

Shaman King: Flowers (Japanese: シャーマンキングFLOWERS, Hepburn: Shāman Kingu Furawāzu) is a Japanese manga series written and illustrated by Hiroyuki Takei. It is a sequel to Takei's original manga series Shaman King. It was serialized in Shueisha's Jump X manga magazine from April 2012 to October 2014, with its chapters collected in six tankōbon volumes. An anime television series by Bridge aired from January to April 2024.

The manga series was followed by Shaman King: The Super Star, which was published from 2018 to 2024.

== Plot ==
Shaman King: Flowers follows the adventures of Hana Asakura (Anna and Yoh's son) and his adventures in the Shaman world, as well as with the Asakura clan. It also follows the lives of the next generation of the original cast of Shaman King.

== Media ==
=== Manga ===
Written and illustrated by Hiroyuki Takei, Shaman King: Flowers was serialized in Shueisha's Jump X manga magazine from April 10, 2012, to October 10, 2014. Shueisha collected its chapters in six tankōbon volumes, released from August 10, 2012, to December 19, 2014. Kodansha republished the volumes digitally in 2019.

In July 2020, Kodansha USA announced the digital English language release of the Shaman King's spin-offs, and Shaman King: Flowers was originally scheduled to start its release on August 11 of that same year; however, it was delayed, and the six volumes were released from October 20 to December 22 of that same year. They were released in print from May 2, 2023, to January 16, 2024.

==== Volumes ====
| No. | Original release date | Original ISBN | English release date | English ISBN |
|---|---|---|---|---|
| 1 | August 10, 2012 | 978-4-08-879414-3 | October 20, 2020 (digital); May 2, 2023 (print) | 978-1-64659-375-0 (digital); 978-1-64651-816-6 (print) |
01. "Flower Bud" (つぼみ, "Tsubomi"); 02. "My Relatives Came to Kill Me" (親戚が殺しに来た, "Shinseki ga Koroshi ni Kita"); 03. "Is It Wilting?" (枯れてる?, "Kareteru?"); 04. "West Tokyo Sound Effect Festival" (西東京擬音祭り, "Nishi-Tokyo Gion Matsuri")
Young shaman Hana Asakura lives in Tokyo under the protection of Tamao Tamamura and Ryu Umemiya while his parents are away. Frustrated and bored that he is unable to use his shaman powers, he is one day challenged by Yohane Asakura, a member of the Asakura's branch family who seek to displace the main family. After Hana beats Yohane, Yohane's sister Luca attempts to avenge her brother's loss and finish Hana off. Though Yohane and Luca nearly succeed, Hana is saved by Alumi Niumbirch, a disciple of Hana's mother who introduces herself as Hana's fiancé.
| 2 | December 10, 2012 | 978-4-08-879493-8 | October 27, 2020 (digital); May 16, 2023 (print) | 978-1-64659-629-4 (digital); 978-1-64651-817-3 (print) |
05. "The Return of the Precocious Shaman" (帰ってきたおシャマなシャーマン, "Kaettekita Oshama na Shāman"); 06. "Home Raid" (カチコミ自宅, "Kachikomi Jitaku"); 07. "Sense of Loss" (喪失感, "Sōshitsukan"); 08. "No Eloping!" (逃避行それは非行, "Tōhikō sore wa Hikō")
Following Luka and Yohane's escape, Hana recovers at the hospital where Alumi reveals she has been sent to Tokyo to protect Hana during the "Flowers of Maize", a battle that will affect the world in an unknown way. After Tamao confronts and defeats Yohane and Luca's father, the siblings are forced to enroll in Hana's school after a truce is called between the main and branch families. Hana and Yohane develop an unexpected friendship, as do their guardian spirits, Amidamaru and Oboro Daikyoh. Despite the truce, Luka plots against Hana by having the school's delinquents attack him while Amidamaru is unable to assist him.
| 3 | May 10, 2013 | 978-4-08-879556-0 | November 3, 2020 (digital); July 11, 2023 (print) | 978-1-64659-689-8 (digital); 978-1-64651-818-0 (print) |
09. "Shocking Mall 2014" (ショッキングモール2014, Shokkingu Mōru 2014); 10. "Setsubun" (節分, Setsubun); 11. "A Demon Lies Down by the River" (鬼、河原に寝込む, Oni, Kawara ni Nekomu); 12. "Babylon Boy" (バビロンボーイ, Babiron Bōi)
| 4 | October 10, 2013 | 978-4-08-879660-4 | November 10, 2020 (digital); September 19, 2023 (print) | 978-1-64659-803-8 (digital); 978-1-64651-878-4 (print) |
13. "Partial Bloom" (一分咲き, Ichibu Saki); 14. "The Flower We Saw That Day Tried to Kill You, But You Wouldn't Die" (あの日見た花がお前を撲殺も だが死なない。, Ano hi Mita Hana ga Omae o Bokusatsu Modaga Shinanai.); 15. "Flower of Something-Or-Other" (フラワー・オブ・なんちゃら, Furawā obu Nanchara); 16. "Soft & Cream" (ソフト&クリーム, Sofuto & Kurīmu); 17. "Cornered" (追い込まる, Oikomaru)
| 5 | May 9, 2014 | 978-4-08-879794-6 | December 8, 2020 (digital); November 14, 2023 (print) | 978-1-64659-929-5 (digital); 978-1-64651-879-1 (print) |
18. "I'm the Same Age as My Dad and My Uncle?!" (同い年～オレと親父とおじさんが～, Onaidoshi Ore to Oyaji to Ojisan ga); 19. "Death Zero 1" (亡零(1), Na Rei (1)); 20. "Death Zero 2" (亡零(2), Na Rei (2)); 21. "Death Zero 3" (亡零(3), Na Rei (3)); 22. "Death Zero 4" (亡零(4), Na Rei (4))
| 6 | December 19, 2014 | 978-4-08-879895-0 | December 22, 2020 (digital); January 16, 2024 (print) | 978-1-64659-930-1 (digital); 978-1-64651-880-7 (print) |
23. "Death Zero 5" (亡零(5), Na Rei (5)); 24. "Death Zero 6" (亡零(6), Na Rei (6)); 25. "Death Zero 7" (亡零(7), Na Rei (7)); 26. "Death Zero 8" (亡零(8), Na Rei (8)); 27. "Death Zero 9" (亡零(9), Na Rei (9)); 28. "Death Zero 10" (亡零(10), Na Rei (10)); 29. "Death Zero 11" (亡零(11), Na Rei (11))

=== Anime ===
After the last episode of Shaman King (2021), a sequel was announced. In March 2023, an anime television series adaptation of Shaman King: Flowers was confirmed. The staff from the main series are reprising their roles, with Mayuko Yamamoto designing the characters. It aired on TV Tokyo and its affiliates from January 10 to April 3, 2024. (Note: TV Tokyo listed the series premiere on January 9 at 24:00, which is effectively January 10 at midnight JST.) The opening theme song is "Turn the World", performed by Nana Mizuki, while the ending theme song is "Dear Panta Rhei" (ディア・パンタレイ, Dia Pantarei), performed by Sumire Uesaka. Netflix acquired the streaming rights to the series and it became available on the platform on April 21, 2024.

==== Episodes ====
| No. | Title | Directed by (Note: Information is taken from the ending credits of each episode.) | Written by | Storyboarded by | Original release date |
|---|---|---|---|---|---|
| 1 | "Asakura VS Hidden Asakura"; Transliteration: "Asakura VS Ura Asakura" (Japanese: 麻倉 VS 裏麻倉) | Toshihiko Sano | Shoji Yonemura | Takeshi Furuta | January 10, 2024 |
| 2 | "West Tokyo Sound Effect Festival"; Transliteration: "Nishi-Tokyo Gion Matsuri" (Japanese: 西東京擬音祭り) | Chako Sato | Fumihiko Shimo | Moe Sasaki; Katsuhiro Togawa | January 17, 2024 |
| 3 | "The Prodigal Shaman Returns"; Transliteration: "Kaettekita Oshama na Shāman" (Japanese: 帰ってきたおシャマなシャーマン) | Jun Shinohara | Jin Tanaka | Haru Shinomiya | January 24, 2024 |
| 4 | "Sense of Loss"; Transliteration: "Sōshitsukan" (Japanese: 喪失感) | Yuto Nakamura | Takeshi Furuta | Yuto Nakamura | January 31, 2024 |
| 5 | "Shocking Mall"; Transliteration: "Shokkingu Mōru" (Japanese: ショッキングモール) | Shotaro Kitamura | Shoji Yonemura | Shotaro Kitamura | February 7, 2024 |
| 6 | "An Oni Lies Down by the River"; Transliteration: "Oni, Kawahara ni Nekomu" (Japanese: 鬼、河原に寝込む) | Fumio Maezono | Fumihiko Shimo | Toshihiko Sano | February 14, 2024 |
| 7 | "Oni, Rumbling"; Transliteration: "Oni, Meidō" (Japanese: 鬼、鳴動) | Toshihiko Sano | Hitoshi Tanaka | Toshihiko Sano | February 21, 2024 |
| 8 | "Flower of Watchamacallit"; Transliteration: "Furawā obu Nanchara" (Japanese: フラワー・オブ・なんちゃら) | Higashio Yamauchi | Takeshi Furuta | Takeshi Furuta | February 28, 2024 |
| 9 | "The Same Age ~Me, My Father, and My Uncle!~"; Transliteration: "Onaidoshi ~Ore to Oyaji to Ojisan ga~" (Japanese: 同い年～オレと親父とおじさんが～) | Yuto Nakamura | Shoji Yonemura | Takeshi Furuta | March 6, 2024 |
| 10 | "Island of Death Zero"; Transliteration: "Bō Rei no Shima" (Japanese: 亡零の島) | Chako Sato; Moe Sasaki | Fumihiko Shimo | Moe Sasaki | March 13, 2024 |
| 11 | "Black Maiden"; Transliteration: "Kuro no Otome" (Japanese: 黒の乙女) | Katsuyuki Komai | Hitoshi Tanaka | Shotaro Kitamura | March 20, 2024 |
| 12 | "Just Cuz?"; Transliteration: "Nantonaku?" (Japanese: なんとなく？) | Masakazu Yoshimoto | Takeshi Furuta | Takeshi Furuta | March 27, 2024 |
| 13 | "It's Love!!!"; Transliteration: "Ai da! ! !" (Japanese: 愛だ！！！) | Toshihiko Sano | Shoji Yonemura | Takeshi Furuta | April 3, 2024 |
