= Shaman King: Zero =

Japanese manga and anime series

- Cover of the first volume

シャーマンキング0-zero- (Shāman Kingu 0-zero-)
- Genre: Adventure; Supernatural
- Manga
- Written by: Hiroyuki Takei
- Published by: Shueisha (former); Kodansha (current)
- English publisher: NA: Kodansha USA (digital)
- Imprint: Young Jump Comics (Shueisha); Magazine Edge KC (Kodansha)
- Magazine: Jump X
- Original run: November 10, 2011 – October 10, 2014
- Volumes: 2
- icon

Shaman King: Zero (Japanese: シャーマンキング0-zero-, Hepburn: Shāman Kingu 0-zero-) is a Japanese manga series written and illustrated by Hiroyuki Takei. It is a prequel to Takei's original manga series Shaman King. It was serialized in Shueisha's Jump X from November 2011 to October 2014, with its chapters collected in two tankōbon volumes.

== Publication ==
Written and illustrated by Hiroyuki Takei, Shaman King: Zero consists on a series of one-shot called "zero stories", detailing the backstories of Yoh and other characters. It was serialized in Shueisha's Jump X from November 10, 2011, to October 10, 2014. Shueisha collected its chapters in two tankōbon volumes, released on May 10, 2012, and January 19, 2015. Kodansha republished the series digitally in 2018 and released it in print on June 17, 2021.

In July 2020, Kodansha USA announced the digital English language release of the Shaman King's spin-offs, and Shaman King: Zero was originally scheduled to be released on August 4, 2020; however, it was delayed to October 13 of the same year. Seven days after the release of the first volume, the second and final volume was made available on October 20.

=== Volumes ===
| No. | Original release date | Original ISBN | English release date | English ISBN |
|---|---|---|---|---|
| 1 | May 10, 2012 | 978-4-08-879312-2 | October 13, 2020 | 978-1-64659-374-3 |
Episode - Yon. "New Genesis Paradise" (ニュー･シマネ・パラダイス, "Nyuu Shimane Paradaisu"); Episode - Ren. "Tears of the Ren"; Episode - Horohoro. "Tansu with Wolves" (たんす WITH WOLVES, "Tansu WITH WOLVES"); Episode - Lyserg. "A Little Wicker Man"; Episode - Hao. "Matagawa Under the Bridge" (摩多川 アンダー ザ ブリッジ, "Matagawa Andaa Za Burijji"); Bonus: Gag of New York
A series of one-shot depicting the backstories of Yoh, Ren, Horohoro and Lyserg. Joco has his one-shot replaced by Hao's subordinates.
| 2 | January 19, 2015 | 978-4-08-890071-1 | October 20, 2020 | 978-1-64659-624-9 |
Episode - Hao. "Mappa Doji II Part 1"; Episode - Hao. "Mappa Doji II Part 2"; Episode - Yohsuke. "YVS"; Episode - Sati. "Kadu, the Opulent Maharaja Part 1"; Episode - Sati. "Kadu, the Opulent Maharaja Part 2"; Episode - Sati. "Kadu, the Opulent Maharaja Part 3"; Episode - Iron Maiden Jeanne. "Merry Christmas at Sea"
