= Shaman King: Red Crimson =

Japanese manga series

- Cover of the first volume

SHAMAN KING レッドクリムゾン (Shāman Kingu Reddo Kurimuzon)
- Genre: Adventure; Supernatural
- Created by: Hiroyuki Takei
- Manga
- Written by: Jet Kusamura
- Published by: Kodansha
- English publisher: NA: Kodansha USA (digital)
- Imprint: Magazine Edge KC
- Magazine: Shōnen Magazine Edge
- Original run: June 15, 2018 – January 17, 2020
- Volumes: 4
- icon

Shaman King: Red Crimson (Japanese: SHAMAN KING レッドクリムゾン, Hepburn: Shāman Kingu Reddo Kurimuzon) is a Japanese manga series by Jet Kusamura. It is a spin-off to the original Shaman King manga series by Hiroyuki Takei. It was serialized in Kodansha's Shōnen Magazine Edge from June 2018 to January 2020, with its chapters collected in four tankōbon volumes.

== Publication ==
Written by Hiroyuki Takei and illustrated by Jet Kusamura, Shaman King: Red Crimson was launched in Shōnen Magazine Edge on June 15, 2018. The first tankōbon volume was released on November 15, 2018. After that, Red Crimson went on hiatus between January and May 2019. The manga finished on January 17, 2020, and its fourth and last tankōbon volume was published on March 17, 2020.

In July 2020, Kodansha USA announced the digital English language release of the Shaman King's spin-offs, and Shaman King: Red Crimson was originally scheduled to be released on August 25, 2020, however, it was delayed to October 27 of the same year. Its four volumes were then released between October 27 and November 24, 2020.

=== Volumes ===
| No. | Original release date | Original ISBN | English release date | English ISBN |
|---|---|---|---|---|
| 1 | November 15, 2018 | 978-4-06-514052-9 | October 27, 2020 | 978-1-64659-377-4 |
| 2 | August 16, 2019 | 978-4-06-516219-4 | November 3, 2020 | 978-1-64659-657-7 |
| 3 | November 15, 2019 | 978-4-06-517765-5 | November 17, 2020 | 978-1-64659-713-0 |
| 4 | March 17, 2020 | 978-4-06-518896-5 | November 24, 2020 | 978-1-64659-818-2 |
