= Shaman King =

Japanese manga series and its adaptations

- 32nd tankōbon volume cover (Jump Comics edition)

シャーマンキング (Shāman Kingu)
- Genre: Adventure; Supernatural
- Manga
- Written by: Hiroyuki Takei
- Published by: Shueisha (former); Kodansha (current)
- English publisher: AUS: Madman Entertainment; NA: Viz Media; (former); Kodansha USA; (current)
- Imprint: Jump Comics; (original tankōbon edition); Magazine Edge KC; (Kodansha edition)
- Magazine: Weekly Shōnen Jump
- English magazine: NA: Shonen Jump
- Original run: June 30, 1998 – August 30, 2004
- Volumes: 32 (original tankōbon edition); 35 (Kodansha edition)
- Anime television series
- Directed by: Seiji Mizushima
- Produced by: Fukashi Azuma; Naoki Sasada; Takatoshi Chino
- Written by: Katsuhiko Koide
- Music by: Toshiyuki Ōmori
- Studio: Xebec
- Licensed by: AUS: Madman Entertainment; EU: Fox Kids Europe/Jetix Europe; NA: Discotek Media
- Original network: TXN (TV Tokyo)
- English network: AU: Network Ten; AUS: Cartoon Network; BI: Fox Kids / Jetix; CA: YTV; PH: Cartoon Network; US: Fox (FoxBox / 4Kids TV)
- Original run: July 4, 2001 – September 25, 2002
- Episodes: 64
- Manga

Funbari Poem
- Written by: Hiroyuki Takei
- Published by: Shueisha
- English publisher: AUS: Madman Entertainment; NA: Viz Media; (former); Kodansha USA; (current)
- Magazine: Akamaru Jump
- Original run: June 15, 2003 – September 15, 2004
- Anime television series
- Directed by: Joji Furuta
- Written by: Shōji Yonemura
- Music by: Yuki Hayashi
- Studio: Bridge
- Licensed by: Netflix (streaming rights)
- Original network: TXN (TV Tokyo)
- Original run: April 1, 2021 – April 21, 2022
- Episodes: 52
- Related manga
- Zero (2011–14); Flowers (2012–14); The Super Star (2018–24); Red Crimson (2018–20); Marcos (2020–22); & a Garden (2020–22)
- icon

Shaman King (Japanese: シャーマンキング, Hepburn: Shāman Kingu (Note: The title is written in Latin and stylized in all caps in Japanese releases since 2018.)) is a Japanese manga series written and illustrated by Hiroyuki Takei. It follows the adventures of Yoh Asakura as he attempts to hone his shaman skills to become the Shaman King by winning the Shaman Fight. Takei chose shamanism as the main theme of the series because he wanted a topic that had never been attempted before in manga. The Shaman King manga was originally serialized in Shueisha's Weekly Shōnen Jump between June 1998 and August 2004. The individual chapters were collected and released in 32 tankōbon volumes. In 2017, Kodansha acquired the rights to the series and re-launched it on 35 e-book volumes in 2018, also published in print from 2020 to 2021.

A 64-episode anime television series adaptation, produced by NAS and Xebec, aired on TV Tokyo from July 2001 to September 2002. A 52-episode anime television series remake adaptation was produced by Bridge, and aired on TV Tokyo and other channels from April 2021 to April 2022. The manga has also been reprinted in a kanzenban edition, and has spawned various spin-offs and sequel manga, video games, a trading card game, and many types of related merchandise.

In North America, Viz Media obtained the English-language license for Shaman King and published its chapters in Shonen Jump magazine from March 2003 to August 2007. Kodansha USA re-licensed the series in 2020, and released it in both digital and physical formats. The anime series was licensed in North America by 4Kids Entertainment in 2003 and aired on FoxBox. Video games were released by 4Kids Entertainment in North America and Europe.

In Japan, the manga has been popular. By December 2023, it had over 41 million copies in circulation. Both the manga and anime have been featured, at various times, in "top ten" lists of their respective media. The first Shaman King anime series was very popular during its broadcast in Japan. Publications about manga and anime have praised the series.

== Plot ==
The plot of Shaman King revolves around Yoh Asakura, a shaman, a medium between the worlds of the living and the dead. Yoh seeks to become Shaman King, one able to channel the power of the Great Spirit to reshape the world as they wish, by winning the Shaman Fight, a tournament overseen by the Patch Tribe that occurs once every 500 years. Anna Kyoyama, Yoh's fiancée, soon enters the scene and prescribes a brutal training regimen to prepare him for the tournament. Thus begins the plot that will lead Yoh on a journey that will lead him to befriend Manta Oyamada and encounter other shamans: "Wooden Sword" Ryu, Tao Ren, Horohoro and Faust VIII.

Yoh's group travels to America to pass the final trial for the right to participate in the Shaman Fight, joined by Lyserg Diethel while encountering a group of shamans led by Yoh's estranged twin brother Hao Asakura, the reincarnation of a powerful shaman who wishes to eradicate all humans and create a world for shamans. The group also encounter the X-Laws, a group dedicated with killing Hao, with Lyserg joining them. Yoh's team is joined by Joco McDonnell (known as Chocolove McDonnell), as they engage in a series of three-man matches.

After several matches, only the teams that consist of Yoh's group, the X-Laws, and Hao's team remain. Due to Hao's level of power despite being supported by the Gandhara group in selecting Yoh, Ren, Horohoro, Lyserg, and Joco as the five legendary warriors, the teams forfeit the tournament in a gambit to stop Hao while he undergoes a process to merge with the Great Spirit while Gandhara acquires the Patch Tribe's five elemental spirits. Though Yoh and his friends defeat ten Patch tribesmen who are obligated to protect the new Shaman King, they are powerless against awaken Hao as he brings their souls and everyone they know within the Great Spirit before he commences with his goal of destroying all human life. But Yoh and his friends acquire the elemental spirits and battle Hao while joined by their friends and associates, revealing their goal is actually to ensure that Hao would not abuse his powers. It is revealed that the Great Spirit granted Hao's wish for someone to bring back his mother's spirit. With Anna's help, Hao's mother is brought to the Great Spirit. Convinced by his mother to forgive humanity for her death, Hao decides to postpone his plan to eradicate humans so he can observe how Yoh and his friends will change the world.

Seven years later, Hana Asakura waits at a station for the five legendary warriors and his parents, Yoh and Anna.

== Production ==
Before creating Shaman King, Takei, an assistant of Nobuhiro Watsuki's Rurouni Kenshin, exchanged ideas about the series with the other assistants which included the creator of One Piece, Eiichiro Oda. As a colleague of Watsuki, he worked primarily as a manga assistant, only focusing on his own projects during his days off. He was influenced by street art from hip-hop and rap culture, which is apparent in his manga artwork. For drawing, he used calligraphy inks and pen nibs. When illustrating, he used Copic brand color markers.

He chose shamanism as the principal topic of the series because he wanted to choose a subject that had never been approached in manga before. He said he incorporated his own personality and beliefs in Shaman King. He has an interest in the topic, and "choosing shamanism as the subject of this story seemed like a natural extension of that." For the title, he said he used "shaman", an English word, due to the fact that "the nuance is really great" and because he could not find a Japanese word with the accurate meaning of the word "shaman". Another reason to have shamanism as the main subject was because he could explore elements from different cultures and their relationship with the dead and the spirits.

Takei created the stories after he created the characters because he believed the "stories are born because of the existence of the characters". In addition, he felt that "the most important thing [to create a character] is to have originality". Through his characters he wanted to show different cultures, backgrounds and values. When asked "how do shamans of pacifistic religions ever win the Shaman Fight?" he answered that the Shaman Fight is fought using the "strength of the soul". Takei declared "the final message of Shaman King is that fighting is no good."

== Media ==
=== Manga ===
==== Shueisha edition ====
Written and illustrated by Hiroyuki Takei, Shaman King was serialized in Shueisha's shōnen manga magazine Weekly Shōnen Jump from June 30, 1998, (Note: It debuted in the magazine's 31st issue of 1998 (cover date July 13), released on June 30 of that same year.) to an abrupt and improvised end on August 30, 2004. (Note: It finished in the magazine's 40th issue of 2004 (cover date September 13), released on August 30 of that same year.) The first 275 chapters were collected into 31 tankōbon volumes, released from December 3, 1998, to October 4, 2004. The release of volume 32—intended for publication on December 3, 2004—was delayed and Shueisha reported they would only publish volume 32 if they receive evidence of demand from approximately 50,000 people. The release of the last ten chapters in tankōbon format happened on January 5, 2005. A spin-off to Shaman King, Funbari Poem (ふんばりの詩, Funbari no Uta), published in Akamaru Jump in 2003 and 2004, lasted for five chapters—all of which were included in volume 32. Taking place seven years after the end of the manga series, it features Hana Asakura, son of Yoh and Anna, and his journey with Ryu to find the Five Elemental Warriors for a reunion before the opening of the Funbari Hot Springs Inn.

Takei declared it was not a decrease in the series profitability that was the reason for its cancellation, but a "fatigue" he had been through because he was no more able to follow his fans' wishes. In the author's opinion, Shaman King was being "normalized" by the desire of his readers with the introduction of typical shōnen aspects and losing its originality. In 2007, he revealed he was planning to end the series with the finale he initially envisioned, to be published in another Shueisha magazine at the end of the year or at the beginning of 2008. Eventually the entire series was reprinted in 27 kanzenban volumes with the title Shaman King Kanzen-Ban (or "Perfect Edition"), concluding with the "true ending" to the series. The new series finale was also posted on the official kanzenban website, in addition to the print editions. The first volume of the Perfect Edition was released on March 4, 2008, with the last (volume 27) being published on April 3, 2009. Five years after the end of the series, when the Shaman King Kanzen-Ban was finished, Takei said, "After making the readers waiting [sic] so much for this, the last thing I wanted to do was to disappoint them". He thought the ending was a "huge responsibility". This edition served to make corrections and adjustments and, for Takei, it was something "fun," as it was different from scratch. Shaman King has also been published as part of the Shueisha Jump Remix series of magazine-style books. Sixteen volumes of Shaman King were released under the Shueisha Jump Remix series between April 1, 2011, and October 28, 2011.

Viz Media licensed the series for an English-language release in North America; the chapters initially serialized in the American Shonen Jump, beginning in third issue in 2003 and ceasing its serialization in the August 2007 issue. From then, it was exclusively published through graphic novel format and Viz said it was done in order to speed up the series' publication. The 32 volumes were released from August 6, 2003, to January 4, 2011. In Australasian region, Madman Entertainment licensed and published the series between February 10, 2009, and September 10, 2011.

==== Kodansha edition ====
In December 2017, Kodansha announced the company acquired the "Shaman King" trademark from Shueisha in Japan and Viz Media in North America. A website opened on January 1, 2018, to announce Kodansha's celebration for the series' 20th anniversary. For this purpose, Kodansha republished the original manga in 35 e-books, with new cover artwork, between May 1 and October 1, 2018. Kodansha republished these volumes in print, released every month; volumes 1–5 were published on June 17, 2020, after that, three volumes were published around the 17th of every month; volume 33 and 34 were published on April 15, 2021; the 35th and final volume was released on October 15 of that same year.

In July 2020, ComiXology and Kodansha USA announced that they would publish the thirty-five volumes of the new complete edition of the manga digitally starting in July 2020, however it was delayed to October of the same year. Kodansha USA also announced that they would release the series physically in twelve three-in-one omnibus edition volumes. The first volume was published on March 23, 2021, while the last was released on March 7, 2023.

==== Related series ====
A series of one-shot chapters, called "zero stories", later collected as Shaman King: Zero, detailing Yoh and other characters backstories, were serialized in Shueisha's Jump X from November 10, 2011, to October 10, 2014.

A sequel series, titled Shaman King: Flowers, centered on Hana Asakura's development as a shaman, was serialzied in Jump X from April 10, 2012, to October 10, 2014.

Another series, titled Shaman King: The Super Star, was preceded by three prologue chapters published in Kodansha's Shōnen Magazine Edge on April 17, 2018, and the series started in the same magazine on May 17 of that same year. The series concluded on Kodansha's Magazine Pocket app on November 23, 2024.

On November 30, 2024, it was announced that Takei is producing a final story arc, titled Shaman King Yard, whose launch date will be announced at a later date.

===== Spin-offs =====
A spin-off manga titled Shaman King: Red Crimson, by Jet Kusamura, was launched in Shonen Magazine Edge on June 15, 2018, and finished on January 17, 2020.

Another spin-off by Kusamura, titled Shaman King: Marcos, was serialized in Shōnen Magazine Edge from April 17, 2020, to June 17, 2022.

Another spin-off, conceptualized by Kusamura and illustrated by Kyo Nuesawa, titled Shaman King & a Garden, was serialized in Kodansha's shōjo manga magazine Nakayoshi from December 1, 2020, to May 2, 2022.

A spin-off manga, illustrated by Aya Tanaka and based on Kakeru Kobashiri's novel Shaman King Faust8: Eien no Eliza, started on Magazine Pocket on July 10, 2021; its last chapter was made available online on June 25, 2022. Its chapters were collected in three tankōbon volumes, released between October 15, 2021, and August 17, 2022.

=== Anime ===
==== First series (2001) ====
The episodes of the Shaman King anime series are directed by Seiji Mizushima and co-produced by TV Tokyo, NAS, and Xebec. The 64 episodes were aired between July 4, 2001, and September 25, 2002, on TV Tokyo. At an early stage of anime production, Takei himself helped the anime's staff. However, he soon left the staff due to his time limitations as he was working on the manga. In September 2020, Mizushima commented that the original anime material presented in the latter half of the show was not something he did on his own accord, and it was requested from Shaman King's original publisher Shueisha. The episodes were collected into 16 DVDs by King Records and released between October 30, 2001, and January 22, 2003. The DVDs were later collected and released in three box sets between August 27 and December 25, 2008.

4Kids Entertainment obtained the rights to broadcast the Shaman King anime in the United States, where it premiered on FoxBox on September 6, 2003. Three DVD compilations of the English adaptation were released by Funimation, in an uncut form, between October 19, 2004, and February 22, 2005. In June 2021, Discotek Media announced it had re-licensed the series. A Blu-ray Disc set, featuring the English dubbed and edited version, was released on October 26, 2021, and another Blu-ray Disc set, featuring the original uncut version and in Japanese with English subtitles, was released on January 31, 2023.

==== Second series (2021) ====
At Otakon 2015, former Madhouse president and then MAPPA president, Masao Maruyama, expressed his desire to work on a second anime adaptation of Shaman King. In February 2017, while answering a fan's question, Takei revealed on his official Twitter that he received an offer for another anime adaptation of Shaman King, but he turned the offer down because he was told that the new anime would not be able to use the first anime's voice actors and soundtrack music, although Takei hoped for another chance in the future.

In June 2020, a second anime television series was announced, which would adapt the 35 volumes of the new complete manga edition. The anime is produced by Bridge and directed by Joji Furuta, with series composition by Shōji Yonemura, character designs by Satohiko Sano and music composed by Yuki Hayashi. It aired from April 1, 2021, to April 21, 2022, on TV Tokyo. The series consists of 52 episodes from four Blu-ray Disc boxes, each with 13 episodes, released from August 25, 2021, to May 25, 2022. Netflix acquired the streaming rights to the series for an English dub, and it premiered on August 9, 2021, on the streaming platform.

=== Audio ===
The music for the first Shaman King anime adaptation was composed by Toshiyuki Omori. Two CD soundtracks were released; the first one was on March 27, 2002, titled Shaman King: Vocal Collection, and contains 14 tracks, including the first opening and ending themes in their original television lengths; the second one, Shaman King: Original Soundtrack, was released on June 26 of that same year, with an additional 20 tracks and the second opening theme "Northern Lights". Six character song CDs were released on March 24, 2004, sung by the voice actors as their respective characters. Three drama CDs have been produced for the series as well, featuring the original voice actors from the series.

=== Trading card game ===
A collectible card game based on the Shaman King series was produced by Tomy in Japan and released in the United States by Upper Deck in 2005. Upper Deck originally planned a mass market release of the game for January 2005, however, it was later announced that Blockbuster Video would have exclusive rights to sell the game from January 28, 2005, to February 15, 2005, after which it would be released to other retailers. In an interview with Upper Deck's Director of Brand and New Product Development, Cory Jones stated that it was the television show's underperformance and later cancellation which led to the cancellation of the trading card game.

A collaboration with Bushiroad's TCG "Cardfight!! Vanguard overDress" was announced on the Japanese Bushiroad TCG Strategy Presentation 2021 Summer on May 12, 2021. Trial Deck and Booster Pack Vol. 1 was released on November 5, 2021, and a Booster Pack Vol. 2 was released on April 22, 2022.

=== Video games ===
Thirteen video games based on the Shaman King series have been released. The first one, Shaman King Chō Senji Ryakketo Funbari Hen, was released on December 21, 2001. Although the games developed in Japan have not been released outside of that region, Konami and 4Kids Entertainment developed a series of games that were only released in North America and Europe. Characters of the Shaman King series have also made appearances in the games Jump Super Stars and Jump Ultimate Stars.

=== Other ===
Two light novels with the story by Hideki Mitsui and art by Hiroyuki Takei were released on December 25, 2001, and August 23, 2002. A fanbook titled Shaman King Official Fan Book: Mankin Book (シャーマンキング公式ファンブック｢マンキンブック｣, Shaman Kingu Kōshiki Fan Bukku Mankin Bukku) was released on April 30, 2004. Two guidebooks were released. The first, based on the original series and entitled Shaman King Character Book: Manjien (シャーマンキングキャラクターズブック｢万辞苑｣, Shaman Kingu Kyarakutāzu Bukku Manjien), was released on June 4, 2002. The second, called Shaman King Kazenban Final Official Guide Book Mantarite (シャーマンキング完全版 最終公式ガイドブック マンタリテ, Shaman Kingu Kazenban Saishū Kōshiki Gaidobukku Mantarite), for the kanzenban version of the series, was released exactly seven years later. Following Kodansha's acquisition of the series, a novelization written by Kakeru Kobashiri and titled Faust 8: Eien no Eliza (永遠のエリザ) was released on November 15, 2018, and a character book was published on November 30 of that same year.

== Reception ==
=== Public response ===
By November 2011, the original manga series of 32 volumes has sold over 26 million copies in Japan. By March 2020, the manga had over 35 million copies in circulation. By March 2021, the manga had over 38 million copies in circulation. By December 2023, it had over 41 million copies in circulation. The kanzenban volumes have been ranked in listings of best-selling manga in Japan, as well as its guidebook, both Zero volumes, Flowers first four volumes, and The Super Star first volume. Volumes of the series have been ranked in listings of best-selling manga in the United States such as The New York Times, Nielsen BookScan and Diamond Comic Distributors. In 2008, Shaman King was North America's 24th best manga property according to ICv2, based on sales for the entire year of 2008. The anime adaptation has also been featured several times in the Japanese TV ranking, with the last episode having a 9.5 percent television viewership rating. Shaman King was voted the sixth best anime of 2001 by Animage readers. In 2005, Japanese television network TV Asahi conducted a "Top 100" online web poll and the Shaman King anime adaptation placed 47th. Moreover, approximately 165 million cards from the Shaman King trading card game were sold in Japan.

=== Critical response ===
Justin Freeman from Anime News Network (ANN) criticized the first volume for relying too heavily on the spirits as a deus ex machina, stating that is what "places the series on the wrong path." On other hand, Alexander Hoffman of Comics Village declared "in this first novel, letting the relationships between Yoh, Amidamaru, and Manta flesh out is more important that developing every spiritual entity that shows up." Holly Ellingwood of Active Anime said she was fascinated by how Takei was capable of taking several myths and cultural beliefs and "blending them into the character backgrounds". Lori Henderson of Manga Life cited the fact every character, even the villains, "has a reason for fighting" and their "internal struggles" as well as the fights itself as the main reason why Shaman King is "an enjoyable title." A reviewer for The Star declared, praised the characters' development and Takei's capacity to create "new interesting ones each volume," commending "their backgrounds and unique personalities." Writing for ANN, John Jakala commented that he was struck with the "unique", "graffiti-style" visual of the series. Although labeled its art as "silly", Sheena McNeil from Sequential Start expressed that "it's smooth and nicely detailed with excellent expressions." McNeil deemed Takei did "a wonderful job of bringing shaman into the modern day but keeping it a story of fantasy". Ellingwood stated the series' "vibrant action", "imaginative plot twists and a creative world" makes it "a unique and stylish shōnen series."

Mania's Eduardo Chavez said that, Shaman King can "hit all the right buttons one volume" but "it could be a complete bore" in the next. School Library Journal's Cathleen Baxter commented that Shaman King has "nonstop action" with "typical shōnen characters and battle styles". The storyline is "easy to follow and will hold the reader's interest." Margaret Veira of Active Anime, however, argued that the storyline gets more complex as the series progresses, while comics critic Jason Thompson commented that from volume 20 it "seemed to veer off tracks". In addition of a decline on artwork in his opinion, the numbers of fights also decreased; Thompson wrote, "their enemy ... may be unbeatable by force alone, so the plot shifts away from battles and towards unexpected betrayals, character relationships, and clever (and confusing) schemes—rather than mere fighting techniques." The last volume, especially, "may leave some readers feeling cheated," said Leroy Douresseaux from Comic Book Bin. Thompson was also disappointed by the 2004 conclusion but he wrote that the kanzenban version has "a great ending", whose "transcendental climax is not too different from Katsuhiro Otomo's Akira, or for many American comics about beings with ultimate power."
