= Angel Leigh McCoy =

Game designer and fiction writer

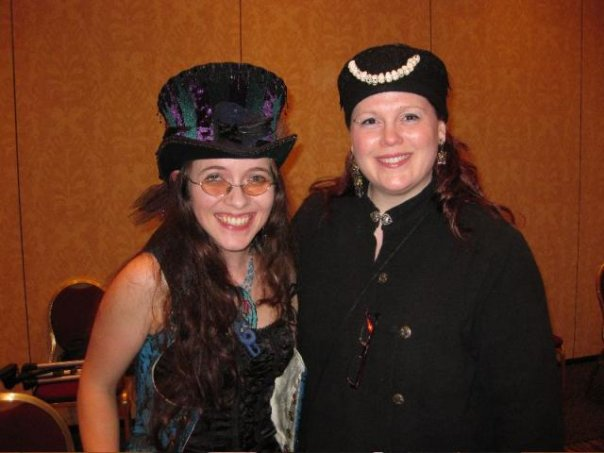
- Angel Leigh McCoy (right) with singer/songwriter S. J. Tucker, 2009
- Born: Angela Leigh McCoy; Elgin, Illinois, U.S.
- Education: University of Illinois Urbana-Champaign
- Occupations: Game designer and fiction writer

Angel Leigh McCoy is an American game designer and fiction writer based in Seattle, Washington.

== Early life and education ==
Originally from the Midwest, Angel Leigh McCoy grew up delving into fantasy and horror novels and won her first essay contest in sixth grade. She studied French Literature at the University of Illinois in Champaign-Urbana.

== Career ==
She is credited with published work in the role-playing games industry as far back as 1994. Over the years, she has designed RPG material for companies such as White Wolf, Wizards of the Coast, FASA, and Pinnacle Entertainment Group. In 2001, she was writing in the video game industry for Microsoft Game Studios, writing articles as Xbox.com correspondent Wireless Angel. She transferred to ArenaNet in 2007, where she was part of a team effort to make the MMORPG Guild Wars 2.

Her side projects have included: founding and providing creative direction for an indie game team (Games Omniverse LLC); short fiction writing; webmaster for the Horror Writers Association; producing the Wily Writers Speculative Fiction Podcast; and editing short story anthologies "Deep Cuts", and "Another Dimension Anthology".

== Publications ==
=== Novella ===
- Charlie Darwin, or the Trine of 1809, Nevermet Press, 2011.

=== Short fiction ===
McCoy has published short fiction in various anthologies and magazines, including:

- "Ravens in the Library", Quiet Thunder
- "Vile Things: Extreme Deviations of Horror", Comet Press
- "Masters of Horror Anthology", Triskaideka Books
- "Cobalt City Christmas", Timid Pirates Productions.
- "Fear of the Dark", HorrorBound
- Growing Dread: Biopunk Visions", by Timid Pirate Publishing
- Tales for Canterbury", Random Static
- Necrotic Tissue", issue 14, Stygian Publications

=== Computer game work ===
McCoy worked as a game reviewer and journalist for Microsoft Game Studios and Xbox. She currently works for ArenaNet as lore and narrative designer on Guild Wars 2.

=== Role-playing game work ===
McCoy's work in the role-playing game industry includes supplements for Wizards of the Coast's Forgotten Realms; FASA's Earthdawn; West End Games' World of Necroscope; Pinnacle Entertainment's Deadlands; and White Wolf's Mage: The Ascension, Vampire: The Masquerade, Hunter: The Reckoning and Changeling: The Dreaming.

Dungeons & Dragons product line, TSR

* The Magic of Faerun, co-author; 2000

Changeling: The Dreaming product line, White Wolf Publishing & ArtHaus Publishing

* Pooka Kithbook, ArtHaus Publishing; 1999
* Inanimae: The Secret Way, contributing author; 1998
* Satyr Kithbook, 1997
* Player's Guide, contributing author, 1997
* Second Edition, contributing author, 1997
* Storyteller's Guide, contributing author; 1995
* Shadows on the Hill, contributing author; 1995

Mage: The Ascension product line, White Wolf Publishing

* Manifesto, co-author, December 2002
* Hollow Ones Sourcebook, co-author, June 2002
* Mage Revised, contributing author, 1999
* The Bygone Bestiary, contributing author, 1998
* Technomancer's Toybox, contributing author, 1997
* Beyond the Barriers, contributing author, 1996

Vampire: The Masquerade product line, White Wolf Publishing

* Sins of the Blood, co-author, 2001
* World of Darkness, Vol. II, contributing author; 1996

EverQuest Role-Playing Game product line, White Wolf Publishing

* Monsters of Norrath, co-author, August 2002
* Player's Handbook, co-author, July 2002

Hunter: The Reckoning product line, White Wolf Publishing

* Defender Sourcebook, co-author; 1999
* Survival Guide, contributing author; 1999
* Hunter: The Reckoning, contributing author; 1999

Millennium's End product line, Chameleon Eclectic

* The Medellín Agent, co-author; 1997
* Overlay Accessory Kit, contributing author; 1994

Earthdawn product line, FASA Corporation

* Magic, contributing author; 1995
* Legends of Earthdawn, contributing author; 1995

Miscellaneous

* Aberrant: Project Utopia, White Wolf Publishing, contributing author; 1999
* Deadlands: Marshall Law, Pinnacle Entertainment Group, contributing author, 1996
* World of Necroscope: Book of Adventures, West End Games, contributing author; 1995
