= Jumanji 3 =

Jumanji 3 may refer to:

- Jumanji: Welcome to the Jungle (2017 film) third film in the Jumanji film franchise
- Jumanji: Open World (2026 film) fifth film in the Jumanji film franchise, third film in the reboot series

== See also ==
- Jumanji (disambiguation)
- Zathura (disambiguation)
