= Zoombies: Animales de la Muerte =

2013 video game

- Cover art
- Developer: High Voltage Software
- Publisher: High Voltage Software
- Platform: iOS
- Release: May 2, 2013
- Genre: Shooter
- Modes: Single-player, multiplayer

Zoombies: Animales de la Muerte is a shoot 'em up video game for iOS developed by and published by High Voltage Software in 2013.

== Gameplay ==
Zoombies: Animales de la Muerte has been described as a "crazy, over-the-top and gruesome brawler, multiplayer kind of Smash TV-style game".

In the game the player takes control of either Marco or Maria Mendoza, the grandchildren of the owner of a zoo in Mexico where the animals have been turned into zombies. Not only must the player kill the infected animals but they also need to recapture the non-infected ones set loose in the chaos. The game features a cartoonish visual style, but contains large amounts of blood and gore intended to be comedic and over-the-top.

== Development ==
The game was initially intended to be released as a downloadable WiiWare game for the Wii; however, challenges in trying to fit the game within Nintendo's WiiWare game size restrictions would have necessitated a disc-based retail release instead. In particular, High Voltage had trouble keeping the cut scenes and the large amount of spoken dialogue intact for the game.

In 2011, High Voltage Software announced that it had cancelled Animales de la Muerte's Wii release, and instead planned to release the title on PC, PlayStation 3 through PlayStation Network and Xbox 360 through Xbox Live Arcade, due to the fact the Wii's hardware limited the amount of on screen enemies, and that games released Xbox Live tend to outsell those on WiiWare.

The game uses the Quantum3 game engine, also used in High Voltage's The Conduit and Conduit 2.

High Voltage Software later announced that they had canceled the PS3 and Xbox 360 releases, and instead were going to release it to download on the App Store.

The game was originally slated to release on April 18, 2013, but was delayed to May 2, 2013.

== Reception ==
Reception

Aggregate score
Aggregator	Score
Metacritic	82/100

Review scores
Publication	Score
Gamezebo	5/5
Hyper	7/10
IGN	7.5/10
Pocket Gamer	4/5
Digital Spy	4/5

The game received "favorable" reviews according to the review aggregation website Metacritic.
