= Zoroaster (disambiguation) =

Zoroaster (Ancient Greek: Ζωροάστρης, Zōroástrēs) is the Greek form of the Persian Zarathustra, founder of Zoroastrianism.

Zoroaster may also refer to:

- Zoroaster da Peretola (c. 1462 – 1520), friend and collaborator of Leonardo Da Vinci
- Zoroaster (band), a sludge metal band from Atlanta, Georgia
- Zoroaster (album), a 1995 album by Acid King
- Zoroaster (1818 ship), a ship built at Kingston upon Hull in 1818 whose crew mutinied in 1836
- Zoroaster (echinoderm), genus of echinoderms in the family Zoroasteridae

== See also ==
- Zarathustra (disambiguation)
