= Tournament of Legends =

2010 video game

- Developer(s): High Voltage Software
- Publisher(s): Sega
- Engine: Quantum3
- Platform(s): Wii
- Release: AU: July 1, 2010; EU: July 2, 2010; NA: July 6, 2010
- Genre(s): Fighting
- Mode(s): Single-player, Multiplayer

Tournament of Legends is a fighting video game developed by High Voltage Software for the Wii console.

== Gameplay ==
Tournament of Legends has ten playable warriors based on Graeco-Roman mythology. The gameplay is described as a hybrid between traditional fighting games and the alternative puzzle-based gameplay of Punch Out!!. Players gesture using the Wii Remote and Nunchuk to initiate horizontal and vertical attacks, as well as execute quick-time events to avoid taking damage from periodic stage hazards. Button inputs allow the character to dodge, block, charge and use special attacks. To win a match, the player must defeat the opponent three times in two 90 second rounds. Breaks are allowed for fighters to regenerate armor and health.

The game does not have online multiplayer and features offline split-screen multiplayer instead.

== Development ==
Tournament of Legends went through a radical change in style in February 2010

Tournament of Legends uses an updated version of High Voltage's Quantum3 engine in use in their games The Conduit and The Grinder, which was also presented at E3 2009 alongside an early version of Legends, titled Gladiator A.D., which was much different than the final product, particularly with respect to age-appropriateness, theme and accessory support. Before Gladiator was retitled Legends, it employed a visual style not dissimilar to the film 300, including the use of slow motion during power attacks. Pursuing a more grounded, realistic and mature approach to the premise of gladiator combat, the game was planned to employ attacks and finishing moves with graphic violence consistent with the ESRB's Mature rating, as well as support the Wii MotionPlus for true-to-life motion controls. However, by the time High Voltage Studios announced in February 2010 that Sega would publish the game, as it had done for High Voltage's recent Wii games, the game was retitled as Tournament of Legends and re-themed into a more upbeat, colorful fighting game about mythological figures that would be less violent and support the Classic Controller instead of the Wii MotionPlus. In the following E3, close to the game's final release, High Voltage confirmed that they were looking into the possibility of porting the game to the PlayStation 3 and Xbox 360, but there were no further developments about the status of such versions in the years that followed.

== Reception ==
The game has received generally unfavorable reviews, with a Metacritic score of 45 based on 38 reviews. GameSpot awarded the game 4.5 out of ten and said "... unresponsive controls are the first thing you'll notice". Official Nintendo Magazine awarded it 40%, and remarked "this is just insulting". There were however positive reviews. Destructoid gave the game a 7.5 and said "[Tournament of Legends is] a good little fighter that makes good use of the console's interface and truly brings back the feeling of playing a fighting game in the nineties." Similarly, GamingCritics also praised the game's tone for being reminiscent of classic 90's fighting games and stated that "...both fighting newcomers and seasoned vets can get enjoyment out of the formula here" and awarded the game an 8 out of 10

== See also ==
- Rage of the Gladiator, a single-player, similar WiiWare game
