= Also sprach Zarathustra (disambiguation) =

Also sprach Zarathustra is an 1896 tone poem by Richard Strauss.

== Literature ==
- Thus Spoke Zarathustra, a book by Friedrich Nietzsche, published from 1883 to 1885
- Dies irae: Also sprach Zarathustra, a visual novel

== Music ==
- Also sprach Zarathustra, Op. 14, a 1911/12 work for baritone voice, three choruses and orchestra by Carl Orff
- "Also Sprach Zarathustra (2001)," a 1973 instrumental based on Strauss's "Sunrise," by Eumir Deodato from Prelude
- Also Sprach Zarathustra (album), a 2017 album by Laibach
- "Also sprach Zarathustra", a song by Prince from the Prince 20Ten tour
- Thus Spoke Zarathustra, a Deathcore band from Maryland

== Other uses ==
- Also Sprach Zarathustra (painting), a 1995–1997 cycle of paintings by Lena Hades
- Xenosaga Episode III: Also sprach Zarathustra, a video game in the Xenosaga series
- TED 2023, a 2012 short film alternatively titled Thus Spoke Zarathustra

== See also ==
- Zarathustra (disambiguation)
