= High Voltage Hot Rod Show =

2009 video game

- Developer: High Voltage Software
- Publisher: High Voltage Software
- Engine: Quantum 3
- Platform: Wii (WiiWare)
- Release: NA: January 19, 2009
- Genre: Racing
- Modes: Single-player, multiplayer

High Voltage Hot Rod Show is a WiiWare game developed by High Voltage Software. It was released in North America on January 19, 2009.

== Gameplay ==
High Voltage Hot Rod Show sees players racing hot rods around a track from an overhead view. The game also incorporates a stunt system to give players boosts that progressively increases their overall speed. The game is played over 6 tracks with 5 racers to choose from. It also includes up to 4 player split-screen offline multiplayer, and a Time Trial mode with online leaderboards.

The game features a number of control options for players, including steering their vehicle with the motion controls of the Wii Remote alone or with the thumbstick on the Nunchuk, with the game also supporting the Classic Controller and GameCube controllers.

== Development ==
High Voltage Hot Rod Show was inspired by games such as R.C. Pro-Am and Micro Machines, with the style of the characters and vehicles taking inspiration from Kustom Kulture and the artwork of Ed Roth and Kenny Howard amongst others.

The game runs on High Voltage Software's Quantum 3 game engine that was used in High Voltage's previous WiiWare game Gyrostarr. The game originally was to feature 8 tracks, but 2 were cut due to Nintendo's WiiWare game size restrictions.

== Reception ==
IGN scored the game a 6/10, noting the "inherently thin" content of the game and citing gameplay that follows a "very shallow, by-the-books design" that lacks polish. Wiiloveit.com gave it a 24/30, praising the "skill-oriented" gameplay, and "compelling trick system", but also commented that the game's lack of depth and "extended replay value" was its biggest flaw.
