= Zarathustra (disambiguation) =

Zarathustra (or Zarathushtra) is the Iranian prophet Zoroaster.

Zarathustra may also refer to:

- Zarathustra (album), a 1973 album by the Italian band Museo Rosenbach
- Zarathustra (horse), an Irish-bred Thoroughbred racehorse

== See also ==
- Also sprach Zarathustra (disambiguation)
- Thus Spoke Zarathustra (1880s), a philosophical novel by Friedrich Nietzsche
- Also sprach Zarathustra, a tone poem composed by Richard Strauss
- Also Sprach Zarathustra (painting) (1995–1997), a cycle of paintings by Lena Hades
- Zarathrusta (1991), a computer game for the Amiga
- Zathura (disambiguation)
