= Zathura (disambiguation) =

Zathura may refer to:

- Zathura, a 2002 children's book by Chris Van Allsburg
- Zathura: A Space Adventure, a 2005 film based on the book directed by Jon Favreau
- Zathura (video game) based on 2005 film

== See also ==
- Zarathustra (disambiguation)
- Jumanji (disambiguation)
- Jumanji 2 (disambiguation)
