= V.I.P. Casino: Blackjack =

2008 video game

- Developer: High Voltage Software
- Publisher: High Voltage Software
- Platform: Wii (WiiWare)
- Release: NA: May 12, 2008
- Modes: Single-player, Multiplayer

V.I.P. Casino: Blackjack is a WiiWare blackjack video game developed by High Voltage Software. It was a launch title for the North American debut of the service on May 12, 2008.

The game features the player's alter ego of "Mr Paradise" playing against the computer or up to three other human opponents to score the most cash at the table. The game features three dimensional graphics, controls that utilise the pointer and motion control functions of the Wii Remote, and an Xbox Live-inspired goal achievement mechanic that involves satisfying criteria such as winning a set amount of money or getting 10 winning hands in a row during the course of the game.

== Reception ==
IGN believed the game, despite its simplicity and lack of options such as the omission of online multiplayer, "still trumps other card games on the system". Chris Kohler of Wired thought it was well designed but preferred to have seen a title with a collection of different card games on the service.
