= NCAA Basketball: Final Four 97 =

1997 video game

- Developer: High Voltage Software
- Publisher: Mindscape Sports Advantage
- Platforms: Windows; PlayStation
- Release: 1997
- Genre: Basketball

NCAA Basketball: Final Four 97 is a 1997 basketball video game developed by High Voltage Software and published by Mindscape, under their Mindscape Sports Advantage label, for Windows and the PlayStation.

== Gameplay ==
NCAA Final Four Basketball is a team-oriented simulation of college basketball, which prioritizes coordinated plays and strategic defense. Players can use the controls for executing passes, blocks, and steals with intuitive button mapping. Offensive and defensive plays are accessible via shoulder buttons, allowing for dynamic in-game adjustments. Audio features collegiate fight songs, crowd reactions, court sounds, and commentary. The game includes 64 teams, multiple play modes, and archival NCAA footage.

== Reception ==
Reception

Review scores
Publication	Score
Computer Games Magazine	1.5/5
Computer Gaming World	2/5
GameSpot	6/10
Gamecenter	1/5
PC Gamer	71%
The Electric Playground	8.5/10

Computer Gaming World said "If you crave college hoops, pick up Haffner's COURT-SIDE BASKETBALL for stat play, or GTE's NCAA CHAMPIONSHIP BASKETBALL for action"

Computer Games Magazine said "Sorry Final Four 97 – your scholarship has been revoked. You can try to come back next year as a walk-on, but you’ll face an uphill battle for a spot on this team"
