= The Walking Dead (Hunter: The Reckoning) =

Role-playing game supplement

The Walking Dead is a 2000 role-playing game supplement published by White Wolf Publishing for Hunter: The Reckoning.

== Contents ==
The Walking Dead is a supplement in which ghosts and zombies are explored as key antagonists, blending in-character Hunter accounts with detailed guidance and stories to help players and Storytellers portray the undead in their games.

== Reviews ==
- Pyramid
- Rue Morgue #16
- Magia i Miecz #2000-07/08 p. 17
- DXP #2 (Apr 2000) p. 5
- Dosdediez V2 #15 (Aug 2000) p. 21
- Dosdediez V2 #21 (Nov 2002) p. 20
- D20 #12 p. 6-7
