= Hunter: The Reckoning Survival Guide =

Role-playing game supplement

- Designers: Bruce Baugh, E. Jonathan Bennett, Michael Lee, Angel McCoy, Deena McKinney, Wayne Peacock, Greg Stolze, Andy Woodworth, Pete Woodworth
- Publishers: White Wolf Publishing
- Publication: 1999
- Genres: Tabletop role-playing game supplement
- Systems: Storyteller System
- Parent games: Hunter: The Reckoning
- Series: World of Darkness
- ISBN: 1-56504-737-0

Hunter: The Reckoning Survival Guide is a 1999 role-playing game supplement for Hunter: The Reckoning published by White Wolf Publishing.

== Contents ==
Hunter: Survival Guide is a supplement in which the perspective of Hunters on the World of Darkness is explored.

== Reception ==
Hunter: Survival Guide was reviewed in the online second version of Pyramid which said "The Hunter Survival Guide breaks away from the "first sourcebook" jinx, and provides a mostly very good guide to the monsters of the world, and the people who hunt them."

== Reviews ==
- Backstab #19
- Backstab #35 (Nov 2001) p. 103 (as "Le manuel de survie")
- Envoyer #55 (May 2001) (as "Jäger: Überlebenshandbuch")
- Magia i Miecz #2000-01 p. 17-18
