= Jumanji 2 =

Jumanji 2 may refer to:

- Zathura (2002), the sequel to the 1981 book Jumanji
- Zathura: A Space Adventure (2005), the second film in the Jumanji film franchise
- Jumanji: Welcome to the Jungle (2017), the sequel to the 1995 film Jumanji

== See also ==
- Jumanji (disambiguation)
- Zathura (disambiguation)
