= Wii Speak =

Microphone accessory for the Wii

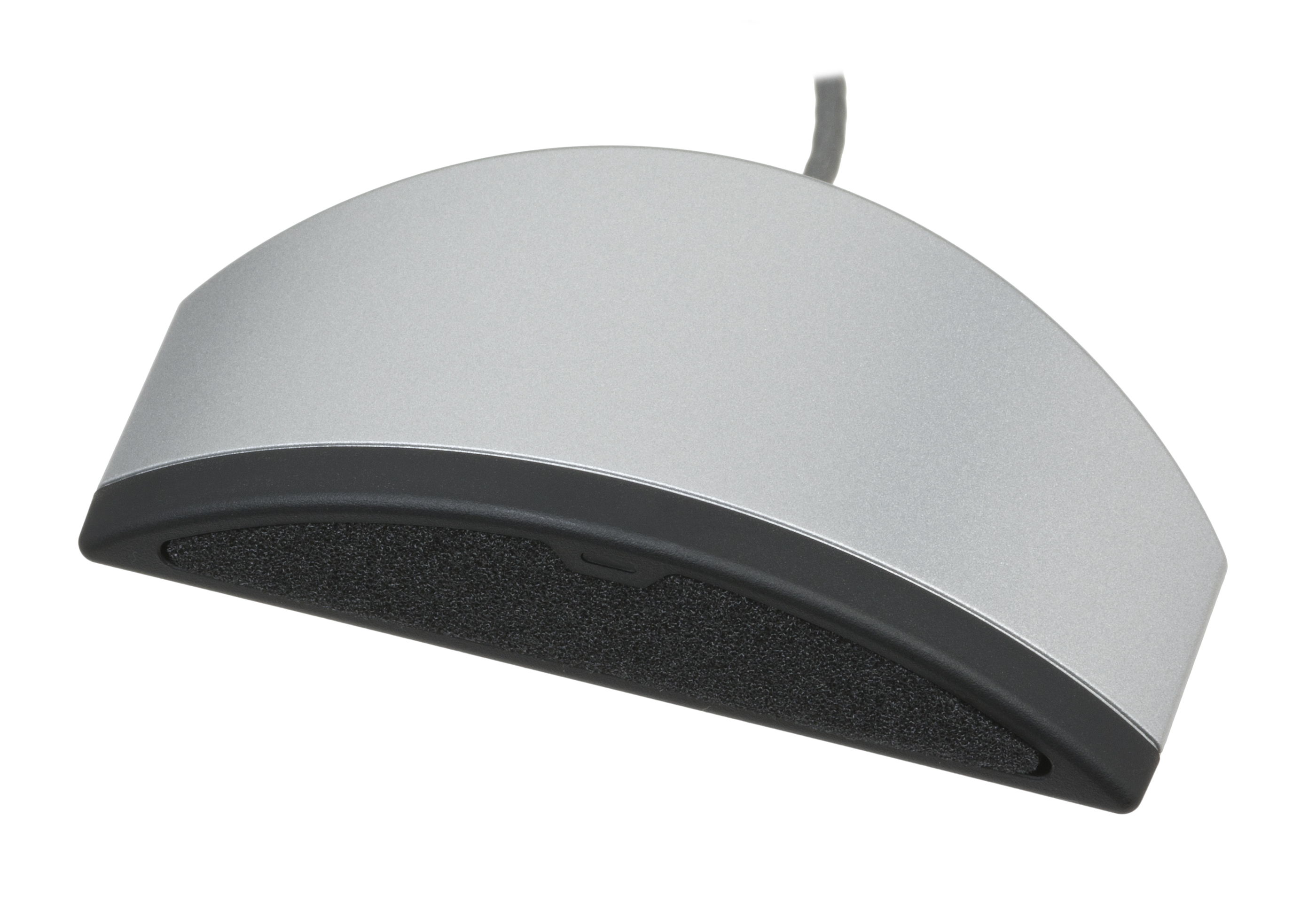
- Manufacturer: Nintendo
- Type: Microphone
- Released: NA: November 16, 2008; EU: December 5, 2008

The Wii Speak is a microphone accessory for Nintendo's Wii home video game console. Connected to the console via USB, the device can be placed near the video display, which allowed voice chat to be conducted within entire rooms across multiple households. The device features an LED indicating when the microphone is active.

The Wii Speak was announced at Nintendo's 2008 E3 media briefing. It was released on its own, as well as in a bundle alongside Animal Crossing: City Folk, on November 16, 2008 in North America, and on December 5, 2008 in Europe.

The Wii Speak accessory was succeeded by the embedded microphone on the Wii U's GamePad controller. Nevertheless, the Wii Speak hardware remains compatible with the same games that were previously compatible with the Wii on Wii U.

== Design ==
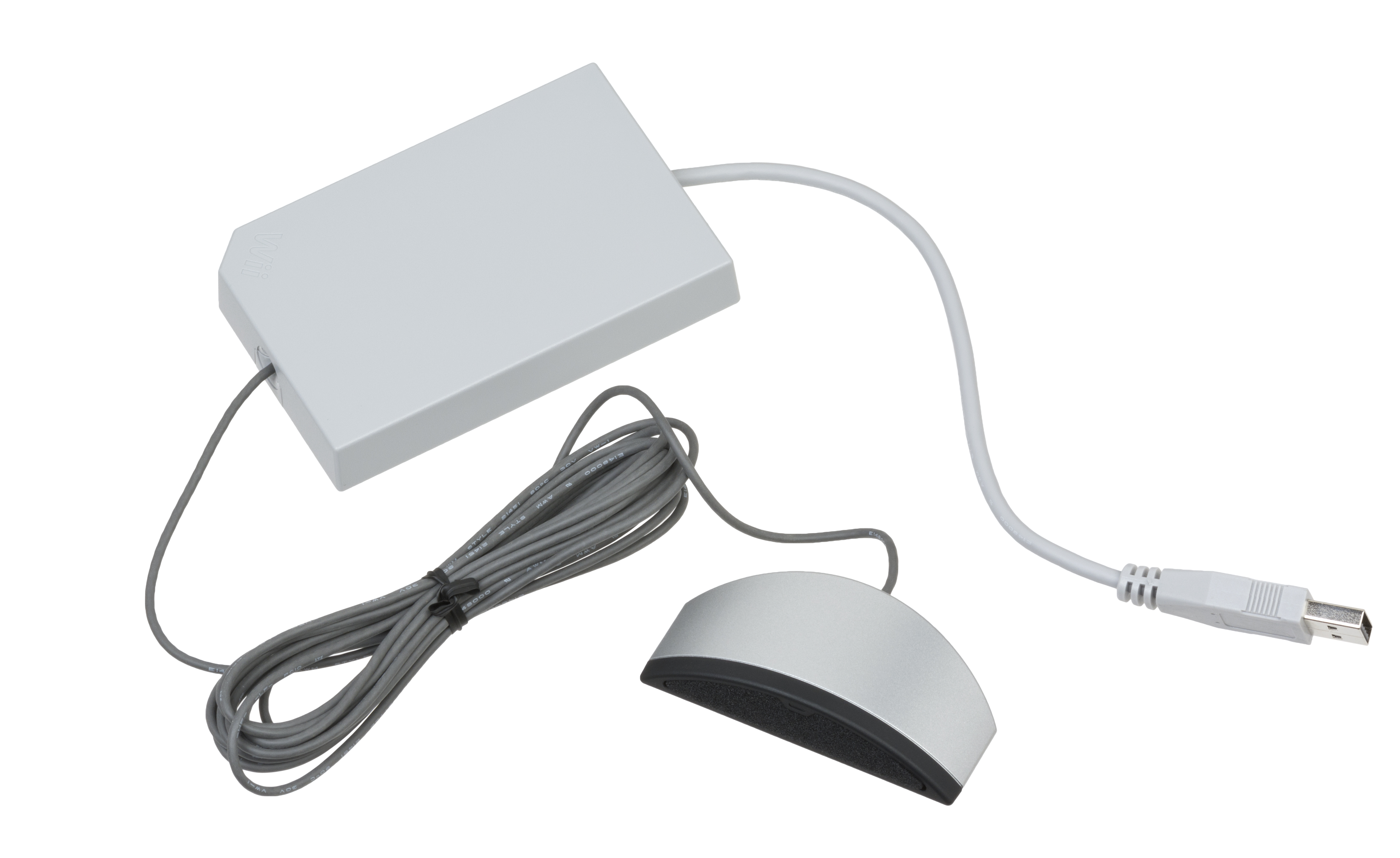
The Wii Speak shown with its USB cord

According to Shigeru Miyamoto, the microphone was designed to "clearly capture many different voices being spoken in a room at the same time and convey that over the Internet." Addressing concerns over background noise due to the placement of the microphone near a television set, Animal Crossing: City Folk producer Katsuya Eguchi stated that the device was designed to filter out video game sound from the audio speakers. Miyamoto noted at the time that the quality of the noise filtering functionality in the Wii Speak is "very good", which may have contributed to the cost of the device. An on/off switch was originally planned, but the microphone was ultimately designed to only turn on when a compatible game wants access to it.

== Software ==
In addition to the standalone accessory, the Wii Speak was also made available as a bundle alongside Animal Crossing: City Folk. However, it was not originally Nintendo's intention to release such a bundled product.

At E3 2008, when asked why the device would not be bundled with City Folk, Nintendo senior managing director Shigeru Miyamoto replied that cost was the factor behind the decision, adding that some users may prefer playing the game without a microphone, and that others may want to use Wii Speak who are not interested in buying City Folk. Despite these initial statements however, Nintendo later revealed that a bundle of the Wii Speak, along with City Folk, would indeed be released. This bundle was a limited edition, and was released the same day as the standalone products.

=== Wii Speak Channel ===
Wii Speak Channel
- Developer: Nintendo
- Type: Online voice-only chat
- Launched: December 5, 2008
- Last updated: March 27, 2009
- Platform: Wii

Wii Speak Channel

On October 2, 2008, Nintendo announced that Wii Speak would have its own Wii Channel. The Wii Speak Channel could be unlocked for download with a 16-digit "Wii Download Ticket" included with the Wii Speak package upon purchase. Only those who entered the 16-digit code on the Wii Shop Channel (prior to its closure) were allowed to download the Wii Speak Channel, which officially launched on December 5, 2008. If for any reason the download ticket was lost, or used on another Wii, users could at that time obtain a new download ticket by emailing Nintendo. Prior to launch, customers could download the "Wii Speak Channel Download Assistant", a channel which gave information about the release of the Wii Speak Channel. Following the release, the Download Assistant updated and converted itself into the actual channel.

The Wii Speak Channel allows users to chat with Wii Friends (who also had the Wii Speak and the Wii Speak Channel) within one of four "rooms". There was no limit to the number of people that could be in each "room". Each user was represented by their Mii avatar, whose mouths were lip synced to the user's spoken words. In addition, users were also able to leave audio messages on the Wii message board for other users, as well as make audio captions for their stored photos. Users could also share photo slideshows and comment on them.

The Wii Speak Channel was also available via the Wii U's "Wii Mode", though it had no functional use, as the Wii U's Wii Mode has no friend codes. However, the Wii Speak peripheral itself does function on the Wii U with games that support it. The Wii Speak channel is no longer available for download due to being discontinued, and any download codes that are used result in an error message stating that the channel is no longer available.

The Wii Speak Channel ceased functionality after May 20, 2014 when the free Nintendo Wi-Fi Connection service was discontinued. The Wii Speak Channel was succeeded by the Wii U Chat videochat app for the Wii U.

=== Compatible games ===
| Title | Developer | Publisher | Wii Speak's Use | Release date | | | |
| Title | Developer | Publisher | Wii Speak's Use | N. America | Japan | Europe | Australia |
|---|---|---|---|---|---|---|---|
| Animal Crossing: City Folk | Nintendo EAD | Nintendo | Voice Chat | November 16, 2008 | November 20, 2008 | December 5, 2008 | December 4, 2008 |
| The Conduit | High Voltage Software | Sega | Voice Chat | June 23, 2009 | | | |
| Endless Ocean 2: Adventures of the Deep | Arika | Nintendo | Voice Chat | February 22, 2010 | September 17, 2009 | February 5, 2010 | February 25, 2010 |
| Jeopardy! | Pipeworks Software | THQ | Inputting answers | November 2, 2010 | | | |
| Mix Superstar (Note: Game was only available on the WiiWare download service.) | Digital Leisure | Digital Leisure | Inserting voice clips into tracks | November 8, 2010 | | | |
| Momotarō Dentetsu Nisenjū: Sengoku Ishin no Hīrō Daishūgō! no Maki | Hudson | Hudson | Voice Chat | | November 26, 2009 | | |
| Monster Hunter Tri | Capcom | Capcom (NA) Nintendo (EU) | Voice Chat | April 20, 2010 | August 1, 2009 (No Wii Speak support) | April 23, 2010 | April 29, 2010 |
| NBA 2K10 | Visual Concepts | 2K Sports | Voice Chat | November 9, 2009 | | November 27, 2009 | |
| NBA 2K11 | Visual Concepts | 2K Sports | Voice Chat | October 5, 2010 | October 14, 2010 | October 8, 2010 | October 8, 2010 |
| NHL 2K10 | Visual Concepts | 2K Sports | Voice Chat | September 15, 2009 | | October 23, 2009 | |
| NHL 2K11 | Visual Concepts | 2K Sports | Voice Chat | August 24, 2010 | | October 8, 2010 | |
| Tetris Party Deluxe | Hudson Soft | Majesco | Voice Chat | June 1, 2010 | | September 3, 2010 | October 14, 2010 |
| Uno | Gameloft | Gameloft | Voice Chat | January 25, 2010 | October 20, 2009 | November 6, 2009 | |
| Wheel of Fortune | Pipeworks Software | THQ | Inputting answers and recording voice clips for your character | November 2, 2010 | | November 19, 2010 | |
