= Evasive Space =

2009 video game

- Developer: High Voltage Software
- Publisher: Akinai Games
- Engine: Quantum3
- Platform: Wii
- Release: NA: February 16, 2009; JP: April 7, 2009
- Genre: Action
- Modes: Single-player, multiplayer

Evasive Space is an action video game developed by High Voltage Software and published by Akinai Games. It was released as WiiWare through the Wii Shop Channel. It was released in North America on February 16, 2009 and in Japan on April 7, 2009.

== Gameplay ==
Gameplay in Evasive Space

Evasive Space is an action game with 3D graphics procedurally generated by High Voltage Software's Quantum3 game engine. Often erroneously labeled as a classic-style shooter, players guide their ship by using the Wii Remote's infrared pointer to avoid obstacles and enemies and collect items and power-ups. The player points the cursor in the direction they wish to travel and depress the throttle to move. The further the cursor is from the ship, the faster it travels. When the ship hits a wall or obstacle, it becomes stunned momentarily. Obstacles include enemy turrets, black holes, asteroids, and narrow environments which restrict the player's movement. Items include Energy Cells responsible for powering the ship, Chronospheres that rewind back 5 seconds to the mission timer, and Diodes that can unlock up to six ship upgrades, the first of which being an energy shield that protects the ship from damage. Some levels are completed by collecting a set number of items, and other require the player to guide their ship to the end of the level before a time limit expires.

=== Multiplayer ===
Six multiplayer modes are included in the game, which allows up to four people to compete with each other offline. The game also includes a Nintendo Wi-Fi Connection leaderboard feature for players to compare the time scores they receive after successfully completing levels.

== Plot ==
Evasive Space focuses on the character Konki, the Stellar Guardian, who must regain the Constellation Stones from Dr. Dark Matter and his band of space thieves. By recovering the scattered stones, Konki can restore light to the galaxy. The story plays out across 20 levels divided into four different environments.

== Reception ==
Reception

Aggregate scores
Aggregator	Score
GameRankings	58.44%
Metacritic	59/100

Review scores
Publication	Score
1Up.com	C+
Destructoid	8/10
GameSpot	3/10
IGN	6.9/10
Nintendo Life	5/10

Evasive Space has received mixed reviews. Destructoid awarded the game an 8/10, saying that it "looks and feels very polished" and is an "interesting title with fun gameplay." IGN gave the game a 6.9/10, citing issues with the responsiveness of the controls and sometimes frustrating level design. 1UP.com called it clever and smartly designed but potentially frustrating (a "rage machine") for some players. WiiWare World thought the game had a few good ideas but overall was marred by a "frustratingly obtuse" control scheme.
