= Le Vamp =

2013 video game

- Developer: High Voltage Software
- Publisher: High Voltage Software
- Platforms: iOS, Android
- Release: iOS; March 14, 2013; Android; July 11, 2013
- Genre: Endless runner
- Mode: Single-player

Le Vamp is an endless runner developed and published by High Voltage Software for iOS and Android in 2013.

== Reception ==
Reception

Aggregate score
Aggregator	Score
Metacritic	72/100

Review scores
Publication	Score
Pocket Gamer	3.5/5
TouchArcade	4/5
Digital Spy	3/5

The iOS version received average reviews according to the review aggregation website Metacritic.
