= Lena Hades =

Artist

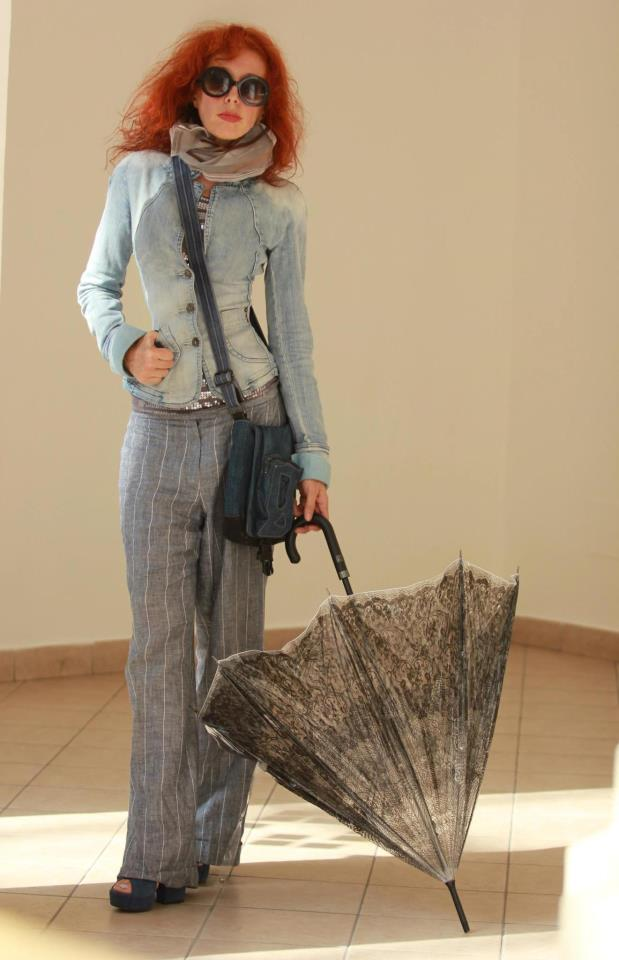
- Hades in 2013
- Born: Lena Alekseevna Hades; October 2, 1959 (age 67); Siberia
- Education: Moscow State Pedagogical University
- Occupation: Artist

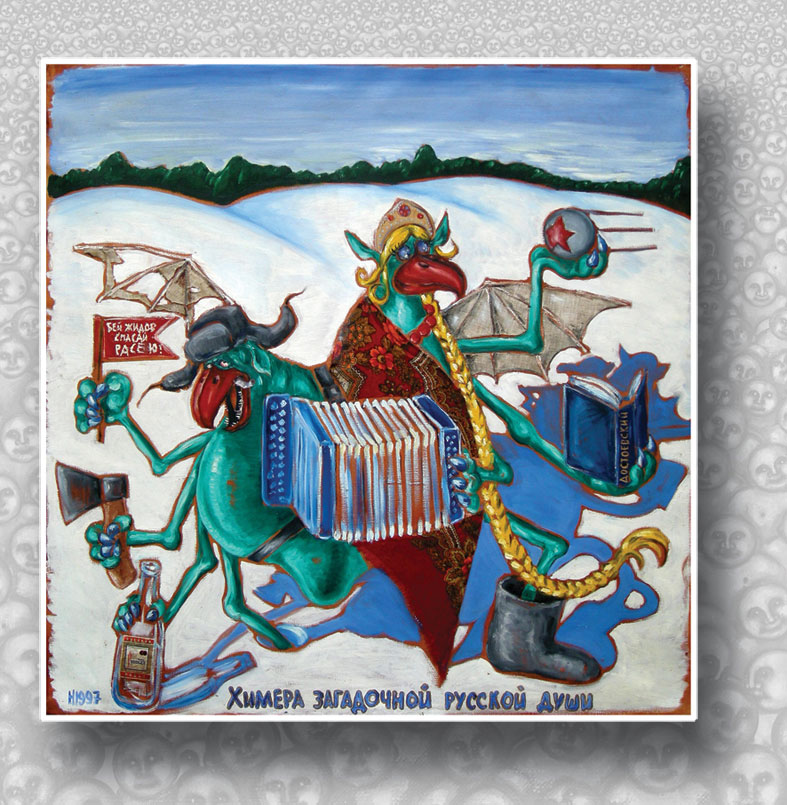
Химера загадочной русской души

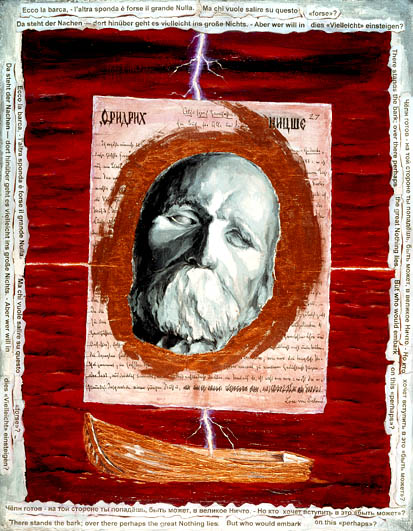
Portrait of Friedrich Nietzsche

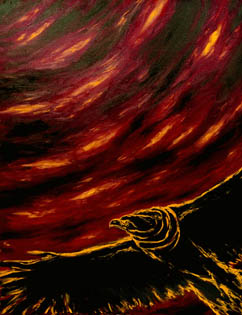
Eagle and snake. From Lena Hades' cycle Thus spake Zarathustra. 1997, 137 × 177cm.

Lena Alekseevna Hades (Russian: Лена Алексеевна Хейдиз; born October 2, 1959) is a Russian artist and writer.

== Life and career ==
Lena Hades was born in Siberia on October 2, 1959. Her father worked as communication engineer, her mother was a physician. At the age of 35 her father got ill with multiple sclerosis and died at the age of 51. Hades took care of her father until his death in 1985. Her father's disease triggered her interest in the concept of death, and also in the philosophical problems of existence – the main topics of her creative works.

Hades graduated from Moscow State Pedagogical University in 1982 (Faculty of Physics and Mathematics); she also completed foreign language courses and worked as a translator for many years. At age 35, she decided to become an artist, and in 1995 moved to Germany. In Cologne, she created her first works and sold her first painting. In 1995–1997 she created more than 30 paintings devoted to "Thus Spoke Zarathustra" by Nietzsche. For her, these works are visual metaphors.

In 1997, Hades' oil painting and graphic cycle "Also Sprach Zarathustra" was exhibited in the Institute of Philosophy of Russian Academy of Sciences. In 2004, the Russian Academy of Sciences published a bilingual edition of "Thus Spoke Zarathustra" by Nietzsche, with the cover and the jacket of the book decorated with two paintings by Hades. The book also contains twenty other works from this cycle. Her paintings are in collections of the Moscow Museum of Modern Art and the Igor Markin Museum of contemporary art. The works of the above series were also exhibited at the First Moscow Biennale of contemporary art in 2005, in the Institute of Philosophy of the Russian Academy of Sciences in 1997 and in the State Kashyrka Gallery in 1998.

Hades has also been charged with "extremism" and been interrogated by prosecutors. She has been threatened with jail time and accused of "inciting hatred against Russia".

== Notable works ==
Hades is known for "Also Sprach Zarathustra", as well as two other paintings, which Russian nationalists deem Russophobian. In March 2008 a group of Russian nationalists took legal action against her, claiming her paintings provoke "racial and nationalistic hostility and hatred". The first work is called Welcome to Russia (1999). It was purchased by Igor Markin Museum of Contemporary Art, the name of the other painting is The Chimera of the mysterious Russian soul (1996). It was exhibited only once, at the Second Moscow Biennale of contemporary art in 2005. The nationalists were offended by Hades' depiction of the Russian soul as a cartoonish creature with clichéd attributes of Russian everyday life — a bottle of vodka, a model of Sputnik — and by the crudely painted text in Welcome that indicts the Russian character as simultaneously overaggressive and alarmingly God-fearing.

In June 2010, Hades was summoned to testify on the above two paintings to Basmannaya prosecutor's office, Moscow, she was threatened to be tried and heavily fined, since she could have been accused of hatred and hostility propaganda.

On July 6, 2012, Hades announced a hunger strike supporting the Pussy Riot band. The hunger strike lasted 25 days and resulted in severe health problems. Hades also created a series of portraits of Pussy Riot.

On March 3, 2015, Hades started an art marathon in memory of Boris Nemtsov. She said she would stop drawing the assassinated politician's portraits when whoever ordered his murder was arrested and brought to trial.

Hades also has autobiographic series of paintings called "A Girl with bows". Her work called A girl with bows, the woman that mows. The Dance is a personal confession in which she shows the poly-semantic world of the kingdom of death. Aides is the god of the dead. This depiction of the kingdom of death is not related to the Christian world, but is closer to Nietzsche's image of hell.

=== Books ===
- 미래를 창조하는 나 – 차라투스트라는 이렇게 말했다 (고전읽기 [I'm making the future] (in Korean). Seoul: Mirae N Culture Group. 2009. ISBN 978-89-378-4498-0.
- Hades, Lena (2010). Chimeras by Hades: incite. London: Alexander Kerensky Museum Publishing. ISBN 978-1-906408-07-7.
