= Hunter: The Reckoning =

Tabletop role-playing game

- First edition cover by Brian Glass
- Designers: First edition; Andrew Bates, Phil Brucato, Ken Cliffe, Greg Fountain, Ed Hall, Jess Heinig, Michael Lee, Richard Thomas, Mike Tinney, Stewart Wieck; 5th Edition; Justin Achilli
- Publishers: White Wolf Publishing (ed. 1); Renegade Game Studios (H5)
- Publication: November 1999 (1st ed.) June 5, 2022 (5th ed.)
- Systems: Storyteller System
- Series: World of Darkness
- Website: Official website
- ISBN: 1-56504-735-4 (ed. 1): 978-1-737496-24-3 (H5)

Hunter: The Reckoning is a horror tabletop role-playing game, and the sixth main game in the World of Darkness series. It was originally released by White Wolf Publishing in November 1999 as part of their Year of the Reckoning line. A second edition, based on the Vampire: The Masquerade 5th edition ruleset, was released in 2022 by Renegade Game Studios. It is supported by a series of supplementary books which expand the game's setting and describe types of characters.

Led by a gamemaster, players role-play as human characters in modern times who learn of the existence of the supernatural, such as vampires, werewolves, and mages, and fight back as monster hunters. Having little knowledge of the supernatural and no one but each other to rely on, they share information and organize through the internet forum Hunter-Net. The hunters are divided into several creeds, which determine their philosophies and outlooks on the hunt, and what sets of powers they learn.

The game was designed with themes of righteous fury, paranoia, hope, and retaining a normal life. The game was critically well received and considered appealing to both returning players and those new to the series, and became one of White Wolf Publishing's most successful and popular intellectual properties. It has seen several adaptations, including a fiction anthology, a novel series, several video games, and a live-action role-playing game.

== Overview ==
Hunter: The Reckoning is a horror tabletop role-playing game set in modern times, in which players take the roles of human characters who become aware of the existence of the supernatural, including vampires, werewolves, and ghosts, and fight back as monster hunters. In the game's first edition, this revelation comes from the voice of beings called Heralds or Messengers, who imbue the player characters with insight and power; in Hunter: The Reckoning 5th Edition (H5), hunters do not become imbued. The hunters are mostly unorganized and know little of the supernatural, and have to rely on each other as the world at large does not know about it: they often communicate and share information through the anonymous internet forum Hunter-Net, which is managed by a hunter known as Witness1. Because of their lack of knowledge, they typically have to study their targets before attacking if they want to survive the encounter.

Players create hunter characters with a character sheet, assigning points to various attributes to determine what they are good at, and deciding which of several creeds they belong to: Avengers, Defenders, Hermits, Innocents, Judges, Martyrs, Redeemers, Visionaries, or Waywards. The choice of creed determines characters' philosophies, how they relate to the hunt, what their weaknesses are, and which powers they will learn. The hunters' powers are called edges, and are learned through paths, where the first power often is the most powerful; in the first edition, edges are supernatural, which is not necessarily the case in H5. Led by a storyteller, (Note: The person leading the game is called the "storyteller" in World of Darkness games, a role called "gamemaster" or "dungeon master" in other role-playing games.) players role-play as these characters. The game uses the Storyteller System, where the outcomes of attempted actions are determined through the character's values in relevant attributes and through rolling dice pools.

== Production ==
Hunter: The Reckoning was originally designed by Andrew Bates, Phil Brucato, Ken Cliffe, Greg Fountain, Ed Hall, Jess Heinig, Michael Lee, Richard Thomas, Mike Tinney, and Stewart Wieck, with art direction by Richard Thomas and cover art by Brian Glass. It was inspired by Ends of Empire, the ending of the earlier World of Darkness game Wraith: The Oblivion, which depicts the underworld being engulfed, leading to an influx of spirits and zombies in the human world. The development team designed the game with the concept of righteous fury as its main theme; other themes include paranoia and the fear of the unknown, the effect of monster-hunting on one's humanity, finding hope and continuing fighting in seemingly hopeless situations, maintaining a normal life, and how power can corrupt people. According to Cliffe, the inspiration for the hunters mainly came from average people, as he considered underdogs to make for better heroes than superheroes do. The game was mostly written in-character, to show rather than tell what it is like to be a hunter. Although the game includes monsters appearing in other World of Darkness games, they do not necessarily abide the same rules as in their home games, creating an experience that reflects how hunters do not know how supernaturals work. For example, a vampire in Hunter: The Reckoning may be more brutal and vile than one in Vampire: The Masquerade and may have other abilities and weaknesses.

A second edition, titled Hunter: The Reckoning 5th Edition (H5), is in development by a team that includes the series' creative lead Justin Achilli and art director Tomas Arfert. Achilli described the game as realizing the aspirational and hopeful aspects of the setting, through human characters who are given a fighting chance and can change the world. Development of H5 began during the production of the fifth edition of Werewolf: The Apocalypse, to be able to expand the line-up of active World of Darkness games despite the delays in Werewolf's development, and was inspired by the dramatic action of Werewolf. The hunters in H5 were conceived as street-level groups, rather than the large vampire-hunter organizations seen as antagonists in Vampire: The Masquerade, who instead are portrayed as secondary antagonists to the H5 hunters who want to preserve the status quo.

=== Release ===
Hunter: The Reckoning was originally released in November 1999 by White Wolf Publishing as a 300-page hardcover book, as the sixth main game in the World of Darkness series and as part of their Year of the Reckoning line of books released throughout 1999. It has since also been released as an e-book, and has been translated into other languages including Brazilian Portuguese, French, and German. Prior to the H5 revival, the game line was ended with the cross-over event Time of Judgment in 2004. H5 is planned to be published by Renegade Game Studios in Q2 2022, and is planned to be supported by the online toolset World of Darkness Nexus, which includes a rules and lore compendium, tools for creating and managing characters, matchmaking, and video chat functionality.

The game is supported by supplementary books, which describe the setting and types of monsters and hunters; the publisher did not create adventure modules for Hunter: The Reckoning, as sourcebooks were more popular with World of Darkness players. Like the game itself, the supplementary books are presented as taking place in real time.

== Books ==
=== First edition (1999–2003) ===
Game books for Hunter: The Reckoning's first edition
Title	Original release	ISBN	Publisher	Notes
Hunter: The Reckoning	November 1999	1-56504-735-4	White Wolf Publishing	Core rulebook
Hunter: The Reckoning Storytellers Companion	1999	1-56504-736-2	White Wolf Publishing	Guide to the setting for storytellers. Bundled with storyteller screen.
Hunter: The Reckoning Survival Guide	1999	1-56504-737-0	White Wolf Publishing	Guide to the game for players
Hunter-Book: Innocent	May 2000	1-56504-742-7	White Wolf Publishing	Sourcebook for the hunter creed the Innocents
Hunter-Book: Martyr	November 2000	1-56504-745-1	White Wolf Publishing	Sourcebook for the hunter creed the Martyrs
Hunter-Book: Redeemer	December 2000	1-56504-746-X	White Wolf Publishing	Sourcebook for the hunter creed the Redeemers
Hunter-Book: Avenger	2000	1-56504-739-7	White Wolf Publishing	Sourcebook for the hunter creed the Avengers
Hunter-Book: Judge	2000	1-56504-743-5	White Wolf Publishing	Sourcebook for the hunter creed the Judges
The Walking Dead	2000	1-56504-741-9	White Wolf Publishing	Sourcebook about the undead
Hunter-Book: Hermit	June 2001	1-56504-748-6	White Wolf Publishing	Sourcebook for the hunter creed the Hermits
Hunter: The Reckoning Players Guide	July 2001	1-58846-700-7	White Wolf Publishing	Guide to the game for players, containing options and inspirations for player characters
Hunter: Holy War	September 2001	1-58846-702-3	White Wolf Publishing	Sourcebook for Middle Eastern hunters
Hunter: The Reckoning Storytellers Handbook	October 2001	1-58846-701-5	White Wolf Publishing	Guide for storytellers on running games
Hunter-Book: Defender	2001	1-56504-740-0	White Wolf Publishing	Sourcebook for the hunter creed the Defenders
Hunter-Book: Visionary	2001	1-56504-747-8	White Wolf Publishing	Sourcebook for the hunter creed the Visionaries
Utopia	January 2002	1-58846-706-6	White Wolf Publishing	Sourcebook about a potential future for hunters, where a sector is freed from monsters
Hunter: First Contact	March 2002	1-58846-704-X	White Wolf Publishing	Sourcebook about hunters' relationships with organizations linked to the supernatural
The Nocturnal	April 2002	1-58846-705-8	White Wolf Publishing	Sourcebook about vampires
Fall from Grace	September 2002	1-58846-708-2	White Wolf Publishing	Sourcebook about extremist hunters
The Moonstruck	September 2002	1-58846-707-4	White Wolf Publishing	Sourcebook about werewolves
Hunter-Book: Wayward	2002	1-58846-703-1	White Wolf Publishing	Sourcebook for the hunter creed the Waywards
The Spellbound	January 2003	1-58846-709-0	White Wolf Publishing	Sourcebook about mages
The Infernal	May 2003	1-58846-710-4	White Wolf Publishing	Sourcebook about demons
Urban Legends	September 2003	1-58846-711-2	White Wolf Publishing	Sourcebook about rumors and urban legends

=== 5th Edition (2022–present) ===
Game books for Hunter: The Reckoning 5th Edition
Title	Original release	ISBN	Publisher	Notes
Hunter: The Reckoning	October 2022	978-1-737496-24-3	Renegade Game Studios	Core rulebook
Lines Drawn in Blood	July 11, 2023	978-1-957311-32-6	Renegade Game Studios	Chronicle book
Alma Matters	August 21, 2024	978-1-957311-41-8	Renegade Game Studios	Sourcebook
Incognito Report	May 15, 2025	978-1-957311-58-6	Renegade Game Studios	Sourcebook
Apostates	June 15, 2025	978-1-957311-61-6	Renegade Game Studios	Sourcebook
Legacy of Defiance	PreRelease JUNE 2026		Renegade Game Studios	Sourcebook

== Reception ==
Reception
Review scores
Source	Rating
Backstab	4/5 (ed. 1)
Casus Belli	10/12 (ed. 1)
Dosdediez	3/5 (ed. 1)

The game's illustrations were criticized for incongruity with its themes. Pictured: the cover art for the Storytellers Companion.

Hunter: The Reckoning was critically well received, and considered appealing both to new players and those with prior experience with the World of Darkness series. It became one of White Wolf Publishing's most successful and popular intellectual properties, and was in 2003 described by IGN as one of "the most successful tabletop RPGs of the modern era". In Spain, the first edition debuted as the sixth highest selling new role-playing game of the March–May 2001 period. Spelkult looked forward to H5, calling it a welcome reunion.

The gameplay was generally well received, (Note: See Backstab, Casus Belli, Dosdediez, Dragão Brasil, and Science Fiction Age) with Backstab describing it as an efficient and classic system with nothing to complain about, and Casus Belli considering it similar to Call of Cthulhu, but with fresh additions to the game design. Dragão Brasil considered the game's system easy to understand, with well-written explanations and examples, making the core rulebook among the best in the World of Darkness series. Envoyer similarly called it the most successful World of Darkness system, with a convincing presentation and everything needed to play and manage a game. One commonly criticized point was the division of the hunters into several creeds, which critics considered too systematic of a representation of philosophies and too similar to previous World of Darkness games' handling of character types, such as the vampire clans in Vampire: The Masquerade. The hunters' powers were positively received, with Dosdediez appreciating the variety of them, and Science Fiction Age liking how hunters, unlike player characters in other World of Darkness games, get their most effective powers first, necessitated by how the characters have little knowledge of the supernatural at first; Meanwhile, Magia i Miecz found it strange how the hunters themselves use supernatural means to fight off supernatural beings.

Critics liked the game's setting and mood, (Note: See Backstab, Dosdediez, Dragão Brasil, and Science Fiction Age) finding them to bring a lot of potential for role-play and for exciting campaigns with oppressive tones: Dragão Brasil recommended the game to anyone who likes mature, human stories with emotional depth. The portrayal of supernaturals was also well received: critics enjoyed seeing them depicted from a new perspective compared to in their respective home games, and how they are written to retain a sense of mystery. (Note: See Casus Belli, Dosdediez, Dragão Brasil, and Science Fiction Age) Dosdediez further recommended using the game together with the World of Darkness supplement The Bygone Bestiary, to further surprise players with unusual monsters. The game's illustrations and cover art, although considered well made, were frequently criticized for feeling incongruous with the stated themes of the game, depicting what Science Fiction Age described as "muscled-up special forces types" rather than regular people, encouraging a play-style of immediately resorting to violent options. (Note: See Casus Belli, Dosdediez, Dragão Brasil, Pyramid, and Science Fiction Age) Backstab also criticized the backgrounds used in the first-edition rulebook for at times making the text difficult to read.

== Related media ==
White Wolf Publishing released the Hunter: The Reckoning fiction anthology Inherit the Earth in 2001, which was edited by Stewart Wieck and contains nine stories. They also published the six-part novel series Predator & Prey by Carl Bowen and Gherbod Fleming in 2000–2002, consisting of Vampire, Judge, Werewolf, Jury, Mage, and Executioner. Hunter: Apocrypha, a replica of a fictional book appearing in the Hunter: The Reckoning setting, was written by Tim Dedopulos and illustrated by Drew Tucker, and published in August 2000.

Laws of the Reckoning, an adaptation of Hunter: The Reckoning for the live-action role-playing game Mind's Eye Theatre, was developed by Cynthia Summers and Alyson Gaul and written by Peter Woodworth, and released in 2002. Dark Ages: Inquisitor, a supplement for the tabletop role-playing game Dark Ages: Vampire for playing as hunters in 1230, was released in December 2002. Hunter: The Vigil, a tabletop role-playing game in White Wolf Publishing's Chronicles of Darkness series, was released in 2008, and takes inspiration from Hunter: The Reckoning along with Dark Ages: Inquisitor and the Vampire: The Masquerade book The Hunters Hunted.

High Voltage Software developed three hack-and-slash video game adaptations: Hunter: The Reckoning in 2002, and Wayward and Redeemer in 2003. They performed moderately well commercially, attributed by GameFan in part to the pre-existing fan base for the tabletop game, and were met by critical reviews ranging from average to positive. After Paradox Interactive acquired the World of Darkness series in 2015, they said that they wanted to create a fourth Hunter: The Reckoning video game; in 2023, the interactive fiction game Hunter: The Reckoning – The Beast of Glenkildove by Choice of Games was announced.

Uwe Boll acquired the movie rights for the 2002 video game in 2004. The film was planned to be directed by Boll, produced by Shawn Williamson, and written by David Schneider and Drew Daywalt, with shooting planned to take place in British Columbia.

YouTube channel Bruva Alfabusa and their animation team Ogre Poppenang Productions features an animated web-series called Hunter: The Parenting, set in the year 2006 in Norfolk, England, focusing on the story of a family of hunters as they contend with vampires and werewolves, and other supernatural monsters from the two other game lines. In contrast to other Hunter: The Reckoning media, the show has a more distinctly comedic tone, emphasizing absurdity, references, and visual gags, though this doesn't prevent the show from having more serious drama and horror elements, nor more intimate moments of vulnerability between characters. While it is animated, most of the series is uploaded in the form of audio dramas, which serve as a vehicle for character development and exploration, and worldbuilding. The show has a dedicated cult following online, and is openly acknowledged by Paradox Interactive, who have a link on their World of Darkness website to the "Intended Watch-Order" playlist on YouTube. The main cast of characters and a small handful of side characters are inspired by an older series on the channel called If The Emperor Had A Text-to-Speech Device (another series which had amassed a sizable fanbase during its run), often abbreviated as TTS, which was based on the setting of Warhammer 40,000.
