= Hunter: The Reckoning – Redeemer =

2003 hack-and-slash video game

- European cover art featuring Kaylie Winter
- Developer: High Voltage Software
- Publisher: Vivendi Universal Games (Note: Released in PAL regions under the Sierra Entertainment brand.)
- Producer: Chad Kent
- Designer: David A. Rodriguez
- Programmers: Nigel Rankin; John Sanderson
- Artist: Matt Corso
- Series: Hunter: The Reckoning
- Platform: Xbox
- Release: NA: October 28, 2003; EU: November 21, 2003
- Genres: Hack and slash, third-person shooter
- Modes: Single-player, multiplayer

Hunter: The Reckoning – Redeemer is a 2003 hack-and-slash shooter video game developed by High Voltage Software and published by Vivendi Universal Games for the Xbox. It is based on the tabletop role-playing game Hunter: The Reckoning, and is part of the larger World of Darkness series. It is the third Hunter video game, following Hunter: The Reckoning (2002) and Wayward (2003).

Players take the roles of hunters, who fight undead hordes using ranged weapons, melee weapons, and magic. The story is set ten years after the first Hunter: The Reckoning video game, and sees the original's four hunters team up with the new hunter Kaylie to investigate incidents in the town of Ashcroft connected to the Genefex Corporation and werewolves.

The planning of the game began in the middle of the development of the first Hunter: The Reckoning video game, and was heavily influenced by player feedback. Redeemer performed moderately well commercially, and saw a mixed critical response, with critics praising the game's multiplayer mode and visuals, and enjoying the story and addition of Kaylie, but criticizing the level design as confusing.

== Gameplay ==
The player fights hordes of undead, as hunters with different strengths. Here, the hunter Kaylie fights zombies with her sword.

Hunter: The Reckoning – Redeemer is a hack-and-slash shooter game in which players fight large amounts of enemies in a third-person perspective, either in a single-player mode or in a multiplayer mode supporting up to four players. The gameplay is very similar to that of the previous two Hunter: The Reckoning video games, and sees players fight undead hordes with ranged or melee weapons, including powerful limited-use weapons found in levels; players also have access to magic spells called edges, with effects such as healing or increasing one's attack power. The game is divided into levels, which have different objectives, including traversing an area, escorting characters, freeing innocents from zombies, clearing an area from monsters, and defeating bosses.

Players initially have five hunter characters to choose from, each with their own specialties and edges: Kaylie is a Redeemer, and is focused on ranged attacks; Deuce is an Avenger, with strong melee attacks; Kassandra is a Martyr, who moves quickly; Father Cortez is a Judge, and is focused on magic attacks; and Samantha is a Defender, and balanced. The player can also unlock two more characters – the Wayward hunter Joshua and the Risen wraith Carpenter – by fulfilling certain conditions; by collecting monster cards dropped by some enemies, the player can also play the game as those monsters. As players gain experience, they are given skill points to allocate between their characters' statistics, to customize them in accordance to their preferred playstyle, such as making a slow character faster; when a player wants to switch characters, they can transfer the skill points to the new character. The characters' appearances can also be customized with clothing.

== Plot ==
Redeemer is set in the World of Darkness – a gothic-punk interpretation of the real world, where monsters exist and hide in plain sight – and takes place in the town of Ashcroft, ten years after the events of the first game. The team of hunters from the first Hunter video game – Deuce, Samantha, Father Cortez, and Kassandra – have teamed up with Kaylie Winter, who they saved as a child during the first game and who has been raised by Father Cortez. Kaylie spies on the Genefex Corporation's CEO Xavier Lucien as he oversees a shipment of products, when werewolves enter the warehouse and corner him. Kaylie and the other hunters drive the werewolves away, and they learn that werewolves have been attacking Genefex shipments for some time, since Genefex began hunting them in addition to the undead.

As Genefex shipments to Ripper's Nightclub have been intercepted, the hunters go there to investigate, and learn that it is a haven for vampires. They meet their nemesis there, the risen wraith Carpenter, who says he had to make a deal with a powerful being to be able to return to the world of the living after the events of the previous game, and that he is required to kill them. They defeat him and his vampire henchwomen in battle, and he tells them that the deal involved him having to oversee the club and mix an unknown substance shipped from Genefex Labs into the drinks served at the club, but that he does not work for Lucien. Having failed at his objective, he flees.

After protecting Genefex Labs from a werewolf attack and noticing that one of Lucien's staff is not human, the hunters sneak inside to investigate. They find and free the captive werewolf leader, who tells them that the substance is a spiritual poison used in Genefex products to turn humans into slaves to a powerful entity that Lucien has sold his soul to. The hunters join forces with the werewolves, and turn off Genefex pumps contaminating Ashcroft's water supply with the poison.

Lucien discovers that the werewolf leader has been freed, and sends his security team to the forest to kill the werewolves. The hunters help defend the werewolves and innocent humans, and infiltrate Genefex's headquarters, placing explosives throughout the building. They confront Lucien, who with the power of the entity has become demonic, and defeat him in battle. Father Cortez stays behind to kill Lucien, and the others escape the building before the explosives detonate.

== Development ==
The game was developed by High Voltage Software, and was produced by Chad Kent, designed by David A. Rodriguez, and programmed by Nigel Rankin and John Sanderson, with art by Matt Corso. The development team started planning for Redeemer while in the middle of developing the first Hunter: The Reckoning; following its release, they visited internet message boards every day to see what players liked and disliked about the game, which they collated to know what to focus on for Redeemer. Based on this, they focused on improving the camera, and designed the game to be more replayable, with a lot of unlockable content, and with a more in-depth system for character customization.

The developers made heavy use of visuals and audio in creating the horror for the game, with several dark and dank environments enhanced with sound effects for the supernatural beings players encounter. Their approach to horror was also heavily affected by how powerful the main characters are, as players are aware that they can defeat a few monsters with ease: they designed the game to let the player become comfortable in that feeling before starting to introduce hordes of undead, intending for a foreboding feeling of uncertainty as to whether they have the resources to overcome the threat, followed by introducing a new and more powerful enemy in a more disturbing environment as a scare. Kent described it as a challenge to create good and mature horror in a video game format, due to the convention of fast-paced and ever-increasing action beginning early on, unlike in film, where the audiences accept some time for establishing the plot and characters before the first real scare; due to the high costs of producing AAA video games, publishers are often unwilling to deviate from these conventions.

Redeemer was announced in early 2003, and was published by Vivendi Universal Games for the Xbox on October 28, 2003, in North America and on November 21, 2003, in Europe. Microsoft Japan published the game in Japan on January 22, 2004, as part of their "World Collection" line. After Paradox Interactive acquired the World of Darkness series in 2015, they said that they wanted to create a fourth Hunter: The Reckoning video game; in 2023, the interactive fiction game Hunter: The Reckoning – The Beast of Glenkildove by Choice of Games was announced.

== Reception ==
Reception

Aggregate score
Aggregator	Score
Metacritic	72/100

Review scores
Publication	Score
Famitsu	25/40
Game Informer	8/10
GamePro	3.5/5
GameRevolution	2.5/5
GameSpot	7/10
GameSpy	2/5
GameZone	8.5/10
IGN	8.2/10
Official Xbox Magazine (US)	7.4/10

Redeemer was met with "mixed or average reviews" according to the review aggregator Metacritic, but was described by IGN as one of the best co-operative multiplayer games on the Xbox and as "the Gauntlet of the new millennia". The game performed moderately well commercially, which GameFan in part attributed to the pre-existing fan base of the Hunter: The Reckoning tabletop game it is based on.

The gameplay was generally well received, with critics calling it engaging and easy to learn; Game Informer described the combat as good for players who like zombie games but find the Resident Evil series too slow. GameSpy criticized the aiming as too difficult, however, and found the input method for the combo system confusing and counter-intuitive. The multiplayer mode was regarded as fun and as the best way to play the game, (Note: See GamePro, GameRevolution, GameSpy, GameZone, and IGN) while the single-player mode was criticized as repetitious and boring; Official Xbox Magazine considered the two modes to be unevenly balanced, however, with the single-player being too easy and the multiplayer too difficult. A common criticism was that the level designs often were unintentionally confusing, unintuitive, and labyrinthine, (Note: See GameRevolution, GameSpy, GameZone, IGN, and Official Xbox Magazine) leading GameSpy to wish for an in-game map function.

Critics enjoyed the story and its spooky mood, and called it, although cheesy, an improvement over Wayward. The cutscenes were praised for being well animated and moody, and for drawing players into the story and setting; IGN criticized the presentation of dialogue outside of cutscenes, for using generic pop-up windows and lacking voice acting. The character Kaylie was well received, and called a Batman-style "badass" that made for a good addition to the hunters. (Note: See GameRevolution, GameSpy, GameZone, IGN, and Official Xbox Magazine)

The visuals were praised, with GameZone calling the game a "visual treat", and several critics calling the environments beautiful, detailed, and atmospheric. (Note: See Game Informer, GameSpy, GameZone, and IGN) The visual effects were also well received, especially the magic effects and the real-time lighting and shadows. (Note: See Game Informer, GameRevolution, GameSpot, and Official Xbox Magazine) The character models were praised, and were frequently called "sharp" and detailed with good and smooth animations. (Note: See GameRevolution, GameZone, IGN, and Official Xbox Magazine) Kaylie's design was positively received for being attractive and sexy, as was Kassandra's, although Official Xbox Magazine questioned the practicality of Kaylie wearing a miniskirt and a low-cut top while fighting.

The audio saw a mixed critical response, with sound effects and music called decent or average; GameZone and IGN criticized the sound effects as lacking, with inauthentic-sounding guns, and with the vampire women being the only enemies whose sound effects stand out, while Official Xbox Magazine called the sound "solid". GameZone and Game Informer liked the music, calling it atmospheric and fitting, although GamePro criticized its use of synth and dance beats. Response to the voice acting varied: GameZone and GameSpot liked it, whereas GameSpy and GameRevolution called it terrible.
