= Hunter: The Reckoning – Wayward =

2003 hack-and-slash video game

- North American cover art featuring (left to right) Samantha, Deuce, Joshua, Father Cortez, and Kassandra
- Developer: High Voltage Software
- Publisher: Vivendi Universal Games (Note: Released in PAL regions under the Sierra Entertainment brand.)
- Producer: Chad Kent
- Designer: Warren Capps
- Programmer: Anthony Glueck
- Artist: Joe Hamell
- Series: Hunter: The Reckoning
- Platform: PlayStation 2
- Release: NA: September 9, 2003; EU: October 17, 2003
- Genres: Hack and slash, third-person shooter
- Modes: Single-player, multiplayer

Hunter: The Reckoning – Wayward is a 2003 hack-and-slash shooter video game developed by High Voltage Software and published by Vivendi Universal Games for the PlayStation 2. It is based on the tabletop role-playing game Hunter: The Reckoning, and is part of the larger World of Darkness series. It is a sequel to the 2002 video game Hunter: The Reckoning, and was followed by Redeemer in 2003.

Players control hunters, progressing through missions and areas non-linearly while fighting enemies with physical and magical attacks. The story is set two years after the previous game, and sees the hunters returning to the town of Ashcroft following the appearance of a witch's cult and supernatural beings.

The game was announced in early 2003 as a port of the previous Hunter: The Reckoning game, but with a new story, and with gameplay changes made based on player feedback. It was released to "mixed or average" reception, with reviewers frequently criticizing how the game's multiplayer mode only supports two concurrent players, compared to the previous game's four, but praising the controls and gameplay improvements.

== Gameplay ==
Players fight large numbers of enemies at once, as hunters with different strengths. Here, the quick Martyr shoots enemies with her dual pistols.

Hunter: The Reckoning – Wayward is a hack-and-slash third-person shooter game in which 1–2 players take the roles of hunters while fighting large amounts of enemies, including undead and cultists, using melee and ranged attacks, and magical abilities called "edges". Edges have several kinds of effects, such as enhancing one's attacks, or protecting oneself. Using them consumes some of a character's conviction meter, which is recharged with gems that fallen enemies drop. In addition to the basic melee and ranged weapons each character have, players can also collect special weapons with limited ammunition, such as flare guns and shotguns.

The characters belong to different classes that play differently. These include those for the four returning hunters from the previous Hunter: The Reckoning video game – the quick Martyr, the melee-focused Avenger, the magic-focused Judge, and the balanced Defender – and the newly added, strong Wayward, and the all-around powerful Risen. Players initially only have access to the Martyr, Avenger, Judge, and Defender; the two Wayward characters are made available by completing a certain area, and by playing through the entire game, respectively, and the Risen is made available by completing the game on its "nightmare" difficulty setting. Each character has a set of statistics, such as strength and speed, which slowly rise as players fight enemies. Characters that are not in use still gain experience, but less than the actively used characters.

Progression is non-linear: players have access to an open-ended hub area, from which they can choose which stages and missions to go to. Several of the areas are reused from the first game, but have new goals. Mission objectives vary, and include getting to the exit, finding and rescuing innocents, protecting a character from oncoming hordes of enemies, escorting characters, assembling silver weapons to fight werewolves, and defeating boss enemies.

== Plot ==
Wayward is set in the town of Ashcroft, in the World of Darkness – a gothic-punk interpretation of the real world, where monsters exist and hide in plain sight – and takes place two years after the events of the first Hunter: The Reckoning video game. Since the siege by darkness there in the previous game, the town has been rebuilt, and two hunters have arrived there. Before going on a hunt, one of them emails the hunters from the previous game – Deuce, Samantha, Father Cortez, and Kassandra – telling them that the battle is not over: an all-female cult led by a witch has entered Ashcroft, and with them large amounts of supernatural creatures that the hunters must return to quell. The four go to meet up with the Ashcroft hunters in a hotel, but the room is empty without signs of any struggle; searching the room, they find a map with marked locations, and use it to search for the hunters.

Eventually they find one of them, Joshua, being attacked by a werewolf from the cult in the graveyard; they defeat the werewolf, and take Joshua back to the hotel, where he tells the rest how he and his partner Devin had been captured by the cult and taken to the Ashcroft prison; Joshua was freed by the risen wraith Carpenter. The hunters steal a school bus and crash it through the prison gates to get inside, and set up a new base of operations in the security room. Aware of their arrival, the witch sends her cultists after them, but they manage to overpower her and save Devin while she escapes.

The hunters learn that the witch is planning to perform a ritual which requires the sacrifice of innocent life. Devin breaks off from the rest of the group, intending to kill everyone in Ashcroft to prevent the completion of the ritual. The other hunters strongly oppose this, and set off to save innocents, and eventually confront Devin, who has retreated on the hospital roof, from which he tries to shoot innocents. After they take down Devin, however, the witch uses Devin as her sacrifice, and a large tower materializes as the town starts to warp and beings from the Shadowlands appear. Atop the tower, the witch is used as an anchor for a Nephwrack – an ancient spirit from the Shadowlands – and is confronted by Carpenter, who opposes her, saying that Ashcroft is his town, and that she will be his when she is returned to the Shadowlands. The hunters climb the tower and fight the Nephwrack, destroying its material form and causing the tower to crumble. Back in safety, the hunters leave the town.

== Development ==
The game was developed by High Voltage Software.

Wayward was developed by High Voltage Software, based on White Wolf Publishing's tabletop role-playing game Hunter: The Reckoning, and was published by Vivendi Universal Games following former series publisher Interplay Entertainment's sale of the Hunter: The Reckoning video game rights in March 2003. It was produced by Chad Kent, designed by Warren Capps, and programmed by Anthony Glueck, with art by Joe Hamell. The game's score includes two songs by Forty Foot Echo, and five by No One. The developers relied heavily on visuals and audio in creating the horror, with dank and dark environments for the player to visit.

The game was announced in January 2003 as a PlayStation 2 version of the previous Hunter: The Reckoning video game, although with a new story, new gameplay features and an additional playable character. The core gameplay was tweaked based on issues players had had with the previous game. It was released for the PlayStation 2 on September 9, 2003, in North America, and on October 17 in Europe. A sequel, Hunter: The Reckoning – Redeemer, was released the following month for the Xbox.

== Reception ==
Reception

Aggregate score
Aggregator	Score
Metacritic	68/100

Review scores
Publication	Score
Game Informer	6.25/10
GamePro	3.5/5
GameSpot	7/10
GameSpy	4/5
GameZone	8.3/10
IGN	8.2/10

Wayward was met with "mixed or average reviews" according to the review aggregator Metacritic, but was considered a good introduction to the series and a worthy sequel. According to GameFan, the game performed moderately well commercially, which they in part attributed to the pre-existing fan base of the Hunter: The Reckoning tabletop game it is based on.

Critics appreciated the controls, and how they had improved compared to the previous game, although GameSpy and IGN thought they took time to get used to. The gameplay changes compared to the previous game, such as the non-linearity and diverse missions, were well received, but the combat and character progression were considered simplistic by GamePro and Game Informer. The game was also criticized for reusing areas, and how those were not designed with certain new mission objectives in mind. The multiplayer mode was commonly criticized for being limited to two players, compared to the previous game's four-player mode; it was still well received, however, and considered better than playing alone.

The visuals were criticized for being dull, blurry and dark, with worse textures and animations than the previous game. The framerate was also seen as a problem, with slowdown occurring in crowded scenes, although GameSpy found it mostly stable even in those circumstances. The art direction and character design was praised by IGN, reflecting the original tabletop game well. The audio design was well received, particularly combat and monster sounds, with GameZone considering the sound effects to be rivaling those in fellow horror game series Resident Evil. GameSpot and GameZone liked the voice acting, but the audio quality thereof was criticized by IGN as sounding muted.
