= Hunter: The Reckoning (video game) =

2002 hack-and-slash video game

- Cover art, featuring Father Cortez
- Developer: High Voltage Software
- Publisher: Interplay Entertainment
- Producers: Scot Lane; Kevin Sheller
- Designer: Dave Rodriguez
- Programmer: Dan Goodman
- Artist: Matt Corso
- Series: Hunter: The Reckoning
- Platforms: Xbox, GameCube
- Release: Xbox: NA: May 21, 2002; PAL: July 5, 2002; GameCube: NA: November 19, 2002; PAL: July 25, 2003
- Genres: Hack and slash, third-person shooter
- Modes: Single-player, multiplayer

Hunter: The Reckoning is a 2002 hack-and-slash third-person shooter video game developed by High Voltage Software and published by Interplay Entertainment for the Xbox and GameCube. It is based on the tabletop role-playing game of the same name, and is part of the larger World of Darkness series. Two sequels, Wayward and Redeemer, were both released in 2003.

Players take the roles of hunters who fight hordes of enemies with melee weapons, ranged weapons, and magic. The story revolves around Ashcroft Penitentiary, a prison which has been taken over by vampires as their feeding grounds; the inmates who die there rise again as vengeful and destructive wraiths.

Interplay chose to adapt Hunter: The Reckoning into a video game as they thought it would translate well into an action game, a genre their division Digital Mayhem was focusing on. It was intended from the start to be a flagship title for them, and the first in a series, which led to the decision to develop it for the Xbox, as it was new at the time and had greater graphical capabilities than other consoles. The game was well received for its gameplay and visuals, although the GameCube version was criticized for its downgraded graphics and frame rate issues.

== Gameplay ==
The characters have different strengths and weaknesses: Father Cortez, the Judge, can use powerful magic abilities.

Hunter: The Reckoning is a hack-and-slash third-person shooter game where players fight hordes of enemies in a single-player or multiplayer mode for up to four players. The players fight using ranged and melee weapons, but can also use magic spells called "edges", with effects such as dealing damage to a group of enemies, or healing oneself. Certain weapons can be earned as pick-ups through exploration, including a machine gun, a chainsaw, and a shotgun.

Players take the roles of four hunters, which have different character classes: Deuce is an Avenger, and the strongest; Samantha is a Defender, and is balanced between speed and power; Father Cortez is a Judge, and has weak melee skills but strong edges; and Kassandra is a Martyr, and is fast and has quick attacks. The characters also have a set of statistics, such as strength and accuracy, which can be raised throughout the game.

The game consists of 23 levels, set in locations including a graveyard, sewer system, prison, hospital, mansion, and a torture chamber. The levels vary in length, ranging from around five minutes to around half an hour, and have a variety of different objectives, including traversing the map, freeing hostages, escorting non-player characters, and searching for things. After finishing the game, players get access to a new difficulty level and alternate costumes for their characters.

== Plot ==
Hunter: The Reckoning is set in the prison town Ashcroft in the World of Darkness, a gothic-punk take on the real world where monsters exist and hide in plain sight. The prison, Ashcroft Penitentiary, has been taken over by vampires as their feeding grounds for the last 50 years, and the warden has been embraced by the vampires, turned into one himself. In addition to feeding on the inmates, the vampires are subjecting them to torture and experiments; the inmates that die end up rising again as vengeful wraiths who do not care who or what they destroy.

One year before the events of the game, four people are present at the execution by electric chair of the serial killer Nathaniel Arkady at Ashcroft Penitentiary: Spenser "Deuce" Wyatt, Samantha Alexander, Kassandra Cheyung, and Father Esteban Cortez. As the switch was thrown, the souls of the dead who suffered at the hands of the prison's warden and his supernatural staff rose up in vengeful rage, driven by evil to exact their vengeance upon the residents of Ashcroft. The four witnessed the uprising of the supernatural evil, and received a message in their minds from benign supernatural beings called messengers to act against the vast supernatural force that threatened the population of Ashcroft. Choosing to heed their calling, the four became Imbued, and destroyed the evil inside the prison. The four Imbued locked the prison, sealing what was left of the evil inside, and left Ashcroft.

On the anniversary of the closing and abandonment of Ashcroft Penitentiary, several hundred local teenagers hold a rave in the courtyard. The lively celebration awakens the dormant wraiths, who slaughter most of the teenagers, and, freed from their prison, rage out into the town and begin to destroy the population. The Imbued return to Ashcroft to confront the source of the evil that threatens the town and protect the remaining survivors.

A wraith appears to the hunters, named Carpenter, and tells them that warden Degenhardt is a vampire, and that Dr. Hadrian has been performing flesh-warping experiments on the inmates. Arkady, they find out, is a werewolf and still alive. After they kill Degenhardt and Hadrian, Carpenter attacks them for denying him his revenge on Hadrian. Degenhardt turns out to not be truly dead, and to have deliberately reawakened the haunting as part of his plan to find his living family's ghosts and give them new bodies. By confronting him in the attic of his mansion, the hunters release the tortured spirits, kill Degenhardt, and escape Ashcroft.

== Development ==
The game was developed by High Voltage Software.

Hunter: The Reckoning was developed by High Voltage Software in the AtlasTech game engine, and was published by Interplay Entertainment. The game was produced by Scot Lane and Kevin Sheller, designed by Dave Rodriguez, and programmed by Dan Goodman, with art by Matt Corso.

The concept of a World of Darkness video game adaptation came up during a brainstorm meeting at Interplay, whose staff included many fans of the series. When choosing which of the tabletop role-playing games in the series to adapt, Hunter: The Reckoning was picked over more established games like Vampire: The Masquerade, Werewolf: The Apocalypse, Mage: The Ascension or Changeling: The Dreaming due to Interplay's division Digital Mayhem's focus on action games, which they thought Hunter would translate well into. Production began around the beginning of 2001, and the game was announced in April of the same year. The choice to develop the game for the Xbox specifically came from how the console was new at the time, offering higher graphical capabilities compared to other available consoles. This was seen as important, as the game was intended from the beginning to be the first in a series, and be a flagship title for the publisher that gave a good impression.

Hunter: The Reckoning differed from most of High Voltage Software's games based on licensed properties, in that it was based on a game system rather than on characters in a specific setting with an established look. In adapting the tabletop game into a video game format, the developers focused on elements that would fit well in an action video game. They considered making the game appeal to younger audiences, but decided against it to avoid straying too far from the nature of the tabletop game. Certain characters were taken from the tabletop game, while the main cast was based on pre-made characters by High Voltage Software staff. The art direction was influenced by films, including Blade, The Crow, Blade Runner, and Dark City. The game's horror often relied on visuals and audio, with dark and dank environments; the developers also made use of the scare tactic of warping something that normally is seen as comforting into something scary, as seen in one part where a little girl's teddy bear transforms into a monster and kills her parents.

=== Release ===
The game was released for the Xbox in North America on May 21, 2002, following a delay from March 15, and in Europe on July 5. A GameCube port followed on November 19 of the same year in North America, and on July 25, 2003, in Europe; this port was tweaked to have lower difficulty, based on feedback from the original release. The Xbox version was added to the Xbox 360 system's backward compatibility functionality in November 2007, and to the Xbox One system's in April 2018.

In 2004, Uwe Boll acquired the movie rights for the game. The film was planned to be directed by Boll, produced by Shawn Williamson, and written by David Schneider and Drew Daywalt, with shooting planned to take place in British Columbia.

== Reception ==
Reception

Aggregate score
Aggregator	Score	
Aggregator	GameCube	Xbox
Metacritic	70/100	79/100

Review scores
Publication	Score	
Publication	GameCube	Xbox
AllGame	N/A	3/5
Eurogamer	N/A	8/10
Game Informer	N/A	8/10
GamePro	3.5/5	3.5/5
GameSpot	7.7/10	8/10
GameSpy	3/5	85%
IGN	6.8/10	8.7/10
Entertainment Weekly	N/A	B+

The original Xbox release of the game was well received by critics, while the GameCube version received "mixed or average" reviews, according to the review aggregator Metacritic. IGN called the game the "cream of the crop" of its genre, that future four-player games should be compared to, and in 2006 ranked it as the tenth best zombie video game. GameZone listed it as one of the top Xbox games that "need" an HD remake. According to GameFan, the game performed moderately well commercially, which they in part attributed to the pre-existing fan base of the Hunter: The Reckoning tabletop game it is based on.

The gameplay and combat were mostly well received by critics, particularly its multiplayer mode. The single-player mode was criticized by some reviewers as feeling lonely and repetitive; IGN considered only the multiplayer mode worth playing. AllGame did however find the combat sluggish and annoying, and thought the game seemed difficult in lieu of having intelligent enemy AI. The game's camera was frequently criticized, preventing players from seeing enemies in front of them, and making the multiplayer mode frustrating due to how it limits players' movement. (Note: See AllGame, GamePro, GameSpot, and GameSpy)

The Xbox version's visuals were frequently praised, with its environments described as atmospheric and detailed. (Note: See AllGame, Eurogamer, GamePro, GameSpot, GameSpy, and IGN) Likewise, reviewers enjoyed the look of the characters, their animations, and their designs. (Note: See AllGame, Eurogamer, GameSpy, and IGN) The GameCube version's visuals were however considered a major step down from the Xbox version, looking washed out and having frame rate problems in several areas, particularly in the multiplayer mode and when a lot of enemies are shown on screen at the same time. The sound effects were well received, but were also downgraded in the GameCube version. Reception of the voice acting was varied: it was called excellent by Entertainment Weekly, not very strong by AllGame, and "hideous" by GameSpy.
