= Conduit 2 =

2011 video game

- North American cover art
- Developer: High Voltage Software
- Publisher: Sega
- Producer: Kevin Sheller
- Designer: Eric Stoll
- Programmers: Dan Kaufman; John R. Sanderson
- Artists: Joe Hamell; Cary Penczek
- Writer: Jason L Blair
- Composer: Ed Dulian
- Series: The Conduit
- Engine: Quantum3
- Platform: Wii
- Release: NA: April 19, 2011; PAL: April 21, 2011
- Genre: First-person shooter
- Modes: Single-player, multiplayer

Conduit 2 is a first-person shooter video game developed by High Voltage Software for the Wii video game console. It is the sequel to The Conduit. The definite article of the original title was dropped during development as the developers considered it "too much of a mouthful".

The game makes use of the Quantum3 engine, a game engine designed by High Voltage Software specifically for the Wii. The engine allows effects such as bump mapping, reflection and refraction, and gloss and detail mapping to be implemented. Conduit 2 supports a wide variety of peripherals such as Wii MotionPlus, Classic Controller, Classic Controller Pro, and the PDP Headbanger Headset.

Conduit 2 released to mixed reviews, and failed to meet sales expectations. Despite the game ending on a cliffhanger, High Voltage Software has not developed a third Conduit game.

A Nintendo 3DS port was revealed prior to the game's release as a proof-of-concept but was seemingly abandoned.

== Gameplay ==
Conduit 2's single player mode has had many changes from the first game. Players now have the ability to flip over objects such as tables, bookshelves and soda machines to use as cover, and shoot off enemy armor and helmets to expose weak spots. A sprint button has been added to allow players to charge or flee from opponents. Players can ride on vehicles in certain levels and fire weapons from them. At the beginning of levels, players can choose their weapon loadouts, and customize their character's appearance and ability upgrades. The use of iron sights has been implemented, and grenades explode on a timer. Levels are less "corridor-based" in design, with multiple paths to explore. The game's story unfolds during gameplay through triggered scripted sequences instead of through cutscenes as in the first game. Enemy AI has been enhanced; to make them appear more lifelike, enemies have conversations between themselves when they're unaware of the players presence. The enemies can flip and knock over things like tables and filing cabinets for makeshift cover, and enemies blind fire when players aim at them while they're behind cover. The enemies possess randomized weapons. The enemy AI behavior also changes depending on which weapon they have. For example, a foe with a shotgun will attempt to run up to the player to shoot him at close range, while a foe with a rifle will hang back and shoot from afar. Enemy behavior also varies depending on which weapon the player is armed with. For example, enemies try to search for players who have cloaked with the ARC Eclipse rifle. Enemies dive out of the way of fragmentation grenades and attempt to suicide bomb the player when stuck with a radiation grenade. Enemies feature randomly selected armour pieces and helmets so that each enemy looks different. Conduit 2 features 23 enemy types, as opposed to the first game which only had 14. While Conduit 2 retains the customizable controls from the first game, the game supports Wii MotionPlus for enhanced precision control and better tracking, though it is not required to play the game. In addition, Conduit 2 supports the use of the Classic Controller and Classic Controller Pro.

High Voltage stated that they intended to concentrate more on art and story – both areas which were criticized in The Conduit. Conduit 2 takes place in many locations throughout the world. The game is set in Atlantis in addition to Washington, D.C., Agartha, Siberia, the Amazon, England and China. Conduit 2 features 16 campaign missions at an estimated 6-8 hour length, as opposed to The Conduit's 9 missions at 4–6 hours. The game also features boss battles against large aliens, and 21 weapons, with additions such as the "Aegis Device" (known as the vortex cannon prior to the Electronic Entertainment Expo 2010) which catches rounds fired by opponents and then fires the collection of ammunition back at them, or a mobile turret that can be picked up and moved to different parts of a level, and remotely fired from behind cover, as well as the Phase Rifle; which is capable of firing through walls. Some weapons are customizable. Most weapons have a secondary fire mode. Likewise, some weapons from the first game have been retooled to fire differently. Various weapons and devices have returned from the first game with some being improved upon, such as the All-Seeing-Eye or ASE, used to scan objects for use in a wide range of circumstances, such as data logs, force fields, and to discover hidden traps and unlockables. While in the first game, the ASE emitted a sound in order to indicate nearby scannable objects, Conduit 2 features a manual sonar like "ping" system which helps indicate to players where scannable objects are hidden.

=== Multiplayer ===
Along with a standard single-player and multiplayer online modes, the title features four-player split-screen multiplayer with offline and online modes. The online element features "increased security" over the first game to prevent hackers. Nevertheless, hackers still managed to create a bunch of hacks such as "Infinite Health" working on public matches. Bounty Hunter mode returned from the first game, as well as a new Co-op mode which features "Invasion Mode", in which players combat waves of enemies on the same console in split-screen mode. The game allows up to 12 players to battle online, and was one of the first Wii games to support the PDP Headbanger Headset, which allows voice chat between players without the need for exchanging friend codes. In addition to the Wii's use of Friend Codes, the game features a "Rival System" in which a player can send rival requests to other players in the lobby to add to their rivals list. Up to 96 friends can be listed.

Conduit 2 supports patching to allow fixes to bugs and glitches in its online multiplayer. Another feature added is the ability for players to revive fallen teammates. The game introduces different character classes, each with unique attributes, and allow the player to alter their characters appearance as well as unlock over 30 suit upgrades that bestow special skills, such as robotic legs that let the player to sprint greater distances. Players are able to switch between four different character classes during the course of a match, each with different player-defined weapons and upgrades. The multiplayer features 12 maps, 14 game modes and 60 player rankings, whereas The Conduit only featured 7 maps, 9 game modes and 25 player rankings. Conduit 2 also features a female NPC skin for multiplayer, which was absent in the first game. Conduit 2 features a currency system that allows players to earn experience points and medals that can be used to purchase weapons, upgrades and armor pieces to alter their characters look. A new voting system has been implemented into the multiplayer which allows players to choose between two online maps and game types when the player enters the lobby for a specific mode. There is also a playlist featuring no radar and no lock-on.

== Plot ==
=== Backstory ===
The backstory for the game is told primarily through scan-able conspiracy objects scattered throughout the game. Conduit 2's backstory relies heavily on Sumerian mythology and the Reptilian Conspiracy, a conspiracy theory that the Annunaki, a group of Sumerian deities, were actually extraterrestrials who used humans as slaves and entertainment. The progenitors fill this role in Conduit 2, serving as a basis for the Annunaki deities and having since scattered themselves across the world, secretly controlling and influencing the governments and people of their respective areas. References are also made to Tiamat and the Deluge myth.

In addition, Conduit 2 incorporates other conspiracies such as the Dropa stones, Tunguska event, and the disappearance of Col. Percy Fawcett.

=== Synopsis ===
Starting immediately after the events of the first game, Michael Ford follows John Adams through a conduit and ends up on the GLOMAR oil rig, a Trust platform. He realizes that, though he destroyed the Trust's base in Washington, D.C., he did not destroy the Trust. The oil platform is in the western corner of the Bermuda Triangle, off the coast of Florida, and is being attacked by a giant tentacular sea serpent called the Leviathan. Before stranding Ford on the oil platform, Adams makes Ford the offer to join him, which Ford promptly refuses. The Leviathan is defeated by Ford, but in a final act of defiance, "eats" Ford only to regurgitate him into Atlantis, an alien spacecraft that was used by Adams, Prometheus, and their siblings to arrive on Earth.

There, Prometheus gives Ford the black exoskeleton suit of the Destroyer before they proceed to awaken a human woman, Andromeda, from hundreds of years of stasis. Andromeda reveals to Ford that, as he bears the Destroyer exoskeleton, he is the aptly titled Destroyer whose purpose is to destroy the Pathfinder, John Adams. Andromeda uses the ship's conduit to take Ford to a Cold War-era bunker in D.C. outside of the Smithsonian. Here he finds the Drudge fighting each other, with one group led by a Drudge drone named Thex calling themselves the Free Drudge and one group serving the Trust. The Free Drudge call Ford "the Liberator" for destroying their link to the Trust and liberating them.

Ford uses artifacts in the museum to find the locations of two progenitors who could assist Ford in his battle against Adams. Upon returning to Atlantis, Ford finds the ship unstable and has to fight giant stone golems to stop the ship. After doing so, he learns that Adams has been killing other progenitors and stealing their power in order to increase his own. Using the co-ordinates gained at the Smithsonian, Ford arrives to China to warn a progenitor named Li. However, Li refuses to listen to Ford and believes him to be an assassin. Michael is forced to kill Li, upon which Prometheus takes Li's energy into the ASE.

Using the second set of co-ordinates, Ford arrives in Siberia, where he finds the Free Drudge (led by Thex) attacking the Trust. The Free Drudge assist Ford into getting to Katarina, a female progenitor, who the Trust hold captive, waiting to give her to Adams. In order to ensure that Michael can defeat Adams, Katarina sacrifices her energy to the ASE. Andromeda radios coordinates to Ford leading him to the Lost City of Z in Central America, where Thex takes him in his dropship. Upon arrival, they find a female progenitor dead. Prometheus takes her energy into the ASE as well before revealing his true plan: to donate the energy of all the progenitors into Michael so that he can kill Adams, though this means that Prometheus will have to die as well.

After Michael gets the energy of all the progenitors, he proceeds back to Atlantis via a conduit, but the ship is attacked by Adams and the Trust. Andromeda programs the ship to teleport to the center of the Earth, Agartha, where Ford destroys Adam's human form. Michael manages to overcome and destroy Adam's alien form and absorbs the latter's energy into himself as well. Sensing that all the progenitors on Earth are destroyed, the ASE sends a signal out to the Oort Cloud in which Tiamat, a dormant alien spacecraft of limitless knowledge, rests. Tiamat awakens and heads to Earth as the conduit in Agartha opens and several men in destroyer armor, including George Washington and Abraham Lincoln, arrive. They tell Ford that they have come to help him in the upcoming battle.

== Development ==
Development of Conduit 2 began after The Conduit shipped in June 2009. The game was announced on March 29, 2010, after months of speculation of a sequel's existence. During the production of the first game, development resources were spread thin as both the gameplay and the game's engine were designed simultaneously. For Conduit 2, the developers were able to devote their resources fully to game design, as the engine had already been made. As they did during the development of the first game, High Voltage Software asked for feedback from fans for what features they wanted to see in the game. Features such as split-screen, sniper rifles and female characters were put in at fans requests. Sean Ratcliffe, Vice President of Marketing, SEGA of America said: "The Conduit 2 is an enormous sequel. Not only does it greatly improve and expand on the original, the online and co-op play modes aim to raise the bar for Wii war games."

The game runs at 48 kHz audio. On July 29, 2010, Sega revealed Conduit 2's box art. In September 2010, it was reported that the game would be delayed until Q1 2011 and supports Classic Controller input. In an attempt to improve Conduit 2's story over the first game, High Voltage Software hired novelist Matt Forbeck and Jason Blair, the writer of the video games Borderlands and Prey, to pen the game's script. In an interview with Keith Hladik, it was stated that all voice actors from the first game would not be returning but the new voice actors have done "a fantastic job making our characters come to life." Agent Michael Ford is now voiced by voice actor Jon St. John, who is best known for providing the voice for Duke Nukem. Conduit 2 was originally compatible with the Wii Speak peripheral as The Conduit was, but functionality of the device was removed from the title at the insistence of Nintendo. Wii Speak support was dropped as it was incompatible with the PDP Headbanger headset, which support was opted for instead for its lower latency and better sound quality. Motion controls were originally planned to be used for opening doors and flicking switches, but this feature was eventually removed from the game. A few of the game's levels, such as an oil rig and the streets of downtown Washington DC, were based on environments that were scrapped from the first game.

On January 18, 2011, Sega announced Conduit 2 would be delayed until March in North America. A few days later, they announced it would be pushed back to April 2011 in North America.

At the 2011 Game Developers Conference (GDC), High Voltage Software revealed a tech demo of Conduit 2 for the Nintendo 3DS. The demo, based on the China level from Conduit 2, demonstrated stereographic 3D effects, as well as the ability to shift into a third-person perspective.

=== Marketing ===
Sega and High Voltage Software ran a competition Nintendo created that offered entrants the chance to have a picture of their face on a wanted poster in Conduit 2. Entrees were asked to write a 25-word letter detailing what they would like to see featured in Conduit 2.

== Reception ==
=== Pre-release previews ===
From the E3 playable preview, Conduit 2 was met with positive expectations from reviewers, praising the many improvements from the first game such as those in the multiplayer mode.

=== Post-release ===
Reception

Aggregate scores
Aggregator	Score
GameRankings	66.34%
Metacritic	64

Review scores
Publication	Score
Game Informer	6 out of 10
GameSpot	7 out of 10
GameTrailers	7.9 out of 10
GameZone	7 out of 10
IGN	7.5 out of 10
Joystiq	1 out of 5
Nintendo Power	7.5 out of 10
Official Nintendo Magazine	84%

Conduit 2 has received mixed responses from critics, with a score of 64 on Metacritic. Nintendo Power gave Conduit 2 a 7.5/10, stating that it still had some flaws but praising the effort in addressing criticism about the first game. Official Nintendo Magazine UK gave it 84% criticising the "B-Movie" plot but praising the visuals and level design.

IGN gave Conduit 2 a 7.5/10, praising the "truly excellent" art direction, which "will take you from the stunning caverns of China to snowy Siberian hills" and the pacing, for which "the designers deserve an immense amount of credit." The "big, epic" boss fights were noted as a high point, while the "lack of variety" in standard enemy design made the single-player "feel generic at times." The review concluded that the game was "worth playing for the visuals alone" and "the fact that gameplay and control operate as well as they do speaks volumes" about the talent of the developers. However, the game was criticized for doing little to distinguish itself from the original, and for lacking "creativity and diversity." GameSpot gave the title a 7/10, stating: "Conduit 2 overcomes its problems by offering a long and varied single-player campaign with a good sense of humor." The "spectacularly inept" AI and the multiplayer were subject to criticism. GameZone gave the game a 7 out of 10, stating: "There's enough trigger-happy joy here to keep you busy long after the campaign ends, guaranteeing valuable longevity. Hopefully, a bolder design philosophy will allow future iterations to break new ground rather than settle for "good enough" in meeting player expectations." Joystiq gave Conduit 2 a rating of 1 out of 5 stars.
