= Gyrostarr =

2008 video game

- Wiiware photo of Gyrostarr
- Developer: High Voltage Software
- Publisher: High Voltage Software
- Producer: Kevin Sheller
- Designer: Patrick Dolan
- Programmer: John R. Sanderson
- Artists: Damion J. J. Davis; Lisa Wells
- Platform: Wii (WiiWare)
- Release: NA: June 23, 2008
- Genre: Shoot 'em up
- Modes: Single-player, multiplayer

Gyrostarr is a shoot 'em up video game developed and published by High Voltage Software. It was released only as WiiWare through the Wii Shop Channel. It was released in North America on June 23, 2008.

== Gameplay ==
Gyrostarr is described as a sci-fi shooter with 3D graphics procedurally generated by High Voltage Software's Quantum3 game engine, allowing the game's 50 levels of space track to be stored within the 40 megabyte size limit imposed by Nintendo.

Gameplay in Gyrostarr

Several control schemes are available. Players can choose between motion controls using the Wii Remote, buttons and analog joysticks using the Nunchuk, or the Classic Controller. A "paired" control system allows two players to use a connected Wii Remote and Nunchuk or Classic Controller at the same time, with one player using the Wii Remote and the other using the attachment.

Up to four players control spaceships as they travel through "a twisting, turning techno-plasma canal in space," the goal being to collect enough energy "to penetrate an alien portal and warp to the next conduit." Not collecting enough energy, which fills a meter at the top of the screen, will result in the player's ship being destroyed at the end of a level. If the player completely fills the energy meter, however, then at the end of the level the player will be transported to a bonus level where no enemies are present and the only objective is to collect as much energy as possible. Players can also collect points in the game to try to beat the high score by destroying enemies and collecting energy. Points multiply and accumulate when the player avoids enemy fire in addition to shooting down enemy spacecraft.

A variety of weapons and power-ups can be found throughout the game. Defensive power-ups have a wide range of effects, such as providing temporary invincibility or slowing down enemies. Player ships also come equipped with a grapple gun, which allows the player to pick up distant power-ups more quickly. Unique for a scrolling shooter game, all power-ups can be targeted, shot, and bounced off the sides of a level, making them more difficult to acquire for other players.

=== Multiplayer ===
Gyrostarr supports up to four players for multiplayer gameplay. Multiplayer can be cooperative or competitive, depending on the actions of the players. This allows players to either work together to complete a level or hamper each other's performance. Player ship positions are staggered across the track of a level; collecting a power-up moves a player to the last position, while collecting energy will eventually move a player to the front.

== Reception ==
Reception

Aggregate scores
Aggregator	Score
GameRankings	71% (Based on 7 reviews)
Metacritic	69/100 (Based on 11 reviews)

Review scores
Publication	Score
IGN	7.2/10
Nintendo World Report	8/10

Gyrostarr received mixed reviews upon its release. IGN gave Gyrostarr an average rating, saying that the graphics were better than many other WiiWare games and praising the co-op experience as being fun. Negative aspects of the game were identified as a lack of challenge in the levels and that the game's sense of speed was severely lacking, with levels starting out slowly and only speeding up near the very end. Overall, Gyrostarr was called "a pretty fun experience, though one that we think could use a sequel to really focus, refine, and capitalize on."

Nintendo World Report gave the game a slightly higher score, citing the gameplay as "simple and addictive," and noting a strong similarity between Gyrostarr and the arcade shooter Tempest, but also criticized the lack of online leaderboards. The review concluded that "fans of arcade-style twitch shooters should get plenty of entertainment out of the game, and it's reasonably priced."
