= Inanimae: The Secret Way =

Role-playing game supplement

- Publisher: White Wolf Publishing
- Publication date: 1998

Inanimae: The Secret Way is a 1998 role-playing game supplement published by White Wolf Publishing for Changeling: The Dreaming.

== Contents ==
Inanimae: The Secret Way is a supplement about a kind of changeling that takes other forms rather than living among humans.

== Reviews ==
- SF Site
- Backstab #12
- Casus Belli #116
