= The Technomancer's Toybox =

Role-playing game supplement

- Publisher: White Wolf Publishing
- Publication date: 1998

The Technomancer's Toybox is a 1998 role-playing game adventure published by White Wolf Publishing for Mage: The Ascension.

== Contents ==
The Technomancer's Toybox is a supplement about techno-magical devices.

== Reviews ==
- InQuest Gamer #36
- Backstab #9 (May-Jun 1998) p. 55
- Dragon #245 (Mar 1998) p. 104
- D20 #3 p. 14-16
