= Zathura (video game) =

2005 video game

- Developer: High Voltage Software
- Publisher: 2K
- Composer: Jason Graves
- Platforms: PlayStation 2, Xbox
- Release: NA: November 3, 2005; EU: January 27, 2006; AU: 2006 (PS2)
- Genres: Action-adventure game, platformer
- Mode: Single-player

Zathura is an action-adventure game developed by High Voltage Software and published by 2K for the PlayStation 2 and Xbox in 2005. The game is based on the 2005 film Zathura: A Space Adventure, which, in turn, is an adaptation of the 2002 children's book Zathura by Chris Van Allsburg. The game was released on November 3, 2005, in North America, coinciding with the then-upcoming film's release on November 11. A Game Boy Advance version was planned, but was later canceled.

== Gameplay ==
Zathura is a third-person action-adventure game. You play as brothers Danny and Walter as they navigate through space-themed levels, battling enemies and solving puzzles to complete the Zathura board game and get back home.

The game combines platforming and combat elements. You can switch between Danny and Walter, each with their own abilities. Walter is bigger and can move heavy objects; Danny is smaller and can fit in tight spaces. Zathura is designed for younger players, featuring simple controls and easy difficulty. However, some platforming sections and camera issues can be challenging. You can complete the game in 2–3 hours.

== Reception ==
Reception

Aggregate score
Aggregator	Score	
Aggregator	PS2	Xbox
Metacritic	43/100	48/100

Review scores
Publication	Score	
Publication	PS2	Xbox
4Players	17%	17%
GameSpot	5.6/10	5.7/10
IGN	3.4/10	3.4/10
Jeuxvideo.com	7/20	N/A
PlayStation Official Magazine – UK	3/10	N/A
Official Xbox Magazine (UK)	N/A	3/10
PSM3	26%	N/A
TeamXbox	N/A	6.7/10
VideoGamer.com	3/10	3/10

The game received "unfavorable" reviews on both platforms according to the review aggregation website Metacritic.
