= Jumanji (disambiguation) =

Jumanji is an American media franchise.

Jumanji may also refer to:

== Jumanji media ==
- Jumanji (picture book), 1981 fantasy children's picture book
- Jumanji (film), 1995 American fantasy film
- Jumanji (TV series), an American animated television series based on the film
- Jumanji: Welcome to the Jungle, a 2017 sequel to the original film
  - Jumanji: Welcome to the Jungle (soundtrack), the film's soundtrack
- Jumanji: The Next Level, a 2019 sequel to Jumanji: Welcome to the Jungle
- Jumanji: Open World, a 2026 sequel to Jumanji: The Next Level

== Songs ==
- "Jumanji" (song), a 2012 rap song by Azealia Banks
- "Jumanji", a 2018 rap song by B Young
- "Jumanji", a song by Destroy Lonely from Broken Hearts 3

== See also ==
- Zathura (disambiguation)
- Jumanji 2 (disambiguation)
