= The Conduit =

- Developers: High Voltage Software; War Drum Studios (The Conduit HD)
- Publishers: Wii: Sega; Android: High Voltage Software
- Designers: Rob Nicholls; Eric Nofsinger
- Composers: Diego Stocco; Rick Nielsen
- Series: The Conduit
- Engine: Quantum3
- Platforms: Wii, Android
- Release: Wii: NA: June 23, 2009; EU: July 10, 2009; AU: July 16, 2009; Android: WW: March 14, 2013
- Genre: First-person shooter
- Modes: Single-player, multiplayer

The Conduit is a first-person shooter video game developed by High Voltage Software for the Wii console and Android. The Conduit was revealed on April 17, 2008, and on October 29, 2008, the developer announced that Sega had signed on to be the game's publisher. The game was released in North America on June 23, 2009, in Europe on July 10, 2009, and in Australia on July 16, 2009.

Development of The Conduit began in October 2007. The game makes use of the Quantum3 engine, a game engine designed by High Voltage Software specifically for the Wii. The engine allows effects such as bump mapping, reflection and refraction, and gloss and detail mapping to be implemented in the game. High Voltage Software's goal in creating the engine was to make The Conduit a competitive experience visually comparable to games on the PlayStation 3 and Xbox 360.

The campaign storyline focuses on an alien invasion of Washington, D.C. in the near future. The alien race, known as the Drudge, uses the eponymous portal-like Conduits to deploy their forces throughout the city. A shadow government organization called the Trust sends newly inducted agent Michael Ford into the area initially to disrupt a terrorist threat, but he quickly becomes embroiled in the fight to stop the invasion and save the capital from destruction. The online multiplayer feature of the game can support up to 12 players and includes several game modes such as "Free for All" and "Team Reaper", and has voice chat capability through the Wii Speak peripheral.

A sequel, Conduit 2, was announced on March 29, 2010, and released in April 2011. A high definition port titled The Conduit HD for Android was released, initially for devices with Nvidia Tegra chipsets, on March 14, 2013. The port went on to receive critical acclaim.

== Gameplay ==
The shooting controls of The Conduit were inspired by Metroid Prime 3: Corruption and Medal of Honor: Heroes 2, first-person games which had well-received Wii control schemes. The Conduit offers user customizable control features, such as the ability to alter the size of the bounding box, the speed at which the player can move the camera, and cursor sensitivity. Furthermore, the player can adjust these options in real time, without having to leave the adjustment screen to try the changes. The developer also included the option for the player to change the control layout, so that any gameplay function can be mapped to any button or motion on the Wii Remote. Other customizable aspects include the player's maximum running speed and the layout of the game's HUD; the elements of the HUD can be moved to different locations around the screen or removed.

The Conduit provides an experience typical of a first-person shooter, focusing on combat in a 3D environment and taking place from the first-person perspective of a playable character. A unique feature of the game is a device known as the "All-Seeing Eye", or ASE, which is recovered by the player early on and used to solve various puzzles. The ASE can detect hidden traps and enemies scattered throughout a level, and reveal secret features in the environment that can help the player to progress, such as uncovering invisible doors and platforms and other interactive objects.

=== Campaign ===
The single-player campaign mode of The Conduit consists of nine missions. The story is told primarily through cutscenes between missions, but television and radio broadcasts are also scattered across a mission area for the player to seek out. These broadcasts are not necessary to fully understand the story, but provide background information that supplements the overall plot. In addition, as the player explores the game more subtle clues in the environment, such as a precisely placed object in a certain historical location, can be discovered which are meant to provoke questions about elements of the story. The intention of this was to reward players who want to explore and understand more of the story, while not taking away from the experience for other players who only want to complete the game.

Agent Ford uses the All-Seeing Eye to uncloak a Drudge Scarab.

The main enemies of The Conduit are an insect-like alien race called the Drudge. Their forces are divided into five main types: Mites, Drones, Skimmers, Scarabs, and Invaders. Mites are the smallest forms, some of which can fly and others explode when in close proximity to the player. Drones are adult-form Drudge that serve as common soldiers, and Skimmers are an alternate adult-form that can fly. Scarabs are much more powerful than Drones, equipped with heavily armored exoskeletons and powerful weaponry. The most dangerous enemies are Invaders, giant quadrupedal insectoids that serve as bosses. Other enemies in the campaign include Drudge-controlled United States military personnel and Trust agents.

The Drudge also incorporate various devices to defeat or hinder the player. Among these is the Drudge portal, or Conduit, which can be placed throughout a level to allow Drudge enemies to spawn from them until they are destroyed by the player. Other Drudge devices, such as Drudge-healing Regenerator Units and radiation-producing Pulse Boxes also appear in the game. The game's Quantum3 engine provides the Drudge with advanced artificial intelligence that allows them to adopt unusual strategies in combat. Such strategies include recognizing when the player is open to attack and then charging the player, or running away and seeking cover when outmatched. There are five difficulty levels to choose from, based on the five levels of the then-active color-coded Homeland Security Advisory System, and the difficulty can be adjusted at any time during a mission.

=== Multiplayer ===
Similar to the Wii version of Medal of Honor: Heroes 2, multiplayer in The Conduit is online-only, with 13 different gameplay variations, seven different maps and 15 weapons to choose from. Multiplayer modes include standard deathmatch and team-based modes. In "Free for All" category modes, each player is independent and can attack any other player to score. In the "Marathon" mode, players must score as many kills as possible within a time limit. Other "Free for All" modes include "Three Strikes", which limits players to only three lives per match; "ASE Football", where the player who captures and holds the All-Seeing Eye device the longest wins; and "Bounty Hunter", which involves each player hunting a specific opposing player and receiving penalties if the wrong player is targeted. Team-based modes, under the "Team Reaper" category, focus on cooperation between players to achieve a specified goal. "Marathon" can be played with teams in "Team Reaper", and a "shared-stock" option can be activated which forces the players in each team to draw from one limited pool of lives. "Team Objective" is a capture the flag-like mode where each team must find and capture an ASE more times than the opposing team to win.

The online multiplayer supports up to 12 players simultaneously, although a player capacity of 16 was originally planned. When seeking an online match, the player can choose playlists with randomly selected players from locally or around the world, or with players who have exchanged friend codes. Maps for the multiplayer are taken from places seen in the campaign, but are redesigned to better suit the different multiplayer modes. Voice chat for the online multiplayer is included through implementation of the Wii Speak peripheral, and is available only between players who have exchanged friend codes and are on the same team. The Conduit was the first third-party Wii game to use the accessory. While in a Free for All match, players are only able to hear the six other players closest to them on a level. The developer stated that the decision was made in order to cut down on the substantial amount of noise created by 12 players speaking at once.

== Synopsis ==
=== Setting ===
The Conduit takes place in the near future, as Washington, D.C. is shaken by several unusual and tragic incidents. A mysterious flu-like disease known as "the Bug" has swept across the region through local water sources, resulting in high-security locations being left understaffed as government workers are afflicted. Months after the initial outbreak, an alleged terrorist attack destroys part of the Washington Monument, and on September 11, a senator is assassinated by another terrorist cell reportedly disguised as members of her staff, greatly heightening local and national tensions. Most alarmingly, an assassination attempt on the President of the United States occurs only weeks after the previous attacks, carried out by the president's own Secret Service detail. In the midst of these events, Agent Michael Ford must overcome the onslaught of the alien Drudge and the humans under the Drudge's control, and defeat the masterminds behind the invasion.

=== Characters ===
The Conduit's protagonist is Agent Michael Ford (voiced by Mark Sheppard), a Secret Service agent who is inducted into the Trust after saving U.S. President Charles Thompson during an assassination attempt. John Adams (voiced by W. Morgan Sheppard) is the enigmatic commander of the Trust who sends Agent Ford into Washington, D.C. to combat a rising terrorist threat and recover stolen Trust technology; he is later set up as the game's central antagonist. Prometheus (voiced by Kevin Sorbo) is introduced as the terrorist leader, but becomes the sole supporting character and assists Ford's efforts against the Drudge.

=== Plot ===
Agent Michael Ford regains consciousness in a collapsed Washington Metro tunnel, some time after the invasion of the alien Drudge. Fighting his way through utility corridors, Ford comes upon a massive Conduit embedded in the atrium of a Metro station. After defeating the aliens' defense, Ford enters the Conduit.

The story then flashes back to five days earlier, before the invasion, as Ford is contacted by John Adams, leader of the mysterious Trust organization. He informs Ford of an upcoming operation to recover a Trust prototype stolen by the terrorist Prometheus. The Trust has set up an ambush at Reagan National Airport to capture Prometheus as he flees, and Ford is assigned to ensure that if the ambush fails, Prometheus will be apprehended at any cost. During the operation, the Trust agents turn against Ford and he is forced to battle his way through the airport to the Metro train that Prometheus is supposed to be using. As Ford reaches the forward train car with no sign of Prometheus, a wounded scientist tries to destroy the train. Ford survives the explosion and regains the prototype All-Seeing Eye. Alarmed at Prometheus' ability to turn his own agents against him, Adams orders Ford to infiltrate Prometheus' base at Bunker 13, a defunct Cold War-era facility, and hack into his lines of communication. After Ford destroys a cache of mind-altering chemicals, Adams betrays him, saying he will tell the President that Ford died fighting the first wave of the Drudge invasion. Ford is then contacted by Prometheus, who offers him a way out. Emerging from the bunker near the now combat-damaged Jefferson Memorial, Ford eliminates a Drudge force and is airlifted to safety by Prometheus' helicopter.

Ford is dropped at the Library of Congress and told to demolish the Drudge nests hidden in the sewers below before the city is overwhelmed. Prometheus reveals that he was a former member of the Trust who became disillusioned and defected with the All-Seeing Eye. He explains that Adams had been manipulating Ford, and had made him destroy the Trust-developed neuro-toxins in Bunker 13 to cover the organization's tracks. At this point, Ford assumes Adams and The Trust are cooperating with the Drudge in order to take control of the country. Desperate to upset Adams' plan, Ford storms the White House in an attempt to save President Thompson. During the rescue the President is led to believe that Ford is a Trust agent; thinking that the Trust can avert the crisis, Thompson signs over executive power to Adams before escaping on the Marine One.

Prometheus then prompts Ford to investigate and defend the Pentagon and secure its national defense codes. After he eliminates the Drudge forces there, Prometheus deduces that a much larger infestation is in downtown Washington D.C. The search for its source leads Ford down into the subways, where he finds and enters the large Conduit depicted at the start of the game. It transports him to the Trust's headquarters, where he learns that the existing Drudge are being created and deployed into the city by Trust-maintained Conduits. After fighting through the base, with Adams taunting Ford and jamming Prometheus' communications signal, Ford reaches a chamber holding a single captive alien being who reveals himself as Prometheus. Prometheus explains that he was used as the genetic blueprint to clone Adams' army of Drudge, who at this point are revealed to be creatures created on the Earth and are not aliens, and persuades Ford to kill him to prevent Adams' work from continuing. Ford, after hesitation, complies and proceeds to clear out the rest of the base, when Adams disables the base's Conduit networks and activates its self-destruct sequence to trap Ford. Prometheus then speaks to Ford from the ASE, where he uploaded his consciousness before his death, and instructs Ford on how to reactivate the Conduit network in the base. After fighting his way through the last of the Drudge, Ford enters a Conduit to escape the self-destructing Trust headquarters, determined to find and kill Adams. This leads immediately into the events of Conduit 2.

During the credits, Adams can be heard speaking to an unknown alien contact, where he reveals himself to be Enlil, an alien exile who has been on Earth for 240 years. Adams/Enlil reports that Prometheus is dead, and that the plan to take control of Earth is still in effect.

== Development ==
The Conduit was announced to be in production on April 17, 2008, through IGN. The developer began considering creating a new game for the Wii that would cater to the "hardcore" audience. The game was designed to have a comparable experience to games on the PlayStation 3 and Xbox 360 despite the hardware limitations of the Wii. The game's announcement was seen as something of a surprise because the company had largely been known for its licensed titles which had been marketed mainly to younger audiences. By the developer's own admission, many of these licensed games have received mediocre reviews in the gaming press. Eric Nofsinger, the development team's Chief Creative Officer (CCO), claimed that the company saw potential in the Wii early on, but noted that much of what has succeeded on the Wii so far has been family-oriented or Nintendo-promoted games. Nofsinger went on to say, "The other titles that have come out in that vein have been a bit lackluster. The games that have done well are the casual games so publishers see those as viable. We're trying to do something that really hasn't been done to its full extent to my knowledge." In October 2008 the developer confirmed that the game was at a pre-alpha state and the majority of development was being shifted to the multiplayer mode, and by March 2009 the game had reached the "post-beta" stage, with most work involving debugging and play-testing. In early June 2009, the developer announced that The Conduit had gone gold.

The Wii MotionPlus attachment, revealed by Nintendo during Electronic Entertainment Expo 2008, was originally intended to be compatible with The Conduit, but the developer later decided against incorporating it due to unresolvable technical issues and the lack of features in the game that could take advantage of the accessory. Eric Nofsinger stated about the Wii MotionPlus that "We were really excited, going back and forth with Nintendo on how to integrate [Wii MotionPlus] and what the best use for it was. But when we actually implemented it, it really didn't bring that much to the table... But maybe for a future version we'll revisit [Wii MotionPlus], and if we can build something around it that makes sense." The accessory would later on be compatible with the sequel.

=== Storyline ===
The storyline for The Conduit was handled by High Voltage Software's staff, with unspecified assistance from author Matt Forbeck, and designed to focus on an underlying theme of conspiracy that would "propel the storyline and the Conduit universe". The location of Washington, D.C. was chosen as the game's setting for its iconic historical background and association with national and international politics, while the acts of terrorism that precede the main storyline were intended to provide a framework that would foreshadow the concept of betrayal for political gain throughout the game. Other elements of the game, such as secret underground passages spread throughout the city that are implied to have been built by the Trust, and the Trust organization itself, were also designed to evoke a sense of conspiracy. Various symbols, such as those relating to Freemasonry and the Illuminati, are spread throughout the game to further the conspiracy idea. The developer drew inspiration for the story from the books The Sirius Mystery by Robert Temple and Chariots of the Gods by Erich von Däniken, as well as the films Cloverfield and They Live, among other works.

=== Graphics ===
The player aims at a group of hostile soldiers. Quantum3 provides lighting, mapping, and depth-of-field effects for the scene.

The game is notable for the strong focus on the game's visuals by High Voltage Software, using a Wii-specific engine called Quantum3. Upgrading the game engine, which had previously been used by the developer in several other titles, began in October 2007. This engine "allows the developer to create graphic effects normally seen on other consoles with vertex and pixel shaders." These effects include bump-mapping, reflection and refraction, light and shadow maps and projections, specular and Fresnel effects, missive and iridescent materials, advanced alpha blends, gloss and detail mapping, motion blur, interactive water with complex surface effects, and animated textures, among other things. The Quantum3 engine also includes advanced artificial intelligence, allowing for enemies in the game to possess "human-like behavior". According to Eric Nofsinger, "Our [High Voltage Software]'s goal is to be the most technically innovative Wii developer on the planet."

High Voltage Software set a goal for a steady 30 frames per second frame rate with no flicker for the game. The development team had previously claimed that it had a goal of 60 frames per second, but in the end it was decided that development time would be better spent on the game's other features and that it ran smoothly enough at 30 frames. Red Eye Studios, a subsidiary of the developer, supplied motion captured animation for The Conduit.

During E3 2008, the developer debuted a playable demo of the game which consisted of the first half of a level included in the actual game and showed several of the Drudge enemies, as well as several different human and alien weapons. Environmental effects showcased in the demo included reflections in glass objects such as windows and the scope of the player's weapon, water effects, and textures. Following E3, High Voltage Software updated the Quantum3 engine with several new features, including a depth of field effect, heat distortion, and specularity. The developer also claimed it was working to increase the number of predefined death animations that occur when the player kills an enemy, so that each different enemy type would die differently depending on the weapon used against it. Also featured is a "color curve" system in which the screen colors desaturate progressively as the player takes damage, with the colors completely desaturating into black and white upon the player character's death.

=== Audio ===
Composer Diego Stocco was chosen by Audio/Video Director Michael Metz to provide the musical score for The Conduit, with guitarist Rick Nielsen also being hired after expressing an interest in the game. Metz explained how Stocco was brought into the project, saying "From the hundreds of CDs that come across my desk, there was one that had recently stuck out to me. It was called Epic Textures from a company called Epic Score... With a little digging I found out that the man behind those awesome ambient tracks was mostly Diego Stocco... I gave Diego a call and he was very excited to help us out with the project." In creating the musical score, Stocco built several unique instruments as needed, such as a "DistroDrum", an acoustic drum combined with a toy piano, and a "Metal Contrabass", which consisted of piano and bass strings attached to a garage heater.

For each level of the game, a different soundtrack with three different parts was created; these parts were "ambient", "mid-tempo", and "upbeat". After creating the tracks, the main instrumental sounds of each one was combined with others to produce more tracks. Sound Designer Ed Dulian would create music that suited each level and event in the game's campaign, and fellow Sound Designer Mark Muraski worked to implement the music in the game itself. Rick Nielsen would supply guitar riffs that were overlaid upon the main soundtracks. The game features an adaptive music system where music in the game will change when the player enters combat or completes an objective.

While working on the game's voice acting, several placeholder recordings were used for each character until Lead Designer Rob Nichols contacted W. Morgan Sheppard, Mark Sheppard, and Kevin Sorbo to voice the lead roles. To provide voice for the alien language of the Drudge, two local actors were hired, Tom Taylorson and William Dick. Located throughout the game's levels are radios and televisions which include different stations, each of which was voiced by a different actor. High Voltage Software obtained permission to use recordings from the Wilco album Yankee Hotel Foxtrot taken from the Conet Project on these different stations. The game also supports Dolby Pro Logic II surround sound.

=== Publisher ===
High Voltage Software began the development of The Conduit without a publisher. Soon after the game received a high amount of publicity, at least ten companies expressed interest in publishing the game. The developer claimed that one of the reasons why many of its licensed games have generated poor reviews is because big publishers interfered with the game design process, and said that it wanted to do as much as it could with the game before getting a publisher. On October 2, 2008, during Nintendo's fall media summit, the developer's CCO Eric Nofsinger stated that although High Voltage Software had selected a publisher and had originally intended to reveal its choice during the conference, further legal matters had to be finalized and the publisher would not be officially announced until sometime later that month. According to Nofsinger, the developer regards the game as the first in a potential franchise, and the chosen publisher was also open to the idea of creating a sequel to The Conduit. Nofsinger continued, "I think people are going to feel like they got their money's worth [with The Conduit], but we've got a big ol' universe of stories that we want to tell."

The publisher was finally revealed to be Sega on October 29, 2008. Kerry Ganofsky, CEO and founder of High Voltage Software, stated "Sega shares our vision for the title and its tremendous potential, which is why we chose them from a long list of potential partners. With their support, we are confident that The Conduit will deliver the definitive shooter experience that Wii fans have been waiting for." The announcement came the day after Sega added a file folder for The Conduit to its File Transfer Protocol website, which sparked rumors that the publisher might have been chosen to support High Voltage Software's game.

== Marketing ==
=== Promotions ===
High Voltage Software launched a contest for user-created control configurations for The Conduit on September 18, 2008. One control scheme would be selected from the submissions and added to the game as a preset configuration, and the name of the configuration's creator would be noted in the credits. The contest ended with three winners being chosen; the results were announced by Lead Designer Rob Nicholls in a video overview of the game released on January 15, 2009.

In May 2009, a video mashup contest for The Conduit sponsored by the creator of the software program ACIDPlanet and in association with the game's developer was announced. Participants are asked to create and submit a video of in-game footage from The Conduit using the available video clips and game audio tracks on the ACIDPlanet website. Winners received assorted merchandise from Sony Creative Software, Sega, and High Voltage Software, and the winning audio mixes were included as a bonus track with the game's official soundtrack. The soundtrack however, was never officially released.

=== Retail editions ===
The Conduit was sold in two separate versions: the Standard Edition and the Special Limited Edition. The Standard Edition includes only the game disc and instructional manual with no extra features. The Special Limited Edition includes the game disc, the manual, a 24-page art book featuring concept art made at different stages of the game's development and an alternative Special Edition case cover art. On the last page of the Art Book are two cheat codes to unlock a special ASE for single player mode and a Special Agent skin for online player. There is a third code that is not listed that lets the character play as a Drone. However, since the game disc and manual is the same in both releases, the codes are not unique, and thus purchasing the Special Limited Edition is not necessary to unlock the bonus in-game content.

=== Comic ===
To promote the release of the game, Sega released a tie in comic book titled The Conduit: Orange Lights, written by Pat Dolan. The comic was made available as a free PDF file through amazon.com. Set three weeks after the events of the game's single-player campaign, Orange Lights chronicles the efforts of conspiracy radio host Gordon Welles to disseminate incomplete, raw footage of Michael Ford's actions, captured by news reporter Heather Hampton, to the public.

== Reception ==
Reception

Aggregate scores
Aggregator	Score
GameRankings	72.23% (64 reviews)
Metacritic	69% (79 reviews)

Review scores
Publication	Score
1Up.com	C+
Edge	4/10
Eurogamer	5/10
Game Informer	7/10; Second Opinion: 7.5
GameSpot	6.5/10
GamesRadar+	8/10
GameTrailers	7.8/10
IGN	8.6/10
Nintendo Power	8.0/10
Official Nintendo Magazine	76%
X-Play	3/5

Awards
Publication	Award
	IGN: Best Shooter Game of E3 2008 (Wii), Best Graphics Technology of E3 2008 (Wii), Best Wii Game of E3 2008
	GameTrailers: Best Wii Game of E3 2008

The Conduit has received mixed to positive reviews. The game has an aggregate average of 72.23% at GameRankings based on 64 reviews, and a metascore of 69% at Metacritic based on 79 reviews. In general, the game's praise is mostly centered on its technical success, online play, and intuitive controls, while its criticism is centered on the storyline and single-player experience.

Nintendo Power praised the game as proof that first-person shooters work well with the Wii console, and further complimented the customization allowed by the control system, calling the experience "seamless". Points of criticism were that the story was simple and predictable, environments lacked the destructible elements of many other contemporary games, and that the All-Seeing Eye device featured in the game was underused. The online multiplayer mode was favorably compared to that of the Halo video game franchise, and was noted as "impressively smooth". Other critics also noted that the game was similar to Halo. The reviewer concluded by stating "[High Voltage Software] can at least lay claim to the best pure first-person shooter on Wii." Official Nintendo Magazine criticized some campaign levels as repetitive and "a chore", and asserted that "the Drudge aliens are aptly named." The multiplayer mode was called a welcome addition to the Wii's online shooter lineup, however, and the reviewer noted that the plot was "a lot of fun" due in part to cut scenes that helped tie events in the game together. Overall, the reviewer believed that the game lacked inspiration, but was still an enjoyable shooter video game.

IGN lauded the game's customizable control scheme, considering it to be "the tightest, most comfortable control scheme of any console-based first-person shooter to date" as well as the "engrossing" plot that "throws you for a loop now and again...[and is] all made more immersive by way of excellent voice acting." The reviewer noted that the game was "very much a straightforward, linear FPS focused on simple run-and-gun gameplay" but that "the gunplay in High Voltage's project is no less intense or enjoyable" as a result. Criticism included that "you will find yourself fighting the same small selection of enemies throughout the adventure" and that "it's not revolutionary". The multiplayer mode was complimented, but the reviewer claimed that some online matches would lag, making some games "unplayable". GamesRadar stated the game was "fun, controls well, and is, at times, quite beautiful... yes, for a Wii game." The voice work for the campaign mode was praised as "stellar", but the reviewer described the overall storyline as "a shell of rather vanilla conspiratorial intrigue." Multiplayer was noted as being "a cut above" other Wii online games, and the reviewer summarized by saying "The solid, yet unremarkable single-player won't win any awards, but The Conduit still features the most finely honed online outings available on Wii." GameSpot praised the game as an "undeniable success" from a technical standpoint, calling the controls "outstanding" and the graphics "top-notch". The game's other features met with criticism, however, with the reviewer calling the single-player levels generic and monotonous and the multiplayer "unremarkable". The game's main fault, according to the reviewer, was that it was too generic, with the technical successes overshadowed by "wasted potential".

Game Informer felt that the game's multiplayer elements were strong for a Wii game in the genre, but the single player mode seemed to be "little more than a thinly disguised sequence of arenas whose doors magically unlock after you've cleared the area of hostilities". They also praised its weaponry, calling it "inventive", and the graphics, but noted that the controls, particularly the aiming, felt shaky, and that the Wii remote itself was the biggest problem getting in the way of smooth control, with the placement of the "secondary buttons" being "poor".

Classic Game Room gave a positive review. They declared that The Conduit was an enjoyable first-person shooter on a platform nearly void of them. They also praised the online multiplayer, claiming "...it works like it should".

Ben 'Yahtzee' Croshaw of Zero Punctuation gave a very negative review of the game. Yahtzee criticized the aiming system of the game, saying: "The Conduit's gameplay is marred by the limitations of the Wii controller... Pointing at the screen to shoot is the standard Wii FPS model, but the only way to turn is to aim to the side, and since the Wiimote only works when it's pointed directly at the screen, you stop turning if you aim too far." Yahtzee also criticized the plot, describing it as "barely fucking there and at the same time virtually impenetrable", and the graphics as being not anywhere close to Xbox 360 or PlayStation 3 graphics as the game was advertised, and concluded by saying "I would sooner recommend nailing your tongue to a subway train."

Upon being ported to the Android OS, The Conduit HD was received far better than the original Wii version.

=== Awards ===
The Conduit won several awards following its appearance and demonstration at E3 2008. IGN gave it three awards: Best Shooter Game of E3 2008 (Wii), Best Graphics Technology of E3 2008 (Wii), and Best Overall Wii Game of E3 2008. GameTrailers also gave the game Best Wii Game of E3 2008. The game won the worst box art award from GameSpot. "It's like the artists who created the box art had a checklist of bad sci-fi cliches from the nineties, and went through the list checking off as many as they could." IGN nominated it for both the "Best Shooter 09" (Wii) award and the "Best Multiplayer 09" (Wii), but lost to Dead Space: Extraction and New Super Mario Bros. Wii, respectively.

=== Sales and sequel ===
The Conduit debuted during the market research company NPD Group's June reporting period, which lasted from May 31, 2009, to July 4, 2009. From its initial release in North America on June 23, 2009, until the end of the June reporting period, The Conduit sold 72,000 units domestically. Sega announced in their Q1 2009 financial report that they had shipped 150,000 units in North America and Europe in the game's first week. In February 2010, High Voltage Software CEO Kerry Ganofsky told IGN that The Conduit had sold over 350,000 copies. A sequel, Conduit 2 was announced on March 29, 2010.
