= Also Sprach Zarathustra (painting) =

1995–1997 oil paintings by Lena Hades

Also sprach Zarathustra (Thus Spoke Zarathustra or Thus Spake Zarathustra) is the oil painting cycle by Lena Hades painted from 1995 to 1997 and inspired by Friedrich Nietzsche's philosophical novel of the same name. The painter created her first painting in December 1995 in Moscow. The Thus Spake Zarathustra cycle is a series of twenty-eight oil paintings made by the artist from 1995 to 1997 and thirty graphic works made in 2009. Twenty-four of the paintings depict so-called round-headed little men and their struggles in life. The remaining four depict Zarathustra himself, his eagle and serpent. Six paintings of the series were purchased by the Moscow Museum of Modern Art and by private collectors. The oil painting Also Sprach Zarathustra series was exhibited several times — including the exhibition at the Institute of Philosophy of the Russian Academy of Sciences in 1997 and at the First Moscow Biennale of contemporary art in 2005.

In 2004, a bilingual edition of Nietzsche's book Also sprach Zarathustra was published in Russian and German by the Institute of Philosophy of the Russian Academy of Sciences. The edition includes 20 Hades paintings from this cycle and the art critical essays written by three art historians Alexander Yakimovich, Olga Yushkowa and Jean-Christophe Ammann, professor at the Goethe University Frankfurt in Frankfurt and the director of the Museum of Modern Art in 1991–2001.

== Paintings ==
All paintings of the cycle the artist herself calls visual metaphors to the book and not illustrations.

In Lena Hades' interview with Nietzsche.ru portal, she told about the prehistory of the cycle:

HADES.
To be very brief, in my case, there was the birth of painting from the spirit of the text. An artist was born inside me only due to Nietzsche. Without Nietzsche I would never have decided to become a professional artist, to abandon from all other "callings" in favor of painting. It was a difficult decision, because the artist is easy to die from starvation. Very easy. Prior to Nietzsche I naively believed in many things that I had been imposed on by the surrounding society. I believed, for example, in culture, science, friendship, love, and church. A lot of things were unshakeable for me, and I lived with the ideas about them established without me. But when I first read Zarathustra - this text insulted me in all my best beliefs and convictions. It didn’t leave even the slightest hint of these my naive notions, it denied everything. Everything turned out not so, as I thought. And since it hurt me so, I began to read it more carefully. And gradually I realized that in general it was right that the world is not what it seems to us, not what our parents and social environment tries to teach us, or in other words, social suggestion of the world does not match the reality of the world. And most importantly - the real world has values completely different from the "conventional" values of any taken separately culture. All this led to the inner upheaval and change in attitude. I saw the world with different eyes. With Nietzsche’s eyes! And then his eyes for some reason just became my eyes. Apparently, there is a certain spiritual affinity between us, which allows me now to breathe easy his texts.

INT.
Your works, especially large ones, are dominated by these expressive saturated reds and yellows, creating an atmosphere of condensed semi-insanity, inhuman, demonic tension. Therefore, your paintings crush with their power and heavy energy. Heavy pressing power. You have it anywhere. Is that the feeling you have due to Nietzsche’s texts?

HADES.
For me, this is what the nakedness of life is, or more precisely, its halkion element. And somehow none of the Nietzsche experts have ever paid any attention to this halkion perception of Nietzsche. And yet, in ECCE HOMO Nietzsche calls himself a halkioner. I think that Nietzsche borrowed the word "halkioner" from Ancient Greek, which he knew brilliantly. In ancient Greek "halkeyo" means "to be a blacksmith, to forge." A halkion element is a kind of a forging element, not just chthonic, underground, but forging, where metal melts and is forged. This is a kind of an inner smithy, where the character is forged, and human will and strength are forged.

== Painting perception ==
Jean-Christophe Ammann called the painting of the series tablets. "Figurative language of Lena Hades expresses itself often intentionally as a poster, because we see here some visual tablets which should stir and awaken. At the same time, the language of her images remains faithful to the fundamental task of the artist: every artist should be a dervish, not only in order to conjure the collective memory, being in constant motion, but also to stay in the thought and memory of our times. Lena Hades is a dervish."

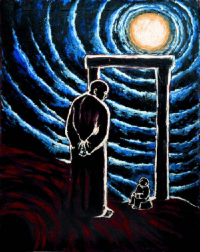
Zarathustra and dwarf, 1997

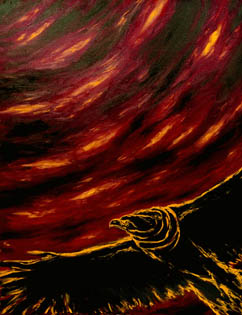
Eagle and snake, 1997.

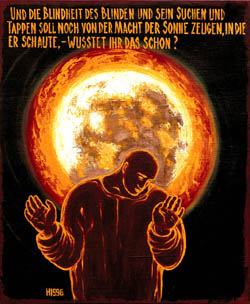
And the blindness of the blind one, and his seeking and groping... 1996.

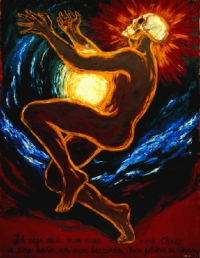
1997.

== Publications ==
- 미래를 창조하는 나 – 차라투스트라는 이렇게 말했다 (고전읽기 [I'm making the future] (in Korean). Seoul: Mirae N Culture Group. 2009. ISBN 978-89-378-4498-0.

== Sources ==
- Nietzsche, Friedrich (2004). Also sprach Zarathustra. Institut of Philosophy of Russian Academy of Sciences. p. 384. ISBN 5-9540-0019-0.
