= High Voltage Software =

American video game development company

High Voltage Software, Inc.
- Type: Subsidiary
- Industry: Video games
- Founded: April 1993; 33 years ago
- Founder: Kerry J. Ganofsky
- Headquarters: Hoffman Estates, Illinois, US
- Key people: Anthony Glueck(Studio Head)
- Products: Lego Racers; The Conduit; Saints Row: Gat out of Hell
- Number of employees: 160 (2006)
- Parent: Keywords Studios (2020–present)
- Website: high-voltage.com

High Voltage Software, Inc. (HVS) is an American video game developer based in Hoffman Estates, Illinois. Founded in April 1993 by Kerry J. Ganofsky, the company is best known for developing Lego Racers (1999), Hunter: The Reckoning (2002) and The Conduit (2009).

== History ==
High Voltage Software was founded by Kerry J. Ganofsky in April 1993, following his graduation from college. Out of Hoffman Estates, Illinois, a suburb of Chicago, the company started out with four employees and used old doors set on top of sawhorses as desks. In June 2006, the company had 160 employees.

In 2008 interviews, High Voltage leadership expressed interest in improving the quality of contemporary third-party Wii games. The company developed Quantum3, a game engine that specifically targets Wii deployment. The engine itself had been used in several previous titles made by the developer, but was heavily upgraded for higher performance on Wii.

In December 2014, Ganofsky announced that High Voltage would be opening a satellite studio for the company in Place St. Charles in New Orleans. The opening, scheduled for early 2015, would provide 80 new job opportunities in the area, with initial staff transferred from the company's Hoffman Estates headquarters. Through the opening, High Voltage was able to take advantage of local financial incentives, including a US$150,000 performance-based grant to cover relocation costs, workforce training programs and a digital media incentive. Prior to the announcement, Ganofsky also considered opening the studio in Georgia or Florida, but found New Orleans to be a better cultural fit for High Voltage. As a result, talks between economic development leaders in the area and Ganofsky began in October 2013.

On December 15, 2020, High Voltage Software was acquired by Keywords Studios for an initial consideration of US$23.75 million in cash and $9.75 million in shares, as well as additional US$16.5 million for performance targets to be met by December 31, 2021.

== Unreleased projects ==
=== The Grinder ===
In the late 2000s, High Voltage began developing a horror-themed shooter called The Grinder. The game initially began production exclusively for the Wii, the developers, as well as potential publishers for The Grinder, became less confident that the game would be a success on that system, as there were multiple instances of similar hardcore and/or graphically violent games designed for the Wii, such as MadWorld, House of the Dead: Overkill and Red Steel 2 that failed to sell many copies. Development for the Wii version eventually began to wind down quietly by 2010, although High Voltage Software refused to state whether that version was officially cancelled. The developers also designed PlayStation 3, Xbox 360 and PC versions of the game, which were initially going to play as first-person shooters like the Wii version, but plans for this ultimately fell through when it failed to appeal to candidate publishers and the developers realized that there was an ongoing oversatuation of the first-person shooter video game market. After careful consideration, they decided to not only redesign the PS3, Xbox 360 and PC versions as a top-down shooter, but also change the game's setting, plot and character designs to a substantial degree.

In 2013, High Voltage Software, in an interview, implied that one significant reason why it was difficult to release The Grinder was because it was being developed during a time when the video game industry was more interested in well-established intellectual properties, rather than newly introduced ones like that of The Grinder. The company then expressed hope that they can be in better position to launch new intellectual properties like The Grinder when a new generation of video games began. However, having lost substantial money and jobs from the troubled development of The Grinder, as well as poor sales of Conduit 2, the company decided not to revisit The Grinder.

== Games developed ==
Year	Title	Platform(s)	Publisher(s)
1995	White Men Can't Jump	Atari Jaguar	Atari Corporation
1995	Ruiner Pinball	Atari Jaguar	Atari Corporation
1995	Star Trek: Starfleet Academy – Starship Bridge Simulator	Sega 32X	Interplay Entertainment
1995	Vid Grid	Atari Jaguar CD	Atari Corporation
1996	NHL Open Ice	Microsoft Windows	Midway Games
1996	NBA Jam: Tournament Edition	Atari Jaguar	Midway Games
1996	Fight For Life	Atari Jaguar	Atari Corporation
1996	NBA Hangtime	Microsoft Windows	Midway Games
1996	Tempest 2000	Classic Mac OS, Sega Saturn	Interplay Entertainment
1996	Tempest X3	PlayStation	Interplay Entertainment
1997	World League Basketball	Microsoft Windows, PlayStation	Mindscape
1997	NCAA Basketball: Final Four 97	Microsoft Windows, PlayStation	Mindscape
1999	Paperboy	Nintendo 64	Midway Games
1999	Lego Racers	Microsoft Windows, Nintendo 64, PlayStation	Lego Media
1999	NBA Inside Drive 2000	Microsoft Windows	Microsoft
2000	Ground Control: Dark Conspiracy	Microsoft Windows	Sierra Studios
2000	All-Star Baseball 2001	Nintendo 64	Acclaim Entertainment
2000	NFL Quarterback Club 2001	Dreamcast, Nintendo 64	Acclaim Entertainment
2002	Baldur's Gate: Dark Alliance	GameCube	Interplay Entertainment
2002	Monster Jam: Maximum Destruction	Microsoft Windows	Ubi Soft
2002	NBA Inside Drive 2002	Xbox	Microsoft
2002	Disney's Stitch: Experiment 626	PlayStation 2	Disney Interactive
2002	NBA Inside Drive 2003	Xbox	Microsoft Game Studios
2002	Hunter: The Reckoning	GameCube, Xbox	Interplay Entertainment
2003	Hunter: The Reckoning – Wayward	PlayStation 2	Vivendi Universal Games
2003	Hunter: The Reckoning – Redeemer	Xbox	Vivendi Universal Games
2003	NBA Inside Drive 2004	Xbox	Microsoft Game Studios
2003	Disney's The Haunted Mansion	GameCube, PlayStation 2, Xbox	TDK Mediactive
2004	Duel Masters	PlayStation 2	Atari
2004	Leisure Suit Larry: Magna Cum Laude	Microsoft Windows, PlayStation 2, Xbox	Sierra Entertainment
2005	Zathura	PlayStation 2, Xbox	2K Games
2005	Charlie and the Chocolate Factory	GameCube, PlayStation 2, Xbox	Global Star Software
2005	50 Cent: Bulletproof G Unit Edition	PlayStation Portable	Vivendi Games
2005	Call of Duty 2: Big Red One	GameCube	Activision
2005	Codename: Kids Next Door – Operation: V.I.D.E.O.G.A.M.E.	GameCube, PlayStation 2, Xbox	Global Star Software
2006	The Grim Adventures of Billy & Mandy	PlayStation 2, GameCube, Wii	Midway Games
2006	Blitz: Overtime	PlayStation Portable	Midway Games
2006	Family Guy Video Game!	PlayStation 2, PlayStation Portable, Xbox	2K Games, Fox Interactive
2007	Harvey Birdman: Attorney at Law	PlayStation 2, PlayStation Portable, Wii	Capcom
2007	Ben 10: Protector of Earth	PlayStation 2, PlayStation Portable, Wii	D3 Publisher
2007	Tom Clancy's Ghost Recon Advanced Warfighter 2	PlayStation Portable	Ubisoft
2007	America's Army: True Soldiers	Xbox 360	Ubisoft
2008	Go, Diego, Go!: Safari Rescue	PlayStation 2, Wii	2K Play
2008	V.I.P. Casino: Blackjack	Wii	High Voltage Software
2008	Gyrostarr	Wii	High Voltage Software
2008	Dora the Explorer: Dora Saves the Snow Princess	PlayStation 2, Wii	2K Play
2008	Go, Diego, Go!: Great Dinosaur Rescue	PlayStation 2, Wii	2K Play
2009	The Secret Saturdays: Beasts of the 5th Sun	PlayStation 2, PlayStation Portable, Wii	D3 Publisher
2009	High Voltage Hot Rod Show	Wii	High Voltage Software
2009	Astro Boy: The Video Game	PlayStation 2, PlayStation Portable, Wii	D3 Publisher
2009	Ni Hao, Kai-Lan: Super Game Day	PlayStation 2, Wii	2K Play
2009	Dora the Explorer: Dora Saves the Crystal Kingdom	PlayStation 2, Wii	2K Play
2009	Evasive Space	Wii	Akinai Games
2009	The Conduit	Wii	Sega
2010	Iron Man 2	Wii, PlayStation Portable	Sega
2010	Tournament of Legends	Wii	Sega
2010	Dora's Big Birthday Adventure	PlayStation 2, Wii	2K Play
2010	Pheasants Forever Wingshooter	Wii	GameMill Entertainment
2010	Rudolph the Red-Nosed Reindeer	Wii, Nintendo DS	Red Wagon Games
2011	Conduit 2	Wii	Sega
2011	Captain America: Super Soldier	Wii, Nintendo 3DS	Sega
2011	Nicktoons MLB	Wii, Xbox 360	2K Play
2011	Nickelodeon Fit	Wii	2K Play
2011	Nickelodeon Dance	Wii, Xbox 360	2K Play
2011	Victorious: Time to Shine	Xbox 360	D3 Publisher
2011	Country Dance	Wii	GameMill Entertainment
2011	Country Dance 2	Wii	GameMill Entertainment
2012	Country Dance All-Stars	Xbox 360	GameMill Entertainment
2012	Kinect Star Wars	Xbox 360	LucasArts, Microsoft Studios
2012	Zone of the Enders HD Collection	PlayStation 3, Xbox 360	Konami
2012	Toy Story Mania!	PlayStation 3, Xbox 360	Disney Interactive Studios
2012	Nickelodeon Dance 2	Wii, Xbox 360	2K Play
2012	Avengers Initiative	Android, iOS	Disney Interactive
2012	Batman: Arkham City Lockdown	Android, iOS	Warner Bros. Interactive Entertainment
2012	Victorious: Taking the Lead	Wii	D3 Publisher
2013	Le Vamp	iOS	High Voltage Software
2013	Zoombies: Animales de la Muerte	iOS	High Voltage Software
2013	The Conduit HD	Android	High Voltage Software
2013	Mortal Kombat	Microsoft Windows	Warner Bros. Interactive Entertainment
2013	Enter the Dominatrix	PlayStation 4, Xbox One	Deep Silver
2013	Injustice: Gods Among Us	PlayStation 4, Microsoft Windows	Warner Bros. Interactive Entertainment
2013	Ben 10: Omniverse 2	PlayStation 3, Xbox 360, Wii, Wii U	D3 Publisher
2014	The Amazing Spider-Man 2	Nintendo 3DS	Activision
2015	Saints Row IV: Re-Elected	PlayStation 4, Xbox One	Deep Silver
2015	Saints Row: Gat out of Hell	PlayStation 4, Xbox One	Deep Silver
2015	Mortal Kombat X	Microsoft Windows	Warner Bros. Interactive Entertainment
2016	Damaged Core	Microsoft Windows	Oculus Studios
2016	Dragon Front	Microsoft Windows	Oculus Studios
2017	They Live to Destroy	Microsoft Windows	Oculus Studios
2018	Mutant Year Zero: Road to Eden	Microsoft Windows, Nintendo Switch, PlayStation 4, Xbox One	Funcom
2018	Fortnite: Save the World	Microsoft Windows, PlayStation 4, Xbox One	Epic Games
2019	Zombieland: Double Tap – Road Trip	Microsoft Windows, Nintendo Switch, PlayStation 4, Xbox One	GameMill Entertainment, Maximum Games
2019	Ballista	Oculus Quest, Oculus Rift	Oculus Studios
2025	Dragon Front: Adventures	Microsoft Windows	High Voltage Software

=== Canceled ===
- Thea Realm Fighters (Jaguar)
- Kid Vid Grid (Jaguar)
- Country Vid Grid (Jaguar)
- The Grinder (Wii, PlayStation 3, Xbox 360, Microsoft Windows)
- Paperboy (PlayStation)
