= List of WiiWare games =

This is a list of original downloadable games on the Wii video game console that could only be downloaded from the WiiWare section of the Wii Shop Channel. Translations of Japanese exclusive titles are highlighted between parenthesis.

All WiiWare titles could be transferred to and/or purchased via Wii Mode on the Wii U console. The last officially released WiiWare title was the Crunchyroll app on October 15, 2015.

Nintendo discontinued the Wii Shop Channel on January 30, 2019, nearly a year after the purchase of Wii Points ended on March 26, 2018.

== Released games ==
There are 429 games included in the list.

Title and source	Developer(s)/Publisher(s)	JP	NA	PAL
"Aha! I Found It!" Hidden Object Game; Aa! Mitsuketa! Item Sagashi Game^{JP}	Ateam Inc.	Yes	Yes	Yes
"Aha! I Got It!" Escape Game; 1 Nuke! Dasshutsu Game: My Home Hen^{JP}	Ateam Inc.	Yes	Yes	Yes
101-in-1 Explosive Megamix	Nordcurrent	No	Yes	Yes
2 Fast 4 Gnomz	QubicGames	No	Yes	Yes
3-2-1, Rattle Battle! Atsui 12 Game: Furi Furi Party!^{JP}	Tecmo	Yes	Yes	Yes
3D Pixel Racing	Microforum Ltd.	No	Yes	Yes
3°C	Kemco	Yes	No	No
5 Arcade Gems	Nordcurrent	No	Yes	Yes
5 Spots Party	Cosmonaut Games	No	Yes	Yes
5-in-1 Solitaire	Digital Leisure	No	Yes	No
81diver (Hachi Wan Diver) Wii	Silver Star Japan	Yes	No	No
A Monsteca Corral: Monsters vs. Robots	Onteca	No	Yes	Yes
Adventure Island: The Beginning; Takahashi Meijin no Bōken Jima Wii^{JP}	Hudson Soft	Yes	Yes	Yes
Adventure on Lost Island: Hidden Object Game; Item Sagashi: Yōsei to Fushigi no Shima^{JP}	Ateam Inc.	Yes	Yes	Yes
Aero Guitar	Yudo	Yes	No	No
Airport Mania: First Flight	Reflexive Entertainment, Lemon Games	No	Yes	Yes
Alien Crush Returns	Hudson Soft, Tamsoft	Yes	Yes	Yes
And Yet It Moves	Broken Rules	No	Yes	Yes
ANIMA: Ark of Sinners	Anima Game Studio	No	Yes	Yes
Ant Nation	Konami	No	Yes	Yes
AquaSpace^{NA} Zenquaria: Virtual Aquarium^{PAL} Aqua Living: Terebi de Nagameru Sakanatachi^{JP}	Nintendo, Paon	Yes	Yes	Yes
Arcade Essentials	Nordcurrent	No	Yes	Yes
Arcade Sports; Arcade Sports: Air Hockey, Bowling, Pool, Snooker^{PAL}	Icon Games	No	Yes	Yes
Arkanoid Plus!	Taito	Yes	Yes	Yes
Around the World	Wizarbox	No	Yes	Yes
Art of Balance	Shin'en Multimedia	No	Yes	Yes
Art Style: CUBELLO; Art Style Series: CUBELEO^{JP}	Nintendo, skip Ltd.	Yes	Yes	Yes
Art Style: light trax Art Style Series: Lightstream^{JP}	Nintendo, skip Ltd.	Yes	Yes	Yes
Art Style: ORBIENT; Art Style Series: ORBITAL^{JP}	Nintendo, skip Ltd.	Yes	Yes	Yes
Art Style: ROTOHEX; Art Style Series: DIALHEX^{JP}	Nintendo, skip Ltd.	Yes	Yes	Yes
Art Style: ROTOZOA^{NA} Art Style: PENTA TENTACLES^{PAL} Art Style Series: PENTA TENTACLES^{JP}	Nintendo, skip Ltd.	Yes	Yes	Yes
Astro Bugz Revenge	Sudden Games	No	Yes	No
Aya and the Cubes of Light	Object Vision Software	No	Yes	Yes
Babel Rising	Lexis Numérique	No	No	Yes
Back to Nature	UFA Lab	No	No	Yes
Bakutan (Bomb Tapper)	Alpha Unit	Yes	No	No
Balloon Pop Festival	UFO Interactive Games	No	Yes	No
Bang Attack	Engine Software	No	Yes	Yes
Battle Poker	Left Field Productions	No	Yes	No
Bejeweled 2	PopCap Games	No	Yes	Yes
Ben 10 Alien Force: The Rise of Hex	Konami	No	Yes	Yes
Big Bass Arcade	Big John Games	No	Yes	No
Big Kahuna Party	Reflexive Entertainment	No	Yes	No
Big Town Shoot Out	Performance Design Products	No	Yes	Yes
Bingo Party Deluxe; Wai Wai Bingo Deluxe^{JP}	Ateam Inc.	Yes	Yes	Yes
Bit Boy!! Bit Man!!^{JP}	Bplus, Marvelous Entertainment	Yes	Yes	Yes
bittos+	Unconditional Studios	No	Yes	No
Blaster Master: Overdrive	Sunsoft	No	Yes	Yes
Block Breaker Deluxe	Gameloft	Yes	Yes	Yes
Blood Beach	Coresoft Inc.	No	Yes	Yes
Bloons	Hands-On Mobile	No	Yes	Yes
Bobby Carrot Forever	FDG Entertainment	No	Yes	Yes
Boingz	RealNetworks, NinjaBee	No	Yes	No
Boku wa Plarail Untenshi: Shinkansen & Jōkikikansha Hen	Takara Tomy	Yes	No	No
Bokumo Sekai wo Sukuitai	Poisoft	Yes	No	No
Bokumo Sekai wo Sukuitai: Battle Tournament	Poisoft	Yes	No	No
Bomberman Blast; Wi-Fi 8 Hito Battle Bomberman^{JP}	Hudson Soft	Yes	Yes	Yes
Bonsai Barber	Zoonami, Nintendo	Yes	Yes	Yes
Brain Challenge (available from 2008-10-14 to 2011-06-28 in Japan)	Gameloft	Yes	Yes	Yes
Brain Drain	Enjoy Gaming	No	Yes	Yes
Bruiser and Scratch	Steel Penny Games	No	Yes	No
Bubble Bobble Plus! Bubble Bobble Wii^{JP}	Taito	Yes	Yes	Yes
BurgerTime World Tour	MonkeyPaw Games	No	Yes	Yes
Burn the Rope	Big Blue Bubble	No	Yes	No
Bust-a-Move Plus!^{NA} Puzzle Bobble Plus!^{PAL} Puzzle Bobble Wii^{JP}	Taito	Yes	Yes	Yes
Carmen Sandiego Adventures in Math: The Big Ben Burglary	Gamelion, The Learning Company	No	Yes	No
Carmen Sandiego Adventures in Math: The Case of the Crumbling Cathedral	Gamelion, The Learning Company	No	Yes	No
Carmen Sandiego Adventures in Math: The Great Gateway Grab	Gamelion, The Learning Company	No	Yes	No
Carmen Sandiego Adventures in Math: The Island of Diamonds	Gamelion, The Learning Company	No	Yes	No
Carmen Sandiego Adventures in Math: The Lady Liberty Larceny	Gamelion, The Learning Company	No	Yes	No
Carnival King	Incredible Technologies, n-Space	No	Yes	No
Castlevania: The Adventure ReBirth; Dracula Densetsu ReBirth^{JP}	Konami, M2	Yes	Yes	Yes
Cave Story	Studio Pixel, Nicalis	No	Yes	Yes
Chess Challenge!	Digital Leisure	No	Yes	Yes
chick chick BOOM; Chicken Battle! chick chick BOOM^{JP}	tons of bits, Arc System Works	Yes	Yes	Yes
Chindōchō!! Pole no Daibōken (On a Weird Way!! Pole's Big Adventure)	Sega	Yes	No	No
Christmas Clix	JV Games	No	Yes	No
Chronos Twins DX	EnjoyUP Games	No	Yes	Yes
Cocoto Fishing Master	Neko Entertainment	No	Yes	Yes
Cocoto Platform Jumper	Neko Entertainment	No	Yes	Yes
ColorZ	Exkee, Luck Plus	Yes	Yes	Yes
Contra ReBirth	Konami, M2	Yes	Yes	Yes
Copter Crisis	Digital Leisure	No	Yes	Yes
Cricket Challenge	Gameshastra	No	No	Yes
Critter Round-Up; Saku Saku Animal Panic^{JP}	Epicenter Studios, Konami	Yes	Yes	Yes
Cruise Party	Enjoy Gaming	No	Yes	Yes
Crystal Defenders R1	Square Enix	Yes	Yes	Yes
Crystal Defenders R2	Square Enix	Yes	Yes	Yes
Dart Rage	JV Games	No	Yes	No
Darts Wii	Alpha Unit	Yes	No	No
Deer Captor; Shika Gari^{JP}	Arc System Works	Yes	Yes	No
Defend Your Castle	XGen Studios	No	Yes	Yes
Derby Dogs; Derby Dog^{JP}	SIMS Co., Ltd., Aksys Games	Yes	Yes	No
Diatomic	Grendel Games	No	Yes	No
Diner Dash	Hudson Soft	Yes	Yes	Yes
Discipline: Teikoku no Tanjou	Marvelous Entertainment, Unigame Bunko	Yes	No	No
Dive: The Medes Islands Secret	Cosmonaut Games	No	Yes	Yes
Doc Clock: The Toasted Sandwich of Time	Stickmen Studios	No	Yes	No
Doc Louis's Punch-Out!! (Club Nintendo reward in North America)	Nintendo, Next Level Games	No	Yes	No
Downtown Nekketsu Dodgeball	Miracle Kidz	Yes	No	No
Dr. Mario Online Rx^{NA} Dr. Mario & Germ Buster^{PAL} Dr. Mario & Saikin Bokumetsu^{JP}	Nintendo, Arika	Yes	Yes	Yes
Dracula: Undead Awakening	Chillingo	No	Yes	Yes
Dragon Master Spell Caster	Stickmen Studios	No	Yes	Yes
Driift Mania	Konami	No	Yes	Yes
Drill Sergeant Mindstrong^{NA} Brain Cadets^{PAL} Onitore: Kyōkan wa Onigunsō^{JP}	HI Games & Publishing, Xseed Games, Rising Star Games	Yes	Yes	Yes
Drop Zone: Under Fire	Selectsoft	No	Yes	No
Eat! Fat! FIGHT! Tsuppari Ōzumō Wii Heya^{JP}	Tecmo	Yes	Yes	Yes
Eco Shooter: Plant 530^{NA} 530 Eco Shooter	Nintendo, Intelligent Systems	Yes	Yes	Yes
Eduardo the Samurai Toaster	Semnat Studios	No	Yes	No
Enjoy your massage!	Microforum Ltd.	No	Yes	Yes
Equilibrio; Katamuki Spirits^{JP}	DK Games, Marvelous Entertainment	Yes	Yes	Yes
escapeVektor: Chapter 1	Nnooo	No	Yes	Yes
Evasive Space; Kiken Kūiki^{JP}	Yuke's, High Voltage Software, Tryfirst	Yes	Yes	No
Excitebike: World Rally^{NA} Excitebike: World Challenge^{PAL} Excitebike: World Race^{JP}	Nintendo	Yes	Yes	Yes
Family & Friends Party	Gammick Entertainment	No	Yes	Yes
Family Card Games; Okiraku Daifugō Wii: Honkaku Wi-Fi Net Taisen^{JP}	Arc System Works	Yes	Yes	Yes
Family Games; Family Games: Pen & Paper Edition^{PAL}	Icon Games	No	Yes	Yes
Family Glide Hockey; Okiraku Air Hockey Wii^{JP}	Arc System Works	Yes	Yes	Yes
Family Go-Kart Racing; Okiraku Kart Wii^{JP}	Arc System Works	Yes	Yes	No
Family Mini Golf; Okiraku Putter Golf Wii^{JP}	Arc System Works	Yes	Yes	Yes
Family Pirate Party; Okiraku Sugoroku Wii^{JP}	Arc System Works	Yes	Yes	Yes
Family Slot Car Racing; Okiraku Slot Car Racing Wii^{JP}	Arc System Works	Yes	Yes	Yes
Family Table Tennis; Okiraku Ping Pong Wii^{JP}	Arc System Works	Yes	Yes	Yes
Family Tennis; Okiraku Tennis Wii^{JP}	Arc System Works	Yes	Yes	No
Fantasic Cube	Zoom Inc.	Yes	No	No
Fantasic Tambourine	Zoom Inc.	Yes	No	No
Fantasy Slots: Adventure Slots and Games	Big John Games	No	Yes	No
FAST Racing League	Shin'en Multimedia	No	Yes	Yes
Fast Draw Showdown	Digital Leisure	No	Yes	Yes
Fenimore Fillmore "The Westerner"	Revistronic	No	Yes	Yes
Final Fantasy Crystal Chronicles: My Life as a Darklord; Hikari to Yami no Himegimi to Sekai Seifuku no Tou: Final Fantasy Crystal Chronicles^{JP}	Square Enix	Yes	Yes	Yes
Final Fantasy Crystal Chronicles: My Life as a King; Chiisana Ōsama to Yakusoku no Kuni: Final Fantasy Crystal Chronicles^{JP}	Square Enix	Yes	Yes	Yes
Final Fantasy IV: The After Years; Final Fantasy IV: The After Years - Tsuki no Kikan^{JP}	Square Enix, Matrix Software	Yes	Yes	Yes
Fireplacing; My Fireplace^{PAL}	Korner Entertainment	No	Yes	Yes
Fish Tank	iFun4all	No	Yes	Yes
Fish'em All	Abylight	No	Yes	Yes
Fishie Fishie	DK Games	No	Yes	Yes
Flight Control	Firemint	No	Yes	Yes
Flowerworks; Flowerworks: Follie's Adventure^{PAL}	Nocturnal Entertainment	No	Yes	Yes
Fluidity; Hydroventure^{PAL}	Nintendo, Curve Digital	No	Yes	Yes
Frobot	Fugazo	No	Yes	No
Frogger Returns	Konami	Yes	Yes	Yes
Frogger: Hyper Arcade Edition	Konami	No	Yes	Yes
Full Blast Hitchhike; Let's Zenryoku Hitchhike!!!!!!!!!^{JP}	Nippon Ichi Software	Yes	No	No
Fun! Fun! Minigolf	Shin'en Multimedia	Yes	Yes	Yes
Furry Legends	Gamelion Studios	No	Yes	Yes
F・O・R・T・U・N・E: Hoshi no Furi Sosogu Oka	Cybird	Yes	No	No
Gabrielle's Ghostly Groove: Monster Mix; Ushimitsu Monstruo: Fushigina Oshiro no Dance Party^{JP}	Santa Entertainment, Natsume Inc.	Yes	Yes	Yes
Gene Labs	Frontline Studios	No	Yes	No
Ghost Mania	Legendo Entertainment	No	Yes	Yes
Ghost Mansion Party	Gameloft	Yes	Yes	Yes
GhostSlayer	Gevo Entertainment	No	Yes	No
Girlfriends Forever: Magic Skate	Kolkom	No	No	Yes
Gnomz	QubicGames	No	Yes	Yes
Gods vs. Humans	Artefacts Studio, Zallag	No	Yes	Yes
Gradius ReBirth	Konami, M2	Yes	Yes	Yes
Gravitronix	Medaverse Studios	No	Yes	No
Grill-Off with Ultra Hand!^{NA} (Club Nintendo reward in North America and Japan); Wii de Ultra Hand^{JP}	Nintendo	Yes	Yes	No
Gyrostarr	High Voltage Software	No	Yes	No
Hajīte! Block Rush	Agenda	Yes	No	No
Hamekomi Lucky Puzzle Wii Returns	Yuke's, Tryfirst	Yes	No	No
Happy Hammerin'; Tataite! Mogupon^{JP}	Agenda, Gamebridge	Yes	Yes	Yes
Harvest Moon: My Little Shop; Bokujō Monogatari Series: Makiba no Omise^{JP}	Marvelous Entertainment, Natsume Inc.	Yes	Yes	No
HB Arcade Cards	HB Studios	No	Yes	No
HB Arcade Disc Golf	HB Studios	No	Yes	No
Heavy Fire: Black Arms	Teyon	No	Yes	No
Heavy Fire: Special Operations	Teyon	No	Yes	Yes
Helix	Ghostfire Games	No	Yes	Yes
Heracles Chariot Racing	Neko Entertainment	No	Yes	Yes
Heron: Steam Machine	Triangle Studios	No	Yes	Yes
High Voltage Hot Rod Show	High Voltage Software	No	Yes	No
Hirameki Card Battle: Mekuruca	Tom Create	Yes	No	No
Hockey Allstar Shootout	Big Blue Bubble	No	Yes	No
Home Sweet Home	Big Blue Bubble	No	Yes	Yes
HoopWorld; HoopWorld: BasketBrawl^{PAL}	Streamline Studios, Virtual Toys	No	Yes	Yes
Horizon Riders	Sabarasa	No	Yes	Yes
Hubert the Teddy Bear: Winter Games	Teyon	No	Yes	No
Incoming!	JV Games	No	Yes	No
Inkub	Cosmonaut Games	No	Yes	No
Ivy the Kiwi? Mini	Prope, Bandai Namco, Xseed Games	Yes	No	No
Jam City Rollergirls	Frozen Codebase	No	Yes	Yes
Janken Party Paradise	Studio Zan	Yes	No	No
JellyCar 2	Disney Interactive Studios	No	Yes	No
Jett Rocket	Shin'en Multimedia	No	Yes	Yes
Jewel Keepers: Easter Island	Nordcurrent	No	Yes	Yes
Jinsei Game (The Game of Life)	Takara Tomy	Yes	No	No
Jinsei Game: Happy Step (The Game of Life: Happy Step)	Takara Tomy	Yes	No	No
Jintori Action! Taikōkenchi: Karakuri Shiro no Nazo	Perpetuum	Yes	No	No
Jungle Speed	Playful Entertainment	No	Yes	Yes
Just JAM	Big John Games	No	Yes	No
Kaku! Ugoku! Tsukamaeru! Sensei Wii	Takara Tomy	Yes	No	No
Kanken: Minna de Wai Wai Kanji Nou	IE Institute Co., Ltd.	Yes	No	No
Kappa-kun to Asobou: Kappa-kun no Ota no Shimikai	Cable Entertainment	Yes	No	No
Kappa-kun to Asobou: Kappa-kun to 3 Biki no Koneko	Cable Entertainment	Yes	No	No
Kappa-kun to Asobou: Kappa-kun to Mori no Nakamatachi (Play With Kappa: Kappa and Forest Friends)	Cable Entertainment	Yes	No	No
Karaoke Joysound (WiiWare); Karaoke Joysound Wii (WiiWare Hen)^{JP}	Brother International Corp., Hudson Soft, Xing Inc.	Yes	Yes	No
Karate Phants: Gloves of Glory (available from 2009-07-10 to 2012-06-30)	Snap Dragon	No	No	Yes
Kentei TV! Wii: Minna de Gotouchi Quiz Battle	Kosaido Co. Ltd.	Yes	No	No
Kentōshi: Furi Furi Boxing	Takara Tomy	Yes	No	No
Kodomo Kyōiku Terebi Wii: Aiue Ōchan	Home Media	Yes	No	No
Kodomo Kyōiku Terebi Wii: Aiue Ōmuzu	Home Media	Yes	No	No
Kotoba no Puzzle: Mojipittan Wii	Bandai Namco	Yes	No	No
Kung Fu Funk: Everybody is Kung Fu Fighting!	Stickmen Studios	No	Yes	Yes
Kyotokei	Microforum Ltd.	No	Yes	Yes
La-Mulana	Nigoro, Asterizm	Yes	Yes	Yes
Lead the Meerkats	Lapland Studio	No	Yes	Yes
Learning with The PooYoos: Episode 1 PooYoo to Asobou: Episode 1^{JP}	Lexis Numérique, Agatsuma Entertainment	Yes	Yes	Yes
Learning with The PooYoos: Episode 2	Lexis Numérique	No	Yes	Yes
Learning with The PooYoos: Episode 3	Lexis Numérique	No	Yes	Yes
Let's Catch	Sega, Prope	Yes	Yes	Yes
Licca-chan Oshare House	Takara Tomy	Yes	No	No
Liight	Studio Walljump	No	Yes	No
lilt line	Gaijin Games	No	Yes	Yes
Line Attack Heroes	Grezzo, Nintendo	Yes	No	No
LIT; School of Darkness^{JP}	WayForward Technologies, Square Enix	Yes	Yes	Yes
Little Tournament Over Yonder	Gevo Entertainment	No	Yes	Yes
Lonpos	Genki, Nintendo	Yes	Yes	Yes
LostWinds	Frontier Developments, Square Enix	Yes	Yes	Yes
LostWinds 2: Winter of the Melodias	Frontier Developments, Square Enix	Yes	Yes	Yes
Maboshi's Arcade^{NA} MaBoShi: The Three Shape Arcade^{PAL} Katachi no Game: Maru Bou Shikaku^{JP}	Nintendo, Mindware Corp	Yes	Yes	Yes
MadStone	RiverMan Media	No	Yes	No
Magic Destiny^{NA} Magic Destiny: Astrological Games^{PAL}	Shanblue Interactive	No	Yes	Yes
Magnetica Twist^{NA} Actionloop Twist^{PAL} Minna de Puzzloop^{JP}	Nintendo, Mitchell Corporation	Yes	Yes	Yes
Magnetis	Yullaby	No	Yes	Yes
Mahjong	Cosmigo, GameOn	No	No	Yes
Major League Eating: The Game^{NA} Major League Eating	Mastiff	Yes	Yes	No
Manic Monkey Mayhem	Pinnacle Entertainment Ltd.	No	Yes	Yes
Mart Racer	Joju Games	No	Yes	No
MDK2	Interplay	No	Yes	No
Mega Man 9 Rockman 9: Yabō no Fukkatsu!!^{JP}	Capcom, Inti Creates	Yes	Yes	Yes
Mega Man 10; Rockman 10: Uchū kara no Kyōi!!^{JP}	Capcom, Inti Creates	Yes	Yes	Yes
Midnight Bowling; Hamaru Bowling^{JP}	Gameloft	Yes	Yes	Yes
Midnight Pool; Hamaru Billiards^{JP}	Gameloft	Yes	Yes	Yes
miffy's world	Biodroid, PAN Vision	No	No	Yes
Military Madness: Nectaris; Nectaris^{JP}	Hudson Soft, Backbone Entertainment	Yes	Yes	Yes
Minna de Asobou: Koinu de Kururin (Play Together: Kururin as Puppies)	MTO	Yes	No	No
Minna de Taisen Puzzle: Shanghai Wii	Sunsoft	Yes	No	No
Minna de Tobikome! Penguin Diving: Hooper Looper	Agenda	Yes	No	No
Mister Bumblebee Racing Champion	h2f Informationssysteme	No	No	Yes
Mix Superstar	Digital Leisure	No	Yes	Yes
Moki Moki; Anata ga Mawashite Sukū Puzzle: Mochi Mochi Q^{JP}	Natsume Co., Ltd., Natsume Inc.	Yes	Yes	Yes
Monochrome Racing	Nordcurrent	No	Yes	Yes
MotoHeroz	RedLynx	No	Yes	Yes
Mouse House	Plaid World Studios	No	Yes	No
Mr. Driller W Mr. Driller World^{JP}	Bandai Namco	Yes	Yes	Yes
Muscle March; Muscle Kōshinkyoku^{JP}	Bandai Namco	Yes	Yes	Yes
My Aquarium; Blue Oasis: Sakana no Iyashi Kūken^{JP}	Hudson Soft	Yes	Yes	Yes
My Aquarium 2 Blue Oasis: Michinaru Shingai^{JP}	Hudson Soft	Yes	Yes	Yes
My Dolphin; Sea Farm: Iruka to Watashi no Showtime^{JP}	T&S Ltd.	Yes	Yes	No
My Little Baby	dtp young entertainment	No	Yes	Yes
My Planetarium^{NA} My Starry Night^{PAL} Planetarium^{JP}	Hudson Soft	Yes	Yes	Yes
My Pokémon Ranch; Minna no Pokemon Bokujō: Platina Taiōban^{JP}	Nintendo, Ambrella	Yes	Yes	Yes
My Zoo; Animal Life: Dōbutsu Fureai Seikatsu^{JP}	Hudson Soft	Yes	Yes	Yes
Möbius Drive	Jorudan Co. Ltd.	Yes	No	No
Neves Plus^{NA} Neves Plus: Pantheon of Tangrams^{PAL} (available from 2010-06-11 to 2012-06-30); Hamekomi Lucky Puzzle Wii^{JP}	Yuke's, Tryfirst, Abylight	Yes	Yes	Yes
Newton vs. The Horde	RadiationBurn	No	Yes	Yes
Niki – Rock 'n' Ball	Bplus	No	Yes	Yes
NyxQuest: Kindred Spirits	Over The Top Games, Agatsuma Entertainment	Yes	Yes	Yes
Oekaki Logic	G-Mode	Yes	No	No
Onslaught; Madsecta^{JP}	Hudson Soft, Shade	Yes	Yes	Yes
Order!!	Poisoft	Yes	No	No
Othello	Arc System Works	Yes	No	No
Ouchi de Mugen Puchi Puchi Wii	Bandai Namco	Yes	No	No
Out of Galaxy: Gin no Kōshika (available from 2009-04-14 to 2011-11-29 in Japan)	Sunsoft	Yes	No	No
Overflow	Digital Leisure	No	Yes	No
Overturn; Overturn: Mecha Wars^{PAL}	Studio Zan, Gamebridge	Yes	Yes	Yes
Paint Splash	KnapNok Games	No	Yes	Yes
Pallurikio	Playstos	No	Yes	Yes
Paper Wars: Cannon Fodder	iFun4all	No	Yes	Yes
Party Fun Pirate^{NA} Pop-up Pirate!^{PAL} Kurohige Kiki Ippatsu Wii^{JP}	Takara Tomy	Yes	Yes	Yes
Pearl Harbor Trilogy - 1941: Red Sun Rising	Legendo Entertainment	No	Yes	Yes
Penguins & Friends: Hey! That's My Fish! (available from 2009-05-22 to 2012-05-15 in Europe)	Gammick Entertainment	No	Yes	Yes
Phalanx	Zoom Inc.	Yes	No	No
Phoenix Wright: Ace Attorney; Gyakuten Saiban: Yomigaeru Gyakuten^{JP}	Capcom	Yes	Yes	Yes
Phoenix Wright: Ace Attorney − Justice for All; Gyakuten Saiban 2^{JP}	Capcom	Yes	Yes	Yes
Phoenix Wright: Ace Attorney − Trials and Tribulations; Gyakuten Saiban 3^{JP}	Capcom	Yes	Yes	Yes
PictureBook Games: Pop-Up Pursuit^{NA} PictureBook Games: A Pop-Up Adventure^{PAL} Asoberu Ehon Tobida Sugoroku!^{JP}	Nintendo	Yes	Yes	Yes
Pinocchio's Puzzle	EnjoyUp Games	No	Yes	No
Pirates: The Key of Dreams	Oxygen Games	No	Yes	Yes
Pit Crew Panic! (available from 2008-12-02 to 2012-03-30 in Japan)	Hudson Soft	Yes	Yes	Yes
Planet Fish	Ludia	No	Yes	No
Planet Pachinko	Allied Kingdoms	No	Yes	No
Play with Birds	Games Farm	No	Yes	No
Plättchen Twist 'n' Paint	Bplus	No	Yes	Yes
Poker Puzzle; Pokers Wii^{JP}	Milestone, UFO Interactive Games (unreleased)	Yes	No	No
Pokosuka Racing	Recom	Yes	No	No
Pokémon Fushigi no Dungeon: Ikuzo! Arashi no Bōkendan	Nintendo, Chunsoft	Yes	No	No
Pokémon Fushigi no Dungeon: Mezase! Hikari no Bōkendan	Nintendo, Chunsoft	Yes	No	No
Pokémon Fushigi no Dungeon: Susume! Honō no Bōkendan	Nintendo, Chunsoft	Yes	No	No
Pokémon Rumble; Melee! Pokemon Scramble^{JP}	Nintendo, Ambrella	Yes	Yes	Yes
Pong Toss Pro - Frat Party Games	JV Games	No	Yes	No
Pong Toss! Frat Party Games^{NA} Beer Pong! Frat Party Games^{PAL}	JV Games	No	Yes	Yes
Ponjan Wii	Takara Tomy	Yes	No	No
Pool Revolution: Cue Sports^{NA} Cue Sports: Snooker vs. Billiards^{PAL} Cue Sports: Wi-Fi Taisen Billiards^{JP}	Hudson Soft	Yes	Yes	Yes
Pop 'Em, Drop 'Em SameGame^{NA} Pop Them, Drop Them SameGame^{PAL} SameGame Wii^{JP}	Hudson Soft	Yes	Yes	Yes
Pop (available from 2008-07-29 to 2011-09-27 in Japan)	Nnooo, Electronic Arts	Yes	Yes	Yes
Popple to Mahou no Crayon (Popple and the Magical Crayon)	G-Mode	Yes	No	No
Potpourrii; Potpourrii: A delicate mixture of challenge and fun!^{PAL}	Abstraction Games	No	Yes	Yes
Protöthea	Digital Builders, Sabarasa, Ubisoft	No	Yes	Yes
Pub Darts	Big Blue Bubble	No	Yes	Yes
Pucca's kisses game	BigBen Interactive	No	Yes	Yes
Rabbids Lab	Ubisoft	No	Yes	Yes
Racers' Islands: Crazy Arenas	Artefacts Studio, Zallag	No	Yes	Yes
Racers' Islands: Crazy Racers	Artefacts Studio, Zellag	No	Yes	Yes
Rage of the Gladiator	Ghostfire Games	No	Yes	Yes
Rainbow Islands: Towering Adventure!	Taito	Yes	Yes	Yes
Reel Fishing Challenge; Fish Eyes Challenge^{JP}	Marvelous Entertainment, Natsume Inc.	Yes	Yes	Yes
Reel Fishing Challenge II	Marvelous Entertainment, Natsume Inc.	No	Yes	Yes
Reel Fishing Ocean Challenge	Marvelous Entertainment, Natsume Inc.	No	Yes	Yes
Robin Hood: The Return of Richard	Nordcurrent	No	Yes	Yes
Robocalypse: Beaver Defense	Vogster Entertainment	No	Yes	Yes
Robox	Dreambox Games	No	Yes	Yes
Rock N’ Roll Climber	Vitei, Nintendo	Yes	Yes	Yes
Rubik's Puzzle Galaxy: RUSH	Two Tribes	No	Yes	Yes
Rush Rush Rally Racing	Senile Team	No	No	Yes
Saikyou Ginsei Gomoku Narabe	Silver Star Japan, Electronic Arts	Yes	No	No
Saikyou Ginsei Igo	Silver Star Japan, Electronic Arts	Yes	No	No
Saikyou Ginsei Mahjong	Silver Star Japan, Electronic Arts	Yes	No	No
Saikyou Ginsei Shogi	Silver Star Japan, Electronic Arts	Yes	No	No
Sandy Beach; Beach de Oshiro wo Tsukutcha Wow!^{JP}	Konami	Yes	Yes	Yes
Save the Furries	SDP Games	No	Yes	Yes
Sekai no Omoshiro Party Game	SIMS Co., Ltd.	Yes	No	No
Sekai no Omoshiro Party Game 2	SIMS Co., Ltd.	Yes	No	No
Sexy Poker	Gameloft	No	Yes	Yes
ShadowPlay	Deep Fried Entertainment	No	Yes	No
Shikakui Atama wo Maru Kusuru: Mainichi Minna no Challenge Hen	Nichinoken, IE Institute Co., Ltd.	Yes	No	No
Shootanto: Evolutionary Mayhem; Shootanto: Kako Hen^{JP} (available from 2008-12-09 to 2011-05-31 in Japan)	Grand Prix Games, Hudson Soft	Yes	Yes	Yes
Silver Star Chess; Saikyou Ginsei Chess^{JP}	Silver Star Japan, Electronic Arts, Agetec	Yes	Yes	No
Silver Star Reversi; Saikyou Ginsei Reversi^{JP}	Silver Star Japan, Electronic Arts, Agetec	Yes	Yes	No
Simple Series Vol. 1: The Block Kuzushi neo	Tam Soft, D3 Publisher	Yes	No	No
Simple Series Vol. 2: The Number Puzzle neo	Tam Soft, D3 Publisher	Yes	No	No
Simple Series Vol. 3: The Mahjong	Tam Soft, D3 Publisher	Yes	No	No
Simple Series Vol. 4: The Misshitsu kara no Dasshutsu	Intense, D3 Publisher	Yes	No	No
Simple Series Vol. 5: The Judo	Tam Soft, D3 Publisher	Yes	No	No
Snail Mail	Sandlot Games	No	Yes	No
Sneezies	Chillingo	No	Yes	Yes
Snowboard Riot; Board Warriors^{JP} (available from 2009-02-10 to 2012-03-30 in Japan)	Hudson Soft	Yes	Yes	Yes
Snowpack Park; Penguin Seikatsu^{JP}	Nintendo	Yes	Yes	No
Soccer Bashi	Icon Games	No	Yes	Yes
Soccer Up!^{NA} Football Up!^{PAL}	EnjoyUp Games	No	Yes	Yes
Solitaire	Cosmigo, GameOn	No	No	Yes
Sonic the Hedgehog 4: Episode I	Sega	Yes	Yes	Yes
Sorcery Blade	Kemco	Yes	No	No
Space Invaders Get Even	Taito, Cattle Call	Yes	Yes	Yes
Space Trek	Calaris	No	Yes	No
Spaceball Revolution	Virtual Toys	No	Yes	Yes
SPOGS Racing	D2C Games	No	Yes	Yes
Spot the Differences!	Sanuk Games	No	Yes	Yes
Star Soldier R	Hudson Soft	Yes	Yes	Yes
Step Up!	GolemLabs & Zoozen	No	Yes	No
Stonekeep: Bones of the Ancestors	Alpine Studios, Interplay	No	Yes	No
Stop Stress: A Day of Fury	Abylight	No	Yes	Yes
Strong Bad's Cool Game for Attractive People	Telltale Games	No	Yes	Yes
Stunt Cars	Icon Games	No	Yes	Yes
Successfully Learning English: Year 2	Tivola	No	No	Yes
Successfully Learning English: Year 3	Tivola	No	No	Yes
Successfully Learning English: Year 4	Tivola	No	No	Yes
Successfully Learning English: Year 5	Tivola	No	No	Yes
Successfully Learning German: Year 2	Tivola	No	No	Yes
Successfully Learning German: Year 3	Tivola	No	No	Yes
Successfully Learning German: Year 4	Tivola	No	No	Yes
Successfully Learning German: Year 5	Tivola	No	No	Yes
Successfully Learning Mathematics: Year 2	Tivola	No	No	Yes
Successfully Learning Mathematics: Year 3	Tivola	No	No	Yes
Successfully Learning Mathematics: Year 4	Tivola	No	No	Yes
Successfully Learning Mathematics: Year 5	Tivola	No	No	Yes
Sudoku Challenge!	Digital Leisure	No	Yes	Yes
Sugarbunnies Wii: Yōkoso Bunnies Field e (available from 2009-09-29 to 2012-05-22 in Japan)	Takara Tomy	Yes	No	No
Sugu Suro Duo: New Pulsar R&V	Yamasa Entertainment	Yes	No	No
Swords & Soldiers	Ronimo Games	No	Yes	Yes
Tales of Elastic Boy: Mission 1	Lexis Numérique	No	Yes	Yes
Tales of Monkey Island	Telltale Games	No	Yes	Yes
Target Toss Pro: Bags	Incredible Technologies, n-Space	No	Yes	No
Target Toss Pro: Lawn Darts	Incredible Technologies, n-Space	No	Yes	No
Tenshi no Solitaire	G-Mode	Yes	No	No
Texas Hold'em Poker	Gameloft	No	Yes	Yes
Texas Hold'em Tournament	Digital Leisure	No	Yes	Yes
The Amazing Brain Train!	Grubby Games	No	Yes	No
The Incredible Maze; Chokkan! Balance Labyrinth^{JP} (available from 2009-12-08 to 2012-05-22 in Japan)	Digital Leisure, Gameloft	Yes	Yes	Yes
The Magic Obelisk; Shadow Walker: Kage no Shōnen to Hikari no Yōsei^{JP}	Game Arts	Yes	Yes	No
The Mystery of Whiterock Castle	RTL Playtainment	No	Yes	Yes
The Tales of Bearsworth Manor: Chaotic Conflicts; Kumanage Battle Hen: Kīna no Kiraina Aoi Hōseki^{JP}	Square Enix	Yes	Yes	Yes
The Tales of Bearsworth Manor: Puzzling Pages; Kumanage Puzzle Hen: Pīna no Sukina Akai Candy^{JP}	Square Enix	Yes	Yes	Yes
The Three Musketeers: One for all!	Legendo Entertainment	No	Yes	Yes
The Very Hungry Caterpillar's ABCs (available from 2012-01-26 to 2012-11-30 in Europe); Harapeko Aomushi no ABC^{JP}	Cybird	Yes	Yes	Yes
The Will of Dr. Frankenstein	Enjoy Gaming	No	No	Yes
ThruSpace^{NA} ThruSpace: High Velocity 3D Puzzle^{PAL} Surinuke Anatōsu^{JP}	Keys Factory, Nintendo	Yes	Yes	Yes
Tiki Towers	RealNetworks	No	Yes	No
TNT Racers	dtp Entertainment	No	Yes	Yes
Toki Tori	Two Tribes	No	Yes	Yes
Tokyo City Nights	Gameloft	Yes	No	No
Tomena Sanner; Tomena Sanner Wii^{JP}	Konami	Yes	Yes	Yes
Tomy Car Drive Shutsudou! Kinkyū Sharyou Hen	Takara Tomy	Yes	No	No
Toribash; Toribash: Violence Perfected^{PAL}	Nabi Studios	No	Yes	Yes
Trenches Generals	Fishing Cactus	No	Yes	Yes
Triple Jumping Sports	The Code Monkeys	No	Yes	No
Triple Running Sports	The Code Monkeys	No	Yes	No
Triple Shot Sports	The Code Monkeys	No	Yes	No
Triple Throwing Sports	The Code Monkeys	No	Yes	No
Tsūshin Taikyoku: Hayazashi Shogi Sandan	Nintendo	Yes	No	No
Tsūshin Taikyoku: Igo Dōjō 2700-Mon	Nintendo	Yes	No	No
Tumblebugs 2	Wildfire Studios, Gameshastra	No	Yes	No
TV Show King	Gameloft	Yes	Yes	Yes
TV Show King 2	Gameloft	No	Yes	Yes
Ubongo	Korner Entertainment	No	Yes	Yes
UNO	Gameloft	Yes	Yes	Yes
Unou Kids: Okigaru Unou Training	IE Institute Co., Ltd.	Yes	No	No
Urbanix	Nordcurrent	No	Yes	Yes
V.I.P. Casino: Blackjack	High Voltage Software	No	Yes	No
Vampire Crystals	Shanblue Interactive	No	Yes	Yes
Violin Paradise	Keystone Game Studio	No	Yes	Yes
Viral Survival peakvox escape virus^{JP}	Fun Unit, Nippon Ichi Software, Peakvox	Yes	Yes	Yes
Voodoo Dice	Exkee, Ubisoft	No	Yes	Yes
WarioWare D.I.Y. Showcase^{NA} WarioWare: Do It Yourself - Showcase^{PAL} Asobu Made in Ore^{JP}	Nintendo, Intelligent Systems	Yes	Yes	Yes
WarMen Tactics	Calaris	No	Yes	No
Water Warfare; Bang Bang Kids^{JP}	Hudson Soft	Yes	Yes	Yes
Wild West Guns	Gameloft	Yes	Yes	Yes
Word Searcher	Digital Leisure	No	Yes	Yes
Word Searcher Deluxe	Digital Leisure	No	Yes	No
World of Goo; Goo no Wakusei^{JP}	2D Boy, Nintendo	Yes	Yes	Yes
Xmas Puzzle	EnjoyUp Games	No	Yes	No
Yakuman Wii: Ide Yosuke no Kenkou Mahjong	Nintendo, Spice Games	Yes	No	No
Yard Sale Hidden Treasures: Sunnyville	Konami	No	Yes	Yes
Yomi Kikase Asobi Wii	Perpetuum	Yes	No	No
You, Me, and the Cubes; Kimi to Boku to Rittai^{JP}	Nintendo, Fyto	Yes	Yes	Yes
Yummy Yummy Cooking Jam	Virtual Toys	No	Yes	Yes
Zombie Panic in Wonderland; Zombie in Wonderland^{JP}	Akaoni Studio, Marvelous Entertainment	Yes	Yes	Yes
Zombii Attack	Gamers Digital, Motiviti	No	Yes	No
Zoo Disc Golf	Sonalysts	No	Yes	No

== Released applications ==
There are 12 applications included in the list.

Title and Source	Developer(s)/Publisher(s)	JP	NA	PAL
Cozy Fire; Cosy Fire^{PAL}	dtp young entertainment	No	Yes	Yes
Crunchyroll	Crunchyroll	No	Yes	No
Game Sound Station	Gust Corporation	Yes	No	No
Happy Holidays: Christmas	505 Games	No	Yes	Yes
Happy Holidays: Halloween	505 Games	No	Yes	Yes
Let's Create! Pottery	Infinite Dreams Inc.	No	Yes	No
Minna no Theater Wii (available from 2009-01-27 to 2011-04-30)	Fuji Soft	Yes	No	No
Osu! Exercise Dōjō	IE Institute Co., Ltd.	Yes	No	No
Physio Fun: Balance Training	Kaasa Solution	No	No	Yes
Physio Fun: Pelvic Floor Training	Kaasa Solution	No	No	Yes
Princess Ai Monogatari (no longer available)	Sunsoft	Yes	No	No
Raku Raku Kinen Appli Wii: Kinenka no Isha ga Oshieru Nanoka de Yamaru Hōhō	Silver Star Japan, Mayumi Abe	Yes	No	No

== Released games on disc ==
There are 15 games included in the list.

Title and Source	Developer(s)/Publisher(s)	JP	NA	PAL
Bit.Trip Beat	Gaijin Games, Aksys Games	Yes	Yes	Yes
Bit.Trip Core; Bit.Trip Core: Rhythm Seijin no Gyakushū^{JP}	Gaijin Games, Aksys Games	Yes	Yes	Yes
Bit.Trip Fate	Gaijin Games, Aksys Games	No	Yes	Yes
Bit.Trip Flux	Gaijin Games, Aksys Games	No	Yes	Yes
Bit.Trip Runner; Bit.Trip Runner: Rhythm Seijin no Gekisou^{JP}	Gaijin Games, Aksys Games	Yes	Yes	Yes
Bit.Trip Void; Bit.Trip Void: Rhythm Seijin no Danmaku^{JP}	Gaijin Games, Aksys Games	Yes	Yes	Yes
Deer Drive Legends	Maximum Games	No	Yes	Yes
Groovin' Blocks	Empty Clip Studios	No	Yes	No
Max & the Magic Marker; Rakugaki Hero^{JP}	Press Play, Marvelous Entertainment	Yes	Yes	Yes
Retro City Rampage	Vblank Entertainment	No	Yes	Yes
Tetris Party	Hudson Soft	Yes	Yes	Yes
Where's Wally? Fantastic Journey 1 (available from 2011-03-25 to 2012-12-31)	Ludia	No	Yes	No
Where's Wally? Fantastic Journey 2 (available from 2011-04-15 to 2012-12-31)	Ludia	No	Yes	No
Where's Wally? Fantastic Journey 3 (available from 2011-05-06 to 2012-12-31)	Ludia	No	Yes	No
Tsūshin Taikyoku: World Chess (Wii Chess)	Nintendo	Yes	No	Yes

== See also ==
- Lists of Virtual Console games
- List of DSiWare games and applications
- List of Nintendo 3DS games
- List of Wii U software
