= List of video game franchises =

This is a list of video game franchises, organized alphabetically. All entries include multiple video games, not counting ports or altered re-releases.

== 0–9 ==
- 1080° Snowboarding
- 1942
- 3D Ultra Minigolf
- 3-D Ultra Pinball
- 7th Dragon
- The 7th Guest

== A ==
- A Boy and His Blob
- Ace Attorney
- Ace Combat
- ActRaiser
- Adventure Island
- Adventures of Lolo
- Aero Fighters
- Aero the Acro-Bat
- After Burner
- Age of Empires
- Age of Wonders
- Airforce Delta
- Alan Wake
- Aleste
- Alex Kidd
- Alien Breed
- Alien Syndrome
- Alone in the Dark
- Alpine Racer
- Altered Beast
- Alundra
- American McGee's Alice
- America's Army
- Amnesia
- Amped
- Angry Birds
- Animal Crossing
- Anno
- Anomaly
- Another Century's Episode
- Another Code
- Ape Escape
- Arc the Lad
- Arkanoid
- ARMA
- Armored Core
- Army Men
- Army of Two
- Art Academy
- Ar Tonelico
- Asheron's Call
- Asphalt
- Assassin's Creed
- Assault Heroes
- Asteroids
- Astro
- Atelier
- ATV Offroad Fury
- Audiosurf
- Avadon

== B ==
- Babylonian Castle Saga
- Backyard Sports
- Baldur's Gate
- Bangai-O
- Banjo-Kazooie
- Baraduke
- Bard's Tale
- Baseball Stars
- Bases Loaded
- Batman
  - Batman: Arkham
- Battle Arena Toshinden
- Battlefield
- Battle Gear
- Battle Isle
- Battlestations
- Battletoads
- Battlezone
- Bayonetta
- Beat Hazard
- Beatmania
- Bendy
- Bejeweled
- Big Brain Academy
- Bionic Commando
- BioShock
- Bit.Trip
- The Black Mirror
- Black Souls
- Black & White
- Blaster Master
- BlazBlue
- Blazing Angels
- Blinx
- Blitz: The League
- Blood
- Blood Bowl
- BloodRayne
- Bloody Roar
- Blue Dragon
- Bobby Carrot
- Boktai
- Boku no Natsuyasumi
- Bomberman
- Bomb Jack
- Bonk
- Boom Blox
- Border Break
- Borderlands
- Bosconian
- Boulder Dash
- BoxBoy!
- Brain Age
- Bravely
- Breakout
- Breath of Fire
- Bridge Constructor
- Broken Sword
- Brothers in Arms
- Bubble Bobble
- Bubsy
- Budget Cuts
- Burgertime
- Burnout
- Bushido Blade
- Bus Simulator
- Buster Bros.
- Bust a Groove
- Buzz!

== C ==
- Cabela's
- Call of Duty
- Call of Juarez
- Candy Crush
- Cannon Fodder
- Capcom Vs. SNK
- Carmageddon
- Car Mechanic Simulator
- Carmen Sandiego
- Carnival Games
- Castle Shikigami
- Castlevania
- Centipede
- Championship Manager
- Chaos Rings
- Chase H.Q.
- Chessmaster
- Chibi-Robo!
- Chip's Challenge
- Chivalry
- Choplifter
- Chrono
- City Connection
- Civilization
- ClayFighter
- Clicker Heroes
- Clock Tower
- Clockwork Knight
- Close Combat
- Clubhouse Games
- Colin McRae Rally
- Colony Wars
- Columns
- Combat Mission
- Combat Wings
- Command & Conquer
- Commander Keen
- Commandos
- Company of Heroes
- Condemned
- The Conduit
- Conker
- Contra
- Cooking Mama
- Cool Boarders
- Corpse Party
- Cotton
- Counter-Strike
- Crackdown
- Crash Bandicoot
- Crazy Castle
- Crazy Chicken / Moorhuhn
- Crazy Taxi
- Creatures
- The Crew
- Crimson Skies
- Croc
- Cruis'n
- Crusader Kings
- Crush Pinball
- Crysis
- The Culling
- Custom Robo
- Cut the Rope
- Cyber Sled

== D ==
- D
- Dance Central
- Dance Dance Revolution
- Danganronpa
- Darius
- Dark Cloud
- The Dark Pictures
- Dark Seed
- Dark Souls
- Darkstalkers
- Daytona USA
- DC Comics
- de Blob
- Dead Frontier
- Dead Island
- Deadly Premonition
- Dead or Alive
- Dead Rising
- Dead Space
- Dead to Rights
- Deathsmiles
- DeathSpank
- Deer Hunter
- Defense Grid
- Def Jam
- Defender
- Delta Force
- Densha de Go!
- Descent
- Desperados
- Destroy All Humans!
- Deus Ex
- Devil Children
- Devil May Cry
- Diablo
- Dies irae
- Dig Dug
- Dino Crisis
- Disaster Report
- Disgaea
- Dishonored
- Disney Infinity
- Divinity
- Dizzy
- Donkey Kong
  - Donkey Kong Country
- DonPachi
- Doom
- Dota
- Double Dragon
- Dragon Age
- Dragon Ball
- Dragon Buster
- Dragon Force
- Dragon Quest
- Dragon Slayer
- Dragon Spirit
- Dragon's Lair
- Drakengard
- Drawn to Life
- Dream Chronicles
- Driver
- Duke Nukem
- Dungeon Defenders
- Dungeon Explorer
- Dungeon Keeper
- Dungeon Siege
- Dying Light
- Dynasty Warriors

== E ==
- Earth Defense Force
- Earthworm Jim
- Ecco the Dolphin
- El Dorado Gate
- Elden Ring
- The Elder Scrolls
- Elevator Action
- Empire Earth
- Eternal Champions
- Etrian Odyssey
- Europa Universalis
- EverQuest
- Everybody's Golf
- Evil Genius
- The Evil Within
- eXceed
- Excite
- Exerion
- Exit
- EyeToy

== F ==
- F1 Circus
- F-Zero
- Fable
- Fallout
- Famicom Grand Prix
- Famicom Tantei Club
- Family Game Night
- Family Party
- Family Stadium
- The Fancy Pants Adventures
- Fantasy Zone
- Fate
- Far Cry
- Far East of Eden
- Farming Simulator
- Fatal Frame
- Fatal Fury
- Fat Princess
- F.E.A.R.
- Fieldrunners
- FIFA
- Fighting Vipers
- Final Fantasy
- Final Lap
- Fire Emblem
- Five Nights at Freddy's
- FlatOut
- Flowers
- Football Manager
- Forza
- Fossil Fighters
- Frequency
- Frogger
- Front Mission
- Frostpunk

== G ==
- Game Party
- G-Police
- Gabriel Knight
- Gal Gun
- Galaxian
- Galaxy Force
- Game Tengoku
- Ganbare Goemon
- Gauntlet
- Gears of War
- Gekisha Boy
- Geneforge
- Genpei Tōma Den
- Geometry Wars
- The Getaway
- Gex
- Ghosts 'n Goblins
- Giana Sisters
- Giga Wing
- Glory of Heracles
- God Eater
- God of War
- Golden Axe
- Golden Sun
- Golden Tee Golf
- The Golf Club
- Golly! Ghost!
- Gothic
- Gradius
- Gran Turismo
- Grand Theft Auto
- Grandia
- Groove Coaster
- Ground Control
- Growlanser
- Guacamelee!
- Guardian Heroes
- Guild
- Guild Wars
- Guilty Gear
- Guitar Hero
- Gunbird
- Gundam
- Gunpey
- Gunslinger Stratos
- Gunstar Heroes
- Gunvolt

== H ==
- .hack
- Half-Life
- Halo
- Hammerin' Harry
- Hang-On
- Hard Drivin'
- Harry Potter
- Harvest Moon
- Hatsune Miku: Project DIVA
- Hat Trick Hero
- Hearts of Iron
- Hebereke
- Heiankyo Alien
- Herzog
- Hexic
- Hidden & Dangerous
- Hitman
- Homeworld
- Horizon
- Hotline Miami
- The House of the Dead
- Hyperdimension Neptunia
- Hydlide
- Hydro Thunder

== I ==
- Icewind Dale
- The Idolmaster
- Ikari Warriors
- Illusion
- Image Fight
- Imagine
- Inazuma Eleven
- Infamous
- Infinity
- Infinity Blade
- Injustice
- International Superstar Soccer
- Invizimals
- Iron Soldier
- Itadaki Street

== J ==
- Jagged Alliance
- Jak and Daxter
- Jake Hunter
- James Bond
- Jazz Jackrabbit
- J.B. Harold
- Jetpac
- Jet Moto
- Jet Set Radio
- Joe & Mac
- Joe Danger
- The Journeyman Project
- Juiced
- Jumping Flash!
- Just Cause
- Just Dance

== K ==
- Kane & Lynch
- Kao the Kangaroo
- Katamari
- Keyboardmania
- Kid Icarus
- Kid Niki
- KiKi KaiKai
- Killer Instinct
- Killing Floor
- Killzone
- Kinect Sports
- Kingdom Come: Deliverance
- Kingdom Hearts
- The King of Fighters
- King's Field
- King's Quest
- Kirby
- Klonoa
- Knack
- Knights of the Old Temple
- Kotoba no Puzzle
- Kunio-kun
- Kururin
- Kyle Hyde

== L ==
- Lands of Lore
- Langrisser
- The Last Blade
- Last Ninja
- The Last of Us
- League of Legends
- Left 4 Dead
- Legacy of Kain
- Legend of Legaia
- The Legendary Starfy
- The Legend of Heroes
  - Trails
- The Legend of Kage
- The Legend of Zelda
- Lego
- Lego Ninjago
- Leisure Suit Larry
- Lemmings
- Lethal Enforcers
- Life Is Strange
- Lineage
- Links
- Lips
- LittleBigPlanet
- Little Nightmares
- Lode Runner
- The Lord of the Rings
- Lost Kingdoms
- Lost Planet
- The Lost Vikings
- Lotus
- LovePlus
- Lucky's Tale
- Lufia
- Luigi
- Lumines
- Lunar

== M ==
- Madden NFL
- Mafia
- Magical Drop
- Mana
- Manhunt
- Maniac Mansion
- Mappy
- Mario
  - Dr. Mario
  - Mario Kart
  - Mario Party
  - Mario sports
  - Mario RPG
  - Mario vs. Donkey Kong
  - Super Mario
- Marvel
- Marvel vs. Capcom
- Mass Effect
- Master of Orion
- Math Blaster
- Matt Hazard
- Max Payne
- MechAssault
- MechWarrior
- Medal of Honor
- MediEvil
- Mega Man
- Megami Tensei
- Mercenaries
- Metal Gear
- Metal Max
- Metal Slug
- Metro
- Metroid
- Microsoft Combat Flight Simulator
- Microsoft Flight Simulator
- Midnight Club
- Midtown Madness
- Might and Magic
- Milon's Secret Castle
- Minecraft
- Mirror's Edge
- MLB 2K
- MLB: The Show
- Momoko 120%
- Momotaro Densetsu
- Momotaro Dentetsu
- Monaco GP
- Monkey Island
- Monster Hunter
- Monster Rancher
- Monster Truck Madness
- Monument Valley
- Mortal Kombat
- Mother
- Motocross Madness
- MotoGP
- Moto Racer
- MotorStorm
- Mount & Blade
- Moving Out
- Mr. Do!
- Mr. Driller
- MX vs. ATV
- Myst
- Mystery Dungeon
- Myth

== N ==
- N
- Namco Anthology
- Namco Museum
- Nancy Drew
- Naruto: Ultimate Ninja
- NASCAR
- Navy Field
- NBA 2K
- NBA Live
- NBA Jam
- NCAA Football
- Nectaris / Military Madness
- Need for Speed
- Nekopara
- NES Remix
- Neutopia
- Neverwinter Nights
- NFL 2K
- NHL (EA Sports)
- Nidhogg
- Ni no Kuni
- NieR
- Nights
- Ninja Gaiden
- Ninja JaJaMaru-kun
- Nintendogs
- Nioh
- Nobunaga's Ambition
- No More Heroes
- Numan Athletics

== O ==
- Oddworld
- Ogre
- Ōkami
- Onechanbara
- One Piece
- One Must Fall
- Onimusha
- Operation Wolf
- Orcs Must Die!
- The Oregon Trail
- Osu! Tatakae! Ouendan
- Otogi
- Otomedius
- Outlast
- Out Run
- Overcooked

== P ==
- Pac-Man
  - Pac-Man World
- Panzer Dragoon
- Papa Louie
- PaRappa the Rapper
- Parasite Eve
- Parkan
- Parodius
- Patapon
- Pathologic
- Payday
- Peggle
- Pengo
- Penumbra
- Perfect Dark
- Persona
- Petz
- PGA Tour
- Phantasy Star
- Pikmin
- Pillars of Eternity
- Pilotwings
- Pinball FX
- Pirate Ship Higemaru
- Pitfall!
- PixelJunk
- PlanetSide
- Plants vs. Zombies
- PUBG
- Point Blank
- Pokémon
  - Pokémon Pinball
  - Pokémon Play It!
  - Pokémon Puzzle
  - Pokémon Ranger
  - Pokémon Snap
  - Pokémon Stadium
  - PokéPark
- Pole Position
- The Political Machine
- Pong
- Populous
- Portal
- Postal
- Power Pros
- Power Stone
- Prince of Persia
- Princess Maker
- Pro Evolution Soccer
- Professor Layton
- Project Gotham Racing
- Project X Zone
- Prototype
- Psychonauts
- Punch-Out!!
- Pushmo
- Putt-Putt
- Puyo Puyo
- Puzzle Bobble
- Puzzle & Dragons
- Puzzle League
- Puzzle Quest

== Q ==
- Q*bert
- Qix
- Quake
- Quest for Glory

== R ==
- R-Type
- Raiden
- Railroad Tycoon
- Rakugaki Ōkoku
- Rampage
- Rally-X
- Rhapsody
- Rastan
- Ratchet & Clank
- RayForce
- Rayman
  - Raving Rabbids
- R.C. Pro-Am
- Red Dead
- Red Faction
- Red Steel
- Remnant
- Resident Evil
- Resistance
- Retro Game Challenge
- Return Fire
- Rhythm Heaven
- Rick Dangerous
- Ridge Racer
- Risen
- Risk of Rain
- Road Fighter
- Road Rash
- Robopon
- Robot
- Robotron: 2084
- Rock Band
- Rod Land
- Rogue Legacy
- RollerCoaster Tycoon
- Rolling Thunder
- Romance of the Three Kingdoms
- RPG Maker
- Rugby League
- Rumble Roses
- Rune Factory
- Runescape
- Rush
- Rush'n Attack
- Rygar

== S ==
- Sabreman
- SaGa
- Saints Row
- Sakura Wars
- Salamander
- Sam & Max
- Samurai Shodown
- Samurai Warriors
- Sanctum
- Scene It?
- Schoolgirl Strikers
- Science Adventure
- Scramble
- Scribblenauts
- Sea Battle
- Seaman
- Sega Ages
- Sega Bass Fishing
- Sega Rally
- Sengoku Basara
- Senran Kagura
- Serious Sam
- The Settlers
- Shadowgate
- Shadow Man
- Shadow of the Beast
- Shadow Warrior
- Shank
- Shantae
- Shenmue
- Sherlock Holmes
- Shining
- Shinobi
- Shōnen Jump
- Shoot Away
- Silent Hill
- Silent Scope
- Silpheed
- SimCity
- Simple
- The Sims
- Sin and Punishment
- SingStar
- Skate
- Skylanders
- Sly Cooper
- Snake Rattle 'n' Roll
- Sniper Elite
- Sniper: Ghost Warrior
- Snowboard Kids
- SOCOM
- Soldier of Fortune
- Sonic Blast Man
- Sonic the Hedgehog
- Soulcalibur
- South Park
- Space Channel 5
- Space Empires
- Space Harrier
- Space Invaders
- Space Quest
- Speedball
- SpellForce
- Spider-Man
- Splashdown
- Splatoon
- Splatterhouse
- 'Splosion Man
- SpongeBob SquarePants
- Spy Hunter
- Spyro
- SSX
- S.T.A.L.K.E.R.
- Star Control
- Star Force
- Star Fox
- Star Luster
- Star Ocean
- Star Raiders
- Star Wars
  - Star Wars: Battlefront
- StarCraft
- Star Soldier
- StarTropics
- State of Decay
- SteamWorld
- Steel Battalion
- Steel Division
- Steel Gunner
- Story of Seasons
- Street Fighter
- Streets of Rage
- Strider
- Strikers 1945
- Stronghold
- Subnautica
- Suikoden
- Summon Night
- Super Mega Baseball
- Super Monkey Ball
- Super Robot Wars
- Super Smash Bros.
- Supreme Commander
- Surgeon Simulator
- Sutte Hakkun
- Swordquest
- Syberia
- Syndicate
- Syphon Filter
- System Shock

== T ==
- Taiko no Tatsujin
- Taito Memories
- Tak
- Tales
- Tales from Space
- Tank Battalion
- Team Fortress
- Tecmo Bowl
- Teenage Mutant Ninja Turtles
- Tekken
- Tempest
- Tenchu
- Terra Cresta
- Test Drive
- Tetris
- Thief
- This Is Football
- Thunder Ceptor
- Thunder Cross
- Thunder Force
- Tiger Heli
- Time Crisis
- Time Pilot
- TimeSplitters
- Titanfall
- Tobal
- TOCA
- ToeJam & Earl
- Tokimeki Memorial
- Tom Clancy's
  - Tom Clancy's The Division
  - Tom Clancy's Ghost Recon
  - Tom Clancy's H.A.W.X
  - Tom Clancy's Rainbow Six
  - Tom Clancy's Splinter Cell
- Tomb Raider
- Tomodachi Collection
- Tony Hawk's
- Torchlight
- Total Annihilation
- Total War
- Touch! Generations
- Touhou Project
- Toukiden
- Track & Field
- Train Simulator
- Transformers
- Trauma Center
- Trials
- Tribes
- Trine
- Tropico
- Truck Simulator
- True Crime
- Truxton
- Turok
- Turrican
- Twilight Syndrome
- TwinBee
- Twisted Metal
- Two Worlds
- Ty the Tasmanian Tiger

== U ==
- Ultima
- Uncharted
- Unravel
- Unreal
- Uridium

== V ==
- Valis
- Valkyria Chronicles
- Valkyrie
- Valkyrie Profile
- Vampire: The Masquerade
- Vandal Hearts
- Vanguard
- Vectorman
- Vib-Ribbon
- Viewtiful Joe
- Vigilante 8
- Violence Fight
- Virtua Cop
- Virtua Fighter
- Virtua Striker
- Virtua Tennis
- Virtual On
- Viva Piñata
- V-Rally

== W ==
- Wagan Land
- The Walking Dead
- Wangan Midnight
- Warcraft
- Warhammer 40,000
- Warhammer Fantasy
- Wario
  - WarioWare
  - Wario Land
- Warlords
- Wars
- Wasteland
- Watch Dogs
- Wave Race
- White Knight Chronicles
- Wii
- Wild Arms
- Wing Commander
- Winning Run
- Wipeout
- The Witcher
- Wizardry
- Wizards & Warriors
- Wolf Fang
- Wolfenstein
- Wonder Boy
- Wonder Momo
- Wonder Project
- World Heroes
- World Stadium
- Worms
- Wrecking Crew
- WWE 2K

== X ==
- X (Egosoft)
- X (Nintendo)
- Xanadu
- X-COM
- Xeno
  - Xenogears
  - Xenosaga
  - Xenoblade
- Xevious

== Y ==
- Yakuza
- Yie Ar Kung-Fu
- Yo-kai Watch
- Yooka-Laylee
- Yoshi
- You Don't Know Jack
- Ys
- Yu-Gi-Oh!

== Z ==
- Zanac
- Zaxxon
- Zero Escape
- Zill O'll
- Zombie Tycoon
- Zone of the Enders
- Zool
- Zoombinis
- Zoo Tycoon
- Zork
- Zuma
- Zumba Fitness

== See also ==
- List of best-selling video game franchises
- Lists of video games

== Notes ==
General

Sales
