= Super Motherload =

2013 video game

- Developer: XGen Studios
- Publisher: XGen Studios
- Designer: Skye Boyes
- Engine: PhyreEngine
- Platforms: PlayStation 4 PlayStation 3 Windows
- Release: PS4: NA: November 15, 2013; EU: November 22, 2013; PS3: NA: November 26, 2013; EU: November 27, 2013; Windows; April 4, 2014
- Genre: Action
- Modes: Single-player, multiplayer

Super Motherload is a video game developed by XGen Studios for the PlayStation 4. It was originally released on November 15, 2013, with later releases for PlayStation 3 and Windows. Super Motherload is the sequel to Motherload, an Adobe Flash game also developed by XGen Studios, released in 2004. In the game, players work for a corporation to collect minerals and gems on Mars.

== Gameplay ==
The basic gameplay is similar to that of Motherload, with some new additions. Players drill, collect minerals, and return to base when fuel runs out to refuel, repair, sell minerals, and upgrade their digging machine. New to Super Motherload are underground bases which serve as checkpoints, preventing the need for players to return to the surface each time they fill up their cargo bay. The game also introduces mineral smelting, which allows the creation of a number of alloys by collecting minerals in certain sequences. The introduction of a number of optional puzzles, solvable via the use of bombs, is also new to Super Motherload.

== Plot ==
Super Motherload features a horror science-fiction storyline, in which players play as the pilots of digging machines sent to Mars to harvest precious resources. As players descend, they begin to learn about "the secrets of Mars and the strange occurrences happening throughout the various Solarus bases".

== Reception ==
Reception

Aggregate scores
| Aggregator | Score |
|---|---|
| GameRankings | 68.17% |
| Metacritic | 65/100 |

Review scores
| Publication | Score |
|---|---|
| GameSpot | 7/10 |
| IGN | 6/10 |

Penny Arcade included the game as the subject of a comic strip and blog post.

The PS4 version of Super Motherload has generally received mixed reception. Metacritic rates it at 65/100, indicating "mixed or average" reviews. Destructoid gave the game an 8 out of 10. They thought the game was exciting with increasing complexity, although repetitive, citing the gameplay as instilling a "feeling of zen". IGN was less impressed, citing "simple and repetitious" gameplay. However, they did say the premise was "one that could prove to be addictive." The game received a PlayStation Blog Editors' choice award in 2013.

== See also ==
- Defend Your Castle
- XGen Studios
