= Icarian =

Icarian can refer to:

- The Icarians, a utopian movement
- Icarian: Kindred Spirits, a video game
- Icarians, fictional beings in the first game of Grandia series
- People and things from Icaria, a Greek island
