= Turnover =

Turnover or turn over may refer to:

== Arts, entertainment, and media ==
- Turn Over, a 1988 live album by Japanese band Show-Ya
- Turnover (band), an American rock band
- "Turnover", a song on Fugazi's 1990 album Repeater
- Turnover, a Japanese manga and animated short animated by Studio 4°C
- "Turnover" (Hit the Floor), an episode of Hit the Floor
- "Turn Over", a 2021 EP Album by South Korean boy band SF9

== Business ==
- Turnover (employment), relative rate at which an employer gains and loses staff
- Asset turnover or asset turns, a financial ratio that measures the efficiency of a company's use of its assets in generating sales revenue
- Customer attrition, the rate at which a business loses customers, sometimes called the churn
- Inventory turnover or inventory turns, a measure of the number of times inventory is sold or used in a time period
- Sales turnover or revenue, income a business has from sales
- Turnover tax, an indirect tax similar to a sales tax or a VAT

== Science ==
- Cell turnover, the replacement of old cells with newly generated ones
- Lake turnover, when the waters in a lake ecosystem begin to mix again to create a uniform temperature
- Population turnover, measure of gross moves in relation to the size of a population
- Substance turnover, or biogeochemical cycle, a pathway by which a chemical substance moves
- Turnover number, a measure related to chemical conversions
- Turnover time, flushing time, the ratio of mass to flux

== Sports ==
- Turnover (basketball), when a player loses possession of the ball resulting from a steal, going out of bounds, committing a violation, or committing an offensive foul
- Turnover (gridiron football), in American and Canadian football when the offense loses possession of the football because of a fumble, interception, or on downs
- Turnover (rugby league), when a team loses possession or at the end of a team's six tackles
- Turnover (rugby union), when a team loses possession in a ruck or a maul

== Other uses ==
- Turnover (food), a type of pastry made by placing a filling on a piece of dough, folding the dough over, and sealing it
- Turnover bridge, a type of bridge
- Turnover pistol, a type of gun

== See also ==
- Over (disambiguation)
- Overturn
- TO (disambiguation)
- Turn (disambiguation)
