= Shadowplay =

Shadow play refers to shadow puppetry or shadow theatre.

Shadowplay, Shadow Play or The Shadow Play may refer to:

== Literature ==
- Shadowplay (novel), a 2007 novel by Tad Williams
- Shadowplay, a 1990 novel by Jo Clayton
- Shadowplay, a 1993 novel by Nigel Findley
- Shadowplay, a 2005 graphic novel series by Ashley Wood, Ben Templesmith, Christina Z
- Shadowplay, a 2010 novel by Karen Campbell
- Shadowplay, a 2014 novel by Laura Lam
- Shadowplay, a 2019 novel by Joseph O'Connor
- Shadow Play (play), a 1935 play by Noël Coward
- Shadow Play, a 1993 novel by Charles Baxter
- Shadow Play, a 2017 novel by Mansoura Ez-Eldin
- "Shadow Play" (Look and Read) (2004), the last story of Look and Read

== Film ==
- Shadow Play (film), a 1986 TV movie
- The Shadow Play (1992 film), a Turkish film directed by Yavuz Turgul
- The Shadow Play (2018 film), Chinese film directed by Lou Ye
- Shadowplay (2022 film), a 2022 Czech film directed by Peter Bebjak

== Television ==
- "Shadow Play", an episode of Doctor Who Confidential that accompanies "Silence in the Library"
- "Shadow Play" (Stargate SG-1), an episode of the television series Stargate SG-1
- "Shadow Play" (The Twilight Zone, 1959), an episode of The Twilight Zone starring Dennis Weaver
- "Shadow Play" (The Twilight Zone, 1985), an episode of The Twilight Zone and a remake of the 1961 episode
- Shadowplay (TV series), also released as The Defeated (2020), a TV series about the aftermath of World War II
- "Shadowplay" (Star Trek: Deep Space Nine), an episode of Star Trek: Deep Space Nine
- "Shadow Play", a collective name for the twenty fifth and twenty six episodes of the seventh season of My Little Pony: Friendship is Magic.

== Other uses ==
- Shadow Play (horse), world record-holding Standardbred racehorse
- Nvidia Shadowplay, hardware accelerated screen recording by Nvidia
- ShadowPlay, the first WiiWare game to use Wii MotionPlus
- "Shadowplay" (song), a song originally by Joy Division
- "Shadow Play", a song by Rory Gallagher from the album Photo-Finish
- "Shadow Play", a rock band from Milton Keynes, UK

== See also ==
- Shadowplayers, title of both a 2006 documentary film and a 2010 book by James Nice
- Shadow Plays, an album by Craig Taborn
