= X-gene =

X-gene may refer to:

- The mutant factor in Marvel Comics
- X-Gene Platform, an ARM-based computer microarchitecture by Applied Micro Circuits Corporation

== See also ==
- Generation X or Gen X
- XGen Studios, a Canadian video game development studio
