= Lists of Virtual Console games =

Each 'region' has different Virtual Console titles available for download to the Wii, Nintendo 3DS, and Wii U depending on licensing and other factors.

== Systems ==
- List of Virtual Console games for Wii
- List of Virtual Console games for Nintendo 3DS
- List of Virtual Console games for Wii U

== See also ==
- Nintendo Classics
- List of Wii games
- List of WiiWare games
- Wii Shop Channel
- WiiWare
- List of DSiWare games and applications
