= Little Tournament Over Yonder =

2009 video game

- Developer: Gevo Entertainment
- Publisher: Gevo Entertainment
- Platform: Wii (WiiWare)
- Release: EU: 16 October 2009; NA: 23 November 2009
- Genres: Turn-based strategy, Fighting
- Modes: Single-player, Multiplayer

Little Tournament Over Yonder is a video game developed by Singaporean studio Gevo Entertainment for WiiWare. The gameplay is a blend of turn-based strategy and real-time fighting action. The game was released in Europe on 16 October 2009, and in the United States on 23 November 2009. The game is priced at 800 Wii Points.

== Gameplay ==
Little Tournament Over Yonder consists of two game modes: Tournament and Versus.

In Tournament mode, the main objective is to win a tournament nobody has ever won before. After selecting one of the four factions, you must win nine rounds, each of which consists of three matches (one against each other faction). Each of the factions starts with different units; for example, one has a huge number of Knights, while another has an army of Archers.

During gameplay, players will switch between a "Strategy Mode" and a "Battle Mode".

In "Strategy Mode", players will move their units around a large grid. During this mode, you have a 60-minute time limit, and once that is up, the team with the most remaining units wins. If both teams have the same number left, it is a tie, except in the single-player mode, where you will be the loser.

When your units are next to the enemy's, they can engage in battle, and you will enter "Battle Mode," which is a real-time battle between the two units in question. You are given one minute to defeat the opponent; should you fail to do this within the time limit, the damage dealt will remain, so you can finish the enemy off later. All units have two attacks during these battles: a primary attack, which is relatively weak but can be reused quickly, and a secondary attack, which deals quite a bit more damage but has a long recharge time.

Versus Mode is similar to Tournament Mode. Two players pick one of the teams created in Tournament Mode and battle against each other.

== See also ==
- List of WiiWare games
