= Penguins & Friends: Hey! That's My Fish! =

2009 video game

- Developer(s): Gammick Entertainment
- Publisher(s): Gammick Entertainment
- Platform(s): Wii (WiiWare)
- Release: NA: May 4, 2009; EU: May 22, 2009
- Mode(s): Single-player, Multiplayer

Penguins & Friends: Hey! That's My Fish! was a WiiWare video game based on the board game "Hey! That's My Fish!". It was developed by the Spanish developer Gammick Entertainment and has been delisted from the WiiWare service on March 30, 2012.

The game involves players taking turns to move across a field of hexagons as they collect as much fish as they can.
