= Family & Friends Party =

2009 video game

- Developer(s): Gammick Entertainment
- Publisher(s): Gammick Entertainment
- Platform(s): Wii (WiiWare)
- Release: NA: March 2, 2009; PAL: April 10, 2009
- Genre(s): Various
- Mode(s): Single-player, Multiplayer

Family & Friends Party is a video game developed by Spanish studio Gammick Entertainment for WiiWare. It was released in North America on March 2, 2009 and in the PAL regions on April 10, 2009.

== Overview ==
Family & Friends Party is a minigame compilation for multiple players, with individuals or teams competing to complete all six games within a certain number of turns. The six minigames include variations and clones of hangman, charades, Simon and Pictionary.

== Reception ==
IGN gave it 5.9/10, believing that players will only get the most enjoyment out of it with many players gathered together. WiiWare World echoed these sentiments and also felt that while it featured decent production values, it suffered from unbalanced gameplay and a steep asking price. They gave it 5/10.
