= Snail Mail (video game) =

2004 video game

- Windows cover art
- Publisher: Sandlot Games
- Platforms: Windows, Wii, OS X, iOS, Android
- Release: December 3, 2004
- Genre: Racing
- Mode: Multiplayer

Snail Mail is a racing video game released by Sandlot Games and developed by Alpha72 Games for Microsoft Windows on December 3, 2004. Versions for Wii, through the WiiWare service, and iOS were released in 2011. The player controls a snail named Turbo, with a jetpack strapped to its back, avoiding various enemies and obstacles.

== Gameplay ==
The game features the main protagonist, a snail, whose task is to deliver mail throughout various worlds and levels. Set in space, the game features cel shaded graphics. Snail Mail offers three different modes of play; postal mode, time trial mode and challenge mode. The snail (named "Turbo", pictured in the cover art) has to navigate throughout the levels whilst avoiding various enemies and obstacles, using a jetpack strapped onto his back. In multiplayer, other players use different colored snails. The levels are filled with powerups, as well as packages that can be collected. There are 50 levels in the game.

== Reception ==
The game received mixed reviews from critics. A review by Nintendo-video game review site Nintendo Life praised the art style and the colorful visuals. The same review, however, mentioned awkward game controls which affected gameplay. The review also found the levels to be too similar and repetitive to make the game an enjoyable one. The review noted that the graphics occasionally made the game difficult to play.

TouchArcade gave the iOS version mostly positive feedback, saying that "everything about the game was fun". IGN also reviewed the iOS version of the game, and gave it in an 8/10.
