= ColorZ =

2009 video game

- Developer: Exkee
- Publisher: Exkee
- Platform: Wii
- Release: EU: July 24, 2009; NA: September 7, 2009; JP: November 30, 2010
- Genres: Action, Puzzle
- Modes: Single-player, Multiplayer

ColorZ is an action/puzzle video game for WiiWare by Exkee.

== Gameplay ==
The game is set in a world polluted by microbes of different colors, which the player must clean up by absorbing them into a UFO. Players control up to 3 UFOs colored red, green and blue that individually can only absorb microbes of their own color. However, by fusing together their UFOs, players can absorb other colors based on additive color mixing. For example, to absorb yellow microbes the red and green UFOs must fuse, while a fusion of all three UFOs will allow the player to absorb white microbes. Players must also avoid absorbing the wrong colored microbe with their UFOs. The game also features a co-operative mode for up to three players that sees each player controlling an individual UFO.

The game is controlled with the Wii Remote and Nunchuk in single player, though only the Wii Remote is required in multiplayer.

== Development and release ==
The color matching and absorbing aspects of the game were inspired by the shoot 'em up Ikaruga.

It was released in Europe on July 24, 2009, and in North America on September 7, 2009, followed by the Japan release on November 30, 2010.

== Reception ==
Reception

Aggregate scores
Aggregator	Score
GameRankings	59.22%
Metacritic	59/100

Review scores
Publication	Score
Edge	7/10
GamePro	2.5/5
Hardcore Gamer	2.5/5
IGN	5.5/10
Jeuxvideo.com	12/20
Nintendo Life	5/10
Nintendo World Report	5/10
El Español	7/10
Gamereactor	7/10
