= Mart Racer =

2009 video game

- Developer: Joju Games
- Publisher: Joju Games
- Platform: WiiWare
- Release: NA: September 14, 2009
- Genre: Racing
- Modes: Single-player, multiplayer

Mart Racer is a racing game for WiiWare developed by American studio Joju Games, released in North America on September 14, 2009. It supports up to 4 players offline and online through the Nintendo Wi-Fi Connection.

== Gameplay ==
Set in a supermarket, the game sees players pushing around shopping carts as they complete a list of 6 items they must collect and bring back to the checkout before their opponents can. Players always compete against 3 other human or AI opponents, and as items only respawn after a 1-minute wait, players are encouraged to steal items from each other, exploiting 6 different power-ups for offense or defense.

Mart Racer features twelve different supermarkets to race in, with new stages unlocked by winning. The game is controlled by players gripping the Wii Remote like the bar on a shopping cart, tilting it forward and back to accelerate and brake, and twisting it to steer. The Classic Controller is also supported.

== Reception ==
Wiiloveit.com gave the game an 18/30, stating that the execution "leaves much to be desired", making it "extremely difficult to justify the 800-point price tag". It was also commented that the online mode isn't much of a saving grace since it is almost impossible to get a match going.
