= 3D Pixel Racing =

2011 video game

- Box art
- Developer: Vidia
- Publishers: Microforum Games (WiiWare); Vidia (iOS)
- Platforms: WiiWare, iOS
- Release: WiiWare: NA: July 14, 2011; EU: September 8, 2011; iOS; October 18, 2011
- Genre: Racing
- Modes: Single-player, multiplayer

3D Pixel Racing is an arcade-style racing game developed by Vidia and released in 2011. The game was released as a downloadable game on WiiWare and in the App Store for iOS devices. 3D Pixel Racing heavily capitalizes on its graphical uniqueness. Unlike most 3D games, every object in 3D Pixel Racing is made of multi-colored voxels that are reminiscent of old 8-bit games from the 1970s and 80's.

== Gameplay ==
The gameplay in 3D Pixel Racer is similar to other basic driving games. Players choose a driver, car, and gameplay mode, and compete in a series of events in that mode to unlock new cars, tracks, and drivers. Every track in the game has several checkpoints at which players' total race times are logged, so players can replay tracks to get the best time. The game controls in the Wii version are nearly the same as those in Mario Kart Wii; the Wii Remote is held in the sideways position and used to simulate a steering wheel. The iOS version of the game uses the iPhone's built-in accelerometer as a steering wheel, and two buttons on the touchscreen to control the car's gas and brake.

=== Gameplay modes ===
There are five different gameplay modes in 3D Pixel Racing: Single Race, Championship, Time Trial, Capture the Flag, and Hot Pursuit. Every gameplay mode supports both single-player and multiplayer games with up to four players.

==== Single Race ====
Players choose a driver, track, and vehicle from the ones they have unlocked, and compete against seven computer-controlled drivers or other players in a three-lap circuit race. Single race is the only mode in the game that does not count towards unlocking items or completing the game.

==== Championship ====
Players choose a vehicle and compete against seven other drivers in a series of eight races called a cup. At the end of every race in the series, each driver is awarded a set number of points based on their finishing position. The driver with the most points at the end of the last race wins the cup. Winning cups in Championship mode is the easiest way to unlock new items and is mandatory for completing the game.

==== Time Trial ====
Players race against the clock around a series of tracks in Time Trial mode. A time trial event is lost if the time on the clock expires before the set number of laps has been completed. In multiplayer time trials, all the players race on the same track, but are clocked and scored separately.

==== Capture the Flag ====
Capture the Flag is similar to a circuit race with the addition of a checkered flag on the ground just past the starting line. The flag is picked up by the first car to touch it and is carried by that car until it is hit by another vehicle. When the car carrying the flag gets hit, possession of the flag changes to the offensive car. Gameplay continues in this fashion for the remainder of the three-lap race. The race is won by the player who possesses the flag at the end of the third lap.

==== Hot Pursuit ====
Players are pursued by a police car around any one of the race courses while being timed. The event is lost if the player is caught by the police car or fails to outrun the police car before the clock runs out. In multiplayer, one player drives the police car, and the other players must outrun it.

== Reception ==
Reception

Aggregate score
Aggregator	Score
Metacritic	(iOS) 70/100 (Wii) 45/100

Review scores
Publication	Score
GamesMaster	(Wii) 28%
IGN	(Wii) 6/10
NGamer	(Wii) 40%
Nintendo Life	(Wii) 4/10
Official Nintendo Magazine	(Wii) 48%
TouchArcade	(iOS) 3.5/5

The iOS version received "average" reviews, while the Wii version received "generally unfavorable reviews", according to the review aggregation website Metacritic.
