= Silver Star Reversi =

2008 video game

- Developer(s): Agetec
- Publisher(s): Agetec: JP: Electronic Arts
- Platform(s): Wii (WiiWare)
- Release: JP: September 2, 2008; NA: June 29, 2009
- Genre(s): Traditional game
- Mode(s): Single-player, Multiplayer

Silver Star Reversi is a reversi video game for WiiWare. It was released in Japan on September 2, 2008 and in North America on June 29, 2009.
