= The Tales of Bearsworth Manor =

2010 video game

- Developer: Square Enix
- Publisher: Square Enix
- Artist: Akira Oguro
- Platform: WiiWare
- Release: JP: June 8, 2010; NA: June 21, 2010; EU: June 25, 2010
- Genre: Puzzle
- Modes: Single-player, multiplayer

The Tales of Bearsworth Manor, or Kumanage in Japanese, is a 2010 video game developed and published by Square Enix and released for the Wii's WiiWare service. The game was released in two parts: Tales of Bearsworth Manor: Puzzling Pages, and Tales of Bearsworth Manor: Chaotic Conflicts. Both games are set in a picture book held by a ghost in the haunted Bearsworth Manor, and have the player use the Wiimote controller to toss paper bears onto the book's 3D landscape. Chaotic Conflicts is a tower defense game, where the paper bears defend blue gems from enemy BadBears, while Puzzling Pages is a puzzle game where the bears collect red candies. Both game versions received poor reviews; critics felt that the games were amusing and creative, but found the controls terrible.

== Gameplay ==
Gameplay from Chaotic Conflicts, with two gems being defended

In Puzzling Pages, players use the Wii Remote to throw paper bears into the landscape of a picture book on the screen to manipulate the on screen environment in order to gather all the red candies. There are no enemies to combat in this version, only puzzles to solve. Bears pick up red candies when they end up near them, and the level ends when all candies are picked up. Some levels feature the ability to throw items, such as bombs, in addition to the bears. Players must blow up boxes with bombs, land their bears on see-saws, and activate switches in order to collect the red candies. "Puzzling Pages" features 30 levels. At the end of each level, the player is awarded a medal depending on how many bears they still have left unused.

In Chaotic Conflicts, players use the Wiimote to throw paper bears into a picture book landscape, similar to the other game. The goal is to protect blue gems in a tower defense-style game. The bears act as soldiers to fight off waves of enemies, known as BadBears, from reaching the blue gems, which hang over spots in the landscape. Each gem can take a certain number of strikes from enemies before breaking, and losing any of the gems ends the level. Some levels feature ledges and other surfaces that the player must aim their bears towards. Levels can also include special items, which are picked up by bears and then thrown by the player to have various effects like extra damage on certain types of BadBears. There are also special units which can be picked up, such as penguins that freeze enemies and jack o' lanterns that blow them up.

In addition to the base game, downloadable content is available for sale for both games. Extra levels and character designs are available, with the price of all the DLC reaching around double the price of the base games, upon release.

== Plot ==
Both games are set in a crumbling, haunted mansion, named Bearsworth Manor. The eponymous tales are two books in the manor; one held by the young girl ghost Pina, and one by the you boy ghost Kina. Pina's picture book comes to life in Puzzling Pages, transforming into a 3D landscape, and the player solves the puzzles inside by sending paper bears into the book, where they collect candies. In Chaotic Conflicts, players send paper bears into Kina's book, which has also transformed into a 3D landscape, to defend their blue gems from Kina.

== Reception ==
Reception

Aggregate score
Aggregator	Score
Metacritic	58 / 100 (PP); 54 / 100 (CC)

Review scores
Publication	Score
Edge	4 / 10
IGN	5.5 / 10
NGamer	3 / 5 (PP), 2 / 5 (CC)
Nintendo Life	8 / 10 (PP), 8 / 10 (CC)

IGN reviewed both games and gave them a 5.5, or "Mediocre", calling the graphical style "sensational", but panning both games imprecise controls, short game play time, and excessive price for the games and their downloadable content. Nintendo Life was complimentary of Puzzling Pages, calling it a "creative storybook adventure" wrapped around a simple game and awarding it 8 of 10, while Edge magazine gave it a 4, saying that "its concept feels almost thrown together". Nintendo Life also gave Chaotic Chronicles an 8 of 10, praising the "silly theme and intense gameplay mechanics", but Edge gave it a 3, claiming that the poor controls left the game almost unplayable. Nintendo Gamer reviewed Puzzling Pages higher than Chaotic Conflicts; they felt that the game format suited the puzzle genre more than the tower defense genre, but that both games were marred by poor controls.
