= Magnetis =

2009 video game

- Developer: Yullaby
- Publisher: Yullaby
- Platforms: Wii (WiiWare), Steam
- Release: NA: December 7, 2009; EU: September 18, 2009
- Genre: Puzzle
- Modes: Single-player, multiplayer

Magnetis is a WiiWare and PC video game developed by Yullaby, and was released in 2009. The game is notably Yullaby's first independent project, after previously being commissioned to develop video games by third parties.

== Gameplay ==
Magnetis is set in a fantasy industrial environment where various magnets and metallic blocks will stack up. The combination of the magnets, gathered according to their polarity, aligned or not with metallic blocks, allow the player to make a complete line of elements to disappear. It is also possible to get rid of several lines in a row, such as combos.

Magnetis was developed for the WiiWare and Steam platforms using the GameStart engine, now known as Harfang 3D.

== Interview with developers ==
NintendoLife Interviews: Magnetis - Yullaby

== Reception ==
Despite its poor sales, Magnetis was generally met with good reviews.

IGN UK gave the game a 7.5 (out of 10), praising its "slick presentation" and "deep mechanics", but said that the "lack of any online functionality was disappointing".

Nintendo Life also gave it a similar score of 7 stars (out of 10), saying that "the music is possibly amongst the best you'll hear on WiiWare", but said there was a lack of variety in the gameplay.

Wiiloveit.com assigned the game a 25/30 with a "Very Good" rating. They felt it was a "captivating" and "unique take on the falling block concept". Praise was also given to the game for "work[ing] so well in a group setting", its "amazing musical soundtrack" and for its "sense of quality".
