= Helix (video game) =

2008 video game

- Developer: Ghostfire Games
- Publisher: Ghostfire Games
- Platform: Wii
- Release: NA: August 25, 2008; EU: September 26, 2008
- Genre: Rhythm
- Modes: Single-player, multiplayer

Helix is a 2008 rhythm video game developed and published by American studio Ghostfire Games for the Wii. It was released on the WiiWare service as the studio's debut game. The objective of the game is to accurately copy gestures with the Wii Remote to the beat of the music. The game encourages players to use two Wii Remotes to play, and features 26 music tracks from independent musicians.

== Gameplay ==
The player is required to copy the arm motions of a robot that dances on screen using their Wii Remotes. The player is first shown the motion, and then must perform it afterward, similar to the game simon says. A "Rhythm Track" scrolls across the top of the screen, indicating to the player when it is time for to do the motion.

When the robot does a move, a "Move Bar" appears on the Rhythm Track. The Move Bar starts traveling left on the Rhythm Track after it appears. The player must then time their motion so that it is halfway completed by the time the center of the Move Bar passes by the halfway mark of the Rhythm Track. Once completing the motion, if the Move Bar turns green, the player has performed the gesture correctly, if it turns red, the move was performed incorrectly. In addition, like other music games, Helix also features a gauge that fills up with every successful move, and depletes with every failed move.

== Development ==
Helix was developed at Ghostfire Games, a video game developer located at Austin, Texas. The game was designed with as "a video game that happens to burn calories as a side benefit". In order to keep the game under the 40mb size limit imposed by Nintendo, the developers used various technologies such as music visualization instead of custom animation, and used audio compression to fit the 26 songs into the game. Ghostfire Games would later develop Rage of the Gladiator before shutting down.

== Reception ==
Helix received an 8.0 out of 10 from WiiWare World, saying "as it is, Helix is a refreshing entry into the rhythm action genre and, without a doubt, one of the more worthwhile additions to WiiWare. If you weren't a fan of such titles before then we don't expect you to be won over by it, but if you enjoy a fun game that tries something different (and succeeds) then we can heartily recommend Helix to you. It is definitely worth the asking price."

GameFocus were also positive, scoring Helix an 85/100, the reviewer noting "I was blown away by the unique gameplay and simple concept behind the game, which makes this one of the best Wii and downloadable games this year. If you enjoy rhythm games this one will be one of your favorites."

In contrast, IGN gave the game 4.3/10, citing "shallow" motion controls and "blah" visuals, and showing little fondness for the game's techno soundtrack.

GamingTarget did two reviews of the title due to opposing views by their writers. One reviewer found fault with "the lack of precise movement, uneven challenge, and uninspired music selection" of the game, while the other felt that Ghostfire made "a fun, but bare-bones package" and called for a more fleshed-out edition.
