= Fish'em All =

2009 video game

- Developer(s): Abylight
- Publisher(s): Abylight
- Platform(s): Wii (WiiWare)
- Release: PAL: May 29, 2009; NA: June 8, 2009
- Genre(s): Action
- Mode(s): Single-player, multiplayer

Fish'em All is a fishing video game for WiiWare by Spanish studio Abylight. It was released in Europe on May 29, 2009, and in North America on June 8, 2009 for 800 Wii Points.

== Gameplay ==
Players control one of two elderly fishermen named Jack and Walter. The game involves the player running along the side of a pond, trying to catch fish that leap out of the water using a net by swinging the Wii Remote. Players gain more points by catching fish of certain colors, and must also avoid obstacles that can get in their way.

The game features an arcade mode, an objective-based challenge mode, and a mode called "Fishtris" which involves players trying to catch three of the same colored fish in a row in order to fill up a gauge. A second player can also compete in the arcade and Fishtris modes.

== Reception ==
Nintendo Life called the game "a mixed bag", finding the game enjoyable but let down by annoying controls, which ultimately hurt the playability of the challenge mode which requires precise actions on the part of the player. IGN called it "a winner in aesthetics" with a fun and hilarious concept, but also felt the controls lacked precision, leading to frustration for the player.

In response Abylight have released a video that offers advice to players on how to handle the game's controls. IGN considered this an admission from the developer that the control scheme has serious issues.
