= Gnomz =

2011 platforming video game

- Developer: QubicGames
- Publisher: QubicGames
- Platform: WiiWare
- Release: WW: November 3, 2011
- Genres: Platform game, fighting game
- Modes: Single-player, multiplayer

Gnomz is a single-screen platform fighting video game developed and published by Polish studio QubicGames. It was released for the WiiWare on November 3, 2011 to mixed reviews from video game journalists. Critics praised its fun and chaotic gameplay, but found the amount of content too little for a ten-dollar WiiWare game. Writers also compared the gameplay to that of Super Mario War.

== Development and gameplay ==
Gnomz is a tribute to Poland, a country that is the location of QubicGames and is well known for making garden gnomes. Michael Dys of QubicGames said that the developers originally planned players to be able to do attacks like shooting socks and throwing rocks to kill enemies. However, they then decided to go for a more simple gameplay style and have the players jumping on other characters to kill them instead, reasoning, "In the end it's the simplicity that's most entertaining and challenging. Can you imagine Bomberman with shotguns? I'm sorry but we can't". Numerous reviewers compared the gameplay of Gnomz to that of Super Mario War, one critic from Nintendo Life describing it as an extended WarioWare minigame due to its "wacky" feel.

== Release and reception ==
Reception

Aggregate scores
Aggregator	Score
GameRankings	60%
Metacritic	59/100

Review scores
Publication	Score
IGN	6/10
Nintendo Life	6/10
GamesMaster	60/100
Nintendojo	C

Gnomz was released worldwide for the WiiWare on November 3, 2011. It was also originally planned to be made and distributed for the Nintendo DSi, but due to the small screen size that was not big enough to handle many gnomes, this plan was dropped. Gnomz garnered mixed reviews from video game journalists upon its release. Critics praised its chaotic and fun gameplay, but felt its price was too high given the little amount of content it had to offer. However, QubicGames worker Michał Dys said the game was worth 1000 points, saying that "This is the kind of game you can't complete or get bored of."

Jacob Crites of Nintendo Life praised the gameplay as "beautiful chaos". He called Gnomz an enjoyable family game with easy-to-adapt-to controls and colorful visuals. However, he wrote that the game should have sold for 800 points instead of 1000, and also found it to be "unoriginal". While considering Gnomz fun, especially in multiplayer, Nintendojo's Kevin Knezevic felt the game's amount of content was not enough to justify it being a ten-dollar WiiWare title, given that there were other titles in the library with much more to do like Bomberman Blast that were sold at the same price. GamesMaster said the game should have sold for 500 points, and described its art as "pretty lifeless".

IGN's Lucas M. Thomas only mildly recommended Gnomz due to its small amount of content for a ten-dollar product, and wrote that the control felt "like it's missing something, as matches against opponents (either your friends or A.I.-controlled) always seem to descend into chaos and force multiple deaths upon you before you respawn in a favorable enough position to be able to reasonably retaliate." He also wrote that Gnomz had much less charm than the title it was supposedly inspired by, Super Mario War: "Mario defeating enemies by stomping on their heads has always been a key part of his character – it makes a lot less sense to see a bunch of garden gnomes trying to do the same thing."
