= Silver Star Chess =

2008 video game

- Developer: Agetec
- Publishers: Agetec; Electronic Arts (Japan)
- Platform: Wii (WiiWare)
- Release: NA: May 18, 2009; JP: August 5, 2008
- Genre: Traditional game
- Modes: Single-player, Multiplayer

Silver Star Chess is a chess video game for WiiWare. It costs 500 Nintendo Points to download.

== Reception ==
The game has been criticized for its poor artificial intelligence and lack of online multiplayer.
