= MadStone =

2008 video game

- Developer: Riverman Media
- Platform: Wii (WiiWare)
- Release: NA: October 6, 2008
- Genre: Puzzle
- Modes: Single-player, multiplayer

MadStone is a puzzle video game for WiiWare developed by American studio Riverman Media. It was released in North America on October 6, 2008.

== Plot ==
Once every 999 years, the sprits of the earth start to grow restless and destructive, and so the player has to harness the power of the land and calm the spirits to restore the tranquility of the planet.

== Gameplay ==
MadStone is a puzzle game in which players must break apart blocks to help special gems (called MadStones) drop down to a pool at the bottom of the screen through their own weight and gravity. Players use the D-pad on the Wii Remote to move an onscreen cursor to select which blocks to break, and can also cause an earthquake that breaks up random blocks by shaking the Wii Remote. The game also features a versus mode against the computer or a second player in addition to the single player arcade mode.

In order to promote the game Riverman Media held The Savant Challenge, a competition which rewards the top 20 players who are able to beat the game on its highest difficulty. As of February 2009 the competition is still in progress.

== Reception ==
IGN called the gameplay "shallow" and "way, way too mindless", and criticized the lack of modes and absence of pointer control, giving MadStone a 4/10. In contrast, WiiWare World gave it a 7/10, calling the graphics "eye catching", and that the gameplay puts a "unique twist on the genre", though they admitted it was also "somewhat simplistic".
