= Defend Your Castle =

- Main menu for the Wii version of Defend Your Castle
- Developer: XGen Studios
- Publisher: XGen Studios
- Platforms: Browser, Windows, Wii, iOS, Android, Nintendo Switch
- Release: Wii: NA: May 12, 2008; EU: August 1, 2008; iOS: WW: April 20, 2009; Windows: WW: October 18, 2017; Nintendo Switch: WW: April 25, 2019
- Genre: Arcade
- Modes: Single player, multiplayer

Defend Your Castle is a series of video games developed by XGen Studios.

The original version of Defend Your Castle is a Macromedia Flash-based browser game. It requires the player to kill all enemy units before they destroy the player's castle. There are various ways of accomplishing this, such as picking up enemies and throwing them into the air or attacking them with an array of weapons, which are purchased with points gained from the previous level. Players may also use points to repair or fortify their castle.

== Gameplay ==
Enemy units can be "converted" to your team, and can be trained as different unit types to help defend the castle.

=== Archers ===
Archery may be purchased for 8,000 points. Archers shoot arrows from the bottom-left tower of the castle, instantly eliminating any foe, although they can miss (these arrows can also kill the giant stick figure that is unable to be thrown). The more archers one has in their castle, the more frequently they will shoot arrows.

=== Mana Pool ===
The Mana Pool may be purchased for 40,000 points; it allows the user to train wizards, who allow spells to be cast by selecting the desired spell, then selecting the enemy on whom one wishes to inflict the spell. The more wizards one has, the more spells can be cast. (The first spell is gained with 1 wizard, the second with 35, and the third with 100) The first spell is an instant kill spell, instantly killing an enemy. The second spell is an explosion that inflicts massive damage to all units within range. The third spell allows the player to instantly convert an enemy unit to their side.

=== Work Shop ===
The Work Shop may be purchased for 25,000 points. When the castle is damaged, craftsmen rebuild, effectively restoring health; they are unable to attack the invading enemy units, however. The more craftsmen there are trained, the faster health will regenerate.

=== Demolition Lab ===
The Demolition Lab may be purchased for 15,000 points. Once purchased, the player can click on a convert at the top-right corner of the game and send out dynamite strapped converts. To detonate them, the player can simply click on them, and the resulting explosion will kill any enemy units near the bomber. This is a one-time use attack, however, and bombers that leave the field do not return to the castle.

== Console version ==
The console version of the game was first released on the Wii as WiiWare costing 500 Wii Points which it takes up 121 blocks, it was later released on iOS, Android, Steam, and then the Nintendo Switch.

This version of Defend Your Castle boasts a new graphic style, prominently featuring elements taking the form of household objects, such as bottle caps, bread ties, and wooden ice cream sticks for sprites, with backgrounds made out of construction paper with clouds of tissue paper. Because of rating reasons, the Wii version does not contain the use of blood; the stickmen attackers just collapse instead of splatter, although their heads remain on screen before fading, something which did not happen in the original version.

The game supports simultaneous 4-player co-operative multiplayer only in the Wii version.

== Reception ==
Reception

Aggregate scores
Aggregator	Score
GameRankings	67.05%
Metacritic	65/100

Review scores
Publication	Score
1Up.com	B−
GameSpot	6/10
IGN	7.9/10

The initial flash version of the game was well received and prompted XGen to release a prequel titled Pillage the Village, with similar gameplay.

A version of the game for the Nintendo's WiiWare service was released on May 12, 2008, in North America and on August 1, 2008, in Europe and Australia. At the 2009 Game Developers Conference, XGen Studios announced that the game would soon be released for the Apple iOS.

On Metacritic the WiiWare release of Defend Your Castle has a score of 65/100 based on reviews from 17 critics, indicating "mixed or average reviews".

IGN gave the game 7.9 out of 10. They thought the game was fun and frantic, and cited it as a game with "seemingly shallow pick-up-and-play experiences [but] with hidden depth". They were not impressed with the graphics, noting in their review that they were designed to be "intentionally bad". 1UP.com gave the game a B− and found appeal in the "piecemeal aesthetic" as well as the simple gameplay, but felt that the game starts off very slow-paced.

GameSpot was less impressed, citing "super shallow" gameplay and also noting the possibility of the player suffering repetitive stress injuries after long periods of play. However, they did enjoy the "goofy visual aesthetic" and the potential for a fun and frantic multiplayer experience, and gave it a 6 out of 10.

== See also ==
- List of WiiWare games
