= 5 Spots Party =

2009 video game

- Developer: Cosmonaut Games
- Publisher: Cosmonaut Games
- Platform: WiiWare
- Release: EU: July 10, 2009; NA: July 20, 2009
- Genre: Puzzle
- Modes: Single-player, multiplayer

5 Spots Party is a party video game for WiiWare by Spanish studio Cosmonaut Games. It is a spin-off of the casual PC games 5 Spots and 5 Spots II by KatGames. It was released in Europe on July 10, 2009 and in North America on July 20, 2009.

== Gameplay ==
Like its predecessors, 5 Spots Party is a video game version of spot the difference. Players are given 2 near-identical pictures and must uncover differences between the two images under a time limit by using the pointer of the Wii Remote. The player controls 2 cursors: one for precision zooming in, and the other for selecting part of an image. The game supports up to 4 players in Party Mode, where the aim of the game is to spot the most differences amongst players, a "Find The Monkey" mode, which involves finding a picture of a monkey hidden in a photo. The monkeys vary in art style and appearance. Another "Super Fun Classic", which entails finding 5 differences in similar looking pictures within a specific amount of time. After the mode ends, the player's score is imputed on a scoreboard, which is accessible from the main menu. The final game mode, "Leisure", has no time limit and has the player attempting to progress through 5 photos as quick as possible. The game claims to feature 333 pictures, with a possible ten mistakes in each picture.

== Reception ==
Reception

Aggregate score
Aggregator	Score
Metacritic	56/100

Review scores
Publication	Score
IGN	5/10
Nintendo Life	6/10

5 Spots Party received mixed reviews from critics upon release. On the review aggregation website Metacritic, the game holds a score of 56/100 based on 4 reviews, indicating "mixed or average reviews".

Writing for Nintendo Life, Sean Aaron praised the game altogether, saying "The concept behind 5 Spots Party doesn't sound terribly compelling, but by including a clever control mechanism, a timer and some rather challenging photos Cosmonaut Games have managed to make a decent budget WiiWare title [...]", but criticized the party mode, calling it "Lacklustre", and found the sound effects and music "forgettable bordering on annoying". Aaron also doubted the game's claims of having 333 images, saying "you may wonder if there's a bit of creative math being used in coming up with that photo count." Writing For IGN, Lucas M. Thomas criticized the differences in the images, saying "Many of the visual differences are incredibly subtle, too, adding frustration into the mix -- you're given a handful of wild cards that you can trigger to have the game freely show you one of the spots you're missing, and using that option will often make you feel a bit cheated when you see there's barely two pixels' difference between what's on the left and what's on the right.". Overall, he felt that "[The game is the] kind of activity [...] best kept in magazines and coloring books for kids".
