= Yullaby =

French video game developer

- Company type: Private (SARL)
- Industry: Video games
- Founded: 2006
- Defunct: September 2, 2011
- Headquarters: Paris, France
- Website: https://web.archive.org/web/20100312043523/http://www.yullaby.com:80/?

Yullaby was a French video game developer, founded by 5 former Gameloft employees in 2006 (David Nicolier, Etienne Périn, Romain Gauthier, Kévin Delbrayelle, Victor Bernot), known for their 2009 video game Magnetis for WiiWare and PC. Yullaby started as an outsourcing game development house, developing games like Horse Life and Horse Life 2 for Neko Entertainment, but tried funding and creating original games in what was the beginnings of Indie game development, but didn't meet success. Yullaby used homemade game engines and tools, as well as GameStart 3D, an earlier version of the Harfang 3D engine. On September 2, 2011, Yullaby was dissolved.

== Games ==
- Horse Life (2007)
- Horse Life 2 (2008)
- Magnetis (2009)
- Fire Panic (2009)
- Astro GP (Cancelled)
