= Rage of the Gladiator =

2010 video game

- Developer: Ghostfire Games
- Publisher: Ghostfire Games
- Designers: Ed Roman, Scott Merriam, Paul Jesperson, Christopher Brooks, Mike Roman
- Platforms: Wii, iOS, Android, Nintendo 3DS
- Release: WiiWare: NA: March 15, 2010; EU: April 16, 2010; iOS, Android; November 21, 2012; Nintendo 3DS; September 19, 2013
- Genre: Fighting
- Mode: Single-player

Rage of the Gladiator is a 2010 fighting video game developed and published by American studio Ghostfire Games for the Wii. Initially released on the WiiWare service, it was later ported to the Nintendo 3DS, iOS and Android. It is the second WiiWare game to use the Wii MotionPlus. The gameplay is similar to the gameplay of Punch-Out!!.

== Plot ==
The player controls Gracius, prince of the city-state of Avalance. The King took Gracius's mother, Maia, as a bride by defeating the nearby city of Angalore. Gracius was born minutes before his twin brother, Luthor. Maia died in child birth, but prayed to the gods for her sons to be blessed with great strength and valor. A week prior to the start of the game's events, Gracius and Luthor were made aware of their father's death. King Marius had been killed in his sleep, and witnesses claimed Gracius was the murderer. Gracius's own soldiers handcuffed him and took him away. Luthor told them to stop, but was restrained and ignored.

It is eventually revealed that Luthor had framed Gracius to take the throne for himself, and Gracius bitterly accepts his own naive nature at not seeing the truth.

== Gameplay ==
To win, the player must wait for the right moment, then dodge, jump, or block the enemy's attacks. After avoiding an attack, the player may retaliate. Additionally, the player may counter-attack while the enemy is performing an attack. Once the player learns to exploit the weakness of each enemy with the proper timing and agility, they can use this knowledge to defeat them.

In the Wii version, once the player has beaten the first 10 opponents in "Normal Mode", the player must face them all again in "Challenge Mode". In this mode, the opponent gain new powers and are much more difficult. The final opponent is unlocked at the end of Challenge Mode.

In the iOS and Android versions, the same opponents are used, but the player must fight each of them three times, and Lord Vensor III, the penultimate unique opponent, is faced after fighting the first two variations of the previous opponents. A star system is used to control when players are allowed to fight the next few opponents, and stars are earned from winning standard matches, as well as two challenge matches for each opponent where the player must fulfill (a) certain condition(s) to win, such as a time limit and/or performing a certain number of counterattacks. This version features a new armory where players can customize their weapons and armor, which feature stronger gear sets that must be purchased with "gems", a premium currency that is accrued mostly through in-app purchases. One notable difference in the plot is that Prince Luther manages to escape capture after the final fight and Gracius is haunted by his "betrayal", unlike in the WiiWare version, where he was caught.

In all versions, after each fight, the player is able to upgrade their abilities before moving on to the next opponent, using a Skill tree. Completely filling the skill tree in the WiiWare version will unlock the Brutal Victory move, which can be used to unleash a very long combo with massive damage if the player's mana gauge is full and has an open opportunity to attack. The Brutal Victory skill is unlocked in the mobile versions by starting up the game at a certain time of day for four sets of five consecutive days.

The player is awarded "skill points" after each victory, which they can use to upgrade their character in one of three ways. Offense skills focus on increasing attack power, gaining critical strikes, leeching health from opponents and conjuring spells. Defense skills focus on taking less damage, improved blocking, the ability to heal in combat, and the ability to resurrect from death. Magic skills focus on generating more energy to perform combos, channeling electricity into opponents, and summoning spells like lightning and tornados.

== Development ==
Rage of the Gladiator was developed by Ghostfire Games, a video game developer based in Austin, Texas; it was their second game after Helix and their final game before the studio's closure. According to an interview with Joystiq, Ghostfire Games CEO Ed Roman stated that "The game consists entirely of boss fights. After all, boss fights are the most interesting aspects of most video games. So we skipped the "fodder" creatures. Each boss is essentially a little "puzzle" that you need to figure out how to defeat. Some require dexterity, others require memorization, and some require listening to what they're saying very carefully so that you react to their attacks appropriately."

In the same interview, Roman cited the 1991 Neo Geo game Crossed Swords as inspiration for the first-person fighting concept, in addition to influences from several popular games, such as the combat system in Punch-Out!!, the combo system in God of War, the cutscenes in Final Fantasy, and the tech trees in Diablo or World of Warcraft, as well as the background music in films such as 300.

== Reception ==
Daemon Hatfield of IGN rated the game an 8.5/10 score, praising its diverse control schemes and impressive production quality. The site also rated the game as the 11th best WiiWare game of all time.

Sean Aaron of Nintendo Life gave the game a 9/10, praising the game's unique and fun gameplay as well as its quality comparable to that of Punch-Out!!.

GameZone's Dan Liebman gave the game an 8 out of 10, saying "Ghostfire Games offers a new twist on the classic boxing simulator with Rage of the Gladiator. The mechanics are fairly familiar, and easy to grasp even if you're a newcomer. Using the first-person perspective, the player is thrust into the sandals of Gracius, a comically melodramatic aristocrat-turned-brawler who must face a slew of bizarre enemies in the arena." and "With an emphasis on feel-good playability, it's hard to go wrong with Rage of the Gladiator. Any old school boxing gamer will feel right at home."
