= Niki – Rock 'n' Ball =

2008 video game

- Developer: Bplus
- Publisher: Bplus
- Platform: WiiWare
- Release: EU: December 19, 2008; NA: January 26, 2009
- Genre: Action
- Modes: Single-player, multiplayer

Niki – Rock 'n' Ball is a game produced by Austrian studio Bplus for the WiiWare. It was first released in Europe on December 19, 2008, and later in North America on January 26, 2009. The game runs on 2.5D graphics.

== Plot ==
The game is set in the far future. In one planetary system all the living creatures have been transformed into balls and attacked by the monsters. Players take control of Niki, who has been turned into a ball and attempt to stand up against the monsters to protect his village. When Niki comes across a mysterious ZeLeLi amulet, which gives him the ability to change into a hard rock, giving him the ability to defeat the monsters. Players must help Niki chase away all the monsters before they become too overwhelming in number and take over his village.

== Reception ==
The game received "generally unfavorable" reviews, according to video game review aggregator Metacritic. IGN criticized its controls, art style, and general game concept. GameSpot concurred.
