= 2 Fast 4 Gnomz =

2012 video game

- Developer: QubicGames
- Publisher: QubicGames: JP: Flyhigh Works
- Platforms: Nintendo 3DS, Wii
- Release: Wii: NA: 23 February 2012; EU: 26 April 2012; Nintendo 3DS: NA: 1 November 2012; EU: 6 December 2012; JP: 26 June 2013
- Genre: Platform
- Mode: Single-player

2 Fast 4 Gnomz is an action adventure platform video game developed and published by Polish studio QubicGames in North America and Europe, with Flyhigh Works publishing it in Japan. It was released on the WiiWare for Wii in 2012, and for the eShop for the Nintendo 3DS in late 2012 to early 2013.

== Gameplay ==
The user plays as Bumb, a gnome who has to save a princess, and has to complete various platform-style levels. While traversing the game, players can collect socks found throughout the levels. The controller's D-pad is used to change movement style, from slamming into trees to speeding up or reversing time. The game takes places in different settings, mainly in the forest. However, after completing initial 40 levels, in the Wii version, players get to play a new set of 40 levels taking place at night, which are more difficult and utilizes all 4 skills learned throughout the game, alongside having Bumb running to the left instead of the right. In the 3DS version, after completing the initial 40 levels, players are taken to "The Nightmare", in which certain criteria needs to be met in order to progress. The first 4 levels of this section require players to obtain 80 stars, a mechanic exclusive to the 3DS version, from the four worlds (stylized as worlds I, II, III, and IV. "Collect at least 80 stars from the (I-st/II-nd/III-rd/IV-th^{sic}) world.") respectively to be unlocked, and the fifth level requiring 26 stars from the initial 4 levels ("Collect at least 26 stars from other nightmares.") of this section to be unlocked. The Wii version contains 80 levels, while the 3DS version contains only 45 levels, with a total of 405 stars to be earned through the number of socks collected, time taken to reach the finish (unlocked by completing World II-10 (2–10), which unlocks the speed ability), and the number of deaths.

== Development ==
2 Fast 4 Gnomz was developed by Polish development studio QubicGames. Developer Michał Dys stated the concept arose from imagining garden gnomes as guardians of the house garden and celebrating their "stoicism and courage". The game was originally intended as a DSi and Wiiware hybrid, but moved to the Wii as the console was better able to handle a higher number of elements onscreen.

== Reception ==
Reception

Aggregate score
Aggregator	Score
Metacritic	65%

Review scores
Publication	Score
Nintendo Life	7/10
Nintendo World Report	7/10
Official Nintendo Magazine	59%

According to review aggregator website Metacritic, the 3DS version of 2 Fast 4 Gnomz has "mixed or average reviews. Nintendo Life described the game as "fast, fun and challenging", and praised its "charming" art style and sense of humour. Nintendo World Report found its time-rewinding mechanic "clever" and noted it had freer movement than usual in the platforming genre, but critiqued its trial and error gameplay and difficult to notice obstacles. Official Nintendo Magazine UK felt the game was average, enjoying the platforming gameplay and abilities, but felt its presentation was "drab" and "utterly repellent" which impacted the game's charm.
