= Plättchen Twist 'n' Paint =

2008 video game

- Developer: Bplus
- Publisher: Bplus
- Platform: Wii (WiiWare)
- Release: EU: September 12, 2008; NA: September 22, 2008
- Genre: Puzzle
- Modes: Single-player, multiplayer 1-8 players

Plättchen Twist 'n' Paint is a video game for the Wii by Austrian developer Bplus, who describe the game as a "puzzle shooter". It was the first third party WiiWare title to be announced.

The game was released in Europe on September 12, 2008, and in North America on September 22, 2008. It is priced at 1500 Wii Points in Europe, and 1000 Wii Points in North America.

== Gameplay ==
Plättchen Twist 'n' Paint involves painting a sequence of tiles, called "plättchen" (which means "platelet" in German) the same color to make them disappear, with special tiles also painted in the sequence contributing to a point meter that must be filled in order to pass the stage. In addition to a short time limit to paint their tiles, the player must contend with items on the play field that hinder their progress, obstacles that can destroy their personified cursor, gravity that shifts tiles across the play area and unpaintable tiles.

The game includes a single player mode as well as several offline multiplayer modes where up to 8 players can take part. The single player mode includes over 100 levels, which developer Bplus claims can take from minutes to weeks to perfect.

Players use the pointer function of the Wii Remote, twisting it left and right to change the color to be painted. The game also features support for the Wii Zapper, with the developers claiming that playing with the Zapper brings some advantages over the other available controller configurations. Plättchen was originally intended to include a multiplayer mode which made use of four sets of DK Bongos, but Nintendo has requested this functionality to be removed. It was replaced by a new "Bomb Rain Party Mode". In addition, the game also features "Copycat" and "Mission" modes which must be unlocked.

== Reception ==
WiiWare World gave Plättchen Twist 'n' Paint a 3/10, deriding the overcomplexity of the game and the high price it was being sold at in Europe, which they said was "extortionate". In summary, they called the game "the videogame equivalent of trying to pat your head and rub your stomach at the same time; there are too many elements to consider in tandem for this to be considered to be much fun". Eurogamer, which gave the game 5/10, called Plättchen "a game buried under an avalanche of ideas, few of which are adequately developed or incorporated into a coherent play experience" with its more interesting elements "obscured by a deluge of vaguely explained and often conflicting gameplay concepts". Nintendo Power rated this game "Grumble Grumble", stating that "everything is about the game is overly complex - from a lack of clear level goals to the seemingly random need to shoot down asteroids while matching up colored tiles."

On the other side, IGN rated the game with 7.4/10 (Decent), calling it a "pretty entertaining game and some great (but strange) concepts buried within this very unconventional WiiWare offering." They say: "if you're looking for something truly original, and don't mind taking a gamble, Plattchen is certainly a one-of-a-kind offering."
