= Neves (video game) =

2007 video game

- Developer: Yuke's
- Publishers: JP/NA: Yuke's; EU: Ignition Entertainment; AU: Atlus
- Platforms: Nintendo DS, Wii
- Release: Nintendo DS: NA: 6 November 2007; JP: 15 November 2007; EU: 28 March 2008; AU: 8 May 2008; Wii: JP: 26 May 2009; NA: 22 June 2009; EU: 11 June 2010
- Genre: Puzzle
- Modes: Single-player, multiplayer

Neves, known in Japan as Hamekomi Lucky Puzzle DS (ハメコミ LUCKY PUZZLE DS, Hamekomi Rakkī Pazuru Dīesu), is a puzzle video game developed by Yuke's Media Creations for the Nintendo DS, based on the Japanese Lucky Puzzle, a tangram-like dissection puzzle. In the game, players use the stylus to move, rotate and flip pieces on the DS's touch screen to clear puzzles. It features over 500 different puzzles from which to choose.

A sequel, Neves Plus (Hamekomi Lucky Puzzle Wii (ハメコミ LUCKY PUZZLE Wii, Hamekomi Rakkī Pazuru Uī) in Japan), was released for WiiWare in Japan on 26 May 2009, in North America on 22 June 2009 and in Europe on 11 June 2010.

== Gameplay ==
In each puzzle the player is given an image which they then must try to recreate using only the following seven pieces:

- two identical right isosceles triangles, with sides length $\scriptstyle{1/2}$ and hypotenuse of length $\scriptstyle{1/\sqrt{2}}$
- four right trapezoids of various sizes - the side lengths are given with the first three sides creating the two right angles:
  - two have side lengths $\scriptstyle{1/4}$, $\scriptstyle{1/4}$, $\scriptstyle{1/2}$, and $\scriptstyle{1/2\sqrt{2}}$
  - one has side lengths $\scriptstyle{1/2\sqrt{2}}$, $\scriptstyle{1/2\sqrt{2}}$, $\scriptstyle{1/\sqrt{2}}$, and $\scriptstyle{1/2}$
  - one has side lengths $\scriptstyle{1/\sqrt{2}}$, $\scriptstyle{1/2\sqrt{2}}$, $\scriptstyle{3/2\sqrt{2}}$, and $\scriptstyle{1/2}$
- one home plate-like pentagon, with sides $\scriptstyle{1/2}$, $\scriptstyle{1/2}$, $\scriptstyle{1/2}$, $\scriptstyle{1/2\sqrt{2}}$, and $\scriptstyle{1/2\sqrt{2}}$

The seven pieces form a rectangle of length 1 by 5/4.

== Game modes ==
- Tutorial: Learn the controls and how to play.
- Silhouettes?: Standard play mode. Solve puzzles with no time restriction.
- Time Pressure: Mode for experienced players. Stages have a time limit of 3 minutes. Players must try to solve each puzzle in less than a minute.
- 7 steps: Advanced mode for expert players. The player must place each piece perfectly with no room for mistakes.

With the Bragging Rights mode, multiple Neves players can compete with others who do not have a copy of the game via DS Download Play.

== WiiWare version ==
Players of the WiiWare version of the game called NEVES Plus, (known as NEVES Plus: Pantheon of Tangrams in Europe) use the Wii Remote to grab and rotate puzzle pieces, with up to four players being able to solve the puzzle simultaneously or compete against each other in teams of two. The game also features new multiplayer modes and an Ancient Egypt-themed setting. A sequel of the game called NEVES Plus Returns (Hamekomi Lucky Puzzle Wii Returns) was released for WiiWare in Japan.

== Reception ==
Reception

Aggregate score
Aggregator	Score	
Aggregator	DS	Wii
Metacritic	70/100	76/100

Review scores
Publication	Score	
Publication	DS	Wii
Destructoid	8/10	N/A
Eurogamer	7/10	N/A
Famitsu	27/40	N/A
GameSpot	6.5/10	N/A
GameZone	7/10	N/A
IGN	7.5/10	8/10
Nintendo Life	N/A	7/10
Official Nintendo Magazine	79%	73%
Pocket Gamer	3.5/5	N/A
VideoGamer.com	7/10	N/A
Den of Geek	2/5	N/A

Neves received "mixed or average reviews", while Neves Plus received "generally favourable reviews", according to the review aggregation website Metacritic. In Japan, Famitsu gave the former a score of one six and three sevens for a total of 27 out of 40.

Craig Harris of IGN said that the DS version was fun and appealing but too expensive for the amount of stuff it offers. Den of Geek criticised its very frustrating controls. Hexus didn't gave Neves a score but praised the amount of levels. The site also stated that the game lacks Wi-Fi and multiple profile feature. Todd Melick of GamePro called the same DS version "an addictive puzzle solving experience. Other than the drawback of the $30 price, my only real gripe with the game is that the jazz inspired soundtrack gets repetitive. The gameplay may grow old to some, but if you're looking for a mind-bending experience, Neves is a game that will keep you thinking." (Note: GamePro gave the DS version two 4/5 scores for graphics and fun factor, 3.5/5 for sound, and 5/5 for control.) However, Andrew Ramsey later gave Neves Plus four out of five, saying, "While Neves Plus seems like its [sic] barebones there is actually a lot going for this package. The only letdown is a lack of an online mode. But with all the puzzles you get and the many modes to play this is certainly another winner to add on Nintendo's list, especially since its sporting a 600 point price tag. So grab your friends and get ready to solve some puzzles, especially some of the odd ones featuring Japanese caricatures."
