= Stickmen Studios =

New Zealand video game company

- Industry: Video game industry Entertainment industry
- Headquarters: Christchurch, New Zealand

Stickmen Studios (also known as Stickmen Limited) was formed in 2006 and creates games for various computer platforms. Its sister company is CerebralFix Limited, a social media network game development studio founded in 2009. Both companies are based in Christchurch, New Zealand, and their products target the internet download market.

CerebralFix's directors are Jeremy Cadillac and Benjamin Dellaca of Christchurch. Cadillac and Dellaca are directors of Stickmen Limited. Dellaca is CEO of CerebralFix. Both businesses employ over 35 staff, up from 6 in 2008.

== Government funding ==
Stickmen Studios first game in 2009, Dragon Master Spell Caster, got panned by gamers. However, the company did obtain $300,000 in New Zealand Government Ministry of Science and Innovation research and development funding to create an international market for their gaming technologies as well as evaluating new technologies to help autistic children.

To help autistic children the Ministry invested in a partnership between Stickmen and Crown research institute, Industrial Research Limited (IRL), to develop Wii game Kung Fu Funk, a console game released in May 2010 using motion sensing controls to encourage upper body movement. Reviews by users of the game on gaming websites were quite negative. The project demonstrated the power of incorporating movement science into interactive games, resulting in Stickmen’s 2011 launch of i-Ora Limited, a company focused on interactive media for education and rehabilitation. i-Ora is now working with IRL, the University of Auckland’s UniServices, and Korean firm Yujin Robotics Co to develop devices to educationally assist autistic children. They have also helped develop a game-based rehabilitation device for people recovering from strokes, which follows a rehabilitation format known as gaming rehabilitation.

The companies office was destroyed in the 2011 Christchurch earthquake. In 2012 William McLellan and his friend and business partner Colin Anderson were also responsible for the approval, design and construction of a Government Funded IT business hub (Referred to as the EPIC IT Hub – Enterprise Precinct and Innovation Campus) on Manchester Street in Central Christchurch. Both CerebralFix and Stickmen Studios will take up residence in this building in August 2012 along with several other earthquake affected Christchurch businesses.

== CerebralFix limited ==
CerebralFix is a New Zealand game developer company based in Christchurch, New Zealand. It was founded in March 2009 by Ben Dellaca and Jeremy Cadillac as spin-off from sister-company Stickmen Studios. Stickmen Studios was later absorbed by CerebralFix. In early 2016 they opened a second office in Westport, New Zealand. CerebralFix specializes in developing social, casual and mobile games for international brands such as Disney, Lionsgate, DreamWorks and BBC. The company develops games under a ‘work for hire’ model but have also ventured into developing games under its own brand using a Freemium model. As of 2015 the CerebralFix employed 54 staff.

== Employment opportunities ==
Both companies have also been working with the Ministry of Social Development by providing employment opportunities for computer savvy youngsters who had nowhere to put their talents to use. Between 2008 and 2011 Stickmen Studios took on 21 jobless young people through Work and Income's Skills Investment Subsidy and Job Ops and trained them for a career in game development. In 2011 Stickmen Studios entered into a formal Industry Partnership agreement with Work and Income offering on the job training for 15 unemployed young people each year. The companies philosophy was to support Work and Income because they had supported them.

== Game development ==
Stickmen established agreements with international console developers such as Nintendo and PlayStation as part of their product development. They developed the Doc Clock game, which sold thousands of units globally and was released on the PlayStation Network in America, Asia and Europe in 2011. They were working on a sequel for release in early 2012.

CerebralFix worked with GSN and EA Games to deliver online and mobile market games. CerebralFix also partnered with Hasbro to create the online game Transformers Prime: Terracon Defence, and develop Haunted Suburb, a game built inside GSN's game portal on Facebook.
