= Tenshi no Solitaire =

2008 video game

- Developer: G-Mode
- Publisher: G-Mode
- Platform: Wii (WiiWare)
- Release: JP: March 25, 2008
- Genre: Traditional
- Mode: Single-player

Tenshi no Solitaire is a Japan-only WiiWare game developed by G-Mode. It costs 500 Wii points.

== Overview ==
The game features three basic versions of solitaire to play. Rather than using the pointer function of the Wii Remote to select and move cards, the game instead uses the Wii Remote on its side, with players using the d-pad to control an on-screen finger "cursor" which can be moved around the screen.

The game runs in 16:9 and 480p display.
