= Ateam Inc. =

Japanese mobile content provider

- Native name: 株式会社エイチーム
- Type: Public Company (kabushiki gaisha)
- Traded as: TYO: 3662
- Industry: Social Applications Provider, Internet Service, Social Gaming, Global Business
- Founded: February 29, 2000
- Founder: Takao Hayashi
- Headquarters: Nagoya, Japan
- Area served: Worldwide
- Key people: Takao Hayashi, President
- Revenue: 37,674 million yen (FY 2018)
- Operating income: 4,701 million yen (FY 2018)
- Net income: 3,306 million yen (FY 2018)
- Total equity: ▲9.5 billion JPY (FY 2016)
- Number of employees: 890 (part-time employees excluded), 8 Directors (as of July 31, 2018)
- Subsidiaries: Ateam Brides Inc. Ateam Hikkoshi Samurai Inc. Ateam Lifestyle Inc. Ateam Connect Inc. Ateam Vietnam Co., Ltd. Increments Inc.
- Website: www.a-tm.co.jp/en/

Ateam Inc. is a provider of mobile content and websites based in Nagoya, Japan.

Ateam Inc. (株式会社エイチーム, Kabushiki gaisha Ateam) has three primary divisions: Lifestyle Support Business, Entertainment Business and E-Commerce Business.

The Lifestyle Support Business engages in the planning, development and operation of various online services that allow users to gather and compare information for daily use.

The Entertainment Business engages in the planning, development and operation of game and tool applications primarily for smart devices.

The E-Commerce Business engages in the planning, development and operation of an online bicycle store under the name "cyma".

Mainly advertise on radio commercials.

Prefixed Serif of "Ateam of time" at the beginning of commercial is characterized.

Re-listed on the First Section of the Tokyo Stock Exchange (TSE) 233 days after the TSE Mothers listing on April 4, 2012, is considered the fastest re-listing ever.

== History ==
- 2018
  - February: Opened a studio in Fukuoka as a development site in the area
- 2017
  - December: Acquired Increments Inc. as a wholly owned subsidiary of Ateam Inc.
- 2016
  - December: Established Ateam Vietnam Co., Ltd. as a subsidiary of Ateam Inc.
- 2015
  - December: Headquarters transferred to Nakamura Ward in Nagoya
  - September: Opened a studio in Tokyo as a development site in the area
  - September: Dissolved capital alliance with NHN Entertainment and liquidated joint venture company Ateam NHN Entertainment Corporation
- 2014
  - January: Established Joint Venture Company Ateam NHN Entertainment with NHN Entertainment Corporation
- 2013
  - December: Development collaboration with NHN Entertainment Corporation
  - August: Established Hikkoshi Samurai Inc., A.T.Support Inc., Ateam Lifestyle Inc. as subsidiaries of Ateam Inc.
  - February: Established A.T.brides Inc. as a subsidiary of Ateam Inc.
- 2012
  - November: Re-listed on the First Section of the Tokyo Stock Exchange
  - September: Opened a studio in Osaka as a development site in the area
  - April: Listed on the Tokyo Stock Exchange Mothers
- 2011
  - August: Business tie-up with GREE, Inc.
- 2010
  - July: Release of Ateam's first Android application
  - July: Commencement of women's health consultation service "LaLune"
- 2009
  - August: Release of Ateam's first social application
- 2008
  - December: Distribution of Ateam's first game for Nintendo's WiiWare begins
  - October: Release of Ateam's first application for smartphone
  - October: Launch of short-notice wedding hall booking service "Sugukon Navi"
  - September: Acquisition of JISA/JIPDEC Privacy Mark
- 2007
  - September: Launch of online used car appraisal service "Navikuru"
  - February: Headquarters transferred to Nagoya Lucent Tower
- 2006
  - September: Release of the first MMORPG "Eternal Zone"for KDDI CORPORATION EZ web application (BREW)
  - June: Launch of Ateam’s first Lifestyle Support service "Hikkoshi Samurai", a Moving company search service
- 2004
  - November: Organizational change to joint stock corporation
- 2003
  - December: Began operating official websites for mobile phones
- 2000
  - February: Ateam Ltd. Established in Tajimi, Gifu Prefecture
- 1997
  - June: Takao Hayashi gets his first contract as freelance software developer in Toki City, Gifu

== Subsidiaries ==
- Ateam Brides Inc.
- Ateam Hikkoshi Samurai Inc.
- Ateam Lifestyle Inc.
- Ateam Connect Inc.
- Ateam Vietnam Co., Ltd.
- Increments Inc.

== Business ==
- Entertainment
- Lifestyle Support
- E-Commerce

== Content Guidelines ==
=== Smartphone Game Applications ===
- BASSA WARRIORS
- Valkyrie Connect
- Unison League
- Derby Impact
- War of Legions
- Dark Summoner
- Eternal Zone
- Million Versus
- Mahjong -Rising
- Murder Room
- Prison Breaking Girl-Lie
- Shōjo Kageki Revue Starlight Re:LIVE
- Sangoku Taisen Smash!

=== Other Mobile Contents ===
- ［+］HOME (for Android)
- ［+］icon (for iOS)
- zero app

└Good Night's Sleep Alarm
└Quick Calorie Control

=== Internet Service ===
- Hikkoshi Samurai (Moving company search service)
- Navikuru (Online used car appraisal service)
- Hanayume (Short-notice wedding hall booking service)
- Navi Navi Cashing (Comprehensive Card Loan service)
- LaLune (Women's health consultation service)
