= Bruiser and Scratch =

2008 video game

- Developer(s): Steel Penny Games
- Publisher(s): Steel Penny Games
- Platform(s): Wii
- Release: NA: December 8, 2008
- Genre(s): Puzzle, adventure
- Mode(s): Single-player

Bruiser & Scratch is a WiiWare game developed and produced by American studio Steel Penny Games. It was released in North America on December 8, 2008, but it is no longer on the WiiWare service.

== Story ==
Bruiser is a male dog who wears a tartan flat cap and a studded collar. Scratch is a female cat who wears a flower in her hair and a heart-shaped necklace. The game begins as the pair are having a walk in some nearby woods. Scratch spots a large paw-shaped marking in the ground and calls Bruiser over to have a look. However just as she does so a thin vapour comes up out of the ground and becomes a door. Bruiser trips over and they both go tumbling through the doorway.

== Gameplay ==
The game is split into a series of levels in which the player takes control of either Bruiser or Scratch depending on the level. The aim of the game is to try to escape each level by creating a portal out of different random objects. The player does this by pushing these objects together to form a completely new object to create a portal out of the level. Objects move in a straight line and are controlled by a four-direction one-button interface. There are a few tutorials to introduce a player to the game and the actual story takes place over 48 puzzles and six landscapes. Challenge mode also offers 75 additional puzzles that range in difficulty.

== Reception ==
Wiiloveit.com gave the game a 20/30, commenting that the game is "really challenging for almost all ages", and "will last you many, many hours". Unfortunately, the mediocre presentation and the "high price tag" are big put-off's to an otherwise pretty good game.
