= Viral Survival =

2009 video game

- Developer: PeakVox
- Publishers: JP: Fun Unit Inc. (Wii); WW: NIS America (Wii); WW: PeakVox (PC)
- Platforms: Wii, Microsoft Windows
- Release: Wii: JP: June 9, 2009; NA: May 24, 2010; EU: February 11, 2011; Windows; November 9, 2016
- Genre: Action
- Mode: Single-player

Viral Survival, known in Japan as peakvox escape virus (ピークボックス エスケープ ウイルス, PīkuBokkusu Esukēpu Vairusu), is an action game developed by PeakVox and published by Fun Unit Inc. and NIS America for Wii in 2009-2011. The game was later released worldwide for Microsoft Windows via Steam under the name PeakVox Escape Virus HD on November 9, 2016.

== Reception ==
Reception

Aggregate score
| Aggregator | Score |
|---|---|
| Metacritic | 66/100 |

Review scores
| Publication | Score |
|---|---|
| Destructoid | 7.5/10 |
| Eurogamer | 7/10 |
| GamesMaster | 65% |
| IGN | 7/10 |
| NGamer | 40% |
| Nintendo Life | 7/10 |

The Wii version received "average" reviews according to the review aggregation website Metacritic.
