= Robox =

2010 video game

- Developer: Dreambox Games
- Publisher: Dreambox Games
- Platform: Wii
- Release: WW: November 1, 2010
- Genre: Platform-adventure
- Mode: Single-player

Robox is a non-linear side-scrolling game developed by DreamBox Games in which the player controls the eponymous robot and explores the depths of an alien planet. Robox received negative reviews, with reviewers describing it as confusing and tedious, albeit visually pleasing. It was released onto WiiWare and was first sold on April 15, 2010.

== Synopsis ==
The player character, Robox, is a space probe sent to a mysterious island to investigate the disappearance of other probes and such.

== Gameplay ==
Robox contains obstacles that can be traversed once they discover a certain item or ability, such as an arm that breaks blocks. This gameplay has been compared to the Metroid series. There are a total of three different planets in the game.

== Reception ==
Robox received poor reviews, sitting at 50/100 on Metacritic. Nintendo Life gave the game 5 out of 10 stars and said "Robox is a game with some good ideas that unfortunately aren't capitalized on nearly enough," concluding that players expecting a straightforward game "will wander aimlessly, bemoaning the lack of a map and swearing intermittently." It also disliked the trial-and-error gameplay, writing that the "constant repetition of quite lengthy bits of gameplay can frustrate after a while." Nintendo-x2 gave the game 5.6/10, declaring that it "fails to provide much in the way of entertainment for anyone other than the most patient gamer" and finding that it was highly repetitive, though it did reserve praise for the game's visuals. Eurogamer gave the game 4/10, describing it as "slow, clunky and tedious" and declaring that it had "dreadful shooting mechanics".
