= Gravitronix =

2009 video game

- Developer: Medaverse Studios
- Designer: Jesse Lowther
- Engine: ForPlay
- Platform: WiiWare
- Release: NA: October 12, 2009
- Genre: Action
- Modes: Single player, Multiplayer

Gravitronix is an action video game created by American independent developer Medaverse Studios for the Wii video game console. The game was released in North America on October 12, 2009, as a downloadable WiiWare title.

== Gameplay ==
Gravitronix is an action/battle game for 1-8 players on a single screen and uses different primitive shapes (cubes, pyramids, spheres, lines) as projectiles and utilizes unique physics per object.

The actual gameplay of Gravitronix was kept under wraps by Medaverse, as they feared their idea would be taken before Gravitronix comes to market. The game involves defending territory on screen while simultaneously attempting to assault the territories of the up to 7 other players by using the aforementioned projectiles. The game features 8 player simultaneous play with four players holding a Wii Remote and four holding the attached Nunchuk.

The game revolves around twisting either a Wii Remote or Nunchuk and pressing two buttons. The player will twist to move a gravity platform back and forth within a set territory and use the two buttons (A and B or C and Z) to fire one of two gravity beams which will either capture projectiles or launch them away. The goal is to break through the other players' defenses and send a projectile into their territory to defeat them.

Medaverse hopes to feature online play but they have made mention that the feature is still up in the air, and in an interview Medaverse CEO said that "We had hoped to have online multiplayer, but it just wasn't going to be an option for our first game."

=== Characters ===
Gravitronix features a number of different characters which the player can select to represent them on screen. According to Medaverse president Jesse Lowther, "we do have plans for many future games and Gravitronix includes a number of characters who will appear in those games. Since we also wanted selectable characters for Gravitronix, we decided it would be a perfect fit to fill the Gravitronix roster with characters who will (hopefully) appear in future Medaverse games." Character selection does not have any impact on gameplay.

== Development ==
Gravitronix was developed by Medaverse Studios, a game design firm located in Dover, New Hampshire. The game began development by a team of only three people, which had grown to seven by completion. Tasks such as music and sound effects were contracted out.

One of the main goals in developing Gravitronix was to keep the game size as small as possible in response to Wii consumers' complaints about the size of the console's memory storage. The game engine was written from scratch, requiring nearly a year of development time, and low resolution graphics were used to conserve memory. Designer Jesse Lowther later expressed regret for pursuing this goal, given that the release of Wii System Update 4.0 ironically addressed the issue by allowing software to be saved and run directly from SD cards.

== Reception ==
Reception

Aggregate scores
Aggregator	Score
GameRankings	50.71%
Metacritic	46

Review scores
Publication	Score
IGN	4.5 / 10
Nintendo Life	2/10
Nintendo World Report	3.5 / 10

Gravitronix received generally negative reviews, gaining aggregate scores of 50.71% and 46 on GameRankings and Metacritic, respectively.
