= NyxQuest: Kindred Spirits =

2009 video game

- Developer: Over the Top Games
- Publisher: Over the Top Games
- Designers: Rob Alvarez de Lara; Dr Juan de Lara; Mauro López Arias; Enrique Orrego
- Platforms: WiiWare, Windows, Mac OS X, iOS, Android
- Release: WiiWare: EU: June 19, 2009; NA: August 10, 2009; Windows, Mac OS X September 27, 2010 iOS; July 6, 2011; Android; March 20, 2019
- Genre: Platform
- Modes: Single-player, multiplayer

NyxQuest: Kindred Spirits (formerly Icarian: Kindred Spirits) is a platform game, originally released for WiiWare by Spanish developers Over the Top Games. It was released in 2009 for the PAL regions on June 19, and for North America on August 10. The game was later released in Japan on May 11, 2010. Versions for Windows and Mac OS X were released on September 27, 2010 through the game's official website and Steam. The game was ported to the iOS as NyxQuest on July 6, 2011 and to the Android on March 20, 2019.

== Gameplay ==
NyxQuest screenshot

As Nyx progresses through the game, players are given special powers by gods such as Zeus and Eolus which gives them the ability to move objects, manipulate the scenery, control the wind and to cast thunder-bolts to kill enemies.

Wii players control Nyx and the powers of the gods by using the Wii Remote and Nunchuk. Players use the analogue stick on the Nunchuk to move Nyx and control her flight, while powers are cast by pointing at the screen and onto different objects with an onscreen reticule. The Wii version also features a two-player cooperative mode, with one player directly controlling Nyx and the other controlling the gods' powers.

== Plot ==
The game is set in Ancient Greece and incorporates mythological creatures and the Greek gods into the world of the game. Players control Nyx, a winged girl, who has befriended Icarus after he flies to her realm in the sky. When Icarus mysteriously disappears, Nyx sets out to find him in the ruined world below.

== Development ==
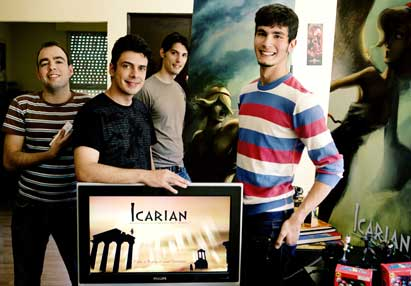
The founders of Over the Top Games. (Left to right) Mauro López Arias, Enrique Orrego, Rob de Lara and Juan de Lara.

NyxQuest: Kindred Spirits is Over the Top's first project as a company, and was developed by a team of four people. The developer decided to use the Ancient Greece setting to explore the idea of a character who requires help from the Greek gods to advance in her adventure, and chose the Wii as a platform to take advantage of gameplay mechanics that use the Wii Remote. The team also wanted to create a game that had a flying character with wings. In early prototypes of the game, Icarus was the main playable character, but was changed to Nyx to make the story more interesting.

The game features nineteen minutes of music from composer Steven Gutheinz. The developers only intended to use five minutes of music but were impressed enough to use everything he had composed for the project. Gutheinz worked from concept drawings, screenshots and video from the unfinished game to develop the soundtrack.

The game was originally released under the name Icarian: Kindred Spirits, but was changed for legal reasons. A port of the game for Windows and Mac OS X computers was released on September 27, 2010, through the game's official website and Steam. It features enhanced graphics and is controlled with the keyboard and mouse. The version from the official website is completely D.R.M. free, while the Steam version is SteamPlay enabled and includes Steam Achievements. The two-player mode is missing from the P.C. port. Demos for both Windows and Mac OS X versions are available on the game's website.

== Reception ==
Reception

Aggregate score
Aggregator	Score		
Aggregator	iOS	PC	Wii
Metacritic	79/100	67/100	82/100

Review scores
Publication	Score		
Publication	iOS	PC	Wii
Destructoid	8/10	N/A	8/10
Edge	N/A	N/A	8/10
Eurogamer	N/A	N/A	8/10
GamePro	4/5	N/A	N/A
GameRevolution	N/A	N/A	B+
IGN	7.5/10	N/A	8.5/10
Nintendo Life	N/A	N/A	9/10
Nintendo World Report	N/A	N/A	8/10
Official Nintendo Magazine	N/A	N/A	85%
PC Gamer (UK)	N/A	65%	N/A
Teletext GameCentral	N/A	N/A	7/10

The Wii and iOS versions of NyxQuest: Kindred Spirits received "favorable" reviews according to the review aggregation website Metacritic, with a score of 82 out of 100. Nintendo Life greatly praised NyxQuest's presentation and gameplay, and described it as "pure platforming bliss", while as one of the critiques to the game was it short duration of three hours. While the Wii version still had its original Icarian title, Edge called it a "surprisingly robust platformer" and "a simple pleasure" with perfect pacing, creative levels and exquisite presentation. Eurogamer stated that said console version stood out from its WiiWare peers and compared it favorably to the game Braid. IGN called it a slow going but otherwise "fun and beautiful" WiiWare game with intelligently conceived and executed control mechanics and smart environmental puzzles. The same website said that the iOS version delivers "memorable" puzzle platforming that requires some thinking and challenge.

The Wii version was awarded "Best Indie Game" at the 2009 Campus Party event. Due to its similar themes, the game has been likened to the Kid Icarus series.

In 2017, HobbyConsolas named NyxQuest one of the greatest Spanish games ever released.
