= ShadowPlay =

2010 video game

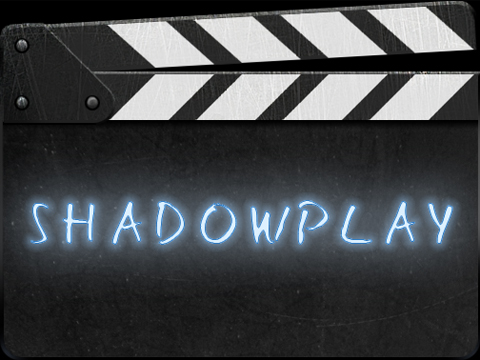
- Developer: Deep Fried Entertainment
- Publisher: Deep Fried Entertainment
- Platform: Wii (WiiWare)
- Release: NA: January 11, 2010
- Genre: Puzzle
- Modes: Single-player, Multiplayer (Local Co-op)

ShadowPlay is a puzzle game developed and published by Canadian studio Deep Fried Entertainment exclusively for WiiWare on the Wii video game console. The shadow puppetry-inspired game play focuses on manipulating and combining the shadows of objects in order to create a larger shadow that resembles a particular thing, specifically animals, items, and symbols.

The game was released on the Wii Shop Channel in North America on January 11, 2010, and is one of the first WiiWare games to utilize the Wii MotionPlus accessory.

== Gameplay ==
In ShadowPlay, the player's objective is to create a shadow that matches a shadow target on a backdrop by manipulating given objects using the Wii Remote. Objects can be rotated to change the shape of their shadows, or the object's distance from the light source is changed to enlarge or shrink the shadow's size. Players are scored on how fast they can arrange the objects to match the given shadow target, and how accurately the created shadow matches the target. There are 100 puzzles available, divided amongst 10 distinct "themes." A sandbox mode is available where players can freely experiment with all the game's available objects in order to create their own shadow art.

The game offers two modes of control: the Wii Remote with the Nunchuk accessory, or with the Wii MotionPlus accessory. The Nunchuk gives the player the ability to rotate objects using the Nunchuk's analog stick, while the Wii MotionPlus allows players to fully rotate the entire controller in order to rotate individual objects.

Players may play as a single player or with more than one player in local co-op mode where players can collaboratively work on challenges together.

== Reception ==
Reception

Aggregate scores
| Aggregator | Score |
|---|---|
| GameRankings | 71.25% |
| Metacritic | 72 |

Review scores
| Publication | Score |
|---|---|
| IGN | 7.5/10 |
| Nintendo Life | 7/10 |
| Nintendo World Report | 7/10 |

ShadowPlay received generally positive reviews. IGN awarded the game a 7.5 out of 10, praising the decision to include Wii MotionPlus compatibility, calling it "spot-on" and "well-suited," but criticized the game's longevity, specifically the small number of available puzzles.
