= Overturn =

2008 video game for WiiWare

- Developer: Studio Zan
- Publishers: Studio Zan; Gamebridge (Europe)
- Platform: WiiWare
- Release: JP: December 2, 2008; EU: February 12, 2010; NA: August 3, 2009
- Genre: Action
- Modes: Single-player, multiplayer

Overturn is a video game developed by Japanese company Studio Zan for WiiWare. It was released in Japan on December 2, 2008, in North America on August 3, 2009, and in Europe on February 12, 2010, by Gamebridge as Overturn: Mecha Wars.

== Gameplay ==
The game is set on the planet Zastadion where the player competes in a tournament that sees them controlling a hovering mecha armed with an arsenal of weapons to battle others in an arena. Players can compete in six classes of increasing difficulty: Rookie, Novice, Elite, Ace, Grand and Master, and choose from eight mechas, each with different attributes. Players can also upgrade their weapons and mecha with parts scavenged from their defeated opponents as they progress through the game.

The game also supports 2 player split screen multiplayer, and up to 4 online through the Nintendo Wi-Fi Connection. It is controlled using the Wii Remote and Nunchuk, and also supports the Wii Balance Board.

== Reception ==
Although Nintendo Life found Overturn's single player component somewhat easy and underwhelming, they felt that the online multiplayer was impressive and also praised the game's presentation. However, IGN didn't find much excitement from the game's one-on-one mech battles, and noted that much of the story in the Japanese version was excised in the North American release. They were also disappointed that, despite claims in the manual, the game did not feature virtual spectators who cheered on the player.
