= Bobby Carrot =

- Developer: FDG Mobile Games
- Publisher: FDG Mobile Games
- First release: Bobby Carrot; 2004
- Latest release: Bobby Carrot: Forever; 2011

Art for the first Bobby Carrot game

Bobby Carrot is a video game series developed and published by German company FDG Mobile Games. The series currently consists of five games, all originally developed for mobile phones. The fifth game was also released for iOS as well as a WiiWare game for North America on July 21, 2011. The first game of the series has been offered for free as a pre-installed game on numerous Samsung phone models, presented by eFUSION Mobile. In 2006, Bobby Carrot 4 won the Deutscher Entwicklerpreis for Best German Mobile Game.

== Gameplay ==
Screenshot of gameplay from the first Bobby Carrot

Bobby Carrot is a puzzle game, the object of which is to collect all of the carrots in an area, and then reach a point on the map that progresses the player to the next level. In addition, there is an alternative mode where Bobby Carrot creates Easter Eggs in his path, made more challenging by the fact they cannot be passed over twice.

Throughout the game, players are met with various obstacles, from steel rabbit traps and sliding gates to locks needing a key. Subsequent games added water, tractors, and a bazaar to the initial concept.

== Installments ==
FDG released the first Bobby Carrot in 2004, and soon followed with a sequel. The game continued to see installments in 2005, 2006, and 2008. In all, there are five Bobby Carrot titles for mobile phones:

- Bobby Carrot
- Bobby Carrot 2: Winterland
- Bobby Carrot 3: Evolution
- Bobby Carrot 4: Flower Power
- Bobby Carrot 5: Forever

In addition, FDG has released an expansion pack entitled Bobby Carrot 5: Level Up!, while the iOS and WiiWare versions of the fifth game, retitled Bobby Carrot Forever, feature enhanced graphics, music and animated cut scenes.

Bobby Carrot 5: Forever is the last game in the series.
