= XGen Studios =

Independent video game studio

XGen Studios, Inc
- Type: Private
- Industry: Video games
- Founded: 2001
- Founder: Skye Boyes
- Headquarters: Edmonton, Alberta, Canada
- Key people: Kaelyn Boyes (Owner)
- Products: Super Motherload; Defend Your Castle
- Website: xgenstudios.com

XGen Studios, Inc (stylized as XGen Studios) is an independent video game development studio based in Edmonton, Alberta, Canada.

Since 2001, XGen Studios has released 14 internally developed titles for consoles, mobiles, and the web, including the WiiWare title Defend Your Castle

== History ==
XGen Studios was founded by Skye Boyes in 2001. Boyes was interested in programming in his childhood, and was studying computer science at the University of Alberta. While in university in 2003, he published a browser game made with Adobe Flash called Stick RPG. This game amassed one million plays in the first month. Skye dropped out of his computer science program, incorporated the company, and began to accumulate staff. XGen Studios followed up Stick RPG by releasing another Flash game called Motherload in 2004.

An offer to acquire the company for $8 million was made to XGen in 2007, but Boyes declined the deal. That same year, XGen Studios announced that they had obtained a license to develop for Nintendo's Wii system, and intended to develop a WiiWare title. It was revealed in 2008 that Defend Your Castle would be part of Nintendo's WiiWare launch line up.

In 2011, XGen Studios announced that they would take Amanita Design's Machinarium to WiiWare. The project was eventually cancelled as of November 2011, due to the WiiWare platform's game size limit.

In 2013, Sony announced that Super Motherload would be a day one title for the PlayStation 4.

On October 12, 2015, founder and CEO Boyes died in Vancouver after experiencing cardiac arrest. His wife Kaelyn, who had worked on the operations side of the business, took over XGen Studios, overseeing the development of The Low Road. The Low Road launched on July 26, 2017, on Valve's Steam available for PC, Mac and Linux. The following year, The Low Road was released on the Nintendo Switch.

== Console games developed ==
Title	Year	Platform(s)	Notes
Defend Your Castle	2008	Nintendo Wii, iPad, iPhone, MacOS, Windows, Android, Nintendo Switch	
Machinarium	2011	WiiWare	Port - Cancelled
Super Motherload	2013	PlayStation 4, PlayStation 3, Windows	
The Low Road	2017 & 2018	Windows, Mac, Linux, Nintendo Switch	
