= List of PlayStation minis =

This is a list of all 294 PlayStation minis (PS minis) for the PlayStation Portable, which are games available to download from the PlayStation Store. Many of them are also compatible with the PlayStation 3 (PS3), as well as a few of them with PlayStation Vita (PS Vita) and PlayStation TV (PS TV) as indicated.

== PlayStation minis ==
List of PlayStation minis
Title	Developer	Product ID (NA)	North America	Europe	Japan	Asia	PS3	PS Vita	PS TV
1000 Tiny Claws	Mediatonic	NPUZ00262	October 18, 2011	October 5, 2011	Unreleased	Unreleased			
20Q	Play	NPEZ00175	Unreleased	April 20, 2011	Unreleased	Unreleased			
3, 2, 1... Supercrash!	StormBASIC Games	NPUZ00189	November 9, 2010	November 10, 2009	Unreleased	Unreleased	Yes		
3D Twist & Match	Sanuk Games	NPUZ00176	April 12, 2011	March 30, 2011	Unreleased	Unreleased	Yes		
4×4 Jam	Invictus Games	NPUZ00104	July 6, 2010	June 23, 2010	Unreleased	Unreleased	Yes		
5-in-1 Arcade Hits	Grip Games	NPUZ00078	July 6, 2010	June 30, 2010	Unreleased	Unreleased	Yes		
5-in-1 Solitaire	Digital Leisure	NPUZ00086	January 18, 2011	October 5, 2011	Unreleased	Unreleased	Yes		
A Space Shooter for Two Bucks!	Frima Studio	NPUZ00190	December 21, 2010	December 22, 2010	Unreleased	Unreleased	Yes		
Ace Armstrong vs. the Alien Scumbags!	Laughing Jackal	NPUZ00109	September 7, 2010	October 6, 2010	Unreleased	Unreleased	Yes		
Actual Crimes: Jack the Ripper	Virtual Playground	NPUZ00110	October 5, 2010	September 1, 2009	Unreleased	Unreleased	Yes		
Aero Racer (aka Rocket Racing)	Halfbrick Studios	NPUZ00023	March 11, 2010	March 11, 2010	Unreleased	Unreleased	Yes		
Age of Hammer Wars	Dynamic Systems	NPUZ00178	October 19, 2010	April 1, 2009	Unreleased	Unreleased	Yes		
Age of Zombies	Halfbrick Studios	NPUZ00024	February 25, 2010	February 25, 2010	Unreleased	Unreleased	Yes		
Alien Havoc	Creat Studios	NPUZ00008	October 1, 2009	October 1, 2009	Unreleased	Unreleased	Yes		
Alien Zombie Death	PomPom Games	NPUZ00069	March 25, 2010	February 18, 2010	Unreleased	Unreleased	Yes		
Alpha Mission	SNK	NPUZ00133	September 6, 2011	September 14, 2009	Unreleased	Unreleased	Yes	Yes	Yes
Ambassador Kane	60°North	NPEZ00372	Unreleased	December 14, 2009	Unreleased	Unreleased			
Ancient Game Treasures Mill	G1M2	NPUZ00202	March 15, 2011	Unreleased	Unreleased	Unreleased	Yes		
Angry Birds	Rovio	NPUZ00241	January 4, 2011	January 5, 2011	Unreleased	Unreleased	Yes		
Angus Hates Aliens	Team Stendec GbR Lürig und Meyer	NPUZ00374	July 14, 2015	July 9, 2015	Unreleased	Unreleased	Yes	Yes	
Apache Overkill	Playerthree	NPUZ00098	October 5, 2010	September 29, 2009	Unreleased	Unreleased	Yes		
Aquattack!	Mere Mortals	NPUZ00182	December 7, 2010	July 7, 2010	Unreleased	Unreleased	Yes		
Arcade Air Hockey & Bowling	Icon Games	NPUZ00103	August 24, 2010	September 22, 2009	Unreleased	Unreleased	Yes		
Arcade Darts	Icon Games	NPUZ00097	June 29, 2010	June 23, 2009	Unreleased	Unreleased	Yes		
Arcade Essentials	Nordcurrent	NPUZ00116	December 7, 2010	December 8, 2010	February 23, 2012	Unreleased	Yes		
Arcade Essentials Evolution	Nordcurrent	NPUZ00258	September 13, 2011	September 14, 2009	Unreleased	Unreleased	Yes		
Arcade Pool & Snooker	Icon Games	NPUZ00281	July 10, 2012	July 13, 2012	Unreleased	Unreleased			
Archibald's Adventures	Rake in Grass	NPUZ00115	July 20, 2010	July 14, 2009	Unreleased	Unreleased	Yes		
Arctic Adventures: Polar's Puzzles	Eiconic Games	NPUZ00114	August 3, 2010	July 21, 2009	Unreleased	Unreleased	Yes		
Athena	SNK	NPUZ00151	July 19, 2011	September 7, 2009	Unreleased	Unreleased	Yes	Yes	Yes
Babel: The King of the Blocks	StormBASIC Games	NPUZ00220	June 14, 2011	June 15, 2009	Unreleased	Unreleased	Yes		
Ball Pen Koujou 2	Japan Studio	NPJP00079	Unreleased	Unreleased	April 22, 2010	Unreleased			
Basha Baloot	Quirkat	NPEZ00248	Unreleased	March 2, 2009	Unreleased	Unreleased			
Basha Card Game Collection	Quirkat	NPEZ00245	Unreleased	January 19, 2009	Unreleased	Unreleased			
Basha Tarneeb	Quirkat	NPEZ00247	Unreleased	January 19, 2009	Unreleased	Unreleased			
Basha Trix	Quirkat	NPEZ00246	Unreleased	January 19, 2009	Unreleased	Unreleased			
Bashi Blocks	Icon Games	NPUZ00123	March 23, 2011	July 27, 2011	Unreleased	Unreleased	Yes		
Battle Poker	Left Field Productions	NPUZ00020	December 10, 2009	Unreleased	Unreleased	Unreleased	Yes		
Beach Buzzin' Chopper	Asylum Entertainment	NPEZ00217	Unreleased	September 29, 2009	Unreleased	Unreleased			
Beam 'em Up	Immersive Games	NPUZ00087	June 15, 2010	December 10, 2009	Unreleased	Unreleased	Yes		
Bee Wars	Gameshastra	NPEZ00034	Unreleased	October 26, 2009	Unreleased	Unreleased			
Bermuda Triangle	SNK	NPUZ00152	January 24, 2012	February 15, 2012	Unreleased	Unreleased	Yes	Yes	Yes
Best of Solitaire	Cosmigo	NPUZ00082	June 1, 2011	June 15, 2009	Unreleased	Unreleased	Yes		
Blast Off	Halfbrick Studios	NPUZ00021	November 24, 2009	November 26, 2009	Unreleased	Unreleased	Yes		
Blimp: The Flying Adventures	Craneballs Studio	NPUZ00120	December 7, 2010	December 8, 2010	Unreleased	Unreleased	Yes		
Block Cascade Fusion	Gamelion Studios	NPUZ00218	June 1, 2011	June 2, 2009	Unreleased	Unreleased	Yes		
Bloons	Ninja Kiwi	NPUZ00010	October 1, 2009	October 1, 2009	Unreleased	Unreleased	Yes		
Bloons TD	Ninja Kiwi	NPUZ00186	February 22, 2011	November 10, 2011	Unreleased	Unreleased	Yes	Yes	Yes
Boom Beats	Gamelion Studios	NPUZ00194	December 7, 2010	October 27, 2010	Unreleased	Unreleased	Yes		
BounceBack	Steel Minions	NPEZ00461	Unreleased	September 12, 2009	Unreleased	Unreleased	Yes		
Bowling 3D	MystoneGame Inc.	NPUZ00002	December 22, 2009	December 22, 2009	Unreleased	Unreleased	Yes		
BrainPipe	On Mobile	NPUZ00009	October 1, 2009	October 1, 2009	Unreleased	Unreleased	Yes		
BreakQuest	Beatshapers	NPUZ00031	October 1, 2009	October 1, 2009	Unreleased	Unreleased	No		
BreakQuest: Extra Evolution	Beatshapers	NPUZ00235	October 16, 2012	October 17, 2012	Unreleased	Unreleased			
Brick Breaker	BigBen Interactive	NPUZ00225	June 21, 2011	July 28, 2009	Unreleased	Unreleased	Yes		
Bubble Trubble	Creat Studios	NPUZ00007	November 12, 2009	November 12, 2009	Unreleased	Unreleased	Yes		
Bunny Dodge	Skylon Games	NPUZ00229	June 3, 2011	June 2, 2011	November 24, 2011	Unreleased	Yes		
Burnin' Rubber	G1M2	NPUZ00083	June 22, 2010	Unreleased	Unreleased	Unreleased	Yes		
Busy Sweets Factory	SCEJ	NPUX80449	May 11, 2010	May 26, 2010	August 11, 2010	Unreleased	No		
Canabalt	Semi Secret Software	NPUZ00276	April 3, 2012	March 14, 2012	Unreleased	Unreleased	Yes		
Card Shark	Midas Interactive Entertainment	NPUZ00211	June 1, 2011	November 24, 2009	Unreleased	Unreleased	Yes		
Car Jack Streets	Tag Games	NPUZ00043	April 29, 2010	July 14, 2010	Unreleased	Unreleased	Yes		
Carnivores: Dinosaur Hunter	Beatshapers	NPUZ00118	August 17, 2010	August 11, 2009	Unreleased	Unreleased	Yes		
Carnivores Ice Age	WizardWorks	NPUZ00236	August 30, 2011	August 17, 2009	Unreleased	Unreleased	Yes		
Caterpillar	TikGames	NPUZ00112	September 14, 2010	September 1, 2009	Unreleased	Unreleased	Yes		
Championship Manager 2010 Express	Gusto Games	NPEZ00026	Unreleased	April 29, 2009	Unreleased	Unreleased			
Charge! Tank Squad	SCEJ	NPUX80433	April 22, 2010	May 26, 2010	April 22, 2010	Unreleased	No		
Chopper I	SNK	NPUZ00153	August 21, 2012	Unreleased	Unreleased	Unreleased	Yes	Yes	Yes
Circles, Circles, Circles	Gameshastra	NPUZ00028	November 19, 2009	November 12, 2009	Unreleased	Unreleased	Yes		
Coconut Dodge	FuturLab	NPUZ00131	August 31, 2010	May 5, 2009	Unreleased	Unreleased	Yes		
Cohort Chess	Cohort Studios	NPUZ00250	June 7, 2011	July 6, 2009	Unreleased	Unreleased	Yes		
Core Blaster	Ringzero Game Studio	NPUZ00209	February 15, 2011	December 15, 2010	Unreleased	Unreleased	Yes		
Crime Spree	Skyworks Interactive	NPEZ00136	Unreleased	October 13, 2009	Unreleased	Unreleased			
Cubixx	Laughing Jackal	NPUZ00080	June 8, 2010	December 22, 2009	Unreleased	Unreleased	Yes		
D-Cube Planet	Gameshastra	NPUZ00027	November 19, 2009	November 12, 2009	Unreleased	Unreleased	Yes		
Days of Thunder	Sony Online Entertainment	NPUZ00185	June 1, 2011	Unreleased	Unreleased	Unreleased	No		
Defenders of the Mystic Garden	Twisted Dragon Media	NPUZ00271	April 10, 2012	April 18, 2012	Unreleased	Unreleased			
Deflector	Gameshastra	NPUZ00040	January 28, 2010	January 14, 2010	Unreleased	Unreleased	Yes		
Denki Blocks!	Denki	NPUZ00213	February 22, 2011	January 26, 2011	Unreleased	Unreleased	Yes		
Digi-Tiles	SCEJ	NPUX80407	March 4, 2010	March 4, 2010	May 27, 2010	Unreleased	Yes		
Doodle Fit	Gamelion Studios	NPUZ00263	September 6, 2011	August 24, 2009	Unreleased	Unreleased	Yes		
Doodle Pool	Big Head Games	NPUZ00203	March 22, 2011	March 9, 2011	Unreleased	Unreleased	Yes		
Dr. Maybee and the Adventures of Scarygirl	TikGames	NPUZ00126	August 16, 2011	July 6, 2009	Unreleased	Unreleased	Yes		
Dr. Mini Games	StormBASIC Games	NPUZ00201	December 21, 2010	December 15, 2010	Unreleased	Unreleased	Yes		
Dracula: Undead Awakening	Chillingo	NPUZ00046	January 28, 2010	November 26, 2009	Unreleased	Unreleased	Yes		
Drums Challenge	Sanuk Games	NPUZ00214	June 3, 2011	June 2, 2009	Unreleased	Unreleased	Yes		
Ducati Challenge	Digital Tales	NPUZ00285	February 28, 2012	July 13, 2011	Unreleased	Unreleased	Yes		
Duæl Invaders	Laughing Jackal	NPUZ00212	April 19, 2011	April 20, 2011	Unreleased	Unreleased	Yes		
Dynogems	StormBASIC Games	NPUZ00036	January 14, 2010	December 10, 2009	Unreleased	Unreleased	Yes		
Earthshield	SCEJ	NPUX80405	March 4, 2010	Unreleased	April 22, 2010	Unreleased	Yes		
Echoes	Halfbrick Studios	NPUZ00022	November 19, 2009	November 19, 2009	Unreleased	Unreleased	Yes		
Edge	Mobigame	NPUZ00251	September 20, 2011	December 1, 2009	Unreleased	Unreleased	Yes		
Enchanted Cavern	Alawar	NPUZ00272	November 6, 2012	September 12, 2012	Unreleased	Unreleased			
Enigmo	Beatshapers	NPUZ00197	March 15, 2011	March 16, 2011	Unreleased	Unreleased	Yes		
Express Raider	G1M2	NPUZ00084	June 15, 2010	Unreleased	Unreleased	Unreleased	Yes		
Family Games	Icon Games	NPUZ00180	January 4, 2011	January 5, 2011	Unreleased	Unreleased	Yes		
Farm Frenzy	Alawar	NPUZ00222	April 19, 2011	December 15, 2010	Unreleased	Unreleased	Yes		
Farm Frenzy 2	Alawar	NPUZ00273	April 3, 2012	March 7, 2012	Unreleased	Unreleased	Yes		
Farm Frenzy 3	Alawar	NPUZ00293	August 7, 2012	Unreleased	Unreleased	Unreleased	Yes		
Farm Frenzy: Pizza Party	Alawar	NPUZ00274	June 26, 2012	June 6, 2009	Unreleased	Unreleased	Yes		
Feisty Feet	iSquared Games	NPUZ00306	September 18, 2012	September 26, 2012	Unreleased	Unreleased			
Fieldrunners	Subatomic Studios	NPUZ00014	October 1, 2009	October 1, 2009	Unreleased	Unreleased	Yes		
Fighting Fantasy: Talisman of Death	Laughing Jackal	NPUZ00187	August 23, 2011	August 17, 2009	Unreleased	Unreleased	Yes		
Fighting Fantasy: The Warlock of Firetop Mountain	Laughing Jackal	NPUZ00268	November 1, 2011	November 9, 2011	Unreleased	Unreleased			
Finger Connection	SCEJ	NPUX80423	May 4, 2010	May 26, 2010	May 13, 2010	Unreleased	No		
Fish Tank	iFun4all	NPUZ00204	August 26, 2010	August 18, 2010	Unreleased	Unreleased	Yes		
Flick Fishing	Gameshastra	NPUZ00044	October 26, 2010	October 20, 2009	Unreleased	Unreleased	Yes		
Floating Cloud God Saves the Pilgrims	Dakko Dakko	NPUZ00299	May 1, 2012	April 18, 2012	Unreleased	Unreleased			
Fly Fu	Invictus Games	NPUZ00108	July 20, 2010	August 11, 2009	Unreleased	Unreleased	Yes		
Flying Hamster	The Game Atelier	NPUZ00192	December 7, 2010	September 8, 2010	Unreleased	Unreleased	Yes		
Forest Puzzle	IBA Group	NPUZ00121	December 21, 2010	April 15, 2009	Unreleased	Unreleased			
Fort Commander: King's Gambit	Immersive Games	NPUZ00127	October 5, 2010	August 25, 2009	Unreleased	Unreleased	Yes		
Fort Commander II: Counterattack	Immersive Games	NPUZ00128	November 9, 2010	November 10, 2009	Unreleased	Unreleased	Yes		
Fortix	Nemesys	NPUZ00016	October 1, 2009	October 1, 2009	Unreleased	Unreleased	Yes		
Freekscape: Escape From Hell	Creat Studios	NPUZ00013	April 8, 2010	April 8, 2010	Unreleased	Unreleased	Yes		
Free Shot Frenzy	Gameshastra	NPEZ00191	Unreleased	February 22, 2009	Unreleased	Unreleased			
Funky Punch	Solus Games	NPUZ00011	October 1, 2009	October 1, 2009	Unreleased	Unreleased	Yes		
Future Fight	Bloober Team	NPEZ00189	May 30, 2010	September 29, 2010	Unreleased	Unreleased			
Galcon Labs	Beatshapers	NPUZ00237	September 27, 2011	September 28, 2009	Unreleased	Unreleased	Yes		
Gamocracy One: Legend of Robot	The Bearded Ladies	NPUZ00259	August 16, 2011	July 13, 2009	Unreleased	Unreleased	Yes		
Gang Wars	SNK	NPUZ00155	July 24, 2012	August 8, 2012	Unreleased	Unreleased	Yes	Yes	Yes
Gold Fever	TikGames	NPUZ00093	June 15, 2010	June 9, 2009	Unreleased	Unreleased	Yes		
Gold Medalist	SNK	NPUZ00156	January 24, 2012	March 14, 2012	Unreleased	Unreleased	Yes	Yes	Yes
Golf Mania	Icon Games	NPUZ00282	April 24, 2012	April 4, 2012	Unreleased	Unreleased			
GreenTechPlus	Vertigo Games	NPEZ00299	Unreleased	January 26, 2009	Unreleased	Unreleased			
Guerrilla War	SNK	NPUZ00157	July 19, 2011	September 7, 2009	Unreleased	Unreleased	Yes	Yes	Yes
HAL 21	SNK	NPUZ00136	July 19, 2011	September 7, 2009	Unreleased	Unreleased	Yes	Yes	Yes
Hello Flowerz	Virtual Toys	NPUZ00067	June 29, 2010	June 30, 2009	Unreleased	Unreleased	Yes		
Heracles Chariot Racing	Neko Entertainment	NPUZ00037	December 17, 2009	December 10, 2009	Unreleased	Unreleased	Yes		
Hero of Sparta	Gameloft	NPUZ00005	October 1, 2009	October 1, 2009	January 14, 2010	Unreleased	Yes	Yes	Yes
History Egypt: Engineering an Empire	Slitherine Strategies	NPUZ00090	June 29, 2010	June 2, 2009	Unreleased	Unreleased	Yes		
Hive Sweeper	Skylon Games	NPEZ00214	Unreleased	August 25, 2009	February 24, 2009	Unreleased			
Homerun Hitters	SCEJ	NPUX80420	April 22, 2010	May 26, 2010	April 22, 2010	Unreleased	No		
Hotel Mogul	Alawar	NPUZ00278	December 18, 2012	December 5, 2012	Unreleased	Unreleased			
Hungry Giraffe	Laughing Jackal	NPUZ00286	February 21, 2012	Unreleased	Unreleased	Unreleased			
Hysteria Project	Sanuk Games	NPUZ00072	April 22, 2010	April 15, 2010	Unreleased	Unreleased	Yes	Yes	
Hysteria Project 2	Sanuk Games	NPUZ00255	August 23, 2011	August 10, 2009	Unreleased	Unreleased	Yes		
I Kill Zombies	Open Emotion Studios	NPUZ00305	July 24, 2012	April 4, 2009	Unreleased	Unreleased			
I Must Run!	Gamelion Studios	NPUZ00198	December 14, 2010	December 15, 2010	Unreleased	Unreleased	Yes		
Ice Road Truckers	Slitherine Strategies	NPEZ00145	June 15, 2010	March 11, 2009	Unreleased	Unreleased	Yes		
Idiot Squad	Hydravision Entertainment	NPUZ00279	March 27, 2012	March 28, 2012	Unreleased	Unreleased			
Ikari Warriors	SNK	NPUZ00159	July 19, 2011	September 14, 2009	Unreleased	Unreleased	Yes	Yes	Yes
Ikari Warriors II: Victory Road	SNK	NPUZ00174	November 22, 2011	January 11, 2012	Unreleased	Unreleased	Yes	Yes	Yes
Ikari III: The Rescue	SNK	NPUZ00158	April 24, 2012	April 18, 2012	Unreleased	Unreleased	Yes	Yes	Yes
Influence	Game Workshop	NPUX80453	June 22, 2010	Unreleased	May 27, 2009	Unreleased	Yes		
International Snooker	Big Head Games	NPEZ00104	Unreleased	December 22, 2009	Unreleased	Unreleased			
Jane's Hotel	Realore Studios	NPUZ00196	December 21, 2010	January 12, 2011	Unreleased	Unreleased	Yes		
JellyCar 2	Disney Interactive Studios	NPUZ00076	November 23, 2010	June 15, 2009	Unreleased	Unreleased	Yes		
Jelly Pops	PomPom Games	NPUZ00223	September 27, 2011	September 21, 2009	Unreleased	Unreleased	Yes		
Jetpack Joyride	Halfbrick Studios	NPUZ00292	November 20, 2012	November 21, 2012	Unreleased	Unreleased			
Jewel Keepers: Easter Island	Nordcurrent	NPUZ00081	November 16, 2010	November 10, 2009	Unreleased	Unreleased	Yes		
Kahoots	Honeyslug Ltd	NPUZ00030	November 24, 2009	October 1, 2009	Unreleased	Unreleased	Yes		
Kaleidoscope (Interactive Synaesthesia Project)	iSquared Games	NPUZ00260	June 19, 2012	September 21, 2011	Unreleased	Unreleased			
Karimogi	StormBASIC Games	NPUZ00193	January 18, 2011	February 16, 2011	Unreleased	Unreleased			
Karoshi	YoYo Games	NPEZ00331	Unreleased	April 6, 2011	Unreleased	Unreleased			
Knight Fortix 2	Nemesys	NPUZ00300	May 8, 2012	February 22, 2012	Unreleased	Unreleased	Yes		
Labyrinth	BigBen Interactive	NPUZ00226	June 21, 2011	July 28, 2009	Unreleased	Unreleased	Yes		
L.A. Gridlock	Immersive Games	NPEZ00448	Unreleased	April 11, 2009	Unreleased	Unreleased			
Left to Die in Zombhai	iSquared Games	NPEZ00347	Unreleased	August 31, 2009	Unreleased	Unreleased			
Legend of Kunoichi	SCEJ	NPUX80406	March 4, 2010	Unreleased	June 10, 2010	Unreleased	Yes		
Let's Golf	Gameloft	NPUZ00004	November 24, 2009	December 10, 2009	February 25, 2009	Unreleased	Yes	Yes	
Lock 'n' Chase	G1M2	NPUZ00085	June 8, 2010	Unreleased	Unreleased	Unreleased	Yes		
Love Cupid	SCEJ	NPUX80432	May 11, 2010	May 26, 2010	July 8, 2010	Unreleased	No		
M.O.Z.O.X. Space Salvager	Twisted Dragon Media	NPUZ00199	January 4, 2011	February 2, 2011	Unreleased	Unreleased	Yes		
Mad Blocker Alpha: Revenge of the Fluzzles	Open Emotion Studios	NPUZ00210	April 19, 2011	February 9, 2011	Unreleased	Unreleased	Yes		
Mahjong Solitaire	Agetec	NPUZ00061	June 29, 2010	Unreleased	Unreleased	Unreleased	Yes		
Mahjongg Artifacts	G5 Entertainment	NPUZ00062	June 15, 2010	Unreleased	Unreleased	Unreleased	Yes		
Mahjongg Artifacts: Chapter 2	G5 Entertainment	NPUZ00006	October 22, 2009	October 8, 2009	Unreleased	Unreleased	Yes		
Manic Monkey Mayhem	The Code Monkeys	NPUZ00096	May 18, 2010	March 25, 2010	Unreleased	Unreleased	Yes		
Marvin's Maze	SNK	NPUZ00141	July 19, 2011	September 7, 2009	Unreleased	Unreleased	Yes	Yes	Yes
Mecho Wars	Creat Studios	NPUZ00232	January 10, 2012	January 25, 2012	Unreleased	Unreleased			
Me Monstar: Hear Me Roar!	Cohort Studios	NPUZ00231	July 19, 2011	July 6, 2011	Unreleased	Unreleased	Yes		
MENA Speed	Quirkat	NPEZ00356	November 15, 2011	November 16, 2011	Unreleased	Unreleased			
Metara	PlaygroundSquad	NPEZ00313	Unreleased	January 19, 2009	Unreleased	Unreleased			
Mighty Flip Champs! DX	WayForward Technologies	NPUZ00238	July 12, 2011	Unreleased	Unreleased	Unreleased	Yes	Yes	
MiniSquadron	Grip Games/Supermono studios	NPUZ00122	March 22, 2011	March 16, 2011	Unreleased	Unreleased	Yes		
Monochrome Racing	Nordcurrent	NPUZ00221	August 2, 2011	August 3, 2011	Unreleased	Unreleased	Yes		
Monopoly	EA Mobile	NPUZ00033	April 15, 2010	April 15, 2010	Unreleased	Unreleased	Yes		
Monsters (Probably) Stole My Princess	Mediatonic	NPUZ00057	April 22, 2010	April 22, 2010	Unreleased	Unreleased	Yes		
Mots Croisés (Note: Only released in Belgium, France, Luxembourg and Switzerland.)	BigBen Interactive	NPEZ00128	Unreleased	January 7, 2009	Unreleased	Unreleased			
Mr. Hat and the Magic Cube	Bravo Game Studios	NPEZ00348	Unreleased	March 30, 2009	Unreleased	Unreleased			
Music Quiz	SCEJ	NPUX80438	April 29, 2010	Unreleased	August 11, 2010	Unreleased	No		
N.O.V.A. Near Orbit Vanguard Alliance	Gameloft	NPUZ00179	December 21, 2010	December 22, 2010	Unreleased	Unreleased	Yes		
Ninjamurai	Open Emotion Studios	NPUZ00253	July 5, 2011	June 8, 2009	Unreleased	Unreleased	Yes		
Nocturnal	Gameshastra	NPEZ00300	Unreleased	October 12, 2009	Unreleased	Unreleased			
Nom Nation	Playerthree	NPEZ00445	Unreleased	May 16, 2009	Unreleased	Unreleased			
NormalTanks	Beatshapers	NPUZ00071	April 29, 2010	March 18, 2010	Unreleased	Unreleased	Yes		
Numba	Cobra Mobile	NPEZ00080	Unreleased	June 2, 2009	Unreleased	Unreleased			
OMG-Z	Laughing Jackal	NPUZ00217	August 16, 2011	August 3, 2011	Unreleased	Unreleased	Yes		
One Epic Game	Grip Games	NPUZ00205	August 2, 2011	July 20, 2009	Unreleased	Unreleased	Yes		
One Two Boat Racing	SCEJ	NPUX80431	May 4, 2010	May 26, 2010	June 10, 2010	Unreleased	No		
Orbit	Laughing Jackal	NPUZ00216	December 20, 2011	November 9, 2011	Unreleased	Unreleased	Yes		
Ozma Wars	SNK	NPUZ00143	July 19, 2011	September 7, 2011	Unreleased	Unreleased	Yes	Yes	Yes
P.O.W.: Prisoners of War	SNK	NPUZ00160	December 20, 2011	January 18, 2012	Unreleased	Unreleased	Yes	Yes	Yes
Pac-Man Championship Edition	Bandai Namco Entertainment	NPUZ00125	February 1, 2011	December 1, 2010	Unreleased	Unreleased	Yes	No	No
Pachisi	Gameshastra	NPEZ00123	Unreleased	December 17, 2009	Unreleased	Unreleased			
Pallurikio	Playstos	NPUZ00099	June 15, 2010	July 14, 2009	Unreleased	Unreleased	Yes		
Panda Craze	TikGames	NPUZ00113	September 14, 2010	September 15, 2009	Unreleased	Unreleased	Yes		
Paper Wars: Cannon Fodder	iFun4all	NPUZ00206	February 22, 2011	September 1, 2010	Unreleased	Unreleased	Yes		
Pile Up! Bakery	SCEJ	NPUX80448	April 29, 2010	May 26, 2010	July 8, 2010	Unreleased	No		
Pinball Dreams	Rebellion Developments	NPUZ00054	January 28, 2010	November 19, 2009	Unreleased	Unreleased	Yes		
Pinball Duel	SCEJ	NPUX80435	April 29, 2010	May 26, 2010	June 10, 2010	Unreleased	No		
Pinball Fantasies	Cowboy Rodeo	NPUZ00017	October 1, 2009	October 1, 2009	Unreleased	Unreleased	Yes		
Pipe Madness	Ayeware AB	NPUZ00195	January 18, 2011	January 19, 2011	Unreleased	Unreleased	Yes		
Pix'n Love Rush	BulkyPix	NPUZ00177	March 15, 2011	March 16, 2011	Unreleased	Unreleased	Yes		
Prehistoric Isle	SNK	NPUZ00162	December 20, 2011	February 1, 2012	Unreleased	Unreleased	Yes	Yes	Yes
Psycho Soldier	SNK	NPUZ00163	November 22, 2011	January 11, 2012	Unreleased	Unreleased	Yes	Yes	Yes
Puzzle Scape Mini	Farmind Ltd	NPEZ00001	October 1, 2009	October 1, 2009	Unreleased	Unreleased			
Quiz Animania	SCEJ	NPUX80436	May 11, 2010	Unreleased	May 13, 2010	Unreleased	No		
Ramen Heaven	SCEJ	NPUX80434	May 4, 2010	May 26, 2010	July 8, 2010	Unreleased	No		
Rasmus Klump and the Big Maze	Nordisk Film Games Publishing	NPEZ00388	Unreleased	May 16, 2012	Unreleased	Unreleased	No		
Rasmus Klump in Pingonisen	Nordisk Film Games Publishing	NPEZ00387	Unreleased	May 30, 2012	Unreleased	Unreleased	No		
Rasmus Klump is Saving the Chickens	Nordisk Film Games Publishing	NPEZ00386	Unreleased	February 18, 2009	Unreleased	Unreleased			
Red Bull X-Fighters	Play	NPUZ00048	June 15, 2010	October 22, 2009	Unreleased	Unreleased	Yes		
Reef Aquarium	Biart Studio	NPUZ00064	April 29, 2010	March 14, 2010	Unreleased	Unreleased	Yes		
Retro Cave Flyer	Big Head Games	NPUZ00060	February 25, 2010	February 18, 2010	Unreleased	Unreleased	Yes		
Revoltin' Youth	Open Emotion Studios	NPUZ00264	September 27, 2011	August 24, 2009	Unreleased	Unreleased	Yes		
Robin Hood: The Return of Richard	Nordcurrent	NPUZ00075	May 25, 2010	May 26, 2010	Unreleased	Unreleased	Yes		
Rocks N' Rockets	Creat Studios	NPUZ00094	June 15, 2010	June 9, 2009	Unreleased	Unreleased	Yes		
Ronnie O'Sullivan's Snooker	P1 Sports Ltd	NPUZ00265	September 11, 2012	October 3, 2012	Unreleased	Unreleased			
Route 66	Gameshastra	NPUZ00041	January 28, 2010	December 17, 2010	Unreleased	Unreleased	Yes		
Rumble Trucks	Playerthree	NPUZ00219	November 15, 2011	November 16, 2011	Unreleased	Unreleased	Yes		
Run Ghost Run	StormBASIC Games	NPUZ00242	June 14, 2011	June 15, 2011	Unreleased	Unreleased	Yes		
SAR: Search and Rescue	SNK	NPUZ00170	March 20, 2012	April 18, 2012	Unreleased	Unreleased	Yes	Yes	Yes
Sasuke vs. Commander	SNK	NPUZ00146	July 19, 2011	September 7, 2011	Unreleased	Unreleased	Yes	No	No
Shapo	TikGames	NPUZ00111	October 5, 2010	December 15, 2009	Unreleased	Unreleased	Yes		
Sheep Defense	SCEJ	NPUX80421	April 15, 2010	May 26, 2010	July 8, 2010	Unreleased	No		
Shift Extended	Zallag	NPUZ00200	January 18, 2011	January 19, 2011	Unreleased	Unreleased	Yes		
Shogi	SCEJ	NPUX80439	April 22, 2010	Unreleased	April 22, 2010	Unreleased	No		
Sky Force	Infinite Dreams	NPUZ00239	June 1, 2011	January 5, 2011	Unreleased	Unreleased	Yes		
Smashbreak	SCEJ	NPUX80404	March 4, 2010	March 4, 2010	July 7, 2010	Unreleased	Yes		
Snake Warriors: Training	Crystal Games	NPUZ00207	April 19, 2011	June 2, 2010	Unreleased	Unreleased	Yes		
Sneezies	Chillingo	NPUZ00065	May 4, 2010	June 9, 2010	Unreleased	Unreleased	Yes		
Snowy: The Bear's Adventures	Game-Remakes	NPUZ00257	August 30, 2011	August 31, 2011	Unreleased	Unreleased	Yes	Yes	
Soccer Bashi	Icon Games	NPUZ00123	February 15, 2011	January 19, 2011	Unreleased	Unreleased	Yes		
Solitaire	BigBen Interactive	NPUZ00227	June 21, 2011	August 4, 2010	Unreleased	Unreleased	Yes		
Spaceball Revolution	Virtual Toys	NPUZ00038	February 11, 2010	February 4, 2010	Unreleased	Unreleased	Yes		
Speedball 2: Evolution	Vivid Games	NPUZ00256	October 18, 2011	October 5, 2011	Unreleased	Unreleased			
Spot the Differences!	Sanuk Games	NPUZ00034	December 17, 2009	November 5, 2009	Unreleased	Unreleased	Yes		
Stand O' Food	G5 Entertainment	NPUZ00029	December 10, 2009	December 3, 2009	Unreleased	Unreleased	Yes		
Star Hammer Tactics	Black Lab Games	NPUZ00230	June 1, 2011	July 14, 2010	Unreleased	Unreleased	Yes		
Stellar Attack	Laughing Jackal	NPUZ00092	June 29, 2010	April 15, 2010	Unreleased	Unreleased	Yes		
Stick Man Rescue	TikGames	NPUZ00234	January 24, 2012	January 18, 2012	Unreleased	Unreleased			
Street Smart	SNK	NPUZ00172	October 18, 2011	October 5, 2011	Unreleased	Unreleased	Yes	Yes	Yes
Sudoku	EA Mobile	NPUZ00001	October 1, 2009	October 8, 2009	Unreleased	Unreleased	No		
Supermarket Mania	G5 Entertainment	NPUZ00058	May 18, 2010	May 26, 2010	Unreleased	Unreleased	Yes		
Swap Zap	PlaygroundSquad	NPEZ00179	Unreleased	February 16, 2009	Unreleased	Unreleased			
Sweet Reversi	SCEJ	NPUX80424	April 15, 2010	May 26, 2010	May 13, 2010	Unreleased	Yes		
Tehra: Dark Warrior	StormBASIC Games	NPUZ00049	June 15, 2010	June 2, 2009	Unreleased	Unreleased	Yes		
Telegraph Crosswords	Sanuk Games	NPUZ00073	June 1, 2010	December 10, 2009	Unreleased	Unreleased	Yes		
Telegraph Sudoku & Kakuro	Sanuk Games	NPUZ00074	April 15, 2010	February 18, 2010	Unreleased	Unreleased	Yes		
Tetrominos	BigBen Interactive	NPUZ00228	June 28, 2011	July 28, 2011	Unreleased	Unreleased	Yes		
Tetris	EA Mobile	NPUZ00003	October 1, 2009	October 1, 2009	November 1, 2009	Unreleased	No		
The 2D Adventures of Rotating Octopus Character	Dakko Dakko	NPUZ00240	June 14, 2011	June 15, 2011	Unreleased	Unreleased	Yes		
The Impossible Game	Grip Games	NPUZ00254	September 6, 2011	September 7, 2011	Unreleased	Unreleased	Yes	Yes	
The Marbians	Nordisk Film Games Publishing	NPUZ00280	December 13, 2011	October 5, 2011	Unreleased	Unreleased			
The Mystery of the Crystal Portal	Artogon	NPUZ00063	July 6, 2010	June 30, 2009	Unreleased	Unreleased	Yes		
The Next Space	SNK	NPUZ00169	August 21, 2012	August 15, 2012	Unreleased	Unreleased	Yes	No	No
The Terminator	Big Head Games	NPUZ00056	February 25, 2010	February 11, 2010	Unreleased	Unreleased	Yes		
The Treasures of Montezuma	Alawar	NPUZ00269	October 18, 2011	September 28, 2011	Unreleased	Unreleased		Yes	
This is Football Management	Sports Director Ltd.	NPEX00001	Unreleased	February 11, 2009	Unreleased	Unreleased			
Tiger Trouble	Gameshastra	NPEZ00129	Unreleased	December 22, 2009	Unreleased	Unreleased			
Time Soldiers	SNK	NPUZ00173	July 24, 2012	August 1, 2012	Unreleased	Unreleased	Yes	Yes	Yes
Tiny Hawk	Polygon Toys	NPEZ00434	Unreleased	January 4, 2009	Unreleased	Unreleased			
TNK III	SNK	NPUZ00147	September 6, 2011	February 8, 2012	Unreleased	Unreleased	Yes	Yes	Yes
Tonzurakko	SCEJ	NPUX80422	April 15, 2010	May 26, 2010	April 22, 2010	Unreleased	No		
Top Gun	Paramount Digital Entertainment	NPUZ00184	June 1, 2011	Unreleased	Unreleased	Unreleased	No		
Top Trumps: NBA All Stars	Ideas Pad	NPUZ00301	August 21, 2012	June 13, 2012	Unreleased	Unreleased			
Touch Racing Nitro	Bravo Game Studios	NPEZ00350	Unreleased	March 23, 2011	Unreleased	Unreleased			
Touchdown Fever	SNK	NPUZ00166	February 21, 2012	March 28, 2012	Unreleased	Unreleased	Yes	Yes	Yes
Trailblazer	Ideas Pad	NPUZ00294	February 28, 2012	January 11, 2012	Unreleased	Unreleased			
Twin Blades	Sanuk Games	NPUZ00188	February 22, 2011	February 2, 2011	Unreleased	Unreleased	Yes		
Urbanix	Nordcurrent	NPUZ00077	October 5, 2010	October 6, 2009	July 6, 2009	Unreleased	Yes		
Vanguard	SNK	NPUZ00148	July 19, 2011	September 7, 2011	Unreleased	Unreleased	Yes	Yes	Yes
Vanguard II	SNK	NPUZ00149	September 6, 2011	February 8, 2012	Unreleased	Unreleased	Yes	Yes	Yes
Vector TD	Candystand	NPUZ00066	March 4, 2010	January 21, 2010	Unreleased	Unreleased	Yes		
Velocity	FuturLab	NPUZ00252	May 15, 2012	May 2, 2012	Unreleased	Unreleased	Yes		
Vempire	Impressionware	NPUZ00015	October 1, 2009	October 1, 2009	Unreleased	Unreleased	Yes		
Vibes	Laughing Jackal	NPUZ00095	June 8, 2010	June 9, 2009	Unreleased	Unreleased	Yes		
VT Tennis	Virtual Toys	NPUZ00068	May 25, 2010	May 26, 2010	Unreleased	Unreleased	Yes		
Wackylands Boss	Chillingo	NPUZ00042	February 1, 2011	March 2, 2011	Unreleased	Unreleased	Yes		
War of Sonria	PlaygroundSquad	NPEZ00463	Unreleased	December 12, 2012	Unreleased	Unreleased			
Where is my Heart?	Copenhagen Game Collective	NPUZ00243	November 22, 2011	November 16, 2011	Unreleased	Unreleased	Yes		
Who's That Flying?!	Mediatonic	NPUZ00129	November 16, 2010	November 17, 2009	Unreleased	Unreleased	Yes		
Widget's Odyssey	Frima Studio	NPUZ00045	July 6, 2010	June 16, 2009	Unreleased	Unreleased	Yes		
Widget's Odyssey 2	Frima Studio	NPUZ00055	August 3, 2010	August 4, 2009	Unreleased	Unreleased	Yes		
Wizorb	Tribute Games	NPUZ00296	July 24, 2012	July 25, 2012	Unreleased	Unreleased	Yes		
World Ping Pong Championship	Gameshastra	NPEZ00190	Unreleased	February 15, 2012	Unreleased	Unreleased			
Yetisports: Pingu Throw	Xendex	NPUZ00047	June 15, 2010	October 15, 2009	Unreleased	Unreleased	Yes		
Young Thor	Frima Studio	NPUZ00052	July 20, 2010	July 21, 2010	November 25, 2010	Unreleased	Yes		
Yummy Yummy Cooking Jam	Virtual Toys	NPUZ00018	October 29, 2009	October 8, 2009	Unreleased	2015	Yes		
Zenonia	Gamevil	NPUZ00132	October 12, 2010	February 16, 2009	Unreleased	Unreleased	Yes		
Zombie Racers	Big Head Games	NPUZ00208	June 7, 2011	June 2, 2011	Unreleased	Unreleased	Yes		
Zombie Tycoon	Frima Studio	NPUZ00025	October 29, 2009	October 29, 2009	Unreleased	Unreleased	Yes	Yes	

== See also ==
- List of DSiWare games and applications
