= MiniSquadron =

2009 video game

- Developers: Supermono Studios (iOS, PSP, PS3); Gray Fin Studios (Android, BlackBerry); MrFungFung (Windows Mobile); Advanced Mobile Application (Ouya)
- Publishers: Supermono Studios (iOS, PSP, PS3); Gray Fin Studios (Android, BlackBerry); MrFungFung (Windows Mobile); Advanced Mobile Application (Ouya)
- Platforms: iOS, Android, PlayStation Portable, PlayStation 3, Windows Mobile, Ouya, BlackBerry
- Release: November 18, 2009: iOS November 18, 2009 Android November 23, 2010 PlayStation Portable, PlayStation 3; EU: March 16, 2011; NA: March 22, 2011 Windows Mobile November 19, 2011 Ouya April 30, 2013 BlackBerry May 27, 2013

MiniSquadron is a video game developed by Supermono Studios, Gray Fin Studios, MrFungFung, and Advanced Mobile Application. It is a plane-based shooter game. Players can unlock multiple planes and battle with them.

== Critical reception ==
Reception

Aggregate score
Aggregator	Score	
Aggregator	iOS	PSP
Metacritic	87/100	57/100

Review scores
Publication	Score	
Publication	iOS	PSP
Eurogamer	8/10	N/A
GamesMaster	N/A	40%
Macworld	3.5/5	N/A
PlayStation Official Magazine – UK	N/A	6/10
Pocket Gamer	4/5	3.5/5
Push Square	N/A	5/10
TouchArcade	4/5	N/A

The iPhone version received "generally favorable reviews", while the PSP version received "mixed" reviews, according to the review aggregation website Metacritic.

Christian Donlan of Eurogamer called the iPhone version "a simple game [...] but an extremely polished and engaging one." Kristan Reed later said of the Android version, "Every bit as polished as the original, MiniSquadron is another sure sign of Android hitting its stride, and easily one of the best titles available right now." Jon Mundy of Pocket Gamer said that the iOS version "Offers the pick-up-and-playability of the old skool shooter, combined with great graphics and surprising deep gameplay." Joao Diniz Sanches later said that the PSP version "successfully lands on the Minis runway carrying its trademark intense and engaging flight combat frolics but misses an opportunity to deliver a little more content-related freight."

The iPhone version was nominated for the "Best Mobile Game Design" award at the Independent Games Festival Mobile 2010 Awards, which went to Glow Artisan.
