= Fishtank (disambiguation) =

A fishtank is a container housing fish.

Fishtank or Fish Tank may also refer to:

- Fishtank (web series), by Sam Hyde
- Fish Tank (video game)
- Fish Tank (film), directed by Andrea Arnold
- Fishtank Ensemble, a musical group
- Fishtank Interactive, a game company
