= Cubixx HD =

2011 video game

- Developer: Laughing Jackal
- Publishers: Laughing Jackal; Ghostlight (PC)
- Platforms: PlayStation 3, Microsoft Windows
- Release: PlayStation 3: NA: September 20, 2011; EU: August 17, 2011; Microsoft Windows: WW: January 28, 2016
- Genre: Puzzle
- Modes: Single-player, multiplayer

Cubixx HD is a puzzle game developed by UK-based studio Laughing Jackal released on the PlayStation Network in Europe on August 17, 2011 and September 20 in North America. It is the HD sequel to Cubixx, a 2009 PlayStation mini title.

== Gameplay ==
The gameplay of Cubixx HD is based upon the classic arcade game Qix. The player controls a robot that fires a laser at a cube with the objective of erasing its sides. A variety of enemies and power-ups become available as the player progresses.

== Reception ==
Reviews of Cubixx HD have been generally favorable with a Metacritic score of 77 out of 100. Kristan Reed of Eurogamer praised the title as the best reinvention of its antecedent Qix, while Joel Gregory of PlayStation Official Magazine (UK) called it "addictive", but frustrating strategy game for PSN.
