= Karoshi (disambiguation) =

Karoshi is a form of death from overwork especially prominent in Japan.

Karoshi may also refer to:

- Karoshi, the former name of The Linux Schools Project, an operating system designed for schools
- "Karoshi" (song), a 1994 song by Pitchblende
- Karoshi (video game), a series of puzzle platform games
- Karoshi (film), an upcoming American action thriller film
