= A Space Shooter for 2 Bucks! =

2010 video game

- Developer: Frima Studio
- Publisher: Frima Studio
- Platforms: PlayStation Portable, PlayStation 3, iOS, Android, Browser, PlayStation Vita, Ouya
- Release: PlayStation Portable, PlayStation 3: NA: December 21, 2010; EU: December 22, 2010; iOS; August 4, 2011; Android; 2011; Browser; March 17, 2012; PS Vita; 2012; Ouya; March 27, 2013
- Genre: Shooter
- Mode: Single-player

A Space Shooter for 2 Bucks!, known as A Space Shooter for Free in some versions, is a vertically scrolling arcade shooter game developed and published by Frima Studio for PlayStation Portable and PlayStation 3 in 2010, for iOS and Android in 2011, for browser and PlayStation Vita in 2012, and for Ouya in 2013.

== Gameplay ==
The game's 16 stages are split into two eight-stage zones. The stages within those zones can be selected and completed in any order. Some stages are supportive stages with standard bosses, but other stages inhabited by the game's primary bad guys. Each stage serves its own purpose: defeating the supportive stages will upgrade your ship and make it defensively stronger, while taking out each of the game's bad guys will give you their special weapon to use during future stages.

== Reception ==
Reception

Aggregate score
Aggregator	Score
Metacritic	(PSP) 81/100 (iOS) 75/100

Review scores
Publication	Score
Destructoid	(PSP) 8/10
Eurogamer	(PSP) 8/10
GamesMaster	(PSP) 86%
GamesRadar+	(PSP)
IGN	(PSP) 9/10
Play	(PSP) 55%
Pocket Gamer	(AND)
Push Square	(PSP)
TouchArcade	(iOS)

The PSP and iOS versions received "favorable" reviews according to the review aggregation website Metacritic.
