= Geometry Dash =

2013 video game

- Developer: Robert Topala
- Publisher: RobTop Games
- Engine: Cocos2d-x
- Platforms: iOS, Android, Windows Phone, PC
- Release: iOS, Android; 13 August 2013; Windows Phone; 12 June 2014; PC; 22 December 2014
- Genres: Platform, rhythm
- Modes: Single-player, multiplayer

Geometry Dash (Note: Abbreviated as GD or GMD) is a 2013 rhythm video game developed by Swedish game developer Robert Topala and published by his company RobTop Games. The player controls an icon and must navigate through levels while avoiding obstacles. Geometry Dash includes 26 developer-made levels: 22 are auto-scrolling, and 4 are platformer levels. It also includes a level editor, enabling players to design custom levels, share them online, and play levels created by other users.

Topala released his first game, Bounce Ball Thingy, on Newgrounds in 2010. As he continued to develop games, he quit his civil engineering course to pursue his new career, working on a handful of games prior to Geometry Dash. He began development in early 2013, being inspired by other platformers such as Super Mario Bros. and The Impossible Game. He released Geometry Dash in August to iOS and Android, and later to Windows Phone in June 2014 and Steam in December 2014. Geometry Dash has been continuously updated with new gameplay elements, levels, and other features.

Geometry Dash has received mostly positive reviews from critics, highlighting the music and visuals, although the difficulty of the gameplay drew some criticism. It became a commercial success, with it and its free version, Geometry Dash Lite, receiving over a billion mobile downloads combined. Topala has released three spin-off games that accompany the main game: Geometry Dash Meltdown, Geometry Dash World and Geometry Dash SubZero, which feature their own levels.

== Gameplay ==
The beginning of Electroman Adventures, the 13th level

Geometry Dash is a side-scrolling platformer. The player takes control of an icon and must navigate through levels until reaching the end. Classic gameplay uses an auto-scrolling camera, requiring the player to use a single button to complete each level. The level restarts from the beginning if the player collides with an obstacle. A practice mode option allows the player to place checkpoints that can be restarted from. In platformer mode, players can move left or right without the auto-scrolling camera and can access preset checkpoints without using practice mode.

Various gameplay elements can affect the movement of the player's icon. Jump Orbs allow the player to gain extra height mid-air. Speed changers affect how fast the icon moves. Portals allow the player to teleport, switch the direction of gameplay, and change their gravity, size, or game mode. Some game modes, known as vehicles, change the form of motion of the icon: for example, the Swing game mode allows the player to move in an arc, while the Ship and Jetpack allow the player to hover in midair. Of these nine total game modes, the Jetpack is the only one exclusive to platformer mode. The Dual game mode duplicates the icon, allowing the player to control two icons at once. In Two-Player mode, the duplicated icons can be controlled separately.

Each level has an accompanying song. The player's timing and rhythm are crucial; the music often synchronizes with a level's gameplay and design elements. Geometry Dash includes 26 developer-made levels, four of which are platformers located in a special section called "The Tower". Each is assigned one of six difficulties: "Easy", "Normal", "Hard", "Harder", "Insane", and "Demon". Levels contains three secret coins, requiring the player to take an alternate pathway or complete a task to obtain them. The player must obtain a certain number of secret coins before the Demon levels can be played.

There are several collectibles and currencies that can be obtained in various ways. Completing levels will unlock icon customizations; classic levels further award the player with stars and platformers with moons. Levels will also award mana orbs, 500 of which will award a Demon Key. Demon Keys are used to unlock chests in the Treasure Room, which will give rewards such as mana orbs, diamonds, and icon designs. There are also two daily chests which award diamonds, mana orbs, and Demon Keys. Mana orbs and diamonds can be used in shops to purchase icon designs and other cosmetics. Vaults can be unlocked after obtaining certain amounts of collectibles, in which entering codes can award further secret coins and cosmetics.

=== User-generated content ===
Geometry Dash features the ability to upload and play user-made levels. These may use songs from the developer levels or feature tracks imported from Newgrounds, 10 selected artists as well as music from the British record label NoCopyrightSounds. Certain user levels are featured in collections known as "Gauntlets" and "Map Packs", or individually as "Daily Levels", "Weekly Demons", or "Event Levels". These will reward players additional currencies upon completion. Some user levels also contain user (silver) coins, which are collected similarly to secret coins. User levels may be rated one of the six difficulties the developer levels have, or given the "Auto" difficulty if user input is not required to complete the level. User-made Demons are divided into five additional difficulties: "Easy Demon", "Medium Demon", "Hard Demon", "Insane Demon", and "Extreme Demon".

Through the level editor, players have created over 150 million online levels. (Note: Based on the most recent in-game level ID values.) Some players have recreated other video games within the level editor, including Super Mario Kart, Five Nights at Freddy's, and Celeste. Some parts of the community are dedicated to making levels as difficult as possible. The community maintains a list of the 150 hardest demon levels in Geometry Dash (known as the "Demonlist"), which is regularly updated. The verification and completion of these levels are inspected by the list's moderators to ensure that they are not done illegitimately.

== Development ==
Geometry Dash was created by Swedish video game developer Robert Topala. In 2010, Topala published his first video game, Bounce Ball Thingy, on Newgrounds, developing it while he was studying civil engineering. He abandoned his course as he became more interested in the video game industry. Topala operated Rune Digital with Niklas Dennerståhl and Daniel Rocque Bengtsson, developing the video games Forlorn and Kingdom Escape. Both were nominees for the Swedish Game Awards in 2012 and 2013 respectively. Forlorn won the title Best Mobile Game, but it and Kingdom Escape were never published. By May 2012, Topala had founded RobTop Games, releasing Boomlings, a puzzle video game made for iOS. Topala released Memory Mastermind in January 2013 and Boomlings MatchUp in February 2013.

Topala only saw modest success with his previous works and was not able to retain a large playerbase. He wanted his next game to be more similar to other platformers he admired, such as the Super Mario Bros.–style games he played in his youth and more recent titles like The Impossible Game, Super Meat Boy, and Bit.Trip Runner. Development began on his new game, first called Geometry Jump, around April 2013, beginning as a prototype of a cube that could jump and crash that was progressively built upon. Instead of optimizing for monetization as he did with his other games, he prioritized the user-experience to increase retention. The official trailer for Geometry Dash was published on 2 August 2013, releasing on iOS and Android on 13 August. (Note: The official trailer on YouTube states the release date for iOS and Android as 13 August 2013. A review on 148Apps published on 14 August states that it was available on both platforms.) It later released on Windows Phone and Steam on 12 June and 22 December 2014 respectively.

=== Post-release ===
Geometry Dash has received several updates since release. In November 2014, update 1.9 was released which introduced the Wave game mode, the levels Theory of Everything 2 and Blast Processing, and the ability to use songs uploaded to Newgrounds. (Note: There were multiple updates that introduced several other features prior to update 1.9. The summaries of the updates mentioned in the article are not comprehensive.) In August 2015, update 2.0 introduced the user coin system, teleportation portals, the Robot game mode, the levels Geometrical Dominator and Deadlocked, and moving objects. In January 2017, update 2.1 introduced the Spider game mode and the level Fingerdash. Topala had planned to release the next update, update 2.2, by several dates including Christmas 2020 and the end of 2022, but would repeatedly be delayed. In August 2023, Topala hosted a YouTube livestream celebrating the 10-year anniversary of Geometry Dash which revealed the release date to be in October of that year, but was delayed again, with 2.2 being released on 19 December 2023. It introduced the Swing and Jetpack game modes, the classic level Dash, and platformer mode with four platformer levels. From February to April 2024, 10 artists' songs were added to the in-game music library, and in June, Topala partnered with NoCopyrightSounds to add their music to Geometry Dash.

== Other games ==
Release timeline
2013	Geometry Dash
2013	Geometry Dash Lite
2014
2015	Geometry Dash Meltdown
2016	Geometry Dash World
2017	Geometry Dash SubZero

=== Geometry Dash Lite ===
Geometry Dash Lite is a free version released on 12 September 2013. Lite includes most of the levels in the original game and selected collections of user levels. It removes some online features, such as the level editor, and access to some unlockable content.

=== Spin-offs ===
In November 2015, Topala posted a teaser on Twitter about a "secret project" he had been working on called Geometry Dash Meltdown. It released on 19 December and includes three levels. Topala released his second spin-off, Geometry Dash World, which contains ten levels, on 21 December 2016, and Geometry Dash SubZero, with three levels, on 21 December 2017. All released for mobile, they serve as free extensions or expansions to the main game, each featuring their own exclusive levels.

== Reception ==
Reception

Review scores
Publication	Score
Jeuxvideo.com	18/20
148Apps	4/5
Common Sense Media	3/5
Softpedia	8.5/10

Geometry Dash's visuals and music have been praised. Matt Purslow at PCGamesN considered the music to be a high point of the game. Andrei Dobra at Softpedia praised the animations and vibrant colors, finding the music, though at times repetitive, to be phenomenal and a complement to the visuals. Jeuxvideo considered the first few levels to be bland-looking but the later levels to be works of art, also enjoying the integration of the songs into the level design.

The gameplay was met with mixed regards. Its difficulty has been criticized, with Chris Morris at Common Sense Media describing it as "maddening", and Dobra and Jeuxvideo finding Geometry Dash potentially too hard for some players to enjoy. Pocket Gamer listed it among the hardest mobile games. Rob Rich at 148Apps saw the gameplay as potentially irritating, although argued that the game was rewarding enough to make the experience worthwhile. Dobra similarly expressed that the gameplay can feel too difficult at times, but that it never felt unfair.

=== Sales ===
Geometry Dash quickly gained popularity after its release. In June 2014 it had become the most popular paid iPhone app in Canada, with the free and paid versions reaching a combined 20 million downloads. It topped the paid iPhone games charts for three weeks in January 2015, and by February Topala reported it had reached nearly 80 million downloads. By September 2018, the mobile version had earned an estimated US$21 million in revenue and received 242 million downloads. In 2019 Breakit reported that RobTop Games had earned kr 75,200,000 in profit the previous year and a total profit of kr 313,000,000 for the previous four. By June 2024, the mobile downloads across all versions exceeded 1.1 billion.

The number of concurrent players on Steam reached over 9,500 after the release of update 2.1 in January 2017, and in March 2020 began rising steadily, reaching peaks of 15,000 in 2021 and 16,000 in 2022. Geometry Dash saw a particular spike in popularity after the release of update 2.2 in December 2023, with over 88,000 concurrent Steam players. This record was broken during a sale in December 2025, reaching over 92,000 concurrent players, and again in January 2026, when the concurrent player count reached over 100,000.
