= Young Thor =

2010 video game

- Japanese box art
- Developer: Frima Studio
- Publisher: Frima Studio
- Platforms: PlayStation Portable, PlayStation 3
- Release: NA: July 20, 2010; EU: July 21, 2010; JP: November 25, 2010
- Genre: Action-adventure
- Mode: Single-player

Young Thor is a 2010 action-adventure video game developed by Frima Studios for the PlayStation 3 and PlayStation Portable. Like Zombie Tycoon, it was produced with the participation of Telefilm Canada. It was released as a downloadable PlayStation Network title. Young Thor is about the childhood of the eponymous Norse god, Thor, as he embarks on a quest to save the world tree, Yggdrasil. The game was met with mixed or average reviews from critics upon release.

== Gameplay ==
Thor battles one of the bosses from the game, Nidhogg, using his Mjolnir hammer and lightning magic

The game is a side-scroller beat 'em up and is broken up into four levels. Players control the Norse god Thor and unleash his lightning magic and powerful hammer, Mjölnir, to blast any foes in his way. As the game progresses, Thor gains XP which increases his character stats; however, the stats are not customizable, leading Joystiq to comment, "leveling seems to exist for the sole purpose of encouraging replays. Somebody out there will want to achieve a level 100 character, right?" Each level introduces new types of enemies and new complicated platform layouts. Treasures are hidden in certain levels which, if found, grant Thor powers such as extra health and magic regeneration, or the ability to double jump. Levels must be repeated multiple times both to find the treasures and to gain enough experience to defeat tougher enemies in later levels. To explain the Norse mythology present in the game, as the game progresses players unlock dictionary entries which can be accessed through the extras section of the game's menu.

== Plot ==
The game follows the Norse god Thor as he travels through Midgard and Asgard on a quest to restore balance to the world. The three Norns charged with keeping the world tree Yggdrasil – Urd, Skuld, and Verdandi – are being held captive by Hel and her two accomplices Níðhöggr and Ratatoskr. Yggdrasil will die if the Norns do not return, and with its death Hel will gain great power. Thor thus embarks on a quest to find eight godly artifacts that will help him defeat the captors and rescue the Norns.

== Development ==
Young Thor is the second PlayStation Portable mini developed by Frima Studio, the first being Zombie Tycoon released on October 29, 2009. The game was shown at the Sony Computer Entertainment Europe booth at E3 2010, a video game trade fair held in Los Angeles, California in June 2010. Young Thor was released in the PlayStation Store on July 20, 2010. In November 2010, Sony created a "Western Game Buyer Selection" on the PlayStation Network in Japan to offer Western-developed digitally distributed games to the Japanese market. Young Thor was translated and localized for Japanese players, and was among the first three games to be released in this section of the PlayStation Network.

== Reception ==
Reception

Aggregate score
Aggregator	Score
Metacritic	71 / 100

Review scores
Publication	Score
1Up.com	(PS3) B−
GamePro	2.5/5
GamesRadar+	2.5/5
Joystiq	4/5
Push Square	7/10

Young Thor received "mixed or average reviews" according to the review aggregation website Metacritic. Joystiq's Andrew Yoon enjoyed the scaling levels but thought the game was too short: "I anticipated a far grander adventure, especially after the impressive, fully-voiced opening cutscene raised my expectations."
