= The Impossible Game 2 =

2022 video game

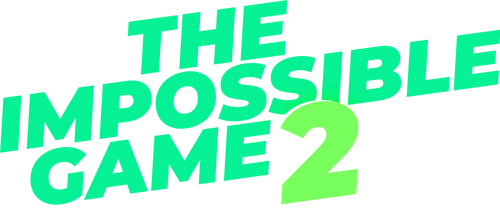
- Developer: Fluke Games
- Publisher: Fluke Games
- Platforms: Android, iOS, Windows
- Release: March 4, 2022
- Genres: Rhythm game, platformer, Free-to-play
- Modes: Single-player, multiplayer

The Impossible Game 2 is a 2022 free-to-play rhythm and platformer video game developed and published by Fluke Games. It is the sequel of The Impossible Game.

== Gameplay ==
In The Impossible Game 2, the player has to overcome obstacles and reach the end flag. There are four worlds, each one with a unique art style, a collection of four levels, and a boss level. There are also bonus levels, which all require real world money.

Checkpoints are also in the game; but they can be disabled for a harder experience.

There is also a level editor in the game; but most features are not available for free.

The game also lets you play in live, online games.

== In-App-Purchases ==
The Impossible Game 2 does not have Ads nor Pay-to-win.

The game does have boosters, which can be used when playing a level with checkpoints, but are disabled when playing in an online game. You can buy more boosters with blocks; the game's currency tied to real-world money.

There is also the Achievement Pass, which costs 400 blocks, that lets you claim rewards from the in-game achievements; and unlocks Cloud 9, a skateboarding level. Achievements can also give you blocks, but only with the pass.

Released on December 6, 2022; the Super Level Pack gave players four original levels with new mechanics. It also costs 400 blocks to unlock.

== Release ==
The Impossible Game 2 entered early access on November 3, 2021. It was released on March 4, 2022.

== Reception ==
Harry Slatter from Gamezebo rated The Impossible Game 2 as 80 out of 100.
