= Unmechanical =

2012 video game

- Developers: Talawa Games; Grip Games (Extended)
- Publishers: NA: Teotl Studios; EU: Crimson Cow; WW: Grip Games (Extended)
- Engine: Unreal Engine 3
- Platforms: Microsoft Windows iOS; Xbox One; PlayStation 3 PlayStation 4 OS X Linux
- Release: Windows: NA: 8 August 2012; EU: 17 October 2012; iOS: WW: 18 March 2013; Xbox One: WW: 30 January 2015; PlayStation 3, PlayStation 4: NA: 10 February 2015; EU: 11 February 2015; AU: 1 September 2015 (PS4); OS X, Linux: WW: 24 November 2015
- Genre: Puzzle
- Mode: Single-player

Unmechanical is a 2.5D puzzle video game developed by now defunct Swedish studio Talawa Games and published by Teotl Studios. It was released in 2012 for Windows. It was later available for iOS. It is available on Steam, GOG.com, GamersGate, OnLive, Rain, Desura and on the App Store. Unmechanical: Extended is an extended edition of the original game, developed by Czech developer Grip Games. It features new levels and bonuses. It was also released for PlayStation 3, PlayStation 4, and Xbox One in 2015.

== Gameplay ==
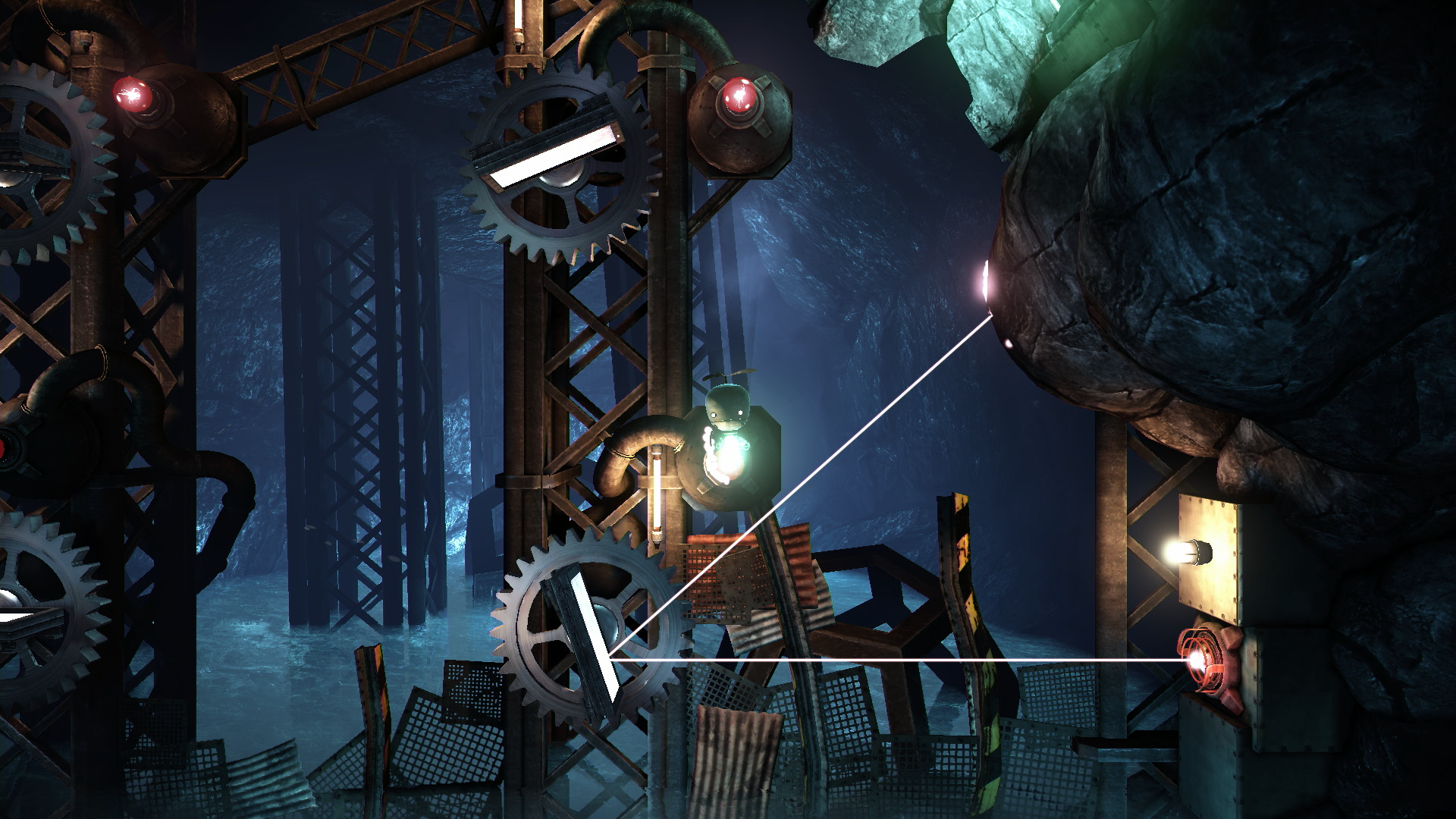
Unmechanical Gameplay

Unmechanical features puzzle solving and exploration. The game began as a student project. Unmechanical focuses on accessible controls that make it easy, and challenges the player with a wide array of puzzles.

== Reception ==
Reception

Aggregate score
Aggregator	Score			
Aggregator	iOS	PC	PS4	Xbox One
Metacritic	78/100	74/100	75/100	66/100

Review scores
Publication	Score			
Publication	iOS	PC	PS4	Xbox One
Destructoid	N/A	N/A	7/10	N/A
Eurogamer	N/A	N/A	N/A	6/10
Famitsu	N/A	N/A	30/40	N/A
GamesMaster	86%	N/A	N/A	N/A
GameSpot	N/A	7/10	N/A	N/A
GamesTM	N/A	N/A	N/A	5/10
PlayStation Official Magazine – UK	N/A	N/A	7/10	N/A
Official Xbox Magazine (UK)	N/A	N/A	N/A	7/10
PC Gamer (UK)	N/A	77%	N/A	N/A
PC PowerPlay	N/A	7/10	N/A	N/A

The iOS and PlayStation 4 versions of Unmechanical received "generally favourable reviews", while the PC and Xbox One versions received "average" reviews, according to the review aggregation website Metacritic. In Japan, where the PS3 and PS4 versions were ported for release and published by Cross Function on 21 October 2015, followed by the Xbox One version on 21 December 2015, Famitsu gave the PS4 version a score of one eight, one seven, one eight, and one seven for a total of 30 out of 40.
