= Zombie Tycoon =

2009 video game

- Developer(s): Frima Studio
- Publisher(s): Frima Studio
- Platform(s): PlayStation Portable
- Release: October 29, 2009
- Genre(s): Real-time strategy
- Mode(s): Single-player

Zombie Tycoon is a 2009 real-time strategy developed and published by Frima Studio for the PlayStation Portable. It was released on the PlayStation Network.

Zombie Tycoon differs from most zombie games in the fact that the player is able to control and customize three squads of zombies rather than fighting them off. The game is not a tycoon game as the title suggests, with gameplay closer to being a real-time strategy game. Like Dead Head Fred, Zombie Tycoon uses the Vicious Engine. The game is playable on the PlayStation 3 as it is a PlayStation mini.

A sequel, Zombie Tycoon 2: Brainhov's Revenge, was released in 2013 for the PlayStation Vita, PlayStation 3, and Microsoft Windows.

== Plot ==
Zombie Tycoon's plot is told via voice-acted animated cutscenes as well as in-game text and dialogue. A mad scientist named Brainhov and his two subordinates have finished perfecting "formula Z", a formula that brings the dead back to life and transforms living humans into zombies. After unsuccessfully testing the formula on the hunchbacked subordinate Ernest he decides to test it on himself, turning into a zombie. The other (nameless) subordinate decides to utilize the formula to conquer the world by using the former Brainhov's invention.

== Gameplay ==
Zombie Tycoon plays like a real-time strategy game. Gameplay takes place in different cities, each level giving different objectives. Buildings are destructible, but enemies may attack from the building, throwing things such as Molotov cocktails. Special enemies such as bounty hunters may organize a resistance force and must be eliminated quickly.

The player controls three squads of zombies using a flying camera to dispense brains, which the zombies follow. Zombie squads may be equipped with several items to improve their offensive, defensive, or movement capabilities. Hospitals may be destroyed by zombies to increase their numbers, allowing up to 8 zombies for each squad. The game is lost when all zombie squads are eliminated.

== Reception ==
Zombie Tycoon received mixed reviews from critics. On Metacritic, the game holds a score of 68/100 based on 5 reviews.

IGN gave the game a 5.2/10, citing "Frustrating AI, an imprecise camera, and bad AI." On the flipside, Pocket Gamer UK gave it 8/10, believing it was "fun, funny, and very original."
