= Mothergunship =

2018 video game

- Developers: Grip Digital; Terrible Posture Games
- Publisher: Grip Digital
- Director: Joe Mirabello
- Programmer: Radek Píbil
- Composer: Mike Mirabello
- Engine: Unreal Engine 4
- Platforms: Windows; PlayStation 4 Xbox One
- Release: July 17, 2018
- Genre: First-person shooter
- Modes: Single-player, multiplayer

Mothergunship is a bullet hell roguelike first-person shooter video game developed by Grip Digital and Terrible Posture Games and published by Grip Digital.

The game released on July 17, 2018 for Windows, PlayStation 4 and Xbox One with mixed reviews upon release. A VR spin-off, Mothergunship: Forge, was released on June 16, 2022.

== Gameplay ==
Taking place somewhere in space, the game is made as a blend of first-person shooter and bullet hell in which the player, who is in the role of a resistance member, must go through a mothership holding an alien robot armada, but must use an oversized arsenal with a gun crafting mechanism, which is essential to the gameplay. The player can pick a variety of weapon attachments to its own weapon at Joe’s Crafting Station, using a unique mix of modular parts via socket. There are three sections to each socket; Connectors which add more sockets, Barrels that represent the firing part of the gun, and Caps that do funny things to your gun. Socket parts have to physically fit into wherever you want to put them while the barrels need to face forward. You can either add or remove any part of the gun you choose. Once their weapon is finished, they can use whatever they made in the levels that are procedurally generated, making each playthrough unique. The game allows cooperative gameplay online.

== Development ==
The developers released a demo in May 2018 to show how the gun crafting would work in the game.

== Spin-off ==
A VR spin-off titled Mothergunship: Forge was announced on March 22, 2022 and has been released on June 16, 2022 for Steam VR and Meta Quest 2. The game later released a "cozy" update on August 18, 2022 with new gun parts, mobs, levels, modes and a beta co-op campaign.

== Reception ==
Reception

Aggregate scores
Aggregator	Score
Metacritic	PC: 72/100; PS4: 78/100; XONE: 77/100
OpenCritic	75% 54% Critics Recommend

Review scores
Publication	Score
GameSpot	8/10
Push Square	7/10

The game received "mixed or average" reviews according to review aggregator website Metacritic. 54% of critics recommend the game on OpenCritic.
