= Chariot (video game) =

2014 video game

- Developer: Frima Studio
- Publisher: Frima Studio (Note: Microids published the Nintendo Switch version.)
- Platforms: PlayStation 4; Xbox One; Windows; Wii U; Android; iOS; PlayStation 3; Nintendo Switch
- Release: 30 September 2014: PlayStation 4; NA: 30 September 2014; PAL: 29 October 2014 Xbox One; WW: 1 October 2014 Windows; WW: 12 November 2014 Wii U; WW: 8 January 2015 Android; WW: 16 September 2015 iOS; WW: 10 March 2016 PlayStation 3; NA: 5 May 2016; PAL: 6 May 2016 Nintendo Switch; WW: 10 May 2018
- Genres: Puzzle, platform
- Modes: Single-player, multiplayer

Chariot is a co-op platform game for the PlayStation 4, PlayStation 3, Xbox One, Wii U, Windows, iOS via Apple TV, and Android via the Nvidia Shield TV, and was developed and published by Frima Studio, with the participation of the Canada Media Fund. It was first released on 30 September 2014 and was launched on Xbox One the next day as part of the Xbox Live Games with Gold program. An enhanced port entitled Super Chariot was released for the Nintendo Switch on 10 May 2018 and included the Royal Gadget Pack DLC.

Chariot differs from most traditional platform games as the objective is to lug around an object, the Chariot, to the end of each level. To do so, the players have to use physics-based mechanics such as pushing and pulling, adding a layer of puzzle to the game.

== Plot ==
Chariot chronicles a princess' quest to fulfill her recently deceased father's final wishes and bury him in peace. As might be expected of royalty, his last request is that he be laid to rest with as much wealth as possible.

== Gameplay ==
The entire game can be played solo or with a partner. The king's body is in a coffin and attached to it are four wheels. The player's character can push the chariot up and down small hills or attach a rope to pull it along. The rope can be extended or shortened to adequately maneuver the chariot throughout the environment. Everything behaves as it should, with real physics playing a big part in how things move.

== Reception ==
On Metacritic, Chariot has an average score of 76 on PlayStation 4, Wii U and PC and 73 on Xbox One. It achieved an 8.5 from Destructoid, as "a memorable game that's hard not to like and recommend to others."
