= Rock-Paper-Sumo =

2010 video game

- Website type: Free-to-play Facebook app
- Owner: Frima Studio
- Creator: Frima Studio
- Website: http://apps.facebook.com/rock_paper_sumo/MainGame.aspx
- Commercial: Yes
- Registration: Free

Rock-Paper-Sumo is a gaming application for Facebook by Frima Studio; it is the first app developed 100% in Quebec for Facebook. It was released in June 2010.

It can be played both in English and French.

As is common to many Facebook apps, users can send gifts to friends or invite them to play.

Players lead their avatar, a sumo, to victory by answering challenges or by sending them. A challenge is a best-two-out-of-three rock-paper-scissors match. Matches which end in a draw or in a player's victory give them money and points. The points help players gain rank within the pyramid, or "ladder". The money can be used to buy clothes (avatar customisation is another common features among Facebook apps) or bento boxes.

The bento boxes are how players gain weight: instead of the more traditional levels, this is an original way to measure their progress within the game. Bento boxes also give energy, with which players can send challenges.

The Sumo and Japanese themes are more prominent in the other facets of the game:

- The daily tasks to gain additional points and cash include "Dojo Duties".
- The in-game money, Bento Bucks (a pun on Bento Box), as well as Dojo Dollars (the currency to be bought with real-world money)
- The avatar's customisation (although other games of Frima, as well as the sponsor)

The app also includes a system of achievements: use a certain move combination, or do a certain task, gain weight, etc.
