= Yummy Yummy Cooking Jam =

2008 video game

- Publisher: Virtual Toys
- Platforms: Wii (WiiWare) iOS; Nintendo DSi (DSiWare); PlayStation Portable
- Release: WiiWare: NA: November 10, 2008; EU: November 21, 2008; iOS; March 31, 2009; DSiWare: EU: September 25, 2009; NA: December 14, 2009; PSP: EU: October 8, 2009; NA: October 29, 2009
- Genre: Action
- Modes: Single-player, Multiplayer

Yummy Yummy Cooking Jam is a video game by Spanish developer Virtual Toys. It is available for WiiWare, DSiWare, PSP minis, iPhone, and iPod Touch. The game won a Pulga award for Best Art at the Videogame Industry in Spain Awards in 2009, held at the Gamelab Interactive Leisure International Trade Fair.

== Gameplay ==
The player takes on the role of being a chef in a restaurant. The goal of the game is to serve food to customers before they get angry and leave. Players prepare the food by performing a variety of different tasks to create each stage of the dish. In each round they are given a time limit with the goal being to collect a certain amount of tips within the time allotted by getting the orders right and out on time.

The overall goal of the game's main career mode is for players to become the best chef in the city. This is achieved by working their way up to the top by passing through the game's four restaurants: The Hot Dog, Hamburger, Pizza and Mexican Restaurant. The game also features a quick-play arcade mode which also supports two player competitive play that sees players racing against each other to see who can accumulate the most tips within the time limit.

== Reception ==
Reception

Aggregate score
Aggregator	Score
Metacritic	(DS) 59/100 (Wii) 40/100

Review scores
Publication	Score
Gamekult	(Wii) 3/10
IGN	(Wii) 3/10
Nintendo Life	(DS) 6/10 (Wii) 5/10
Official Nintendo Magazine	(DS) 57%
Play	(PSP) 78%

The DS version received mixed reviews, while the Wii version received unfavorable reviews, according to the review aggregation website Metacritic. Nintendo Life commented that the latter console version does have some enjoyable elements that will appeal to some gamers but said that the "streaky play control", "sharp difficulty curve" and "fairly short length" make it hard to recommend. IGN believed the gameplay to be tedious, overly simplistic and repetitive, and likened it to a "freeware Flash game".

== See also ==
- Order Up!
