= Puzzle Scape =

2007 video game

- Developer: Farmind
- Publisher: Got Game Entertainment
- Producer: Samuli Pöyhtäri
- Designer: Juhana Virtanen
- Platform: PlayStation Portable
- Release: NA: June 18, 2007
- Genre: Puzzle
- Modes: Single-player, multiplayer

Puzzle Scape is a 2007 puzzle game developed by Finnish developer Farmind and published by Got Game Entertainment.

== Gameplay ==
The game starts with a series of blocks dropping in a playing field and the player's objective is to group blocks within the same color. Once a group of blocks of the same color is arranged in a 2x2 formation, any same-colored adjacent blocks touching the 2x2 group will be deleted from the playing field and awarded points.

== Development and release ==
Puzzle Scape was developed by Finnish developer, Farmind. Samuli Pöyhtäri served as producer and Juhana Virtanen as lead designer. The game was announced on November 8, 2006, and was to be published by O~3 Entertainment. The publishing reins were taken over by Got Games Entertainment in March 2007 and announced a physical version scheduled to be released in May 2007. The game was re-released on October 1, 2009 as a PlayStation Minis launch title.

== Reception ==
Reception

Aggregate score
Aggregator	Score
Metacritic	60/100

Review scores
Publication	Score
GameSpot	6/10
GameSpy	2/5
GamesRadar+	3.5/5
GameZone	7/10
IGN	7.5/10

The game had mixed reviews from critics with a common comparison to Lumines.
