= Vibes (video game) =

2010 video game

- Official logo
- Developer: Laughing Jackal
- Publisher: Laughing Jackal
- Platforms: PlayStation 3, PlayStation Portable
- Release: NA: June 8, 2010; EU: June 9, 2010
- Genre: Rhythm action
- Mode: Single-player

Vibes is a rhythm action video game developed by UK-based studio Laughing Jackal. It was released as a PlayStation mini on the PlayStation Network in North America on June 8, 2010 and Europe on June 9, 2010.

== Gameplay ==
Taro Gold's "Itsuka" gameplay screenshot

The gameplay of Vibes is typical of rhythm action games. The player is required to press buttons in a sequence dictated on the screen. By successfully timing button presses, the player scores. In Vibes, the player controls a customizable pointer and has to press the corresponding button as it approaches, in addition to having the correct direction.

== List of music tracks ==
- Sonic Boom Six – Back 2 Skool (Punk)
- Nikolai Rimsky-Korsakov – Flight of the Bumblebee/ William Tell medley (Classical)
- RedCloud – Traveling Circus (Hip Hop)
- The Words – FAG (Indie)
- Fake Elegance – Hello (Pop)
- Minimalist Orchestra – Flicker (D&B)
- Jamsons Nook – Sway (Rock/Indie)
- Acidman – Tekno (Techno)
- Soundtrap – Secret Lover (main mix) (Electro)
- The Jancee Pornick Casino – Dom Perignon Blues (Psychobilly)
- Spit at Stars – Innocent Breathing (Alternative rock)
- Papa Ross – Tiririri (Latin)

== Reception ==
Reviews of Vibes have been mixed, with Metacritic score of 72, whilst Kristan Reed of Eurogamer states that "developer Laughing Jackal seems to know exactly what buttons to press to get its audience nodding along appreciatively", PlayStation Official Magazine (UK) criticized the title's lack of artists such as Lady Gaga or Crystal Castles.
