= Shift (series) =

- Developers: Antony Lavelle; Armor Games; Fishing Cactus (Shift Extended/Shifting World/Shift DX)
- Publishers: Armor Games (Shift 1-4, Legacy Collection); Zallag (Shift Extended): JP: Arc System Works; (Shifting World): JP: COSEN; (Shift DX): NA: Aksys Games; (Shifting World): EU: Rising Star Games; (Shifting World)
- Producer: Antony Lavelle
- Platforms: Microsoft Windows, Mac, iOS, PlayStation Network, Nintendo 3DS
- Release: Shift; February 1, 2008 (Flash); May 1, 2009 (iOS) Shift 2 March 8, 2008 (Flash); December 22, 2010 (iOS); Shift 3 July 2, 2008; Shift 4 May 20, 2009; Shift Lite; May 2, 2009 Shift Extended: NA: January 18, 2011; EU: January 19, 2011; Shifting World: JP: April 26, 2012; NA: April 24, 2012; EU: September 28, 2012; Shift DX: JP: July 27, 2016; Shift Quantum; May 30, 2018 Shift Legacy Collection; August 7, 2024
- Genres: Puzzle, action
- Mode: Single-player

Shift is a Flash game series created and developed by Antony Lavelle and published by Armor Games. The game has been ported to several platforms, including iOS and PlayStation Minis. The gameplay revolves around pressing the shift key to flip the room. The games have had critical success with Shift 2 having a score of 87/100 on Metacritic.

== Gameplay ==
In Shift, the player is in a room that is half black, half white, one of which is solid. When the player presses the Shift, the room flips upside down, and the opposite color becomes solid. The player tries to get keys and get to doors while avoiding spikes and other objects. Shift makes a few references in some levels to the popular Valve game Portal, with the phrases 'the timer is a lie!' and 'Now you're thinking with shifting'.

In Shift, Keys are used to move Doors around, which can either serve as platforms or obstacles. Starting in Shift 2, your character(s) would pause once they touched a key. In Shift:Freedom, Keys and Doors were color-coded. In Shift 2, Lightbulbs, Checkered Barriers, and Directional Arrows were added. Lightbulbs were used to remove Checkered Barriers that would serve as obstacles. Directional Arrows, when touched, would change the directional gravity of the level. This would result in some Exit Doors be positioned side-ways. The player character would need to be rotated in the same direction relative to the exit door in order to access it.

In Shift 3, levels had both Entrance and Exit Doors, allowing the user to retrace their steps and access previous levels. In addition, some levels had multiple Doors, resulting in the user navigating a maze of levels. Some keys would serve to move Doors in other levels. In Shift 4, the Levels and Exit Doors would be numbered, making it easier to navigate.

In Shift 4, the mechanic of multiple characters had been added, although the user could only control one character at a time. Buttons and Pressure Pads were added, which only worked if a character was holding them down. One character could move to a button/pressure pad to move a door(s), while another character could then get to the Exit Door. Only one character needed to reach the Exit Door in order to go to the next Level.

In Shift : Freedom, boxes were added. Boxes were either black or white, and could be pushed or pulled by the player. The box would be a solid object if the same color as the player, or act as space if it was the opposite color. The box could also be affected by Directional Arrows, as well as certain markers that would cause the Box to Shift.

== History ==
=== Main series ===
- Shift was released February 1, 2008. It was released for iOS on May 1, 2009.
- Shift 2 was released March 8, 2008. It was released for iOS on Dec 22, 2010.
- Shift 3 was released July 2, 2008.
- Shift 4 was released May 20, 2009.

=== Other games ===
- Shift 2 Mini Adventure
- Shift: Freedom! (formerly known as AltShift), containing several minigames.
- Shift Lite is a version of the game released for iOS on May 2, 2009.
- Shift Extended is a version made by Fishing Cactus for PlayStation Minis on Jan 18, 2011.
- Shifting World is a game based on the Shift series that was developed by Fishing Cactus and was published by Arc System Works in Japan (where it is known as Shifting World: The White and Black Labyrinth (SHIFTING WORLD 白と黒の迷宮, Shifutingu Wārudo: Shiro to Kuro no Meikyū)), Aksys Games in North America and Rising Star Games in Europe for the Nintendo 3DS. It was released on April 24, 2012, in North America, April 26, 2012, in Japan and on September 28, 2012, in Europe.
- Shift DX (Nintendo 3DS)
- Shift Quantum (PC, Xbox One, PlayStation 4, Nintendo Switch)
- Shift Legacy Collection (PC) is a collection of the original 4 titles, as well as the Shift 2 Mini Adventure, and will be released on Steam on August 7, 2024.

== Reception ==
The iOS version of Shift was rated 3/4 by Slide to Play, stating "While the iPhone edition of the game has some issues, the mind-bending idea at the core of the experience still captivates."

The iOS version of Shift 2 has a score of 87/100 on Metacritic. Slide to Play rated it 4/4, stating "Shift 2 has the most content of any game in the series on any platform, and it's a great way to spend a dollar."

Shift Extended has a score of 76 on Metacritic.
