= One Epic Game =

2011 video game

- Developer: Grip Games
- Publisher: Grip Games (Note: Mobile ports published by Chillingo.)
- Platforms: PlayStation 3 PlayStation Portable; PlayStation Vita iOS; Android
- Release: PlayStation Network: EU/AU: July 20, 2011; NA: August 2, 2011; iOS: WW: January 26, 2012; Android: WW: February 14, 2012
- Genre: Endless runner
- Mode: Single-player

One Epic Game is an endless runner video game developed and published by Czech company Grip Games. The game was released in July and August 2011 for PlayStation 3, PlayStation Portable, and PlayStation Vita as a PlayStation mini, with iOS and Android receiving ports the following year.

== Gameplay ==
The player controls an infinity running character, who can only jump and shoot. Jumping helps him avoid obstacles and traps while shooting kills enemies. The player can also kill enemies by jumping on their heads. There are multiple game modes in the game. The main mode is the story mode. There are a series of missions with the story running throughout them. There is a task in every mission (for example, travelling 1000 metres, getting to end of a level with only one life or killing a certain number of enemies). Every mission is set in one of five worlds - Zombie Outbreak, Nuclear Wasteland, World War II, Alien Invasion and Fantasy Kingdom. The story is told in the form of comic scenes.

Another mode is Free Run, where the player chooses a world and then tries to get the highest possible score.

The last mode is Challenges where the player chooses a task and then tries to complete it. The player can also choose the difficulty level: for the easiest difficulty level, the player wins a bronze medal, while for the hardest, wins a gold medal.

There are multiple weapons in the game. The players start with a Pistol. They can also acquire another weapon along the way, for example a Shotgun, Machine gun, Rocket launcher, Flamethrower or Laser. Every weapon works differently. When a player is hurt, they lose any weapon they may have acquired during the course of the game and will have to fight with a pistol again. The player can only ever carry one weapon. The player can also pick up a Heart, which gives them a life, or a jetpack, which allows them to fly. There is a checkpoint every 1000 metres.

== Plot ==
The story follows Alpha Dog as he fights diabolical Zork, who tries to destroy the world.

== Characters ==
- Alpha Dog - the main character, he is a traditional action hero. His job is to save the world yet is fully aware that he is a video game character.
- Zork - the antagonist, he wants to destroy the world.
- Mr. P - the US president, he communicates with Alpha Dog and sometimes gives him tasks to complete.

== Reception ==
The game has received mixed to positive reviews from critics. The PlayStation version currently holds 66% on Metacritic while the IPad version holds 69%. The game was praised for its graphics, replay value and gameplay. Some reviewers praised the humor while others criticised it. The game was also criticised for its story.
