= Mad Blocker Alpha =

2011 puzzle video game

- Developer: Open Emotion Studios
- Publisher: Open Emotion Studios
- Platforms: PlayStation 3, PlayStation Portable
- Release: NA: April 19, 2011; EU: February 9, 2011
- Genres: Arcade, Puzzle
- Mode: Single-player

Mad Blocker Alpha (also known as Mad Blocker Alpha: Revenge of the Fluzzle's or MBA) is a puzzle game for the PlayStation Portable and PlayStation 3 in the PlayStation Minis section of the PlayStation Store, developed and published by Irish studio Open Emotion Studios. It was released on February 9, 2011 in Europe and April 19, 2011 in North America.

It is a contemporary take on the classic falling block-style puzzle game made famous by such classics as Tetris and Columns. In Mad Blocker Alpha, players can move the blocks horizontally but not vertically and instead must rack up large combinations of blocks, to trigger chains and unlock power ups.

== Plot ==
The game's story revolves around a race of creatures called Fluzzle's, who hail from a fictional place called Machu Popyu. Evil creatures called Mokes have infected the world and have turned it into an industrial wasteland. A mysterious stranger entices the Fluzzles to leave Machu Popyu and use their magical, shape morphing to resurrect the long dormant, Great Buhmba, and rejuvenate the lands, thus defeating the Mokes. The game features hand drawn cutscenes that guide the player through the game.

== Development ==
The game began development in September 2010 as a simple update of the original flash game. As the game was being developed, the developer decided it may be best to make a sequel to the game and focused on creating an entirely different experience. The game was finished in December 2010, but due to some hiccups, it did not see a final release until February 2011.

== Gameplay ==
Mad Blocker Alpha is a distinct variation on the classic matching genre. In the game you have to match 4 or more of the same coloured blocks together to pop them. Players are encouraged to stack large numbers of blocks, methodically with the intention of triggering large chains. When chains occur a roulette style device at the side of the screen spins and determines whether or not players should be entitled to a power up. The power ups in the game are both negative and positive. The positive blocks include the mad block, which destroys every block that is the same colour as the block it falls upon. The concrete block which destroys everything in a row vertically. The bomb block which explodes in a cross shape and destroys blocks in its path. The negative blocks include the bad blocks, sick green moke blocks that turn an entire row of the players screen to desaturons (or dead blocks) which can only be destroyed with chains.

== Reception ==
The game received a 9 from The Gaming Liberty who said that it is "a fantastic little title that offers so much for such a small entry price. Sure, it's the tried and tested Tetris formula but that doesn't hamper proceedings. It's as playable here as it ever has been, all enclosed in the beautiful and creative world crafted for it. MBA is the first must have Mini for 2011. Do yourself a favour and get it.". Bone-Idle.ie went on to give the game 95% and said "Overall the game is top notch, it is perfect for the Mini's market the story mode gives Mad Blocker Alpha that extra edge it needs to set it apart from your conventional stacking games and the art style and music really round off an excellent game and one of the best game available in PSP Minis series."

On the 9 February 2011, The Sixth Axis reviewed the game, giving it an 8 out of 10. They said "Overall I really enjoyed playing through Mad Blocker Alpha. It will in no way convert those who have little interest in the genre, but for puzzle fans it offers a lot of content coupled with that ‘just one more go’ factor. Now if you'll excuse me, the Open Emotion Twitter account has been taunting me with Endless mode scores of 30,000 plus. This cannot be allowed to stand!"
