= OMG-Z =

2011 video game

- Developer: Laughing Jackal
- Publisher: Laughing Jackal
- Platforms: PlayStation 3 PlayStation Portable; PlayStation Vita; Microsoft Windows
- Release: NA: August 2, 2011; EU: August 3, 2011
- Genre: Action
- Mode: Single-player

OMG-Z is a zombie-themed action puzzle video game developed by UK-based studio Laughing Jackal. It was released as a PlayStation mini on the PlayStation Network in North America on 2 August 2011 and Europe on 3 August 2011.

== Gameplay ==
Set in the fictional city of Redfield during a zombie apocalypse, the gameplay of OMG-Z focuses on causing chain reactions to eliminate the zombies. The player's weapons fire a 'zombie-exploding pathogen' which causes zombies to explode and those nearby to also explode in turn. Through the course of the game's 81 levels, the player is able to upgrade various abilities to improve their performance and achieve higher scores.

== Zombies ==
There are five different types of zombies.

- Normal - Explode when shot, affecting a small area
- Fat - Explode when shot, affecting a larger area
- Police - Fire one shot through anything in front of them
- Acid - Melt into a puddle of acid that deals damage over time to other zombies
- Soldiers - Fire three shots at random angles

== Reception ==
Reviews of OMG-Z have been generally favourable with a Metacritic score of 89 out of 100, making it, as of 12 September 2011, the fourth highest scoring PSP game on the site. Kristan Reed of Eurogamer viewed OMG-Z as "a monstrously addictive quick-fire affair that utterly nails what on-the-go handheld gaming should be about." However, it has been noted by reviewers that releasing the game on the PlayStation mini format has limited the scope of the title and prevented the inclusion of features such as online leaderboards.
