= Grip Digital =

Czech video game developer

- Company type: Private
- Industry: Video games
- Founded: 2009
- Headquarters: Prague, Czech Republic
- Key people: Jakub Mikyska
- Number of employees: 35
- Website: www.grip-digital.com

Grip Digital (also known as Grip Games) is a developer and publisher of video games based in Prague, Czech Republic. It focuses on developing and publishing video games. Its main focus are consoles.

== History ==
The studio was established by Jakub Mikyska and Jan Cabuk. Studio focused to PlayStation Portable consoles but eventually moved to PlayStation 3 and Vita. Employees of Grip Digital were recruited in Studios such as 2K Czech or Disney Mobile.

Grip Digital later got in touch with Teotl Studios, authors of Unmechanical. Grip Digital developed the Extended version of the game. Teotl Studios then decided to keep the cooperation and both studios started to work together on The Solus Project.

== Games ==
Year	Game	Genre	Platforms	Studio's role	Notes
2009	The Impossible Game	Arcade game	PS3, PS Vita, PSP, Xbox 360, PC, iOS, Android	Developed	Published by Fluke Dude.
2010	5-in-1 Arcade Hits	Multi Genre	PS3, PS Vita, PSP	Developed	Compilation of 5 different games.
2010	Blimp: The Flying Adventures	Arcade game	PSP, PS3	Published	Developed by Craneballs Studio.
2011	One Epic Game	Action Arcade Game	PS3, PS Vita, PSP, iOS	Developed	
2011	MiniSquadron	Arcade game	PS3, PS Vita, PSP	Published	Developed by Supermono.
2012	Foosball 2012	Arcade game	PS3, PS Vita	Published	Developed by 3Division.
2013	Atomic Ninjas	Arcade game	PS3, PS Vita	Developed	
2014	Jet Car Stunts	Race game	PC, PS3, PS Vita, Xbox 360	Developed	Remake of the 2009 iOS game of the same name.
2015	Unmechanical: Extended	Arcade game	PS3, PS4, Xbox One	Developed	
2015	Tower of Guns	First-person shooter	PS3, PS4, Xbox One	Ported to consoles	Developed by Terrible Posture Games.
2015	Q.U.B.E: Director's Cut	Puzzle video game	PS3, PS4, Xbox One, Wii U	Ported to consoles	Developed by Toxic Games.
2016	McDroid	Tower defense	PS4, Xbox One	Ported to consoles	Developed by Elefantopia.
2016	The Solus Project	Action-adventure game	PC, Xbox One	Developed	Co-developed with Teotl Studios.
2017	Skylar & Plux: Adventure on Clover Island	3D platform game	PC, PS4, Xbox One	Published, Developed	Co-developed with Right Nice Games; delisted from all 3 platforms indefinitely as of August 2021
2018	Mothergunship	First-person shooter	PC, PS4, Xbox One	Developed	Co-developed with Terrible Posture Games.
2018	Subnautica	Survival horror	PS4, Xbox One	Ported to consoles	Developed by Unknown Worlds Entertainment. Porting work collaborated with Panic Button.
2019	Outward	Action-adventure RPG	PC, PS4, Xbox One	Ported to consoles	Developed by Nine Dots Studio.
