= Atomic Ninjas =

2013 video game

- Developer: Grip Games
- Publisher: Grip Games
- Platforms: PlayStation 3, Vita
- Release: NA: 8 October 2013; EU: 2 October 2013
- Genre: Platform
- Modes: Single-player, multiplayer

Atomic Ninjas is a multiplayer 2.5D platform game developed by Czech company Grip Games. It was released for PlayStation 3 and PlayStation Vita. Grip Games planned to release Microsoft Windows and OS X versions; the game was greenlit on 27 November 2014, but is still unreleased as of 2018.

== Gameplay ==
Players can choose if they want to play in split-screen or as an online game. The game also includes a single-player option. There are multiple modes such as deathmatch or capture the flag. Players can choose out of seven playable ninjas and seven arenas to play in.

Players can't kill each other in direct fight but have to push their enemy into a trap, which is part of an arena. There are also skills that you can upgrade

== Characters ==
=== Sergei, the Ninja ===
A drunkard and an atomic engineer who loves to sleep while at work. He is responsible for a nuclear disaster which he miraculously survived and became an atomic ninja. He is looking for the last rehabilitation center to cure himself. Personal quote: "The shovel is mightier than the sword!"

=== Very Last Samurai ===
The position of the Last Samurai goes from father to son in his family. He has no successors. Personal quote: "Honor. Respect. Karaoke."

=== Masked Ninja ===
He hides his face because it is ugly. He killed his tutor who asked him if he is hiding his face to protect himself from fear in his soul or to scare his enemies. No personal quote.

=== Rogue Ninja ===
He never became a master even though he is great at combat and invisible as a ghost. He always failed in the tea ceremony. It fueled him with rage. He kills every ninja master he meets. Personal quote: "Would you like some tea?"

=== Old Monk ===
He is old, wise, compassionate and gentle but has problems with prostate and ungrateful grandchildren. Personal quote: "I had something important to tell you, but I forgot what it was!"

=== Psycho Ninja ===
The end of the world made him more resilient, tougher, stronger and willing to live. On the other hand, it made him a blood-lusting, giggling, deranged maniac. Personal quote: "Can we cuddle afterwards?"

=== Zombie ===
He became an ugly monster. His muscles became a jelly and his skin started to rot. His only interest are brains. Personal quote: "Brains! Braaaaaains. Brrrrains? BRAINSSS!"

== Reception ==
The game received mixed or average reviews from critics. The most positive review came from PlayStation Universe which scored 75%. It praised portable gaming option, character and their super abilities. On the other hand, it criticised limited single-player and the design of arenas and low number of attacks.

The most negative review came from PlayStation LifeStyle which gave 30%. It criticised lack of content, repetitive gameplay, the visuals and bot system. On the other hand, it praised character design.
