= Jet Car Stunts =

2014 racing video game

- Developer: Grip Games
- Publishers: BitComposer Entertainment; Grip Games (PS3, Vita); True Axis (XBO)
- Platforms: PlayStation 3; PlayStation Vita; Xbox 360; Xbox One; Microsoft Windows
- Release: Windows; 1 May 2014; Xbox 360; EU: 27 August 2014; NA: 1 October 2014; PlayStation 3, Vita; EU: 7 October 2014; NA: 8 October 2014; AU: 20 August 2015 (PS3); Xbox One; 13 March 2015
- Genre: Racing video game
- Modes: Single-player, multiplayer

Jet Car Stunts is a 2014 video game developed by Grip Games and published by BitComposer Entertainment. It is a remake of the 2009 iOS game of the same name.

== Development ==
The game was in development for almost a year. It was announced in April 2014 for multiple platforms including Windows, Xbox 360 and PlayStation platforms. Developers decided not to make a port of the mobile game but instead to produce a proper remake. Grip Games implemented many improvements, including redone graphics, some changes to the car lineup, physics updates, and additional modes. An Xbox One version was released on March 13, 2015.

== Gameplay ==
The game has the same gameplay as the original Jet Car Stunts. It is a hybrid between a racing and a platform game. Player controls a Jet Car, a combination of a race car and a jet plane, to get through platform tracks, performing stunt tricks along the way. It also features new cars, 36 testing tracks, three game modes, HD graphics, damage modelling and asynchronous multiplayer.

== Reception ==
The game received mixed to negative reviews, with Metacritic reporting a weighted average score of 52 out of 100 based on 9 reviews, indicating "mixed or average reviews".
