= Pocket God =

2009 video game

- Version 1.45 icon of Pocket God (December 19, 2012)
- Developer: Bolt Creative
- Publishers: iOS; Bolt Creative; Android; Bolt Creative; Windows Phone ngmoco Facebook; Frima studio
- Platforms: iOS, Android, Windows Phone, Verizon Wireless
- Release: iOS; January 9, 2009; Verizon Wireless; September 1, 2010; Android; December 1, 2010; Windows Phone; December 4, 2010; Facebook; December 23, 2010
- Genre: God game
- Mode: Single-player

Pocket God is a simulation game developed by Bolt Creative, in which the player manipulates an island and its inhabitants. It was released for the iPad, iPhone, and iPod Touch on January 9, 2009, and released for Verizon Wireless on September 1, 2010, Android on December 1, 2010, and Windows Phone on December 4, 2010. The Facebook version was released December 23, 2010.

== Gameplay ==
The player takes the role of an omnipotent being who rules over an island and controls everything. The primitive islanders, known as Pygmies, are subject to the player's god powers. These range from benevolent powers, such as giving the islanders a fishing rod, to destructive, such as summoning a hurricane, or simply entertaining, such as levitating the Pygmies. Built-in features of iOS, the iPad, and iPod Touch are used, such as the accelerometer to simulate gravity and earthquakes. Most of these features can be toggled on the game's menu bar. The "March of the Fire Ants" update also added a new feature known as OpenFeint, where players can access chat rooms, leaderboards, achievements, and announcements during gameplay.

One of the game's most notable features was the regular release of updates introducing additional content. The episodes A New Home, Dead Pygmy Walking, and The Pyg Chill added additional islands to the game, which can be toggled from the menu bar. The Fun n' Games until A Pygmy Gets Hurt update added mini-games for consecutive coconut bounces, consecutive shark snaps, underwater skewer, pygmy bowling, and hurricane zaps. The Ooga Jump update added the first crossover minigame, Ooga Jump, which was followed by a Harbor Master crossover. In the Idle Hands 2: Caught With Your Pants Down update more idle features were added to the Pygmies when they are not in use. Also, Buddy Challenges were implemented with OpenFeint. In the Good Will Haunting update, a downloadable content (DLC) store was added with changeable skins for the T-Rex. Other packs, such as the Halloween, holiday, and alien themes, have since been added.

In December 2012, it was announced Episode 47: Apocalypse Ow! would be the game's final major update.

A bonus episode, Episode 48: Call of Booty, released to the App Store on November 27, 2014.

== Facebook version ==
A Facebook version of Pocket God was released on December 23, 2010, citing more features from the mobile versions of the game. It was co-developed by Frima studio and discontinued in 2015.

== Releases ==
Pocket God was released for iOS devices on January 9, 2009.

Pocket God has since been released on several non-Apple platforms. A version was released for Verizon Wireless cellphones on September 1, 2010. An Android port (published by ngmoco) was released on December 1, 2010. A Facebook port (co-developed by Frima studio) moved to closed Beta on the same day. Pocket God was also released on Windows Phone.

== Spin-offs ==
Pocket God: Journey to Uranus, a spin-off title developed by Bolt Creative, was released on December 16, 2010. Similar to the original title, this game was updated episodically, allowing players to travel to various planets and dimensions.

In 2013, Bolt Creative released Pocket God: Ooga Jump, a platformer for iOS.

== Reception ==
Pocket God has received positive reviews. iTunes App Reviews gave the game 5 out of 5 stars. AppStruck gave the game 5 out of 5 stars referring to the game as "endlessly amusing and is an easy way to completely lose track of time". iPhone App Reviews gave the updated version of the game 4.8 out of 5 having given the original version 3.92 out of 5. Appvee gave the game 4 out of 5 after episode 11 was released, having originally given the game 1.8 out of 5.

=== Controversy ===
The game was subject to controversy when Pacific Islanders and anthropologists protested to Apple, claiming that the game was racist. The game's creators defended the game, saying "it depicts no specific race or nationality." Pocket God programmer Dave Castelnuovo got in touch with one of the original complainants and proposed compromises: The islanders would be called Oogs instead of Pygmies, and the Moai statue would be replaced with a statue of an Octopus God. On May 27, 2009, Castelnuovo announced that the characters would no longer be called Oogs, claiming that 'Pygmies' was a more suitable name, and that the original name did not actually cause any friction with Pacific Islanders.

== Collaborations ==
The addition of Doodler to Pocket God resulted in a new version of Doodle Jump being released on May 22, 2009, which allowed users to play as a Pygmy from Pocket God. To unlock the Pygmy, players must change the high score name to one of the characters from Pocket God: Ooga, Booga, Nooby, Dooby, Klik or Klak.

The second crossover was with Harbor Master on August 8, 2009, where Pygmies replaced the normal boats in the path drawing game.

The final cross promotion saw a new test added to "Moron Test" with a Pocket God theme to it, which characters from the Moron Test were featured on a new island and minigame within the Pocket God universe.

The Creeps released an update with characters based Pygmies.

Trenches added to their "Zombie Horde" mode by allowing Zombie Pygmies to replace the Zombie Germans as the antagonists within the game.

Announced in 2015 was the spin-off game Pocket God vs Desert Ashes.
