= Laughing Jackal =

United Kingdom based independent video game developer established in 2005

Laughing Jackal Ltd
- Company type: Subsidiary
- Industry: Video games
- Founded: 2005
- Headquarters: Braintree, United Kingdom
- Parent: Majesty House Group
- Website: laughingjackal.co.uk

Laughing Jackal Ltd is an independent video game developer, part of the Majesty House Group based in Essex, United Kingdom. Established in 2005, it has developed titles for Wii, Nintendo DS, PlayStation Portable, PlayStation Mobile, PlayStation 3 and iOS.

== Games developed ==
- Road to Vegas - Nintendo DS - 2008
- The Big Deal - Nintendo DS - 2009
- Digitars: The Magnificent Flying Funfair - Nintendo DS - 2010
- Mary King's Riding School 2 - Wii - 2010
- Cubixx - PlayStation mini - 2010
- Stellar Attack - PlayStation mini - 2010
- Vibes - PlayStation mini - 2010
- Card Shark - PlayStation mini - 2010
- Ace Armstrong vs. The Alien Scumbags - PlayStation mini - 2010
- Duæl Invaders - PlayStation mini - 2011
- OMG-Z - PlayStation mini - 2011
- Cubixx HD - PlayStation 3 - 2011
- Fighting Fantasy: Talisman Of Death - PlayStation mini - 2011
- Fighting Fantasy: The Warlock of Firetop Mountain - PlayStation mini - 2011
- Orbit - PlayStation mini - 2011
- Hungry Giraffe - PlayStation mini, iOS, PlayStation Vita - 2012
- OMG HD Zombies - PlayStation Vita - 2013
- OMG Zombies! - Windows - 2014
- Flame Over - Windows, PlayStation Vita - 2015
- Way of the Samurai 4 - Windows - 2015
