= Big Brain Wolf =

2009 video game

- Developer: Frima Studio
- Publisher: Frima Studio
- Platforms: Mac OS X, Windows
- Release: NA: November 3, 2009 (Steam)
- Genres: Adventure, puzzle
- Mode: Single-player

Big Brain Wolf is a puzzle video game developed and released by Frima Studio through Steam in 2009. The game was created with the participation of the NeuroActive Program and Telefilm Canada.

== Plot ==
Screenshot

This asthmatic, vegetarian wolf is a genie in training. To prove his mother's innocence, he will have to unravel some 60 puzzles in five chapters. The number and treatment of fairy tale characters are reminiscent of movies like Shrek or Hoodwinked. It includes Pinocchio and Geppetto, Little Red Riding Hood, the Three Little Pigs, Prince Charming, and of course, the Big Bad Wolf.
