= Monochrome Racing =

2011 video game

- Developer: Nordcurrent
- Publisher: Nordcurrent
- Director: Alex Bravve
- Platforms: WiiWare; PlayStation Portable
- Release: PlayStation Portable: NA: August 2, 2011; EU: August 3, 2011; WiiWare: NA/EU: August 4, 2011
- Genre: Racing
- Modes: Single-player, multiplayer

Monochrome Racing is a 2011 racing video game developed and published by the Lithuanian video game developer Nordcurrent. Released in August 2011, Monochrome Racing received "generally unfavorable reviews" from critics.

== Gameplay ==
Monochrome Racing is a racing game that supports up to 4 players. The game takes place in a monochrome race track in which the player needs to fuel the car they're driving by going through checkpoints. In each race, the player starts off with full color, however, as the player drives, the color gets drained, and if the car turns fully monochrome, the player loses. Throughout races, power-ups will appear randomly on the race track, which, when collected, can either increase the player's statistics or negatively effect opponents. After finishing races, the player earns money, which can be used to upgrade the player's vehicles. The game features 80 tracks and 12 vehicles. The game also features a "Career mode". When playing single-player, the player races against AIs.

== Development and release ==
Monochrome Racing is based on the mode Head-To-Head from the 1994 game Micro Machines 2: Turbo Tournament.

Monochrome Racing released as a PlayStation mini on August 2, 2011, in North America and on August 3, 2011, in Europe for the price of $5, and later released as WiiWare on August 4, 2011, for the price of 500 Wii Points, the Wii Shop Channel currency. The game was later rereleased through the 2012 compilation game Robin Hood + Monochrome Racing.

== Reception ==
Reception

Aggregate score
Aggregator	Score
Metacritic	25/100 (Wii) (Note: Based on 6 reviews.)

Review scores
Publication	Score
GamePro	40/100
GamesMaster	10/100
IGN	3/10
NGamer	0/100
Nintendo Life	2/10
PlayStation Official Magazine – UK	2/10
PSM3	4.2/10
Push Square	2/10

Monochrome Racing received "generally unfavorable reviews", with the Wii release of the game having a score of 25/100 on review aggregator Metacritic. While the premise of the game was praised by critics, the game's execution was criticized, with IGN's Lucas Thomas calling it "horrendous." Multiple critics called the game one of the worst WiiWare titles released, with Martin Kitts of Nintendo Gamer calling Monochrome Racing the worst game of 2011. Iain Macintosh, writing for PlayStation Official Magazine – UK, called the game confusing. Sammy Barker, in a review for Push Square, criticized the game's upgrade system, calling it "careless". Barker also criticized the game's price. Terry Terrones, writing for GamePro, noted how the game has "some enjoyable local multiplayer moments" and also praised how the game was "easy to pick up and play," but criticized its "derivative gameplay," "awful camera," "lack of variety," and "defective A.I."
