= Karoshi (video game) =

Series of puzzle platformer video games

- Genre: Puzzle-platform
- Developer: YoYo Games
- Creator: Jesse Venbrux
- Platforms: Windows; Flash; iOS; Android; PlayStation Portable; PlayStation 3

Karoshi is a series of puzzle-platform games created by Jesse Venbrux and developed by YoYo Games Ltd, in which the goal is to make the player character, a Japanese salaryman named "Mr. Karoshi", commit suicide. The word "karōshi" literally means "death by overwork" in Japanese.

The series titles span a number of platforms. The oldest games, Karoshi, Karoshi 2.0, and Karoshi Factory, were released as standalone executables for Windows. Karoshi: Suicide Salaryman and Super Karoshi run on the Adobe Flash platform, the latter of which was developed by Armor Games. The latest installment, Mr. Karoshi, was primarily targeted at the iOS and Android platforms. The game has since been pulled from the iTunes and Google Play app stores for unknown reasons. All of the games, save Mr. Karoshi, have since been released as freeware, and all of them except the Flash titles were made with Game Maker.

== Reception ==
Mr. Karoshi has a rating of 86% on Metacritic, based on 11 reviews. It won the Android game of the year at Pocket Gamer for 2012.
