= Freekscape: Escape From Hell =

2010 video game

- Developer(s): Kidguru Studios
- Publisher(s): Creat Studios
- Platform(s): PlayStation Portable
- Release: 8 April 2010
- Genre(s): Puzzle-platform
- Mode(s): Single-player

Freekscape: Escape From Hell is a puzzle-platform game developed by Brazilian company Kidguru Studios and published by Creat Studios for the Sony PlayStation Portable, and released on 8 April 2010. The game uses the Vicious Engine.

The game involves controlling a demon called Freek who is attempting to exit hell. The player must solve puzzles in order to be able to progress through each level.

== Reception ==
In their review of the game, IGN gave it a score of 7.5.
