= Frima Studio =

Canadian digital entertainment studio

- Company type: Private
- Industry: Video games, Animation
- Founded: 2003; 23 years ago
- Headquarters: 395, rue Victor Revillon; Quebec City, Quebec; G1K 3M8
- Key people: Philippe Bégin, Christian Daigle, Steve Couture
- Products: FATED, Chariot, Nun Attack, Nun Attack: Run & Gun, MaXi, Talent Not Included, A Space Shooter for 2 Bucks!
- Number of employees: <200 (as of April 2025)
- Website: frimastudio.com/en/

Frima Studio is a Canadian video game development company founded in 2003 and based in Quebec.

In 2010, Frima was noted as one of the fastest-growing companies in Canada by Profit.

== History ==
The company was founded in Quebec City in 2003 by Steve Couture, Philippe Bégin, and Christian Daigle amid the dot-com crash. Originally, the name Frima comes from the French word "frimas," which is the layer of frost that forms around windows during winter. This is due to the fact that the studio made its debut in the poorly-insulated apartment that the three founders shared. Frima has notably developed Flash games for many famous intellectual properties, including Harry Potter and Looney Tunes.

In 2008, Frima acquired Humagade, a mobile game developer. Shortly after, the studio was merged with the main Frima office.

In 2009, with the opening of a second studio in Matane, Frima had an estimated 265 full-time employees. Later that year, they became the beneficiary of a $2 million joint investment between the company and the Government of Quebec to fund employee training. This resulted in the creation of 147 new jobs over the next three years, and the maintenance of 201 pre‐existing production‐oriented jobs.

In June 2011, the Matane studio was shut down. Frima cited the difficulty of attracting talent to the area as the primary reason. In August of that year, Frima acquired Volta, an animation, concept art and design studio. The division was sold to Keywords Studios for $5.25 million in 2016. Frima stated the profit would allow them to further focus on internal animation. During Frima's ownership, the two collaborated on several projects, such as the 2015 Bionicle relaunch, where Volta handled the animated television series while Frima developed the mobile video game.

In 2014, the company's Quebec City head office moved to the former television studios of TQS owned-and-operated station CFAP-TV in the Saint-Roch neighborhood. By then, Frima had grown to over 350 employees. In April 2015, the company received a $7.5 million investment from Média-Participations and Fonds de solidarité FTQ. The following November, Frima opened an additional studio in Montreal.

On February 22, 2017, the Montreal studio was shuttered as Frima laid off 60 employees. The company's total headcount was reduced to 250. The following April, Couture stepped down as CEO. Daigle replaced him until Martin Carrier was appointed as CEO and president in August 2017. Daigle would return to the position after Carrier left the company in 2020. In 2024, Frima sold its original gaming properties to Epic Storyworlds, a company run by Couture. Following a project cancellation and a reduction in provincial tax credits, Frima laid off 37 employees in March 2025, dropping to less than 200 in total.

== Softography ==
=== Original productions ===
==== Console games ====
Year	Title	Platform	Description
2016	Fated	PlayStation VR, Oculus Rift, HTC Vive	First Person narrative adventure VR game revolving around the themes of courage and sacrifice.
2016	Talent Not Included	Xbox One, Windows, MacOS	A platform game revolving around 3 actors putting on a play.
2014	Chariot	PlayStation 4, Xbox One, Wii U, Nintendo Switch	A co-op platform game about a princess, her fiancé, and a deceased king.
2013	Zombie Tycoon 2: Brainhov's Revenge	PlayStation 3, PlayStation Vita, Windows	A real-time strategy game about zombie warfare.
2013	Nun Attack	PlayStation Vita	A tactical action game about nuns blasting evil with guns.
2012	Lights, Camera, Party!	PlayStation 3	A mini-game compilation utilizing PlayStation Move controls.
2010	A Space Shooter for 2 Bucks!	PlayStation Portable, PlayStation 3, Web, PlayStation Vita	A classic and simple space shooter game... for 2 bucks.
2010	Young Thor	PlayStation Portable	Action-adventure game starring Thor when he was a lad.
2010	Widgets Odyssey	PlayStation Portable	Sci-fi side-scrolling platform game.
2009	Zombie Tycoon	PlayStation Portable	Real-time strategy zombie game.

==== Virtual worlds and CMMOs ====
Year	Title	Platform	Description
2014	Lightbringers: Saviors of Raia	Web, iOS, Android	A Mobile 3D Hack and Slash game in the style of Diablo.
2007	GalaXseeds	Web	Free sci-fi based, web MMO.

==== Social and web games ====
Year	Title	Platform	Description
2012	Space Shooter Blitz	Web	
2010	Pocket God	Web	Facebook app based on the popular Bolt franchise for mobile, in association with Bolt.
2010	Rock Paper Sumo	Web	Facebook application based on the Rock-Paper-Scissors system.
2009	Big Brain Wolf	PC, Mac	Puzzle/point-and-click adventure game, in association with the NeuroActive Program.
2007	Widgets Odyssey	Web	Sci-fi side-scrolling platform game.
2007	Jules & Hurtubize	Web	Dystopian side-scrolling platform game.
2007	Ciao Bella	PC	Romantic simulation game.
2007	Peter Flat's Inflatable Adventures	PC	Comical 3D platform game.

==== Smartphone games ====
Year	Title	Platform	Description
2016	Trainers of Kala	iOS, Android	RTS Mobile Game
2016	Splash Pop	iOS, Android	
2014	Nun Attack Origins: Yuki's Silent Quest	iOS, Android	Platformer mobile game
2013	Nun Attack: Run & Gun	iOS, Android	
2012	Nun Attack	iOS, Android	A tactical action game about nuns blasting evil with guns.
2012	Space Shooter Blitz	iOS, Android	
2012	Cosmo Camp	Android, Kindle Fire, iOS	Educational app.
2011	A Space Shooter for Free!	iPhone, iPod Touch, iPad, Android, Ouya	A classic and simple space shooter game for free!
2009	GalaXseeds Tubershooter	iPhone, iPod Touch, iPad	Casual shooter game linked with the GalaXseeds MMOG.

==== Animation ====
Year	Title	Platform	Description
2018	L'Agent Jean / Super Agent Jon Le Bon!	Television series	A 15 x 3-minute animated series (with a seven-minute Christmas special) based on a line of books by the same name. Aired as interstitial shorts on TFO, Ici Radio-Canada Télé, and CBC Television, as well as streamed online.
2016	MaXi	Television series	A 26 x 11-minute animated series, released on television by TFO and as a mobile application.

=== Development services ===
==== Virtual worlds and CMMOs ====
Year	Title	Client	Platform	Description
2015	Wanagogo	Studio 100	Windows, iOS, Android	Subscription-based virtual world for players between 4 and 6 years old.
2012	Kazaana	PixyKids	Windows, iOS, Android	
2011	Skylanders Universe	Activision	Web	Virtual world where children play different mini-games set in the Skylanders franchise.
2011	Super Zapp!	Les Éditions CEC	Web	Educational virtual world where children can learn through different mini-games.
2010	LeapWorld	LeapFrog	Web	Virtual world for players between 4 and 6 years old.
2009	Littlest Pet Shop Online	Electronic Arts/Hasbro Interactive	Web	The player manages a virtual pet shop with friends.
2008	Tracksters	10Vox Entertainment	Web	Multiplayer online racing game
2008	Magi-Nation: Battle for the Moonlands	Cookie Jar Group (Tribal Nova)	Web	Virtual world set in a medieval fantasy environment inspired by the animated series of the same name.
2007	Build-A-Bearville.com	Build-A-Bear Workshop	Web	Virtual world where the player creates a customized character and plays mini-games.
2007	NÉO Shifters	Mega Brands	Web	Futuristic virtual world featuring multiplayer robot battles.

==== Social and web games ====
Year	Title	Client	Platform	Description
2014	Dream Town	Bandai	Web	The TamaTown website for the Tamagotchi Friends
2013	Half the Sky Movement: The Game	Games for Change	Web	
2012	Yu-Gi-Oh! BAM	Konami	Web, iOS, Android	
2012	Teenage Mutant Ninja Turtles - Ninja Turtle Tactics 3D	Nickelodeon	Web	Based on the 2012 TV series.
2010	DriverVille	Doner	Web	Facebook app developed in association with Mazda featuring adventures and customizable items.
2009	Sara's Super Spa Deluxe	Shockwave	Web	Strategic spa management game
2008	Nick Pals	Nickelodeon	Web	Simulation game featuring different Nickelodeon pets.
2008	Go Diego Go!	Nick Jr. Channel	Web	Based on the TV show, an educational adventure game.
2007	Avatar Bobble Battles	Nickelodeon/Nick Arcade	PC, Web	Casual real-time strategy game based on the TV franchise.

==== Console games ====
Year	Title	Client	Platform	Description
2024	Triangle Strategy	Square Enix	Meta Quest 2, Meta Quest Pro, Meta Quest 3	Virtual-reality port
2021	Disciples: Liberation	Kalypso Media	Windows, PlayStation 4, Xbox One, PlayStation 5, Xbox Series X/S	
2021	Oddworld: Soulstorm	Oddworld Inhabitants	Windows, PlayStation 4, Xbox One	Re-imagining of the 1998 title Oddworld: Abe's Exoddus
2018	Illusion: A Tale of the Mind	Groupe PVP	Windows, PlayStation 4, Xbox One	
2017	Carcassonne - Tiles & Tactics	Asmodee	Windows, Nintendo Switch	
2017	Jeopardy!	Ubisoft	PlayStation 4, Xbox One, Nintendo Switch	Adaptation of the television game show.
2016	Battleship	Ubisoft	PlayStation 4, Xbox One	Adaptation of the board game.
2016	Colt Express	Asmodee	Windows	Adaptation of the board game.
2015	Boggle	Ubisoft	PlayStation 4, Xbox One	Adaptation of the board game.
2015	Resident Evil: Revelations 2	Capcom	PlayStation Vita	One of the Resident Evil installments features the horrific adventure of Claire Redfield and Barry Burton along with each's unique partner; the main developer on Vita portion.
2015	Carmen Sandiego Returns	The Learning Company	Windows	
2010	Vector Tower Defense	Fun Tank	PSP	Strategy game where the player defends Earth from alien invaders.
2010	Pet Pad	LeapFrog	Leapster Explorer	Educational game where the player practices handwriting to care for their in-game pet. The game was included with the Leapster Explorer.
2009	Desktop Tower Defense	THQ	Nintendo DS	Strategy game where the player has to prevent invaders from crossing the screen.
2009	Brainpipe	Hands-On Mobile	Smartphone, PSN	Simple arcade game focusing on eye-hand coordination.
2008	Calvin Tucker's Redneck Jamboree	Zoo	Wii	Party game featuring mini-games.
2008	Lola and Virginia	V.2 Play	Nintendo DS	Mini-games themed around the popular TV show Lola and Virginia.
2007	Puppy Luv Spa and Resort	Activision/Game Mill	Nintendo DS, Game Boy Advance	Simulation game in which the player takes care of different pets.

==== Smartphone games ====
Year	Title	Client	Platform	Description
2024	Temple Run: Legends	Imangi Studios	iOS	
2021	Harry Potter: Wizards Unite	Niantic	Android, iOS	
2020	Forza Street	Xbox Game Studios	Android, iOS	
2019	Fortnite	Epic Games	Android, iOS	
2017	Carcassonne - Tiles & Tactics	Asmodee	Android, iOS	Adaptation of the board game.
2016	Colt Express	Asmodee	Android, iOS	Adaptation of the board game.
2016	Where's Monsieur Pug?	National Film Board of Canada	Android, iOS	Augmented reality game inspired by the 2014 short Monsieur Pug.
2016	Bionicle: Mask of Control	Lego Group	Android, iOS	Free-to-play adventure game based on the Bionicle media franchise.
2016	Con Man: The Game	Monkey Strength Productions	Android, iOS	Business simulation game based on the Con Man web-series.
2016	View-Master Masters of the Universe VR	Mattel	Android, iOS	Virtual reality experience developed for the View-Master VR Google Cardboard headset.
2015	View-Master Space	Mattel	Android, iOS	Virtual reality experience developed for the View-Master VR Google Cardboard headset.
2015	Dinotrux	DreamWorks Animation	Android, iOS	Interactive app inspired by the TV show.
2015	DreamWorks Color	DreamWorks Animation	Android, iOS	
2015	Nexo Knights: Merlok 2.0	Lego Group	Android, iOS	
2015	Code Max	Pixcom Productions		
2015	Dennis & Gnasher: Blast In Beanotown	DC Thomson	iOS	3D action game based on Dennis & Gnasher
2014	Monster High: Monster Maker	Mattel	Android, iOS, Kindle Fire	Custom toy designer.
2010	Greatest Tank Battles	Breakthrough Entertainment	iPhone, iPod Touch, iPad	Real-time strategy game where the player controls a tank inspired by the TV show.
2010	Build-A-Bear Workshop App	Build-A-Bear Workshop	iPhone, iPod Touch, iPad	Mobile app with features linking to Build-A-Bear Workshop and their virtual world.
2009	Monkey Kick-Off	Miniclip	iPhone, iPod Touch	Kick the coconut as far as possible in this casual game.
2009	iBrain Fit	Brain Center International	iPhone, iPod Touch	Scientifically-designed brain training through mini-games.
2009	Brainpipe	Hands-On Mobile	iPhone, iPod Touch	Simple arcade game focusing on eye-hand coordination.
2009	Parade	Carnaval de Québec	iPhone, iPod Touch	Strategy game where the player has to recreate the Carnaval de Québec's parade.
2008	Beijing 2008	Beijing 2008	iPhone, iPod Touch	Mini-games based on the different Olympic events.
2008	America's Got Talent	Player X	iPhone, iPod Touch	Game in which the player has to match moves to become America's next rising star.
2006	Deal or No Deal: Banker's Revenge	Mobliss	Mobile	Casual game in which the player takes on the role of the Banker.
2005	Family Guy: Stewie 2.0	Airborne Entertainment	Mobile	Real-time strategy game based on the popular TV franchise.

==== Animation and special FX ====
Year	Title	Client	Platform	Description
2018	Elliot the Littlest Reindeer	Awesometown Entertainment	Feature Film	CG-animation.
2018	Nelly & Simon Mission Yeti	Productions 10e ave	Feature Film	CG-animation.
2013	Dragons 3D	Thalie Productions	IMAX short film	Special effects and CG animation.
2010	Qualinet Space Odyssey	Qualinet	TV	Special effects realized for a TV ad for Qualinet, the leader in cleaning and disaster response.
2008	Cranium Kabookii	Ubisoft	Wii	Animated intro for Ubisoft's Cranium Kabookii.
2007	W	Productions 10e ave	TV	Series of animated spots that aired for three seasons on the Télétoon network.

== Technologies ==
Frima has been working with the latest version of Adobe Flash Player. Frima was selected by Adobe as a Molehill pre-release partner.

The SnowStorm Gaming Grid allows the creation of customizable social games and MMOGs.

The NorthStar Dashboard is a set of data-tracking tools used to monitor key metrics linked to an online application.

The IceField 3D Engine allows the creation of in-browser 3D experiences using hardware acceleration.

The IceWave 2D Platform is used to easily and seamlessly deploy a project on multiple platforms.
