= The Impossible Game =

2009 platform video game

- Developers: Fluke Games, Grip Games
- Publisher: Fluke Games
- Platforms: Xbox 360; PlayStation 3; PSP; Android; iOS; Windows; MacOS; Linux
- Release: Xbox 360; 2009 iOS, Android; 2010; PlayStation Portable, PlayStation 3; 2011; Windows, macOS, Linux; 2014
- Genre: Platform
- Mode: Single-player

The Impossible Game is a 2009 one-button platform game developed and published by Fluke Games. The objective is to guide a cube over spikes and pits. The Windows, macOS and Linux port was developed by Grip Games. First released in 2009, for the Xbox 360 via the Xbox Live Indie Games, The Impossible Game received generally mixed reviews.

== Gameplay ==
Screenshot of the Fire Aura level, in the Android version

The objective is to guide a cube over spikes and pits. There are 5 levels: Fire Aura, Original Level, Chaoz Fantasy, Heaven and Phazd. There are two modes: normal mode and practice mode. In normal mode, there are no checkpoint flags. If the player dies in this mode, the level will start over from the beginning.

In practice mode, checkpoints flags can be placed at any point in the level. If the player dies in this mode, the player will respawn at the most recently placed checkpoint flag. Each time a level is beaten, a medal is awarded depending on the way they beat it.

On the PC version, there is a level editor available, which players can use to make their own levels, and custom music may be used.

== Development and release ==
The Impossible Game was developed and published by Fluke Games. The Impossible Game was released in late-2009 for the Xbox 360 via Xbox Live Indie Games. By November 2010, The Impossible Game was ported to iOS, and also received an Android release. The Windows, macOS and Linux port was developed by Grip Games.

== Reception ==
Reception

Aggregate scores
Aggregator	Score
GameRankings	(X360) 60% (iOS) 67% (PSP) 87% (PC) 67%
Metacritic	(PC) 64

Review score
Publication	Score
Eurogamer	6/10

The Impossible Game received generally mixed reviews. On Metacritic, the PC version received an aggregated score of 64. On GameRankings, it received 60% on Xbox 360, 67% on iOS, 87% on PSP, and 67% on PC. Eurogamer gave the Xbox 360 version a 6/10, stating that "it's monumentally frustrating, but also bafflingly addictive as you continually try to make precious progress".

== Sequel ==
A sequel, The Impossible Game 2, was announced by Fluke Games in 2021 and released in March 2022.

== See also ==
- Geometry Dash
