= Pallurikio =

2009 video game

- Developer: Playstos Entertainment
- Publisher: Playstos Entertainment
- Platforms: Wii; PlayStation Portable; PlayStation Vita; PlayStation 3
- Release: Wii: EU: December 11, 2009; NA: December 21, 2009; Playstation Store: WW: June 15, 2010
- Genre: Action platformer
- Mode: Single-player

Pallurikio is an action platform game developed and published by Italian game developer Playstos Entertainment.

It was released on the Nintendo Wii through WiiWare in Europe on December 11, 2009, and North America on December 21, 2009. It would release on the PlayStation Store later on June 15, 2010.

== Gameplay ==
A level in Pallurikio.

Pallurikio is a 2D action platform game where the character you play as is called Pallurikio, a red bouncing ball that is controlled by the player. Pallurikio can only jump or roll, and these movements are directed using a cursor (moved with the Wii remote or the analog stick of the PS system) and calibrated holding a button to give power to the jump.

The game has a total of fifty main stages, each being divided into five worlds with ten levels each, with each world based around a unique theme, usually with its own set of collectible items and unique environmental hazards across each level. After beating the main fifty stages, five more stages are playable.

== Plot ==
A boy named Rusty is playing a mysterious board game with his friends, until suddenly Rusty is brought into a parallel dimension and becomes a bouncing ball named Pallurikio. He tries to escape and return to his world after clearing all the stages of the game.

== Reception ==
Reception

Aggregate score
Aggregator	Score
Metacritic	60/100

Review scores
Publication	Score
Destructoid	50/100
IGN	6/10
Nintendo Life	5/10
Wii's World	68/100

Pallurikio received "mixed or average" reviews according to the review aggregation website Metacritic.

Jonathan Holmes from Destructoid would compliment the clean graphics and competent level design, but would critique its music and would overall describe it as "inspiring nothing". Sean Aaron from Nintendo Life would mirror much of the same opinions, liking the graphics and level design but criticizing its lack of "'wow' factor". Rob Jones from Wii's World would praise the game's "imaginative" level design but would share much of the same gripes with the music as other reviewers, calling it an overall "ok experience".
