= Supermono Studios =

UK video game developer

- Type: Private
- Industry: Video games, mobile apps
- Founded: June 8, 2010; 16 years ago
- Fate: Acquired by Red Robot Labs
- Headquarters: London, England
- Key people: Tak Fung (CEO); Dave Ferner (CEO)
- Products: Games for Apple Inc. App Store, Android platform, video game consoles, Sony PSP
- Number of employees: 2
- Website: Official website

Supermono Studios is a video game publisher and application development studio based in London, UK. They are best known for developing games for iOS and Android, with MiniSquadron, EpicWin, and Forever Drive being their most successful and popular titles.

== History ==
Supermono was founded by ex-Lionhead Studios developer Tak Fung and artist Dave Ferner on 8 June 2010. Fung previously created his own game development firm under the name Studio FungFung in 2007. When Dave Ferner joined the company in 2010, they changed the name to Supermono Studios. The studio was originally supposed to be called "SuperThings," but CEO Tak Fung wanted an Asian slant to it - and "mono", which means things in Japanese, led to the name Supermono Studios. Red Robot Labs acquired the company in December 2011.

Since April 2021, their website has been offline, and the company's social media has been dormant since 2019. However, a fan-made Facebook account for Supermono's game, Forever Drive, run by its developers, made a post on 4 July 2023 Their last public activity was a compatibility update to EpicWin on 26 November 2020. It's acquiring company, Red Robot Labs, is also dormant, with its last funding on 21 March 2012, and no social media posts or active website since 2013.

== Applications ==
=== EpicWin ===
EpicWin is an application for iOS that allows the user to gain experience and level up from doing chores. It is intended to act as a motivator and to-do list that rewards the user for sticking to their schedule. Ruben Berenguel stated in a review that the app is “a really interesting and fun to-do app” but “may become dull after a while.” Chris Donlan called it “brilliant” and credited the app with “turning my meaningless little life around” after a week of use.

=== Fox Vs Duck ===
Fox vs. Duck is a game for the iOS platform. The basic goal is to use the tilt functionality of the iPod or iPhone to save the ducks from the hungry wolf. It received positive reviews from various sources including The Independent stating, “Combines winningly simple gameplay with the most stunning yet understated graphics possible...Beautiful and just a little bit spooky, this is a great buy at 59p.”

=== Forever Drive ===
Forever Drive was a futuristic 3D racing game with the ability for users to create and share tracks. The game used a customizable and never-ending race track created by the community, as well as customizable vehicles and a leveling system. Players would race against the clock to gain experience points to level up, unlocking additional features in the process. The game used a free-to-play business model, where the game was free to download and play, but players had the option to pay for in-game credits to speed progression or obtain in-game cosmetics. In a 4.5-star review for TouchArcade, Nissa Campbell wrote that “Forever Drive is a slick, mellow game that rewards both your time and your skill.” Its server is now down, preventing further gameplay.

=== MiniSquadron ===
MiniSquadron is an arcade dogfighting game that involves the user taking control of one of many aeroplanes with the objective of defeating waves of enemies in order to advance to another stage. In total, there are eight levels of increasing difficulty, over 50 planes to unlock, and different weapons to choose from. The company's most successful game, MiniSquadron received positive reviews and was rated #3 on appadvice.com's list of 100 greatest iPhone apps of all time. 148Apps called it “fluid, smooth, and above all a fantastic plane-based shooter.”

=== Mini Squadron SE ===
The game was re-released as a special edition. This brought new features to the game in the form of additional unlockable planes, helicopters, weapons, and levels. The special edition also improved on graphics.

=== Rescue Rush ===
A location-based arcade game that used real-world map data to generate in-game-level content.

== Other platforms ==
There are versions of MiniSquadron on Android, Palm Pre and Sony PSP, although the PSP version has not received the same critical success as other versions. While it was sold at a competitive price on the PSP Minis sections of the PlayStation Network, the PSP version of the game does not support the multiplayer aspect of the game due to the quick approval rate advertised by Sony for the line of PSP mini games. Ports of the game for platforms other than iOS were not published by Supermono Studios, but instead were handled on Android and PSP by Gray Fin Studios and Grip Games respectively.
