= Fish Tank (video game) =

- Developer: iFun4all
- Platforms: PlayStation Portable, iOS, WiiWare
- Genre: Puzzle
- Mode: Single-player

Fish Tank is a tile-matching puzzle video game from Polish studio iFun4all. The player matches colors of fish. It combines match-three gameplay with reflex-based mechanics. The game has 23 levels and 3 difficulty settings.

== Gameplay ==
Different colors of fish swim from the left-hand side of the screen to a 5×8 grid on the right-hand side of the screen. The player controls their up and down movement and guides them into rows. Unlike most of these games, the matched groups do not automatically vanish upon reaching the minimum number in a row. Having to do it manually introduces strategy as to when player should cash in matched fish. The bigger the group, the more points it is worth, and the player also gets more points for cashing in more than one group at a time. Also complicating matters is a large number of power-ups. These drift along like the fish.

There are two modes of play (arcade mode and challenge mode), each with three different difficulty settings, easy, medium, and hard. Play is somewhat like a survival mode: choose the desired difficulty level, and try to get as many points as possible without dying. The second mode is composed of 24 different levels, each one harder than the last, with a specific number of points that need to be acquired in order to complete them. One is more suited for casual players, while the other offers a level of depth that more experienced gamers can appreciate.

In both cases, the player keeps playing until a certain number of fish are killed, but arcade mode has no goals (other than a high score), while challenge mode does—generally to reach a given score with certain factors. For instance, no power-ups, or the fish moving very slowly or quickly. Or not even allowing a single fish to die. There are 24 different challenges, and in each one players can win a different medal, depending on the final score.

== Reception ==
- Gaming XP: 8.1/10
- PSP Minis: 6.5/10
