= Pocket Gamer =

Website and magazine focused on video games

- The March 2009 issue of Your guide to... mobile games by Pocket Gamer
- Editor: Dann Sullivan
- Categories: Video games
- Publisher: Steel Media Ltd
- Founded: April 2005; 21 years ago
- Company: Steel Media
- Country: United Kingdom
- Language: English
- Website: pocketgamer.com

Pocket Gamer is a video gaming website and former print magazine that focuses on mobile, portable and handheld games. It was launched in 2005 by Steel Media Limited.

The publication covers portable and mobile gaming formats, including iPhone, iPad, Android, Nintendo Switch and others. Steel Media has created many brand spin-offs, including the industry-facing PocketGamer.biz site and a series of conferences called Pocket Gamer Connects.

== History ==
Launched in April 2005 with the subtitle 'play as you go', Pocket Gamer set out to provide professional editorial coverage of mobile and handheld gaming formats which they saw as the future of gaming. At launch the site focused on mobile phones (java and brew), the Nokia N-Gage, Nintendo's Game Boy series as well as the then newly launched Nintendo DS. They also mentioned PDAs and handheld console pretenders such as Gizmondo and the Tapwave Zodiac. The Sony PSP was added to the site soon after. When the Apple iPhone arrived in June 2007, followed by the subsequent launches of the iPod Touch in September 2007 and the App Store in July 2008, it grew to increasingly dominate the editorial agenda. The site subsequently added Nintendo 3DS, PlayStation Vita, Android, BlackBerry, Windows Phone 7, MeeGo and Palm to the roster of covered formats, although latterly it's concentrated just on iOS and Android, plus the Nintendo Switch in its portable mode.

In October 2007, Pocket Gamer launched the Pocket Gamer Guide to Mobile Games magazine. It was initially distributed bi-monthly through T-Mobile stores across the United Kingdom, with an expected circulation of 150,000 copies. A digital version of Pocket Gamer was also available on the websites of Vodafone and 3 UK. In May 2008, British company Steel Media (founders of the Pocket Gamer website) announced that it partnered with O2 to produce the Pocket Gamer Guide to Mobile Games magazine, which had an initial print run of 500,000 copies and was made available in all O2 UK stores, making O2 the 4th UK mobile network to feature the Pocket Gamer magazine. In May 2008, the magazine's circulation reached 700,000 copies, with a total audience of 1.5 million when including web and WAP readership, and syndication reviews to Vodafone live! and the Samsung Fun Club.

In May 2008, Steel Media Ltd expanded the Pocket Gamer stable with the launch of a b2b-based sister site. PocketGamer.Biz focuses on covering the business of mobile games. Steel Media Ltd also launched Quality Index which tracks review scores of leading mobile games and publishers. PocketGamer.Biz produces quarterly industry reports. Pocket Gamer launched the weekly Pocket Gamer Podcast on 1 December 2008. Ten years later in May 2018, Steel Media Ltd expanded the international reach of PocketGamer.Biz by partnering with Maysalward in Jordan to launch a b2b Arabic-language mobile gaming site, PocketGamer.me.

In October 2008, Pocket Gamer launched its first foreign edition aimed at consumers, PocketGamer.Fr, providing news and reviews on mobile and iPhone apps to a French language audience. The site grew steadily and launched its own iPhone app as well as providing syndicated content to several third party magazines. In August 2010 the site merged with number two in the market, JMobil and relaunched with a new design, new features and coverage of a wider number of platforms including Android.

In October 2018, Steel Media Ltd undertook a major redesign of Pocket Gamer and unveiled a new look for the site, its first refresh in many years. At this point the site changed to a .com domain, to reflect the site's growing international appeal, from its previous .co.uk homepage. Its publisher Steel Media was acquired by Enthusiast Gaming in 2019.

=== Past guest authors ===
- Ray Sharma
- Si Shen
- Rick Marazzani
- Tak Fung

== Recognition ==
Pocket Gamer has been listed as one of the top 100 websites by The Guardian newspaper two years running (2009 and 2010) as well as being named in The Sunday Times newspaper's Top 5 Websites for Gaming (2010). The British newspaper The Guardian at one time syndicated a list of recommended mobile games from Pocket Gamer, especially the list of recommended games for each month.
