= Incoming =

Incoming may refer to:

- Incoming (1998 video game), a 3D shooter developed by Rage Software for the PC and Dreamcast.
- Incoming (album), an album by British band Blue October, 1998
- Incoming! (2009 video game), a video game for WiiWare developed by JV Games
- Incoming (play), a 2011 play by Andrew Motion
- Incoming, a 2018 American film starring Scott Adkins
- Incoming (film), a 2024 Netflix film
