= Beer pong =

Drinking game involving ping pong balls

Drinking Game
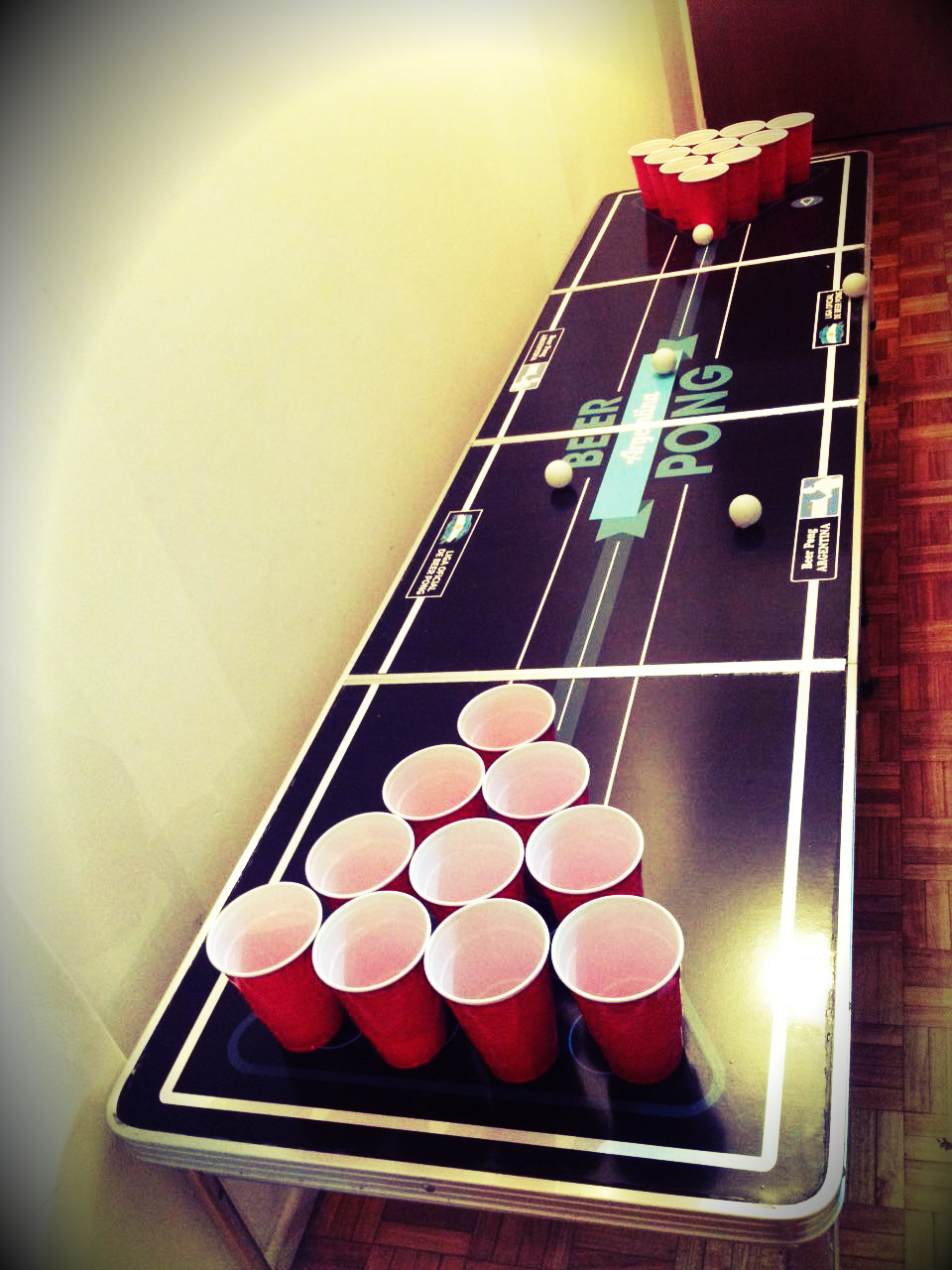
- An official beer pong table at start of play (2016)
- Other names: Beirut, Six-Cup, 10-Cups, Beer Bowling
- Players: Two teams of two players each
- Setup time: Minimal
- Playing time: 15–30 minutes
- Skills: Accuracy, hand–eye coordination
- Materials required: Table, plastic cups, ping pong balls
- Alcohol used: Beer

Beer pong, also known as Beirut, is a drinking game in which players throw a ping pong ball across a table with the intent of landing the ball in a cup of beer on the other end. The game typically consists of opposing teams of two or more players per side with 6 or 10 cups set up in a triangle formation on each side. Each team then takes turns attempting to throw ping-pong balls into the opponent's cups. If the team "makes" a cup – that is, the ball lands in it, and stays in it – the contents of the cup are consumed by the other team and the cup is removed from the table. The first team to eliminate all of the opponent's cups is the winner.

== Venues ==
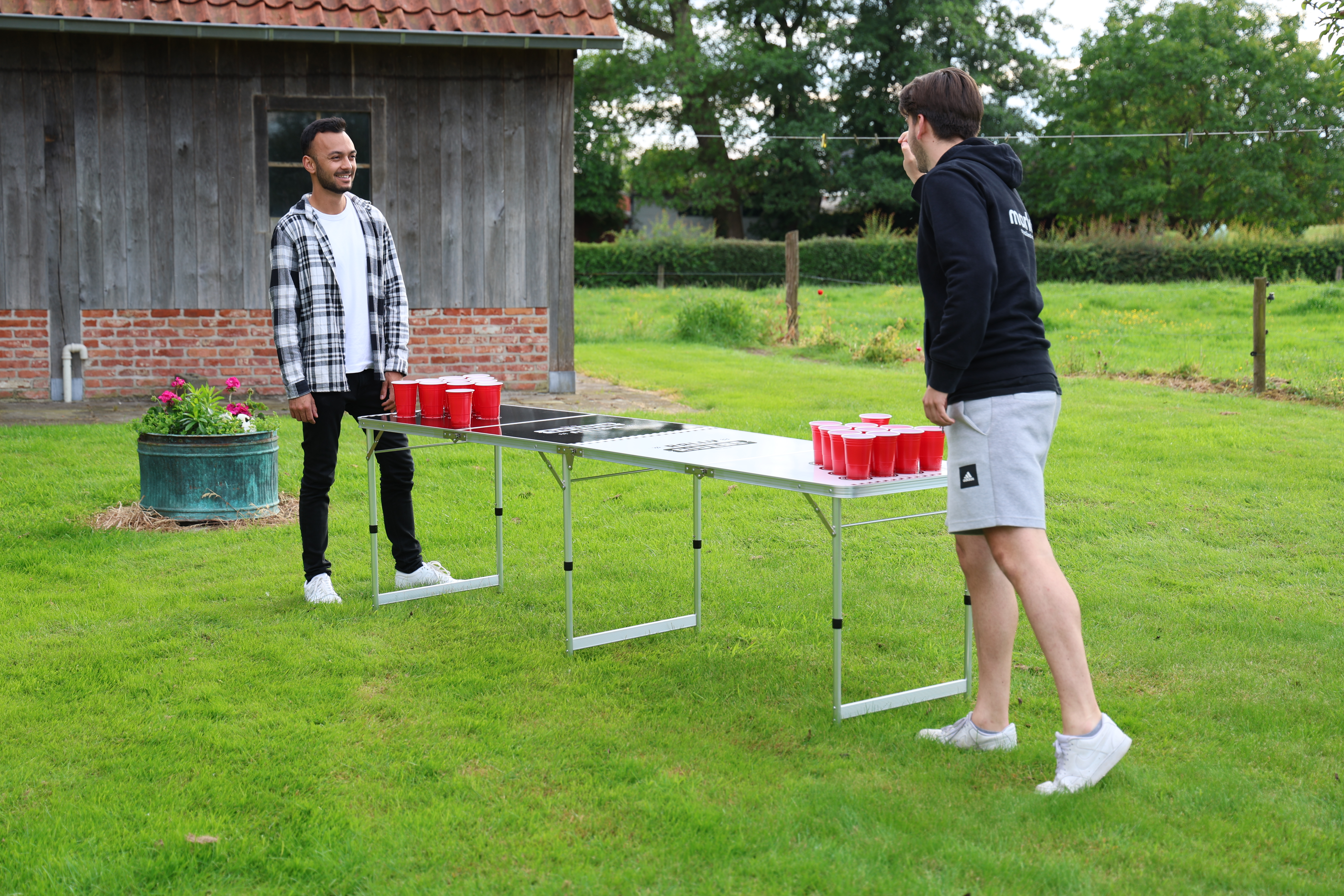
A game played in an informal setting (2024)

Beer pong is played at parties, bars, and at colleges and universities, along with other venues such as tailgating at sporting events.

== Origin and name ==
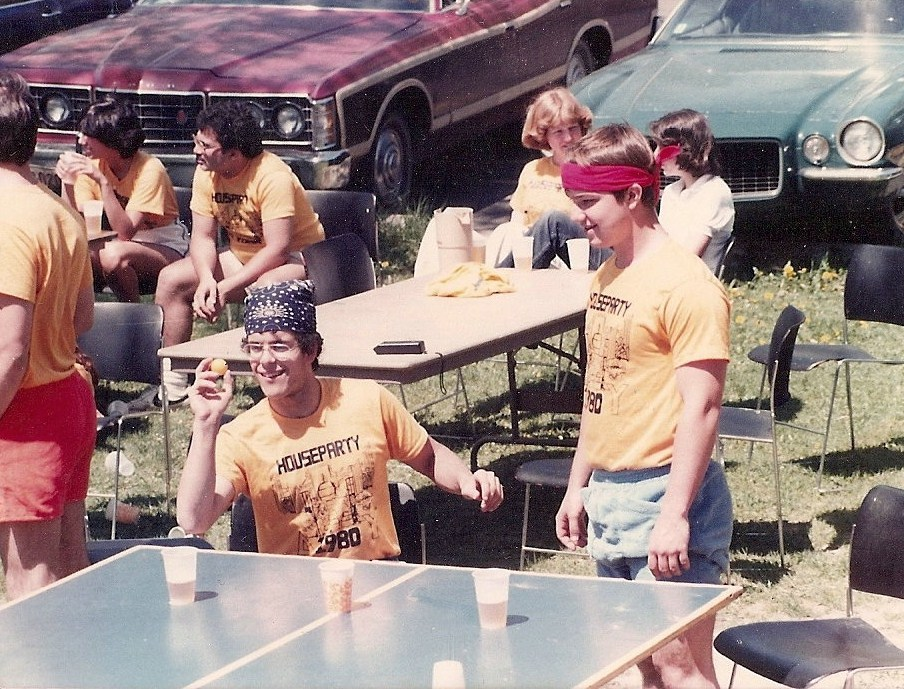
Members of Delta Upsilon playing Throw Pong at Bucknell University during the House Party weekend of 1980

The game is believed to have evolved from beer pong played with paddles which is generally regarded to have originated within the fraternities of Dartmouth College in the U.S. in the 1950s and 1960s, where it has since become part of the social culture of the campus. The first version resembled an actual ping pong game with a net and one or more cups of beer on each side of the table. Eventually, a version without paddles was invented and the names Beer Pong and Beirut were adopted in some areas of the United States sometime in the 1980s. In some places, Beer Pong refers to the version of the game with paddles, and Beirut to the version without.

Bucknell University's student-run newspaper, The Bucknellian, claims Delta Upsilon fraternity members at Bucknell created "Throw Pong", a game very similar to beer pong, during the 1970s, and that "Throw Pong" was brought to Lehigh University by fraternity brothers who visited Bucknell and this led to the creation of modern beer pong .

The origin of the name "Beirut" is disputed. A 2004 op-ed article in The Daily Princetonian, the student newspaper at Princeton University, suggested that the name was possibly coined at Bucknell or Lehigh University around the time of the Lebanese Civil War. Beirut, the capital of Lebanon, was the scene of much fighting during the war, particularly mortar fire.

== Setup ==
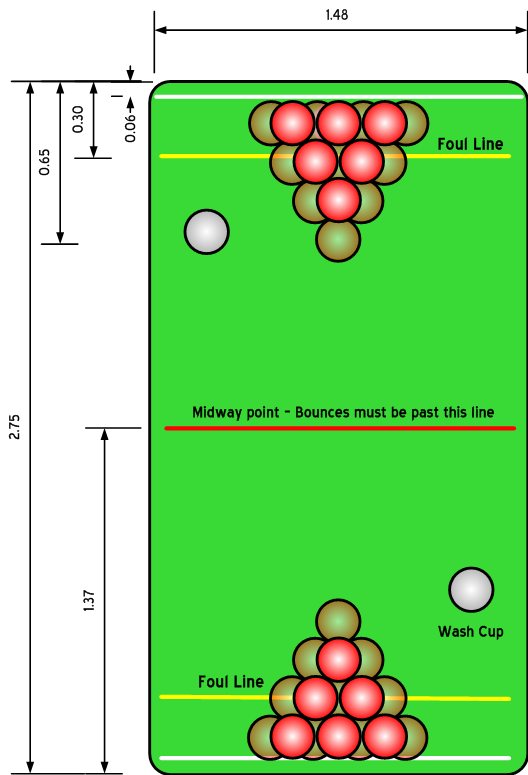
A standard set up for a game of beer pong

=== Teams ===
Beer pong is usually played with two teams of two to four players each. Each team begins the game by standing at either end of the table behind their rack of cups.

=== Playing field ===
Although the game is typically played on either a ping pong table or a folding banquet table, enthusiasts may create a personalized table for use by friends and visitors. In general, this will be a plywood board cut to proper size, sometimes painted with sports, school, or fraternity symbols and given a liquid-proof coating. Some companies sell tables, including portable and inflatable tables. However, the game can be played on any flat surface.

=== Equipment ===
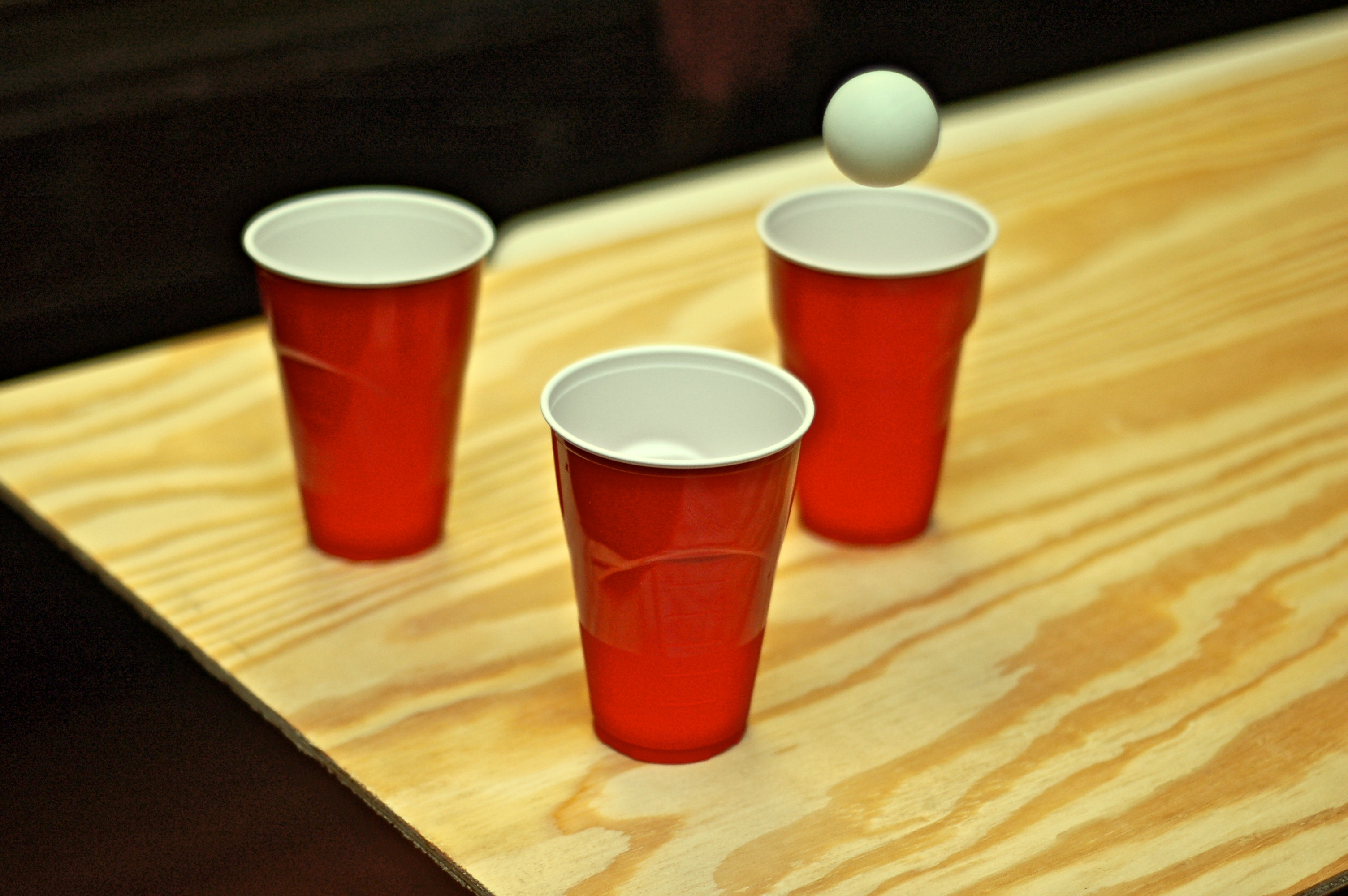
Red plastic cups are used in beer pong and other drinking games

The most common cups used are 18-US-fluid-ounce (530 ml) disposable plastic cups (such as red Solo cups) with ridge-lines which can be used precisely to measure the amount of beer to be poured into the cup. On each side of the table, teams assemble equilateral triangles with a convergence point focusing on the other team. Games typically use ten cups. Each team usually also has a separate cup of water used to rinse off the ball.

=== Alcohol ===
An inexpensive pale lager or light beer of 3.2–5% ABV is sometimes preferred because of the large quantities consumed during the course of several games. Sometimes under house rules, there might be cups of other liquors used during the game. For non-drinkers, the game may be played without beer, as is done at Utah State University, where alcohol is not allowed on campus; root beer is used instead. For sanitary reasons, the game may also be played with cups of water that players do not drink from, instead drinking from a separate cup of beer or alcohol.

== Gameplay ==
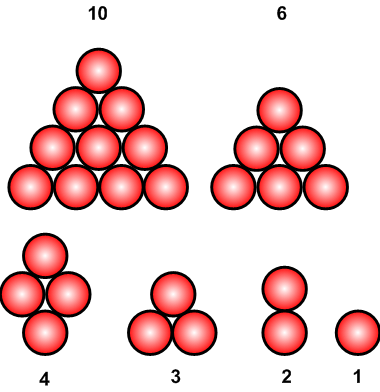
Possible beer pong re-racks

Traditionally, the game of beer pong has been played by countless variations of rule sets. In recent years, organizations such as The World Series of Beer Pong have put forth "official" rules. Typically, players abide by a uniform set of "house rules" which are often consistent within one university or region of the country (e.g. "West Coast rules") or may vary on a "house-by-house" basis. Number of cups, bouncing, re-racking, amount of alcohol, distance shots must be taken from, etc. may all vary. All house rules should be posted or verbally stated and understood by both teams before the game starts.

The order of play varies – both players on one team can shoot, followed by both players on the other team, or players on opposite teams can alternate back and forth. A cup that is made must immediately have its contents drunk and be removed from play. Some rule sets allow for "re-racking" (also known as "reforming", "rearranging", "consolidation", and other names), which is a rearrangement of a team's remaining cups after some have been removed. The formations, number of cups, when to rearrange and so on, depend on the rule set. For example, a team with three remaining cups may ask the other team to "re-rack" the cups into a single triangle formation.

Common house rules allow players to 'finger' or blow the ball out of the cup if the ball spins around the inner rim. Another common house rule states that if a team makes both shots during their turn, a 'rollback' occurs allowing each player on that team to shoot again. In the World Series of Beer Pong rules, only a single-ball 'rollback' occurs resulting in a three cup maximum that can be made per turn.

Before shooting, teams may dunk the ping pong balls into cups of water in order to wash off the balls. However, research has shown that the wash cups can still hold bacteria such as E. coli. As a result, players may put water in the cups instead of beer, keeping a separate beer on the side to drink from.

=== Shot techniques ===
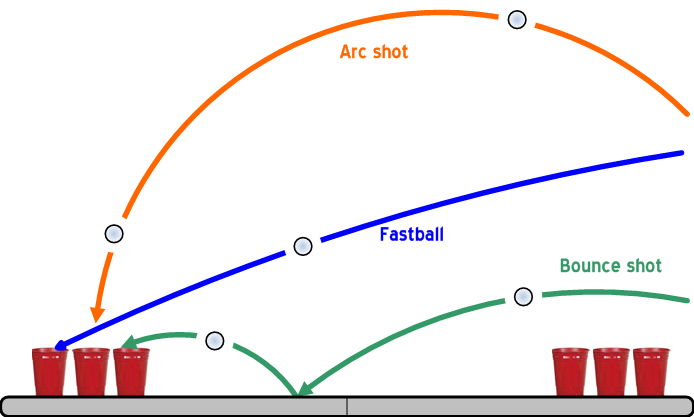
The typical path for the different kinds of shots

The most common throwing technique is the arc shot, where one grasps the ping pong ball with the tips of the thumb and forefinger, holds the arm at an angle with the ball upwards, then throws using a gentle elbow motion holding the upper arm parallel with the table.

Some players throw "fastball" style which uses more of a hard chopping motion to send the ball in a more direct line toward the intended target cup. A fastball shot may be favorable if house rules dictate that a cup knocked over is removed from the table, in which case a fastball can eliminate multiple cups if thrown hard enough.

A bounce shot is performed by bouncing the ball towards the cups. Depending on house rules, if the other team has the opportunity to swat away a bounced ball, a bounce shot may be worth more than one cup.

=== Winning the game ===
If a team makes their last cup, the other team loses unless they can make all of their remaining cups; this is called a rebuttal or redemption. If the losing team can hit their redemption shots, then the game is forced into overtime where three cups are used instead of the normal ten cups.

Another 'house rule' can be stated before or during the game in the midst of a shutout. A shutout in beer pong occurs if one team makes all ten of their cups and the opposite team makes none of their cups. If the shutout does occur, the losing team must do whatever the two teams decided on, such as going streaking (naked lap) or drinking a large quantity of beer.

Also depending on 'house rules', there are other ways to end the game. Cups that were accidentally left in the rack after being made are known as death/kill cups. These cups will immediately end the game if made again.

== Health concerns ==
The game may have several associated health risks. As with any activity involving alcohol, beer pong may cause players to become drunken or even intoxicated enough to suffer alcohol poisoning. Some writers have mentioned beer pong as contributing to "out of control" college drinking.

The supposed cleansing effect of the water "dunk" cup may be offset by bacteria in the cups. During the COVID-19 pandemic, a group of young people in Denmark were thought to have contracted the virus as a result of playing a version of the game where they held the table tennis balls in their mouths and spat them into the cups.

== Legal restrictions ==
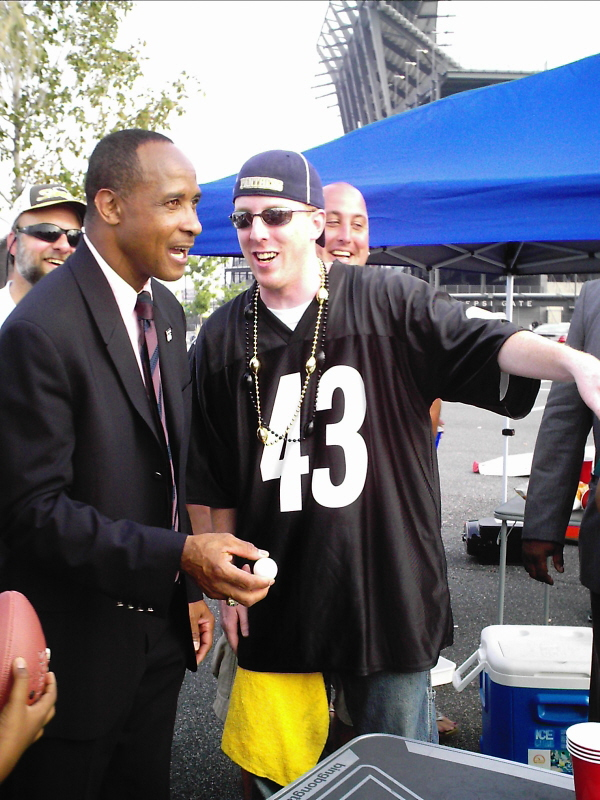
Former Pittsburgh Steeler and Pennsylvania Governor candidate Lynn Swann plays beer pong with tailgaters before a football game in 2006.

Some municipalities and states have attempted to ban beer pong from bars or in general because of the belief that it encourages binge drinking (see Health concerns above). In Oxford, Ohio, where Miami University is located, the city council tried to ban the game from being played outdoors. In Arlington, Virginia and Champaign-Urbana, Illinois, bar owners were told to stop allowing the game to be played in their establishments. In the fall of 2007, Georgetown University officially banned all beer pong paraphernalia such as custom-built tables and the possession of many ping-pong balls.

Time magazine ran an article on July 31, 2008, "The War Against Beer Pong", which noted legal restrictions and bans on the game in colleges and elsewhere.

In many states, players have taken to placing water in cups to hold organized beer pong tournaments legally in bars. Some examples can be found in Michigan, Massachusetts, North Carolina, and Pennsylvania.

== Tournaments and leagues ==
Beer pong tournaments are held in the United States at the local, regional, and national levels.

The World Series of Beer Pong (WSOBP) is the largest beer pong tournament in the world. WSOBP IV, held in January 2009 at the Flamingo Hotel and Casino in Las Vegas, Nevada, had a $50,000 grand prize and over 800 participants from the US and Canada. WSOBP V, held in January 2010, had over 1,000 participants including teams from Ireland, Scotland, Germany and Japan. The World Beer Pong Tour has stops in various cities and cash prizes as well.

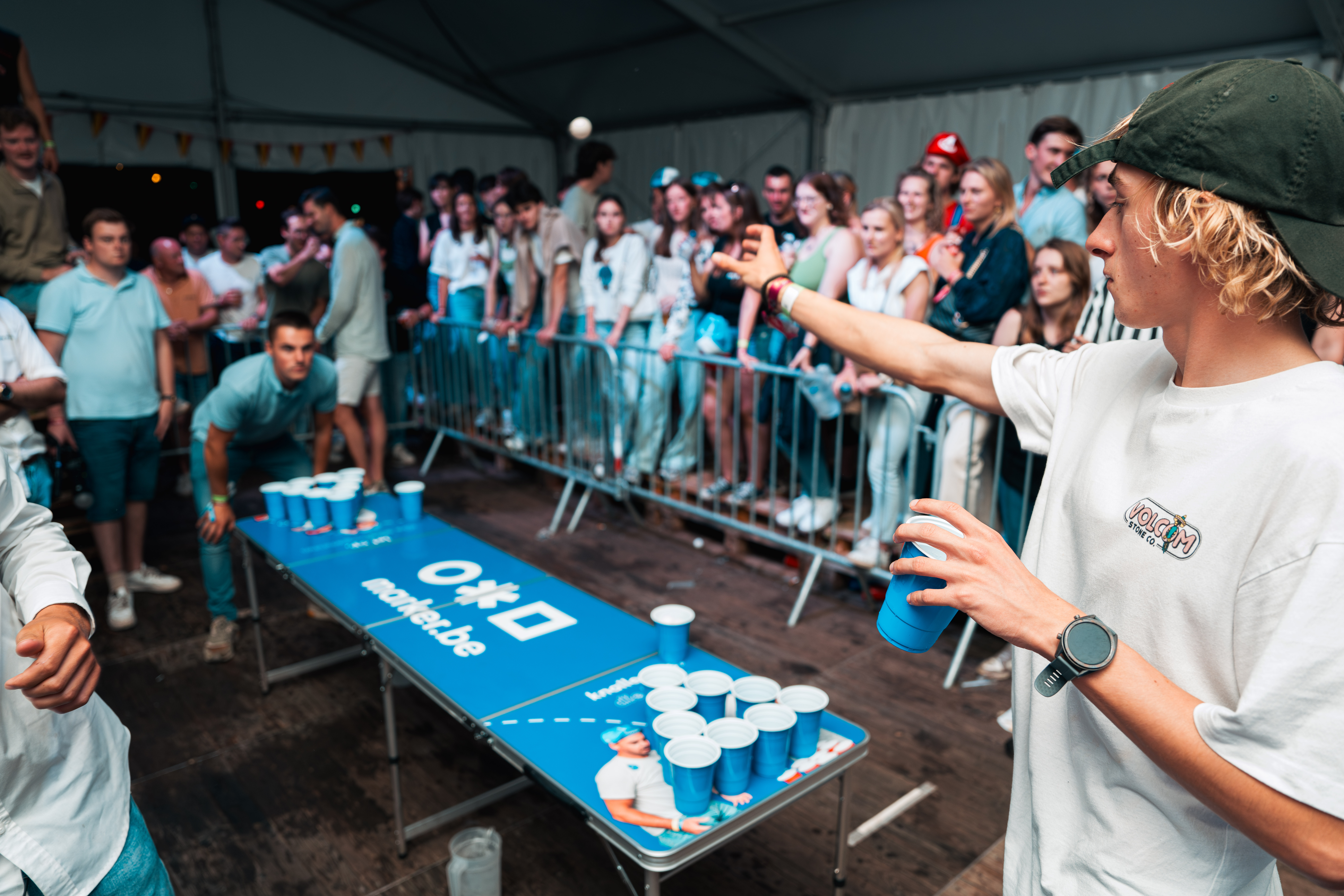
A beer pong match during the Belgian championships 2024

In Belgium, the official Belgian Beer Pong Championship, also known as the Belgian Series of Beer Pong, stands as the nation’s recognized championship event for the sport of beer pong. Held annually since 2014 at the Beats n' Bots festival in Lichtervelde, this event is widely regarded as Belgium’s national tournament, with official rules and significant media coverage each year. In the beer-loving culture of Belgium, the national championship has established itself as a sporting event, drawing top teams from across the country and a growing, diverse audience.

A more common organization of beer pong games are leagues which operate on a local or regional level. Ordinarily, a group of pong enthusiasts will create teams (partnerships) and play weekly against each other. Sometimes, the leagues have websites, rankings and statistics, while others have been started by college students with the goal of intramural competition such as at University of California, Santa Barbara with the "Isla Vista Beer Pong League", and at New York University.

== Media ==
The Wall Street Journal, Time and other media outlets have reported on the increase in businesses selling beer pong paraphernalia, such as tables, mats, cups, or clothes. Last Cup: Road to the World Series of Beer Pong is a documentary which follows some competitive players as they prepare for the WSOBP II and ultimately compete against one another for the $20,000 grand prize. This documentary, directed by Dan Lindsay, premiered at the CineVegas film festival on June 13, 2008. Rick Reilly wrote an entire column about The World Series of Beer Pong IV for ESPN The Magazine.

The Associated Press cited the game and other drinking games as a factor in deaths of college students.

Time magazine recently had an article on the popularity of beer pong and posted a video on their website. In both, players claimed beer pong was a sport, rather than a game—similar to billiards and darts.

The game has been a recurring segment on Late Night with Jimmy Fallon, with host Fallon playing against female celebrity guests such as Betty White, Serena Williams, Anna Kournikova, Charlize Theron and Jessica Alba.

The Colbert Report featured a segment on the CDC study hoax.

Road Trip: Beer Pong, a sequel to the 2000 comedy Road Trip, featured the game prominently. Agnes Scott College, where most of the movie was filmed, did not want to be listed in the credits after complaints from students.

=== Publishing ===
On August 29, 2009, Chronicle Books published The Book of Beer Pong, a 200-page fully illustrated guide to the game.

=== Bud pong ===
Bud pong was the branded version of beer pong that brewer Anheuser-Busch said involved the drinking of water, not Budweiser or any other beer. In the summer of 2005, the company began marketing "bud pong" kits to its distributors. Francine I. Katz, vice president for communications and consumer affairs, was reported in The New York Times as saying that bud pong was not intended for underage drinkers because promotions were held in bars, not on campuses. And it did not promote binge drinking, she said, because official rules call for water to be used, not beer.

The New York Times quoted a bartender at a club near Clemson University as saying she had worked at several bud pong events and had "never seen anyone playing with water. It's always beer. It's just like any other beer pong."

Some expressed incredulity at Anheuser-Busch's public statements. Henry Wechsler, director of the College Alcohol Study at the Harvard School of Public Health, said: "Why would alcohol companies promote games that involve drinking water? It's preposterous," while advertising news site Adjab opined that "someone playing bud pong with water is about as likely as a teenage kid using the rolling paper he bought at the convenience store to smoke tobacco."

However, the practice of playing with water has become increasingly common on college campuses, due to hygienic concerns of sharing cups with previous players. Using water in game cups also prevents players from needing to drink each scored cup. Instead of drinking the beer from a glass each time a player sinks a shot, the player simply takes a shot of liquor or a sip from their own drink each time the opposing team scores. This addresses concerns about binge drinking being part of the game. This can also help when there isn't enough beer to accommodate a large number of games during the party.

=== Video games ===
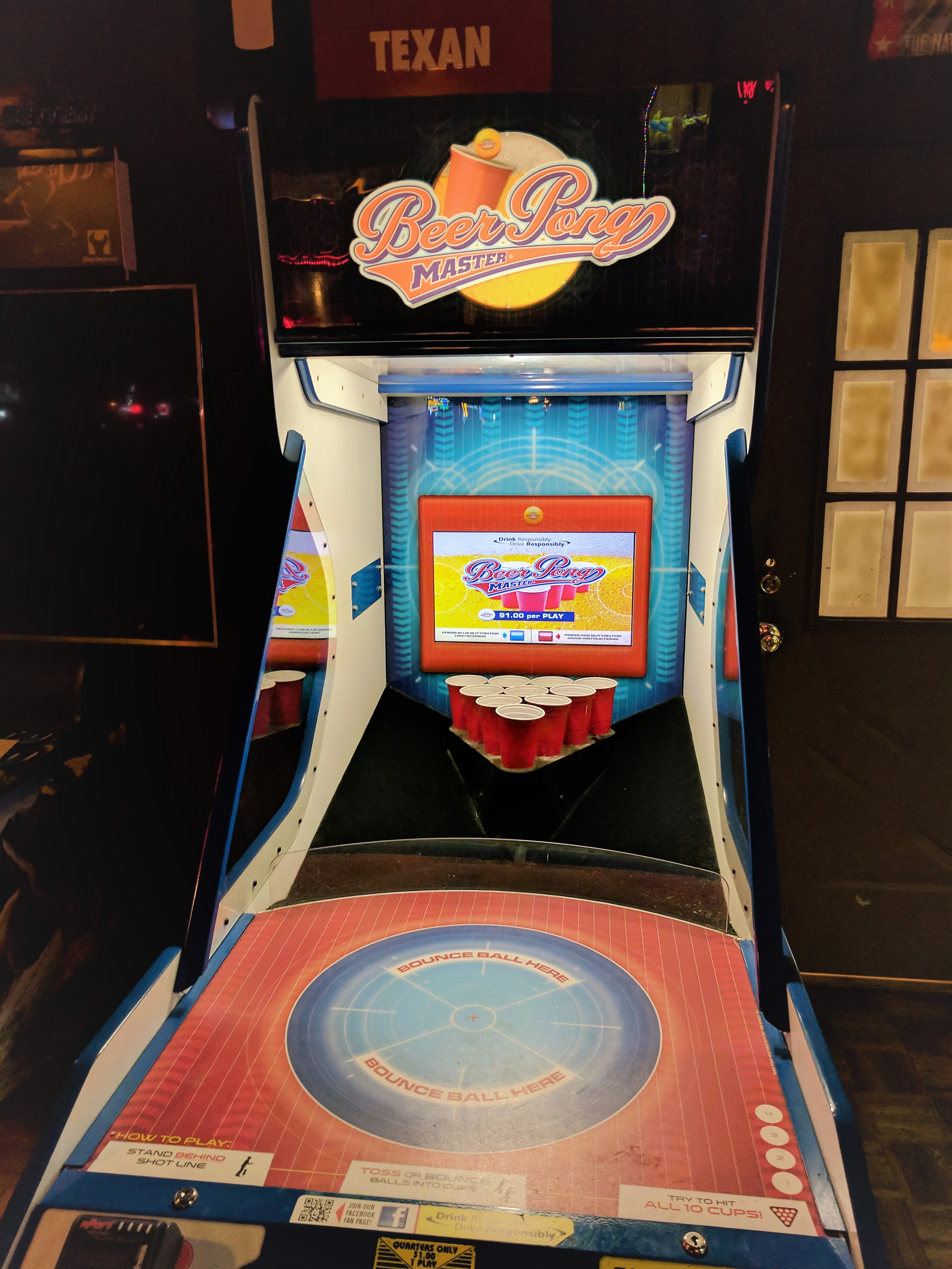
The Beer Pong Master arcade machine

In July 2008, JV Games Inc. released a downloadable video game for the Wii console called Frat Party Games: Beer Pong. The ESRB rated it suitable for ages 13 and up, but after this was questioned by Connecticut's attorney general, the game was renamed Frat Party Games: Pong Toss and all references to alcohol were removed.

In 2013, a Beer Pong Master arcade machine was launched by Bay Tek Games, where players throw balls into empty plastic cups at the far end of the machine, attempting to extinguish their electric lights. The next year, Bay Tek released a family entertainment variant called Sink It, where it shares the same purpose, but awards tickets after the game session.

In 2025, the game "The Alters" was released featuring a minigame where the main character could play "Beerpong".

== See also ==
- List of drinking games
