= Belgian Beer Pong Championship =

Belgian Series of Beerpong Beats n' Bots.
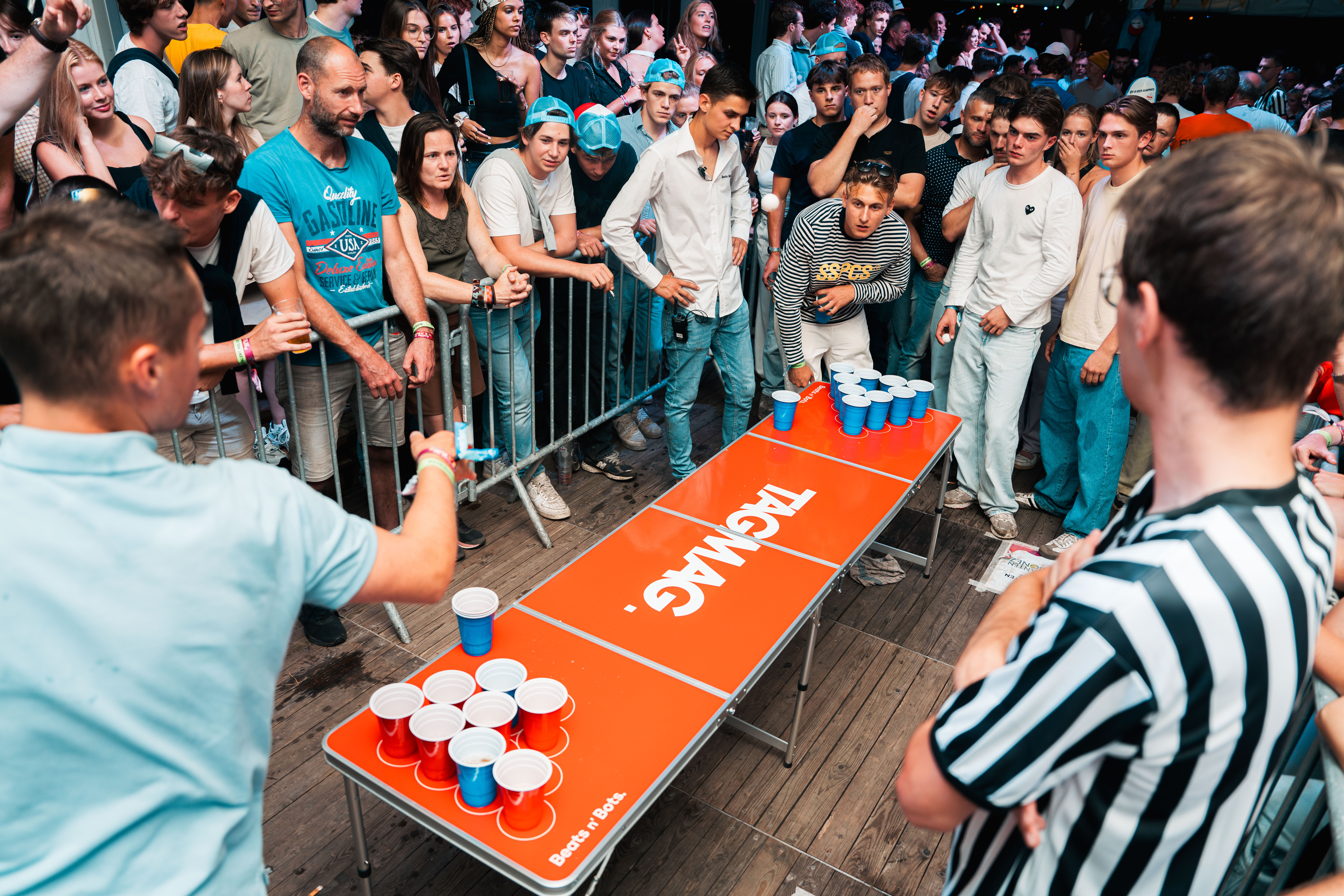
- The 2024 ‘Belgian Beer Pong Championships’ during Beats n' Bots in Lichtervelde, Belgium.
- Nickname: BK Beerpong
- Genre: sports tournament, music festival
- Date: Every first Saturday in September
- Frequency: Annual
- Location: Lichtervelde
- Country: Belgium
- Years active: 10
- Inaugurated: 2014
- Participants: 256
- Attendance: 1500
- Capacity: 2500
- Organiser: Beats n' Bots.
- Website: http://www.beatsnbots.be/

The Belgian Beer Pong Championship (Belgian Series of Beer Pong) is an annual tournament in Belgium dedicated to the drinking game of beer pong. In 2025, the event grew to become the largest beer pong tournament in Western Europe, with 336 players.

== History ==
Beer pong originated in the United States, where it gained popularity among students. In Belgium, the game’s appeal surged in recent years, leading to the establishment of the Belgian Beer Pong Championship in 2014, initially hosted in Antwerp. The tournament quickly gained traction, drawing attention from local media and communities. However, in 2022, Antwerp's city council banned the championship due to concerns over public alcohol consumption and associated disturbances. This ban ignited debates regarding alcohol regulations at public events.

After the ban in Antwerp, the Belgian Beer Pong Championship was moved to Lichtervelde, where it was held in 2023 at the Beats n' Bots festival. The organizers hoped that this move would not only circumvent the ban, but also refresh the image of the championship and refocus attention on sportsmanship. The championship in Lichtervelde ultimately welcomed 256 participants from all corners of Belgium.

In 2024, 256 participants took part again. Registrations were fully booked within five days. The edition received extra media attention due to the participation of local politicians and an incident in which a large inflatable promotional item for the Tout Bien beer brand, linked to Average Rob, was stolen.

The 2025 edition grew to become the largest beer pong tournament in Western Europe: 336 participants from 76 Belgian cities and municipalities, with international registrations from the Netherlands, Italy, and Denmark, and a participation capacity that sold out within 32 minutes.

In 2025, the duo De Biertonnekes, consisting of Anthony Rousseau (Aarschot) and Wesley Simons (Rillaar), won the Belgian title after a 10-9 victory in the decisive match. They thus became the successors to the 2024 champions, Nelis Himpe and Yakari Pickavet.

== Honours list ==
- 2025: Team 'De Biertonnekes' (Anthony Rousseau and Wesley Simons)
- 2024: Team 'On met la Patate!' (Nelis Himpe and Yakari Pyckavet)
- 2023: Team 'Jh De Komeet' (Maxime Debruyne and Axl Loyson)
- 2019: Team 'In de kakker van Roos Van Acker' (Def Fossez and Bryan Pyncket)
- 2018: Team 'KURT' (Arne Cazaerck and Steven Comeye), who represented Belgium at the European Series of Beer Pong in Innsbruck, Austria.
