= Towers II: Plight of the Stargazer =

1995 video game

- Original Atari Falcon manual cover
- Developer: JV Enterprises
- Publishers: JV Enterprises: Falcon; NA: JV Enterprises; EU: Goodman International; Jaguar; NA/EU: Telegames Windows; NA/EU: Intermark Corporation, Telegames
- Designer: Jag Jaeger
- Programmer: Vince Valenti
- Artists: John Easton; Vince Valenti
- Composer: Eric L. Richardson
- Series: Towers
- Platforms: Atari Falcon; Atari Jaguar; Windows
- Release: Falcon; NA: 1995; Jaguar; NA/EU: December 10, 1996; Windows; NA: November 1, 1997
- Genre: Role-playing
- Mode: Single-player

Towers II: Plight of the Stargazer is a first-person role-playing video game originally developed and published by JV Enterprises for the Atari Falcon in 1995. It is the sequel to Towers: Lord Baniff's Deceit, which was first released as a shareware title on the Atari ST in 1993 and later ported to MS-DOS and Game Boy Color.

Set several months after the events of the original game, the story follows the original crew of four adventurers from the previous title after landing in Lamini, who are now tasked by people of the island to send one of their crew to stop Lord Daggan inside his tower, after becoming enraged with the questioning of his doings. Initially released as a commercial title before becoming a shareware release for the Atari Falcon, Towers II: Plight of the Stargazer was later ported for the Atari Jaguar on December 10, 1996, becoming one of the last licensed releases by Telegames for the system after being discontinued by Atari Corporation, who merged with JT Storage in a reverse takeover. It later received a port for Windows that was co-published by Intermark Corporation and Telegames on November 1, 1997.

Towers II: Plight of the Stargazer received positive reception since its release on Atari Falcon, with praise towards the 3D graphics, music and length but was criticized for its minimal story, puzzles and repetitive gameplay. The Jaguar version also received positive reception for the gameplay and controls, while being criticized for its low-res graphics. As the Jaguar version was only available through direct order and a few select retailers, this port has since become an expensive collector's item.

== Gameplay ==
Gameplay from the Falcon version. While in Hand mode, players can interact with the environment, pick up objects lying on the ground, talk to NPCs and more. Weapon equipment is done by pressing an arrow at the bottom right of the character's portrait.

Towers II: Plight of the Stargazer is a role-playing video game (RPG) that takes place from a first-person perspective, similar to other games in the genre such as Ultima Underworld: The Stygian Abyss and King's Field, in a three-dimensional environment with pre-rendered 3D sprites. The main objective of the player is to adventure through a large, multi-level castle tower in which the entire game is set and defeat Lord Daggan. The player uses a freely movable mouse cursor to interact with the environment and with the icon-based interface on the heads-up display (HUD) when not engaged in combat.

The progression of the player through the game is linear, with puzzles and secrets to be found scattered within certain walls of the tower. An automatically filling map, that can be accessed by pressing its respective button during gameplay, keeps track of the player's finding through their gameplay session. Before starting, players can choose between any of the four characters at the beginning of the game, each one with their own class but skills statistics are randomly assigned and can be changed by rerolling them again until its suitable for the player. Players can save their progress at any time during gameplay and resume on the main menu.

Enemies are encountered inside the tower, with battles taking place in real-time when players are engaging in combat and they can use either a melee or ranged attack with their currently equipped weapon and a magic attack, which drains its dedicated mana meter and no further action is possible until the meter is fully filled again. Weapons, armors, shields, magic scrolls and other items can be either found from killing enemy non-playable characters (NPCs) or lying on the ground during exploration. At the beginning, the player starts with a limited inventory space that can be further expanded by picking up either backpacks or bags.

Some NCPs can be talked when not engaged in combat and they can give hints about puzzles found in later levels of the tower. By participating in combat, the player's character gains experience points and when certain amounts of experience points are accumulated, their character levels up, gaining additional hit points and mana. Foods found inside the tower also plays an important role in gameplay, as the player's character can feel hunger and if they do not use the food on their character's portrait, will lead a change in the in-game movement of their character as a result. Rest also plays an equally important role as well, since players can recover hit points by sleeping anywhere on the tower but they can also be attacked by any of the enemies.

== Plot ==
Towers II: Plight of the Stargazer takes place several months after the events occurred in Towers: Lord Baniff's Deceit. After shipwrecking in the island of Lamini, also known as the Land of Towers, reparations on the four-men crew's ship are almost ready but they have not heard info in regards to the wars at Airatose or anything else besides the island's current state, giving them an uncomfortable feeling about the location and their most powerful residents being magic wielders. Rumors of the island's guards not returning from a quest started and the crew was asked to see the new sheriff on Lamini. Upon arriving at the sheriff's office, an old man enters and sits down on a desk, and the crew exchange dialogue with him. The old man starts to tell a story about Lord Daggan, who was previously an astronomer of good nature and high status that made multiple discoveries, but resigned to his commission one day and strange events followed afterwards. When people of the island questioned about his recent actions inside his tower, he became enraged and the people quickly considered him a madman that had to be stopped, with knights and sages of the island being tasked for the assignment but never returned. Thieves were later spotted leaving the tower of Lord Daggan with stolen property, with one being captured and interrogated for his actions. The captured theft's statements of the decaying state, low security and mystical beings inside the tower left them bewildered. As a result, the four men are asked in sending one of their crew to complete the task of stopping Lord Daggan, with treasures inside the tower and a keep being compensations for the job done, before Lord Daggan grows in both madness and power.

== Development and release ==
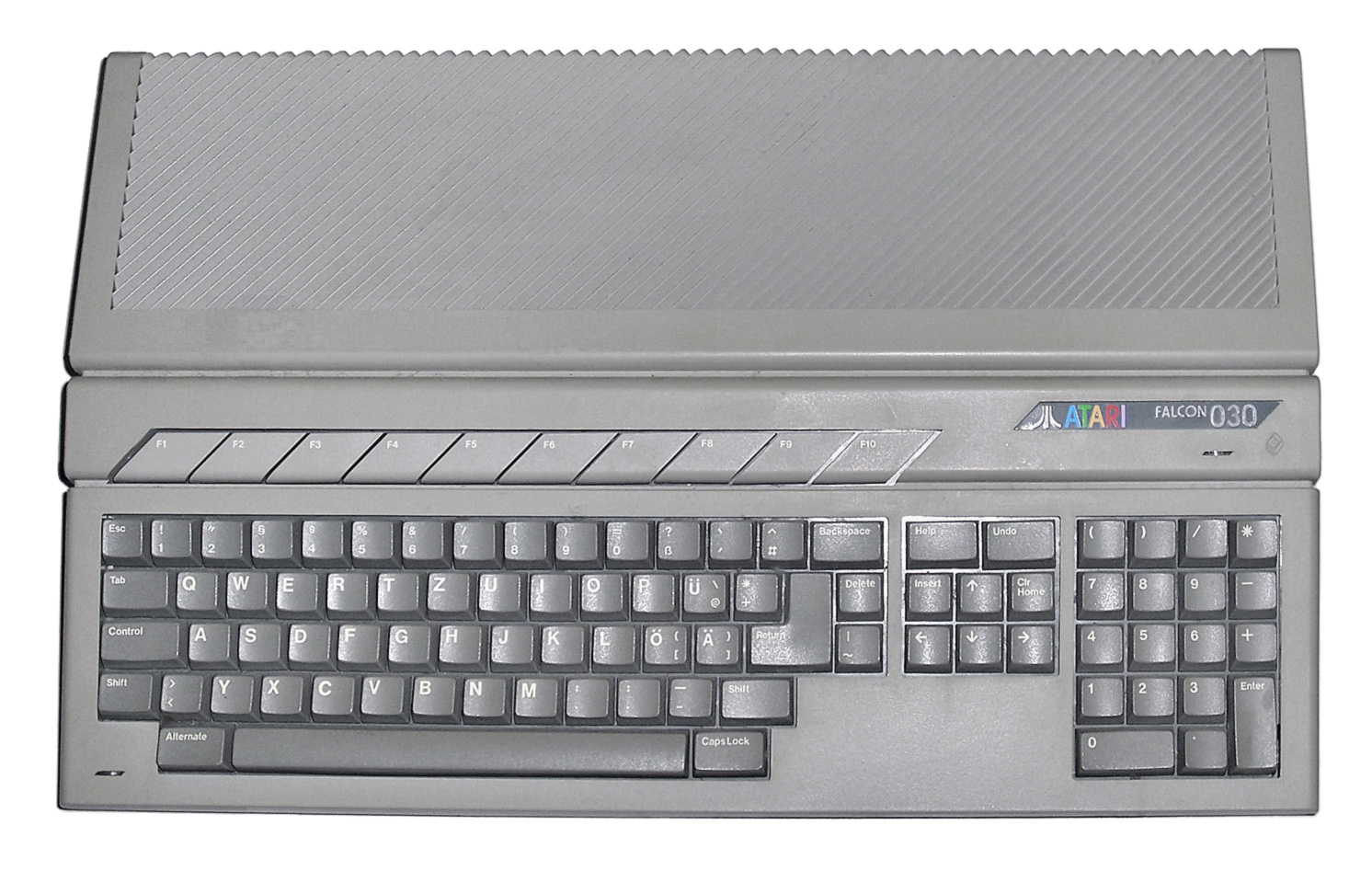
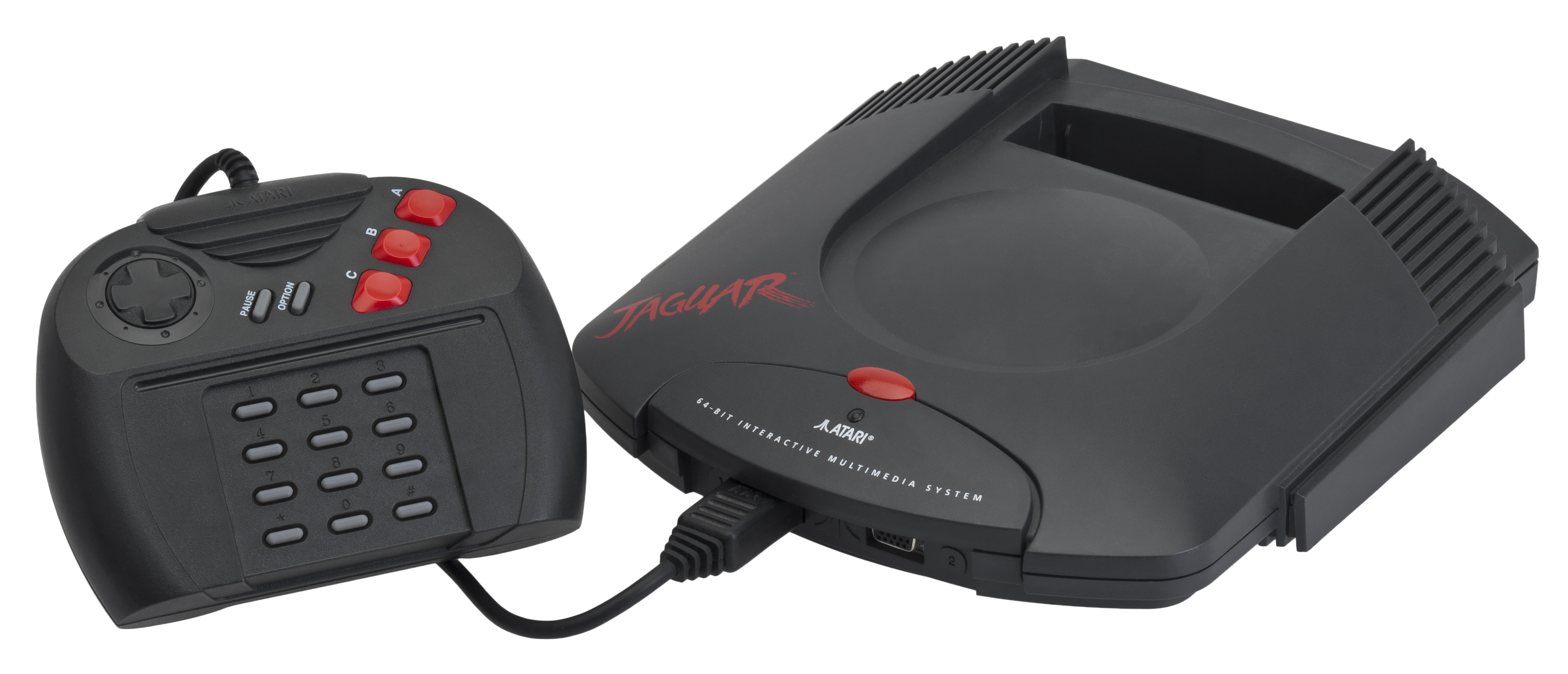
Though developed for the Atari Falcon, Towers II: Plight of the Stargazer was designed around the technical specifications of the Jaguar, with the main reason being for a then-possible port of the game to the system with minimal technical issues in the process.

JV Enterprises was founded and established in the 1990s on Paradise, Nevada by Vince Valenti and Jag Jaeger primarily as a partnership concentrating on shareware titles for Atari Corporation and PC platforms. When developing Towers II: Plight of the Stargazer, Vince and Jag realized they could not handle all the work by themselves and decided to expand the development team to assist with work on the game, including composer Eric L. Richardson and artist John Easton. The project was first developed for the Atari Falcon and spent nine months in development, but was designed around the Jaguar's technical specifications if the team decided to port it to the system. Vince worked as the main programmer of the game, with Jag handling the design alongside the map and puzzle layouts, while Eric composed the music. John designed both the characters and creatures, with Vince later modeling them as pre-rendered 3D sprites.

After finishing development and releasing the Falcon version of Towers II: Plight of the Stargazer in 1995, Vince and his team started porting the game to the Jaguar in a process of six months with minimal problems. Due to the system's superior hardware, the team managed to make improvements in the visuals, such as full-screen graphics, more textures for the tower's inside surroundings and fitting the game on a two-megabyte (MB) cartridge compared to the Falcon's four MB disk size, among other changes. The Jaguar version also runs approximately at 12 frames per second, in addition of featuring support for the ProController. Like other games published by Telegames following the Jaguar's discontinuation in 1996, the Jaguar version of Towers II was only available through direct order or retailers such as Electronics Boutique, and has since become an expensive collector's item due to its rarity.

Towers II: Plight of the Stargazer also received a port for Windows that was co-published by Intermark Corporation and Telegames on October 13, 1997. Versions for both Game Boy Color and Game Boy Advance were in development by JV Games and Vatical Entertainment respectively but ultimately were never released, though cover art of both ports do exist.

== Reception ==
Reception

Review scores
| Publication | Score |
|---|---|
| AllGame | (Jaguar) 3/5 |
| Jaguar Explorer Online | (Jaguar) 4/5 |
| Atari World | (Falcon) 7/10 |
| GamePro | (Jaguar) 12.5 / 20 |
| ST-Computer | (Jaguar) 80% |
| ST Format | (Falcon) 93% |
| Video Games | (Jaguar) 3/5 |

Towers II: Plight of the Stargazer received positive reception since its release.

In 2023, Time Extension listed it as one of the best games for the Jaguar.
