= Towers: Lord Baniff's Deceit =

1993 video game

- Developer: JV Enterprises
- Publishers: JV Enterprises; Game Boy Color: NA: Vatical Entertainment; EU: Telegames
- Series: Towers
- Platforms: Atari ST, MS-DOS, Game Boy Color
- Release: Atari ST: NA: 1993; MS-DOS: NA: 1994; Game Boy Color: NA: June 13, 2000; EU: 2000
- Genre: Role-playing
- Modes: Single-player, multiplayer

Towers: Lord Baniff's Deceit is a first-person role-playing video game originally developed and published by JV Enterprises for the Atari ST in 1993. It is the first entry in the Towers series. In the game, players assume the role of adventurers tasked with finding Lord Baniff in his Tower, who has not been heard from by the people of Lamini. The title was later ported to both MS-DOS and Game Boy Color, each featuring various differences compared to the original release. It was met with mixed reception from critics across all platforms. A sequel, Towers II: Plight of the Stargazer, was released in 1995 for the Atari Falcon.

== Gameplay ==
Atari ST version screenshot.

Towers: Lord Baniff's Deceit is a role-playing video game (RPG) that takes place from a first-person perspective similar to other games in the genre such as Dungeon Master in a three-dimensional environment. Players navigate through a large, multi-level castle tower in which the entire game is set to find Lord Baniff. A freely movable mouse cursor is used to interact with the environment and the icon-based interface on the heads-up display (HUD) when not engaged in combat. On every version of the title, up to two players can play co-op via link-up.

Progression of through the game is linear, with puzzles and secrets to be found scattered within the tower. Before starting, players can choose between any of the four characters at the beginning of the game, each one with their own class. Players can save their progress at any time during gameplay and resume on the main menu. Enemy encounters occur in real-time when players engage in combat and they can use either a melee or ranged attack with their currently equipped weapon and magic attacks, which drains its mana meter and no further action is possible until the meter is fully filled again. Weapons, armors, shields, magic scrolls and other items can be either found from killing enemy non-playable characters (NPCs) or lying on the ground during exploration. At the beginning, the player starts with a limited inventory space that can be further expanded by picking up bags. By participating in combat, the player's character gains experience points and when certain amounts of experience points are accumulated, their character levels up, gaining additional hit points and mana.

== Plot ==
During their journey to help in a battle against Sargon, a crew of four adventurers encounter a storm that opens a hole in their ship but managed to reach Lamini safely, also known as the Land of Towers. The people of Lamini offer help to repair the damaged ship and the adventuring crew meet with the Mayor of the town during their lookout for a job, as the Mayor is in need of messengers. The Mayor tells that Lord Baniff has not been heard from in weeks and the crew needs to search him on his tower to bring word of his current condition. After entering the Baniff's tower, the entrance doorway collapses, forcing the crew to find their way out.

== Release ==
Towers: Lord Baniff's Deceit was first released for the Atari ST in 1993 by JV Enterprises. The game was then ported to MS-DOS computers in 1994. The title was also later ported to the Game Boy Color in June 2000, featuring battery save support.

== Reception ==
Reception

Aggregate score
Aggregator	Score
GameRankings	(GBC) 44.80%

Review scores
Publication	Score
GameSpot	(GBC) 4.3 /10
IGN	(GBC) 4.0/10
Nintendo Power	(GBC) 5.3/10
Pockett Videogames	(GBC) 2/5
ST Format	(ST) 80%

Towers: Lord Baniff's Deceit was met with mixed reception from critics and reviewers alike since its release.

== Legacy ==
A sequel, titled Towers II: Plight of the Stargazer was launched in 1994 for the Atari Falcon and was later ported to the Atari Jaguar and Microsoft Windows.
