= Back Track =

2001 video game

- Developer(s): Telegames (Windows); JV Games (GBA)
- Publisher(s): Telegames
- Platform(s): Microsoft Windows, Game Boy Advance
- Release: 2001: Windows; NA: 2002 or 2003 Game Boy Advance; NA: October 4, 2001; PAL: November 23, 2001
- Genre(s): First-person shooter
- Mode(s): Single-player, multiplayer

Back Track is a first-person shooter that was released for Windows in 2003 or 2002 and for Game Boy Advance in 2001. It is notable for being the first 3D shooter to be released on the Game Boy Advance (along with Doom).

== Story ==
Domingoaniax, an evil alien, has built up a large invasion force on the dark side of the Moon. The player assumes the role of special agent Jim Track, who has to rescue the 110 kidnapped humans and defeat Domingoaniax's droid army.

== Game Boy Advance version ==
=== Multiplayer ===
BackTrack's multiplayer mode has six deathmatch arenas, each playable as a standard 20-point deathmatch or as a 4-point round-robin. Both modes support up to four players via a link cable.

=== Reception ===
Reception was mixed. Nintendo Power felt the game came close to a "bull's-eye". They enjoyed the smooth movement and scrolling. The best feature was its multiplier modes. Nintendo Power gave it a 4 out of 5.

IGN praised the game for its solid framerate, but noted that the story at times "Doesn't work", and that the humor was "groan-worthy". The game was panned in the press for being mediocre in comparison with other FPS games released around the same time. It had an average rating of 56% on GameRankings.

== Reviews ==
- Pocket Magazine / Pockett Videogames
- All Game Guide
- GameSpot
