= Incoming! (2009 video game) =

- Developer: JV Games
- Publisher: JV Games
- Platform: Wii (WiiWare)
- Release: NA: July 13, 2009
- Genre: Action
- Modes: Single-player, multiplayer

Incoming! is a video game for WiiWare developed by JV Games. It was released in North America on July 13, 2009.

== Gameplay ==
Players control a row of tanks, and must destroy their opponent's tanks by firing back at them. Using the pointer function of the Wii Remote, players set the angle and power of their shots, and also shoot down missiles and power-ups that rain down from the sky.

The game features a single player campaign and a head to head two player mode.

== Reception ==
Reception

Review scores
Publication	Score
IGN	4.1/10
Nintendo Life	1/10

Incoming! received negative reviews from critics.

Philip J. Reed of Nintendo Life gave the game a score 1 out of 10 stars, saying that it was an "all time low for JV Games" and calling the gameplay "absolutely reprehensible" with "horrible" controls, though he had some more positive comments about the graphics. Daemon Hatfield of IGN gave the game a score of 4.1/10, praising the sound effects and saying that it was better than JV Games' previous game, Pong Toss! Frat Party Games, but still criticizing the game for its graphics, controls, and presentation.
