= Christmas Clix =

2009 video game

- Developers: MunsieGames; JV Games
- Publisher: JV Games (Wii)
- Platforms: Macintosh, Wii, Windows
- Release: November 30, 2009

Christmas Clix is a Christmas-themed puzzle game available for the Wii's download service WiiWare, and for the Mac and PC. Co-developed by American studios MunsieGames and JV Games, Inc. it was released on November 30, 2009.

The game is based on a match 3 puzzler with several twists, noted as an "arcade puzzler." There are power-ups that Santa gives you to help you along the way, you can be awarded a mini-game. There are 100 levels and 10 mini games to unlock.

== Reception ==
Christmas Clix received favorable reviews for its unique and in-depth gameplay. Nintendo Life has given it a 7 of 10 rating.
