= JV Games =

American video game developer

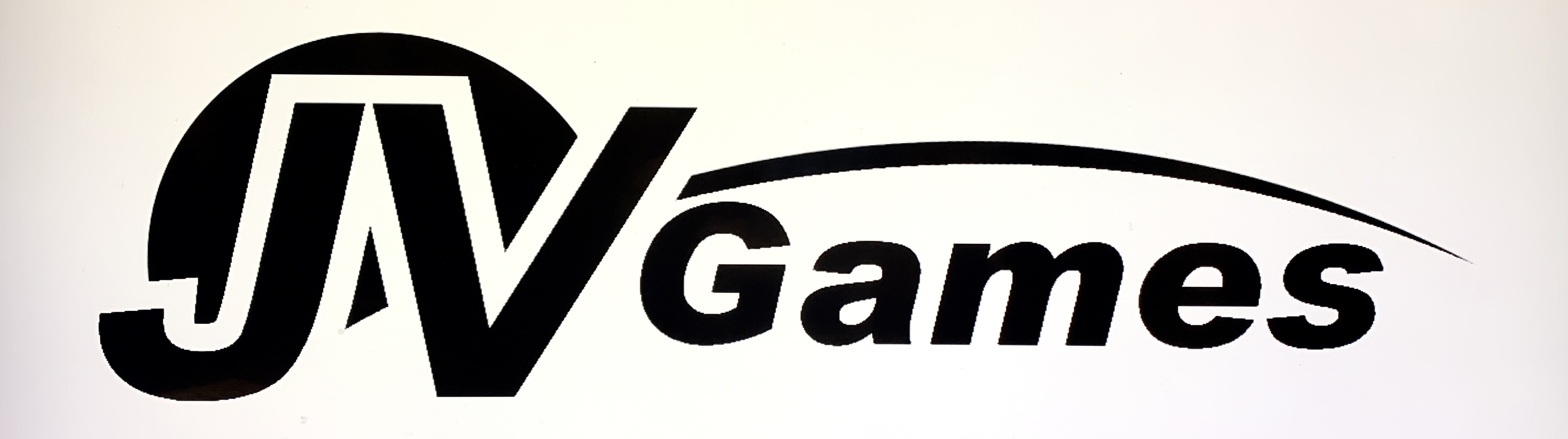
- Company type: Corporation
- Industry: Video games
- Founded: 1989; 36 years ago
- Founders: Jag Jaeger; Vince Valenti
- Headquarters: Las Vegas, Nevada, US
- Website: jvgames.com

JV Games is an American video game developer based in Las Vegas, Nevada. They have developed a number of titles including James Bond 007: Nightfire for Game Boy Advance, as well as Pong Toss! Frat Party Games and Incoming! for WiiWare.

== History ==
Both founders have been developing on computers since the early 1980s. Vince Valenti published his first type-in game Space Caverns in 1985 and Jag Jaeger submitted his title named Pac Fool around the same time for a competition.

JV Games, originally named JV Enterprises, was founded in 1989. Both Jag Jaeger and Vince Valenti joined to release a Computer Basics book in 1989.

Commercial success was found after JV Games released its first Console title with Towers II: Plight of the Stargazer on the Atari Jaguar published by Telegames.

After some early success JV Games decided to Incorporate in 1999. Soon After, JV Games teamed up with Electronic Arts to develop James Bond 007: Nightfire for the Game Boy Advance This game was the first fully 3D game engine used on the system, featured advanced lighting effects and a spot on sound track.

During the years 2014 to 2019 the founders at JV Games also leveraged their skills and developed several non-game systems including Minutehound: A time attendance system, Roomlia: Travel App and FlyStayGo: a wholesale membership system. Roomlia was sold to Remark Media in 2014

In more recent years JV Games, has released new titles including Friends & Secrets in 2019 and Towers II: Enhanced Stargazer Edition, a retro game, published by Songbird Productions for 2023.

== Games Developed ==
Year	Title	Platform(s)	Description
1991	Medieval Chess	Atari ST	Defeat the enemy king in battle using the traditional moves used in chess, augmented by hand-to-hand combat.
1994	Towers: Lord Baniff's Deceit	Atari ST, IBM PC DOS	Towers is an American style 3D role-playing game also multiplayer co-op via Serial/Midi cables to cross play on the PC/Atari ST.
1995	Towers II: Plight of the Stargazer	Atari Falcon	Towers II is the continuing RPG saga of a band of adventurers shipwrecked on the island of Lamini.
1996	Towers II: Plight of the Stargazer	Atari Jaguar	Towers II is the continuing RPG saga of a band of adventurers shipwrecked on the island of Lamini.
1996	Medieval Chess	IBM PC DOS	Defeat the enemy king in battle using the traditional moves used in chess, augmented by hand-to-hand combat.
1998	Towers II: Plight of the Stargazer	Microsoft Windows	Towers II is the continuing RPG saga of a band of adventurers shipwrecked on the island of Lamini.
1998	Back Track	Microsoft Windows	A comedic parody on FPS games, this 3D first-person shooter .
1999	Towers: Lord Baniff's Deceit	Game Boy Color	Towers is an American style 3D role-playing game also multiplayer co-op via Link-Cable on the GBC.
2001	WD-40 Spray Game	Microsoft Windows	The newly built Entity Engine was used to create a game for WD-40's 2000 uses campaign, and was available in CD form and at WD-40's Fan Site.
2001	Back Track	Game Boy Advance	A comedic parody on FPS games, this 3D first-person shooter was the first of its kind on the GBA and the only one to use intelligent Bots in multiplayer mode
2003	James Bond 007: Nightfire	Game Boy Advance	Based on the Entity Engine, the Entity Engine Advance drives the GBA to new 3D heights. Full collision checking, dynamic lighting, and true 3D geometry brings James Bond to life.
2007	Warhammer: Battle for Atluma	PlayStation Portable	Based on the collectible card game set in the Warhammer® world with multiplayer by connecting 2 PSPs Wirelessly.
2008	Pong Toss! Frat Party Games	WiiWare	Born on college campuses, Pong Toss is the ultimate party-game favorite.
2009	Incoming!	WiiWare	A progressive single player game, advancing levels as you pit yourself against and increasingly difficult AI; or multiplayer mayhem where you and an opponent duel it out and see whose tanks are defeated first.
2009	Christmas Clix	WiiWare	Co-developed with MunsieGames, you need to quickly remove the colored presents and ornaments that Santa stacks by clicking on the same colored presents.
2009	Pong Toss Pro	WiiWare	A sequel to Pong Toss! Frat Party Games, Pro completely redesigned the throwing system, and added tournament Mode where you can complete with up to 16 players in bracket play elimination.
2010	Games Around The World	Nintendo DS	Play on the go with 16 exciting minigames with unique visuals and special gameplay twists.
2010	Around the World in 50 Games	Nintendo Wii	Travel to exotic locations like Camelot Jazz, Back Country, B.C. Rock, Monster Mashers and Spaced Opera as you try your hand at 50 fun-filled games.
2010	Dart Rage	WiiWare	Dart Rage puts you in the spot light as you compete against friends, the computer, or both. Games include 301-901, Cricket, Poker, & American (Baseball) darts.
2013	Beer Pong	PlayStation Network for the PlayStation 3	Worked with a standard controller or the PlayStation Move to create a realistic throw experience. Playable online as well as bracket elimination play up to 16 teams.
2019	Friends & Secrets	iOS, Android	This casual game is sure to keep the jokes rolling as you use creative words to help your friends keep guessing. Game also collaborated with FlyStayGo for accessing hotel travel.
2023	Towers II: Enhanced Stargazer Edition	Atari Jaguar as Retrogaming	Reimagined and upgraded from the original offering released almost 30 years ago. Songbird Productions is publishing this game on original hardware as a limited edition run.
2023	Dart Frenzy	Android (Amico Home)	Single player/multiplayer dart game featuring motion controls and seven game modes: Round the Clock, High Score, Shanghai, Baseball, Cricket, Golf, and 301 to 901.
