= Pong Toss! Frat Party Games =

2008 party video game

- Developer: JV Games
- Publisher: JV Games
- Director: Jag Jaeger
- Platform: Wii
- Release: NA: July 28, 2008; EU: February 27, 2009
- Genre: Party
- Modes: Single-player, multiplayer

Pong Toss! Frat Party Games, known in Europe as Beer Pong! Frat Party Games, is a 2008 party video game developed by JV Games for the Wii's WiiWare digital distribution service. The premise is based on the party game beer pong, which requires players to toss ping pong balls into plastic cups filled with alcohol. The developers conducted a test to see how players play beer pong, and implemented motion controls in an attempt to make the game more fun. It was first released in North America in 2008, and then in Europe the following year.

Pong Toss has had a substantially negative reaction from critics by critics; it holds an aggregate score of 18/100 on Metacritic. One common complaint was its controls, which critics found cumbersome. It received negative reception from parents, activist groups, and Connecticut Attorney General Richard Blumenthal over its premise before its release due to its connection to alcohol as well as what they considered a lax Entertainment Software Rating Board (ESRB) content rating. In response, JV Games removed references to drinking alcohol from the game and its title, which caused the ESRB to lower the content rating. A sequel was released titled Pong Toss Pro: Frat Party Games, which received negative but improved reception.

== Gameplay ==
The player's character lining up a shot. Its gameplay and graphics received criticism.

Players use the Wii Remote's motion controls to throw an in-game ping pong ball across a table, with the intent of landing the ball in one of several cups on the other end; if successful, the cup is removed from the table. The game features two game modes: Pong Toss, which allows players to play in a traditional tournament style; and Speed Pong, which encourages players to use power-ups to negatively affect their opponents. The game can be played alone or with multiple people. This mode was created by JV Games especially for the game. Its sequel, Pong Toss Pro: Frat Party Games, modified the game's controls and added new modes, such as a tournament mode for four to sixteen players. It also adds a gauge to the game's heads-up display to help with planning and measuring shots.

== Development ==
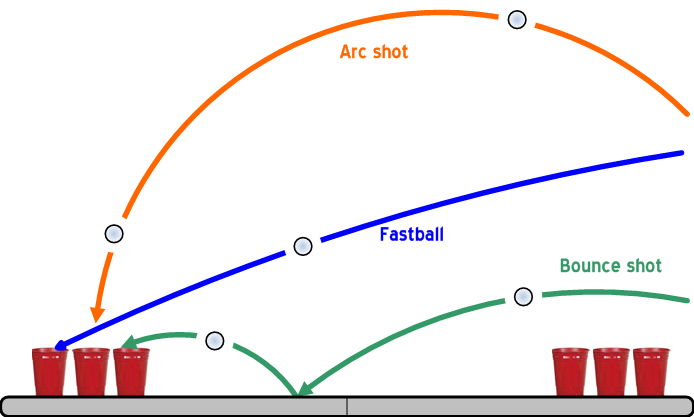
Diagram, which shows the mechanics of the game

Pong Toss! Frat Party Games was announced on May 21, 2008 as Frat Party Games: Beer Pong, and was intended to be based on the drinking game beer pong. It was developed by JV Games and directed by its vice president, Jag Jaeger. The game was released for Wii systems through the WiiWare download service on July 28, 2008, in North America and February 27, 2009, in Europe. The game was put on WiiWare due to the lessened development time, risk, cost, and the low size of the game. The developers followed a common set of rules from beer pong while designing the gameplay. While the designers considered mapping the controls to a traditional game controller, they felt that it would be less fun without motion control. They sought to deal with different throwing styles by finding a compromise to avoid making it too complex. They did this by doing a study of throwing habits of beer pong players.

JV Games announced a sequel for WiiWare called Pong Toss Pro: Frat Party Games. It was released in North America on June 28, 2010, for a lower price than its predecessor due to the state of the market.

=== Controversy ===
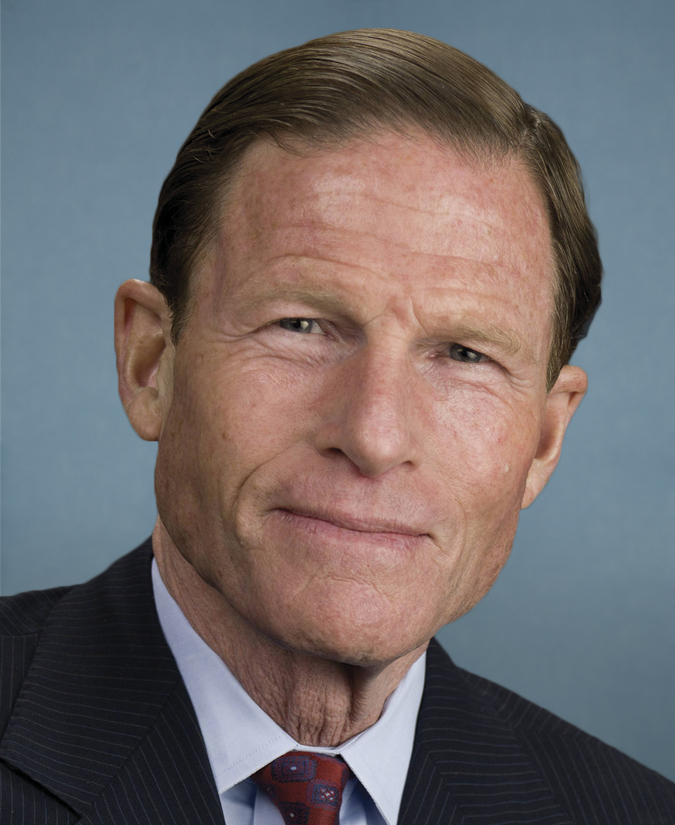
Attorney General of Connecticut Richard Blumenthal was a vocal critic of the game.

Pong Toss received controversy due to its reference to alcohol and purportedly lax ESRB rating. Community groups in Virginia complained about its Teen rating for ages 13 and up; they argued that a game based on the use of alcohol should not be sold to people under the legal drinking age. Parents sent letters to JV Games and Nintendo, the producer of the Wii console about the issue. Jaeger was dismissive of the controversy, and had no idea that the project would attract so much controversy. He used multiple examples of video games and other media that feature things considered inappropriate for children yet get a relative pass to argue a double standard.

The Attorney General of Connecticut Richard Blumenthal sent a letter to the ESRB which criticized it for its Teen rating of Pong Toss. ESRB spokesperson Eliot Mizrachi argued that it was not their role to control the content of the game, merely to assess content. Later, Patricia Vance, President of the ESRB, wrote a letter to Blumenthal, defending its rating by arguing that it did not depict consumption of alcohol. Blumenthal sent a second letter to the ESRB, which requested that other games containing alcoholic references should be given an Adult Only rating for people 18 and over. He further criticized the organization, arguing that the game is a direct reference to heavy alcohol consumption.

Despite disagreeing with Blumenthal, Jaeger informed him that the title would be changed to Pong Toss! Frat Party Games and that all references to alcohol would be removed. Blumenthal called this a victory, but still felt that it glorified alcohol consumption. Time's Meaghan Haire felt that JV Games should have anticipated the reaction, considering that both alcohol and video games often received criticism from parents. The final version was rated for 'everyone six and older'. A trailer for the sequel Pong Toss Pro was released which contained several news clips questioning comments made by Blumenthal about his service in Vietnam.

== Reception ==
Pong Toss! Frat Party Games received a substantially negative reception, holding an aggregate score of 18/100 from Metacritic. Andrew Hayward for 1Up.com staff found the controls to be poorly designed and the graphics felt very dated, while Matt Casamassina for IGN found it shallow. Matthew Castle for GamesMaster criticized it as pointless due to how simple the actual game is, also criticizing its controls and visuals. The change to remove references to beer caused staff of outlets such as 1Up.com, GamesRadar+, and GamePro to find it pointless. GamesRadar+ staff listed it as the 78th worst game of all time due to this and its controls while GamePro staff called it one of the worst video games of 2008.

Jaeger stated that he was not bothered by the negative reception from critics and gamers. He accused critics of never having played the game, also arguing that them being hardcore gamers made them prejudiced as it was meant for casual gamers.

The sequel Pong Toss Pro was received better than its predecessor by critics, though the overall reception was mixed. JV Games sought to address issues with the previous title regarding graphics and accuracy. Both Lucas M. Thomas for IGN and Matthew Blundon of Nintendo World Report felt that it was an improvement over the original, but IGN found it insufficient to justify purchasing.
