= List of 505 video games =

Logo of 505 Games

This is a list of video games published and/or developed by 505 Games.

== Developed ==
Title	Genre	Platform(s)	Release year	Notes
B-Units: Build it!	Building simulator	Nintendo DS, Wii	2011	
Bust-a-Move Online	Puzzle	Windows	2007	Game licensed and published by Taito
Championship Foosball	Table top game	Wii	2008	
Control Resonant	Action-adventure	PlayStation 5, Windows, Xbox Series X/S, PC	2026	Co-developed with Remedy Entertainment
Emergency Rescue	Casual game	Nintendo DS	2010	
Farmtopia	Farmer simulator	Nintendo DS	2010	
Furu Furu Park	Minigames	Wii	2008	Co-developed with Taito.
Learning to Spell	Brain training	Nintendo DS	2010	
Little Book of Big Secrets	Casual game	Nintendo DS	2010	
Maths Made Simple	Brain training	Nintendo DS	2008	
My Ballet Studio	Casual game	Nintendo DS, Wii	2009	
My Beauty Salon	Casual game	Nintendo DS	2009	
My Fashion Studio	Lifestyle simulator	Nintendo DS	2008	
My First Dollhouse	Casual game	Nintendo DS	2010	
Picture Perfect Hair Salon	Casual game	Nintendo DSi	2009	
Picture Perfect Pocket Stylist	Casual game	Nintendo DSi	2011	
Salon Superstar	Casual game	Nintendo DS	2009	
Spellbound	Brain training	Nintendo DS	2008	
Spellbound 2	Brain training	Nintendo DS	2010	
Spellbound Party	Brain training	Wii	2010	
Tangram Mania	Puzzle	Nintendo DS	2008	
World Championship Spelling	Brain training	Nintendo DS	2010	

== Published ==
=== As 505 GameStreet ===
Title	Genre	Developer(s)	Platform(s)	Release year
2 Games: Bust-A-Move 2 + Bust-A-Move 3 DX	Puzzle	Taito	PlayStation	2005
10,000 Bullets	Third-person shooter	Blue Moon Studio	PlayStation 2	2005
Aces of War	Flight simulator	Marionette	PlayStation 2	2007
Armored Core: Formula Front	Third-person shooter	From Software	PlayStation Portable	2006
Armored Core: Nine Breaker	Third-person shooter	From Software	PlayStation 2	2006
Assault Suits Valken	Shoot 'em up	NCS	PlayStation 2	2004
Beetle King	Adventure	Warashi	Nintendo DS	2007
The Bible Game	Christian	Crave Entertainment	PlayStation 2	2006
Billiard Action	Sports	Agenda	Nintendo DS	2006
Brick 'Em All	Puzzle	Access	Game Boy Advance	2006
Brick 'Em All DS	Puzzle	Warashi	Nintendo DS	2006
Bujingai	Hack and slash	Taito/Red Entertainment	PlayStation 2	2003
Bust-a-Move DS	Puzzle	Happy Happening	Nintendo DS	2006
Car Racing Challenge	Racing	Tamsoft	PlayStation 2	2006
Deep Water	Hunting	Tamsoft	PlayStation 2	2005
Demolition Girl	Action	Tamsoft	PlayStation 2	2005
Devilish	Action	Starfish	Nintendo DS	2005
DodgeBall	Sports	Access	PlayStation 2	2005
Dragon Blaze	Scrolling shooter	Psikyo	PlayStation 2	2004
Eagle Eye Golf	Sports	Telenet Japan	PlayStation 2	2006
Energy Airforce	Flight simulator	Taito	PlayStation 2	2005
Energy Airforce Aim Strike!	Flight simulator	Taito	PlayStation 2	2004
Fighting Angels	Fighting	Tamsoft	PlayStation 2	2005
Fire Heroes	Action-adventure	Spike	PlayStation 2	2005
Fishing Fantasy: BuzzRod	Fishing	Starfish SD	PlayStation 2	2005
Fitness Fun	Exergaming	Tamsoft	PlayStation 2	2006
Forty 4 Party	Party game	HuneX	PlayStation 2	2005
Funny Cards	Card game	Access	Game Boy Advance	2006
Giga Wing Generations	Scrolling shooter	Takumi Corporation	PlayStation 2	2006
Graffiti Kingdom	Action RPG	Taito/Garakuta Studio	PlayStation 2	2004
Guilty Gear Isuka	Fighting	Arc System Works	PlayStation 2, Xbox	2003
Guru Guru	Action	BeeWorks	Nintendo DS	2007
Harvest Fishing	Fishing	Marvelous Interactive	PlayStation 2	2005
Harvest Moon: A Wonderful Life	Farmer simulator	Victor Interactive Software	GameCube, PlayStation 2	2003
The Holy Bible	Christian	Crave Entertainment	Game Boy Advance	2006
Homura	Hack and slash	Taito/SKonec Entertainment	PlayStation 2	2005
Iron Sea	Naval combat	Tamsoft	PlayStation 2	2006
Katana Action	Hack and slash	ALU	PlayStation 2	2006
Koloomn	Puzzle	Conspiracy Entertainment	PlayStation Portable	2006
Labyrinth	Puzzle	Lancarse	Nintendo DS	2006
Lupin the 3rd: Treasure of the Sorcerer King	Action	Banpresto	PlayStation 2	2005
Magna Carta	RPG	Softmax	PlayStation 2, PlayStation Portable	2004
Master Chess	Chess	Yuki Enterprise	PlayStation 2	2004
Michigan: Report from Hell	Survival horror	Grasshopper Manufacture	PlayStation 2	2004
Monster Puzzle	Puzzle	Success	Nintendo DS	2006
Motorbike King	Racing	Tamsoft	PlayStation 2	2004
Panzer Front Ausf.B	Tank simulator	Enterbrain	PlayStation 2	2005
Paparazzi	Photo simulator	HuneX	PlayStation 2	2005
Party Girls	Party game	Tamsoft/HuneX	PlayStation 2	2005
Pinball Fun	Pinball	HuneX	PlayStation 2	2004
Pink Pong	Sports	Tamsoft/HuneX	PlayStation 2	2004
Playwize Poker & Casino	Casino game	Bits Studios	PlayStation 2, PlayStation Portable	2006
Puzzle Maniacs	Puzzle	HuneX	PlayStation 2	2006
Radio Helicopter	Toy simulator	Tomcat System	PlayStation 2	2004
Radio Helicopter II	Toy simulator	Aqua Systems	PlayStation 2	2006
Raiden III	Scrolling shooter	MOSS	PlayStation 2	2006
Rule of Rose	Survival horror	Punchline	PlayStation 2	2006
Samurai Aces	Scrolling shooter	Psikyo	PlayStation 2	2004
Samurai Western	Action-adventure	Acquire	PlayStation 2	2005
Shogun's Blade	Hack and slash	Tamsoft	PlayStation 2	2005
Soccer Life!	Sports	Cavia	PlayStation 2	2004
Soccer Life 2	Sports	Cavia	PlayStation 2	2005
Sol Divide	Scrolling shooter	Psikyo	PlayStation 2	2004
Space War Attack	Flight simulator	IMJ Entertainment/Bit Town	PlayStation 2	2006
Splatter Master	Action-adventure	Vingt-et-un Systems	PlayStation 2	2005
Steambot Chronicles	Action-adventure	Irem	PlayStation 2	2006
Stella Deus: The Gate of Eternity	Tactical RPG	Pinegrow	PlayStation 2	2004
Street Boyz	Fighting	Tamsoft	PlayStation 2	2005
Street Golfer	Sports	Polygon Magic	PlayStation 2	2006
Tengai	Scrolling shooter	Psikyo	PlayStation 2	2004
Taxi Rider	Racing	Tamsoft	PlayStation 2	2006
Top Gun	Combat flight	Interactive Vision	Nintendo DS	2006
Twenty 2 Party	Party game	Japan Art Media	PlayStation 2	2005
Ultimate Casino	Casino game	Amedio	PlayStation 2	2004
Ultra Bust-a-Move	Puzzle	Taito	Xbox	2006
Volleyball Challenge	Sports	D3 Publisher	PlayStation 2	2004
Wild Arms 4	RPG	Media.Vision	PlayStation 2	2006
World Fighting	Fighting	HuneX	PlayStation 2	2004
XII Stag	Shoot 'em up	Triangle Service/Dreams	PlayStation 2	2004
Yakuza Fury	Action	Vingt-et-un Systems	PlayStation 2	2005
Zombie Attack	Survival horror	Tamsoft	PlayStation 2	2006
Zombie Zone	Survival horror	Tamsoft	PlayStation 2	2005
Zoo Puzzle	Puzzle	Success	PlayStation 2	2004

=== As 505 Games ===
Title	Genre	Developer(s)	Platform(s)	Release year
4x4 Hummer	Racing	Avalon Entertainment	Microsoft Windows	2008
A-Train HX	Train simulator	Artdink	Xbox 360	2006
Abzû	Adventure	Giant Squid	Microsoft Windows, PlayStation 4, Xbox One, Nintendo Switch, Amazon Luna	2016
Aces of War	Flight simulator	Marionette	PlayStation Portable	2007
Adidas miCoach	Sports	Lightning Fish	PlayStation 3, Xbox 360	2012
Adrift	First-person experience	Three One Zero	Microsoft Windows, Oculus Rift, PlayStation 4	2015
Adventure Pop	Puzzle	Tic Toc Games	Microsoft Windows, PlayStation 4, Xbox One	2017
All Round Hunter	Hunting	Beast Studios	Wii, Xbox 360	2010
Among the Trolls	Action, survival	Forbidden Studios	Microsoft Windows	2023
The Apprentice Los Angeles	Casual game	Legacy Interactive	Microsoft Windows	2007
Ar tonelico: Melody of Elemia	RPG	Gust Co. Ltd.	PlayStation 2	2007
ARMA: Armed Assault	Tactical shooter	Bohemia Interactive	Microsoft Windows	2007
ARMA: Queen's Gambit	Tactical shooter	Bohemia/Black Element	Microsoft Windows	2007
ARMA 2	Tactical shooter	Bohemia Interactive	Microsoft Windows	2009
ARMA 2: Operation Arrowhead	Tactical shooter	Bohemia Interactive	Microsoft Windows	2010
Armored Core 4	Mecha combat	From Software	PlayStation 3, Xbox 360	2007
Armored Core: Last Raven	Third-person shooter	From Software	PlayStation 2, PlayStation Portable	2006
Assetto Corsa	Racing simulation	Kunos Simulazioni	Microsoft Windows, PlayStation 4, Xbox One	2016
Assetto Corsa Competizione	Racing simulation	Kunos Simulazioni	Microsoft Windows, PlayStation 4, Xbox One	2020
Assetto Corsa EVO	Racing simulation	Kunos Simulazioni	Microsoft Windows	2025
Assetto Corsa Rally	Racing simulation	Supernova Games Studios and Kunos Simulazioni	Microsoft Windows	2025 (Early access)
Babysitting Mama	Babysitter simulator	Cooking Mama Limited	Wii	2010
Backbreaker	Sports	NaturalMotion	Android, iOS, PlayStation 3, Xbox 360	2010
Pop!	Puzzle	Dreams Interactive	Wii	2008
Battle Ages	Strategy	DR Studios	PlayStation 4, Xbox One	2016
Battle Islands	Strategy	DR Studios	PlayStation 4, Xbox One	2015
Battle Islands: Commanders	Strategy	DR Studios	PlayStation 4, Xbox One	2017
Battle Fantasia	Fighting	Arc System Works	PlayStation 3, Xbox 360	2008
Big Catch: Bass Fishing	Fishing	SIMS Co., Ltd.	Nintendo DS, Wii	2007
Big Catch: Bass Fishing 2	Fishing	SIMS Co., Ltd.	Wii	2010
Big Word Puzzle Book	Brain training	1Bit Garden	Nintendo DS	2009
Blackwater	First-person shooter	Zombie Studios	Xbox 360	2011
Blades of Fire	Action-adventure	MercurySteam	Microsoft Windows, PlayStation 5, Xbox Series X/S	2025
Blend-it	Puzzle	Crush Digital	Nintendo DS	2010
Bloodstained: Ritual of the Night	Metroidvania	ArtPlay/Inti Creates	Microsoft Windows, OS X, Linux, PlayStation 4, Nintendo Switch, Xbox One	2019
Bloodstained: The Scarlet Engagement	Metroidvania	ArtPlay	Microsoft Windows, PlayStation 5, Xbox Series X/S	2026
Brain Buster Puzzle Pak	Puzzle	Agetec/Nikoli	Nintendo DS	2007
Brothers: A Tale of Two Sons	Adventure	Starbreeze Studios	Microsoft Windows, PlayStation Network, Steam, Xbox Live Arcade, PlayStation 4, Xbox One	2013
Brothers: A Tale of Two Sons Remake	Adventure	Avantgarden	Microsoft Windows, PlayStation 5, Xbox Series X/S	2024
Brunswick Pro Bowling	Bowling	Point of View	iOS, Nintendo 3DS, Wii, PlayStation 2, PlayStation 3, PlayStation Portable, Xbox 360	2007
Buffy the Vampire Slayer: Sacrifice	Beat 'em up	Beast Studios	Nintendo DS	2009
Bust-a-Move Ghost	Puzzle	Taito	PlayStation Portable	2006
Bust-a-Move	Puzzle	Taito/Happy Happening	Wii	2007
Camping Mama: Outdoor Adventures	Camping simulator	Racjin	Nintendo DS	2011
Cats & Dogs: The Revenge of Kitty Galore	Action	Engine Software	Nintendo DS	2010
Chameleon: To Dye For!	Puzzle	Starfish SD	Nintendo DS	2006
Chimpact	Platformer	Yippee! Entertainment	Nintendo DS	2013
Circus	Party game	Artematica	Wii	2010
Cookie & Cream	Action-adventure	From Software	Nintendo DS	2007
Cooking Mama	Cookery simulator	Office Create	Nintendo DS	2006
Cooking Mama: Cook Off	Cookery simulator	Cooking Mama Limited	Wii	2007
Cooking Mama: World Kitchen	Cookery simulator	Cooking Mama Limited	Wii	2008
Cooking Mama 2: Dinner with Friends	Cookery simulator	Cooking Mama Limited	Nintendo DS	2007
Cooking Mama 3: Shop & Chop	Cookery simulator	Cooking Mama Limited	Nintendo DS	2009
Cooking Mama 4: Kitchen Magic	Cookery simulator	Cooking Mama Limited	Nintendo DS	2011
Control	Action-adventure	Remedy Entertainment	Microsoft Windows, PlayStation 4, Xbox One, Nintendo Switch, PlayStation 5, Xbox Series X/S, Google Stadia, Amazon Luna	2019
Cooking Mama World: Combo Pack Volume 1	Cookery simulator	Cooking Mama Limited	Nintendo DS	2012
Cooking Mama World: Combo Pack Volume 2	Cookery simulator	Cooking Mama Limited	Nintendo DS	2012
Counter Force	Shoot 'em up	HyperDevbox Japan	Wii	2008
Crafting Mama	Crafter simulator	Cooking Mama Limited	Nintendo DS	2010
Crime Boss: Rockay City	First-person shooter	Ingame Studios	Microsoft Windows, PlayStation 5, Xbox Series X/S	2023
Dance Sensation!	Dance simulator	Alpine Studios	Wii	2010
Dave Mirra BMX Challenge	Sports	Left Field Productions	Wii	2007
Dawn of Fantasy	MMORTS	Reverie World Studios	Microsoft Windows	2011
Days of Thunder: NASCAR Edition	Racing	Piranha Games	PlayStation 3	2011
Death Stranding	Action	Kojima Productions	Microsoft Windows, iPadOS, iOS, macOS, Xbox Series X/S, Amazon Luna	2020
Deep Black	Third-person shooter	Biart	Microsoft Windows, PlayStation 3, Xbox 360	2012
Deep Labyrinth	RPG	Interactive Brains	Nintendo DS	2007
Defense Grid 2	Tower defense	Hidden Path Entertainment	Microsoft Windows, OS X, Linux, PlayStation 4, Xbox One	2014
The Destiny of Zorro	Action-adventure	Pronto Games	Wii	2009
Discovery Kids: Dolphin Discovery	Pet-raising simulator	Starfish	Nintendo DS	2009
Discovery Kids: Kitten Corner	Pet-raising simulator	Beast Studios	Nintendo DS	2009
Discovery Kids: Parrot Pals	Pet-raising simulator	Starfish/Noise Factory	Nintendo DS	2009
Discovery Kids: Pony Paradise	Pet-raising simulator		Nintendo DS	2009
Discovery Kids: Puppy Playtime	Pet-raising simulator	Beast Studios	Nintendo DS	2009
Discovery Kids: Snake Safari	Adventure	Gimajin	Nintendo DS	2010
Discovery Kids: Spider Quest	Adventure	Gimajin	Nintendo DS	2009
Diva Girls: Diva Ballerina	Dance simulator	Arc System Works	Nintendo DS, Wii	2009
Diva Girls: Diva Dancers	Dance simulator	Arc System Works	Nintendo DS	2009
Diva Girls: Divas on Ice	Dance simulator	Arc System Works	Nintendo DS, Wii	2009
Diva Girls: Making the Music	Music game	Arc System Works	Nintendo DS	2009
Diva Girls: Princess on Ice 2	Dance simulator	Arc System Works	Nintendo DS	2009
Don't Starve	Survival	Klei Entertainment	Android, iOS, Linux, Microsoft Windows, OS X, PlayStation 3, PlayStation 4, PlayStation Vita, Wii U, Xbox One, Nintendo Switch	2013
Draglade	Fighting	Dimps	Nintendo DS	2008
Drawn to Life: Two Realms	Platformer	Digital Continue	Android, iOS, Microsoft Windows, Nintendo Switch	2020
Eiyuden Chronicle: Hundred Heroes	Role-playing	Rabbit & Bear Studios	Microsoft Windows, Nintendo Switch, PlayStation 4, Xbox One, PlayStation 5, Xbox Series X/S	2024
Eiyuden Chronicle: Rising	Role-playing	Natsume Atari	Microsoft Windows, Nintendo Switch, PlayStation 4, Xbox One, PlayStation 5, Xbox Series X/S	2022
Exit 2	Platformer	Taito	PlayStation Portable	2007
Face Racers: Photo Finish	Racing	Renegade Kid	Nintendo 3DS	2012
Fashion Designer: Style Icon	Lifestyle simulator	Creative Patterns	Nintendo DS	2007
Fever Frenzy	Action	Rainbow Creatures	Microsoft Windows	2008
Fire Pro Wrestling Returns	Fighting	Spike	PlayStation 2	2008
Funky Barn	Farmer simulator	Tantalus	Wii U	2012
Galactik Football	Sports	Beast Studios	Nintendo DS	2009
Gardening Mama	Gardener simulator	Cooking Mama Limited	Nintendo DS	2009
Gems of War	Puzzle	Infinite Interactive	Android, PlayStation 4, Xbox One, Nintendo Switch	2015
Ghostrunner	Action	One More Level, Slipgate Ironworks	Microsoft Windows, PlayStation 4, Xbox One, Nintendo Switch, PlayStation 5, Xbox Series X/S	2020
Ghostrunner 2	Action	One More Level	Microsoft Windows, PlayStation 5, Xbox Series X/S	2023
Grease	Party game	Zoë Mode	Nintendo DS, Wii	2010
Grease Dance	Dance simulator	Zoë Mode	PlayStation 3, Xbox 360	2011
Greg Hastings Paintball 2	First-person shooter	Super X Studios	Wii, PlayStation 3, Xbox 360	2010
Grow: Song of the Evertree	Action-adventure	Prideful Sloth	Microsoft Windows, Nintendo Switch, PlayStation 4, Xbox One	2021
Guilty Gear 2: Overture	Real-time strategy	Arc System Works	Xbox 360	2009
Guilty Gear XX: Accent Core	Fighting	Aksys Games	Wii	2008
Gun Club	First-person shooter	Jarhead Games	PlayStation 2	2006
Gunfire Reborn	Roguelite, first-person shooter	Duoyi Games	Microsoft Windows, Nintendo Switch, PlayStation 4, Xbox One, PlayStation 5, Xbox Series X/S	2022
Gurumin: A Monstrous Adventure	Action-adventure	Nihon Falcom	PlayStation Portable	2007
Hawken	First-person shooter	Reloaded Games	Microsoft Windows, PlayStation 4, Xbox One	2016
Hi Hamtaro! Little Hamsters Big Adventure	Puzzle	AlphaDream	Nintendo DS	2008
The Hidden	Adventure	1st Playable Productions	Nintendo 3DS	2012
Hop: The Movie Game	Action-adventure	Engine Software	Nintendo DS	2011
Horace	Platformer	Paul Helman, Sean Scapelhorn	Microsoft Windows, Nintendo Switch, PlayStation 4, Xbox One	2019
Hoshigami Remix	Strategy RPG	Arc System Works	Nintendo DS	2007
Hotel for Dogs	Adventure	FarSight Studios	Nintendo DS, Wii, Microsoft Windows	2009
How to Survive	Action RPG	Eko Software	Microsoft Windows, PlayStation Network, Xbox Live Arcade, Wii U	2013
How to Survive: Storm Warning Edition	Action RPG	Eko Software	PlayStation 4, Xbox One	2014
How to Survive 2	Action RPG	Eko Software	Microsoft Windows, PlayStation 4, Xbox One	2017
Hulk Hogan's Main Event	Fighting	Panic Button	Xbox 360	2011
I Did It Mum! (Boy)	Casual game	Starfish SD	Nintendo DS	2007
I Did It Mum! (Girl)	Casual game	Starfish SD	Nintendo DS	2007
I Did It Mum! 2 (Boy)	Casual game	Starfish SD	Nintendo DS	2008
I Did It Mum! 2 (Girl)	Casual game	Starfish SD	Nintendo DS	2008
I Did It Mum! Dolls House	Casual game	Starfish SD	Nintendo DS	2009
I Did It Mum! Picture Book	Casual game	Starfish SD	Nintendo DS	2008
I Did It Mum! Spelling	Casual game	Starfish SD	Nintendo DS	2009
IL-2 Sturmovik: Birds of Prey	Combat flight	Gaijin Entertainment	Nintendo DS, Microsoft Windows, PlayStation 3, PlayStation Portable, Xbox 360	2009
Indivisible	Role-playing game	Lab Zero Games	PlayStation 4, Xbox One, Nintendo Switch, Linux, OS X, Microsoft Windows	2019
Izuna: The Legend of the Ninja	Action RPG	Success/Ninja Studio	Nintendo DS	2007
Jillian Michaels' Fitness Adventure	Exergaming	n-Space	Xbox 360	2011
Joe Dever's Lone Wolf Console Edition	Role-playing game	Forge Reply SRL	PlayStation 4, Xbox One	2016
Johnny Test	Platformer	Sarbakan	Nintendo DS	2011
Journey to the Savage Planet	Action, Exploration	Typhoon Studios	Microsoft Windows	2020
Kira Kira Pop Princess	Casual game	HuneX	Nintendo DS	2008
Laser League	Action	Roll7	Microsoft Windows, PlayStation 4, Xbox One	2018
Last Day of June	Adventure, puzzle	Ovosonico	Microsoft Windows, PlayStation 4, Nintendo Switch	2017
Left or Right: Ambidextrous Challenge	Brain training	Japan Art Media	Nintendo DS	2007
Legend of Sayuki	Scrolling shooter	Starfish	Wii, PlayStation 2	2008
Le Avventure di "Lupin III": Lupin la Morte, Zenigata l'Amore	Action	Banpresto	PlayStation 2	2008
Magic Sudoku	Sudoku	Blackjack	PlayStation Portable	2008
Marlow Briggs and the Mask of Death	Hack and slash	ZootFly	Microsoft Windows, Xbox Live Arcade	2013
Mean Girls	Puzzle	Crush Digital	Nintendo DS	Cancelled
Men of War	Real-time strategy	Best Way/Digitalmindsoft	Microsoft Windows	2009
Miasma Chronicles	Turn-based tactics, Tactical role-playing game	The Bearded Ladies	Microsoft Windows, PlayStation 5, Xbox Series X/S	2023
Michael Phelps: Push the Limit	Sports	Blitz Games	Xbox 360	2011
MinDStorm	Brain training	ASK	Nintendo DS	2007
MinDStorm 2	Brain training	ASK	Nintendo DS	2009
Monster Bomber	Puzzle	Taito	Nintendo DS	2007
MorphX	Action-adventure	Buka/Targem Games	Xbox 360	2010
My Dangerous Pet Snake	Pet-raising simulator	Magic Pockets	Nintendo DS	2009
My Dangerous Pet Spider	Pet-raising simulator		Nintendo DS	2009
My Little Helper: Spring Cleaner	Casual game	Sonic Powered	Nintendo DS	Cancelled
My Pet Dolphin	Pet-raising simulator	Opera House	Nintendo DS	2007
My Pet Dolphin	Pet-raising simulator	Opera House	Nintendo DS	2007
My Pet Dolphin 2	Pet-raising simulator	Starfish SD	Nintendo DS	2008
My Pet Chimp	Pet-raising simulator	Starfish/Noise Factory	Nintendo DS	2010
My Pet Parrot	Pet-raising simulator	Magic Pockets	Nintendo DS	2009
My Pet Puppy 3D	Pet-raising simulator	Starfish SD	Nintendo 3DS	2012
Mystery Detective	Adventure	BeeWorks	Nintendo DS	2007
Mystery Detective II	Adventure	BeeWorks	Nintendo DS	2007
Mystery Mansion	Action	Dreams Interactive	Nintendo DS	2008
Naruto Shippuden: Dragon Blade Chronicles	Action	Takara Tomy	Wii	2010
Naruto Shippūden 3D: The New Era	Action	Takara Tomy	Nintendo 3DS	2011
Naughty Bear	Action-adventure	Artificial Mind and Movement	PlayStation 3, Xbox 360, iOS	2010
Naughty Bear: Panic in Paradise	Action-adventure	Behaviour Interactive	PlayStation Network, Xbox Live Arcade	2012
Naval Assault: The Killing Tide	Real-time strategy	Artech Studios	Xbox 360	2010
NecroVisioN	First-person shooter	The Farm 51	Microsoft Windows	2009
New Touch Party Game	Party game	ASK	Nintendo DS	2007
No Man's Sky	Action, adventure, survival	Hello Games	Xbox One	2018
Nutrition Matters	Casual game	MileStone Inc./Devils Details	Nintendo DS, Wii	2009
Objects in Space	Space simulator	Flat Earth Games	Microsoft Windows, OS X, Linux	2018
Overkill's The Walking Dead	First-person shooter	Overkill Software	Microsoft Windows, PlayStation 4, Xbox One	2018
Payday 2	First-person shooter	Overkill Software	Microsoft Windows, Linux, PlayStation 3, PlayStation Network, Xbox 360, Xbox Live Arcade	2013
Payday 2 Crimewave Edition	First-person shooter	Overkill Software	PlayStation 4, Xbox One	2015
Pet Zombies	Pet-raising simulator	1st Playable Productions	Nintendo 3DS	2012
Phineas and Ferb: Quest for Cool Stuff	Platformer	Behaviour Interactive	Nintendo 3DS, Nintendo DS, Wii, Wii U	2014
Pic Pic	Puzzle	Success	Nintendo DS	2008
Pixel Piracy	Action-adventure	Abstraction Games	PlayStation 4, Xbox One	2016
Pop Town	Action	HuneX	Nintendo DS	2009
Portal Knights	Action role-playing, survival	Keen Games	Microsoft Windows, PlayStation 4, Xbox One, Nintendo Switch	2017
Princess on Ice	Dance simulator	Arc System Works	Nintendo DS	2008
The Professor's Brain Trainer: Logic	Brain training	Interchannel	Nintendo DS	2007
The Professor's Brain Trainer: Memory	Brain training	Interchannel	Nintendo DS	2007
Total Tank Simulator	Battle Simulator	Noobz from Poland	Microsoft Windows	2020
Prominence Poker	Card & Board	Pipeworks Studios	Microsoft Windows, PlayStation 4, Xbox One	2016
Radio Helicopter	Toy simulator	Sonic Powered	Wii	2008
Raw Danger!	Action-adventure	Irem	PlayStation 2	2007
Redout	Racing	34BigThings	Microsoft Windows, Nintendo Switch, PlayStation 4, Xbox One	2016
Re:Legend	Role-playing	Magnus Games	Microsoft Windows, Nintendo Switch, PlayStation 4, Xbox One	2021
Red Solstice 2: Survivors	Real-time strategy game	Ironward	Microsoft Windows, PlayStation 4, PlayStation 5, Xbox One, Xbox Series X/S	2021
Rekoil	First-person shooter	Plastic Piranha	Microsoft Windows, Xbox Live Arcade	2014
River City Ransom	Beat 'em up	Technōs Japan	Virtual Console	2007
Riviera: The Promised Land	RPG	Sting Entertainment	PlayStation Portable	2008
Rolling Stone: Drum King	Music game	Arc System Works	Wii	2009
Rocket League	Sports	Psyonix	Microsoft Windows, PlayStation 4, Xbox One	2016
Rugby World Cup 2011	Sports	HB Studios	PlayStation 3, Xbox 360	2011
Rule of Rose	Survival horror	Punchline	PlayStation 2	2006
Shin Chan: Aventuras de Cine!	Action	Inti Creates	Nintendo DS	2008
Shin Chan: Flipa en colores!	Action	Inti Creates	Nintendo DS	2007
Shin Chan: Las nuevas aventuras para Wii!	Action	Matrix Software	Wii	2008
Shin Chan Contra Los Plastas!	Action	Inti Creates	Nintendo DS	2009
Sniper Elite III	Tactical shooter	Rebellion Developments	PlayStation 3, PlayStation 4, Xbox 360, Xbox One	2014
Sniper Elite V2	Tactical shooter	Rebellion Developments	Microsoft Windows, PlayStation 3, PlayStation Network, Wii U, Xbox 360, Xbox Live Arcade	2012
Steambot Chronicles	Action-adventure	Irem	PlayStation 2	2006
Stray Blade	Action role-playing game	Point Blank Games	Microsoft Windows, PlayStation 5, Xbox Series X/S	2023
Subbuteo	Table top game	Artematica	Nintendo DS	2008
Super Robot Taisen: Original Generation	Strategy RPG	Banpresto	Game Boy Advance	2007
Supremacy MMA	Fighting	Kung Fu Factory	PlayStation 3, PlayStation Vita, Xbox 360	2011
Supreme Commander	Real-time strategy	Gas Powered Games/Aspyr	Xbox Live Arcade	2008
Table Football	Table top game	Opus Studio	Wii	2008
Takedown: Red Sabre	Tactical shooter	Serellan	Microsoft Windows, Xbox Live Arcade	2013
Terraria	Action-adventure	Re-Logic	Android, iOS, Microsoft Windows, PlayStation Network, PlayStation Vita, Xbox Live Arcade, PlayStation 4, Xbox One, Nintendo Switch	2011
Tiny Brains	Puzzle	Spearhead Games	Microsoft Windows, PlayStation 3, PlayStation 4, PlayStation Network	2013
The Tomorrow War	Combat flight	CrioLand	Microsoft Windows	2008
Top Gun: Hard Lock	Combat flight	Headstrong Games	Microsoft Windows, PlayStation 3, Xbox 360	2012
Turn It Around	Minigames	Taito	Nintendo DS	2007
Twister Mania	Dance simulator	Naked Sky Entertainment	Xbox 360	2011
Underworld Ascendant	Dungeon crawler	OtherSide Entertainment	Microsoft Windows, OS X, Linux	2018
Unturned	Survival	Smartly Dressed Games	Xbox One, PlayStation 4, Nintendo Switch	2020
VeggieTales: LarryBoy and the Bad Apple	Platformer	Crave Entertainment	PlayStation 2	2006
Virginia	Exploration	Variable State	PlayStation 4, Xbox One, Microsoft Windows, OS X	2016
We Cheer	Dance simulator	Machatin/Land Ho!	Wii	2008
We Rock: Drum King	Music game	DEL	Wii	2009
Wild Arms 5	Action-adventure	Media.Vision	PlayStation 2	2008
Wild Arms XF	Action-adventure	Media.Vision	PlayStation Portable	2008
World Championship Cards	Card game	Crave Entertainment	PlayStation 2, PlayStation Portable	2008
World Championship Poker: All In	Poker game	Point of View	Wii, PlayStation 2, PlayStation Portable, Xbox 360	2007
World Championship Poker: Deluxe Series	Poker game	Sensory Sweep	Game Boy Advance, Nintendo DS, GameCube, PlayStation 2, Xbox	2006
World Game Tour	Party game	DreamCatcher Interactive	Wii	2010
Wrecked: Revenge Revisited	Racing	Supersonic Software	PlayStation 3, Xbox 360	2012
Wuchang: Fallen Feathers	Action RPG	Leenzee	Microsoft Windows, PlayStation 5, Xbox Series X/S	2025
Yggdra Union: We'll Never Fight Alone	Tactical RPG	Sting Entertainment	Game Boy Advance	2007
Zorro: Quest for Justice	Action-adventure	Beast Studios	Nintendo DS	2010
Zumba Fitness	Exergaming	Pipeworks Studios	Wii, PlayStation 3, Xbox 360	2010
Zumba Fitness Core	Exergaming	Zoë Mode	Wii U, Xbox 360	2012
Zumba Kids	Exergaming	Zoë Mode	Wii U, Xbox 360	2013
Zumba Fitness: World Party	Exergaming	Zoë Mode	Wii, Wii U, Xbox 360, Xbox One	2013
