= List of role-playing video games: 2012 to 2013 =

This is a comprehensive index of commercial role-playing video games (RPGs), sorted chronologically by year. Information regarding release platform, release type, RPG subgenre, game setting, developers, publishers, and country of origin is provided where available. The table can be sorted by clicking on the small boxes next to the column headings.

This list includes all RPG subgenres, including MMORPGs, Action RPGs and Tactical RPGs. This list does not include MUDs and Roguelikes by default, unless they have an additional RPG subgenre. For standalone lists on these subgenres, see List of MUDs and List of roguelikes

== Legend ==
Video game platforms
3DS	Nintendo 3DS, 3DS Virtual Console, iQue 3DS	DROID	Android	DS	Nintendo DS, DSiWare, iQue DS
iOS	iOS, iPhone, iPod, iPadOS, iPad, visionOS, Apple Vision Pro	LIN	Linux, SteamOS	MOBI	Mobile phone
OSX	macOS	PS3	PlayStation 3	PS4	PlayStation 4
PSP	PlayStation Portable	PSV	PlayStation Vita	OSX	macOS
Wii	Wii, WiiWare, Wii Virtual Console	WiiU	Wii U, WiiU Virtual Console	WIN	Windows, all versions Windows 95 and up
X360	(replace with XB360)	XBLA	Term not found	XOne	(replace with XBO)

Types of releases
Compilation	A compilation, anthology or collection of several titles, usually (but not always) belonging to the same series
Early access	A game launched in early access is unfinished and thus might contain bugs and glitches or have some of the content missing
Episodic	An episodic video game that is released in batches over a period of time
Expansion	A large-scale DLC to an already existing game that adds new story, areas and additions and/or changes to the game's mechanics
Full release	A full release of a game that launched in early access first
Limited	A special release (often called "Limited" or "Collector's Edition") with bonus collector's material. Often provided to people who pre-order a game
Port	The game first appeared on a different platform and a port was made. The game is like the original, with few or no differences
Remake	The game is an enhanced remake of an original, made using a new engine and/or assets and thus containing completely new sound, graphics and possibly changes to the story and/or gameplay
Remaster	The game is a remaster of an original, released on the same or different platform, with (usually minor) changes to graphics, sound and/or gameplay
Rerelease	The game was re-released on the same platform with no or only minor changes

Video game genres
Action RPG	Action role-playing game	Dungeon crawl	Dungeon crawl	JRPG	Japanese-style role-playing game
MMORPG	Massively multiplayer online RPG	Monster tamer	Monster-taming game	MUD	Multi-user dungeon
Real-time	Real-time game	Roguelike	Roguelike, Roguelite	Sandbox	Sandbox game
Soulslike	Soulslike	Tactical RPG	Tactical role-playing game	Turn-based	Turn-based game

== List ==
Year	Title	Developer	Publisher	Theme	Platform	Genre	Series/Notes	COO
2012	10000000 (EN)	EightyEightGames			WIN, iOS	Puzzle video game		
2012	2nd Super Robot Wars Original Generation (EN) 第2次スーパーロボット大戦OG (JA)	Banpresto	Bandai Namco Entertainment		PS3	Tactical RPG	Super Robot Wars	
2012	Atelier Ayesha: The Alchemist of Dusk (EN) アーシャのアトリエ 〜黄昏の大地の錬金術士〜 (JA)	Gust Co. Ltd.	Koei Tecmo Holdings		PS3, PSV		Atelier	
2012	Baldur's Gate: Enhanced Edition (EN)	Beamdog	Atari, SA	Fantasy	DROID, WIN, MAC, iOS		Enhanced remake of Baldur's Gate.	CA
2012	Battleloot Adventure (EN)				iOS	Tactical RPG		
2012	Beyond the Labyrinth (EN) ラビリンスの彼方 (JA)	Tri-Ace	Konami		3DS	Action RPG, Dungeon crawl		
2012	Borderlands 2 (EN)	Gearbox Software, Iron Galaxy Studios, Aspyr	2K Games	Sci-Fi	LIN, WIN, PS3, MAC, X360, PSV	FPS, Action RPG, Open world	Borderlands	
2012	Bravely Default (EN) ブレイブリーデフォルト (JA)	Square Enix, Silicon Studio	Nintendo, Square Enix		3DS			
2012	Call of Cthulhu: The Wasted Land (EN)	Red Wasp Design Ltd			DROID, WIN, iOS	Tactical RPG		
2012	Chaos Rings II (EN)	Media.Vision	Square Enix		DROID, iOS			
2012	ChronoBlade (EN) クロノブレイド (JA)				DROID, iOS	Action RPG		
2012	Code of Princess (EN) コード・オブ・プリンセス (JA)	Bones	Atlus		3DS	Action RPG		
2012	Conception: Ore no Kodomo wo Undekure! (EN); CONCEPTION 俺の子供を産んでくれ! (JA)	Spike	Spike Chunsoft		PSP			
2012	Confrontation (EN)	Cyanide	Focus Home Interactive		WIN			
2012	Diablo III (EN) ディアブロ3 (JA)	Blizzard Entertainment	Blizzard Entertainment	Fantasy	WIN, PS3, MAC, X360, PS4, XOne	Action RPG, Dungeon crawl, Hack and slash	Diablo	NA
2012	Digimon World Re:Digitize (EN) デジモンワールド リ:デジタイズ (JA)	Tri-Crescendo	Bandai Namco Entertainment	Fictional crossover	PSP		Digimon	
2012	Disgaea 3: Absence of Justice	NIS	NIS	Fantasy	PSV (Port)	Tactical RPG	Port\remake of Disgaea 3: Absence of Justice for PS3.	JP
2012	Dragon Quest X: Mezameshi Itsutsu no Shuzoku Online	Square Enix; Armor Project	Square Enix	Fantasy	Wii	MMORPG	Sequel to Dragon Quest IX Hoshizora no Mamoribito.	JP
2012	Dragon's Dogma (EN)	Capcom	Capcom	Fantasy	PS3, WIN, X360	Action RPG, Open world		
2012	Dungelot (EN)				DROID, WIN, iOS	Roguelike		
2012	Dust: An Elysian Tail (EN)	Humble Hearts	Microsoft Studios		WIN, MAC, X360, iOS, PS4	Action RPG		
2012	Etrian Odyssey IV: Legends of the Titan (EN) 世界樹の迷宮IV 伝承の巨神 (JA); Sekaiju no Meikyū IV: Denshō no Kyojin (JA)	Atlus	Atlus, Nippon Ichi Software		3DS			JP
2012	Fable: The Journey (EN)	Lionhead Studios	Microsoft Studios	Fantasy	X360	Action RPG, Open world	Fable	
2012	Fantasy Life (EN) ファンタジーライフ (JA)	Level-5, 1-Up Studio, h.a.n.d.	Level-5		3DS			
2012	Fighting Fantasy: Blood of the Zombies	Tin Man Games	Tin Man Games	Fantasy	DROID, iOS		Fighting Fantasy	AUS
2012	Final Fantasy XIII-2	Square Enix; 1st Production Department tri-Ace	Square Enix	Fantasy	PS3; X360		Final Fantasy	JP
2012	Fire Emblem: Awakening (EN) ファイアーエムブレム 覚醒 (JA)	Intelligent Systems	Nintendo		3DS	Tactical RPG	Fire Emblem	
2012	Game of Thrones (EN)	Cyanide	Atlus, Focus Home Interactive		WIN, PS3, X360	Action RPG	A Song of Ice and Fire	FR
2012	Generation of Chaos: Pandora’s Reflection (EN) ジェネレーション オブ カオス6 (JA)	Sting Entertainment	Nippon Ichi Software		PSP	Tactical RPG		
2012	Genso Suikoden: Tsumugareshi Hyakunen no Toki (EN) 幻想水滸伝 紡がれし百年の時 (JA)	Konami			PSP		Suikoden	
2012	Grim Dawn (EN)	Crate Entertainment			WIN	Action RPG, Hack and slash, Open world		
2012	Harvest Moon 2 (EN) 牧場物語GB2 (JA)	Victor Interactive Software	Natsume	Fantasy, Slice of Life	3DS (Port)	Simulation	Harvest Moon	
2012	Harvest Moon 3 (EN) 牧場物語GB3 ボーイ・ミーツ・ガール (JA)	Victor Interactive Software	Natsume	Fantasy, Slice of Life	3DS (Port)	Simulation	Harvest Moon	
2012	Harvest Moon DS: Grand Bazaar (EN) 牧場物語 ようこそ!風のバザールへ (JA)	Marvelous Entertainment	Natsume	Fantasy, Slice of Life	DS		Harvest Moon	
2012	Heroes of Ruin (EN)	n-Space	Square Enix		3DS	Action RPG		
2012	Hyperdimension Neptunia Victory (EN) 神次元ゲイムネプテューヌV(ビクトリィー (JA)	Idea Factory	Compile Heart	Magical girl	PS3	Sci-Fi, Fantasy, Cyberpunk	Hyperdimension Neptunia	JP
2012	Inazuma Eleven 1-2-3!! Endō Mamoru densetsu (EN) イナズマイレブン1 · 2 · 3 !!:円堂守伝説 (JA)	Level-5	Level-5		3DS			JP
2012	Inazuma Eleven GO 2: Chrono Stone (EN) イナズマイレブンGO2 クロノ・ストーン ネップウ／ライメイ (JA)	Level-5	Level-5		3DS		Inazuma Eleven	
2012	Inazuma Eleven GO Strikers 2013 (EN)	Level-5			Wii		Inazuma Eleven	
2012	King's Bounty: Warriors of the North (EN)		1C Company		WIN	Tactical RPG	King's Bounty	RU
2012	Kingdom Hearts 3D: Dream Drop Distance (EN) キングダム ハーツ 3D ［ドリーム ドロップ ディスタンス］ (JA)	Square Enix	Square Enix	Fictional crossover	3DS	Action RPG	Kingdom Hearts	
2012	Kingdoms of Amalur: Reckoning (EN)	Big Huge Games, 38 Studios	Electronic Arts	Fantasy	WIN, PS3, X360	Action RPG, Open world		NA
2012	Krater (EN)	Fatshark			WIN, MAC			
2012	Legasista (EN)		Nippon Ichi Software		PS3	Action RPG		
2012	Legend of Grimrock (EN)	Almost Human	Almost Human	Fantasy	LIN, WIN, MAC	Action RPG, Dungeon crawl		FI
2012	Malevolence: The Sword of Ahkranox (EN)				WIN	Dungeon crawl		AU
2012	Mass Effect 3 (EN)	BioWare	Electronic Arts	Sci-fi	WIN, PS3, X360, WiiU	Action RPG, TPS	Mass Effect trilogy	NA
2012	Mass Effect: Infiltrator (EN)		Electronic Arts	Sci-fi	DROID, iOS		Mass Effect	
2012	Mobile Suit Gundam AGE (EN)	Level-5	Bandai Namco Entertainment	Sci-Fi, Mecha	PSP	Action RPG		
2012	Mugen Souls (EN) 圧倒的遊戯 ムゲンソウルズ (JA)	Compile Heart	Nippon Ichi Software		PS3			
2012	Mystic Chronicles (EN)	Kemco	Natsume		PSP			
2012	Mythos (EN)	Flagship Studios	HanbitSoft		WIN	Action RPG		
2012	The Legend of Nayuta: Boundless Trails (EN) 那由多の軌跡 (JA)	Nihon Falcom	Nihon Falcom		PSP	Action RPG		
2012	Of Orcs and Men (EN)	Cyanide	Focus Home Interactive	Fantasy	WIN, PS3, X360		Action RPG	FR
2012	One Piece: Romance Dawn (EN) ワンピース ROMANCE DAWN 冒険の夜明け (JA)	YouTube	Bandai Namco Entertainment	Fantasy, Pirate, Steampunk	PSP		list of One Piece video games	
2012	Outernauts (EN)	Insomniac Games	Electronic Arts		WEB, iOS			US
2012	Paper Mario: Sticker Star (EN) ペーパーマリオ スーパーシール (JA)	Nintendo	Nintendo	Fantasy	3DS			
2012	Phantasy Star Online 2 (EN) ファンタシースターオンライン2 (JA)	Sega Games	Sega Games, AsiaSoft	Sci-Fi	DROID, WIN, iOS, PSV, PS4	Action RPG, MMORPG	Phantasy Star, Phantasy Star Online	JP
2012	Pixel Dungeon (EN)				DROID, LIN, WIN, MAC, iOS	Roguelike		RU
2012	Pokémon Black and White 2 (EN) ポケットモンスター ブラック2・ホワイト2 (JA)	Game Freak	Nintendo	Fantasy	DS		Pokémon main series	
2012	Pokémon Conquest (EN) ポケモン+ノブナガの野望 (JA)	Koei Tecmo Holdings	Nintendo, The Pokémon Company	Fantasy, Fictional crossover	DS	Tactical RPG	Pokémon, Nobunaga's Ambition	
2012	Project X Zone (EN) プロジェクト クロスゾーン (JA)	Banpresto	Bandai Namco Entertainment	Fictional crossover	3DS	Tactical RPG		
2012	Ragnarok Odyssey (EN) ラグナロク オデッセイ (JA)	Game Arts	GungHo Online Entertainment		PS3, PSV		Ragnarok Online	
2012	Rainbow Moon (EN)				PS3, PSV	Tactical RPG		
2012	Risen 2: Dark Waters (EN)	Piranha Bytes	Deep Silver	Fantasy	WIN, PS3, X360	Action RPG, Open world	Risen	NA
2012	Rune Factory 4 (EN) ルーンファクトリー4 (JA)	Neverland	Marvelous	Fantasy, Slice of Life	3DS	Simulation	Rune Factory	
2012	Saturday Morning RPG (EN)	Mighty Rabbit Studios		Modern, Superhero	WIN, iOS			
2012	Persona 4 Golden	Atlus	Atlus; Square Enix; Ubisoft	Fantasy	PSV (Port)		Enhanced port of Persona 4 for PS2.	JP
2012	Shining Blade (EN) シャイニング・ブレイド (JA)	Sega Games	Sega Games		PSP		Shining	
2012	Silversword (EN)			Fantasy	iOS			
2012	Skylanders: Giants (EN)	Toys For Bob	Activision Publishing, Inc.	Fantasy	WIN, Wii, PS3, X360, WiiU, 3DS		Skylanders	
2012	Sol Trigger (EN) ソールトリガー (JA)	Imageepoch			PSP			
2012	Spellforce 2: Faith in Destiny (EN)		THQ Nordic	Fantasy	WIN		Spellforce	
2012	Tales of Maj'Eyal (EN)	Netcore Games	Netcore Games		LIN, WIN, MAC, MAC	Roguelike		
2012	Tales of the World: Tactics Union (EN) テイルズ オブ ザ ワールド タクティクス ユニオン (JA)	Bandai Namco Entertainment		Fictional crossover	DROID, iOS	Tactical RPG	Tales	
2012	Tales of Xillia 2 (EN) テイルズ オブ エクシリア2 (JA)	Bandai Namco Entertainment	Bandai Namco Entertainment		PS3		Tales	
2012	Tanken Driland (EN) 探検ドリランド (JA); Tanken Dorirando (JA)			Fantasy	DROID, iOS			JP
2012	The Denpa Men: They Came By Wave (EN) 電波人間のRPG (JA)	Genius Sonority	Genius Sonority		3DS			
2012	The Elder Scrolls V: Skyrim — Dawnguard (EN)	Bethesda Game Studios	Bethesda Softworks	Fantasy	WIN, PS3, X360	Open world, Action RPG	The Elder Scrolls	
2012	The Elder Scrolls V: Skyrim — Dragonborn (EN)	Bethesda Game Studios	Bethesda Softworks	Fantasy	WIN, PS3, X360	Action RPG, Open world	The Elder Scrolls	
2012	The Elder Scrolls V: Skyrim — Hearthfire (EN)	Bethesda Game Studios	Bethesda Softworks	Fantasy	WIN, PS3, X360	Action RPG, Open world	The Elder Scrolls	
2012	The Walking Dead: Season One (EN) ウォーキング・デッド (JA)	Telltale Games	Telltale Games	Horror, Modern	DROID, WIN, PS3, MAC, X360, iOS, PSP, PSV, PS4, XOne	Graphic Adventure	The Walking Dead	
2012	Time and Eternity (EN) 時と永遠 〜トキトワ〜 (JA)	Imageepoch	Bandai Namco Entertainment		PS3			
2012	Torchlight II (EN)	Runic Games	Runic Games		LIN, WIN, MAC	Action RPG, Open world		
2012	Tynon (EN)				WIN	Tactical RPG		
2012	Ultima IX: Ascension (EN)	Origin Systems	Electronic Arts		WIN		Ultima	
2012	Vox (EN)				WIN	Open world, Adventure		
2012	Witcher 2, The: Assassins of Kings	CD Projekt Red	CD Projekt Red (POL); Atari (NA); Namco Bandai Games (EU)	Fantasy	X360 (Port); MAC (Port)	Action RPG	Port of The Witcher 2: Assassins of Kings for Windows. Sequel to The Witcher. Based on the novels of the same name.	PL
2012	Ys: Memories of Celceta (EN) イース セルセタの樹海 (JA)	Nihon Falcom	Nihon Falcom		PSV	Action RPG	Ys	
2012	Zenonia 4 (EN)	Gamevil			DROID	Action RPG		
2013	99 Levels to Hell (EN)	B-evil, Zaxis Games	Zaxis Games		WIN, MAC			
2013	Aarklash: Legacy	Cyanide Studio	Cyanide Studio	Fantasy	WIN	Dungeon crawl		
2013	Akaneiro: Demon Hunters (EN)	Spicy Horse		Dark fantasy	WIN, MAC	Hack and slash, Action RPG		
2013	Ascend: New Gods (EN)	Signal Studios	Microsoft Studios		WIN, X360			
2013	Atelier Escha & Logy: Alchemists of the Dusk Sky (EN) エスカ&ロジーのアトリエ 〜黄昏の空の錬金術士〜 (JA)	Gust Co. Ltd.	Koei Tecmo Holdings		PS3, PSV		Atelier	JP
2013	Avadon 2: The Corruption (EN)	Spiderweb Software		Fantasy	WIN, iOS, OSX	Dungeon crawl	Sequel to Avadon: The Black Fortress	
2013	Baldur's Gate II: Enhanced Edition (EN)	Beamdog	Atari	Fantasy	DROID, WIN, iOS		Baldur's Gate	
2013	Banner Saga, The (EN)	Stoic	Versus Evil		DROID, LIN, WIN, MAC, iOS, PS4	Tactical RPG		
2013	Charlie Murder (EN)	Ska Studios	Microsoft Studios		X360	Action RPG, Beat 'em up		
2013	Covenant of Solitude (EN)		Kemco		DROID, iOS			
2013	Cube World (EN)				WIN	Open world		
2013	Dark Eye, The: Demonicon (EN)		Kalypso Media		WIN, PS3, X360			
2013	Dead Island: Riptide (EN)	Techland	Deep Silver		WIN, PS3, X360	Action RPG, Open world	Dead Island	
2013	Demon Gaze (EN) デモンゲイズ (ゲーム) (JA)	Kadokawa Shoten	Europe		PSV			
2013	Desktop Dungeons (EN)	QCF Design	QCF Design		WIN, MAC, GNU/LIN			
2013	Deus Ex: The Fall (EN)	Eidos Montreal	Square Enix	Sci-Fi, Cyberpunk	DROID, WIN, iOS	Action RPG, FPS	Deus Ex	
2013	Digimon Adventure (EN)	Prope	Bandai Namco Entertainment	Fictional crossover, Modern, Cyberpunk	PSP		Digimon	
2013	Disgaea D2: A Brighter Darkness (EN) ディスガイア D2 (JA)	Nippon Ichi Software		Fantasy	PS3	Tactical RPG	Disgaea	
2013	Divinity: Dragon Commander (EN)	Larian Studios			WIN	TPS		
2013	DoomRL (EN)				LIN, WIN	Roguelike		
2013	Dragon's Crown (EN) ドラゴンズクラウン (JA)	Vanillaware	Nippon Ichi Software		PS3, PSV	Action RPG		
2013	Drakengard 3 (EN) ドラッグオンドラグーン3 (JA)	Access Games	Square Enix		PS3	Action RPG	Drakengard	
2013	Driftmoon	Instant Kingdom		Fantasy	WIN; LIN; OSX	WRPG		FI
2013	Dungeon Defenders (EN)	Trendy Entertainment	Reverb Triple XP		DROID, LIN, WIN, PS3, MAC, iOS	Tower defense		
2013	Dungeonland (EN)	Critical Studio	Paradox Interactive		WIN, MAC	Action RPG		
2013	Eldritch (EN)	Minor Key Games			LIN, WIN, MAC	Roguelike, FPS		
2013	Etrian Odyssey Untold: The Millennium Girl (EN) 新・世界樹の迷宮 ミレニアムの少女 (JA)	Atlus	Nippon Ichi Software		3DS			
2013	Expeditions: Conquistador (EN)	Logic Artists	bitcomposer Entertainment		LIN, WIN, MAC	Tactical RPG	Expeditions	DK
2013	Exstetra (EN) エクステトラ (JA)				PSV			
2013	Fairy Fencer F (EN) フェアリーフェンサー エフ (JA)	Compile Heart	Idea Factory		WIN, PS3			
2013	Fallout: Project Brazil (EN)			Post-apocalyptic, Sci-Fi	WIN	Action RPG	Fallout	
2013	Family Farm Seaside (EN)	FunPlus	FunPlus		DROID, iOS	Simulation		CN
2013	Final Fantasy IV: The After Years (EN)	Matrix Software	Square Enix	Fantasy	IOS, DROID, WIN	Turn-based	3D remake of Final Fantasy IV: The After Years for phones, Wii and PSP	JP
2013	Forced (EN)				WIN	Action RPG		
2013	GOD EATER 2 Rage Burst (EN)	Shift, Q16594238	Bandai Namco Entertainment		PSV, PS4	Action RPG	Gods Eater Burst	
2013	Guided Fate Paradox, The (EN) 神様と運命革命のパラドクス (JA)	Nippon Ichi Software	NIS America	Fantasy	PS3	Dungeon crawl		JP
2013	How to Survive (EN)		505 Games		WIN, PS4, XOne	Action RPG, Survival horror		
2013	Hyperdimension Neptunia Re;Birth 1 (EN) 超次次元ゲイム ネプテューヌ (JA)	Idea Factory	Compile Heart	Fantasy, Sci-Fi, Cyberpunk, Magical girl	PSV, WIN		Enhanced Remake of Hyperdimension Neptunia	JP
2013	Inazuma Eleven GO 3: Galaxy (EN) イナズマイレブンGO3 ギャラクシー ビッグバン/スーパーノヴァ (JA)	Level-5	Level-5		3DS		Inazuma Eleven	
2013	Incredible Adventures of Van Helsing, The (EN)	NeocoreGames	NeocoreGames		WIN, X360	Action RPG		
2013	Infinity Blade III (EN)	Chair Entertainment			iOS	Action RPG		
2013	Kamen Rider Battle Ride Wars (EN) 仮面ライダー バトライド・ウォー (JA)	Bandai Namco Holdings	Bandai Namco Holdings	Modern, Superhero	PS3	Action RPG		
2013	Legend of Dungeon (EN)	Robot Loves Kitty			WIN	Roguelike		
2013	The Legend of Heroes: Trails of Cold Steel (EN) 閃の軌跡 (JA)	Nihon Falcom	Nihon Falcom		PS3, PSV		Trails	
2013	Legend of Sword and Fairy 5 Prequel, The (EN)				WIN			
2013	Leviathan: The Last Defense (EN) 絶対防衛レヴィアタン (JA); Zettai Bōei Reviatan (JA)			Fantasy	DROID, iOS			JP
2013	Lightning Returns: Final Fantasy XIII (EN) ライトニング リターンズ ファイナルファンタジーXIII (JA)	Square Enix			WIN, PS3, X360	Open world	Final Fantasy, Fabula Nova Crystallis Final Fantasy	
2013	Mars: War Logs (EN)	Spiders	Focus Home Interactive		WIN, PS3, PSP	Action RPG		
2013	Metal Max 4: Gekkō no Diva (EN) メタルマックス4 月光のディーヴァ (JA)		Kadokawa Shoten		3DS		Metal Max	
2013	Mind Zero (EN)	Acquire	GungHo Online Entertainment		PSV			
2013 (JP/KR)	Monster Hunter 4 (EN)	Capcom	Capcom	Fantasy	3DS	Action RPG	Monster Hunter	JP
2013	Monster Hunter Frontier G (EN)	Capcom	Capcom	Fantasy	WIN	Action RPG	Monster Hunter, expansion of Monster Hunter Frontier	JP
2013	Pacific Rim (video game) (EN)	Yuke's, Reliance Entertainment	Warner Bros. Interactive Entertainment	Sci-fi, Mecha	DROID, iOS, XBLA	Action RPG, Fighting game		
2013	Path of Exile (EN)	Grinding Gear Games	Steam, Garena		WIN, XOne	Action RPG, Hack and slash		
2013	Pokémon X and Y (EN) ポケットモンスター X・Y (JA)	Game Freak	Nintendo, Creatures, Game Freak, The Pokémon Company	Fantasy	3DS		Pokémon main series	JP
2013	Reaper: Tale of a Pale Swordsman (EN)	Hexage			DROID, WIN, iOS	Action RPG		
2013	Risk of Rain (EN)	Hopoo Games, LLC	Chucklefish		WIN, MAC, PSV, GNU/LIN	Roguelike, Platform game		
2013	Scrolls (EN)	Mojang	Mojang		DROID, WIN			
2013	Sei Madou Monogatari (EN)	Compile Heart	Compile Heart		PSV			
2013	Shadowrun Returns (EN)	Harebrained Schemes		Cyberpunk	DROID, LIN, WIN, iOS, OSX	Tactical RPG	Shadowrun	NA
2013	Shin Megami Tensei IV (EN) 真・女神転生IV (JA)	Atlus	Nintendo	Modern	3DS		Megami Tensei	
2013	Shining Ark (EN) シャイニング・アーク (JA)	Media.Vision	Sega Games		PSP		Shining	
2013	Skylanders: Swap Force (EN)	Vicarious Visions	Activision Publishing, Inc.	Fantasy	Wii, PS3, X360, WiiU, 3DS, PS4, XOne		Skylanders	
2013	Summon Night 5 (EN) サモンナイト5 (JA)		Bandai Namco Holdings		PSP	Tactical RPG	Summon Night	
2013	Super Robot Wars UX (EN) スーパーロボット大戦UX (JA)	Banpresto	Bandai Namco Entertainment		3DS	Tactical RPG	Super Robot Wars	
2013	Sword Art Online: Infinity Moment (EN) ソードアート・オンライン -インフィニティ・モーメント (JA); Sōdo Āto Onrain: Infiniti Mōmento (JA)		Bandai Namco Entertainment	Sci-fi, Cyberpunk	PSP		Sword Art Online	JP
2013	Sword of the Stars: The Pit (EN)	Kerberos Productions			WIN	Roguelike		
2013	Tales of Symphonia Chronicles (EN) テイルズ オブ シンフォニア ユニゾナントパック (JA)	Bandai Namco Entertainment	Bandai Namco Entertainment		PS3		Tales	
2013	Valhalla Knights 3 (EN)		Marvelous		PSV		Valhalla Knights	
2013	Witch and The Hundred Knights, The (EN) 魔女と百騎兵 (JA)	Nippon Ichi Software	Nippon Ichi Software		PS3			
2013	Word Realms (EN)	Asymmetric Publications			LIN			
