= Italian Video Game Awards =

Annual awards for video game achievements

Italian Game Video Game Awards
- Awarded for: Excellence in the world of video games
- Country: United Kingdom
- Formerly called: Drago d'Oro
- First award: April 2013; 13 years ago
- Website: https://italianvideogameawards.com/, http://premiodragodoro.it/

The Italian Video Game Awards (IVGA, known as Drago d'Oro from 2013 to 2017) are annual awards recognising excellence in the video game industry.

The event is organised by the Italian Interactive Digital Entertainment Association (IIDEA).

The award has presented ceremonies rewarding both international and Italian video games and others focused exclusively on Italian games.

== Categories and winners ==
=== 2013 ===
==== Popular Categories ====
- Best Mobile Game – The Walking Dead
- Best Nintendo DS/Nintendo 3DS Game – Professor Layton and the Miracle Mask
- Best PC Game – Far Cry 3
- Best PlayStation 3 Game – Assassin's Creed III
- Best PlayStation Vita game – Uncharted: Golden Abyss
- Best Xbox 360 Game – Halo 4
- Best Wii/Wii U Game – ZombiU
- Game of the Year – Assassin's Creed III

==== Technical Categories ====
- Best Action Game – Dishonored
- Best Casual Game – Skylanders: Giants
- Best Fighting Game – Tekken Tag Tournament 2
- Best First-Person Shooter Game – Borderlands 2
- Best Racing Game – F1 2012
- Best Role-Playing Game – Dragon's Dogma
- Best Sports Game – FIFA 13
- Surprise of the Year – Dishonored
- Technical Jury Special Award – Mass Effect 3

==== Artistic Categories ====
- Critics' Jury Special Award – Journey
- Best Gameplay – Dishonored
- Best Graphics – Far Cry 3
- Best International Indie Game – Papo & Yo
- Best Italian Indie Game – Battleloot Adventure
- Best Leading Character – Commander Shepard (Mass Effect 3)
- Best Multiplayer – Guild Wars 2
- Best Non-leading Character – Nick Carlyle (Lollipop Chainsaw)
- Best Screenplay – Spec Ops: The Line
- Best Setting – Journey
- Best Soundtrack – Max Payne 3

=== 2014 ===
==== International awards ====
- Best Action-Adventure Game – Grand Theft Auto V
- Best Casual Game – Skylanders: Swap Force
- Best Character – Lara Croft (Tomb Raider)
- Best First-Person Shooter Game – BioShock Infinite
- Best Gameplay – Grand Theft Auto V
- Best Graphics – Ryse: Son of Rome
- Best Indie Game – Brothers: A Tale of two Sons
- Best Platform Game – Rayman Legends
- Best Racing Game – Forza Motorsport 5
- Best Role-Playing Game – Ni no Kuni: Wrath of the White Witch
- Best Screenplay – The Last of Us
- Best Sports Game – NBA 2K14
- Best Strategy Game – Pikmin 3
- Best Soundtrack – The Last of Us
- Game of the Year – The Last of Us
- Jury Special Award – Tearaway
- People's Choice – The Last of Us

Italian awards

- Best Artistic Achievement – MirrorMoon EP
- Best Game – Joe Dever's Lone Wolf
- Best Game Design – Joe Dever's Lone Wolf
- Best Technical Achievement – Assetto Corsa

=== 2015 ===
==== International awards ====
- Best Action Game – Middle-earth: Shadow of Mordor
- Best App – Monument Valley
- Best Casual Game – Super Smash Bros. for Nintendo 3DS and Wii U
- Best Character – Bayonetta (Bayonetta 2)
- Best DLC/Expansion – World of Warcraft: Warlords of Draenor
- Best First-Person Shooter Game – Destiny
- Best Gameplay – Destiny
- Best Graphics – Assassin's Creed: Unity
- Best Indie Game – The Vanishing of Ethan Carter
- Best Platform Game – Murasaki Baby
- Best Racing Game – Mario Kart 8
- Best Role-Playing Game – Dark Souls II
- Best Screenplay – The Last of Us: Left Behind
- Best-Selling Game – FIFA 15
- Best Setting – Assassin's Creed: Unity
- Best Soundtrack – Transistor
- Best Sports Game – Pro Evolution Soccer 2015
- Best Strategy Game – Hearthstone
- Game of the Year – Destiny
- Jury Special Award – Valiant Hearts: The Great War
- People's Choice – Dragon Age: Inquisition

==== Italian awards ====
- Best Artistic Achievement – Murasaki Baby
- Best Game – Murasaki Baby
- Best Game Design – In Space We Brawl
- Best Technical Achievement – SBK14 Official Mobile Game

=== 2016 ===
==== International awards ====
- Best Action-Adventure Game – Batman: Arkham Knight
- Best App – Her Story
- Best Character – Max Caulfield (Life Is Strange)
- Best Family Game – Disney Infinity 3.0
- Best First-Person Shooter Game – Splatoon
- Best Gameplay – Bloodborne
- Best Graphics – The Order: 1886
- Best Indie Game – Her Story
- Best Platform Game – Ori and the Blind Forest
- Best Racing Game – Forza Motorsport 6
- Best Role-Playing Game – The Witcher 3: Wild Hunt
- Best Screenplay – Life Is Strange
- Best-Selling Game – FIFA 16
- Best Soundtrack – Ori and the Blind Forest
- Best Sports Game – Rocket League
- Best Strategy Game – StarCraft II: Legacy of the Void
- Game of the Year – The Witcher 3: Wild Hunt
- Most Innovative Game – Her Story
- People's Choice – The Witcher 3: Wild Hunt

==== Italian awards ====
- Best Artistic Achievement – N.E.R.O.: Nothing Ever Remains Obscure
- Best Game – N.E.R.O.: Nothing Ever Remains Obscure
- Best Game Design – In Verbis Virtus
- Best Technical Achievement – Ride

=== 2017 ===
==== International awards ====
- Best Action-Adventure Game – Uncharted 4: A Thief's End
- Best App – Pokémon Go
- Best Character – Trico (The Last Guardian)
- Best Gameplay – Overwatch
- Best Family Game – Lego Dimensions
- Best First-Person Shooter Game – Titanfall 2
- Best Graphics – Uncharted 4: A Thief's End
- Best Indie Game – Inside
- Best Platform Game – Super Mario Run
- Best Racing Game – Forza Horizon 3
- Best Role-Playing Game – Dark Souls III
- Best Screenplay – Firewatch
- Best Soundtrack – The Last Guardian
- Best Sports Game – NBA 2K17
- Best Strategy Game – Civilization VI
- Game of the Year – Final Fantasy XV
- Most Innovative Game – Batman: Arkham VR
- People's Choice – Uncharted 4: A Thief's End

==== Italian awards ====
- Best Artistic Achievement – The Town of Light
- Best Game – Redout
- Best Game Design – Little Briar Rose
- Best Technical Achievement – Valentino Rossi: The Game

=== 2018 ===
- Best Art Direction – Cuphead
- Best Audio – Nier: Automata
- Best Character – Senua (Hellblade: Senua's Sacrifice)
- Best Evolving Game – Grand Theft Auto Online: The Doomsday Heist
- Best Family Game – Mario + Rabbids Kingdom Battle
- Best Game Design – Super Mario Odyssey
- Best Indie Game – What Remains of Edith Finch
- Best Italian Debut Game – Downward
- Best Italian Game – Mario + Rabbids Kingdom Battle
- Best Mobile Game – Monument Valley 2
- Best Narrative – Prey
- Best-Selling Game – FIFA 18
- Game Beyond Entertainment – Last Day of June
- Game of the Year – The Legend of Zelda: Breath of the Wild
- Innovative Award – PlayerUnknown's Battlegrounds
- People's Choice – Horizon Zero Dawn
- Radio 105 eSport of the Year – Tom Clancy's Rainbow Six Siege

=== 2019 ===
- Best Art Direction – Red Dead Redemption 2
- Best Audio – Red Dead Redemption 2
- Best Character – Connor (Detroit: Become Human)
- Best Company – Milestone
- Best Esports Player – Riccardo Romiti
- Best Esports Team – Samsung Morning Stars
- Best Game Design – God of War
- Best Evolving Game – Fortnite Battle Royale
- Best Indie Game – Gris
- Best Individual – Massimo Guarini
- Best Italian Debut Game – Bud Spencer & Terence Hill: Slaps and Beans
- Best Italian Game – Remothered: Tormented Fathers
- Best Mobile Game – Florence
- Best Family Game – Nintendo Labo
- Best Narrative – Detroit: Become Human
- Best-Selling Game – FIFA 19
- Best Sports Game – Forza Horizon 4
- Esport Game of the Year – Overwatch
- Game Beyond Entertainment – Detroit: Become Human
- Game of the Year – Red Dead Redemption 2
- Innovation Award – Xbox Adaptive Controller
- People's Choice – God of War
- Special Award – Antura and the Letters

=== 2020 ===
- Best Innovation – Secret Oops!
- Best Italian Debut Game – Football Drama
- Best Italian Game – Close to the Sun
- Outstanding Individual Company – Stormind Games
- Outstanding Individual Contribution – Luisa Bixio

=== 2021 ===
- Best Innovation – Griefhelm
- Best Italian Debut Game – Beyond Your Window
- Best Italian Game – Promesa
- Outstanding Individual Company – Santa Ragione
- Outstanding Individual Contribution – Mauro Fanelli

=== 2022 ===
- Best Innovation – Martha Is Dead
- Best Italian Debut Game – Vesper
- Best Italian Game – Hot Wheels Unleashed
- Outstanding Individual Company – Nacon Studio Milan
- Outstanding Individual Contribution – Ivan Venturi

=== 2023 ===
- Best Innovation – Saturnalia
- Best Italian Debut Game – Venice 2089
- Best Italian Game – tERRORbane
- Outstanding Individual Company – Ubisoft Milan
- Outstanding Individual Contribution – Cristina Nava

=== 2024 ===
- Best Italian Debut Game – dotAGE
- Best Italian Game – Mediterranea Inferno
- Best Outstanding Art – Universe for Sale
- Best Outstanding Experience – Mediterranea Inferno
- Outstanding Individual Company – Untold Games
- Outstanding Individual Contribution – Elisa Farinetti
