= Shooting Love, 200X =

2009 video game

Shooting Love. 200X
- Limited edition cover art
- Developer: Triangle Service
- Publisher: Triangle Service
- Platforms: Xbox 360, Steam
- Release: JP: February 19, 2009; NA: April 21, 2015; PAL: April 21, 2015
- Genre: Shoot 'em up
- Modes: Single-player, multiplayer

Shooting Love. 200X is a compilation of Shooting Love. 2007 (itself, an arcade compilation including Exzeal and Shmups Skill Test), Trizeal Remix, and Minus Zero. Shooting Love. 200X was released in North America and Europe (limited to ESRB and PEGI countries) via Xbox Games on Demand on April 21, 2015.

== Features ==
Additions made to Shooting Love, 2007 include:

- Score attack mode for each stage, replay saves and playback, reconfigurable difficulty (5 levels) expanded, and controller on Exzeal
- 4-player versus mode in Shmups Skill Test, hidden challenge mode for 11 stages.
- Replay saves and playback on Trizeal Remix
- Online leaderboards with regular and weekly ranking categories for each game
- Advanced screen adjustments, and audio adjustments.

== Games ==
=== Exzeal ===
Exzeal

Exzeal follows a similar formula to Trizeal in which players progress through the stages and destroy the bosses respectively. However, the weapon power-up system from Trizeal was replaced by the special fixed-weapon system, with a standard attack and a charged attack that can destroy single large enemies once. The player can choose from one of the four weapon sets during the start, with one mimicking the attack pattern of XII Stag.

The game was later rereleased as a standalone game on Steam in 2016.

=== Shmups Skill Test ===
Shmups Skill Test modes include: 1-player test, favorite game practice, 2-player versus modes, and 4-player versus.

1-player test includes 10 sets of stages for a total of 20 stages. At the end of the test, the player's result is judged by 6 categories, with final evaluations of the shop average score, the player's final test score, player's gamer age. 2-player versus includes 3 stage types.

Favorite game practice allows players to choose 5 practice stages from 16 available stages within 1 credit, with hidden score attack and score attack mix modes. After completing the hidden score attack or score attack mix mode, a password is shown to allow player to register the game result through the game's Internet ranking site.

4-player versus modes (from Shooting Love. 200X) is a 4-player variant of the promotion game title Shooting Love. 8, and adds a test category.

=== Minus Zero ===
Minus Zero is an endless shooter with abstract characters. Similar to the other games featured in this compilation, it includes replay saves and playback, and online leaderboards.

== Release ==
A limited edition of Shooting Love, 200X included a superplay called Insanity Nice DVD2!. with expert replays for the Shooting Love. 2007 edition of Exzeal by UNIT-1 by TSP, UNIT-2 by Zen Nippon Aloë wo aiteru kai, UNIT-3 by CYR-Setaro~, UNIT-4 by UMC(hinakko), and the arcade edition of Shmups Skill Test by LYH, Kuusoukagakurensharyokusokutei game Sya Watch by S*Sama; Exzeal OUT TAKE, Shooting Love. Koushien highlights footage.

An extra DVD called Shachou Love. 200X was a pre-order bonus which included footage of Toshiaki Fujino and Triangle Service staff during a Shooting Love. Koushien event.

== Reception ==
Bordersdown awarded the Xbox 360 version of Shooting Love, 200X a score of 4/10. Video Chums gave the compilation a 7/10 praising it for its "decent collection of games and modes", particularly that "Trizeal Remix and Exzeal feature great classic shoot 'em up gameplay", but criticized the "overall bland presentation".
