= We Rock =

We Rock may refer to:

- "We Rock" (Camp Rock song), by the cast of the film Camp Rock
- We Rock (video), a 2005 performance video by Dio
- "We Rock", a song by Dio from the 1984 album The Last in Line
- We Rock: Drum King, a 2009 music video game
