= Trizeal =

2005 video game

- Japanese Dreamcast cover art
- Developer: Triangle Service
- Publishers: Taito; Triangle Service (DC); Datam Polystar (PS2); BBMF (i-mode, YM)
- Designers: T.Fujino (producer, programmer)
- Artist: H.Toki
- Composer: NAOTO
- Platforms: Arcade, Dreamcast, PlayStation 2, i-mode, Yahoo Mobile
- Release: Arcade: JP: 2004; Dreamcast: JP: 7 April 2005; PlayStation 2: JP: 20 April 2006; i-mode & Yahoo Mobile: JP: 25 September 2006
- Genre: Scrolling shooter
- Mode: Single-player
- Arcade system: Sega NAOMI GD-ROM

Trizeal is a Japanese vertically scrolling shooter developed by Triangle Service and released as an arcade video game in 2005. It was ported to the Dreamcast and PlayStation 2.

== Gameplay ==
Players control and can transform a spaceship into three forms (which alternates weapon attacks), working through multiple levels and boss sequences. The game can be played in four different screen modes, with one mode mimicking the narrow arcade version. A ship from Triangle Service's previous release, XII Stag, is hidden in the game and can be unlocked by holding the "X" button before selecting a stage in Stage Attack mode. The power-ups can be used to upgrade each separate weapon respectively.

There are six levels in the game, they get progressively harder until the last stage which consists of only two bosses. Two unlockable modes become available when the game is completed, they are Omake mode and Lifting mode. Omake mode is a short level which has denser bullet patterns than the normal game, lifting mode is where you have to juggle a stone on your ship to score points.

== Marketing ==
Between the arcade and Dreamcast releases of Trizeal, the developer released a 'SOS statement' claiming the arcade game had suffered poor sales. They also said that, if TRIZEAL for Dreamcast did not sell well, the company would not be able to produce the next one. Furthermore, it also claimed it would not be a net-only release because it wanted the game to be displayed in shops.

== Trizeal Remix ==
Trizeal Remix was released for Windows on 7 July 2016.

== Sequel ==
A sequel, Exzeal, was released in 2007.
