= Digital Bros =

Italian video game company

Digital Bros S.p.A.
- Type: Public
- Traded as: BIT: DIB; FTSE All-Share Index
- ISIN: IT0001469995
- Industry: Video games
- Founded: 1989; 37 years ago
- Founders: Abramo and Raffaele Galante
- Headquarters: Milan, Italy
- Area served: Worldwide
- Key people: Abramo Galante; (chairman, CEO); Raffaele Galante; (CEO); Davide Galante; (director); Dario Italo Treves; (director); Stefano Salbe; (CFO)
- Subsidiaries: § Subsidiaries
- Website: digitalbros.com

Digital Bros S.p.A. is an Italian video game company that develops, publishes and distributes games. It publishes games under its 505 Games subsidiary brand since 2007 and established video game development school, Digital Bros Game Academy, in 2014. Digital Bros was founded in 1989 as Halifax and the name is still used for distribution.

Digital Bros is headquartered in Milan with offices in the United Kingdom, United States, France (until 2024), Spain (until 2024), Germany (until 2024), China, Hong Kong and Japan.

== History ==
=== 1989–2000: Founding and growth ===
Halifax S.p.A. was founded in 1989 in Milan, Italy, by the brothers Abramo and Raffaele Galante. In the 1990s, the company had the rights to distribute games of international publishers on the Italian market through its Halifax brand; including Pro Evolution Soccer, Tomb Raider and Resident Evil. It was listed on the STAR segment of the Italian Stock Exchange in 2000.

Digital Bros also operated the European television channel Game Network from 1999 to 2006 and operated European servers for The Legend of Mir series and various other online games under the Game Network brand until 2009.

=== 2001–2014: Internationalization and digitalization ===
In 2006, Digital Bros founded subsidiary 505 Games (505 GameStreet). In 2012, it started publishing games on digital platforms, Steam, PlayStation Network and Xbox Live. In 2013, it established its mobile games division, 505 Games Mobile.

=== 2015–2020: Acquisitions and investments ===
In 2015, Digital Bros acquired DR Studios, a developer based in Milton Keynes, United Kingdom and was made responsible for its Free to Play games. The company acquired a stake of 49% in Ovosonico, a developer based in Varese. In 2017, the group acquired Kunos Simulazioni, a developer specializing in driving simulations, headquartered in Rome, Italy.

In 2020, it announced its intent to generate 50% of its revenue from its own games. On 3 March 2020, Digital Bros acquires 51% of the remaining shares of the Ovosonico studio from Massimo Guarini. The Ovosonico brand remains the property of Massimo Guarini, controlled by Guarini Design, while the development studio, with its employees, has been acquired by Digital Bros.

In November 2023, Digital Bros announced plans to lay off about 30% of its global workforce—around 130 employees—following an organizational review. This decision is attributed to changes in the global games industry and shifts in consumer behavior since the pandemic, with a noted preference for well-established intellectual properties. The company said it would be adjusting its strategy to focus more on sequels and new versions of successful games, reducing the number of new, large-budget projects. Job cuts continued into 2024, when 505 Games offices in Germany, Spain, and France were closed.

== Subsidiaries ==
- 505 Games (formerly 505 GameStreet)
  - 505 Mobile
  - DR Studios
  - Hawken Entertainment
  - Infinity Plus Two
- Avantgarden
- Ingame Studios
- Kunos Simulazioni
- Nesting Games
- Supernova Games

== See also ==
- List of 505 video games
