= Exit (video game) =

2005 video game

- North American cover art
- Developer: Taito (Note: Nintendo DS version developed by MOSS.)
- Publishers: PlayStation Portable, Xbox 360: JP/EU: Taito; NA/AU: Ubisoft; Nintendo DS: JP: Taito; NA/EU: Square Enix; AU: Ubisoft
- Director: Hiroshi Aoki
- Producers: Naoto Tominaga (chief); Seiji Kawakami
- Designers: Hiroshi Aoki; Tomohito Yano; Kōjirō Modeki
- Composer: Hideki Takahagi
- Series: Exit
- Platforms: PlayStation Portable, Xbox 360, Nintendo DS
- Release: PlayStation Portable: JP: December 15, 2005; NA: February 14, 2006; AU: March 30, 2006; EU: March 31, 2006; Xbox 360: WW: October 24, 2007; Nintendo DS: JP: January 24, 2008; AU: October 13, 2008; NA: November 5, 2008; EU: November 7, 2008
- Genre: Puzzle
- Mode: Single-player

Exit is a 2005 puzzle video game developed and published by Taito for the PlayStation Portable. It was released in Japan on December 15, 2005, in North America on February 14, 2006, in Australia on March 30, 2006, and in Europe on March 31, 2006. A version for the Xbox 360 was released via Xbox Live Arcade on October 24, 2007. A version for the Nintendo DS was released in 2008 as Exit DS.

== Overview ==
The basic premise is to lead the main character, Mr. ESC, an escapologist, out of hospitals, underground facilities, offices, and other buildings within a time limit. Along the way, the player gets hindered by obstacles such as fires, earthquakes, floods, or even meteor showers.

Sometimes the player must help trapped individuals escape as well, and it takes quick thinking and planning ahead to exit the building successfully.

== Characters ==
- Mr. ESC: A professional escape artist with an unparalleled eye for coffee.
- Jet: What can be considered as a "villain", but is not much more than a rival escapologist with a jetpack. He only appears if the player brings their companions to their doom or runs out of time.
- Companions: Several NPCs throughout the scenarios from which the player has to escape, be they children, young adults, fat adults, or patients.

== Gameplay ==
Each level includes a starting point for Mr. ESC and an exit point. There may also be one or more trapped individuals within the level, and in many cases, Mr. ESC cannot successfully complete the level unless he rescues some or all of the individuals before he escapes. There is a time limit for completing each level.

Mr. ESC is agile and can swim, run faster, and jump higher than any of the other trapped individuals. However, he is still prone to injury from hazards or from falling from heights.

The individuals come in four types:

- Youngs - These normal-sized people can climb over moderate-height obstacles, can jump, and can also assist each other or Mr. ESC in various tasks.
- Children - Children can only climb over small heights but can be assisted by Mr. ESC or a normal adult. They cannot jump as far as adults but can traverse passages too small for Mr. ESC or other adults.
- Adults - These waddling, large-sized people can push very large objects but cannot climb over moderate obstacles without help from at least two people (Mr. ESC and another adult, or two adults).
- Patients - Injured people must be either carried by Mr. ESC or an adult to the exit, or, if a stretcher is available, wheeled to the exit.

Mr. ESC (the figure with the red tie) carries an injured person down stairs while another adult waits nearby in a collapsing building. Image from the Xbox Live Arcade version.

Except for the injured, the player as Mr. ESC can order these people to perform certain tasks, move to specific locations, or pick up, use, or trade tools on the level; however, until Mr. ESC has touched them, they remain in a panicked state and cannot help. These individuals will not willfully put themselves in a bad situation (they will refuse to make a drop they could not survive, for example), but they can still be injured from an indirect event (dropping a crate on them, for example). If a survivor is injured, they are carried to safety by Jet (a competitor of Mr. ESC). If too many survivors are injured to be able to meet the requirement, or if Mr. ESC himself is injured, the level is over and must be restarted.

Obstacles include crates, which can be used to create platforms to reach higher ledges; fires that must be extinguished before they can be passed; water hazards, which only Mr. ESC can swim in; one-way doors; fallen rock walls; exposed electrical wires; and more. Some tools can be used to remove the obstacle (such as a fire extinguisher to douse a fire or a pickaxe to clear rubble). There are some levels that are dark, and a flashlight is needed to see even part of an area of the level.

After completing a level, a score is given based on the number of people rescued and the par time for the level. 100 points are possible for each level.

There are a total of 100 different levels, which are designed to appeal to the pick-up-and-play qualities of the PSP. 70 stages are available from the start, and the player can then play through them in any order. A player can repeat the level later to try to beat their previous high score. In addition to the packaged levels, 100 more are available for download off the game's website utilizing the PSP's on-board network functionality. The Xbox Live Arcade version has a total of 220 levels.

== Reception ==
Reception

Aggregate score
Aggregator	Score		
Aggregator	DS	PSP	Xbox 360
Metacritic	64/100	77/100	75/100

Review scores
Publication	Score		
Publication	DS	PSP	Xbox 360
Edge	N/A	8/10	N/A
Electronic Gaming Monthly	N/A	7.5/10	N/A
Eurogamer	N/A	8/10	7/10
Famitsu	33/40	34/40	N/A
Game Informer	N/A	7.25/10	N/A
GamePro	3/5	4.5/5	N/A
GameRevolution	C	N/A	N/A
GameSpot	6/10	8/10	8/10
GameSpy	N/A	4.5/5	N/A
GameZone	6.5/10	N/A	N/A
IGN	6.5/10	6.8/10	7.6/10
Nintendo Power	7.5/10	N/A	N/A
Official U.S. PlayStation Magazine	N/A	3.5/5	N/A
Official Xbox Magazine (US)	N/A	N/A	7/10
Detroit Free Press	N/A	3/4	N/A
The Sydney Morning Herald	N/A	3/5	N/A

The PSP and Xbox 360 versions received "generally favorable reviews", while the DS version received "mixed" reviews, according to video game review aggregator Metacritic. In Japan, Famitsu gave the PSP version a score of two nines and two eights for a total of 34 out of 40. The same magazine later gave the DS version one nine and three eights for a total of 33 out of 40.

Charles Herold of The New York Times gave the PSP version a favorable review, saying it was "tremendous fun for fans of logic puzzles, but it has a few annoying quirks. Jumping large gaps in the floor is tricky, and I died far too often doing this. The process for giving commands to other people is a bit cumbersome." Detroit Free Press gave it three stars out of four, saying that it "has enough substance to keep you playing for hours and hours." 411Mania gave the DS version a score of 7.5 out of 10, calling it "a pretty simple game with a simple premise but it's hard to master and get down to a science." However, The Sydney Morning Herald gave the PSP version three stars out of five, calling it "A good mental workout that can prove to be addictive, despite its punishing quirks."

== Sequel ==
In late June 2006, Famitsu revealed that Taito was working on a sequel to Exit titled Kangaeru Exit, released elsewhere as Exit 2. It was released in September 2006; a demo of the sequel was released for download in Japan in November 2006. Eventually the game was released for the Xbox Live Arcade on February 25, 2009.
