= Murasaki Baby =

2014 video game

- Developer: Ovosonico
- Publisher: Sony Computer Entertainment
- Director: Massimo Guarini
- Designer: Massimo Guarini
- Programmer: Massimiliano Pagani
- Composers: Gianni Ricciardi; Akira Yamaoka
- Platform: PlayStation Vita
- Release: NA: September 16, 2014; PAL: September 17, 2014; JP: September 25, 2014
- Genre: Puzzle-platform
- Mode: Single-player

Murasaki Baby is a 2014 puzzle-platform game developed by Ovosonico and published by Sony Computer Entertainment for the PlayStation Vita. The game was designed by Massimo Guarini who previously worked on Shadows of the Damned.

== Gameplay ==
The game's art direction follows the style of Edward Gorey. The titular character, known only as "Baby", is a young girl with an upside-down face. She carries a heart-shaped balloon, as do the other characters that Baby encounters throughout the adventure. Popping the other characters' balloons (via a tap on the Vita's touch screen) unlocks additional powers via different level backdrops. Up to three additional backdrops are unlocked on each level, and can be swapped at any time via a swipe of the Vita's rear touchpad. Many of the game's puzzles require quick shifting between various backdrops/powers in order to proceed.

The game world is a world populated by children's fantasies and fears. Using the Vita touch screen, the player must guide Baby through the world by "holding" her hand and guiding her throughout the game.

== Reception ==
Reception

Aggregate score
Aggregator	Score
Metacritic	69/100

Metacritic, a review aggregator, rated the game 69/100 based on 48 reviews. Hardcore Gamer rated it 4.5/5 and wrote, "Every Vita owner needs to experience Murasaki Baby. By creating a personal and engaging story, all while wrapping it in a hypnotically original art design, Ovosonico have gone where most other developers fear to tread." Eurogamer rated it 8/10 and wrote, "Yes, the touch controls sometimes work against it and, like Baby, the game occasionally stumbles over its own feet, but for the most part it walks the fine line between the weird and the wonderful with aplomb." IGN rated it 7.5/10 and wrote, "Filled with interesting ideas, Murasaki Baby's dazzling animation and unique approach to platforming are enticing. Moving Baby around with the spotty touch controls can be frustrating, but this short confection is sweet enough while it lasts." GameSpot rated it 7/10 and wrote, "Controlling Murasaki Baby can be tiresome, and your hands are too often covering the dazzling, shadowy vistas that provide such a distinctive personality. Still, this often-touching adventure is too great an audio-visual treat to discount." Game Informer rated it 6/10 and wrote, "Murasaki Baby is a weird little game about a weird little girl lost in a weird-looking world. Once you get past its Hot Topic aesthetic, it's a breezy puzzle game that's challenging in all the wrong ways."
