= Avantgarden =

Italian video game developer

Avantgarden S.r.l.
- Formerly: Ovosonico S.r.l. (2012–2020)
- Company type: Private
- Industry: Video games
- Founded: 2012; 14 years ago
- Founders: Massimo Guarini, Gianni Ricciardi
- Headquarters: Milan, Italy
- Key people: Rami Galante
- Products: Murasaki Baby, Last Day of June
- Number of employees: 20 (2020)
- Parent: Digital Bros (2020–present)
- Website: www.avantgardengames.com

Avantgarden S.r.l. (formerly Ovosonico S.r.l.) is an Italian video game developer based in Milan. It was founded in 2012 by industry veterans Massimo Guarini and Gianni Ricciardi, sold to Digital Bros in 2020.

== History ==
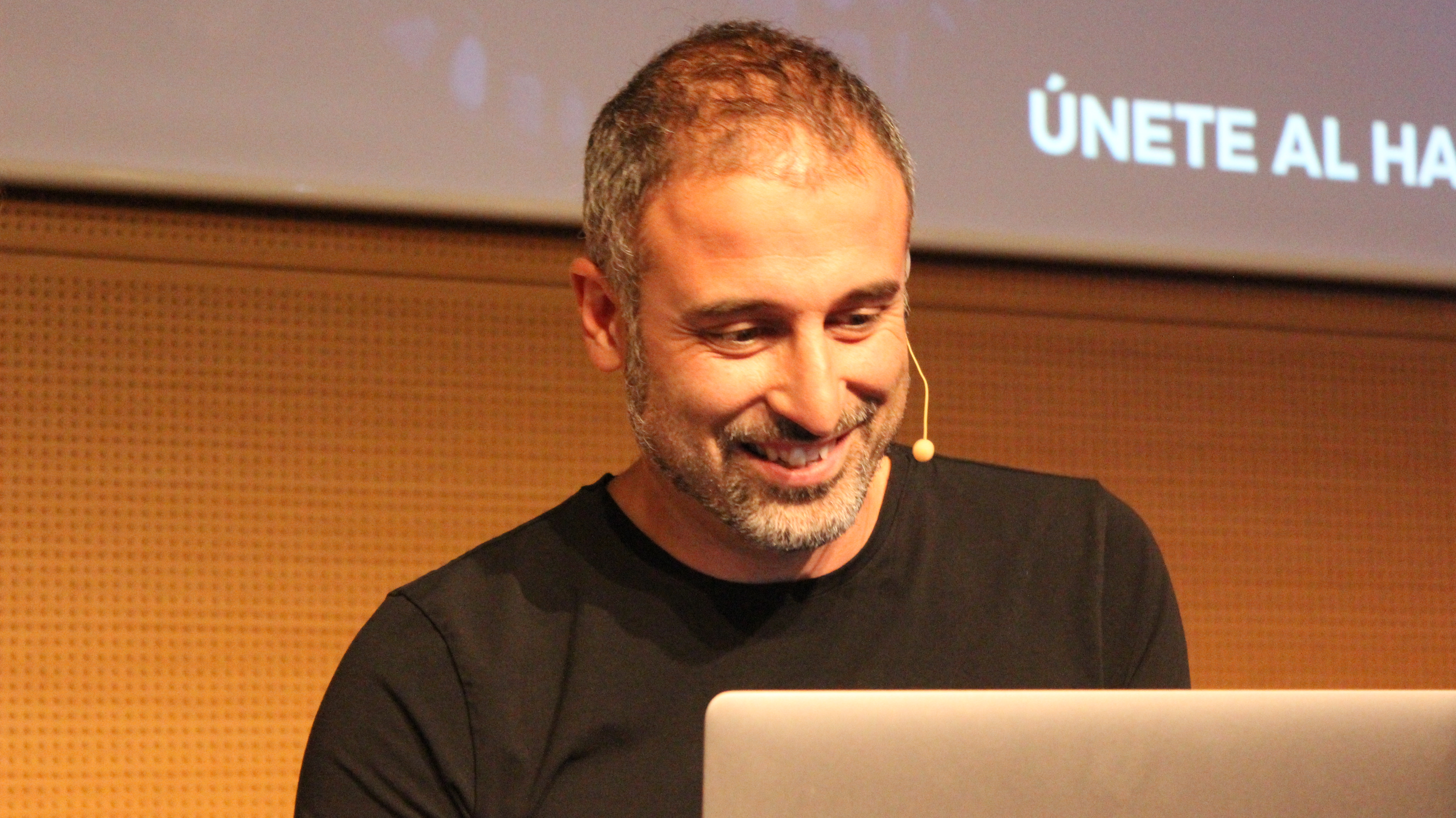
Founder Guarini in 2017

Before the establishment of the studio, Guarini was the director for Grasshopper Manufacture's Shadows of the Damned and Ubisoft's Naruto: Rise of a Ninja. He also has production credits in games for the Splinter Cell and Rainbow Six franchises. After the release of Shadows of the Damned, Guarini decided to move from Japan back to his home country and go independent. He wanted to do something different in life after being in the video game industry for over fifteen years. His approach towards video games is more about trying to connect with humans, not just gamers.

Back to Italy, Guarini reunites with his former colleague Gianni Ricciardi, music composer and audio director for ubisoft and other developers. The two founded Ovosonico in 2012, in a villa on Lake Varese.

In March 2013, Ovosonico announced a partnership with Sony Computer Entertainment Europe for the development of a new intellectual property, becoming the first Italian game studio to work with Sony. The game, Murasaki Baby, was announced at Sony's press conference during Gamescom 2013 for the PlayStation Vita. The game was released in North America and Europe in September 2014.

Digital Bros invested €1.44 million in Ovosonico in September 2015, acquiring all Ricciardi's shares and gaining a 49% stake in the company, while Ricciardi left the company to found his own game audio production studio WANT Musik. In 2018, Guarini relocated Ovosonico to Milan. Digital Bros bought the remainder in March 2020. Guarini subsequently left the company and retained the Ovosonico brand under his company Guarini Design S.r.l., while the Ovosonico studio was rebranded Avantgarden with its twenty employees now managed by Digital Bros' Abramo "Rami" Galante.

== Games developed ==
- Murasaki Baby (2014)
- Last Day of June (2017)
- Brothers: A Tale of Two Sons Remake (2024)
