= In Verbis Virtus =

2015 video game

- Developer: Indomitus Games
- Publisher: Indomitus Games
- Engine: Unreal Engine 3
- Platform: Windows
- Release: April 3, 2015
- Genres: Adventure, Puzzle
- Mode: Single-player

In Verbis Virtus is a downloadable adventure video game developed by the Italian video game developer Indomitus Games. It is early access for release on May 22, 2014, for Microsoft Windows. In Verbis Virtus is a first-person game where the player uses a microphone to cast spells by actually reciting the incantation. It mixes action and puzzle elements in a fantasy setting.

== Gameplay ==
While playing In Verbis Virtus, the player finds themselves completely unarmed in a dark dungeon with several dangers. The only way to overcome the obstacles is to learn magic through inscriptions that they find along their path. The magic formulas found, if pronounced correctly, enable the player to perform various spells. The spells are used to solve puzzles, overcome traps and kill enemies.

== Language ==
The developers created a fantasy language for the game called Maha'ki. The meaning of Maha'ki is "language of the gods", where "maha" means "creator deities" and "ki" means "voice, language".

== Reception ==
The game received little attention from the reviewing press so far. It was rated 80% by Multiplayer.it and 65% by Everyeye.it. Therefore, no Metacritic aggregate score is available to date.

== Trivia ==
Voice controlled spell casting is integrated using PocketSphinx speech recognition engine from CMUSphinx.
