= Pic Pic =

2007 video game

- Developer: Success
- Publisher: 505 Games
- Platform: Nintendo DS
- Release: JP: April 26, 2007; EU: February 8, 2008; AU: February 14, 2008
- Genre: Puzzle
- Mode: Single-player

Pic Pic, known in Japan as PikuPiku: Toku to E Ninaru Mitsu no Puzzle (ピクピク ～解くと絵になる３つのパズル～), is a puzzle video game by Success for the Nintendo DS. The game is divided into 3 different logic-based picture puzzle games: Maze Paint, Drawing and Magipic.

== Gameplay ==
Pic Pic contains three modes of play, the first and simplest is Maze Paint, in which players must connect an entrance to an exit using lines, which later reveal a complete picture on the top screen. In Magipic, the second mode of play, the players must turn gray tiles into a black tile according to numbers on the tiles. The last and most critically acclaimed mode of Pic Pic is Drawing in which users play on a grid with numbered white and black tiles. The players must draw lines between identical numbers without intersecting other lines, the line being as long as the number of tiles as the number on that particular tile. As in the other modes, completing the puzzle will create a picture.

== Reception ==
The game received high grades in the few publications it was reviewed in, receiving a remarkably high 94% average from GameRankings.

Eurogamer gave Pic Pic a perfect score, ten out of a possible ten, and summed up their review:

So what you have here is a puzzle [Drawing] as inspired and delightful as Slitherlink, and in a game as neatly executed as Hudson's classic. Then either side of it are two other puzzle games, the slightly less interesting Maze Paint, and the slightly more fiddly Magipic, like lovely bridesmaids either side of the gorgeous bride.
