= Word Realms =

2013 video game

- The Word Realms logo.
- Developer: Asymmetric Publications
- Publisher: Asymmetric Publications
- Designers: Zack "Jick" Johnson; Kevin Simmons
- Platforms: Linux, Mac OS, Microsoft Windows
- Release: 21 May 2013
- Genres: role-playing game, puzzle game
- Mode: Single-player

Word Realms (abbreviated WR) is a single-player role-playing game designed by Asymmetric Publications, including lead designer Zack "Jick" Johnson and designer Kevin Simmons. The game was released in 2013.

== Gameplay ==
Word Realms gameplay is based on battles between the player character and a computer-controlled non-player character (NPC). As in the game Bookworm Adventures by PopCap Games, battles consist of the player and the NPC taking turns spelling a word from a set of letters.

There are also eight mini-games. Each mini-game has a different gameplay mechanism, sometimes similar to battles, and sometimes with some twists or restrictions that make it quite different.

== Development ==
The game was developed over a period of four years, and was funded through Kickstarter.
