= Exit 2 =

2006 video game

- Developer(s): Taito
- Publisher(s): Taito
- Series: Exit
- Platform(s): PlayStation Portable, Xbox 360 (XBLA)
- Release: PlayStation Portable: JP: September 7, 2006; KO: September 22, 2006; EU: March 23, 2007; AU: May 19, 2007; Xbox Live Arcade: WW: February 25, 2009
- Genre(s): Puzzle-platform
- Mode(s): Single-player

Exit 2 (Kangaeru Exit (かんがえる いぐじっと, lit. "Thinking Exit") in Japan) is the sequel to the PlayStation Portable game Exit. It was released in Japan and Korea in 2006 and in Europe and Australia in 2007. A downloadable demo of the game was released in November 2006.

An Xbox Live Arcade (Xbox 360) version of the game was released on February 25, 2009.

== Reception ==
Reception

Aggregate score
Aggregator	Score	
Aggregator	PSP	Xbox 360
Metacritic	75/100	65/100

Review scores
Publication	Score	
Publication	PSP	Xbox 360
Edge	7/10	N/A
Famitsu	32/40	N/A
GameRevolution	N/A	B−
GameSpot	N/A	7.5/10
IGN	7.5/10	6.5/10
PlayStation Official Magazine – UK	(OPS2) 8/10; 7/10	N/A
Official Xbox Magazine (US)	N/A	6/10
PSM3	74%	N/A
TeamXbox	N/A	9/10

The PSP version received "generally favorable reviews", while the Xbox 360 version received "mixed or average reviews", according to video game review aggregator Metacritic. In Japan, Famitsu gave the PSP version a score of two eights, one seven, and one nine for a total of 32 out of 40.
