= Takedown: Red Sabre =

2013 video game

- Developer: Serellan
- Publisher: 505 Games
- Designer: Christian Allen
- Composer: Rich Douglas
- Engine: Unreal Engine 3
- Platforms: Microsoft Windows, Xbox 360
- Release: Windows: WW: September 20, 2013; Xbox 360: WW: February 21, 2014
- Genre: Tactical shooter
- Modes: Single-player, multiplayer

Takedown: Red Sabre is a tactical shooter video game developed by Serellan and published by 505 Games for Microsoft Windows and Xbox 360. It was released on September 20, 2013 for Windows via Steam and on February 21, 2014 for Xbox 360 via Xbox Live Arcade.

== Gameplay ==
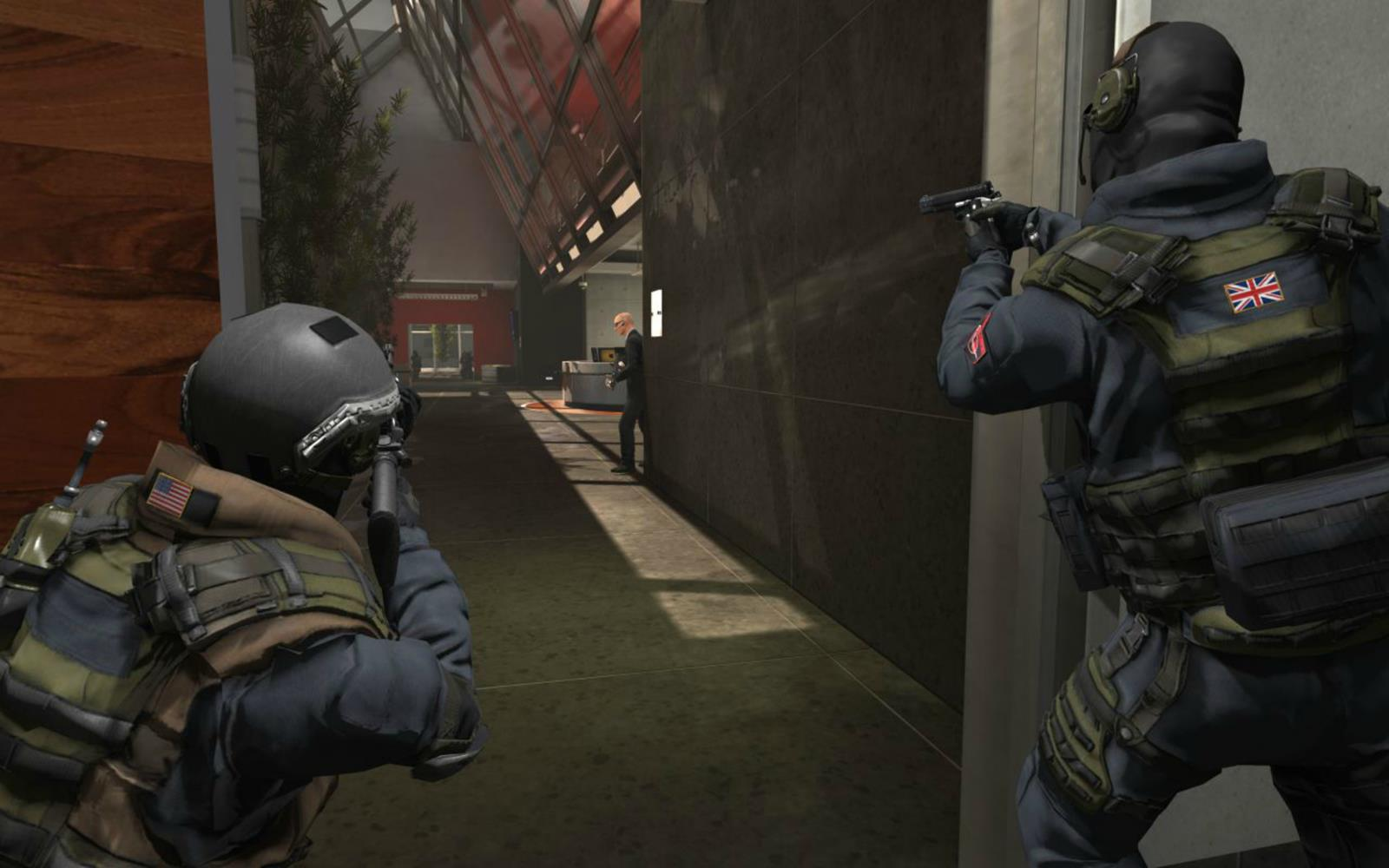
Screenshot of Takedown: Red Sabre from E3.

Takedown: Red Sabre is a first-person shooter and a tactical shooter, which aims to be a realistic squad-based shooter. It is considered by the developer to be a spiritual successor to the original Tom Clancy's Rainbow Six and SWAT series of games. It supports single player, co-operative play, and adversarial multiplayer gametypes.

== Development ==
=== Successful Kickstarter campaign ===
Following the success of other crowdfunding campaigns on Kickstarter, Serellan launched its own appeal on March 2, 2012 on the same website, with a $200,000 goal. This sum was a starting basis in order to bring the game into an alpha phase, so the project could be presented to publishers in a playable form, and to persuade private investors to show that the tactical shooter market is attractive and is still a viable industry. After a slow start (having only raised a third of the demanded sum one week before the deadline), the Kickstarter campaign gained momentum quickly on the final days following a revamping of the campaign and a cinematic video, and finally crossed the mark in the very last hours, ending at $221,833 in total pledges from 5,423 backers on April 1, 2012. One notable backer was the former community manager of Infinity Ward, Robert Bowling, who made the promotion of the campaign on Twitter. Every backer benefited from an access to a special forum section on the Serellan's website where they could participate into the game's development, by bringing ideas, participating to some decisions, and submitting content.

=== Partnership with 505 Games ===
On February 15, 2013, Serellan announced their partnership with the publisher 505 Games, and announced the release of the game for PC and Xbox 360 for the end of the year, and the PlayStation 3 version being available later. The game was then presented behind closed doors for the first time in playable form at the Electronic Entertainment Expo 2013, in the 505 Games booth.

== Reception ==
Takedown: Red Sabre

Aggregate score
Aggregator	Score
Metacritic	PC: 34/100

Review scores
Publication	Score
IGN	PC: 40/100
PC Gamer (UK)	PC: 49/100
GameSpot	PC: 20/100

Takedown received overwhelmingly negative reviews. Critics focused on its unfinished state, numerous bugs and glitches, and weak multiplayer offerings. Brett Todd of GameSpot gave it a 2 out of 10, concluding: "This is a game that should not have been released in its current state, and is certainly not one you should waste your time and money on."

Craig Owens, from PC Gamer, gave it a 49 out of 100, complained about the AI that "the AI just seems unaware what's happening around it" and also it received criticism because of "no map, no planning phase, no complex manoeuvres or abilities."

IGN's Brian Albert gave it a 4 out of 10. While he acknowledged the game's efforts towards realism, he noted that certain aspects missed the "bigger picture." he pointed out issues like "There's nothing natural about AI" and "squad members who can't communicate."

Michéal Murphy from GodisaGeek gave it a 2 out of 10, and described it as "a pure, unintelligible mess; broken, boring and just plain bad". he criticized the game's UI as "clunky" and called the game "terrible."
