= Energy Airforce Aim Strike! =

2003 video game

- Publisher(s): JP: Taito; EU: 505 Game Street
- Platform(s): PlayStation 2
- Release: JP: 2 October 2003; EU: 24 September 2004
- Genre(s): Simulation

Energy Airforce: Aim Strike! is a PlayStation 2 game that focuses on being an authentic flight simulator. All aircraft and weapons used in the game are either existing or prototypes used by the U.S. military. Realistic loads of weapons and fuel (although chaff and flares are unlimited) can be viewed from outside or from a realistic cockpit view. When flying the aircraft in cockpit view, the pilot's leg can be seen depressing appropriately.

== Plot ==
A small sandy desert country (whose capital is "Ad Barath") has a military coup d'état, resulting in a militarized dictatorship. The country uses its air superiority to invade a peaceful neighbor to the south. At this point, the player's organization steps in to combat the dictatorship and restore freedom to the besieged country. This involvement results in the city of "Ad Barath" falling in the final mission.

Unlike the previous game (Energy Airforce), in which the player was stated to be a mercenary and has a single wingman (but could have his single wingman fly a range of jets), Energy Airforce Aim Strike! allows the player a range of new wing-man options, including two or three wingmen in various missions of the game's campaign.
