= Triangle Service =

Japanese video game developer

- Company type: Kabushiki gaisha
- Industry: Video games
- Founded: October 17, 2002
- Headquarters: Japan
- Key people: Toshiaki Fujino (founder)
- Products: XII Stag, Trizeal
- Website: www.triangleservice.co.jp

Triangle Service is a small Japanese video game developer. They develop games in the shoot 'em up genre (known as STG in Japan). It was founded by programmer Toshiaki Fujino in 2002.

== History ==
Fujino had previously been a programmer of Konami Computer Entertainment Japan East and the defunct Japanese branch-office of Korean manufacturer Oriental Soft. Fujino began independent development in 2001 before founding his own studio in 2002, named Triangle Service.

== Games developed ==
=== Arcade Games ===
Game	Year	Hardware	Publisher(s)
XII Stag	2002	Taito G-NET	Triangle Service
Trizeal	2004	Sega NAOMI	Triangle Service
Shooting Love. 2007^{a}	2007	Sega NAOMI	Triangle Service
Pengo!	2010	Sega RingWide	Sega
Ga-Sen Love Plus Pengo!	2012	Sega RingEdge 2	Triangle Service
Tapping Skill Test	2019	Sega ALLS UX	Triangle Service

=== Console Games ===
Game	Year	System	Publisher(s)	JP	NA	EU
XII Stag	2002	PlayStation 2	Taito (JP); 505 Game Street (EU)	Yes	No	Yes
Trizeal	2005	Sega Dreamcast	Triangle Service	Yes	No	No
Shooting Love: Trizeal	2006	PlayStation 2	Datam Polystar	Yes	No	No
Shooting Love, 200X^{c}	2009 (JP); 2015 (NA & EU)	Xbox 360	Triangle Service	Yes	Yes^{b}	Yes^{b}
Shooting Love 10th Anniversary XIIZEAL & ΔZEAL^{c}	2013	Xbox 360	5pb.	Yes	No	No
Shooting Love. Collection^{c}	2014	Xbox 360	Triangle Service	Yes	No	No
Ga-Sen Love Plus Pengo!^{c}	2015	Xbox 360	Triangle Service	Yes	No	No
XIIZEAL	2015	PC	Degica	Yes	Yes	Yes
ΔZEAL	2015	PC	Degica	Yes	Yes	Yes
Shmups Skill Test	2016	PC	Degica	Yes	Yes	Yes
Minus Zero	2016	PC	Degica	Yes	Yes	Yes
TRIZEAL Remix	2016	PC	Degica	Yes	Yes	Yes
EXZEAL	2016	PC	Degica	Yes	Yes	Yes
GyroShooter	2018	PC	Triangle Service	Yes	Yes	Yes
Shooting Love. Trilogy	TBA	Xbox One	Triangle Service	Yes	TBA	TBA
Arcade Love Plus Pengo!^{c}	August 22, 2019	Nintendo Switch	mebius.	Yes	TBA	TBA

Notes

^a Contains Exzeal and Shmups Skill Test
^b Only available via Games on Demand
^c Compilation release
