= The Destiny of Zorro =

2008 video game

- Developer: Pronto Games
- Publisher: 505 Games
- Engine: Torque Game Engine
- Platform: Wii
- Release: EU: February 15, 2008; NA: May 5, 2009
- Genre: Action-adventure

The Destiny of Zorro is an action-adventure game featuring the character Zorro, developed by American studio Pronto Games for the Wii.

== Gameplay ==
The game is a third-person action game, with cut-to sections where the player uses the Wii Remote to execute certain moves. For instance, the Wii Remote's pointer is used to trace out Zorro's iconic slash marks to defeat enemies whenever certain conditions are fulfilled, or control Zorro's whip, where the player points at a potential snaring target or grappling point and presses the A Button to launch the whip, allowing Zorro to swing over gaps or pull down objects. Controller gestures are used in combat, where the Wii Remote is used for basic sword moves and the Nunchuk is used for dodging enemy attacks.

== Setting and music ==
This game takes place in the coast and desert landscape of Spanish California in the early 19th century, as the player takes the role of the hero Zorro. The game is described to have drawn "inspiration from the Mexican, Spanish and Native Southwest American cultures prevalent in California in the early 1800s", giving the player a number of plots to play through, such as taking on Calavera and his troops or a power-hungry mob boss, thwarting a plot to steal a great treasure, and facing off against a rebel army. The game's soundtrack, composed by Andrew Edlen of Harmonic Engineering, takes its inspiration from classical Spanish culture, consistent with the game's setting.

== Companion game ==
Zorro: Quest for Justice
- Developer: Beast Studios
- Publisher: 505 Games
- Platform: Nintendo DS
- Release: EU: September 4, 2009; NA: February 12, 2010
- Genre: Action-adventure

Many months after Destiny's release, 505 Games later released Zorro: Quest for Justice for the Nintendo DS. It shares the same box art as Destiny, but features a significantly different plot and a different combat system, in which Zorro can only fight one enemy at a time and fighting is done with buttons, as opposed to motion controls.

== See also ==
- List of Wii games
