= Duoyi Network =

Chinese video game company

- Industry: Video games
- Founded: 2006; 20 years ago
- Founder: Xu Bo (Chinese: 徐波)
- Headquarters: Guangzhou, China
- Products: Shenwu series, Dream World series, Gunfire Reborn

Duoyi Network (simplified Chinese: 多益网络; traditional Chinese: 多益網絡; pinyin: Duō Yì Wǎng Luò), or Duoyi Games, is a Chinese video game company headquartered in Guangzhou, Guangdong. Founded in 2006 by Xu Youzhen, the company is known for developing some of China's most acclaimed game franchises, including the Shenwu series and the Dream World series. Their most recent projects include the third generation of the Shenwu series Shenwu 3, the cross-platform game for the Dream World franchise Dream World 3D, the 3D MMORPG Eternal Magic, the mobile turn-based RPG Legion of Knights, the multiplayer sandplay SLG Circle of War, and the sandbox RPG Portal Knights.

In 2015, Duoyi reached a net profit of US$150 million with a 50% growth rate and ranked the 4th among Chinese game companies in iOS revenue. In 2016, the company kept the same level of performance and started IPO. Duoyi ranked 25th among the MIIT's 2017 Top 100 Chinese Internet Enterprises, and 4th among all game companies in China.

== History ==
Duoyi Network was founded by Xu Youzhen, one of China's most well-known game designers since the early 2000s. Before founding Duoyi Network, Xu was the main designer of Fantasy Westward Journey and responsible for the architecture of the core gameplay. He led the development of Dream World and Shenwu as the founder and president of Duoyi Network.

On September 24, 2007, Duoyi released its first PC title, Dream World, a 2D turn-based MMORPG. In 2008, Duoyi received the Gold Finger Award from the China Cultural Industry Association for the creation of Dream World.

In 2010, Duoyi released Dream Emperor, a strategy mini-client game, and Shenwu, a turn-based MMORPG based on the story line of Journey to the West.

In 2011, Duoyi launched Tank Force!, an action mobile game that hit No. 1 on the App Store Download Chart. In 2012, Duoyi ranked the 40th of "China's Top 100 Internet Companies" jointly released by the Internet Society of China and MIIT.

In 2015, Duoyi released Shenwu Mobile, which hit the first on App Store Grossing Chart in China and 9th globally. Shenwu Mobile remained a top 10 grossing app for over 80 consecutive weeks. Shenwu 2, a major expansion set for both Shenwu PC and Shenwu Mobile, was released on July 3, 2015. On March 19, 2016, Shenwu 2 received two Gold Finger Awards for Excellent Online Game and Excellent Mobile Game at the Chinese Game Industry Annual Conference. Shenwu 3, the second major expansion set for the Shenwu franchise, was released on December 24, 2017.

Dream World Mobile and Dream World 3D were released, respectively in June 2015 and July 2017. In December 2017, the Dream World franchise announced its 10th Anniversary Event.

Duoyi established a partnership with 505 Games for the exclusive right to operate Portal Knights, a survival action role-playing game, in China. Duoyi released Portal Knights in China on November 21, 2017.

In 2017, Duoyi Network ranked the 25th of "China's Top 100 Internet Companies", released by Internet Society of China and MIIT, and the 4th among game companies in China.

== Games ==
Title	Year	Platform(s)	Genre
Dream World	2007	PC	Turn-based MMORPG
Shenwu	2010	PC	Turn-based MMORPG
Dream Emperor	2010	PC	RPG, Strategy
Tank Force!	2011	Android, iOS	Action
Shenwu 2 Mobile	2014	Android, iOS	Turn-based MMORPG
Dream World 2	2014	PC	Turn-based MMORPG
Tank Force 2	2014	Android, iOS	Action
Shenwu Tactics	2014	PC	Turn-based strategy game
Dream World Mobile	2015	Android, iOS	Turn-based MMORPG
D10: Origin of Heroes	2016	PC	Multiplayer online battle arena
Eternal Magic	2017	PC	3D MMORPG
Dream World 3D	2017	Android, iOS	Turn-based MMORPG
Legion of Knights: Crystal Revelation	2017	Android, iOS	RPG, Simulation
Circle of War	2017	Android, iOS	Strategy
Portal Knights	2017	PC	Sandbox, RPG
Shenwu 3	2017	PC	Turn-based MMORPG
Shenwu 3 Mobile	2017	Android, iOS	Turn-based MMORPG
Gunfire Reborn	2021	PC	Roguelite, first-person shooter
Gunfire Reborn Mobile	2022	Android, iOS	Roguelite, first-person shooter

== Honors and awards ==
Title	Award	Presented by	Year
Shenwu 2	Best Online Game	Alibaba	2017
Shenwu 2	Most Influential Game	Toutiao	2017
Shenwu 2	Top 10 Most Popular Client Online Game	Chinese Game Industry Annual Conference	2016
Shenwu 2	Top 10 Most Popular Original Client Online Game	Chinese Game Industry Annual Conference	2016
Shenwu 2 Mobile	Top 10 Most Popular Mobile Game	Baidu	2017
Shenwu 2 Mobile	Top 5 Adapted Mobile Games	Baidu	2015
Shenwu 2 Mobile	The Most Popular Mobile Game	17173	2015
Dream World	Gold Finger Best Original Online Game	China Culture & Entertainment Industry Association	2008
Developer Awards	Duoyi Network - Red Herring Top 100 Aisa	Red Herring	2017
Developer Awards	Duoyi Network - Top 10 Online Game Developers	Chinese Game Industry Annual Conference	2016
Developer Awards	Tang Yilu (CEO) - Top Ten Influential Persons in Chinese Game Industry	Chinese Game Industry Annual Conference	2016
Developer Awards	Duoyi Network - 25th among China's Top 100 Internet Companies	MIIT	2017
