= Family Farm Seaside =

Mobile video game

- Developer: Century Games PTE.
- Publisher: Century Games PTE.
- Platforms: Facebook, Android, iOS
- Release: 20 March 2012
- Genre: Simulation
- Mode: Single-player

Family Farm Seaside is a 2012 farming simulation game developed and published by the Beijing-based video game company FunPlus and then sold to Century Games. The game released for free on both iOS and Android platforms on 20 March 2012.

The game has received a positive reception from the public, and according to CNET "it was ranked around 100 on Apple's list of highest grossing apps on the App Store, and around the 135th most downloaded free software, according to data compiled by App Annie". In 2014, Social Times also reported that "Family Farm Seaside has a DAU/MAU engagement of over 35 percent, compared to 18 percent for Farmville, and 20 percent for Farmville 2".

By June 2015, Family Farm Seaside had more than 60 million active users.

== Gameplay ==
Starting with a small farm near a beach, players need to take care of their farms through planting and harvesting crops, feeding animals, and constructing buildings and machines. In-game items may be sold for "Coins", a virtual currency.
