= Naval Assault: The Killing Tide =

2010 video game

- Developer: Artech Studios
- Publisher: 505 Games
- Platform: Xbox 360
- Release: WW: June 15, 2010
- Genre: Action
- Modes: Single-player, multiplayer

Naval Assault: The Killing Tide is a 2010 Xbox 360 game developed by Artech Studios and published by 505 Games.

== Plot ==
Set in an alternate history where the Soviet Union has surrendered to Nazi Germany, the missions follow a US Naval Special Ops team operating a submarine during World War II as they battle the Axis powers.

== Gameplay ==
The player controls a submarine in third-person and has the ability to sink deep into the water, just under the water, and rise above the water. The submarine is equipped with long range torpedoes and gun turrets. The player will come across enemy depth charges, aircraft, and submarines.

== Reception ==
Reception

Aggregate score
Aggregator	Score
Metacritic	40/100

Review score
Publication	Score
IGN	4.5/10

Naval Assault: The Killing Tide received generally mixed to negative reviews. IGN's Anthony Gallegos called it 'simple' and 'boring' and criticized the presentation, graphics, and lasting appeal of the game saying 'You'll play this for a few moments, realize it isn't as fun as you hoped, and likely never play it again.' He gave it a 4.5/10 which IGN rates as 'bad'. Metacritic gave it an overall score of 40/100.
