= Serellan =

American video game developer

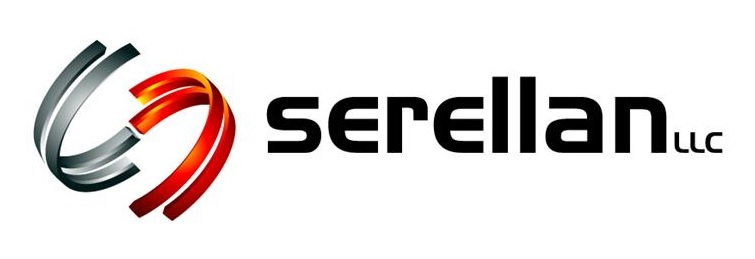
- Industry: Video games
- Founded: 2011
- Founder: Christian Allen
- Headquarters: Seattle, Washington, US
- Products: Takedown: Red Sabre; EPSILON
- Owner: Christian Allen
- Parent: Independent
- Website: www.serellan.com

Serellan LLC was an American video game developer founded in 2011 by Christian Allen. The company has released three video games, Takedown: Red Sabre for Microsoft Windows and Xbox Live Arcade. Their second title, EPSILON, released on Steam Early Access in 2015. Serellans final game Hotel Blind was released in April of 2016.

== History ==
Serellan was founded by Christian Allen in 2011. Prior to the company's establishment, Allen was lead designer for Ghost Recon: Advanced Warfighter and Halo: Reach.

In June 2012, after the closure of Zipper Interactive, former staff Mark Nicolino and Reed Gonsalves joined Serellan.

Serellan's first game was Takedown: Red Sabre. Originally titled as just Takedown, its development was financed through a crowdfunding campaign on Kickstarter. It reached its $200,000 goal on April 2, 2012, with the final tally being at $221,833. The game was released in 2013 for Microsoft Windows and in 2014 for Xbox 360. The Xbox 360 version was delayed due to not passing certification requirements.

Following Takedown: Red Sabre, EPSILON was promised to be free to anyone who had financed Takedown: Red Sabre on Kickstarter.

== Games ==
- Takedown: Red Sabre
- EPSILON
- Hotel Blind
