= Unturned =

2017 video game

- Steam artwork
- Developer: Smartly Dressed Games
- Publisher: 505 Games (Note: Published by Smartly Dressed Games on PC platforms)
- Designer: Nelson Sexton
- Engine: Unity
- Platforms: Windows, macOS, Linux, Xbox One, PlayStation 4, Nintendo Switch
- Release: Windows, macOS, Linux; July 7, 2017; Xbox One, PS4; November 12, 2020; Nintendo Switch; March 21, 2024
- Genre: Survival
- Modes: Single-player, multiplayer

Unturned is a free-to-play open world zombie survival sandbox game by Smartly Dressed Games, a studio consisting of Canadian game designer Nelson Sexton and a community administrator who goes by "MoltonMontro". It was released for Windows, macOS, and Linux in early access on July 7, 2014. The full game released three years later, on July 17, 2017. Unturned allows players to create custom maps using an in-game editor. Cosmetics and mods can also be created using the game's Unity engine, which allows them to publish creations on the Steam Workshop. A retail version of the game was released for the PlayStation 4 and Xbox One by 505 Games in November 2020. It was later ported to Nintendo Switch on March 21, 2024.

== Gameplay ==
Unturned features several different game modes, all with the same basic concept of zombie survival. The game also has multiple difficulty settings.

In the survival game mode, the player's character is spawned on a game map with clothes depending on their skill set. Players must find weapons and supplies to survive against the zombies. As the player progresses through the game, they gain experience points that can be used for upgrades or, on specific maps, as currency for trading. Survival mode is also available in multiplayer. The more significant aim is survival, but the players may work collaboratively or fight each other. Players must maintain their health, food, water, oxygen and radiation levels. Players can take radiation damage from zombie attacks, eating low quality food, or by entering "deadzones" without proper protective equipment. The multiplayer option has created a platform for various gameplay, such as survival, roleplay, creative, paintball, and battle royal matches. The game has a chance to give players cosmetic items, like clothing or special effects for their character, or "camouflage" or "skins" which can modify the appearance of players' weapons. Players can also purchase cosmetic items, loot boxes (keys and cases), and other items from the Steam Market.

There are several official maps based on real-world locations, including PEI (Prince Edward Island), Washington (the U.S. state), Yukon (the Canadian Territory), Russia, and Germany.

The game supports using the Steam Workshop to add custom items, vehicles, armor, and weapons to enhance or change the basic experience. Many popular user-created maps are curated, and many custom skins for items in the base game are added with updates. The game supports mods and the game's files were made source-available on the 7th of July 2026, marking the game's 9-year anniversary. It is not distributed under an open-source licence.

Arena game mode is for multiplayer only. Players are spawned in the middle of a map with supplies and weapons scattered around. The winner is the last person, or the last team, alive. Players may die due to being slain by other players or crossing the map's boundaries. The game will also spawn helpful items like armor, attachments for guns, and the three types of health items. These items are essential, as the game has an intense bleeding out mechanic that can finish a player without medical supplies. The game will also spawn vehicles, enabling players to avoid the border or roadkill other players. The arena mode grants a massive advantage to teams in arena mode. Since there are no separate solo/squad modes, solo players will be up against teams that can aid each other. The game does not require teams to fight each other so that multiple players can win.

== Plot ==
The game's story is can be found in written notes and environmental storytelling spread out across all of its official maps.

On the Washington map there is a lab belonging to a company known as Scorpion-7. Outside the lab, there is an overrun military unit. In the basement of the lab, there are canisters containing zombies in stasis, and one of the canisters is broken. Also in the building there is an apology note, and the implication is that the writer was attacked before the note was completed. The Scorpion-7 lab is assumed to be ground zero for the start of the zombie outbreak, and while the exact origin and the cause of the outbreak remain vague, it is heavily implied that the virus was inadvertently created through the company's bioweapons research when a test subject escaped from their containment.

The player is introduced as one of the few survivors of the outbreak, alluding to the idea that the player has not "turned" into a zombie. The player has the option of helping the Coalition, an organization fighting the outbreak and locating survivors.

Sexton has built more lore for the world over the years. Some plot points revolve around real-world historical elements such as prehistoric Russia and the Roswell incident.

== Development ==
Unturned was developed by Nelson Sexton, an indie game developer from Calgary, Canada. He was sixteen at the time of Unturned's first release. Sexton has been developing games since he was nine. His first games, Battlefield and Deadzone, were created in Roblox and became two of the most popular games on the platform at the time. Deadzone was a zombie-survival game similar to Unturned. Neither of Nelson's original Roblox games are still on Roblox, as they were both made private due to security issues, which resulted in Roblox being flooded with copies of both games.

Unturned was originally listed in May 2014 as "Unturned 2.0" on Steam Greenlight, Steam's early access platform. The game was officially released on July 7, 2017. Sexton has discussed plans to create a sequel to the game named Unturned II using Unreal Engine, and a new version of Unturned was released for limited demos, but development of the sequel has since been put on hold and is not expected to resume. Instead, the game has continued to be updated with new content and bug fixes.

== Reception and community ==
According to gaming website Kotaku, Unturned was one of Steam's most popular games in mid-2014. Both Kotaku and Rock, Paper, Shotgun characterized the game's popularity as unexpected, since the game is mainly developed by a single person without a major studio's resources. PC Gamer said that while Unturned had "few real ideas on its own", it was a "simple, accessible survival-simulator" that players may enjoy provided they could "stomach the low production values". In 2017, it was in the top 10 most played games on Steam, having rarely ever fallen lower in the rankings since the week of its early access release. By January 2023 the game broke its peak lifetime player count record with 112,648 concurrent players. As of October 2025, 90% of all Steam reviews of the game are positive.

Reviewers have compared Unturned to games like 7 Days to Die, DayZ, Minecraft, Project Zomboid, and Rust.

Unturned is known for its very vocal and passionate community. Fans interact on the game's community board on Steam, Reddit, and the now defunct official forum, called the SDG Forum. Sexton frequently interacts with the community, and around 2019 he brought Tyler "MoltonMontro", an active long-time community member, into Smartly Dressed Games in an official capacity. Many game updates are partly, or fully, developed by the community, the most notable of which are curated maps. Curated maps are high quality, hand-picked, community led projects integrated into the game via the steam workshop, all but two are PC exclusive, with the notable exception of the Hawaii and Elver maps. There is also an Unturned community on YouTube which is sometimes cited as a major reason the game became popular. Notable YouTubers who have made videos about the game include PewDiePie, Jacksepticeye, DanTDM, and Ruben Sim (who played it as an alternative to Roblox after he was permanently banned by the Roblox Corporation).
