= Battleloot Adventure =

2012 video game

- App icon on iTunes
- Publisher: Digital Tales
- Platforms: iOS, Android, Windows Phone
- Release: March 2012
- Genres: tactical role-playing, single-player video game

Battleloot Adventure is a fantasy-themed tactical role-playing single-player video game for iOS, Android and Windows Phone devices, published in March 2012 by the Italian developer Digital Tales.

== Gameplay ==
The player controls a party of three adventurers in turn-based battles against small groups of opponents. Battles are selected from an overhead map. As there is no manoeuvering, tactics are limited to selecting which opponent to attack with which character; players can also conduct combo attacks or use items. The cartoonish characters and enemies, which include zombie sheep, are assigned one of four classes, whose capabilities relate to each other according to a rock-paper-scissors mechanic: sages (green) beat rogues (red), who beat warriors (blue), who beat mages (purple), who in turn beat sages. Successful battles are rewarded with gold, which is used to buy equipment or skills for the characters; gold can also be purchased for real money.

== Reception ==
By the end of March 2012, the game held a Metacritic score of 79 out of 100, indicating "generally favorable" reviews. Touch Arcade appreciated the complex but not overwhelming tactical system and well-implemented in-app purchases, while 148Apps praised it as "cheap, addictive, nice to look at, and quite a bit of fun". Gamezebo criticized the generic setting, lack of story, uneven difficulty and number of bugs.
