= How to Survive =

2013 video game

- Developer: Eko Software
- Publisher: 505 Games
- Director: Chris Shalendra
- Platforms: Microsoft Windows, PlayStation 3, PlayStation 4, Xbox 360, Xbox One, Wii U
- Release: Windows, Xbox Live Arcade; October 23, 2013; PlayStation 3: NA: November 5, 2013; PAL: November 6, 2013; Wii U: EU: June 5, 2014; NA: June 19, 2014; PlayStation 4, Xbox One: WW: October 29, 2014; NA: November 11, 2014 (PS4)
- Modes: Single-player, multiplayer

How to Survive is a video game developed by French studio Eko Software and published by 505 Games. It was released in 2013 for Xbox 360, Microsoft Windows, and PlayStation 3; in June 2014 for Wii U's Nintendo eShop; and in 2014 for PlayStation 4 and Xbox One as How to Survive: Storm Warning Edition.

== Gameplay ==
How to Survive is played from a top-down perspective. There are two game modes, story and challenge, and both can be played with up to two players. Challenge mode puts the player(s) on one side of the island, and they must get to the other side, where their getaway vehicle awaits. The player's mission is to gather materials, craft weapons, and make it off the island without dying. Neither challenge or story are timed, and therefore, the player can take as long as they want.

== Plot ==
Players play as one of three survivors - the all rounded Kenji, the fast, arczar Abbie or the brawling Jack - shipwrecked on one of four zombie-infested islands that form an archipelago. After finding food for another wounded survivor, Andrew (who has already suffered a zombie bite), the survivor meets a one-legged old man named Ramon who owns a boat that can be used to travel between the islands. Together, they hatch a plan to escape the archipelago using a beached seaplane, with Andrew as the pilot. Ramon sends the survivor to fetch materials to repair the plane.

The survivor soon meets Kovac, a mysterious man in full armor who has made the islands his personal hunting ground. A self-proclaimed master survivor, Kovac is using his extensive field experience to write a zombie survival guide ('Kovac's Rules'), and gladly assumes a mentor role, helping the survivor with valuable advice and tools throughout the course of the game.

On the search, the survivor meets a woman named Carol whose young daughter, Emily, got separated from her. The survivor locates Emily, stranded on a cliffside, but is unable to save her from falling into the sea and getting swept away; Carol is devastated by the news. The plane is repaired, but Ramon realizes Andrew is (obviously) in no condition to pilot it and sends the survivor in search of someone who can.

The survivor meets a senile old woman, Martha, who is missing her companion Enzo (who turns out to be a cat). After retrieving Enzo, the survivor learns from her of a drunken former airplane pilot named Sanchez who lives nearby. Sanchez turns out to be a drug smuggler who lost all his cargo when his plane crashed, and the survivor is forced to comb the entire archipelago for his scattered packages to secure his cooperation.

Along the way, the survivor finds Emily alive, but imprisoned, and frees her, reuniting her with Carol. The girl claims she was taken prisoner by a strange man whose face she never saw; her testimony, added to Carol's accusation of the same man being responsible for guiding the ship she was on onto the reefs, makes it evident that Kovac is not all he seems after all.

The survivor eventually gathers Sanchez, Carol, and Emily by the repaired seaplane. Sanchez wants to leave at once, but the survivor insists they fetch Ramon as well. However, not far from the plane the survivor is instead confronted by Kovac, who shows his true colors, claiming he does not want the survivor to leave as they have 'not finished their training'. He then sets the survivor a 'final exam' by attracting a massive zombie horde, which will have to be fought off while the plane starts up. Finally, after a grueling battle, the survivor manages to escape back to the plane, and it takes off with Kovac calling through a loudspeaker for the survivor to 'come back'.

The game ends with Kovac causing another shipwreck by misguiding a ship over the radio, just as he did with the player's in the beginning. He then calls an accomplice, stating that a "new shipment of recruits" has arrived, and the accomplice answers with "Copy, amigo. I'm in position. Ready to play another round?" It is then seen that the accomplice is none other than the old cripple, Ramon.

== Reception ==
Reception

Aggregate score
Aggregator	Score
Metacritic	(XOne) 71/100 (PS4) 65/100 (PS3) 61/100 (PC) 60/100 (X360) 59/100 (Wii U) 55/100

Review scores
Publication	Score
Famitsu	(PS4) 31/40
GameSpot	7/10
Hardcore Gamer	(X360) 3/5
IGN	5.4/10
Nintendo Life	(Wii U) 5/10
Official Nintendo Magazine	(Wii U) 60%
PlayStation Official Magazine – Australia	(PS4) 55%
PlayStation Official Magazine – UK	(PS3) 4/10
Official Xbox Magazine (US)	(X360) 6/10
PC PowerPlay	(PC) 5/10
The Digital Fix	(X360) 5/10
Metro	(X360) 3/10

How to Survive and its Storm Warning Edition received "mixed or average reviews" on all platforms, though the latter title was a bit better received than the former, according to the review aggregation website Metacritic. In Japan, where the Xbox 360 version was ported for release on October 23, 2013, followed by the PlayStation 3 version, which was published by Spike Chunsoft under the name How to Survive: Zombie Island (HOW TO SURVIVE ゾンビアイランド, HOW TO SURVIVE Zonbi Airando) on March 4, 2014; and the PlayStation 4 version (also published by Spkie Chunsoft under the name How to Survive: Zombie Island - Storm Warning Edition (HOW TO SURVIVE ゾンビアイランド ストームワーニングエディション, HOW TO SURVIVE Zonbi Airando Sutōmu Wāningu Edishon)) on April 8, 2015, Famitsu gave the latter console version a score of 31 out of 40.

== Sequel ==
How To Survive - Third Person Standalone was announced on June 4, 2015. It is an expansion pack in which players play the game in a third-person perspective, as opposed to the top-down perspective of the original How to Survive. A sequel, How to Survive 2, was announced on August 28, 2015. It features enhanced graphics and an expanded home base camp and crafting system. It was set in New Orleans and it was released on Steam's early access in October 2015.
