= XII Stag =

2002 video game

- Developers: Triangle Service (Arcade); Dreams (PS2)
- Publishers: JP: Taito (arcade, PS2); EU: 505 Game Street (PS2)
- Engine: LightWave
- Platforms: Arcade, PlayStation 2
- Release: JP: 2002 (arcade); JP: 20 March 2003 (PS2); EU: 2 April 2004 (PS2)
- Genre: Shoot 'em up
- Modes: Single player, Multiplayer
- Arcade system: Taito G-NET

XII Stag (pronounced Twelve Stag), is a shoot 'em up arcade video game developed by Triangle Service and published by Taito. Originally released for the Taito G-NET arcade board, and later ported to the PlayStation 2, Xbox 360, and PC.

Digital Bros published the port in Europe; however, the game was not released in the USA.

== Gameplay ==
=== Attacks ===
- Normal shot: Press A. There are 5 shot levels.
- Barrier: Press B. Consumes 1 bomb.
- Side attack LEVEL1: Tap horizontal direction once, then opposite direction.
- Side attack LEVEL2: right, left, left or left, right, right
- Back fire attack: When enemy is close to the rear of player's fighter, enemy is automatically damaged.

=== Multiplier system ===
When enemy is destroyed by Side attack or Back fire attack, the current score multiplier increases by 1, up to 12. The multiplier decreases by 1 at a time when enemy is not destroyed by either attack for a prolonged time period.

== Releases ==
=== XIIstag Limited ===
XIISTAG LIMITED
- Developer: Triangle Service
- Publisher: Triangle Service
- Engine: LightWave
- Platform: Windows 95
- Release: 2005-?
- Genre: Shoot 'em up
- Modes: Single player, Multiplayer

It is a 1-stage demo of the game that includes Stage 4 of the original game. Full-screen and windowed executables are included. Unlike the original, the objects are 3d objects rendered in software.

=== XIIZEAL ===
XIIZEAL
- Developer: Eurosoft
- Publisher: Eurosoft: JP: Triangle Service
- Engine: LightWave
- Platforms: Windows Mobile, Steam
- Release: 2007-?: JP: 28 December 2006; WW: 5 June 2015
- Genre: Shoot 'em up
- Modes: Single player, Multiplayer

XIIZEAL is a port of XII Stag released in 2007 for the Windows Mobile platform. It includes 5 difficulty settings from very easy to very hard, as well as the original soundtrack. This version was later released for Steam in 2015.

=== Shooting Love. 10 shuunen ~XIIZEAL & ΔZEAL~ ===
シューティングラブ。１０周年 ～XIIZEAL & ΔZEAL～
- Developer: Triangle Service
- Publisher: JP: Triangle Service
- Platforms: PC, Xbox 360
- Release: 2013-05-30
- Genre: Shoot 'em up
- Modes: Single player, Multiplayer

The Xbox 360 version is a compilation version that includes XIIZeal and ΔZEAL.

DeltaZeal was originally released as G-Stream G2020 by Oriental Soft, which was developed by future Triangle Service programmer and founder Toshiaki Fujino.
