= We Rock: Drum King =

2009 video game

- Developer: DEL
- Publisher: 505 Games
- Platform: Wii
- Release: EU: April 9, 2009; NA: May 26, 2009
- Genre: Music
- Modes: Single player, multiplayer

We Rock: Drum King is a music video game developed by DEL and published by 505 Games for the Wii. For its release in the United States, the game was co-branded by rock music magazine Rolling Stone, and titled Rolling Stone: Drum King.

== Gameplay ==
The game simulates the playing of drums with players either using the Wii Remote and Nunchuk or two Wii Remotes for control. Following a scrolling runway similar to music games such as Guitar Hero, players gesture their appropriate controller in time to the music and prompts that appear on screen.

== Soundtrack ==
All songs in the game are cover versions.

- "All Star" - Smash Mouth
- "Banquet" - Bloc Party
- "Be My Baby" - The Ronettes
- "Blister in the Sun" - Violent Femmes
- "Born to Be Wild" - Steppenwolf
- "By the Way" - Offcutts
- "Can't Get Enough" - Bad Company
- "Can't Stand Losing You" - The Police
- "Cissy Strut (instrumental)" - The Meters
- "Click Click Boom" - Saliva
- "Direction" - The Starting Line
- "Feel Good Inc." - Gorillaz
- "Fight the Good Fight" - Triumph
- "I Fought the Law" - The Clash
- "In Too Deep" - Sum 41
- "Let There Be Drums" - The Ventures
- "Lifestyles of the Rich & Famous" - Good Charlotte
- "Mickey" - Toni Basil
- "No One Knows" - Queens of the Stone Age
- "On Top of the World" - Boys Like Girls
- "Pull Me Under" - Dream Theater
- "Saturday Superhouse" - Biffy Clyro
- "She Sells Sanctuary" - The Cult
- "Song 2" - Blur
- "Spoonman" - Soundgarden
- "Stay With Me" - Faces
- "The Take Over, the Breaks Over" - Fall Out Boy
- "The Final Countdown" - Europe
- "We Will Rock You" - Queen

== Reception ==
We Rock: Drum King received negative reviews from critics. On Metacritic, the game holds a score of 32/100 based on 4 reviews. Mark Bozon of IGN rated the game a 3/10, criticizing the game's use of cover songs and unintuitive controls.
