= Brothers: A Tale of Two Sons =

2013 video game

- Developer: Starbreeze Studios (Note: The remake was developed by Avantgarden.)
- Publisher: 505 Games
- Director: Josef Fares
- Producers: Mikael Nermark; Kristoffer Kindh
- Designer: Filip Coulianos
- Programmer: Carl Granberg
- Artist: Claes Engdal
- Composer: Gustaf Grefberg
- Engine: Unreal Engine 3 (Note: The remake uses Unreal Engine 5.)
- Platforms: Xbox 360; PlayStation 3; Windows; PlayStation 4; Xbox One; iOS; Android; Windows Phone; Nintendo Switch; PlayStation 5; Xbox Series X/S
- Release: 7 August 2013: Xbox 360; 7 August 2013; PlayStation 3, Windows; 3 September 2013; PlayStation 4, Xbox One; 12 August 2015; iOS; 22 October 2015; Android, Windows Phone; 26 May 2016; Nintendo Switch; 28 May 2019; Amazon Luna; 20 October 2020; PS5, Xbox Series X/S; 28 February 2024
- Genre: Adventure
- Modes: Single-player, multiplayer

Brothers: A Tale of Two Sons is a 2013 adventure game developed by Starbreeze Studios and published by 505 Games for Xbox 360, Microsoft Windows, PlayStation 3, PlayStation 4, Xbox One, iOS, Android, Windows Phone, Nintendo Switch, and Amazon Luna. The narrative takes place in a fantasy world filled with fictitious creatures such as orcs and trolls, where two young brothers set out on a journey to find a cure for their father's illness. The game is often mentioned as an example of artistry in video games due to its heavy narrative. It received positive reviews from critics and had sold over 800,000 units by January 2015.

== Gameplay ==
Brothers: A Tale of Two Sons is presented from a third-person view overlooking the two brothers. The brothers are moved individually by two thumbsticks on the controller. The controller triggers cause the respective brother to interact with the game world, such as talking to a non-player character or grabbing onto a ledge or object. The older brother is the stronger of the two and can pull levers or boost his younger brother to higher spaces, while the younger one can pass between narrow bars. The player progresses by manipulating the two brothers at the same time to complete various puzzles, often requiring the player to manipulate both brothers to perform differing functions (such as one distracting a hostile non-player character while the other makes his way around). Should either brother fall from a great height or get injured, the game restarts at a recent checkpoint. All of the in-game dialogue is spoken in a fictional language based on Lebanese Arabic, thus the story is conveyed through actions, gestures and expressions.

== Plot ==
The story begins with a boy named Naiee standing at the tombstone of his dead mother who drowned at sea while he was unable to save her. After the ghost of his mother comforts him, his older brother, Naia, calls him to help their ill father reach the village's doctor who, in turn, tells them the only way to save him is by collecting the water from the Tree of Life. The brothers embark on their journey through the village, hills and mountains while facing challenges such as the local bully, a farmer's aggressive dog, and deadly wolves. They help others along the way – reuniting a troll couple, saving a man attempting suicide, and aiding an inventor.

The brothers eventually encounter a savage group of tribesmen and save a young girl from being sacrificed. While assisting the brothers on their journey, the girl begins seducing Naia, much to Naiee's dismay, and tricks them into entering a cave. Once inside, she reveals herself as a monstrous spider creature who tries to eat the brothers, but they manage to thwart and kill her by pulling off her legs, but not before she mortally wounds Naia. Nearing the end of their journey, the brothers reach the Tree of Life; Naia insists that Naiee venture on to reach the top of the tree. Naiee collects the Water of Life but, as he returns to the bottom, he finds that Naia has already died from his wound. Unable to revive him using the water, Naiee buries and grieves for his older brother before returning to the village.

Upon reaching the shoreline, Naiee must face his inability to swim in order to get the waters to his dying father. His mother's spirit appears to comfort and motivate him and, with Naia's spiritual guidance, Naiee is able to force himself to swim to the village. He is able to give the doctor the water, and the father recovers from his illness overnight. A short time afterwards, Naiee and his father mourn at the tombstones of both the mother and Naia.

== Development ==
Brothers: A Tale of Two Sons was developed by Starbreeze Studios and was the first game to come from the publishing partnership with 505 Games. During development, its working title was P13. The game uses Unreal Engine 3, and was developed in collaboration with Swedish-Lebanese award-winning film director Josef Fares.

Starbreeze sold the Brothers: A Tale of Two Sons intellectual property to 505 Games for $500,000 in January 2015. 505 Games continued developing the game for additional platforms, including the PlayStation 4 and Xbox One released in mid-2015, with director's commentary, the soundtrack, and a concept art gallery. Mobile versions of the game were also released; the iOS version was released on 22 October, while the Android version of the game was released on 26 May 2016.

505 Games developed a version for the Nintendo Switch released on 28 May 2019. This version includes a special two-player co-operative mode where each player controls one of the two brothers in the game. The game was released for Amazon Luna on 20 October 2020. Super Rare Games announced a limited physical release of the Switch version, which was made available on 25 March 2021.

== Reception ==
=== Critical response ===
Reception

Aggregate score
Aggregator	Score
Metacritic	PC: 90/100; X360: 86/100; PS3: 85/100; XONE: 81/100; PS4: 81/100 iOS: 81/100; NS: 79/100

Review scores
Publication	Score
IGN	8.2/10
Joystiq	5/5
TouchArcade	iOS: 4/5

Brothers: A Tale of Two Sons received "generally favorable" reviews from critics, while the PC version received "universal acclaim", according to review aggregator website Metacritic.

IGN said that Brothers: A Tale of Two Sons "might be the best downloadable title since Journey". GamesMaster's James Nouch said his preview of the game that "[Brothers: A Tale of Two Sons] is a charming, emotive adventure that flows at its own rather sedate pace", but in their final review GamesMaster gave it 91/100, writing: "Short but immensely satisfying, it's Ico meets Limbo in Fable's world. In a word: spellbinding". Edge gave it a 7/10 in its review. It praised the visual style, pace and story, as well as the controls, saying that the control scheme "understands what it means to communicate meaning through interaction". UK's GamesTM magazine gave Brothers: A Tale of Two Sons a score of 8/10 in its review in issue 137.

Joystiq gave the game a perfect score of 5/5. Joystiq's Ludwig Kietzmann says: "It's rare for a game to forge a connection so strong, and even rarer for you to become the connective tissue". Official Xbox Magazine UK praised the game and its touching story and inventive controls. They gave it a score of 9/10.

Both IGN and PC Gamer stated Brothers: A Tale of Two Sons was one of the best games of 2013. IGN states this with "it's no secret that we love Journey. It was our Game of the Year for 2012, after all. And we quite love Fable too [...]. So to combine the two into one cinematic, story-driven experience – one written and directed by a decorated Swedish filmmaker – meant our interest was piqued. And after we saw the game, we knew: this is going to be good. Really, really good". PC Gamer said "this could easily shape up to be one of the indie darlings of 2013". The game won the "Best Innovation" award while nominated for "Best Family Game" and "Best Story" at the 2014 BAFTA Video Games Awards.

=== Sales ===
Brothers: A Tale of Two Sons had sold over 800,000 units by January 2015.

=== Awards ===
Brothers: A Tale of Two Sons won the award for Best Xbox Game at the 2013 VGX Award Show (formerly Spike Video Game Awards; VGAs), in competition with Grand Theft Auto V, BioShock Infinite, and Tomb Raider. It also won the Best Game Innovation Award at 2014's British Academy Games Awards (BAFTA). During the 17th Annual D.I.C.E. Awards, the Academy of Interactive Arts & Sciences awarded Brothers with "Downloadable Game of the Year", along with a nomination for "Outstanding Achievement in Game Direction".

== Remake ==
A remake of the game was announced at The Game Awards in December 2023. Developed by Italian studio Avantgarden, it was released for PlayStation 5, Windows, and Xbox Series X/S on 28 February 2024.
