= List of D3 Publisher video games =

This is a list of games published by D3 Publisher, a subsidiary of Bandai Namco Entertainment. The page is split between titles published by the Japanese branch and those commissioned and/or published by the North American/European branch.

== Video games ==
=== Japan ===
- Abyss of the Sacrifice (PSP)
- Bae Yong-joon to Manabu Kankokugo DS (DS)
- Bae Yong-joon to Manabu Kankokugo DS Date Hen (DS)
- Bae Yong-joon to Manabu Kankokugo DS Test Hen (DS)
- Bangai-O HD: Missile Fury (XB360 (XBLA))
- BioShock 2 (Published in Japan) (PS3, XB360)
- Break 'Em All (DS)
- Bullet Girls (PS Vita)
- Bullet Girls 2 (PS Vita)
- Chicken Little (PS2, GC, GBA) (Japan only)
- Dark Sector (PS3, XB360, Windows)
- Dead Head Fred (PSP)
- Dragon Blade: Wrath of Fire (Wii)
- Dream Club (XB360, PSP)
- Dream Club Zero (XB360, PS Vita)
- Dream Club GoGo (PS3)
- Earth Defense Force (PS2)
- Earth Defense Force 2 (PS2)
- Earth Defense Force 2 Portable (PSP)
- Earth Defense Force 2 Portable V2 (PS Vita)
- Earth Defense Force 3 (XB360)
- Earth Defense Force 3 Portable (PS Vita)
- Earth Defense Force 4 (PS3, XB360)
- Earth Defense Force 4.1: The Shadow of New Despair (PS4, Windows)
- Earth Defense Force 5 (PS4)
- Earth Defense Force: Insect Armageddon (PS3, XB360, Windows)
- Earth Defense Force: Iron Rain (PS4)
- Earth Defense Force Tactics (PS2)
- Eat Lead: The Return of Matt Hazard (PS3, XB360)
- Fuyu no Sonata DS (DS)
- Machiing Maker (series) (PS2, PSP, DS, PS3, XB360)
- Maglam Lord (PS4, Switch)
- Natsuiro High School: Seishun Hakusho (PS3, PS4)
- Neon Genesis Evangelion (Pachinko series) (PS2, DS, PSP)
- Omega Labyrinth (PS Vita)
- OneChanbara: Bikini Samurai Squad (XB360)
- OneChanbara: Bikini Zombie Slayers (Wii)
- Onnanoko to Misshitsu ni Itara OO Shichau Kamo Shirenai. (3DS)
- School Girl/Zombie Hunter (PS4)
- Simple series (PS, PS2, PSP, PS3 (PSN), DC, GBA, DS, Wii, 3DS)
- Snowboard Racer 2 (PS2)
- Ten (PS2)
- The Chronicles of Narnia: The Lion, the Witch and the Wardrobe (PS2 & DS) (Japan only)
- The OneChanbara series (PS2, PS4, XB360, Wii, Windows, PSP)
- YEAH! YOU WANT "THOSE GAMES," RIGHT? SO HERE YOU GO! NOW, LET'S SEE YOU CLEAR THEM! (Switch, Windows, PS4, PS5)

==== Otome games ====
- Bakumatsu Renka (series) (PS2, PSP, DS)
- Dear My Sun!!: Musuko Ikusei Kyousoukyoku (PS2)
- Forbidden Romance (series) (Android, iOS, Windows, Switch)
- Hoshizora no Comic Garden (DS)
- Houkago no Love Beat (PS2)
- Kurayami no Hate de Kimi wo Matsu (DS)
- Last Escort (series) (PS2, PSP)
- Little Anchor (PS2)
- Mermaid Prism (PS2)
- Ore no Shita de Agake (BL game) (PS2)
- Reijou Tantei Office Love Jikenbo (PS2)
- Saikin Koi Shiteru? (DS)
- Signal (DS)
- Storm Lover (PSP)
- Storm Lover: Natsukoi!! (PSP)
- Suto*Mani: Strobe*Mania (PSP)
- Teikoku Kaigun Koibojou ~Meiji Yokosuka Koushinkyoku~ (PSV)
- The Charming Empire (Android, iOS, Windows, PSV, Switch)
- Vampire Knight DS (DS)
- Vitamin (video game series) (PS2, DS, PSP, 3DS, Vita)
- Nightshade/Hyakka Hyakurou (PSV, Windows, Switch)

=== North America and Europe ===
This section lists the games commissioned or acquired by the North American and European branches.

Year	Title	Developer(s)	Platform(s)
2005	Cabbage Patch Kids: Where's My Pony?	AWE Games	Microsoft Windows
2005	Hi Hi Puffy AmiYumi: Kaznapped!	Altron	Game Boy Advance
2006	PQ: Practical Intelligence Quotient (Note: North American/European publication)	Now Production	PlayStation Portable
2006	Naruto: Clash of Ninja (Note: North American distribution)	Eighting	GameCube
2006	Naruto: Ninja Council (Note: North American distribution)	Arc System Works	Game Boy Advance
2006	Cabbage Patch Kids: The Patch Puppy Rescue	1st Playable Productions	Game Boy Advance
2006	Hi Hi Puffy AmiYumi: The Genie and the Amp	Sensory Sweep Studios	Nintendo DS
2006	Naruto: Clash of Ninja 2 (Note: North American distribution)	Eighting	GameCube
2006	Naruto Ninja Council 2 (Note: North American distribution)	Aspect	Game Boy Advance
2006	Work Time Fun (Note: North American publication)	Sony Computer Entertainment	PlayStation Portable
2006	Flushed Away	Monkey Bar Games, Art Co., Ltd., Altron	PlayStation 2, GameCube, Game Boy Advance, Nintendo DS
2007	Fossil League: Dino Tournament Championship (Note: North American/European publication)	MTO	Nintendo DS
2007	Puzzle Quest: Challenge of the Warlords	Infinite Interactive, 1st Playable Productions	Nintendo DS, Microsoft Windows, PlayStation Portable, Xbox 360, PlayStation 2, Wii
2007	PQ2: Practical Intelligence Quotient 2 (Note: North American/European publication)	Now Production	PlayStation Portable
2007	Cube: 3D Puzzle Mayhem	Metia Interactive	PlayStation Portable
2007	Naruto: Ninja Council 3 (Note: North American distribution)	Aspect	Nintendo DS
2007	Dead Head Fred	Vicious Cycle Software	PlayStation Portable
2007	Horse Life	Neko Entertainment	Nintendo DS
2007	Naruto: Clash of Ninja Revolution	Eighting	Wii
2007	Ed, Edd n Eddy: Scam of the Century	Art Co., Ltd.	Nintendo DS
2007	Ben 10: Protector of Earth	High Voltage Software, 1st Playable Productions	PlayStation 2, Wii, PlayStation Portable, Nintendo DS
2008	Naruto: Ninja Destiny	DreamFactory	Nintendo DS
2008	Naruto: Clash of Ninja Revolution 2 (Note: North American distribution)	Eighting	Wii
2008	Puzzle Quest: Challenge of the Warlords	Infinite Interactive	OS X, PlayStation 3
2008	Dark Sector	Digital Extremes	PlayStation 3, Xbox 360
2008	Puzzle Quest: Challenge of the Warlords - Revenge of the Plague Lord (Note: Expansion pack for Puzzle Quest: Challenge of the Warlords)	Infinite Interactive	Xbox 360
2008	Bangai-O Spirits (Note: North American/European publication)	Treasure	Nintendo DS
2008	Shaun the Sheep	Art Co., Ltd.	Nintendo DS
2008	Ben 10: Alien Force	Monkey Bar Games, 1st Playable Productions	PlayStation 2, Wii, PlayStation Portable, Nintendo DS
2008	Jewel Master: Cradle of Rome (Note: North American publication)	cerasus.media	Nintendo DS
2009	Coraline	Papaya Studio	PlayStation 2, Wii, Nintendo DS
2009	Puzzle Quest: Galactrix	Infinite Interactive	Nintendo DS, Microsoft Windows, Xbox 360, PlayStation 3,
2009	Eat Lead: The Return of Matt Hazard	Vicious Cycle Software	PlayStation 3, Xbox 360
2009	Texas Cheat 'Em	Wideload Games	PlayStation 3, Xbox 360
2009	Family Party: 30 Great Games Outdoor Fun	Tamsoft	Wii
2009	Astro Boy: The Video Game	High Voltage Software, Art Co., Ltd.	PlayStation 2, Wii, PlayStation Portable, Nintendo DS
2009	The Secret Saturdays: Beasts of the 5th Sun	High Voltage Software, 1st Playable Productions	PlayStation 2, Wii, PlayStation Portable, Nintendo DS
2009	Ben 10 Alien Force: Vilgax Attacks	Papaya Studio, 1st Playable Productions	PlayStation 2, Wii, Xbox 360, PlayStation Portable, Nintendo DS
2009	Kamen Rider: Dragon Knight	Eighting, Natsume Co., Ltd.	Wii, Nintendo DS
2010	Matt Hazard: Blood Bath and Beyond	Vicious Cycle Software	PlayStation 3 (PSN), Xbox 360 (XBLA)
2010	Family Party: 30 Great Games Winter Fun	Tamsoft	Wii
2010	Kid Adventures: Sky Captain (Note: North American publication)	Torus Games	Wii
2010	Blue Dragon: Awakened Shadow (Note: North American publication, published by sister company Namco Bandai Games in Europe and Japan)	tri-Crescendo	Nintendo DS
2010	Puzzle Quest 2 (Note: Published by Namco Bandai Games in Europe.)	Infinite Interactive	Nintendo DS, Xbox 360 (XBLA), Microsoft Windows, iOS, Android
2010	Despicable Me: The Game (Note: Published by Namco Bandai Games in Europe.)	Monkey Bar Games	PlayStation 2, Wii, PlayStation Portable
2010	Despicable Me: The Game - Minion Mayhem (Note: Published by Namco Bandai Games in Europe.)	WayForward Technologies	Nintendo DS
2010	Kidz Bop Dance Party! The Video Game	Art Co., Ltd.	Wii
2010	Family Party: Fitness Fun (Note: Published by Namco Bandai Games in Europe.)	Tamsoft	Wii
2010	Ben 10 Ultimate Alien: Cosmic Destruction (Note: Published by Namco Bandai Games in Europe.)	Papaya Studio, Griptonite Games	PlayStation 2, PlayStation 3, Wii, Xbox 360, PlayStation Portable, Nintendo DS
2010	Family Party: 90 Great Games Party Pack (Note: A compilation of the first three Family Party entries. Published by Namco Bandai Games in Europe.)	Tamsoft	Wii
2010	Jillian Michaels Fitness Ultimatum 2011	Collision Studios	Wii
2010	Nat Geo Challenge! Wild Life (Note: North American publication)	Gusto Games	PlayStation 3, Xbox 360, Wii
2010	Yogi Bear: The Game (Note: Published by Namco Bandai Games in Europe.)	Monkey Bar Games, 1st Playable Productions	Wii, Nintendo DS
2011
2011	Gods Eater Burst (Note: North American publication, published by sister company Namco Bandai Games in Europe and Japan)	Shift	PlayStation Portable
2011	Bangai-O HD: Missile Fury	Treasure	Xbox 360 (XBLA)
2011	Dream Trigger 3D (Note: Published by Namco Bandai Games in Europe.)	Art Co., Ltd.	Nintendo 3DS
2011	Earth Defense Force: Insect Armageddon (Note: Published by Namco Bandai Games in Europe.)	Vicious Cycle Software	PlayStation 3, Xbox 360, Microsoft Windows
2011	Ben 10 Triple Pack (Note: Compilation of three previously-released Ben 10 titles. Published by Namco Bandai Games in Europe.)	1st Playable Productions	Nintendo DS
2011	White Knight Chronicles II (Note: North American publication)	Level-5, Japan Studio	PlayStation 3
2011	Angler's Club: Ultimate Bass Fishing 3D (Note: Published by Namco Bandai Games in Europe. Released in Japan in 2012, and North America in 2013.)	Tamsoft	Nintendo 3DS
2011	Ben 10: Galactic Racing (Note: Published by Namco Bandai Games in Europe.)	Monkey Bar Games, Tantalus Media	PlayStation 3, Xbox 360, Wii, Nintendo DS, Nintendo 3DS
2011	Victorious: Hollywood Arts Debut (Note: Published by Namco Bandai Games in Europe.)	Behaviour Interactive	Nintendo DS
2011	Victorious: Time to Shine (Note: Published by Namco Bandai Games in Europe.)	High Voltage Software	Xbox 360 (Kinect)
2012
2012	Ben 10: Galactic Racing (Note: Published by Namco Bandai Games in Europe.)	Monkey Bar Games	PlayStation Vita
2012	Madagascar - Join the Circus!	[x]cube GAMES	iOS
2012	Madagascar 3: The Video Game (Note: Published by Namco Bandai Games in Europe.)	Monkey Bar Games	PlayStation 3, Xbox 360, Wii, Nintendo DS, Nintendo 3DS
2012	iCarly: Groovy Foodie! (Note: Published by Namco Bandai Games in Europe.)	WayForward Technologies	Nintendo DS
2012	Winx Club: Magical Fairy Party (Note: Published by Namco Bandai Games in Europe.)	1st Playable Productions	Nintendo DS
2012	Pid	Might and Delight	PlayStation 3 (PSN), Xbox 360 (XBLA), Microsoft Windows, OS X
2012	Top Hand Rodeo Tour	SFC Rodeo Games	PlayStation 3 (PSN), Xbox 360 (XBLA)
2012	Karateka	Liquid Entertainment	PlayStation 3 (PSN), Xbox 360 (XBLA), Microsoft Windows
2012	Victorious: Taking the Lead (Note: Published by Namco Bandai Games in Europe.)	High Voltage Software, 1st Playable Productions	Wii, Nintendo DS
2012	Ben 10: Omniverse (Note: Published by Namco Bandai Games in Europe.)	Monkey Bar Games, 1st Playable Productions	PlayStation 3, Xbox 360, Wii, Wii U, Nintendo DS, Nintendo 3DS
2012	Adventure Time: Hey Ice King! Why'd You Steal Our Garbage?! (Note: The 3DS version was released in PAL-regions in 2014 as a digital-only title.)	WayForward Technologies	Nintendo DS, Nintendo 3DS
2012	Rise of the Guardians: The Video Game (Note: Published by Namco Bandai Games in Europe.)	Torus Games	PlayStation 3, Xbox 360, Wii, Wii U, Nintendo DS, Nintendo 3DS
2012	Family Party: 30 Great Games Obstacle Arcade (Note: Published by Namco Bandai Games in Europe.)	Art Co., Ltd.	Wii U
2013
2013	The Croods: Prehistoric Party! (Note: Published by Namco Bandai Games in Europe.)	Torus Games	Wii, Wii U, Nintendo DS, Nintendo 3DS
2013	Doodle Jump for Kinect	Smoking Gun Productions	Xbox 360 (XBLA Kinect)
2013	Turbo: Super Stunt Squad (Note: Published by Namco Bandai Games in Europe.)	Monkey Bar Games, Torus Games	PlayStation 3, Xbox 360, Wii, Wii U, Nintendo DS, Nintendo 3DS
2013	Marvel Puzzle Quest	Demiurge Studios	iOS, Android
2013	Regular Show: Mordecai and Rigby In 8-Bit Land (Note: Published by Namco Bandai Games in Europe.)	WayForward Technologies	Nintendo 3DS
2013	Ben 10: Omniverse 2 (Note: Published by Namco Bandai Games in Europe.)	High Voltage Software, 1st Playable Productions	PlayStation 3, Xbox 360, Wii, Wii U, Nintendo 3DS
2013	Adventure Time: Explore the Dungeon Because I Don't Know! (Note: Published by Namco Bandai Games in Europe.)	WayForward Technologies	PlayStation 3, Xbox 360, Wii U, Microsoft Windows, Nintendo 3DS
2013	Marvel Puzzle Quest: Dark Reign	Demiurge Studios	Microsoft Windows
2015
2015	Adventure Time Puzzle Quest	N/A	iOS, Android
2015	Magic: The Gathering – Puzzle Quest	Hibernum	iOS, Android
2015	Marvel Puzzle Quest: Dark Reign	WayForward	PlayStation 3, PlayStation 4, Xbox 360
2016
2016	Puzzle Quest: Challenge of the Warlords	Infinite Interactive	PlayStation 4
2016	Marvel Puzzle Quest: Dark Reign	WayForward	Xbox One
2019
2019	Alien: Blackout	N/A	iOS, Android
2019	Puzzle Quest: The Legend Returns	Infinity Plus 2	Nintendo Switch
2020
2020	G.I. Joe: War on Cobra	Emerald City Games	iOS, Android
