= John DiMaggio =

American actor (born 1968)

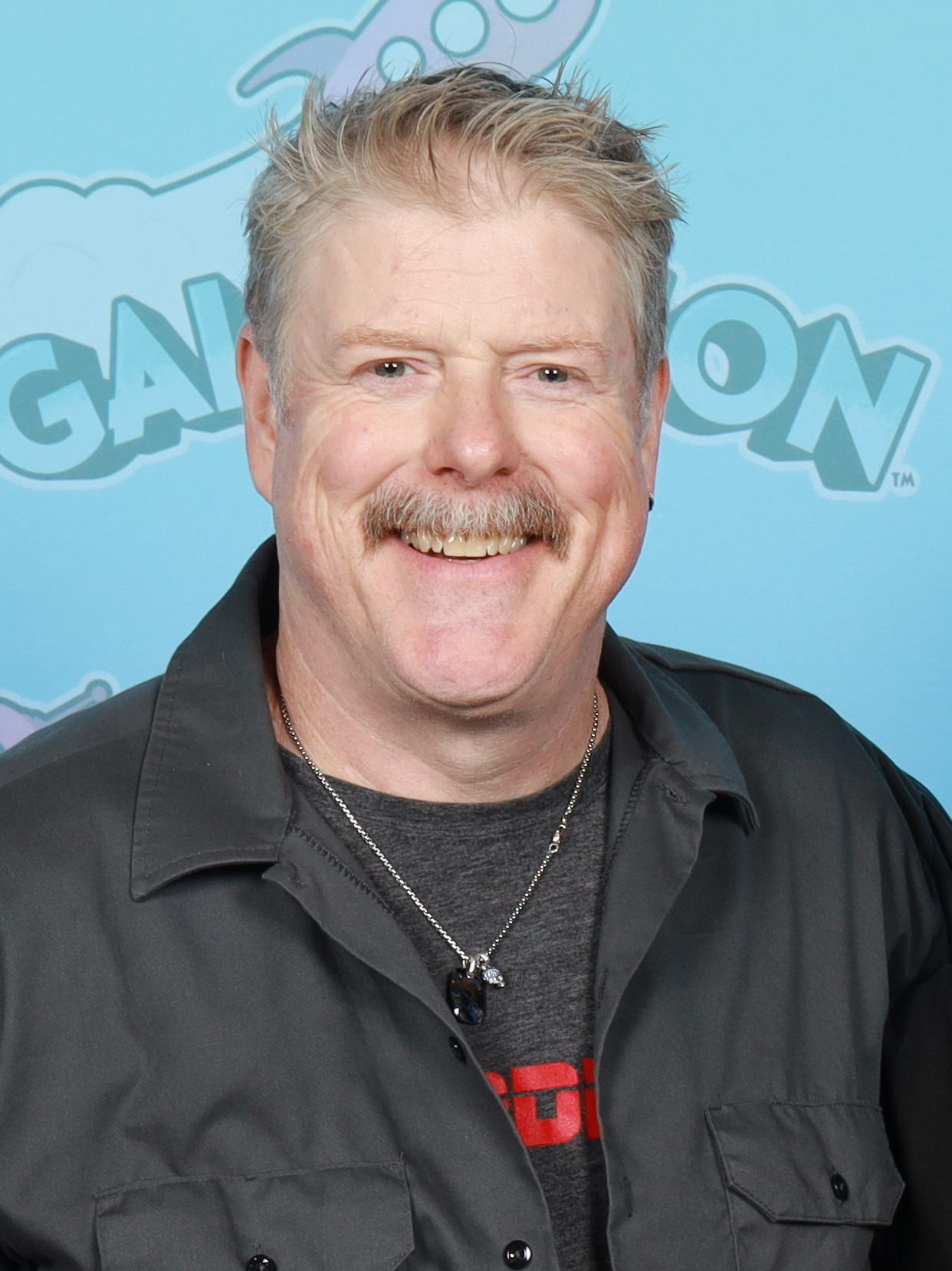
- DiMaggio at the 2025 GalaxyCon Oklahoma City
- Born: John William DiMaggio; September 4, 1968 (age 58); North Plainfield, New Jersey, U.S.
- Education: Rutgers University
- Occupation: Actor
- Years active: 1994–present
- Spouse: Kate Miller (m. 2014)

John William DiMaggio (/dɪˈmædʒoʊ/ dih-MAJ-oh; born September 4, 1968) is an American actor. He is known for voicing Bender in Futurama and Jake the Dog in Adventure Time.

== Early life ==
DiMaggio was born on September 4, 1968, and raised in North Plainfield, New Jersey. DiMaggio graduated from North Plainfield High School in 1986 where he acted in theater productions. One of his schoolmates was political strategist Steve Schmidt. He attended Rutgers University, majoring in theater, although he dropped out his junior year. DiMaggio started doing stand up comedy, where he did impressions and decided to become a voice actor after befriending Zak Orth.

== Career ==
DiMaggio is known for his roles as Bender in Futurama, Marcus Fenix in the Gears of War franchise, Dr. Drakken in Kim Possible, Jake the Dog in Adventure Time, Wakka and Kimahri in Final Fantasy X, and Niblet in Pound Puppies. He is a former comedian, appearing on stage as part of a comic duo named "Red Johnny and the Round Guy" and has several on-screen credits, such as Steve Ballmer in Pirates of Silicon Valley (the docudrama about the history of Apple Computer and Microsoft) and as Dr. Sean Underhill, a recurring character in Chicago Hope.

In 2013, DiMaggio was the executive producer and narrator of I Know That Voice, a documentary on voice acting, along with producer Tommy Reid and director Lawrence Shapiro.

In 2022, upon news that Futurama would be revived for a second time through Disney and Hulu, DiMaggio ran into conflict during negotiations while demanding more money to reprise the role of Bender, which he dubbed "#BenderGate". Fans supported DiMaggio's hold out for better pay, while DiMaggio stated that he felt the entire cast deserved better pay and that it reflected a corporate attempt to take advantage of voice actors. The effort also received support from DiMaggio's colleagues, including veteran voice actors Tara Strong, Kari Wahlgren, and Mark Hamill, while James Adomian noted that a casting call for a sound-alike of DiMaggio had been sent out by the studio. While it was initially reported that DiMaggio would not be returning to the role, he later announced his decision to return. DiMaggio revealed that though he did not succeed in negotiating a pay increase, he felt the attention to the issue of proper compensation in the voice acting industry was worthwhile.

== Personal life ==
DiMaggio lives in Los Angeles and New York City. He has been married to actress Kate Miller since 2014.

== Filmography ==
=== Live-action ===
==== Film ====
List of acting performances in film and television
| Year | Title | Role | Notes | Source |
|---|---|---|---|---|
| 2013 | I Know That Voice | Himself | Documentary; Also narrator, writer and producer | |

==== Television ====
List of acting performances in film and television
| Year | Title | Role | Notes | Source |
|---|---|---|---|---|
| 1996 | Law & Order | Bartender | Episode: "Charm City" | |
| 1996–1997 | Chicago Hope | Dr. Sean Underhill | recurring role; 11 episodes | |
| 1997 | Cracker | Simon | Episode: "Talk to Me" | |
| 1999 | Pirates of Silicon Valley | Steve Ballmer | Television film | |
| 2006 | My Name Is Earl | Officer Ross | Episode: "BB" | |
| 2008 | Bones | Jim Dodd | Episode: "The Man in the Outhouse" | |
| 2012 | Modern Family | Boat Captain | Episode: "Leap Day" | |
| 2013 | The Newsroom | Police Sergeant | Episode: "The Genoa Tip" | |
| 2018 | Superior Donuts | Craig | Episode: "The Chicago Way" | |
| 2019 | Historical Roasts | Angelo Dundee | Episode: "Muhammad Ali" | |
| 2020 | Better Call Saul | Construction Foreman | Episode: "Dedicado a Max" | |
| 2020; 2025 | Mythic Quest | Dan Williams | 4 episodes | |
| 2022 | Interview with the Vampire | Alderman Fenwick | 3 episodes | |
| 2023 | Perry Mason | Frank Finnerty | 3 episodes | |
| 2026-present | Best Medicine | Bert Large | recurring role; 11 episodes | |

=== Voice roles ===
==== Films ====
List of voice performances in feature films
| Year | Title | Role | Notes |
|---|---|---|---|
| 2001 | Dr. Dolittle 2 | Wassup Fish, Mouse, Seeing Eye Dog | |
| 2006 | Barnyard | Bud, Officer O'Hanlon | |
| 2007 | Happily N'Ever After | Dwarf #1, Dwarf #2, Giant | |
| 2007 | TMNT | Colonel Santino | |
| 2007 | Underdog | Bulldog, Supershep #4 | |
| 2007 | Bee Movie | Janitor, Bailiff | |
| 2008 | Bolt | Saul | |
| 2011 | Transformers: Dark of the Moon | Leadfoot | |
| 2012 | Wreck-It Ralph | Beard Papa | Cameo |
| 2014 | Transformers: Age of Extinction | Crosshairs | |
| 2016 | Zootopia | Jerry Jumbeaux Jr. | Cameo |
| 2017 | Transformers: The Last Knight | Crosshairs, Nitro Zeus | |
| 2018 | Teen Titans Go! To the Movies | Synth Skate Voice, Guard | |
| 2018 | Ralph Breaks the Internet | Arthur | |
| 2020 | Scoob! | Restaurant Owner | Cameo |
| 2023 | The Super Mario Bros. Movie | Uncle Arthur | Cameo |
| 2023 | Transformers: Rise of the Beasts | Stratosphere, Transit | |
| 2024 | Despicable Me 4 | Carl the Bus Driver | Cameo |
| TBA | Isla Monstro | Colonel Fergusen | |

==== Direct-to-video and television films ====
List of voice performances in direct-to-video and television films
| Year | Title | Role | Notes | Source |
|---|---|---|---|---|
| 1999 | Princess Mononoke | Gonza | English dub | |
| 2000 | Whispers: An Elephant's Tale | Tough Tusk, Fulla Bull | | |
| 2001 | Vampire Hunter D: Bloodlust | Nolt, Machira, John Elbourne, Sheriff | | |
| 2003 | The Animatrix | Crew Man, Kaiser | English dub | |
| 2003 | Castle in the Sky | Additional Voices | English dub | |
| 2004 | Scooby-Doo and the Loch Ness Monster | Colin Haggart, Volunteer #1 | | |
| 2004 | Van Helsing: The London Assignment | Coachman | | |
| 2005 | Pom Poko | Ryutaro, First Drunk | English dub | |
| 2005 | Tom and Jerry: The Fast and the Furry | Spike, J.W. | | |
| 2005 | Thru the Moebius Strip | Bodkus | | |
| 2006 | Asterix and the Vikings | Timandahaf | | |
| 2006 | Casper's Scare School | Stinkie, Frankengymteacher | | |
| 2007 | Futurama: Bender's Big Score | Bender | | |
| 2007 | Superman: Doomsday | Toyman / Winslow Schott | | |
| 2008 | Kung Fu Panda: Secrets of the Furious Five | Crocodile #1, Gorilla Bandit | | |
| 2008 | Futurama: Bender's Game | Bender / Titanius Anglesmith, Igner / Ignus | | |
| 2009 | Wonder Woman | Deimos | | |
| 2009 | Dragon Hunters | Fat John | | |
| 2009 | The Haunted World of El Superbeasto | Burt the Spurt | | |
| 2009 | Tinker Bell and the Lost Treasure | Minister of Autumn | | |
| 2010 | Scooby-Doo! Abracadabra-Doo | Amos the Groundskeeper | | |
| 2010 | Batman: Under the Red Hood | Joker / Red Hood | | |
| 2010 | Space Chimps 2: Zartog Strikes Back | Zartog, Human #1, Human #2 | | |
| 2011 | All-Star Superman | Samson | | |
| 2011 | Mia and the Migoo | Jekhide | | |
| 2011 | Scooby-Doo! Legend of the Phantosaur | Friz, GPS, Bikers, others | | |
| 2012 | Back to the Sea | Boss | | |
| 2012 | Tom and Jerry: Robin Hood and His Merry Mouse | Little John | | |
| 2012 | Tinker Bell and the Secret of the Wings | Minister of Autumn | | |
| 2012 | Dino Time | Horace, Big Guard | | |
| 2013 | Scooby-Doo! Mask of the Blue Falcon | Mr. Hyde | | |
| 2013 | Tom and Jerry's Giant Adventure | Meathead | | |
| 2014 | Stan Lee's Mighty 7 | Chopper Pilot | | |
| 2014 | Batman: Assault on Arkham | King Shark | | |
| 2015 | Lego DC Comics Super Heroes: Justice League vs. Bizarro League | Deathstroke, Lex Luthor | | |
| 2015 | Batman Unlimited: Animal Instincts | Killer Croc | | |
| 2015 | Lego DC Comics Super Heroes: Justice League: Attack of the Legion of Doom | Lex Luthor, Joker | | |
| 2016 | Batman: Bad Blood | Tusk | | |
| 2016 | Lego DC Comics Super Heroes: Justice League: Gotham City Breakout | Deathstroke | | |
| 2016 | Batman: The Killing Joke | Carlos Francesco | | |
| 2016 | DC Super Hero Girls: Hero of the Year | Vice-Principal Gorilla Grodd | | |
| 2016 | Batman Unlimited: Mechs vs. Mutants | Killer Croc, General Sam Lane | | |
| 2017 | Batman and Harley Quinn | Sarge Steel | | |
| 2018 | Scooby-Doo! & Batman: The Brave and the Bold | Aquaman, Mr. Freeze, Crimson Cloak | | |
| 2018 | Batman: Gotham by Gaslight | Harvey Bullock, Big Bill Dust | | |
| 2018 | Lego DC Super Hero Girls: Super-Villain High | Gorilla Grodd, Wildcat | | |
| 2019 | Batman vs. Teenage Mutant Ninja Turtles | Mr. Freeze | | |
| 2020 | Justice League Dark: Apokolips War | King Shark, Trigon | | |
| 2020 | Batman: Death in the Family | Joker, Thomas Wayne, Reporter #2 | | |
| 2020 | Ben 10 Versus the Universe: The Movie | Four Arms, Phil Billings | | |
| 2021 | Batman: The Long Halloween | Jervis Tetch / Mad Hatter | | |
| 2022 | Drifting Home | Yasuji Kumagaya | English dub | |
| 2023 | Batman: The Doom That Came to Gotham | Commissioner Gordon | | |
| 2023 | Justice League: Warworld | Lobo | | |
| 2024 | Justice League: Crisis on Infinite Earths - Part Three | Lobo | | |
| 2024 | No Time to Spy: A Loud House Movie | Bud Grouse, Flop, Henchman Mo | | |
| 2025 | A Loud House Christmas Movie: Naughty or Nice | Flip, Bud Grouse, Patchy Drizzle | | |

==== Television ====
List of voice performances in animation
| Year | Title | Role | Notes | Source |
|---|---|---|---|---|
| 1994–96 | The Head | Various characters | First voice acting role | |
| 1997, 2004 | Johnny Bravo | Various characters | 2 episodes | |
| 1999 | Rugrats | First Mate | Episode: "Submarine/Chuckie's a Lefty" | |
| 1999 | Todd McFarlane's Spawn | Various characters | | |
| 1999–present | Futurama | Bender, Yancy Fry Sr., Igner, Joey Mousepad, Robot Santa (2nd time), Barbados Slim (season 4–7), Elzar, Officer URL (season 1–7), Sal, Flexo, Mr. Panucchi, Randy Munchnik, various characters | Main role | |
| 2000 | Rocket Power | Mongo | | |
| 2000–01 | Zombie College | Zeke | | |
| 2001–02 | Lloyd in Space | Herb, Lou 2000 | 2 episodes | |
| 2001–05 | Jackie Chan Adventures | Hak Foo, Doctor, additional voices | | |
| 2001–17 | Samurai Jack | The Scotsman, others | | |
| 2002–07 | Kim Possible | Dr. Drakken, Motor Ed | | |
| 2002–05 | Codename: Kids Next Door | Big Brother, Emperor Dave | | |
| 2003 | Star Wars: Clone Wars | General Grievous, Sha'a Gi | | |
| 2003–05 | Teen Titans | Brother Blood, Spike | | |
| 2003–05 | Duck Dodgers | Crusher, others | | |
| 2004 | Dave the Barbarian | Gagnar | | |
| 2004 | Static Shock | Tarmack | Episode: "Where the Rubber Meets the Road" | |
| 2004 | The Powerpuff Girls | Various characters | 2 episodes | |
| 2004–05 | The Batman | Rhino, Mugsy | | |
| 2005, 2014 | The Simpsons | Bender | 2 episodes | |
| 2005, 2014 | The Boondocks | Rich Partygoers, Steve Wilkos | 2 episodes | |
| 2005 | Catscratch | Various characters | | |
| 2005 | Justice League Unlimited | Dreamslayer | Episode: "Shadow of the Hawk" | |
| 2005 | Ben 10 | Baron Highway, Vulkanus | | |
| 2005 | Lilo & Stitch: The Series | Fu Dog, Dr. Drakken | 2 episodes | |
| 2005–07 | American Dragon: Jake Long | Fu Dog | | |
| 2006 | Korgoth of Barbaria | Stink, Skrotus, others | | |
| 2006–08 | Avatar: The Last Airbender | Actor Toph, Actor Iroh, Additional voices | | |
| 2006–20 | American Dad! | Various characters | 15 episodes | |
| 2007 | Afro Samurai | Brother 2, Ivanov | English dub | |
| 2007 | SpongeBob SquarePants | Blackjack | Episode: "Blackjack" | |
| 2007 | El Tigre: The Adventures of Manny Rivera | El Oso, others | | |
| 2007 | All Grown Up! | Hungarian Man | Episode: "O Bro, Where Art Thou?" | |
| 2007–09 | Tak and the Power of Juju | Keeko, Husband Stone Head, Repulsive Juju, Monkey, various characters | | |
| 2007–10 | Chowder | Shnitzel, others | | |
| 2008–11 | Back at the Barnyard | Hilly Burford, Fred O'Hanlon, Bud, Various characters | | |
| 2008–11 | Batman: The Brave and the Bold | Aquaman, Gorilla Grodd, Faceless Hunter, Black Adam, Black Mask, Toyman, Vigilante, Hellgrammite, Mr. Freeze, Captain Boomerang, Typhon, Enemy Ace, Ubu, Legionnaire | | |
| 2008–10 | Ben 10: Alien Force | Rath, Vulkanus, Octagon Vreedle, Judge Domstol, Ragnarok, Doug, Computer Voice | | |
| 2008–09 | The Spectacular Spider-Man | Hammerhead, Sandman | | |
| 2008, 2015 | Phineas and Ferb | Pinhead Pierre, Conk | 2 episodes | |
| 2008–15 | The Penguins of Madagascar | Rico, Bada, Burt, others | | |
| 2009–12 | Fanboy & Chum Chum | Yum Yum the Gum | | |
| 2010–12 | Kick Buttowski: Suburban Daredevil | Mr. Vickle | | |
| 2010–18 | Adventure Time | Jake the Dog, others | Main cast | |
| 2010–14 | Fish Hooks | Jocktopus | | |
| 2010–13 | Generator Rex | Bobo Haha, others | | |
| 2010–13 | Planet Sheen | Guard #2 | | |
| 2010–13 | Pound Puppies | Niblet, others | | |
| 2010–12 | Ben 10: Ultimate Alien | Aggregor, Dagon, Vulkanus, Rath, Zombozo, various characters | | |
| 2010–11 | Sym-Bionic Titan | The King, General Julius Steel, Muculox, Adnon | | |
| 2010 | Transformers: Prime | Vogel | | |
| 2010 | The Avengers: Earth's Mightiest Heroes | Eitri | Episode: "The Fall of Asgard" | |
| 2011–13 | The Problem Solverz | Narrator, Teacher, The Mewmeoh, Jerry, Gary, Tux Dog, Badcat | | |
| 2011–16 | Kung Fu Panda: Legends of Awesomeness | Fung, Wall Eye, Bing, others | | |
| 2012 | Green Lantern: The Animated Series | Kothack | | |
| 2012 | Ultimate Spider-Man | Wrecker, Grizzly, others | | |
| 2012 | The High Fructose Adventures of Annoying Orange | Big Rock Candy Monster | | |
| 2012 | Kaijudo | Master Nigel Brightmore, Heller, Toji, Vorg, Lord Skycrusher, others | | |
| 2012 | Ben 10: Omniverse | Will Harangue, Zombozo, Octagon Vreedle, Bubble Helmet, Vulkanus, Colonel Rozum, Judge Domstol, Centur Squaar, Four Arms, Armodrillo, Rath, Humungousaur, Bullfrag, Whampire, Atomix | | |
| 2012 | Teenage Mutant Ninja Turtles | Pizzaface, Zeno, others | | |
| 2012–16 | Gravity Falls | Manly Dan, Harry Claymore, Love God | | |
| 2012–15 | Randy Cunningham: 9th Grade Ninja | Hannibal McFist, others | | |
| 2012–13 | Brickleberry | Various characters | | |
| 2013, 2015 | Aqua Teen Hunger Force | Master Shake's Muscles, Dr. Zord | 2 episodes | |
| 2013 | Out There | Wayne | | |
| 2013 | The Animated Tales of GWAR | Beefcake the Mighty | | |
| 2013 | Avengers Assemble | Wrecker, Galactus | | |
| 2013 | Hulk and the Agents of S.M.A.S.H. | Galactus, Firelord, Null, Obnoxio the Clown | | |
| 2013 | Turbo Fast | Various characters | | |
| 2013–present | Teen Titans Go! | Brother Blood, Shazam (Billy Batson), Shazam (wizard) | | |
| 2013–16 | Sanjay and Craig | Penny Pepper, Noodman's Father, Noodman's Grandfather, others | | |
| 2014 | Breadwinners | Lava Moles | | |
| 2014 | TripTank | Various characters | | |
| 2014 | Lego DC Comics: Batman Be-Leaguered | Lex Luthor, Joker | | |
| 2014 | All Hail King Julien | Jumping Rats | Episode: "One More Cup" | |
| 2014–18 | Clarence | Mel Sumouski | | |
| 2015–18 | The Adventures of Puss in Boots | Mole King, others | | |
| 2015–18 | Miles from Tomorrowland | Aggro, others | | |
| 2015 | Transformers: Robots in Disguise | Groundpounder, Farnum | | |
| 2015 | Pig Goat Banana Cricket | Various characters | | |
| 2015 | Guardians of the Galaxy | Lunatik | | |
| 2015 | Be Cool, Scooby-Doo! | Various characters | | |
| 2015 | The Mr. Peabody & Sherman Show | George Stephenson | Episode: "George Stephenson" | |
| 2015 | Golan the Insatiable | Mayor of Oak Grove, Kruung | | |
| 2016–present | The Loud House | Bud Grouse, Chunk, Flip, Patchy Drizzle, Pep, Tyler, others | | |
| 2016 | Morris and the Cow | Windy Joe | | |
| 2016 | Lego Star Wars: The Freemaker Adventures | Baash, others | | |
| 2016 | Uncle Grandpa | Jake the Dog | Episode: "Pizza Eve" | |
| 2016-21 | Ben 10 | Four Arms, Maurice, Zombozo, others | | |
| 2016–18 | Skylanders Academy | Chef Pepper Jack, Bad Breath, Fisticuffs | | |
| 2017 | F Is for Family | Scoop Dunbarton | | |
| 2017 | We Bare Bears | Ralph | 2 episodes | |
| 2017–19 | Rick and Morty | Death Stalker Leader, Knight, Trandor, Bully #2, Gramuflack Reporter | 4 episodes | |
| 2017–18 | Spider-Man | Raymond Warren / Jackal | | |
| 2018–23 | Disenchantment | King Zøg, Freckles | | |
| 2018–21 | Final Space | Terk, Superior Stone, additional voices | | |
| 2018 | Rise of the Teenage Mutant Ninja Turtles | Joey the Junkyard Dog | Episode: "Mascot Melee" | |
| 2018 | Voltron: Legendary Defender | Tavo, Ozar | | |
| 2018 | DuckTales | Fisher, Clown, Strongbeard | 3 episodes | |
| 2018 | OK K.O.! Let's Be Heroes | Four Arms, Schnitzel, Jake the Dog | Episode: "Cartoon Nexus" | |
| 2018–20 | Tigtone | Memory Gnome, Bridge Smither, Lord Festus, Bard Sword, Festroll | | |
| 2019–22 | Amphibia | Stumpy | | |
| 2019 | Love, Death & Robots | Mike | Episode: "Ice Age" | |
| 2019 | Scooby-Doo and Guess Who? | Abraham Lincoln, Jebb | | |
| 2019 | Star Wars Resistance | Vranki the Blue | Episode: "The Voxx Vortex 5000" | |
| 2019 | Cleopatra in Space | Gled | Episode: "Humility" | |
| 2020 | It's Pony | Dave | | |
| 2020 | Spitting Image | Pope Francis, Elon Musk | Series regular | |
| 2020 | The Casagrandes | Flip | Episode: "Cursed!" | |
| 2020–21 | Animaniacs | The Incredible Gnome in People's Mouths | 2 episodes | |
| 2021 | Adventure Time: Distant Lands | Jake the Dog | Episode: "Together Again" | |
| 2021–22 | Middlemost Post | Angus | | |
| 2021–22 | Inside Job | Glenn Dolphman | | |
| 2022 | The Boys Presents: Diabolical | Groundhawk | "Nubian vs. Nubian" | |
| 2023–25 | Star Wars: Young Jedi Adventures | Ansen Strung, Local Aklyrr Expert | | |
| 2023–present | Adventure Time: Fionna and Cake | Jake the Dog | | |
| 2024 | Batman: Caped Crusader | Harvey Bullock | | |
| 2024 | Angry Birds Mystery Island | Scottish Pig | | |
| 2025–present | Invincible | The Elephant, various voices | | |
| 2026 | Smiling Friends | Uncle Bilbert | Episode: "Charlie's Uncle Dies and Doesn't Come Back" | |
| 2026 | Adventure Time: Side Quests | Jake the Dog | | |

==== Video games ====
List of voice performances in video games
| Year | Title | Role | Notes | Source |
|---|---|---|---|---|
| 1997 | The Space Bar | Ni'Dopal, Click Snap Snap Rattle | | |
| 1999 | T'ai Fu: Wrath of the Tiger | T'ai Fu | | |
| 2001 | Final Fantasy X | Wakka, Kimahri Ronso | English dub | |
| 2003 | Crash Nitro Kart | Tiny Tiger | | |
| 2003 | Final Fantasy X–2 | Kimahri Ronso, Wakka | English dub | |
| 2003 | Futurama | Bender, Igner, Sal | | |
| 2003 | Spawn: Armageddon | Redeemer, Space Station Crew | | |
| 2004 | Samurai Jack: The Shadow of Aku | The Scotsman, The King, Announcer, The Tree Spirit | | |
| 2004 | X-Men Legends | Juggernaut, General William Kincaid | | |
| 2004 | Spider-Man 2 | Rhino | | |
| 2004 | Vampire: The Masquerade – Bloodlines | Smiling Jack | | |
| 2005 | Shadow of Rome | Additional voices | | |
| 2005 | X-Men Legends II: Rise of Apocalypse | Juggernaut | | |
| 2006 | Final Fantasy XII | Migelo, Gilgamesh | English dub | |
| 2006 | Gears of War | Marcus Fenix | | |
| 2007 | Halo 3 | Brute Chieftain | | |
| 2007 | Spider-Man: Friend or Foe | Rhino | | |
| 2007 | Crash of the Titans | Uka Uka | | |
| 2007 | The Simpsons Game | Bender | | |
| 2008 | Ben 10: Alien Force | Gorvan, Vulkanus | | |
| 2008 | Valkyria Chronicles | Gen. Georg von Damon | English dub | |
| 2008 | Crash: Mind over Mutant | Uka Uka | | |
| 2008 | Gears of War 2 | Marcus Fenix, Franklin Tsoko | | |
| 2008 | Tak and the Guardians of Gross | Keeko | | |
| 2009 | Afro Samurai | Brother 2 | | |
| 2009 | MadWorld | Kreese Kreely | | |
| 2009 | Transformers: Revenge of the Fallen | Sideways, Maj. Lennox | | |
| 2009 | Cartoon Network Universe: FusionFall | Scotsman, Shnitzel, Bobo Haha, Rath, Jake the Dog | | |
| 2010 | Final Fantasy XIII | Cocoon Inhabitants | | |
| 2010 | Batman: The Brave and The Bold - The Videogame | Aquaman, Gorilla Grodd | | |
| 2010 | Ben 10 Alien Force: Vilgax Attacks | Vilgax, Octagon Vreedle | | |
| 2010 | Valkyria Chronicles II | Drill Instructor | | |
| 2010 | Spider-Man: Shattered Dimensions | Hammerhead | | |
| 2010 | Ben 10 Ultimate Alien: Cosmic Destruction | Rath, Vulkanus, Zombozo, Octagon Vreedle, Will Harangue | | |
| 2010 | Scooby-Doo! and the Spooky Swamp | Dustin Planks | | |
| 2011 | Gears of War 3 | Marcus Fenix | | |
| 2011 | Ben 10: Galactic Racing | Vilgax, Rath, Octagon Vreedle | | |
| 2011 | Generator Rex: Agent of Providence | Bobo Haha, Quarry | | |
| 2011 | Star Wars: The Old Republic | Nico Okarr | | |
| 2012 | Ben 10: Omniverse | Octagon Vreedle, Four Arms | | |
| 2012 | Guild Wars 2 | Canach | | |
| 2012 | Adventure Time: Hey Ice King! Why'd You Steal Our Garbage?!! | Jake the Dog | | |
| 2013 | Gears of War: Judgment | Marcus Fenix | | |
| 2013 | Ben 10: Omniverse 2 | Watchmaker, Four Arms | | |
| 2014 | Destiny | Banshee-44, City Civilian | | |
| 2014 | Halo 2 Anniversary | Sesa 'Refumee | Terminals only | |
| 2015 | Lego Dimensions | Jake the Dog | | |
| 2016 | Gears of War 4 | Marcus Fenix | | |
| 2017 | Crash Bandicoot N. Sane Trilogy | Uka Uka, Tiny Tiger | Grouped under "Voice Actors" | |
| 2017 | Halo Wars 2 | Atriox | | |
| 2018 | Hearthstone | Dr. Boom | | |
| 2019 | Crash Team Racing Nitro-Fueled | Tiny Tiger, Uka Uka, Ebeneezer Von Clutch | | |
| 2019 | Gears 5 | Marcus Fenix | | |
| 2019 | Freedom Finger | The Comrade, Pee Pants Dude | | |
| 2020 | Final Fantasy VII Remake | Heidegger | | |
| 2020 | Samurai Jack: Battle Through Time | Scotsman, Ezekiel Clench | | |
| 2021 | Crash Bandicoot: On the Run! | Tiny Tiger, Uka Uka | | |
| 2022 | MultiVersus | Jake the Dog | | |
| 2024 | Final Fantasy VII Rebirth | Heidegger | | |
| 2026 | Gears of War: E-Day | Marcus Fenix | | |

== Awards and nominations ==
| Year | Award | Category | Film/TV show | Results |
|---|---|---|---|---|
| 2001 | Annie Awards | Outstanding Individual Achievement for Voice Acting by a Male Performer in an Animated Television Production | Futurama | Won |
| 2006 | Interactive Achievement Awards | Outstanding Achievement in Character Performance - Male | Gears of War | Won |
| 2011 | Golden Raspberry Awards | Worst Screen Ensemble (shared with the entire cast) | Transformers: Dark of the Moon | Nominated |
