= Adventure Time: Finn & Jake Investigations =

2015 video game

- North American boxart
- Developer: Vicious Cycle Software
- Publisher: Little Orbit
- Designer: Dave Ellis
- Writer: Dave Ellis
- Composer: Rod Abernethy
- Series: Adventure Time
- Platforms: Nintendo 3DS; PlayStation 3 PlayStation 4 Wii U Windows; Xbox 360; Xbox One
- Release: NA: October 20, 2015; EU: November 6, 2015
- Genre: Action-adventure
- Mode: Single-player

Adventure Time: Finn & Jake Investigations is a 2015 action adventure video game developed by Vicious Cycle Software and published by Little Orbit. It was released on Nintendo 3DS, PlayStation 3, PlayStation 4, Wii U, Windows, Xbox 360 and Xbox One in 2015. This is the fourth game based on the animated television series Adventure Time following The Secret of the Nameless Kingdom, and the first action-adventure title in the series presented in full 3D graphics. The game was first announced on April 21, 2015, and released on October 20, 2015, in North America, and on November 6 in Europe.

The game was removed from digital storefronts on March 31, 2018, due to the expiration of Little Orbit's Adventure Time license.

== Overview ==
Players check out Land of Ooo locales, talk to characters, sharpen their creative puzzle-solving skills, and defeat bad guys. Loosely based on the TV show's sixth season, the game features a focus on exploring, investigating, and puzzle-solving. Thanks to the discovery of an assignment printing machine called the 'tickertype,' Finn and Jake decide to become detectives like their parents, Joshua and Margaret. Players gradually fill the treasure room of Finn and Jake's Tree House with treasure from enemies that they defeat.

== Reception ==
Reception

Aggregate score
Aggregator	Score
Metacritic	66/100

Review scores
Publication	Score
Nintendo Life	7/10
Nintendo World Report	7/10

It has a score of 66 on Metacritic.

Nintendo Life awarded it a score of 7 out of 10, saying "While it might prove too basic for more advanced players, younger players and families should have a fun time questing with dog and human. Big fans of the show, of course, should not feel so afraid to give this one a try, either."

Nintendo World Report awarded it a score of 7 out of 10, saying "By default, I feel as if this is the best Adventure Time video game so far. It's not perfect, and it's a little on the easy side, but as an Adventure Time fan, it made me smile."
