= Dead Head Fred =

2007 video game

- Developer: Vicious Cycle Software
- Publisher: D3 Publisher
- Designer: Adam Cogan
- Composer: Jason Graves
- Engine: Vicious Engine
- Platforms: PlayStation Portable; PlayStation Store
- Release: PSP: NA: August 28, 2007; EU: October 26, 2007; AU: November 2, 2007; JP: March 27, 2008; PS Store (PSP): NA: October 16, 2008; PS Store (PS Vita): NA/EU: May 2012
- Genre: Action-adventure
- Mode: Single-player

Dead Head Fred is a 2007 action-adventure game for the PlayStation Portable, developed by Vicious Cycle Software and published by D3 Publisher. It was released in North America on August 28, 2007, and is powered by Vicious Cycle's proprietary Vicious Engine. It features a premise that is a combination of 1940s-style noir and contemporary horror, dubbed "twisted noir" by the design team.

Dead Head Fred is a single-player game whose title character, Fred Neuman, is a private investigator with the ability to switch heads. Fred has been murdered and decapitated, and has few memories of the events leading to his death. The plot follows Fred as he pieces together the clues of his murder and tries to get revenge on the man who killed him. Fred has no conventional weapons—he relies solely on the powers available to him from the severed heads of fallen enemies.

Dead Head Fred received generally positive reviews from critics, with them mentioning its dark humor and noir-inspired motif as high points. It received criticism for its controls and lack of combat depth. In 2008, it won the Writers Guild of America's first-ever award for video game writing.

== Gameplay ==
Dead Head Fred is a third-person action-adventure game that incorporates a variety of gameplay styles, including combat, platforming, and puzzles. The core gameplay of Dead Head Fred revolves around Fred's missing head and his ability to "switch" heads by defeating certain enemies, decapitating them, and collecting their heads (referred to as "headhunting"). As Fred explores the city of Hope Falls, he can collect an assortment of heads, each of which has unique abilities. Examples include the Stone Idol head, which Fred can use as a battering ram, and the Corpse head, which can be used to suck up and spit out water, gasoline, and other materials. Fred uses these heads to navigate the city of Hope Falls, and certain parts of the city are not accessible until certain heads are found. The high level of radiation in Hope Falls has led to a proliferation of grossly mutated worms, which the player can collect and use to upgrade Fred's heads and temporarily increase his fighting abilities, among other benefits. Also collectible are money and special items, which can be earned by defeating enemies or completing various side-missions. There are several minigames unrelated to the plot, such as pinball and fishing, scattered around the city.

Fred, with the Bone head equipped, removing the head of an enemy.

In combat, players have several attacks at their disposal, depending on the head Fred is equipped with. These attacks include combos, head-specific counterattacks, and ranged attacks. During a counterattack, the player can complete a quick time event to instantly kill an enemy by removing its head, which gives Fred "Rage" points. Rage energy builds up over time, and the player can use it to unleash powerful attacks on multiple foes. Dealing a large amount of damage to an opponent will stun them, during which time Fred can remove their head. Collected heads can be traded at "Head Shops" for a usable version.

There are several types of environmental puzzles that the player has to solve in order to progress through the game. Each one requires a specific head—the Bone head gives Fred sharp claws which allow him to climb on the sides of buildings, while the Shrunken head decreases his size dramatically and lets him navigate platforming levels, such as a saw mill. There is also a mannequin head that Fred must use to socialize with the residents of Hope Falls, because they are terrified of his other heads. There are nine available heads, seven of which are suitable for combat.

== Plot ==
=== Setting ===
Dead Head Fred takes place in Hope Falls, New Jersey, a once-prosperous area based on American cities in the 1940s. The city has steadily fallen from grace since a business mogul named Ulysses Pitt began accumulating power. Pitt has a background of petty crime, and there are allegations that he was somehow responsible for the disappearance of Vinni Rossini, an influential Hope Falls businessman. Pitt's new "Nukular Plant" has recently finished construction and has caused a high level of radiation in the city, leading to strange phenomena like mutated wildlife and undead monsters.

Hope Falls is composed of several areas. The first that Fred has access to is Dr. Steiner's castle, the ancestral home of the Steiner family where Fred has been resurrected. Outside of the castle is a large cemetery that borders the forested area of Creepy Hollow. In Hope Falls proper are the urban areas of Downtown, Uptown, Old Hope Falls and Zombietown. Downtown is the home of Pitt's headquarters, and Fred's office is found in Old Hope Falls. Zombietown, as its name suggests, is overrun with zombies and most of its residents have fled the neighborhood or barricaded themselves in their homes. Two other rural areas border the city: Freak Farms, where Fred owns a small cabin, and the Boonies, a highly irradiated area where the Nukular Reactor has been built. Each area contains several teleporters in the form of sewer manholes, which Fred can use to quickly move from one area of Hope Falls to another.

=== Characters ===
The player character of Dead Head Fred is Fred Neuman (voiced by John C. McGinley), a private detective. Fred is the only playable character, but since each head gives him a different set of animations, he could be considered nine separate characters. As he does not have a proper face, Fred's mood is portrayed by the tone of his voice and by face-like expressions formed by his eyes and frontal lobes. Fred has a wisecracking, sarcastic personality and occasionally breaks the fourth wall, such as heckling the player when he dies. Ulysses Pitt (Jon Polito), the game's primary antagonist, is a small-time hoodlum turned racketeer. Pitt employs many henchmen throughout Hope Falls, the most prominent of which is his lieutenant Lefty, whose right leg has been amputated and replaced with a tommygun. Fred makes several allies throughout the game, including Dr. Steiner, who resurrected him, his girlfriend Jeanne Rossini (Kari Wahlgren), and his former partner Benny Salazar. Fred's enemies are generally employees of Pitt, like the skeletal "bone thugs", or creatures created by Hope Falls' radiation, like zombies and animated scarecrows.

=== Story ===
The game begins with Fred waking up in the castle of a Dr. Freidrich Steiner, an employee of Ulysses Pitt. Fred soon learns that he has been murdered and subsequently resurrected, and his head is missing. In its place is a liquid-filled jar that contains his brain and eyes. Steiner explains that Fred is a private detective who had been investigating Pitt, but Pitt had discovered that Fred was on to him and had him murdered. Many of Fred's memories are missing as a result of the trauma to his brain, and before Steiner can explain further, Pitt and several of his henchmen arrive. As Fred hides in Steiner's lab, Pitt's thugs apprehend Steiner and announce that he is to be taken to the Horseman, a minion of Pitt's who resides in Creepy Hollow.

Fred leaves Steiner's castle and meets a blue-skinned hunchback in the cemetery outside. The hunchback introduces himself as Sam Spade, a gravedigger and "head merchant" who can help Fred by providing him with quality interchangeable heads. Fred continues to Creepy Hollow, where he defeats the Horseman and rescues Dr. Steiner. Steiner, however, has little information regarding Fred's investigation and suggests that he question the residents of Hope Falls to learn more about his demise. Fred begins exploring Hope Falls, meeting many strange personalities along the way. He reconnects with his old girlfriend Jeanne, who is the daughter of a prominent Hope Falls citizen, Vinni Rossini. Fred learns that Mr. Rossini had been reported missing by Jeanne, and Jeanne had subsequently hired Fred to find him. Fred had eventually followed the trail to Pitt, who had bribed Fred's partner, Benny Salazar, into betraying him. Fred was promptly caught by Pitt's henchmen and shot to death by his right-hand man, Lefty.

Armed with the knowledge of his death and the events leading up to it, Fred continues his investigation and recovers a videotape of Vinni Rossini's murder that incriminates Pitt. Pitt learns that Fred is still "alive" and kidnaps Jeanne to use as leverage against him. Fred confronts the mobster at his headquarters after shutting down the centerpiece of his criminal enterprise, the Pitt Nukular Plant, and defeating Lefty. Lefty, however, was exposed to nuclear waste during the fight and subsequently mutated into a huge beast who comes to Pitt's aid in the game's final battle. Fred ultimately defeats both Pitt and Lefty atop the Pitt Building. Pitt is killed during the battle, but Lefty manages to escape and retreats to the remains of the Nukular Plant. After the battle, Fred's head, which, along with Jeanne, had been held hostage by Pitt, is shown tumbling into an open manhole near the Pitt Building, unbeknownst to Fred. The final scene of the game shows Fred and Jeanne having dinner at a restaurant to celebrate, with Fred lamenting the loss of his head.

== Development and release ==
=== Geo ===
Geo, the original incarnation of Fred.

Dead Head Fred uses the Vicious Engine, a game engine created and maintained by game design company Vicious Cycle Software. Considered "middleware" in the video game industry, the engine was designed as a simple set of creation tools that could be used across multiple consoles. The game was originally conceived as a platform game based on the character "Geo." Vicious Cycle's president, Eric Peterson, and some of his staff developed a conceptual world called "Prime" where Geo lived. Geo had the ability to switch his head between several different shapes (a cube, sphere, cylinder, and pyramid) that would help him solve puzzles, fight, and move around Prime in his quest to stop the evil King Rhombus, who was trying to destroy Prime. Each of Geo's shaped heads had unique properties that gave him different abilities—the sphere head allowed him to roll around very quickly, for example.

The Geo concept was described by the development team as similar to other platform games like Rayman or Spyro, and skewed towards a younger audience. When the concept was complete, the development team presented it to several publishers, who stated that they liked the idea but its geometry-based core too strongly resembled "edutainment", and that they were interested in developing a more edgy, adult premise. The GameCube had been an early choice for hosting the game before the PSP was chosen.

=== Noir setting ===
Vicious Cycle went back to the drawing board and produced a new concept that they felt was darker and better suited to an older audience. The "head-switching" game mechanic had been praised by the potential publishers and was kept, but this time the cartoonish, childlike Geo was replaced by an angry, vengeful private detective named Fred Neuman. The world of Prime was replaced with the bleak, film noir-esque city of Hope Falls, where Fred would seek revenge against those who had wronged him. Vicious Cycle presented the new project to Sony, who promptly approved the game for the PSP, despite it not having secured a publisher. Shortly afterwards, the project was picked up by D3Publisher.

Vicious Cycle then submitted the concept to art company Massive Black Studios to develop initial character sketches. Massive Black's artists were allowed to use their imagination while developing Fred, but the one stipulation Vicious Cycle made from the beginning was Fred's head—the developers wanted it to be a liquid-filled jar with the detective's brain and eyes floating around inside. Massive Black came up with several different versions of Fred, including some with guns, which lead designer Adam Cogan had already decided the game would not include. After receiving the sketches, Vicious Cycle chose several that portrayed Fred with a squat, childlike appearance that retained some of the youthful focus of the scrapped Geo project. The publisher, D3, decided to present all of the concept art to a test group. To the developers' surprise, the test group was much more interested in a darker, more intimidating portrayal of Fred than the cartoonish, playful look they had chosen. The developers decided to flesh out the concept and took the chosen sketches back to Massive Black. This time the art came back darker, with similarities to Dirty Harry and The Matrix and The Evil Dead, and a Norman Rockwell-inspired look that would influence the game's art style towards a more violent theme.

=== Further testing ===
D3 provided the development team with more focus groups, and as a result, the game slowly incorporated more combat and less platforming and puzzles. Fred's combat capabilities were revamped to give him more attacks, counterattacks and combinations. D3 also gave Vicious Cycle more time to develop the game, with the hope of receiving better reviews and potentially turning Dead Head Fred into a franchise. The delay pushed back the game's release from January to August 2007. D3Publisher bought Vicious Cycle two months before the game's release, but the company's headquarters remained in North Carolina and the staff was retained.

== Audio ==
=== Soundtrack ===
The music of Dead Head Fred was composed by Rod Abernethy and Jason Graves and recorded at Abernethy's studio, Rednote Audio. Abernethy and Graves had worked on previous games by Vicious Cycle, like Curious George. The composers were interested in developing a sound for Dead Head Fred that was retro-futuristic, and borrowed from other death-themed pieces like Stubbs the Zombie and Beetlejuice. The development team did not have any substantial ideas for the game's music beyond the theme and mood of Hope Falls, giving the composers free rein on the soundtrack's direction.

=== Voice work ===
A crucial area of development was the formation of the game's mood, theme, and story to give it a dark, yet humorous quality. Hiring a Hollywood screenwriter to create the script was proposed, but ultimately Vicious Cycle designer Dave Ellis was given the task of writing the game's cutscenes and voiceover script, while Cogan focused on the in-game dialog. Ellis referred to several noir films for inspiration, especially Miller's Crossing and Who Framed Roger Rabbit During this time, Eric Peterson cast several voice actors, including John C. McGinley from the TV show Scrubs and Jon Polito from the aforementioned Miller's Crossing. McGinley was cast as Fred because of his Scrubs character's sarcasm and wit, while Polito was cast in the role of mob boss Ulysses Pitt, which was very similar to his role of Johnny Caspar in Miller's Crossing.

The development team then set about recording the game's dialog, which proved to be challenging because of Vicious Cycle's location on the East Coast. All of the recordings were done over the phone at a studio in Hollywood. Despite this, and the fact that Fred alone had over 1000 lines of in-game dialog, the recording went smoothly, with the exception of one unidentified actor who walked out in the middle of a session. The original script had only one instance of the word "fuck", but several recording sessions with McGinley resulted in a great deal of colorful improvisation. The design team liked the recordings and the script was modified to permit McGinley and other actors to curse more. McGinley focused on portraying Fred as "pissed off" and "having a chip on his shoulder" because his head was missing.

"No, this guy was unique because, well… his head was gone! With him, you could really just open up your imagination and roll out a cavalcade of eccentricities and see what makes sense to you. It was pretty much unlike anything I've ever done before."

— John C. McGinley

== Promotion and release ==
Dead Head Fred was first announced at the Electronics Entertainment Expo (E3) video game convention in May 2006, where a trailer was shown to the public. Following this, little was heard about the game until Cogan started a developer diary on Vicious Cycle's website in March 2007. Three diary entries were written by Cogan and Ellis, which provided details about the game's pre-production conceptualization and voice work. In May 2007, D3 announced that John C. McGinley would be voicing Fred, and the next month the company issued a press release stating that the game was finished and ready for mass production. However, the game was delayed, allowing D3 Publisher to show it at E3 2007. It was eventually released on August 28, 2007, in North America after nearly two years of development. It was released on October 26 in Europe, November 2 in Australia, and March 19, 2008, in Japan. In December 2007, D3 reduced the price of the game, and in October 2008 it was made available for download on Sony's PlayStation Network. The soundtrack was released on iTunes by Lakeshore Records on September 18, 2007.

== Reception ==
Reception

Aggregate scores
Aggregator	Score
GameRankings	76.97%
Metacritic	75/100

Review scores
Publication	Score
Eurogamer	5/10
Game Informer	6/10
GameSpot	6.5/10
GameSpy	4/5
GameZone	8.5/10
IGN	8.3/10
VideoGamer.com	8/10

Award
Publication	Award
Writers Guild of America	Videogame Writing (2007)

=== Critical reception ===
Dead Head Fred received "generally favorable" reviews from critics, according to review aggregator website Metacritic.

The game's writing and dialogue were considered the main strengths of the game, with GameSpy's reviewer stating that "In the vast sea of PSP titles, Dead Head Fred stands 'head and shoulders' above the rest." IGN said "The tale of revenge in a dark world is twisted [and] unapologetically humorous". Other publications were not as impressed, however, with one reviewer stating "...the overused profanity just makes it feel like it's been designed by teenagers desperately trying to be edgy." The game's supernatural themes elicited comparisons to The Darkness and Grim Fandango. GamesRadar included it in their list of the 100 most overlooked games of its generation. Editor Jason Fanelli felt that PSP games often lacked creativity and that Dead Head Fred was the exception.

Many reviewers were pleased with the game's premise and setting, variously describing it as "weird", "wacky" and "silly". Hope Falls, especially the area of Creepy Hollow, was compared to the work of Tim Burton. Dead Head Fred's graphics were warmly received, with GameSpy noting "The game looks simply phenomenal on the PSP screen." Pocket Gamer UK said "graphically the game won't blow your head off but it is undeniably stylish." Pocket Gamer also felt that the game's level design, with its emphasis on changing heads to solve environmental puzzles, made up for the "mediocre combat system". The character design was praised; GameSpy said "Fred is one of the most interesting and entertaining characters to ever hit gaming," and GameZone said "Fred's freakish form is like looking at a car crash … you really don't want to stare but you just can't help it."

The voice acting, in particular John C. McGinley's portrayal of Fred, was widely praised, as was the rest of the game's audio. GameZone's Natalie Romano said "There's also some great music in the game and the sound effects are...wonderfully detailed".

"The sound for the title, however, is fantastic. The majority of it is centered around the voice acting, which is anchored by John C. McGinley of Scrubs and Office Space fame. McGinley expertly brings his dry, sarcastic delivery to Fred's lines and consistently delivers humorous lines across the entire game."

— Jeff Haynes, IGN

The focal point of reviewers' criticism was Dead Head Fred's gameplay, specifically the combat. It was generally considered tedious and repetitive. PALGNdescribed the combat as "one of the poorest elements of the game", and Game Informer called the combat mechanics "awful". The performance of the camera was also criticized, with IGN noting "Considering that the camera will sometimes choose some horrible angles for you in battle or during puzzles, it's annoying to have to fight it as well as mutants that want you dead." GameZone said "I just wish the camera wouldn't be such a hindrance sometimes." Reviewers were also unhappy with Dead Head Fred's loading times; Eurogamer considered them "excessively high", and IGN said "The only downside that crops up when it comes to the visuals are the continual loading times on just about every single area."

=== Awards ===
Dead Head Fred was nominated for several awards, including the Writers Guild of America's first award for video game writing, which it won. During E3 2007, the game was nominated for the Best of E3 2007: Best Handheld Game award by the Game Critics Awards, a group of prominent media journalists. Dead Head Fred lost to The Legend of Zelda: Phantom Hourglass for the Nintendo DS, but was notable for being the only new intellectual property nominated in the handheld category. The audio was nominated for two awards at the Game Audio Network Guild's 6th annual ceremony, Best Soundtrack of the Year and Best Handheld Audio. Dead Head Fred lost to BioShock and Syphon Filter: Logan's Shadow, respectively.

== Future ==
Dead Head Fred was designed specifically for the PSP, and Vicious Cycle intended it to be their "flagship" title for the system. However, the game's designers hinted that the game could potentially be ported to the PlayStation Network or Xbox Live Arcade with a few months' work. As of March 2009, D3Publisher announced a sequel, but the designers stated that subsequent titles were discussed during the game's development. John C. McGinley has expressed interest in reprising Fred. Namco Bandai Games (the parent of D3) were impressed with the game and wanted to publish the sequel because they "wanted" to test out Vicious Cycle's gameplay on the PSP.

However, Vicious Cycle was shut down in 2016 and its publisher D3 Publisher of America has shifted its focus to mobile gaming a year before (changing its name to D3 GO!), making the future of the game unknown.
