= Ben 10: Omniverse 2 =

2013 video game

- Developers: High Voltage Software; 1st Playable Productions (3DS)
- Publishers: NA: D3 Publisher; EU: Namco Bandai Games
- Writers: Micah Skaritka; Charlotte Fullerton
- Composer: Rod Abernethy
- Series: Ben 10
- Engine: Vicious Engine 2
- Platforms: Nintendo 3DS; PlayStation 3; Wii; Wii U; Xbox 360
- Release: NA: November 5, 2013; EU: November 22, 2013
- Genre: Beat 'em up
- Mode: Single-player

Ben 10: Omniverse 2 is a 2013 action video game developed by High Voltage Software and published by D3 Publisher and Namco Bandai Games. It is based on the animated series Ben 10: Omniverse and is a sequel to the 2012 game. It was released in November 2013 for Nintendo 3DS, PlayStation 3, Wii, Wii U, and Xbox 360. The game follows Ben Tennyson, which is on a mission to save the planet from Incurseans, an alien race of amphibian-like creatures that are willing to conquer Earth.

The game received negative reviews, being criticized due to its graphics, level design, slow pacing, and a repetitive gameplay loop that "grows old" fast.

== Gameplay ==
Ben 10: Omniverse 2 alternates between two styles of gameplay throughout its campaign: beat 'em up and auto runner sections. The principal focus of the game are the beat 'em up sections, in which Ben Tennyson has 10 aliens to choose from, each of them has different abilities that can be used during the game for beating specific obstacles and puzzles. The auto runner sections have the player runs through various levels and combats against incurseans, during its six levels.

The game lets the player rapidly change between various alien forms, adapting their combat techniques. The 3DS version of the game is a side-scrolling video game while alternating the beat 'em up elements of its console version, along with having a total of 16 aliens.

== Plot ==
The plot is based on the third season of Ben 10: Omniverse, following Ben Tennyson—who has the ability to transform into various aliens, each of them with various different powers—on a mission to save Earth from Incurseans.

== Development and release ==
Ben 10: Omniverse 2 was developed by High Voltage Software for the PlayStation 3, Wii, Wii U, and Xbox 360, and by 1st Playable Productions for the Nintendo 3DS. D3 Publisher published the game in North America on November 5, 2013, while Namco Bandai Games published it in Europe on November 22.

== Reception ==
Reception

Aggregate score
Aggregator	Score
Metacritic	(PS3) 33/100

Review score
Publication	Score
Nintendo Life	(3DS) 4/10 (Wii U) 3/10

The game received "generally unfavorable" reviews for the PlayStation 3, according to the review aggregator website Metacritic, with an average score of 33 out of 100 based on four reviews. Everyeye's Lorenzo Fazio said that the plot failed to have presence in the game and that for the brand's legacy it felt "quite foolish", and that for the younger audiences it was uninteresting. He found the gameplay repetitive, specifically the arenas that consisted of only button mashing, and criticized the graphics. He ended the review saying, "If you really want to do something bad to someone during this Christmas, give them Ben 10 Omniverse 2."

Nintendo Life stated that the Wii U version had a very unpolished presentation along with a unintuitive gameplay and a story that is hard to understand for anyone who is not a fan of the series, and that was not recommended for fans, and for those who wanted to try the game, it was more recommended to play the 3DS version.
