= Matt Hazard: Blood Bath and Beyond =

2010 video game

- Developer(s): Vicious Cycle Software
- Publisher(s): D3 Publisher
- Producer(s): Christopher Puente
- Designer(s): Jimi Doss
- Artist(s): Alden Filion
- Writer(s): David Ellis
- Composer(s): Rod Abernethy
- Platform(s): PlayStation 3, Xbox 360
- Release: Xbox Live Arcade: NA: January 6, 2010; JP: February 17, 2010; PlayStation Network: NA: January 7, 2010; JP: February 18, 2010
- Genre(s): Shooter

Matt Hazard: Blood Bath and Beyond is a downloadable video game for the PlayStation Network and Xbox Live Arcade. It is a sequel to Eat Lead: The Return of Matt Hazard.

== Plot ==
Matt Hazard, the protagonist from the previous game, goes back in time and revisits his earlier games to prevent an evil corporation called Marathon MegaCorp from destroying him.

== Gameplay ==
Unlike its predecessor which was a 3D third person shooter, this game is a 2D side-scroller in order to evoke the feel of a retro game, however, the game developers make use of 3D graphics. The player has the ability to use upgraded weapons with limited ammo. Players also are able to use shoulder buttons to enter precision aim mode. Levels contain boxes allowing the player to power up. The game features three difficulty modes: Wussy, Damn This is Hard, and Fuck This Shit, the most difficult mode, in which enemies are able to kill players in just one hit. The game also contains a two player co-op mode, in which the second player controls Hazard's partner Dexter Dare. Weapons available to the player include flamethrowers, shotguns, grenades, plasma rifles and ice guns. The player is also able to deflect missiles the enemy fires at them by shooting at them. The game also features a large amount of graphic violence, unlike its predecessor.

== Release and Reception ==
Reception

Aggregate score
Aggregator	Score
Metacritic	PS3: 65/100

On Metacritic it has a score of 65.

In 2017, the game was released for Xbox One backwards compatibility.
