= Ben 10: Omniverse (video game) =

2012 video game

- Developers: Vicious Cycle Software; 1st Playable Productions (DS and 3DS)
- Publishers: NA: D3 Publisher; EU/AU: Namco Bandai Games
- Writers: Charlotte Fullerton; Dave Ellis
- Composer: Rod Abernethy
- Series: Ben 10
- Engine: Vicious Engine 2
- Platforms: PlayStation 3; Xbox 360; Wii; Wii U; Nintendo DS; Nintendo 3DS
- Release: NA: November 13, 2012; EU: November 30, 2012; AU: November 30, 2012; Wii U: NA: November 18, 2012; EU: November 30, 2012; AU: November 30, 2012
- Genres: Action; Beat 'em up
- Modes: Single-player, multiplayer

Ben 10: Omniverse is an action video game based on the American animated series of the same name. The game was developed by Vicious Cycle Software and published by D3 Publisher in North America and Namco Bandai Games in Europe and Australia. It was released in November 2012 for PlayStation 3, Xbox 360, Nintendo DS, Nintendo 3DS, Wii, and Wii U.

The game was praised for its graphics but was criticized for its lack of difficulty and of changes in gameplay. It is also available for digital download from the Nintendo eShop on the Wii U, the PlayStation Store for PS3 and Xbox Live Arcade for Xbox 360 in North America and Europe on December 11, 2012. A sequel, titled Ben 10: Omniverse 2, was released in November 2013.

== Gameplay ==
Ben 10: Omniverse is a multiplayer game that takes similarities with Ben 10: Protector of Earth and Ben 10: Alien Force. The first player takes the role of Ben Tennyson, which shifts of his teen and younger versions, while the second player takes the role of Rook Blonko, Ben's partner. Players as Ben can access 13 of his alien forms, but they can only transform on 4 of them, where they can change this every time, while players as Rook are equipped with a Proto-Tool, which transforms into different weapons that can be used in combat. They must solve a variety of puzzles and defeating waves of enemies with their respective abilities to continue advancing through the levels. The players can also interact with certain items, which can be opened or dragged.

Players have a health bar, which is indicated by a yellow line that depletes if they are attacked by enemies or enter in contact with other types of danger, an Omnitrix/Proto-Tool power, which indicates the remaining power of Ben's Omnitrix and Rook's Proto-Tool which, if run out, the player will be unable to transform or to use a weapon until it recharges, and an experience bar, which is indicated by a red bar that indicates the player's total experience they can use to upgrade Ben's aliens and Rook's Proto-Tool varieties, unlocking new special combos. They can be restored by collecting special orbs known as "Pick-Ups" that are depleted by enemies after being defeated, by breaking objects or by accessing secret areas. Players also can save their progress by interacting with save points through the level. In the Co-Op mode, if a player dies or are too far away from the other player for too much time, they will respawn after some seconds.

Boss battles contain quick-time events where players must press a sequence of buttons when the bosses become weak, but if they miss, the boss will react to the attack, and the player will need to try again. At the Extras section of the game, players can use cheats to unlock new features by combining a specific sequence of five aliens and characters.

== Plot ==
When a change in 16-year-old Ben's Completed Omnitrix goes wrong, his new partner, Rook, is sent back in time, finding Ben from when he was 11-year-old. Young Ben and Rook get into a fight with Malware, who absorbs Rook's Proto-Tool and gains new, much stronger abilities, leading to a terrible alternative future timeline.

Both 11-year-old Ben and 16-year-old Ben need to work together with his new partner Rook to solve the crime, fix the past and present, and defeat Malware.

== Reception ==
Ben 10: Omniverse

Aggregate score
Aggregator	Score
Metacritic	50/100 (PS3); 43/100 (Wii U)

Review scores
Publication	Score
Nintendo Life	4/10 (Wii U)
Nintendo World Report	4.5/10 (Wii U)

== Sequel ==
Omniverse also spawned a second video game, Ben 10: Omniverse 2 which was developed by High Voltage Software for the Wii U, Wii, PlayStation 3, and Xbox 360 and by 1st Playable Productions for the Nintendo 3DS. This game takes place during the events of the episode "The Frogs of War", where Ben must fight the Incurseans to get back to Earth and stop Emperor Milleous, Attea, Dr. Psychobos, and the Way Bads.
