= Dragonblade =

Dragonblade, Dragon-Blade, Dragon Blade, or variants thereof, may refer to:

Film

- DragonBlade: The Legend of Lang, a 2005 Hong Kong animated film
- Dragon Blade (film), a 2015 Chinese film starring Jackie Chan

Literature

- Dragon Blade: The Book of the Rowan, a 2005 Oak, Yew, Ash, Rowan novel by Sasha Miller and Andre Norton
- Dragonblade (Age of Fire), the name of two fictional characters

Other

- Dragon Blade: Wrath of Fire, a 2007 video game
- Task Force Dragon Blade, a military unit

== See also ==
- Dark Dragon Blade, an item from the video game franchise Ninja Gaiden
- Naruto Shippuden: Dragon Blade Chronicles (2009 video game), Wii game
- Green Dragon Crescent Blade, Guan Yu's guandao sword from Romance of the Three Kingdoms also called the "Holy Dragon Blade"
