= Kung Fu Panda: Showdown of Legendary Legends =

2015 video game

- North American cover art
- Developer: Vicious Cycle Software
- Publisher: Little Orbit
- Producer: DreamWorks Animation
- Series: Kung Fu Panda
- Platforms: PlayStation 4, PlayStation 3, Xbox One, Xbox 360, Wii U, Windows, Nintendo 3DS
- Release: EU: November 27, 2015; NA: December 1, 2015; Wii U December 15, 2015
- Genre: Fighting
- Modes: Single-player, multiplayer

Kung Fu Panda: Showdown of Legendary Legends is a 2015 platform fighting game developed by Vicious Cycle Software and published by Little Orbit for PlayStation 4, PlayStation 3, Xbox One, Xbox 360, Wii U, Nintendo 3DS, and Windows. It is based on the Kung Fu Panda franchise by DreamWorks Animation. Conrad Vernon, Steele Gagnon, Sumalee Montano, James Hong and Randall Duk Kim reprise their roles from the film series. Mick Wingert, Amir Talai, Max Koch and James Sie reprise their roles from the video game franchise and TV series. Fred Tatasciore reprises his roles from film series, video game franchise and TV series.

It was the last licensed game to be released by Little Orbit as the company announced in May 2018 that it was moving away from licensed games in order to focus on creating original works. The game was removed from digital storefronts on January 1, 2019 due to the expiration of Little Orbit's Kung Fu Panda license.

== Gameplay ==
Kung Fu Panda: Showdown of Legendary Legends is a platform fighter similar to that of Nintendo's Super Smash Bros. It features characters across the first three films including Po, the "Furious Five" and all the villains.

== Reception ==
Kung Fu Panda: Showdown of Legendary Legends received "mixed or average" reviews from critics. The Xbox One version has a score of 68 out of 100 on Metacritic based on four critics.
