= Despicable Me: The Game =

- North American cover art
- Developers: Vicious Cycle Software (Note: As Monkey Bar Games); Wayforward Technologies (DS)
- Publishers: NA: D3 Publisher; EU: Namco Bandai Games
- Directors: Pierre Coffin; Chris Renaud
- Producers: Chris Meledandri; John Cohen; Janet Healy
- Series: Despicable Me
- Engine: Vicious Engine 2
- Platforms: PlayStation 2 PlayStation Portable; Wii; Nintendo DS
- Release: PlayStation 2: NA: July 6, 2010; AU: September 2, 2010; EU: September 24, 2010; PSP, Wii, DS: NA: July 6, 2010; AU: September 2, 2010; EU: October 8, 2010
- Genre: Platformer
- Mode: Single-player

Despicable Me: The Game (also known as Despicable Me: The Game – Minion Mayhem on Nintendo DS) is a platform video game developed by Vicious Cycle Software, published by D3 Publisher, and produced by Universal Pictures released for the PlayStation 2, PlayStation Portable, and Wii. It is based on the 2010 Illumination animated film of the same name. The game runs on Vicious Engine 2.

The game was later released for Nintendo DS under the name Despicable Me: The Game - Minion Mayhem. Namco also released on July 6, 2010, another separate game for the iPhone, iPad and iPod Touch platform entitled Despicable Me: Minion Mania, developed by Anino Games. The game was removed from the App Store on January 1, 2013.

== Gameplay ==
Despicable Me: The Game is a platform video game. The player controls Minions, sending them around levels to activate elements to traverse the level. One specific Minion is the only one which can complete the level by retrieving a specific object, and other minions have special abilities that can aid in this task. The game contains thirty levels, grouped into six worlds.

== Reception ==
Reception

Aggregate score
Aggregator	Score
Metacritic	Wii: 55/100; NDS: 54/100

Review scores
Publication	Score
Eurogamer	6/10
Nintendo Life	5/10
Nintendo Power	Wii: 4/10; NDS: 7/10
The Guardian	2/5

Despicable Me: The Game – Minion Mayhem on Nintendo DS received "mixed or average" reviews according to review aggregator Metacritic.

Eurogamer contrasted the game with other video game adaptations of films, describing it as pleasant and contending that it used the capabilities of the DS well, while avoiding the pitfalls of other adaptations of reproducing the animated sequences from the film.

The Guardian described the game as challenging, if sloppy, praising the gameplay and the developers' use of the Despicable Me, license, but criticizing the game's difficulty and poor controls.

Nintendo Life said the game "commits no crime besides being very average", finding that the game had "spots of fun" despite generally criticizing the game and varying difficulty.
