= Dora the Explorer: Journey to the Purple Planet =

2005 video game

- North American PlayStation 2 box art
- Developer: Vicious Cycle Software (Note: As Monkey Bar Games)
- Publisher: Global Star Software
- Composer: Jason Graves
- Engine: Vicious Engine
- Platforms: GameCube; PlayStation 2
- Release: GameCube: NA: October 13, 2005; PAL: December 16, 2005; PlayStation 2: PAL: December 2, 2005; NA: February 9, 2006
- Genre: Action-adventure
- Mode: Single-player

Dora the Explorer: Journey to the Purple Planet is a 2005 action-adventure video game based on the television series Dora the Explorer, developed by Vicious Cycle Software and published by Global Star Software. The game was released for GameCube in North America on October 13, 2005, and later in the PAL regions on December 16, 2005. The PlayStation 2 version was released in PAL region on December 2, 2005, and later in North America on February 9, 2006. Based on an episode from the show, the game is about Dora and Boots finding lost aliens from a Saturn-like planet known as the Purple Planet. To take them home, Dora and Boots are required to collect keys to open a space gate leading to the Purple Planet. To fuel their rocket ship, Dora and Boots need to collect 10 space gems at each level.

== Plot ==
When Dora and Boots are looking up at outer space, a flying saucer containing five aliens (Flinky, Inky, Plinky, Dinky, and Al) from the Purple Planet lands on Earth. However, the saucer falls apart, and Dora and Boots have to get the aliens back to the Purple Planet. Isa has a rocket ship that Dora and Boots can borrow, which is located on top of the Tall Mountain. To get there, Dora and Boots first need to cross the Turtle River, get past the Icky Sticky Sand, swing over Crocodile Lake, and climb up to the top of the mountain. When they reach the top of the mountain, Dora and Boots launch themselves into outer space. When Dora and Boots get to the Purple Planet, they receive a present from the aliens to fly back to Earth.

== Gameplay ==
The player controls Dora the Explorer, followed by Boots. In gameplay, players collect gems, so Isa's rocket ship can fly to where gems are hidden in treasure. Later in the game, gems are also hidden in logs. If players collect 10 or more gems, Isa's rocket ship will fly. Players also jump on mushrooms and springboards to jump higher.

Before players cross Turtle River, Dora and Boots have to find all four turtles. When crossing Turtle River, players have to jump on all the turtles at the right time to cross the river. Later in the game, players cannot land on the Icky Sticky Sand. Otherwise, Dora gets stuck in the sand. Players then have to get Dinky out of the sand by pressing the A Button. At Crocodile Lake, players have to swing on vines by pressing the action button to get through the lake. When the player gets to the tall mountain, players then put the gems in the rocket and are launched into space, and players have to get all the keys from all the different planets to get to the purple planet to complete the game.

== Development ==
The game was not announced by any publication, nor at any gaming expo. The PlayStation 2 version was the first game on that platform to receive an EC+ rating from the ESRB.

== Reception ==
The PS2 version received mixed to positive reviews. IGN's Chris Roper gave the game a 7.0/10. Chris stated "Dora the Explorer: Journey to the Purple Planet can be a fun adventure for young children who are learning their first school-related skills, like how to count, pick out colors, etc." but criticized that "it doesn't actually teach in any way, it lacks an autosave and there might be a confusing section or two."
