= Eat Lead: The Return of Matt Hazard =

2009 video game

- Developer: Vicious Cycle Software
- Publisher: D3 Publisher
- Producer: Bryan West
- Designer: David Ellis
- Programmer: Allan Campbell
- Artist: Alden Filion
- Writer: David Ellis
- Composers: Rod Abernethy; Tony Morales
- Engine: Vicious Engine 2
- Platforms: PlayStation 3, Xbox 360
- Release: NA: March 3, 2009; EU: March 6, 2009; AU: March 26, 2009
- Genre: Third-person shooter
- Mode: Single-player

Eat Lead: The Return of Matt Hazard is a 2009 third-person shooter video game for the Xbox 360 and PlayStation 3 video game consoles. The game was developed by Vicious Cycle Software and published by D3 Publisher.

Eat Lead puts players in the role of the title character, a "legendary" gaming hero who is "returning to glory" in a new video game, some 25 years after his debut game and 6 years after his last game. In reality, the Matt Hazard character is in his first video game, with a history made up by D3 Publisher to chronicle the character's rise and fall in popularity. The Return of Matt Hazard marks Hazard's fictitious "comeback" to the gaming scene. Hazard is voiced by Will Arnett, while Neil Patrick Harris voices his nemesis Wallace "Wally" Wellesley.

The game itself is a parody of action-gaming clichés. The October 2008 debut trailer was done as a Behind the Music spoof called Inside the Game complete with Jim Forbes narration. It chronicles Matt Hazard's successes and hardships, and mirrors the progression of the Duke Nukem series of games, from early 8-bit to modern consoles.

The cast of Eat Lead received a nomination in the 2009 Spike Video Game Awards, under the category for "Best Cast", and won the award for "Best Comedy Game".

== Gameplay ==
Eat Lead is a third-person shooter where the player takes the role of satirical video game character Matt Hazard, implementing an over-the-shoulder camera perspective with combat emphasizing a duck-and-cover system using walls and other objects in the game's environment, in a similar fashion to Gears of War. Much of the scenery provides only temporary cover as after a certain amount of damage, it will glitch and be "edited out" of the game, leaving a tear in the level. While in cover, Matt can target and automatically run towards another piece of cover instead of moving manually.

Matt can only carry two weapons at once from a continually changing selection, due to the repeated manipulation of the game's environment and level switching. As the game progresses, weapon upgrades are made available that can be applied for temporary effects such as bullets that can freeze enemies. These upgrades can be used again after a meter is filled by defeating a number of enemies. If close enough to an enemy, a string of close combat strikes can be performed.

Some boss encounters will switch gameplay to an interactive cinematic where Matt must dodge and counter boss attacks through a quick time event system requiring certain buttons to be pressed or tapped when promoted on screen.

== Plot ==
Matt Hazard, a legendary video game character with over 25 years of video games to his credit, is attempting a "comeback" of sorts in a new game on next-generation consoles. In the introduction, Matt explains the history of his games, revealing that he accidentally caused his own downfall by taking his name into other genres, resulting in him ruining his reputation by putting himself in kid-friendly games. The game that he is currently starring in has him as a private detective seeking to return money stolen by a mob boss.

The first level starts at a Japanese steakhouse where halfway through the level, he encounters Sonny Tang, who is promptly defeated. At one point of the level, the game is altered introducing Matt to Sting Sniperscope (a parody of Arnold Schwarzenegger), who attempts to kill a weaponless Matt. In mid shot the game literally pauses and a voice known as QA informs him that she hacked the code to pause the game due to Matt's saves being removed, Sniperscope intending to replace Matt in a Metal Gear Solid 2 style twist. She tells Matt to finish off Sniperscope and upon exiting the level and moving to a part of the server, QA restores Matt's saves and trademark clothing. QA informs Matt that he was originally supposed to die but with Sniperscope gone, Matt has to continue the game in his place.

The second level occurs in a dance club where characters from Matt's western game, A Fistfull of Hazard, and Russian terrorists from You'll Only Die Once are hacked into the game. Revealing one of Matt's friends as the owner who escapes from the level. The level turns into a Soviet Missile base where he defeats his Russian nemesis. In reality, the "comeback" game is being staged by Wallace Wellesley, the CEO of the game company, Marathon Megasoft, who grew to hate Matt Hazard through the difficulty of his games, who has complete control over the game world and manipulates the game world seemingly at will, similar to the classic Warner Bros. animated cartoon Duck Amuck. Wellesley also reveals that his father is the owner of a game store franchise, a parody of EB Games. The reason the game was made was due to Matt's contract with the game company where he cannot quit or be fired unless killed in a game.

The third level takes place in a warehouse where Matt has to rescue one of his friends, a level 75 RPG character named Bill the Wizard, via mounted sniper rifle. Enemies from one of his gaming flops called Soak'Em are hacked into the game equipped with waterguns now capable of damaging Matt. Upon rescuing Bill and defeating version 2 of Sniperscope, Wellesley is advised by his assistant to put Matt's friends into the game as bait to lure him. QA takes Matt to his game partner Dexter's (a little parody of Daxter from Jak and Daxter series) mansion where zombies are introduced. Matt reaches Dexter to warn him about Wellesley's plot only for Dexter to betray him, revealing to Matt that he is working for Wallace, who promised him his own starring role in a game. He sends a group of female androids to kill Hazard. Despite this, Matt saves Dexter from death when one of his androids turn on him. Matt proceeds to the beginning of the level, but QA is unable to create a level exit due to interference while dozens of zombies close into Matt's position. Suddenly QA saves Matt but acts differently than she normally does and takes Matt to the next level.

While on a cruise liner which serves as the current level, Matt is attacked by space marines while saving Master Chef. At the end of the level, there is an Evil Twin scene with two QAs. Matt is not fooled or confused when each claims the other is the impostor, knowing the red is the fake as she has provided no help, directed him into constant ambushes, and because she flirted with him. Matt then defeats the next boss, a giant tentacle beast.

Matt proceeds to the next level, a warehouse for items used in all videogames where he finds Altos Tratus, another game character. The boss is a parody of Japanese RPG protagonists (specifically Cloud Strife) who speaks entirely through textboxes that require Matt to press a button to continue. The enemies used by Wellesley stole most of the items in the warehouse that are used in the "final" level of the SniperScope Game which takes place on the docks where Matt and QA are confident that beating the level will end the game, which QA adds if Wellesley will let Matt get out of the game.

After making it through the docks and defeating (finishing) Sting Sniperscope for a third time the game employs a false ending, after which Matt suddenly gets transported to a virtual Marathon Megasoft company headquarters. After fighting his way through to the top floor, Matt encounters Wally and he kills QA. Despite this, Matt still defeats Wally (With the help of a remorseful Dexter) and the company is now run by Quentin A. Myers, the lead programmer for some of Matt's early games and the person who controlled QA, stating that he ensured that he would claim ownership after Wellesley was arrested. He continues by saying that because he is now head of Marathon Megasoft, he now has control over what games the company releases, and decides he will bring back the classics and the game ends with Matt's famous catchphrase.

The post credit scene shows Wellesley now reduced to a videogame shopkeeper of his father's company Zapp's Games still harboring a grudge against Matt Hazard, angered upon seeing the newest game release, which is the game that the player went through.

== Development ==
In September 2008, a pair of websites appeared. The blog, "The Real Matt Hazard", as well as the website "Weapons of Matt Destruction", served as a viral marketing campaign to promote the game. Each would serve to establish Matt Hazard and his fictional video games as major influences that have shaped video gaming into what we see today. For example, a blog post identifies Matt's first arcade game, 1983's The Adventures of Matt in Hazard Land, as "the original 8-bit side-scroller", while other Hazard games are responsible for such gaming events and annoyances as "the Steamy Coffee Controversy", the ability to jump in a game, and longer development cycles. They also established the series' fictional developer, Marathon Software. Matt Hazard was "resurrected" by D3 Publisher when they announced the newest game in the Matt Hazard series, Eat Lead.

On October 3, 2008, Eat Lead was officially announced, alongside a third Matt Hazard website, "Matt Hazard :: The unofficially OFFICIAL guide to the world's greatest game hero ever created!!!". The site details the history of ten of Hazard's games, which all focus on a different gaming stereotype or parody other similar games of the era.

A trailer was released for Eat Lead alongside the announcement. In the trailer, a modern Hazard sits down for a Behind the Music-style interview (complete with voiceover from Behind the Music's Jim Forbes) in which Hazard and other characters (themselves clichés of the "old-school bad guy" and the "mandatory hot chick") reminisce about Hazard's rise in popularity as his polygon and pixel count grew, up until his fall when he was put into "kiddy games". The trailer concludes with Matt stating that he doesn't give up that easily and that he's making a comeback.

Game Informer notes that Will Arnett voices Matt Hazard, while Neil Patrick Harris portrays Marathon executive Wallace "Wally" Wellesley. The magazine adds further that "characters like Captain Carpenter and Master Chef are more overt references to specific franchises."

== Marketing and promotion ==
The January 2009 issue of PlayStation: The Official Magazine features an "interview" with the titular character.

== Parodies in Matt Hazard ==
The game includes many parodies in its dialogue, settings, and characters. This process of parodying action games and other genres is greatly assisted by the fact that Matt Hazard is capable of breaking the fourth wall. The parodies include references to long elevator waits as a mask for game loading, text scrolling RPGs, tutorials, various action games, Mario Bros., Duke Nukem, Dungeons & Dragons, Bugs Bunny, evil twins, Halo's Master Chief, Wolfenstein 3D, Red Steel, Mortal Kombat, Arnold Schwarzenegger, Resident Evil, and more.

== Reception ==
Reception

Aggregate scores
Aggregator	Score
GameRankings	(X360) 54% (PS3) 55%
Metacritic	(X360) 53/100 (PS3) 51/100

Review scores
Publication	Score
GameSpot	6/10
IGN	5.2/10

Eat Lead: The Return of Matt Hazard has received mixed reviews and has an aggregate score of 52 on Metacritic. Most reviewers praised the game's humor, but panned its gameplay. IGN gave the game a 5.2/10, and said "you march into a room, take cover, shoot everything, a door opens, and you move to the next room to perform everything all over again." GameSpot gave the game a 6/10 praising the "clever video game parody" and "awesome music", but criticized the "derivative level design" and "cheap enemy placement".

== Sequel ==
A sequel, entitled Matt Hazard: Blood Bath and Beyond, was released for the PlayStation Network and Xbox Live Arcade.
