= Signal (video game) =

2009 video game

- Standard edition cover of Signal
- Developer(s): Studio Altair
- Publisher(s): D3 Publisher
- Platform(s): Nintendo DS
- Release: JP: December 3, 2009
- Genre(s): Otome game
- Mode(s): Single player

Signal (stylized as SIGNAL) is an otome game released on December 3, 2009 by D3 Publisher for Nintendo DS, in both a standard and a limited edition. It is part of a series including the PlayStation 2 game Darling Special Backlash Koi no Exhaust Heat (Darling Special Backlash 恋のエキゾースト・ヒート), sequel to the PC game Darling. Its CERO rating is D (17+).
