= Dragon Blade: Wrath of Fire =

2007 video game

- Developer: Land Ho!
- Publisher: D3 Publisher
- Platform: Wii
- Release: NA: September 25, 2007; AU: November 2, 2007; EU: November 16, 2007; JP: November 22, 2007
- Genre: Action game
- Mode: Single player

Dragon Blade: Wrath of Fire, known in Japan as simply Dragon Blade (ドラゴンブレイド, Doragon Bureido), is a game for the Wii from Japanese developer Land Ho! publisher D3 Publisher. Dragon Blade follows a young adventurer named Dal who seeks six legendary pieces of the "Dragon Blade," each infused with the soul of different guardian dragons. In an attempt to build the ultimate weapon and vanquish evil, the young protagonist embarks on a quest to find and seal away each of the six dragons, taking their souls and abilities in the process.

== Plot ==
Long ago, the fire dragon Valthorian broke the great rule of his kind by interfering in the affairs of humanity, leading those with honor in triumph against evil and granting sovereignty to six noble men, appointing them as kings to rule the land. Angered by Valthorian's actions, his bretheren, led by the shadow dragon Vormanax, plotted against him, tricking the six kings with lies that Valthorian was responsible for the invasion of their world; one of the kings and Valthorian's trusted friend, Jandral, resisted, but ultimately fell to the dark whispers after being pressed by the other five men. Leading their armies against him, the six kings slew Valthorian, whose soul was sealed into the Dragon Blade, the fragments of which were split amongst themselves. Jandral, once again himself, fled Voarmanax with his piece, the hilt, to the village of Gamar; living as a farmer, he unsuccessfully attempted to release Valthorian from the blade, sealing the hilt away before dying. For generations, Valthorian, attempted to reach out in vain to Jandral's descendants while Vormanax and his bretheren ravaged the world, their followers transforming into monsters. Eventually, Valthorian was able to finally reach out to the last of Jandral's bloodline, a young man named Dal, communicating to him from his dreams and training him to wield the Dragon Blade.

Upon awakening from one such dream, Dal is greeted by his fiance, Seri, who dismisses his dreams as the result of stress regarding their upcoming wedding. Suddenly, the village falls under attack by monsters. After instructing Seri to run and hide, Dal is drawn to a large stone by Valthorian, where he is teleported to a cave containing the hilt of the Dragin Blade. Dal returns to the village, finding it burning; angered and empowered, he fights off the monsters, but finds a mortally wounded Seri, who dies in his arms. Saddened by her death, he wanders into the centre of the village, where he encounters the leaders of the attacking monsters. As it turns out, they had been searching for the Dragon Blade, which Dal now wields. Dal kills them, spending the rest of the day burying the dead. With everyone from his village gone, he sets out with the Dragon Blade, the piece containing Valthorian's mind, to slay the ones that destroyed his home and his love.

Passing through several lands, Dal regains portions of Valthorian's soul, which is won by slaying the five corrupted kings. The arms, tail, wings and head of Valthorian are recovered, as Dal slays each of the dragons. Upon reaching Vormanax, a great battle ensues, culminating in Valthorian's release and his slaying of Vormanax, trapping the shadow dragon's soul in the Dragon Blade to replace his own. After thanking Dal, Valthorian declares that his training complete and departs, entrusting Dal with ensuring that Vormanax does not escape from the Dragon Blade. However, Dal sees a vision in the sky of a still living Seri being held prisoner by a mysterious, shadowy figure. Valthorian realises that Vormanax was being guided by an even greater and darker force, and declares that is now up to Dal to stop this new threat.

== Gameplay ==
Picture of gameplay from Dragon Blade: Wrath of Fire

The game is a Hack and slash game, mixed with Beat 'em up and RPG aspects, similar to God of War and Devil May Cry.

In the game, the Wii remote is used as the weapon held by the main character. At first, it is a sword that can only slash and defend, but as players advance, they gain more weapon transformations. Confirmed usable weapon modes are a dragon fist, two dragon fists, a dragon head, dragon wings and a dragon tail. There are twenty levels in the game, and five worlds (four levels per world). To fight, players can lock on to enemies and either shoot fire with the dragon head or do various close combat techniques depending on which weapon is being used.

== Reception ==
Reception

Aggregate score
Aggregator	Score
Metacritic	51/100

Review scores
Publication	Score
1Up.com	D+
Famitsu	25/40
GamePro	3.25/5
GameSpot	4/10
GameSpy	2.5/5
GameTrailers	4.6/10
GameZone	6.2/10
IGN	5.6/10
NGamer	50%
Official Nintendo Magazine	51%

The game received "mixed" reviews according to the review aggregation website Metacritic. In Japan, Famitsu gave it a score of one seven and three sixes for a total of 25 out of 40.
