= Ben 10: Galactic Racing =

2011 video game

- North American Nintendo 3DS version cover art
- Developers: Vicious Cycle Software (Note: As Monkey Bar Games); Tantalus Media (DS)
- Publishers: NA: D3 Publisher; EU: Namco Bandai Games
- Series: Ben 10
- Platforms: PlayStation 3, Xbox 360, Wii, PlayStation Vita, Nintendo 3DS, Nintendo DS
- Release: PS3, Wii, X360, DS: NA: October 18, 2011; EU: November 25, 2011; 3DS: NA: October 18, 2011; EU: March 16, 2012; PS Vita: NA: February 22, 2012; EU: March 16, 2012
- Genre: Racing game
- Modes: Single-player, multiplayer

Ben 10: Galactic Racing is a racing video game in the Ben 10 series developed by Vicious Cycle Software and published by D3 Publisher in North America and Namco Bandai Games in Europe for the PlayStation 3, Xbox 360, Wii, Nintendo DS, PlayStation Vita, and Nintendo 3DS. It was released in North America on October 18, 2011, and on November 25, 2011, in Europe, for the Wii, PlayStation 3, Xbox 360, Nintendo DS, and Nintendo 3DS, with the latter version releasing in Europe on March 16, 2012. The PlayStation Vita port of Ben 10: Galactic Racing was released on February 22, 2012, in North America and March 16, 2012, in Europe. It was announced at Electronic Entertainment Expo 2011 on June 7, 2011.

== Gameplay ==
Galactic Racing's gameplay is similar to Nintendo's Mario Kart franchise, with characters racing through various race circuits based on different places across the Ben 10 franchise, and collecting power-ups (called Omni-Nodes) to boost their speed or hamper their opponents. The game features several modes, including: The Galactic Grand Prix (racing in several multi-tracks to unlock characters and win trophies), Short Circuit (racing on a custom prix consisting of three tracks), Single Race (racing on any track), Time Trials (beat times set by players and where players unlock karts), Showdown (three bonus games consisting of Ultimate Alienation, Omni-Tag and Ultimate Elimination) and Multiplayer (a mode that includes up to four players who race against each other).

While players can enable Ben's alien forms in mid-race, other characters such as Kevin Levin can utilize their unique special abilities to affect the outcome of a race. All playable characters can pick up special Omni-Node Power-Ups with many different types of alien-based abilities, including a special Ultimate move that unleashes a super boost of speed and power. Races are held in Galactic Grand Prix circuits, and players can set record-breaking time scores that can be set in Time Trials mode. A new alien, Fasttrack, made his video game debut on every platform and one of Ben's original aliens, Diamondhead was made exclusively available on the Nintendo DS version.

== Reception ==
Ben 10: Galactic Racing received mixed reviews from critics.
