= Vicious Cycle Software =

Defunct American video game developer

- Company type: Subsidiary
- Industry: Video games
- Founded: 2000; 26 years ago in Chapel Hill, North Carolina, U.S.
- Defunct: January 31, 2016; 10 years ago
- Headquarters: Morrisville, North Carolina, U.S.
- Key people: Eric Peterson, Founder/President and CEO; Wayne Harvey, Founder/VP/CTO; Dave Ellis, Founder/Senior Game Designer, Marc Racine Founder/Production Director, Senior Game Designer Brett Freese
- Products: Vicious Engine
- Parent: D3 Publisher (2007–2014); Little Orbit (2014–2016)
- Divisions: Monkey Bar Games
- Website: viciouscycleinc.com

Vicious Cycle Software was an American video game development company based in Morrisville, North Carolina.

== History ==
Vicious Cycle was founded in 2000 by Eric Peterson, Dave Ellis, Marc Racine, and Wayne Harvey after layoffs at the local MicroProse development studio (then a Hasbro Interactive studio) forced several game developers into finding other work. Racine resigned as Vice President and Director of Production in the Spring of 2005 to pursue other ventures. Ellis left the company in the Summer of 2000 but returned in 2005 to take a position as a game designer. Vicious Cycle has released titles for the PlayStation 2, Xbox, GameCube, Xbox 360, PlayStation 3, Wii, and PlayStation Portable systems as well as the Microsoft Windows platform.

On June 20, 2007, Vicious Cycle was acquired by D3 Publisher and became a fully-owned subsidiary of their D3 Publisher of America division, a second‐tier subsidiary of D3 Inc. Vicious Cycle released Eat Lead: The Return of Matt Hazard for Xbox 360 and PlayStation 3 on February 26, 2009. On October 1, 2009, they announced Matt Hazard: Blood Bath and Beyond for Xbox LIVE Arcade and the PlayStation Store for winter 2009.

On September 4, 2014, Vicious Cycle was acquired by Little Orbit. As the final two games (Adventure Time: Finn & Jake Investigations and Kung Fu Panda: Showdown of Legendary Legends) neared completion, several rounds of layoffs reduced the studio to a skeleton crew. Vicious Cycle closed its doors permanently on January 31, 2016.

== Technology ==
In 2005, Vicious Cycle announced the release of their Vicious Engine game engine. The Vicious Engine was a complete game development middleware solution for the PlayStation 2, PlayStation 3, Xbox, Xbox 360, PlayStation Portable, GameCube, Wii and Microsoft Windows. It was one of the first game engines to offer full support for the PSP and Wii platforms.

The second version of the Vicious Engine, V^{e2}, was released on March 25, 2009, at the Game Developers Conference. It specifically featured improvements for the Xbox 360 and PlayStation 3.

== Games ==
Year	Title	Platform(s)	Publisher(s)	Label
2002	Robotech: Battlecry	PlayStation 2, GameCube, Xbox	TDK Mediactive	Vicious Cycle
2003	Dinotopia: The Sunstone Odyssey	GameCube, Xbox	TDK Mediactive, Global Star Software	Vicious Cycle
2004	Robotech: Invasion	PlayStation 2, Xbox	Global Star Software	Vicious Cycle
2005	Spy vs. Spy	PlayStation 2, Xbox	Global Star Software	Vicious Cycle
2005	Dora the Explorer: Journey to the Purple Planet	PlayStation 2, GameCube	Global Star Software	Monkey Bar
2006	Curious George	PlayStation 2, GameCube, Xbox, Windows	Namco Hometek, Electronic Arts	Monkey Bar
2006	Flushed Away	PlayStation 2, GameCube	D3 Publisher	Monkey Bar
2007	Marvel Trading Card Game	PlayStation Portable, Windows	Konami	Vicious Cycle
2007	Puzzle Quest: Challenge of the Warlords	PlayStation Portable, Xbox 360	D3 Publisher	Vicious Cycle
2007	Dead Head Fred	PlayStation Portable	D3 Publisher	Vicious Cycle
2008	Ben 10: Alien Force	PlayStation 2, Wii, PlayStation Portable	D3 Publisher	Monkey Bar
2009	Eat Lead: The Return of Matt Hazard	PlayStation 3, Xbox 360	D3 Publisher	Vicious Cycle
2010	Matt Hazard: Blood Bath and Beyond	PlayStation 3, Xbox 360	D3 Publisher	Vicious Cycle
2010	Despicable Me: The Game	PlayStation 2, Wii, PlayStation Portable	D3 Publisher, Namco Bandai Games	Monkey Bar
2010	Yogi Bear: The Video Game	Wii	D3 Publisher, Namco Bandai Games	Monkey Bar
2011	Earth Defense Force: Insect Armageddon	PlayStation 3, Xbox 360, Windows	D3 Publisher, Namco Bandai Games	Vicious Cycle
2011	Ben 10: Galactic Racing	PlayStation 3, Xbox 360, Wii, Nintendo 3DS	D3 Publisher, Namco Bandai Games	Monkey Bar
2012	Ben 10: Galactic Racing	PlayStation Vita	D3 Publisher, Namco Bandai Games	Monkey Bar
2012	Madagascar 3: The Video Game	PlayStation 3, Xbox 360, Wii	D3 Publisher, Namco Bandai Games	Monkey Bar
2012	Ben 10: Omniverse	PlayStation 3, Xbox 360, Wii, Wii U	D3 Publisher, Namco Bandai Games	Monkey Bar
2013	Turbo: Super Stunt Squad	PlayStation 3, Xbox 360, Wii, Wii U	D3 Publisher, Namco Bandai Games	Monkey Bar
2013	Pac-Man and the Ghostly Adventures	PlayStation 3, Xbox 360, Wii U	Namco Bandai Games	Monkey Bar
2014	Pac-Man and the Ghostly Adventures 2	PlayStation 3, Xbox 360, Wii U, Nintendo 3DS	Bandai Namco Games	Monkey Bar
2015	Adventure Time: Finn & Jake Investigations	PlayStation 3, PlayStation 4, Xbox 360, Xbox One, Wii U, Nintendo 3DS, Windows	Little Orbit	Vicious Cycle
2015	Kung Fu Panda: Showdown of Legendary Legends	PlayStation 3, PlayStation 4, Xbox 360, Xbox One, Wii U, Nintendo 3DS, Windows	Little Orbit	Vicious Cycle

== Monkey Bar Games ==
Monkey Bar Games
- Company type: Division
- Industry: Software and Programming
- Founded: 2005; 21 years ago
- Defunct: January 31, 2016; 10 years ago
- Headquarters: Chapel Hill, North Carolina, United States
- Parent: Vicious Cycle Software

Monkey Bar Games was the children's division of Vicious Cycle Software. The label was mainly associated with games based on licensed children's properties. Monkey Bar was formed in November 2005, with Dora the Explorer: Journey to the Purple Planet and Curious George being the first two titles released under the label.
