= Curious George (video game) =

2006 platform video game

- Developers: Vicious Cycle Software (Note: As Monkey Bar Games); Torus Games (Game Boy Advance)
- Publishers: NA: Namco Hometek; EU: Electronic Arts
- Composer: Jason Graves
- Engine: Vicious Engine
- Platforms: Xbox; GameCube; Game Boy Advance; PlayStation 2; Windows
- Release: NA: February 1, 2006; EU: December 1, 2006 (GBA, PS2); AU: December 14, 2006 (GBA); AU: December 14, 2007 (PS2)
- Genre: Platform
- Mode: Single-player

Curious George is a 2006 platform game developed by Vicious Cycle Software and published by Namco Hometek. It was released for the GameCube, PlayStation 2, Xbox, and Microsoft Windows, and is based on the 2006 film of the same name. A separate 2D version was developed for the Game Boy Advance (GBA) by Torus Games. Most of the animated film's original voices were not used in any of the in-game dialogue, except for the cutscenes, while Frank Welker and David Cross reprise their roles as Curious George and Junior respectively.

== Gameplay ==
Curious George is a platform game where the player controls George, (either a Barbary macaque or chimpanzee) who can jump, swing and slide around different environments. The game features 13 linear levels, which closely follow the plot of the film; each level also features cutscenes taken from the film. Each level features collectible bananas, with the main goal being to collect idols, which advance the player to the next part of the level. The player may also be tasked with finding hidden key objects in order to advance. The levels also feature a series of highlighted objects, which award the player "curious points" for interacting with them. These points can then be used to unlock bonus items, which include hats that George can wear in-game, and the ability to replay minigames and cutscenes.

The game features four minigames, three of which are fairly similar, requiring the player to press a button at the correct time. The first is a rhythm game featuring George dancing to a beat. The final minigame involves breaking balloons, with the player having to complete 18 rounds of the game to collect the tokens needed to complete the level.

== Plot ==
The game begins with Ted discovering an ancient idol in an African jungle, only to find it is three inches tall. He leaves the jungle in disappointment, giving George (voiced by Frank Welker) his yellow hat. George follows Ted through the jungle and on board a cargo ship, which serves as the setting for the next level. On board the cargo ship, George makes his way out of the cargo hold, where he is greeted by two sailors on deck. The sailors tell George to dance, which leads to the first dancing minigame. After the dance, the sailors challenge George to complete an obstacle course. George explores the rest of the ship before returning to the hold, where the level ends as the ship arrives at its destination.

Following Ted off the ship, George rides on the top of cars and follows Ted's cab through the city, before arriving at a construction site. Navigating through the construction site, George spots Ted entering his apartment building, and makes his way inside Ted's room by climbing the balconies. Upon his arrival, his scent attracts the attention of Ivan, the building's doorman, who enforces a "no pets" policy. George sneaks through the apartment to avoid Ivan, before entering the penthouse of Ms. Plushbottom, leading to the second minigame. George is then discovered and evicted from the apartment along with Ted.

The next level takes place at the museum where Ted works; he dodges questions regarding the size of the idol as George sneaks through the museum. Junior (voiced by David Cross), the son of the museum's owner, becomes suspicious after Ted repeatedly mentions a monkey, and sets out to find George. George's repeated antics eventually send a frustrated Junior home, but George and Ted are kicked out regardless after the monkey accidentally destroys an Apatosaurus skeleton. Left with nowhere to sleep, the duo take refuge in a park, where they find solace in the fireflies, which George collects.

The next day, George collects tokens in the final minigame by popping balloons with a group of children; he tries to buy a balloon with the tokens, but ends up taking the entire bunch and floating away, to Ted's horror. This leads to the next level, where George floats through the air, while dodging obstacles and collecting balloons to sustain himself. He eventually lands safely, only to be captured by animal control and sent back on a ship to Africa. Luckily, Ted rescues George aboard the ship, but then has his idol stolen by a rat. George chases the rat through the ship, and comforts a musophobic sailor through dance. On deck, the idol is swooped up by a seagull; George distracts the bird by offering up a stolen potato, and recovers the idol.

In the final two levels, George and Ted find themselves back in Africa, with Ted realizing the tiny idol was only the key to a larger one. Together, they navigate the various puzzles guarding the path to the idol, some of which prove to be dangerous. The game ends as George opens the entrance to the idol, with the final cutscene from the film showing Ted presenting the idol at the museum, and emphasizing the importance of curiosity on his journey with George.

== Production and release ==
The console and PC versions were developed by Monkey Bar Games, while the GBA version of the game was developed by Torus Games. The game was first announced in late 2005, and development of both the console and GBA versions were complete by January 2006.

Demos of the console version were revealed at a Namco press event shortly after the game's announcement, which showed an early version of the museum level. Much of the content described by reviewers made it into the final game. At the time, Namco wanted Will Ferrell to reprise his role as Ted from the film, but this did not come to fruition.

The game was released on February 1, 2006, nine days before the release of the film. Its release in PAL regions was scheduled for October 2006, after Electronic Arts reached an agreement with Namco to publish the game in the regions.

== Reception ==
Reception

Aggregate score
Aggregator	Score				
Aggregator	GBA	GameCube	PC	PS2	Xbox
Metacritic	65/100	57/100	58/100	53/100	59/100

Review scores
Publication	Score				
Publication	GBA	GameCube	PC	PS2	Xbox
Eurogamer	N/A	N/A	N/A	4/10	N/A
GamesMaster	N/A	N/A	N/A	45%	N/A
GameSpot	6.6/10	6/10	6/10	6/10	6/10
GameZone	N/A	N/A	6.5/10	N/A	N/A
IGN	N/A	5.5/10	N/A	5.5/10	5.5/10
NGamer	61%	N/A	N/A	N/A	N/A
Nintendo Power	7/10	7/10	N/A	N/A	N/A
PlayStation Official Magazine – UK	N/A	N/A	N/A	5/10	N/A
Official Xbox Magazine (US)	N/A	N/A	N/A	N/A	6/10
TeamXbox	N/A	N/A	N/A	N/A	5/10
The A.V. Club	N/A	C	C	C	C
Detroit Free Press	N/A	N/A	N/A	2/4	N/A

The game received "mixed or average reviews" on all platforms according to video game review aggregator Metacritic, with the GBA version getting the most praise.

The console version was praised for its cel-shaded graphics, which reviewers felt were able to capture the cartoon style of the film. While praising the graphics and animations, IGN criticized the game's main menu, calling it "bland" and "unfinished"; the reviewer was unsure whether he had the final version of the game or not until gameplay started.

Aspects of the gameplay were negatively received, such as the controls and the overall repetitiveness of the game. The stiff controls, particularly the double jump, and the hard to control camera, frustrated reviewers. While the levels were designed to be simple, critics felt the gameplay issues made parts of the game too complex for young children, the game's target audience. The platforming gameplay was otherwise described as lacking depth. A review for GameSpot described the level design as "extremely linear" and without "measure of exploration", and the interactive objects were described by Eurogamer as "a nice idea" but "pointless" due to their repetitiveness. The minigames received mixed reviews from reviewers; IGN called them a "much needed break" from the main game, while others found them too repetitive. Eurogamer characterized the final balloon minigame as "a staggering EIGHTEEN rounds of lethargic bemani action".
