= Ben 10: Alien Force (video game) =

2008 video game

- North American Wii cover art
- Developers: Vicious Cycle Software (Note: As Monkey Bar Games); 1st Playable Productions (Nintendo DS)
- Publisher: D3 Publisher
- Composers: Michael McCuistion; Lolita Ritmanis; Kristopher Carter
- Series: Ben 10: Alien Force
- Engine: Vicious Engine
- Platforms: Wii, PlayStation 2, PlayStation Portable, Nintendo DS
- Release: NA: October 28, 2008; AU: November 20, 2008; EU: February 16, 2009
- Genres: Action-adventure, platformer
- Modes: Single-player, multiplayer

Ben 10: Alien Force is an action-adventure video game developed by Vicious Cycle Software and published by D3 Publisher. It is based on the American animated television series of the same name. The game was released in North America on October 28, 2008, and in February 2009 in the United Kingdom.

== Plot ==
Ben Tennyson, his cousin Gwen and Kevin Levin encounter the Forever Knights looking for a piece of alien tech at a pier. They also meet an off-world Tetramand Plumber named Gorvan, who is searching for illegal alien tech, and recruits them to help him.

The trio retrieves components from various places, defeating the Forever Knights and Pickaxe Aliens that were guarding them. Gorvan grows increasingly suspicious with each component collected, and the trio decide to keep an eye on him. Eventually, they learn from Max Tennyson that Gorvan is a disgraced Plumber who was thrown out of the organization for hoarding and selling illegal alien technology. Kevin decides to hunt down Gorvan without backup, with Ben giving chase.

Kevin rushes into Gorvan's hideout, discovering that he has been hoarding alien technology at the behest of an unknown customer. Gorvan releases Xenocites, who attack Kevin. After catching up with Kevin, Ben finds him partially transformed into a DNAlien. Ben defeats Kevin and turns him back to normal with the Omnitrix's DNA Repair function, sending him back to Gwen. Ben then finds and defeats Gorvan. He returns to Gwen and Kevin, and they discover that Gorvan was gathering components for a Highbreed, who proceeds to steal a component, and energy source, from them.

They track the Highbreed, who has used the components to build a Highbreed weather tower, which they intend to use to make Earth hospitable to them, in a process which would be fatal for humanity. The team is attacked by a swarm of DNAliens, forcing them to split up. While attempting to shut down the tower, Ben accidentally activates it. Gwen and Kevin disable the tower's forcefields, allowing Ben to destroy the tower.

== Reception ==
Reception

Aggregate score
Aggregator	Score
Metacritic	(WII) 45/100

Review score
Publication	Score
IGN	4/10

Ben 10: Alien Force received "generally unfavorable" reviews for review aggregator Metacritic.
