= Rod Abernethy =

American guitarist, songwriter, and composer

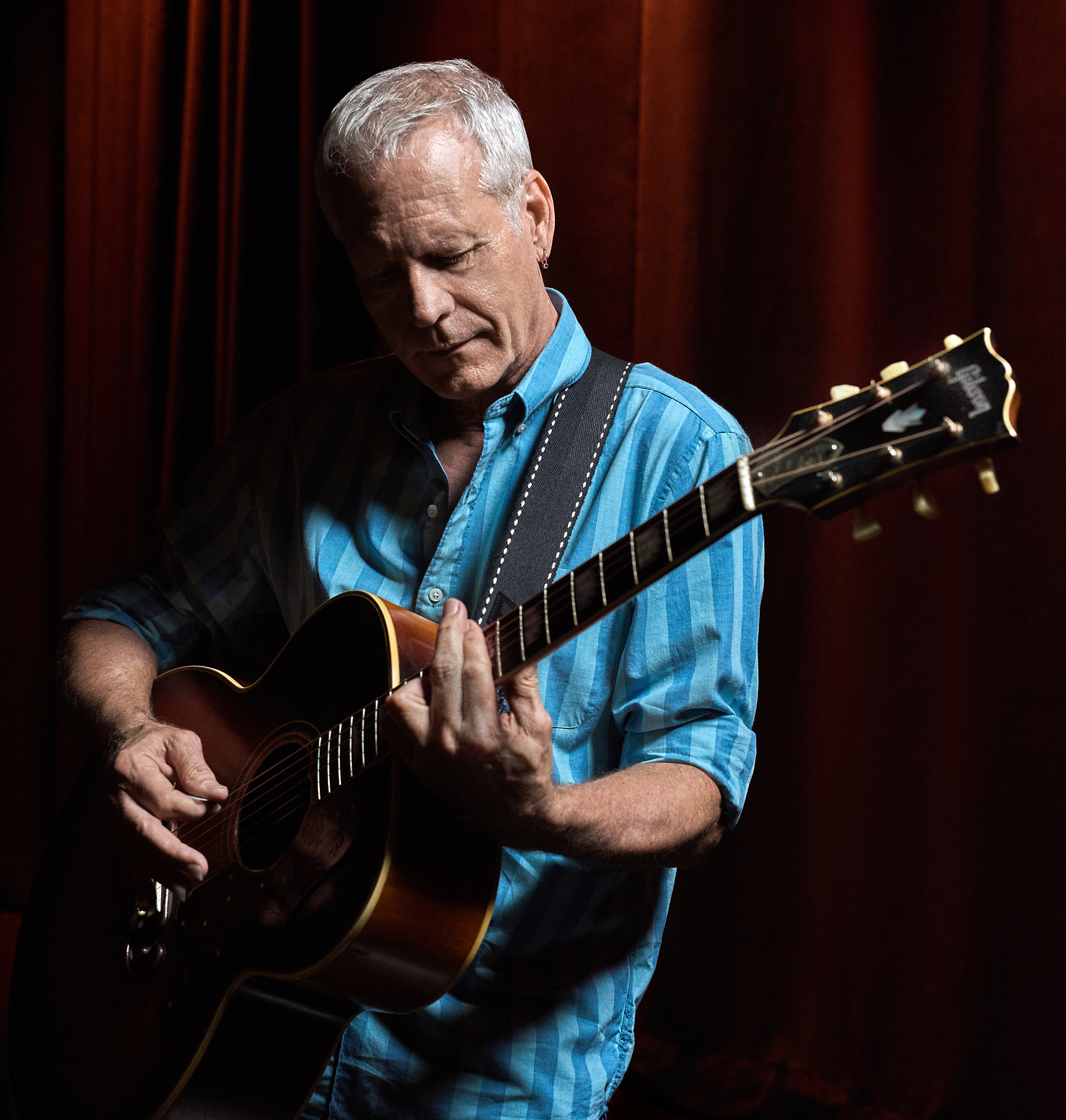
- Abernethy performing live in Raleigh, NC

Background information
- Genres: Acoustic; folk; video game music
- Occupations: Songwriter; guitarist; composer
- Instruments: Guitar; vocals
- Years active: 1975–present
- Member of: Arrogance
- Website: rodabernethyguitar.com

Rod Abernethy is a performing songwriter, guitarist, and composer. His music has been used as scores for EA, Midway, Vivendi, Universal, Sony, Ubisoft, Bethesda, Paramount, Disney, THQ, Activision, Konami, Majesco, NC Soft, Namco and Nintendo.

Abernethy first appeared on the public landscape with a 1975 LP Solo, produced by Don Dixon from the North Carolina band Arrogance. He later joined Arrogance as lead guitarist, staying with the band through their releases Suddenly (Warner Brothers,1980) and Lively (1981). He eventually left Arrogance before the recording of the unreleased, at the time, The 5'11" Record (1982) to pursue a solo music career composing for films, TV, and video games.

As a composer, Abernethy has more than 80 video games to his credit, including id Software's RAGE, TERA, EA’s science fiction survival horror opus Dead Space (2009 BAFTA for Use of Audio - Music Co-Producer), Tolkien's The Hobbit for Vivendi Universal, Alpha Protocol, The Wheelman, Blacksite: Area 51, Star Trek: Legacy, Blazing Angels: Squadrons of WWII, and Dead Head Fred.

Abernethy returned to performing live in 2014 and was the Overall Grand Prize Winner of the 2021 International Acoustic Music Awards. In 2019 he was the Grand Prize winner of American Songwriter's Bob Dylan Song Contest. His last album Normal Isn’t Normal Anymore was released in 2021 and produced by Grammy nominated producer Neilson Hubbard.

== Selected works ==
- Normal Isn't Normal Anymore Rod Abernethy, Songs From Downstairs Records
- The Man I'm Supposed To Be Rod Abernethy, Songs From Downstairs Records
- Damaged Core High Voltage Software, Oculus Rift
- Adventure Time Vicious Cycle, Cartoon Network
- Pacific Rim Warner Bros.
- RAGE id Software, Bethesda
- Despicable Me D3 Publisher, Vicious Cycle Software
- Earth Defense Force: Insect Armageddon D3 Publisher, Vicious Cycle Software
- TERA: Rising Bluehole Studios, En Masse Entertainment
- Dead Space Electronic Arts
- Wheelman Midway/Ubisoft
- Darksiders Promotional Trailer, THQ
- Eat Lead D3Publisher
- Alpha Protocol Obsidian, Sega
- Transformers Animated Activision
- Dead Head Fred D3Publisher
- Hour of Victory Midway
- Horsez Ubisoft
- Star Trek: Encounters Bethesda, Paramount
- The Hobbit Vivendi Universal Games, Sierra Entertainment
- Blazing Angels Ubisoft
- Lineage II, Scions of Destiny Promotional Trailer, NC Soft
- Gauntlet: Seven Sorrows Midway
- Rayman Raving Rabbids Ubisoft
- Flushed Away D3Publishing of America
- Warhawk Promotional Trailers, SCEA
- Rise and Fall: Civilizations at War Stainless Steel Studios
- Prince of Persia: The Two Thrones Promotional Trailers, Ubisoft
- Heroes of Might and Magic V Promotional Trailers, Ubisoft
- Jaws Unleashed Majesco
- Pac-Man World Rally Namco
- Unaccounted IV Audiofonics
- Area 51 Midway
- Rise of the Kasai Sony Computer Entertainment America
- King Arthur Konami, Touchstone Pictures
- The Sims Bustin' Out Electronic Arts, Maxis
- The Urbz Electronic Arts, Maxis
- Wars and Warriors: Joan of Arc Enlight Software
- Star Wars Trilogy: Apprentice of the Force Ubisoft
- Curious George Vicious Cycle, Nickelodeon
- Shinobi THQ
- Altered Beast THQ
- Atlantis The Lost Continent Disney, THQ
- Cabela’s Big Game Hunter Activision
- Dark Side Of The Moon SouthPeak Games
- Ellis Island The History Channel
- Looney Tunes Assorted Nuts Warner Bros.
- Marvel Universe Konami
- Marvel: Dark Reign Vicious Cycle, D3Publisher
- Monster Garage Activision
- Tejumin SouthPeak Games
- Wild Wild West Warner Bros. Interactive
- Zathura Take 2 Interactive
