= D3 Publisher =

Japanese video game developer and publisher

D3 Publisher Inc.
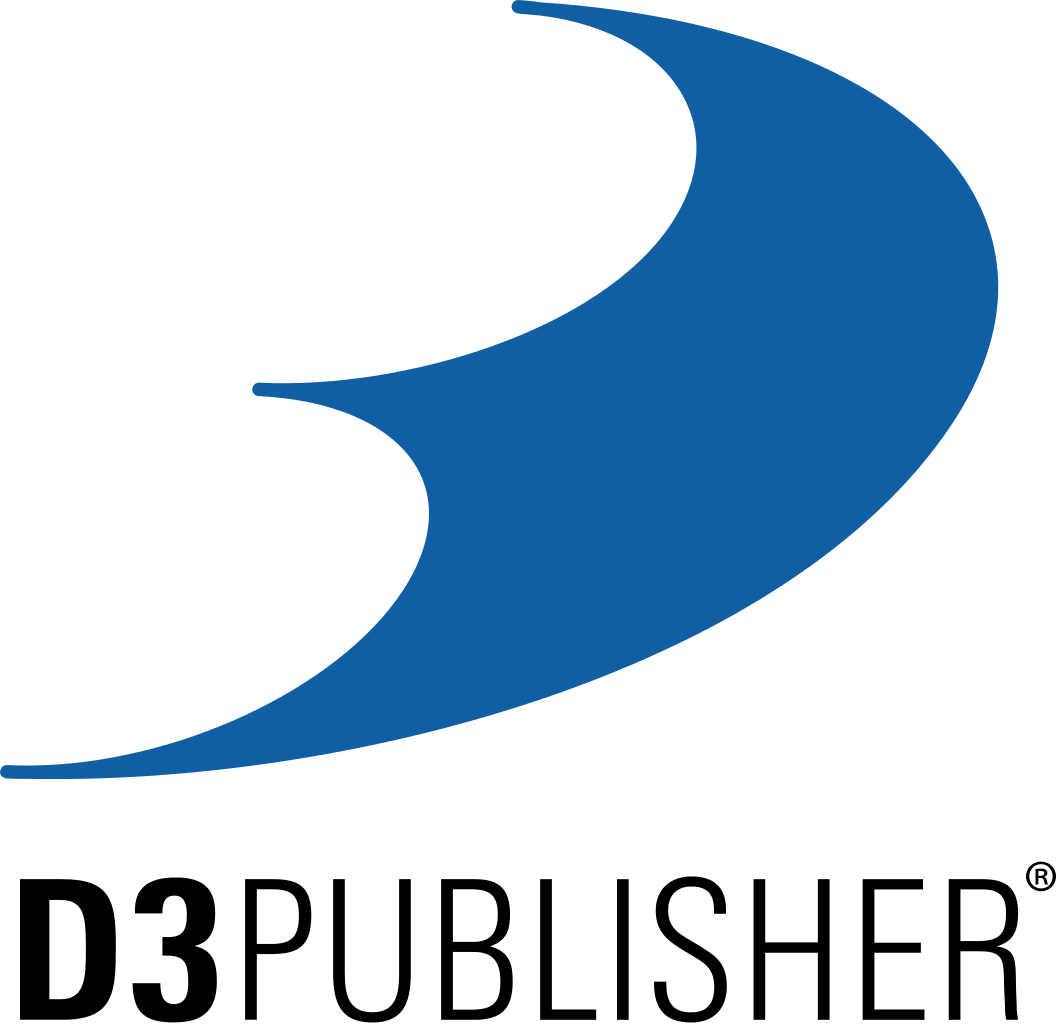
- Native name: 株式会社ディースリー・パブリッシャー
- Romanized name: Kabushiki-gaisha Dīsurī Paburisshā
- Formerly: CM Japan Co., Ltd.; International Signal Co., Ltd.; D3 Publisher Co., Ltd.
- Type: Subsidiary
- Industry: Video game
- Founded: February 5, 1992; 34 years ago
- Headquarters: Chiyoda, Tokyo, Japan
- Area served: Japan, North America
- Key people: Toshihiro Nada (president); Yuji Ito (executive chairman)
- Products: Bullet Girls series; Earth Defense Force series; Omega Labyrinth series; Onechanbara series; Simple series
- Net income: ▲¥342.828 million (2020)
- Total assets: ▲¥3.783 billion (2020)
- Number of employees: 21 (2020)
- Parent: Culture Publishers (1992–2006); D3 Inc. (2006–2009); Bandai Namco Holdings (2009–present)
- Website: d3p.co.jp

D3 Publisher Inc. (Note: Japanese: 株式会社ディースリー・パブリッシャー, Hepburn: Kabushiki gaisha Dī Surī Paburissha) is a Japanese video game developer and publisher founded on February 5, 1992. The company is known for the Simple series of budget-priced video games. Their games have been released for the Game Boy Advance, Nintendo DS, Nintendo 3DS, Nintendo Switch, PlayStation Portable, PlayStation Vita, PlayStation 2, PlayStation 3, PlayStation 4, PlayStation 5, GameCube, Wii, Xbox, Xbox 360, Wii U, Android, and iOS.

== History ==
In April 1997, Culture Publishers, a movie and television distributor, formed a video game division, which was led by Yiji Ito. The division made a name for itself the following year when it introduced the Simple 1500 series of budget titles for the PlayStation, which by 2001 had sold seven million units.

In 1999, Culture Publishers announced that it would exit the video game business, with Yiji Ito planning to purchase the division and re-establish it as an independent company. In June, Ito purchased and renamed International Signal Co., Ltd., as D3 Publisher Co., Ltd. International Signal, originally formed in 1992 as CM Japan, was a real estate company, and after the purchase, its real estate operations were terminated. On July 12, Ito officially purchased Culture Publishers' video game division and merged it into D3 Publisher.

In September 2002, D3 Publisher formed a new joint-venture development/publishing subsidiary with Sega called 3D Ages, with D3 Publisher holding a 49% stake in the new joint-venture unit.

In August 2004, D3 announced it had purchased 100% in stocks of Japanese studio Entertainment Software Publishing for ¥120 million, becoming a fully-owned subsidiary.

In April 2005, D3 signed a deal with Buena Vista Games to publish a majority of its video games in Japan.

In April, D3 Publisher Co., Ltd. was renamed to D3 Inc. and became a holding company, with the publishing and distribution portion of the Japanese business transitioning to a new company under the D3 Publisher Co., Ltd. name.

In February 2009, Bandai Namco Holdings gained a 70% controlling share of D3 and announced that it would fully purchase the company. On March 18, Bandai Namco held a 95% share and announced they would acquire the rest of the company.

On April 1, 2010, D3 Publisher Co., Ltd. and ESP merged and folded into D3 Inc., which was renamed to D3 Publisher Inc. on the same day. D3 began a more straightforward partnership with Bandai Namco, with their US division publishing select Namco Bandai Games titles for the North American market.

=== International subsidiaries ===
In October 2004, D3 announced that it would expand its operations into North America, founding D3 Publisher of America, Inc. in November. The separately operated division, of which D3 held 99.5% of its shares, was intended to release and localise D3's Simple budget game series, but instead focused on the licensed children's game market. In an interview, the company's VP of marketing stated that they had no plans to release D3's budget titles in North America.

D3 Publisher of America's most frequent licensee was Cartoon Network, of which the company would hold worldwide video game rights to numerous original series broadcast by the network, including Hi Hi Puffy AmiYumi, Ben 10, The Secret Saturdays, Adventure Time and Regular Show.

At the end of January 2006, D3 opened a European branch, D3 Publisher of Europe Ltd., which would release many of the same products as the North American branch. The first title that the company would release would be Flushed Away.

In May 2006, D3 signed a North American co-publishing and distribution deal with Viz Media and Tomy to release localised versions of the latter's Naruto titles.

In January 2007, D3 Publisher of Europe launched a budget label, Essential Games, which would release Simple 2000 titles that would be aimed towards younger audiences. This would allow the company to market D3's budget titles on their own, and replaced a prior deal held with Digital Bros division 505 GameStreet.

In June 2007, D3 acquired North Carolina–based game development studio Vicious Cycle Software and transitioned it to D3 Publisher of America. This expanded the division towards the in-house development market.

In November 2008, D3 signed a deal with Imagi Animation Studios to release video games based on Astro Boy.

In February 2012, they signed a deal with DreamWorks Animation to handle worldwide video game rights to Madagascar 3: Europe's Most Wanted, Rise of the Guardians, and The Croods. This followed DreamWorks' former video game partner, THQ, exiting the licensed kids' game business to focus on core gaming.

The last retail video game released by the company was Earth Defense Force 2025 in February 2014. The company then exited the licensed children's game market, and both Cartoon Network and DreamWorks Animation signed new licensing agreements with Orange County-based publisher Little Orbit in March 2014. During the Spring, Little Orbit acquired Vicious Cycle Software from D3 Publisher of America, with the company officially announcing it in September. These changes allowed the company to refocus on releasing mobile games, with Adventure Time: Card Wars and Marvel Puzzle Quest being the first two titles under the new strategy.

In May 2015, D3 Publisher of America Inc. announced that it would change its name to D3 Go! as part of its restructuring. While the company would mainly focus on the mobile game market, they announced that they would have the possible likelihood of localising select titles from the Japanese division, which remained the same.

On June 27, 2022, Italian video game publisher 505 Games announced that they had purchased D3 Go!. The news followed 505's acquisition of Puzzle Quest developer Infinity Plus Two, allowing 505 to take full control of the franchise.

== See also ==
- List of D3 Publisher video games
- Entertainment Software Publishing
