= Onechanbara Z2: Chaos =

2014 video game

- Cover art for the Limited Edition
- Developer: Tamsoft
- Publishers: JP: D3 Publisher; NA: Xseed Games; EU: NIS America
- Director: Shunsuke Tezuka
- Producer: Shintarō Nakaoka
- Artist: Shunsuke Tezuka
- Writers: Goki Miura, Shunsuke Tezuka
- Composers: Akihi Motoyama, Mutsumi Ishimura, Keisuke Sugiyama, Yuki Mori
- Series: Onechanbara
- Engine: PhyreEngine
- Platforms: PlayStation 4, Microsoft Windows
- Release: JP: October 30, 2014; NA: July 21, 2015; AU: August 27, 2015; EU: August 28, 2015; Microsoft Windows; June 2, 2016
- Genres: Action, hack and slash
- Mode: Single-player

Onechanbara Z2: Chaos (お姉チャンバラZ2 ～カオス～, OneeChanbara Z2) is a 2014 hack and slash video game developed by Tamsoft. Part of the Onechanbara series, it is the sequel to the 2012 Japan-exclusive Xbox 360 title OneChanbara Z ~ Kagura ~ (お姉チャンバラZ ~カグラ~, OneeChanbara Z), and the first game in the series to be localized since Onechanbara: Bikini Samurai Squad and OneChanbara: Bikini Zombie Slayers in 2009.

== Gameplay ==
The gameplay has been compared to Bayonetta, and revolves around hack and slash combat. Throughout the game, two sets of playable characters can be swapped with on the fly, each boasting their own unique attacks and abilities (the characters at hand depend on the given stage). Throughout the game, players will earn yellow orbs, which represent the form of currency. These orbs may be exchanged for new combat moves and gear.

Players will battle a variety of enemies, mainly zombies, werewolves, ghouls, and demons. In order to defeat these foes, weapons such as swords, chainsaws, and guns are available. Slaying enemies will result in the dismemberment of limbs, as well as an in-game combo.

After completing a level, the user is graded on their performance throughout the stage. Factors such as combo length, amount of items used, damage dealt, and damage received can all affect this score in a positive and negative manner. These scores can also be submitted to the worldwide leader boards.

== Plot ==
The Banefuls and the Vampirics are two ancient rival demonic bloodlines. After the numbers of both factions dwindled to almost nothing it was thought that the blood feud was over. After the Vampiric sisters Kagura and Saaya defeated their treacherous adoptive mother, the Vampire Queen Carmilla, at the end of the last game, aided from the shadows by Aya and Saki, two legendary zombie-hunting sisters of Baneful Blood, the truce came to an abrupt end and the two sets of sisters could restrain themselves no longer.

Carmilla's throne room became a battleground once again as the two pairs of sisters battled for supremacy. The battle, however, was undecided, as the floor beneath them collapsed sending the four into the abyss below, but not before glancing a mysterious, slender, green-haired woman now sitting in Carmilla's throne. The girls become separated from their respective sisters and are pushed into uneasy alliances for survival. In the catacombs beneath the castle, Kagura is forced to drink Aya's blood in order to regenerate after she is critically injured by demonic moles being kept in the castle's depths. The fusion of the two bloodlines within Kagura's body allows her to temporarily transform into a powerful new form, Dare Drive, slaying all who stand before her.

Saaya and Saki are thrust into a pocket hell dimension but are able to escape by co-operating to defeat the waves of undead blocking their exit. They escape to the castle village but are attacked by a masked undead assassin known as Misha. Misha bests the girls and seriously injures Saaya. Kagura and Aya reunite with them and advise Saaya to feed on Saki's blood in order to recover and transform into her own Dare Drive. This works, and the four girls work together to force Misha to retreat and slay her undead entourage. Now working together, the girls are advised by their friend Anna of the Zombie Prevention Force (ZPF) to wipe out several zombie outbreaks around the world and eliminate several high-profile targets. The attacks are revealed to be diversions to keep the girls at bay whilst Misha locates the ZPF Headquarters and slaughters and zombifies the personnel within. Fortunately, being a field operative, Anna is absent and evades the attack.

The four girls arrive at the scene where the results of Kagura and Saaya's vampiric bites finally take their effects on Aya and Saki's Baneful bodies, granting them similar transformations known as Xtatics. The four cut their way through floor after floor of zombified ZPF whilst chasing Misha. On the rooftop, the green-haired woman escapes by helicopter, leaving the party to battle Misha. With their enhanced abilities, the girls are able to defeat Misha once and for all. The mortally wounded Misha falls from the rooftop as her mask shatters, revealing that she was in fact Misery, a rival Baneful and loose ally of Aya and Saki's late nemesis, Himiko. Misery was slain a year previously by Aya and Saki to end her insane bloodlust and was subsequently resurrected by the green-haired woman.

Anna contacts the party with news that the green-haired woman has returned to Carmilla's castle. The girls follow and attempt to evade the awaiting zombie army by navigating a network of tunnels. Despite many traps set for them, the girls successfully confront the green-haired woman in the now restored throne room. The woman identifies herself as Evangeline, or 'Evange' for short, and reveals her goal of creating a world for both the Banefuls and Vampirics; a world she aims to create by fusing the bloodlines, much like the party did previously. Evange offers the girls a place in her utopia, but soon withdraws her offer when she realizes the girls still intend to kill her. Evange attacks the party, using her own fused blood to transform, but the party emerges victorious and slays her.

The girls agree to put the ancient blood feud behind them and make their alliance permanent. Later, Anna contacts the girls and reveals Evange's origins. Evange was a researcher working for Carmilla who used the castle's facilities to further her own cause. She was also Misery's older sister.

== Release ==
All launch editions in North America came packaged as the Banana Split Limited Edition, which included an 80-page art book, soundtrack CD, and exclusive costumes.

The game will feature dual audio support between the original Japanese voice cast and an all-new English voice cast.

== Reception ==
Reception

Aggregate scores
Aggregator	Score
GameRankings	59.22%
Metacritic	59/100

Review scores
Publication	Score
Destructoid	5.5/10
Famitsu	31/40

Onechanbara Z2: Chaos received mixed reviews from critics, currently averaging a 59.22% on GameRankings and a 59/100 on Metacritic, respectively. Praise was given to the games character models and addictive combat, while criticism was drawn to its dated environmental graphics.

The game fared well with Famitsu reviewers, whose combined scores added to a 31/40 (8/8/8/7).

Kyle MacGregor of Destructoid awarded the game a 5.5/10. MacGregor praised the game's combat, character designs, and sexual fan service, while taking issue to the "linear and repetitive mission structure", and also disliking the enemy AI, commenting that they simply rely on sheer size to pose any sort of challenge.

Hardcore Gamer's Adam Beck was highly critical of the game. Despite giving applause to the high level of customization and fluid swordplay, he felt the poor dialog, bad mission structure, repetitive combat and short game length brought the game experience down, awarding the game a 4/10. He did however call Onechanbara Z2: Chaos one of the better entries in the series.

Penny Arcade featured the game in a "First 15" video feature, and found little to like. The "First 15" segments feature writer Jerry Holkins and artist Mike Krahulik playing a game for fifteen minutes, and provide a record of their reactions and reflections on the game being played. Holkins and Krahulik were uniformly negative, citing feelings of disgust while playing. They criticized the character modeling of the enemies, the costumes of the protagonists, the gameplay, and the spirit of the game.

Matt Sainsbury, reviewing for DigitallyDownloaded.net, gave the game a 9/10, saying that while technical bugs existed, such as a sometimes poor camera, they never detracted from the fast paced combat.
