= Earth Defense Force: Iron Rain =

- Japanese PlayStation 4 box art
- Developer: Yuke's
- Publisher: D3 Publisher
- Director: Naoto Ueno
- Producer: Nobuyuki Okajima
- Designer: Tomohiro Shibuya
- Programmer: Shintaro Matsubara
- Artists: Masaaki Hashimoto; Takashi Komiyama; Kazuyuki Isayama
- Composers: Masanori Ōtsuka; Yuichi Baba; Shinya Chikamori; Akari Kaida
- Series: Earth Defense Force
- Engine: Unreal Engine 4
- Platforms: PlayStation 4, Windows
- Release: PlayStation 4; April 11, 2019; Windows; October 15, 2019
- Genre: Third-person shooter
- Modes: Single-player, multiplayer

Earth Defense Force: Iron Rain (Note: Japanese: アース ディフェンス フォース アイアン レイン, Hepburn: Āsu Difensu Fōsu Aian Rein) is a third-person shooter video game developed by Yuke's and published by D3 Publisher for the PlayStation 4. It is a spin-off of the Earth Defense Force series and, like the previous 2011 spin-off Earth Defense Force: Insect Armageddon, is geared more toward Western audiences, with a more serious tone compared to the main series by Sandlot. A Japanese release date was initially set for late 2018, but the game was delayed into 2019. It was released simultaneously worldwide on April 11, 2019, to mixed but generally positive reviews.

== Gameplay ==
Like previous entries in the series, Earth Defense Force: Iron Rain is a third-person action shooting game, where the player takes control of an Earth Defense Force (EDF) soldier and battles an onslaught of alien enemies. The game features four soldier classes, the Trooper, Jet Lifter, Heavy Striker, and Prowl Rider, all of which feature the option to play as a male or female soldier. The game uses the same type of ammo system as other EDF games, with most weapons having no ammunition limit and only limited by reloading times. Enemies drop Energy Gems, which can be picked up to power the player's Energy Core. Energy Gems also serve as the in-game currency, which the player collects during missions and can subsequently use to purchase new weapons or apparel for the playable character. On some missions, the enemy Kindred Rebellion faction may enter the combat area to try to loot Energy Gems dropped by fallen Aggressors. While the Rebellion will attack Aggressors, it is also hostile toward the EDF.

In addition to a campaign consisting of 52 total missions, Earth Defense Force: Iron Rain includes multiple online game modes. Players can play the co-op campaign online with up to five other players, or engage in the PvP "Mercenary Mode," where two teams of four compete to collect the most Energy Gems. One team is the EDF, while the other is the Kindred Rebellion, and both battle against waves of Aggressors and the other team to collect all dropped Energy Gems. Two-player split-screen gameplay is also available for the offline campaign.

== Plot ==
The game is set in an alternate continuity separated from any past Earth Defense Force games.

In this new continuity, Alien invaders (here named "Aggressors") attacked Earth in 2028 using a giant mountain-like ship known as the Hivecraft which have the ability to drop thousands of giant insect-like monsters and bipedal robots through a portal, leading to the destruction of most of Earth's biggest cities. In response, Earth's richest nations join forces to form the Earth Defense Force.

In 2033, the EDF creates the PA-Gears, exoskeletons that grant superhuman abilities which are powered by the energy gems inside the alien robots and giant insects. During a desperate attempt to bring down the Hivecraft in Los Angeles, EDF soldiers wearing experimental PA-Gears managed to surround the ship. However, the ship uses its energy to destroy the area around it, killing all but one soldier known as "Closer" (the player character) who is equipped with a powered energy gem and manages to bring down the Hivecraft but falls into a coma soon after.

Seven years later, they wake up from their coma not having aged, and they are assigned to Blast Team under Takuma Yagami. In the years after the destruction of the Hivecraft, the EDF has been reduced to just a few hundred members protecting designated "priority sectors" where the EDF's financial sponsors live, which mostly comprise corporations.

During a mission on Arizona, Blast team faces an unknown enemy type not based on an Earth insect, leading to the EDF leadership to suspect that the Alien invaders have comeback to finish humanity. Their suspicions are validated with the arrival of a titanic six-legged mechanical monster known as Gargant which is later destroyed in Arizona by Blast team.

During a mission to San Francisco, Blast team is attacked by Kindred Rebellion, led by siblings Gideon and Faiza, former members of the EDF's Flare team who rebelled against EDF leadership over their decision to exclusively protect priority sectors, leaving everyone else on their own.

During a night mission on Los Angeles, a Hivecraft appears, confirming that the Aggressors have returned in force to destroy humanity.

Blast team is later sent underground where they find Kindred Rebellion members testing a new type of PA-Gear that can ride and control the giant insects, with Blast team proceeding to steal the technology to develop Prowl Rider PA-Gears. In response, Kindred Rebellion declares war on the EDF and attacks one of the EDF's warehouses in Arizona but are repelled and forced into hiding.

During a mission on the North American west coast, Blast team finds a titanic triceratops-like monster the EDF names Raznid, which proves to be nearly indestructible and causes untold destruction on the west coast before disappearing.

Later, another Hivecraft appears over the ruins of Los Angeles but its repelled by Blast team. After Raznid reappears on the west coast, a column of tanks is used to attempt to kill it but the attempt fails and most of the tanks are destroyed.

Sometime later, one of the EDF's warehouses are attacked by a new enemy type which looks like a combination of Stag Beetles and fireflies which the EDF names Larvae, with them later discovering that they come from Raznid itself, thus making Raznid a priority target for the EDF.

During another attempt to bring down Raznid, the monster collapses from exhaustion and just as it seems they will be able to kill it, a Hivecraft appears and uses its energy to heal Raznid which proceeds to climb the Hivecraft to feed from its energy gems before escaping.

During a mission to Nevada, Blast team saves members of Kindred Rebellion under the command of Faiza from alien robots known as Harvesters. This act of kindness causes them to leave on good terms with Blast team, with Faiza later helping Blast team during a mission on San Francisco.

When Blast team is sent to investigate the aftermath of a battle against the alien invaders in Los Angeles, a Hivecraft appears and revives all the dead giant insects using a strange gas. Following the battle, the Hivecraft begins to revive hundreds of dead giant insects across North America, forcing the EDF to reveal their secret headquarters; a large flying ship which they plan to use to kill Raznid.

After locating Raznid in the ruins of a city, they shoot the ship's railgun twice on it, heavily wounding the monster. However, a Hivecraft appears and uses its energy to heal Raznid but instead of healing it, it causes it to mutate into a giant flower-like monster which manages to one-shot the EDF ship, forcing Blast team and members of Kindred Rebellion to battle the monster on foot. During the battle, a second Hivecraft appears to help the monster but their energy anthenas are destroyed by Closer which finally allows the combined force to kill Raznid. Upon dying, two more Hivecrafts appear but all four decide to abandon Earth through portals, causing all alien robots to shutdown across the world. The EDF celebrates their victory over the aliens with Closer being celebrated as a hero.

In a post-credit scene, somewhere underground, a single Queen Ant egg is heard cracking up.

== Reception ==
Reception

Aggregate score
Aggregator	Score
Metacritic	PS4: 69/100; PC: 65/100

Review scores
Publication	Score
Computer Games Magazine	7/10
Destructoid	7.5/10
Game Informer	7/10
GameRevolution	5/10
IGN	7.2/10
Push Square	7/10
Shacknews	8/10
USgamer	3/5

Earth Defense Force: Iron Rain has an aggregate score of 69 on Metacritic based on 49 reviews.
