= Digital Frontier =

Japanese animation studio

Digital Frontier Inc.
- Native name: 株式会社デジタル・フロンティア
- Romanized name: Kabushiki gaisha Dejitaru Furontia
- Type: Kabushiki gaisha
- Founded: 1993; 33 years ago
- Headquarters: Shibuya, Tokyo, Japan
- Key people: Hidenori Ueki CEO
- Number of employees: 265
- Parent: Fields Corporation
- Subsidiaries: GEMBA (2006–2024); Digital Frontier (Taiwan) Inc.
- Website: www.dfx.co.jp

Digital Frontier Inc., (Note: Japanese: 株式会社デジタル・フロンティア, Hepburn: Kabushiki gaisha Dejitaru Furontia) also known as Frontier Pictures, Inc., (Note: 株式会社フロンティア・ピクチャーズ, Kabushiki gaisha Furontia Pikuchazu) is a Japanese motion picture production company based in Shibuya, Tokyo, with a distinguished large scale CG production department. The company is equipped with motion capture studio called "OPAKIS" in Odaiba, Tokyo.

The company started producing CG works in 1994 as a new section of TYO Image Enterprise. In 1997 Digital Frontier moved to Daikanyama and became a subsidiary of TYO Corporation then three years later it became corporate company Digital Frontier Inc. as it is known today. Its earlier works are Death Note (live action film) and Appleseed (CG film). In 2010, Digital Frontier's parent company changed from TYO Inc. to Fields Corporation, which is specialized in planning and development, and sales of pachinko machines. The company has subsidiaries in Malaysia, Taiwan, and Japan.

The company created reveal trailers for Super Smash Bros. for Nintendo 3DS and Wii U and Super Smash Bros. Ultimate.

== Works ==
=== TV Anime ===
- 2009: Viper's Creed (co-animated with AIC Spirits)
- 2017: Infini-T Force (co-animated with Tatsunoko Production)
- 2019: The Magnificent Kotobuki (production co-operation, animated by GEMBA)

=== Animated films ===
- 2002: Pokémon Heroes: Latias and Latios
- 2004: Appleseed
- 2006: Atagoal: Cat's Magical Forest
- 2007: Appleseed Ex Machina
- 2008: Resident Evil: Degeneration
- 2009: Summer Wars
- 2011: Tekken: Blood Vengeance
- 2012: Resident Evil: Damnation
- 2012: Wolf Children
- 2016: Gantz: O
- 2018: Mirai
- 2018: Doraemon the Movie: Nobita's Treasure Island
- 2018: Infini-T Force the Movie: Farewell Gatchaman My Friend
- 2020: The Magnificent Kotobuki Complete Edition (production co-operation, animated by GEMBA)
- 2021: Belle

=== Live-action films ===
- 2005: Tokyo Zombie
- 2006: Death Note
- 2006: Death Note the Last name
- 2008: L Change the WorLd
- 2008: Snakes and Earrings (Hebi ni Piasu)
- 2011: Usotsuki Mi-kun to Kowareta Ma-chan
- 2011: GANTZ Part 1 & Part 2
- 2013: Jellyfish Eyes
- 2013: Tabidachi no Shimauta ~Jyugo no Haru~
- 2016: Death Note: Light Up the New World
- 2018: Bleach

=== Video game cutscenes and work assistance ===
- 2002: Resident Evil
- 2002: Super Mario Sunshine
- 2005: Castlevania: Curse of Darkness
- 2005: Resident Evil 4
- 2005: Sengoku Basara
- 2005: Rogue Galaxy
- 2005: Killer7
- 2005: Fire Emblem: Path of Radiance
- 2006: Dirge of Cerberus: Final Fantasy VII
- 2006: Onimusha: Dawn of Dreams
- 2006: OneChanbara: Bikini Samurai Squad
- 2007: Fire Emblem: Radiant Dawn, Lost Odyssey
- 2008: Metal Gear Solid 4: Guns of the Patriots
- 2008: White Knight Chronicles
- 2008: OneChanbara: Bikini Zombie Slayers
- 2008: Tekken 6: Bloodline Rebellion
- 2010: Vanquish
- 2010: Yakuza 4
- 2011: Tekken Tag Tournament 2
- 2011: Yakuza: Dead Souls
- 2012: Yakuza 5
- 2012: Binary Domain
- 2013: Metal Gear Rising: Revengeance
- 2014: Super Smash Bros. for Nintendo 3DS and Wii U
- 2014: Yakuza Ishin
- 2014: Metal Gear Solid V: Ground Zeroes
- 2015: Yakuza 0
- 2016: Pokémon Duel
- 2016: Yakuza Kiwami
- 2016: Yakuza 6
- 2017: Tekken 7
- 2017: Yakuza Kiwami 2
- 2018: Super Smash Bros. Ultimate
- 2018: Fist of the North Star: Lost Paradise
- 2019: Judgment
- 2019: Resident Evil 2
- 2019: Monkey King: Hero is Back
- 2020: Yakuza: Like a Dragon
- 2020: Resident Evil 3
- 2023: Like A Dragon: Ishin!
- 2023: Like A Dragon Gaiden
- 2024: Tekken 8
- 2024: Like a Dragon: Infinite Wealth
- 2025: Kirby Air Riders
