= Simple (video game series) =

- Cover art of The Chikyū Bōeigun 2, a Simple 2000 Series game
- Genre: Various
- Developer: Various
- Publisher: D3 Publisher
- Platforms: PlayStation, Dreamcast, PlayStation 2, Mobile phone, Game Boy Advance, PlayStation 3, Nintendo DS, PlayStation Vita, Wii U, PlayStation 4, PlayStation 5, Nintendo Switch, Xbox One, Xbox Series, Nintendo Switch 2
- First release: Simple 1500 Series Vol. 1: The Mahjong; October 22, 1998
- Latest release: Card & Casino; April 23, 2026

The Simple (Note: Japanese: シンプル, Hepburn: Shinpuru) series is a line of budget-priced video games published by Japanese company D3 Publisher, a subsidiary of Bandai Namco Entertainment. Games in the series have been developed by several different companies, including Sandlot, Success, Irem, and Taito (primarily for re-releases of their arcade ports, such as RC de Go!). It was introduced in 1998 for the PlayStation, and has been released for platforms such as the PlayStation 2, Nintendo DS, and mobile phones. The number in a series name indicates the price point of the games in the series; for instance, a "Simple 2000" series game would cost 2000 yen. Most of the games were developed specifically for the line, but it also included budget-priced re-releases of previously released games.

Early Simple games were generic interpretations of other common video game themes, including tennis, racing, and video board games such as mahjong. Beginning with the PlayStation 2, Simple games began using larger genres such as scrolling shooters and role-playing games, in addition to original ideas and concepts. As the games were sold at a low price point and required little development time, developers were able to experiment with gameplay concepts and mechanics. A few entries in the series were released outside Japan by other companies without the brand. After releasing two Simple games for the Nintendo 3DS in 2013, D3 has chosen to remove the Simple name from its budget titles for systems such as the Nintendo Switch and PlayStation 4. In 2022, D3Publisher announced that the Simple Series brand would return for the Nintendo Switch. The first Simple game on Nintendo Switch 2, The Mahjong, was released on December 25, 2025. The second Simple game for Nintendo Switch 2, Pool Room Billiard, was released on January 22, 2026. On April 23, 2026, D3 Publisher released Card & Casino for the Nintendo Switch 2.

The Simple series and several of its games, including Demolition Girl, The Maid Clothes and Machine Gun, Onechanbara and the Earth Defense Force series, have garnered notoriety outside Japan for their usually outlandish and bizarre nature. Publications have identified the series as being of considerably better quality than similar budget title ranges, with gameplay ideas they consider unique and interesting. As of 2007, the Simple series has sold over 20 million units across all platforms.

== Riho Futaba ==
Riho Futaba is a character and idol/gravure mascot for the Simple series created by D3. She's a young attractive Japanese female with light skin, short brown wavy hair, green colored eyes, and a curvaceous figure with a large bust standing at average height. She's usually clad in a blue or aqua bikini that accentuates her figure. She also appears in different outfits depending on which game she's featured in. She first made gaming debut in Love Songs♪ Idol ga Classmate in 2001 and had made multiple appearances in many of D3 and Simple games as a selectable or unlockable character including titles such as Demolition Girl (her most infamous title), the Dream Club series, Zombie Hunters and Zombie Hunters 2 from the OneeChanbara series, Earth Defense Force: World Brothers, Heart Beat Boxing, and All-Star Fighters to name a few out of many more games she's been in. In all of her appearances with voice acting she's voiced by Yuko Goto.

She also has a younger sister, Makoto Futaba, whom she shares some of her features with except her sister has shorter darker straight hair with a petite build. She also appeared in Zombie Hunters, Zombie Hunters 2, and All-Star Fighters.

== Development ==
D3 Publisher employs a number of external developers for the series, some of the most prolific being Tamsoft (of Battle Arena Toshinden fame) and HuneX - most are smaller or little-known companies, although several games have been licensed from Taito for a (usually enhanced) re-release.

Certain Simple series titles have attracted considerable interest outside Japan for various reasons, either gameplay quality or a particularly unique idea - these include The OneeChanbara and its sequels, as well as Sandlot's Monster Attack and Global Defence Force, which were based on their Gigantic Drive engine and were of considerably higher quality than most games in the series. Both of these series have had sequels for the Microsoft Xbox 360 video game console, although they were originally labelled under an "X" moniker (OneChanbara X and Earth Defense Force X) rather than a "Simple" one.

=== Localization ===
Much of the titles in the Simple series were localised outside of Japan and released as budget titles, mainly in European territories. They tended to feature different titles, new cover art, and slight updates to the graphics.

In North America, many of the Simple 1500 titles on the PlayStation were released by A1 Games, a budget imprint of publisher Agetec which was formed in January 2001. Some later titles were published by Mud Duck Productions, a budget imprint of ZeniMax Media. Compared to Europe, very few titles from the Simple 2000 series were released in North America; the only ones released were The Bass Fishing (as Fisherman's Bass Club), The Genshijin (as The Adventures of Darwin) and OneChanbara.

In Europe, a majority of Simple 1500 and Simple 2000 titles were licensed to Midas Interactive Entertainment. Agetec's European branch also published select titles, while others were handled by Digital Bros' 505 GameStreet label. In 2007, D3 Publisher's European branch took over publishing the titles themselves under a budget label named Essential Games.

The only title in the Wii subseries to be released internationally was The Party Game, which was localised as Family Party: 30 Great Games. Its subsequent entries on the system were commissioned by the company's US branch and were not released in Japan. The only entry on the Wii U, Family Party: 30 Great Games Obstacle Arcade, was released in Japan as a Simple series title.

Since the series' return in 2021, D3 has localised the titles themselves for international release. The first volume in the Nintendo Switch 2 lineup, The Majong, was released outside Japan as Riichi Mahjong, and was the first of the company's Majong titles to be localised and released outside Japan.

== See also ==
- Success, another Japanese publisher whose SuperLite series is similar to D3's Simple series.
- Sega Ages, a Sega franchise which the Sega Ages 2500 series is also similar to this series.
