= Earth Defense Force 2025 =

2013 video game

- Japanese PlayStation 3 box art
- Developer: Sandlot
- Publishers: D3 Publisher: EU: Namco Bandai Games (PS3, 360); NA: Marvelous USA (PS4); EU: PQube (PS4)
- Directors: Toshio Noguchi; Takehiro Homma
- Designer: Takehiro Honma
- Programmer: Toshio Noguchi
- Artist: Masatsugu Igarashi
- Composers: Masafumi Takada; Jun Fukuda
- Series: Earth Defense Force
- Platforms: PlayStation 3 Xbox 360; PlayStation 4 Microsoft Windows; Nintendo Switch
- Release: July 4, 2013: PlayStation 3, Xbox 360; JP: July 4, 2013; NA: February 18, 2014; PAL: February 21, 2014 PlayStation 4; JP: April 2, 2015; NA: December 8, 2015; EU: February 12, 2016; AU: July 7, 2016 Microsoft Windows; WW: July 18, 2016 Nintendo Switch; JP: December 22, 2022
- Genre: Third-person shooter
- Modes: Single-player, multiplayer

Earth Defense Force 2025 (Note: Known in Japan as Chikyū Bōeigun 4 (Japanese: 地球防衛軍4; lit. Earth Defense Forces 4)) is a third-person shooter developed by Sandlot and published by D3 Publisher, for the PlayStation 3 and Xbox 360. It is the follow-up to Earth Defense Force 2017. A remastered version, titled Earth Defense Force 4.1: The Shadow of New Despair, (Note: Japanese: 地球防衛軍4.1 THE SHADOW OF NEW DESPAIR(ザ・シャドウ・オブ・ニュー・ディスペアー), Hepburn: Chikyū Bōeigun 4.1: Za Shadō obu Nyū Disupeā; lit. Earth Defense Forces 4.1: The Shadow of New Despair) was released for PlayStation 4 and Windows in 2016, which includes the original game as well as a new expansion. A Nintendo Switch version was released in Japan in December 2022. A reboot titled Earth Defense Force 5 was released on December 7, 2017.

== Gameplay ==
The player takes control of an EDF soldier from one of four soldier classes. To fight these alien forces the player can access several weapons in the game, ranging from assault rifles and sniper rifles to rocket launchers, grenades, and laser weapons. Only two weapons may be selected for each mission with the exception of the Fencer, who can have four weapons, and the Air Raider, which can have three. The game has more than seven hundred weapons; roughly 175 weapons per soldier class. This the highest weapon count of any EDF. Some levels also contain vehicles which can be operated. The game takes place across levels featuring destructible environments, taking place in settings such as cities, beaches, hills, tunnels and more. There is no penalty for collateral damage that is inflicted on the environment by the player, for instance when buildings crumble after sustaining a few hits from a rocket launcher or grenade. Other EDF soldiers can be recruited or followed, and attack enemies on sight, as well as provide radio chatter. You can also customize the color of your soldier.

There are several difficulty levels. More effective weapons are dropped by the enemies in the game at the higher difficulty levels, encouraging players to repeat the missions. In addition to weapons, armor enhancements which function as permanent maximum health bonuses are dropped along with healing items.

== Story ==
The Earth Defense Force, a unified multinational military sponsored by nearly every country, is founded after detecting an impending alien visit in case the aliens prove to be hostile. In the year 2017, that proved to be true and the EDF fought against the Ravagers, an alien race that attacked Earth with giant insect-like creatures, UFOs, robots and gigantic, 120-foot-tall lizard-like creatures. Eight years after defeating the last Ravager in Arizona (even though the final battle in the previous game was in Japan), they attack again with new creatures, evolved from their underground nest. Among them is the Retiarius, a spider-like creature which makes gigantic spiderwebs, and giant wasps. In the year 2025, the EDF must protect the Earth again from the alien invaders.

== Downloadable content ==
D3 has released several addons for this game. They were originally announced as bonuses for pre-orders of the Japanese version, including exclusive content for purchasing the game at some web retailers. The content is also available for free on PlayStation Store and Xbox Marketplace as of 2015 in a special bundle named "Unstoppable Shooter Satisfaction Pack" (in Europe) or as four separate bundles, one for each class (in North America). There are a total of 8 weapon packs and 3 map packs (also bundled together in a "Season Pass") for a total of 45 additional missions.

== Reception ==
Reception

Aggregate score
Aggregator	Score			
Aggregator	PC	PS3	PS4	Xbox 360
Metacritic	79/100	69/100	64/100	68/100

Review scores
Publication	Score			
Publication	PC	PS3	PS4	Xbox 360
Destructoid	N/A	N/A	8/10	8.5/10
Eurogamer	N/A	5/10	N/A	N/A
Famitsu	N/A	34/40	32/40	34/40
Game Informer	N/A	8/10	N/A	8/10
GameRevolution	N/A	N/A	N/A	7/10
GameTrailers	N/A	N/A	N/A	8/10
IGN	N/A	6.5/10	N/A	6.5/10
Joystiq	N/A	4/5	N/A	N/A
PlayStation Official Magazine – UK	N/A	6/10	6/10	N/A
Official Xbox Magazine (US)	N/A	N/A	N/A	7.5/10
PC Gamer (UK)	80%	N/A	N/A	N/A
Polygon	N/A	N/A	N/A	7.5/10
Push Square	N/A	6/10	7/10	N/A
USgamer	N/A	3/5	N/A	N/A
The Escapist	N/A	N/A	N/A	2/5
Slant Magazine	N/A	N/A	3/5	2.5/5

The PC version received "generally favorable reviews", while the rest of the console versions received "mixed or average reviews", according to the review aggregation website Metacritic. In Japan, Famitsu gave it a score of one nine, two eights, and one nine for the PlayStation 3 and Xbox 360 versions; and all four eights for the PlayStation 4 version.

James Cunningham of Hardcore Gamer gave the PS3 version 4.5 out of 5, calling it "a fantastic example of everything that makes pure action gaming so much fun, packed with replay value and over the top set pieces, and a more than worthy sequel that tops its predecessor in every way." Edge gave the Xbox 360 version five out of ten, saying, "EDF was never about careful aiming or strategic cover or any of the other things that drive modern shooters, though – it's about superior firepower earned through RPG grind, but 2025 has made the happy grind gruelling." The magazine later gave the PS4 version six out of ten, saying, "To enjoy EDF, you've always needed to be willing to compromise. Those days are gone. It's never felt so fluid." GameZone gave the PS3 and Xbox 360 versions each 8.5 out of 10, saying, "When a gun seems purposefully terrible, or an enemy reacts in a hilarious way, it leaves you wondering if Sandlot is full of comedic genuises, or if they have a lot of happy accidents. Whatever the case, they've managed to make the best Earth Defense Force game yet, so they must be doing something right."

Forbes gave the PS4 version a score of eight out of ten and called it "a raucous and fun shooter with a different as well as more open ended approach compared to the more scripted movie wannabe type games out there. The dialogue is both silly and endearing and the combat is very satisfying." Shacknews gave the Xbox 360 version a score of six out of ten, saying, "Shortcomings aside, Earth Defense Force 2025 is an action experience that will put a big, stupid grin on your face. Like Starship Troopers, EDF is a campy adventure that doesn't attempt to redefine the paradigm, but offers a reliably good time." However, The Digital Fix gave the PS3 version five out of ten, saying that it "has a fiercely loyal following, and fans are likely to be happy embracing this latest title, bugs and all. For everyone else though, EDF 2025 is the gaming equivalent of Sharktopus: a bargain basement, low-budget cheesefest of the highest order, mildly amusing for a short time, filled with awful lines, and completely forgettable." James Stephanie Sterling of The Escapist gave the Xbox 360 version two stars out of five, saying that it "tries too hard at not trying hard enough, like one of those awful SyFy mutant movies. It knows it's terrible, and thinks it can get away with it by doubling down on its own awfulness. Clearly, this has worked for some, as the series has a fanbase. I don't get it, though. This is not so bad it's good. It's just plain bad, and there aren't enough giant insects in the world to convince me otherwise."

Slant Magazine gave the Xbox 360 version two-and-a-half stars out of five, saying that "Even though it tries so very hard to jam-pack a pick-up-and-play shooter with missions, weapons, and multiplayer options aplenty, it's a game that has limits to its staying power, leaving the player hungry for something more substantial." However, the same magazine gave the PS4 version three stars out of five, saying that it "doesn't ever completely shy away from using filler material after successfully building so much momentum." Metro gave the PS3 version five out of ten, saying that it was "No longer the Deadly Premonition of action games, just an outdated, half-broken, [sic] shooter that offers only glimpses of what it could've been." The newspaper later gave the PS4 version four out of ten, calling it "A remake of a rehash of a disappointing sequel... that only hints at what Earth Defense Force could be if the series would only show some forward momentum."
