= Global Defence Force Tactics =

2006 video game

- European box art
- Developer: thinkArts
- Publisher: D3 Publisher (Note: Released under the Essential Games banner in Europe.)
- Series: Earth Defense Force
- Platform: PlayStation 2
- Release: JP: July 27, 2006; EU: June 29, 2007; AU: October 15, 2007
- Genre: Turn-based strategy
- Mode: Single-player

Global Defence Force Tactics, known in Japan as Earth Defense Force Tactics, (Note: Japanese: THE地球防衛軍タクティクス, Hepburn: Za Chikyū Bōeigun Takutikusu) is a turn-based strategy game developed by thinkArts and published by D3 Publisher for the PlayStation 2.

== Gameplay ==
Players assume the role of GDF Commander and control GDF units in turn-based missions against the giant bug menace. Missions take place on 2D hex-maps, with attacks depicted by brief animated cutscenes.

The game has 50 stages and 250 different weapons.

== Reception ==
Reception for the game was negative. In Japan, Famitsu gave it a score of one three, one five, one six, and one five for a total of 19 out of 40.

== See also ==
- Simple series video games
