= Earth Defense Force 5 =

2017 video game

- Japanese PlayStation 4 box art
- Developer: Sandlot
- Publisher: D3 Publisher
- Directors: Toshio Noguchi; Takehiro Homma
- Producer: Nobuyuki Okajima
- Designer: Takehiro Homma
- Programmer: Toshio Noguchi
- Artist: Masatsugu Igarashi
- Writer: Takehiro Homma
- Composers: Masafumi Takada; Jun Fukuda
- Series: Earth Defense Force
- Platforms: PlayStation 4; Windows; Nintendo Switch 2
- Release: PlayStation 4; JP: December 7, 2017; WW: December 11, 2018 Windows; WW: July 11, 2019 Nintendo Switch 2; WW: October 8, 2026
- Genre: Third-person shooter
- Modes: Single-player, multiplayer

Earth Defense Force 5 (Note: Known in Japan as Chikyū Bōeigun 5 (Japanese: 地球防衛軍5; lit. Earth Defense Forces 5)) is the fifth main installment, and the eighth game in the Earth Defense Force video game series. Developed by Sandlot and published by D3 Publisher, the game was released for the PlayStation 4 in Japan on December 7, 2017. The game was released simultaneously in the United States, Europe, China, and South Korea on December 11, 2018, as a digital exclusive for the PlayStation 4. Earth Defense Force 5 departs from the continuity established by Earth Defense Force 2017 and Earth Defense Force 2025/4.1, and is set in a new continuity where the Earth Defense Force is a private military corporation and sees action for the first time in the year 2022.

== Gameplay ==
Earth Defense Force 5 follows the same gameplay style as the previous game, Earth Defense Force 4.1. Unlike 4.1 however, some missions now contain pre-placed vehicles, normally being civilian vehicles that the player can occupy.

The single player campaign features 110 missions, the highest number of any EDF game to date (not counting downloadable content). Some missions now contain story elements to follow, such as Mission 1, where the player receives training of the game's controls from an Earth Defense Force Ranger. Other levels require the player to follow a certain squad of soldiers in order to progress through the mission. The player unlocks harder difficulty settings after completing the game once.

== Downloadable content ==
Earth Defense Force 5 has an available season pass in Japan, which guarantees players access to all downloadable content as it is released. D3 Publisher confirmed that DLC would include both mission packs and aesthetic modifications such as skins for weapons and armor.

The first mission pack, Additional Mission Pack 1: Extra Challenge, was released in Japan on April 11, 2019, and costs 1,200 yen on the PlayStation Store. It consists of more than 10 new missions designed to be especially challenging, featuring extremely powerful and rare enemy types from the campaign as common enemies and introducing new enemy types such as armored variants of the Colonists. It also introduces more than 30 new weapons among the four classes that can be unlocked by picking up weapon items.

The second mission pack, Additional Mission Pack 2: Super Challenge, was released in Japan on May 17, 2019.

== Reception ==
Reception

Aggregate score
Aggregator	Score
Metacritic	PS4: 72/100; PC: 76/100

Review scores
Publication	Score
Destructoid	6/10
Game Informer	7/10
GameSpot	8/10
IGN	8/10
Push Square	5/10
Shacknews	7/10

Earth Defense Force 5 has an aggregate score of 72/100 on Metacritic based on 44 reviews. IGN called the game a fun "energetic essay on action game design" despite the dated graphics and gave it a rating of 8.3/10. GameSpot also criticized the dated character models and textures but still gave the game a rating of 8 out of 10 citing the storytelling, variety of weapons and characters which leads to replayability and the co-op gameplay. Game Informer rated the game 7 out of 10.

Eric Switzer, writing in The Gamer, stated, "Mitch Hedberg had a joke about how great rice is when you’re really hungry, and you want to eat 2000 of something, and I think the appeal of EDF is similar."

=== Sales ===
By August 2022, total worldwide shipments and digital sales had surpassed one million units.
