= Insect Armageddon =

Insect Armageddon may mean

- Decline in insect populations, a widespread loss of insect numbers and species
- Earth Defense Force: Insect Armageddon, a computer game
