= Zangeki no Reginleiv =

2010 action video game

- Developer: Sandlot
- Publisher: Nintendo
- Directors: Takehiro Homma; Kazuhiro Yoshikawa
- Producers: Shiro Kuroda; Hitoshi Yamagami
- Programmer: Noguchi Toshio
- Artists: Masatsugu Igarashi; Haccan
- Writer: Takehiro Homma
- Composer: Masafumi Takada
- Platform: Wii
- Release: JP: February 11, 2010
- Genre: Action
- Modes: Single-player, multiplayer

Zangeki no Reginleiv (Note: Japanese: 斬撃のREGINLEIV(レギンレイヴ), Hepburn: Zangeki no Reginreivu; lit. Slashing Reginleiv) is a 2010 action video game developed by Sandlot and published by Nintendo for the Wii exclusively in Japan. The story, which is based on Norse mythology, follows the divine warriors Freyr and Freyja in their war against the Jötunn, which heralds the coming of Ragnarok. Gameplay is mission-based, following one of the two protagonists as they fight hordes of enemies. Missions can be completed either in single-playing or in four-player co-op. Along with standard controls, the game supported the Wii MotionPlus expansion.

Development of Zangeki no Reginleiv began in 2006, though the concept was pitched to Nintendo before the Wii's launch. The world and characters' Norse origins were chosen due to the system's uncertain visual identity. The last year of production was turbulent due to requests from Nintendo about the controls and inclusion of co-op. It was the first Nintendo-published game given the "D" rating by Japan's CERO rating system. The game was among the best-selling Wii titles of the year in Japan, but was met with mixed reviews in both Japan and overseas.

== Gameplay ==
A mission in Zangeki no Reginleiv, featuring four players in the online co-op mode

Zangeki no Reginleiv is an action video game set in a world inspired by Norse mythology. Players take on the role of sibling deities Freyr and Freyja, completing missions that involve defeating waves of enemy troops. The game has two control options: the Classic Controller or the Wii Remote and Nunchuk. The latter also incorporates use of the Wii MotionPlus expansion, allowing players to use weapons by mimicking actions, such as slashing with a sword or drawing a bow. There are five difficulty settings: Easy, Normal, Hard, Hardest, and Inferno, with each ascending difficulty being unlocked upon clearing a mission on their next lowest.

The game is divided into missions, with some capped by story cutscenes. Gameplay takes place in open areas populated by enemies. The two characters have different skills; Freyr is a melee-based character who primarily wields swords, while Freyja is strong with ranged weapons and magic. Before each of the game's 63 missions, the player selects up to two weapons for the character to use, and is given a story summary and win conditions. Some missions lock the player to one character, but others allow either Freyr or Freyja to be used. The player character is also outfitted with armour, and has two metres for characters: health (HP) and magic points (MP).

When moving, the characters move at a standard walking pace, with a dash move for speed or dodging attacks triggered by shaking the Nunchuk. During battle, players use their equipped weapon to defeat enemies and boss characters that appear on the field, with each of the five different weapon types being more or less effective on enemies. One of the core elements of combat is dismembering enemies, which is a key tactic for killing larger types. Up to 300 weapons are unlocked by collecting crystals dropped by enemies when they are killed and some body parts are severed. Weapons range from standard swords and axe to bows and magic staves, which fire explosive projectiles that can damage both enemies and allied units. Weapons also have a skill tree, which requires crystals to unlock new abilities. Using some weapons drains MP, which, alongside HP, can be replenished with specific crystal types in missions.

The game can be played either in single-player with the assistance of non-playable characters, or online-exclusive co-operative multiplayer. The multiplayer host can tweak the mission type to narrow which players will be joining. There are checks to ensure participants have equivalent weapons and armour to the host to prevent mismatching, and story missions are marked for players who have not reached them in their version of the game. In the game's co-op mode, up to four players connect through the Wii's wi-fi system, and can prepare for missions using an in-game lobby. During gameplay, players coordinate and communicate through shouts triggered using the Wii Remote's D-pad, and in-game alerts if a character is low on health. Once the mission ends, the multiplayer host can set up another mission.

== Plot ==
In the world of Midgard, the Jötunn, a race whom the gods of Asgard imprisoned after a prolonged war, attacks humanity. In response, Asgard dispatches the twin deities Freyr and Freyja to aid humanity in defeating the giants. As the battles escalate, it becomes clear that the apocalypse Ragnarok is imminent, as despite their best efforts, Freyr and Freyja are unable to stop the Jötunn's advance. The situation is worsened by the emerging armies of Niflheim and Muspelheim and three demonic weapons whom Loki created during an earlier war with the giants. Asgard is eventually assaulted, leading to the death of all the gods except Freyr and Freyja, followed by the emergence of the Fire Jötunn Surtr. Although Surtr is defeated, the world is left in ruin, but Freyja uses her powers to restore the world and humanity. The post-credits scene shows a modern world, where the gods have reincarnated as humans.

== Development ==
Sandlot, best known for their work on the Earth Defense Force series, first pitched the concept of Zangeki no Reginleiv to Nintendo in 2004 alongside a project for the Nintendo DS called Chōsōjū Mecha MG. Nintendo producer Hitoshi Yamagami was wary of such a large pitch, so he agreed that the developer would make Chōsōjū Mecha MG and then go on to Zangeki no Reginleiv. When production of Chōsōjū Mecha MG finished in 2006, the team were given the go-ahead to work on Zangeki no Reginleiv, though both sides were wary of its scale. Originally the plan was for only 100 weapons to feature, but as the team became familiar with the Wii hardware, the number tripled. In 2009, a year before the planned release, Nintendo asked Sandlot to include online co-op—which the team had never tried before—then control options for the Classic Controller and the Wii MotionPlus. These additional elements put a lot of strain on the team, with Yamagami describing it as a "dark year" for the team. A point of contention with Nintendo during the final six months was allowing a player to dismember enemies. Instead of cutting it altogether, Sandlot and Nintendo rationalised that since the violence was against hostile supernatural beings, it did not go against Nintendo's policy of not showing excessive violence against people.

The early concept focused simply on making a fun game where players could slash at enemies, with the setting being a secondary consideration. Writer and director Takehiro Homma initially considered ancient Japan and a modern-day setting, but settled on a mythological setting to better explain the fantastic feats on display. Norse mythology was chosen as the world's base due to lacking a distinct visual identity when compared to Greek mythology. With this in mind, levels were designed to reflect the topography of the mythos as much as possible. The main characters were designed by Haccan. Art director Masatsugu Igarashi brought Haccan onto the project due to liking his human character designs. Character model design was assisted by Optimo Graphico, an outsourcing company also working on Xenoblade Chronicles. The music was composed by Masafumi Takada. Different voice clips were recorded for different battle situations, with the number and harshness causing the actors' voices to become hoarse by the end of recording.

== Release ==
The game was first announced at a special Nintendo press event in 2008 under the provisional title Dynamic Zan, with a planned release for the following year. It was re-introduced under its official title in November 2009, releasing in Japan on February 11, 2010. To promote the game, Nintendo partnered with media retailer Tsutaya to loan trial versions to customers from January 21 until release. This was the first time Nintendo ever released a demo or trial version of a game. It was later reissued for Wii U through the Virtual Console on February 18, 2015. Zangeki no Reginleiv was not localised for Western territories, remaining exclusive to Japan. While no official reasons were given, it was speculated to be due to the high violence and Sandlot's niche Western market.

Zangeki no Reginleiv was the first Nintendo-published game to be rated "D" by Japan's CERO rating body, equivalent to the North American ESRB "Mature" rating. By this point, Nintendo had several third-party developers and publishers creating mature games for the Wii, but Zangeki no Reginleiv was their first self-published work. In response to this growing number of mature titles, Nintendo decided to create new black-edged packaging for such titles so as to help consumers identify more mature titles in the store at a glance. Zangeki no Reginleiv was the first title to feature this black design.

== Reception ==
Reception

Review scores
| Publication | Score |
|---|---|
| Eurogamer | 5/10 |
| Famitsu | 8/10, 7/10, 7/10, 6/10 |
| NGamer | 73% |

During its first week on sale, Zangeki no Reginleiv reached ninth place in sales charts, with initial sales of nearly 23,000 units and a high sale ratio. During that time, it was one of the most played titles on the Wii, earning a "Platinum" rank from players. The game was the fourteenth highest-selling Wii release of 2010, with sales of over 53,000 units.

Japanese gaming magazine Famitsu praised the implementation of the Wii MotionPlus and the general flow of gameplay, but the four reviewers each faulted the game for camera and control issues, and growing repetition. Japanese website Game Watch Impress praised the gameplay, but noted a lack of depth and frequent control problems. Keza MacDonald of Eurogamer was fairly mixed, enjoying the gameplay style despite control issues, but finding the story flimsy and criticizing the graphics and cutscenes.

The magazine NGamer found there was not enough in the game to justify its use of the Wii MotionPlus, but referred to it as mindless fun for people able to import it. Siliconera's Spencer Yip found the controls difficult to handle, but praised the coop multiplayer and enjoyed the gameplay style. In a list of anticipated Wii titles, Cubed 3 lauded the game's potential and felt that players would enjoy it due to its style and combat system.
