= GEMBA (studio) =

Japanese animation studio

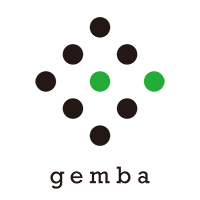
- Native name: 株式会社ゲンバ
- Romanized name: Kabushiki-gaisha Genba
- Type: Kabushiki gaisha
- Industry: Japanese animation
- Founded: April 6, 2006; 20 years ago
- Headquarters: Shinjuku, Tokyo, Japan
- Key people: Hideki Kuraku (representative director)
- Number of employees: 66 (as of April 2024)
- Parent: Digital Frontier (2006–2024)
- Website: www.gemba.co.jp

GEMBA Inc. (Japanese: 株式会社ゲンバ, Hepburn: Kabushiki-gaisha Genba) is a Japanese animation studio that specializes in the production of 3DCG animation and anime.

== Establishment ==
The company was established in 2006 as a sub-contracting studio and subsidiary of Digital Frontier that specialized in 3DCG production. In 2016, Gemba released its first production as a primary contractor, an iteration of Kentaro Miura's Berserk co-animated with 2D studio Millepensee. Despite a decade of experience with 3DCG, the series received harsh criticism towards its CG animation from viewers and critics alike. Reception to the studio's second major production, The Magnificent Kotobuki, has been more positive, contrastly.

== Works ==
=== Anime television series ===
Title	Director(s)	First run start date	First run end date	Eps	Note(s)	Ref(s)
Berserk	Shin Itagaki	July 1, 2016	June 23, 2017	24	Adaptation of a manga by Kentaro Miura. Co-animated with Millepensee. Production co-operation by Liden Films. Sequel to Berserk: The Golden Age Arc.	
The Magnificent Kotobuki	Tsutomu Mizushima	January 13, 2019	March 31, 2019	12	Original work. Production co-operation by Digital Frontier.	

=== Films ===
Title	Director(s)	Released	Runtime	Note(s)	Ref(s)
The Magnificent Kotobuki Complete Edition	Tsutomu Mizushima	September 11, 2020	119 minutes	Original work. Compilation film of the TV series.	
