= Chise Nakamura =

Japanese actress

- 中村知世
- Born: September 11, 1986 (age 38); Fukuoka Prefecture, Japan
- Occupations: Model; actress
- Years active: 2003–2019
- Height: 162 cm (5 ft 4 in)
- Children: 2

Chise Nakamura (中村 知世, Nakamura Chise, September 11, 1986) is a former Japanese actress and gravure idol from Fukuoka, Fukuoka. In 2018, she entered the family register on Monday with a non-industry man three years her senior, and noted that the January 1 date for entering the family register is a reference to the best hand in the Texas hold 'em card game. She retired from the entertainment industry in August 2019.

== Filmography ==
=== Movie roles ===
- Emiko Okamura (Alto Saxophone) in Swing Girls (2004)
- OneChanbara (film) (2008)

=== TV roles ===
- Natsuki Mamiya (Bouken Yellow) in GoGo Sentai Boukenger (2006).
- Matsushiro Hikaru in Mei-chan no Shitsuji (2009).

=== Anime roles ===
- Dragonaut -The Resonance- (2007)
- Penguin Musume Heart (2008)
- Shikabane Hime (2008)
