= Dragonaut: The Resonance =

Japanese anime television series

- Key visual, featuring Jin Kamishina (left) and Toa (right)

ドラゴノーツ -ザ・レゾナンス- (Doragonōtsu -Za Rezonansu)
- Genre: Action; Mecha; Romance
- Created by: Shin'ichi Miyazaki; Gonzo
- Anime television series
- Directed by: Manabu Ono
- Produced by: Masanori Miyake; Masaru Nagai; Naoki Miura
- Written by: Atsushi Maekawa (#1–17); Shigeru Morita (#18–25)
- Music by: Kousuke Yamashita
- Studio: Gonzo
- Licensed by: Crunchyroll (Note: In North America through Crunchyroll, LLC (formerly known as Funimation).)
- Original network: TV Tokyo
- Original run: October 4, 2007 – March 27, 2008
- Episodes: 25 + OVA
- Manga
- Written by: Satoshi Kinoshita
- Published by: Shueisha
- Imprint: Jump Comics SQ.
- Magazine: Jump Square
- Original run: November 2, 2007 – April 4, 2008
- Volumes: 1
- icon

Dragonaut: The Resonance (Japanese: ドラゴノーツ -ザ・レゾナンス-, Hepburn: Doragonōtsu -Za Rezonansu-) is a Japanese anime television series co-produced by Gonzo and Nihon Ad Systems (NAS). It was broadcast for 25 episodes on TV Tokyo from October 2007 to March 2008. An additional original video animation (OVA) episode was released in 2009.

A manga adaptation by Satoshi Kinoshita was serialized in Shueisha's shōnen manga magazine Jump Square from November 2007 to April 2008, with its six chapters collected in a single tankōbon volume.

== Plot ==
Twenty years prior to the story's beginning, an asteroid headed for Earth destroys Pluto. Due to Pluto's destruction, the asteroid, which is dubbed Thanatos, becomes temporarily stagnant in Pluto's orbit. Now, in order to avoid Earth's impending destruction, the International Solarsystem Development Agency (ISDA) works on the "D-Project", and secretly creates weapons called "Dragons" after finding a dragon egg under the ocean. However, they soon find out that the asteroid is not their only threat, as powerful, destructive dragons from Thanatos appear on Earth.

After witnessing what looks like a murder by a strange creature, Jin Kamishina, a lonely 18-year-old boy who lost his family in a shuttle accident two years ago, gets involved with the ISDA and their efforts to battle the dragons from Thanatos. Helping him is Toa, a mysterious girl who saves him from falling to his death after the creature attacks him. As they delve deeper into the mysteries of the dragons, they encounter new friends and enemies, and also develop a closer relationship.

== Production ==
The original concept of Dragonaut: The Resonance was developed by Nihon Ad Systems (NAS). NAS and Gonzo studios, which produced anime series such as Last Exile and Brave Story, co-produced the series, along with a subsidiary of Konami, Konami Digital Entertainment.

On March 24, 2007, at the International Anime Fair in Tokyo, the first promotional image for the anime series was revealed. In addition, series' director Manabu Ono, and two of the series' voice actors, Daisuke Ono and Minori Chihara, attended the fair in order to promote the series. At the time, the complete cast for the anime was not yet assembled as the anime was still in the development stage. In fact, Manabu Ono expected that the series would continue being developed on, even after it begins broadcast in October 2007.

While a majority of series designs are done in 2D animation, the mechanics of the dragons and their corresponding battles are done in 3D computer graphics. However, the dragon battles are the only confrontations done in CG, as character fights are in 2D since the director believes that highspeed character movements are best expressed in that form.

== Media ==
=== Anime ===
Directed by Manabu Ono and co-produced by Gonzo and Nihon Ad Systems (NAS), Dragonaut: The Resonance was broadcast for 25 episodes on TV Tokyo from October 4, 2007, to March 27, 2008. The episodes were collected in nine DVDs, released from January 23 to September 24, 2008; an additional 26th episode was bundled with the last DVD.

In North America, the series was licensed by Funimation. They produced an English dub, and released the 26 episodes on two DVDs on November 3 and December 29, 2009. A complete DVD set was released on December 28, 2010.

==== Music ====
There are three pieces of theme music used in the anime series: one opening theme and two closing themes. The opening theme, "perfect blue", is performed, composed, and written by the J-pop group Jazzin' Park. ATSUMI also performed the piece alongside Jazzin' Park, as a guest vocal. The two ending themes are "Rain Of Love", which is performed by Yukari Fukui and composed by Hiroshi Takaki, with the lyrics written by Shoko Fujibayashi, and "Fight or Flight", which is performed by Yū Kobayashi.

On November 21, 2007, Jazzin' Park and Yukari Fukui each released a four track single. The titles of the theme songs are used as the titles for its corresponding single, which each contains an instrumental version of its theme song, along with at least one different song sung by the artist. Yū Kobayashi's second single, "Fight or Flight", also contained four tracks, and was released on January 23, 2008. Yukari Fukui's "Rain Of Love" is also the second single she has released, while Jazzin' Park's "perfect blue" is the first single they have ever released.

=== Manga ===
Manga volume cover

A manga adaptation by Satoshi Kinoshita was serialized for six chapters in Shueisha's shōnen manga magazine Jump Square from November 2, 2007, (Note: It started in the magazine's December 2007 issue (debut issue), released on November 2 of that same year.) to April 4, 2008. (Note: It finished in the magazine's May 2008 issue, released on April 4 of that same year.) Its chapters were collected in a single tankōbon volume, released on May 2, 2008.

=== Internet radio ===
An internet radio broadcast began airing on September 5, 2007. The Dragonaut Station ISDA Information Agency centered around three voice actors from the anime answering e-mail questions about the series. The three female voice actors are Yukari Fukui, Yū Kobayashi, and Chise Nakamura, who voices Saki Kurata, Ryōko Kakei, and Megumi Jinguuji, respectively. Junichi Suwabe, Takuma Takewaka, Daisuke Ono, Eiji Maruyama, who voices Gio, Raina Cromwell, Jin Kamishina, and Amadeus, respectively, were guests during separate sessions. The broadcast was hosted by Onsen, an internet radio station.

== Reception ==
Both of the first two DVD collections released in North America by Funimation have been reviewed. The reviews have generally run from average to above average.

- The first DVD collection (episodes 1–13) was reviewed by Chris Beveridge of Mania.com, who gave it an overall grade of "C+". Theron Martin of Anime News Network awarded grades from "D+" (story) to "B+" (music).
- The second DVD collection (episodes 14–26) was reviewed by Chris Beveridge, who gave it an overall grade of "C". Theron Martin awarded grades from "B−" (story) to "B+" (music).
