= Robot Alchemic Drive =

2002 video game

- North American box art
- Developer: Sandlot
- Publisher: Enix
- Director: Takehiro Honma
- Producers: Wataru Higuchi; Tomoya Asano
- Designer: Ryuji Fukuyo
- Programmers: Toshio Noguchi; Yoshihiro Ito
- Artists: Masatsugu Igarashi; Toshihiro Kawamoto
- Writer: Takehiro Honma
- Composer: Masafumi Takada
- Platform: PlayStation 2
- Release: JP: August 29, 2002; NA: November 5, 2002
- Genre: Action
- Modes: Single-player, multiplayer

Robot Alchemic Drive or R.A.D. (Note: Known in Japan as Gigantic Drive (Japanese: ギガンティックドライブ, Hepburn: Gigantikku Doraibu)) is a 2002 action-adventure mecha fighting video game developed by Sandlot and published by Enix for the PlayStation 2. It shares many similarities to Sandlot's earlier action-adventure mecha fighting title Remote Control Dandy. The game is set during an alien invasion in Japan, with players controlling a giant robot to combat the aliens as humanity's last line of defense.

Created as an homage to the super robot anime of the 1970s and 1980s, Robot Alchemic Drive is unique among mecha games in that most gameplay is not directly controlling the mecha (such as in Armored Core) or in combat sequences (such as Sandlot's similarly-themed Earth Defense Force), but rather by controlling the actual human pilot of the mecha, with visual novel-like dialogue progressing the story between fights.

Robot Alchemic Drive was released in Japan on August 29, 2002, and in North America on November 5, to generally positive reviews, but did not perform particularly well commercially and is now considered a niche title.

== Gameplay ==
The protagonists that the player may choose between are two males and one female (Naoto Tsukioka, Ryo Tsukioka, or Yui Tsukioka), but the character is only referred to as "Chairman" and the choice bears no impact on gameplay. There are three different robots to choose from: Vertical Fortress Vavel, Airborne Dominator Laguiole, and Gllang the Castlekeep.

- Vavel has two modes, Volcanic and Genesis mode.
- Laguiole can turn into a plane, and his mode similar to Vavel's is the Demon Sword Desecrator mode, which releases two short laser-like daggers from the robot's wrists.
- Gllang can turn into a vehicle/tank being. His special mode is the Warhammer Sanctifier. On his arms, two big blocks of metal alloy are released and become mallets. These special modes only become available after Level 40: Valhalla Dawning. These modes will only last 180 seconds, or 3 minutes.

It is possible throughout the game to affect the story of a particular character. For example, Nanao's storyline may be affected by the destruction of certain buildings while on missions.

Enemies, for a short number of episodes, are the same. The only difference is the change in color and weapons. They become smarter and more aware of what the main character is doing as the player progresses through the story. Players also unlock all of the Volgara in the two-player versus mode after beating the game with two of the three protagonists.

== Plot ==
As the seventeen-year-old sole inheritor to the Tsukioka family and their bankrupt weapons company, the game introduces the player to a world where all crewed space exploration projects have been put on hold indefinitely due to a material called "Space Nectar" that poisons and kills any organic life in space. Earth is safe because of its atmosphere, but it seems that humanity is doomed to an isolated existence. When machines known as Volgara begin destroying the Earth, the player must pilot the only weapon on Earth capable of standing against the invaders. Along the way, lives will be changed, history will be made, and the origins of the Volgara will be revealed.

== Characters ==
The Hero/Heroine: The player-controlled character, a seventeen-year-old junior at the public Senjo High School and the sole heir of the prestigious Tsukioka clan that has gone bankrupt. Tsukioka Industries, a weapons manufacturer, collapsed while funding the construction of the Meganites, which the hero must control to save his/her hometown. There are three characters selectable: Naoto, Yui, and Ryo, but their stories are all similar.

- Naoto Tsukioka (月岡 直人, Tsukioka Naoto) Voiced by: Kenichi Suzumura (Japanese); Ryan Halper (English)

A cheerful young man with a strong sense of justice. He is athletically gifted, and is sought out by many of his school's sport teams, but he prefers to spend his free time alone rather than associating with a particular group. His feelings toward the Trillenium Committee and the Meganite are close to hatred, since he blames them for his father's death and the fall of the Tsukioka clan. As a result, he is torn between protecting his loved ones and controlling the Meganites.

- Ryo Tsukioka (月岡 涼, Tsukioka Ryō) Voiced by: Susumu Chiba (Japanese); Michael Teppner (English)

A cool and reserved young man who excels academically and rides a motorcycle as a hobby. Despite his appearance, he is shockingly agile and the toughest fighter at Senjo School. He tends to be aloof and emotionally distant; while he is popular with girls at school, he shows little interest in them. Though he recognizes that the Tsukioka family's out-of-control business spending is to blame for their collapse, he remains conflicted towards the Meganites and feels stifled as the interim Chairman of the Trillenium Committee.

- Yui Tsukioka (月岡 結衣, Tsukioka Yui) Voiced by: Yukana (Japanese); Jessica Halper (English)

A compassionate and attractive young woman adored by the male students at her school. Her outlandish attire comes from her love of robots, particularly the popular super robot anime and live action shows in the 1970s. Unwilling to accept the development costs of the Meganites drove the Tsukioka family to bankruptcy, Yui dismisses them as antiquated junk metal.

Nanao Misaki (三咲 奈々穂, Misaki Nanaho) Voiced by: Moyu Arashima (Japanese); Ashley Erke (English)

A childhood friend of the hero. Her grandmother is killed by a Volgara, which leads to her early animosity towards robots. After her grandmother died, she finds herself living on her own and working to support herself. She means well, but had a tendency to overlook her own boundaries and work herself into a severe fatigue. In a secret path of the story (where Masaru donates enormous funds to CPF), it is revealed that Nanao is Masaru's sister who escaped along with her grandmother from the family's involvement with making weapons. Depending on the player's actions, she can end up being the main character's love interest or leave Senjo if her workplace keeps getting destroyed.

Dr. Hourai (蓬莱 博士, Hōrai-hakase) Voiced by: Unshō Ishizuka (Japanese); Ed Dolan (English)

A brilliant but insane scientist who foresaw the advent of the Volgara and discovered the Nectar Radiance that prevents space travel. He gives the hero the remote control used to operate the Meganites. It was revealed later in the story that he knew everything about the Volgara and the true nature of the Meganites and their Alchemic Drive.

Dr. Herman Wiltz (ヘルマン・ウィルツ, Heruman Wirutsu) Voiced by: Jūrōta Kosugi (Japanese); Michael Teppner (English)

A German scientist who created the Alchemic Drive that generates energy for the Meganites. He offers assistance to the hero during their fights with the Volgara. He is also in charge of upgrading the Meganites.

Keiko Konan (木南 薫子, Konan Keiko) Voiced by: Satsuki Yukino (Japanese); Cheryl Serio (English)

A radio operator who also assists the player in combat with advice, alongside Dr. Wiltz. She is quite popular among the CPF crew. She lives in a condo near the Foundation headquarters. If her condo is destroyed in the war, she moves to the HQ.

Saki Kyono (京野 沙希, Kyōno Saki) Voiced by: Yū Asakawa (Japanese); Emily Mackintosh (English)

The financial manager for the foundation. She introduces the player to the concept of earning monetary rewards for completing missions. She is also in charge of providing upgradable equipment for the player. She seems to have a heart disease (though the circumstances suggest that she's simply grossly overreacting to any loss of awards during the first mission where they are available).

Ellen Bulnose (エレン・ブルノーズ, Eren Burunōzu) Voiced by: Yuka Imai (Japanese); Rebbeca Nash (English)

The heiress to the Bulnose weapons company in France. She was engaged to the hero (or close friends if the player selects Yui), but dropped out of contact with the hero after Tsukioka went bankrupt. She reappears as a member of the Evacuation Guidance Group after having a falling out with her parents. She is also one of the characters that Naoto or Ryo end up dating at the end of the game. Otherwise, she will simply take over the Bulnose Industries and continue with her arranged engagement to Masaru.

Masaru Misaki (三咲 勝, Misaki Masaru) Voiced by: Atsushi Kisaichi (Japanese); Edward Davis (English)

The heir to Misaki Heavy Industries, a company that thrived in the ruin of Tsukioka, and Ellen's new fiance. He berates the player for failure to protect his company from harm during battle. If his buildings are continually destroyed, his engagement with Ellen will end. Despite his unpleasant attitude, he is actually devoted to the elimination of Volgara threat. If a certain story path is followed, Misaki will donate 100 billion yens to the CPF, which can be used for upgrades etc or he will not help the player to defeat Asmodeus if his buildings keep getting destroyed.

Tomoe Kawasaki (川崎 友絵, Kawasaki Tomoe) Voiced by: Sayuri Yamauchi (Japanese); Beckie Wang (English)

An anchorwoman for BNN News, her main purpose is providing the player with an evaluation of the aftermath on the battlefield after the completion of a mission.

Mika Banhara (番原 美香, Banhara Mika) Voiced by: Akiko Hiramatsu (Japanese); Satoko Iwahara (English)

A field reporter for BNN, she makes her big break in the media by covering the events of the war against the Volgara. Her work can be seen during the game with breaking news reports given during the middle of battle. In the later part of the game she is injured which left her heartbroken, but she regains her self-confidence after she is saved by the main character. Although she survives the war in the canon ending, she can die in one of the missions if her news chopper is hit by a Volgara or by player's Meganite.

Souya (奏也, Sōya) Voiced by: Katsuyuki Konishi (Japanese); Jason Ness (English)

A mysterious young man who appears before the player. He is revealed to be Dr. Hourai's son and controls a black Vavel called Valdor. Although he helps the main character in many missions, he is actually ordered by his father to observe Vavel and help it to activate its "Genocide Mode" (a secret command which will order Vavel to annihilate half of the human race, so the Earth can restore itself) when the time is right. He initially sees the error of his father's ideas and begins to fully support the main character. If the main character is Yui, she and Souya might end up dating at the end of the game.

Captain Shin'ichiro Kurosugi (黒杉 信一郎, Kurosugi Shin'ichirō) Voiced by: Jōji Nakata (Japanese); Ed Dolan (English); and Private Takeshi Yamano (山野 武, Yamano Takeshi) Voiced by: Makoto Higo (Japanese); Edward Davis (English)

Two JSDF tank drivers that appear in many of the missions to support the main character with their Type 90 tank. While Kurosugi is eager to go into battle to defend the civilians, Yamano is afraid that they will be killed by the Volgara and tries to convince the Captain to run away. They survive in the canon ending, but they can be killed in the battle against the Volgara if the player doesn't protect them.

Kyoji Otawara (大田原 恭二, Ōtawara Kyōji) Voiced by: Takashi Nagasako (Japanese); Ed Dolan (English)

The CEO of the corrupt Otawara Enterprises, he endangers Nanao's employment on a few occasions during the game.

== Development ==
Robot Alchemic Drive was developed by Sandlot, a company created by former employees of Human Entertainment. The game's engine was originally intended to be for a game based on the tokusatsu series Tekkōki Mikazuki and even received a playable demo, though the full game was later cancelled, likely due to the commercial failure of the show itself. Robot Alchemic Drive's gameplay and controls are heavily inspired by Remote Control Dandy (1999), a game that was previously developed by Sandlot and published by Human Entertainment for the PlayStation.

The characters of the game were designed by Toshihiro Kawamoto, the character designer of the Cowboy Bebop anime series. Development of Robot Alchemic Drive took approximately 16 to 18 months to complete. Much of the game's use of incredibly large robots was inspired by anime. The game was aimed at both casual and hardcore gamers, as well as fans of action games and robot games. The hardest part of development was to handle the sense of scale involved with the robots.

The game's English localization was done by Nob Ogasawara, who also coined the game's English title. The game's English release was produced on a small budget, with Enix America hiring a local voiceover studio named World Line Technologies that usually produced corporate videos.

== Reception ==
Reception

Aggregate score
Aggregator	Score
Metacritic	79 of 100

Review scores
Publication	Score
Electronic Gaming Monthly	8 of 10
Famitsu	30 of 40
Game Informer	7.75 of 10
GameSpot	7.5 of 10
GameSpy	4 of 5
GameZone	8.5 of 10
IGN	7.3 of 10
Official U.S. PlayStation Magazine	4 of 5
PlayStation: The Official Magazine	8 of 10
X-Play	4 of 5

The game received "generally favorable reviews" according to the review aggregation website Metacritic. In Japan, Famitsu gave it a score of two eights and two sevens for a total of 30 out of 40. GamePro called it "a weird high-concept wonder that actually works, and it's about as close as you're gonna get to playing Neon Genesis Evangelion: The Game. Hopefully there'll be better long-range weapon control and a more polished Graphics Alchemic Drive written into the second season." (Note: GamePro gave the game three 4/5 scores for graphics, sound, and control, and 4.5/5 for fun factor.)

By its second week of sale in Japan, Robot Alchemic Drive had sold 17,888 units.
