= Onechanbara =

Series of action video games

- Wii variant to the first Onechanbara logo (North American release)
- Genres: Action-adventure, hack and slash
- Developer: Tamsoft
- Publisher: D3 Publisher
- Platforms: PlayStation 2, Xbox 360, Nintendo Wii, PlayStation Portable, PlayStation 3, PlayStation 4, Microsoft Windows
- First release: Simple 2000 Series Vol. 61: The OneeChanbara; August 7, 2004
- Latest release: OneeChanbara Origin; December 5, 2019

OneChanbara (お姉チャンバラ), initially defined The OneeChanbara (THE お姉チャンバラ), is a series of action-adventure hack and slash video games originally developed by Tamsoft for D3 Publisher's Simple 2000 series. The title is a portmanteau of the Japanese words onee-chan (お姉ちゃん; lit. "big sister", but also a colloquialism for a young adult woman) and chanbara (チャンバラ; "sword fighting"). The series centers around Aya, a cowgirl who wears a scarf and wields a katana, who is pitted against hordes of zombies and other monsters.

== Gameplay ==
Players guide their characters through the stages, completing tasks while fighting through enemies. The player-character's weapon becomes progressively covered in blood, causing their attacks to be slower and to inflict less damage, even getting stuck in enemies if it gets too bad. This is represented by a "Blood Meter" showing how dirty the weapon is. To prevent this, players must actively clean off their sword to keep the blood meter from filling up.

In addition, there is also the "Blood Lust" meter. As a character kills enemies, this meter starts to fill. Once the meter is full, the character will go into a "blood frenzy". This gives the character an increase in attack power, but drains health. To recover from a blood frenzy, the player must use statue items, which are dropped by dead enemies. Additionally each level will contain a large statue. Going to the large statue will remove the blood frenzy and also recover any lost health.

== Games ==
=== Main series ===
Game	Details
Simple 2000 Series Vol. 61: The OneeChanbara Original release dates: JP: August 26, 2004; EU: October 21, 2005	Release years by system: 2004 – PlayStation 2
Simple 2000 Series Vol. 61: The OneeChanbara Original release dates: JP: August 26, 2004; EU: October 21, 2005	Notes: Released in Europe under the name Zombie Zone.
Simple 2000 Series Vol. 90: The OneeChanbara 2 Original release dates: JP: December 22, 2005	Release years by system: 2005 – PlayStation 2
Simple 2000 Series Vol. 90: The OneeChanbara 2 Original release dates: JP: December 22, 2005	Notes: A sequel to the original game. The first to feature Aya's sister Saki as a playable character.
Onechanbara: Bikini Samurai Squad Original release dates: JP: December 14, 2006; NA: February 10, 2009; EU: February 27, 2009	Release years by system: 2006 – Xbox 360
Onechanbara: Bikini Samurai Squad Original release dates: JP: December 14, 2006; NA: February 10, 2009; EU: February 27, 2009	Notes: The first game in the series to be localized in North America and support online features.; Backwards compatible on Xbox One and Xbox Series X.
OneChanbara: Bikini Zombie Slayers Original release dates: JP: February 7, 2008; NA: February 10, 2009; EU: February 27, 2009; AU: March 27, 2009	Release years by system: 2008 – Nintendo Wii
OneChanbara: Bikini Zombie Slayers Original release dates: JP: February 7, 2008; NA: February 10, 2009; EU: February 27, 2009; AU: March 27, 2009	Notes: In some regions, this release came packaged with a CD of music from the previous OneeChanbara games.
OneeChanbara Z: Kagura Original release dates: JP: January 19, 2012	Release years by system: 2012 – Xbox 360
Onechanbara Z2: Chaos Original release dates: JP: October 30, 2014; NA: July 21, 2015; EU: August 28, 2015	Release years by system: 2014 – PlayStation 4; 2016 – Microsoft Windows

=== Updated versions ===
Game	Details
Zombie Hunters (Zombie Zone: The Other Side) Original release dates: JP: June 23, 2005; EU: March 23, 2007	Release years by system: 2005 – PlayStation 2
Zombie Hunters (Zombie Zone: The Other Side) Original release dates: JP: June 23, 2005; EU: March 23, 2007	Notes: An upgraded version of the first game including two new characters: D3 Publisher idol Riho Futaba and her younger sister Makoto.
Zombie Hunters 2 Original release dates: JP: June 29, 2006; EU: September 28, 2007	Release years by system: 2006 – PlayStation 2
Zombie Hunters 2 Original release dates: JP: June 29, 2006; EU: September 28, 2007	Notes: An upgraded version of The OneeChanbara 2 featuring returning characters Riho and Makoto, as well as the female warriors Kiku and Hana, the stars of Dragon Sisters.
OneeChanbara Z: Kagura with NoNoNo! Original release dates: JP: November 7, 2013	Release years by system: 2013 – PlayStation 3
OneeChanbara Z: Kagura with NoNoNo! Original release dates: JP: November 7, 2013	Notes: An upgraded version of OneeChanbara Z: Kagura including a new character: Nonono from the Dream Club series.
Onee Chanbara ORIGIN Original release dates: JP: December 5, 2019; WW: October 14, 2020	Release years by system: 2019 – PlayStation 4; 2020 – Microsoft Windows
Onee Chanbara ORIGIN Original release dates: JP: December 5, 2019; WW: October 14, 2020	Notes: Remake of the first two games in the series.

=== Spin-offs ===
Game	Details
The OneeChanbara Mobile Original release dates: JP: January 11, 2007	Release years by system: 2007 – Mobile
The OneeChanbara Mobile Original release dates: JP: January 11, 2007	Notes: Rail shooter featuring illustrations by character designer Kengo Yonekura.
Z.P.F. Anna: Onechanbara Special Original release dates: JP: July 1, 2008	Release years by system: 2008 – Mobile
Z.P.F. Anna: Onechanbara Special Original release dates: JP: July 1, 2008	Notes: Rail shooter spinoff featuring Anna as the main character.
OneeChanbara Special Original release dates: JP: March 31, 2011	Release years by system: 2011 – PlayStation Portable
School Girl/Zombie Hunter Original release dates: JP: January 12, 2017; WW: November 17, 2017	Release years by system: 2017 – PlayStation 4; 2018 – Microsoft Windows

== Other media ==
Aya, the series' main character, has also appeared in Simple 2000 Series Vol. 91: The All*Star Kakutou Matsuri (released as All-Star Fighters in Europe in March 2007), a fighting game featuring characters from many different Simple 2000 series releases.

Game	Details
Onechanbara: The Movie 2008 – Live action film	Notes: Live-action film directed by Yohei Fukuda starring Eri Otoguro, Manami Hashimoto, and Tomohiro Waki.; The theme song is "69 Balloons" by Aural Vampire.
Chanbara Beauty: The Movie - Vortex 2009 – Live action film	Notes: Straight-to-DVD sequel to the 2008 film.
OneeChanbara Kurenai 2009 – Manga	Notes: Published by Champion RED Comics.

== Reception ==
Aggregate review scores
Game	Metacritic
Onechanbara: Bikini Samurai Squad	39/100 (X360)
OneChanbara: Bikini Zombie Slayers	55/100 (Wii)
Onechanbara Z2: Chaos	57/100 (PS4)
SG/ZH: School Girl Zombie Hunter	59/100 (PS4)
Onee Chanbara ORIGIN	69/100 (PS4); 62/100 (PC)
