= OneChanbara (film) =

- Movie poster for the film
- Directed by: Yōhei Fukuda
- Written by: Yōhei Fukuda; Yasutoshi Murakawa
- Based on: Onechanbara by D3Publisher
- Starring: Eri Otoguro; Chise Nakamura; Manami Hashimoto
- Music by: Chika Fujino; Hideki Ikari
- Distributed by: JollyRoger
- Release date: 26 April 2008
- Running time: 86 minutes
- Country: Japan
- Language: Japanese

OneChanbara (お姉チャンバラ, Onee Chanbara) is a 2008 film written and directed by Yōhei Fukuda. The film is based on the Onechanbara video game series. It had a full theatrical release in Japan and it was shown in New York at the Asian Film Festival on June 20 and June 25, 2008, under the title of Chanbara Beauty. A straight-to-DVD sequel entitled お姉チャンバラ THE MOVIE vortex (or OneChanbara: Bikini Zombie Slayers in North America) was released in 2009.

== Cast ==
- Eri Otoguro as Aya, the protagonist
- Chise Nakamura as Saki, Aya's younger sister
- Manami Hashimoto as Reiko
- Ai Hazuki as Maria

== DVD releases ==
The DVD was released in Japan on September 26, 2008. The first press edition of the DVD had a 3D cover which flicks between Aya from the games and the live action portrayal. The film has been picked up for release in Germany, United States and the United Kingdom. It was released in Germany on 26 June 2009, carrying the title Zombie Killer – Sharp as a Sword, Sexy as Hell. Tokyo Shock in the United States released the film on DVD under the title Onechanbara: Bikini Samurai Squad on August 25, 2009. Manga Entertainment is releasing the DVD in the UK on September 7, 2009, under the festival title of Chanbara Beauty.

== See also ==
- List of films based on video games
