= School Girl/Zombie Hunter =

2017 video game

SG/ZH: School Girl/Zombie Hunter
- Japanese PS4 cover featuring Sayuri Akiha, Mayaya Himeji, Risa Kubota, Rei Kanazaki, and Enami Kamijo
- Developer: Tamsoft
- Publishers: JP: D3 Publisher; NA/EU: Aksys Games
- Director: Tatsuya Ona
- Designer: Maho Kaitō
- Programmer: Masataka Furukawa
- Artist: Tsukasa Yokoyama
- Engine: Unreal Engine 4
- Platforms: PlayStation 4, Microsoft Windows
- Release: PlayStation 4: JP: January 12, 2017; NA: November 17, 2017; EU: November 17, 2017
- Genre: Third-person shooter
- Modes: Single-player, multiplayer

SG/ZH: School Girl/Zombie Hunter is a 2017 third-person shooter video game from D3 Publisher, developed by Tamsoft for the PlayStation 4. It has been described as a "Zombie Panic Shooting Action" title and set within the Onechanbara series, in a private institute attacked by zombies while five young girl students have to fight for their survival. The game was released in Japan on 12 January 2017 and overseas later that year, and was ported to Windows in 2018, released on Steam.

== Gameplay ==
Gameplay screenshot on PS4

Set in the Kirisaku (私立霧索高等学校, Shiritsu Kirisaku Kotogakko) Japanese private institute, the game involves a sudden massive zombie invasion of the school. Just five young girls managed to survive but they have to fight against hordes of horrific zombies with a large amount of weapons from common Baseball bats to powerful machine guns, sniper rifles or rocket launchers. Each character has her own skills like special martial arts. When the girls are in serious danger they can throw their costumes to zombies to divert zombie's attention.

== Playable characters ==
Sayuri Akiba (秋葉サユリ)
Voiced by: Asuka Ōgame
She is a 17 year old girl who loves robot anime cartoons: she is also one of five main protagonists. Akiba is very skilled with a handgun, and is also a Kendo student.

Risa Kubota (久保田リサ)
Voiced by: Saori Ōnishi
She lost both her parents when she was very young so she grew up in Akiba's family. She is 17. Risa is very skilled with assault rifles and she is able to use Naginata.

Mayaya Himeji (姫路まやや)
Voiced by: Chinami Hashimoto
She is a close friend of Enami and her habit is to hide her true emotions. She is 16, the youngest of the group. Mayaya is very skilled with sub-machine guns and she used to be in the softball team.

Enami Kamijo (神城エナミ)
Voiced by: Sayaka Senbongi
She is a very good student with perfect scores. She is 18, the eldest of the group. Enami is skilled with sniper rifles and she used to be part of the soccer team.

Rei Kanazaki (金崎レイ)
Voiced by: Kaori Ishihara
She used to be an idol when she was younger. She is 17. Rei is very skilled with shotguns and she is also able at Karate martial art.

== Other characters ==
Anna
Voiced by: Kazusa Amagai
Coming from the Onechanbara series, Anna is a special forces member focused on zombies. She joins the rescue force.

Ren
Voiced by: Shunpei Fukuma
A main antagonist of this game. He is a mysterious unidentified sentient zombie who could be the cause behind the zombies' invasion of the school. Nobody knows his true intentions and he is hidden inside the institute.

== Reception ==
Reception

Aggregate score
Aggregator	Score
Metacritic	(PS4) 59/100

Review scores
Publication	Score
Destructoid	7/10
Push Square	4/10
MANiAC	(PS4) 55%
