= The Magnificent Kotobuki =

Japanese anime television series

- Anime key visual
- 荒野のコトブキ飛行隊; Kōya no Kotobuki Hikōtai
- Genre: Action, adventure, steampunk
- Created by: GEMBA
- Written by: Michiko Yokote
- Directed by: Tsutomu Mizushima
- Voices of: Sayumi Suzushiro; Aoi Koga; Eri Kitamura; Nao Tōyama; Asami Seto
- Music by: Shirō Hamaguchi
- Opening theme: Sora no ne" by Zaq
- Ending theme: "Tsubasa wo Motsu Mono-tachi" by Kotobuki Squadron
- Country of origin: Japan
- Original language: Japanese
- No. of seasons: 1
- No. of episodes: 12 (list of episodes)

Production
- Producers: Shōhei Itō; Kensuke Ōtani; Ryōya Arisawa; Yasuhiro Ebinuma
- Cinematography: Ryo Horibe (Note: Episode 12 only); Toru Shinozaki
- Animator: GEMBA
- Editor: Masato Yoshitake
- Running time: 24 minutes
- Production companies: Bandai Namco Entertainment; Bandai Namco Arts; Bandai Spirits; Digital Frontier

Original release
- Network: Tokyo MX, TVA, MBS, BS11
- Release: January 13 – March 31, 2019

Related
- Light novel

Kōya no Kotobuki Hikōtai Sen Ichiya
- Written by: Andou Keiji
- Illustrated by: Tasuku Sugie
- Published by: Shueisha
- Imprint: Jump J-Books
- Published: June 19, 2019
- Manga
- Written by: Muneaki Taoka
- Illustrated by: Tasuku Sugie
- Published by: Shueisha
- Magazine: Shonen Jump+
- Original run: April 24, 2019 – March 25, 2020
- Volumes: 1
- Anime film

The Magnificent Kotobuki Complete Edition
- Released: September 11, 2020
- Runtime: 119 minutes

The Magnificent Kotobuki (Japanese: 荒野のコトブキ飛行隊, Hepburn: Kōya no Kotobuki Hikōtai; lit. 'Kotobuki Squadron in the Wilderness') is an anime television series produced by GEMBA, which aired from January to March 2019. A smartphone game titled Kōya no Kotobuki Hikōtai – Ōzora no Take Off Girls! was released in February 2019. A compilation film titled The Magnificent Kotobuki Complete Edition premiered in September 2020.

== Plot ==
In a desolate land, people trade goods with each other to survive. Goods are transported via huge zeppelins which hire squadrons of fighter pilots for defense against air pirates and carry their single-engine fighter planes on board. One of these is the Kotobuki Squadron, a team of six young women: Kylie, Emma, Kate, Reona, Zara and Chika.

== Characters ==
=== Kotobuki Squadron ===
Kylie (キリエ, Kirie)
Voiced by: Sayumi Suzushiro
She is a pilot with excellent skills, a natural aptitude for flying and a passion for pancakes. She first flew with Ol' Sab (Shioyama) when she was a young girl. Every member of the squadron has a personal emblem painted on their tail and variation of it on their wingtips, with Kylie's being a bird of prey in her personal colour, red; the squadron's spinners are also painted in their personal colour. She has short black hair and wears a buttoned red coat.
Emma (エンマ, Enma)
Voiced by: Eri Yukimura
Kylie's childhood friend, and a pilot with superior dogfight senses and observational skills. She has the reputation of being called "Emma the Fierce". Her personal emblem is a scythe and rose, with rose thorns along the rear fuselage and wingtips; Emma's personal color is blue, though the rose part is white. Her blonde hair is tied in a bun, although she kept her shoulder length bangs free. She wears a blue dress.
Kate (ケイト, Keito)
Voiced by: Sayaka Nakaya
She is a logical thinker and generally prefers to remain silent. Kate's personal emblem is an arrow pointing opposite directions, in purple. She has long silver hair tied back in two ponytails and wore a white dress shirt with a blue ribbon at the collar.
Reona (レオナ, Reona)
Voiced by: Asami Seto
She is the unit's commanding officer and most experienced member, sensible and a down-to-earth pilot. Among the girls, she once had the reputation of being called "Reona the Tenacious". Her personal mark is a zig-zag shape over three horizontal stripes, and her Hayabusa also has diagonal stripes over the inboard section of the wings, all in green. She has short red hair tied up and wears a white short sleeve shirt under a green top.
Zara (ザラ, Zara)
Voiced by: Hibiku Yamamura
She is the unit's executive officer and generally watches over the squadron members. Zara was a founding member of the squadron, along with Reona. Zara has the most personalized paint scheme, featuring gold swirl patterns over most of her Hayabusa; she is the only member of the squadron to not have her wingtips painted. She has long brown hair and her yellow and white outfit shows her midriff.
Chika (チカ, Chika)
Voiced by: Miyu Tomita
She is the squadron's youngest member and tends to act without thinking. Despite her small stature, she can take out guys twice her size in a brawl. Chika's Hayabusa features pink lightning bolt patterns on the rear fuselage and wingtips, as well as a childish depiction of some sort of animal on the tail (which is not in pink). She has short brown hair tied up in two ponytails and wears a pink coat unbuttoned.

=== Hagoromo Crew ===
Madam Loulou (マダム・ルゥルゥ)
Voiced by: Akiko Yajima
Madam Loulou is president of the Ōni Company which is involved in the transportation of goods and materials. She projects a confident and imposing figure.
Saneatsu (サネアツ)
Voiced by: Keiji Fujiwara
He is the indecisive commanding officer of the Hagoromo airship and intimidated by Madam Loulou.
Anna (アンナ)
Voiced by: Misaki Yoshioka
She is a senior member of the crew of the Hagoromo airship and a headstrong and determined girl who can be critical of Saneatsu.
Maria (マリア)
Voiced by: Miho Okasaki
She is one of the pilots of the airship Hagoromo and is less outspoken than Anna. She always talks about shopping with the latter.
Addie (アディ)
Voiced by: Miyuri Shimabukuro
She is one of three similar-looking girls who the crew on the Hagoromo airship. She has red eyes and wears a matching tie.
Betti (ベティ)
Voiced by: Aoi Koga
She is one of three similar-looking girls who the crew on the Hagoromo airship. She has yellow eyes and wears a matching tie.
Cindi (シンディ)
Voiced by: Natsumi Kawaida
She is one of three similar-looking girls who the crew on the Hagoromo airship. She has green eyes and wears a matching tie.
Natsuo (ナツオ)
Voiced by: Rumi Ōkubo
She is the chief of the maintenance crew for the fighters. Although she looks childlike, she is a full-fledged adult and unafraid to speak her mind, but she also tends to be a potty mouth.
Johnny (ジョニー)
Voiced by: Yōji Ueda
He is the owner and bartender of the bar on board the Hagoromo that the pilots frequent. He serves drinks, cooks food and has a calm and quiet personality. He is also an excellent marksman and ex-mercenary who quit after he met and fell in love with Miki.
Ririko (リリコ)
Voiced by: Nao Tōyama
She is the waitress in Johnny's bar and acts disinterested in her job, but is very capable in a crisis.

=== Other characters ===
Councilor Julia (ジュリア評議員)
A wealthy politician and the councilor in the city of Aleshma in Ikesuka, she owns one of the city's luxurious hotel called "Ocean Sunfish Hotel". Just like Loulou, she too is headstrong and very imposing. However the two hated each other that they don't see eye to eye.
Isao (イサオ)
He is the Head of the View Trading company, who, later on becomes the Mayor of the city of Aleshma in Ikesuka. For some reason Julia both mistrusted and despises him for his cheap magic trick. He is often in the company of his butler and he was once an ace pilot who fought in the battle of Rinouche eight years ago where at one time he saved Reona's life.
Nazarin Squadron
Adolfo Yamada (アドルフォ山田) and Fernando Utsumi (フェルナンド内海)
Voiced by: Matsumoto Shinobu (Adolfo), Satoru Yamamoto (Fernando)
The Nazarin Squadron originally consisted of five pilots: Adolfo, Fernando, Ismael, Miguel and Rodriguez. However after their first encounter with air pirates in the story, only Adolfo and Fernando remain. In the past, Fernando used to be a priest.

== Anime ==
The series is directed by Tsutomu Mizushima and written by Michiko Yokote, both of whom had previously worked on the anime series Shirobako, and features character designs by Hidari. The series aired from January 13 to March 31, 2019, on Tokyo MX, TVA, MBS, and BS11. It is animated by GEMBA, with Digital Frontier handling production and Wao World and Actas handling 2D animation. Shirō Hamaguchi composes the series' music. The series' opening theme song "Sora no Ne" is performed by ZAQ, and the series' ending theme "Tsubasa o Motsu Mono-tachi" is performed by the main cast under the name Kotobuki Squadron. The series is licensed by Sentai Filmworks.

A compilation film titled The Magnificent Kotobuki Complete Edition premiered on September 11, 2020. It includes new footage not seen in the series.

=== Episode list ===
No.	Title (Note: All English titles are taken from Hidive.)	Original release date
1	"Moonlit Guns for Hire" "Tsukiyo no yōjinbō" (月夜の用心棒)	January 13, 2019
The Kotobuki Squadron and their Nakajima Ki-43 Hayabusa fighters are hired by the commanders of a zeppelin transporter to protect it from pirates, to the dismay of the all-male Nazarin Squadron, even though the young women have 200 confirmed stars among them. When the zeppelin is attacked by Mitsubishi A6M2b Zero-equipped pirates, both squadrons are scrambled and the Kotobuki Squadron demonstrates its fighting ability while the Nazarin Squadron loses three of its Kawanishi N1K1-j Shiden fighters. During the tense air pirate attack, Kylie notices a distinctive insignia on an enemy A6M3 Zero, a snake wrapped around a heart, and chases after it. However, the enemy fighter outwits Kylie, and she is only saved when the enemy fighter runs low on fuel and retreats. The zeppelin reaches its destination safely and the Kotobuki Squadron goes on leave.
2	"The Wandering Six" "Sasurai no Roku-nin" (さすらいの6人)	January 20, 2019
After returning to base, Reona berates Kylie for breaking formation, something she regularly does. Meanwhile, Tokiwagi, captain of the third branch of the Rahama Vigilantes argues with Chika, and they get into a fight which is won by the Kotobuki Squadron. Loulou offers the squadrons extra pay to take on a new job, to escort Councilor Julia, her Council Security and her zeppelin to Gador. Reona mentions that Julia has many enemies due to her proposal to integrate ex-pirates into society. On their way, they are attacked by what appears to be five Shirokuma pirates in their Mitsubishi Type 96 carrier-based fighters. However, the pirates are flying in tight formation, and there are in fact four times as many aircraft, flying much more formidable Kawasaki Ki-61 Hiens. The ambush inflicts massive damage on the 8 Nakajima Ki-44 Shoki Council Security fighters that arrived first. Although outnumbered, the later arriving Kotobuki Squadron manage to drive off the pirates and return to the zeppelin which successfully delivers Councilor Julia and later they celebrate their victory. Meanwhile, a building in their hometown of Rahama is set on fire.
3	"Rahama's Longest Day" "Rahama no nagai hi" (ラハマの長い日)	January 27, 2019
The Kotobuki Squadron returns to Rahama to find the town has been attacked by a group of air pirates calling themselves "Elite Industries". Torihei, the CEO of Elite Industries, offers a reproduction ukiyo-e painting in return for the town's prized Mitsubishi J2M Raiden fighter, threatening to return and attack in force if the Raiden is not handed over. Loulou refuses to protect Rahama without payment, but the mayor balks at her price, sparking a fierce debate among the townsfolk over whether to fight or give in to Elite Industries' demands. Loulou agrees to lower her price if the town actively participates in the defense, and after a fiery speech by Emma, the mayor agrees to fight back. When Elite Industries returns, Kotobuki and the Rahama Vigilantes in their Nakajima Ki-27s engage the pirate Nakajima Ki-43-III Hayabusas in a fierce battle and inflict heavy losses, however Elite Industries manages to steal the Raiden using a Yokosuka D4Y2 Suisei in a daring mid-air hijack and escape. Still under contract to protect the Raiden, Loulou orders the Kotobuki Squadron to pursue the pirates and recover the fighter.
4	"Elite Stronghold" "Erīto toride" (エリート砦)	February 3, 2019
The Kotobuki Squadron flies out to raid Elite Industries' hideout and recover the Raiden. However, the base is in a highly fortified mountain stronghold, making it difficult to attack. The squadron encounters a troupe of traveling entertainers headed for Elite Industries, and Zara joins them to infiltrate their base. Once inside, Zara befriends a young girl and talented artist that the CEO, Torihei, is sheltering. Meanwhile, the rest of the Kotobuki Squadron stage a surprise attack on the base, drawing out Elite Industries' pilots, including the CEO, Torihei. However, in the air, the boss is betrayed by his HR Chief Hideaki and the Sales Division, who intend to resign and create their own pirate group. Realizing Torihei in danger, the girl gives Zara the key to the Raiden on the condition that she helps the boss. With the Raiden airborne, Zara and the Kotobuki Squadron are able to force the HR Chief and his men to flee. Torihei and the few remaining Elite Industries pilots thank the Kotobuki Squadron for their help and promise to take on more honest work. The Kotobuki squadron then flies off with the Raiden back towards Rahama.
5	"The Splendid Aleshma" "Kareinaru areshima" (華麗なるアレシマ)	February 10, 2019
The Kotobuki Squadron are in the city of Aleshma in Ikesuka, when they receive a message from First Officer Saneatsu to go to the Ocean Sunfish Hotel to meet Councilor Julia. She engages them to provide air support for her official conference with Isao, the head of View Trading who is likely to be the next head of Ikesuka, and a man she mistrusts and dislikes, especially for his cheap magic tricks. Reona accepts the job against the other members' wishes, and they speculate that Reona may have a crush on Isao. During the conference, Aleshma is attacked by a large number of air pirates flying Zeros and the Kotobuki Squadron, with the two remaining pilots of the Nazarin Squadron in their Shinden fighters, fly out to intercept them. During a fierce dogfight, Kate's fighter is hit defending Reona and she returns to Aleshma. Isao suddenly decides to join the battle while the Kotobuki Squadron focuses on destroying the two approaching Mitsubishi Ki-67 bombers. As they shoot down one bomber, Isao joins the battle piloting an Aichi B7A and Reona tells the others that he was a former ace pilot who saved her during an air battle over Rinouche eight years ago. Eventually, Isao shoots down the remaining bomber which comes to rest at the very building where Councilor Julia awaits the outcome of the battle.
6	"No Place to Return" "Kaerazaru mushuku" (帰らざる無宿)	February 17, 2019
Councilor Julia expresses her anger at Isao's enhanced reputation as she pays Kylie in cash for the squadron's defense of Aleshma. Later, while Kylie is out flying solo, she encounters the enemy fighter with the snake and heart insignia and gives chase. After a protracted dogfight through the clouds, the other plane damages Kylie's engine, but she manages to land on a high plateau which she identifies as Ofukouyama, a former pilot training ground. Kylie recalls her youth in Shioyama when she met the recluse Ol' Sab, who had been abandoned by the Yufang. He took her flying for the first time in his old fighter plane. However, after a visit from a stranger from Yufang, Ol' Sab destroyed has small shack and left in his plane and she never saw him again. Meanwhile, Loulou and the rest of the squadron prepare to search for Kylie who has been missing for 44 hours and still has the money. Back at Ofukouyama, Kylie manages to repair and restart her engine and flies back to Aleshma, encountering the Kotobuki Squadron on the way.
7	"Blood for a Nazarin Pound" "Nasarin no ichi pondo kōka" (ナサリンの1ポンド硬貨)	February 24, 2019
Seventy years after the disappearance of the Yufang, Kate's brother Allen is searching for evidence, but comes under attack and his aeroplane is shot down. Meanwhile, Kylie and Kate test a cheaper fuel from Standon Oil Company for Natsuo, but they find that it is inferior. Kate requests a day off, and visits the crippled Allen in hospital where Kylie and Chika meet him for the first time. Later, Adolfo and Fernando of the Nazarin Squadron, visit the small oil well and refinery at Nanko which supplies high quality gasoline. They find that Standon is buying up all the oil and trying to monopolize supply when suddenly, some storage tanks explode. Adolfo and Fernando seek help from Loulou who agrees to send the Kotobuki Squadron to extinguish the flames with explosives, for a guaranteed future gasoline supply. As the two squadrons approach Nanko, they are met by four Type 4 Hayates. They engage in a fierce dogfight against the faster and better armored Hayates which are flown by experienced pilots. Zara's plane is shot down, but Kylie manages to drop the bomb and extinguish the flames with Kate's help. Back at base they speculate that the attack was part of a plot to control the oil supply. Meanwhile, an unknown man reports to his superiors that the Kotobuki Squadron has interfered with their plot yet again.
8	"The Great Airship Robbery" "Daihikōsen gōtō" (大飛行船強盗)	March 3, 2019
Isao, the new mayor of Ikesuka, purchases a rare fish for public display and hires Loulou's company to transport it, defended only by the Kotobuki Squadron. On the way they encounter a large group of fighters and the squadron fly out to engage them, but the pirates manage to outmaneuver them and board the Hagoromo, taking the crew hostage. The pirates demand that Isao resign and that he disband the Brotherhood of Freedom Union, or they will crash the Hagoromo into Ikesuka. Meanwhile, Saneatsu manages to call the Kotobuki Squadron, notifying them of the situation on board. Emma manages to drop Reona and Kylie onto the Hagoromo and they launch a surprise counter-attack. With the help of Ririko and Johnny, who is actually a retired mercenary, they overpower the pirates, but the controls are damaged and the ship is packed with explosives. Loulou then has Reona and Kylie take of in one of the pirates' Kawasaki Ki-45 Toryu two-seat fighters and use it to disable the Hagoromo and allow it to descend to the ground safely before the Ikesuka air force flying the Kawasaki Ki-100 "Type 5" Fighter can shoot them down. After presenting Isao with the bill for the transport and damage, Loulou says she will never accept another job from him.
9	"The Vagabond Leader" "Akatonbo no fūraibō" (赤とんぼの風来坊)	March 10, 2019
The Kotobuki Squadron members fly out to perform separate jobs while Kylie stays behind at Rahama. Meanwhile, Julia is ousted from her position as councilor of Gadoll when the city votes to join the Brotherhood of Freedom Union, and she is forced to flee the city. Kylie is then given a job to fly Allen on a sightseeing trip, though Loulou also informs her that a company Isao owns wants to buy out the squadron, but she decides to leave the decision to the pilots. As Kylie takes Allen on his flight in an old Type 95 Intermediate Trainer biplane, he explains his theory that the same holes that once let through the Yufang have opened up at other places and times. While Allen is away, Hideaki breaks into his hospital room and steals his research. Allen has Kylie fly to a particular location in the sky where they see three overlapping circles that indicate a hole, however they are attacked by green Shiden-kai fighters. Kylie and Allen are shot down, but manage to escape by playing dead. They are eventually rescued by Chika, and Kylie tells Loulou that she doesn't want the squadron to work for a different company. Meanwhile, Isao begins expanding his influence by bombing cities that refuse to join the Brotherhood of Freedom Union, and makes plans for when the Hole reopens.
10	"The Aggressive Bombers" "Nasake-yō mu no bakugeki-ki" (情け用無の爆撃機)	March 17, 2019
Aboard the Hagoromo, everyone listens to Allen's theories on the mysterious "Holes" when former Councillor Julia arrives complaining that Isao's Brotherhood of Freedom Union is a ploy to grab power. At that moment, they see a Hole opening up over Rahama. Suddenly, Camilla, head of the Shouto Vigilantes, flies in after being shot at by Isao's Ikesuka fighters when they bombed Shouto. Allen surmises Isao is also seeking to control access to the Holes. Meanwhile, Hideaki demands that Rahama join the Union or be bombed, but the mayor and citizens refuse. The next day, the Hagoromo and the Kotobuki Squadron take to the skies to defend Rahama against 5 Nakajima G10N1 heavy bombers escorted by 25 N1K2-J Shiden Kai fighters from Ikesuka. Using an altitude advantage, they attack Isao's incoming bombers with rockets from above, while the Nazarin Squadron and other vigilantes target the incoming fighters. One bomber makes it through the blockade and drops its bombs, however the bombs are sucked into the Hole where they explode and the Hole disappears. Kylie again sees the fighter with the snake and heart insignia, but they both run out of fuel and are forced to land. Kylie discovers the pilot is Naomi and that have a lot in common, including both being trained to fly by Ol' Sab.
11	"Duel in Ikesuka" "Ikesuka no kettō" (イケスカの決闘)	March 24, 2019
At a rally of the Brotherhood of Freedom Union, Isao extols the virtue of the Holes which brought the Yufang, who called themselves Japanese, their liquor, airplanes, anti-air artillery, curry, rice and pancakes. He declares war on Rahama and Porokka whom he says want the Hole for themselves. Meanwhile, Mr. Gaudreau of Porokka gets in touch with Shotou and Julia and they devise a plan to create a diversion with the Ofukouyama squadron to lure out the Ikesuka fighters. At the same time, a fleet of Zeppelins transporting the Kotobuki Squadron and other anti-Ikesuka fighters, fly to target Isao's Fugaku construction plant 25 kilometres south of Ikesuka. However, they discover it's a trap based on false information and are attacked by over 100 fighters, and decide to retreat. Gaudreau's flagship zeppelin is shot down and Isao joins the attack in his experimental Kyushu J7W "Magnificent Lightning". Reona offers Isao a cease fire and he agrees, only to double-cross her and shoot down Zara. Kylie chases Isao, and after he recognizes the bird symbol on her tail he reveals that he shot down ol' Sab. They fight a losing battle even though Torihei, CEO of Elite Industries joins the fight and gives assistance. Meanwhile, Kate shoots down Isao's plane, and as the Kotobuki squadron and the rest of the anti-Ikesuka forces regroup, Allen predicts that another Hole will open up over Ikesuka.
12	"Kotobuki of the Setting Sun" "Yūhi no Kotobuki hikō-tai" (夕陽のコトブキ飛行隊)	March 31, 2019
The remnants of the anti-Ikesuka force stages one last desperate attack on the city of Ikesuka itself, in hopes of closing the Hole and eliminating Isao. However, the Ikesuka forces both heavily outnumber them and have a North American F-86D Sabre at their disposal. The Kotobuki squadron evens the odds by taking the battle directly into the city, where they are able to outmaneuver and shoot down the Ikesuka planes and F-86D. However, Isao then joins the fight in his J7W, now upgraded with its own jet engine. All of the Kotobuki members with the exception of Kylie are shot down or taken out of the fight as the Hole opens above Ikesuka. Meanwhile, the rest of the anti-Ikesuka forces enact their real plan and launch the explosive laden Hagoromo directly at the Hole in an effort to destroy it. Despite having her plane heavily damaged, Kylie remembers Ol' Sab's lesson to her that "You don't fly a plane, they fly on their own". She is able to heavily damage Isao's plane, preventing him from intercepting the Hagoromo. The Hagoromo rams the Hole and explodes, collapsing it. In a frenzied rage, Isao flies directly into the collapsing Hole and disappears. With Isao and the Hole gone, Ikesuka's air force and hired pirates desert and disperse. The war over, the Kotobuki Squadron and their allies return to Rahama, where they talk about their plans for the future.
