= OneChanbara: Bikini Zombie Slayers =

2008 video game

- PAL cover art
- Developer(s): Tamsoft
- Publisher(s): D3 Publisher
- Designer(s): Shunsuke Tezuka
- Series: Onechanbara
- Platform(s): Wii
- Release: JP: February 7, 2008; NA: February 10, 2009; EU: February 27, 2009; AU: March 27, 2009
- Genre(s): Hack and slash
- Mode(s): Single-player

Onechanbara: Bikini Zombie Slayers (お姉チャンバラ Revolution, OneeChanbara: Reboryūshon) is a hack and slash action horror video game developed by Tamsoft and published by D3 for Wii. It was released on February 7, 2008 in Japan, and on February 10, 2009 in North America. The fourth main installment in the Onechanbara series, Bikini Zombie Slayers is the sequel to Onechanbara: Bikini Samurai Squad, and first game in the series to be released on a Nintendo platform.

== Characters ==
- Aya: Raised by her now-deceased father and trained by the sword, Aya has done her best to lead a normal life with her half-sister Saki yet been sometimes feeling a little bit insecure about her family's "Baneful Blood" curse, which has a tendency of sending her into berserk frenzies. Her alt-attack mode has her wielding two swords at once, which furthers the potency of her standard sword-fighting techniques.
- Saki: Aya's younger half-sister and descended from the same cursed bloodline, Saki has fully recovered from wounds sustained during the events of OneChanbara: Bikini Samurai Squad but harbours as much worries about the "Baneful Blood" curse as her older sister does. Her alt-attack mode is focused on single-target hand-to-hand attacks with extreme lethality and precision.
- Reiko: One of the nine "Single Digit" clones of Reiko Mizusaki (No.1–9; all subsequent mass-production clones were based on the Single Digits instead of the original Reiko), she is capable of the full range of investigative tasks from intelligence gathering to self-defense combat and is telepathically linked to all other Single Digits and the original Reiko; in addition, she is genetically modified to duplicate what is essentially Humanity's understanding of the Baneful Blood descendants. Her story arc paints both the original Reiko and her clones in a more positive light, stating that despite extreme methods that have put her clones in conflict with Aya and Saki, Reiko's true aim is not only to wipe out the undeads but also to prevent the possibility that Baneful Blood descendants can turn on the living afterward. Reiko No.9 possesses an alt-attack mode that grants her the use of firearms and comes equipped with a shotgun and a submachine gun. She is unlocked by completing story mode using Aya.
- Misery: Being revived by power left behind by Himiko (the nemesis of Aya and Saki in OneChanbara: Bikini Samurai Squad), this yet another descendant of the "Baneful Blood" is now only interested in exacting vengeance upon Aya and Saki. Her alt-attack mode has her sword transformed into a whip sword, granting it a far longer reach. She is unlocked by completing story mode using Saki.

== Reception ==
Reception

Aggregate score
| Aggregator | Score |
|---|---|
| Metacritic | 55/100 |

Review scores
| Publication | Score |
|---|---|
| Famitsu | 26/40 |
| Game Informer | 6/10 |
| GamesMaster | 50% |
| GameSpot | 3/10 |
| GameTrailers | 4.6/10 |
| GameZone | 6.5/10 |
| IGN | 6.9/10 |
| Nintendo Power | 6.5/10 |
| Official Nintendo Magazine | 71% |
| VideoGamer.com | 4/10 |
| 411Mania | 5.8/10 |

The game received "mixed" reviews according to the review aggregation website Metacritic. In Japan, Famitsu gave it a score of two sevens and two sixes, bringing it to a total of 26 out of 40.
