= Global Defence Force =

2005 video game

Global Defence Force / Simple 2000 Series Vol. 81: The Chikyū Bōeigun 2
- European PlayStation 2 box art
- Developer: Sandlot
- Publishers: D3 Publisher: EU: Essential Games (PS2); NA: Xseed Games; EU: PQube (Vita)
- Directors: Takehiro Honma; Toshio Noguchi
- Producer: Nobuyuki Okajima
- Programmers: Toshio Noguchi; Nobuo Fujii
- Artist: Masatsugu Igarashi
- Composers: Masafumi Takada; Jun Fukuda
- Series: Earth Defense Force
- Platforms: PlayStation 2, PlayStation Portable, PlayStation Vita, Nintendo Switch
- Release: July 28, 2005: PlayStation 2; JP: July 28, 2005; EU: June 29, 2007 PlayStation Portable; JP: April 7, 2011 PlayStation Vita; JP: December 11, 2014; NA: December 8, 2015; EU: February 12, 2016; AU: August 1, 2016 Nintendo Switch; JP: July 15, 2021
- Genre: Third-person shooter
- Modes: Single-player, multiplayer

Global Defence Force (Note: Known in Japan as Earth Defense Force 2 (Japanese: THE地球防衛軍2, Hepburn: Za Chikyū Bōeigun Tsū; lit. The Earth Defense Forces 2)) is a 2005 third-person shooter video game developed by Sandlot for the PlayStation 2. It was originally published as The Chikyū Bōeigun 2 in Japan by D3 Publisher, as volume 81 of the Simple 2000 series of budget games. It was later released in Europe by Essential Games, the brand created by D3 Publisher to publish Simple 2000 series games in Europe.

Players assume the role of a member of the Earth Defense Force and fight giant insects and other enemies who have invaded Earth from outer space.

A PlayStation Portable version of the game, titled Earth Defense Forces 2 Portable, was released on April 7, 2011 in Japan. A PlayStation Vita version, titled Earth Defense Force 2: Invaders from Planet Space (known in Japan as Earth Defense Forces 2 Portable V2), was released for the first time in North America by Xseed Games in December 2015. A port of Earth Defense Force 2 was released for the Nintendo Switch in Japan in July 2021.

== Gameplay ==
The PaleWing soldier flying with her jetpack while attacking giant ants with an electrical weapon

Global Defence Force is a third-person shooter featuring large play areas and waves of mecha and giant insects. Players control either a foot soldier (Storm-1) who uses conventional weaponry such as assault and sniper rifles, shotguns, and rocket-propelled grenades or a jetpack-equipped soldier (Pale Wing) who uses energy-based weaponry. Most of the game's missions are cleared by eliminating all enemies present, starting with giant ants on earlier stages and eventually progressing to giant lizard enemies. A number of vehicles such as a tank, helicopter, and a hoverbike are available in some missions for players to board and attack enemies with. However, only the Storm-1 unit can use the vehicles.

Split screen co-operative mode. The player on the left is controlling the PaleWing soldier. The player on the right, controlling the infantryman, is driving a tank.

A total of 300 different weapons are available between the two characters, but players are limited to carrying two weapons during missions. Weapons are unlocked by picking up containers dropped by enemies. Every weapon picked up during play will add a random weapon of the character's to the selection, duplicate weapons are discarded. Armor chips and medical kits, also dropped by enemies, increase the character's maximum possible health and recover lost health respectively.

There are a total of 71 missions spread over 7 environments to play through, the first mission taking place in London. Five difficulty levels are available for each mission. Half-medals are awarded for completing a mission on a set difficulty with either character. Completing the same stage with the other character results in a complete medal. Once a player has collected all the medals for every mission, "Impossible" mode is unlocked. Impossible difficulty limits the Armor (HP) value for both Pale Wing and Infantry.

== Reception ==
Reception

Aggregate score
Aggregator	Score		
Aggregator	PS Vita	PS2	PSP
Metacritic	72/100	N/A	N/A

Review scores
Publication	Score		
Publication	PS Vita	PS2	PSP
Destructoid	8/10	N/A	N/A
Edge	N/A	8/10	N/A
Famitsu	30/40	29/40	27/40
GameRevolution	3.5/5	N/A	N/A
X-Play	N/A	3/5	N/A

Global Defence Force received little press attention in the West. The few reviews the game received were generally positive; Games Asylum's Matt Gander described it as "one of the PlayStation 2’s best budget buys". In Japan, Famitsu gave it a score of one eight and three sevens for the PS2 version; and one eight, one seven, and two sixes for the PSP version.

The PlayStation Vita re-release of the game, published by Xseed Games and retitled Earth Defense Force 2: Invaders From Planet Space, received "average" reviews according to the review aggregation website Metacritic. Destructoid's Jed Whitaker wrote that the game "has enough original content to keep it feeling fresh alongside the other recent releases in the series", and that it was "easy to recommend to Vita owners looking for some campy over-the-top action in spite of its flaws." In Japan, Famitsu gave the Vita version a score of three sevens and one nine for a total of 30 out of 40. During the 19th Annual D.I.C.E. Awards, the Academy of Interactive Arts & Sciences nominated Earth Defense Force 2 for "Handheld Game of the Year".

During D3 Publisher's simple series awards 2007, the title received a platinum prize for selling more than 200,000 copies in Japan during the 2006 fiscal year. It was the only title in the range to reach this volume of sales.

== See also ==
- Simple (video game series)
