= Earth Defense Force: Insect Armageddon =

2011 video game

- North American cover art
- Developer: Vicious Cycle Software
- Publishers: NA/JP: D3 Publisher; PAL: Namco Bandai Games
- Series: Earth Defense Force
- Engine: Vicious Engine 2
- Platforms: PlayStation 3, Xbox 360, Windows
- Release: PlayStation 3, Xbox 360: NA: July 5, 2011; JP: July 7, 2011; AU: July 21, 2011; EU: July 22, 2011; Windows: WW: December 14, 2011
- Genre: Third-person shooter
- Modes: Single-player, multiplayer

Earth Defense Force: Insect Armageddon (Note: Japanese: アースディフェンスフォース インセクトアルマゲドン, Hepburn: Āsu Difensu Fōsu Insekuto Arumagedon) is a 2011 third-person shooter developed by Vicious Cycle Software, and published by D3 Publisher, for the PlayStation 3, Xbox 360 and Windows. It is a spin-off entry in the Japanese Earth Defense Force series, and is essentially an American take on the premise, following the titular Earth Defense Force as they deploy to fight an invasion of aliens and giant insects in the United States. Insect Armageddon has no story or setting connection to the numbered Earth Defense Force series.

Insect Armageddon was released to mixed but generally positive reviews from critics.

== Gameplay ==
Players take the role of Lightning Alpha, who battles against wave after wave of deadly gigantic insect and robot enemies. Insect Armageddon predominately takes place in the city of New Detroit, the target of a concentrated bug invasion that only the EDF can stop. The graphics have been greatly improved, but still retain the arcade-shooter physics of its predecessor. Vehicle controls have been fixed, with improved tank and mecha vehicles that can be manned by more than one player. Credits are accumulated which are used for a wide variety of tasks.

Over 300 weapons are available. These can be purchased using a new unlock system that partially replaces the in-game weapon drop system of Earth Defense Force 2017, though some weapons are only dropped by elite enemies. Four different classes are selectable from the menu, each with special functions and exclusive equipment. All armor colors can be customized.

Trooper Armor: The standard armor with an expansive loadout. It has access to more weapons than any other class, and upgradable abilities that allow it to be a versatile, all-around unit. The Trooper Armor is also the only armor available in Survival Mode.

Jet Armor: Jet-powered armor used for flying and aerial attacks. It uses energy to replenish weapons. The jet pack allows the fastest movement across the map for any class but also the weakest protection.

Tactical Armor: Wide-ranging support armor. It is the only class that can deploy turrets, mines and radar dishes. Stronger equipment is unlocked as the story progresses.

Battle Armor: Heavy armor similar to an exoskeleton. It is powerful but slow, comes with a portable energy shield, and can equip some of the most powerful weapons in the game. Battle armor also can release its entire pool of energy in a massive electric blast, damaging everything unfortunate enough to be close by.

Both split-screen and online co-operative play are included. A six-player Survival mode is also available, with a squad of EDF soldiers defending against endless waves of bugs.

== Plot ==
The EDF defends a fictional city called New Detroit against an alien invasion, aided by bio-engineered terrestrial insects. The Player goes by the name of 'Lightning Alpha', leader of an elite team of fighters, known as "Strike Force Lightning." Along with two squad mates, Lightning is (usually) aided by local EDF fighting forces in the area, though they are poor compared to Lightning.

The story is divided into three separate chapters, which are divided into five separate missions. The first chapter is akin to an introduction to the game, while the second chapter has Strike Force Lightning moving across industrial New Detroit to discover the fates of several downed Landers scattered across the city, as well as their pilots and cargo. Only one of them is salvageable, and it becomes piloted by the cool-headed Captain Sully, a character that returns in later missions. The third chapter follows the story of Lightning finding and transporting "The Cube" to a nest in central New Detroit. Before it is deployed, an Ant Queen emerges from the nest, forcing Lightning to do battle with it to secure the drop zone.

Once the Queen and her minions are dead, "The Cube" is dropped in the middle of the nest, and Lightning quickly makes their way to the evacuation zone. As their transport Lander is about to begin its descent, a new Ravager ship (akin to a much larger and more heavily armed version of a Ravager Carrier) appears in the skies, downing the Lander. Lightning rendezvous with Echo and X-Ray squads, EDF troopers who were stuck in Central Detroit without evacuation, and they make their way to another evacuation site where they must defend against several Hectors (large Ravager Mech Walkers) until they are rescued by Lander Captain Sully, who (at the time) violated an EDF No-Fly Zone without remorse.

== Reception ==
Reception

Aggregate score
Aggregator	Score		
Aggregator	PC	PS3	Xbox 360
Metacritic	69/100	63/100	68/100

Review scores
Publication	Score		
Publication	PC	PS3	Xbox 360
Destructoid	N/A	N/A	8/10
Eurogamer	N/A	N/A	8/10
Game Informer	N/A	8/10	8/10
GameRevolution	N/A	N/A	B
GameSpot	N/A	7/10	7/10
GameSpy	2.5/5	N/A	N/A
GameTrailers	N/A	N/A	5.5/10
Giant Bomb	N/A	2/5	2/5
IGN	7.5/10	7.5/10	7.5/10
Joystiq	N/A	N/A	2/5
Official Xbox Magazine (US)	N/A	N/A	6.5/10
PC Gamer (UK)	60%	N/A	N/A
PlayStation: The Official Magazine	N/A	7/10	N/A
The Telegraph	N/A	8/10	N/A
Digital Spy	N/A	N/A	3/5
Metro	N/A	4/10	N/A

Earth Defense Force: Insect Armageddon received "mixed or average reviews" on all platforms according to the review aggregation website Metacritic. In Japan, Famitsu gave the PlayStation 3 and Xbox 360 versions a score of all four sevens for a total of 28 out of 40.

Digital Spy gave the same console version three stars out of five and said it was "unquestionably a fun game, but it's the same fun we had with its PS2 and Xbox 360 predecessors. The latest game offers very little that it can call its own, has a severe lack of memorable moments and is often incredibly dull and repetitive." Edge similarly gave the same console version six out of ten, saying, "Old hands will still find much of the personality and singular vision of the franchise intact, but it's the newcomers, who might find Insect Armageddon a jarring mix of old-fashioned thrills and modern gameplay trends." The Digital Fix gave the same console version five out of ten, saying, "In the end the ‘budget’ in ‘budget title’ shone through and whilst Insect Armageddon is a laugh in co-op (in short bursts) it becomes far too much of a grind, very quickly."

The Daily Telegraph gave the PS3 version a score of eight out of ten and said, "There's nothing quite like EDF's insane thrills. Simple, old-school, but oh so very good at what it does, Insect Armageddon is well worth a look. As long as you don't mind a bit of ant vomit, of course." GameZone gave the PC version a score of seven out of ten, saying, "EDF: IA is simple, sure, but that simply means that anyone can hop into the arcade-style action of Insect Armageddon and be wreaking havok almost immediately. Not to mention that the game has definitely dropped in price since its initial console release, now available for just $19.99 on Steam and other download services. So if you've been looking for a solid multiplayer co-op romp which lets you dial back your brain a bit and simply blow up everything in sight, I definitely recommend picking up this title." However, 411Mania gave the Xbox 360 version a score of 6.2 out of 10 and said that "it's not that Insect Armageddon is a bad game; it's just that it gets repetitive. If you're just looking for mindless killing for a bit, this may be a worthwhile pickup for you and your friends. However, if you're looking for any kind of depth, look elsewhere." GamePro gave the Xbox 360 version three stars out of five, saying, "Ultimately it all comes down to this: There's an achievement for killing 100 ants, and you'll get that before completing the first level. Does that get your blood pumping 'EDF! EDF!'?"
