= Sandlot (company) =

Japanese video game developer

Sandlot Co., Ltd.
- Native name: 株式会社サンドロット
- Romanized name: Kabushiki Gaisha Sandorotto
- Company type: Private
- Industry: Video games
- Founded: March 12, 2001
- Headquarters: Suginami, Tokyo, Japan
- Key people: Shiro Kuroda (CEO)
- Products: Earth Defense Force; Robot Alchemic Drive; Zangeki no Reginleiv
- Number of employees: 25
- Website: sandlot.jp

Sandlot (Japanese: 株式会社サンドロット, Hepburn: Kabushiki Gaisha Sandorotto) is a Japanese video game developer that is known for its unusual and inventive control and gameplay mechanics. The company was founded in March 2001 and is composed of former employees from Human Entertainment.

== Games developed ==
=== PlayStation 2 ===
2001

- Tekkōki Mikazuki Trial Edition, published by Media Factory only in Japan

2002

- Gigantic Drive, published by Enix, known in North America as Robot Alchemic Drive

2003

- Simple 2000 series Vol. 31: The Chikyū Bōeigun (Earth Defense Force), published by D3 Publisher, known in Europe as Monster Attack

2004

- Tetsujin 28-go, published by Bandai only in Japan

2005

- Simple 2000 series Vol. 81: The Chikyū Bōeigun 2 (Earth Defense Force 2), published by D3 Publisher, known in Europe as Global Defence Force

=== Nintendo DS ===
2006

- Chōsōjū Mecha MG (Note: Japanese: 超操縦メカ MG; roughly translated as "Super Control Robot MG") is a mecha video game published by Nintendo only in Japan. Popular Japanese singer and voice actor Ichirou Mizuki sung its song heard in the game's Japanese television commercials and trailer.

The player uses the stylus to manipulate a Marionation Gear (MG) on the battlefield. MGs are giant mechas that have been developed from marionettes. The touch screen shows a control panel which varies depending on which MG the player is operating. Actions are performed using the touch screen. They include shooting, jumping, swinging a mecha's arm or close-range weapon, changing form, shooting projectiles, etc. There are more than 100 mechas, some of which are able to transform from a vehicle form to a robot form and vice versa, similar to piloted robots from many Japanese television shows.

The gameplay of Chōsōjū Mecha MG is split into a series of over 120 missions, which can range from defeating enemy robots to winning first place in a race. Outside of battle, MGs can be purchased from various shops, and equipped with status boosting items.

In the 2008 crossover fighting game, Super Smash Bros. Brawl, 3 Marionation Gears, which are the Warrior Mech Gauss, HM Mech Rosa, and Musketeer Daltania, appear as trophies and stickers. The Beetle-like MG, Ningyou Kouchuu Viigaru, appears only as a sticker in Brawl. A remix titled "Marionation Gear" plays on a stage called Norfair, which is an area from the Metroid series, in Brawl. "Marionation Gear" returns in Super Smash Bros. for Wii U on the same stage. Gauss also appears as a spirit in Super Smash Bros. Ultimate, with the song "Marionation Gear" returning as well, but this time it can only be played in stages not associated to any fighter.

=== Xbox 360 ===
2006

- Chikyū Bōeigun 3 (Earth Defense Force 3), published by D3 Publisher, known in North America and Europe as Earth Defense Force 2017

2013

- Chikyū Bōeigun 4 (Earth Defense Force 4), published by D3 Publisher, known in North America and Europe as Earth Defense Force 2025

=== Wii ===
2010

- Zangeki no Reginleiv, published by Nintendo only in Japan

=== PlayStation Portable ===
2011

- Chikyū Bōeigun 2 Portable (Earth Defense Force 2 Portable), published by D3 Publisher only in Japan

=== PlayStation Vita ===
2012

- Chikyū Bōeigun 3 Portable (Earth Defense Force 3 Portable), published by D3 Publisher, known in North America and Europe as Earth Defense Force 2017 Portable

2014

- Chikyū Bōeigun 2 Portable V2 (Earth Defense Force 2 Portable V2), published by D3 Publisher, known in North America and Europe as Earth Defense Force 2: Invaders from Planet Space

=== PlayStation 3 ===
2013

- Chikyū Bōeigun 4 (Earth Defense Force 4), published by D3 Publisher, known in North America and Europe as Earth Defense Force 2025

=== PlayStation 4 ===
2015

- Chikyū Bōeigun 4.1: The Shadow of New Despair (Earth Defense Force 4.1: The Shadow of New Despair), published by D3 Publisher

2017

- Chikyū Bōeigun 5 (Earth Defense Force 5), published by D3 Publisher

2022

- Chikyū Bōeigun 6 (Earth Defense Force 6), published by D3 Publisher

=== Windows ===
2016

- Chikyū Bōeigun 4.1: The Shadow of New Despair (Earth Defense Force 4.1: The Shadow of New Despair), published by D3 Publisher

2019

- Chikyū Bōeigun 5 (Earth Defense Force 5), published by D3 Publisher

2022

- Chikyū Bōeigun 6 (Earth Defense Force 6), published by D3 Publisher

=== Nintendo Switch ===
2021

- Chikyū Bōeigun 2 (Earth Defense Force 2), published by D3 Publisher only in Japan
- Chikyū Bōeigun 3 (Earth Defense Force 3), published by D3 Publisher only in Japan

=== PlayStation 5 ===
2022

- Chikyū Bōeigun 6 (Earth Defense Force 6), published by D3 Publisher
