= Earth Defense Force 2017 =

2006 video game

- North American Xbox 360 box art
- Developer: Sandlot
- Publisher: D3 Publisher
- Directors: Toshio Noguchi; Takehiro Honma
- Producers: Shiro Kuroda; Nobuyuki Okajima
- Designer: Takehiro Honma
- Composers: Masafumi Takada; Jun Fukuda; Shinya Tanaka
- Series: Earth Defense Force
- Platforms: Xbox 360, PlayStation Vita, Nintendo Switch
- Release: December 14, 2006: Xbox 360; JP: December 14, 2006; NA: March 20, 2007; EU: March 30, 2007 PlayStation Vita; JP: September 27, 2012; NA: January 8, 2013; PAL: January 16, 2013 Nintendo Switch; JP: October 14, 2021
- Genre: Third-person shooter
- Modes: Single-player, multiplayer

Earth Defense Force 2017 (Note: Known in Japan as Chikyū Bōeigun 3 (Japanese: 地球防衛軍3; lit. Earth Defense Forces 3)) is a third-person shooter developed by Sandlot, and published by D3 Publisher, for the Xbox 360. It is the follow-up to Global Defence Force, and is the first game in the Earth Defense Force series (as well as the first game based on D3's Simple series of budget games) to be released in North America. Earth Defense Force 3 was the best selling Games on Demand game in Japan for 2009. The game was released on the PlayStation Vita in Japan on 27 September 2012. It was released digital-only in North America on January 8, 2013 and in the PAL region on January 16, 2013. A port of the game was released for the Nintendo Switch in Japan on October 14, 2021.

== Gameplay ==
The player takes control of an Earth Defense Force (EDF) soldier who is part of the elite unit Storm 1. To fight the enemy forces, consisting of aliens and massive insects, the player can access over 150 weapons, ranging from assault rifles and sniper rifles to rocket launchers, grenades, and laser weapons. Only two weapons may be selected for each mission. Some levels also contain vehicles which can be commandeered; a tank, a helicopter, a hoverbike, and a bipedal mecha are available.

The game takes place across 53 levels featuring destructible environments, taking place in settings such as cities and caves. There is no penalty for collateral damage that is inflicted on the environment by the player, for instance buildings will crumble after sustaining a single hit from a rocket launcher or grenade. Other EDF soldiers can be recruited or followed, and will attack enemies on sight.

There are five difficulty levels. More effective weapons are dropped by enemies at the higher difficulty levels, encouraging players to repeat the missions. In addition to weapons, armor enhancements which function as permanent maximum health bonuses are dropped along with healing items.

== Plot ==
In 2013, radio waves from deep space are received by scientists, revealing the existence of extraterrestrial life. Two years later, the Earth Defense Force, a unified multinational military organization, is established in case the aliens are hostile. In 2017, first contact is made when hundreds of unidentified flying objects suddenly arrive and hover over major cities across the globe, led by a massive mothership positioned over Tokyo. As the EDF is mobilized, giant acid-spitting insects resembling ants begin assaulting many civilians. The main character is an unnamed Captain in Storm 1, a Japanese unit regarded as the EDF's best. An air assault by the EDF is attempted on the mothership, but the plan is thwarted by alien UFO gunships. This operation is deemed a failure, resulting in the surviving EDF forces abandoning the cities to begin a guerrilla campaign in rural areas.

While patrolling the Japanese countryside, Storm 1 is informed by command that an extensive alien nest is being built underground. From this nest, the aliens will be able to spawn an infinite number of bugs and bypass EDF defenses. Intelligence provided by Scout Teams shows that a single alien Queen is at the center of the nest, and its destruction will stop the production of the rapidly multiplying bugs. Storm 1 assaults the nest with the help of all available Ranger Teams, and successfully kills the Queen. A few days later, Storm 1 assists a Scout Team with monitoring the mothership, which has landed on the Japanese coast and appears dormant, damaged, and defenseless. Oddly, it is observed sucking in huge amounts of air and releasing carbon dioxide, implying that the ship is more than a synthetic machine, and may be the hive intelligence controlling the aliens. Command orders the Teams to assault the mothership with heavy weapons, but the ship re-activates and wipes out the Scout Team.

Before the alien mothership retreats, it drops a massive four-legged mecha on the coast, which uses a powerful plasma cannon to assault EDF positions. Storm 1 destroys the mecha before it can cause too much harm, and later neutralizes several kaiju-like cyborg creatures. While the Japanese contingent of the EDF continues to hold out, the rest of the world is soon overrun and enslaved. Japan stands as the last unoccupied territory. All remaining insects and mechs on the ground make a beeline to the bombed-out ruins of Tokyo, where the mothership has stopped to repair and arm an enormous cannon, capable of destroying anything in its path. The remaining EDF forces move to block the alien advance so Storm 1 can destroy the mothership. Storm 1 focuses fire on the mothership and destroys it. The remaining alien forces become disorganized and flee.

== PlayStation Vita port ==
A PlayStation Vita version of the game was announced on June 5, 2012 as Earth Defense Forces 3 Portable. The new version includes both local and online co-operative play, as well as the return of Palewing from Earth Defense Force 2. The game was released on September 27, 2012 in Japan. It was released digital-only in North America on January 8, 2013 and in Europe and Australia on January 16, 2013 as Earth Defense Force 2017 Portable.

== Reception ==
Reception

Aggregate score
Aggregator	Score	
Aggregator	PS Vita	Xbox 360
Metacritic	68/100	69/100

Review scores
Publication	Score	
Publication	PS Vita	Xbox 360
Electronic Gaming Monthly	N/A	7.5/10 (Note: Three critics of Electronic Gaming Monthly gave the Xbox 360 version each a score of 8/10, 7/10, and 7.5/10.)
Eurogamer	8/10	9/10
Game Informer	N/A	8/10
GameRevolution	4/10	B−
GameSpot	7/10	7.1/10
GameSpy	N/A	4/5
GameTrailers	N/A	7.3/10
Hardcore Gamer	N/A	2.25/5
IGN	7.5/10	6.9/10
PlayStation Official Magazine – UK	7/10	N/A
Official Xbox Magazine (US)	N/A	6/10
Pocket Gamer	3/5	N/A
Polygon	7/10	N/A
VentureBeat	72/100	N/A
The Digital Fix	7/10	N/A
Metro	6/10	N/A

The game received "average" reviews on both platforms according to the review aggregation website Metacritic. In Japan, Famitsu gave it a score of two sevens and two eights for the Xbox 360 version, and three eights and one seven for the Vita version; while Famitsu X360 gave the former console version a score of one seven, two eights, and one nine.

Reviewers pointed out that the Xbox 360 version suffered from relatively poor graphics, a lack of many standard features and characteristically poor voice acting. However, said console version still received solid reviews from western critics, whose general consensus was that it is "inexplicably fun". Some advocate it as a "gamers' game" with nothing in the way of the pure game, like Kieron Gillen in his Eurogamer review; the console version's strong emphasis on arcade-style gameplay, with massively destructive weapons and hordes of enemies, suggests that this may have been the driving philosophy behind its design. Some outlets, however, claimed that said console version paled in comparison to its predecessor, which had a larger range of enemies, missions, weapons and a second playable character. Edge, for example, gave it six out of ten and said, "The illusion of epic-scale warfare remains a powerful and entertaining one, broken most significantly by the player's need to avoid overexposing themselves to its fundamentally tedious nature." GameZone gave it 6.9 out of 10, saying, "Players will be able to tell that this game had a low budget, because almost every area of the game needs improvement. Even though this is the case, this is an extremely fun game to play with your friends just because you want to kill everything in sight and protect humanity from extenuation." GamePro, however, said of the game, "As fun as hurling dozens of rockets at a time into a swarm of giant alien ants is, it will get boring after a few hours. If you're up for a shallow yet addictive and gratuitously violent shooter, you can't go wrong with Earth Defense Force. Just take a break every few hours and read a book to rebuild some of the higher brain function you just lost." (Note: GamePro gave the Xbox 360 version 3.5/5 for graphics, 3/5 for sound, 4/5 for control and 3.75/5 for fun factor.) GameDaily gave it eight out of ten, saying, "Even with the frame rate hiccups and the lack of online support, Earth Defense Force 2017 succeeds tremendously, thanks to its devastation and non-stop action. This piece of sci-fi cheesy goodness fits right in with Microsoft's meatier games -- very appetizing."
