= Earth Defense Force =

Video game series

- Japanese series logo as of 2012
- Genres: Third-person shooter, strategy
- Developers: Sandlot (2003–present); thinkArts (2006); Vicious Cycle Software (2011); Esquadra (2016); Clouds Inc. (2017); Yuke's (2019, 2020, 2024)
- Publisher: D3 Publisher
- Composers: Masafumi Takada; Jun Fukuda
- Platforms: PlayStation 2, Xbox 360, PlayStation Portable, PlayStation 3, Windows, PlayStation Vita, PlayStation 4, Nintendo Switch, PlayStation 5, Nintendo Switch 2
- First release: Monster Attack; June 26, 2003
- Latest release: Earth Defense Force: World Brothers 2 September 26, 2024

Earth Defense Force, known in Japan as Chikyū Bōeigun (Japanese: 地球防衛軍; lit. Earth Defense Forces), is a third-person shooter video game series created by Sandlot, originating as an offshoot of D3 Publisher's Simple series. As of 2024, it consists of eleven entries with six main installments, developed and published by various companies since 2003. The series follows the titular Earth Defense Force (EDF), an international armed force that fights to defend Earth from alien invasions by extraterrestrials that field massive insectoids in their war against humanity.

Individual Earth Defense Force releases generally receive mixed or average reviews, but the series has been lauded for its simplistic yet entertaining premise and campy tone, and it maintains a strong cult following.

== Premise ==
Earth Defense Force has roughly five separate continuities as of 2024. However, in general, all entries in the series share a similar basic premise, following the Earth Defense Force (EDF), a specialized multinational defense force established and supported by every country and staffed by the world's militaries, tasked with defending Earth and humanity from external threats. The vast majority of Earth Defense Force installments are set after the discovery of the Ravagers, an intelligent and organized alien race, with the formation of the EDF sometimes explained as being a precautionary measure. The Ravagers prove to be hostile and attempt to invade Earth, deploying massive insectoids such as ants, ticks, pillbugs, beetles, hornets, and spiders to destroy Earth and exterminate humanity; this prompts the full-scale deployment of the EDF to fight back and repel the alien invasion.

The series installments are mostly set during the 2017 invasion, during later invasions in 2019 and 2025, or, in different continuities such as the one introduced in Earth Defense Force 5, 2022 and 2026. Several conflicts also feature alien races and enemy types distinct from the Ravagers and the insects, including the bipedal frog-like Colonists (their "resemblance" to humans based on generic characteristics such as having two eyes is a running gag), the advanced grey alien-inspired Cosmonauts, the reality-bending but genocidal Primers, assorted robots and probes fielded by the aliens, and various kaiju.

The EDF largely consists of infantry units and armored fighting vehicles, and the series entries typically depict the player as a member of either regular infantry or elite special forces. The game's playable characters are represented by different character classes ("armors") that vary depending on the game, but across most entries the basic armors are the "Infantry"/"Trooper"/"Ranger", a standard all-rounded soldier wielding standard service weaponry and explosives; the "Pale Wing"/"Wing Diver"/"Jet Lifter", a female special forces scout with a light but vulnerable jet-powered winged suit; the "Fencer", a support soldier in a heavy but slow exoskeleton wielding heavy guns, powerful swords, and usually also a ballistic shield; and the "Air Raider", a logistical technician reliant on controlling close air support, drones, and requisitioning usable combat vehicles such as tanks, infantry fighting vehicles, helicopters, hoverbikes, and mecha.

== Games ==
Release timeline Main entries in bold
2003	**Monster Attack**
2004
2005	**Global Defence Force**
2006	Global Defence Force Tactics
2006	**Earth Defense Force 2017**
2007
2008
2009
2010
2011	Earth Defense Force: Insect Armageddon
2012
2013	**Earth Defense Force 2025**
2014
2015	**Earth Defense Force 4.1: The Shadow of New Despair**
2016	TapWars: Earth Defense Force 4.1
2017	Earth Defense Force 4.1: Wing Diver The Shooter
2017	**Earth Defense Force 5**
2018
2019	Earth Defense Force: Iron Rain
2020	Earth Defense Force: World Brothers
2021
2022	**Earth Defense Force 6**
2023
2024	Earth Defense Force: World Brothers 2

=== Main series ===
==== Monster Attack (2003) ====
Simple 2000 Series Vol. 31: The Chikyū Bōeigun, released in Europe by Agetec as Monster Attack, is the first main installment and the first game in the series overall, developed by Sandlot as part of D3 Publisher's Simple series for the PlayStation 2. Set in 2017, it follows an informally-organized EDF that deploys after the world's militaries are devastated by the alien invasion, to fight a pitched battle with the invaders in Tokyo.

==== Global Defence Force (2005) ====
Chikyū Bōeigun 2, released in Europe as Global Defence Force, is the second main installment, developed by Sandlot for the PlayStation 2. Later rereleases for the PlayStation Portable in 2011 and the PlayStation Vita in 2014 and 2015 retitled it as Earth Defense Forces 2. Set after Monster Attack in 2019, it follows the now-official EDF as they fight against another attack by massive insects, which culminates in a second alien invasion.

==== Earth Defense Force 2017 (2006) ====
Chikyū Bōeigun 3, released overseas as Earth Defense Force 2017 and alternatively known as Earth Defense Force 3, is the third main installment, developed by Sandlot for the Xbox 360 and PlayStation Vita. A rerelease of the game for the Nintendo Switch was released in Japan in 2021. It was the first game in the series to be released in North America and for a non-PlayStation console, and includes local and online co-operative play. It essentially retells the events of the 2017 invasion depicted in Monster Attack, from the perspective of Storm-1, an elite Japanese EDF unit that spearheads the fight against the aliens.

==== Earth Defense Force 2025 (2013) ====
Chikyū Bōeigun 4, released overseas as Earth Defense Force 2025, is the fourth main installment, developed by Sandlot for the Xbox 360 and PlayStation 3. It features four player online co-operative play. An updated port featuring cross-region multiplayer, Earth Defense Force 4.1: The Shadow of New Despair, was released for the PlayStation 4 and Microsoft Windows in 2015, and a Nintendo Switch port was released in 2022. It is a direct sequel to Earth Defense Force 2017 and follows the EDF's elite Storm Team during another war against a larger alien invasion in 2025.

==== Earth Defense Force 5 (2017) ====
Chikyū Bōeigun 5, released overseas as Earth Defense Force 5, is the fifth main installment, developed by Sandlot for the PlayStation 4 and Microsoft Windows. It was announced at TGS 2016, released in Japan in 2017, and released in North America and Europe in 2018. It is a reboot of the series and follows the EDF, a private military company in this continuity, as they fight to repel a massive alien invasion in 2022.

==== Earth Defense Force 6 (2022) ====
Chikyū Bōeigun 6, released overseas as Earth Defense Force 6, is the sixth main installment developed by Sandlot for the PlayStation 4, PlayStation 5, Windows, and Nintendo Switch 2. It was released in Japan in 2022, and was released in North America and Europe in spring 2024. It is scheduled to release for Nintendo Switch 2 on January 28, 2027. It currently has the most missions of any entry in the series, with almost 150 missions not counting expansion content. Set three years after Earth Defense Force 5, when the Primers return to a battered Earth and render the planet nearly uninhabitable and humanity almost extinct, the game follows the EDF's remnants as they use a Primer time portal to time travel back to the events of Earth Defense Force 5 to prevent humanity's defeat, but interference from the Primers causes a time loop as both vie to change the course of history.

An updated version with increased enemies, Chikyū Bōeigun 6.2: Invaders from Another World, is scheduled for release on the PlayStation 5 in 2027.

=== Spin-offs ===
==== Global Defence Force Tactics (2006) ====
Chikyū Bōeigun: Tactics, released in Europe as Global Defence Force Tactics, is a turn-based strategy game developed by thinkArts for the PlayStation 2. The story is essentially a retelling of the events of Global Defence Force from a command perspective instead of the on-the-ground perspective of the main installments.

==== Earth Defense Force: Insect Armageddon (2011) ====
Earth Defense Force: Insect Armageddon is a spin-off developed by Vicious Cycle Software for the Xbox 360, PlayStation 3, and Microsoft Windows. It was the first game in the series to be developed outside Japan and also the first to feature online co-op. It is essentially an "Americanized" rendition of the Earth Defense Force series, and follows American EDF forces as they defend the United States from aliens and insects, presented as a non-canon "side story" to Earth Defense Force 2017.

==== TapWars: Earth Defense Force 4.1 (2016) ====
TapWars: Earth Defense Force 4.1 is a mobile game developed by Esquadra and released for iOS and Android in December 2016.

==== Earth Defense Force 4.1: Wing Diver The Shooter (2017) ====
Earth Defense Force 4.1: Wing Diver The Shooter is a direct spin-off of Earth Defense Force 4.1: The Shadow of New Despair. Developed by Clouds Inc. and Giga-Rensya Inc., it is a vertical scrolling 3D shooting game. It was initially released as a downloadable title on the Japanese PlayStation Store for PlayStation 4 on November 22, 2017, and saw a worldwide release via Steam on April 25, 2018.

==== Earth Defense Force: Iron Rain (2019) ====
Earth Defense Force: Iron Rain is a spin-off developed by Yuke's for the PlayStation 4 and Microsoft Windows. Announced at TGS 2017, it is a non-canon spin-off story intended for Western audiences (similar to Insect Armageddon) with little relation to Sandlot's entries and an overall presentation intended to be "more serious than the series' traditional campy tone." Set in an alternate 2040 following years of conflict since the first alien invasion in 2028, the game follows the now-downtrodden EDF's Blast Team as they attempt to fight back against a world largely claimed by the aliens and insects, while also clashing with the Kindred Rebellion, a rebel army composed of disillusioned EDF soldiers.

==== Earth Defense Force: World Brothers (2020) ====
Earth Defense Force: World Brothers is a voxel graphics spin-off developed by Yuke's for the PlayStation 4, Nintendo Switch, and Microsoft Windows. It was released in Japan in 2020 in Japan and in North America and Europe in 2021. It features character-switching gameplay unique for the series, allowing the player to control a squad of four characters. World Brothers features a more light-hearted plot and tone than the rest of the series, and is intended as an homage to the series as a whole, featuring characters and references from previous entries. The plot revolves around the EDF's fight against aliens who manage to physically shatter Earth into multiple pieces, cutting off the EDF's divisions and preventing aid and resupplies. Unbeknownst to them, the aliens are under mind control by the Dark Tyrant, an evil entity seeking to destroy Earth; in a twist on the series' usual premise, the EDF tries to free the aliens and insects to team up with them against the Dark Tyrant.

==== Earth Defense Force: World Brothers 2 (2024) ====
Earth Defense Force: World Brothers 2 is a voxel graphics spin-off developed by Yuke's for the PlayStation 4, PlayStation 5, Nintendo Switch, and Microsoft Windows. It was released September 26th, 2024. The game features a similar plot to the original World Brothers, with the EDF investigating another shattering of Earth, this time caused by the Gaiark, an entity within the planet itself.

== Reception ==
Aggregate review scores As of April 12, 2019.
Game	Metacritic
Monster Attack	–
Global Defence Force Earth Defense Force 2: Invaders from Planet Space	– 72 (Note: Earth Defense Force 2: Invaders from Planet Space is the PlayStation Vita re-release of Global Defence Force.)
Global Defence Force Tactics	–
Earth Defense Force 2017	(Xbox 360) 69 (PS Vita) 68
Earth Defense Force: Insect Armageddon	(PC) 69 (Xbox 360) 68 (PS3) 63
Earth Defense Force 2025	(PS3) 69 (Xbox 360) 68
Earth Defense Force 5	(PS4) 72
Earth Defense Force: Iron Rain	(PS4) 69

Despite generally mixed reviews, the Earth Defense Force series, particularly from Earth Defense Force 2017 and onwards, has been described as having a cult following. Joe Juba of Game Informer defined Earth Defense Force 2017 as a cult classic, stating that "the developers at Sandlot clearly want to tell a story about humanity's struggle against giant invading ants and robots, and the passion for that story shines through despite its technical shortcomings"; in reviewing Earth Defense Force 5 five years later, he similarly opined that the series has "always had a single-minded commitment to one simple truth: It's fun to use weird weapons to blast lots of aliens." Though James Stephanie Sterling gave Earth Defense Force 2025 a negative review, she did acknowledge that the series "has managed to earn itself a fierce cult following through audacity alone".
