= Onechanbara: Bikini Samurai Squad =

2006 video game

OneChanbara: Bikini Samurai Squad
- North American game cover
- Developer: Tamsoft
- Publisher: D3 Publisher
- Designer: Shunsuke Tezuka
- Series: Onechanbara
- Platform: Xbox 360
- Release: JP: December 14, 2006; NA: February 10, 2009; EU: February 27, 2009
- Genre: Hack and slash
- Modes: Single-player, multiplayer

Onechanbara: Bikini Samurai Squad (お姉チャンバラvorteX ~忌血を継ぐ者たち~, Oneechanbara VorteX ~The Descendants of The Cursed Blood~) is a hack and slash horror video game released on December 14, 2006 in Japan, February 10, 2009 in North America and February 27 in Europe, by Tamsoft and D3 Publisher as part of D3's Simple series. It is the third main installment in the Onechanbara video game series and the first title to be released in North America.

== Gameplay ==
Aya in dress-up mode, during which players can change the outfits the girls wear during the game.

Players control Aya, Saki and Anna as they cut and shoot through waves of undead enemies, in either single-player or cooperative multi-player mode. In single-player mode the characters can be switched during play. The game features alternative modes of play; free play, quest and survival, as well as a dress-up option which allows players to alter the player characters' clothes. As the player defeats enemies two on-screen meters begin to fill. The first indicates the current character's splatter gauge, which increases as the character is covered in blood. Once filled, the character automatically goes into rampage mode, dealing more damage but also taking more damage from enemies while gradually and constantly losing health. The second indicates how much gore is on her weapon, uncleaned swords become dulled, and if the meter is filled the character's weapon will begin to lodge in enemies, forcing the player to manually remove it in order to continue fighting.

== Plot ==
After the defeat of Reiko, Saki regains control of herself, and the two sisters return to a somewhat more normal life. However, this newfound peace isn't set to last, as once again Tokyo is infested with zombies, and the cursed bloodline of the two sisters is set to clash once again with their own fates.

=== Characters ===
- Aya: Raised by her now-deceased father and trained by the sword, Aya lives a somewhat more normal life with her sister Saki before being thrust back into the zombie-infested battlefield. Her family bloodline is cursed and has a tendency of sending her into berserk frenzies. Her skills revolve around edged weapons, from swords to throwing knives, and certain attacks can damage or kill multiple enemies at close range.
- Saki: Saki is Aya's younger sister and shares her cursed bloodline. In addition to the sword that she carries, she has agility and martial art skills at her disposal, outmaneuvering foes and delivering precise attacks.
- Anna (misspelled as Annna in non-Japanese dubs): A special force soldier who meets and allies with the two sisters early in the game. Her military background gives her access to firearms, explosives, and some (although not quite as sophisticated as Saki's) mêlée combat techniques. Later in the game it is revealed that her brother David has been kidnapped and brainwashed by the game's antagonist Himiko.
- DLC - Himiko, Misery, Reiko

== Reception ==
Reception

Aggregate score
Aggregator	Score
Metacritic	39/100

Review scores
Publication	Score
1Up.com	B
Destructoid	4.5/10
Eurogamer	3/10
Famitsu	(X360) 29/40; 27/40
Game Informer	6/10
GamePro	1/5
GameSpot	2.5/10
GameZone	4/10
IGN	3/10
Official Xbox Magazine (US)	4.5/10
TeamXbox	2.7/10

The game received "unfavorable" reviews according to the review aggregation website Metacritic. In Japan, Famitsu gave it a score of one six and three sevens for a total of 27 out of 40, while Famitsu X360 gave it a score of one six, two sevens, and one nine for a total of 29 out of 40.
