= Steve Fawkner =

Australian software designer, programmer and composer (born 1968)

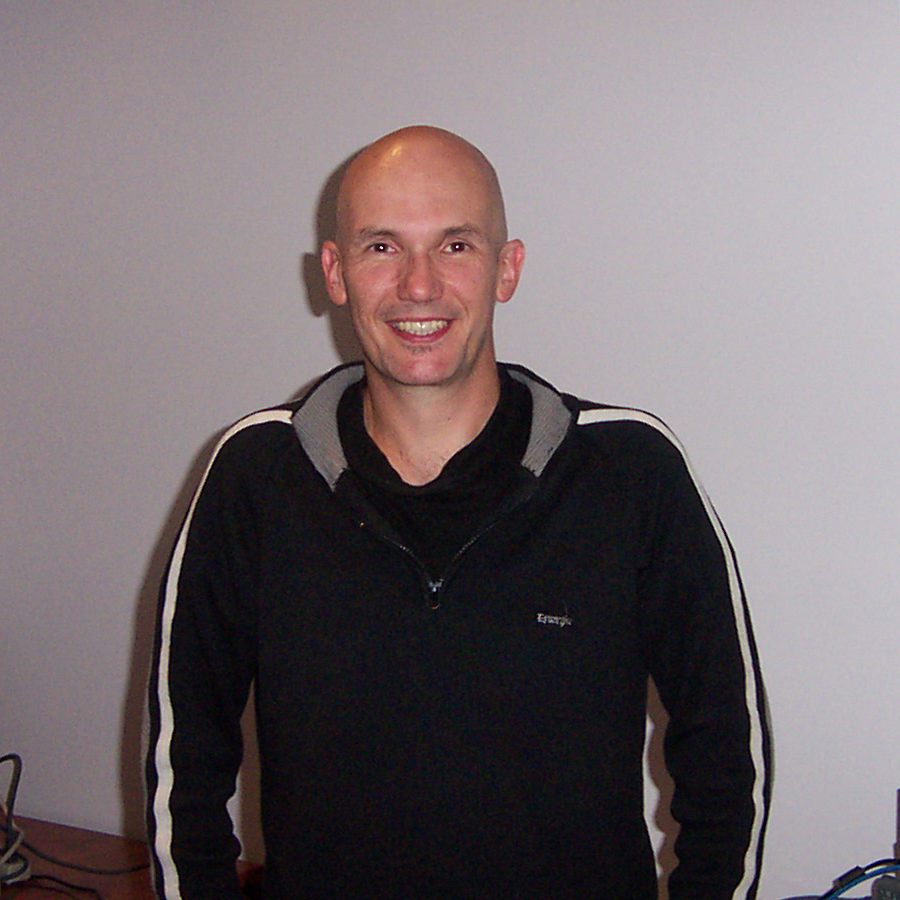
- Born: 13 December 1968 (age 57); Melbourne, Australia
- Occupation: Video game designer

Steve Fawkner is an Australian video game designer, programmer, and composer. He created the Warlords game series, first released in 1989, and the Puzzle Quest series which began in 2007.

== Career ==
Fawkner began his career in game development at the age of 15 with his first game, Quest for the Holy Grail, released in 1983 on the ZX Spectrum 48K.

In 1989, Steve Fawkner created Warlords for Amiga, blending RPG and turn-based strategy elements, believing it was a breakthrough. Publishers repeatedly rejected it, including his last hope, Strategic Studies Group (SSG), whose president tossed the demo disc in the trash, calling it "rubbish." The president's son retrieved it, enjoyed playing on his Amiga, and convinced his father to publish it—leading to three sequels, a physical card game, and the Warlords Battlecry spin-off series.

In 2003, after a long alliance with SSG, he split off to form his own game development company Infinite Interactive.

In 2007, Infinite Interactive put Puzzle Quest: Challenge of the Warlords on the market for the DS and PSP. It was a sleeper hit that received critical acclaim from gamers and game developers alike. Infinite Interactive has since ported Puzzle Quest to the Wii, Windows, Xbox 360, PS2, Mac, mobile, and iPhone.

In 2008, a Puzzle Quest spin-off game was developed on a number of platforms for D3 Publisher. Puzzle Quest: Galactrix was released on 24 February 2009. While critics praised the variety of the gameplay, it wasn't as well received as Puzzle Quest: Challenge of the Warlords. A full sequel to Puzzle Quest, Puzzle Quest 2, was released on 22 June 2010 and was seen as a return to form for the Puzzle Quest series.

Fawkner and Infinite Interactive licensed the game design to Boston-based Demiurge Studios to create Marvel Puzzle Quest: Dark Reign, while he worked on another project he called "Puzzle Quest and Warlords thrown together in a blender." Gems of War was released on 20 November 2014 and is still being supported with updates and events.

In 2016, as director of Infinity Plus Two, Steve designed and the company self published another mixed mechanic game called Tiny Quest. The game was released on iOS and Android in 2017. It was well received with plans to build on the game with a sequel.

== Games developed ==
- Puzzle Quest: Immortal Edition (2025), Infinity Plus 2
- Puzzle Quest 3 (2021), Infinity Plus 2
- Tiny Quest (2017), Infinity Plus 2
- Gems of War (2014), 505 Games Mobile
- Puzzle Quest 2 (2010), D3 Publisher
- Puzzle Chronicles (2010), Konami Digital Entertainment, Inc.
- Puzzle Kingdoms (2009), Zoo Games
- Neopets Puzzle Adventure (2009), Capcom
- Office Wars (2009)
- Puzzle Quest: Galactrix (2009), D3 Publisher of Europe Ltd.
- Puzzle Quest: Challenge of the Warlords (2007), D3 Publisher of Europe Ltd.
- Heroes of Might and Magic V (2006), Ubisoft Italia
- Warlords Battlecry III (2004), Enlight Interactive Inc.
- Decisive Battles of WWII Vol 2: Korsun Pocket (2003), Matrix Games
- Warlords IV: Heroes of Etheria (2003), Ubisoft
- Warlords Battlecry II (2002), Strategic Studies Group
- Reach for the Stars (2000), Strategic Simulations, Inc.
- Warlords Battlecry (2000), Strategic Simulations, Inc.
- Warlords III: Darklords Rising (1998), Red Orb Entertainment
- Warlords III: Reign of Heroes (1997), Red Orb Entertainment
- Warlords II Deluxe (1995), Strategic Studies Group
- Warlords II Scenario Builder (1994), Strategic Studies Group
- Carriers at War II (1993), Strategic Studies Group
- Warlords II (1993), Strategic Studies Group
- Warlords (1990), Strategic Studies Group
