= Puzzle Quest =

Video game series

- Genres: Puzzle, role-playing
- Developers: Infinity Plus Two; Demiurge Studios; Hibernum/Oktagon Games
- Publishers: D3 Publisher; 505 Games

Puzzle Quest is a series of puzzle video games where tile-matching serves as the combat for a role-playing video game. The first game, Puzzle Quest: Challenge of the Warlords, was released in 2007. It was designed by Steve Fawkner as a spin-off of the Warlords series of turn-based strategy games which were also created by Fawkner. The series has since expanded to other licensed content.

== Gameplay ==
The Puzzle Quest games are a hybrid of a tile-matching puzzle game with role-playing game elements. In nearly all games, players play with an avatar character against a computer opponent using a shared board of colored gems, and alternate turns matching gems on the board. By swapping two adjacent gems to match at least three gems of the same color in a row, a player can clear those gems and gain some benefit, such as directly damaging the opponent, earning colored mana to cast spells or use abilities, or gain gold or experience. Clearing matches allows other gems to fall into place, which can potentially create further matches and combos which also can be more valuable. Matches of four or five gems may also lead to additional turns. The goal in a match is to bring the opponent avatar's health to zero before one's own. Between matches, the player may then have the opportunity to improve their avatar such as using gold to buy equipment, learn new spells or skills, or otherwise prepare for more powerful opponents through the game's mechanics.

== Games ==
Release timeline
2007	Puzzle Quest: Challenge of the Warlords
2008
2009	Puzzle Quest: Galactrix
2010	Puzzle Quest 2
2011
2012
2013	Marvel Puzzle Quest
2014
2015	Adventure Time Puzzle Quest; Magic: The Gathering – Puzzle Quest
2016
2017
2018
2019	Puzzle Quest: The Legend Returns
2020
2021	Puzzle Quest 3
2022
2023
2024
2025	Puzzle Quest: Immortal Edition

=== Puzzle Quest: Challenge of the Warlords ===
Puzzle Quest: Challenge of the Warlords was developed by Australian company Infinite Interactive and first released on March 16, 2007. The game combines role-playing with tile-matching elements. Taking place in a high fantasy setting, the player moves his or her character around the game's world and encounters monsters and other enemies to fight so as to gain experience and acquire treasure as in a typical role-playing game. Puzzle Quest was a surprise hit at release and received generally positive reviews for the fusion of the two distinct video game genres.

=== Puzzle Quest: Galactrix ===
Puzzle Quest: Galactrix was developed by Infinite Interactive for Microsoft Windows, Nintendo DS, Xbox 360's Xbox Live Arcade, and PlayStation 3's PlayStation Network service, and first released on February 24, 2009. It has a science fiction setting.

=== Puzzle Quest 2 ===
Puzzle Quest 2 was developed by Infinite Interactive for the Nintendo DS, Xbox Live Arcade, iOS, Android, Windows Phone 7, and Microsoft Windows. It was released on June 22, 2010.

=== Marvel Puzzle Quest ===
Marvel Puzzle Quest was developed by Demiurge Studios and released by D3 Publisher and Marvel Entertainment on October 3, 2013. Players gather a number of heroes and villains from the Marvel Universe as they play, using in-game rewards to boost each character's abilities and overall power. Players select three characters to bring into matches, matching gems to trigger individual character's powers to damage their opponents.

=== Adventure Time Puzzle Quest ===
Adventure Time Puzzle Quest was developed and published by D3Publisher and released for mobile platforms on July 23, 2015. The game is set in and features characters from the animated series Adventure Time.

=== Magic: The Gathering – Puzzle Quest ===
Magic: The Gathering – Puzzle Quest was developed by Hibernium and released for mobile on December 15, 2015. The game incorporates the collectible card game mechanics of Magic: the Gathering by having players build a limited deck of cards, and match gems from the board to gather mana to play randomly-drawn cards each turn, and use a variety of spells and summoned creatures to try to damage their opponent.

=== Puzzle Quest: The Legend Returns ===
Puzzle Quest: The Legend Returns was developed by Infinity Plus 2 and released for Nintendo Switch on September 19, 2019. It is an enhanced remaster of the original Puzzle Quest, including the game's expansion pack and new, original content.

=== Puzzle Quest 3 ===
Puzzle Quest 3 was developed by Infinity Plus 2 and published by 505 Games for release on Microsoft Windows and iOS and Android devices on March 1, 2022. An early access form for Android was first released on March 26, 2021. Puzzle Quest 3 is a direct follow up of Puzzle Quest: Challenge of the Warlords. Compared to previous games, Puzzle Quest 3 has the player make as many matches as possible on the board in a two-second window, accumulating damage and mana for spells, followed by the enemy making an off-board attack on the player's character, which may impact the state of the board.

=== Puzzle Quest: Immortal Edition ===
Puzzle Quest: Immortal Edition was developed by Infinity Plus 2 and was released on September 18, 2025 for the Nintendo Switch, PlayStation 4, PlayStation 5, Windows, Xbox One, and Xbox Series X/S. It is a remastered version of the original Puzzle Quest and includes both the Revenge of the Plague Lord and Attack of the Golem Lord expansions from the previous releases as well as additional content new to the game.

== Reception ==
Mike Fahey of Kotaku praised the first Puzzle Quest in its Nintendo Switch re-release as Puzzle Quest: The Legend Returns, saying that the series "fell off a cliff" after that installment. He stated that "2010’s Puzzle Quest 2 added a layer of complexity with attack and defense and statistics that, while not entirely unwelcome, muddled the successful formula of its predecessor". Calling 2009's sci-fi Puzzle Quest: Galactrix "super-challenging and incredibly dense", he also called Marvel Puzzle Quest, Magic the Gathering – Puzzle Quest, and Adventure Time Puzzle Quest "free-to-play games that are hollow licensed shells, lacking the depth of story and strategy established in the original".

Fahey called the series "one of those rare instances where going back to the first game in a relatively long-running series isn’t a matter of rolling back years of innovation and improvement".
