= Warlords III =

1997 video game

Warlords III: Reign of Heroes
- Developer: Strategic Studies Group
- Publisher: Red Orb Entertainment
- Producer: Gregor Whiley
- Designer: Steve Fawkner
- Programmer: Steve Fawkner
- Artist: Nick Stathopoulos
- Writer: Steve Fawkner
- Composer: Steve Fawkner
- Series: Warlords
- Platform: Microsoft Windows
- Release: WW: August 12, 1997; Darklords Rising: NA: August 21, 1998; EU: 1998
- Genres: Computer wargame, 4x
- Modes: Single-player, multiplayer

Warlords III: Reign of Heroes is a computer wargame released in 1997, and the third release in the Warlords video game series. In 1998 it was followed by the expansion Warlords III: Darklords Rising.

Warlords III was a critical success but failed commercially, a performance that some commentators attributed to the rise of the real-time strategy genre.

== Gameplay ==
After a four-year hiatus, SSG developed Warlords III: Reign of Heroes.

The game was released for Microsoft Windows and used new system capabilities to dramatically improve graphics:

- animated armies' movements
- skinnable user interface
- several landscape options
- more advanced city graphics

The heroes acquired the ability to cast spells to receive the temporary benefit. Each spell has its price expressed in mana points, which became the second (after gold) resource in game.

The campaign system also became more advanced: the heroes from the previous game of the campaign followed the user to the new game, keeping their experience and items.

Another new feature of the Reign of Heroes is the flexible races concept: every player had a number of pre-defined units he was able to produce, and an additional number of units that could join him. This allowed for more consistent storyline in the campaigns and made players' advancement more challenging, as the natural production of the further cities normally wasn't matching the player's race.

Unlike the previous versions Reign of Heroes provided several hero classes. Each class has its own upgrade paths and costs of upgrade options. The upgrade options themselves became user-selectable, giving the player more control over the heroes' development.

The city levels in Reign of Heroes became more important, as in battles it equaled to city bonus. The players received ability to promote cities to next level for a fixed amount of gold.

The units received hit points, making more powerful units the harder targets for the weaker, and bringing more diversity to the army sets. The increased number of army bonuses led to more complicated battle outcome calculation. Furthermore, several army bonuses allowed respected armies to kill the more powerful enemies from the first attack, which made the battle outcome yet less predictable.

The concept of diplomacy was further refined by adding new state of diplomatic relations: Treaty. This state allowed players trespassing each other's cities and winning the Allied victory exterminating all other parties. Another diplomacy-related feature introduced in Reign of Heroes was the ability to bribe enemies, thus influencing their diplomatic decisions. The amount of bribe was fine-tunable; the more substantial bribe was, the greater chances of needed decision were.

In addition to the previously available multiplayer modes (hotseat and play by email) the Reign of Heroes introduced the ability to play over network.

The game CD included the soundtrack in CD-DA format.

== Development ==
Warlords III was announced in August 1996.

By the time of Warlords III games' releases the real-time strategy game genre was in full-swing, so there was less of a market for turn-based games. The oncoming rush of first-person shooters and first generation MMORPGs also didn't help the popularity of the series. The turn-based strategy genre in general would take a hit during this period.

== Reception ==
Warlords III: Reign of Heroes

Aggregate score
Aggregator	Score
GameRankings	84%

Review scores
Publication	Score
AllGame	3.5/5
CNET Gamecenter	8/10
Computer Games Strategy Plus	4/5
Computer Gaming World	5/5
GameRevolution	B
GameSpot	8.6/10
GameStar	74%
Next Generation	4/5
PC Gamer (US)	85%
PC Zone	90%

Reign of Heroes received favorable reviews. Next Generation said of the game, "For those who prefer the mellower pace of a turn-based environment, it's just about as good as it gets."

The game debuted in 15th place on PC Data's computer game sales rankings for September 1997 in the U.S. It was absent from the following month's chart. The game was commercially unsuccessful, with sales in the U.S. of 27,387 units by April 1999, according to PC Data. The Learning Company's K.C Conroe reported that the publisher was "baffled" by its performance. CNET Gamecenter's Marc Saltzman attributed the failure of the game to "the real-time strategy explosion" at the time of its release.

During the inaugural Interactive Achievement Awards, Warlords III was a finalist for the Academy of Interactive Arts & Sciences' "PC Sports Game of the Year" and "PC Strategy Game of the Year"; the latter ultimately went to StarCraft and Age of Empires (tied), while the former was awarded to FIFA Road to World Cup '98. The staff of Computer Games Strategy Plus named the game the best turn-based strategy game of 1997. The game was a runner-up for Computer Gaming World's 1997 "Strategy Game of the Year" award, which ultimately went to Myth: The Fallen Lords.

== Legacy ==
=== Expansion ===
Shortly after releasing Reign of Heroes, SSG followed with Warlords III: Darklords Rising, a stand-alone expansion pack, on August 21, 1998. It featured the new maps and units and contained the sample graphics to facilitate development of alternative tile, army and city sets. The plot of the main campaign continued where the previous game had left off.

This expansion pack, like Warlords II, had a campaign editor and realistic terrain model.

==== Reception ====
Warlords III: Darklords Rising

Aggregate score
Aggregator	Score
GameRankings	79%

Review scores
Publication	Score
AllGame	4.5/5
CNET Gamecenter	9/10
Computer Games Strategy Plus	4/5
Computer Gaming World	4.5/5
GamePro	4/5
GameSpot	8.9/10
GameStar	69%
IGN	8/10
Next Generation	4/5
PC Gamer (UK)	79%
PC Zone	90%

Darklords Rising received favorable reviews, albeit slightly less than the original Warlords III, according to the review aggregation website GameRankings. Next Generation said, "Whether playing the game as designed or creating your own worlds, you'll find Darklords quite mesmerizing. Old-timers should feel right at home with this version, and newcomers will quickly become enchanted."

The game was a finalist for Computer Games Strategy Plus's 1998 "Strategy Game of the Year" award, which ultimately went to Railroad Tycoon II. The staff wrote that the game "continued the Australian company's well-deserved reputation for quality games."

=== Card game ===
Warlords is an out-of-print collectible card game published in 1997 by Iron Crown Enterprises based on Warlords III. Warlords is a simple multi-player fantasy game. The objective is to become the first player to become the supreme Warlord. This is achieved by exploring, finding treasure, or waging war by assembling followers, gathering armies, and building citadels.

=== Follow-up games ===
Warlords III was followed by the Warlords Battlecry series of real-time strategy games.
