= Marvel Puzzle Quest =

2013 video game

- Developers: Demiurge Studios; WayForward Technologies (consoles)
- Publisher: 505 Games (Note: Originally published by D3 Go! until 2022.)
- Designers: Steve Fawkner; Will Jennings-Hess
- Series: Puzzle Quest
- Platforms: iOS, Android, Windows, PlayStation 3, PlayStation 4, Xbox 360, Xbox One, Kindle
- Release: iOS, Android; October 3, 2013; Windows; December 5, 2013; PS3, PS4, Xbox 360; October 16, 2015; Xbox One; February 4, 2016; Kindle; March 29, 2016
- Genre: Puzzle
- Modes: Single-player, multiplayer

Marvel Puzzle Quest is a puzzle video game developed by Demiurge Studios and was originally published by D3 Go! in 2013. The fourth installment in the Puzzle Quest series, it is a free-to-play, match-three battle game set in the Marvel universe.

Puzzle Quest was released for iOS, Android, and Windows (via Steam). A port by WayForward Technologies was released for PlayStation 3, PlayStation 4, and Xbox 360 in 2015, and Xbox One in 2016. An Amazon Kindle version was released in 2016.

== Gameplay ==
Players assemble a team of three Marvel characters, controlling the team against a team of up to three other superheroes or supervillains in match-three, turn-based battles. Each color-coded match does damage to the player's opponent, while creating action points which can obtain special skills. Gems disappear and are replenished from above as they are matched. When they are matched, the six colors of gems on the board grant energy that can be used to execute special moves.

Players trade hits back and forth until one of them is downed. When all enemies are downed the fight is over revealing a reward for the winner: one of the in-game currencies, special boosts or a new character. This character can be added to the player's roster. If it is a duplicate, it becomes a level-up cover. Players earn points by winning battles, and then apply the points to unlock new attacks and level up. The board is highly tactical, with up to half a dozen potential considerations beyond the best match at any given point.

There are two main modes: story and multiplayer, where the players can fight against other teams controlled by artificial intelligence. The game is free, with opportunities to purchase level-ups or new characters. New characters, a bundle of Iso-8, hero coins and other items can also be obtained by replaying old levels. As a player's roster expands, the possibilities for team composition and skill selection also expand.

A player collects in-game comic book covers to unlock new characters and improve existing ones. Each character has a set of real comic book covers associated with them, which represent the character's abilities and allow the player to improve the character's abilities or level them up. In July 2014, Team-Ups were introduced, allowing a player to battle with single-use abilities from characters that aren't part of the player's teams. Characters are ranked in different tiers using stars. They range from one star characters which are the weakest to six star characters which are the strongest and most powerful.

== Plot ==
The story involves a powerful new substance called Iso-8 and Norman Osborn's attempts to supplant S.H.I.E.L.D. There are five missions to stop Osborn on his worldwide terror spree. The original story is based on the "Dark Reign" storyline and was written by Frank Tieri and Alex Irvine. Irvine also wrote other player versus environment events of the game, such as “Webbed Wonder,” where Spider-Man teams up with Howard the Duck to find out Aunt May's whereabouts.

== Characters ==
The game features an array of classic Marvel heroes and villains, including Spider-Man, Captain America, Wolverine, Iron Man, Thor, Black Widow, Storm, and Magneto, along with lesser-known characters like Moonstone. In commemoration of the game's first anniversary, Thor: Goddess of Thunder, the female version of Thor, was added on October 17, 2014, making Marvel Puzzle Quest the first video game to feature the character. Devil Dinosaur was also added as a playable character for the anniversary, via an anniversary pack and as a daily reward for those who had been playing for over a year. Other characters that have been added since the game's inception include Blade in October 2014 and Cyclops in February 2015. Kamala Khan, who was announced as a new Marvel character in November 2013 and is the first Muslim superhero to lead a comic book series, was featured in the game. The game has steadily received two new characters per month.

Nine variants of existing characters were created specially for the game: a Peggy Carter who became Captain America, and eventually got both a comics version as part of the Exiles, and an animated version in the show What If...?; two more empowered Carters, an "Iron Carter" wearing a version of Iron Man's armor, and another who wielded Mjolnir and thus received all the powers of Thor; Wolverine (Samurai Daken), where Wolverine's son takes on his father's codename as an atonement for killing him; Deadpool (Spirit of Vengeance), a Deadpool who became a Ghost Rider; Devpool, a Deadpool that was an eSports star in his universe only be transported to another world to work as a developer on Marvel Puzzle Quest; Hit-Monkey (E.D.I. Suit), wearing a suit mimicking Loki's powers from a dead mercenary; Omega Red (Horseman of Pestilence), who was recruited by Apocalypse to join his Horsemen; and Vulture (Armor Wars), wearing an armor built by Justin Hammer from reverse-engineered Stark tech.

== Development ==
The first Puzzle Quest game, Puzzle Quest: Challenge of the Warlords, was conceived and designed by Australian game designer Steve Fawkner, the original designer of the Warlords computer game series, which he created in 1989. In creating Puzzle Quest, Fawkner was inspired by his love of the tile-matching puzzle video game Bejeweled. Puzzle Quest: Challenge of the Warlords was picked up by D3 Publisher and released on March 20, 2007, for the Nintendo DS and PlayStation Portable. It was an instant success, winning a 2008 Academy of Interactive Arts & Sciences award for Downloadable Game of the Year. It was also nominated for Handheld Game of the Year. Versions for Xbox Live Arcade, Wii, Windows, PlayStation 2 and mobile followed later that year. It was released for PlayStation 3 and iOS in late 2008.

Marvel Puzzle Quest was launched worldwide by D3 Publisher and Marvel Entertainment on October 3, 2013. It was the second game developed internally by Demiurge Studios. The game was originally titled Marvel Puzzle Quest: Dark Reign, before the subtitle "Dark Reign" was dropped following a July 2014 update. D3 Publisher stated that the revised title signified the beginning of the game's expansion beyond the "Dark Reign" storyline.

On February 18, 2015, Sega Networks acquired Demiurge Studios, but the acquisition did not include the rights to Marvel Puzzle Quest.

In early June 2022, it was announced that live operations of Marvel Puzzle Quest had been passed over to Broken Circle Studios, who had at that point been working on the game for several months. Soon after, 505 Games would acquire D3 Go! and, as such, would take over publication of the game.

== Reception ==
IGN rated the game a 9.1 out of 10, writing, "Marvel Puzzle Quest has taken the idea of a puzzle game with a strategic/role-playing element overlay, and turned it into an intricately crafted, remarkably deep experience". IGN added that the game is "compelling at each level" with "constant challenges and goals to work toward". Touch Arcade awarded it four out of five stars, calling it "compulsively, sickeningly playable" and writing that, in comparison to other Puzzle Quest games, Marvel Puzzle Quest is more calculated and strategic, with a focus on team fighting rather than individual combat. The game has received a rating of 74 on Metacritic. MacLife said it "does a good job of spicing up the match-three genre for comic fans".

Marvel Puzzle Quest is a 2014 Tabby Award Best Android Apps and Games winner in the Game: Puzzle, Cards & Family category.

Peter Rubin, Contributing Editor at Wired Magazine, wrote a feature length article about the game 7 years after release, Marvel Puzzle Quest Might Just Be My Forever Game

== See also ==
- List of video games based on Marvel Comics
