= Puzzle Kingdoms =

2009 video game

- Developer: Infinite Interactive
- Publishers: NA: Zoo Games; EU: Zushi Games
- Platforms: Nintendo DS, Wii, Windows
- Release: May 5, 2009: Nintendo DS; NA: May 5, 2009; EU: July 31, 2009 Wii; NA: May 13, 2009; EU: July 31, 2009 Windows April 16, 2009
- Genres: Puzzle, turn-based strategy

Puzzle Kingdoms is a puzzle video game developed by Infinite Interactive for PC, Nintendo DS, and Wii. The PC version is available to download online through services such as IGN's Direct2Drive and Steam.

Like Infinite Interactive's previous game Puzzle Quest: Challenge of the Warlords, Puzzle Kingdom relies on a core combat mechanic similar to Bejeweled, though this offering incorporates turn-based strategy elements as well. Puzzle Kingdom also shares the same game universe as Puzzle Quest, the fantasy world of Etheria from the Warlords game series.

== Reception ==
Reception

Aggregate scores
Aggregator	Score	
Aggregator	DS	Wii
GameRankings	64.36%	59.11%
Metacritic	64/100	63/100

Review scores
Publication	Score	
Publication	DS	Wii
GameSpot	7/10	7/10
GamesRadar+	3.5/5	3.5/5
GameZone	5.7/10	7.3/10
IGN	6.3/10	7/10

Puzzle Kingdoms received mixed reviews from critics upon release. On Metacritic, the game holds scores of 64/100 for the DS version based on 12 reviews, and 63/100 for the Wii version based on 11 reviews. On GameRankings, the game holds scores of 64.36% for the DS version based on 11 reviews, and 59.11% for the Wii version based on 9 reviews.

== See also ==
- List of puzzle video games
