= 1st Annual Interactive Achievement Awards =

American video game awards

- Date: May 28, 1998
- Venue: Georgia World Congress Center
- Country: Atlanta, Georgia, USA

Highlights
- Most awards: GoldenEye 007 (4)
- Most nominations: Final Fantasy VII; GoldenEye 007; Riven: The Sequel to Myst (6)
- Interactive Title of the Year: GoldenEye 007
- Hall of Fame: Shigeru Miyamoto

The 1st Annual Interactive Achievement Awards was the 1st edition of the Interactive Achievement Awards, an annual awards event that honored the best games in the video game industry during 1997 and the first three months of 1998. The awards were arranged by the Academy of Interactive Arts & Sciences (AIAS) and were held on the first day of E3 1998 at the Georgia World Congress Center in Atlanta, Georgia. There was not an official host of the award ceremony. All titles eligible for nomination were publicly release in North America between January 1, 1997 and March 31, 1998.

Final Fantasy VII, GoldenEye 007, and Riven: The Sequel to Myst were tied for receiving the most nominations. GoldenEye 007 took home the most awards, including "Interactive Title of the Year". Electronic Arts received the most nominations and had the most nominated games. Electronic Arts also tied with Broderbund for having the most awarded games. Developer Rare won the most awards of the event, while Sony Computer Entertainment and Nintendo tied for most wins as publishers. Rare and Broderbund were the only developers with more than one award-winning game. There was a tie between Age of Empires and StarCraft for "PC Strategy Game of the Year". Carmen Sandiego had two award-winning titles for the PC awards "Edutainment" and "Skills Building" with Where in Time Is Carmen Sandiego? and Carmen Sandiego Word Detective, respectively. There was a category for "Arcade Game of the Year" in the initial category listing, but there weren't any finalists named for the category. This would be the only year "Interactive Title of the Year" was offered, and would be renamed "Game of the Year" going forward.

Shigeru Miyamoto, creator of several of Nintendo franchises including Donkey Kong, Mario, The Legend of Zelda, F-Zero, and Star Fox, was the first inductee of the Academy of Interactive Arts & Sciences Hall of Fame.

== Winners and Nominees ==
Winners are listed first, highlighted in boldface, and indicated with a double dagger (‡).

**Interactive Title of the Year**
- **GoldenEye 007** — **Rare**, **Nintendo**‡
  - Age of Empires — Ensemble Studios, Microsoft
  - Blade Runner — Westwood Studios, Virgin Interactive
  - Final Fantasy VII — SquareSoft, Sony Computer Entertainment
  - PaRappa the Rapper — NanaOn-Sha, Sony Computer Entertainment
  - Quake II — id Software, Activision
  - Riven: The Sequel to Myst — Cyan Worlds, Red Orb Entertainment
  - Turok: Dinosaur Hunter — Iguana Entertainment, Acclaim Entertainment

=== Craft Awards ===
**Outstanding Achievement in Interactive Design**: **PaRappa the Rapper** — **NanaOn-Sha**, **Sony Computer Entertainment**‡; Dungeon Keeper — Bullfrog Productions, Electronic Arts; Final Fantasy VII — SquareSoft, Sony Computer Entertainment; GoldenEye 007 — Rare, Nintendo	**Outstanding Achievement in Art/Graphics**: **Riven: The Sequel to Myst** — **Cyan Worlds**, **Red Orb Entertainment**‡; Blade Runner — Westwood Studios, Virgin Interactive; Final Fantasy VII — SquareSoft, Sony Computer Entertainment; GoldenEye 007 — Rare, Nintendo; Oddworld: Abe's Oddysee — Oddworld Inhabitants, GT Interactive; The Curse of Monkey Island — LucasArts
**Outstanding Achievement in Sound and Music**: **PaRappa the Rapper** — **NanaOn-Sha**, **Sony Computer Entertainment**‡; Fallout — Black Isle Studios, Interplay Productions; Interstate '76 — Activision; Oddworld: Abe's Oddysee — Oddworld Inhabitants, GT Interactive; Outlaws — LucasArts; Star Trek: Starfleet Academy — High Voltage Software, Interplay Productions	**Outstanding Achievement in Software Engineering**: **GoldenEye 007** — **Rare**, **Nintendo**‡; Blade Runner — Westwood Studios, Virgin Interactive; Microsoft Flight Simulator 98 — Aces Game Studio, Microsoft; NFL GameDay 98 — Sony Interactive Studios America; NFL Quarterback Club 98 — Iguana Entertainment, Acclaim Entertainment; Star Trek: Starfleet Academy — High Voltage Software, Interplay Productions; Temujin — SouthPeak Interactive; Ultima Online — Origin Systems, Electronic Arts

=== Content Awards ===
==== Console ====
**Console Game of the Year (Note: All finalists for console awards are finalists for Console Game of the Year.)**: **GoldenEye 007** — **Rare**, **Nintendo**‡
**Console Action Game of the Year**: **GoldenEye 007** — **Rare**, **Nintendo**‡; Crash Bandicoot 2: Cortex Strikes Back — Naughty Dog, Sony Computer Entertainment; Gex: Enter the Gecko — Crystal Dynamics, Midway Games; Resident Evil 2 — Capcom; Turok: Dinosaur Hunter — Iguana Entertainment, Acclaim Entertainment	**Console Adventure Game of the Year**: **Final Fantasy VII** — **SquareSoft**, **Sony Computer Entertainment**‡; Castlevania: Symphony of the Night — Konami; Oddworld: Abe's Oddysee — Oddworld Inhabitants, GT Interactive; Resident Evil 2 — Capcom; Riven: The Sequel to Myst — Cyan Worlds, Acclaim Entertainment
**Console Fighting Game of the Year**: **WCW vs. nWo: World Tour** — **Asmik Ace Entertainment**, **THQ**‡; Bloody Roar — Hudson Soft, Sony Computer Entertainment; Bushido Blade — Lightweight, Sony Computer Entertainment; Street Fighter EX Plus α — Arika, Capcom; WCW Nitro — Inland Productions, THQ	**Console Racing Game of the Year**: **Diddy Kong Racing** — **Rare**‡; Mario Kart 64 — Nintendo EAD; Moto Racer — Delphine Software International, Electronic Arts; NASCAR 98 — Stormfront Studios, Electronic Arts
**Console Role-Playing Game of the Year**: **Final Fantasy VII** — **SquareSoft**, **Sony Computer Entertainment**‡; Alundra — Matrix Software, Working Designs, Sony Computer Entertainment, Psygnosis; Suikoden — Konami; Wild Arms — Media.Vision, Sony Computer Entertainment	**Console Sports Game of the Year**: **International Superstar Soccer 64** — **Konami**‡; NASCAR 98 — Stormfront Studios, Electronic Arts; NBA Live 98 — EA Canada; NFL GameDay 98 — Sony Interactive Studios America; NFL Quarterback Club 98 — Iguana Entertainment, Acclaim Entertainment; World Series Baseball '98 — Sega

==== Personal Computer ====
**Computer Entertainment Title of the Year (Note: All finalists for personal computer awards are finalists for Computer Entertainment Title of the Year.)**: **StarCraft** — **Blizzard Entertainment**‡
**PC Action Game of the Year**: **Quake II** — **id Software**, **Activision**‡; Carmageddon Max Pack — Stainless Games, Interplay Productions; Die By the Sword — Treyarch, Interplay Productions; Star Wars Jedi Knight: Dark Forces II — LucasArts; Redneck Rampage — Xatrix Entertainment, Interplay Productions; Wing Commander: Prophecy — Origin Systems, Electronic Arts	**PC Adventure Game of the Year**: **Blade Runner** — **Westwood Studios**, **Virgin Interactive**‡; Realms of the Haunting — Gremlin Interactive, Interplay Productions; Riven: The Sequel to Myst — Cyan Worlds, Red Orb Entertainment; Tex Murphy: Overseer — Access Software; The Curse of Monkey Island — LucasArts; The Journeyman Project 3: Legacy of Time — Presto Studios, Red Orb Entertainment
**PC Role-Playing Game of the Year**: **Dungeon Keeper** — **Bullfrog Productions**, **Electronic Arts**‡; Fallout — Black Isle Studios, Interplay Productions; Lands of Lore: Guardians of Destiny — Westwood Studios, Virgin Interactive Entertainment	**PC Simulation Game of the Year**: **Microsoft Flight Simulator 98** — **Aces Game Studio**, **Microsoft**‡; F-22: Air Dominance Fighter — Digital Image Design, Infogrames; Jane's Combat Simulations: F-15 — EA Baltimore; Jane's Combat Simulations: Longbow 2 — Origin Systems, Electronic Arts; Star Trek: Starfleet Academy — High Voltage Software, Interplay Productions
**PC Sports Game of the Year**: **FIFA Road to World Cup 98** — **EA Canada**‡; Links LS 1998 — Access Software; NBA Action '98 — Visual Concepts, Sega; NHL 98 — EA Canada; Virtual Pool 2 — Celeris, VR Sports, Interplay Productions; Warlords III: Reign of Heroes — Strategic Studies Group, Red Orb Entertainment	**PC Strategy Game of the Year (Note: Ties between finalists.)**: **Age of Empires** — **Ensemble Studios**, **Microsoft**‡; **StarCraft** — **Blizzard Entertainment**‡; Command & Conquer Gold — Westwood Studios, Virgin Interactive Entertainment; Sid Meier's Gettysburg! — Firaxis Games, Electronic Arts; Total Annihilation — Cavedog Entertainment, GT Interactive; Warlords III: Reign of Heroes — Strategic Studies Group, Red Orb Entertainment
**PC Creativity Title of the Year**: **Orly's Draw-A-Story** — **ToeJam & Earl Productions**, **Broderbund**‡; Barbie Cool Looks Fashion Designer — Mattel Media; Disney's Magic Artist — ImageBuilder Software, Disney Interactive; Print Artist Platinum — Sierra Home; Print Master Platinum 4.0 — Mindscape; The American Girls Premiere — The Learning Company	**PC Edutainment Title of the Year**: **Where in Time Is Carmen Sandiego?** — **Broderbund**, **The Learning Company**‡; Ariel's Story Studio — Media Station, Disney Interactive; Crayola Magic Wardrobe — Hyperspace Cowgirls, IBM; Reader Rabbit's 1st Grade — KnowWare, The Learning Company; Sesame Street: Elmo's Preschool Deluxe — Children's Television Workshop, The Learning Company
**PC Family/Kids Title of the Year**: **Lego Island** — **Mindscape**‡; Backyard Baseball — Humongous Entertainment, GT Interactive; Secret Paths in the Forest — Purple Moon, Media Concrete, Convivial; The Oregon Trail 3rd Edition: Pioneer Adventures — MECC, The Learning Company; Tonka Search and Rescue — Media Station, Hasbro Interactive; Ultimate Family Tree — Palladium Interactive	**PC Skills Building Title of the Year**: **Carmen Sandiego Word Detective** — **Broderbund**‡; Disney's Learning: Ready to Read with Pooh — Disney Interactive; Inside the SAT and ACT 98 Deluxe — The Princeton Review, Mindscape; JumpStart 2nd Grade Math — Knowledge Adventure; The ClueFinders' 3rd Grade Adventures — The Learning Company

==== Online ====
**Online Game of the Year**: **Ultima Online** — **Origin Systems**, **Electronic Arts**‡; Air Warrior II — Kesmai, Interactive Magic; Aliens Online — Kesmai, Mythic Entertainment, Fox Interactive; GemStone III — Simutronics; SubSpace — Burst Studios, Virgin Interactive
**Online Entertainment Site of the Year**: **Bezerk** — **Berkeley Systems**, **Jellyvision**‡; Comedy Central Online; Disney's Daily Blast - Disney Interactive; Entertainment Asylum — AOL; NBC TV's Home on the Web	**Online News/Information Site of the Year**: **CNN Online**‡; ABC News Online; Discovery Channel Online; ESPN Sportszone; GameSpot; The Wall Street Journal Online; The Washington Post Online

=== Hall of Fame Award ===
- Shigeru Miyamoto

=== Multiple nominations and awards ===
==== Multiple Nominations ====
Any game that was nominated for a console genre award was also a nominee for "Console Game of the Year". The same can be applied to nominees for personal computer awards and "Computer Entertainment Title of the Year".

Games that received multiple nominations
Nominations	Game
6	Final Fantasy VII
6	GoldenEye 007
6	Riven: The Sequel to Myst
5	Blade Runner
4	Oddworld: Abe's Oddysee
4	Star Trek: Starfleet Academy
3	Age of Empires
3	Dungeon Keeper
3	Fallout
3	Microsoft Flight Simulator 98
3	NASCAR 98
3	NFL GameDay 98
3	NFL Quarterback Club 98
3	PaRappa the Rapper
3	Quake II
3	Resident Evil 2
3	The Curse of Monkey Island
3	Turok: Dinosaur Hunter
3	Warlords III: Reign of Heroes
2 (Note: Only listing games that were neither nominated for a console nor personal computer award.)	Ultima Online

Nominations by company
Nominations	Games	Company
24	10	Electronic Arts
21	8	Sony Computer Entertainment
17	7	Interplay Productions
12	6	The Learning Company
10	4	Virgin Interactive
9	3	Red Orb Entertainment
9	3	Westwood Studios
8	3	Acclaim Entertainment
8	3	GT Interactive
8	2	Nintendo
8	2	Rare
7	4	Disney Interactive
6	3	Broderbund
6	3	Konami
6	3	LucasArts
6	3	Mindscape
6	3	Origin Systems
6	2	Iguana Entertainment
6	2	Microsoft
6	1	Cyan Worlds
6	1	SquareSoft
5	2	Capcom
4	2	Activision
4	2	Media Station
4	2	Sega
4	2	THQ
4	1	High Voltage Software
4	1	Oddworld Inhabitants
3	1	Black Isle Studios
3	1	Bullfrog Productions
3	1	Ensemble Studios
3	1	NanaOn-Sha
3	1	Strategic Studies Group
2 (Note: Only listing companies that did not receive a nomination for a console or personal computer award.)	1	Kesmai

==== Multiple Awards ====
Games that received multiple awards
Awards	Game
4	GoldenEye 007
2	Final Fantasy VII
2	PaRappa the Rapper
2	StarCraft

Awards by company
Awards	Games	Company
5	2	Rare
4	2	Sony Computer Entertainment
4	1	Nintendo
3	3	Broderbund
3	3	Electronic Arts
2	2	Microsoft
2	1	Blizzard Entertainment
2	1	NanaOn-Sha
2	1	SquareSoft
