= Warlords Battlecry II =

2002 video game

- Developer: Strategic Studies Group
- Publisher: Ubi Soft
- Producer: Gregor Whiley
- Designer: Steve Fawkner
- Programmers: Dean Farmer; Steve Fawkner; Mick Robertson
- Artist: Alister Lockhart
- Composer: Steve Fawkner
- Series: Warlords
- Platform: Microsoft Windows
- Release: NA: March 12, 2002; EU: April 5, 2002
- Genres: RTS, role-playing video game
- Modes: Single-player, multiplayer

Warlords Battlecry II is a real-time strategy and role-playing game, developed by Strategic Studies Group (SSG) as the sequel to Warlords Battlecry. It was released on March 12, 2002. The game requires the player to build buildings and create units in order to defeat the enemy, while sending their hero on optional quests.

The game is set within the world of Etheria. The player creates and assumes the role of a "Hero", and must take control of one of the twelve races and capture all 67 regions of the land in a non-linear manner. There are twelve different playable races, each with their own type of Hero, buildings and resource dependencies.

The game was well received by critics and users alike, with an average score of 82/100 on Metacritic. Warlords Battlecry III, the sequel to the game, was released in 2004.

== Gameplay ==
In-game screenshot, showing the daemon race attacking the humans.

Primarily a real-time strategy game, the main objective of Warlords Battlecry II is to build up a base and army in order to fight enemies. A game will usually end when all but one of the players has been defeated, although there are some minor differences depending on which victory condition is selected. Most buildings and units are created by spending resources, while some buildings and units can also be summoned by certain units.

There are twelve different playable races, each with its own strengths, weaknesses and resource dependencies. There are roughly a hundred and forty controllable units which will fight and, in some cases, build buildings.

The game also features some basic role-playing video game elements including leveling-up characters and completing optional quests. In addition to these units, the player controls a Hero which they have created before playing. The Hero is a unique unit which, as well as being able to fight and build buildings, can cast spells and receive quests. Depending on the outcome of a battle, the Hero will receive experience points and level up, as is common in many role-playing games.

There are two main game modes: the campaign and skirmish mode. The campaign is non-linear, with a goal of conquering the entire continent of Etheria (the land in which the game is set). Skirmish games can be played against computer-controlled enemies and other human players. All the game modes and victory conditions available in the campaign are playable, as well as some multiplayer-only modes. The game also comes with a level editor.

== Development ==
On October 4, 2001, SSG announced that a sequel to Warlords Battlecry was in development and was at the stages of beta-testing. The game was slated to feature a non-linear campaign (as opposed to the linear, story-driven campaign of the game's predecessor) and feature almost a hundred and forty different unit types (sixty of which would be brand new), twelve races (nine from the previous game, three created specifically for this game), 20 hero classes and more than a hundred spells and special abilities.

Six days later, on October 10, 2001, a new official website was launched, featuring a summary of the game's features as well as screenshots, desktop wallpapers, message boards and information on the armies and races. Over the following months, details concerning the units and races were added to the website. After the game's release the website provided a source of official downloads. Patches, custom AIs, scenarios and tools were made available to download.

On February 5, 2002, SSG released a 100MB demo of the game. It featured two maps, two playable races, and two spell spheres. It was made available for download from the German Ubisoft website. Ubisoft announced on February 21 that the game had gone gold and was on target for its release date of March 12. This target was met and on March 12 the game was released across the U.S., with a retail price of $39.99.

== Critical reception ==
Warlords Battlecry II

Aggregate scores
Aggregator	Score
GameRankings	82.75/100
Metacritic	82/100

Review scores
Publication	Score
GameRevolution	B
GameSpot	8.2/10
GameSpy	85/100
GameZone	8.2/10
IGN	8.5/10
PC Gamer (US)	90/100

The campaign map of Etheria. Warlords Battlecry II was praised for replacing the story-driven campaign of its predecessor with a non-linear campaign.

The game generally received positive reviews, with Metacritic giving an average score of 82 out of 100 ("generally favourable reviews"). PC Gamer US described the game as "welcome on my computer for a long time to come", in particular praising the non-linear campaign and the sheer scope of the game, awarding it 90%. IGN stated that "...[Warlords Battlecry II] may not have a ton of really noticeable new things when it comes down to the real-time strategy aspect of play, but it definitely had enough to draw me through my jaded curtain and get me playing and interested again". It too praised the campaign, giving the game an overall rating of 8.5 out of a possible 10.

GameSpot named Battlecry II a runner-up for its March 2002 "PC Game of the Month" award. While describing the game as "a solid real-time strategy game" and giving it a rating of 8.2 out of 10, the publication noted that "[the game] doesn't take a big leap forward". According to the game's Metacritic page, this was an opinion held by many reviewers.

UGO praised the AI, stating, "It seldom uses a tank rush until the very end. Rather, it'll often feint, spy and harass you. It'll often send its hero to convert your mines, to draw your units away from your town to chase him back to his city hall, while other units invade your area. It'll send minor units to hack at your buildings, and it is very good at hiding its numbers using the Fog of War. At the start of a campaign, the computer is pretty much a pushover, but as the game progresses, you'll often find your hands full."

According to the game's official website, the game received three awards: PC Gamer US' Editor's Choice award, Computer Gaming World's Editor's Choice award and Computer Games Magazines' Editor's Choice award.

The editors of Computer Games Magazine named Warlords Battlecry II the fifth-best computer game of 2002, and wrote that it "manages to take elements of some of the best games out there—Total Annihilation, StarCraft—and create something that works better than most of its influences." It also received the magazine's "Best Interface" award. Warlords Battlecry II was nominated for Computer Gaming World's 2002 "Strategy Game of the Year" award, which ultimately went to Freedom Force. The editors called Battlecry II "a perfect example of an honest-to-god RPS (role-playing strategy)", but explained that its relative lack of innovation "kept it from grabbing the gold."
