= Warlords Battlecry =

2000 video game

- Developer: Strategic Studies Group
- Publisher: Strategic Simulations
- Producer: Gregor Whiley
- Designer: Steve Fawkner
- Programmers: Steve Fawkner; Mick Robertson; Dean Farmer
- Artists: Alister Lockhart; Steve Fawkner; Janeen Fawkner
- Composer: Steve Fawkner
- Series: Warlords
- Platform: Microsoft Windows
- Release: NA: June 26, 2000; EU: September 1, 2000
- Genre: Real-time strategy
- Modes: Single-player, multiplayer

Warlords Battlecry, sometimes mislabeled as Warlords 3: Battlecry, is a real-time strategy video game released in 2000 for Microsoft Windows. It was the first of new series of RTS games set in Steve Fawkner's Warlords franchise.

== Gameplay ==
The game introduced a hero-building system, combining real time strategy elements with roleplaying elements (hero development, stats and skills). This makes the series the first to be called "roleplaying strategy", a term coined by its creator, Steve Fawkner. There are nine races organized in sets of three:

- The Civilized races: Human, Dwarf and Undead
- The Primitive races: Barbarians, Orcs and Minotaurs
- The Elvish/Magical races: High Elf, Wood Elf and Dark Elf

There are four professions, Warrior, Wizard, Rogue, and Priest. Each profession has at least three specialties, which give access to different skills and spheres of magic.

The game also featured a campaign, which follows a Human Hero from Guardia as he seeks to recover the two tears of dawn. At a pivotal moment, the campaign will branch out into two paths. In the path of light in which the Hero continues to follow orders from his general while resolving to recover Navarre. In the path of darkness, the Hero turns on Guardia and seeks to take Lucifus before Navarre and ultimately, take revenge.

== Reception ==
Reception

Aggregate score
Aggregator	Score
Metacritic	82/100

Review scores
Publication	Score
CNET Gamecenter	8/10
Computer Games Strategy Plus	4.5/5
Computer Gaming World	4/5
Eurogamer	7/10
Game Informer	8.75/10
GamePro	4/5
GameRevolution	B
GameSpot	8.4/10
GameSpy	79%
GameZone	7.5/10
IGN	8.4/10
Next Generation	4/5
PC Gamer (US)	88%

The game received "favorable" reviews according to the review aggregation website Metacritic. Jim Preston of NextGen said of the game, "Players who look underneath the ordinary surface will find a highly entertaining mix of strategy and role-playing."

The game was commercially unsuccessful in the U.S., and journalists Mark Asher and Tom Chick noted that it "didn't even hit PC Data's charts". Writing for CNET Gamecenter, Asher reported in September 2000 that the game's sales in the U.S. had reached 8,608 units, which drew revenues of $332,662.

The staff of Computer Games Magazine nominated the game for their 2000 "Real-time Strategy Game of the Year" award, whose winner remains unknown. It was nominated for the "Best Game No One Played" award at GameSpot's Best and Worst of 2000 Awards, which went to Allegiance.

== Sequels ==
Two sequels were released: Warlords Battlecry II in 2002 and Warlords Battlecry III in 2004.

Although released in different times, the three games essentially share the same 2D graphics engine, a gameplay closely resembling that of Warcraft II: Tides of Darkness or StarCraft and have a high number of playable races/sides (ranging from the 9 of WBC 1, to the 12 of WBC II and the 16 of WBC III).

The games feature a hero building system which preceded Warcraft III's own one and combine real time strategy elements with roleplaying elements (hero development, stats and skills), thus making its creator labelling the series as "roleplaying strategy" games.

Although the games share the same basic gameplay and graphics engine, and the series is generally well received among Warlords fans and hunters, the community around them has always been small (but loyal), and no serious modding efforts have been done until the third installment was released, although all three installments ended up supported by community (Fan patches) rather than developer patches and mods.
