= Magic: The Gathering – Puzzle Quest =

2015 mobile puzzle video game

- Developer: Webcore Games (Note: formerly developed by Hibernum and Oktagon Games.)
- Publisher: 505 Games (Note: Published by D3 Go! until 2022.)
- Platforms: iOS, Android
- Release: WW: December 15, 2015
- Genre: Puzzle
- Mode: Single-player

Magic: The Gathering – Puzzle Quest is a puzzle video game that combines the gem-matching concept in Puzzle Quest and its sequels, with the collectible card game aspects of Magic: The Gathering. It was released for mobile systems in December 2015.

== Gameplay ==
Magic: The Gathering – Puzzle Quest puts the player in the role of one of several Planeswalkers that fight against a number of enemies including other Planeswalkers. At the start of the game, the player gains access to one Planeswalker and a number of cards. As they progress in the game, the player gains in-game currency that can be used to level up the Planeswalker, which increases their health and unlocks certain in-game abilities, or to spend on card packs to expand their card libraries. The game also allows for microtransactions to purchase new card packs. Outside of a match, the player can adjust the cards in their Planeswalker library. As in Magic, the cards are generally tied to one or more of the five Mana colors: white, blue, black, red or green. A Planeswalker is associated with one specific Mana color and can only use cards that have that Mana type. Cards represent three major categories of spells: summon spells to bring creatures to the playfield to fight, spells that can affect creatures in various ways, and support cards that affect the board in various ways.

In a match, the player is pitted against another opponent who holds their own deck of cards and health. The player and opponent start with three random dealt cards, placed in order, in their hand. To cast a card, the players match gems through swapping of two adjacent gems on a gem board that represents the five Mana colors as well as a colorless "Loyalty" gem type that is used to enable the Planeswalker skills. Unlike traditional Magic, the mana gained from these gems is colorless and all applies to the cards in order, but the value of each match is affected by the Planewalker and may earn bonus mana or be penalized mana for matching a given color. The matched gems are removed and new gems fall into place, and if further matches are made, these are awarded to the player making the match. An additional bonus swap is given if the player makes a match of five-in-a-row. Before making a match, the player may also activate any Planeswalker skill if they have enough Loyalty points for it. At any time before matching gems, the player can reorder the cards in their hand to be cast in a specific order or, prioritize a card.

After matches and/or activating the Planeswalker ability, if any cards have sufficient mana, they are automatically cast, save for spells that can be held until conditions are met or the player opts to let it be cast. For creatures, the players can only have 3 different creatures on the playfield at any time. The Casting of a new creature will require the player to select one of the existing creatures to remove. Alternately, casting the same type of creature that already is on the playfield will "add" the power and defense of the new creature to the existing one. As with Magic, creatures generally suffer "summoning sickness" and cannot attack the turn they come into play.

Once a player's spells are cast, combat is resolved automatically. Creatures by default will automatically attack the opposing player, damaging that player with their current attack value. Certain effects will alter this attacking behavior. For example, creatures may be "defenders", which will automatically force opponent creatures to attack it before the player. When creatures are attacked, they take damage from their defense value. Unlike Magic, this damage stays permanent until the value drops to zero or below at which point the creature is destroyed. Once the damage is resolved, the opposing player then goes.

Once either the player or opponent's health drops to zero, the match is over. The player is awarded in-game currency, regardless of a win or loss, though the value is much higher for victories. The player can also receive extra rewards for completing matches with specific conditions, such as winning in a small number of rounds. Any damage taken by the Planeswalker character will take some amount of real time to regenerate, such that a player cannot immediately challenge an opponent after a defeat, though the player can use a healing potion, which replenishes over time, to fully heal the character, or can switch to a different Planeswalker to use.

=== Game currency ===
Mana Runes are the standard currency in the game. They are used to level up Planeswalkers. Players are rewarded runes for completing Story and Quick Battle duels. Players can also receive runes by collecting Daily Rewards.

Mana Crystals are the premium in-game currency. They are used to buy new Planeswalkers and Booster Packs. Players are rewarded Mana Crystals for completing secondary objectives in story mode. Players can also receive crystals by collecting Daily Rewards.

Mana Jewels are used to purchase the Elite Pack, which offers a single card. This pack guarantees a Mythic, and has a chance of a Masterpiece card. Every 2 weeks, a new selection of Mythic and Masterpiece cards will be available through the Elite Pack in the Vault.

=== Daily rewards ===
Magic: the Gathering – Puzzle Quest has a daily rewards system that rewards players with game currency or booster packs for logging in each day. The rewards follow a 30-day pattern of progressively greater rewards over a calendar month.
