= WarBreeds =

1998 video game

- Developer: Red Orb Entertainment
- Publishers: Red Orb Entertainment, Broderbund
- Platform: Microsoft Windows
- Release: EU: February 1998; NA: March 23, 1998
- Genre: Real-time strategy
- Modes: Single-player, multiplayer

WarBreeds is a real-time strategy video game developed and published by Red Orb Entertainment and Broderbund. The game is set in a far off galaxy where the humanoid amphibian race called the Yedda have died out due to famine, disease and civil war, leaving their four former servitor races to fight for supremacy for their planet. WarBreeds features the ability to fully customise the warriors with many types of weapons which provide over 35,000 unique combinations. The central theme and mechanic of the game is genetic engineering.

== Gameplay ==
WarBreeds includes skirmishes, a multiplayer mode, and campaigns. WarBreeds has four playable sides, only two of which are playable in campaign mode. As the campaign progresses, another side joins with the player, providing more depth in what they do with their warriors.

WarBreeds provides a different concept on construction of units and buildings as compared with other real time strategy games. WarBreeds allows the player to create many units and structures, but it limits the player on the amount of structures by making them harvest power from spore pods. Although other RTS games use units to gather resources like food, lumber, gold, Vespene gas, Tiberium, etc., resources in WarBreeds are harvested by buildings at a constant rate based on the abundance of resources within a certain radius of those buildings. The player is also limited on how many units they can create.

A major gameplay factor in WarBreeds is the ability to collect DNA from dead enemies, thereby gaining their technologies. Players can gain access to alternate tech trees in some other RTS games, but only Warbreeds makes it a constant, crucial part of gameplay.

== Clans ==
There are four playable clans in Warbreeds, each with their own characteristics. Each race has its own variant of Shaman (the builder/tech class used to plant crops and create structures), and then four units. The game's setting establishes that the Tanu, Kelika, and Sen-Soth were created as servitor races to the Yedda, the first sapient inhabitants of the planet Aeolia; then a group of Yedda religious reactionaries tried to create a prophesied holy warrior—the Magha'Re. The Magha, however, proved to be homicidal and ran the Yedda almost to extinction. The three other races quickly adapted to the Yedda technology, revealing themselves to be far more intelligent than their creators had intended, and became viable competition to the Magha, engaging in a four-way war.

The Tanu campaign mode has the Kelika as eventual allies, and the Magha's campaign has them eventually enslave the Sen-Soth.

=== Tanu ===
The saurian Tanu are all reptilian and have orange as a dominant color. Their units are the fastest movers. Their units are the Scouts (bipedal, swift-moving, fragile units who can mount two weapons), Raptors (a more warlike Scout who can take a head-mounted weapon as well as arm-weapons, as well as having an increase in resilience), Ophidians (large, four-legged creatures who take two shoulder mounts and a head mount; fast speed and moderate armor), and the dirigible Jubjub, which has a natural light laser weapon. The Tanu's indigenous tech includes defensive structures and most melee weapons.

=== Kelika ===
The elephantine or cetacean Kelika are blue with some purple. They tend to be slow, but they can take a beating. Their units are the Thumper (small, fast-moving creature with a natural buzzsaw attack), the Mongrel (gangly bipedal creature), the Behemoth (similar to an Ophidian, but slower and with more armor), and the mighty Leviathan (notable for being one of two units in the game which can take four arm-weapons, their spinning attack, and also for the phenomenal amount of punishment they can endure). The Kelika's indigenous tech includes an eclectic array of structures and armaments, including at the highest level the Summoner structure and the Missile limb-weapon, two of the most powerful weapons in the game.

=== Sen-Soth ===
The insectoid Sen-Soth are colored purple, yellow, and green. Their units tend to be relatively fragile, but are moderately quick, and have very fast development times, allowing them to quickly grow formidable numbers of troops. They include the lightly armed Snipe, the quadrupedal Myrmidon, the giant Dhuganaya (the other unit with four weapon mounts), and the flying Aphid (the only flying unit which allows the player to choose its weapons). The Sen-Soth's indigenous tech includes helpful support structures, perception enhancing Eyestalks, and good ranged weapons.

=== Magha ===
Unlike the other three races, the Magha have no immediate counterpart, apart from looking demonic or devilish. Their units are characterized by red and white, and two of their units have a stealth feature; after being out of combat for a short period of time, the Shadows and Reavers become invisible to the enemies. Their units are the four-legged Shadows, the bladed-armed Dervishes (who attack by spinning their arms like a circular saw), the tall, bipedal Reavers, and the aerial Vipers, who function as bombardiers. The Magha's indigenous tech includes landmines, teleporters, whips, and explosive weapons including the kamikaze.

== Reception ==
Reception

Aggregate score
Aggregator	Score
GameRankings	62%

Review scores
Publication	Score
CNET Gamecenter	4/10
Computer Games Strategy Plus	2/5
Computer Gaming World	3.5/5
GameSpot	6.6/10
GameStar	32%
Hyper	63%
PC Gamer (US)	50%
PC PowerPlay	54%
PC Zone	80%

The game received mixed reviews according to the review aggregation website GameRankings.
