= Warlords (1990 video game) =

1990 video game

- Developer(s): Strategic Studies Group
- Publisher(s): Strategic Studies Group
- Producer(s): Gregor Whiley
- Designer(s): Steve Fawkner
- Programmer(s): Roger Keating; Stephen Hart
- Artist(s): Greame Whittle
- Composer(s): Stephen Hart
- Series: Warlords
- Platform(s): MS-DOS, Amiga, Mac OS
- Release: 1990: Amiga, MS-DOS; 1992: Mac
- Genre(s): Computer wargame
- Mode(s): Single-player, multiplayer

Warlords is a computer wargame released in 1990 for the Amiga and MS-DOS compatible operating systems, then in 1992 for Macintosh. It was designed by Steve Fawkner and developed by Strategic Studies Group. Warlords was followed by three sequels and several spinoffs. The game was based on designer Steve Fawkner's Dungeons & Dragons campaign.

== Gameplay ==
Warlords featured eight different clans battling for the control of the mythical land of Illuria: Sirians, Storm Giants, Grey Dwarves, Orcs of Kor, Elvallie, Horse Lords, Selentines, and Lord Bane. Each clan could either be controlled by the computer or by a human player, allowing up to eight participants taking turns in hot seat play. Gameplay consisted of moving units, attacking opponent units or cities, adjusting production in cities, and moving hero units to explore ruins, temples, libraries, and to discover allies, relics, and other items. The goal of the game was to conquer the land of Illuria by capturing or razing at least two thirds of the cities in the land.

== Reception ==
Warlords reached sales above 50,000 units.

Reviewers cited the basic sound and average graphics of the game, compensated by simple user interface and "high dollar-to-play value". Computer Gaming World favorably cited the sophisticated computer opponents, and concluded that the game "has everything to offer the strategy gamer who has a taste for a bit of the fantasy genre", especially those who enjoyed Empire or Reach for the Stars. The magazine named the game and Command HQ as its 1991 Wargames of the Year. In a 1993 survey of pre 20th-century strategy games the magazine gave the game three stars out of five, stating that it was "eminently playable".

Jim Trunzo reviewed Warlords in White Wolf #29 (Oct./Nov., 1991), rating it a 4 out of 5 and stated that "Warlords takes wargaming into a new genre while retaining the appeal of the original strategic and tactical board games. With eight different empires from which to choose, and numerous strategies capable of being employed, one can easily see that Warlords is a game that will never be the same play twice."

Warlords was named the 67th best computer game ever by PC Gamer UK in 1997. The editors called it "one of the most revolutionary multi-player experiences of the Nineties."
