= Warlords IV: Heroes of Etheria =

2003 video game

- Developer: Infinite Interactive
- Publisher: Ubi Soft
- Producer: Janeen Fawkner
- Designer: Steve Fawkner
- Programmers: Steve Fawkner; Dean Farmer; Mick Robertson; Nick McVeity
- Artist: Janeen Fawkner
- Composer: Steve Fawkner
- Series: Warlords
- Platform: Microsoft Windows
- Release: NA: October 21, 2003; EU: November 28, 2003
- Genre: Turn-based strategy
- Modes: Single player, multiplayer

Warlords IV: Heroes of Etheria is a turn-based strategy video game developed by Infinite Interactive and published by Ubi Soft. It is the fourth in the Warlords series.

== Gameplay ==
This title deviates from prior entries in the series by offering a more streamlined interface and approach to gameplay. Diplomacy plays virtually no role in the game, and micromanagement of units is greatly reduced. Unlike most contemporary games, Warlords IV featured only two resources, gold and mana. Perhaps the most notable streamlining is of the combat system. Rather than having multiple units battling at once, combat is one-on-one, similar to a collectible card game. A player will choose which unit to send into battle, and so will the computer (or the opposing player). The units will then battle to the death, with no retreating. Once a unit is killed, the player or computer sends in another, and so on, until one side is victorious. Surrender is not an option during or between battles. Spells can be cast before or between battles that will help to increase the chance of success. Groups or "stacks" of units can number up to eight for traveling parties or up to sixteen units for cities.

The basic flow of the game consists of producing units in cities, based on the amount of resources currently available to the player, and then sending those units out to conquer other cities and/or explore ruins, while learning spells along the way. Producing a unit, moving a unit to a place on the map, or learning a spell takes a specified number of turns. For example, a weak unit or a common spell may take one or two turns to produce or learn, while a powerful unit may take as much as four turns to produce, and a rare or "arcane" spell may take as much as sixteen turns to learn. While the player is performing these steps, the opposing players are as well. As many as eight players can play a game at a time. These can be any mixture of human or AI players. The game ends once all but one warlord (player) is defeated. The objective of the game is to capture enemy cities, which will result in more resources and units. Cities come in four levels and can be upgraded at the cost of gold. A higher-level city can produce more powerful units and is more resistant to enemy sieges. The player can also explore different ruins which dot the map, which can yield great numbers of experience points, magical items which can be used by hero units (discussed below), additional resources, or additional combat units. Depending on the surrounding buildings a player's capital city has, quests may become available which consist of the player clearing out four random ruins on the map as steps towards a great reward. These can help increase the power of a player's army.

=== Races and units ===
There are ten different races in the game: Knights, Empire, Elves, Dark Elves, Dwarves, Dragons, Undead, Demons, Orcs and Ogres. Each of these races has six types of units, each of which has a counterpart with the other races. These unit categories could be classed as: Infantry, Archer, Cavalry, Siege, Creature, and Hero, in order of how many turns it takes to produce them. Infantry are typically the cheap, weak units. Archer units can fire projectiles, and are best used as backup for other units, as they can still fire arrows as support even when they are not the active units. Cavalry units are mounted riders who have a good range of movement out of battle, and are more powerful than infantry in battle. Siege units are most useful when attacking a city; they can stay in the "back row" (i.e. not active units) and fire projectiles at a city's walls in order to destroy them and prevent them from firing arrows at the active unit. Creature units are generally large and/or powerful fantasy creatures which are more powerful than cavalry units; they are also often flying units, which have the best range of movement on the map. Hero units are powerful units which can make use of magic items found in ruins to increase their skills. They also have a special "leadership" ability which can increase the power of other units. These categories are loose, however. While all units correspond to each other, some races have units in these slots which deviate from these categories. Units can gain experience points, and thus can gain levels, making them more powerful and allowing them to increase their special abilities. However, even a very powerful unit can be defeated by weaker units.

Each of the units has the characteristics of its race. For example, the nature-oriented elves have treants, unicorns, and elven warriors as units, while the undead have skeletons and liches as units. The races also have distinct architectural styles in the looks of their cities. Each race has a strength or weakness compared with another race. This means that certain races while facing other races will have an advantage. Each character (warlord) a player makes has to have a certain "favored" race, which means that the character will produce only that race's units in his/her cities. If a player conquers the city of another race, he or she can produce those types of units, but depending on how opposite that race is from his or her favored race, it will take longer or shorter than it would for his or her own units.

=== Warlords ===
The player's character is called a warlord. The player chooses one of 33 portraits to represent the warlord during its creation. The player must also choose two types of specialization for the warlord. For example, picking "combat" and "combat" will result in a non-magic-using warrior. Picking "combat" and "nature magic" will result in a ranger, and so on. The warlord can only enter direct battle when its capital city is under siege. Naturally, it is the most powerful type of unit in the game. In a normal game, when a warlord is defeated, all its cities become neutral and up for grabs, and it leaves the game with generally a few experience points. These can be used to advance levels for the warlord, and allow the player to either add on a building (from a finite number of types) which gives some benefit to future campaigns. For example, adding a certain type of building might increase the amount of gold (necessary to produce new units) a player earns per city. Instead of add a building, the player may choose to increase one of four skills for the warlord. Warlords are persistent characters which can be used in an infinite number of campaigns.

== Development ==
Warlords IV uses pre-rendered 3D sprites for its unit and city graphics. It also uses particle graphics for various effects. The game was originally scheduled to be released in September 2001.

=== Map editor ===
Warlords IV contains a map editor which allows users to design their own world maps to play on. Various types of terrain features are available, and the interface is user-friendly. Four sizes of maps are available (50X50, 75X75, 100X100, 125X125) based on the number of squares on the map's grid. Up to 50 cities, 100 sites (surrounding buildings which can produce resources and other effects), and 50 ruins can be placed on the map. The cities and ruins are given randomly-generated names, but the player can enter a custom name or keep randomly generating names as many times as desired. The designer of the map also determines the level, capital status, garrison, and income of the cities. He or she also determines the number of players that can play the map at one time, and the race restrictions, if any.

== Reception ==
Warlords IV received a lackluster reception. GameRankings, for example, shows an aggregate review score for the game of 70%, about ten percentage points lower than both Warlords III games.

One of the reasons this version was not as popular was due to the poor quality AI. The game was easily beaten on any difficulty when playing against computer players. The 1.04 patch fixed many of the AI issues, rebalanced the races, and fixed issues in the original version. This patch was released at the beginning of 2006 long after the original game's release, which may have affected its ability to revitalize interest in the game.

According to Steve Fawkner, this game was built from scratch in six months by Infinite Interactive after being handed it by SSG in an incomplete form, and is why the game is not up to previous standards. To date it remains the least popular game of the series.
