= Warlords Battlecry III =

2004 video game

- Developer: Infinite Interactive
- Publisher: Enlight Software
- Producer: Janeen Fawkner
- Designer: Steve Fawkner
- Programmers: Steve Fawkner; Dean Farmer; Mick Robertson; Nick McVeity
- Artists: Janeen Fawkner; Lee Smith
- Composers: Steve Fawkner; Marc Derell
- Series: Warlords
- Platform: Microsoft Windows
- Release: NA: May 19, 2004; EU: June 25, 2004
- Genre: Real-time strategy
- Modes: Single-player, multiplayer

Warlords Battlecry III is a real-time strategy game developed by Infinite Interactive and published in 2004. It is the third installment in the Warlords Battlecry series and the sequel to Warlords Battlecry II.

== Gameplay ==
While Warlords Battlecry III is primarily a real-time strategy game, it has some elements of role-playing video game in that players can complete optional quests, as well as create a customized Hero character that can level up from battle to battle and equip unique and powerful items.

The Campaign is a mixture of an overhead strategic map with real-time gameplay. Departing from the system used in Warlords Battlecry II, which consisted of a Risk-style board with territories, Warlords Battlecry III divides the world of Etheria into numerous locations (mostly cities) that players travel between, with various events at each. Almost all of the map locations have missions to play, some of which are not readily visible until other missions have been completed, as well as shops, academies, and/or mercenaries for hire. Once a player enters a mission, the game switches to real-time strategy gameplay reminiscent of games such as Warcraft and Age of Empires. Players use four resources, Gold, Metal, Crystal and Stone, which are used to produce a variety of structures and units. Unlike many other RTS games, resources are present as neutral buildings which can be captured and destroyed (not permanently) and generate resources automatically without player input. Although magic and spells come into play, games are usually decided by the player who has a combination of an overwhelming number of superior units and better micromanaging of his Hero character. The Hero typically becomes extremely powerful by the late game and can slay dozens of normal units alone.

Warlords Battlecry III is unique in its replay ability due to the diplomacy system and the number of races in the game. Depending on which missions have been completed and what was their original race selection, players can be Enemies, Neutral, Friendly, or Allied (which makes that race playable) with each of the 16 races. Preprogrammed biases explained in the backstory mean that it is more difficult for a player to be allied with two warring races, such as Dwarves and Plaguelords, but it is possible.

== Features ==
Warlords Battlecry III has more factions and hero types than the earlier games in the series, with 16 different races and 28 varying character classes. Heroes have groups of loyal soldiers called retinues, which will follow and fight for them in battle, and the level cap for units was increased to 20 in this game, up from 7. The human faction was split in this game into two new races: the Empire and the Knights, and the new races of Swarm, Plaguelord, and Ssrathi were introduced. Each old race received at least one new unit, sometimes several. New magic spells were added, including the all-new Arcane, Poison, and Divination schools. Several new hero classes were added, as well as a brand-new campaign engine and a completely new hero level-up method that includes the ability to level up in the middle of a battle (players were previously restricted to leveling up after battles only).

== Plot ==
Warlords Battlecry III follows the player hero as they journey around Etheria. Their story begins as a crew officer of a Selentine ship bound for Keshan.

The Selentine Merchants ventured across the South Seas and discovered Keshan, a continent inhabited by the snake-like Ssrathi. They began to plunder the silver and gold from these lands and slaughter the Ssrathi and were soon joined by various adventurers and profiteers. The crew of one of the Selentine vessels approaching Keshan spotted an unnatural storm over Mordanion, the Sundered Isle. The player hero takes a small force to investigate the cause of the storm. They soon discover the high elven guardians either dead or dying, with a huge portal hanging in the air as if something powerful has recently entered the world of Erathia. They also find the body of a Ssrathi who lay at the base of the portal.

The player and the crew venture forth to Keshan and after joining several battles between the Ssrathi and Selentines, they manage to receive an audience from the Seers of Kalpaxotl. They reveal that following the continued exploitation by the Selentines, one of seers traveled to Mordanion to seek help against them. After the high elven guardians of the isle refused to grant aid, the seer opened a rift, releasing a powerful demon on the other side. The demon killed the guardians and the seer before fleeing far to the northwest to The Wastes.

The player then participates in various quests and battles around the world of Erathia in order to bolster his/her power and crew. Upon arriving in the Wastes, the player approaches a fortress, the residing place of the demon from the rift, now revealed to be Gorgon, the fifth Horseman and the Lord of Destruction. The player then seeks aid from the Dark Dwarves of Khazdul in hopes of finding a way to stop Gorgon. After fighting them for an audience, the player meets up with the Siegemaster of Khazdul, Runelord Brax. Brax tells how Gorgon can not be destroyed, but came up with a plan to trap the horseman in the fortress.

Following the plan, the player visits the Realms of Death, Famine, and Pestilence to aid Lords Bane, Melkor, and Anthrag against the servants of Gorgon. As the player defeats them, they recover a key from each of the three commanders of the invasions. The player returns to the Wastes to lay siege to Gorgon's fortress and after holding off a counterattack from its minions, the keys are used to seal the horseman within the fortress. Brax arrives shortly afterwards and casts an arcane earthquake spell to seal Gorgon and the fortress under the Wastes forever. With Gorgon finally stopped, Brax warns against setting foot in the Wastes again, claiming that the echoes of Gorgon's final scream can drive a man insane.

== Development ==
In August 2003, Enlight Software obtained the worldwide publishing rights to the game. The game went gold on May 10, 2004.

== Reception ==
Warlords Battlecry III
Reviews

Aggregate scores
Aggregator	Score
GameRankings	73%
Metacritic	73/100

Review scores
Publication	Score
Game Informer	7.75/10
GameSpot	7.2/10
GameSpy	3/5
GameZone	8/10
IGN	8/10
PC Format	70%

Warlords Battlecry III received "mixed or average reviews" according to review aggregate Metacritic.
