= Adrift (video game) =

2016 video game

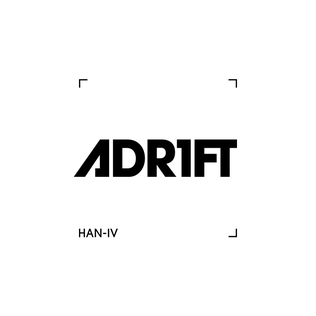
- Developer: Three One Zero
- Publisher: 505 Games
- Directors: Adam Orth; Omar Aziz
- Producer: Matteo Marsala
- Designers: Tom Gerber; Sam Bass
- Artist: Jason Barajas
- Writer: Adam Orth
- Composers: Adam Orth; Weezer
- Engine: Unreal Engine 4
- Platforms: Microsoft Windows; PlayStation 4
- Release: Microsoft Windows; March 28, 2016; PlayStation 4 July 15, 2016
- Genre: Adventure
- Mode: Single-player

Adrift (stylized as Adr1ft) is a first-person adventure video game developed by Three One Zero and published by 505 Games. It was released on March 28, 2016 for Microsoft Windows and July 15, 2016 for PlayStation 4. An Xbox One version of the game was planned but has been cancelled. The story follows an astronaut, who floats through the wreckage of a destroyed space station with no memory of the incident. Over the course of the game, players find clues that piece together the events of the incident, and attempt to repair the escape vehicle to return home.

Development began in 2013, following creator Adam Orth's resignation from Microsoft. The development team envision the game as a "first-person experience", purposefully avoiding violence. Orth compares the game to the upheaval in his life following his controversial comments about the Xbox One's DRM proposal.

== Gameplay ==
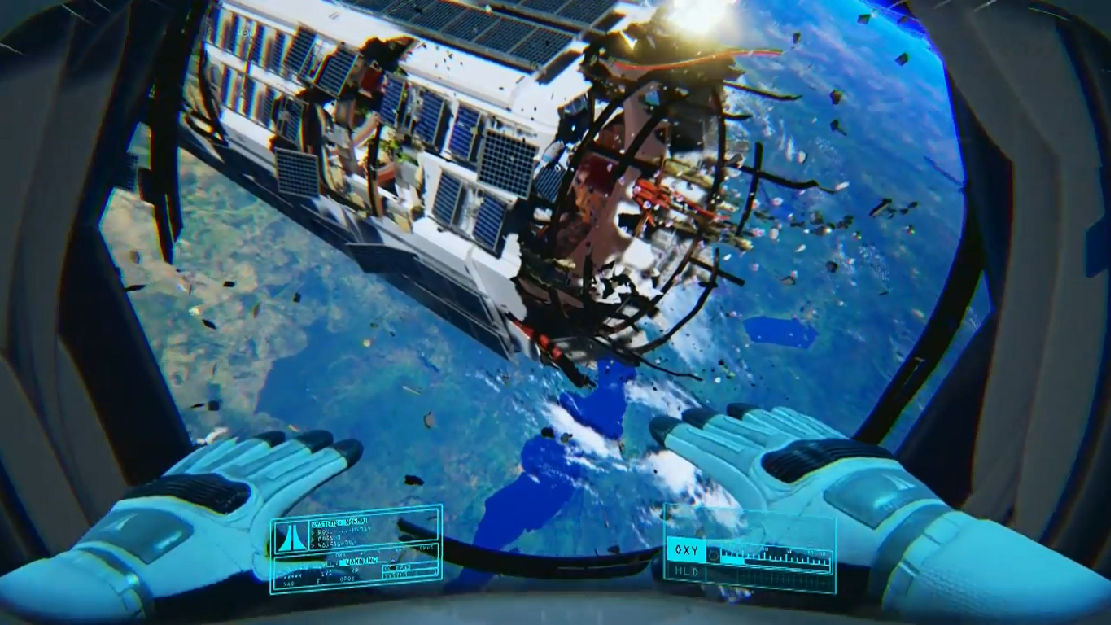
Players float around the destroyed space station in zero gravity, maintaining sufficient oxygen levels by collecting oxygen tanks.

Adrift is played from a first-person view. In the game, players take control of Commander Alex Oshima, floating and moving in any direction through the open environment, which takes place in zero gravity. The environment may be fully explored, but players will be restrained from exploring too far. One of the restraints is an oxygen limit, which players must monitor to avoid suffocation. When running low on oxygen, players' vision becomes blurred; they must obtain an oxygen tank to stay alive. Players move throughout five areas, completing a series of puzzles. Players are able to locate audio logs that will expand on the events of the incident; the game is set in the year 2037. Players will also find artifacts from the dead crew and must decide whether to return them to Earth. The game is said to have two main objectives: to survive, and to return home safely.

== Development ==
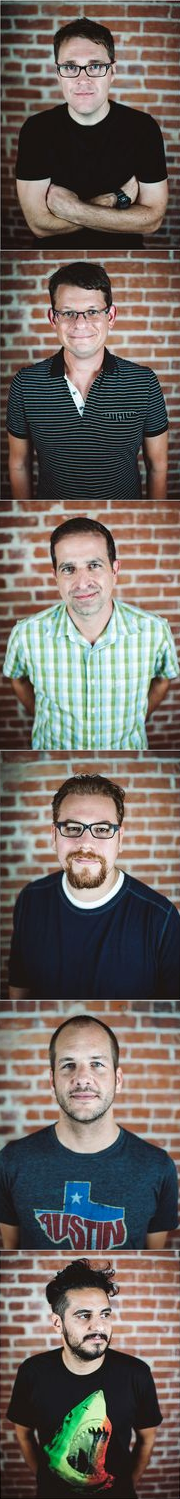
The core development team of Adrift. From top to bottom: Adam Orth, Sam Bass, Matteo Marsala, Jason Barajas, Tom Gerber, and Omar Aziz.

The conception of Adrift was a direct result from the events that occurred to Adam Orth in 2013. When Microsoft's Xbox One was announced, it received controversy for its digital rights management that would require users to remain online to use the console. After seeing people quarrel over this, Orth—then a creative director at Microsoft—told them to "deal with it", which resulted in a mass of complaints leading to Orth's resignation from the company. This led him to move from Seattle to Southern California. Orth noted that the game is a metaphor, comparing it to the events in his life; both Orth and the player character find themselves in the middle of a disaster, and must "do the hard work to put things together". He has stated that the game is about "action, consequence and redemption". Orth wrote the story without any science fiction or supernatural themes in mind, stating that he "wanted to make stories and characters that hopefully resonate with people because they're not typical video game stories".

Following his resignation from Microsoft, Orth approached his former colleague Omar Aziz with the idea of founding a new studio. Although initially hesitant, Aziz agreed with the idea after hearing Orth's pitch for Adrift, and the two founded the development studio Three One Zero. After building a prototype for the game, Orth contacted and hired other former colleagues. The development team found that they were interested in developing Adrift due to its unique nature, setting it apart from first-person shooters. "I've gotten a lot of FPS fatigue over the years, having worked on them for many, many years I've gotten tired of them," said producer Matteo Marsala. The team envision the game as a "first-person experience", making an intentional diversion from violence. The game's development ultimately lasted approximately 13 months, with a core team of six developers. Throughout development, the team hired various contractors for a number of weeks in order to complete certain tasks, such as animation.

The team noted that the "look" of the game was the biggest change that occurred during development. Orth compared the game's art style to the minimalist presentation of the 1968 film 2001: A Space Odyssey. Orth also acknowledged the comparisons between Adrift and the 2013 film Gravity, stating that the game was conceived prior to the film's release. Upon watching the film, he felt confident that the two are "very different". The team consider the game's scope and scale to be similar to Gravity, the immersion of the world similar to the Half-Life series, and the presentation and storytelling similar to Journey (2012). Orth also admitted that he was largely inspired by the game Proteus (2013) while developing Adrift. The game's logo was designed by graphic designer Cory Schmitz, while the team hired Hogarth de la Plante as a prototype artist, Dave Flamburis as a technical artist, Oscar Cafaro as a concept artist and Chad King as an environment artist. The game's soundtrack was mainly composed by Orth, with contributions from the American band Weezer. The game's sounds were recorded by Al Nelson of Skywalker Sound, at Skywalker Ranch. Nelson stated that he intended to "[tell] a story and [present] emotion with sound".

The game was developed simultaneously for Microsoft Windows, PlayStation 4 and Xbox One. It was released on March 28, 2016 for Windows, and is scheduled to release on July 15, 2016 for PlayStation 4. it was originally intended for release in September 2015, but was delayed to coincide with the launch of the Oculus Rift. The game will feature Oculus Rift support, a feature that they intended since's the game's conception. The original prototype for the game was developed for potential publishers by three people in ten weeks, using the Unity game engine. The game's functionality was rebuilt for use with the Unreal Engine 4.

Adrift was officially announced on June 4, 2014, prior to the full gameplay reveal at The Game Awards on December 5, 2014. A trailer for the game leaked a few days prior to E3 2015, in June 2015. On June 12, 2015, Three One Zero announced a partnership with Top Cow Productions and Image Comics to produce a comic book series based on Adrift; the first issue was released on the same day. The series is written by Matt Hawkins, with artwork by Luca Casalanguida.

== Reception ==
The game received generally mixed reviews upon release according to review aggregator platform Metacritic.
