= Puzzle Quest 2 =

2010 video game

- Developer: Infinite Interactive
- Publishers: NA: D3 Publisher; EU: Namco Bandai Games; iOS/Android/Windows Phone; Namco Bandai Games
- Platforms: Nintendo DS, Xbox 360 (XBLA), iOS, Windows Phone, Windows, Android
- Release: DS: NA: June 22, 2010; EU: July 16, 2010; Xbox Live Arcade: NA: June 30, 2010; Windows: NA: August 12, 2010; iOS: NA: December 2, 2010; WW: December 9, 2010; Android: WW: October 26, 2010
- Genre: Puzzle RPG
- Modes: Single-player, Multiplayer

Puzzle Quest 2 is a video game developed by Infinite Interactive for the Nintendo DS, Xbox Live Arcade, iOS, Android, Windows Phone 7, and Microsoft Windows. It was released on June 22, 2010, by D3 Publisher. A version for the PlayStation Portable was in development, but was cancelled due to sound bugs. It is the sequel to Puzzle Quest: Challenge of the Warlords, and like its predecessor, it combines role-playing with strategy and puzzle elements. It uses a competitive, Bejeweled-style, "match three game" playfield to simulate combat and other activities common to role-playing games.

== Gameplay ==
=== Attributes ===
Each character has five basic attributes. Strength (Red) increases the chance of a Critical hit from a weapon and the amount of bonus damage that matching Skulls does. Agility (Yellow) increases the chance of blocking an attack and the number of bonus points gained from matching action gems. Intelligence (Blue) increases the number of extra moves that character has when playing mini-games and the maximum amount of mana a character can store. Stamina (Green) increases the chance of Critical Blocking and the number of life points a player has. And Morale (Purple) increases the chance to resist an opponent's spell and the amount of damage a weapon does. Different types of characters can earn attributes faster than others. Increasing an attribute will increase that color's utilization in combat. For example, increasing Strength increases the amount of Red mana a player can hold, start with, and collect.

=== Classes ===
There are four character classes to choose from at the start of the game. Barbarians grow in Stamina and Strength and are considered to be an "all-around" class. Barbarians can use extreme 2 handed weapons. Sorcerers grow in Intelligence and Morale, they use spells for all situations, and they can use "Mana Tonics" that allow the user to get Extra mana for a match. Assassins grow in Agility and Morale, they start the game with low attack but have severe spells that can cause lethal damage combos, and they can utilize severe poisons. Templars grow in Morale and Stamina, have high levels of defense and life points, and can use extreme armor and shields.

=== Combat ===
Gameplay is similar to that of Challenge of the Warlords. Each player takes turns trying to match at least a set of three gems to gain mana or action points or to do damage to the enemy. If the player has enough mana, they can use a spell instead, or if they have enough action points, they can use an item that can consist of a weapon (which damages the enemy), a shield (which increases defense for a limited time), or a potion (which adds an amount to a mana reserve or number of life points). The tiles have changed from the last game. There are Red, Yellow, Blue, Green, and Purple gems, which when collected add a certain amount to that specific mana reserve. When skulls are matched, they damage the enemy based on the number of skulls matched and what that player's skull damage bonus is. When the action gems are matched (which look like gauntlets), they are added toward that player's action reserve so that player can use specific items. Wildcards can appear with a multiplier like the last game. Gold and Experience are obtained after battle along with loot items. Certain mini-games have different sorts of tiles. Matching a set of four gives the player an additional move, while a set of five also generates a wildcard. Illegal moves are no longer penalized. If there are no moves available on the board, all the mana reserves of each player are lost, and the board is reset.

== Reception ==
Puzzle Quest 2 received generally positive reviews, garnering a Metacritic score of 81% for the Xbox 360 release and 74% for the Nintendo DS release. IGN's review praised the game's combination of casual puzzle gameplay with added layers of depth and extensive single- and multiplayer modes. In his review for Eurogamer, Christian Donlan called the game's puzzle mechanics "flavourless" and its fantasy setting "bland," but stated that the game remains "frighteningly talented when it comes to targeting your compulsions." Giant Bomb's Brad Shoemaker identified the game as a return to form for Infinite Interactive after what he identified as missteps in Puzzle Quest: Galactrix and Neopets Puzzle Adventure. The PC version received positive reviews from GameSpot, which praised the addictive gameplay and from 1UP, whose review states that the game "improves on the original in almost every way."
