= Gems of War =

2015 video game

Gems of War is a free-to-play tile-matching video game released by Infinity Plus Two. It was released on Xbox One and PlayStation 4 in 2015. It is a spin-off game from the Puzzle Quest series.
