= Infinity Plus Two =

Video Game developer

- Former logo as Infinite Interactive
- Type: Subsidiary
- Industry: Interactive entertainment
- Founded: 1989
- Headquarters: St Kilda, Victoria, Australia
- Key people: Steve Fawkner, CEO
- Products: Warlords series Puzzle Quest series
- Parent: 505 Games
- Website: infinite-interactive.com

Infinity Plus Two, previously Infinite Interactive, is a video game developer with headquarters in St Kilda, Victoria, Australia.

== History ==
The company was founded by Steve Fawkner in 1989. After a long alliance with SSG, resulting in the development of the Warlords series of games, Steve moved on to make Infinite totally independent in 2003. Infinite Interactive was one of the first developers to port a full custom game engine to the iPhone in 2009. However due to Publisher issues it was not until much later that any properties were released on the iOS platform. In 2011, the company was acquired by fellow Australian developers Firemint, creators of Flight Control and Real Racing - however, in late 2012 Infinite Interactive announced their return as an independent developer.

Infinite has continued to produce Warlords games (Warlords IV: Heroes of Etheria and Warlords Battlecry III), but has recently branched out into the more casual marketplace. They have also released Puzzle Quest for the PlayStation Portable, Nintendo DS, IPhone, PS3, Xbox 360 and PC. Galactrix, another match-3-based puzzle game in the Puzzle Quest series, this time with a science fiction setting and hexagonal tiles. May 2009 saw the release of Puzzle Kingdoms, a turn-based strategy iteration of the successful Puzzle Quest franchise. In September 2012, it was announced that a new game, "heavily inspired by our previous hit game, Puzzle Quest", was in development with a projected release of 2013. The game in question, Gems of War, a free-to-play roleplaying puzzle game similar to their previous titles, was launched on November 19, 2014.

In 2019 the company rebranded itself as Infinity Plus Two. The company was acquired by 505 Games in January 2021.

== Games ==
- Warlords IV: Heroes of Etheria
- Warlords Battlecry III
- Puzzle Quest (series)
  - Puzzle Quest: Challenge of the Warlords
  - Puzzle Quest 2
  - Puzzle Quest 3
  - Puzzle Quest: Galactrix
  - Gems of War
- Neopets Puzzle Adventure
- Puzzle Kingdoms
- Puzzle Chronicles
- Tiny Quest
