= Neopets Puzzle Adventure =

2008 video game

- Developers: Griptonite Games (DS), Infinite Interactive (Wii/PC)
- Publisher: Capcom
- Platforms: Nintendo DS, Wii, Microsoft Windows (WiiWare)
- Release: NA: November 25, 2008; EU: May 22, 2009
- Genre: Puzzle
- Modes: Single-player, multiplayer

Neopets Puzzle Adventure is a Neopets video game. Published by Capcom, the Nintendo DS version of the game was developed by Griptonite Games and the other two platforms (Wii and PC) were developed by Infinite Interactive. It could best be described as a pseudo-sequel to the game Puzzle Quest: Challenge of the Warlords (also developed by Infinite Interactive), although to battle enemy characters, players now play a game resembling Reversi as opposed to one resembling Bejeweled. As the title implies, the game features a Neopets license and players with a Neopets account may enter codes unlocked in the game online for "virtual prizes." Players will be able to choose between 12 Neopets to play as, while petpets will provide powerups for the matches.
