= Red Orb Entertainment =

Video game publishing company

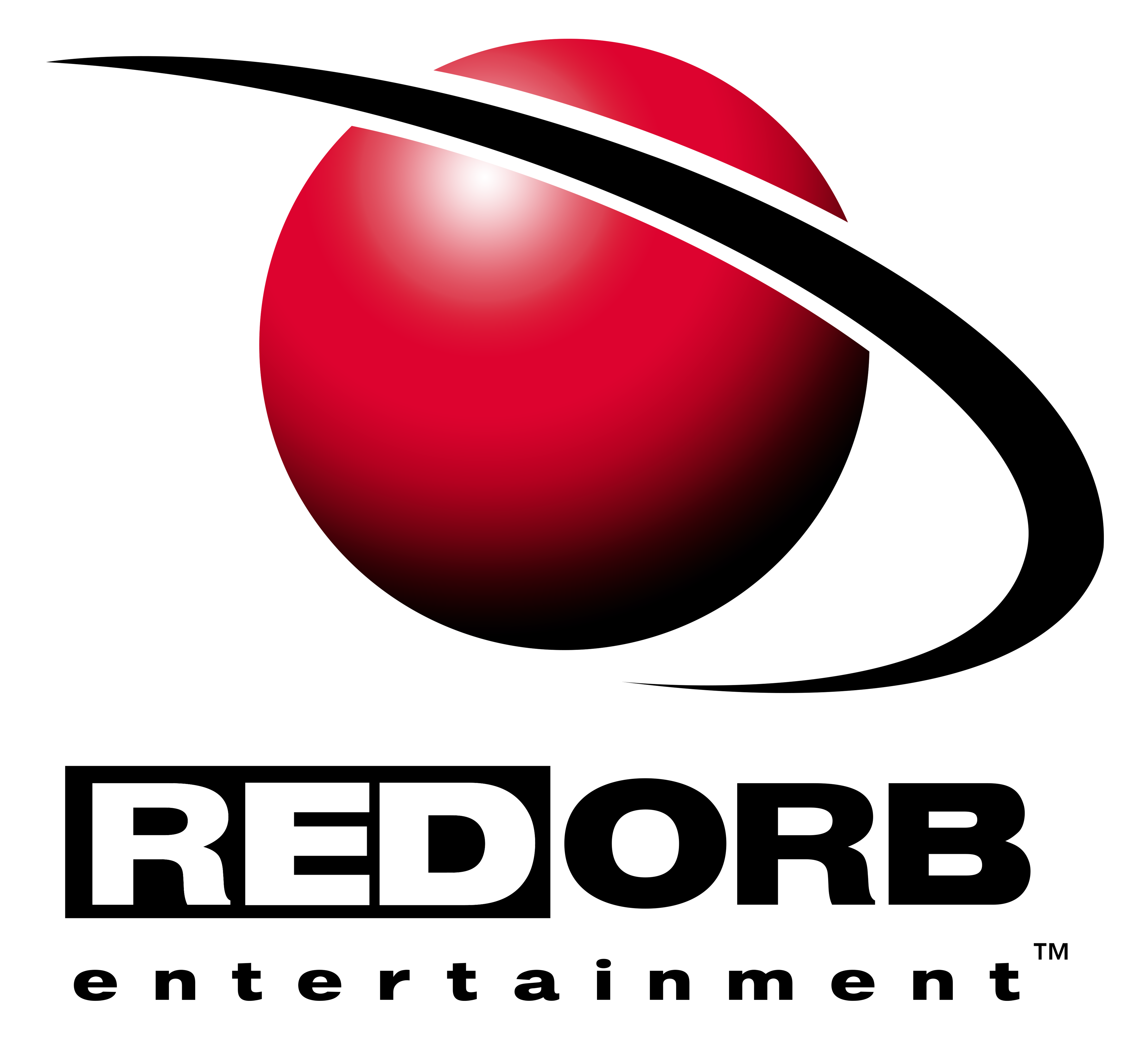
- Company type: Subsidiary
- Industry: Video games
- Founded: May 21, 1997; 29 years ago
- Defunct: March 2001
- Headquarters: Novato, California, U.S. Hartlepool, England, UK
- Key people: Ken F. Goldstein (VP & general manager); Ted Simon (group marketing manager)
- Products: Prince of Persia 3D, Riven, Warlords III
- Parent: Broderbund (1997–1998); The Learning Company (1998–2001)
- Website: redorb.com (archived)

Red Orb Entertainment was a publishing division created by the Broderbund software company to market its video game titles, distinguishing them from its library of edutainment titles, which it marketed to schools. Launched on May 21, 1997, and based in Novato, California, the name comes from the first six letters of "Broderbund," which spell "Red Orb" when reversed.

After its parent company Broderbund was acquired by The Learning Company in 1998, Red Orb's brand continued to be used and was supported by the latter's Mindscape division. After TLC's parent company Mattel Interactive was sold off in 2000, Subsequent games of the Myst, Prince of Persia, and Warlords franchises were later published by Ubisoft, who acquired all of Mattel Interactive's entertainment library in March 2001.

== Titles ==
Red Orb Entertainment developed and/or published several games in the late 1990s. These include:

- John Saul's Blackstone Chronicles
- The Journeyman Project 3: Legacy of Time
- The Journeyman Project Trilogy
- Myst: Masterpiece Edition
- Prince of Persia 3D
- Ring: The Legend of the Nibelungen
- Riven: The Sequel to Myst
- Soul Fighter
- Take No Prisoners
- WarBreeds
- Warlords III: Darklords Rising
- Warlords III: Reign of Heroes
