= Puzzle Quest: Challenge of the Warlords =

2007 video game

- PlayStation Portable European cover art
- Developers: Infinite Interactive; 1st Playable Productions (DS); Infinity Plus 2 (Switch, Immortal)
- Publishers: D3 Publisher; D3 Go! (Switch)
- Designer: Steve Fawkner
- Series: Warlords
- Engine: Vicious Engine; Unity (The Legend Returns)
- Platforms: Nintendo DS; PlayStation Portable; Windows; Xbox 360; PlayStation 2; Wii; Mac OS X; PlayStation 3; iOS; Mobile; Switch; PlayStation 4; PlayStation 5; Xbox One; Xbox Series X/S
- Release: 16 March 2007: Nintendo DS & PlayStation Portable; EU: 16 March 2007; NA: 20 March 2007; JP: 27 September 2007 (PSP); JP: 29 November 2007 (DS); Windows; 10 October 2007; Xbox Live Arcade; NA: 10 October 2007; EU: 10 October 2007; PlayStation 2; NA: 13 November 2007; EU: 30 November 2007; AU: 27 March 2008; Wii; NA: 30 November 2007; EU: 8 February 2008; AU: 27 March 2008; PlayStation 3; NA: 9 October 2008; EU: 11 December 2008; iOS; NA: 23 December 2008; Mobile; 2008; Switch (The Legend Returns); 19 September 2019; PlayStation 4, PlayStation 5, Xbox One, Xbox Series X/S (Immortal Edition); 18 September 2025
- Genres: Tile-matching, role-playing
- Modes: Single-player, multiplayer

Puzzle Quest: Challenge of the Warlords is a 2007 puzzle video game developed by Infinite Interactive and published by D3 Publisher. The game combines role-playing with tile-matching elements. Taking place in a high fantasy setting, the player moves their character around the game's world and encounters monsters and other enemies to fight so as to gain experience and acquire treasure as in a typical role-playing game. Combat takes place on a board similar to Bejeweled, and by making matches of coloured gems, the combatants can cause damage to their opponents, cast spells, or perform other abilities that affect the flow of the game.

The game was first released on the Nintendo DS and PlayStation Portable in 2007, and has since been ported to Microsoft Windows, OS X, Xbox 360, PlayStation 2, PlayStation 3, Wii, iOS, and Nintendo Switch. Among these ports included extended content: "Revenge of the Plague Lord" which was included in the Xbox 360, PlayStation 3, and iOS releases, and "Attack of the Golem Lord", which is available alongside the "Revenge" content for the Switch version, under the name Puzzle Quest: The Legend Returns. A remastered version, Puzzle Quest: Immortal Edition, was released in September 2025 for the Nintendo Switch, PlayStation 4, PlayStation 5, Windows, Xbox One, and Xbox Series X/S.

Puzzle Quest was a surprise hit at release and received generally positive reviews for the fusion of the two distinct video game genres. Since its release, Puzzle Quest has received a direct sequel, Puzzle Quest 2, and a science-fiction variant, Puzzle Quest: Galactrix. The basic gameplay has also been used as a template for licensed games in the series, Marvel Puzzle Quest and Magic: The Gathering – Puzzle Quest.

== Gameplay ==
The story of Puzzle Quest is based in the Warlords game universe. Players assume the role of a character with various statistics such as combat ability, morale, and magical affinity. A character's predisposition toward individual attributes and spells is determined by the selection of one of four professions at the start of the game. During play, the player takes on quests as part of the main storyline, as well as accepting side quests in order to gain items, experience and gold. Gold can be used to buy equipment that offers bonuses in combat, or it can be used to build up a citadel that unlocks additional content and customization for the character.

The game uses a simple map, and as players accept quests, new towns, cities, and other points of interest appear as available destinations. Each location is connected together by roads, and foes periodically appear between locations, blocking movement until they are defeated. Key quest locations are also marked on the map, and completing quests typically involves visiting such locations in order to defeat one or more opponents in one-on-one battles.

=== Combat ===
The combat screen in Puzzle Quest with the player (left) facing against a computer opponent (right). Image is from the Xbox Live Arcade version of the game.

Combat in the title is conducted entirely via turn-based puzzle action similar to Bejeweled or Zoo Keeper. The player and the computer-controlled opponent take turns swapping the position of two horizontally or vertically adjacent tiles on a grid to make a row or column of at least 3 like tiles; these tiles are removed with various effects as listed below, and all tiles above them fall to fill in the spaces, with new tiles created at the top of the board. If, by this action, a new row or column of three or more like tiles is formed, this is also removed and the chain can continue indefinitely. An extremely long chain can earn the player additional bonuses. If either combatant can match four or more tiles in a line, that combatant will be given an extra turn and potentially additional bonuses. If no move to make a match of 3 is available, the board is reset for both combatants.

Tiles themselves correspond to certain effects when matched. Coloured titles provide that colour of mana for the combatant's spells and abilities, while skull tiles do direct damage to the opponent. Other tiles represent experience and gold for the player when matched. Additionally, wildcards can be matched with any of these tiles. The player-character's class, experience level, and equipment affect how much bonus mana or damage he or she gets for matching those tiles. Prior to a match, a combatant can cast a spell which he or she has enough mana for. Spells can do direct damage or may affect the board, such as removing all tiles of a specific type; once used, a spell has a cooldown period of a few turns before it can be used again. Combatants may have armour points, either from their equipment or gained through spells, which absorb damage before the combatant's hit points are reduced. Once either the player or computer opponent runs out of life, the battle is over. Most battles can be re-fought if the player loses, although only those which are part of the main quest need be completed in order to advance the game plot.

Following successful battle, the player is rewarded with experience points and gold. By raising the character's experience level, the player can distribute skill points to affect how the tile-matching combat plays out. Gold can be used to purchase equipment and spells at the in-game shops. The player can gain Companions during the game. Companions, like equipment, provide certain bonuses in combat, and also affect the storyline of the game. Between battles, a player can visit his or her citadel, a certain base which he or she can build up using gold and other treasures. This provides a forge to construct new equipment, a bestiary where the player can try to learn spells from captured opponents, and train mounts. Most of these activities require completing a mini-game variant of the tile-matching game.

=== Version differences ===
The PSP version has a much more challenging artificial intelligence along with a larger screen and more in-game effects.

The game's Xbox Live Arcade version uses the service's built-in networking to allow players to compete online, similar to the player matches available in the DS and PSP versions.

== Development ==
Puzzle Quest was primarily the brainchild of Steve Fawkner, the original designer of the Warlords game series which merged typical RPG elements with turn-based strategy games. The series was successful enough for Fawkner to form Infinite Interactive, which were the primary developers of the first three titles for the series, and did some of the work on the fourth title in 2004 before full development was taken over by Strategic Studies Group (SSG), the publisher for the first three games, due to declining budgets for video games at that time. Fawkner opted to reduce his staffing to three people and use the time to refine their game engines, not releasing any games through 2007.

During this time, Fawkner became hooked on Bejeweled, often playing the game into the late hours of the night. He realized that he could wrap the core match-3 concept into a game with Magic: The Gathering elements and create a story mode in the vein of Final Fantasy Tactics, forming the basis for Puzzle Quest. Fawkner found difficulty in finding a publisher for the title, as they did not have an idea of how many units the game would sell and thus could not estimate a budget for the title. Fawkner eventually was able to gain D3 Publisher that dealt primarily in low-volume Japanese titles, though there still had difficulties with estimating budgets.

The first release of the game in North America consisted of 40,000 units of the Nintendo DS version; according to Fawkner these sold out within a week of shipment, in part due to the game's mention and difficulty to acquire by the popular webcomic Penny Arcade. D3 raced to publish more to meet demand, though at the time were limited by Nintendo's ability to provide black DS cartridges. With the success of the game, Fawkner was able to expand Infinite Interactive to eventually 70 employees to work on the various ports of Puzzle Quest and subsequent sequels.

== Expansions and rereleases ==
An expansion for the game, Revenge of the Plague Lord, was released on 23 July, 2008 for the Xbox Live Arcade and was included in the 9 October 2008 release on the PlayStation Network. It was also released as a free update for the iPhone OS version. The expansion features 4 new character classes (Bard, Rogue, Ranger and Warlock), and an expansive new area on the Southern Map containing more than 25 challenging quests, 50 new spells, 40 new magical items and new monsters to combat, as part of the story of Antharg, the Lord of Plague and brother to Lord Bane.

The 2019 Nintendo Switch version, named Puzzle Quest: The Legend Returns, adds an additional quest line Attack of the Golem Lord atop the existing content.

A remastered version, Puzzle Quest: Immortal Edition, was released on September 18, 2025, for the Nintendo Switch, PlayStation 4, PlayStation 5, Windows, Xbox One, and Xbox Series X/S. This version is being developed by Infinity Plus 2, the rebrand of Infinity Interactive. Besides improvement in graphics and support for newer systems, the game includes both the Revenge of the Plague Lord content, and the additional content from the 2019 Switch release, as well at least one additional new class and additional content.

== Reception ==
Reception

Aggregate scores
Aggregator	Score						
Aggregator	DS	NS	PC	PS2	PSP	Wii	Xbox 360
GameRankings	81.37%		83.75%	78.00%	84.88%	71.07%	88.14%
Metacritic	82/100	78/100	84/100	78/100	84/100	71/100	87/100

Review scores
Publication	Score						
Publication	DS	NS	PC	PS2	PSP	Wii	Xbox 360
Eurogamer	8/10						9/10
GamePro	4.5/5						4.75/5
GameRevolution	B+				B+		
GameSpot	8.1/10			8/10	8.5/10	7.5/10	9/10
GameSpy	4/5		3.5/5	4/5	4.5/5	3.5/5	
GameTrailers					8.4/10		
GameZone	8/10			8.7/10	8.8/10	7.6/10	
IGN	8.9/10		8.6/10	7.8/10	9/10	7/10	9/10
Nintendo Life		7/10					
Nintendo World Report	9/10	8/10				6/10	
RPGamer		3.5/5					
TeamXbox							8.5/10
X-Play	4/5						

Puzzle Quest was a giant surprise hit, receiving very positive reviews from the gaming community. IGN stated that the PSP version of the game "managed to combine the best aspects of both [puzzle and RPG] genres into one nice little package." Hyper's Maurice Branscombe commends the game for being a "fantastic puzzle game, mixed with simple, yet compelling, RPG elements". However, he criticizes it for having a "cookie cutter RPG story".

MTV Networks' GameTrailers awarded Puzzle Quest the title of "Best Puzzle/Parlor Game" of 2007. Future's Next Generation online ranked it as the 17th best game released in 2007. GameSpy awarded it "Best Xbox Live Arcade Game" of 2007. The Xbox Live Arcade version was listed as the 6th best title of all time for that platform by the IGN staff in a September 2010 compilation.

During the 11th Annual Interactive Achievement Awards, the Academy of Interactive Arts & Sciences awarded Puzzle Quest with "Downloadable Game of the Year", along with receiving a nomination for "Handheld Game of the Year".

=== The Legend Returns ===
Puzzle Quest: The Legend Returns received an aggregate score of 78/100 on Metacritic.

Neal Ronaghan of Nintendo World Report stated that while the game "shows its age in its presentation, the combat still soars". He noted that, in the 12 years since the original game's release, "similar genre-blending games have cropped up, but in a way, nothing has really matched or surpassed the complexity of Puzzle Quest". Praising the game's "good variety of brand new content, most notably found in five new classes", he stated that "the class variety is awesome", but offered criticism of the mechanic, claiming that "the depth and length of the game makes running multiple characters not all that fun".

He criticised the game's story, stating that "the mostly generic fantasy plot and lore never grabbed me", despite the remaster's newfound emphasis on background details. Calling the visual presentation "basic", he stated that it did not make the world more endearing. While saying that the game was "deep and memorable", he nevertheless criticised it as dated, saying that most of its aspects felt like "something straight out of 2007", and singling out the "bland visuals and presentation".

Anna Marie Privitere of RPGamer said that "the Switch version of Puzzle Quest is the best the game has ever looked". She stated that the game was "the definitive way to play the first adventure, despite the slowdowns and occasional crash".

Jeff Ramos of Polygon called the game "a match-three time capsule", saying that it "makes so few changes to the original design, it bypasses much of what is the 'norm' for similar, modern titles". He praised the game's lack of "microtransactions, timers, or other attention-grabbing pings", saying that in comparison to other mobile games, it "can feel remarkably quiet and peaceful".

== Notes ==
The Nintendo DS version is known in Japan as Simple DS Series Vol. 23: The Puzzle Quest: Agaria no Kishi (SIMPLE DSシリーズ Vol. 23 THE パズルクエスト〜アガリアの騎士〜)

The PlayStation Portable version is known in Japan as Simple 2500 Series Vol. 11: The Puzzle Quest: Agaria no Kishi (SIMPLE 2500シリーズ Vol. 11 THE パズルクエスト〜アガリアの騎士〜)
