= Puzzle Quest: Galactrix =

2009 video game

- Developers: Infinite Interactive, Aspyr Media
- Publisher: D3 Publisher
- Platforms: Nintendo DS, PlayStation 3 (PSN), Windows, Xbox 360 (XBLA)
- Release: February 24, 2009: Nintendo DS; NA: February 24, 2009; PAL: March 13, 2009 Windows; NA: February 24, 2009; PAL: March 27, 2009 Xbox 360; NA: April 8, 2009 PlayStation 3; NA: May 7, 2009; PAL: June 11, 2009
- Genre: Puzzle
- Modes: Single-player, multiplayer

Puzzle Quest: Galactrix, or Galactrix, is a puzzle video game developed by Infinite Interactive for the PC, Nintendo DS, Xbox 360's Xbox Live Arcade, and PlayStation 3's PlayStation Network service.

The game offers a full-featured campaign mode, online multiplayer for 2 to 4 players, and downloadable content, including ships, items, plans, planets, factions, and missions.

== Gameplay ==
Galactrix gameplay screenshot.

Like the original Puzzle Quest, Galactrix has Bejeweled-style gameplay with a few exceptions. Tiles are now hexagonally shaped, and gravity will be a factor in how they fall. If the match takes place in orbit around a planet, the tiles will always fall downward, but in open space new tiles will come from the direction of the player's previous move.

Unlike the original Puzzle Quest, Galactrix's quests have the player traveling various planets, star systems, and the entire galaxy. D3 Publisher has stated that there will be a diplomacy system and commodity system as well as the ability to collect, customize and build ships.

=== Tiles ===
There are currently two basic forms of tiles:

- Colored tiles (red, yellow, green, blue, purple, and silver); Red tiles relate to the player's weapons gauge, yellow tiles correspond to the player's engine gauge, blue tiles recharge the ship's shields and green tiles represent the ship's computer. The purple tiles represent psi power while the silver tiles are intel tiles.
- Numbered attack tiles have replaced skull tiles: Now whenever the player matches one of these numbered tiles, the amount of damage done will be the sum of all the numbers on any attack tile they complete.

=== Puzzle Types ===
All the puzzles use tiles with small changes in the rules and large differences in the goals.

- Combat: This represents combat between spaceships. The ships have the equipment (the equivalent of spells in Puzzle Quest) which use gunnery, engineering, and science energy corresponding with red, yellow, and green tiles respectively. Damage is caused in two ways: by matching numbered attack tiles and/or by using certain pieces of ship equipment. The health of a ship is composed of shield and hull strength. Direct damage dealt to a ship must eliminate the shields before reducing the hull strength. When a ship's hull strength is reduced to 0, the ship is destroyed, and the battle is over. Shields can be replenished by matching blue tiles and/or by using certain pieces of the ship or equipment, while grey tiles produce intel and purple tiles produce psi power. Both intel and psi power are persistent between battles. Intel is useful for increasing the level of your character between battles by giving bonuses to the amount of energy players begin with at the start of each battle or allowing you to increase the maximum energy your character gets when matching red, yellow, green, or blue gems. Psi powers are used to skip battles with enemy ships of the player's choosing--such as when you feel your ship is not powerful enough to take on a particular opponent. Psi power can only be used against the weakest ships early in the game, but later on, in the game can be used for stronger and stronger enemies.
- Hacking Leap gates: To proceed from one-star system to another one must use a leap gate. At the beginning of the game all leap gates are locked. The hacking puzzle is used to open these leap gates which, in turn, allow access to additional puzzles in other areas of the galaxy. Hacked leap gates generally stay open once hacked but randomly, over time, some leap gates will close, again requiring hacking. There are no attack tiles during this puzzle type. The objective here is to copy the list of matches that the computer will "feed" you (for example, if the computer shows you a configuration of blue, red, blue--then you must match these colors at that moment and in that order). There will be a pre-determined list of colored tiles that need to be matched (in a specific order) within a specified time limit. When a target color is at the top of the player's list, other color tiles can still be matched--though they will not count toward the score, as matches from this list must be fulfilled in the specific order in which they are presented to the player for the player to accumulate points.
- Mining: To acquire the raw materials needed to craft spaceships and parts, the player must mine asteroids. The goal of mining is to extract raw materials by matching gems that represent them. When there are no more legal moves left, the puzzle ends, and the player gets all materials that were extracted. If a player manages to extract the maximum output of the asteroid before the legal moves run out, then that player gets a bonus for the number of materials extracted.
- Crafting: Players can craft parts and ships at any shop, provided that the required raw materials are in the hold. Crafting requires matches of red, yellow, and green gems...creating a new token of the same color. The goal of crafting is to clear a specific number of the new tokens that are created, which can be matched together regardless of color. Crafting also features an unmovable gem that can still be cleared if matched.
- Haggling: Haggling can be performed from the purchase menu of shops. Players will be presented with a board and are given the task of clearing, as many gems as possible. However, instead of new gems falling to fill in the gaps, inactive black tokens fall. The percentage advantage earned from haggling can be used as a discount on a single purchase, or as a bonus on the sale of a single part or ship. This puzzle becomes available after Pezt joins the player's crew.
- Gathering Rumours: This puzzle becomes available after Elgara joins the player's crew. The goal of these puzzles is to survive a certain number of turns without matching special nuke tokens. Chain combos do not affect the turn counter. Rumours generally provide background information to the setting of Galactrix and do not seem to provide any readily usable in-game advantage to the player, except for imparting an Intel bonus, useful for increasing the level of the player's character.

== Synopsis ==
=== Factions ===
==== Human factions ====
The four main Human factions all grew from the four Megacorporation's that created the Leap Gate system.

- MRI: The Multinational Resource & Investment Group initiated the leap gate project. Its entire staff is composed of telepaths who are involved with selective-breeding programs to enhance their telepathic powers.
- Lumina: A militaristic, religious group that provisions information pertinent to the advancement of whatever quantum technology comprises the foundation of the leap gates. They remain on Earth and safeguard valuable information that has been compiled over the course of many millennia.
- CyTech: This faction provided the software and AI needed to operate the leap gates. They began as a simple software company, but after the invention of their clever drones, they were able to take a bigger role in the leap gate program.
- Trident: The Trident Corporation provided the ships and engines that were needed to move the leap gates through space and was the first organization to get unmanned ships to travel faster than light. It focuses primarily on military ships and has the biggest fleet in the galaxy. Other megacorporation's are keeping a close eye on Trident because of its growing presence.

==== Alien factions ====
- Jahrwoxi: Hairy little creatures that are dishonest and annoying, and they will take anything that is not theirs.
- Vortraag: Lizard like creatures that put up quite a resistance against the humans. A ferocious and powerful race, many actually flee their home planet and turn to piracy.
- Krystalli: The MRI group is set on eliminating the few Krystalli that are left. They are silicon-based life forms that are similar to slow-moving telepathic rocks.
- Elysians: The empire moved in on the Elysians' planet because it was like paradise. It subsequently enslaved the small and frail Elysians and treated their planet like a tourist hot spot.
- Quesada: The Quesadans are a deeply religious group and one of the few who have their religion officially sanctioned by the empire. Their planet is full of ancient secrets and treasures, which could also be why the empire has such a keen interest in them.
- Degani: The Degani are known for their hospitality and the quality of their food.
- Plasmids: These creatures are composed of small living crystals that move through water. They communicate using strange gurgling sounds and are almost invisible to humans.
- Keck: Birdlike and nomadic in nature, Kecks are a merchant race that can be persistent and annoying.

==== Enemy factions ====
- Pirates: Pirates are usually found in the outermost star systems and in the Gomorrah system. They enjoy attacking transports and travelers passing through their territory.
- The Soulless: These creatures are the product of the MRI's twisted experiments and happen to be faster and smarter than humans. They have no morals or inhibitions, yet they strive to become the perfect being.

=== Plot ===
Thousands of years in the future, mankind expands their domains beyond the limits of the Solar System, assuming control of dozens of other planetary systems, connected by a network of jump gates that allow fast travel between them. Each system is controlled by one of the four megacorporation's who compete against each other for supremacy over the human empire. The player starts the game as a novice pilot at service of one of these megacorporation's, the MRI. As the game progresses, more characters are added to the player's crew, each one possessing special abilities helping to improve the player's arsenal and resources, while interacting with each one of the megacorporation's and even some alien races and uncovering the secret of a mysterious threat that may endanger the entire galaxy.

== Reception ==
Reception

Aggregate scores
| Aggregator | Score | | | |
| Aggregator | DS | PC | PS3 | Xbox 360 |
|---|---|---|---|---|
| GameRankings | 75.53% | 72.52% | 75.64% | 78.04% |
| Metacritic | 75/100 | 72/100 | 72/100 | 76/100 |

Review scores
| Publication | Score | | | |
| Publication | DS | PC | PS3 | Xbox 360 |
|---|---|---|---|---|
| 1Up.com | | C+ | | |
| Game Informer | 8.25/10 | | | |
| GamePro | | | | 4/5 |
| GameRevolution | C+ | C+ | | |
| GameSpot | | 5.5/10 | | |
| GameSpy | 4/5 | 4/5 | | |
| GameTrailers | 8.2/10 | | | |
| GameZone | 8.6/10 | 7/10 | 8.4/10 | 8/10 |
| Giant Bomb | | | | 3/5 |
| IGN | 8.4/10 | 8.5/10 | 8.5/10 | 8.5/10 |
| Nintendo World Report | 4/10 | | | |
| TeamXbox | | | | 8.7/10 |

Hyper's Daniel Wilks commends the game for being "very bloody challenging [and] a good amount of variety in gameplay". However, he criticizes the game for relying "on luck as much as skill [and the] controls are a bit iffy".

- 6.5/10 - Nintendo World Report
- 5/5 - Kidzworld

== See also ==
- List of puzzle video games
- Puzzle Quest: Challenge of the Warlords
- Hexic
