= 505 Games =

Italian video game publisher

505 Games S.p.A.
- Type: Subsidiary
- Industry: Video games
- Founded: 2006; 20 years ago
- Headquarters: Milan, Italy
- Parent: Digital Bros
- Subsidiaries: 505 Mobile; DR Studios; Hawken Entertainment; Infinity Plus Two
- Website: 505games.com

505 Games S.p.A. is an Italian video game publisher based in Milan. It was founded in 2006 as a subsidiary of Milan-based Digital Bros.

== History ==
In 2004, Digital Bros created a publishing label entitled 505 GameStreet that would release mainly budget-priced video games in Europe and Australia, mainly those taken from D3Publisher's Simple series.

In 2006, 505 GameStreet was reestablished as a standalone subsidiary entitled 505 Games, based in Milan. The company found its early success through its video games such as Cooking Mama and Zumba Fitness.

In April 2012, 505 Games took over publishing duties from THQ for the fitness game Adidas MiCoach, following a lawsuit between THQ and Adidas. In April 2013, it acquired the license of Drawn To Life series. The purchase included rights to the franchise as a whole. In November 2013, it canceled Ashes Cricket 2013 and issued refunds. In April 2014, 505 Games announced a publishing agreement with Adam Orth's Three One Zero of the game Adrift. The game is described as a first-person experience, where the player controls an astronaut exploring debris of a wrecked station in outer space. In January 2015, 505 Games confirmed the acquisition of the intellectual property (IP) rights to the multi-award-winning Game of the Year 2013, Brothers: A Tale of Two Sons from Starbreeze Studios. In April 2015, 505 Games announced a publishing agreement with Swedish game developer Starbreeze for the game Overkill's The Walking Dead, which released in late 2018. A month later, 505 Games announced a publishing agreement with game developer Overkill Software for the game Payday 2 Crimewave Edition. In August 2016, 505 Games announced it would be publishing Virginia from Variable State.

In March 2015, 505 Games purchased 2.67% stock of Swedish game developer Starbreeze Studios. In January 2016, 505 Games announced that it will shift its focus from publishing games for other developers to developing its own intellectual properties. In October 2016, 505 Games has announced through Koji Igarashi, its collaboration in publishing Bloodstained: Ritual of the Night from Igarashi's own ArtPlay, DICO and Inti Creates, though Inti's involvement has been reduced. At the Sony E3 press conference on 11 June 2018, 505 Games announced a partnership with Remedy Entertainment to publish Control.

505 Games acquired Australia-based Infinity Plus Two, the developers of the Puzzle Quest games in January 2021.

505 Games worked with Rabbit and Bear Studios to publish Eiyuden Chronicle: Hundred Heroes, a spiritual successor to the Suikoden series. The partnership was announced February 2021.

On 27 June 2022 D3 Go! was acquired by 505 Games. The acquisition also included the intellectual property of the Puzzle Quest games.

In November 2023, 505 Games parent company Digital Bros announced plans to lay off about 30% of its global workforce—around 130 employees. Job cuts continued into 2024, when 505 Games closed offices in Germany, Spain, and France.

In February 2024, 505 Games sold the IP rights to Control back to developer Remedy Entertainment for €17 million.

== Games published ==
Games published by 505 Games include Sniper Elite III, Payday 2, Assetto Corsa, Brothers: A Tale of Two Sons, Terraria, Redout, How to Survive, Defense Grid 2, Deep Black, Abzû, Adrift, Virginia, Dead by Daylight, Control, Unturned, Indivisible, Wuchang: Fallen Feathers, and the PC and Xbox Series X/S release of Death Stranding.

== Accolades ==
In April 2015, 505 Games was awarded the title of Best Indie Games Label at the MCV Awards.
