= Warlords (video game series) =

- Genre: Turn-based strategy
- Developers: Strategic Studies Group; Infinite Interactive
- Publishers: Strategic Studies Group; Red Orb Entertainment; Ubisoft
- Creator: Steve Fawkner
- Platforms: MS-DOS, Amiga, Mac OS, Windows
- First release: Warlords; 1990
- Latest release: Warlords IV: Heroes of Etheria; October 21, 2003
- Spin-offs: Warlords Battlecry series Puzzle Quest series

Warlords is a video game series created by Steve Fawkner, in which role-playing elements are combined with turn-based strategy in a fantasy setting. The series began with Warlords in 1990 and includes three other games, two expansion packs, and several spinoffs. Gameplay centers around key elements such as units, heroes, cities, and diplomacy, with players managing resources, engaging in combat, and navigating political relationships. Over time, the series introduced new mechanics like hero recruitment, city conquest, and advanced diplomatic systems. Notable spin-offs include Warlords Battlecry and Puzzle Quest: Challenge of the Warlords.

== Gameplay ==
The central aspects of Warlords game series are units, heroes, cities and diplomacy.

=== Units ===
Units are the expendable resource in Warlords, produced and/or purchased in all active cities. Units come in different types such as light infantry, archers, elephants, and even mythological creatures such as minotaurs and unicorns. All units in Warlords have several standard properties: strength, distance of movement per turn, cost, and upkeep. Some have additional special abilities such as flying, bonuses to defense or combat, or traversing difficult terrain without hindrances. Since the introduction of Warlords III, units also have hit points.

Allies are a special type of unit only found by searching ruins or hidden temples. Allies are relatively powerful compared to regular units, do not require upkeep, and often include one or more special abilities. Allies include units such as wizards, dragons, devils, and archons (angels). Some versions of the game, such as Warlords II, have an option to allow cities to produce allies like regular units. In this case, the allies require upkeep and have a production cost.

=== Heroes ===
Heroes are a special type of unit with a unique set of properties and special abilities:

- Possess items - Heroes may pick up items found in ruins or in hidden tombs. These items increase the hero's or his stack combat abilities, player income, or the ability to cast spells (Warlords III);
- Search ruins and hidden tombs - Heroes may search ruins and hidden tombs to fight a special enemy unit. If successful, the hero is rewarded with money, items, or allies;
- Receive and complete a quest - A hero may receive a quest from a temple, whereupon completion results in a reward of money, items, or allies. Only one hero at a time may be on a quest;
- Cast spells - Starting with Warlords III, heroes may gain the ability to cast spells.
- Experience Points - Heroes are the only units to gain experience points by killing enemy units, conquering cities, and completing quests. More experience results in higher levels, up to a maximum of level 5 (except in Warlords IV) increasing the unit's combat abilities and movement per level. In Warlords IV the player may keep three units from each battle as a personal retinue. This creates a replayability within the game and allows the player to obtain very high levels with each of the units held in the retinue (well above level 5).

Each player begins play with a level 1 hero at the start of the game. Unlike other units, additional heroes cannot be produced by cities or discovered in ruins or hidden tombs. The only way to gain a new hero is to accept an offer in exchange for money. Newly hired heroes often come with allies. Heroes have the potential to be the most powerful unit in the game.

=== Cities ===
The game flow of Warlords typically involves capturing the cities. The default winning condition is to conquer most of the cities on the map.

The cities are the main source of new units in the game. Up to four different units can be available in a single city with an ability for player to buy production — to replace the currently available units with others at some initial cost. Once the player owning the city orders production of a unit, the city will provide new units of a kind until another order is issued. The production may be forwarded from one city to another, allowing the player to concentrate armies on the borderline or in another location of strategic interest.

The cities also serve a defense purpose: the defenders of a city enjoy the "city bonus", which increases armies' strength. Several units have the special ability to cancel the city bonus.

After capturing a city, the player has a choice whether to occupy, pillage, sack or raze it. Once razed, the city cannot be rebuilt. Sacking the city removes all the production options returning the player half of their cost. Pillaging the city results in removal of some production options (those being the most expensive units in Warlords and Warlords II, and the units a player cannot produce in Warlords III).

=== Diplomacy ===
The relations between the players are regulated by the diplomacy: the players should declare wars before actually engaging their armies in battles. While there is a possibility to attack another player without prior negotiations, such behavior may be followed by unilateral declaration of war by all other players on a violator.

=== Battles ===
The battles in Warlords (with the exception of Warlords IV) are non-interactive. The process of battle is shown as two enemy stacks opposing each other; when a unit is killed it disappears from the battle screen. The outcome of the battle is calculated using the units' abilities and several other factors using a sophisticated algorithm.

== Original series ==
The games of the series are noted for the strong AI.

The games are set in the fantasy world of Etheria, and tend to be based around the traditional premise of good versus evil, with neutrality in between. Heroes on the side of good are the Sirian Knights, the mercantile Empires of Men, the elves and the dwarves. On the side of evil are the demonic horsemen: the Lord of Plague, the Lord of Famine, the Lord of War, and the ever present Lord Bane, Lord of Death.

The politics of the world, however, are more complicated than they first appear, particularly in the third installment of the series. For example, the Minotaurs, who were created as servants for Sartek, the Lord of War, are a neutral race rather than an evil one. Also, the third game opens with the human Empire pillaging and exploiting the newly discovered lands of the peaceful Srrathi snakemen, in an obvious nod to the historical European conquest of the Americas. Most importantly from a player's point of view, a Hero's race is not as important in determining his or her moral alignment as is his or her choice of class. For example, while the Undead are evil as a rule, an Undead Paladin would be treated as good (though such a thing is only possible in the third game, wherein all previous restrictions on race and class combinations have been removed).

=== Warlords ===
The first game in the series, Warlords, was created in 1990 by Steven Fawkner and was published by SSG. It featured eight different clans battling for the control of the mythical land of Illuria: Sirians, Storm Giants, Grey Dwarves, Orcs of Kor, Elvallie, Horse Lords, Selentines, and Lord Bane. Each clan could either be controlled by the computer or by a human player, allowing up to eight participants taking turns in hot seat play. Gameplay consisted of moving units, attacking opponent units or cities, adjusting production in cities, and moving hero units to explore ruins, temples, libraries, and to discover allies, relics, and other items. The goal of the game was to conquer the land of Illuria by capturing or razing at least two thirds of the cities in the land.

=== Warlords II ===
Following the success of Warlords, SSG released Warlords II in 1993. This version included five maps (although the later released mission pack increased the number). Another new feature was 'fog of war' - optionally, enemy units or even the map could be concealed from players without units close enough to see them. The interface of the game was improved, as were the graphics (with additional unique city graphics for each different player). Moreover, the game featured multiple army, city, and terrain sets (still in 16 colours), play by e-mail as well as hot seat, and a random map generator and map editor.

The updated version of the game — Warlords II Deluxe — was released in 1995. It allowed for custom tile, army and city sets for maps and provided support for 256 colours. Thanks to the publication of the editor, Warlords II Deluxe led to an increase of user-created content. Many new maps, army and terrain sets, and scenarios were distributed on the Internet for the game.

=== Warlords III ===
After a four-year hiatus, SSG developed Warlords III: Reign of Heroes.

The game was released for Microsoft Windows and used new system capabilities to dramatically improve graphics:

- animated armies' movements
- skinnable user interface
- several landscape options
- more advanced city graphics

The heroes acquired the ability to cast spells to receive a temporary benefit. Each spell has its price expressed in mana points, which became the second (after gold) resource in game.

The campaign system also became more advanced: the heroes from the previous game of the campaign followed the user to the new game, keeping their experience and items.

The concept of diplomacy was further refined by adding new state of diplomatic relations: Treaty. This state allowed players trespassing each other's cities and winning the Allied victory exterminating all other parties. Another feature introduced in Reign of Heroes was the ability to bribe enemies, thus influencing their diplomatic decisions. The amount of bribe could be fine-tuned; the more substantial bribe, the greater the chance of a desired outcome.

In addition to the previously available multiplayer modes (hotseat and play by email) the Reign of Heroes introduced the ability to play over network.

Shortly after releasing Reign of Heroes, SSG followed with Warlords III: Darklords Rising — a stand-alone expansion pack. It featured the new maps and units and contained the sample graphics to facilitate development of alternative tile, army and city sets. The plot of the main campaign continued where the previous game had left off.

Warlords III like Warlords II had a campaign editor and realistic terrain model.

By the time of Warlords III games' releases the real-time strategy game genre was in full-swing, so there was less of a market for turn-based games. The oncoming rush of first-person shooters and first generation MMORPGs also did not help the popularity of the series. The turn-based strategy genre in general would take a hit during this period.

=== Warlords IV ===
Warlords IV, released in 2003, used pre-rendered 3D sprites for its unit and city graphics and particle graphics for various effects. Despite this, the game had an overall 2D look to it.

The game flow was dramatically simplified. Diplomacy played virtually no role in the game, and micromanagement of units was scaled-down to a great extent. Rather than having multiple units battling it out at once, combat is one-on-one: the players could choose which units they wished to send into battle, one after another in the stack. The units with ranged attack capabilities get involved in every round in the battle regardless of active unit though. In warfare, the cities no longer added a fixed amount to the fighting values of the defenders, but rather fired random archery shots between the defenders' strikes.

Although heroes were still obtainable in the usual way, it was now possible to routinely produce them in the top level castles as well.

The city upgrades became more important, as the level of city determines the range of units it can produce.

The races in game became predefined: knights, empire, elves, dark elves, dwarves, dragons, undead, demons, orcs and ogres. Each of these races had its traits, giving it advantages and disadvantages regarding the race of the opposing player. Each player had a certain favored race, and the pace of production of units belonging to other races depended on the interracial relations.

The player's character in this game was personified as a special unit which only involved in battles over the capital city and could not move around the map. The defeat of the warlord led to defeat of the player, so that all possessed cities became neutral. Traits the player picked at the time of warlord creation gave the warlord some benefits and limitations in the game. The warlord character could be reused in other campaigns.

== Spin-offs ==
=== Card game ===
Warlords is an out-of-print collectible card game published in September 1997 by Iron Crown Enterprises.

=== Battlecry series ===
Warlords Battlecry is a real-time strategy computer game released in July 2000 for Microsoft Windows. Two sequels were released: Warlords Battlecry II in 2002 and Warlords Battlecry III in 2004.

=== Puzzle Quest series ===
Puzzle Quest: Challenge of the Warlords is a puzzle game based on the Warlords universe released in 2007 for the Nintendo DS and PlayStation Portable. The game spawned several sequels.

== See also ==
- List of 4X video games
