= Dogz 2 and Catz 2 =

Dogz 2, Catz 2, Petz: Dogz 2, Petz: Catz 2, Dogz II or Catz II may refer to:

- Petz: Dogz 2 and Catz 2 (adventure games), a pair of 2007 RPGs for the Wii and PS2
- Petz: Dogz 2 and Catz 2 (virtual pet video games), a pair of 2007 virtual pet games for the PC and DS
- Petz: Dogz 2 (Nintendo DS video game), a virtual pet game 2007 for the DS
- Dogz 2, a 2007 expanded reissue of Dogz for Game Boy Advance
- Dogz II and Catz II, 1997 pair of virtual pet games
