= Dogz and Catz (2006 video games) =

Dogz Catz
- PC cover art of the two versions; Dogz (left), Catz (right)
- Developers: ImaginEngine; Powerhead Games
- Publisher: Ubisoft
- Platforms: Windows, Nintendo DS
- Release: 2006
- Genre: virtual pet

Dogz and Catz are a pair of 2006 virtual pet simulation games released for Windows PCs, developed by ImaginEngine, and published by Ubisoft. The games are part of the Petz series, and in some markets were marketed as Dogz 6 and Catz 6.

A port of Catz for the Nintendo DS, developed by Powerhead Games was released at the same time. However, this was not the case for the Dogz game on DS, which was a port of a Game Boy Advance game. Nor is it related to the Gameboy Advance game Catz.

== Gameplay ==
The player adopts, one of five types of cats or dogs and names them. In a home environment, the user can then play with it. The two PC games are mostly the same apart from the choice of pet being raised. The DS game allows the player to speak the name of their Cat to attract its attention. The player also most manage the animals' "natural needs" including keeping track of when they need to be fed and cleaned, for example.

== Development ==
The original Dogz and Catz games were developed by PF Magic in the mid 90s making use of 2D sprites to render characters—an approach they originally developed for Ballz. After a series of acquisitions, the Petz franchise came to be owned by Ubisoft, with the final game using the original style being Dogz 5 and Catz 5 in 2002. After several years of inactivity, Ubisoft wanted to "re-invent" the series—partially to compete with Nintendo's Nintendogs—and so released a host of games in 2006 (including Dogz, Catz, Hamsterz and Horsez). Unlike the original games, these Dogz and Catz games were developed using full 3D graphics, for the characters and environments.

The theme for Catz on both platforms was a version of the "Kitty Cat Song" officially titled "Meow Meow Lullaby Remix", performed by Nada Surf.

== Reception ==
Reception
Catz

Aggregate score
Aggregator	Score
GameRankings	(DS) 51%

Review scores
Publication	Score
Consoles +	(DS) 8/20
GameZone	(DS) 4.4/10
IGN	(DS) 5/10
Jeuxvideo.com	(PC) 8/20 (DS) 8/20
Computer Bild Spiele	(DS) 3.8/10
Spazio Games	(PC) 5.0/10

Dogz

Review scores
Publication	Score
Jeuxvideo.com	(PC) 8/20
Spazio Games	(PC) 5.0/10

A review of the PC versions of Catz and Dogz, by Jeuxvideo, found that both games became boring quickly, due to a lack of "relevant activities". Dogz was criticised for its lacklustre music by Spazio Games, with the same publication being unimpressed by both games' graphics.

The DS version was widely seen as being closely modelled on Nintendo's Nintendogs. Lucas Thomas, of IGN, thought that the game was mediocre, criticising its camera controls and lack of content. The lack of activities was also a major problem highlighted in a review in Computer Bild Spiele.
