= Pet toy =

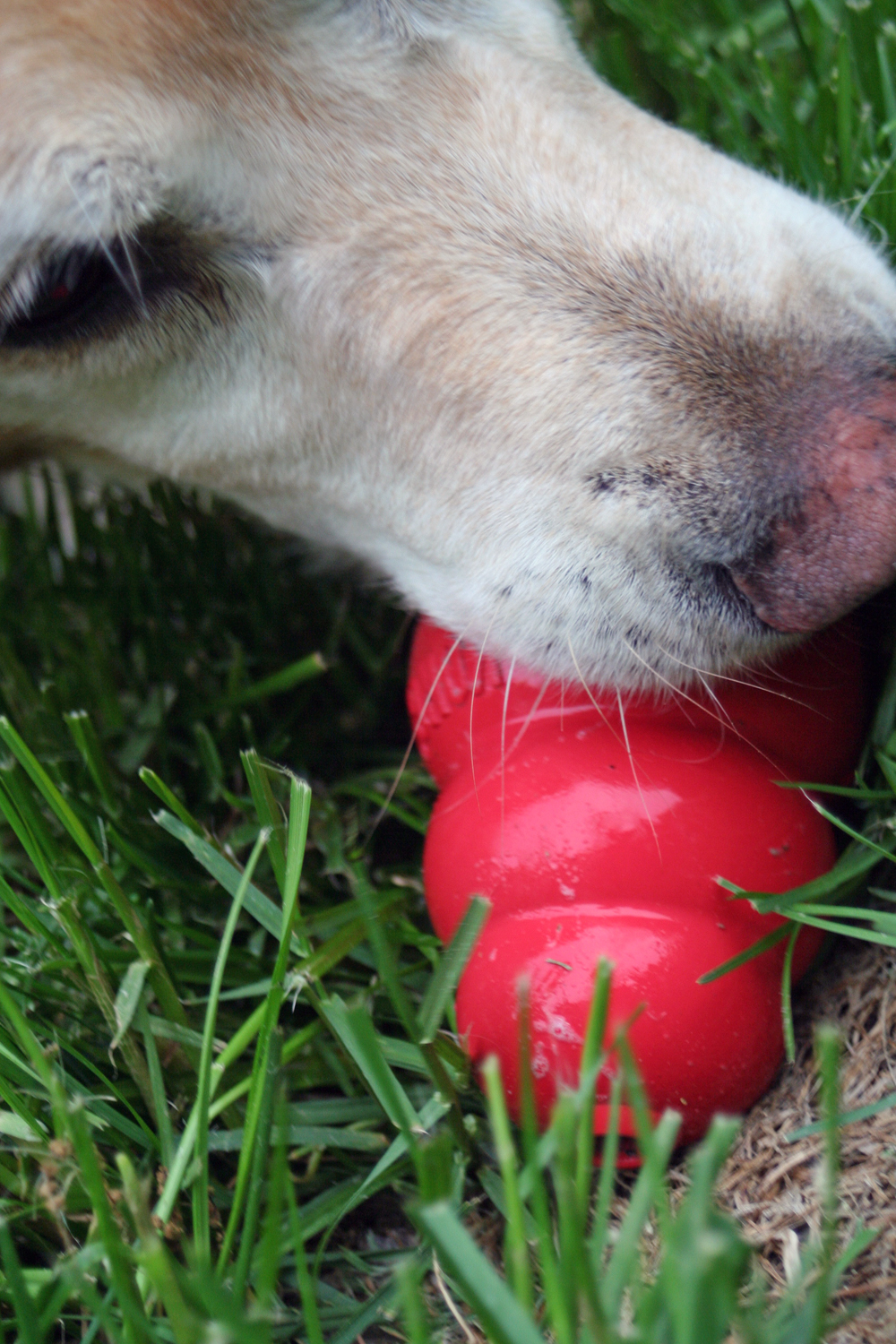
Dog chewing a red Kong

Pet toys can refer to toys intended for pet animals, or to toys that take the form of pets. Examples include:

== Toys for pets ==
- Cat toy - toys for pet cats
- Chew toy - most commonly associated with dogs, but also for birds, rodents and rabbits
- Dog toy - toys for pet dogs
- Squeaky toy - commonly marketed for pets, especially dogs.

== Toys in the form of pets ==
- Robotic pet - artificially intelligent machines that are made to resemble actual pets. Examples include
  - AIBO
  - Furby
  - ZhuZhu Pets
- Space Pets
- Stuffed toy (also known as plush toys, cuddly toys and other names) - soft toys that are commonly made to resemble pet animals. Specific characters include:
  - My Pet Monster
- Virtual pet (also known as digital or artificial pets) - hardware or software based electronic alternatives to or stimulations of pets. Examples include:
  - CloudPets
  - Digimon
  - Digital Monster
  - Giga Pet
  - Petz (Catz and Dogz)
  - Tamogatchi

== See also ==
- Pet rock
- Tea Pets - a Chinese animated film also released as Pets & Toys
