= Catz (disambiguation) =

Catz is a commune of the Manche département in France.

Catz may also refer to:

- Caroline Catz (born Caroline Caplan), an English actress
- Safra Catz, an Israeli-born American businesswoman
- One of a number of games in the Petz series:
  - Catz: Your Computer Pet, a 1996 computer game
  - Catz (2006 video game), a 2006 computer game and DS game
- St Catharine's College, Cambridge, a Cambridge University college
- St Catherine's College, Oxford, an Oxford University college

== See also ==
- Katz (disambiguation)
- Cat
