= Petz: Dogz 2 and Catz 2 (virtual pet video games) =

Petz: Dogz 2 Petz: Catz 2
- PC cover art of the two European versions; Petz: Dogz 2 (left), Petz: Catz 2 (right)
- Developers: ImaginEngine; Powerhead Games
- Publisher: Ubisoft
- Platforms: Windows, Nintendo DS
- Release: 2007
- Genre: virtual pet

Petz: Dogz 2 and Petz: Catz 2 are a pair of 2007 virtual pet simulation games released for Windows PCs, developed by ImaginEngine, and published by Ubisoft. The games are part of the Petz series, and in some markets were marketed as Dogz 2 and Catz 2.

A port of Petz: Catz 2 for the Nintendo DS, developed by Powerhead Games was released at the same time. However, this was not the case for the Petz: Dogz 2 game on DS.

== Gameplay ==
In the PC versions of Petz: Dogz 2 and Catz 2, the player adopts, one of a number of types of cats or dogs, names them and can customise them, by for example selecting their coat colour. The player can also dress their pet up in various unlockable accessories. The pet can then explores the rooms of a virtual rooms with the player interacting with them. The player must manage the needs of their pet.

In the DS version, the player can chose between 13 breeds. Milestones are marked with awards called "ribons", which IGN compared to achievements.

== Reception ==
Reception
Petz: Catz 2

Review scores
Publication	Score
Gamekult	(DS) 4/10
IGN	(DS) 6.7/10
Jeuxvideo.com	(DS) 12/20 (PC) 5/20
Family Friendly Gaming	(DS) 79/100

Petz: Dogz 2

Review score
Publication	Score
Jeuxvideo.com	(PC) 5/20

Lucas Thomas, of IGN, thought the DS version of Petz: Catz 2 was an improvement over its predecessor, Catz for the DS, being "a more playable and engaging game experience". He specifically enjoyed the structure and direction the new ribbon system imparted. A review of the same version by Jeuxvideo was disappointed by the disappearance of the microphone, when compared to the first game. Even still the reviewer saw the game as an overall improvement, calling it the best cat game on the system. Another feature that was seen as missing, by Gamekult, was the ability to buy furniture.

On the other hand, the PC versions were criticized by Jeuxvideo for the lack of improvement made to any of the flaws of the previous ImaginEngine's Catz and Dogz. A review in Strana Igr disliked how similar Dogz 2 was to Catz 2.
