= Hamsterz Life =

2006 video game

- Developer: Digital Kids
- Publishers: JP: Digital Kids; NA: Ubisoft
- Platform: Nintendo DS
- Release: JP: November 2, 2006; NA: November 28, 2006
- Genre: Simulation
- Mode: Single-player

Hamsterz Life (Hamsterz in some territories) is a pet simulation and virtual pet video game in the Petz series, focusing on hamsters, for the Nintendo DS. It was developed by the Japanese company Digital Kids and released in Japan as Rabu Rabu Hamusutā (LOVEラブハムスタ, Love Love Hamster).

In 2008, Petz: Bunnyz was released, which consisted of the same game but with hamsters swapped with rabbits.

== Gameplay ==
Hamsterz Life lets players to take care of up to 5 hamsters at once, and choose customizable cages for them to live in. Just as in the other Petz games, players can interact with their hamsters by training, playing with, and feeding them. Hamsters start out as pups and eventually grow into adults during play.

Various actions can be chosen including training, feeding, care and other options. Training consists of teaching the hamster words (which they repeat back in their own hamster speak) by saying the set phrases into the DS microphone. The hamster can repeat these phrases back, but it presents as a speech bubble from the hamster without audio. Players can feed their hamsters, clean their cage, and brush their hamsters. Players can only have one hamster at home at once; any other hamsters that are owned are left with the character Hammy until the player wishes to switch hamsters. The player's hamsters can visit with the hamsters of friends who also own Hamsterz Life via the connect feature. When playing mini-games, if players win, they receive prizes such as food, toys, cages, or cage decorations. Toys can be put into the cage for the hamsters to play with. Players can let their hamster out of its cage to play in the surrounding room. There may be present boxes in the room, which contain prizes they receive when their hamster finds them.

Hamsterz Life includes mini-games sprinkled throughout gameplay, including: "Ball Get/Capture", "Memory Training", "Fish Scooping", and "Slide Panel".

== Development ==
The game was originally developed by Digital Kids for the Japanese market, as Love Love Hamster. After several years of inactivity, Ubisoft was looking to "re-invent" the Petz series—partially to compete with Nintendo's Nintendogs—and so released a host of games in 2006 (including Hamsterz Dogz, Catz and Horsez). To do this Ubisoft simply translated and rebranded Love Love Hamster as Hamsterz Life, and as such the game shares little in common with previous Petz series games.

A year later Ubisoft would acquire Digital Kids, citing the studio's track record with games such as Hamsterz Life. In 2008, Digital Kids and Ubisoft produced what IGN called "a clone" of the original game, with rabbits in place of hamsters. Apart from the change of animals, and alteration to some graphics, Petz: Bunnyz remained almost identical to Hamsterz Life (including the animals speaking, and the choice of mini-games).

== Reception ==
Reception

Aggregate score
Aggregator	Score
GameRankings	72%

Review scores
Publication	Score
GameZone	7.5/10
IGN	7/10
Jeuxvideo.com	10/20

A review in GameZone thought that the game was much better than the two previous Petz Game Boy Advance games—Dogz and Catz—but still did not hold up against Nintendogs. The reviewer for Jeuxvideo found that the hamsters of the game lacked depth. On the other hand, Lucas Thomas, of IGN, thought that the "unstoppable quirk" was the games greatest asset, and that it was "weird, off-the-wall, funny".
