= Animals in video games =

The depiction of animals in video games has echoed the wider symbolism of animals in culture. Games feature animals in roles ranging from NPC to companion and even protagonist. Animals are depicted with varying degrees of intelligence, from realistic to possessing human levels of self-awareness. They are considered crucial to worldbuilding. However, there are unique aspects and challenges to depicting animals within a game. The behavior and appearance of animals must be digitally recreated rather than simply recorded, a difficult task that may detract from other aspects of the game, leading to discussion on whether interactivity with animals should be prioritized. At the same time, many video game developers specifically seek to include animals in their games despite the additional work involved, sometimes due to personal interest in them.

Anthropomorphic animals are also common characters in fantasy and sci-fi games, including best-selling franchises such as Mario, The Legend of Zelda and Sonic the Hedgehog. Humans can identify with them as memorable characters while they allow for unique gameplay or plot developments stemming from their animal-inspired special powers, forms, or abilities - i.e., avian humanoids being able to fly, or reptilian humanoids possessing superhuman durability or strength. Their appearance may also simply serve a symbolic role, emphasizing their character traits in visual form.

== Use as NPCs ==
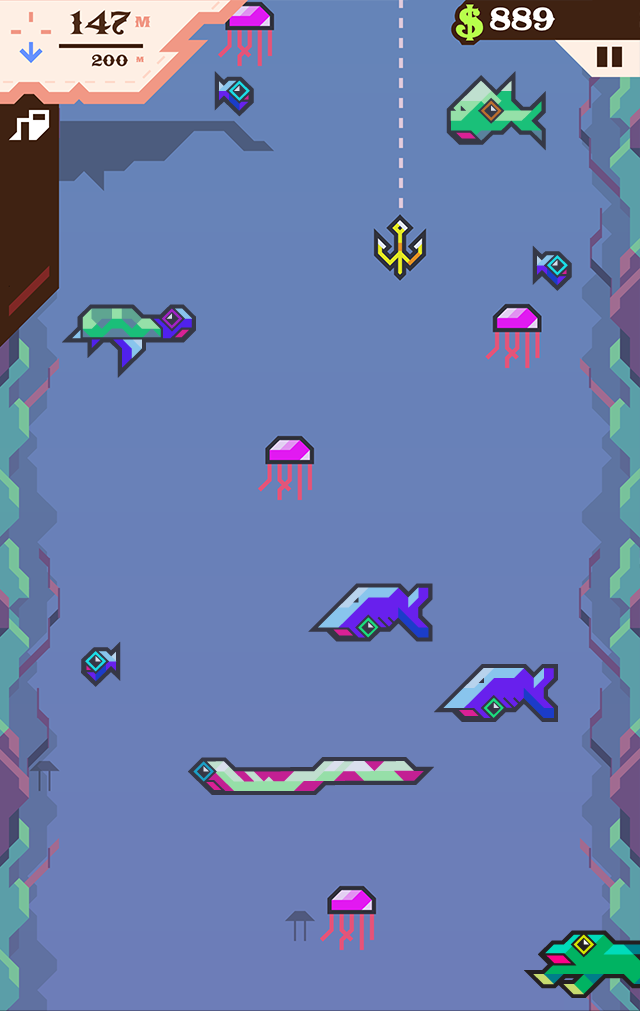
In Ridiculous Fishing (2013), fish are depicted as NPCs. The player must catch as many fish as possible.

Realistic-seeming animals in a video game world are seen as critical for building player immersion and a very important part of worldbuilding, as a lack of them can cause the level to appear dull and lifeless. This becomes even more important when the game is set in a natural environment. However, concessions are made to preserve a game's story and gameplay. For example, animals cannot be too skilled at hiding themselves or the player will have difficulty hunting them successfully, and they are typically restricted from entering certain places where they may disrupt important story moments.

Some people believe that different animals are held to different standards of coverage. Mark Delaney from GameSpot questioned the "wholesomeness" of Animal Crossing over the game's fishing mechanic, as hooking fish has been proven to cause them pain. In contrast, they praised the game Ooblets for going out of its way to avoid depicting any form of animal harm. Some people have also complained about hunting rare duiker in Cabela's Dangerous Hunts, as well as the level in Overlord 2 where the protagonist clubs baby seals.

The 2019 creation of Can You Pet the Dog?, a Twitter account listing whether dogs or other creatures can be pet, sparked an accompanying Internet meme of the same name, and a movement to add greater interactivity to in-game animals. The meme resulted in some game designers adding petting mechanics, sometimes at the expense of other elements of the game. In particular, the lack of dog-petting seen in The Legend of Zelda: Breath of the Wild prompted a large response from the community, causing IGN to do an interview with the game's director on why they cannot be petted.

== Use as companions ==
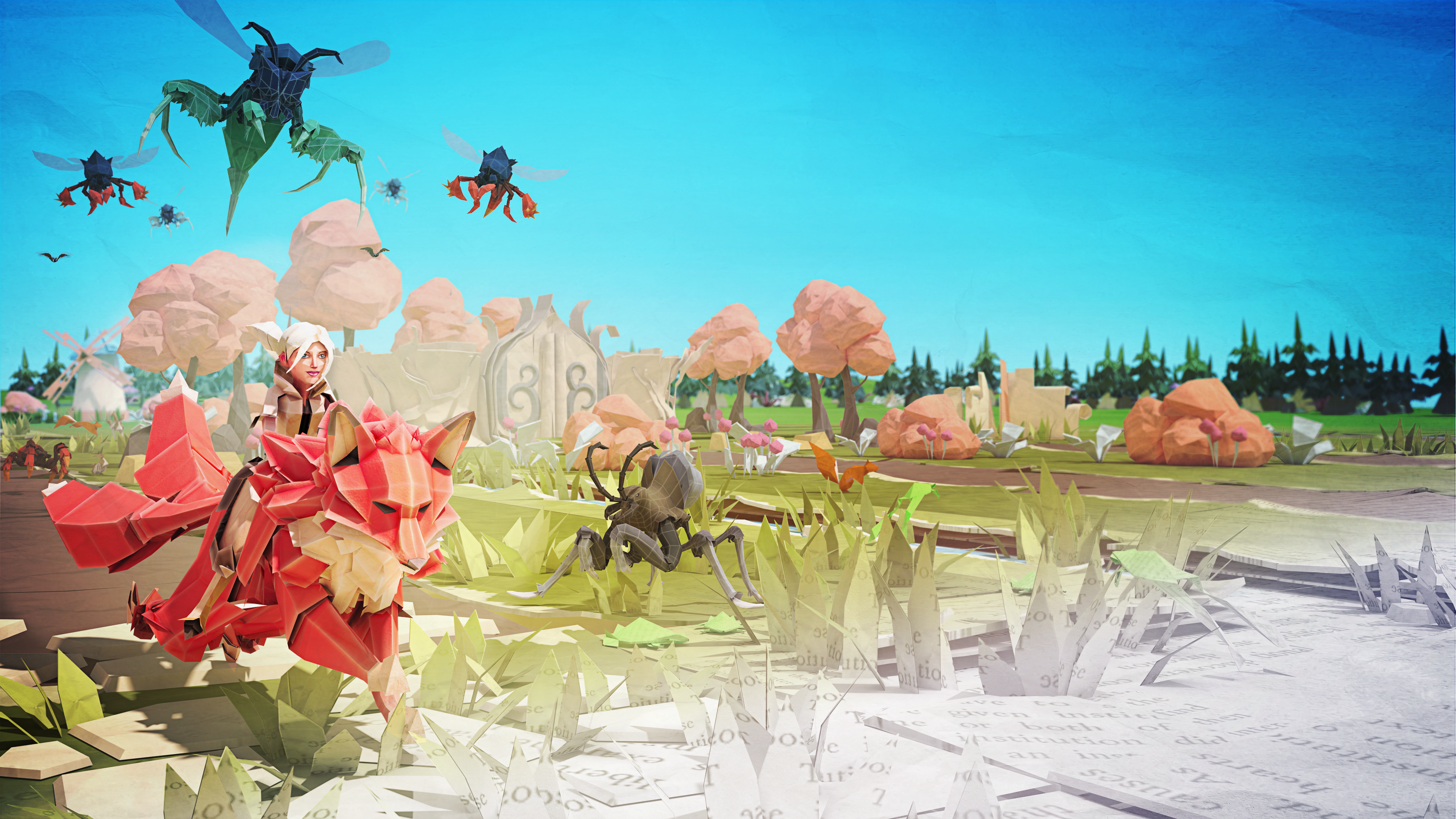
In Epistory (2016), the main character rides a giant fox, an example of an animal companion and mount.

One of the most common uses of animal companions in games is the concept of a mount, a rideable animal such as a horse that can be used to get quickly from one place to another. They are often used as glorified tools that are a similar part of the player's arsenal as weapons and armor. While still memorable companions, they immediately acquiesce to the player's demands while not requiring anything in return. They are also occasionally used in battles, like in the Pokémon series. The game Far Cry 6 received backlash for including a cockfighting minigame.

Pikachu, as it appears in Pokémon Yellow, has been named as one of the best video game animal companions. The character had "attitude", refusing to go into its Pokéball and attempting to bite the player if they pull on its tail.

In recent years, games began exploring the idea of animal autonomy, rather than simply having the player expect mindless obedience, reflecting evolving real-world views on animal rights. Examples include The Last Guardian (2016), in which Trico, an enormous griffin-like creature, may disobey the player and show "stubbornness". In The Legend of Zelda: Breath of the Wild (2017), unlike earlier games in the series, horses must be bonded with in order to unlock the ability to customize them or use them to their full potential. Critics such as horse video game expert Alice Ruppert have called for an increase in the care put into horse designs in video games, including behavior.

Virtual pet games revolve around animals that require similar care and attention as a real creature, and may even substitute for one, offering the feeling of pet ownership that one may not be able to experience in real life. The first virtual pet program, Dogz, was created in 1995, quickly followed by the Tamagotchi, which became a widespread fad. Nintendogs (2005) added significantly more realistic graphics and behavior. Modern virtual pet games include Neko Atsume (2014), in which the player collects cats that interact with various objects.

== Use as protagonists ==
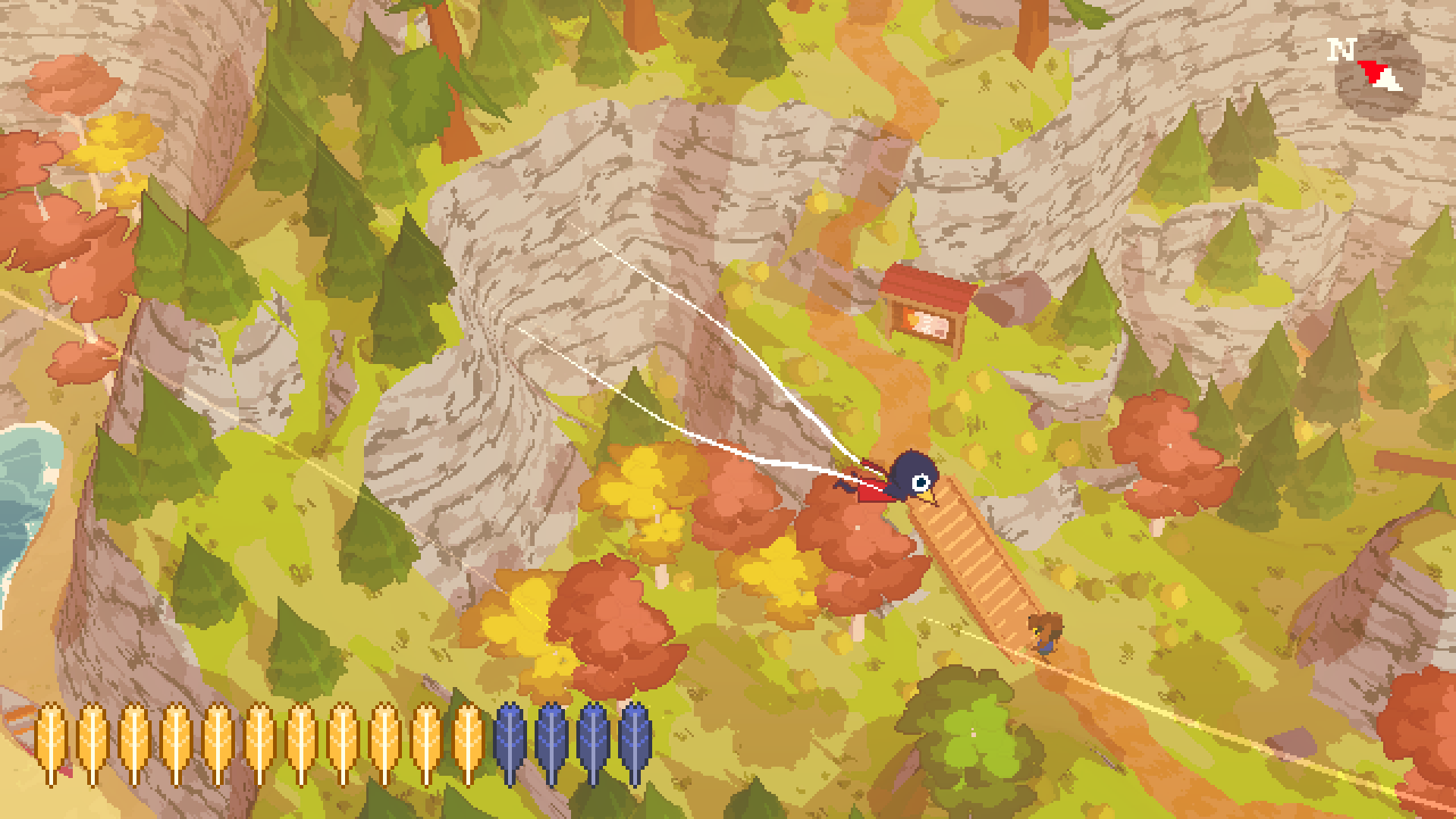
Claire, the protagonist of A Short Hike (2019), is an anthropomorphic bird, and can glide across areas.

Historically, most games featuring animals as protagonists anthropomorphized them with human-like behavior and speech, with Crash Bandicoot and Sonic the Hedgehog being famous examples. The stories of such games typically play out like those of human characters. A shapeshifting main character can allow for a compromise between human and animal gameplay, as shown in such games as The Legend of Zelda: Twilight Princess (2006) or Divinity II (2009).

Some games feature animals with realistic appearances but unrealistic behavior. Many of them feature dogs or cats as the main character, but other animals get starring roles as well. These animals include deer, wolves, sharks, and foxes. Examples of this type of animal game include Goat Simulator and Catlateral Damage.

However, a smaller group of games feature animals that exhibit relatively realistic behavior, including Stray (2022), a post-apocalyptic game about a cat that becomes lost in an abandoned city. These games often require significant attention to detail so that players are fully immersed.

== Animal rights activism ==
Video games that directly address animal cruelty, rights, or the harmful effects of the meat industry are very few in number, with critics considering it an issue with potential for discussion in the gaming realm. One exception is Dungeons of Dredmor (2011), which includes a vegan class that gives the player unique powers, but punishes them for harming animals of any kind. The animal rights group PETA has criticized games that in its eyes depict animal cruelty, such as Call of Duty: World at War and Battlefield 3, even extending into criticizing the harming of animal-like aliens such as the Zerg from Starcraft. Since 2001, the group has made a number of short satirical games, such as Super Tofu Boy, a parody of Super Meat Boy that they were baited into making by the game's developer himself, and Super Tanooki Skin 2D, a Mario parody, but these have been criticized by PC Gamer as relying too heavily on shock value and being developed in an opportunistic manner without showing legitimate interest in the gaming medium beyond use as a publicity tool.
