= Giga Pet =

Digital pet toys

Giga Pets
- Baby T-Rex (The Lost World) v2, released in 1997
- Type: Digital pet
- Invented by: REHCO LLC
- Company: Tiger Electronics (1997–1998); Hasbro (1998–2006); Top Secret Toys (2018–present)
- Country: United States
- Availability: 1997–present
- Official website

Giga Pets are digital pet toys that were first released by Tiger Electronics in the United States in 1997 in the midst of a virtual-pet toy fad. Available in a variety of different characters, each Giga Pet is a palm-sized unit with an LCD screen and attached key ring. To ensure a happy, healthy pet, its owner has to take care of it similar to how one might care for a real animal, including feeding, cleaning, and playing with their Giga Pet.

== Operation ==
Giga Pets are "born" on a tiny LCD screen after the owner pulls back a tab on the back. The pets come to life in different ways. For example, Baby T-Rex hatches from an egg. Compu Kitty is delivered by a stork. A beep sound and alert icon notify the owner that the pet requires attention. To determine what the Giga Pet needs, owners must scroll through various activities and push a button to select one. Activities include but are not limited to bathing, exercising, and disciplining the pet. Sometimes a selected activity is refused and the owner has to try a different one. A running score determines the pet's overall well-being; neglect leads to the pet's demise. The average life of a Giga Pet is 2 weeks but very healthy pets can live longer. When a Giga Pet dies it grows angel wings. When Giga Pets were initially tested, it was reported that the first thing most girls did was name their pets whereas most boys opted to discipline the digital creatures.

== History ==
Giga Pets were first created in 1995 (as "V-Pets") by Chicago Toy inventing firm REHCO LLC. Rehco quickly licensed the concept to Tiger Electronics and the product was later launched as Giga Pets. In 1996 Tamagotchi, egg-shaped virtual pets, were introduced in Japan by Bandai and were widely credited with initiating the virtual pet craze in the U.S., the UK, and other countries. In May 1997, Giga Pets debuted in the U.S. They were reported to be more readily available than Tamagotchis and at a price of approximately US$10, roughly $5 less than the suggested retail price for their Japanese counterpart. Three versions were initially available at the release, Digital Doggie, Compu Kitty, and Micro Chimp, and by the summer of 1997, three additional versions were released in order to appeal more to boys, Baby T-Rex (The Lost World: Jurassic Park), Virtual Alien, and Bit-Critter.

By September 1997, three new pets were introduced, Komputer Koala, Floppy Frog, and Salem the Cat (Sabrina the Teenage Witch). Shortly after, KFC hosted a special promotion in November 1997, which offered four new Giga Pets, DigiPooch, MicroPup, CyberKitty, and Bitty Kitty. These were identical to the Digital Doggie and Compu Kitty, but with new shell colors. Towards the end of 1997, a second edition of eight of the original Giga Pets was released with new clam designs and added animal sound effects. Additionally, two new Disney-themed pets, 101 Dalmatians and The Little Mermaid, were introduced. By the end of 1997, Tiger Electronics, a then privately held electronics toy and game-maker based in Vernon Hills, Illinois, was one of many manufacturers creating virtual pets. Others included Playmates Toys, Fujitsu, PF.Magic, Sega, Viacom New Media, Casio, and TechnoSphere.

In 1998, Tiger introduced two new series of Giga Pets, Giga Pets Plus and Giga Fighters. The Giga Pets Plus series allowed for having multiple pets within one toy. It consisted of Giga Circus, Giga Farm, Giga Pound, Looney Tunes, Rugrats, A Bug's Life, and Small Soldiers, with each one having multiple characters. The Giga Fighters series was geared more towards boys and consisted of six units with characters from different TV shows and movies, including Men in Black, Mortal Kombat, WCW/nWo, Batman & Robin, The Lost World, and Tech Warriors. Users could train their characters and connect their unit to another Giga Fighters unit in order to battle with friends. In addition to these two new series, Tiger also released several new pets as part of the standard Giga Pets line. The majority of the new pets were based on popular cartoons and movies. They consisted of Reptar (Rugrats), Yoda (Star Wars), R2-D2 (Star Wars), Rancor (Star Wars), Babe and Friends (Babe), Tweety (Looney Tunes), Tazmanian Devil (Looney Tunes), and Oreo Mouse (Oreo Cookies). Additionally, they released Precious Puppy (Barbie) and Precious Kitty (Barbie), which were identical to the Digital Doggie and Compu Kitty, but with pink shells. By the end of 1998, the virtual pet craze had mostly died down, and sales of virtual pets plunged nearly 80 percent in the United States.

== Giga Pets and Furby ==
Roger Shiffman, a Chicago native and co-founder of Tiger Electronics, is credited as being the driving force behind Giga Pets and Furby, a furry interactive pet with big eyes and pointed ears that could talk, shuffle, and sneeze. Intended to be a follow-up to Giga Pets, Shiffman included Furby in the deal he made with Hasbro when Tiger Electronics was sold to the giant toy manufacturer in 1998 for US$335 million. Approximately 20 million Furbies were sold in the first 6 months following its 1998 release.

== TV game system and new handhelds launched in 2006 ==
In 2006, Hasbro launched the Giga Pets Explorer TV game system and new Giga Pets handheld devices. The TV game system included three pets within the unit itself along with a separate handheld Giga Pet (Hamster) and sold for approximately US$40. Handhelds were sold in a 12-package assortment of characters as well as individually. The characters Pixie, Tomcat, Puffball, Dragon Lizard, Scorpion, and Bunny were all available individually at a suggested retail price of approximately US$15. The puppy character (Pup) was sold exclusively at Toys R Us. Gameplay on the handheld device consisted of feeding, playing with, bathing, and caring for your pet using various food items, toys, and medicines. These supplies could be replenished by having your pet visit the General Store are purchasing more supplies using in-game currency (Bucks). Bucks could be found by having your pet dig up hidden items from the ground. Much like a video game cartridge, the handheld Giga Pets unit could also be inserted into the TV game system, allowing users to see their pet on the TV.

== Controversy ==
Giga Pets, along with other virtual pets, were banned in some schools in different countries around the world including Iceland, Thailand, the U.S. and Canada primarily because they were deemed a distraction in the classroom. Common complaints included annoying beeping sounds and children's constant worry over their pets’ well-being. Some parents felt Giga Pets were an ideal learning toy that taught children responsibility. Others worried their kids were becoming too attached.

Beyond the classroom, Giga Pets and their kind inspired debate over the implications of caring for virtual pets versus biological pets. Some people thought the on/off/reset switch implied to children that death wasn't final and many people, some animal rights activists among them, believed that virtual pets taught children that caring for an animal was a matter of convenience.

In a Journal of American and Comparative Cultures article published in 2000, author, David W. Kritt, discussed the impact virtual pets had on young females in terms of gender stereotypes. Kritt claimed, “The implicit message to the predominantly female owners is that an emotional meaningful relationship is simply care and dependence. In contrast, flesh and blood pets provide mutuality, a relatively exclusive and enduring affection, and often some self-enhancing function.” Kritt went on to address the impact of virtual pets on girls and technology. He wrote: “Despite McLuhan’s trenchant insight that the medium is the message, the virtual pet may not be so much a point of entry intro cyberspace for girls as it is a promoter of traditional values.” Kritt argued that this message is amplified when a child's parent, particularly her mother, focuses on helping the daughter keep the virtual pet alive.

== See also ==
- Digital Monster (virtual pet)
- Digital pet
- Tamagotchi
