= Babyz =

1999 video game

Babyz: Your Virtual Bundle of Joy
- Developer: PF.Magic
- Publisher: Mindscape
- Designer: Andrew Stern
- Platform: Windows
- Release: 1999

Babyz: Your Virtual Bundle of Joy is a computer game in which one can play with and take care of a group of babies who live in a virtual house on the computer. The game was released in 1999 by The Learning Company and developed by PF.Magic.

== Gameplay ==
Players can teach their Babyz how to talk, how to play with objects, and how to walk. Babyz can form relationships with other babyz that can result in sibling rivalries or friendships. At release, there were 15 babyz the players could adopt and care for, as well as various toys that babyz could interact with. There are different rooms to explore and numerous clothing items. Babyz reused some of the Petz toyz and had a similar home setting for its play scenes.

== Development ==
PF Magic, built Babyz on the existing engine used for the Catz and Dogz games, using many of the systems of those games. The voice recognition in the game was provided by IBM's ViaVoice.

== Reception ==
Reception

Review scores
Publication	Score
AllGame	3.5/5 stars
Electronic Games	2/5 stars

Nnedi Okorafor felt that while the game its self was "cute and innocent", the concept of the game—and how it seemed to treat babies like pets—was off-putting.

== Related titles ==
- Petz
- Oddballz
