= National Geographic Panda =

2008 video game

- North American box art
- Developer: Namco Bandai Games
- Publisher: Namco Bandai Games
- Platform: Nintendo DS
- Release: NA: November 2008
- Genre: Virtual pets
- Mode: Single-player

National Geographic Panda is a pet simulation game developed and published by Namco Bandai Games for the Nintendo DS. It was licensed by National Geographic. The game is about raising a panda cub. It was released in Europe as Petz: My Baby Panda, as part of the Petz series.

== Gameplay ==
The game focuses on the player raising their own panda. The player gets a set allowance each day to buy water, food and toys for their panda. The player uses the touch screen to interact with their pandas. They can also go to the Panda House, which has over twenty National Geographic articles about pandas.

== Release ==
Namco Bandai announced the game at an event in April 2008. They released it in November 2008. It was sold with a bonus DVD, which contained a copy of the 1994 National Geographic Special, Secrets of the Wild Panda.

== Reception ==
Reception

Review score
Publication	Score
Nintendo World Report	7/10

Carmine Red of Nintendo World Report praised the game's graphics. However, she also criticized the game for its repetitiveness.
