= GT Cube =

2003 video game

- Nissan 350Z
- Developer: MTO
- Publisher: MTO
- Series: GT
- Platform: GameCube
- Release: JP: June 20, 2003
- Genre: Racing
- Modes: Single-player, multiplayer

GT Cube is a racing game sequel to GT Advance 3: Pro Concept Racing released in 2003 by MTO for GameCube. The game was re-released as GT Pro Series for Wii in 2006.

== Reception ==
Tyrone Rodriguez, in a 2003 import review for IGN focused on informing potential importers "what kind of Japanese walls they may run into while playing and" if purchasing is recommended, highlighted that "very little, if any, understanding of Japanese menu systems is necessary since most of the information is displayed in both" Japanese and English. Rodriguez commented that GT Cube has "the look and art style of Capcom's Auto Modellista" with the "basic gameplay and theme from Gran Turismo", however, he criticized the graphic which failed at cel shading and has "the look of a N64 game circa 1999". He noted while there are few racing games on the GameCube, it was not worth "the hefty import price" except for the "super hardcore racing fan who lives, eats and breathes this stuff". Steven Rodriguez of Nintendo World Report rated the game a 6/10 overall, highlighting that the cel-shaded "effect isn't as dramatic as in Capcom's Auto Modellista" and the cars have a "pleasing look". However, the nice "cel-shading and licensed cars" is "really the only true positive in a game filled with mediocrity". He commented that while there is "some fun in this racing game", "unless you can tolerate some major annoyances, don't bother importing".
