= MTO (video game company) =

Japanese video game developer

- Industry: Video games
- Founded: May 28, 1996; 30 years ago
- Headquarters: Yokohama, Japan
- Number of employees: 5
- Website: Official website

MTO Co., Ltd. (エム・ティー・オー株式会社) ("Motorsports Software Technical Office") is a Yokohama-based video game developer and publisher founded on May 28, 1996. The company is mostly known for the GT series of racing games that it has released (GT Advance Championship Racing, GT Pro Series) and the more recent pet games such as Dogz and Catz.

== History ==
The company was founded 1996 with the initial focus of developing and publish racing games.

== Games developed ==
Year	Title	System	Publisher
1998	Option Tuning Car Battle	PS	MTO
1998	Naniwa Wangan Battle	PS	MTO
1998	Initial D Gaiden	GB	Kodansha
1999	Option Tuning Car Battle 2	PS	Jaleco
1999	Pocket GT	GBC	Interplay
2000	Option Tuning Car Battle Spec-R	PS	MTO
2001	GT Advance Championship Racing	GBA	THQ
2001	Nakayoshi Pet Advance Series: Kawaii Hamster	GBA	
2002	GT Advance 2: Rally Racing	GBA	THQ
2002	GT Advance 3: Pro Concept Racing	GBA	THQ
2002	Daisuki Teddy	GBA	
2002	Nakayoshi Pet Advance Series 2: Kawaii Inu	GBA	
2002	Nakayoshi Pet Advance Series 3: Kawaii Neko (Re-released outside of Japan as "Catz" in 2006)	GBA	Ubisoft (Outside of Japan)
2003	Chesti to Meigurumi-tachi no Mahou no Bouken: Kisekko Gurumii	GBA	
2003	GT Cube	GameCube	MTO
2003	Dancing Sword Senkou	GBA	
2003	Nakayoshi Pet Advance Series 4: Kawaii Inu Mini ~ Wanko to Asobou!!	GBA	
2003	Mahou no Pumpkin ~Ann to Greg no Daibouken~	GBA; PS; GC	
2004	Oshare Wanko (Re-released outside of Japan as "Dogz Fashion" in 2006)	GBA	Ubisoft (Outside of Japan)
2004	Kawaii Koinu Wonderful (Re-released outside of Japan as "Dogz" in 2006)	GBA	Ubisoft (Outside of Japan)
2004	Wanko de Kururin! WanKuru	GBA	
2005	Fossil League: Dino Tournament Championship	DS	D3 Publisher
2006	GT Pro Series	Wii	MTO; Ubisoft
2006	Hamsterz Life	DS	Ubisoft
2006	Horsez	DS; PS2; PC; GBA	
2007	Ocha-Ken no Heya DS (Localized outside of Japan as "Dogz 2")	DS	Ubisoft (Outside of Japan)
2007	Edamoto Nahomi no Shiawase Kitchen (Localized as "Imagine: Master Chef")	DS	Ubisoft (Outside of Japan)
2007	Oshare na Koinu DS (Localized as "Petz: Dogz Fashion")	DS	Ubisoft (Outside of Japan)
2007	Kyouryuu Ikusei Battle RPG: Kyouryuu Monster	DS	
2008	Koinu de Kururin	DS	
2008	Kawaii Koneko DS	DS	
2008	Koinu no Heya	DS	
2008	Kawaii Koinu DS 2	DS	
2008	Minna de Asobou! Wanko de Kururin	WiiWare	
2009	Kawaii Koneko DS 2	DS	
2009	KURULIN FUSION	PSP	
2009	Rilakkuma Minna de Goyururi Seikatsu	Wii	MTO
2010	Kawaii Koinu DS 3	DS	
2010	Kawaii Koneko DS 3	DS	
2011	Wappy Dog	DS	Sega Toys Activision
2011	Kawaii Koinu 3D	3DS	
2012	Koinu to Asobou	3DS	
2013	Oshare na Koinu 3D	3DS	
2013	Koneko no Album ~MyLittleCat~	3DS	
2014	Shunsoku Mezase! Zenkoku Saikyou Runner	3DS	

== Cancelled games ==
- ActiveDogs

== Games published ==
Year	Title	System	Developer
1998	Option Tuning Car Battle	PS	MTO; CAPS Inc.
2000	Option Tuning Car Battle Spec-R	PS	MTO; CAPS Inc.
2002	MotoGP	GBA	Visual Impact
2003	Castleween	PS2; GameCube; GBA	Wanadoo Edition
2003	GT Cube	GameCube	MTO
2006	GT Pro Series	Wii	MTO; Ubisoft
