= Ballz =

1994 video game

Ballz 3D
- European Mega Drive box art
- Developer: PF.Magic
- Publishers: NA/EU: Accolade, Inc.; JP: Media Rings
- Platforms: Genesis/Mega Drive, Super NES, 3DO
- Release: Genesis/Mega Drive: EU: September 23, 1994; NA: October 5, 1994; Super NES: NA: November 18, 1994; JP: April 28, 1995; 3DO: NA: 1995
- Genre: Fighting
- Modes: Single-player, multiplayer

Ballz 3D (originally subtitled Fighting at Its Ballziest in North America and The Battle of the Balls in Europe) is a 1994 fighting game developed by PF.Magic and published by Accolade for the Sega Genesis and Super Nintendo Entertainment System, with a 3DO version being released as a director's cut in 1995. The game offers three difficulty levels over a total of 21 matches. Its distinguishing quality was that each of the characters were composed completely of spheres, giving the game a pseudo-3D look. Although the game was not a major success, it was generally well-received by critics, and PF.Magic reused its graphics technology in the Petz line of virtual pet titles (Dogz, Catz and Oddballz).

== Development and publishing ==
The idea to use spheres to represent characters in the game was proposed by lead programmer Keith Kirby; the development team decided on implementing the idea as it would save processor power, as well as the fact that characters would look the same regardless of the angle the camera is situated at when they are constructed from spheres, which are also relatively quite easy to represent in the game's code.

The Genesis/Mega Drive version was originally intended for use with the Edge 16, a modem system for multiplayer gaming which was eventually cancelled.

The opening PF.Magic developed for the game stated "To be the champion, you gotta have Ballz!". Due to its racy double-entendre ("balls" may be used as a slang term for testicles), Nintendo demanded the wording be changed for the SNES version. The SNES version of the game states "...you gotta play Ballz", while the Sega version uses the original intro. The game was also notably bizarre for its lineup of fighters, which included a farting monkey, a jumping clown, a sumo wrestler, an ostrich, a caveman, a bodybuilder, a ballerina, a rhinoceros, and a "superhero".

== Fighters ==
These are the characters in the game's lineup of fighters:

- Boomer: A clown from the circus. His air jumps and the tricks up his sleeves make him the most humorous fighter.
- Bruiser: A bodybuilder who gets quite a workout. His buffed-up body and powerful blows make him a formidable fighter.
- Crusher: An enraged rhinoceros who prefers to charge at his opponents directly.
- Divine: A ballerina dancer who twirls around gracefully. She's the only female fighter and will sometimes give a spanking.
- Kronk: A caveman from the dawn of civilization. He uses his club to cut his opponents down to size and hits them like a baseball.
- Tsunami: A sumo wrestler who enjoys leaping on top of his opponents.
- Turbo: A superhero who glides along the arena and blows as strongly as a hurricane.
- Yoko: A monkey who often breaks wind. He enjoys ganging up on the opponent and slapping them silly.
- Zombie: Only appears in the Director's Cut version of the game. He stalks and slashes at his enemies.

== Bosses ==
These are the bosses who appear in One-Player mode. Each boss defeated earns a different colored belt, and these change the fighter's coloring scheme.

- Guggler: The first boss in the game. Guggler is an ostrich who pecks at her opponents and tosses them around with her beak. Her "jump and kick" ability also makes her a boss to be reckoned with. Defeating her wins the Red Belt.
- Bounder: The second boss of the game. Bounder is a kangaroo who wears boxing gloves and uses punches and kicks. He often jumps around and balances on his tail while using his legs to fling opponents across the arena. Defeating him wins the Green Belt.
- T-Wrecks: The third boss in the game. T-Wrecks is a gigantic dinosaur who relies on an aggressive temperament as an attack. He will grab opponents in his jaws and creates devastating ground shock waves with a powerful tail. Defeating him wins the Blue Belt.
- Lamprey: The fourth boss of the game. Lamprey is a mystical genie whose swift attacks and magical powers make him a formidable foe. He possesses the ability to turn himself into any creature, such as a bull, a scorpion, or a snake. Defeating him wins the Black Belt.
- The Jester: The ultimate boss. The Jester is the one who challenged the fighters to duel in the tournament at the start. He dons a black-and-white outfit and can be seen juggling balls in the opening. As the final boss, he is the most difficult character to beat. He can disassemble himself and move about the floor, and has physical attacks that are very strong. The damage he does can take off much of the player's health. After being defeated for the first time, he reassembles and comes back for more. When the Jester finally falls, he grants the fighter's wish - to play as the bosses.

== Reception ==
Reception

Review scores
Publication	Score
Computer and Video Games	3DO: 71/100; SMD: 87/100
Electronic Gaming Monthly	8/10, 7/10, 6/10, 6/10 (SNES)
Famitsu	SNES: 28/40
GameFan	SMD: 81/100 (Note: In GameFan's review of the Genesis version, two critics scored it 80/100, another 82/100.)
GamesMaster	SMD: 79% SNES: 58%
Joystick	3DO 68/100
Mean Machines Sega	SMD: 91/100
Mega Fun	SMD: 63%
Next Generation	3DO: 2/5
Total!	SNES: 69%
Video Games (DE)	SMD: 81%
3DO Magazine	3DO: 3/5
Electronic Games	SMD: C+
Entertainment Weekly	SMD: A
Mega	SMD: 80%
Mega Zone	SMD: 65%
Sega Magazine	SMD: 71/100

Electronic Gaming Monthly gave the Genesis version a 6.2 out of 10 average, commenting that "The fighters were interesting, with their various taunts and other poses, and the whole idea is innovative, but in the end it just never really came together for me." GamePro gave the Genesis version a positive review. They praised the balanced gameplay, smooth scaling effects, and humorous sound effects, and concluded, "Ballz takes the increasingly routine genre of fighting games and gives it a new bounce, injecting a wicked sense of humor into the action." They were less enthusiastic about the SNES version, saying that the graphics are better than in the Genesis version, but the irritating new soundtrack, overcomplicated control configuration, and especially the frequent slowdown combine to make the game much less enjoyable. The four reviewers of Electronic Gaming Monthly had mixed reactions to the SNES version. Two of them praised its original design and good graphics, and the other two praised the humorous sounds, but all but one felt the game was not as enjoyable as other fighting games, with the biggest problem being the fighters' limited set of moves. They gave it a 6.75 out of 10 average.

GamePro gave the 3DO version a highly positive review, applauding the additions and improvements such as enhanced graphics, increased play speed, rendered backgrounds, new character, character-specific theme songs, and arena rotation, as well as the humor and "non-conformist attitude" of the game itself.

Ballz was ranked seventh in a 2011 list of "Top Ten Fighting Games We'd Like to Forget", compiled by Game Informer. The author of the list, Dan Ryckert, criticized it for its sexual innuendo and its design representing more of a 2D look.

Next Generation reviewed the 3DO version of the game, rating it two stars out of five, and stated that "If you accept its looks, it plays fine, but this is as much yesterday's technology as any sprite-based fighter attempting to get away with digitized characters. It's almost too bad, but it's just a game out of time."
