= GT Pro Series =

2006 racing game

- PAL box art featuring a Nissan GT-R
- Developer: MTO
- Publishers: JP: MTO; WW: Ubisoft
- Series: GT
- Platform: Wii
- Release: NA: November 19, 2006; AU: December 7, 2006; EU: December 8, 2006; JP: January 11, 2007
- Genre: Racing
- Modes: Single-player, multiplayer

GT Pro Series (Note: Japanese: ジーティー・プロシリーズ, Hepburn: Jī Tī Puro Shirīzu) is a racing video game developed by MTO. It was originally released by Ubisoft as a launch title for the Wii in North America, in Europe and Australia in December 2006 and Japan by MTO in 2007. It includes over 80 licensed Japanese cars, next-gen physics and many gameplay modes, including Championship, Quick Race, Time Attack, Versus (4 players), Drift, and Replay. The game uses a cel-shaded style. Critics found the graphics underwhelming.

== Gameplay ==
GT Pro Series features eighty Japanese cars from various companies, including Honda, Subaru, Toyota, and Nissan. The tracks are in the same vein as those found in the Gran Turismo series of games, but are of a less overall graphical quality.

The game features cel-shaded cars driving in more realistic settings.

=== Wii Steering Wheel ===
As with Monster 4x4: World Circuit, a steering wheel shell for the Wii Remote is bundled with the game. The peripheral steering wheel is created by Thrustmaster. Other games, such as Mario Kart Wii, which are controlled by turning (but not tilting) the Wii Remote can be used with this peripheral as well.

== Development ==
Ubisoft purchased the rights to publish the game outside Japan on August 3, 2006. By September, GameSpot was able to get a glimpse of the game through a small video demo, reporting that though the cars looked cartoonish, they still had a certain realistic flair to them. A few weeks later, GameSpot looked at the game again, and walked away "impressed with the controls." IGN also looked in-depth at the game, commenting on the high quality of the control schemes. Both sites later gave poor marks to the game in their reviews of the final product.

== Reception ==
Reception

Aggregate score
Aggregator	Score
Metacritic	41/100

Review scores
Publication	Score
Eurogamer	2/10
Famitsu	25/40
GamePro	1.5/5
GameSpot	5.1/10
GameSpy	2/5
GameZone	3.9/10
IGN	4/10
Nintendo Power	5/10
Nintendo World Report	3/10
Official Nintendo Magazine	40%

GT Pro Series received "generally unfavorable reviews" according to video game review aggregator website Metacritic. In Japan, Famitsu gave it a score of one six, two sevens and one five, for a total of 25 out of 40.

GameSpot criticized the game's graphics and audio, writing, "The visual presentation in GT Pro Series looks like something from the Nintendo 64 era, and the sound isn't any better." IGN denounced the gameplay, stating, "GT Pro Series feels like a quick cash-out title, and Wii players deserve better." Eurogamer pointed out how the game shows serious problems for any future serious racers on the Wii, while commenting that the game itself was "absolutely, unequivocally, shockingly awful."

== See also ==
- GT Cube
