= Catlateral Damage =

First-person video game

- Title screen of v1.0.8 release
- Developers: Manekoware, Fire Hose Games
- Engine: Unity
- Platforms: Windows, OS X, Linux, Ouya, Razer Forge TV, PlayStation 4, HTC Vive, Xbox One, Xbox Series X and S
- Release: Web (Prototype): WW: 10 August 2013; Windows, OS X, Linux: WW: 27 May 2015; OUYA: NA: 11 June 2015; Razer Forge TV: NA: 18 February 2016; PlayStation 4: NA: 22 March 2016; EU: 13 June 2016; JP: 13 October 2016; HTC Vive: WW: 27 May 2016; PlayStation VR: WW: 13 October 2016
- Genre: Action
- Mode: Single-player

Catlateral Damage is a 2013 first-person video game in which the player plays as a cat. The goal of the game is to knock as many of the player character's owner's belongings onto the floor as possible. There are game modes in which the player can race against the clock and get a certain number of items onto the floor as fast as they can, score as many points as possible in two minutes, or play freely with no clock and no points.

== Development ==
The original version of Catlateral Damage was created for the August 2013 7DFPS game jam. Development for a full release began in September 2013.

On 13 January 2014, Catlateral Damage was released on Steam's "Steam Greenlight" service. There was a Kickstarter campaign for the game that ran between 16 June 2014 and 11 July 2014. The full version of the game was released on Steam on 27 May 2015. A "Remeowstered" version was released in September 2021 for platforms including Xbox One and the Series consoles.

== Release and reception ==
Reception

Aggregate score
Aggregator	Score
Metacritic	PS4: 57/100

=== Original release ===
Catlateral Damage received mixed to positive reviews upon release.

The original release of Catlateral Damage created for the 7DFPS game jam.

BuzzFeed's Joseph Bernstein reviewed the original Catlateral Damage favorably citing "If you have ever wanted to know what it is like to be a little feline menace, this is your chance."

Kotaku's Luke Plunkett reviewed the original Catlateral Damage as "as accurate a cat simulator as you'll ever play."

Rock, Paper, Shotgun's Nathan Grayson reviewed the original Catlateral Damage as "basic and inconsequential as can be, and that's exactly what I wanted from it. Be a cat. Do total jerkstore asshole cat things. The end."

=== Alpha release ===
CNET's Michelle Starr reviewed the alpha release of Catlateral Damage as "kind of really fun."

Indie Statik's Chris Priestman reviewed the alpha release of Catlateral Damage as "a fun little game about making a mess. What's not to love?"

Joystiq's Danny Cowan reviewed the alpha release of Catlateral Damage favorably with "For anyone who has never owned cats, this is a fairly accurate simulation of what their day-to-day life entails."

VG247's Mike Irving reviewed the alpha release of Catlateral Damage as "small and rough at the moment" but found the game "entertaining."
