= Petz: Crazy Monkeyz =

2008 video game

Crazy Monkeyz
- Developer: Y'sK
- Publisher: Ubisoft
- Platform: Wii
- Release: NA: November 18, 2008
- Genre: Virtual life
- Mode: Single-player

Petz: Crazy Monkeyz (sometimes called simply Crazy Monkeyz) is a sim game, in the Petz series developed by Y'sK and published by Ubisoft and released for the Wii on November 18, 2008.

== Gameplay ==
Crazy Monkeyz is a sim game designed for 1 player and revolving around caring for a monkey.

To start the players can choose from two species of monkey (with 8 more species being unlockable), each has three coat types to choose from but the players will be unable to see the other two. From there they can feed their own monkey, play with it, teach it tricks, dress it up, breed it, or turn on the TV for it (plays a non-stop commercial for the game).

== Reception ==
Reception

Aggregate score
Aggregator	Score
GameRankings	35%

Review score
Publication	Score
IGN	3.5/10

The game has received largely negative reviews.
