= Pippa Funnell: Take the Reins =

2006 video game

Pippa Funnell: Take The Reins
- Developer(s): Lexis Numerique
- Publisher(s): Ubisoft
- Series: Alexandra Ledermann / Pippa Funnel
- Platform(s): PlayStation 2, Windows
- Release: EU: October 27, 2006
- Genre(s): Strategy

Pippa Funnell 2: Take the Reins (released as Alexandra Ledermann: L'Ecole des Champions in France, and Champion Dreams: First to Ride in North America) is a horse riding simulation game developed by French studio Lexis Numerique and released by Ubisoft on October 27, 2006 for the PlayStation 2 and Windows. The player takes the role of Jade as she attends the Sycamore Riding School in Scotland. Throughout the game, the player is able to train, care for, and compete with their horse while interacting with the other students in the Academy, and solving a mystery.

The game is named after famous horse riders in Europe: Pippa Funnell (Great Britain) and Alexandra Ledermann (France), and is part of a series of games.

== Gameplay ==
To begin the game, the player must choose a name for themselves and select the horse they will use. There are many breeds to choose from, as well as colours, but none have impact on performance. After the horse is named, the story begins with Jade on her way to the Academy. Throughout the game, the students and Jade travel to the USA and Morocco to train and compete against other riding schools.

The player (as Jade) must take "classes" to progress through the week, with a competition to prepare for each weekend. Training for each riding discipline (dressage, show-jumping, and cross-country) and horse care must be done at least twice each week, in addition to maintaining a high social rating by interacting with the other students and wearing stylish clothes.

Occasionally, an event may take place that overrides the class chosen. In these events the player may be helped by a "voice" with the name Elsys. The player should be mindful to do required activities earlier in the week to ensure they are completed before the competition. If the player does not score high enough in one or more of the required activities, the week must be repeated.

== Activities/Classes ==
Horse Care: The player is able to care for their horse by mucking the stall, picking the hoofs, bathing, and grooming him. It is best to complete this activity 4-5 times per week to maintain the best happiness levels for the horse.

Foal Care: After obtaining the foal, it must be cared for. The foal will perform three actions, and the player must give the foal what it needs based on them. The player can find clues about what each action means by reading books in the library.

Cross-Country: The player rides their horse through an outdoor, long-distance jumping course than uses solid objects, such as fencing or logs, as jumps. The event is timed, with a time-limit, and the rider with the fewest faults and fastest time wins. When approaching a jump, wait for the circle in front to turn green, then press the spacebar (X button for PlayStation 2) to attempt the jump. If the circle is not green, or the jump is approached at an angle, the horse will refuse, resulting in faults and lost time. Too many refusals and the rider will be disqualified.

Show-Jumping: This takes place in the arena, using jumps that will fall if knocked. Similar to cross-country, faults are given for refusals and knocking down rails, and the event is timed. Instead of circles in front of the jumps, there is a bar that changes from red to green. Approach the jump straight and press the spacebar (X button) when the bar is green coloured to clear the jump.

Dressage: Use the arrow keys to follow the path on the ground, while maintaining the correct gait. In the first few weeks, it is recommended that the player read the dressage books in the library to learn how to perform the different maneuvers required in later weeks.

Walk: The player takes their horse out for a trail ride, and can explore the grounds around the Academy, or the local areas while abroad. There is no time limits or other requirements, but it will improve the horse's happiness. It can be helpful to use this activity to become somewhat familiar with each area, as later events in the game can take place there.

Rest Room: This activity is for raising popularity with the other students by talking with them. The player can talk to two students (or one student twice) each time this activity is chosen. Use this time to learn about each student's personality and other helpful tips for the mystery part of the game.

Bedroom: The player can change their clothes (casual, and for each riding event) as well as their horse's equipment to try to earn more popularity points. Jade has a laptop that may also be used for research and online shopping. Websites can be found throughout the game.

Library: Here the player can read up on dressage moves or how to care for their horse and foal.

Competitions: At the end of each week, a competition is held that the player must perform well at to get the best ending. There are three rounds to each competition: dressage, cross-country, and show-jumping. Each event's scores are added together to produce an overall standing. Each week features different courses, increasing in difficulty as the games progresses.

== Characters ==
Jade: The main character that the player controls. She has short red hair, grey eyes, and freckles. She has a strong personality, but is overall friendly and kind.

Spike: Male with spikey blonde hair. He has a bit of a dangerous background, and is only at the Academy because of his parents. A bit of a rebel, he doesn't hold back what he wants to say.

Ginger: Female with long blonde hair and fair skin. She is fun-loving but strong enough to deal with the others.

Esteban: Spanish male with short black hair, blue eyes, and tanned skin. He has a gentle and welcoming personality and likes to dress with a bit of class.

Kiew: Asian female with long black hair. She is very competitive and takes every chance she can to race the others, either on horseback or in the swimming pool. She does not like to be defeated.

Director: The director of the academy, He has balding white hair and mustache and beard. He appears at the beginning of the game and before competitions.

Harry: Short white hair and mustache/beard. He is a bit gruff, but instructs the students on how to properly care for their horses.

== Sequels ==
There are two direct sequels to this game: Pippa Funnell 3: Golden Stirrup Challenge (Horsez in North America), and Pippa Funnell 4: Secrets of the Ranch (Horsez 2). In Golden Stirrup Challenge, the player attends Jade's new riding school as a new character Flora. In Secrets of the Ranch, Flora owns a farm that the player works at as another new character Emma.
