= GT Advance 3: Pro Concept Racing =

2002 video game

- North American cover art featuring a Honda NSX
- Developer: MTO
- Publishers: JP: MTO; WW: THQ
- Series: GT Advance
- Platform: Game Boy Advance
- Release: JP: April 26, 2002; NA: February 4, 2003; EU: May 23, 2003
- Genre: Racing
- Modes: Single-player, multiplayer

GT Advance 3: Pro Concept Racing (Note: Known in Japan as Advance GT 2 (アドバンスGT2, Adobansu GT Tsū)) is a racing game developed by MTO and published by THQ for the Game Boy Advance. It is the sequel to GT Advance 2: Rally Racing, based heavily on the gameplay from GT Advance Championship Racing, and the third game in the GT Advance series.

== Gameplay ==
The game reportedly mixes the first two games of the series—it has the city environments and paved streets of the first game, but the physics engine is slippery, much like the second, and allows more leeway with collisions, changing the strategy drastically from the original GT Advance. There are 97 cars available, unlocked by playing through each mode, and all are upgradeable. Also added to the game is the "Drift Combo" mode, in which the player needs to chain drifts a certain number of times within a lap limit to unlock a new car.

== Development ==
GT Advance 3: Pro Concept Racing was first announced in November 2002 to be under development. The following year in February, THQ released updated information regarding the game along with screenshots, showing the game's increased graphical power over its predecessors.

== Reception ==
Reception

Aggregate score
Aggregator	Score
Metacritic	74/100

Review scores
Publication	Score
Famitsu	29/40
Game Informer	7.25/10
GamePro	3/5
GamesMaster	82%
GameSpot	8.1/10
GameSpy	4/5
GameZone	7/10
IGN	8.5/10
Nintendo Power	3.9/5
X-Play	3/5

The game received "average" reviews according to the review aggregation website Metacritic. GameSpot called GT Advance 3: Pro Concept Racing as a spicier version of the original GT Advance that was released when the Game Boy Advance launched in June 2001. IGN was also positive of the game, but noted that other Game Boy Advance games like Colin McRae Rally 2.0 and Moto Racer Advance have better graphics systems. In Japan, Famitsu gave it a score of 29 out of 40.
