= Ocha-Ken =

Japanese toy line

- DVD cover of Ocha-ken: Ryokutto Monogatari

お茶犬
- Anime television series

Ocha-Ken: Chokotto Monogatari
- Studio: Teahouse
- Original network: Kids Station
- Original run: October 6, 2003 – March 29, 2004
- Episodes: 26
- Anime television series

Ocha-Ken: Hotto Monogatari
- Studio: Teahouse
- Original network: Kids Station
- Original run: January 16, 2006 – April 10, 2006
- Episodes: 13
- Anime television series

Ocha-Ken: Ryokutto Monogatari
- Studio: Teahouse
- Original network: Kids Station
- Original run: November 22, 2008 – February 21, 2009
- Episodes: 13

Ocha-Ken (お茶犬) is a toy line and media franchise created by Sega Toys and Horipro in 2002. The name means "tea puppy" in Japanese, and most of the characters have tea leaves for ears. An animated series was produced in 2003, and multiple video games for Nintendo handheld systems have also been released, primarily developed by MTO.

== Characters ==
The characters are dogs themed around different types of tea.

- Ryoku: A green tea-themed dog who is laid-back. He was born on May 2nd and he enjoys sunbathing.
- Aru: A red black tea-themed dog. He has a strong sense of justice and can only be seen by people who work hard.
- Ron: A black oolong-themed dog with golden ears. He has a cool personality and can only be seen by the innocent.
- Hana: A pink herbal tea-themed dog. She is the only female in the main cast and can only be seen by kind people.
- Chai: A cream masala chai-themed dog. He has a spoiled personality and can only be seen by lonely people.
- Cafe: A brown coffee-themed dog. He can only be seen by mature people.
- Muha: A tan barely tea-themed teadog. He seems to be quite clumsy, but also very loyal to his friends.

== Toys ==
The tea-scented Ocha-Ken toys were the original product of the brand, released by Sega Toys in collaboration with Horipro in 2002.

There are also cat characters known as Ocha-Neko. In 2007, a new group of characters based on various desserts, entitled "Ocha-Ken Sweets", was introduced. Special toys have been released as a bonus when purchasing certain bottled teas.

== Animated series ==
The Ocha-Ken animated series aired from October 2003 to March 2004 on Kids Station and was aimed at a younger audience. There are 26 episodes, approximately 3½ minutes long, which include a short story and a lesson.

Episodes of the original series were made available via Advance Video cards for Game Boy Advance in 2005.

== Video games ==
=== Game Boy Advance ===
- Ocha-Ken no Heya (MTO, December 19, 2003)
- Ocha-Ken Kururin: Honwaka Puzzle de Hottoshiyou (MTO, October 28, 2004)
- Ocha-Ken no Yumebouken (MTO, April 28, 2005)
- Ocha-Ken no Boukenjima (MTO, December 22, 2005)

=== Nintendo DS ===
- Ocha-Ken no Heya DS (MTO, April 27, 2006)
- Ocha-Ken no Heya DS2 (MTO, January 18, 2007)
- Ocha-Ken no Daibouken - Honwaku Yumemiru Sekai Ryoukou (MTO, December 20, 2007)
- Ocha-Ken no Heya DS3 (MTO, May 22, 2008)
- Ocha-Ken no Daibouken 2 - Yumeippai no Omochabako (MTO, December 18, 2008)
- Ocha-Ken no Heya DS4 (MTO, November 2009)

=== Nintendo 3DS ===
- Ocha-Ken to Itsumo Nakayoshi (Nippon Columbia, December 1, 2011)

=== Arcade ===
- Ocha-ken Hot Medal (Sega, December 2007)
- Ocha-Ken no Puzzle (Compile Heart, December 2010)

=== iOS ===
- Ocha-Ken App (Comdoors, September 13, 2012)
- Ocha-Ken Solitaire (Wondershake, December 16, 2013)
