= GT Advance Championship Racing =

2001 video game

- North American cover art featuring a Honda S2000
- Developer: MTO
- Publishers: JP: MTO; WW: THQ
- Designer: Hiroshi Kitayama
- Series: GT Advance
- Platform: Game Boy Advance
- Release: JP: March 21, 2001; NA: June 11, 2001; EU: June 22, 2001
- Genre: Racing
- Modes: Single player, multiplayer

GT Advance Championship Racing (Note: Known in Japan as Advance GTA (アドバンスGTA, Adobansu GTA)) is a racing game developed by MTO and published by THQ. It was a launch title for the Game Boy Advance. The game's sequel, GT Advance 2: Rally Racing, was released on June 30, 2002, in North America.

GT Advance features forty-five licensed Japanese cars and places the player in races on thirty-two tracks. Due to positive reaction to the game in Japan, THQ purchased publishing rights for the North American and European releases to the game after a reported bidding war, and added in a controversial password save system into the game to cut costs.

The game was received with mostly positive reviews from critics that praised the game for its fun gameplay, but THQ was criticized by most reviewers for adding passwords to the game when the Japanese version had battery-backed saves.

== Gameplay ==
GT Advance Championship Racing is a customizable experience, including 48 cars from 8 car manufacturers, and 32 courses. Some of the cars featured in the game are exclusively found in Asia, such as the first-generation Nissan Cube. The courses vary between paved and dirt roads, requiring the player to adapt their driving to meet the conditions of the course they're driving on.

The game's championship mode features four levels of play, three cups of varying levels, and two unlockable "extra" modes, "kart racing mode" (labelled as Extra 1), and "formula racing mode" (labelled as Extra 2). Upgrades earned through gameplay can be added to the player's car, and in some cases, they can change the physical appearance of the vehicle. The game contains multiplayer support, allowing two people to play against each other using a Game Link Cable.

Controls are simple, with the A and B buttons controlling the player's gas and brakes respectively. The R and L buttons shift the car up or down a gear when set to manual control, and the D-Pad controls the car's steering. The game requires the player to master the powerslide technique to skid around corners and to reduce their lap time.

=== Graphics ===
A car powerslides through a turn.

The roads in the game are painted on a flat plane, which allows the game to progress at a smooth rate, but makes it harder for the player to see upcoming turns in the road. The problem can be remedied by playing through a track multiple times to gain familiarity with the turns in a course. The cars are rendered through sprite frames, giving the impression of 3D graphics in the game.

=== Save system ===
The Japanese version of the game, Advance GTA, had save support. However, THQ pulled the battery RAM out of the North American and European releases of the game, and utilized passwords to save data instead. The system forces players of the North American and European releases to enter a sixteen digit code consisting of upper and lowercase letters, numbers, and symbols into the game to retrieve their data. Many critics blamed THQ for what was perceived to be a cost-cutting measure. It was the only major change from the Japanese version of the game.

== Development ==
MTO began development on GT Advance Championship Racing about a year before the release of the game in Japan. The game was first announced in August 2000, under the name of Pocket GT Advance. With the exception of a new password save system, tweaking was kept to a minimum for the North American version of the game. The choice was made in the Japanese version to use mostly English in the game so it would be playable outside Japan.

The Japanese version of the game, Advance GTA, was praised by critics and the anticipation for the North American and European releases of the game grew. A reported bidding war between United States publishing companies to release the game in the US began after the positive feedback from the Japanese version. THQ later gained the publishing rights for the game's North American and European releases.

== Reception ==
Reception

Aggregate score
Aggregator	Score
Metacritic	82 of 100

Review scores
Publication	Score
Edge	6 of 10
Electronic Gaming Monthly	8.83 of 10 (Note: In Electronic Gaming Monthly's review of the game, two critics gave it each a score of 9/10, and the other gave it 8.5/10.)
Eurogamer	7 of 10
Famitsu	26 of 40
Game Informer	6 of 10
GameSpot	7.3 of 10
GameSpy	84%
IGN	8 of 10
Next Generation	3 of 5
Nintendo Power	4 of 5

GT Advance Championship Racing received "favorable" reviews according to the review aggregation website Metacritic. In Japan, Famitsu gave it a score of 26 out of 40.

Critics garnered praise for its overall gameplay, but the inclusion of a password save system by THQ into the North American and European releases was heavily criticized. IGN's Craig Harris praised the high quality graphics engine and the entertaining powerslide system, but panned the password system. GameSpot called GT Advance as robust and graphically impressive racing game. Despite praising the gameplay, GameSpot recommended that players buy a Japanese import version of the game instead, since it was in English and included a battery save feature. Eurogamer wrote that even though GT Advance was hampered by passwords, it recommended the game for fans of racing genre. NextGen praised the selection of cars and tracks, and called the graphics and sound as "passable", but was critical that some tracks are short and that the game has issue with collision physics. Bro Buzz of GamePro said, "Despite the dents, GT Advance is a solid early contender in the handheld racing championship—just be sure to drive with the lights on." (Note: GamePro gave the game three 4/5 scores for graphics, control, and fun factor, and 3/5 for sound.)

Responding to criticisms of the password save system, THQ later re-instated the battery save feature into the two sequels of the game, GT Advance 2: Rally Racing, and GT Advance 3: Pro Concept Racing.
