= Tigerz =

2008 video game

- North American cover art
- Developer: Magic Pockets
- Publisher: Ubisoft
- Composer: Frédéric Motte
- Series: Petz
- Platform: Nintendo DS
- Release: NA: February 26, 2008; PAL: February 28, 2008
- Genre: Life simulation game
- Mode: Single-player

Reception

Review scores
Publication	Score
IGN	7.7/10
Jeuxvideo.com	8/10

Tigerz is a video game in the Petz series, developed by French studio Magic Pockets and released by Ubisoft in February 2008 for the Nintendo DS. It was released after Petz 5, and is therefore part of the second Petz series. Players take on the roles of Enzo and Anna, two young animal trainers who travel the world, training animals to earn money for their family company.

Tigerz is also known as Petz Wild Animals: Tigerz in North America or Tigerz: Circus Adventures in Europe (outside the UK).

== Plot ==
The game starts when Enzo and Anna, two young animal trainers, are given two tigers by their grandfather. In order to save their family company of animal trainers from bankruptcy, they travel the world, training several show animals, to earn money.

== Gameplay ==
The player's goal in the game is to train show animals, and care for the pair of tigers that have been given to the player. By use of the touchscreen and the built-in microphone, players can touch and talk to the animals to interact with them. The key part to the training is a combination of leading the animals in doing the tricks, and finding out what distracts the animals, to help them concentrate.

Besides the animal training, there is a bit of strategy that comes into play with running the animal training agency. Some people the player meet could use bad training methods with their animals or wish the player's training agency to close.

Eventually, the player works towards their own animal reserve step by step that will be able to help endangered animals all around the world.

== Missions ==
There are 8 main missions, in which the player trains certain animals around the world, that are in trouble:

- The player starts with the two tigers given to them by their grandfather.
- In England the player helps a dog whose hat is too big and sometimes fall on its eyes during the performances.
- In Paris the player helps a cat that suffers from an itching crisis during the shows.
- In Russia the player helps a bear that has stomach problems while on stage.
- In San Francisco the player helps a football-team chimp.
- In India the player helps a jumping elephant.
- In New York the player helps a dancing lion.
