= Petz: Dogz 2 (Nintendo DS video game) =

2006 video game

- Ocha-Ken no Heya DS's original box art
- Developer: MTO
- Publishers: MTO; Ubisoft
- Platforms: Game Boy Advance, Nintendo DS
- Release: JP: 27 April 2006; NA: November 2007; JP: 13 March 2008
- Genres: virtual pet Sandbox game Tabletop game

Petz: Dogz 2 is a virtual pet and home design game in the Petz series, released for the Nintendo DS in 2007. It is a localisation of the Japanese game Ocha-Ken no Heya DS (お茶犬の部屋DS), released in November 2006, and developed by MTO, as part of the Ocha-Ken media franchise—with colorful dogs of that series replaced with more realistic ones.

== Gameplay ==
In the international version, players can pick between one of 11 breeds of dog. While the gameplay has some commonalities with other virtual pet and pet simulation games, the game mainly focuses on home decoration, as well as playing card games. IGN compared it to a cross between "Nintendogs, Clubhouse Games and Animal Crossing." Items used for decoration are won through playing a series of minigames. Card games playable include Poker, Old maid, Crazy 8's and Blackjack, and other mini-games include bowling and memory games.

== Development ==
Ocha-Ken no Heya DS (お茶犬の部屋DS) was released on April 27 2006. It followed a series of Ocha-Ken games released for the Game Boy Advance, but had added features and—for the first time—3D graphics. The game was retooled—with more realistic dogs—and released world wide as Petz: Dogz 2 for November 2007 to coincide with a series of other games Ubisoft were publishing with that name, on various platforms.

MTO re-released the game with the realistic dogs seen in Petz: Dogz 2 back in japan—on the 13 March 2008—resulting in Oheya o Kazarō - Koinu no Heya (お部屋をかざろう 仔犬の部屋).

== Reception ==
Reception

Review scores
Publication	Score
Famitsu	24/40
Gamekult	2/10
IGN	6.8/10
Jeuxvideo.com	7/20

Lucas Thomas of IGN thought the combination of genres resulted in a "kind of fun" experience which none the less never feel cohesive. He particularly enjoyed the traditional analog games playable, but recommended against people buying the game that wanted a "traditional virtual pet experience". Loup Lassinat-Foubert, reviewing the game for Gamekult was far more critical, finding that the games "deformed" art style made it difficult to connect with the animals, and criticizing the texture and model quality. The review for Jeuxvideo was disappointed by how little there was to do with the dogs in the game, calling it little more than a mini-game collection. Reviewers in Famitsu, reviewing the 2008 Japanese re-release, largely agreed regarding the lack of meaningful interaction with your dogs. The lack of differentiation when compared to Ocha-Ken no Heya DS was also criticized.
