= Oddballz =

1996 video game

Oddballz: Your Wacky Computer Petz
- Italian box art
- Developer: PF Magic
- Publisher: PF Magic
- Platforms: Microsoft Windows, Mac OS 7
- Release: Windows: 1996
- Genre: Virtual pets
- Mode: Single Player

Oddballz: Your Wacky Computer Petz is a virtual pet game developed by PF Magic, as part of the Petz series, released in 1996. It follows, and uses many of the systems as, PF Magic's previous Catz and Dogz.

== Gameplay ==
Oddballz follows much of format of Catz and Dogz, with the player being able to adopt a selection of pets, and to play or punish them affecting their mood. However, unlike its predecessors it focuses on fantasy and Chimeric animals—such as a "cross between a walrus and a rabbit" or "half duck, half bear". Also unlike those games, Oddballz includes more than the starting 6 animals, allowing the user to unlock and collect them. New "toys"—items used to interact with your petz—include ray guns, magnets and fire extinguishers. Creatures could also be further "mutated" and traded online with other players, further enhancing the collectability aspect.

A pet interacting with the user and its surroundings

The game had the ability to get extra content—either from the official website, or on CD-ROM.

== Reception ==
Reception

Review scores
Publication	Score
AllGame	4/5 stars
The Philadelphia Inquirer	8/10 stars
MacNN	3/5 stars

Alex Garland, in The Daily Telegraph, thought while boring to adults, the collectability aspect would make it appealing to children. Similarly, while Robert Wright found nothing compelling for him, he recounts that his three children—aged 10, 8 and 4—had "been playing it endlessly".

Trevor Covert, of MacNN, while praising the software's intuitive interface, criticized the lack of Mac support for the CD-ROM expansions.

== See also ==
- Babyz
