= Alexandra Ledermann (video game series) =

Alexandra Ledermann Pippa Funnell Abenteuer auf dem Reiterhof
- The logos of the titles under which the ninth entry in the series was released in Europe (top to bottom, left to right): Horsez (NL); Abenteuer auf dem Reiterhof: Die Pferdeflüsterin (DE); Pippa Funnell 5: Ranch Rescue (UK); Alexandra Ledermann: Le Haras de la vallée (FR)
- Developers: Lexis Numérique; IR Gurus Interactive; Digital Illusions; DreamCatcher Interactive
- Publishers: Lexis Numérique; Ubisoft

Alexandra Ledermann (in France), Pippa Funnell (in the UK) or Abenteuer auf dem Reiterhof (in Germany) is a horse themed video gaming series mainly developed by Lexis Numérique. In other territories the games where also published as part of the Petz and Imagine series, among others.

By 2009, more than a million copies of games in the series had been sold. The French and English series are named after the equestrians Alexandra Ledermann and Pippa Funnell, respectively.

== Games ==
Home console and PC games
French Series Alexandra Ledermann	English Series Pippa Funnell	German Series Abenteuer auf dem Reiterhof	Other Titles	Year first published	Refs
Alexandra Ledermann: Équitation Passion			Riding Star (int); Mary King's Riding Star (UK); Ulrich Kirchhoff's Riding Star (DE); Anky van Grunsven's Riding Star (NL)	1999	
Alexandra Ledermann 2: Équitation Compétition			Equestriad 2001 (int)	2000	
Alexandra Ledermann 3: Équitation Aventure		Abenteuer auf dem Reiterhof 1: Das Abenteuer Rund um's Pferd	Riding Champion: Legacy of Rosemond Hill (int); Arvet från Rosemond Hill (SE)	2000	
Alexandra Ledermann 4: Aventures au Haras		Abenteuer auf dem Reiterhof 2: Die Verschwörung	Saddle Up: Time to Ride (US/UK); Aventuras a Caballo y el Misterio del Club Hípico (ES)	2003	
Alexandra Ledermann 5: L'Héritage du Haras	Pippa Funnell 1: The Stud Farm Inheritance	Abenteuer auf dem Reiterhof 3: Das Erbe Der Gräfin	Saddle Up with Pippa Funnell (US)	2005	
Alexandra Ledermann 6: L'Ecole des Champions	Pippa Funnell 2: Take the Reins	Abenteuer auf dem Reiterhof 4: Die Meisterschule	Champion Dreams - First to Ride (NA); Horsez (PS2, US)	2006	
Alexandra Ledermann 7: Le Défi de l'Étrier d'Or	Pippa Funnell 3: The Golden Stirrup Challenge	Abenteuer auf dem Reiterhof 5: Der Goldene Steigbügel	Horsez (PC, US)	2007	
Alexandra Ledermann 8: Les Secrets Du Haras	Pippa Funnell 4: Secrets of the Ranch	Abenteuer auf dem Reiterhof 6: Kampf um die Ranch	Horsez: Het Geheim van de Manege (NL); Petz Horsez 2 (PC, US)		
Alexandra Ledermann: Le Haras de la vallée	Pippa Funnell 5: Ranch Rescue	Abenteuer auf dem Reiterhof: Die Pferdeflüsterin	Horsez - Plezier op de manege (NL); Petz Horsez 2 (PS2/Wii, US); Horsez (EU)	2007	
Alexandra Ledermann: La colline aux chevaux sauvages		Abenteuer auf dem Reiterhof: Die Wilden Mustangs	Petz Horse Club (US); Imagine: Champion Rider (int); Laura's Passie: Wilde Paarden (NL)	2008	
Alexandra Ledermann: L'été au Haras			My Riding Stables: Life With Horses; Mein Gestüt 2: Ein Leben für die Pferde		

Portable consoles
French Series Alexandra Ledermann	English Series Pippa Funnell	German Series Abenteuer auf dem Reiterhof	Other Titles	Refs
Game Boy Advance
Alexandra Ledermann	Pippa Funnell: Stable Adventure		Pferd & Pony: Mein Pferdehof (DE)	
Alexandra Ledermann : Aventures au galop	Pippa Funnell 2		Pferd & Pony: Lass uns reiten 2 (DE)	
Nintendo DS
Alexandra Ledermann: Adventures at a gallop	Pippa Funnell	Abenteuer auf dem Reiterhof	Horsez (US)	
Alexandra Ledermann 2: Mon Aventure au Haras	Pippa Funnell 2: Farm Adventures	Abenteuer auf dem Reiterhof: Wiedersehen im Tal	Horsez: Mijn avonturen op de manege (NL); Petz Horsez 2 (US)	
Alexandra Ledermann: Le mystère des chevaux sauvages		Abenteuer auf dem Reiterhof: Das schwarze Wildpferd	Imagine: Champion Rider (EU)	
Alexandra Ledermann: Aventures au Camp d'été		Abenteuer auf dem Reiterhof: Das Sommer-Camp	Imagine: Champion Rider (EU); Petz: Horsez Family (US)	
Poney Club by Alexandra Ledermann			Petz: Pony Club (EU); Petz Pony Beauty Pageant (US)	
Nintendo 3DS
Alexandra Ledermann 3D			Horses 3D (US); Imagine Champion Rider 3D (EU)	
PlayStation Portable
Alexandra Ledermann: Le Haras de la vallée		Abenteuer auf dem Reiterhof - Die Pferdeflüsterin	Imagine: Champion Rider (EU); Petz Saddle Club (US)	
