= Can You Pet the Dog? =

Twitter account

@CanYouPetTheDog
- Years active: 2019–present
- Known for: Video game-related tweets
- Website: @CanYouPetTheDog on Twitter @CanYouPetTheDog on Bluesky

Can You Pet the Dog? is a Twitter and Bluesky account created by Tristan Cooper in March 2019 which documents whether dogs or other creatures within selected video games can be petted by the player character.

== Concept and history ==
Cooper found that the stray dogs in Tom Clancy's The Division 2 could not be petted by players. He stated he "was frustrated that [the game] purposely put dogs in a poor situation, meant to evoke empathy from the player, but there was no way to comfort or care for these hungry, frightened creatures". He found other players had expressed similar concerns, and created the account, leading with The Division 2's inability to pet the dog, in March 2019. Subsequent tweets simply reported the ability or inability to pet dogs in games, with a screenshot showing this capacity. Cooper said that the action of dog-petting in games generally does not yield any type of in-game reward or benefit, but that "In an industry where living, never-ending games increasingly demand more and more of the player’s time, energy and focus, petting a dog can feel like a pressure release". Over time, Cooper focused less on games where dogs cannot be petted, outside of in-jokes within games, where the act of trying to pet a dog may have disastrous consequences for the player. Cooper felt the focus on a game's failure to include a pettable dog gave a game too much undesired negative attention, though does still include such games after checking with the developers ahead of time.

Within about three months, the account had over 250,000 followers, and nearly 500,000 by November 2020.

Cooper collaborated with Humble Bundle for a special bundle in September 2020 featuring games that were featured on the Twitter account that allowed players to pet dogs. In March 2020, Cooper started a second Twitter account Is Something Behind the Waterfall?, documenting whether players would discover hidden items on video game maps behind waterfalls.

While games since the account's launch have promoted that one can pet the dog in their games in reference to the account, Cooper reacted angrily when he was mentioned by the Harry Potter Film Twitter account in a promotional tweet which showed that you would be able to pet cats in the then upcoming game Hogwarts Legacy. The game is based on the Wizarding World by author J.K. Rowling, and while Rowling did not have any direct involvement in its creation, Cooper expressed that "in the end, the game lines the pockets" of someone Cooper believes is "awful", due to her views on transgender issues.

== Impact ==
Though dog-petting had been a mechanic in video games prior to Cooper's documentation, as a result of Can You Pet the Dog?, some game designers have purposely incorporated dog-petting as a mechanic in their games, such as in Afterparty and CrossCode. The Division 2 added the ability to pet dogs in the Warlords of New York expansion in March 2020. Some developers have gone out of their way to incorporate the dog-petting mechanic at the expense of other features; Supergiant Games stated that for Hades, they did include the ability for the player to pet Cerberus but due to having limited animator time, had to restrict other animations in the game including extended petting animations. Lair of the Clockwork God included a dog that the developers had the "specific intention of trolling Can You Pet The Dog" that made it difficult, but not impossible, to pet. The Twitter account and attention from players has led to inclusion of more interactive, detailed wildlife in video games.
