= Furby =

Electronic robotic toy

- Other names: Furbee (used in Sweden to avoid confusion with the locality of the same name)
- Type: Electronic toy
- Invented by: David Hampton and Caleb Chung
- Company: Tiger Electronics/Hasbro (1998–2001, 2005–2007, 2012–current)
- Country: United States
- Availability: 1998–present
- Slogan: The more you play with me, the more I do! I will keep amazing you! (1998–2001); Your Emoto-tronic Friend (2005–2007) a mind of its own (2012), a new generation is hatching (Boom), Furby Connects You To A World Of Surprises (Connect) (2012–2018)
- Official website

Furby is an American electronic robotic toy created by Tiger Electronics – a subsidiary of Hasbro. Originally released in October 1998, it resembles an owl-like creature and went through a period of being a "must-have" toy following its holiday season launch. More than 40 million Furbies were sold during the three years of its original production, with 1.8 million sold in 1998 and 14 million in 1999. Overall, its speaking capabilities were translated into 17 various languages.

Furbies were the first successful attempt to produce and sell a domestically aimed robot. A newly purchased Furby, or a Furby that has been reset, starts out speaking entirely "Furbish" – the unique language that all Furbies speak – but is programmed to start speaking English words and phrases in place of Furbish over time. This process is intended to resemble the process of learning English.

Four years after the toy's end of production, Hasbro introduced an updated Furby in 2005 called the Emoto-Tronic Furby. This updated Furby has voice recognition and more complex facial movements and was sold until 2007. Furby with black and white LCD eyes was released in 2012, and the following year (2013) an almost identical version of this Furby called "Furby Boom!" released alongside a mobile app to further play with this new Furby. Another updated Furby with color LCD eyes, known as Furby Connect, was released in 2016 with a new app called "Furby Connect World". The 5th generation, released in 2023, includes the new Furby, DJ Furby (likely inspired by the fandom's hand-made Long Furbies), and the Furby Vibes, which all have bright, vibrant colors and led lights in their faces/ears.

== History ==
=== Initial creation ===
Dave Hampton and Caleb Chung spent nine months creating the Furby (in addition to nine months spent designing the toy). After two attempts at licensing the concept, they invited fellow toy and game inventor Richard C. Levy to join their efforts to sell Furby. Levy brought Furby to Tiger Electronics and Tiger's Roger Shiffman bought the rights to it. Furby's first public appearance was at the 1998 American International Toy Fair held in New York City.

The product officially launched on October 2, 1998. Furbies originally retailed for about US$35, and upon release, they sold very well. Catapulting demand during the 1998 Christmas period drove the resale price over $100, and sometimes as high as several hundred dollars. Furbies were sold for over $300 in newspapers and in auctions. Nicknames were given to the different aesthetic varieties, and sellers assigned rarity values to them.

The significant aftermarket demand (and price) for the toy resulted in cases of fraud in which customers paid for Furbies that were never delivered. As supplies dwindled, and when retail supplies ran out, buyers turned to the Internet, where Furbies could be purchased for two, three, or more multiples of their retail price. During one 12-month period, a total of 27 million Furby toys were sold.

=== Revivals ===
2005 saw the reintroduction of Furby with the release of the new Emoto-Tronic Furby.

On April 12, 2012, it was announced that Hasbro would be making a new line of Furbies. The new line was released in September 2012. As of December 2012 there were sixteen colors: teal, white, black, purple, tangerine-tango, yellow, aqua, navy blue, plum, pink, pink/teal, orange/blue, black/pink, blue/yellow, teal/purple, and gray/teal. Furbies were one of the eleven toys named the top toys for Christmas 2013 by the Toy Retailers Association at the DreamToys Convention where they unveil their predictions for the most popular holiday toys annually.

In 2025, Furby was named a finalist for induction into the National Toy Hall of Fame at The Strong National Museum of Play.

== Types ==
=== First generation (1998–2002) ===
Furby-Shelby toy from McDonald's (2000)

The main reason for their popularity was because of apparent "intelligence", as reflected in their ability to develop language skills.

Furbies can communicate with one another via an infrared port located between their eyes. Furbies start out speaking entirely "Furbish", a language with short words, simple syllables, and various other sounds. They are programmed, however, to speak less and less Furbish and more and more English as they "grow". According to the variant, it knew 9 languages (English, French, Spanish, German, Italian, Japanese, Swedish, Greek and Portuguese).

There was a common misconception that they repeated words that were said around them. This belief most likely stemmed from the fact that it is possible to have the Furby say certain pre-programmed words or phrases more often by petting it whenever it said these words. As a result of this myth, several intelligence agencies banned them from their offices.

A simple electric motor and a system of cams and gears close the Furby's eyes and mouth, raise its ears, and lift it off the ground in a faux display of mobility.

The originals are popular with many hackers as they can be dissected and made to do interesting things. In particular, their audio capabilities and various sensory interfaces make them popular with the circuit bending community.

McDonald's Happy Meal toy Furby-Shelby was released in 2000 in the United Kingdom, there are 8 to collect in total (4 classic look and 4 clams). These toys can sing to each other via a sensor in their feet.

==== Furby Babies ====
In 1999, the Furby Babies line was introduced. Furby Babies are smaller than the original, have higher voices, and cannot dance, but they switch to speaking English more quickly. They also have an extended vocabulary and different "Easter eggs" and "games" built into them. Furby Babies come in 24 different colors. All have white eyelashes and one of six different eyecolors.

==== Furby Friends ====
Novel Furbies were also released, including an interactive Furby-style "Gizmo", from the film Gremlins, a Furby-style "Interactive Yoda" based on the Star Wars character, and a Furby-style "Interactive E.T." from the movie of the same name. Another "friend of Furby", called "Shelby", is similar to Furby, but looks like a clam, has vast improvements in memory, and has a different personality; it was released in 2001 and can communicate with the original Furbies and Furby Babies. They also have sensors that can sense loud sounds, can sense being upside down (they say things like "Shiver me timbers" and "Walk the plank" when left upside-down for an extended period of time), and they laugh when "tickled" (their antennae – or "tennies", as they like to call them). They also purr when "petted". They can be fed by sticking a finger in their mouth. Similarly, Shelbies do not have their own names, unlike the classic Furbies. Shelbies are also capable of knowing if it is talking to a Furby or another Shelby, saying phrases such as "Where's Furby?"—though they cannot differentiate between a Furby and a Furby Baby—they just assume it is a Furby. In addition to English, Shelbies also know some Furbish words and also have their own unique language called "Shelbish".

=== Second generation (2005–2007) ===
Emoto-Tronic Furbies were released in August 2005. Larger than the previous version, the new Furbies were upgraded with a more emotional face and a voice recognition system, enabling them to communicate with humans. Unlike the Furbies originally released, just one order is necessary to make them 'sleep', and they have an on/off switch. They can communicate with other Emoto-tronic Furbies, though to a lesser extent than the communication between original Furbies, and they cannot themselves communicate with the original Furbies nor Funky Furbies. They also lack light sensors and basic motion sensors and do not respond to loud sounds as the originals do. These Furbies, according to the story they come packed with, are from Furby Island. It knew seven languages (Swedish and Greek disappeared).

==== Emoto-Tronic Furby Babies ====
In 2006, a new version of Furby Baby was released, with the most notable features being the new look and a more "babyish" appearance in contrast to the Emoto-Tronic Furby adult. They also have considerably fewer features than the "adult" Furby, with a very limited vocabulary and a lower level of interactivity. Another notable feature of the 2006 Emoto-Tronic Baby Furby is the movable "legs" which unfurl when a Furby Baby is awake. Although they were a European exclusive, they were sold in the US via the Hasbro Toy Shop website.

==== Emoto-Tronic Funky Furbies ====
The Funky Furbies were released in August 2006 outside the United States. They have three color combinations (pink and yellow; purple and green; blue and purple), they can sing three new songs and dance. They can be taught dance routines and remember them.

=== Third generation (2012–2015) ===
A new Furby was released in the fall of 2012. It has new monochromatic LCD eyes, a wider range of motions and the ability to adapt its personality in reaction to user behavior. Compared to the first generation, variants with Russian, Chinese, Mandarin, Korean and Polish were also produced, increasing the number of languages to 14. The on-off switch is replaced with a reset button; the Furby turns itself off after one minute of inactivity. It has its own iOS and Android app Furby that communicates via high pitched sounds. The application was however later removed from mobile app stores.

==== Furby Party Rockers ====
A series of toys called Furby Party Rockers was released in addition to the 2012 Furbies. Those feature pre-programmed personalities that differ between the various models.

Instead of the screens that the full-size Furbies feature, their eyes are made out of transparent plastic with a backing that has a static pattern printed. The eyes have an LED backlight and the printed image is stereoscopic so that it changes depending on the viewing angle. The Party Rockers do not have any moving parts.

==== Furby BOOM! ====
In summer of 2013, about a year after the 2012 Furby came out, a new Furby was released with new different colors and new Personalities. It had new iOS and Android app, called Furby BOOM!, with many new features. Like the app for the 2012 Furby, the Furby BOOM! app was also later removed from mobile app stores.

==== Furblings (toy version) ====
In June 2014, a toy version of the Furblings from the Furby BOOM! app was released with a golden limited time coloring. It can communicate with Furby Booms and with the app.

==== Furby Boom Crystal ====
The release for Christmas 2014 was called the Furby Boom Crystal series, with a redesign of the ears, face and feet, and new bright neon fur. The iOS and Android apps were also redesigned.

==== Furby Boom Crystal Furblings ====
In early 2015, a toy version of the Furby Boom Crystal Furblings from the app was released. Like the other Furblings, it can communicate with Furby Boom Crystals, and be used with the app.

==== Furbacca ====
In June 2015, a Furby that resembles Chewbacca from Star Wars was released. It is similar to the Furby Boom because it can hatch Furblings with the same app and more.

=== Fourth generation (2016–2017) ===
In 2016, new Furby Connect with color LCD eyes and more expressive movements was released. The Furby Connect has a translucent plastic joystick on its head which lights up different colors when toggled and is used to control games played with Furblings in the app. Unlike the 2012 Furby and Furby Boom, the Furby Connect does not change personalities. It can sing songs that it "learns" from the app. It had an app Furby Connect World containing a whole world of Furblings for it to interact with, the app was however removed from mobile app stores in 2021. It knew two languages, English or Russian.

=== Fifth generation (2023–present) ===
On June 22, 2023, Hasbro announced the return of the Furby line with "5 voice activated modes" and "over 600 responses". It comes in two basic varieties: purple and coral, special edition are: tie-dye, aurora and gold. Unlike Furby Connect and Furby Boom, they cannot connect to an app, and instead of LCD eyes, they have drawn eyes. The new Furby has glowing ears, responds to petting, shaking, and feeding, and it also comes with bundled accessories (necklace with beads and comb). It knows English, Spanish, French, German, Portuguese, Italian, Japanese, Turkish, Dutch, Polish and Czech.

==== Furblets ====
On December 1, 2023, Hasbro introduced Furblets. This is a smaller Furby with no moving parts, aside from ears which can be moved manually.

== Technology ==
The original Furby source code was written in assembly language for the 6502 microprocessor.

The first Furby model was based around a 6502-style Sunplus SPC81A microcontroller, which had 80 KiB of ROM and 128 bytes of RAM. Its core differed from the original 6502 in the lack of the Y index register. The TSP50C04 chip from Texas Instruments, implementing the linear predictive coding codec, was used for voice synthesis.

== Security concerns ==
On January 13, 1999, it was reported the National Security Agency (NSA) of the United States banned Furbies from entering NSA's property due to concerns that they may be used to record and repeat classified information, advising those that see any on NSA property to "contact their Staff Security Officer for guidance." It was thought within the NSA that Furbies had an artificial intelligence chip that could "learn" from things the user said. The NSA theorized that if employees discussed confidential information around the toys, that information could be repeated at a later date.

Roger Shiffman, the owner of Tiger Electronics, stated that "Furby has absolutely no ability to do any recording whatsoever," and that he would have gladly told the NSA this if he was asked by anyone from the spy agency. Additionally, Dave Hampton demonstrated that Furby's microphone can not record any sound at all, and can only hear a single monotonous beep if a loud sound is produced around Furby, and no words or waveforms can be made out at all. The ban was eventually withdrawn.

In 2017, it has been confirmed that Furby Connect can be connected through a Bluetooth (usually up to 10 meters) and with the special application upload and play any custom audio file, by anyone, as no password is required.

== Furbish ==
"Furbish" is the Furbies' language, with simple syllables, short words, and various sounds. A newly purchased Furby starts out speaking entirely in Furbish. Over time, the Furby gradually replaces Furbish words and phrases with English.

== Film adaptation ==
Bob Weinstein announced in November 2016 that a Furby film adaptation is to be produced by The Weinstein Company (TWC). The film was written by Daniel Persitz and Devon Kliger, and will contain both live action and animated characters. In regards to the film's narrative, Hasbro executive Stephen Davis stated that "we think that this can resonate as a four-quadrant film. It can't just be a 90-minute commercial." TWC filed for Chapter 11 bankruptcy on March 19, 2018. On May 1, 2018, Lantern Capital emerged as the winner of the studio's bankruptcy auction. On July 16, 2018, it was announced that TWC had shut down, and that its assets had been sold to the newly created Lantern Entertainment. It is unclear whether Lantern Entertainment will take over producing the project.

== See also ==
- Virtual pet
- Companion robot
- Hatchimals
- Tamagotchi
- Simlish
- Tattletail, a horror video game with Furby-like characters
