= GT Advance 2: Rally Racing =

2001 video game

- North American cover art featuring a Subaru Impreza WRC
- Developer: MTO
- Publishers: JP: MTO; WW: THQ
- Series: GT Advance
- Platform: Game Boy Advance
- Release: JP: December 7, 2001; NA: June 18, 2002; EU: June 28, 2002
- Genre: Racing
- Modes: Single-player, multiplayer

GT Advance 2: Rally Racing (Note: アドバンスラリー, Adobansu Rarī) is a rally racing game developed by MTO and published by THQ for the Game Boy Advance, as a sequel to GT Advance Championship Racing. The game features cars from several real Japanese car manufacturers. The player can race on fourteen different courses located in various parts of the world or act as the co-driver. The game was released in Japan on the on December 7, 2001, and in North America and Europe in June 2002. It received generally favorable reviews from critics.

== Gameplay ==
Gameplay screenshot

GT Advance 2: Rally Racing is a racing game and the cars and environments hold true to a rally racing format. The game contains fifteen cars from Japanese companies such as Subaru, Suzuki, and Mitsubishi. Upgrades are not available for the cars, but it is possible to fine-tune them to fit personal preference.

=== Game modes ===
The game has several different modes. The main part of the game, "world rally", moves the player through fourteen courses found in various locations in the world. The game also has a head-to-head mode against a friend with a system link, 15 different license tests that familiarize the player with the controls of the game, a time trial mode, a single race mode, a practice mode, and a navigator mode, in which the player directs the driver of the car through button and d-pad presses instead of driving themselves.

=== Save system ===
The game includes a major enhancement in the save system from the previous installment. In GT Advance Championship Racing, as a cost-saving measure, the battery RAM was pulled from the game and was replaced with a password system instead of the one included in the Japanese version of the game. Critics cited this as the chief problem with the North American release of the game. GT Advance 2: Rally Racing addressed the problem by including a standard save system.

== Reception ==
Reception

Aggregate score
Aggregator	Score
Metacritic	77/100

Review scores
Publication	Score
AllGame	3.5/5
Edge	5/10
Electronic Gaming Monthly	7/10
Famitsu	28/40
GamePro	3.5/5
GameSpot	8.1/10
GameSpy	4/5
GameZone	7.4/10
IGN	8.4/10
Nintendo Power	4/5

GT Advance 2: Rally Racing received "generally favorable reviews", albeit a little less favorable than the first game, according to the review aggregation website Metacritic. IGN complimented THQ for addressing the previous game's mistakes. GameSpy praised GT Advance 2, pointing out the refreshing realism aspect of the weather conditions that pop up from time to time in the game and require the player to tune their car before a race. In Japan, Famitsu gave it a score of 28 out of 40.
