= Petz =

Series of virtual pet video games

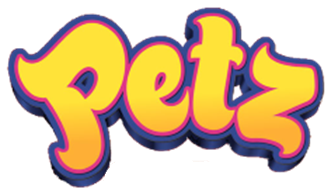
- Genre: Virtual pets
- Developer: Various
- Publishers: PF.Magic, Mindscape, Ubisoft
- First release: Dogz and Catz; November 1, 1995
- Latest release: Petz Beach; Petz Countryside; October 14, 2014

Petz is a series of single-player video games dating back to 1995, in which the player can adopt, raise, care for and breed their own virtual pets. Developed by PF.Magic, original Petz (Dogz and Catz) has sold over 1.5 million copies worldwide. The series has grown to over 22 million copies as of 2011 since coming under Ubisoft.

== Development ==
The original Petz games — Dogz: Your Computer Pet and Catz: Your Computer Pet—were developed by PF.Magic, released in 1995 and 1996 respectively. They reused the graphics engine used in Ballz. Rob Fulop conceived of Dogz, following the controversy surrounding his previous title Night Trap, which resulted in him wanting to make a game that was "so cute and so adorable that no could ever, ever say it was bad for kids". He claims to have consulted a shopping mall Santa Claus about what children wanted, and was informed that puppies were the most popular request every year.

Following the success the company, instead of continuing to branch out into other household pets, developed Oddballz, focused on Chimeraic and mutatable creatures. This would release along with sequels to the Dogz and Catz.

In 1997, PF.Magic was acquired by The Learning Company's Mindscape division for $15.8 million in 1998. In 2001, Ubi Soft (Ubisoft, since 2003) acquired the entertainment division of The Learning Company, granting Ubisoft exclusive publishing rights to 88 titles, including Dogz and Catz.

Ubisoft would publish Catz 5 and Dogz 5, in 2002, as the last games following the original style, before putting franchise on hold for three years. After releasing Dogz and Catz for the Game Boy Advance in 2005 and 2006, Ubisoft announced their intention for a "revitalisation" of the series, in direct response to the success of Nintendo's Nintendogs. The successive entries were in many ways very different from the PF.Magic games, with many being localised games from Japan or Europe—simply rebranded with the Petz name.

In, 2010 Ubisoft announced its intention to publish a Frima Studios developed Petz themed MMO under the title Petz World, which they expected to be released in 2011. No further announcements have been subsequently made, and no such game was ever released.

Ubisoft continued releasing entries until 2014.

== Animals ==
The initial games were limited to dogz and catz, but additional animals were also introduced. These animals include Pigz, Bunnyz, Monkeyz, Dolphinz, and Hamsterz, some of which received their own games.

Users learned how to reverse-engineer the system, and began producing additional breedz, toyz, playscenes, clothes, and developer tools for the games, as permitted by PF.Magic, Mindscape, and Ubisoft.

== Games ==
| Game | Developer | Publisher | Release date | Platform | Ref(s) |
|---|---|---|---|---|---|
| Catz and Dogz: Your Virtual Petz | PF.Magic | PF.Magic, Virgin Interactive Entertainment | 1995 (Dogz; PC); 1996 (Catz; PC); 1999 (GBC) | PC; Game Boy Color | |
| Oddballz: Your Wacky Computer Petz | PF.Magic | PF.Magic, Virgin Interactive Entertainment | 1996 | PC | |
| Catz and Dogz II: Your Virtual Petz | PF.Magic | PF.Magic, Mindscape | 1997 | PC | |
| Catz and Dogz 3: Your Virtual Petz | PF.Magic | PF.Magic, Mindscape | 1998 | PC | |
| Catz and Dogz 4 | PF.Magic | Mindscape Entertainment | 1999 | PC | |
| Catz and Dogz 5 | Studio Mythos | Ubi Soft | 2002 | PC | |
| Dogz (Note: Originally published in 2004 as Kawaii Koinu Wonderful (かわいい仔犬 ワンダフル, lit. 'Cute Puppy Wonderful'), in Japan) | MTO, Backbone Entertainment | Ubisoft | 2005 (GBA); 2006 (DS) | Game Boy Advance; Nintendo DS | |
| Catz (Note: Originally published, in 2002, as Nakayoshi Pet Advance Series 3: Kawaii Koneko (なかよしペットアドバンスシリーズ3 かわいい子猫), in Japan) | MTO | Ubisoft | 2006 | Game Boy Advance | |
| Catz | Powerhead Games | Ubisoft | 2006 | Nintendo DS | |
| Dogz and Catz (Note: Marketed in some territories as Dogs 6 and Catz 6) | ImaginEngine | Ubisoft | 2006 | PC | |
| Hamsterz Life (Note: Original published as Love Love Hamster, in Japan) | Digital Kids | Ubisoft | 2006 | Nintendo DS | |
| Horsez (Note: Originally published as multiple different entries in the French Alexandra Ledermann series, depending on platform) | Lexis Numérique | Ubisoft | 2006 | PC; Game Boy Advance; Nintendo DS; PlayStation 2 | |
| Petz: Dogz 2 and Catz 2 (Note: Released in Japan as, the RPGs Nyanko to Mahou no Boushi (にゃんこと魔法のぼうし, lit. 'The Kitten and the Magic Hat') and Wanko to Mahou no Boushi (わんこと魔法のぼうし, lit. 'The Puppy and the Magic Hat') respectively) | Yuke's | Ubisoft | 2007 | PlayStation 2; Wii | |
| Petz: Dogz 2 and Catz 2 | ImaginEngine | Ubisoft | 2007 | PC | |
| Petz: Catz 2 | Powerhead Games | Ubisoft | 2007 | Nintendo DS | |
| Petz: Dogz 2 (Note: Originally released in Japan as Ocha-Ken no Heya DS (お茶犬の部屋DS), in 2006, part of a series of games based on the media franchise Ocha-Ken) | MTO | Ubisoft | 2007 | Nintendo DS | |
| Dogz 2 (Note: An expanded re-release of Dogz for the Game Boy Advance) | MTO | Ubisoft | 2007 | Game Boy Advance | |
| Petz: Horsez 2 | Phoenix Studio | Ubisoft | 2007 | PC; Nintendo DS; PlayStation 2; Wii | |
| Petz: Hamsterz 2 (Note: Originally released, in 2006, as Hamster to Kurasō (ハムスターと暮らそう), in Japan) | HI Corporation | Ubisoft; Interchannel | 2007 | DS | |
| Petz Vet (Note: Originally published in 2004 as Himawari Doubutsu Byouin (ひまわリどうぶつ病院, lit. 'Sunflower Animal Hospital'), in Japan) | Sensory Sweep | Ubisoft | 2007 | Game Boy Advance | |
| Petz: Wild Animals: Dolphinz (Note: Originally developed and released in France as L'Ile aux Dauphins) | Magic Pockets | Ubisoft | 2007 | DS | |
| Petz: Wild Animals: Tigerz (Note: Originally developed and released in France as Le Cirque des Tigres) | Magic Pockets | Ubisoft | 2008 | Nintendo DS | |
| Petz: Bunnyz (Note: Virtually identical to Hamsterz Life, with rabbits swapped for hamsters) | Digital Kids | Ubisoft | 2008 | Nintendo DS | |
| Petz: Monkeyz House | MTO | Ubisoft | 2008 | Nintendo DS | |
| Petz: Horse Club (Note: Originally released as the 10th entry in the Alexandra Ledermann series: Alexandra Ledermann: La colline aux chevaux sauvages, released elsewhere as Imagine: Champion Rider, among other titles) | Phoenix Interactive | Ubisoft | 2008 | Wii, PC | |
| Petz Rescue: Ocean Patrol | Magic Pockets | Ubisoft | 2008 | DS | |
| Petz Rescue: Wildlife Vet | Virtual Toys | Ubisoft | 2008 | Wii; DS | |
| Petz Rescue: Endangered Paradise | Phoenix Studio | Ubisoft | 2008 | DS | |
| Petz Sports: Dog Playground | Ubisoft Montreal | Ubisoft | 2008 | Wii; Mac OS; Microsoft Windows | |
| Dogz | Gameloft | | 2008 | N-Gage 2.0 | |
| Petz: Dogz Pack | Ubisoft | Ubisoft | 2008 | DS | |
| Petz: Dogz Fashion (Note: Originally released, in 2007, as Oshare na Koinu DS (おしゃれな仔犬 DS), in Japan) | MTO | Ubisoft | 2008 | DS | |
| Petz: Catz Clan | Digital Kids | Ubisoft | 2008 | DS | |
| Petz: Crazy Monkeyz | Y'sK | Ubisoft | 2009 | Wii | |
| Petz Fashion: Dogz & Catz | Powerhead Games | Ubisoft | 2009 | DS | |
| Petz: My Baby Panda (Note: Only in Europe. Originally released in North America as National Geographic Panda, in 2008.) | Namco Bandai Games | | 2009 | DS | |
| Petz: Hamsterz Superstarz | Ubisoft Nagoya | Ubisoft | 2009 | DS | |
| Petz: Hamsterz Bunch | DK Games | Ubisoft | 2009 | PSP | |
| Petz: Dogz Talent Show | Ubisoft Nagoya | Ubisoft | 2009 | DS | |
| Petz Nursery | Ubisoft | Ubisoft | 2009 | DS | |
| Petz: Pony Beauty Pageant (Note: Published in France as Poney Club by Alexandra Ledermann, part of the Alexandra Ledermann series. Published elsewhere in Europe as Petz: Pony Club) | HotGen | Ubisoft | 2009 | DS | |
| Petz Nursery 2 | Ubisoft | Ubisoft | 2010 | DS | |
| Petz: Horsez Family | Ubisoft | Ubisoft | 2010 | DS | |
| Petz: Catz Playground | Ubisoft | Ubisoft | 2010 | DS | |
| Petz: Dogz Family | Ubisoft | Ubisoft | 2010 | DSiWare | |
| Petz Hamsterz Family | Ubisoft | Ubisoft | 2010 | DSiWare | |
| Petz Kittens | Ubisoft | Ubisoft | 2010 | DSiWare | |
| Petz Fantasy: Moonlight Magic | Ubisoft | Ubisoft | 2010 | DS | |
| Petz Fantasy: Sunshine Magic | Ubisoft | Ubisoft | 2010 | DS | |
| Petz Fantasy 3D | Ubisoft | Ubisoft | 2011 | 3DS | |
| Petz: Puppyz & Kittenz | Ubisoft | Ubisoft | 2011 | DS | |
| Petz Beach | Ubisoft | Ubisoft | 2014 | 3DS | |
| Petz Countryside | Ubisoft | Ubisoft | 2014 | 3DS | |

== Reception ==
Aggregate review scores As of 24 October 2024.
| Game | GameRankings | Metacritic |
|---|---|---|
| Dogz | GBC: 49% | |
| Catz | GBC: 44% | |
| Dogz | GBA: 49% DS: 66% | GBA: 48/100 |
| Catz | DS: 51% | |
| Hamsterz Life | DS: 72% | |
| Horsez | DS: 50% | |
| Petz: Horse Club | Wii: 58% | |
| Petz Rescue: Ocean Patrol | DS: 80% | |
| Petz Rescue: Wildlife Vet | Wii: 80% | |
| Petz Sports: Dog Playground | Wii: 63% | |
| Petz: Dogz Family | DS: 38% | |

The original software was generally well received, with The Salt Lake Tribune giving 1995's Dogz 4 out of 5 stars, and PC Zone and Entertainment Weekly giving Catz an 8/10 and B+ respectively. However, later games were less well received, in particularly compared to other virtual pet experiences that were available, with the 1999 Game Boy Color games negatively compared to Tamagotchi, and 2005's Dogz for the Game Boy Advance, being seen as an attempt to ape Nintendogs.

By 2007, Joystiq recommended buying games in the series only for "people you hate". On the other hand, a 2008 feature in Game Developer opined that Ubisoft's "casual titles"—specifically mentioning the Petz and Imagine series—had distinguished themselves by being "well-made non-shovelware" that didn't try to "take advantage of the innocence of the target market."

The Petz games developed by P.F. Magic grew a dedicated online community that, including a community of "Hexers", who would edit the games files to create custom petz. Game designer Nathalie Lawhead speculates this was part of the reason for its success and enduring legacy.

=== Sales ===
The original Dogz and Catz sold around 200,000, in their first year on the market, and would go on to sell—along with their sequels Catz and Dogz II—1.5 million copies. By the time of PF.Magic's purchase by Mindscape, the series had made over $8 million. The series as a whole has now sold more than 24 million copies.

== See also ==
- Babyz
- Nintendogs
- Tamagotchi
- Creatures
