= Petz Sports: Dog Playground =

2008 video game

Petz Sports
- Developer: Ubisoft Montreal
- Publisher: Ubisoft
- Platforms: Wii, Mac OS, Microsoft Windows
- Release: 2008
- Genre: Virtual life
- Modes: Single-player, multiplayer

Petz Sports: Dog Playground (Petz Sports in North America) is a sim game released for Wii, Mac OS and Microsoft Windows. It was developed and published by Ubisoft and released in 2008.

== Gameplay ==
Petz Sports is a sim game designed for 1 to 4 players and revolves around caring for a puppy. The puppy grows throughout the game.

Key features include:

- 18 dog breeds, including Bernese Mountain Dog, Chihuahua, Golden Retriever, Rottweiler, Poodle, and Pug.
- 22 tricks
- 36 agility courses

Dogs can be dressed up with various unlockable hair coat types and items. Up to four friends can play, and by using Wii Remotes in the Wii version, dogs can be exchanged.

== Reviews ==
Reception

Aggregate score
Aggregator	Score
GameRankings	63%

Review scores
Publication	Score
GameZone	7.5
IGN	5.0

Petz Sports: Dog Playground received mixed reviews upon release, with the review aggregator website GameRankings, assigning it a score 63%, based on 2 critics. GameZone described the game as a "solid entry" to the Petz franchise, highlighting the variety of activities and "personality" of the dogs, although finding the racing gameplay "simplistic" and writing that it "could be fleshed out more". Lucas Thomas of IGN similarly praised the "expressive and fun" animations of the dogs, but found the minigame design "tiring and repetitive" and the game's loading times "unattractive".
