= Petz: Dogz 2 and Catz 2 (adventure games) =

Petz: Dogz 2 Petz: Catz 2
- Wii cover art of the two versions; Petz: Dogz 2 (left), Petz: Catz 2 (right)
- Developer: Yuke's
- Publisher: Ubisoft
- Platforms: PlayStation 2, Wii
- Release: 2007
- Genres: Adventure, Role playing

Petz: Dogz 2 and Petz: Catz 2 are a pair of 2007 role playing adventure games for the PlayStation 2 and Wii, in the Petz series. In Europe, these games are titled Dogz and Catz. Developed by Yuke's, the games were originally released in Japan under the names Nyanko to Mahou no Boushi (にゃんこと魔法のぼうし, lit. 'The Kitten and the Magic Hat') and Wanko to Mahou no Boushi (わんこと魔法のぼうし, lit. 'The Puppy and the Magic Hat') respectively.

== Gameplay ==
The game is similar to The Dog Island, in which the player controls a dog or cat through environments while completing tasks. Before the game starts, the player is asked to choose the animal's breed, gender, and finally, name, all of which have no bearing in the game itself. The player can walk, run, creep, and push rocks as locomotion. Throughout the game, the player faces a variety of hostile animals, such as snakes, gorillas, bats, and others, who will hurt the player if they tread too closely. When an enemy attacks, the bubble indicating their mood above their head changes. The player starts out at 3 HP, which is upgraded at certain points in the game up to 8; if all of them are depleted, the player has to start over from the last save point. The player can stun enemies by barking/meowing behind them, which can be held down for a longer effect (in the dog's case, it will turn their bark into a howl), or by throwing pebbles against them. Bubbles appear above friendly non-playable characters as well to indicate that they need the player's help for a task.

The player can explore 14 locales in the game, including the beach "Dolphin Coast", lake "Lappy Lake", forest "Whisker Woods", and so on. Not all of them are open for the player at the start, requiring specific tasks to be completed first. While the player will visit every area at one point in the game, many parts are optional and can be opened by skills obtained later in the game. Once the player earns the Warp Ring from Arvin (the player character's father) they can warp between six locales for free through a magical stone normally used for saving. Each area has its own hazards independent from the hostile animals, such as a poisonous lake in Sky Heights, overheating in Inferno Cave, and tornadoes in Lonesome Park. Some areas host zoo animals that can be challenged for mini-games, including soccer and sprint, to make them return to South Pawville's zoo, where the player can challenge them again. The game is tightly knit as compared to The Dog Island; South Pawville acts as a central hub that connects all branches of the island. Due to this, there is no traveler's inn or shop; every purchase and full healing through sleeping are therefore only conductible in South Pawville.

The game has a variety of obtainable items. Fruits, vegetables, and plot-related items are collected by sniffing and digging them (availability and location of the items are indicated in two circles that appear when the player are sniffing). The player can catch butterflies, insects, and fishes, each of which can be sold at the pawn shop in South Pawville for gold, or, in the case of fishes, sent to the aquarium for later viewing. Gold, the game's currency, is also received as reward for completing tasks and can be spent to buy healing items, accessories, and clothing.

The dog and cat editions of the game have virtually identical content, aside from the different animals populating them and certain theme naming (e.g. healing items in the game are named after meat for dogs, but tunas for cats).

== Plot ==
The player is a dog or cat living in South Pawville, a town located on a large island. The player's father, Arvin, owns the Magic Hat, a family inheritance that contains a powerful magic, which can be used for good or evil. When the player's best friend Victor talks about an evil wolf named Ivlet jailed at North Pawville's police station, he invites the player to investigate. Sheriff Ada warns them against nearing Ivlet, who usually sleeps during the day. This gives Victor idea of visiting him at night.

When the two visit Ivlet that night, he tricks the player into giving him the Magic Hat. This empowers him with magic, which he uses to destroy both Pawvilles and make wild animals hostile. Ada jails the player, but is freed by Augusta, who says that the player should take responsibility by helping the townsfolk, while Victor decides to take the player's place as a compromise. Outside the police station, the player meets with Beat, the personification of the Magic Hat's good side, who asks for the player's help in retrieving back the hat.

After the player helps out all of the Pawvilles' townsfolk, they are instructed by Arvin to meet with and assist Theophilus, a wizard living in Sky Heights, in combating Ivlet. Theophilus says that the Magic Hat, normally colored blue, grows darker if always used for evil, and if it turns black, it will corrupt its user into a monster. Suppressing the hat's power requires the Magic Shield, made from three crystals: the Water, Earth, and Ice Crystals. Once the player collects them, Theophilus sends the player to rendezvous with his brother, Bartholomew, who travelled to Gongoro Peak but did not return. The two wizards proceed to Sky Heights and plan the attack on Ivlet, who lives in an astral dimension, and invite the player to assist them. The three manage to defeat Ivlet and the dragon he summons.

Retrieving back the Magic Hat, Beat says that since his task is done, he will have to part ways with the player, before entering the Magic Hat and returning it back to its normal color. The player returns home and is welcomed by their parents, with Arvin deciding to pass the Magic Hat to the player.

== Reception ==
Reception
Petz: Catz 2

Review scores
Publication	Score	
Publication	PS2	Wii
IGN	6/10	6/10
Jeuxvideo.com	7/10	8/10
Children's Technology Review		20%

Petz: Dogz 2

Review score
Publication	Score	
Publication	PS2	Wii
Jeuxvideo.com	7/10	8/10
