= Dogz (2005 video game) =

- Game Boy Advance boxart
- Developers: MTO; Backbone Entertainment
- Publisher: Ubisoft
- Platforms: Game Boy Advance, Nintendo DS
- Release: JP: 25 November 2004; NA: 17 November 2005; UK: 9 December 2005
- Genre: virtual pet

Dogz is a virtual pet and pet simulation game in the Petz series, released for the Game Boy Advance, in 2005, and Nintendo DS, in 2006. It is a localisation of the Japanese game Kawaii Koinu Wonderful (かわいい仔犬 ワンダフル, lit. 'Cute Puppy Wonderful'), released in November 2004, and developed by MTO as part of the Nakayoshi Pet series. Unlike other games in the Petz series the player controls a playable character in an Isometric world.

It is a distinct game from the Catz games released on the Game Boy Advance and DS, as well as the previous Dogz game released for Game Boy Color.

== Gameplay ==
The player character, in the centre, is speaking to his dog, with his parents on either side. The game being presented in an Isometric perspective and including dialogue, sets it apart from previous Petz games.

As in previous games in the Petz series, the player begins the game by adopting a dog giving it a name, and "training" it. However, unlike previous games in the series, the action is presented in an Isometric perspective and with a player avatar performing the player's action. The game also has dialogue with the player character's family, who coach the player in how to look after the animal. The game's simulation runs with a daily cycle, with non pet related chores—changing music, switching on and off a television, tidying up, vacuuming—being included as minigames.

== Reception ==
Reception

Aggregate scores
Aggregator	Score	
Aggregator	DS	GBA
GameRankings	66%	49%
Metacritic		48/100

Review scores
Publication	Score	
Publication	DS	GBA
Eurogamer		2/10
Game Informer		5.5/10
GameSpy		2/5 stars
GameZone		6.5/10
Jeuxvideo.com	10/20	10/20
NGC Magazine		38/100

As the western localisation arrived only half a year after Nintendo's extremely popular Virtual pet game Nintendogs, many reviewers saw Dogz as Ubisoft's attempt to cash in a trend and thought it unfavourably compared that game. Mark Green, of NGC Magazine, thought it was overly simplified, and about "as fun to pick up and play as a tennis ball sticky with dog slobber." He also felt the choice to have the pet be owned by an intermediary player avatar made it difficult to bond with the animals. A review in Eurogamer found the interactivity and controls asinine. Matt Helgeson, of Game Informer, opined while there was "a fair amount of depth" in the actions performable with the dog, the mechanics seemed "awkward and static".

The DS port was seen as very similar to the GBA version, with Jeuxvideo.com, criticizing the lack of use of the two screens of the handheld.

== Dogz 2 ==
In 2007, Ubisoft issued a game called Dogz 2 for the Game Boy Advance, which was in fact mostly a reissue of Dogz—featuring exactly the same story and graphics—but with six additional breeds of dog and added minigames. The reviewer for Jeuxvideo thought the attempt to pass of what, in their view, was no better than a reissue as a sequel was "scandalous".
