= Furby, Sweden =

Locality in Sweden

Coordinates: 59°38′N 16°41′E

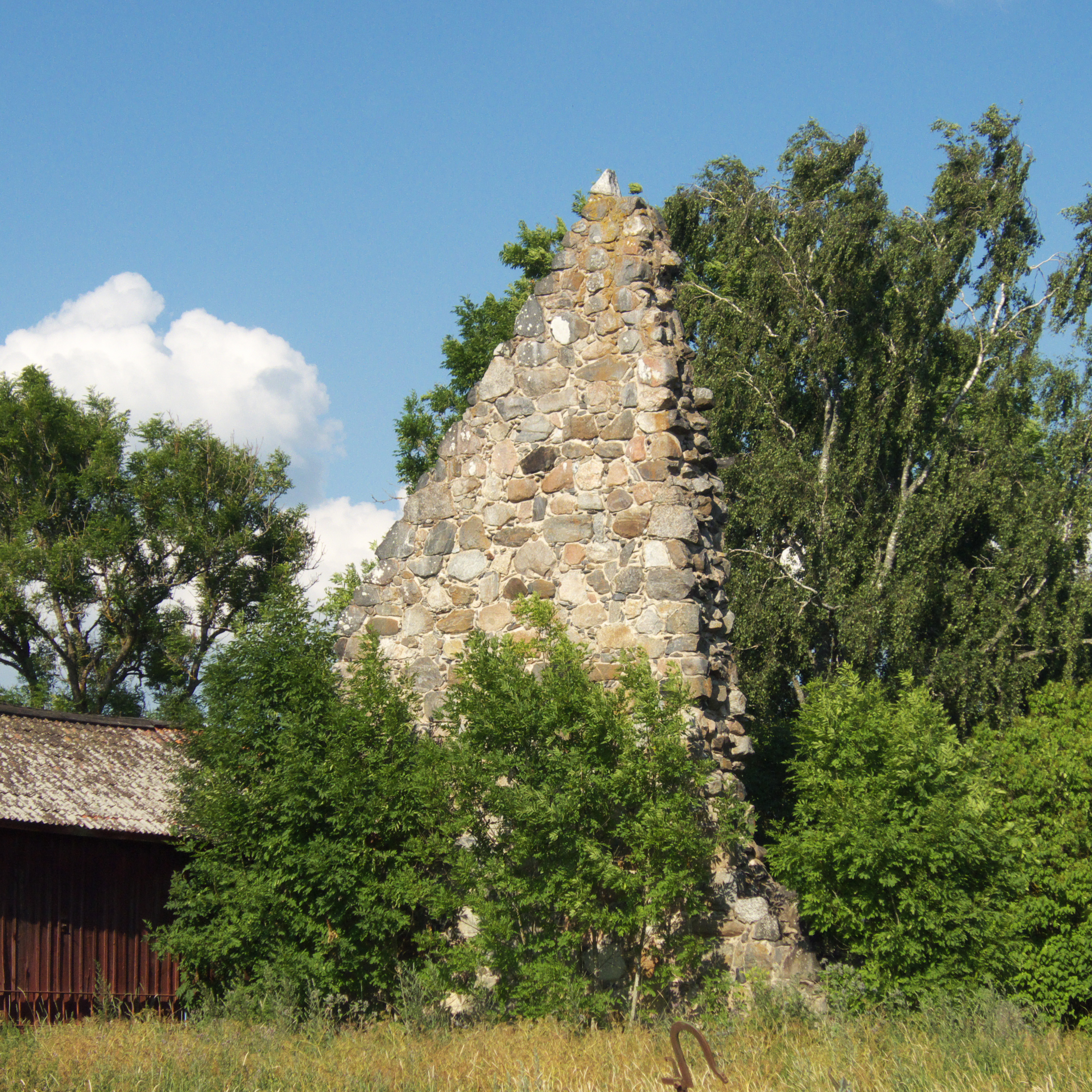
The Furby church ruin

Furby (from fura 'pine' + by 'village') was a parish in an area currently located in Badelunda parish, Västerås Municipality, Sweden. The parish consisted of four larger villages or homesteads - Ingeberga, Berga, Tuna and Närlunda. Furby parish was merged with Badelunda parish in the 16th century. Now only a church ruin remains. Furby is a few miles north of Lake Mälaren and near Anundshögen, the ship burial mound of legendary Swedish king Anund. Today Furby is now a historical site.
