= PF.Magic =

American video game developer

PF.Magic, Inc. was a video game developer founded in 1991 and located in San Francisco, California, United States. Though it developed other types of video games, it was best known for its virtual pet games, such as Dogz and Catz. The company was able to make extra revenue by selling plush toys under the Petz trademark. It was bought out in 1998 by Mindscape, Inc. After changing hands a few more times, Ubisoft now owns the copyright on its Petz, Oddballz and Babyz titles.

One of PF.Magic's earliest efforts was the 1994 video game Ballz, published by Accolade. The innovative game featured main characters composed completely of spheres. This early game failed in the marketplace, though it would inspire many of their following games, such as Petz.

PF.Magic's designer and programmer, Andrew Stern, created an experimental project with Michael Mateas and others for five years. The project became Façade, a freeware game in which the player interacts with a couple whose ten-year marriage is in trouble.

== History ==
PF.Magic was born out of a failed hardware venture with AT&T and Sega to build a Sega Genesis accessory called "The Edge", which was to allow for online multiplayer over telephone lines. AT&T pulled out of the venture due to the cost of the device, leaving the company with half their initial funding. The company's predecessor was Interactive Productions, a company Fulop had founded in Foster City after his stints at Atari and Imagic.

With their hardware project cancelled, the company needed a new product to work on. Co-founder Rob Fulop saw the controversy generated by Night Trap, a game he worked on, and wanted to make something that was the complete opposite of it. Fulop talked with a mall Santa who told him that the number one gift children requested for Christmas was still a puppy. After this conversation, the idea of doing a title about animals came about, resulting in Petz, which was based on the graphics technology they previously used in Ballz. Petz was an enormous success, became one of the company's flagship products and has been credited with popularizing virtual pets.

== Selected titles ==
=== Ballz ===
Ballz is a two-player 3D action fighting game for the Sega Mega Drive/Genesis, the Super Nintendo Entertainment System, and the 3DO. It was developed by PF.Magic and published by Accolade in 1994. The 3DO version was released as a director's cut in 1995. Ballz offered three difficulty levels over a total of 21 matches. Its distinguishing quality was that each of the characters were composed completely of balls, with a pseudo-3D look.

=== Petz ===
Petz (Dogz and Catz) is a series of games dating back to 1995, designed by Adam C. Frank and Ben Resner. The player can adopt, raise, care for and breed their own virtual pets. The original Petz has sold over 3 million copies worldwide, and the brand has grown to over 22 million copies since coming under Ubisoft.

The player starts at the Adoption Center and chooses a Dogz or Catz to adopt of a Breedz and gender of their choice. Once the player has found a Petz, the user can adopt and name the new Puppyz or Kittenz. After around three days (real time) the Petz become adults. Adult Petz can then breed and have Kittenz or Puppyz of their own in Petz 3, Petz 4, and Petz 5. Cross-breeding can create different types of Petz, called 'Mixed Breeds'.

=== Oddballz ===
Oddballz is a virtual pet game created by PF.Magic in 1996 as an alternative to their Dogz and Catz titles. The game had 13 creatures that could be cared for. Along with the creatures, the game has various objects ('toyz') that the player and Oddballz can manipulate. Toyz have different uses ranging from playing to disciplining.

=== Babyz ===
Babyz is a computer game in which one can play with and take care of a group of babies who live in a virtual house on the computer. The game was released in 1999 by The Learning Company, developed by members of PF.Magic working there at the time.
