= Horsez =

2006 video game

- Developers: Lexis Numérique; Virtual Toys
- Publisher: Ubisoft
- Series: Petz
- Platforms: Game Boy Advance, Nintendo DS, PlayStation 2, Windows
- Release: Nintendo DS: PAL: October 26, 2006; NA: November 28, 2006; PlayStation 2: PAL: November 2, 2006; NA: November 14, 2006; Windows: PAL: November 2, 2006; NA: November 16, 2006; Game Boy Advance: NA: July 2, 2007
- Genre: Strategy
- Mode: Single-player

Horsez refers to one of four video games released by Ubisoft in 2006, as part of the Petz series, for Nintendo DS, PlayStation 2, PC and Game Boy Advance. Developed as various entries in Lexis Numérique's Alexandra Ledermann series, they were originally released as: for the PS2, Alexandra Ledermann 6; for the PC, Alexandra Ledermann 7; for the DS, Alexandra Ledermann: Adventures at a gallop; and for GBA, DTP Entertainment's Pferd & Pony: Mein Gestüt.

== Plot ==
The user plays as Flower (the default name), a new member of the Sycamore Academy. Players select a horse from one of four breeds and a range of colours. The player trains their horse in different disciplines, enters shows, cares for the horse, and after a few weeks gains a foal to raise.

== Gameplay ==
The player arranges a timetable so that they can pass each week. To pass, they must obtain a certain score out of 10 for each of the disciplines, and must train in that discipline at least twice a week. The disciplines are Horse Care, Cross Country, Dressage, Showjumping, and later Foal Care and Learning. The player must also have a high social rating, which is obtained by spending time in the Student Centre talking to other academy riders, performing well in disciplines, taking and displaying photographs in the Student Centre, and purchasing items from the shops. Between training and caring for their horse, foal, and talking to the other riders, the player may go shopping, change their attire in their bedroom, study in the library, and go for a walk with their horse. There is a total of ten secret figurines hidden in the game.

Throughout the game, the player is given free control of the protagonist or the horse. There are numerous cutscenes, events where the player character must find something, and riddles. These events, combined with the contrasting disciplines, ensure variable gameplay.

=== Disciplines ===
- Horse Care: Taking care of a horse. Horse Care includes hosing, grooming, picking his hooves, and mucking his stall. It is best to do this at least 3 times a week.
- Cross Country: The player canters the horse around the course.
- Dressage: The player presses the left and right arrow keys in time to make your horse perform the correct gait. Other keys are also used to control the horse. Gaits must be learned from library books before the horse can perform them.
- Showjumping: A fairly difficult discipline to master.
- Foal Care: Once the player has a foal, they must take care of it. During Foal Care, the foal will perform three actions. The player needs to guess what the foal wants based on what it does. The foal's actions can be analyzed by reading library books.
- Learning: Once the player has the foal, they need to raise it. Learning involves teaching the foal different gaits.

== Reception ==
Reception

Review scores
Publication	Score		
Publication	DS	PC	PS2
GameZone	5.6/10		
IGN	4/10		2.1/10
Jeuxvideo.com	7/20	11/20	11/20

== Horsez 2 ==
A sequel to Horsez was developed with somewhat similar plots: the main character is a young woman named Emma. She is sent to France to train to become a veterinarian. When the taxi breaks down, she has no choice but to take refuge in a small, quiet town. There, she meets Oliver, a nephew of his aunt's stud farm, who is missing its real owner, Marie. After finding out Emma is a vet, he offers to give her shelter if she helps them deliver a mare with foal, and Emma agrees. After meeting Flora, Michael (formerly called Miguel in Horsez), and Carol, Emma is given some objectives. The character delivers a healthy foal, and then is given the choice of the player to stay with the stud farm or leave as a vet. The game continues either way.

In the end, the characters win back the stud farm, though end results are dependent on the player's choices throughout the game. In one part, Emma finds out that Marie is still alive and well. In this ending she leaves the stud farm to Flora, and promises to visit soon, having settled in New Zealand. Other possible endings include Emma getting Oliver (and herself) tickets to the US so she can show him her country, and Emma and Oliver sharing a kiss on the beach.
