= Dogz and Catz =

Dogz: Your Computer Pet Catz: Your Computer Petz
- Original PC cover art of the two versions; Dogz (left), Catz (right)
- Developer: PF.Magic
- Publisher: PF.Magic
- Platforms: PC, Mac
- Release: 1995 (Dogz), 1996 (Catz)
- Genre: virtual pet

Dogz: Your Computer Pet and Catz: Your Computer Petz are a pair of virtual pet simulation software developed and published by PF.Magic, and released in 1995 and 1996 respectively. Developed for Windows and Mac OS, they were the first games in the Petz series, and were followed by Oddballz.

== Gameplay ==
Upon starting the program the user is prompted to "adopt" one of 5 animals. In Dogz you get a choice between a bull dog, terrier, scotty, setter or chihuahua, whereas Catz presents the player with 5 differently-colored cats based on cat stereotypes (such as a 'scaredy cat', a serious hunter, or a snooty Siamese-like cat). Before choosing one you get a chance to play with each to get a feel for its personality. after that you can name and even paint your selected individual. From there the user interacts with the animals on the desktop. Depending on how the animals are interacted with they will change their mood and over time their personality. Actions include calling your animal, feeding and watering them, playing with toys, and disciplining bad behaviour.

The software can also be used as a screensaver, with optional password protection, with the Dog (in the case of Dogz) barking at those trying to get in.

== Development ==
I decided then and there to make something so incredibly cute, that nobody could point to it and cry 'foul' again—least of all Captain Kangaroo [Bob Keeshan, who spoke against Night Trap]—thus the digital puppy game was born.

— Rob Fulop

PF.Magic's co-founder Rob Fulop had previously worked on the FMV game Night Trap. That work had been subject to an intense controversy, for allegedly promoting gratuitous violence, and was even one the subjects of a hearing on video games by the United States Senate. After seeing the response, which Fulop considered "completely bullshit", and having it impact relationships with friends and family, he vowed to make something that nobody could possibly find objectionable. In his own words he tried to find the "most sissy game that [he] could come out with". He also was inspired by a discussion he had with a mall Santa, about what children where asking for, for Christmas, which was "the same [...] thing that kids ask for every year," a puppy.

The game reused the rendering technology previously developed for the PF.Magic fighting game Ballz, in which all the characters made were made of connected spheres.

The concept of virtual pets allowed the development team to experiment with creating "interactive, real-time autonomous characters", as cats and dogs acted in ways that the team thought simple enough to successfully implement. When developing the user-pet interaction, a stated design goal was to not penalize users for "doing something wrong", instead putting the focus on user story telling.

== Reception ==
Reception
Dogz

Review score
Publication	Score
The Salt Lake Tribune	4/5 stars

Catz

Review scores
Publication	Score
AllGame	3/5 stars
PC Zone	8.0/10
Entertainment Weekly	B+

Reviewing Dogz for The Salt Lake Tribune, Kim McDaniel gave the game 4 out of 5 stars, praising its believability of the animals, and the feeling that they learn and grow over time. In the Herald News, Robert Phillips, thought that it was "pretty good" and would make a great stocking stuffer. Courtney Blodgett, of The Republican, felt it would be great for somebody who was unable to keep pets. CNET's review of the software thought that while it wasn't as ambitious or groundbreaking as previous pet simulator El Fish, it was fun. According to Wired it amounted to "little more than an interactive screensaver".

In a review for Catz, Violet Berlin gave the game a score of 9/20, opining that the experience was "completely pointless" and "amusing for all of three minutes". Entertainment Weekly's Bob Strauss was more positive giving Catz a B+, complementing the fidelity to the real animals.

== Sales and legacy ==
Dogz was an immediate success on release, with around 200,000 copies selling in the first year. By the beginning of 1998 Catz, Dogz and their sequels—Catz and Dogz II: Your Virtual Petz—had collectively sold more than 1.5 million units. According to Margaret Wallace, an employee of PF.Magic's at the time, customer data showed that the dominant users of Catz and Dogz were women and girls.

The game and its immediate sequels would go on to inspire a large online community. This is something that the developers looked to cultivate from the beginning, including in built photo taking as a way to drive traffic to their website, and to the purchasable kits for sale there.

Following the success of the first two games PF.Magic developed Oddballz, following the same virtual pets mould, but with imagined creatures "such as a cross between a walrus and a rabbit".

=== Game Boy Color ports ===
In 1999, Mindscape published ports of both Dogz and Catz, developed by Saffire, for the Game Boy Color. The graphics and gameplay are ported as close to the original as is possible on the handheld, with added unlockable animal breeds and toys. The game was generally negatively received, when compared to the PC versions, with an aggregated GameRankings score of 49% and 44% respectively. Craig Harris, of IGN, thought that while more elaborate than Tamagotchi, the inability of Game Boy games to multitask and amount of batteries the system used made the Tamagotchi a much more compelling virtual pet experience. Likewise GameSpot's Doug Trueman wrote that anybody who saw themselves as "a gamer [would] probably view this title as little more than a drain on battery power.". Nintendo Power gave both games a score of 6.2 out of 10.
