= Virtual pet =

Type of artificial human companion

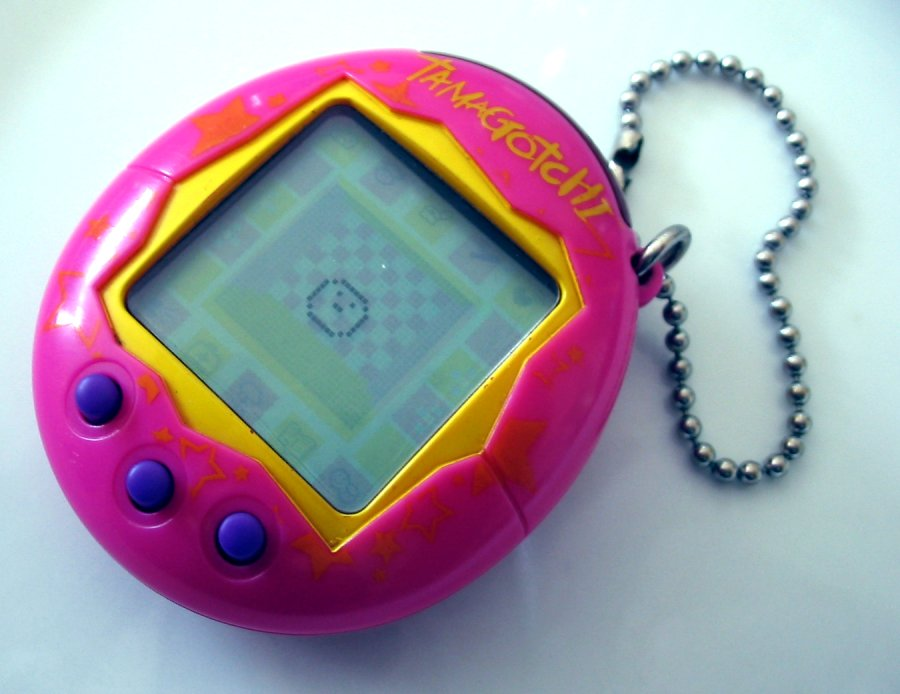
A Tamagotchi virtual pet

A virtual pet (also known as a digital pet, artificial pet, or pet-raising simulation) is a type of artificial human companion. They are usually kept for companionship or enjoyment, or as an alternative to a real pet.

Digital pets have no concrete physical form other than the hardware they run on. Interaction with virtual pets may or may not be goal oriented. If it is, then the user must keep it alive as long as possible and often help it to grow into higher forms. Keeping the pet alive and growing often requires feeding, grooming and playing with the pet. Some digital pets require more than just food to keep them alive. Daily interaction is required in the form of playing games, virtual petting, providing love and acknowledgment can help keep the user's virtual pet happy and growing healthy.

Digital pets can be simulations of real animals, as in the Petz series, or fantasy ones, like the Tamagotchi or Digimon series. Unlike biological simulations, the pet does not usually reproduce.

== Types ==
=== Web-based ===
Virtual pet sites are usually free to play for all who sign up. They can be accessed through web browsers and often include a virtual community, such as Neopia in Neopets. In these worlds, a user can play games to earn virtual money which is usually spent on items and food for pets. One large branch of virtual pet games are sim horse games.

Some sites adopt out pets to put on a webpage and use for role-playing in chat rooms. They often require the adoptee to have a page ready for their pet. Sometimes they have a setup for breeding one's pets and then adopting them out.

=== Software-based ===
There are many video games that focus on the care, raising, breeding or exhibition of simulated animals. Such games are described as a sub-class of life simulation game. Since the computing power is more powerful than with webpage or gadget based digital pets, these are usually able to achieve a higher level of visual effects and interactivity. Pet-raising simulations often lack a victory condition or challenge, and can be classified as software toys.

The pet may be capable of learning to do a variety of tasks. "This quality of rich intelligence distinguishes artificial pets from other kinds of A-life, in which individuals have simple rules but the population as a whole develops emergent properties". For artificial pets, their behaviors are typically "preprogrammed and are not truly emergent".

A screen mate is a downloadable virtual pet that creates a small animation that walks around a computer desktop and over open screens unpredictably. Each pet is a small animation of an animal (such as a sheep or a frog, or in some cases a human or bottle cap) that can be interacted by clicking on or dragging, which lifts the pet as if you were picking it up. Most screen mates are free to download and used for entertainment purposes.

== History ==
The first-known virtual pet was a screen-cursor chasing cat called Neko. It was rather called a "desktop pet" since at that time the term "virtual pet" did not exist.

PF.Magic released the first widely popular virtual pets in 1995 with Dogz, followed by Catz in the spring of 1996, eventually becoming a franchise known as Petz. The digital pets were further popularized when Tamagotchi and Digimon were introduced in 1996 and 1997.

Digital pets like Tamagotchi and Digimon were a massive fad across Japan, the United States and United Kingdom during the late 1990s. Later entertainment robots had physical bodies.

From the late 1990s to the early 2000s, virtual pets specialized to be official mascots of personal websites known as "cyber pets" (or "cyberpets") could be especially seen in websites hosted with GeoCities, Tripod, or Angelfire. There were also webpages which allowed users to "adopt" cyber pets for their websites.

== Controversy ==
In the 1990s, the constant need for attention the pets required, and the intense emotions children formed regarding the pets, led to them being banned from multiple schools in the United States and South Korea. In Japan, a black market emerged for valuable Tamagotchis.

A Mad cover on regular issue #362, October 1997 shows a gun being pointed at a virtual pet with Alfred E. Neuman's face and the line "If you don't buy this magazine, we'll kill this virtual pet!" Illustrated by Mark Fredrickson. The cover parodies the January 1973 issue of National Lampoon which depicted a gun being held to a real dog's head and the line, "If you don't buy this magazine, we'll kill this dog."

=== Relationship with digital pet ===
There is research concerning the relationship between digital pets and their owners, and their impact on the emotions of people. For example, Furby affects the way people think about their identity, and many children think that Furby is alive in a "Furby kind of way" in Sherry Turkle's research. Author Paul Spangenberg wrote that the decline in popularity of virtual pets could be linked to the negative emotions a player feels if their pets dies, writing: "Who want to be guilty of killing a pet-even a pretend pet?"

== Common features ==
There are many common features between different digital pets, some of them are used to give a sense of reality to the user (such as the pet responding to "touch"), and some for enhancing playability (such as training).

=== Communication ===
With advanced video gaming technology, most modern digital pets do not show a message box nor icon to display the pet's internal variable, health state or emotion like earlier generations (such as Tamagotchi). Instead, users can only understand the pet by interpreting their actions, body language, facial expressions, etc. This helps to make a pet's behavior seem natural, rather than calculated, and fosters a feeling of a relationship between user and digital pet.

=== Sense of reality ===
To give a sense of reality to users, most digital pets have certain level of autonomy and unpredictability. The user can interact with the pet and this process of personalizing can make the pet more distinctive. Personalizing increases the feeling of responsibility for the pet to the user. For example, if a Tamagotchi is unattended for long enough, it will become "sick" and, if neglected further, "die". This constant need, and the consequences of failing to meet such needs, make the virtual pet seem more real than other toys. In the Petz games, animals cannot die, but they can display behaviors to alert the owner of their needs, such as becoming obese when overfed or howling when in need of attention.

=== Interactivity ===
Some virtual pets, such as the Nintendogs, react to spoken commands via a microphone built into the console being played on. As speech recognition can be limited, a virtual pet game may incorporate this into the game itself, explaining the failure to process the player's speech as the pet failing to understand a command. Some games allow one to touch their pet using a stylus.

== See also ==
- List of virtual pet games
- AIBO
- Animals in video games
