= List of Nintendo DS games (D–I) =

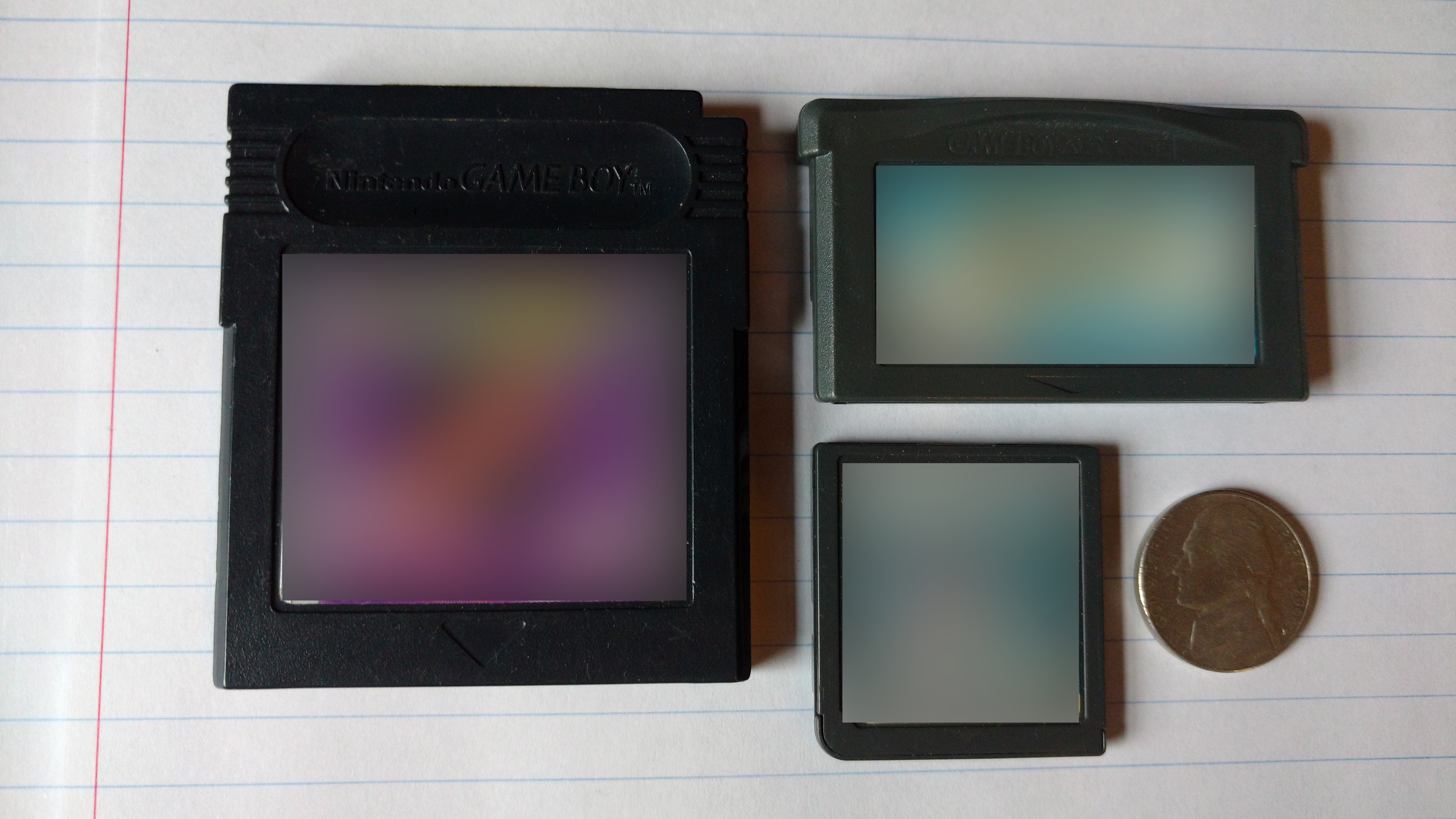
Clockwise from left: A Game Boy game cartridge, a Game Boy Advance game cartridge, and a Nintendo DS game card. On the far right is a United States Nickel shown for scale.

This is a list of physical video games for the Nintendo DS, DS Lite, and DSi handheld game consoles. It does not include games released on DSiWare or the iQue DS. The last game for the Nintendo DS, Big Hero 6: Battle in the Bay, was released on October 28, 2014.

== Games ==
There are currently 3241 games in this table across all pages: 0 to C, D to I, J to P, and Q to Z.

Title	Developer(s)	Publisher(s)	First released	JP	NA	EU	AU
D & CO: Ta maison de reve en 7 jours	Atari SA	Atari SA	March 19, 2009 (EU)	No	No	Yes	No
D.Gray-man: Kami no Shitotachi	Konami	Konami	March 29, 2007 (JP)	Yes	No	No	No
DaGeDar	Black Lantern Studios	GameMill Publishing	November 8, 2011 (US)	No	Yes	No	No
Daigasso! Band Brothers Tsuika Kyoku Cartridge	Nintendo	Nintendo	September 26, 2005 (JP)	Yes	No	No	No
Daigasso! Band-Brothers	Nintendo	Nintendo	December 2, 2004 (JP)	Yes	No	No	No
Daikoukai Jidai IV: Rota Nova	Koei	Koei	March 2, 2006 (JP)	Yes	No	No	No
Daisenryaku DS	Genki	Genki	May 25, 2006 (JP)	Yes	No	No	No
Daito Giken Koushiki Pachi-Slot Simulator: Hihouden - Ossu! Banchou - Yoshimune DS	Paon Corporation	Paon Corporation	April 26, 2007 (JP)	Yes	No	No	No
Dance Floor	Artefacts Studio	Neko Entertainment	January 15, 2009 (EU)	No	No	Yes	No
Dance! It's Your Stage	Sproing	DTP Entertainment	August 13, 2010 (EU)	No	No	Yes	No
Dancing on Ice	Ghostlight	Ghostlight	April 23, 2010 (EU)	No	No	Yes	No
Dancing with the Stars: We Dance!	Jet Black Games	Activision	October 12, 2008 (NA)	No	Yes	No	No
Daniel X: The Ultimate Power	Griptonite Games	THQ	January 12, 2010 (NA)	No	Yes	No	No
Danny Phantom: Urban Jungle	Altron	THQ	September 19, 2006 (NA)	No	Yes	Yes	No
Daredemo Asobi Taizen	Agenda	Nintendo	November 3, 2005 (JP)	Yes	No	No	No
Daredemo Kantan! Chou Chikun no Tsumego	Mycom	Mycom	September 14, 2006 (JP)	Yes	No	No	No
Daredemo Kantan! Watanabe Akira no Tsume Shogi	Mycom	Mycom	December 21, 2006 (JP)	Yes	No	No	No
The Daring Game for Girls	WXP	Majesco	March 9, 2010 (NA)	No	Yes	No	No
The Dark Spire	Success	Atlus, Success	May 22, 2008 (JP)	Yes	Yes	No	No
Das goldene Amulett des Pharao	Tivola	Tivola	April 8, 2010 (EU)	No	No	Yes	No
Das grosse Tagesschau Quiz	Cranberry Production	DTP Entertainment	September 7, 2009 (EU)	No	No	Yes	No
Das Magische Labyrinth	Nurogames	Kiddinx	February 9, 2010 (EU)	No	No	Yes	No
Date ni Game Tsui Wake Jane! Dungeon Maker Girls Type	Global A	Idea Factory	October 29, 2009 (JP)	Yes	No	No	No
Datenshi no Amai Yuuwaku x Kaikan Phase	FuRyu	FuRyu	February 18, 2010 (JP)	Yes	No	No	No
Dawn of Discovery; Anno: Create A New World^{EU}	Keen Games	Ubisoft	May 22, 2009 (EU)	No	Yes	Yes	No
Dawn of Heroes	Wicked Studios	Majesco	September 13, 2010 (NA)	No	Yes	No	No
Days of Memories	SNK Playmore	SNK Playmore	June 14, 2007 (JP)	Yes	No	No	No
Days of Memories 2	SNK Playmore	SNK Playmore	April 24, 2008 (JP)	Yes	No	No	No
Days of Memories 3	SNK Playmore	SNK Playmore	May 28, 2009 (JP)	Yes	No	No	No
De Blob 2	Halfbrick	THQ	February 22, 2011 (NA)	No	Yes	Yes	Yes
Deal or no Deal (Australia version)	Mindscape	Mindscape	December 10, 2008 (AUS)	No	No	No	Yes
Deal or No Deal (US Version)	Gravity-i	Destination Software	July 23, 2007 (NA)	No	Yes	No	No
Deal or No Deal: Special Edition	Gravity-i	Destination Software	September 13, 2010 (NA)	No	Yes	No	No
Deal or No Deal: The Banker is Back! Deal or no Deal: Der Banker Schlaegt Zurueck ^{DE}	Gravity-i	Mindscape	November 14, 2008 (EU)	No	No	Yes	No
Deal or no Deal: The Official Nintendo DS Game; Affari tuoi ^{IT} Le Jeu Officiel: A Prendre ou A Laisser ^{FR}	Mindscape	Mindscape	November 16, 2007 (EU)	No	No	Yes	No
Dear Girl: Stories Hibiki - Hibiki Tokkun Daisakusen!	HuneX	ASCII Media Works	December 17, 2009 (JP)	Yes	No	No	No
Death Note Kira's Game	Konami	Konami	February 15, 2007 (JP)	Yes	No	No	No
Death Note: L o Tsugu Mono	Konami	Konami	July 12, 2007 (JP)	Yes	No	No	No
Death, Jr. and the Science Fair of Doom	Backbone Entertainment	Konami	May 22, 2007 (NA)	No	Yes	Yes	No
Deca Sports DS	Hudson Soft	Hudson Soft	October 17, 2008 (EU)	Yes	Yes	Yes	No
Deep Labyrinth	Interactive Brains	505 Games, Atlus, Interactive Brains	March 23, 2006 (JP)	Yes	Yes	Yes	No
Deer Drive	Mastiff	Mastiff	October 5, 2010 (US)	No	Yes	No	No
Defendin' DePenguin	Crave Entertainment	Crave Entertainment	September 2, 2008 (NA)	No	Yes	No	No
Dekiru Otoko no Mote Life: Hiru no Mote Kouza Hen	Takara Tomy	Takara Tomy	February 14, 2008 (JP)	Yes	No	No	No
Dekiru Otoko no Mote Life: Yoru no Mote Jissen Hen	Takara Tomy	Takara Tomy	February 14, 2008 (JP)	Yes	No	No	No
Dekitayo Mama! Mitsugo no Kuma-San - Onna no Ko	Starfish SD	Starfish SD	April 15, 2010 (JP)	Yes	No	No	No
Dekitayo Mama! Mitsugo no Kuma-San - Otoko no Ko	Starfish SD	Starfish SD	April 15, 2010 (JP)	Yes	No	No	No
Deltora Quest	Namco Bandai Games	Namco Bandai Games	September 20, 2007 (JP)	Yes	No	No	No
Dementium II	Renegade Kid	SouthPeak Games, Intergrow	May 4, 2010 (NA)	Yes	Yes	Yes	No
Dementium: The Ward	Renegade Kid	Gamecock Media Group, Interchannel	June 26, 2008 (JP)	Yes	Yes	Yes	No
Dengeki Gakuen RPG: Cross of Venus	Pegasus Japan	ASCII Media Works	March 19, 2009 (JP)	Yes	No	No	No
Dengeki Gakuen RPG: Cross of Venus Special	Pegasus Japan	ASCII Media Works	February 10, 2011 (JP)	Yes	No	No	No
Denjirou Sensei no Fushigi na Jikkenshitsu	Jaleco Entertainment	Jaleco Entertainment	July 17, 2008 (JP)	Yes	No	No	No
Denksport Varia	Foreign Media	Foreign Media	2008 (PAL)	No	No	Yes	No
Densetsu no Starfy 4	Tose	Nintendo	April 13, 2006 (JP)	Yes	No	No	No
Densha de Go! Tokubetsu-hen: Fukkatsu! Shouwa no Yamanotesen	Square Enix, Taito	Square Enix	July 22, 2010 (JP)	Yes	No	No	No
Der Bauernhof	Visual Imagination Software	Astragon Software	November 12, 2009 (EU)	No	No	Yes	No
Der Dativ ist dem Genitiv sein Tod	United Soft Media	United Soft Media	October 13, 2009 (EU)	No	No	Yes	No
Der Fluch der Osterinsel	Independent Arts	SevenOne Intermedia	November 11, 2010 (EU)	No	No	Yes	No
Der Schatz der Delfine	Crenetic	Tivola Publishing GmbH	May 26, 2009 (EU)	No	No	Yes	No
Derby Stallion DS	Enterbrain	Enterbrain	June 26, 2008 (JP)	Yes	No	No	No
Des Chiffres et des Lettres	Mindscape	Mindscape	September 22, 2008 (EU)	No	No	Yes	No
Desktop Tower Defense	THQ	THQ	May 11, 2009 (NA)	No	Yes	No	No
Despicable Me: Minion Mayhem	WayForward	D3Publisher	July 6, 2010 (US)	No	Yes	Yes	Yes
Destiny Links	Bec	Bandai Namco Games	February 5, 2009 (JP)	Yes	No	No	No
Deviens Miss France	Gimagin Games	Micro Application	September 20, 2007 (EU)	No	No	Yes	No
Devilish: Ball Bounder	Starfish SD	505 Games, Starfish SD, UFO Interactive Games	April 28, 2005 (JP)	Yes	Yes	Yes	No
Di-Gata Defenders	The Game Factory	The Game Factory	May 13, 2008 (NA)	No	Yes	Yes	No
Diabolik: The Original Sin	Artematica	Black Bean Games	June 26, 2009 (EU)	No	No	Yes	No
Diamond Trust of London	Jason Rohrer	indiePub	August 7, 2012 (NA)	No	Yes	No	No
Diary Girl; Winx Club Secret Diary 2009^{EU}	Team 3 Games	Konami	March 18, 2008 (JP)	No	Yes	Yes	No
Diddl in the Cheesecakeland	Nurogames	Tivola Publishing GmbH	March 1, 2011 (EU)	No	No	Yes	No
Diddl Puzzle: Echter Puzzlespass fuer Unterwegs; Puzzle to Go: Diddl^{NA}	Tivola Publishing GmbH	Tivola Publishing GmbH	November 4, 2009 (EU)	No	Yes	Yes	No
Diddy Kong Racing DS	Rare	Nintendo	February 5, 2007 (NA)	Yes	Yes	Yes	Yes
Die drei ??? Das Geheimnis der Geisterinsel	4Head Studios	dtp Young Entertainment AG	October 19, 2007 (EU)	No	No	Yes	No
Die drei ??? Das Geheimnis der Toten	Crenetic	United Soft Media	September 24, 2010 (EU)	No	No	Yes	No
Die Wilden Huhner und die Jagd nach dem Rubinherz	Oetinger Interaktiv	Oetinger Interaktiv	May 8, 2008 (EU)	No	No	Yes	No
Diercke Das Geographie-Quiz	Visual Imagination Software	rondomedia	March 12, 2009 (EU)	No	No	Yes	No
Diercke Junior-Quiz Geographie (Note: Primarily a geography-learning application, though it includes a memory-matching game and a balloon-navigation game controlled using the microphone and directional pad.)	Visual Imagination Software	rondomedia	October 29, 2010 (EU)	No	No	Yes	No
Dig Dug: Digging Strike	Namco	Atari, Namco	September 8, 2005 (JP)	Yes	Yes	Yes	No
Digging for Dinosaurs	CokeM Interactive	CokeM Interactive	November 9, 2010 (US)	No	Yes	No	No
Digimon Story: Lost Evolution	Bec	Namco Bandai Games	July 1, 2010 (JP)	Yes	No	No	No
Digimon Story: Super Xros Wars Blue	Bec	Namco Bandai Games	March 3, 2011 (JP)	Yes	No	No	No
Digimon Story: Super Xros Wars Red	Bec	Namco Bandai Games	March 3, 2011 (JP)	Yes	No	No	No
Digimon World Championship	Namco Bandai Games	Namco Bandai Games	February 14, 2008 (JP)	Yes	Yes	No	No
Digimon World DS	Namco Bandai Games	Namco Bandai Games	June 15, 2006 (JP)	Yes	Yes	No	No
Digimon World: Dawn	Namco Bandai Games	Namco Bandai Games	March 29, 2007 (JP)	Yes	Yes	No	No
Digimon World: Dusk	Namco Bandai Games	Namco Bandai Games	March 29, 2007 (JP)	Yes	Yes	No	No
Diner Dash: Flo on the Go	PlayFirst	PlayFirst	September 18, 2009 (EU)	No	Yes	Yes	No
Diner Dash: Sizzle & Serve	GameLab, PlayFirst	Eidos Interactive	May 4, 2007 (EU)	No	Yes	Yes	No
Dino King Battle: Taiko Kara no Hyouryuusha	Skonec	Taito	August 24, 2006 (JP)	No	Yes	No	No
Dino Master	Creative Office	Eidos Interactive, Majesco, Taito	September 22, 2005 (JP)	Yes	Yes	Yes	No
Dino Pets 101 Dino Pets^{EU}	Destineer	Destineer	July 21, 2009 (JP)	No	Yes	Yes	No
Dinosaur King	Sega	Sega	November 11, 2007 (JP)	Yes	Yes	Yes	No
Dirt 2	Codemasters	Codemasters	September 8, 2009 (NA)	No	Yes	Yes	Yes
Discovery Kids:Dolphin Discovery	505 Games	505 Games	March 27, 2009 (NA)	No	Yes	No	No
Discovery Kids:Kitten Corner	505 Games	505 Games	March 27, 2009 (NA)	No	Yes	No	No
Discovery Kids:Parrot Pals	505 Games	505 Games	June 29, 2009 (NA)	No	Yes	No	No
Discovery Kids:Pony Paradise	505 Games	505 Games	March 27, 2009 (NA)	No	Yes	No	No
Discovery Kids:Puppy Playtime	505 Games	505 Games	March 27, 2009 (NA)	No	Yes	No	No
Discovery Kids:Snake Safari	505 Games	505 Games	November 15, 2010 (NA)	No	Yes	No	No
Discovery Kids:Spider Quest	505 Games	505 Games	November 24, 2009 (NA)	No	Yes	No	No
Disgaea DS	Nippon Ichi Software	Nippon Ichi Software, NIS America, Square Enix	June 26, 2008 (JP)	Yes	Yes	Yes	Yes
Disney Big Hero 6: Battle in the Bay	1st Playable Productions	GameMill Entertainment	October 28, 2014 (NA)	No	Yes	Yes	No
Disney Bolt	Avalanche Software	Disney Interactive Studios	November 18, 2008 (NA)	Yes	Yes	Yes	Yes
Disney Camp Rock: The Final Jam	Disney Interactive Studios	Disney Interactive Studios	August 31, 2010 (NA)	No	Yes	Yes	Yes
Disney Club Penguin: Elite Penguin Force - Herbert's Revenge	1st Playable Productions	Disney Interactive Studios	May 25, 2010 (NA)	No	Yes	Yes	Yes
Disney Fairies: Feji	Genius Sonority Inc.	Disney Interactive Studios	October 21, 2008 (NA)	Yes	Yes	Yes	Yes
Disney Fairies: Tinker Bell and the Great Fairy Rescue	Jupiter Corporation	Disney Interactive Studios	September 10, 2010 (EU)	Yes	Yes	Yes	Yes
Disney Fairies: Tinker Bell and the Lost Treasure	EA Bright Light Studio	Disney Interactive	October 27, 2009 (NA)	Yes	Yes	Yes	Yes
Disney Friends	Amaze Entertainment, Walt Disney Interactive	Disney Interactive Studios, Walt Disney Interactive	October 19, 2007 (EU)	Yes	Yes	Yes	Yes
Disney Frozen: Olaf's Quest	1st Playable Productions	GameMill Entertainment	November 19, 2013 (NA)	No	Yes	Yes	Yes
Disney Hannah Montana: Music Jam	Gorilla Systems	Disney Interactive Studios	October 16, 2007 (NA)	No	Yes	Yes	No
Disney High School Musical 2: Work This Out!	Artificial Mind and Movement	Disney Interactive Studios	April 15, 2008 (NA)	No	Yes	Yes	No
Disney High School Musical 3: Senior Year	Griptonite Games	Disney Interactive Studios	October 21, 2008 (NA)	No	Yes	Yes	No
Disney High School Musical: Makin' the Cut!	Artificial Mind and Movement	Buena Vista Games	August 14, 2007 (NA)	No	Yes	Yes	No
Disney Planes	Tose	Disney Interactive Studios	August 6, 2013 (NA)	No	Yes	Yes	Yes
Disney Princess: Enchanting Storybooks	Page 44 Studios	THQ	November 1, 2011 (NA)	No	Yes	Yes	Yes
Disney Princess: Magical Jewels	1st Playable Productions	Disney Interactive Studios	October 16, 2007 (NA)	Yes	Yes	Yes	Yes
Disney Stitch Jam	Disney Interactive Studios	Disney Interactive Studios	December 3, 2009 (JP)	Yes	Yes	No	No
Disney Tangled: The Video Game	Planet Moon Studios	Disney Interactive Studios	November 23, 2010 (NA)	No	Yes	Yes	Yes
Disney Violetta: Rhythm & Music	Little Orbit	Disney Interactive Studios	September 26, 2014 (EU)	No	No	Yes	No
Disney's A Christmas Carol	Sumo Digital	Disney Interactive Studios	November 3, 2009 (NA)	No	Yes	Yes	Yes
Disney's American Dragon: Jake Long, Attack of the Dark Dragon	WayForward Technologies	Buena Vista Games	October 12, 2006 (NA)	No	Yes	Yes	Yes
Disney's Chicken Little: Ace in Action	Disney Interactive Studios	Buena Vista Games, Disney Interactive Studios	November 9, 2006 (NA)	Yes	Yes	Yes	Yes
Disney's Herbie Rescue Rally	Buena Vista Games	Disney Interactive Studios	March 15, 2007 (NA)	No	Yes	Yes	Yes
Disney's Kim Possible: Global Gemini	Artificial Mind and Movement	Buena Vista Games, Disney Interactive Studios	February 9, 2007 (EU)	No	Yes	Yes	Yes
Disney's Kim Possible: Kimmunicator	Artificial Mind and Movement	Buena Vista Games, Disney Interactive Studios	November 9, 2005 (NA)	No	Yes	Yes	No
Disney's Meet the Robinsons	Buena Vista Games	Disney Interactive Studios	March 27, 2007 (NA)	Yes	Yes	Yes	Yes
Disney's That's So Raven: Psychic on the Scene	Handheld Games	Buena Vista Games	November 2, 2006 (NA)	No	Yes	No	No
Disney's The Little Mermaid: Ariel's Undersea Adventure	Gorilla Systems	Buena Vista Games, Disney Interactive Studios	October 2, 2006 (NA)	Yes	Yes	Yes	Yes
Disney/Pixar Wall-E	Helixe	THQ	June 24, 2008 (NA)	Yes	Yes	Yes	Yes
Disney/Pixar's Brave: The Video Game	Behaviour Interactive	Disney Interactive Studios	May 19, 2012 (NA)	No	Yes	Yes	No
Disney/Pixar's Cars	Helixe	THQ	June 6, 2006 (NA)	Yes	Yes	Yes	Yes
Disney/Pixar's Cars 2	Firebrand Games	Disney Interactive Studios	November 1, 2011 (NA)	No	Yes	Yes	Yes
Disney/Pixar's Cars Mater-National Championship	Tantalus Interactive	THQ	October 29, 2007 (NA)	No	Yes	Yes	Yes
Disney/Pixar's Cars Race-O-Rama	Tantalus Interactive	THQ	October 12, 2009 (NA)	No	Yes	Yes	Yes
Disney/Pixar's Finding Nemo: Escape to the Big Blue	Altron	Sega, THQ	February 11, 2006 (NA)	Yes	Yes	Yes	Yes
Disney/Pixar's Finding Nemo: Escape to the Big Blue Special Edition	Altron	Disney Interactive Studios	September 9, 2012 (NA)	No	Yes	Yes	No
Disney/Pixar's Ratatouille	Helixe	THQ	June 26, 2007 (NA)	Yes	Yes	Yes	No
Disney/Pixar's Ratatouille: Food Frenzy	Helixe	THQ	October 29, 2007 (NA)	No	Yes	Yes	No
Disney/Pixar's The Incredibles: Rise of the Underminer	Helixe	Sega, THQ	November 1, 2005 (NA)	Yes	Yes	Yes	No
Disney/Pixar's Toy Story 3	n-Space	Disney Interactive Studios	June 15, 2010 (NA)	Yes	Yes	Yes	Yes
Disney/Pixar's Up	Altron	THQ	May 26, 2009 (NA)	No	Yes	Yes	Yes
Diva Girls: Diva Dancers	Gevo Entertainment	505 Games	April 9, 2009 (EU)	No	No	Yes	Yes
Diva Girls: Divas on Ice	DEL	505 Games	June 16, 2009 (EU)	No	Yes	Yes	No
DJ Star	Game Life	Deep Silver	August 21, 2009 (EU)	No	Yes	Yes	No
DK Jungle Climber	Paon	Nintendo	August 9, 2007 (JP)	Yes	Yes	Yes	Yes
Do-Konjou Shougakussei: Bon Bita - Hadaka no Choujou Ketsusen!! Bita vs. Dokuro Dei!	Bandai Namco Games	Bandai Namco Games	November 4, 2010 (JP)	Yes	No	No	No
Doctor Who: Evacuation Earth	Asylum Entertainment	Asylum Entertainment	November 12, 2010 (EU)	No	No	Yes	Yes
Dodge Racing: Charger vs Challenger	EM Studios	Zoo Games	October 13, 2009 (NA)	No	Yes	Yes	No
Dogz	MTO	Ubisoft	November 22, 2006 (NA)	No	Yes	Yes	No
Dokapon Journey	Sting Entertainment	Atlus, Sting Entertainment	July 29, 2008 (JP)	Yes	Yes	No	No
Doki Doki Majo Shinpan 2 Duo	SNK Playmore	SNK Playmore	July 31, 2008 (JP)	Yes	No	No	No
Doki Doki Majo Shinpan!	SNK Playmore	SNK Playmore	July 5, 2007 (JP)	Yes	No	No	No
Doki Majo Plus	SNK Playmore	SNK Playmore	July 30, 2009 (JP)	Yes	No	No	No
The Doko Demo Kanji Quiz	Vingt-et-un Systems	D3Publisher	December 21, 2006 (JP)	Yes	No	No	No
Dolphin Island: Underwater Adventures	Magic Pockets	Ubisoft	October 30, 2009 (EU)	No	No	Yes	No
Dolphin Trainer	Sanuk Games	Bigben Interactive	March 13, 2009 (EU)	No	No	Yes	No
Don King Boxing	Venom Games	2K Games, 2K Sports	March 27, 2009 (EU)	No	Yes	Yes	Yes
Donkey Xote	Revistronic	Virgin Play	November 14, 2008 (EU)	No	No	Yes	No
Doodle Hex	Tragnarion Studios	Disney Interactive Studios, Tragnarion Studios, Pinnacle	July 11, 2008 (EU)	No	No	Yes	Yes
Doodle Jump Journey	CokeM Interactive	GameMill Entertainment	October 29, 2013 (NA)	No	Yes	No	No
Dora & Kai-Lan's Pet Shelter	Black Lantern Studios	2K Play	November 1, 2011 (NA)	No	Yes	Yes	Yes
Dora the Explorer: Dora Saves the Mermaids	Black Lantern Studios	2K Play	November 5, 2007 (NA)	No	Yes	Yes	Yes
Dora the Explorer: Dora Saves the Snow Princess	Black Lantern Studios	2K Play, Take-Two Interactive	October 3, 2008 (EU)	No	Yes	Yes	Yes
Dora's Big Birthday Adventure	Black Lantern Studios	2K Play	August 3, 2010 (NA)	No	Yes	Yes	Yes
DoraBase 2: Nettou Ultra Stadium	Namco Bandai Games	Namco Bandai Games	November 19, 2009 (JP)	Yes	No	No	No
Dorabase: Dramatic Stadium	Namco Bandai Games	Namco Bandai Games	December 20, 2007 (JP)	Yes	No	No	No
Doraemon: Nobita no Kyouryuu 2006 DS	Sega	Sega	March 2, 2006 (JP)	Yes	No	No	No
Doraemon: Nobita no Shin Makai Daibouken DS	Sega	Sega	March 8, 2007 (JP)	Yes	No	No	No
Doraemon: Nobita to Midori no Kyojinden DS	Sega	Sega	March 6, 2008 (JP)	Yes	No	No	No
Double Sequence: The Q-Virus Invasion	Next Wave Team	Destination Software, Zoo Digital Publishing	April 1, 2008 (NA)	No	Yes	Yes	No
Dr. Seuss: How The Grinch Stole Christmas!	CokeM Interactive	Delphine Software International, Zoo Digital Publishing	November 8, 2007 (NA)	No	Yes	Yes	No
Dr. Slump: Arale-Chan	Namco Bandai Games	Namco Bandai Games	October 30, 2008 (JP)	Yes	No	No	No
Drachenspass mit Hexe Lilli	Morgen Studios	Morgen Studios	October 10, 2008 (EU)	No	No	Yes	No
Draglade	Dimps Corporation	505 Games, Atlus, Banpresto	May 17, 2007 (JP)	Yes	Yes	Yes	No
Dragon Ball Kai: Ultimate Butoden	Game Republic	Namco Bandai Games	February 3, 2011 (JP)	Yes	No	No	No
Dragon Ball Z: Attack of the Saiyans	Monolith Soft	Atari, Namco Bandai Games	April 29, 2009 (JP)	Yes	Yes	Yes	Yes
Dragon Ball Z: Harukanaru Densetsu	Namco Bandai Games	Atari, Namco Bandai Games	March 21, 2007 (JP)	Yes	Yes	Yes	Yes
Dragon Ball Z: Supersonic Warriors 2	Cavia	Atari, Bandai	November 20, 2005 (NA)	Yes	Yes	Yes	Yes
Dragon Ball: Origins	Game Republic	Atari, Namco Bandai Games	September 18, 2008 (JP)	Yes	Yes	Yes	Yes
Dragon Ball: Origins 2	Game Republic	Namco Bandai Games	February 11, 2010 (JP)	Yes	Yes	Yes	No
Dragon Booster	Konami	Konami	December 28, 2005 (NA)	No	Yes	Yes	No
Dragon Dance	Always Neat	Success	February 26, 2009 (JP)	Yes	No	No	No
Dragon Hunters	Engine Software	Playlogic	April 11, 2008 (EU)	No	Yes	Yes	No
Dragon Master	Tivola	Tivola	2009 (EU)	No	No	Yes	No
Dragon Quest Heroes: Rocket Slime	Square Enix, Tose	Square Enix	December 1, 2005 (JP)	Yes	Yes	No	No
Dragon Quest IV: Chapters of the Chosen	ArtePiazza	Square Enix	November 22, 2007 (JP)	Yes	Yes	Yes	No
Dragon Quest IX: Sentinels of the Starry Skies	Level-5	Square Enix	July 11, 2009 (JP)	Yes	Yes	Yes	No
Dragon Quest Monsters: Joker	Tose	Square Enix	December 28, 2006 (JP)	Yes	Yes	Yes	No
Dragon Quest Monsters: Joker 2	Tose	Square Enix	April 28, 2010 (JP)	Yes	Yes	Yes	No
Dragon Quest Monsters: Joker 2 Professional	Tose	Square Enix	March 31, 2011 (JP)	Yes	No	No	No
Dragon Quest V: Hand of the Heavenly Bride	ArtePiazza	Square Enix	July 17, 2008 (JP)	Yes	Yes	Yes	No
Dragon Quest VI: Realms of Revelation	ArtePiazza	Square Enix	January 28, 2010 (JP)	Yes	Yes	Yes	No
Dragon Tamer Sound Spirit	Namco Bandai Games	Namco Bandai Games	November 1, 2007 (JP)	Yes	No	No	No
Dragon's Lair	United Coders, Wizardly Engineering	Conspiracy Entertainment	November 21, 2009 (NA)	No	Yes	Yes	No
Dragonology	Codemasters	Codemasters	November 6, 2009 (EU)	No	Yes	Yes	No
Drake & Josh: Talent Showdown	Artificial Mind and Movement	THQ	July 30, 2007 (NA)	No	Yes	No	No
Drama Queens	Sensory Sweep Studios	Majesco	May 12, 2009 (NA)	No	Yes	Yes	No
Dramatic Dungeon: Sakura Taisen: Kimi Arugatame	Sega	Sega	March 19, 2008 (JP)	Yes	No	No	No
Drawn to Life	5TH Cell	Agatsuma Entertainment, THQ	September 10, 2007 (NA)	Yes	Yes	Yes	No
Drawn to Life: SpongeBob SquarePants Edition	Altron	THQ	September 15, 2008 (NA)	No	Yes	Yes	No
Drawn to Life: The Next Chapter	5TH Cell	THQ	October 8, 2009 (AU)	No	Yes	Yes	Yes
Dream Chronicles	Kat Games	Zoo Games	March 2, 2009 (EU)	No	Yes	Yes	No
Dream Dancer	CyberPlanet Interactive	Zoo Games	September 29, 2009 (NA)	No	Yes	No	No
Dream Day Wedding: Destinations	Webfoot Technologies	THQ	March 9, 2009 (EU)	No	No	Yes	No
Dream Pinball 3D	TopWare Interactive	SouthPeak Games	April 24, 2008 (NA)	No	Yes	Yes	No
Dream Salon	CyberPlanet Interactive	Zoo Games	October 3, 2011 (NA)	No	Yes	No	No
Dreamer Series: Babysitter; Let's Play Mums^{EU}	Zig Zag	Dreamcatcher	May 12, 2009 (NA)	No	Yes	Yes	No
Dreamer Series: Horse Trainer	Zig Zag	Dreamcatcher	March 17, 2009 (NA)	No	Yes	No	No
Dreamer Series: Pop Star	Zig Zag	Dreamcatcher	March 10, 2009 (NA)	No	Yes	No	No
Dreamer Series: Puppy Trainer	Zig Zag	Dreamcatcher	March 17, 2009 (NA)	No	Yes	Yes	No
Dreamer Series: Shop Owner; Let's Play Shops^{EU}	Zig Zag	Dreamcatcher	October 3, 2011 (NA)	No	Yes	Yes	No
Dreamer Series: Teacher	Zig Zag	Dreamcatcher	June 9, 2009 (NA)	No	Yes	No	No
Dreamer Series: Top Model	Zig Zag	Dreamcatcher	September 28, 2009 (NA)	No	Yes	No	No
Dreamer Series: Zoo Keeper; Baby Animal Zoo^{EU}	Zig Zag	Dreamcatcher	January 4, 2010 (NA)	No	Yes	Yes	No
DreamWorks & Aardman Flushed Away	Art	D3 Publisher	October 24, 2006 (NA)	Yes	Yes	Yes	No
DreamWorks Kung Fu Panda	Vicarious Visions	Activision	June 3, 2008 (NA)	Yes	Yes	Yes	Yes
DreamWorks Kung Fu Panda 2	Griptonite Games	THQ	May 24, 2011 (NA)	Yes	Yes	Yes	Yes
DreamWorks Madagascar	Vicarious Visions	Activision, Bandai	May 23, 2005 (NA)	Yes	Yes	Yes	No
DreamWorks Madagascar 3: The Video Game	Torus Games	D3 Publisher	June 5, 2012 (NA)	No	Yes	Yes	No
DreamWorks Madagascar Kartz	Sidhe	Activision	October 23, 2009 (NA)	No	Yes	Yes	No
DreamWorks Madagascar: Escape 2 Africa	Amaze Entertainment	Activision	November 4, 2008 (NA)	No	Yes	Yes	No
DreamWorks Megamind: The Blue Defender	Tantalus Media	THQ	November 2, 2010 (NA)	No	Yes	Yes	Yes
DreamWorks Puss in Boots	ImaginEngine	THQ	October 25, 2011 (NA)	No	Yes	Yes	Yes
DreamWorks Shrek Forever After	Griptonite Games	Activision	May 18, 2010 (NA)	No	Yes	Yes	Yes
Dreamworks Shrek Smash n' Crash Racing	Torus Games	Activision	March 9, 2007 (NA)	No	Yes	Yes	No
DreamWorks Shrek SuperSlam	7 Studios, Shaba Games	Activision	October 25, 2005 (NA)	No	Yes	Yes	No
DreamWorks Shrek the Third	Vicarious Visions	Activision	May 2, 2007 (NA)	No	Yes	Yes	No
DreamWorks Shrek's Carnival Craze	Ivolgamus	Activision	October 28, 2008 (NA)	No	Yes	Yes	No
DreamWorks Shrek: Ogres & Dronkeys	WayForward Technologies	Activision	November 5, 2007 (NA)	No	Yes	Yes	No
DreamWorks Super Star Kartz	Virtuos	Activision	November 15, 2011 (NA)	No	Yes	Yes	No
DreamWorks The Croods: Prehistoric Party!	Torus Games	D3 Publisher	March 19, 2013 (NA)	No	Yes	Yes	Yes
Driver Dan's Story Train	Avanquest Software	Avanquest Software	October 26, 2012 (EU)	No	No	Yes	No
Driving Theory Training (Note: Primarily a driving-theory learning application, though it includes road-sign memory games and vehicle-parking challenges.); Driving Theory Training 2009/2010 Edition; Le Code de la Route^{FR} Code de la Route: Moto et BSR^{FR} Warning: Code de la Route^{FR} Rijexamen Training - Code de la Route 2008^{NL}	Anuman Interactive	Atari	August 29, 2008 (EU)	No	No	Yes	No
Driver License Trainer Italia 2009-2010 (Note: Primarily an application, though it includes several mini-games.); Driver License Trainer Espana: Tests de Autoescuela 2009-2010^{ESP} Fuehrerschein-Trainer^{DE}	PubCompany	PubCompany	2008 (PAL)	No	No	Yes	No
Drone Tactics	Success	Atlus, Success	August 2, 2007 (JP)	Yes	Yes	No	No
DropCast	Mikoishi	THQ	September 22, 2008 (NA)	No	Yes	Yes	No
DS Dengeki Bunko ADV: Baccano!	Media Works	Media Works	February 28, 2008 (JP)	Yes	No	No	No
DS Dengeki Bunko: Allison	Media Works	Media Works	December 7, 2006 (JP)	Yes	No	No	No
DS Dengeki Bunko: Inukami! feat. Animation	Media Works	Media Works	December 7, 2006 (JP)	Yes	No	No	No
DS Dengeki Bunko: Iria no Sora, UFO no Natsu	Media Works	Media Works	July 11, 2007 (JP)	Yes	No	No	No
DS Dengeki Bunko: Iria no Sora, UFO no Natsu II	Media Works	Media Works	October 25, 2007 (JP)	Yes	No	No	No
DS Motte Tabi ni Deyo: Kyoto (Note: Primarily a Kyoto travel-guide application, though it includes a collection of mini-games.)	JTB West	JTB West	February 28, 2008 (JP)	Yes	No	No	No
DS Nishimura Kyotaro Suspense 2 Shin Tantei Series	Tecmo	Tecmo	November 13, 2008 (JP)	Yes	No	No	No
DS Nishimura Kyotaro Suspense Shin Tantei Series: Kyoto Atami Zekkai no Kotou - Satsui no Wana	Tecmo	Tecmo	October 11, 2007 (JP)	Yes	No	No	No
DS Pico Series: Sanrio no Party Heikou! Oryouri - Oshiyare - Okaimono	Compile Heart	Compile Heart	August 7, 2008 (JP)	Yes	No	No	No
DS Pico Series: Sanrio Puro Land - Waku Waku Okaimono - Suteki na Oheya Otsukuri Masho	Compile Heart	Compile Heart	November 25, 2010 (JP)	Yes	No	No	No
DS Puzzler: Numpla Fan & Oekaki Logic	Cybird	TDK Core	December 7, 2006 (JP)	Yes	No	No	No
DS Puzzler: Numpla Fan & Oekaki Logic Wi-Fi Taiou	Cybird	TDK Core	December 20, 2007 (JP)	Yes	No	No	No
DS Toukemuri Suspense Series: Free Writer Touyako	Zenrin	Zenrin	April 24, 2008 (JP)	Yes	No	No	No
DS Yamamura Misa Suspense: Maiko Kogiku / Kisha Katherine / Sougiya Ishihara Akiko / Koto ni Mauhana Sanrin - Kyoto Satujin Jiken File	Tecmo	Tecmo	June 5, 2008 (JP)	Yes	No	No	No
Ducati Moto	4J Studios	Vir2L Studios	July 1, 2008 (NA)	No	Yes	Yes	No
Duel Love: Koisuru Otome wa Shōri no Megami	Namco Bandai Games	Namco Bandai Games	March 13, 2008 (JP)	Yes	No	No	No
Duke Nukem: Critical Mass	Apogee Software	Deep Silver	April 8, 2011 (EU)	No	Yes	Yes	Yes
Dun-Dam: Dungeons & Dam	Ride On	Acquire	April 29, 2009 (JP)	Yes	No	No	No
Dungeon Explorer: Warriors of Ancient Arts	Hudson Soft	Hudson Soft, Rising Star Games	November 15, 2007 (JP)	Yes	Yes	Yes	No
Dungeon of Windaria	Compile Heart	Compile Heart	May 15, 2008 (JP)	Yes	No	No	No
Dungeon Raiders	Cyanide	Hudson Soft, Rising Star Games	December 29, 2010 (NA)	No	Yes	No	No
Dynasty Warriors DS: Fighter's Battle	Koei	Koei	April 5, 2007 (JP)	Yes	Yes	Yes	No
e=m6 Defi Cerebral	Anuman Interactive	Atari SA	February 8, 2008 (EU)	No	No	Yes	No
EA Playground	EA Canada	Electronic Arts	October 23, 2007 (NA)	No	Yes	Yes	No
Easy Piano	Game Life	Valcon Games	December 4, 2009 (EU)	No	Yes	Yes	No
Eco Creatures: Save the Forest	Bergsala Lightweight	Interchannel, Majesco, Rising Star Games	August 23, 2007 (JP)	Yes	Yes	Yes	No
Ecolis: Aoi Umi to Ugoku Shima	Headlock	GungHo	May 28, 2009 (JP)	Yes	No	No	No
eCrew Development Program	McDonald's	McDonald's	2010 (JP)	Yes	No	No	No
Ed's Farm	FrontLine Studios	Zoo Digital Publishing	October 11, 2007 (EU)	No	No	Yes	No
Ed, Edd n Eddy: Scam of the Century	Art	D3 Publisher	October 23, 2007 (NA)	No	Yes	Yes	Yes
Edo Bunka Rekishi Kentei	Marvelous Entertainment	Marvelous Entertainment	March 13, 2008 (JP)	Yes	No	No	No
Edogawa Ranpo no Kaijin Nijuu Mensou DS	Takara Tomy	Takara Tomy	December 18, 2008 (JP)	Yes	No	No	No
Een Tegen 100	Foreign Media	Foreign Media	May 25, 2009 (EU)	No	No	Yes	No
Egg Monster Hero	Square Enix	Square Enix	March 24, 2005 (JP)	Yes	No	No	No
Eggheads	Avanquest Software	Avanquest Software	December 16, 2011 (EU)	No	No	Yes	No
Eigo de Tabisuru: Little Charo	Jupiter Corporation	Nintendo	January 20, 2011 (JP)	Yes	No	No	No
The Eigyoudou	Jorudan	Jorudan	March 27, 2008 (JP)	Yes	No	No	No
Eiken Kakomon Daishuuroku: Eiken DS 2 Deluxe (Note: Primarily an English-examination preparation application, though it includes a treasure-hunting learning game in which players rearrange letters to spell words.)	Rocket Company	Rocket Company	April 9, 2009 (JP)	Yes	No	No	No
El Internado Laguna Negra	Virgin Play	Virgin Play	May 14, 2009 (JP)	Yes	No	No	No
El Tigre: The Adventures of Manny Rivera	Barking Lizards Technologies	THQ	October 29, 2007 (NA)	No	Yes	Yes	No
Elebits: The Adventures of Kai and Zero	Konami	Konami	December 11, 2008 (JP)	Yes	Yes	Yes	No
Element Hunters	Climax Entertainment	Bandai Namco Games	October 22, 2009 (JP)	Yes	No	No	No
Elemental Monster	Hudson Soft	Hudson Soft	September 20, 2007 (JP)	Yes	No	No	No
Elements of Destruction	Black Lantern Studios	THQ	December 17, 2007 (NA)	No	Yes	Yes	No
Elf Bowling 1 & 2	Ignition Entertainment	Ignition Entertainment	December 1, 2005 (NA)	No	Yes	No	No
Elite Beat Agents	iNiS	Nintendo	November 6, 2006 (NA)	No	Yes	Yes	Yes
Elite Forces: Unit 77	Gammick Entertainment	Deep Silver	February 27, 2009 (NA)	No	Yes	No	No
Ellen Whitaker's Horse Life	Deep Silver	Deep Silver	November 28, 2008 (EU)	No	No	Yes	No
Elminage DS Remix: Yami no Miko to Kamigami no Yubiwa	Opera House	Starfish SD	November 13, 2008 (JP)	Yes	No	No	No
Elminage II DS Remix: Sousei no Megami to Unmei no Daichi	Opera House	Starfish SD	July 1, 2010 (JP)	Yes	No	No	No
Elvenland	Snapdragon Games	Intenium	April 1, 2008 (EU)	No	No	Yes	No
Emblem of Gundam	Namco Bandai Games	Namco Bandai Games	May 1, 2008 (JP)	Yes	No	No	No
Emergency 2012	Quadriga Games	Rondomedia	November 24, 2010 (EU)	No	No	Yes	No
Emergency Kids	Quadriga Games	Rondomedia	2010 (EU)	No	No	Yes	No
Emergency Room: Real Life Rescues	Legacy Interactive	Legacy Interactive	August 31, 2009 (NA)	No	Yes	No	No
Emergency! Desaster Rescue Squad; Emergency DS^{EU}	Sixteen Tons Entertainment	Destineer, Foreign Media	April 7, 2009 (NA)	No	Yes	Yes	No
Emily Archer and the Curse of Tutankhamun	Joindots	Mastertronic	March 18, 2011 (EU)	No	No	Yes	No
Emily the Strange: Strangerous	Exozet Games	PQube	June 10, 2011 (EU)	No	Yes	Yes	No
Emma at the Farm	Nobilis	Aspyr Media	November 28, 2008 (EU)	No	Yes	Yes	No
Emma in the Mountains	Nobilis	Aspyr Media	December 3, 2008 (NA)	No	Yes	No	No
Emma Student Nurse; La Vie D'Emma: Infirmiere de Choc^{FR}	Atari SA	Atari SA	2008 (PAL)	No	No	Yes	No
Enchanted	Altron	Disney Interactive Studios	November 13, 2007 (NA)	No	Yes	Yes	Yes
Ener-G Dance Squad; Imagine Modern Dancer^{EU}	Lexis Numerique	Ubisoft	October 21, 2008 (NA)	No	Yes	No	No
Ener-G Gym Rockets; Imagine Gymnast^{EU}	1st Playable Productions	Ubisoft	October 21, 2008 (NA)	No	Yes	No	No
Ener-G Horse Riders; Imagine: Champion Rider^{EU} Alexandra Ledermann: The Mystery of the Wild Horses^{EU}	Lexis Numerique	Ubisoft	October 21, 2008 (NA)	No	Yes	No	No
Englisch Buddy	Deep Silver	Deep Silver	2007 (PAL)	No	No	Yes	No
Englisch Entdecken mit Ben & Bella (Note: Primarily an English-learning application, though it includes a memory-matching mini-game.)	Rondomedia	Rondomedia	2013 (PAL)	No	No	Yes	No
Englisch macht Spass: Eine Reise nach London! (Note: Primarily an English-learning application, though it includes thirteen learning mini-games, including memory activities.)	Kritzelkratz 3000	DTP Young Entertainment	November 14, 2008 (EU)	No	No	Yes	No
English Training: Have Fun Improving Your Skills! (Note: Primarily an English-learning application, though it includes mini-games in its My Drill mode, including crossword puzzles.)	Plato	Nintendo	January 26, 2006 (JP)	Yes	No	Yes	No
Equestrian Training	Atari	Atari	November 7, 2008 (EU)	No	No	Yes	No
Equitation Galops 1 a 7	Anuman Interactive	Atari SA	September 19, 2008 (EU)	No	No	Yes	No
Eragon	Amaze Entertainment	Vivendi Games	November 14, 2006 (NA)	No	Yes	Yes	No
Escape the Museum	Gogii Games	GameMill Publishing	April 14, 2009 (NA)	No	Yes	Yes	No
Essential Sudoku DS	Essential Games	D3 Publisher	October 27, 2006 (NA)	Yes	No	Yes	No
Etrian Odyssey	Atlus, Lancarse	Atlus, Nintendo	January 18, 2007 (JP)	Yes	Yes	Yes	No
Etrian Odyssey II: Heroes of Lagaard	Atlus, Lancarse	Atlus	February 21, 2008 (JP)	Yes	Yes	No	No
Etrian Odyssey III: The Drowned City	Atlus	Atlus	April 1, 2010 (JP)	Yes	Yes	No	No
Everything's Rosie	Avanquest Software	Avanquest Software	January 25, 2013 (EU)	No	No	Yes	No
Exit	Taito	Square Enix, Taito, Ubisoft	January 24, 2008 (JP)	Yes	Yes	Yes	No
Eyeshield 21: MAX Devil Power	Nintendo	Nintendo	February 2, 2006 (JP)	Yes	No	No	No
F24: Stealth Fighter	Majesco	Eidos Interactive, Majesco	February 20, 2007 (NA)	No	Yes	Yes	No
Fab 5 Soccer	Destineer	Destineer	April 11, 2008 (NA)	No	Yes	No	No
FabStyle	Koei Tecmo Games	Koei Tecmo Games	November 24, 2011 (JP)	Yes	No	No	No
Fabulous Finds	Webfoot Technologies	THQ	September 21, 2009 (NA)	No	Yes	No	No
Fairyland: Melody Magic	Ubisoft Shanghai	Ubisoft	October 10, 2009 (NA)	No	Yes	Yes	No
Family Feud	Ubisoft	Ubisoft	September 29, 2009 (NA)	No	Yes	No	No
Family Fortunes	Mindscape	Mindscape	October 23, 2009 (EU)	No	No	Yes	No
Family Park Tycoon	Visual Imagination Software	Astragon	November 17, 2008 (EU)	No	No	Yes	No
Famous	Famous	Nobilis	June 18, 2010 (EU)	No	No	Yes	No
Fancy Nancy: Tea Party Time!	Webfoot Technologies	THQ	September 14, 2010 (NA)	No	Yes	No	No
Fantastic Four: Rise of the Silver Surfer	7 Studios	2K Games; Take-Two Interactive	June 15, 2007 (WW)	No	Yes	Yes	Yes
Fantasy Aquarium; Kokoro ga Uruou Birei Aquarium DS: Kujira - Iruka - Penguin^{JP}	Destineer	Mercury Games; Destineer	December 11, 2007 (EU)	Yes	Yes	Yes	No
Farm Frenzy 3	Easy Interactive	Easy Interactive	November 10, 2011 (EU)	No	No	Yes	No
Farm Frenzy: Animal Country	City Interactive	City Interactive	September 24, 2010 (EU)	No	Yes	Yes	No
Farm Life	Black Lantern Studios, Destineer	Ubisoft	July 17, 2007 (EU)	No	No	Yes	No
Farmscapes	Big Fish Games	Mastertronic	March 29, 2013 (EU)	No	No	Yes	No
Farmtopia	505 Games	505 Games	October 19, 2010 (NA)	No	Yes	No	No
Fashion Studio: Paris Collection my Paris - Fashion House^{EUR}	505 Games	Ubisoft	March 25, 2009 (NA)	No	Yes	Yes	No
Fashion Tycoon	Engine Software	MSL	2010 (EU)	No	No	Yes	No
Fashion Week Jr. Designer; Fashion Designer: High Fashion^{EU}	Creative Pattern	505 Games	March 13, 2009 (EU)	No	Yes	Yes	No
Fast Food Panic	Dorasu	SouthPeak Games	January 15, 2010 (NA)	No	Yes	Yes	No
Feel the Magic: XY/XX; Project Rub^{EU}	Sonic Team	Sega	November 21, 2004 (NA)	Yes	Yes	Yes	Yes
Ferrari Challenge: Trofeo Pirelli	Climax	System 3	July 4, 2008 (EU)	No	Yes	Yes	No
FIFA 06	Electronic Arts	Electronic Arts	September 30, 2005 (EU)	No	Yes	Yes	Yes
FIFA 07	EA Sports	EA Sports	September 29, 2006 (EU)	No	Yes	Yes	Yes
FIFA 08	EA Canada	EA Sports	September 28, 2007 (EU)	No	Yes	Yes	Yes
FIFA 09	EA Canada	EA Sports	October 3, 2008 (EU)	No	Yes	Yes	Yes
FIFA 10	EA Sports	Electronic Arts	October 1, 2009 (EU)	No	Yes	Yes	Yes
FIFA 11	EA Sports	Electronic Arts	October 8, 2010 (NA, EU)	No	Yes	Yes	Yes
FIFA Street 2	EA Canada	EA Sports Big	February 28, 2006 (NA)	No	Yes	Yes	Yes
FIFA Street 3	Exient Entertainment	EA Sports Big	February 18, 2008 (NA)	No	Yes	Yes	Yes
FIFA World Cup: Germany 2006	Exient Entertainment	Electronic Arts	April 24, 2006 (NA)	No	Yes	Yes	No
Fifi & the Flowertots	Uacari	Avanquest	July 17, 2009 (EU)	No	No	Yes	No
Fifi and the Flowertots: Fifi's Garden Party	Uacari	Avanquest	November 4, 2011 (EU)	No	No	Yes	No
Fighting Fantasy: The Warlock of Firetop Mountain	Big Blue Bubble	Aspyr	November 23, 2009 (NA)	No	Yes	No	No
Final Fantasy Crystal Chronicles: Echoes of Time	Square Enix	Square Enix	January 29, 2009 (JP)	Yes	Yes	Yes	Yes
Final Fantasy Crystal Chronicles: Ring of Fates	Square Enix	Square Enix	August 23, 2007 (JP)	Yes	Yes	Yes	Yes
Final Fantasy Fables: Chocobo Tales	h.a.n.d.	Square Enix	December 14, 2006 (JP)	Yes	Yes	Yes	Yes
Final Fantasy III (2006 video game)	Matrix Software	Square Enix	August 24, 2006 (JP)	Yes	Yes	Yes	Yes
Final Fantasy IV	Matrix Software; Square Enix	Square Enix	December 20, 2007 (JP)	Yes	Yes	Yes	Yes
Final Fantasy Tactics A2: Grimoire of the Rift	Square Enix	Square Enix	October 25, 2007 (JP)	Yes	Yes	Yes	Yes
Final Fantasy XII: Revenant Wings	Square Enix; Think & Feel	Square Enix	April 26, 2007 (JP)	Yes	Yes	Yes	Yes
Final Fantasy: The 4 Heroes of Light	Matrix Software	Square Enix	October 29, 2009 (JP)	Yes	Yes	Yes	Yes
Fire Emblem: Shadow Dragon	Intelligent Systems	Nintendo	August 7, 2008 (JP)	Yes	Yes	Yes	Yes
Fire Emblem: Shin Monshō no Nazo ~Hikari to Kage no Eiyū~	Intelligent Systems	Nintendo	June 15, 2010 (JP)	Yes	No	No	No
Fireman Sam	Uacari	Avanquest	August 27, 2010 (EU)	No	No	Yes	No
Fireman Sam: Action Stations	Uacari	Avanquest	November 15, 2013 (EU)	No	No	Yes	No
Fish Tycoon	Big Fish Games, Last Day of Work	Eidos Interactive, Majesco	October 16, 2007 (NA)	No	Yes	Yes	No
Fishdom	Playrix Entertainment	Atari SA	July 5, 2011 (EU)	No	Yes	Yes	No
Fix It: Home Improvement	Oxygen Interactive	SouthPeak Games	May 21, 2010 (EU)	No	No	Yes	No
Fizz	DK Games	Lexicon Entertainment	February 29, 2008 (EU)	No	No	Yes	No
Flåklypa Grand Prix (DS)	Caprino Studios	PAN Vision	April 23, 2010 (EU)	No	No	Yes	No
Flash Focus: Vision Training in Minutes a Day	Namco Bandai Games, Nintendo	Nintendo	May 31, 2007 (JP)	Yes	Yes	Yes	No
Flipper Critters	Zen Studios	Conspiracy Entertainment, Ignition Entertainment	March 23, 2007 (EU)	No	Yes	Yes	No
Florist Shop	Teyon	UFO Interactive Games, Rondomedia	September 21, 2010 (NA)	No	No	Yes	No
Flower, Sun, and Rain: Murder and Mystery in Paradise	Grasshopper Manufacture, h.a.n.d.	Marvelous Entertainment, Rising Star Games, Xseed Games	March 6, 2008 (JP)	Yes	Yes	Yes	No
Flunkene Pirater	Krea Media	Krea Media	2009 (EU)	No	No	Yes	No
Flunkerne Superskurke	Krea Media	Krea Media	May 20, 2009 (EU)	No	No	Yes	No
Flunkerne: Pa Manen	Krea Media	Krea Media	May 14, 2009 (EU)	No	No	Yes	No
Foot 2 Rue Nicolas Anelka	Koch Media	Deep Silver	2009 (EU)	No	No	Yes	No
Football Academy	EA Sports	EA Sports	March 29, 2009 (EU)	No	No	Yes	No
Football Director DS	Sports Director Limited	Pinnacle	October 31, 2008 (EU)	No	No	Yes	No
Ford Racing 3	Visual Impact	Empire Interactive, Zoo Digital Publishing	December 7, 2005 (NA)	No	Yes	Yes	No
Fort Boyard: Casse-tete & Enigmes	DREAM ON STUDIO	Mindscape	June 26, 2009 (EU)	No	No	Yes	No
Fort Boyard: The Game	DREAM ON STUDIO	Mindscape	June 22, 2007 (EU)	No	No	Yes	No
Fossil Fighters	Red Entertainment	Nintendo	April 17, 2008 (JP)	Yes	Yes	No	Yes
Fossil Fighters: Champions	Nintendo SPD, Red Entertainment, M2, Artdink	Nintendo	November 18, 2010 (JP)	Yes	Yes	No	No
Fossil League: Dino Tournament Challenge	MTO	D3 Publisher, MTO	August 25, 2005 (NA)	Yes	Yes	Yes	No
Foster's Home for Imaginary Friends: Imagination Invaders	Sensory Sweep Studios	Midway Games	November 12, 2007 (NA)	No	Yes	Yes	No
Foto Frenzy: Spot the Difference	Sanuk Games	Storm City Games	November 24, 2009 (NA)	No	Yes	No	No
Foto Showdown; Monster Finder^{JP}	Alpha Unit	Konami	November 19, 2009 (NA)	Yes	Yes	No	No
Franklin's Great Adventures	Neko Entertainment	The Game Factory	February 3, 2006 (EU)	No	Yes	Yes	No
Franzosisch Buddy	Deep Silver	Deep Silver	2007 (PAL)	No	No	Yes	No
Freddi Fish And Friends: ABC Under The Sea	1st Playable Productions	Atari	November 28, 2008 (EU)	No	Yes	Yes	No
Freddie Flintoff's Power Play Cricket; Shane Watson's PowerPlay Cricket 2011^{AUS}	Tradewest	Tradewest	August 13, 2010 (EU)	No	No	Yes	Yes
Freedom Wings	Taito	Natsume Inc., Taito, Zoo Digital Publishing	April 27, 2006 (JP)	Yes	Yes	Yes	No
Fresh Pretty Cure: Asobi Collection	Bandai	Namco Bandai Games	October 29, 2009 (JP)	Yes	No	No	No
Freshly-Picked Tingle's Rosy Rupeeland	Vanpool	Nintendo	September 2, 2006 (JP)	Yes	No	Yes	No
Fritz Chess fritz by chessbase^{EU}	Deep Silver	Deep Silver	July 10, 2009 (EU)	No	Yes	Yes	No
Frogger: Helmet Chaos	Konami	Konami	September 27, 2005 (NA)	No	Yes	Yes	No
The Frogman Show: DS Datte, Shouganaijanai.	Compile Heart	Compile Heart	October 25, 2007 (JP)	Yes	No	No	No
From the Abyss	Sonic Powered	Sonic Powered, Aksys Games	August 26, 2008 (NA)	Yes	Yes	No	No
Front Mission	Square Enix	Square Enix	March 22, 2007 (JP)	Yes	Yes	No	No
Front Mission 2089: Border of Madness	h.a.n.d.	Square Enix	May 29, 2008 (JP)	Yes	No	No	No
Fruits Mura no Doubutsu Tachi 2	TDK Core	TDK Core	April 6, 2006 (JP)	Yes	No	No	No
Fuehrerschein Coach 2008 (Note: Primarily an application, though it includes several mini-games.); Autoescuela Trainer^{ES}	BHV Software	BHV Software	2008 (EU)	No	No	Yes	No
Fukoumori: Moririi no Unhappy Project	Bandai Namco Games	Bandai Namco Games	November 29, 2007 (JP)	Yes	No	No	No
Fullmetal Alchemist: Dual Sympathy	Bandai	Bandai, Destineer, Empire Interactive	July 21, 2005 (JP)	Yes	Yes	Yes	No
Fullmetal Alchemist: Trading Card Game	Destineer	Destineer	October 15, 2007 (NA)	No	Yes	No	No
Fushigi no Dungeon: Fuurai no Shiren 4 - Kami no Hitomi to Akuma no Heso	ChunSoft	Spike	February 25, 2010 (JP)	Yes	No	No	No
Fushigi no Dungeon: Fuurai no Shiren 5 - Fortune Tower to Unmei no Dice	ChunSoft	Spike	December 9, 2010 (JP)	Yes	No	No	No
Fushigi no Dungeon: Fuurai no Shiren DS 2	ChunSoft	Spike	November 13, 2008 (JP)	Yes	No	No	No
Fushigi Yuugi DS	Idea Factory	Idea Factory	June 25, 2009 (JP)	Yes	No	No	No
Fushigi? Kagaku: Nazotoki Quiz Training - NazoTore (Note: Primarily a science and social-studies learning application, with quizzes presented in a role-playing-game format.)	Good-Feel	Benesse	September 25, 2008 (JP)	Yes	No	No	No
Futari wa Pretty Cure Splash Star: Panpaka game deji kojo!	Bandai	Namco Bandai Games	November 30, 2006 (JP)	Yes	No	No	No
Futari wa Pretty Cure: Max Heart – Danzen! DS de Precure - Chikara wo Awasete Dai Battle	Bandai	Namco Bandai Games	December 1, 2005 (JP)	Yes	No	No	No
Fuuun! Dairoujou	Idea Factory	Idea Factory	April 23, 2009 (JP)	Yes	No	No	No
Fuyu no Sonata DS	D3 Publisher	D3 Publisher	December 17, 2009 (JP)	Yes	No	No	No
G-Force	Keen Games	Disney Interactive Studios	July 21, 2009 (NA)	No	Yes	Yes	No
G.I. Joe: The Rise of Cobra	Backbone Entertainment	Electronic Arts	August 24, 2009 (NA)	No	Yes	Yes	No
Gachapin Challenge DS	Hudson Soft	Hudson Soft	July 17, 2008 (JP)	Yes	No	No	No
Gachapin Nikki DS	Hudson Soft	Hudson Soft	September 20, 2007 (JP)	Yes	No	No	No
Gaitame Baibai Trainer: Kabutore FX (Note: Primarily a foreign-exchange learning application, though it includes a board-game mode for up to four players as well as simulated currency trading.)	Kojima Productions	Konami	March 26, 2009 (JP)	Yes	No	No	No
Gakkou no Kaidan DS	Compile Heart	Compile Heart	July 17, 2008 (JP)	Yes	No	No	No
Gakkou no Kowai Uwasa: Hanako-San ga Kita!! Minna no Hanako-San	WorkJam	Arc System Works	August 7, 2008 (JP)	Yes	No	No	No
Gakuen Alice	Kids Station	Kids Station	April 19, 2007 (JP)	Yes	No	No	No
Gakuen Hetalia	Idea Factory	Idea Factory	March 8, 2012 (JP)	Yes	No	No	No
The Gal Mahjong	D3 Publisher	D3 Publisher	September 25, 2008 (JP)	Yes	No	No	No
Galactic Taz Ball	WayForward Technologies	Warner Bros. Interactive Entertainment	August 10, 2010 (NA)	No	Yes	Yes	No
Galactik Football	505 Games	505 Games	July 1, 2009 (EU)	No	No	Yes	No
Galaxy Racers	KUNST-STOFF	Ubisoft	June 25, 2010 (EU)	No	Yes	Yes	No
Galileo	D3 Publisher	D3 Publisher	October 16, 2008 (JP)	Yes	No	No	No
Galileo Mystery: The Crown of Mida	Independent Arts	SevenOne Intermedia	October 8, 2009 (EU)	No	No	Yes	No
Game & Watch Collection	Nintendo	Nintendo	July 28, 2006 (JP)	Yes	Yes	Yes	Yes
Game & Watch Collection 2	Nintendo	Nintendo	September 5, 2008 (JP)	Yes	Yes	No	No
Game Book DS: Aquarian Age Perpetual Period	Broccoli	Broccoli	February 25, 2010 (JP)	Yes	No	No	No
Game Book DS: Koukaku no Regios	Broccoli	Broccoli	January 28, 2010 (JP)	Yes	No	No	No
Game Center CX: Arino no Chousenjou 2	indieszero	Bandai Namco Games	February 26, 2009 (JP)	Yes	No	No	No
Game de Demashita! Powerpuff Girls Z	Namco Bandai Games	Namco Bandai Games	June 14, 2007 (JP)	Yes	No	No	No
Game Hits!	Foreign Media	Destineer	February 26, 2010 (EU)	No	Yes	Yes	No
Games Around the World	JV Games Inc.	Zoo Games	October 26, 2010 (NA)	No	Yes	No	No
Gamics Series Vol. 1: Yokoyama Mitsuteru - San Goku Shi - Vol. 1 - Touen no Chikai (Note: Primarily a digital-comic reader and reference application, though it also includes a battle simulation game.)	ASNetworks	ASNetworks	December 28, 2006 (JP)	Yes	No	No	No
Gamics Series Vol. 1: Yokoyama Mitsuteru - San Goku Shi - Vol. 2 - Ryofu no Matsuro (Note: Primarily a digital-comic reader and reference application, though it also includes a battle simulation game.)	ASNetworks	ASNetworks	February 22, 2007 (JP)	Yes	No	No	No
Gamics Series Vol. 1: Yokoyama Mitsuteru - San Goku Shi - Vol. 3 (Note: Primarily a digital-comic reader and reference application, though it also includes a battle simulation game.)	ASNetworks	ASNetworks	March 29, 2007 (JP)	Yes	No	No	No
Gamics Series Vol. 1: Yokoyama Mitsuteru - San Goku Shi - Vol. 4 (Note: Primarily a digital-comic reader and reference application, though it also includes a battle simulation game.)	ASNetworks	ASNetworks	April 26, 2007 (JP)	Yes	No	No	No
Gamics Series Vol. 1: Yokoyama Mitsuteru - San Goku Shi - Vol. 5 (Note: Primarily a digital-comic reader and reference application, though it also includes a battle simulation game and crossword puzzles.)	ASNetworks	ASNetworks	May 24, 2007 (JP)	Yes	No	No	No
Gamics Series Vol. 1: Yokoyama Mitsuteru - San Goku Shi - Vol. 6 (Note: Primarily a digital-comic reader and reference application, though it also includes a battle simulation game and crossword puzzles.)	ASNetworks	ASNetworks	June 28, 2007 (JP)	Yes	No	No	No
Ganbare Goemon: Tōkai Dōchū Ōedo Tengu ri Kaeshi no Maki	Konami	Konami	June 23, 2005 (JP)	Yes	No	No	No
Garaku Tale	MuuMuu	Koei	March 16, 2006 (JP)	Yes	No	No	No
Gardening Mama	Cooking Mama Limited	Majesco, Taito	March 19, 2009 (JP)	Yes	Yes	Yes	No
Gardenscapes	Easy Interactive	Easy Interactive	August 16, 2012 (EU)	No	No	Yes	No
Garfield Gets Real	Gravity-i	Destination Software, Zoo Digital Publishing	November 15, 2007 (NA)	No	No	Yes	No
Garfield's Fun Fest	Black Lantern Studios	Destination Software, Zoo Digital Publishing	August 29, 2008 (EU, NA)	No	Yes	Yes	No
Garfield's Nightmare	Shin'en	The Game Factory, Disney Interactive Studios	March 9, 2007 (EU)	No	Yes	Yes	No
Garfield: A Tail of Two Kitties	Two Tribes B.V.	The Game Factory	August 25, 2006 (EU)	No	Yes	Yes	No
Gedaechtnis Trainer	Franzis Verlag	Franzis Verlag	2008 (EU)	No	No	Yes	No
Gegege no Kitarou: Youkai Daigekisen	Bec	Bandai Namco Games	July 10, 2008 (JP)	Yes	No	No	No
The Gekai	D3 Publisher	D3 Publisher	August 28, 2008 (JP)	Yes	No	No	No
Gekikara Numpla 2500-Mon	Skonec	Success	December 20, 2007 (JP)	Yes	No	No	No
Gem Quest: 4 Elements; 4 Elements^{EU}	Joindots	Storm City Games	January 21, 2011 (EU)	No	Yes	Yes	No
Gendai Daisenryaku DS: Isshoku Sokuhatsu - Gunji Balance Houkai	SystemSoft Alpha	SystemSoft	February 25, 2010 (JP)	Yes	No	No	No
General Knowledge For Dummies; La Culture Generale Pour Les Nuls^{FR}	Anuman Interactive	Atari Corporation	June 9, 2008 (EU)	No	No	Yes	No
Generator Rex: Agent of Providence	Virtuos	Activision	November 1, 2011 (NA)	No	Yes	Yes	No
The Genshijin DS	D3 Publisher	D3 Publisher	March 27, 2008 (JP)	Yes	No	No	No
GeoMaster (Note: Primarily a geography-learning application, though it includes six unlockable sliding puzzles.)	Nurogames	Tivola	June 2, 2010 (EU)	No	No	Yes	No
Geometry Wars: Galaxies	Kuju Entertainment	Sierra Entertainment	November 27, 2007 (NA)	No	Yes	Yes	No
George of the Jungle and the Search for the Secret	Crave Entertainment	Crave Entertainment, Ignition Entertainment	March 28, 2008 (EU)	No	No	Yes	No
Germany's Next Topmodel 2009	SevenOne Intermedia	SevenOne Intermedia	April 15, 2009 (EU)	No	No	Yes	No
Germany's Next Topmodel 2010	SevenOne Intermedia	SevenOne Intermedia	2010 (EU)	No	No	Yes	No
Germany's Next Topmodel 2011	DTP Entertainment	7Games	2011 (EU)	No	No	Yes	No
Ghost Trick: Phantom Detective	Capcom	Capcom	June 19, 2010 (JP)	Yes	Yes	Yes	Yes
Ghostbusters: The Video Game	Zen Studios	Atari	June 16, 2009 (NA)	No	Yes	Yes	No
Giana Sisters DS	Spellbound Entertainment	DTP Entertainment	April 3, 2009 (EU)	No	Yes	Yes	Yes
Gina-Lisa Powershopping	Caipirinha Games	SevenOne Intermedia	July 23, 2009 (EU)	No	No	Yes	Yes
Ginga Tetsudou 999 DS	Culture Brain	Culture Brain	October 14, 2010 (JP)	No	No	Yes	No
Gintama DS: Yorozuya Daisoudou	Namco Bandai Games	Namco Bandai Games	September 23, 2006 (JP)	Yes	No	No	No
Gintama Gin-Oh Quest: Gin-san ga Tenshoku shitari Sekai wo Sukuttari	Banpresto	Banpresto	December 6, 2007 (JP)	Yes	No	No	No
Gintama Gintoki vs Hijikata	Banpresto	Banpresto	December 14, 2006 (JP)	Yes	No	No	No
Girls Life: Fashion Addict	Ubisoft	Ubisoft	November 5, 2009 (EU)	No	No	Yes	No
Girls Life: Jewellery Style	Ubisoft	Ubisoft	November 26, 2009 (EU)	No	No	Yes	Yes
Girls Only	Most Wanted Entertainment	Easy Interactive	October 19, 2010 (NA)	No	Yes	Yes	No
Glory Days 2	ODenis Studios	Ghostlight, Secret Stash Games	August 6, 2007 (NA)	No	Yes	Yes	No
Glory of Heracles	Paon	Nintendo	May 22, 2008 (JP)	Yes	Yes	No	No
Go West! A Lucky Luke Adventure	Neko Entertainment	Atari	November 20, 2007 (EU)	No	No	Yes	No
Go! Go! Cosmo Cops!	Noise	Namco Bandai Games	August 28, 2009 (EU)	No	No	Yes	No
Go, Diego, Go!: Great Dinosaur Rescue	Black Lantern Studios	Take-Two Interactive	October 27, 2008 (NA)	No	Yes	Yes	No
Go, Diego, Go!: Safari Rescue	Black Lantern Studios	2K Play	November 5, 2007 (NA)	No	Yes	Yes	No
Godzilla Unleashed: Double Smash	Santa Cruz Games	Atari	November 20, 2007 (NA)	No	Yes	Yes	No
GoGo's Crazy Bones	Black Lantern Studios	GameMill Publishing	March 28, 2012 (NA)	No	Yes	Yes	No
Gokujou!! Mecha Mote Iinchou: Girls Motekawa Box	Konami	Konami	July 30, 2008 (JP)	Yes	No	No	No
Gokujou!! Mecha Mote Iinchou: Mecha Mote Days, Hajime Masuwa!	Konami	Konami	December 4, 2008 (JP)	Yes	No	No	No
Gokujou!! Mecha Mote Iinchou: MM My Best Friend!	Konami	Konami	November 25, 2010 (JP)	Yes	No	No	No
Gokujou!! Mecha Mote Iinchou: MM Town de Miracle Change	Konami	Konami	December 10, 2010 (JP)	Yes	No	No	No
Golden Balls	Mindscape	Mindscape	December 5, 2008 (EU)	No	No	Yes	No
The Golden Compass	Artificial Mind and Movement	Sega	November 30, 2007 (EU)	Yes	Yes	Yes	No
Golden Nugget Casino DS	SkyRiver Studios	Majesco	December 15, 2005 (NA)	No	Yes	No	No
Golden Sun: Dark Dawn	Camelot Software Planning	Nintendo	October 28, 2010 (JP)	Yes	Yes	Yes	Yes
GoldenEye 007	n-Space	Activision	November 2, 2010 (NA)	No	Yes	Yes	Yes
GoldenEye: Rogue Agent	EA Tiburon, n-Space	EA Games	June 13, 2005 (NA)	Yes	Yes	Yes	No
Golgo 13: File G-13 o Oe	Marvelous Interactive	Marvelous Interactive	June 18, 2009 (JP)	Yes	No	No	No
Goosebumps HorrorLand	Scholastic Corporation	Scholastic Corporation	October 14, 2008 (NA)	No	Yes	Yes	No
GoPets: Vacation Island	1st Playable Productions	Konami	March 18, 2008 (NA)	No	Yes	Yes	No
Gormiti: The Lords of Nature!	Climax Studios	Konami	August 27, 2010 (EU)	No	Yes	Yes	No
Gotouchi Kentei DS	Studio Zan	Spike	November 22, 2006 (JP)	Yes	No	No	No
Gourmet Chef	Ubisoft	Ubisoft	June 24, 2008 (NA)	No	Yes	No	No
Grand Galop	Zig Zag	Deep Silver	June 5, 2010 (EU)	No	No	Yes	No
Grand Theft Auto: Chinatown Wars	Rockstar Leeds	Rockstar Games, CyberFront	March 17, 2009 (NA)	Yes	Yes	Yes	Yes
Grand Trucker Aniki: Shigoto to Kenka to Koimoyou	Rize Dragon	Genterprise	October 22, 2009 (JP)	Yes	No	No	No
Grease: The Official Video Game	Big Head Games Ltd.	505 Games	August 24, 2010 (NA)	No	Yes	Yes	Yes
Green Lantern: Rise of the Manhunters	Griptonite Games	Warner Bros. Interactive Entertainment	June 7, 2011 (NA)	No	Yes	Yes	Yes
Greg Hastings Tournament Paintball MAX'D	The Whole Experience	Activision	January 31, 2006 (NA)	No	Yes	No	No
Gremlins Gizmo	Pipeworks Software, Inc.	NECA	November 18, 2011 (NA)	No	Yes	No	No
Grey's Anatomy: The Video Game	Longtail Studios	Ubisoft	March 4, 2009 (NA)	No	Yes	Yes	Yes
GRID; Race Driver: Grid^{EU}	Firebrand Games	Codemasters	May 8, 2008 (NA)	No	Yes	Yes	No
Groovy Chick: My Fashion World	Mindscape	Mindscape	October 2, 2009 (EU)	No	No	Yes	No
The Guild DS	Independent Arts	RTL	April 2, 2009 (EU)	No	No	Yes	No
Guilty Gear Dust Strikers	Arc System Works	ASNetworks, Majesco, THQ	April 25, 2006 (NA)	Yes	Yes	Yes	No
Guinness World Records: The Video Game	Warner Bros. Interactive Entertainment	Warner Bros. Interactive Entertainment	October 24, 2008 (EU)	No	Yes	Yes	No
Guitar Hero: On Tour	Vicarious Visions	Activision	June 22, 2008 (NA)	No	Yes	Yes	No
Guitar Hero: On Tour Decades	Vicarious Visions	Activision	November 14, 2008 (EU)	No	Yes	Yes	No
Guitar Hero: On Tour Modern Hits	Vicarious Visions	Activision	June 9, 2009 (NA)	No	Yes	Yes	No
Guitar Rock Tour	Ubisoft	Ubisoft	November 4, 2008 (NA)	No	Yes	Yes	Yes
Gummy Bears Minigolf	Beyond Reality	Storm City Games	October 15, 2010 (NA)	No	Yes	No	No
Gunpey DS	Art	Atari, Namco Bandai Games	October 19, 2006 (JP)	Yes	Yes	Yes	No
Guru Guru; GuruGuru Nagetto^{JP}	BeeWorks	505 Game Street, Success	April 28, 2005 (JP)	Yes	No	Yes	No
Gyakuten Kenji 2	Capcom	Capcom	February 3, 2011 (JP)	Yes	No	No	No
Gyouretsu no Dekiru Houritsu Soudansho	Bandai Namco Games	Bandai Namco Games	February 25, 2010 (JP)	Yes	No	No	No
Habu Yoshiharu Shōgi de Kitaeru: Ketsudanryoku DS	Ides	Ides	March 12, 2009 (JP)	Yes	No	No	No
Hachi-One Diver DS	SilverStar	Electronic Arts	March 26, 2009 (JP)	Yes	No	No	No
The Haioku Byoutou	D3 Publisher	D3 Publisher	July 10, 2008 (JP)	Yes	No	No	No
The Haishasan	D3 Publisher	D3 Publisher	March 13, 2008 (JP)	Yes	No	No	No
Hajime no Ippo The Fighting! DS	Entertainment Software Publishing	Entertainment Software Publishing	December 4, 2008 (JP)	Yes	No	No	No
Hakuōki DS	Idea Factory	Idea Factory	December 1, 2009 (JP)	Yes	No	No	No
Hakuōki Reimeiroku DS	Idea Factory	Idea Factory	April 26, 2012 (JP)	Yes	No	No	No
Hakuōki Yuugiroku DS	Idea Factory	Idea Factory	April 28, 2011 (JP)	Yes	No	No	No
Hakuōki Zuisōroku DS	Idea Factory	Idea Factory	February 17, 2011 (JP)	Yes	No	No	No
Hamsterz Life	MTO, Digital Kids	Digital Kids, Ubisoft	November 28, 2006 (NA)	Yes	Yes	Yes	No
Hana Yori Dango: Koi Seyo Otome	Konami	Konami	July 10, 2008 (JP)	Yes	No	No	No
Hands On! Tangrams	Island Officials	Storm City Games	October 6, 2009 (NA)	No	Yes	No	No
Haneru no Tobira DS: Tanshuku Tetsudou no Yoru	Bandai Namco Games	Bandai Namco Games	December 6, 2007 (JP)	Yes	No	No	No
Hanguk Eomungyoyuk Yeonguhoe - Hangeom DS	Daewon Media	IronNos	June 6, 2009 (KR)	Yes	No	No	No
Hannah Montana	DC Studios	Buena Vista Games, Disney Interactive Studios	October 9, 2006 (EU, NA)	No	Yes	Yes	No
Hannah Montana: The Movie	n-Space	Disney Interactive Studios	April 7, 2009 (NA)	No	Yes	Yes	No
Hanshin Tigers DS	Spike	Spike	August 28, 2008 (JP)	Yes	No	No	No
Happy Bakery; Panpaka Panya-San^{JP}	Rising Star Games	Rising Star Games	June 26, 2008 (JP)	Yes	No	Yes	No
Happy Cooking; Casual Series 2980: Happy Cooking - Touch Pen de Tanoshiku o Ryouri^{JP} My Happy Kitchen^{EU}	MTO	MTO, Ubisoft	December 2, 2008 (NA)	Yes	Yes	Yes	No
Happy Feet	Artificial Mind and Movement	Midway Games, Warner Bros. Interactive Entertainment	November 14, 2006 (NA)	No	Yes	Yes	No
Happy Feet Two	WayForward Technologies	Warner Bros. Interactive Entertainment	November 8, 2011 (NA)	No	Yes	Yes	Yes
Happy Happy Clover	TDK Core	TDK Core	February 14, 2008 (JP)	Yes	No	No	No
Happy Hippos On Tour	10tacle Studios	10tacle Studios	November 12, 2007 (EU)	No	No	Yes	No
Happy My Sweets; Princess Bakery^{KR}	Global A	Global A	December 25, 2008 (JP)	Yes	No	No	No
The Hardy Boys: Treasure on the Track	XPEC Entertainment	DreamCatcher Games	September 1, 2009 (NA)	No	Yes	Yes	No
Harlem Globetrotters: World Tour	Destination Software	Destination Software, Zoo Digital Publishing	November 24, 2006 (PAL)	No	Yes	Yes	No
Harobots Action!	Sunrise Interactive	Sunrise Interactive	December 29, 2005 (JP)	Yes	No	No	No
Harry Potter and the Deathly Hallows: Part I	EA Bright Light Studio	EA Games	November 16, 2010 (NA)	No	Yes	Yes	Yes
Harry Potter and the Deathly Hallows: Part II	EA Bright Light Studio	EA Games	July 12, 2011 (NA)	No	Yes	Yes	Yes
Harry Potter and the Goblet of Fire	Electronic Arts	Electronic Arts	November 8, 2005 (NA)	Yes	Yes	Yes	No
Harry Potter and the Half-Blood Prince	EA Bright Light Studio	EA Games	June 30, 2009 (NA)	Yes	Yes	Yes	No
Harry Potter and the Order of the Phoenix	EA Games	EA Games	June 25, 2007 (NA)	Yes	Yes	Yes	No
Harukanaru Toki no Naka de: Maihitoyo	Koei	Koei	November 30, 2006 (JP)	Yes	No	No	No
Harukanaru Toki no Naka de: Yumenoukihashi	Koei	Koei	August 21, 2008 (JP)	Yes	No	No	No
Harvest Moon DS	Marvelous Interactive	Marvelous Interactive, Natsume Inc., Rising Star Games	March 17, 2005 (JP)	Yes	Yes	Yes	No
Harvest Moon DS Cute	Marvelous Interactive	Marvelous Interactive, Natsume Inc.	December 8, 2005 (JP)	Yes	Yes	No	No
Harvest Moon DS: Grand Bazaar	Marvelous Interactive	Marvelous Interactive, Natsume Inc., Rising Star Games	December 18, 2008 (JP)	Yes	Yes	Yes	No
Harvest Moon DS: Island of Happiness	Marvelous Interactive	Marvelous Interactive, Natsume Inc., Rising Star Games	February 1, 2007 (JP)	Yes	Yes	Yes	Yes
Harvest Moon DS: Sunshine Islands	Marvelous Interactive	Marvelous Interactive, Natsume Inc., Rising Star Games, Nintendo Australia	February 21, 2008 (JP)	Yes	Yes	Yes	Yes
Harvest Moon DS: The Tale of Two Towns	Marvelous Interactive	Marvelous Interactive, Natsume Inc., Rising Star Games	July 8, 2010 (JP)	Yes	Yes	Yes	Yes
Harvest Moon: Frantic Farming	Platinum-Egg	Natsume Inc., Rising Star Games	August 7, 2009 (NA)	No	Yes	Yes	Yes
Hasbro Family Game Night	Electronic Arts	Electronic Arts	October 26, 2009 (NA)	No	Yes	Yes	No
Have Fun With Crosswords	White Park Bay	White Park Bay	May 12, 2009 (EU)	No	No	Yes	No
Hayarigami 2 DS: Toshidensetsu Kaii Jiken	Nippon Ichi Software	Nippon Ichi Software	July 9, 2009 (JP)	Yes	No	No	No
Hayarigami DS: Toshidensetsu Kaii Jiken	Nippon Ichi Software	Nippon Ichi Software	June 11, 2009 (JP)	Yes	No	No	No
Hayate no Gotoku!: Boku ga Romeo de Romeo ga Boku de	HuneX	Konami	August 23, 2007 (JP)	Yes	No	No	No
Hayate no Gotoku!: Ojō-sama Produce Daisakusen Bokuiro ni Somare! Gakkou-Hen	HuneX	Konami	March 14, 2008 (JP)	Yes	No	No	No
Hayate no Gotoku!: Ojō-sama Produce Daisakusen Bokuiro ni Somare! Oyashiki-Hen	HuneX	Konami	March 14, 2008 (JP)	Yes	No	No	No
HeartCatch PreCure! Oshare Collection	Bandai	Namco Bandai Games	August 5, 2010 (JP)	Yes	No	No	No
Heathcliff! Frantic Foto	Storm City Games	Storm City Games	October 15, 2010 (EU)	No	No	Yes	No
Heavy Armor Brigade	Milestone	Milestone, UFO Interactive Games	November 29, 2007 (JP)	Yes	Yes	No	No
Hell's Kitchen	Ludia	Ubisoft	September 9, 2008 (NA)	No	Yes	Yes	No
Hello Baby!	Sonic Powered	505 Games	2009 (EU)	No	No	Yes	No
Hello Kitty no Gotouchi Collection: Koi no DokiDoki Trouble	Rocket Company	Rocket Company	June 21, 2007 (JP)	Yes	No	No	No
Hello Kitty no Oshare Party Sanrio Character Zukan DS	3 O'Clock	3 O'Clock	July 26, 2007 (JP)	Yes	No	No	No
Hello Kitty no PacPac & Logic	Dorart	Dorart	July 30, 2009 (JP)	Yes	No	No	No
Hello Kitty no Panda Sport Stadium	Dorasu	Dorasu	July 17, 2008 (JP)	Yes	No	No	No
Hello Kitty Party	Barnstorm Games	Majesco	September 18, 2009 (NA)	No	Yes	Yes	No
Hello Kitty: Big City Dreams	Empire Interactive	Atari, Empire Interactive	October 14, 2008 (NA)	No	Yes	Yes	No
Hello Kitty: Birthday Adventures	OneNine Studios	Zoo Games	February 23, 2010 (NA)	No	Yes	Yes	No
Hello Pocoyo!	Zinkia	Virgin Play	November 27, 2008 (EU)	No	No	Yes	No
Henry Hatsworth in the Puzzling Adventure	EA Tiburon	Electronic Arts	March 17, 2009 (NA)	No	Yes	Yes	No
Heracles: Battle With The Gods	Midas Interactive Entertainment	Conspiracy Entertainment, Midas Interactive Entertainment	November 2, 2007 (PAL)	No	No	Yes	No
Hero's Saga Laevatein Tactics	GungHo	GungHo, Aksys Games	December 4, 2008 (JP)	Yes	Yes	No	No
Heroes of Hellas 2: Olympia	Easy Interactive	Easy Interactive	January 13, 2012 (EU)	No	No	Yes	No
Heroes of Mana	Brownie Brown	Square Enix	March 8, 2007 (JP)	Yes	Yes	Yes	No
Het Huis Anubis: De Donkere Strijd	Engine Software	Studio 100 NV	2009 (EU)	No	No	Yes	No
Het Huis Anubis: Het Geheim Van Osiris	Engine Software	ThePharmacy	September 13, 2010 (EU)	No	No	Yes	No
Hexe Lilli Entdeckt Europa	Morgen Studios	Morgen Studios	2009 (EU)	No	No	Yes	No
Hi Hamtaro! Little Hamsters Big Adventure	AlphaDream	505 Games, Marvelous Interactive, Natsume Inc.	March 15, 2007 (JP)	Yes	Yes	Yes	No
Hi Hi Puffy AmiYumi: The Genie and the Amp	Sensory Sweep Studios	D3 Publisher	June 27, 2006 (NA)	No	Yes	Yes	No
Hidamari Sketch: Doko Demo Sugoroku x 365	Idea Factory	Idea Factory	February 12, 2009 (JP)	Yes	No	No	No
Hidden Expedition: Titanic	Big Fish Games	MSL	July 11, 2012 (EU)	No	No	Yes	No
Hidden Mysteries: Buckingham Palace	Gunnar Games	GameMill Publishing	March 16, 2010 (NA)	No	Yes	Yes	No
Hidden Mysteries: Salem Secrets - Witch Trials of 1692	Gunnar Games	GameMill Publishing	November 10, 2010 (NA)	No	Yes	Yes	No
Hidden Mysteries: Titanic: Secrets of the Fateful Voyage	Gunnar Games	Activision Value	November 3, 2009 (NA)	No	Yes	Yes	No
Hidden Mysteries: Vampire Secrets	Gunnar Games	GameMill Publishing	August 20, 2010 (NA)	No	Yes	Yes	No
Hidden Object Show	Intenium	Intenium	October 7, 2007 (EU)	No	No	Yes	No
Hidden Photo	PQube	PQube	March 18, 2011 (EU)	No	No	Yes	No
Higurashi no Naku Koro ni Kizuna: Daiichikan Tatari	Alchemist	Alchemist	June 26, 2008 (JP)	Yes	No	No	No
Higurashi no Naku Koro ni Kizuna: Dainikan Sō	Alchemist	Alchemist	November 27, 2008 (JP)	Yes	No	No	No
Higurashi no Naku Koro ni Kizuna: Daisankan Rasen	Alchemist	Alchemist	May 28, 2009 (JP)	Yes	No	No	No
Higurashi no Naku Koro ni Kizuna: Daiyonkan Kizuna	Alchemist	Alchemist	February 25, 2010 (JP)	Yes	No	No	No
Hiiro no Kakera DS	Idea Factory	Idea Factory	May 22, 2008 (JP)	Yes	No	No	No
The Hikyou Tankentai: Choutoko Special	Japan Art Media	D3Publisher	February 19, 2009 (JP)	Yes	No	No	No
Hirameki Action: Chibikko Wagan no Daiki na Bouken	Namco Bandai Games	Namco Bandai Games	January 29, 2009 (JP)	Yes	No	No	No
Hiromichi Oniisan no Oyako Taisou Navi	Dorart	Dorart	July 31, 2008 (JP)	Yes	No	No	No
Hissatsu Kung Fu: Kanji Dragon	Beyond Interactive	Success	June 7, 2007 (JP)	Yes	No	No	No
Hisshou Pachinko*Pachi-Slot Kouryaku Series DS Vol. 1: Shinseiki Evangelion - Magokoro o, Kimi ni	D3Publisher	D3Publisher	February 21, 2008 (JP)	Yes	No	No	No
Hisshou Pachinko*Pachi-Slot Kouryaku Series DS Vol. 2: CR Shinseiki Evangelion - Shito, Futatabi	D3Publisher	D3Publisher	June 12, 2008 (JP)	Yes	No	No	No
Hisshou Pachinko*Pachi-Slot Kouryaku Series DS Vol. 3: Shinseiki Evangelion - Yakusoku no Toki	D3Publisher	D3Publisher	December 4, 2008 (JP)	Yes	No	No	No
Hisshou Pachinko*Pachi-Slot Kouryaku Series DS Vol. 4: Shinseiki Evangelion - Saigo no Mono	D3Publisher	D3Publisher	June 30, 2009 (JP)	Yes	No	No	No
Hisshou Pachinko*Pachi-Slot Kouryaku Series DS Vol. 5: Shinseiki Evangelion - Tamashii no Kiseki	D3Publisher	D3Publisher	June 3, 2010 (JP)	Yes	No	No	No
History: Great Empires – Rome	Slitherine	Valcon Games	March 27, 2009 (NA)	No	Yes	Yes	Yes
The Hohei: Butai de Shutsugeki! Senjou no Inutachi	Tamsoft	D3Publisher	August 30, 2007 (JP)	Yes	No	No	No
Hokuto no Ken: Hokuto Shinken Denshousha no Michi	Spike	Spike	February 14, 2008 (JP)	Yes	No	No	No
Holly Hobbie & Friends	FrontLine Studios	Eidos Interactive, Majesco	October 8, 2007 (NA)	No	Yes	Yes	No
Hollywood Files: Deadly Intrigues	Foreign Media	Foreign Media	July 1, 2011 (NA)	No	No	Yes	No
Homie Rollerz	Webfoot Technologies	Destineer	March 5, 2008 (NA)	No	Yes	No	No
Honda ATV Fever	Beyond Reality	CokeM Interactive	October 7, 2010 (NA)	No	Yes	No	No
Honeycomb Beat	Hudson Soft	Hudson Soft, Konami	August 10, 2006 (JP)	Yes	Yes	Yes	No
Hop: The Movie Game	Engine Software	505 Games	March 18, 2011 (EU)	No	Yes	Yes	No
Hoppie	Jack of All Games	Maximum Family Games	September 7, 2011 (NA)	No	Yes	No	No
Horrible Histories: Ruthless Romans	Virtual Identity	Slitherline Software	August 7, 2009 (EU)	No	No	Yes	No
Horrid Henry	Asylum Entertainment	SouthPeak Games	March 26, 2010 (EU)	No	No	Yes	No
Horrid Henry's Horrid Adventure	Asylum Entertainment	Asylum Entertainment	November 5, 2010 (EU)	No	No	Yes	No
Horse & Foal: My Riding Stables	Independent Arts	DTP Entertainment	April 24, 2008 (AUS)	No	No	Yes	Yes
Horse Life	Neko Entertainment	AU: 505 Games; WW: D3 Publisher	October 12, 2007 (EU)	No	Yes	Yes	No
Horse Life 3	Game Life	Deep Silver	September 2, 2010 (EU)	No	No	Yes	No
Horse Life Adventures	Neko Entertainment	Valcon Games	September 18, 2010 (NA)	No	Yes	No	No
Horseland	Sarbakan Inc.	Mindscape	September 30, 2008 (EU)	No	No	Yes	Yes
Horsez	MTO	JP: MTO; WW: Ubisoft	October 26, 2006 (AU)	Yes	Yes	Yes	Yes
Hoshigami Remix	Arc System Works	JP: ASNetworks; NA: Aksys Games; EU: 505 Games	May 24, 2007 (JP)	Yes	Yes	Yes	No
Hoshizora no Comic Garden	HuneX	D3 Publisher	September 11, 2008 (JP)	Yes	No	No	No
Hospital Giant	SouthPeak Games	SouthPeak Games	August 27, 2007 (EU)	No	No	Yes	No
The Host Shiyouze! DX Knight King	Avantec	D3Publisher	March 12, 2009 (JP)	Yes	No	No	No
Hot Wheels: Battle Force 5	Virtuos	Activision	November 12, 2009 (NA)	No	Yes	Yes	Yes
Hot Wheels: Beat That!	Human Soft	Activision	November 6, 2007 (NA)	No	Yes	Yes	No
Hot Wheels: Track Attack	Firebrand Games	THQ	November 23, 2010 (NA)	No	Yes	Yes	Yes
Hotel Deluxe	exozet	dtp Young Entertainment AG	May 12, 2009 (EU)	No	No	Yes	No
Hotel Dusk: Room 215	Cing	Nintendo	January 22, 2007 (NA)	Yes	Yes	Yes	No
Hotel for Dogs	505 Games	505 Games	January 6, 2009 (NA)	No	Yes	Yes	No
Hotel Giant DS	Enlight Software	Nobilis	November 28, 2008 (EU)	No	No	Yes	No
Hotel Transylvania	WayForward	GameMill Publishing	September 18, 2012 (NA)	No	Yes	Yes	No
Hottarake no Shima: Kanata to Nijiiro no Kagami	Climax Entertainment	Bandai Namco Games	August 6, 2009 (JP)	Yes	No	No	No
Houkago Shounen	Konami	Konami	January 31, 2008 (JP)	Yes	No	No	No
House M.D.	Legacy Interactive	Legacy Interactive	December 3, 2010 (AUS)	No	No	Yes	Yes
How to Train Your Dragon	Griptonite Games	Activision	March 23, 2010 (NA)	No	Yes	Yes	Yes
Hudson x GReeeeN Live!? DeeeeS!?	Hudson Soft	Hudson Soft	April 1, 2010 (JP)	Yes	No	No	No
Hugo: Den forsvundne Kaempe	Krea Media	Krea Media	2012 (EU)	No	No	Yes	No
Hugo: Magic In The Troll Woods	Attractive Games	Rough Trade	February 4, 2010 (EU)	No	No	Yes	No
Hugo: Trollakademin 2 - Jakten pa Kristallkartan; Hugo: Troldeakademiet - Kampen om Krystalkortet^{DK}	Krea Media	Krea Media	2012 (EU)	No	No	Yes	No
The Humans: Meet the Ancestors!	Blue Monkey Studios	Deep Silver	July 28, 2009 (NA)	No	Yes	Yes	No
Hurry Up Hedgehog!	Ivolgamus	Oxygen Games	March 28, 2008 (PAL)	No	Yes	Yes	No
Hysteria Hospital: Emergency Ward	Gameinvest	Oxygen Games	June 16, 2009 (NA)	No	Yes	Yes	No
I Heart Geeks!	SevenOne Intermedia	cvd Software	December 20, 2011 (NA)	No	Yes	No	No
I Love Babies; My Little Baby^{EU}	dtp Young Entertainment AG	cvd Software	December 20, 2011 (NA)	No	Yes	Yes	No
I Love Beauty: Hollywood Makeover	City Interactive	City Interactive	May 20, 2009 (NA)	No	Yes	No	No
I Love Horses	Destineer	Bold Games	April 27, 2009 (NA)	No	Yes	Yes	No
I Love Puppies	Destineer	Bold Games	October 18, 2010 (NA)	No	Yes	Yes	No
I Spy: Castle	Big Blue Bubble	Scholastic Corporation	October 25, 2011 (NA)	No	Yes	Yes	No
I Spy: Fun House	Big Blue Bubble	Scholastic Corporation	August 29, 2007 (NA)	No	Yes	Yes	No
I Spy: Universe	Big Blue Bubble	Scholastic Corporation	June 18, 2010 (NA)	No	Yes	Yes	No
I'm A Celebrity... Get Me Out of Here!	Mindscape	Mindscape	November 20, 2009 (AU)	No	No	Yes	Yes
iCarly	Activision	Activision	October 23, 2009 (NA)	No	Yes	Yes	Yes
iCarly 2: iJoin the Click!	Activision	Activision	November 16, 2010 (NA)	No	Yes	Yes	Yes
iCarly: Groovy Foodie!	WayForward	D3 Publisher	June 12, 2012 (NA)	No	Yes	Yes	Yes
Ice Age 2: The Meltdown	Amaze Entertainment	Sierra Entertainment, Vivendi Games	March 14, 2006 (NA)	Yes	Yes	Yes	No
Ice Age: Continental Drift – Arctic Games	Behaviour Interactive	Activision	June 29, 2012 (EU)	No	Yes	Yes	No
Ice Age: Dawn of the Dinosaurs	Eurocom	Activision	June 30, 2009 (NA)	No	Yes	Yes	No
Ico Soccer	Artematica	Black Bean Games	June 26, 2009 (EU)	No	No	Yes	Yes
Idaten Jump DS: Moero! Flame Kaiser	Taito	Taito	September 7, 2006 (JP)	Yes	No	No	No
Idol Janshi Suchie-Pai III Remix	Jaleco Entertainment	Jaleco Entertainment	July 26, 2007 (JP)	Yes	No	No	No
The Idolm@ster: Dearly Stars	Microvision	Bandai Namco Games	September 17, 2009 (JP)	Yes	No	No	No
Igor	Santa Cruz Games	Legacy Interactive	September 11, 2008 (NA)	No	Yes	Yes	No
Ikatan: Ikamono Tantei	Edge WORKS	CyberFront	November 13, 2008 (JP)	Yes	No	No	No
Ikou: Intelligenztrainer fur Kids	Scheimann & Team	HMH Interactive	August 25, 2009 (EU)	No	No	Yes	No
IL-2 Sturmovik: Birds of Prey	DiP Interactive	1C Company, 505 Games	September 3, 2009 (AU)	No	Yes	Yes	Yes
Illust Logic DS + Colorful Logic	Hudson Soft	Hudson Soft	October 25, 2007 (JP)	Yes	No	No	No
The Illust Puzzle & Suuji Puzzle 2	D3 Publisher	D3 Publisher	November 29, 2007 (JP)	Yes	No	No	No
Imagine: Animal Doctor	Ubisoft	Ubisoft	October 23, 2007 (NA)	No	Yes	Yes	No
Imagine: Animal Doctor Care Center	Ubisoft	Ubisoft	May 18, 2010 (NA)	No	Yes	Yes	No
Imagine: Artist	Ubisoft	Ubisoft	October 27, 2009 (NA)	No	Yes	No	No
Imagine: Babysitters; Imagine: Baby Club^{EU}	Ubisoft	Ubisoft	September 19, 2008 (EU)	No	Yes	Yes	No
Imagine: Babyz; Imagine: Babies^{EU}	Ubisoft	Ubisoft	October 23, 2007 (NA)	No	Yes	Yes	Yes
Imagine: Babyz Fashion; Baby Fashion star^{EU}	Ubisoft	Ubisoft	November 3, 2009 (NA)	No	Yes	Yes	Yes
Imagine: Ballet Star	Spike	Ubisoft, Spike	November 18, 2008 (NA)	Yes	Yes	Yes	Yes
Imagine: Boutique Owner	Ubisoft	Ubisoft	June 2, 2009 (NA)	No	Yes	Yes	Yes
Imagine: Cheerleader	1st Playable Productions	Ubisoft	January 27, 2009 (NA)	No	Yes	No	No
Imagine: Detective	Ubisoft	Ubisoft	September 8, 2009 (NA)	No	Yes	Yes	Yes
Imagine: Family Doctor	Wizarbox	Ubisoft	March 31, 2009 (NA)	No	Yes	Yes	No
Imagine: Fashion Designer	Ubisoft	Ubisoft	October 23, 2007 (NA)	No	Yes	Yes	No
Imagine: Fashion Designer New York	Virtual Toys, Lexis Numerique	Ubisoft	September 19, 2008 (EU)	No	Yes	Yes	No
Imagine: Fashion Designer World Tour	Virtual Toys	Ubisoft	October 20, 2009 (NA)	No	Yes	Yes	Yes
Imagine: Fashion Paradise	Ubisoft	Ubisoft	November 5, 2010 (NA)	No	Yes	Yes	No
Imagine: Fashion Stylist	Ubisoft	Ubisoft	November 3, 2010 (NA)	No	Yes	Yes	No
Imagine: Figure Skater	Ubisoft Paris, Spike	Ubisoft, Spike	March 15, 2007 (JP)	Yes	No	No	No
Imagine: Ice Champions	Spike	Spike, Ubisoft	December 13, 2007 (JP)	Yes	Yes	No	No
Imagine: Interior Designer	Ubisoft	Ubisoft	November 4, 2008 (NA)	No	Yes	Yes	Yes
Imagine: Makeup Artist	Ubisoft	Ubisoft	July 10, 2008 (JP)	Yes	Yes	No	No
Imagine: Master Chef	MTO	MTO, Ubisoft	September 14, 2007 (PAL)	Yes	Yes	Yes	No
Imagine: Movie Star	Powerhead Games, Ubisoft	Ubisoft	November 18, 2008 (NA)	No	Yes	Yes	Yes
Imagine: Music Fest	Ubisoft	Ubisoft	May 5, 2009 (NA)	No	Yes	No	No
Imagine: Party Planner	Ubisoft	Ubisoft	January 26, 2010 (NA)	No	Yes	No	No
Imagine: Reporter	Ubisoft	Ubisoft	September 28, 2009 (NA)	No	Yes	Yes	No
Imagine: Resort Owner; Imagine: Dream Resort^{EU}	Ubisoft	Ubisoft	October 26, 2010 (NA)	No	Yes	Yes	No
Imagine: Rock Star	Gevo Entertainment	Ubisoft	June 17, 2008 (PAL)	No	Yes	Yes	No
Imagine: Salon Stylist	Ubisoft	Ubisoft	September 29, 2009 (NA)	No	Yes	Yes	Yes
Imagine: Soccer Captain	Ubisoft	Ubisoft	August 11, 2009 (NA)	No	Yes	No	No
Imagine: Sweet 16	Ubisoft	Ubisoft	October 13, 2009 (NA)	No	Yes	No	No
Imagine: Teacher	Magic Pockets	Ubisoft	August 12, 2008 (NA)	No	Yes	Yes	No
Imagine: Teacher Class Trip	Ubisoft	Ubisoft	August 25, 2009 (NA)	No	Yes	Yes	Yes
Imagine: Wedding Designer	Lexis Numerique, Ubisoft, Virtual Toys	Ubisoft	October 6, 2009 (NA)	No	Yes	Yes	Yes
Imagine: Zookeeper; Imagine: Wildlife Keeper^{EU}	Ubisoft	Ubisoft	November 4, 2008 (NA)	No	Yes	Yes	Yes
Imasugu Tsukaeru Mamechishiki: Quiz Zatsugaku-Ou DS	Jaleco Entertainment	Kamui	February 11, 2010 (JP)	Yes	No	No	No
Impossible Mission	System 3	Play It!, System 3, Warner Bros. Interactive Entertainment	August 31, 2007 (JP)	No	Yes	Yes	No
Inazuma Eleven 2: Blizzard	Level-5	Level-5	October 1, 2009 (JP)	Yes	No	Yes	No
Inazuma Eleven 2: Firestorm	Level-5	Level-5	October 1, 2009 (JP)	Yes	No	Yes	No
Inazuma Eleven 3: Sekai e no Chousen!! Bomber	Level-5	Level-5	July 1, 2010 (JP)	Yes	No	No	No
Inazuma Eleven 3: Sekai e no Chousen!! Spark	Level-5	Level-5	July 1, 2010 (JP)	Yes	No	No	No
Inazuma Eleven 3: Sekai e no Chousen!! The Ogre	Level-5	Level-5	December 16, 2010 (JP)	Yes	No	No	No
Inazuma Eleven	Level-5	Level-5	August 22, 2008 (JP)	Yes	No	Yes	No
The Incredible Hulk	Amaze Entertainment	Sega	June 5, 2008 (NA)	No	Yes	Yes	No
Indiana Jones and the Staff of Kings	LucasArts	Activision, LucasArts	June 9, 2009 (NA)	No	Yes	Yes	No
Indianapolis 500 Legends	Torus Games	Destineer	December 19, 2007 (NA)	No	Yes	No	No
Indoor Sports Club	White Park Bay	White Park Bay	December 5, 2008 (EU)	No	No	Yes	No
Infinite Space	Nude Maker, PlatinumGames	Sega	June 11, 2009 (JP)	Yes	Yes	Yes	No
Inkheart	DreamCatcher Games	The Adventure Company	January 12, 2009 (NA)	No	Yes	Yes	No
Insecticide	Crackpot Entertainment, Creat Studios	Gamecock Media Group	March 11, 2008 (NA)	No	Yes	No	No
Intellivision Lives!	Intellivision Productions	Virtual Play Inc.	November 2, 2010 (NA)	No	Yes	Yes	No
Interactive Storybook Series 1	Tommo	Tommo	September 18, 2007 (NA)	No	Yes	No	No
Interactive Storybook Series 2	Tommo	Tommo	October 26, 2007 (NA)	No	Yes	No	No
Interactive Storybook Series 3	Tommo	Tommo	October 26, 2007 (NA)	No	Yes	No	No
Intervilles	Mindscape	Mindscape	June 10, 2008 (EU)	No	No	Yes	No
Inu Kaisha	CyberFront	CyberFront	March 26, 2009 (JP)	Yes	No	No	No
Inugamike no Ichizoku	From Software	From Software	January 22, 2009 (JP)	Yes	No	No	No
InuYasha: Secret of the Divine Jewel	Namco Bandai Games	Namco Bandai Games	January 23, 2007 (NA)	No	Yes	No	No
Iraroji VOW	From Software	From Software	May 24, 2007 (JP)	Yes	No	No	No
Iron Chef America: Supreme Cuisine	Black Lantern Studios	Destineer	October 21, 2008 (NA)	No	Yes	No	No
Iron Feather	Konami	Konami	January 19, 2006 (JP)	Yes	No	No	No
Iron Man	Artificial Mind and Movement	Sega	May 2, 2008 (PAL, NA)	No	Yes	Yes	No
Iron Man 2	Sega	Sega	April 29, 2010 (AU)	No	Yes	Yes	Yes
Iron Master: The Legendary Blacksmith	Genterprise	Genterprise	May 24, 2007 (JP)	Yes	No	No	No
Irozuki Tingle no Koi no Balloon Trip	Vanpool	Nintendo	August 6, 2009 (JP)	Yes	No	No	No
Ishin no Arashi: Shippuu Ryuumeden	Koei Tecmo Games	Koei Tecmo Games	November 18, 2009 (JP)	Yes	No	No	No
Itadaki Street DS	Armor Project	Square Enix	June 21, 2007 (JP)	Yes	No	No	No
Item Getter: Bokura no Kagaku to Mahou no Kankei	Aspect	5pb	August 6, 2009 (JP)	Yes	No	No	No
Itouke no Urawaza DS (Note: Primarily a household-tips application, though it includes mini-games such as washing a dirty panda and deliberately losing at rock paper scissors.)	Spike	Spike	December 4, 2008 (JP)	Yes	No	No	No
Itsu Demo Doko Demo Dekiru Igo: AI Igo DS	Marvelous Entertainment	Marvelous Entertainment	February 23, 2006 (JP)	Yes	No	No	No
Itsu Demo Doko Demo Dekiru Shogi: AI Shogi DS	Marvelous Entertainment	Marvelous Entertainment	February 23, 2006 (JP)	Yes	No	No	No
Itsu Demo Doko Demo: Onita Atsushi no Seiji Quiz DS	Marvelous Entertainment	Marvelous Entertainment	September 27, 2007 (JP)	Yes	No	No	No
Ivy the Kiwi?	Prope	Namco Bandai Games, Xseed Games, Rising Star Games	April 22, 2010 (JP)	Yes	Yes	Yes	No
Izuna 2: The Unemployed Ninja Returns	Ninja Studio, Success	Atlus, Success	November 29, 2007 (JP)	Yes	Yes	No	No
Izuna: Legend of the Unemployed Ninja	Ninja Studio	505 Games, Atlus, Success	June 8, 2006 (JP)	Yes	Yes	Yes	No

== Applications ==
There are 480 applications included in the list.

Title	Developer(s)	Publisher(s)	First released	JP	NA	EU	AU
Deep Sea Aquarium By DS; Deep Aquarium: Kiseki no Shinkai^{JP}	Collavier	Ertain	June 5, 2008 (JP)	Yes	No	Yes	No
Der Gesundheitscoach: Wohlfuhlen jeden Tag	International Arts	SevenOne Intermedia	February 16, 2010 (EU)	No	No	Yes	No
Deutsch: 1.-4. Klasse - Fit fuers Gymnasium	Franzis Verlag	Franzis Verlag	2008 (EU)	No	No	Yes	No
Deutsch: 1.-4. Klasse 2012	Franzis Verlag	Franzis Verlag	2008 (EU)	No	No	Yes	No
Doko Demo Raku Raku! DS Kakeibo	Bandai Namco Games	Bandai Namco Games	December 7, 2006 (JP)	Yes	No	No	No
Dragon Zakura DS	EA Japan	Electronic Arts	March 8, 2007 (JP)	Yes	No	No	No
Drivers' Ed Portable; CNAE Aprende con Nosotros - Driver's Ed^{IT}	Trine Games	DreamCatcher Interactive	October 17, 2008 (EU)	No	Yes	Yes	No
DS Bimoji Training	indieszero	Nintendo	March 13, 2008 (JP)	Yes	No	No	No
DS Bitamin Widaehan Babsang Malhaneun!: Geongangyoli Giljabi	Skonec	Nintendo	October 16, 2008 (JP)	Yes	No	No	No
DS Bungaku Zenshuu	Genius Sonority Inc.	Nintendo	October 18, 2007 (JP)	Yes	No	No	No
DS de Classic Kiite Mimasenka?	iNiS	Square Enix	July 5, 2007 (JP)	Yes	No	No	No
DS de Yomu Series: Tezuka Osamu Hi no Tori 1	Compile Heart	Compile Heart	July 31, 2008 (JP)	Yes	No	No	No
DS de Yomu Series: Tezuka Osamu Hi no Tori 2	Compile Heart	Compile Heart	July 31, 2008 (JP)	Yes	No	No	No
DS de Yomu Series: Tezuka Osamu Hi no Tori 3	Compile Heart	Compile Heart	July 31, 2008 (JP)	Yes	No	No	No
DS Kageyama Method - Dennou Hanpuku: Tadashii Kanji Kakitori-Kun	Jupiter Corporation	Shogakukan	April 5, 2007 (JP)	Yes	No	No	No
DS Kageyama Method Dennou Hanpuku: Masu x Masu Hyaku Masu Keisan	Jupiter Corporation	Shogakukan	December 7, 2006 (JP)	Yes	No	No	No
DS Kageyama Method: Dennou Hanpuku - Chiri - Rekishi - Koumin - Maru x Maru Shakaika	Jupiter Corporation	Shogakukan	January 28, 2010 (JP)	Yes	No	No	No
DS Kageyama Method: Tadashii Kanji Kakitori-Kun - Kondo wa Kanken Taisaku Dayo!	Jupiter Corporation	Shogakukan	November 29, 2007 (JP)	Yes	No	No	No
DS Rakubiki Jiten	Nintendo	Nintendo	June 16, 2005 (JP)	Yes	No	No	No
DS Uranai Seikatsu	Nintendo	Nintendo	January 15, 2007 (JP)	Yes	No	No	No
Duden: Einfach Klasse in Deutsch 1.-2. Klasse	Cornelsen Verlag	Cornelsen Verlag	2008 (EU)	No	No	Yes	No
Duden: Einfach Klasse in Deutsch 3.-4. Klasse	Cornelsen Verlag	Cornelsen Verlag	2008 (EU)	No	No	Yes	No
Duden: Einfach Klasse in Mathematik 1.-2. Klasse	Cornelsen Verlag	Cornelsen Verlag	2008 (EU)	No	No	Yes	No
Duden: Einfach Klasse in Mathematik 3.-4. Klasse	Cornelsen Verlag	Cornelsen Verlag	2008 (EU)	No	No	Yes	No
Duke Saraie no Kenkou Walking Navi	Dorart	Dorart	May 17, 2007 (JP)	Yes	No	No	No
Déco Tendances	Neko Entertainment	Neko Entertainment	2008 (EU)	No	No	Yes	No
Eibun Tadoku DS: Sekai no Bungaku Senshuu	IE Institute	IE Institute	February 12, 2009 (JP)	Yes	No	No	No
Eibun Tadoku DS: Sekai no Meisaku Douwa	IE Institute	IE Institute	February 12, 2009 (JP)	Yes	No	No	No
Eigo o Taberu Fushigi na Ikimono Marsh	Microvision	Dimple Entertainment	October 25, 2007 (JP)	Yes	No	No	No
Eijukugo Target 1000 DS	IE Institute	IE Institute	August 9, 2007 (JP)	Yes	No	No	No
Eiken DS	AI	Rocket Company	September 27, 2007 (JP)	Yes	No	No	No
Eiken DS Training	Spiel	IE Institute	September 13, 2007 (JP)	Yes	No	No	No
Eiken-Ou: 2-Kyuuhen	Gakken	Gakken	April 26, 2007 (JP)	Yes	No	No	No
Eiken-Ou: 3-Kyuuhen	Gakken	Gakken	April 26, 2007 (JP)	Yes	No	No	No
Eiken-Ou: 4-Kyuuhen	Gakken	Gakken	April 26, 2007 (JP)	Yes	No	No	No
Eiken-Ou: Jun-2-Kyuuhen	Gakken	Gakken	August 30, 2007 (JP)	Yes	No	No	No
Eikoh Seminar Koushiki DS Kyouzai: Chuugaku Eitango - Eitan Zamurai DS	Good-Feel	Educational Network	March 26, 2009 (JP)	Yes	No	No	No
Eikoh Seminar Koushiki DS Kyouzai: Koukou Eitango - Eitan Zamurai DS	Good-Feel	Educational Network	June 11, 2009 (JP)	Yes	No	No	No
Eikoh Seminar Koushiki DS Kyouzai: Shougakkou Eigo - Eitan Zamurai DS	Good-Feel	Educational Network	March 26, 2009 (JP)	Yes	No	No	No
Eitango Target 1900 DS	IE Institute	IE Institute	August 10, 2006 (JP)	Yes	No	No	No
Electroplankton	Indies Zero	Nintendo	April 7, 2005 (JP)	Yes	Yes	Yes	No
Enpitsu de Oku no Hosomichi DS	Beyond Interactive	Success	May 31, 2007 (JP)	Yes	No	No	No
EQ Trainer DS: Dekiru Otona no Communication Jutsu	Bullets	Takara Tomy	March 8, 2007 (JP)	Yes	No	No	No
ESSE Shikkari Kakeibo DS	IE Institute	IE Institute	October 25, 2007 (JP)	Yes	No	No	No
Face Training	Intelligent Systems	Nintendo	August 2, 2007 (JP)	Yes	No	No	No
fit For Fun	bitComposer	bitComposer	2010 (EU)	No	No	Yes	No
Flips: Artemis Fowl	Electronic Arts	Electronic Arts	December 3, 2009 (EU)	No	No	Yes	No
Flips: Cathy Cassidy	Electronic Arts	Electronic Arts	December 4, 2009 (EU)	No	No	Yes	No
Flips: Enid Blyton - Faraway Tree Stories	Electronic Arts	Electronic Arts	December 4, 2009 (EU)	No	No	Yes	No
Flips: Enid Blyton - The Adventure Series	Electronic Arts	Electronic Arts	April 23, 2010 (EU)	No	No	Yes	No
Flips: Mr. Gum	Electronic Arts	Electronic Arts	April 23, 2010 (EU)	No	No	Yes	No
Flips: Percy Jackson	Electronic Arts	Electronic Arts	February 12, 2010 (EU)	No	No	Yes	No
Flips: Too Ghoul for School	Electronic Arts	Electronic Arts	December 4, 2009 (EU)	No	No	Yes	No
Food Coach; Besser Essen: Leben Leicht Gemacht	Zushi Games Ltd	SevenOne Intermedia	February 25, 2009 (EU)	No	No	Yes	No
Fujimori Midori no Let's Tarot	ASNetworks	ASNetworks	December 13, 2007 (JP)	Yes	No	No	No
futureU	Aspyr Media	Aspyr Media	November 3, 2008 (NA)	No	Yes	No	No
Gakken Chuugokugo Sanmai DS	Gakken	Gakken	July 10, 2008 (JP)	Yes	No	No	No
Gakken Chuugokugo Sanmai DS: Kiki-Tore & Shoki-Tore	Gakken	Gakken	March 17, 2011 (JP)	Yes	No	No	No
Gakken DS: Otona no Gakushuu Kindaichi Sensei no Nihongo Lesson	Gakken	Gakken	February 22, 2007 (JP)	Yes	No	No	No
Gakken DS: Shin TOEIC Test Kanzen Kouryaku	Gakken	Gakken	September 13, 2007 (JP)	Yes	No	No	No
Gakken Eigo Sanmai DS	Gakken	Gakken	November 26, 2009 (JP)	Yes	No	No	No
Gakken Europa 4: Kokugo Sanmai DS	Gakken	Gakken	March 11, 2010 (JP)	Yes	No	No	No
Gakken Hangul Sanmai DS	Gakken	Gakken	March 19, 2009 (JP)	Yes	No	No	No
Gakken Hangul-Go Sanmai DS: Kiki-Tore & Shoki-Tore	Gakken	Gakken	March 17, 2011 (JP)	Yes	No	No	No
Gakken M Bunko: Monoshiri Edo Meijin	Gakken	Gakken	April 10, 2008 (JP)	Yes	No	No	No
Gakken Mainichi no Drill DS: Mesaze! Miracle Shougaku 1 Nensei	Gakken	Gakken	July 19, 2008 (JP)	Yes	No	No	No
Gakken Mu Henshuubu Kanshuu: Choujou Genshou Research File	Gakken	Gakken	September 11, 2008 (JP)	Yes	No	No	No
Gakken Taigo: Indonesia-Go Sanmai DS	Gakken	Gakken	October 14, 2010 (JP)	Yes	No	No	No
Gakken: Shin TOEIC Test Kanzen Kouryaku 2	Gakken	Gakken	March 19, 2009 (JP)	Yes	No	No	No
Game o Shinagara Kaiwa o Tanoshimu! Voice Chat DS	Happinet	Happinet	December 4, 2008 (JP)	Yes	No	No	No
Ganbaru Watashi no Kakei Diary	Syn Sophia	Nintendo	July 12, 2007 (JP)	Yes	No	No	No
Gardening Guide	Mindscape	Mindscape	August 14, 2009 (EU)	No	No	Yes	No
Gijutsu Hyouronsha Kanshuu: Kihonjouhou Gijutsusha DS	First IDC	First IDC	March 31, 2011 (JP)	Yes	No	No	No
Grundschule 1.-4. Klasse: Fit fuers Gymnasium	Franzis Verlag	Franzis Verlag	2008 (EU)	No	No	Yes	No
Grundschule 1.-4. Klasse: Fit fuers Gymnasium 2010	Franzis Verlag	Franzis Verlag	2009 (EU)	No	No	Yes	No
Grundschule 1.-4. Klasse: Fit fuers Gymnasium 2012	Franzis Verlag	Franzis Verlag	2011 (EU)	No	No	Yes	No
Grundschule 1.-4. Klasse: Fit fuers Gymnasium 2013	Franzis Verlag	Franzis Verlag	2012 (EU)	No	No	Yes	No
Grundschule 1.-4. Klasse: Fit fuers Gymnasium 2014	Franzis Verlag	Franzis Verlag	2013 (EU)	No	No	Yes	No
Gyakuten Saiban Jiten	Capcom	Capcom	April 12, 2007 (JP)	Yes	No	No	No
Hana Saku DS Gardening Life	Elements	Square Enix	July 5, 2007 (JP)	Yes	No	No	No
Heisei Kyouiku Iinkai DS	Bandai	Bandai Namco Games	December 21, 2006 (JP)	Yes	No	No	No
Heisei Kyouiku Iinkai DS: Zenkoku Touitsu Moshi Special	Bandai	Bandai Namco Games	December 20, 2007 (JP)	Yes	No	No	No
Hello Kitty Daily	Dorasu	Aspyr	November 14, 2008 (JP)	Yes	No	No	No
HMH Vokabeltrainer: Englisch	HMH Interactive	HMH Interactive	2008 (EU)	No	No	Yes	No
HMH Vokabeltrainer: Franzoesisch	HMH Interactive	HMH Interactive	2008 (EU)	No	No	Yes	No
HMH Vokabeltrainer: Spanisch	HMH Interactive	HMH Interactive	2008 (EU)	No	No	Yes	No
Hokkaidou Hatsu!! Dosanko Wide ga DS ni Narimashita! Hoshizawa Sachiko no Temanashi Raku Raku Gohan	Comolink	Comolink	April 16, 2009 (JP)	Yes	No	No	No
Home Designer: Perfekt Gestylte Zimmer	TREVA Entertainment	TREVA Entertainment	2010 (EU)	No	No	Yes	No
Honki de Manabu: LEC de Goukaku - DS Hishou Kentei 2-Kyuu/3-Kyuu	Square Enix	Square Enix	February 26, 2009 (JP)	Yes	No	No	No
Honki de Manabu: LEC de Goukaku - DS Takuchi Tatemono Torihiki Shuninsha	Square Enix	Square Enix	February 26, 2009 (JP)	Yes	No	No	No
Honki de Manabu: LEC de Goukakuru - DS Gyouseishoshi	Square Enix	Square Enix	September 2, 2010 (JP)	Yes	No	No	No
Honki de Manabu: LEC de Goukakuru - DS Kikenbutsu Toriatsukaimono Otsushu 4-Rui	Square Enix	Square Enix	December 3, 2009 (JP)	Yes	No	No	No
Honki de Manabu: LEC de Goukakuru - DS Koumuinshiken Suumato Shori	Square Enix	Square Enix	December 3, 2009 (JP)	Yes	No	No	No
Honki de Manabu: LEC de Goukakuru - DS Takuchi Tatemono Torihiki Shuninsha 2011-Toshi & 2012-Toshi Nendoban	Square Enix	Square Enix	February 3, 2011 (JP)	Yes	No	No	No
Hoshizora Navi	AstroArts	ASCII Media Works	March 26, 2009 (JP)	Yes	No	No	No
How To Pass Your Driving Test	Route 1 Games	Ubisoft	November 21, 2008 (EU)	No	No	Yes	No
Ichido wa Yonde de Okitai Nihon Bungaku 100-Sen	Spike	Spike	July 26, 2007 (JP)	Yes	No	No	No
Imi made Wakaru Otona no Jukugo Renshuu: Kadokawa Ruigo Shinjiten Kara 5-Man Mon	Now Production	Now Production	January 15, 2009 (JP)	Yes	No	No	No
Indo Shiki Keisan Drill DS	GungHo	GungHo	February 28, 2008 (JP)	Yes	No	No	No
Ippan Zaidan Houjin: Nippon Kanji Shuujukudo Kentei Kikou Kounen - Tsuutenkaku DS	Now Production	Now Production	June 10, 2010 (JP)	Yes	No	No	No
It's tehodoki! Hannya Shingyou Nyuumon	ASNetworks	ASNetworks	August 9, 2007 (JP)	Yes	No	No	No
Itsumono Shokuzai de Dekichau Suteki na Sweets to Gochisou	Aspect	Takara Tomy	December 20, 2007 (JP)	Yes	No	No	No

== Bundles ==
There are 42 games included in the list.

Title	Developer(s)	Publisher(s)	First released	JP	NA	EU	AU
Disney Two Pack - Frozen: Olaf's Quest + Big Hero 6: Battle in the Bay	1st Playable Productions	GameMill Entertainment	October 20, 2015 (NA)	No	Yes	No	No
Disney's The Little Mermaid: Ariel's Undersea Adventure / Princess: Magical Jewels	Disney Interactive Studios	Disney Interactive Studios	August 22, 2008 (EU)	No	No	Yes	No
Drawn to Life Collection	THQ	THQ	November 23, 2010 (NA)	No	Yes	Yes	Yes
DreamWorks 2-in-1 Party Pack	Activision	Activision	September 22, 2010 (NA)	No	Yes	No	No
DreamWorks Madagascar / Shrek: Super Slam 2-in-1 Combo Pack	Activision	Activision	September 5, 2006 (NA)	No	Yes	No	No
DreamWorks Madagascar 3 & The Croods: Combo Pack	Torus Games	D3Publisher	November 15, 2013 (NA)	No	Yes	Yes	No
DS Dengeki Bunko: Iria no Sora, UFO no Natsu I-II	Media Works	Media Works	October 25, 2007 (JP)	Yes	No	No	No
Dual Pack: Pac-Man World 3 / Namco Museum DS	Namco Bandai Games	Namco Bandai Games	October 30, 2012 (NA)	No	Yes	No	No
G.G Series Collection Plus	Suzak	Genterprise	May 27, 2010 (JP)	Yes	No	No	No
Guitar Hero: On Tour & Guitar Hero: On Tour Decades	Activision	Activision	November 16, 2008 (NA)	No	Yes	No	No
Happily Ever After Volume 1	Enjoy Gaming	Storm City Games	April 11, 2010 (NA)	No	Yes	No	No
Happily Ever After Volume 2	Enjoy Gaming	Storm City Games	April 11, 2010 (NA)	No	Yes	No	No
Higurashi no Naku Koro ni Kizuna: Ichi-Ni Maki Pack	Alchemist	Alchemist	December 24, 2009 (JP)	Yes	No	No	No
I Spy: Game Pack - I Spy Universe / I Spy Fun House	Scholastic, Inc.	Scholastic, Inc.	2012 (NA)	No	Yes	No	No

== Other ==
Title	Developer(s)	Publisher(s)	First released	JP	NA	EU	AU
eCrew Development Program	Nintendo European Research & Development	Nintendo	April 12, 2010 (JP)	Yes	No	No	No
eSMART 2.0	Nintendo European Research & Development	Nintendo	2010 (JP)	Yes	No	No	No

== See also ==
- List of DSiWare games and applications
- List of Game Boy games
- List of Game Boy Advance games
- List of Game Boy Color games
- List of Nintendo DS Wi-Fi Connection games
- List of Wii games
- Lists of video games
