= ECDP =

ECDP or eCDP may refer to:

- eCrew Development Program, 2010 video game developed by McDonalds
- Entesa Catalana de Progrés, political coalition in Catalonia
- European Cash Duty Paid, Aluminium Premium
