= Hilton Garden Inn: Ultimate Team Play =

2009 video game

- Developer: Virtual Heroes
- Publisher: Virtual Heroes
- Engine: Vicious Engine
- Platform: PlayStation Portable
- Release: January 2009
- Genre: Simulation
- Mode: Single-player

Hilton Garden Inn: Ultimate Team Play is a simulation game for the Sony PlayStation Portable, developed by Virtual Heroes for Hilton Garden Inn using the Vicious Engine, and released on Universal Media Disc. The game was announced in 2008 and released in January 2009.

The game is a simulation training game in which the player is a worker in a hotel of the Hilton Garden Inn chain, and must complete various tasks satisfactorily in order to obtain a good score. The tasks include cleaning the hotel guest rooms, manning the hotel reception desk, managing the hotel restaurant, and interacting with the guests appropriately.

== See also ==
- eCrew Development Program
