= Deal or No Deal (video game) =

2006 video game

- PC version cover featuring host Howie Mandel on it
- Developers: Gravity-i (NDS/GBA); Imagination Entertainment (DVD); Cat Daddy Games (PC); Black Lantern Studios (Wii); Vimukti Technologies Pvt Ltd (BlackBerry) iWin (PC, iOS, Android)
- Publishers: DSI Games (NA, NDS/GBA); Imagination Entertainment (DVD); Global Star Software (NA, PC); Zoo Games (Wii, NDS Special Edition); Vimukti Technologies Pvt Ltd (BlackBerry) iWin (PC, iOS, Android)
- Composers: Frédéric Motte; Allister Brimble (Nintendo DS); Martijn Schimmer (PC, Wii)
- Platforms: DVD player, Game Boy Advance, Nintendo DS, Wii, Windows, iOS, Android, BlackBerry
- Release: November 6, 2006: Windows; NA: November 6, 2006 DVD player November 20, 2006 Game Boy Advance; NA: July 18, 2007 Nintendo DS; NA: July 23, 2007 Wii; NA: January 20, 2009 BlackBerry July 22, 2010 Special Edition September 13, 2010 (Wii) October 26, 2010 (DS)
- Genre: Trivia

Deal or No Deal is a video game based upon the American television show of the same name. It was released for Microsoft Windows, Game Boy Advance, Nintendo DS, Wii, iOS, Android and BlackBerry, and is available as a DVD TV game. A "special edition" of the game was later published by Zoo Games for the Nintendo Wii on September 13, 2010 and the Nintendo DS on October 26, 2010.

== Reception ==
Reception

Aggregate scores
Aggregator	Score			
Aggregator	DS	GBA	PC	Wii
GameRankings	21%	16%	25%	54%
Metacritic	20/100	N/A	25/100	56/100

Review scores
Publication	Score			
Publication	DS	GBA	PC	Wii
GameSpot	1.5/10	N/A	4.1/10	N/A
GameZone	1.8/10	N/A	N/A	5.8/10
IGN	1.5/10	N/A	3.1/10	5.5/10
NGamer	4%	N/A	N/A	N/A
PC Zone	N/A	N/A	3%	N/A

The Wii version of Deal or No Deal received "mixed" reviews, while the PC and DS versions received "generally unfavorable reviews", according to the review aggregation website Metacritic.

IGN criticized the Wii version's character design, calling it "freaktacular". The same website also highly criticized the DS version for its dodgy graphics and called it "broken" (due to the fact that whenever the system is shut down, the money goes back into the same case from the previous game the next time the game is played). GameSpot called the same DS version the most idiot-proof concept in the world.
