= Family Park Tycoon =

2008 video game

- Cover art
- Developer(s): Visual Imagination Software
- Publisher(s): Astragon
- Platform(s): Nintendo DS
- Release: GER: November 17, 2008
- Genre(s): Business simulation game
- Mode(s): Single-player

Family Park Tycoon is a business simulation video game for the Nintendo DS developed by German studio VIS Games and Entertainment, a division of Visual Imagination Games and Software, and published by Astragon. Game play focuses on amusement park management.

Family Park Tycoon has been cancelled in the UK. There will be no UK-version of the game family park tycoon, but the German version includes English language.
