= Doodle Hex =

2008 video game

- Developer: Tragnarion Studios
- Publisher: Pinnacle Software
- Platform: Nintendo DS
- Release: EU: July 11, 2008; AU: September 18, 2008
- Genre: Fighting
- Modes: Single-player, Multiplayer

Doodle Hex is a fighting video game for Nintendo DS. The game was created by Spanish developer Tragnarion Studios and published by Pinnacle Software, in which players much draw runes on the touch screen to attack opponents in order to retrieve all the pieces of the One Wish Rune. A Wii version was planned but cancelled.

== Reception ==
Reception

Aggregate score
Aggregator	Score
Metacritic	68 out of 100

Review scores
Publication	Score
zConnection	85 out of 100
Zentendo	8 out of 10

Doodle Hex received fairly average reviews from critics. The unique battle system was praised but the repetitiveness and relative complexity were panned.
