= Imagine (video game series) =

- Genre: Simulation
- Developers: Lexis Numerique; Magic Pockets; Ubisoft Milan; Ubisoft São Paulo; Virtual Toys; Powerhead Games; Jet Black Games; Spike; MTO
- Publisher: Ubisoft
- Platforms: Nintendo DS, Nintendo 3DS, Wii, Microsoft Windows
- First release: Imagine: Master Chef; October 2007
- Latest release: Imagine: Championship Rider 3D; February 23, 2013

Imagine is a series of simulation video games primarily for the Nintendo DS, Nintendo 3DS, Microsoft Windows, and Wii game consoles, released from October 2007 to February 2013. Imagine video games are aimed primarily at girls aged six to fourteen and are published by Ubisoft.

== Background ==
The Imagine series of games allows players to take on the role of various occupations, such as a fashion designer, rock star, movie star or teacher. Ubisoft became a leader in publishing "games for girls" for the Nintendo DS and Wii through the Imagine, Ener-G, and Petz series.

== Reception ==
IGN stated that Imagine games vary wildly in quality, describing some games as "boring and soulless cash-ins that serves no purpose other than to financially take advantage of uninformed teenage girls" and others as "surprise hits [that] turned out pretty darn well." Likewise, a 2008 feature in Game Developer opined that Ubisoft's "casual titles"—specifically mentioning the Imagine and Petz series—had distinguished themselves by being "well-made non-shovelware" that didn't try to "take advantage of the innocence of the target market."

On the other hand, social researcher Laura Fantone, thought the series reiterated "dated ideas about female achievement" in which beauty—"followed by virtue and exceptional luck"—is foremost in attaining improvement of status.

== Games ==
A large number of games have been released under the Imagine banner. These include:

Title	Original release	Ref.
Imagine: Master Chef •Imagine: Happy Cooking^{EU}	October 2007	
Imagine: Fashion Designer	October 2007	
Imagine: Animal Doctor •Imagine: Pet Vet^{EU}	October 2007	
Imagine: Babyz •Imagine: Babies^{EU}	October 2007	
Imagine: Figure Skater	January 29, 2008	
Imagine: Rock Star •Imagine: Girl Band^{EU} •Imagine: Girls Band^{AU}	March 1, 2008	
Imagine: Teacher	April 15, 2008	
My Secret World by Imagine	May 3, 2008	
Imagine: Babysitters •Imagine: Baby Club^{EU}	June 5, 2008	
Imagine: Modern Dancer •Ener-G Dance Squad^{NA}	June 28, 2008	
Imagine: Fashion Designer New York •Imagine: Fashion Model^{EU}	July 20, 2008	
Imagine: Champion Rider	August 11, 2008	
Imagine: Pet Hospital	September 4, 2008	
Imagine: Interior Designer	October 6, 2008	
Imagine: Wedding Designer •Imagine: Dream Weddings^{EU}	October 31, 2008	
Imagine: Party Babyz	November 12, 2008	
Imagine: Ballet Star •Imagine: Ballet Dancer^{EU}	November 27, 2008	
Imagine: Movie Star	December 2, 2008	
Imagine: Gymnast	December 18, 2008	
Imagine: My Restaurant •Gourmet Chef: Cook Your Way to Fame^{NA}	January 1, 2009	
Imagine: Fashion Party	January 28, 2009	
Imagine: Cheerleader	February 14, 2009	
Imagine: Ice Champions	March 11, 2009	
Imagine: Family Doctor	March 27, 2009	
Imagine: Makeup Artist	April 12, 2009	
Imagine: Music Fest	May 16, 2009	
Imagine: Boutique Owner •Imagine: My Boutique^{AU}	June 2, 2009	
Imagine: Soccer Captain	July 11, 2009	
Imagine: Teacher: Class Trip •Imagine: Teacher: School Trip^{EU}	August 5, 2009	
Imagine: Detective	September 5, 2009	
Imagine: Party Planner	September 15, 2009	
Imagine: Salon Stylist •Imagine Beauty Stylist^{EU}	September 19, 2009	
Imagine: Reporter •Imagine Journalist^{EU}	September 28, 2009	
Imagine: Zookeeper	October 6, 2009	
Imagine: Artist	October 23, 2009	
Imagine: Fashion Designer World Tour	October 20, 2009	
Imagine: Rescue Vet	October 29, 2009	
Imagine: Babyz Fashion	February 3, 2010	
Imagine: Resort Owner •Imagine Dream Resort^{EU}	June 22, 2010	
Imagine: Sweet 16 •Sweet 16^{EU}	October 9, 2010	
Imagine: Animal Doctor Care Center	January 18, 2011	
Imagine: Fashion Stylist •Imagine: Fashion Paradise^{EU}	June 21, 2011	
Imagine: Fashion Life	May 8, 2012	
Imagine: Babies 3D	August 6, 2012	
Imagine: Fashion World 3D	October 27, 2012	
Imagine: Championship Rider 3D	February 23, 2013	
