= Hands On! Tangrams =

2009 video game

- Developer: Island Officials
- Publisher: Storm City Games
- Platform: Nintendo DS
- Release: NA: November 24, 2009
- Genre: Puzzle game
- Modes: Single-player, multiplayer

Hands On! Tangrams is a puzzle game for the Nintendo DS. It was released in North America on November 24, 2009. The game includes tangram puzzles for the player to complete.

== Gameplay ==
There are more than 100 puzzles, grouped into 10 different themes. Pieces are moved by dragging them with the stylus. The L or R triggers rotate pieces, and the Up button on the D-Pad flips a piece. There is a timer on each puzzle, and solving within the time limit earns the player different colored stars. The conditions to obtain stars gets progressively more difficult over the course of the game.

== Reception ==
Reception

Aggregate score
| Aggregator | Score |
|---|---|
| Metacritic | 68/100 |

Review scores
| Publication | Score |
|---|---|
| GameZone | 7.5/10 |
| Nintendo Life | 6/10 |

Hands On! Tangrams received mixed reviews from critics upon release. On Metacritic, the game holds a score of 68/100 based on 5 reviews, indicating "mixed or average reviews".
