= FutureU =

2008 video game

futureU
- Developer: Aspyr Media
- Publisher: Aspyr Media
- Platforms: Mac OS X, Nintendo DS, Windows
- Release: Windows, Mac OS X August 25, 2008; Nintendo DS; November 5, 2008
- Genre: Educational
- Mode: Single-player

futureU is an educational video game developed and published by Aspyr Media on November 5, 2008 for Windows, Mac OS X, and the Nintendo DS, and created in association with test preparation company Kaplan, Inc.

== Gameplay ==
The Reading section, Glyph mode for futureU

Like the SATs, futureU has three sections: Reading, Writing, and Math, each with two subdivisions. Reading has a Glyph mode, which gives the player a word that has a prefix and a suffix. Next to the word are several images that can be used to construct the word. In the other Reading mode, Predictions, sentences with two words missing are shown to the player, who must fill in the blanks.

The Writing section contains the Ante Up Grade and Writing Wrong modes. In Ante Up Grade, the player is given one part of a sentence and three possible phrases that can complete it. The Writer Wrong mode provides a sentence and asks the player to identify if it has any errors; if there is one, then the player must identify where it is. Afterward, the player must choose the phrase that corrects the sentence.

The Math section features the Grid Swap mode that gives the player four math questions and a grid with scrambled numbers; the solutions to each question are found in the grid. The Connection mode lets the player choose one of two problems to solve; four possible solutions are then presented, requiring the player to choose the correct answer to each question.

== Reception ==
futureU was given a score of 6.8 of 10 from video game critic website IGN, which found that the game was a decent and affordable SAT preparation program, despite several interface issues. However, they still recommended preparing for the SATs using different methods, and considered futureU to be only correctional rather than instructional.
