= ECrew Development Program =

Rare educational video game

eCrew Development Program
- Packaging cover art
- Developer: McDonald's (JP)
- Publisher: McDonald's
- Platform: Nintendo DS
- Release: 2010 (Japan); 17 November 2020 (archived reupload)
- Genres: Education, simulation, quiz
- Mode: Single-player

eCrew Development Program (eCDP, Japanese: クルトレ eCDP), known unofficially as the McDonald's Training Game, is an educational video game created by McDonald's. Released for the Nintendo DS in 2010 internally within the Japanese division of McDonald's, it was only ever distributed to the company's own restaurants domestically, and never meant to be released to the public.

== Gameplay ==
eCrew teaches the player how to cook and serve various McDonald's menu items and perform other restaurant tasks, and was used to train new restaurant employees. It has several game modes, including simulations of food preparation and customer interaction. It also has quizzes, player profiles for employees and managers, and performance statistics.

== History ==
It was released in 2010 and was also distributed in tandem with a separate game titled eSMART 2.0 which aimed to train existing employees rather than new ones. A special variant of the Nintendo DSi with the McDonalds logo on it was also given to certain Japanese locations along with eCrew.

== Development ==
eCrew had a budget of ¥200 million and was planned for use in all 3,700 McDonald's locations across Japan by the end of 2010, to which it was distributed together with a DSi (or DS lite) with an embossed McDonald's logo on the front. It is unknown to what extent it was used and for how long.

== Rediscovery ==
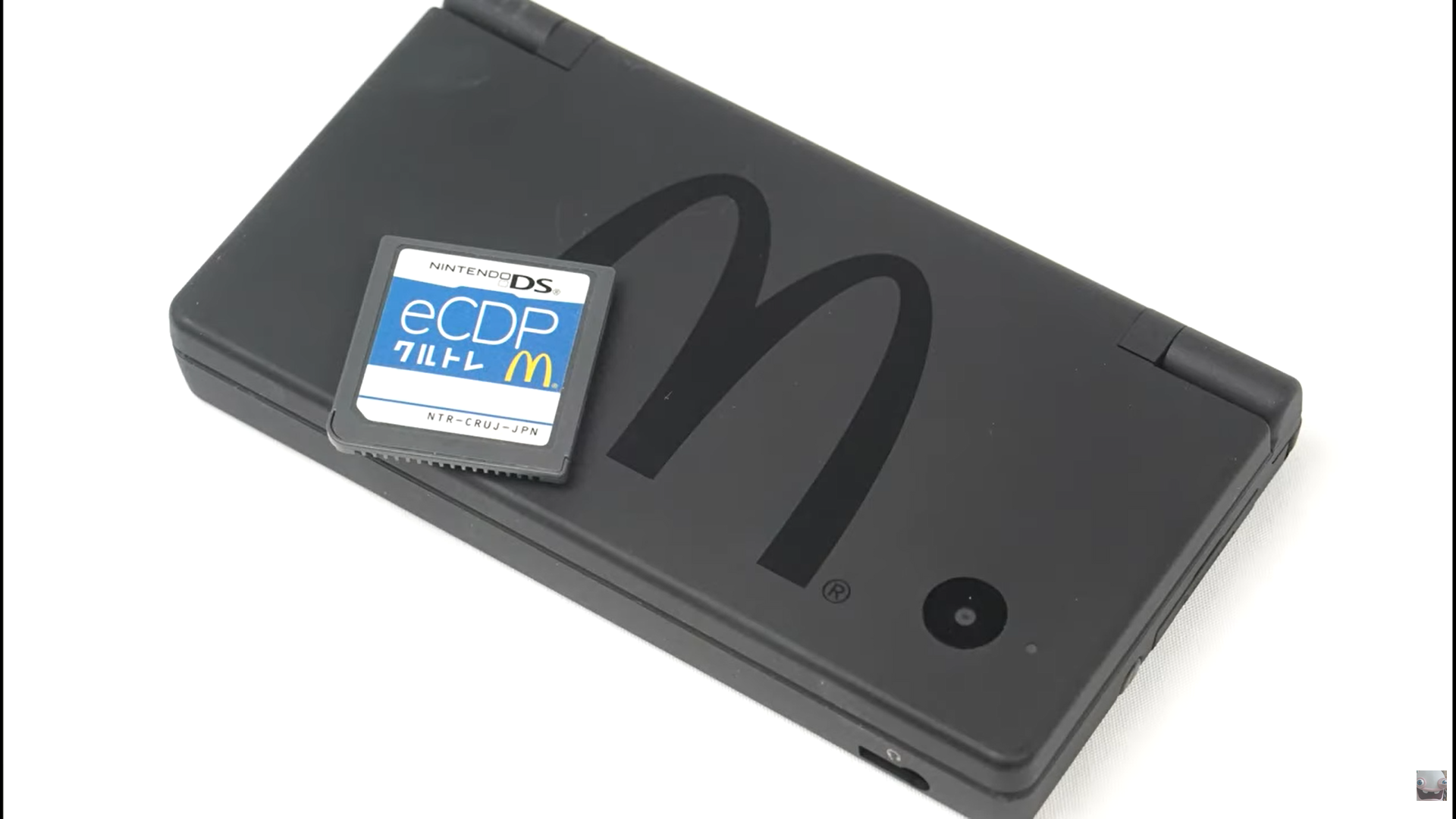
The eCrew Development Program game cartridge on top of the Nintendo DSi

A single copy of eCrew surfaced in September 2020 on an online auction, which was sold to American YouTuber Nick Robinson for around ¥300,000 (US$3,000) on Yahoo Japan through Buyee. Robinson uploaded the cartridge's ROM to the Internet Archive on November 17, 2020, alongside a documentary he produced detailing how he acquired it. The required password to enter in was printed on the McDonald's themed Nintendo DSi Robinson received, however, another person working to find it, Coddy Trentuit, obtained it via inspection of eCrew's data in a hex editor.

On January 12, 2022, the video game preservation group Forest of Illusion, announced the archival of eSMART 2.0, obtained via a private fundraiser.

== See also ==
- Hilton Garden Inn: Ultimate Team Play
