= Interactive children's book =

Subset of children's books

Interactive children's books are a subset of children's books that require participation and interaction by the reader. Participation can range from books with texture to those with special devices used to help teach children certain tools. Interactive children's books may also incorporate modern technology or be computerized. Movable books, a subsection of interactive books, are defined as "covering pop-ups, transformations, tunnel books, volvelles, flaps, pull-tabs, pop-outs, pull-downs, and more, each of which performs in a different manner. Also included, because they employ the same techniques, are three-dimensional greeting cards."

== Volvelles ==
The earliest form of interactive books are thought to be volvelles, a type of movable book with a wheel, which at the time was used to help display astrological and geographical maps. Volvelles were a type of early paper calculators that were designed in a form of a circle layered over each other and tied together with a string in order to spin.

== Coloring books ==
The coloring book promotes motor skills, development, and eye-hand coordination in early childhood.

== Gamebooks ==
Gamebooks are much like traditional books but require the reader to make decisions throughout the book that affect the outcome of the story. At each decision point, the reader is instructed to go to a particular page and/or paragraph to continue the story. The first gamebook debuted in 1941. The format was especially popular in the 1980s.

== Hidden object and picture books ==
Hidden object picture books engage readers of all ages by camouflaging items with the intention of children eventually finding them. Whether the hidden object is a hard-to-spot character, or an item specified by the author in a rhyming list is subject to the book or possibly the series of books it belongs to. Although it is not standard, these types of interactive children's books are sometimes published with a common theme such as Christmas or life on the farm. Children can interactively experience a selective number of these books as early as age four and beginning at a pre-kindergarten grade level, depending on how easily the hidden objectives can be located. There are several notable authors and illustrators of hidden object picture books:

=== Martin Handford Where’s Wally? ===
British illustrator Martin Handford is credited with the conception of the Where's Wally? series. Despite the series christened title, his hidden picture books are more recognizable under the North American franchise's version of the character, Waldo. The purpose of Handford's hidden object picture books is for children of all ages to identify Wally in a specified location throughout his “world-wide hike.” Although various activities and outfit similarities easily camouflage the character's whereabouts, Wally always wears glasses and carries a walking stick and is famous for his outfit of a red and white horizontally striped shirt, blue trousers and a bobble hat.

The first book in Handford's series, originally titled Where's Wally?, was published in 1987. The book was soon followed by the release of Where's Wally Now? (1988) and Where's Wally?: The Fantastic Journey (1989). The books became extremely popular and were translated into many languages. The trademark of Wally was adopted in 28 countries and the character is often given a different name and personality in the translations.

As more books were released the cast of characters grew as well - including Wizard Whitebeard, Wilma, Wenda, Woof, Odlaw and the Waldo Watchers. More Waldo books followed - such as Where's Waldo in Hollywood?, Where's Waldo?: The Wonder Book (1997), Where's Waldo?: The Great Picture Hunt (2006).

Waldo became a huge pop culture sensation in the early 1990s. The United States, in particular, was swept with "Waldo-mania". Aside from the adaptations of Handford's books, the franchises grew to include licensing of Waldo for video games, spin-off books, magazines, dolls, toys, comics and a TV series.

Wally has his own website where he dispatches messages to fans and invites them to join in on the chase through different social networks.

=== Jean Marzollo and Walter Wick I Spy ===
I Spy is another interactive children's book series that can be categorized as a hidden object picture book. Debuting in 1992, the books consist of texts written by Jean Marzollo regarding items hidden within the photographs captured by Walter Wick.

Wick's photographs are set up in a cluttered assortment of items or to imitate a particular scene, like the toy shop window in I Spy: Christmas (1992). Below the picture, Marzollo involves readers with a riddle asking them to locate specific items within Wick's photograph. Wick's photographs are highly regarded for their expressive quality.

The series originated with I Spy: A Book of Picture Riddles (1992) and grew to include I Spy: Christmas (1992), I Spy: Fun House (1993), I Spy: Mystery (1993), I Spy: Fantasy (1994), I Spy: School Days (1995), I Spy: Spooky Night (1996), and I Spy: Treasure Hunt (1999).

A subsequent and more challenging series was begun in 1997 with I Spy: Super Challenger! (1997) and was continued with other installments such as I Spy: Gold Challenger! (1998), I Spy: Extreme Challenger! (2000), I Spy: Year-Round Challenger! (2001), and I Spy: Ultimate Challenger! (2003).

The I Spy label has grown to include video games based on the books such as I Spy Spooky Mansion, I Spy Treasure Hunt and I Spy Fantasy.

The franchise also includes Ultimate I Spy, an I Spy game for the Wii. I Spy: Fun House is being developed into a Nintendo DS game. The player is trapped in the actual funhouse and must find nine items to escape.

Walter Wick is also the author of his own hidden object series, similar to I Spy, called Can You See What I See?. These books feature photographs and poems that require readers to find objects in the picture. The puzzles are slightly easier than those of the I Spy books.

=== Other hidden object books ===
Martin Handford, Jean Marzollo and Walter Wick are not the only three authors of hidden object picture books. However, they are the most established and recognized in the publishing world. Another author worth mentioning is Gillian Doherty. She is a published author and editor of children's books. Her hidden object picture books include 1001 Monster Things to Spot, 1001 Things to Spot, and 1001 Wizard Things to Spot.

== Touch and feel books ==
In 1940, American writer Dorothy Kunhardt published Pat the Bunny, the first touch-and-feel book. It implores the reader to perform tactile texture-related tasks and imagine them in context, such as patting a cottontail, feeling stubble (sandpaper), and gazing into a mirror.

Many interactive books are made specifically for children. Touch-and-feel books, or texturized books, fall in this area. The prime age for touch-and-feel books is from toddler age to preschool. Because these books are aimed specifically at helping children develop knowledge while increasing the use of their senses, the appeal is lost to older generations who more than likely already possess the skills being taught. One of the key advantages to teaching senses and vocabulary through the use of touch and feel books is the connection a child can gain by instantly being rewarded with the texture that the word describes. In recent years, touch-and-feel books have gone to a new level with the creation of fun new ways for younger children to interact with books such as musical "bath books" and "finger puppet books". Most, but not all, of these books, are also "board books", which are made entirely out of hard pages. Making the pages out of a hard material provides for durability, allowing them to resist whatever they may contact along with the young readers. Bath books can be taken into the tub because of their floatable and waterproof pages. A few of the top touch-and-feel book publishers are Dorling Kindersley, Usborne, Macmillan, and Lamaze.

=== Examples of touch and feel books ===
- Pat the Bunny by Dorothy Kunhardt
- Usborne's " That's Not My..." series
- Dorling Kindersley's Touch and Feel series
- The Rainbow Fish, by Marcus Pfister
- Macmillan's Cloth Book Series by Roger Priddy
- "Little" Finger Puppet Book series. Chronicle Books and Imagebooks Staff. i.e. Little Puppy: Finger Puppet Book

== Pop-up books ==
Children's pop-up books are a form of interactive literature in which upon turning the page, an image literally “pops-up”. These books provide 3-D illustrations made of unfolding paper that allow for the child to feel as if the book is coming to life. First created in the mid-thirteenth century, they were originally not intended for children until publisher Robert Sayer created Harlquinade in 1765. With his creation of a “lift-the-flap” book, he gave children a way to truly become involved with what they are reading. From then, several other authors, such as William Grimaldi, designed their version of the pop-up book depicting elaborate scenes from page to page that allowed for the reader to determine the outcome of the story. The pop-up book has evolved from a seemingly simplistic idea to one of more sophistication, as well as complication. They have grown to be a genre that delights, intrigues, and educates children of all ages.

One key person in the pop-up book phenomenon is Waldo Hunt, who was the first to develop these books in the United States. He found joy and creativity in the idea of creating a pop-up image in a book. He was the true advocate and mastermind behind their conception and popularity.

There are several examples of these kinds of books, but some famous ones to check out are: Christmas in New York by Chuck Fischer, Star Wars: A Pop-Up Guide to the Galaxy by Matthew Reinhart, and The Amazing Pop-Up Geography Book by Kate Petty. Pop-up books can range from very simplistic 3-D illustrations to more intricate and detailed presentations depending upon the topic of the book, its author and illustrator, as well as the age of the audience they are appealing to.

It wasn't until the late nineteenth century, partly due to the invention of industrial printing, that pop-ups were created. The first pop-up books published in America were those in the Showman Series published by the McLoughlin Brothers. Still, these books were too expensive and fragile to be practical as children's books. Pop-ups opened the door for the creation of many other types of interactive books for both children and adults. Despite a brief decline in production during the mid-twentieth century, it was a new idea that spawned quickly and eventually became the highly technological and advanced world of books that it is today.

== Digitized learning books ==
Many children's interactive books have been enhanced through the use of technology. The earliest examples of this were books that had sound effects- a bar on the side of the book that had buttons corresponding with pictures in the story. When the icon appeared in the story, the reader could press a button on the side to hear the sound effect. These are called “sound books.” Books that had accompanying cassette tapes (or even CDs), usually known as books on tape, are another early example of this.

Once computers became more prevalent, CD-ROM versions of books became popular. These were programs that put books on the computer screen, enabling children to click their way through various words and pictures in the story and have it come alive. The technology was fairly limited, however, and not widespread as only children with access to a PC (and the knowledge to use it) could take advantage of it.

The next big step in this technology was Leap Frog's Leap Pad. The Leap Pad makes regular books interactive by enabling children to hear a word aloud, have the story read to them, have words and sounds spelled for them, play interactive learning games on many pages and more, simply by touching the included digital “pen” to different places on the page. The system is divided into “Leap Levels” for different-aged children and includes everything from picture books to chapter books, with separate Leap Pads corresponding to each level. There is also a unit that allows new content to be downloaded from Leap Frog's Web site. The technology of the Leap Pad continued evolving, and Leap Frog next came out with the Tag (LeapFrog). Instead of a Pad unit where books must be inserted, the Tag system is essentially a “pen” onto which books can be downloaded. Then, the pen can be scanned across the corresponding book to read it aloud, unlock activities and more. The goal for these products is to help children get more out of their books and learn to read, according to Leap Frog. Leap Frog even has its own publishing company, Leap Frog Press, which creates books specifically designed for its system. The products are not cheap, though- the Leap Pad can cost as much as $80. The Tag is usually sold in gift packs that run anywhere from $20 to $75. Books for each are sold separately and typically cost $12 or more.

Products like the Leap Pad or Tag system use technology to enhance the reading experience for children. Several companies have copied the idea and made similar products.

The newest advance in interactive children's books reflects the recent popularity of Amazon's Kindle. There are now a plethora of online and often free e-book sites that place children's picture books with sound effects and word pronunciations. These "virtual libraries" have done a lot to both preserve books and make them more available.

Older classic books are also moving online to keep up with the times.
