= Where's Wally? (TV series) =

- American title card
- Created by: Martin Handford
- Based on: Where's Wally? by Martin Handford
- Developed by: Rowby Goren
- Directed by: Stephan Martiniere (direct-to-video episodes)
- Creative director: Mike Gornall
- Starring: Townsend Coleman; Brad Garrett; Julian Holloway; Dave Workman
- Narrated by: Jim Cummings
- Composer: Michael Tavera
- Countries of origin: United States; United Kingdom
- Original language: English
- No. of episodes: 13 (and four specials)

Production
- Executive producers: Martin Handford; Andy Heyward (TV series); Peter Orton (TV series)
- Producers: Peter Aries (TV series); Michael Cornall (direct-to-video episodes)
- Editors: Richard S. Gannon; Trudy Alexander; Kris Glispin
- Running time: 25 minutes
- Production company: The Waldo Film Co. (Note: Known as The Where's Waldo Co. on the direct-to-video specials.)

Original release
- Network: CBS (CBS Kid TV) (United States); ITV (CITV) (United Kingdom)
- Release: September 14 – December 14, 1991

Where's Wally? (called Where's Waldo? in North America) is an animated television series production based on the Where's Wally? books by Martin Handford and aired on CBS in the United States and ITV in the United Kingdom for one season with a series of four episodes being released direct-to-video following afterwards. The series was produced by The Waldo Film Company, Handford's vanity label for the Where's Wally? property, with DIC Enterprises handling animation production (Note: Animation outsourced to Sei Young Animation for the TV series, and Wang Film Productions for the specials.) and HIT Communications handling worldwide distribution, although both companies were not involved with the later direct-to-video specials.

== Plot ==
The show follows the adventures of Wally/Waldo and his dog Woof, who were already established stars of the Where's Wally? picture book series. The cartoon Where's Waldo? went beyond the books' original concept, giving the characters depth and giving reasons for their adventures.

Wally/Waldo and his dog Woof travel to distant lands, solving mysteries and lending a helping hand wherever they could. With the help of his magic walking stick, Wally/Waldo could travel through space and time or travel to far off magical lands. Often sent by Wizard Whitebeard to help solve a puzzle, or mysteries, Where's Waldo? was a 1/2 hour puzzle of clues and riddles. The evil Waldo lookalike Odlaw was the show's villain, constantly plotting to steal Waldo's magic stick. In each episode Odlaw would team up with the other villains from the far-off lands to help get the magic stick, while Waldo and Woof teamed up with other land's "good-guys" to help with their problems. Waldo stayed true to the books' premise by means of the "Waldo's Minutes", during which the screen froze for a full minute so the viewer at home could try to find Wally. This kind of segment aired twice per episode.

== Characters ==
- Wally/Waldo (voiced by Townsend Coleman) is the star of the Where's Wally? series. The character is known for his distinct wardrobe of a red and white striped shirt, blue jeans, brown boots, red and white striped socks, glasses, and his red and white bobbled hat. He has traveled all over the world, through time, and to distant magical lands. Waldo is not the only one like him; he comes from the Land of Waldos, which is a land filled with Waldos just like him. Waldo is always ready for an adventure with his walking stick in hand, and trusty dog Woof by his side. His favorite hobbies are reading and collecting things from his many travels. The character's age is unknown and his height is described as "tallish" and weight as "lightish". Wally is very good-natured and has an optimistic attitude, often being seen with a smile on his face. Waldo first appeared in 1987 in the book Where's Wally?. Over the years Wally's appearance changed only slightly.
- Woof (voiced by David Workman) is Wally's dog and good friend. Woof originally belonged to Wilma, but over the years became Waldo's dog. Woof comes from the Land of Woofs, which is a land full of dogs like him. Like his owner, Woof sports a red and white bobbled hat, glasses, and a red and white striped suit. Woof sets off with Waldo on his travels with his bone, but always seems to lose it. Woof is shy and easily scared. He gets so scared at many of the places he travels to that he hides, leaving only his tail showing. In the classic Waldo books, only Woof's tail can be spotted. Woof first appeared in 1990 in Where's Wally?: The Ultimate Fun Book.
- Wizard Whitebeard (voiced by Brad Garrett impersonating Rodney Dangerfield) is the magical, fun-loving, humorous wizard who often visits Waldo with one of his many magical scrolls (something he always ends up losing). Wizard Whitebeard is recognizable by his long white beard, red robe, blue hat, bare feet, and carries a striped staff with him like Wally does with his walking stick. Whitebeard is the one with the magic that allows Waldo and his friends to travel to all the magical and far off lands. While there are rumors stating that he is the father of Wenda, these have not been confirmed and are not considered canon. Wizard Whitebeard first appeared in 1989 in the book Where's Wally? The Fantastic Journey.
- Odlaw (voiced by Julian Holloway) is the villain of the Where's Waldo? series. He is "mean, nasty, loathsome and disgusting". His number of good deeds are few and all he cares about is getting his hands on Waldo's magic walking stick. His wardrobe includes a black and yellow striped shirt, black jeans, boots, dark glasses, yellow and black bobbled hat, and a slick moustache. Odlaw seems to be something of an evil twin to Waldo, and it is later confirmed by the revelation that he comes from Odlaw's Swamp, where hundreds of other Odlaws live, which is a parallel to the Land of Waldos. Odlaw can be really clumsy, so he always ends up getting hurt. Odlaw's name comes from "Waldo" spelled backwards. He first appeared in 1991 in the book Where's Wally?: The Magnificent Poster Book! where his role was like an "Anti-Waldo".
- Wenda is Waldo's best friend. The character is the "one who takes the pictures" according to the intro of The Wonder Book, but she always loses her camera. Wenda was featured in the Where's Waldo? television series, in the episode "The Living Exhibits". She first appeared in 1991 in Where's Wally?: The Magnificent Poster Book! along with her twin sister, Wilma, who, however, has not been seen since. Wenda's wardrobes include a red and white striped shirt, blue skirt, red and white striped stockings, glasses, and red and white bobbled hat.

The series was narrated by Jim Cummings.

== Voice cast ==
- Townsend Coleman as Wally/Waldo
- David Workman as Woof
- Brad Garrett as Wizard Whitebeard
- Julian Holloway as Odlaw
- Jim Cummings as Narrator

=== Additional voices ===
- Joe Alaskey
- Jack Angel
- Jeff Bennett
- Gregg Berger
- Susan Blu
- Carol Channing
- Cam Clarke
- Brian Cummings
- Jennifer Darling
- Jeannie Elias
- Pat Fraley
- Maurice LaMarche
- Mary McDonald-Lewis
- Michael Mariana
- John Mariano
- Chuck McCann
- Pat Musick
- Alan Oppenheimer
- Rob Paulsen
- Jan Rabson
- Roger Rose
- Susan Silo
- Frank Welker

== Crew ==
- Susan Blu - voice and casting director
- Marsha Goodman - casting director
- Stephanie McCorkle - talent coordinator

== International changes ==
To meet the needs of international viewers in the United States and Canada, a second audio track was recorded using the same vocal actors – the name "Wally" was replaced entirely with "Waldo", the name of the books' character in the United States and Canada. Other international versions were produced dubbed in entirely in German, French, Spanish, Italian, Japanese and other languages (many times with Wally's name being changed to match that country's name from the original books).

== Episodes ==
=== TV series ===
No.	Title	Written by	Original release date
1	"My Left Fang"	Rowby Goren	September 14, 1991
Wizard Whitebeard sends Waldo and Woof on a quest in the land of the Nasty Nasties. There the two travelers meet Fang, a young and nerdy vampire who does not want to grow-up to become a mean and horrid vampire; instead he wants to be human. With Waldo's help, Fang searches for the magic scroll that can help him change who he is. Along the way they meet up with witches, vampires, ghosts, mummies, and Clyde (a four-armed prison guard). The evil and awful Odlaw tries to keep up with Waldo and grab the magic walking stick, but is thwarted (as usual) by a series of unfortunate events and calamities. Based on the picture "The Nasty Nasties" from Where's Waldo? 3: The Fantastic Journey (US title: The Great Waldo Search).
2	"Forest Women"	Rowby Goren	September 21, 1991
When Fred and his evil army start destroying the magic forest, Waldo and Woof are sent to the rescue. The two travelers are sent by Wizard Whitebeard to find a magic fruit that will help protect and restore the forest. With the aide of Queen Emeralda, the Green Ladies and the Mud Men, Waldo sets out to help restore nature from the grasp of the evil "bucket-heads". Meanwhile, Odlaw tries to impress the evil leader Fred and join his army in order to help him finally get Waldo, and his magic walking stick. Finally, the two sides collide in a climactic battle over the magical forest. In the end, Waldo and his forest friend prevail over the evil army and the woods are restored. The episode was based on the illustration "The Fighting Foresters" from The Great Waldo Search.
3	"It's a Gruel, Gruel World"	Evelyn A. R. Gabai, Bill Matheny	September 28, 1991
Chef Baker Cook, who cooks all the food in the land of the Gobbling Gluttons is tortured by a curse from the evil (and ugly) witch Porcina. Due to Porcina's spell, the people of the land are eternally hungry, and Chef Baker Cook has to keep feeding them all – day and night. Waldo and Woof are sent to help him stop the gluttons' hunger. As they try to break the curse they run into Elvis Parsley, the blue mushroom miners, and a slew of other wacky characters. Odlaw trails behind teaming up with the witch Porcina to stop Waldo in his task, and again attempting to get his hands on the magic walking stick, but Odlaw runs into trouble when he falls in love with Porcina. The episode was based on the illustration "The Gobbling Gluttons" from The Great Waldo Search.
4	"The Great Ball Game"	David Schwartz	October 5, 1991
King Fussifuss is in trouble when the crown trophy goes missing. Without the trophy the great ball players who populate the land will turn against him and his kingdom will be lost to his evil step-brother. Waldo and Woof are on the case. The two traveling companions follow a trail of riddles and clues to find the crown trophy. Waldo dodges ball-players, jumps down the giant ball pit, navigates the "maze of no return", meets monsters and weirdos, rides a balloon, and still manages to stays one step ahead of Odlaw. Waldo races to unravel the mystery before the final ball game finishes, and the players discover the trophy is gone. He even gets involved in the sports himself when he helps win the giant tie-breaking game for the missing trophy. The episode was based on the illustration "The Great Ball-Game Players" from The Great Waldo Search and the illustration "Oh, What A Lovely Maze" from The Ultimate Fun Book.
5	"Draining the Deep"	Bill Matheny, David Schwartz	October 19, 1991
In the Land of the Deep Sea Divers, the sea is draining, and Waldo is sent by the Wizard Whitebeard to help solve the problem. Waldo meets Lucinda, the mermaid who was in charge of guarding the great sea plug. On Lucinda's dismay, a ship full of plug-snatching pirates came and took the plug when she was not looking. Now Waldo, Woof and Lucinda have to try to get the plug back and the sea level restored. Meanwhile, Odlaw teams up with Pegbeard (the pirate captain who stole the plug), and the evil pirate octopus Sidney. The pirates are draining the sea to uncover the treasures that have sunken to the bottom, while Odlaw is after (as always) Waldo's magic stick. Waldo (and Woof) travel to the bottom of the sea, nearly avoid being eating by a shark, fight off pirates, meet mermaids (and mermen), and take a wild boat ride. Waldo must plug the sea and restore water to the land before it is too late. The episode was based on the illustration "The Deep-Sea Divers" from The Great Waldo Search and the illustrations "Being a Pirate" from Find Waldo Now, as well as "Pirate Panorama" from The Great Picture Hunt.
6	"The Underground Hunters"	Bill Matheny, David Schwartz	October 26, 1991
The Wizard Whitebeard has lost one of his scrolls and asks Waldo to go find it in the Land of the Underground Hunters. There Waldo meets Seymour McGuywholikestocatchdragonsson (the name says it all), a feared dragon hunter, who is fighting the dragons who plague the land and driving them deep into the caves. Seymour's son, Claxton McGuywhodoesntlikestocatchdragonsson, is appalled by this practice; he likes the dragons and is convinced that they mean the humans no harm. Waldo and Woof travel deep into the caves of the Land of the Underground hunters in search of the Wizard's scroll. Soon they meet Bernie, a small dragon, who follows them on their quest. Following Whitebeard's clues, the three travelers confront dragons, take a ride on a giant rock slide, and survive an avalanche. Seymour, and the other hunters, soon come to respect the dragons when Bernie saves Claxton's life. Life in the Land of the Underground Hunters will not be the same since the hunters learn that dragons are not mean, nasty, and all around icky. The episode was based on the illustration "The Underground Hunters" from The Great Waldo Search.
7	"The Unfriendly Giants"	Bill Matheny, David Schwartz	November 2, 1991
There are some little people with a big problem in the Land of the Unfriendly Giants. Wizard Whitebeard sends Waldo off to find three puzzling clues that will end the giants' reign of terror. Waldo and Woof set out to stop the unfriendly giants, led by J. Archibald Barrington III (or Archie for short). Waldo follows clues all over the village as he works to solve the Wizard's riddle, and in the end Waldo is able to teach the townsfolk to stand up for themselves. The episode erupts with a massive battle, when the little people strike back with their tricks and traps. Waldo finally solves the Wizard's riddle, and finds a way to stop the giants for good. The episode was based on the illustration "The Unfriendly Giants" from The Great Waldo Search.
8	"A Stone Age Story"	Bill Matheny, David Schwartz	November 9, 1991
Waldo is invited to a wild party at Wizard Whitebeard's cave, but once getting there, Waldo is more interested in the cave paintings found on the Wizard's walls; he soon decides to travel to a time he has never been before - the Stone Age. Waldo and Woof travel back in time and soon meet Sconk, a tribe leader, who shows Wally the tribe's latest project. The tribe is building a huge theater, but unlike other tribes, they have enlisted the work of animals to get the job done. As usual, trouble starts as soon as Odlaw shows up. Odlaw teams up with the scheming caveman Carn, and the two convince the animals to go on strike by stopping work until they get more respect. With the help of Waldo, Sconk attempts to restore peace between the animals and caveman and complete the theater. Waldo even runs into an old ancestor (and his dog Bark). Humans must come to an agreement with the bears, mammoths, mice, birds, dogs, and other creatures and complete the theater. The episode was based on the illustration "The Stone Age" from Find Waldo Now.
9	"The Land of the Carpet Flyers"	Julianne Klemm	November 16, 1991
When there is trouble in the Land of the Carpet Flyers, Wizard Whitebeard sends Waldo and Woof to help. The two travelers soon meet Rudniesh, a carpet weaver a problem. It is only a few hours until the big Rug-Burner 500 race. The winner of the Rug-Burner 500 gets to rub a lamp, and if a genie comes out of the lamp they are declared the king. Rudniesh was going to enter the race, but his plans for a special racing rug were stolen along with everyone else's rugs. With only hours to go until the race, all the other racers want Rudniesh to weave them replacement rugs but the large workload is unbearable. Everyone suspects that the mean Ali Blobi stole the carpets in order to win the race, so Waldo, Woof and Rudniesh follow the clues to uncover the mystery. Unable to retrieve the missing plans in time, Waldo lends his rug to Rudniesh to enter the race. After a long and heated race between Ali Blobi and Rudniesh, Blobi comes out victorious, yet when Ali Blobi rubs the lamp (and the genie) the wrong way, Rudniesh's luck turns around. The episode was based on the illustration "The Land of the Carpet Flyers" from The Great Waldo Search.
10	"The Living Exhibits"	Bill Matheny, David Schwartz	November 23, 1991
Wenda calls Waldo and Woof for help when Wizard Whitebeard gets stuck in the movie picture at Wenda's Theater. After helping the Wizard, Waldo learns of a problem in the Land of the Living Museum. Waldo invites Wenda along on their adventure. Waldo, Woof, and Wenda, with Odlaw trailing behind, head off to the museum. There they meet Okey Dokey, the museum's curator, who informs them that the art is being stolen. Soon they are introduced to resident artist Norwood Oou. The three travelers visit the ancient Rome section of the museum in search of clues and find themselves in the middle of a gladiator match. After a few close calls, Waldo learns that Emperor Nero's harp was stolen. They continue to follow the clues to the Egyptian exhibit. They learn that Cleopatra's golden pussy cat was stolen as well. There are a few more close calls as they explore the pyramids, while Wenda takes a lot more pictures. With all the clues and Wenda's pictures, Waldo solves the crime and saves the day. The episode was based on the illustration "Museum" from Where's Waldo?, the illustration "Fun and Games in Ancient Rome" from Find Waldo Now, the illustration "The Riddle of the Pyramids" from Find Waldo Now.
11	"Ahead of the Future"	George Atkins	November 30, 1991
Waldo is sent to Future Land by Wizard Whitebeard with a clue to the past. There he helps Robot 9 flee from Master Trasher to avoid being replaced for being obsolete. When the super UV solar flares hits Future Land Robot 9 is needed as the only functioning robot to save President Gomez's ship from crashing because of a fried robot pilot. The episode is based on the illustration "The Future" from Find Waldo Now.
12	"Viking Fling"	Rowby Goren	December 7, 1991
Waldo and Woof accompany Miss Pixie to the Land of the Vikings to retrieve the Magical Musical Golden Horn so that she can become a full fledged wizard. Along the way Waldo helps repel the Vikings from the village of Glurb, encounter a purple polka dotted pot bellied sea serpent, meet the Viking Queen Broonhilda, and sail off the edge of the world. The episode is based on the illustration "On Tour with the Vikings" from Find Waldo Now.
13	"The Land of the Lost Pyramid"	George Atkins	December 14, 1991
Waldo and Woof travel to the Land of the Lost Pyramid. Waldo finds himself battling his wits against Guanomuck – the most rotten, cruel (and often naughty) villain listed in the "Who's Who" of Aztec bad guys. The episode is based on the illustration "The Last Days of the Aztecs" from Find Waldo Now.

=== Direct-to-video episodes (1992) ===
Following the conclusion of the TV series, a series of four direct-to-video specials were created that took advantage of the VCR technology. The entire voice cast, except for Julian Holloway as Odlaw, was replaced for these episodes. The first two releases were released in 1992 by GoodTimes Home Video, while the other two didn't see the light of day until July 1997, when they were released by 20th Century Fox Home Entertainment through the Fox Kids Video imprint.

No.	Title	Written by	Original release date
1	"The Meanie Genie of Aladdin's Lamp"	Betty G. Birney	June 2, 1992
Waldo and Woof set off to stop an evil genie before he takes over Lampsmania.
2	"The Merry X-Mas Mix-Up!"	Betty G. Birney	November 20, 1992
Waldo, Woof and Wenda must help out unsolving Santa Claus' scrambled list or Christmas won't happen.
3	"Around the World in a Daze"	Unknown	July 29, 1997
Waldo, Woof and Wenda help an explorer with his trip around the world.
4	"The Birthday Blow-Out"	Unknown	July 29, 1997
Waldo and Woof track down the missing cake recipe in Birthday Land.

== Home media ==
=== Home media ===
In the United States, episodes were released on videocassette in the 1990s by 20th Century Fox Home Entertainment, Fox Kids Video, and CBS Video.

The animated show was released in Australia on May 7, 2009, with Where's Wally? Vol. 1 – My Left Fang.

=== UK VHS releases ===
- Abbey Home Entertainment (Tempo Video) (1992–1994)

VHS title	VHS catalogue number	Release date	Episodes
Where's Wally? My Left Fang	96022	1992	"My Left Fang", "Forest Women", "The Great Ball Game"
Where's Wally? It's a Gruel, Gruel World	96242	1993	"It's A Gruel, Gruel World", "Draining The Deep", "The Underground Hunters"
Where's Wally? The Land of the Carpet Flyers	96332	1993	"The Land of the Carpet Flyers"
Where's Wally? The Land of the Lost Pyramid	96392	1994	"The Land Of The Lost Pyramid", "Ahead Of The Future", "The Unfriendly Giant"
Where's Wally? The Biggest Ever Video	97242	1994	"A Stone Age Story", "Viking Fling", "The Living Exhibits", "It's A Gruel, Gruel World", "Draining The Deep", "The Underground Hunters", "My Left Fang", "Forest Women", "The Great Ball Game"
Where's Wally? The Unfriendly Giant	97492	1994	"The Unfriendly Giant", "The Land Of The Lost Pyramid"
Where's Wally? The Land of the Carpet Flyers	978027	1994	"The Land of the Carpet Flyers", "A Stone Age Story", "Viking Fling", "The Living Exhibits"

== Awards ==
The Where's Wally? cartoon was nominated for the "1992 annual Young Artist Award" for Outstanding New Animation Series but lost the award to Back to the Future: The Animated Series (also on CBS). The show lasted only one season on CBS airing 13 episodes between September 14 and December 14, 1991, before being cancelled because of low ratings (as a result of direct competition from NBC's juggernaut Saved by the Bell and ABC's The Bugs Bunny and Tweety Show). Reruns of the episodes aired on CBS until September 5, 1992.

== Merchandise ==
In 1992, Little, Brown and Company released two Waldo books based on the adventures and characters from the Where's Waldo? TV Show. Fun with Waldo and More Fun with Waldo, featured print versions of many of the "Waldo Minute" freeze-frame scenes, along with new puzzles and things to spot in each picture.

== Reboot ==
A reboot entitled Where's Waldo?, produced by DreamWorks Animation Television, premiered on Universal Kids in July 2019.
