= Where's Waldo? (video game) =

1991 video game

- Cover art
- Developer: Bethesda Softworks
- Publisher: THQ
- Designers: Paul Coletta; Randy Linden
- Composer: Julian LeFay
- Platform: Nintendo Entertainment System
- Release: July 1991
- Genre: Hidden object game
- Mode: Single-player

Where's Waldo? is a hidden object game developed by Bethesda Softworks and published by THQ for the Nintendo Entertainment System in 1991. It was the first video game loosely based on Martin Handford's 1987 book of the same name. Mostly similar to the books, players must help Waldo get to the Moon by finding him in each of the eight levels in the game.

The game was panned by critics, who criticized the game for its graphics, which made it more difficult to find Waldo in each of the levels.

== Gameplay ==
The city level in Where's Waldo?

The player searches for Waldo in locations including a train station, forest, fairground, city, and castle, locating him among large crowds before time runs out. Additional stages include guiding Waldo through a dark cave by keeping a flashlight lit and leading him to the exit, navigating a maze of subway tracks to recover Waldo's glasses while avoiding White Beard's attempts to reduce the remaining time, and operating a slot machine in the Moon Match-Up level to align three images of Waldo and send him on a trip to the moon.

== Development ==
Where's Waldo was programmed and designed by two Bethesda Softworks staff, Paul Coletta and Randy Linden, with the visuals done by Nancy Freeman. In an attempt to ease-up programming graphics using only character sets, Linden programmed a tool to draw bitmap graphics that would be converted into character sets that would be randomized every time the game was loaded up.

== Reception ==
Reception

Review scores
Publication	Score
Game Informer	1/10
Just Games Retro	0.5/5
Nintendo Power	2.43/5 (Note: Nintendo Power rated Where's Waldo 1.9/5 for graphics/sound, 3.2/5 for play control, 1.8/5 for control, and 2.8/5 for theme/fun.)
Nintendo World Report	1.5/10
VideoGame	6.5/10 (Note: VideoGame, a Brazilian magazine, scored Where's Waldo 5/10 for difficulty, 6/10 for graphics, 7/10 for gameplay, and 8/10 for music.)
Yahoo Voices	0.5/5

Responses towards the game from reviewers were negative. One of the most known criticisms of the game is the graphics; some of the pixelated objects in each of the game's levels had similar colors and stripes of Waldo's shirt and in some levels Waldo would even change color, which made it hard to find him. Cracked.com wrote that Where's Waldo has the worst graphics of any NES game. Nintendo World Report, in addition to calling the graphics "boring", criticized its short game length and absence of music in the stages, negatively labeling it as nothing more than a pixel art collection.

ConsoleClassix.com said that, although fans of the book may enjoy the game a little, other players may get bored. In an issue of Game Informer, they have rated it a 1 out of 10, citing it as being "a game for those too lazy to turn a page". A reviewer of Yahoo Voices, who gave the game 0.5 out of 5 stars, even criticized the sound effects.

In 1992, Los Angeles Times wrote that Where's Waldo was one of "several hit games" published by THQ.

== Sequel ==
One year later, a sequel, The Great Waldo Search, was released on the Nintendo Entertainment System, Super Nintendo Entertainment System and Sega Genesis. It was based on Where's Wally? The Fantastic Journey, the third book of the Where's Wally? series. In 2009, a more modern remake of that sequel was developed by Ludia and published by Ubisoft on iOS, Microsoft Windows, Wii and the Nintendo DS. The remake especially takes advantage of superior pointer-based motion controls to easily locate search targets and supports versus multiplayer.
