= Where's Wally? The Incredible Paper Chase =

Book by Martin Handford

Where's Wally?: The Incredible Paper Chase
- Author: Martin Handford
- Illustrator: Martin Handford
- Language: English
- Subject: Where's Wally?
- Publisher: Walker Books (UK); Candlewick Press (US)
- Publication date: 1 August 2009
- Publication place: United Kingdom
- Media type: Print (hardback)
- Pages: 26
- ISBN: 978-1-4063-2446-4

Where's Wally?: The Incredible Paper Chase (called Where's Waldo?: The Incredible Paper Chase in North America) is the seventh book in the Where's Wally? series, released in 2009. It features Wally, Woof, Wenda, Wizard Whitebeard, and Odlaw travelling through different scenes.

The player's goal is to find Wally's key, Woof's bone, Wenda's camera, Wizard Whitebeard's scroll, Odlaw's binoculars, and a missing piece of paper in each scene. As in Where's Wally? The Great Picture Hunt!, there are other challenges like "spot-the-differences" scenes. Some of the characters and scenes appeared in one of the earlier Where's Wally? spin-off books.

The book was originally released as a hardcover version without the numbering system continuing with a "7" on the front cover, printed instead in the top left corner of the back. The paperback edition returns it to the front.

== Scenes ==
1. Castle Siege
2. The Jurassic Games
3. Picture This
4. The Great Retreat
5. Muddy Swampy Jungle Game
6. What a Dog Fight!
7. The Beat of the Drums
8. The Great Escape
9. The Enormous Party
10. Where's Wally? The Incredible Paper Chase Checklist (Note: Where's Wally? The Incredible Paper Chase Checklist is a checklist listing things to find in the illustrations and is not a scene.)
11. The Wacky Wally Circus Show
