= Where's Wally?: The Magnificent Poster Book! =

Poster Book by Martin Handford

- Author: Martin Handford
- Illustrator: Martin Handford
- Language: English
- Subject: Where's Wally?
- Publisher: UK: Walker Books; US: Little Brown & Co, then Candlewick Press
- Publication date: 21 November 1991
- Publication place: United Kingdom
- Pages: 26
- ISBN: 0-316-34352-8
- OCLC: 26565289

Where's Wally?/Waldo: The Magnificent Poster Book! is a Where's Wally? poster book released in 1991. The book introduces Wenda and Odlaw. Characters to spot include Wally, Woof, Wilma, Wenda, Wizard Whitebeard, Odlaw, and the Wally Watchers. The book included large one-sided posters of Wally scenes. Of the 11 scenes, five were from past Wally books and 6 were all-new (although three of them would later be published in Where's Wally? The Great Picture Hunt!).

The book marks the second and last time Wilma was seen.

In 2010, another large poster book was published titled The Spectacular Poster Book.

== Scenes ==
1. The Monstrous Monsters
2. The Castle Siege
3. On the Beach
4. Military Parade
5. The Nasty Nasties
6. Land of Sports
7. Unfriendly Giants
8. Among the Pirates
9. The Future
10. The Land of Wallies
11. The Old Friends
