= Activity book =

Book for writing in or working with

Example of an activity book

An activity book is a type of book, generally aimed at children, which contains interactive content such as games, puzzles, quizzes, pictures to colour and other elements that involve writing or drawing in the book itself. The book may, or may not, have a loose narrative or contain other non-interactive elements structured around the interactive elements. Activity books may be made for entertainment, education or a mixture of both.

In recent years, activity books for adults have become popular, as not only do they provide entertainment, but they support with mental health and brain activity.

Recent studies have proven that activity books for adults support with relaxation and stress relief in both adults and children.

Specific types of activity books include coloring books and puzzle books. A book is normally referred to as an activity book if it combines a variety of interactive elements and does not fall neatly into one of these more specific categories.

Similarly, adult activity books could include colouring pages (colour by number or free colouring) and puzzles such as sudoku and crossword puzzles, suitable for different ages and abilities.

== Examples ==
Activity books are typically centred around a particular theme. This may be a generic theme, e.g. dinosaurs, or based on a toy, television show, book, or game.

For example, the Where's Wally? series of books (known as Where's Waldo? in the USA) by Martin Handford consists of both puzzle books, wherein the reader must search for characters hidden in pictures, and activity books such as Where's Wally?: The Ultimate Fun Book, which include a wider range of games and activities as well as puzzles. In 2018, Nintendo announced its intention to publish activity books based on its trademarked characters and games.
