= Where's Wally in Hollywood? =

Book by Martin Handford

- American cover
- Author: Martin Handford
- Illustrator: Martin Handford
- Language: English
- Subject: Where's Wally?
- Publisher: UK: Walker Books; US: Little Brown & Co, then Candlewick Press
- Publication date: 18 November 1993
- Publication place: United Kingdom
- Media type: Print (hardback)
- Pages: 26
- ISBN: 1-56402-044-4
- OCLC: 28547984
- LC Class: PZ7.H1918 Whb 1993

Where's Wally in Hollywood? was released in 1993. In the book Wally, Wizard Whitebeard, Wenda, Woof, and Odlaw travel to movie and film sets in Hollywood. The book was re-released as a "Special Edition" version in 1997, moving Wally in each scene.

It is the fourth book in the Where's Wally? series.

== Scenes ==
1. A Dream Come True
2. Shhh! This is a Silent Movie
3. Horseplay in Troy
4. Fun in the Foreign Legion
5. A Tremendous Song and Dance
6. Ali Baba and the Forty Thieves
7. The Wild, Wild West
8. The Swashbuckling Musketeers
9. Dinosaurs, Spacemen, and Ghouls
10. Robin Hood's Merry Mess-up
11. When the Stars Come Out
12. Where's Wally? The Musical
