= Where's Wally?: The Ultimate Fun Book =

Book by Martin Handford

- American cover
- Author: Martin Handford
- Illustrator: Martin Handford
- Language: English
- Subject: Where's Wally?
- Publisher: UK: Walker Books; US: Little Brown & Co, then Candlewick Press
- Publication date: 24 November 1990
- Publication place: United Kingdom
- Media type: Paperback
- Pages: 26
- ISBN: 0-316-34344-7
- OCLC: 22942149

Where's Wally?: The Ultimate Fun Book (Where's Waldo?: The Ultimate Fun Book in America) is a Where's Wally? activity book by Martin Handford released in 1990. The book introduces Wilma, her dog Woof, and the Wally Watchers.

Unlike the previous three Where's Wally? books (Where's Wally?, Where's Wally Now?, and Where's Wally? The Fantastic Journey), this book featured various puzzles and games rather than the traditional detailed crowd scenes. The other kinds of additional puzzles included spot-the-differences, coloring pages, and a board game. The book was also a smaller paperback book that included stickers and press-outs.

== Scenes ==
- A Message from a Megastar
- A Great Moment of Romance
- The Muddy Swamp Jungle Game
- The Wonderful Portrait Puzzle
- Circus Punch-out Pages
- Sticker Pages
- The Sharp-Eyes Silhouette Game
- Old Friends
- Ding-Dong! What a Dog Fight
- The Beat of the Drums
- Oh, What a Lovely Maze!
- The Fun Goes on, and on and on and on...

== Series notes ==
This book introduced the characters Wilma, Woof, and The Wally-Watchers - there were 99 of the latter, although subsequent books would only feature 25. It was also the first book to feature Wally's Key.
