= Elope, Inc. =

American costumes and accessories company

elope Inc.
- Type: Private
- Founded: April 20, 1993; 33 years ago
- Founders: Kevin Johnson; Keith Johnson; Franzi Fu
- Headquarters: 10035 Federal Drive, Colorado Springs, Colorado, United States of America
- Area served: Worldwide
- Number of employees: 45
- Website: elope.com

elope, Inc. is an American company headquartered in Colorado Springs, Colorado, that designs, manufactures, and distributes costumes and accessories. The name is an acronym for "Everybody is Laughing on Planet Earth", a phrase they trademarked in November 2013. As of 2016, the company's headquarters is staffed by 45 employees, with an additional 325 factory employees in Guangzhou, China.

== History ==
=== Founding ===
Kevin Johnson, Keith Johnson, and Franzi Fu founded elope in 1993 after backpacking through Nepal, Thailand, Taiwan, India, Japan, China, and Indonesia. To offset travel costs, they sold products they purchased during their trips at a rented kiosk in The Citadel Mall, where they sold 1,000 hats within two weeks.

They contracted a Nepali factory shortly thereafter to manufacture their hats, the first of which were Mad Hatter, jester, and stovepipe hats marketed towards skiers and snowboarders. In 1995, following a year of little snowfall and poor sales, elope brought products to their first trade show and began expanding into the Halloween industry. The company was officially incorporated the same year.

=== Locations ===
elope rented its first non-residential headquarters, a 2,800 square foot warehouse, in 1999. Two years later, the company purchased its first building, an 18,000 square foot office space, and moved their headquarters there. According to the Colorado Springs Business Journal, a 300% growth rate in 2003 meant "expansion was imminent," and 2004 saw the purchase of a larger, 55,000 square foot building. Their current headquarters were purchased on October 10, 2012.

== Manufacturing ==
In an interview with Rocky Mountain News, CEO Kevin Johnson described elope's international business model as fair trade. Currently, the corporation conducts the bulk of their manufacturing through their factory partner in Guangzhou, China, a partnership that began following quality control issues with their previous Nepali manufacturer. Construction of the 125,000 square-foot Guangzhou factory began in 2003, as a joint effort between elope and Zhan Gong. A Feng shui expert was consulted throughout the entire process.

elope estimated a $1 million loss following the West Coast Port-Labor Dispute of 2002. In 2012, The company was contacted by Anthony E. Held, PhD, and given a 60-day Notice of Violation pursuant to Proposition 65 with allegations that they had sold Halloween costumes and accessories containing DEHP, DBP, BBP, arsenic, cadmium, and lead in California without the appropriate hazard warning labels. They agreed to not sell any product in the State of California unless they met reformulation standards outlined in the settlement.

== Products ==
elope has licenses from popular brands including Disney, Doctor Who, Dr. Seuss, Hasbro, Harry Potter, and Where's Waldo. In 2016, the company announced "Bricky Blocks", accessories that could be customized with LEGOs or other brick-building systems.

== Partnerships ==
=== Waldo Waldo 5K ===
The Waldo Waldo 5K was founded by Chelise Foster, an elope employee, following the Waldo Canyon Fire. As presenting sponsor, elope provides Waldo and Wenda costumes at discounted rates, in addition to monetary and staffing support. Raised funds go towards "Waldo Canyon restoration, disaster relief, fire recovery, outdoor activities and trails and open space maintenance in the local community."

=== St. Baldrick's Foundation ===
In 2001, elope partnered with the St. Baldrick's Foundation to host a shaving event in Colorado Springs, Colorado, and has been hosting annual events since. As of 2016, Fox 21 News claims the company has donated 20,000 hats, and raised over $1.2 million for pediatric cancer research.
