= Kalvitis =

Kalvitis is a surname. Notable people with the surname include:

- Aigars Kalvītis (born 1966), Latvian businessman and politician
- David Kalvitis, American artist and graphic designer
