= Jennie Maizels =

British illustrator and author

- Born: 1970 (age 55–56); London, U.K.
- Education: Central Saint Martins
- Website: jenniemaizels.com

Jennie Maizels (born 1970) is a British artist, illustrator, and educator. She worked on pop-up books with Kate Petty. She has also authored her own books.

== Early life and education ==
Maizels was born in London in 1970. She attended Northfields School For Girls, and then studied from 1990 to 1993 at Central Saint Martins School of Art, from which she graduated with a bachelor's degree in graphic design.

== Work and career ==
After graduation she worked for Harvey Nichols, The Body Shop and Dillons bookshop making window displays. She also began collaborating with the children's book author Kate Perry, illustrating Perry's The Great Grammar Book in 1996. Maizels and Perry worked together for 16 years, "producing eight children's books which sold over a million copies worldwide."

The producers of the film Paddington 2 approached her to discuss the creation of a pop-up book to feature in the film. After she worked on samples with a paper engineer Studio Canal chose not to proceed, but in 2018, with the support of her publisher Walker Books, Maizels alleged that some of her designs were used onscreen.

She hosts Sketchbook Club classes in person and online, and has also hosted art courses for cancer patients.

She lives and works in Braishfield, Hampshire.

== Books ==
=== As Author ===
- Finger Food for Babies & Toddlers. Vermillion. 2003. ISBN 9780091889517.
- Maizels, Jenny (2004). The things to do book. Candlewick Press. ISBN 978-0-7636-3371-4. OCLC 122939963.
- Maizels, Jennie (2012). Pop-up London: full of flaps, facts and dramatic pop-ups (1st ed.). Somerville, Mass: Candlewick Press. ISBN 978-0-7636-5787-1.
- Maizels, Jennie; Ferguson, Richard (2014). Pop-up New York. London, Boston, Sydney: Walker Books. ISBN 978-1-4063-4945-0.
- Pop-Up Shakespeare
- Party in Jigsaw Forest
- Rocket to Jigsaw Planet
- Journey to Jigsaw Town
- Picnic at Jigsaw Farm

=== As Illustrator ===
- The Great Grammar Book by Kate Petty (1996)
- The Amazing Pop-up Geography Book
- The Perfect Punctuation Pop-up Book
- The Super Science Book
- The Terrific Times Tables
- Earthly Treasures
- The Amazing Pop-Up Music Book
- The Global Garden
