= James Cartmell (actor) =

English actor

- Occupation: Actor
- Years active: 2016–present
- Television: Where's Wally?; Go, Dog. Go!; Doctors
- Website: jamescartmell.com

James Cartmell is an English actor. After his role in the West End theatre production of Milked, Cartmell became the voice of the titular character in British Where's Waldo television series. He also voices Gilber Barker in the 2021 Netflix series Go, Dog. Go!.

== Early life ==
James was born in Lancashire, England. He began acting and voice lessons in 2007. He attended Kirkham Grammar School, a private school located in Lancashire. In his early years at school, he was involved in music and sports and competed in athletics at a competitive level with UK Athletics. Cartmell then joined his local theatre school, Lytham Academy of Theatre Arts (LATA), and appeared in the school's production of Oliver! in 2017.

== Career ==
Cartmell made his first West End theatre appearance in the production of Milked by Simon Longman at the Arts Theatre in London. Shortly after, Cartmell played the role of the Mind in Borderline Electra, written by Stevie Helps, in Manchester at the Lowry. In late 2019, he was cast in the voice role of Wally in the DreamWorks Animation Television series Where's Wally.

On 18 December 2020, it was announced he would be voicing Gilber in the Netflix original series Go, Dog. Go!. In November 2021, he had a guest star role in the BBC medical soap opera Doctors as Jack Turner. On 6 September 2023, Cartmell reappeared in Doctors, this time in the role of Henry Povall.

== Filmography ==
| Year | Title | Role | Notes |
|---|---|---|---|
| 2019–2021 | Where's Wally? | Wally | Main voice role |
| 2021–present | Go, Dog. Go! | Gilber Barker | Main voice role |
| 2021 | Doctors | Jack Turner | Episode: "The Burden of Debt" |
| 2023 | Doctors | Henry Povall | Episode: "Henry" |

== Stage ==
| Year | Title | Role | Venue | Location |
|---|---|---|---|---|
| 2017 | Milked | Presenter | Arts Theatre | West End |
| 2018 | Borderline Electra | The Mind | The Lowry | Manchester |
