= Books That Grow =

- Website type: Online education, Interactive children's books, Digital library, Startup company
- Website: booksthatgrow.com
- Registration: Subscription

Books That Grow is an online educational platform headquartered in New York City that offers digital books designed to adapt to readers' abilities. Using a learning management system, two people reading the same title may see entirely different words, sequences of ideas, or illustrations, depending upon their individual learning profile. The application focuses specifically on the needs of pre-teens, adolescents, and adults with low literacy.

== History ==
Books That Grow was founded by Daniel Fountenberry, a former teacher and news executive, in 2012. The project was first known as Borne Digital and was publicly launched on February 14, 2013, at the Tools for Change in Publishing Conference Other co-founders include Jason Buhle, a cognitive neuroscientist. A Kickstarter campaign was launched in January 2014 to accelerate funding for Books that Grow.

== Reception ==
=== Awards ===
Books That Grow was named 'Most Innovative Start Up' by the members of the International Society for Technology in Education in 2017 and received the 2014 Verizon Powerful Answers Award in Education as well as the 2014 National School Board Association's Innovation Showcase.

=== Reviews ===
On February 11, 2014, EdTech Digest featured Books That Grow in "Cool Tools", stating: "It's already making somewhat of a splash in the publishing world and is now just setting up to make its way into classrooms across the country." The article specifically noted Books That Grow's progress on Kickstarter and coverage on MSNBC and CNN.

== See also ==
- Crowdfunding
- Literacy
