= Little White Lies (magazine) =

British movie magazine

- June–July 2017 "Dunkirk" issue
- Editor: David Jenkins
- Categories: Film
- Frequency: Bi-monthly
- Publisher: TCOLondon
- Founded: 2005
- Country: United Kingdom
- Based in: London
- Language: English
- Website: lwlies.com
- ISSN: 1745-9168 (print); 2516-0559 (web)
- OCLC: 1101713234

Little White Lies is a British internationally distributed movie magazine and website. It is published by London-based media company TCOLondon, who also publish the DIY culture magazine Huck.

== History and content ==
Little White Lies rose out of the ashes of Adrenalin, an adventure sports and lifestyle magazine. When Adrenalin's publisher went bankrupt, a group of friends working there decided to turn designer Danny Miller's student degree project "Little White Lies: Issue Zero" into a full-fledged magazine.

The design of each issue is inspired by its feature film, often represented on the cover by an illustration of its lead actor. The cover film also influences interior aspects, such as editorial icons, chapter headings and custom typefaces. However, the overall template of the magazine remains the same. It was called "the best-designed film magazine on the shelf" in The Guardian. Its content is split into three acts: the lead review, a series of feature articles inspired by the cover film, and the reviews section, which also includes interviews with directors and stars of upcoming movies. The magazine uses a three part ranking system. The categories ("'Anticipation", "Enjoyment", and "In Retrospect") are marked out of five and accompanied by explanatory text.

== Books ==
The first Little White Lies book, What I Love About Movies (ISBN 978-0571312085), was published by Faber and Faber in 2014. The book is a collection of responses from directors such as Quentin Tarantino and Francis Ford Coppola and actors including Ryan Gosling, Kristen Stewart, and Helen Mirren to the magazine's signature question: What do you love about movies?

Little White Lies has since published other books such as Making Your Own Movie in 39 Steps and Where's the Dude?: The Great Movie Spotting Challenge. The former is a step-by-step guide to filmmaking while the latter is a Where's Wally?-inspired book where the reader is tasked with finding a character from The Big Lebowski.

== Website ==
Little White Lies also maintains a website that publishes movie reviews, features articles, and a podcast. Like its magazine, movie reviews are rated in three parts: "Anticipation", "Enjoyment", and "In Retrospect".

The website has an online store selling books and board games.

== Podcast ==
In April 2017, Little White Lies started a podcast titled Truth & Movies, named after the publication's motto. The podcast is co-hosted by various members of the magazine's staff and they converse about new movie releases and their opinions of those movies.
