= Where's Wally? =

English series of children's puzzle books

- A self-drawing of Martin Handford with (left to right) Wizard Whitebeard, Woof, Odlaw, Wenda, and Wally.
- List of titles
- Author: Martin Handford
- Country: United Kingdom
- Language: English
- Genre: Children's literature, puzzle
- Publisher: UK: Walker Books; US: Little Brown & Co then Candlewick Press
- Published: Since 1987
- Media type: Print (hardback and paperback)

Where's Wally? (called Where's Waldo? in North America) is a series of children's puzzle books created by the English illustrator Martin Handford, first published on 25 June 1987. The books consist of a series of detailed double-page spread illustrations each depicting hundreds of people doing a variety of amusing things at a location. Readers are challenged to find a character named Wally and his friends hidden throughout the pages.

Wally is identified by his red-and-white-striped shirt, bobble hat, and glasses, but many illustrations contain red herrings involving deceptive use of red-and-white striped objects. Later entries in the long-running book series added other targets for readers to find in each illustration. The books have also inspired two television programmes (the 1991 Where's Wally? animated series and the 2019 Where's Waldo? animated series), a comic strip and a series of video games.

As of 2007, more than 73 million Where's Wally? books had been sold around the world since the debut of the series in 1987. The series has been translated into 26 languages and is published in over 50 countries.

== History ==
In 1986, illustrator Martin Handford, a graduate of the University for the Creative Arts in Kent, was asked by art director David Bennett, at Walker Books in London, to develop a book of detailed crowd scenes. Bennett was inspired by the book series Busy Places by Philippe Dupasquier. While the book was being prepared for Bologna Children's Book Fair, someone at Walker Books suggested Handford hide a distinctive-looking character in crowd scenes for readers to search for. Handford came up with the idea of "Wally", a world and time traveller dressed in red and white stripes.

The first Where's Wally? book was published on 25 June 1987. First published in the United Kingdom by Walker Books, the series was introduced in the United States under the title Where's Waldo? because an executive at the book's initial American publisher, Little, Brown and Company, disliked the name "Wally" because it reminded him of Wallis Simpson. American publishing rights were later taken on by Candlewick Press, the American subsidiary of Walker Books.

The books became extremely popular internationally and the character name was localised in a variety of regions, where Wally was known as Walter in Germany, Charlie in France, Van Lang in Vietnam, Jonas in Lithuania, and Ubaldo in Italy, among others. The franchise also spawned other media in a more storyline-based form, including a 1991 television series, Where's Wally?, a comic strip Where's Wally? and a series of video games. In the early 1990s, a topless beachgoer in a Where's Waldo puzzle caused controversy in the US and caused BJ's Wholesale Club and certain school libraries to pull the book from shelves, leading to its appearance in the American Library Association's list of the 100 most frequently challenged books of the 1990s.

Handford continued to publish books in the series, and sometimes it took him up to eight weeks to draw two-page illustrations of the elusive "Wally" and the many characters surrounding him. He made Wally progressively harder to find by reducing his size on the page and surrounding him by more characters. In the first book, Wally was on average 0.99 square centimetres (0.153 square inches) big. This was reduced to 0.80 cm^{2} (0.124 sq in) in the second book, 0.33 cm^{2} (0.051 sq in) in the third, and between 0.20 and 0.17 cm^{2} (0.031 and 0.026 sq in) in the fourth through seventh books. He has also been surrounded by more characters, from 225 on the first book's first page to about 850 on the last book's first page.

In January 2007, Entertainment Rights purchased the Where's Wally? franchise. On 1 April 2009, Entertainment Rights went into voluntary administration. On the same day, Boomerang Media acquired all of Entertainment Rights' subsidiaries including Entertainment Rights itself, Big Idea and Classic Media. The following month, Boomerang Media began preparations to unify former British and US subsidiaries of Entertainment Rights under the name "Classic Media", while Big Idea would operate under its own name. The Entertainment Rights PLC company was folded in December 2010. In 2012, Classic Media was acquired by DreamWorks Animation. DreamWorks Animation was then acquired by NBCUniversal in 2016, thus Universal Pictures gaining the rights to most of Entertainment Rights' catalogue of works.

== Characters ==
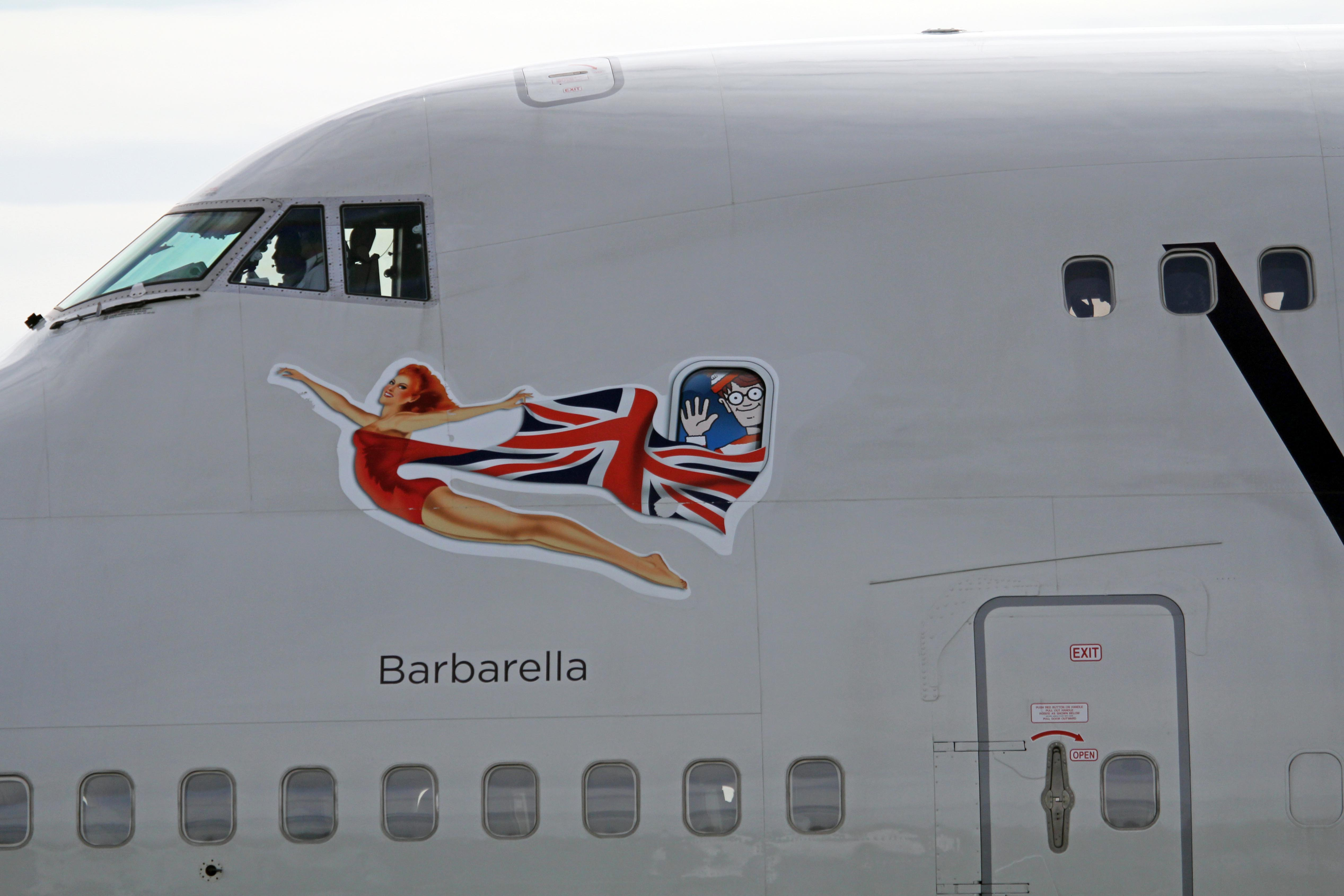
Wally graphic appearing on a Virgin Atlantic airliner

- Wally, whose name was localised for certain international editions, for example Waldo in the North American and Swedish editions. Over time, more characters were added to find in each scene.
- Wilma, Wally's girlfriend who first appeared in the Ultimate Fun Book, and was replaced by her identical twin sister Wenda after they appeared together in Where's Wally: The Magnificent Poster Book.
- Wenda, a friend of Wally who replaced her twin sister Wilma for In Hollywood (although she previously appeared alongside Wilma in The Magnificent Poster Book).
- Odlaw, Wally's arch-enemy, who made his print debut in The Magnificent Poster Book. He appears nearly the same as Wally, except that his clothes are yellow and black striped instead of red and white, his glasses have a blue tint to them, and he has a moustache. He also has an English accent in the television series. Although it is told that "his bad deeds are many", he is not depicted in the books doing anything particularly nasty, but in the television series, he is frequently seen to be attempting to steal Wally's magical walking stick. His name "Odlaw" is simply a reversal of "Waldo" from the American editions, although he is still called "Odlaw" in the United Kingdom as well.
- Woof, Wally's dog, first appeared in The Ultimate Fun Book, where he was identified as Wenda's dog. Only his tail can be found, with the exception of the final page of Where's Wally: The Wonder Book, which depicts all of Woof, and the six activity books released between 1993 and 1995, starting with The Truly Terrific Activity Book, where Woof shows himself to the reader. In the 2019 TV series, Woof returns in the episode "A Wanderer's Christmas" and the second season.
- Arfolomew, a grey dog who could be a miniature schnauzer and also known as Arf for short in the 2019 animated series.
- Wizard Whitebeard, first seen in The Fantastic Journey. His signature is his exceptionally long beard, which is often the key to finding him. In his first appearance, he was responsible for sending Wally on a quest to discover the truth about himself, and he has tagged along on Wally's travels ever since. His appearance in The Ultimate Fun Book, however, is in only one scene in "Old Friends" and his presence is unmentioned in the book and acts as one of the background characters.
- The Wally Watchers are Wally's devoted fan-club that first appeared in Where's Wally?: The Ultimate Fun Book (1990). They turn up wherever Wally goes, dressed in the same red-and-white striped outfit. While 25 appear in most books, there are in comparison, 99 of them in the Ultimate Fun Book.
- In the earlier books, a character appears in every scene, which the reader must look to find out who it is. This is because no information on the characters is given in the books aside from the task to look for them. The characters appeared as background characters and all had something unique to them, like blonde hair or a ginger beard. In some cases, characters from previous scenes would also appear.
- Odlulu, Wally and Wenda's arch-nemesis, a villainous pre-teen female Anti-Wanderer who is a genderbend version of Odlaw in the 2019 animated series. She sports a yellow baseball cap with black stripes and glasses with angular black frames, and shoulder-length black hair with a yellow streak. She wears a long-sleeved black and yellow top, and a yellow skirt, knee-high black socks with white cuffs and blue shoes.
- Fritz, a hungry ferret who is Odlulu's henchman and appeared in the 2019 animated series.

== Publications ==
=== Primary books ===
As of 2026, there are seven primary Wally books. The books were released both in hard-cover (for the original books) and subsequently in paperback. Each contains around a dozen scenes with Wally hidden in them. Each book has additional hidden objects and/or characters hidden in each scene specific to that book. The books usually reserve telling the reader about some item(s) to find until the end of the book so that the reader will have to go through the book again. The books contain checklists for each scene of interesting things or people to find.

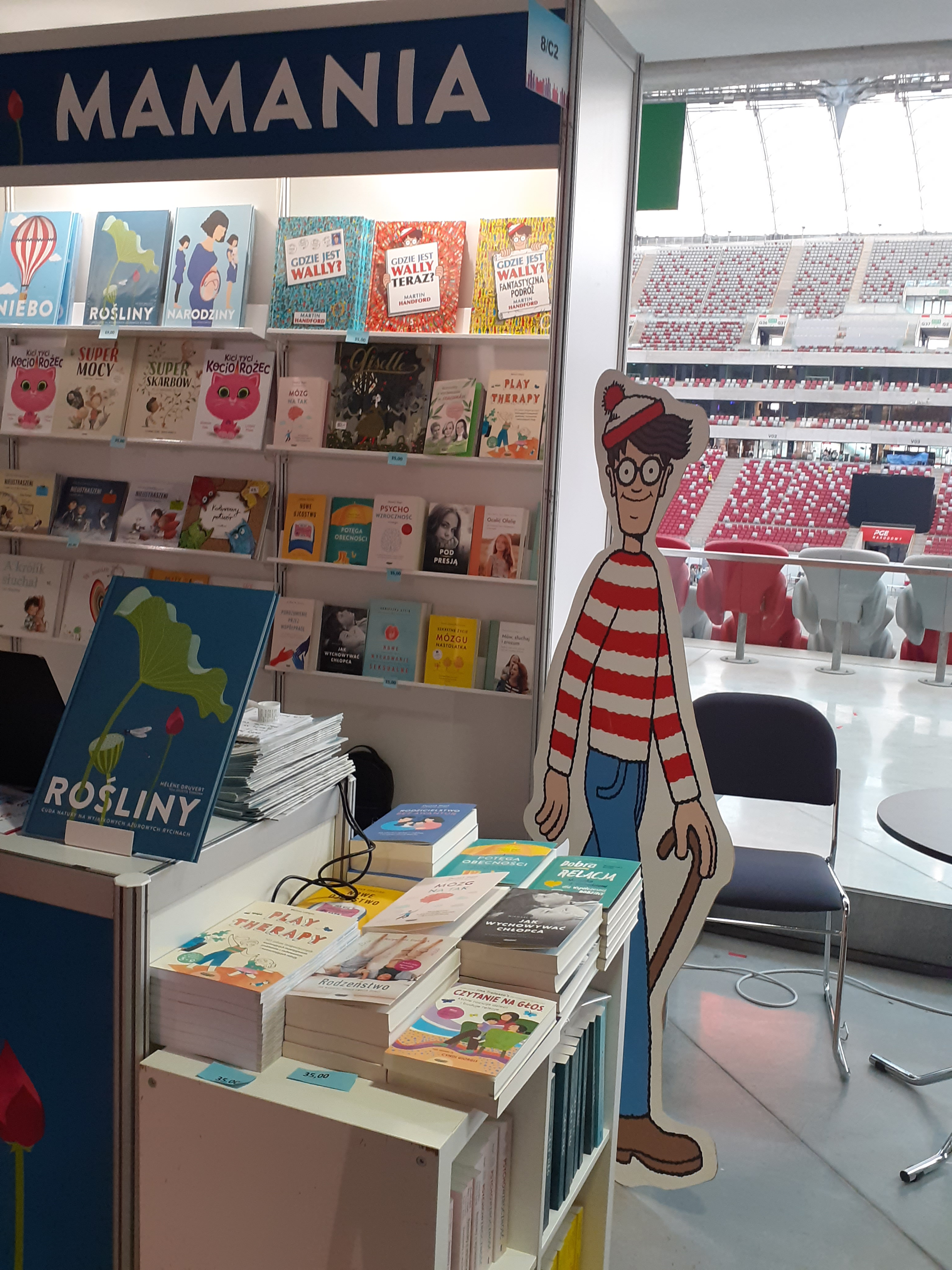
The first three Polish editions of the Where's Wally? books (top right in book shelf) at the 2023 Warsaw International Book Fair

1. Where's Wally? (North American title: Where's Waldo?) (1987)
2. Where's Wally Now? (North American title: Find Waldo Now, renamed Where's Waldo Now? later) (1988)
3. Where's Wally? The Fantastic Journey (North American title: The Great Waldo Search, renamed Where's Waldo? The Fantastic Journey later) (1989)
4. Where's Wally in Hollywood? (North American title: Where's Waldo in Hollywood?) (1993)
5. Where's Wally? The Wonder Book (North American title: Where's Waldo? The Wonder Book) (1997)
6. Where's Wally? The Great Picture Hunt! (North American title: Where's Waldo? The Great Picture Hunt!) (2006)
7. Where's Wally? The Incredible Paper Chase (North American title: Where's Waldo? The Incredible Paper Chase) (2009)

There have been three rounds of revised editions. In 1993, to coincide with the publication of In Hollywood, the first three books were reprinted with Wenda, Woof and the Wally Watchers added to the original illustrations, and the books were numbered on the cover. A "pocket edition" of the first book was also published, in a tiny A6 format (105 by 148 millimetres; 4.1 in × 5.8 in). Wally is even harder to spot when shrunk to this degree, and later printings included a free magnifying lens.

In 1997, to coincide with the publication of The Wonder Book, special "Tenth Anniversary Editions" of the first four books were published with a distinct silver border on their front covers, and added later-introduced characters and objects to look for in every scene, and also moved Wally to different locations from the original versions. These special editions appeared in both standard and "pocket" formats.

In 2007, for the 20th anniversary of the first book, the special editions of 1997 (and The Great Picture Hunt) were re-released with a new cover into paperback format. The silver borders on the books were removed and instead, the books were numbered in the top left-hand corner of the cover. Aside from the new numbering system, some of the front covers were also revised otherwise; for example, the "NOW?" on the cover of Where's Wally Now? was given a 2D effect, but it was originally designed to look like a 3D shape.

=== Other books ===
In addition to the primary books, other books have also been published in the Wally franchise. The first alternate-format Wally book was the Ultimate Fun Book. In addition to standard Wally scenes, this paperback activity book featured other types of games and activities, as well as cardboard punch-outs and stickers. The Magnificent Poster Book, which was a large-format book of posters including five scenes from past books and six new scenes (later included in The Great Picture Hunt).

- Where's Wally?: The Ultimate Fun Book (1990)
  - Activity book
- Where's Wally?: The Magnificent Poster Book! (1991)
  - Larger book containing cut-out posters
- Where's Wally? The Dazzling Deep-sea Divers Sticker Book (1994)
  - Sticker book and play scene
- Where's Wally? The Fabulous Flying Carpets Sticker Book (1994)
  - Sticker book and play scene
- A Where's Wally? Fun Fact Book: Plundering Pirates (2000)
  - Educational Where's Wally? book with new scenes and facts
- A Where's Wally? Fun Fact Book: Fighting Knights (2000)
  - Educational Where's Wally? book with new scenes and facts
- Where's Wally? (2008)
  - A £1 World Book Day Book
- Where's Wally? The Spectacular Poster Book (2010)
  - Larger book containing cut-out posters
- Where's Wally? The Search for the Lost Things (2012)
- Where's Wally? 25th Anniversary Annual (2012)
- Where's Waldo? The Spectacular Spotlight Search (2018)
- Where's Waldo? Spooky Spotlight Search (2020)
- Where's Waldo? Santa Spotlight Search (2021)
- Where's Waldo? Double Trouble at the Museum (2022)
- Where's Waldo? Destination: Everywhere! (2022)
- Where's Waldo?: The Great Speed Search (2023)
- Where's Waldo? The Great Games Speed Search (2024)
- Where's Wally? The Mighty Magical Mix-Up (North American title: Where's Waldo? The Mighty Magical Mix-Up) (2024)
- Where's Waldo? Amazing Journeys: The Ultimate Maze Adventure! (2025)
- Where's Waldo? The Magnificent Movie Spotlight Search (2025)
- Where's Waldo? Spooky Spot the Difference (2026)

Several other "activity books" have also been published featuring art from the "Where's Wally" comic strip:

- Where's Wally? The Truly Terrific Activity Book (1993)
- Where's Wally? The Absolutely Amazing Activity Book (1993)
- Where's Wally? The Wildly Wonderful Activity Book (1994)
- Where's Wally? Simply Sensational Activity Book (1994)
- Where's Wally? The Really Remarkable Activity Book (1995)
- Where's Wally? The Completely Crazy Activity Book (1995)
- Where's Wally? Bumper Activity Book (1995) – previous four books in one volume.

The first six activity books mentioned were reprinted in 2009 in a smaller size with different packaging.

=== Collections ===
Year	Title	Contains
1995	Bumper Activity Book	The Wildly Wonderful Activity Book, The Simply Sensational Activity Book, The Really Remarkable Activity Book and The Completely Crazy Activity Books in one large book.
2000	Boxed Set	Where's Wally?, Where's Wally Now?, The Ultimate Fun Book, The Truly Terrific Activity Book and The Absolutely Amazing Activity Book
2004	The Completely Cool Collection	Where's Wally?, Where's Wally Now?, The Fantastic Journey, In Hollywood and The Wonder Book special editions
2006	The Mega Mini Collection	Where's Wally?, Where's Wally Now?, The Fantastic Journey and In Hollywood mini special editions.
2007	The Solid Gold Collection	Where's Wally?, Where's Wally Now?, The Fantastic Journey, In Hollywood, The Wonder Book special editions and The Fabulous Flying Carpets Sticker Book.
2009	The Ultimate Travel Collection	Where's Wally?, Where's Wally Now?, The Fantastic Journey, In Hollywood and The Wonder Book special editions in one travel-sized book.
2009	The Magnificent Mini Box Set	Where's Wally?, Where's Wally Now?, The Fantastic Journey, In Hollywood and The Wonder Book mini special editions with special Where's Wally? magnifying glass.
2011	The Totally Essential Travel Collection	Where's Wally?, Where's Wally Now?, The Fantastic Journey, In Hollywood, The Wonder Book, The Great Picture Hunt and The Incredible Paper Chases special editions in one travel-sized book.
2012	The Wow Collection	Where's Wally?, Where's Wally Now?, The Fantastic Journey, In Hollywood, The Wonder Book, and The Great Picture Hunt special editions and an 80-piece jigsaw puzzle (of WallyWorld Again, from The Great Picture Hunt!) in a hardcover slipcase.

=== Publication details ===
- As of 2022, only the special editions of the original five books are still in print, as well as a paperback 2007 reprint of The Great Picture Hunt and a paperback 2010 reprint of The Incredible Paper Chase. These books now also have "Special extra searches inside", according to the front covers.
- 1997's The Wonder Book was the last numbered book in the series to contain exclusively new, original scenes, as The Great Picture Hunt and The Incredible Paper Chase contain both new scenes and older ones from The Ultimate Fun Book and The Magnificent Poster Book, as these books are no longer in print.
- The scene originally titled "Among the Pirates" is the most used, as it has appeared in 1991's The Magnificent Poster Book, 2000's Plundering Pirates, 2006's The Great Picture Hunt, and a jigsaw puzzle.

=== Magazine ===
A series of geographical magazines for children was published in the United Kingdom, Ukraine, Ireland, Australia, New Zealand, South Africa, Portugal, Poland, Brazil, Spain, France, Hungary, Czech Republic, Malta, Bulgaria and Russia, called Wally's World. In each issue Wally travelled to a different country or region of the world giving the reader interesting facts. 52 issues were published from January 1997 to January 1998, when Wally's History of the World began, focusing more on history than geography. The first issue was given away free with the last issue of Wally's World.

=== Comic strip ===
For several years in the early and mid-1990s, Where's Waldo? was turned into a North American Sunday newspaper comic/puzzle strip, drawn by Stephan Martinière and distributed by King Features Syndicate. The strip was later translated and reworked for international markets.

Several activity books of the comic strip were released in the mid-1990s under both Where's Waldo? and Where's Wally? branding:

- The Completely Crazy Activity Book
- The Really Remarkable Activity Book
- The Simply Sensational Activity Book
- The Wildly Wonderful Activity Book

== Adaptations in other media ==
=== Television series ===
A 13-episode animated series, Where's Wally?, with Townsend Coleman as the voice of Wally, was produced by DIC Entertainment for CBS in 1991 for the North American market under the "Waldo" name. The show was later translated for international markets, usually renaming the character to match the books of that country. The dialogue and theme song were recorded in alternative Wally versions, with the same voice cast of the original American production, in order to market the show in the UK. It was aired on ITV in the UK and the distribution rights to the show are currently held by HIT Entertainment.

The second animated series by DreamWorks Animation Television aired on Universal Kids in 2019. The voice cast includes Joshua Rush as the voice of Waldo, Haley Tju as Wenda, Eva Carlton as Odlulu (the female equivalent to Odlaw), Thomas Lennon as Wizard Whitebeard and Piotr Michael as Woof. The series later moved to Peacock.

=== Film ===
A film based on the Where's Wally? series has been pursued by various studios. Nickelodeon took interest in the idea, but cancelled its plans due to internal changes at Paramount, its corporate sister. In 2009, Universal Pictures (which later obtained ownership of Where's Wally? through its acquisition of Classic Media's owner DreamWorks Animation in 2016) and Illumination acquired the rights to turn Where's Wally? into a live-action film, but this project was also cancelled.

In 2011, Metro-Goldwyn-Mayer and Classic Media announced a live-action film based on the Where's Waldo? series. Screenwriter Todd Berger has been hired to write the story for the film, which was slated to be released in the summer of 2015. In 2016, Seth Rogen and Evan Goldberg were in talks to produce the film with their producing partner James Weaver and Kyle Hunter and Ariel Shaffir to write the film, under their Point Grey Pictures banner.

The 1994 comedy film Naked Gun 33 1/3: The Final Insult, starring Leslie Nielsen and Priscilla Presley, features a cameo appearance by Waldo at the end of the film during a scene that takes place at the Academy Awards.

=== Video games ===
- Where's Waldo? (1991) (NES)
- The Great Waldo Search (1992) (NES, SNES, Mega Drive)
- Wally wo Sagase! (1992) (Arcade) (Japan-exclusive title developed and published by Sega)
- Wally wo Sagase! Ehon no Kuni no Daibouken (1993) (Super Famicom) (Japan-exclusive title published by Tomy)
- Where's Waldo at the Circus (1995) (PC)
- Where's Waldo?: Exploring Geography (1996) (PC)
- Where's Waldo?: The Fantastic Journey (2009) (PC, Mac, Nintendo Wii, Nintendo DS, iPhone, iPad, iPod Touch)
- Where's Waldo? in Hollywood (2010) (iPhone, iPad, iPod Touch)
- Waldo & Friends (2015) (iOS, Android) (published by Ludia in 2015; no longer available for download)

=== Cereal boxes ===
In the early 1990s Quaker Life Cereal in the US carried various Where's Waldo? scenes on the back of the boxes along with collector's cards, toys and send-away prizes. This was shown in The Simpsons episode "Hello Gutter, Hello Fadder" where Homer shouts "Waldo, where are you?!" after looking at the scene on the cereal box as Waldo walks by the kitchen window.

=== Google Maps ===
On 1 April 2018, Google Maps added a minigame in which one can look for Waldo and his friends around the world – in the Andes (Chile), Surfers Paradise beach (Australia), in the Pyeongchang Olympic Stadium (South Korea), at the La Tomatina festival (Spain), in Hollywood and in the Picard crater on the Moon.

== Real-life Where's Wally? phenomena ==
=== World record attempts ===
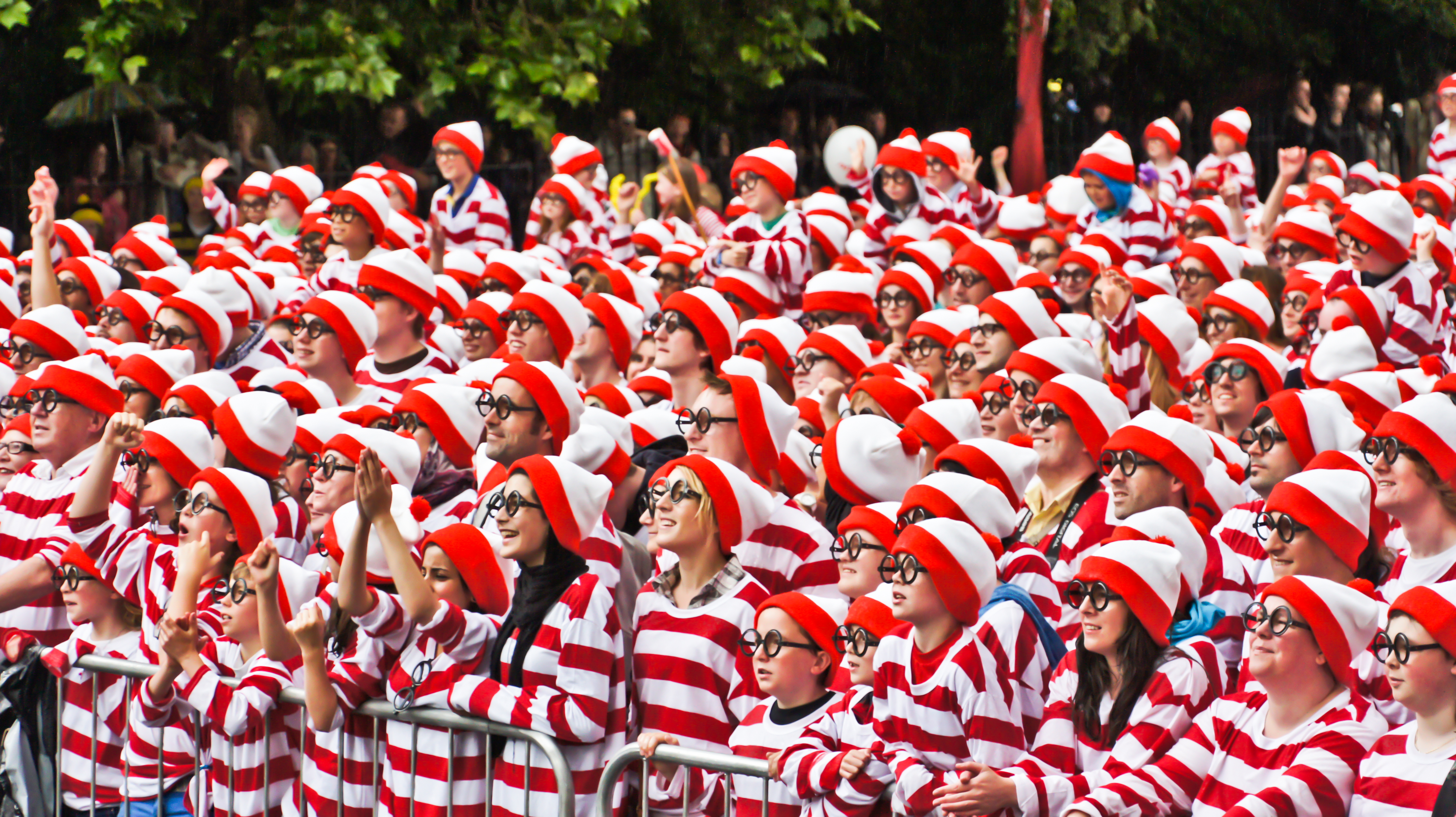
Attendees at the 2011 Where's Wally? World Record event in Dublin, Ireland

In 2009, 1,052 students, alumni, and members of the community at Rutgers University in New Brunswick, New Jersey, captured the Guinness World Record for the largest gathering of people dressed as Wally. The event raised money for local public schools. In 2011, the previous record was broken when 3,872 people dressed as Wally gathered in Merrion Square, Dublin, Ireland. The record was beaten in 2017 when 4,626 people dressed as Wally gathered in Japan, after three failed attempts.

The Waldo Waldo 5K has tried to break the record in a 5-kilometre fun run to raise money for the Waldo Canyon Fire burn area in Colorado Springs, Colorado, US, every year since the fire in July 2012. The first attempt, on 21 October, had just over a thousand. The second attempt, on 27 October 2013, had over 2,700. The third attempt, on 26 October 2014, hosted 3,104 participants. The fourth attempt, on 17 October 2015, increased the count to 3,400 participants. The fifth attempt was made on 22 October 2016, with a final count of 3,524. The next race was held on 21 October 2017. The last race was held on 20 October 2018, with a final count of 3,809.

=== Real-life re-creation ===
On 12 September 2009, a re-creation took place in downtown Chicago. The re-creation featured all of the characters, Waldo, Wenda, Wizard Whitebeard, Odlaw, and Woof, hiding throughout downtown Chicago and invited others to come and find them. Universities (such as the University of Exeter) have had Where's Wally inspired societies, in which members may dress as Wally whilst playing games such as hide-and-seek on campus grounds.

== See also ==
- Wimmelbilderbuch – type of wordless picture book
