= The Waldo Waldo 5K =

Annual 5k run

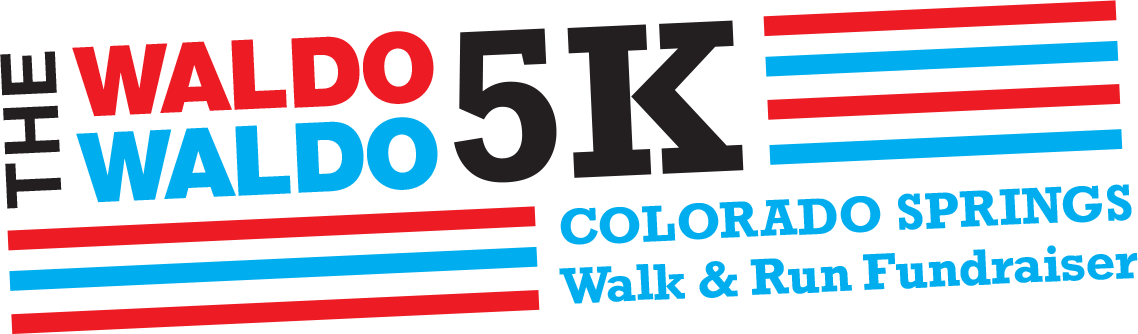
- Status: Active
- Genre: 5k run
- Frequency: Annual
- Location: Colorado Springs, Colorado
- Country: United States of America
- Years active: 7
- Inaugurated: October 21, 2012
- Founder: Chelise Foster
- Most recent: October 20, 2018
- Sponsor: elope, Inc.
- Website: waldowaldo.com

The Waldo Waldo 5K was an annual five-kilometer walk/run hosted in Colorado Springs, Colorado. Participants dressed in Where's Waldo costumes included with the price of admission, with raised funds going towards "Waldo Canyon restoration, disaster relief, fire recovery, outdoor activities and trails and open space maintenance in the local community."

== History ==
The race was founded by Chelise Foster in 2012 as a response to the Waldo Canyon Wildfire. According to a Q&A with Foster, it was originally meant to be a small gathering of volunteers that would dress up in Where's Waldo costumes to clean up the Waldo Canyon, but instead became a fundraiser to help offset the financial burden following the disaster. Foster was an elope, Inc. employee at the time, and the company agreed to provide Waldo and Wenda costumes at a discount for the event, and has been the presenting sponsor since. The inaugural race at the America the Beautiful Park included over 1,000 participants, and raised approximately $20,000 for the Waldo Canyon Firefighter Relief Fund. The seventh and final race, the Waldo Waldo 5K Grand Finale, was held on October 20, 2018.

== Event ==
In subsequent iterations, the Waldo Waldo 5K split raised funds between the Trails and Open Space Coalition and the Rocky Mountain Field Institute. Since 2012, event organizers attempted to break the Guinness World Record for "Largest gathering of people dressed as Wally/Waldo" with no success. In an interview with Fox 21 News during the 2014 5K, Foster stated,"We have about 3,200 this year. But the world record has always been secondary. If we get the world record that’s great, but it’s really just a fun way to get people out here."

Before 2014, the 5K ran through the America the Beautiful Park. It now begins and ends at the Pioneers Museum in central Downtown Colorado Springs. Recent events have included yoga classes, food trucks, and exhibitors before and after the event. Live music and a beer garden were added at the 2015 race.

== Reception ==
The event generally received favorable views from participants and spectators. Several runners at the 2015 event described it as a "fun experience" and "a symbol of teamwork and unification." In 2014, the Colorado Springs Independent gave the Waldo Waldo 5K a rank of silver in the "Best Fundraising Event" category.

== Participation ==
	Meaning
Red	World Record Attempt Failed
Yellow	World Record Made (Since Broken)
Green	Holds current World Record

Date	Participants
October 21, 2012	Over 1,000
October 27, 2013	Over 2,700
October 26, 2014	3,104
October 17, 2015	3,400
October 22, 2016	3,524
October 21, 2017	3,247
October 20, 2018	3,809
