= Where's Wally Now? =

Book by Martin Handford

- The American re-release of the book
- Author: Martin Handford
- Illustrator: Martin Handford
- Language: English
- Subject: Where's Wally?
- Publisher: UK: Walker Books; US: Little Brown & Co, then Candlewick Press
- Publication date: 14 September 1988
- Publication place: United Kingdom
- Media type: Print (hardback)
- Pages: 26
- ISBN: 0-7636-0308-2 (special edition)
- OCLC: 36776403
- LC Class: PZ7.H1918 Whc 1997

Where's Wally Now? (called Find Waldo Now and later Where's Waldo Now? in the US) is the second Where's Wally? book. It was first published in 1988. In the book Wally travels through time as he visits many different locations and events. He also loses a book on each page, which the reader has to find.

The book was re-released in October 1997 in a special edition where Wally was moved in each picture and additional characters were added for the reader to find (Woof, Wizard Whitebeard, Wenda, Odlaw, the Wally Watchers and others).

The book has since been re-published into a smaller size/format.

== Scenes ==
- The Stone Age (unknown)
- The Riddle of the Pyramids (2590 BC)
- Fun and Games in Ancient Rome (58 AD)
- On Tour with the Vikings (985 AD)
- The End of the Crusades (1188 AD) (before 2016 editions)
- Chaos at the Castle (1188 AD) (since 2016 editions)
- Once Upon a Saturday Morning (1388 AD)
- The Last Days of the Aztecs (1520 AD)
- Trouble in Old Japan (1588 AD)
- Being a Pirate (1738 AD)
- Having a Ball in Gaye Paree (1870 AD)
- The Gold Rush (1888 AD)
- The Future (unknown)
