= Where's Wally? The Fantastic Journey =

1989 book by Martin Handford

- Author: Martin Handford
- Illustrator: Martin Handford
- Language: English
- Subject: Where's Wally?
- Publisher: UK: Walker Books; US: Little Brown & Co, then Candlewick Press
- Publication date: 16 September 1989
- Publication place: United Kingdom
- Media type: Print (hardback)
- Pages: 26
- ISBN: 0-316-34282-3
- OCLC: 20533060
- LC Class: PZ7.H1918 Gr 1989

Where's Wally? The Fantastic Journey (originally numbered with a "3"; originally called The Great Waldo Search in North America; now called Where's Waldo? The Fantastic Journey) is the third Where's Wally? book, first released in 1989. In the book Wally travels to fantasy lands in search of Wizard Whitebeard's magical scrolls. The book introduces the second recurring Where's Wally character, Wizard Whitebeard. Readers are also asked for the first time to find the Wizard's scrolls.

The book introduces "The Land of Wallies" and the concept that Wally is just one of many Wallies. The Land of Wallys would reappear in The Ultimate Fun Book (known as WallyLand) and The Great Picture Hunt (known as WallyWorld). It would later be shown that Woof and Odlaw also come from worlds of many others like them with the introduction of "The Odlaw Swamp" and "The Land of Woofs" in Where's Wally?: The Wonder Book.

The book was re-released in 1993 and again in 1997, moving Wally and inserting new characters (Woof, Wenda, Odlaw, the Wally Watchers, and others), and again once more into a smaller size. In 2017 the book was the third biggest seller of World Book Day, having been selected as one of ten books that would be promoted for it.

Two video game adaptations of this book were released. The first one was The Great Waldo Search, which was released in 1992 for the NES, SNES and the Sega Genesis. The second is a remake titled Where's Waldo? The Fantastic Journey, which was released on iOS, Microsoft Windows, Wii and Nintendo DS almost two decades later in 2009. The latter takes advantage of pointer-based motion controls to provide a more intuitive experience in searching for targets, and includes a two-player versus mode for family-friendly competition.

== Scenes ==
1. The Gobbling Gluttons
2. The Battling Monks
3. The Carpet Flyers
4. The Great Ball Game Players
5. The Ferocious Red Dwarves
6. The Nasty Nasties
7. The Fighting Foresters
8. The Deep Sea Divers
9. The Knights of the Magic Flag
10. The Unfriendly Giants
11. The Underground Hunters
12. The Land of Wallies
