= David Kalvitis =

- Born: David R Kalvitis; Poughkeepsie, New York, U.S.
- Occupations: Graphic designer and puzzle inventor
- Website: www.monkeyingaround.com

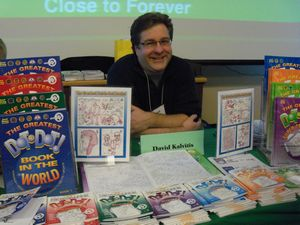
David Kalvitis at the 2011 Rochester Children's Book Festival.

David Kalvitis is an artist, graphic designer, puzzle inventor, and owner of Monkeying Around, publisher of his collections of dot-to-dot-puzzles. Born in Poughkeepsie, New York, Kalvitis is the eldest of three children. He currently resides in Rochester, New York.

Kalvitis is a graduate of Syracuse University, where he earned a Fine Arts degree in Editorial Design. During his senior year, he placed second in the International Print Magazine Cover Design Contest.

After running his own graphic design business in Rochester for 13 years, Kalvitis began his publishing career with the creation of The Greatest Dot-to-Dot Books in the World in 2000.

Since 2000 Kalvitis has published 18 hand-designed puzzle books.

To date, his books have sold over one million copies worldwide.

== Published works ==
=== Books ===
- The Greatest Dot-to-Dot Books in the World Monkeying Around
  - Book 1, 2000 – ISBN 978-0-9700437-0-2
  - Book 2, 2001 – ISBN 978-0-9700437-1-9
  - Book 3, 2002 – ISBN 978-0-9700437-2-6
  - Book 4, 2003 – ISBN 978-0-9700437-3-3
- The Greatest Dot-to-Dot Super Challenge Books Monkeying Around
  - Book 5, 2007 – ISBN 978-0-9700437-4-0
  - Book 6, 2008 – ISBN 978-0-9700437-5-7
  - Book 7, 2009 – ISBN 978-0-9799753-0-1
  - Book 8, 2010 – ISBN 978-0-9799753-1-8
- The Greatest Dot-to-Dot Adventure Books Monkeying Around
  - Book 1, 2012 - ISBN 978-0-9799753-2-5
  - Book 2, 2014 - ISBN 978-0-9799753-3-2
- We Are Connected Dot-to-Dot Philadelphia Book Monkeying Around
  - 2017 - ISBN 978-0-9975907-0-8
- The Greatest Dot-to-Dot Mini Travel Newspaper Books Monkeying Around
  - Volume 1, 2005 – ISBN 978-0-9700437-6-4
  - Volume 2, 2005 – ISBN 978-0-9700437-7-1
  - Volume 3, 2006 – ISBN 978-0-9700437-8-8
  - Volume 4, 2006 – ISBN 978-0-9700437-9-5
  - Volume 5, 2007 – ISBN 978-0-9799753-6-3
  - Volume 6, 2007 – ISBN 978-0-9799753-7-0
  - Volume 7, 2011 – ISBN 978-0-9799753-8-7
  - Volume 8, 2011 – ISBN 978-0-9799753-9-4

=== Awards ===
- Creative Child Magazine Awards 2015 Book of the Year Award
- National Parenting Center Seal of Approval Holiday 2012 Seal of Approval
- National Parenting Center Seal of Approval Holiday 2010 Seal of Approval
- National Parenting Center Seal of Approval Holiday 2003 Seal of Approval

=== Jointly authored books ===
- Twisting History: Lessons in Balloon Sculpting Parma Publishing, 1995 ISBN 978-0-9648497-3-0
