= Lytham Academy of Theatre Arts =

The Lytham Academy of Theatre Arts (LATA) is a British theatre group located in Lytham, Lancashire.

The Lytham Academy of Theatre Arts formed in 1994 is a society open to anyone aged 10–18 years old. They perform shows every November in the main theatre of Lytham, Lowther Pavilion.

Productions performed by LATA have included The Vackees, Half a Sixpence, Dracula Spectacula, Barnum, West Side Story, Pendragon, Oklahoma!, Me and My Girl, Copacabana, Oliver!, and Meet Me in St. Louis. Their most recent production of Les Misérables is their most successful show to date, with all 5 performances sold out, and standing ovations after each. They also reportedly broke all box office records at the Pavilion with the show, and had the highest selling matinée performance there, ever.

The society is associated with NODA (National Operatic and Dramatic Association), from whom LATA have won many awards for individual and group performances. They have won the Best Overall Youth Production award twice, for Barnum and West Side Story.

The group began as a youth section of the group Lytham Amateur Operatic Society (LAOS) but recently LATA became a separate entity. Many of LATA's past members have gone on to drama schools and stage productions all over the country.

== Past Productions ==
- 1994 – The Rock and Roll Years
- 1995 – The Vackees
- 1996 – Half a Sixpence
- 1997 – Spirit of the Stage
- 1998 – Dazzle
- 1999 – Dracula Spectacular
- 2000 – Barnum
- 2001 – West Side Story
- 2002 – Pendragon
- 2003 – Oklahoma
- 2004 – Me and My Girl
- 2005 – Copacabana
- 2006 – Oliver
- 2007 – Meet Me in St. Louis
- 2008 – Seussical
- 2009 – Thoroughly Modern Millie
- 2010 – Les Misérables
- 2011– "Our House"
- 2012- "Beauty And The Beast"
