= Puzzle book =

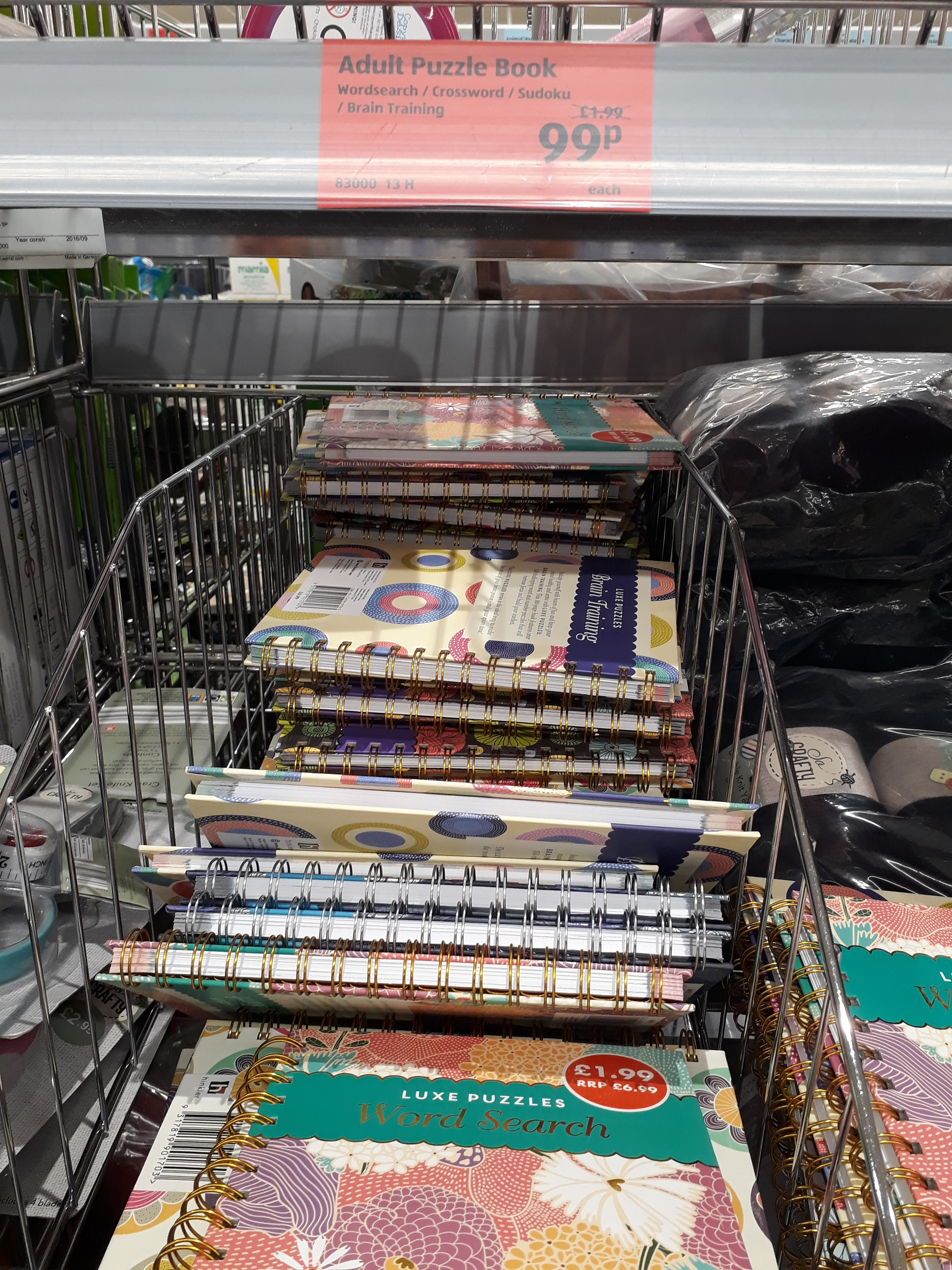
Adult puzzle books (wordsearch, crossword, sudoku, brain training) on offer in a store.

A puzzle book is a type of activity book which contains a collection of puzzles for the reader to complete. Puzzle books may contain puzzles all of simply one type like (e.g. crosswords, sudoku, or wordsearch) or a mixture of different puzzle types. Puzzle books may be aimed for either adults or children. Puzzle books can be used for many purposes such as education or purely for entertainment.

The first crossword puzzle book was published in 1924 by the editors of the newspaper New York World.
