= Kate Petty =

British children's writer

- Born: Katharine Chapman; June 9, 1951; Welwyn Garden City, Hertfordshire, England
- Died: May 22, 2007 (aged 55); St Austell, Cornwall, England
- Education: University of York
- Occupations: Author, editor
- Writing career
- Notable works: The Great Grammar Book, The Amazing Pop-up Geography Book

Kate Petty (born Katharine Chapman, 9 June 1951 – 22 May 2007) was a British author of children's books including several on educational subjects with pop-ups and moveable parts.

Born in Welwyn Garden City, she studied at York University before becoming an editor at Jonathan Cape. One of her most successful publications was The Great Grammar Book, which was illustrated by Jennie Maizels, who illustrated several of her books. Petty was a prolific author, writing nearly 100 books, mostly non-fiction picture books for children.

She died in St Austell of cancer.

== Books ==
- The Great Grammar Book illustrated by Jennie Maizels
- The Amazing Pop-up Geography Book
- The Perfect Punctuation Pop-up Book
- The Super Science Book
- The Terrific Times Tables
- Earthly Treasures
- The Amazing Pop-Up Music Book
- The Global Garden
