= Where's Waldo? (2019 TV series) =

American animated children's television series

- Genre: Preschool; Comedy
- Based on: Where's Wally? by Martin Handford
- Developed by: Koyalee Chanda; Lucas Mills
- Voices of: Joshua Rush; Haley Tju; Eva Carlton; Thomas Lennon; Piotr Michael
- Theme music composer: Distant Cousins
- Composer: Ben Bromfield
- Country of origin: United States
- Original language: English
- No. of seasons: 2
- No. of episodes: 40

Production
- Executive producers: F.M. De Marco; John Tellegen
- Editor: Jeffrey Perlmutter
- Running time: 22 minutes
- Production company: DreamWorks Animation Television

Original release
- Network: Universal Kids (season 1); Peacock (season 2)
- Release: July 20, 2019 – July 3, 2021

Where's Waldo? (known outside North America as Where's Wally?) is an American animated children's television series produced by DreamWorks Animation Television, based on the Where's Wally? book series created by Martin Handford. It is the second television adaptation of the books, succeeding the 1991 animated series, and incorporates elements from the latter. The series debuted on Universal Kids on July 20, 2019. It moved to the streaming service Peacock for its second season on July 15, 2020. Additional episodes of the series aired on December 11 the same year, with the final episode airing on July 3, 2021.

== Premise ==
The series follows young members of the WorldWide Wanderer Society, Waldo and Wenda, who are sent on travel missions by their wizard friend, Wizard Whitebeard. Their archenemy, Odlulu, causes them trouble in their attempts to earn stripes and become wizard-level wanderers.

== Cast ==
=== Main ===
- Joshua Rush (US dub) and James Cartmell (UK dub) as Waldo, a 12-year-old Wanderer and the titular main protagonist in-training.
- Haley Tju (US dub) and Erin Austen (UK dub) as Wenda, a junior-level Wanderer and Waldo's best friend. Unlike her previous incarnations, she is dark-skinned and does not wear glasses; she also has a different outfit design.
- Eva Carlton (US dub) and Hannah Hutch (UK dub) as Odlulu, an Anti-Wanderer and the main antagonist who is a genderbend version of Odlaw. She is Waldo and Wenda's arch-nemesis.
- Thomas Lennon (US dub) and Adam Diggle (UK dub) as Wizard Whitebeard, a wizard-level Wanderer and a mentor to Waldo and Wenda.
- Piotr Michael (US dub) and Owen Crouch (UK dub) as Fritz, Odlulu's ferret pet and henchman.
  - Michael also voices Arfolomew, Woof (teased in A Wanderer's Christmas and first appeared in Season 2) and additional voices

=== Recurring and guest ===
- Bobby Moynihan as Wizard Wavybeard
- Retta as Wizard Nightingale
- Oscar Nunez as Wizard Featherbeard
- Tom Kenny as Wizard Blizzardbeard and various
- Al Yankovic as Wizard Artbeard
- Kerri Kenney-Silver as Wizard Lariat
- Danielle Pinnock as Wizard Doubloon
- Rachel Dratch as Wizard Fix-it
- Chris Sullivan as Santa Claus
- Carlos Alazraqui as Wizard Vinebeard
- Hannah Simone as Wizard Odissi
- Hudson Yang as Liu
- Cedric Yarbrough as Wizard Dustybeard
- Sumalee Montano as Wizard Flambé
- Randall Park as Wizard Shadowbeard
- Nichole Sakura as Wizard Amber
- Rob Riggle as Wizard Rockybeard
- Stephanie Beatriz as Wizard Melodia
- Cheri Oteri as Wizard Corriedale
- Jerry O'Connell as Jason
- Henry Winkler as Wizard Longbeard

== Episodes ==
=== Series overview ===
Season	Episodes	Originally released		
Season	Episodes	First released	Last released	Network
1	20	July 20, 2019	December 7, 2019	Universal Kids
2	20	July 15, 2020	July 3, 2021	Peacock

=== Season 1 (2019) ===
No. overall	No. in season	Title	Location	Directed by	Written by	Original release date
1	1	"Little Trouble in Big China"	Beijing, China	Christo Stamboliev	F.M. De Marco	July 20, 2019
Waldo and Wenda head to China at Beijing's Lunar New Year in order to get the Unfreeze Key for Wizard Whitebeard, but Odlulu and Fritz obtain the magic key which animates a stone dragon. The Wanderers then team up with young drummers Li and Liu to tame the dragon and save the celebration. Guest stars: Ian Inigo as Boy, Kristen Li as Li, Yuri Lowenthal as Zhang Wei, Hudson Yang as Liu; Wanderer key: Unfreeze Key
2	2	"A Wanderer in Paris"	Paris, France	Christo Stamboliev	Lucas Mills	July 21, 2019
Upon gaining a magical shrinking key, Odlulu sets her sights on winning the Tour de France. Waldo and Wenda end up helping racer Jacques after Odlulu shrinks his and everyone else's bikes. Guest stars: Ashley Bornancin as Camille, Tom Kenny as Shopkeeper, Yuri Lowenthal as Jacques / Official, Piotr Michael as Henri; Wanderer key: Teeny-Tiny Key
3	3	"A Day in Turkey"	Istanbul, Turkey	Mark Sonntag	John Tellegen	July 23, 2019
Landing in Istanbul, Waldo and Wenda meet up with fellow Wanderer Yasemin and discover that their rug is a map to a magic doubling key. When Odlulu and Fritz learn of the treasure map, the Wanderers must race to find it before the two bad guys do. Guest stars: Sydney Bell as Yasemin; Wanderer key: Doubling Key
4	4	"The Big New Mexico Pepper Hunt"	New Mexico, United States	Christo Stamboliev	John Tellegen	July 27, 2019
When Odlulu challenges the Wanderers to win the best chilli (along with a magic key) at an annual chilli cook-off in New Mexico, Whitebeard pulls out his family recipe to save the day. The only problem is that they don't have the most important ingredient - a ghost pepper. Guest stars: Candi Milo as Chili Judge / Grandmother, Max Mittelman as Tarak; Wanderer key: Pepper Key
5	5	"Hang Ten in Tahiti"	Tahiti, French Polynesia	Mark Sonntag	Sam Cherington	August 3, 2019
Wizard Wavybeard has lost the Wave Key leading Waldo and Wenda to go to Tahiti. When Odlulu steals Wavybeard's surfboard and the magic key in order to win the local surf competition, the Wanderers have to beat Odlulu and Fritz by getting his surfboard and the key back from them. Guest stars: Ashley Bornancin as Surfing Instructor, Bobby Moynihan as Wizard Wavybeard; Wanderer key: Wave Key
6	6	"Victoria Falls & Winters"	Victoria Falls, Zimbabwe	Lianne Hughes	John Tellegen	August 10, 2019
When the watering hole at a Zimbabwean animal park dries up, the Wanderers grab a rain production Weather Key and arrive to save the animals. Fritz however steals the key from Waldo for Odlulu so she can be a Mother Nature-like goddess, so the Wanderers form an alliance with fellow Wanderer Anesu on a wild chase through rain, fog, and snow to get the key back from her and save the animals. Guest stars: Nesta Cooper as Anesu, Isaac C. Singleton Jr. as Mr. Grouchy; Wanderer key: Weather Key
7	7	"Vienna Voice-Versa"	Vienna, Austria	Christo Stamboliev	Lucas Mills	August 17, 2019
When Wizard Whitebeard attempts to magically enhance his voice for a singing duet with an old Wizard friend, he accidentally switches bodies with Arf, forcing Waldo and Wenda to undo the mistake before it is too late. Guest stars: Tara Platt as Hostess, Retta as Wizard Nightingale; Wanderer key: Body Switch Key
8	8	"Costa Rica... in Color!"	Costa Rica, Central America	Lianne Hughes	Sam Cherington	August 24, 2019
Waldo and Wenda head to Costa Rica and team up with Wizard Featherbeard to stop Odlulu from using the Color Key to steal all colors in the forest, including plants and animals. Guest stars: Oscar Nunez as Wizard Featherbeard; Wanderer key: Color Key
9	9	"Yukon Do It"	Yukon, Canada	Kelly Baigent	Sam Cherington	September 21, 2019
Arf gets a chance to run with sled dogs when he travels with Waldo and Wenda to wintry northern Yukon in Canada to deliver a birthday present (the magic key) to Wizard Blizzardbeard. When Odlulu and Fritz steal Blizzardbeard's present, the Wanderers go on a mad chase to get the birthday gift back from them. Guest stars: Tom Kenny as Wizard Blizzardbeard / Serve, Candace Kozak as Shila; Wanderer key: Marshmallow Key
10	10	"The Strength of Scotland"	Scotland, United Kingdom	Lianne Hughs	John Tellgen	September 28, 2019
The Wanderers head to Scotland, where Odlulu is using the Strength Key to give her an advantage and cheating in the Highland Games. Wenda competes while Waldo and Whitebeard try to get the key from Fritz. Guest stars: Grace Kaufman as Morna, Christian Lanz as Announcer, Yuri Lowenthal as Fergus / Yep; Wanderer key: Strength Key
11	11	"Hit or Myth in Greece"	Acropolis of Athens, Greece	Lianne Hughs	F.M. De Marco	October 6, 2019
When Odlulu uses the Greek Myth Key to bring Greek myths to life so she can steal the Golden Fleece, the Wanderers embark on a legendary quest to restore order in modern Athens with the help of the mythic Jason of the Argo. Guest stars: Grey Griffin as Ticket Taker / Sirens, Jerry O'Connell as Jason, Isaac C. Singleton Jr. as Cyclops; Wanderer key: Greek Myth Key
12	12	"Venice the Menace"	Venice, Italy	Ricky Santana	Sam Cherington	October 12, 2019
The Wanderers head to Venice to get a new cookie jar, where Odlulu aims to become belle of the Masquerade Ball and steal the Crystal Glass Key from the stained glass window to make her shoes. Guest stars: Christian Lanz as Shopkeeper, Tara Platt as Elisabetta, "Weird Al" Yankovic as Wizard Artbeard; Wanderer key: Crystal Glass Key
13	13	"Australian Blunder Down Under"	Australia, Oceania	Murray Debus	Madison Bateman	October 19, 2019
Waldo and Wenda head to Australia to return the borrowed Boomerang Key to wizard named Lariat while Odlulu and Fritz plan to steal a magic key. When a mother kangaroo hops away with Waldo's hat and Fritz, the Wanderers and Odlulu must work together to find them in the Australian outback. Guest stars: Eric Bauza as Bruce / Koala / Dingo, Kerri Kenney-Silver as Wizard Lariat / Emu / Platypus, Candi Milo as Kookaburra, Mama Kangaroo; Wanderer key: Boomerang Key and Talk to Animals Key
14	14	"Big in Japan"	Tokyo, Japan	Seth Kearsley	John Tellegen	October 26, 2019
When Odlulu accidentally zaps Fritz with the Mega Mega Monster key which grows to monstrous size, Waldo and Wenda travel to a Kaiju festival in Tokyo and team up with Koichi to stop Mega Fritz from eating all the noodles in the city. Guest stars: Ian Inigo as Reo, Ryan Potter as Koichi, Jennie Kwan & Yuri Lowenthal; Wanderer key: Mega Mega Monster Key
15	15	"A New York Minute"	New York, United States	Ricky Santana	Sam Cherington	November 2, 2019
Wizard Whitebeard trains for months for a marathon in New York City. When Odlulu schemes to win the race by slowing down all of runners, people and vehicles, Waldo and Wenda use New York's various modes of transportation to save the marathon from Odlulu. Guest stars: Raini Rodriguez as Maria, Jennie Kwan & Christian Lanz; Wanderer key: Slow Mo Key
16	16	"Bahama Drama"	The Bahamas	Lianne Hughes	Sam Cherington	November 9, 2019
When Captain Odlulu and First Mate Fritz steal the Bubble Key from Wizard Doubloon to raise a sunken pirate ship in the Bahamas in her quest for treasure, the Wanderers must take to the high seas to catch the bubble-wielding buccaneer before she makes off with the ship's booty and steal people's Johnny bread. Guest stars: Danielle Pinnock as Wizard Doubloon, Dallas Young as Mateo; Wanderer key: Bubble Key
17	17	"Chilling Out in Antarctica"	Antarctica	Naz Ghodrati-Azadi	Lucas Mills	November 16, 2019
The Wanderers travel to Antarctica to witness the annual march of the emperor penguins, but a new ice castle accidentally blocks the mother penguins' path and they have to find a way to enter the nesting grounds. When the leopard seals take over Odlulu's ice castle and steal a magic key, the Wanderers, Odlulu and Fritz must work together to retrieve it and escape with the mother penguins to safety. Guest stars: Corina Boettger as Hillary, Ely Henry as Edmund; Wanderer key: Ice Castle Key
18	18	"Mini Mayhem in Moscow"	Moscow, Russia	Naz Ghodrati-Azadi	F.M. De Marco	November 23, 2019
After Whitebeard uses the Grow Key to make himself 40 feet tall, the key breaks and the Wanderers take the key to Wizard Fix-It in Moscow. While mending the key, Fix-It accidentally makes Waldo, Wenda and herself two inches tall, then loses the key. Guest stars: Rachel Dratch as Wizard Fix-It, Tom Kenny as Cuckoo / Vendor; Wanderer key: Grow Key
19	19	"The Swiss Mess"	Zermatt, Switzerland	Naz Ghodrati-Azadi	Mimi Hess	November 30, 2019
The Wanderers head to Switzerland to get chocolate for Whitebeard's chocolate fondue fountain, but Odlulu wants to create the largest chocolate sculpture in Switzerland, so she uses the Vacuum Key to steal all chocolate in Switzerland and create a mountain of Odlulu-horn. Waldo and Wenda must take to the slopes to stop her plot and save Switzerland's chocolate before it all melts. Guest stars: Yuri Lowenthal as Constable, Candi Milo as Kindly Woman, Tara Platt as Tour Guide, Wolfie Trausch as Sebastien; Wanderer key: Vacuum Key
20	20	"A Wanderer's Christmas"	Various places	Seth Kearsley	F.M. De Marco & John Tellegen	December 7, 2019
When the Wanderers discover that the presents have not being delivered last night, they go on a mission to wander back in time and save Christmas. Waldo and Wenda find out that Odlulu accidentally ruined the holidays for everyone while trying to do good things in order to get off the naughty list. Odlulu and Fritz then team up with the Wanderers to fix the holiday traditions and help Santa Claus deliver presents. Guest stars: Chris Sullivan as Santa Claus, Cassandra Morris as Merry, Ethan Jones as Stefan, Michael-Leon Wooley as Tinsel, Nesta Cooper & Mark McKinney; Wanderer key: Tick-Tock Key

=== Season 2 (2020–21) ===
No. overall	No. in season	Title	Location	Directed by	Written by	Original release date
21	1	"It's on Like Amazon!"	Amazon River, Brazil	Murray Debus	Sam Cherington	July 15, 2020
Waldo and Wenda go on a mission to return the borrowed Quick Bloom Key to its owner, an Amazon-dwelling wizard named Vinebeard, but Fritz steals the magic key from Waldo for Odlulu so she can use it for her lemonade stand. The Wanderers and their friend Apua have to get a key back from Odlulu. Guest stars: Nathan Arenas as Apua, Carlos Alazraqui as Wizard Vinebeard; Wanderer key: Quick Bloom Key
22	2	"Mumbai Dance Party"	Mumbai, India	Seung Cha & Murray Debus	Sam Cherington	July 15, 2020
Waldo, Wenda and Wizard Whitebeard visit a fellow wizard to take part in a big Bollywood dance number, but Odlulu uses the Follow the Leader Key to zap everyone to follow her every move and plots to destroy Wizard Odissi's reputation. The Wanderers have to stop her plot and save Odissi's movie before it is too late. Guest stars: Zehra Fazal as Film Director, Hannah Simone as Wizard Odissi, Amir Talai as Ajay; Wanderer key: Follow The Leader Key
23	3	"Riddle Me This, Egypt"	Egypt	Scooter Tidwell	Lucas Mills	July 15, 2020
Waldo and Wenda help Wizard Dustybeard on his latest archaeology expedition to search for the Lost Chamber of Magic Keys. Odlulu and Fritz are on their tail and steal the magic key from Waldo to obtain the chamber of magic keys. The Wanderers have to navigate a hidden pyramid full of tricks and traps in order to get the key back from Odlulu before it is too late. Guest stars: Phil LaMarr as Riddle Key, Cedric Yarbrough as Wizard Dustybeard; Wanderer key: Riddle Key
24	4	"Mad About Madagascar"	Madagascar	Lianne Hughes	Sam Cherington	July 15, 2020
The Wanderers travel to Madagascar to get fresh vanilla for Wizard Flambe. Odlulu is already there, using the Bouncy-Bounce Key to build an ice cream parlor up in a Baobab tree. When Woof playfully takes a key and starts a game of catch-me-if-you-can, they must stop him before he turns a whole island into one bouncy place. Guest stars: Sumalee Montano as Wizard Flambe, Danielle Pinnock as Cake Vendor; Wanderer key: Bouncy-Bounce Key
25	5	"Norway Out"	Oslo, Norway	Seth Kearsley	John Tellegen	July 15, 2020
Odlulu plans to obtain the Wind Key so she can use it as the world's greatest hair dryer, but the Wind Key is too powerful for her to handle, so Waldo, Wenda and Whitebeard head to Norway to locate the key before Odlulu can find it. Guest stars: Grace Kaufman as Frida, Fred Tatasciore as Viking; Wanderer key: Wind Key
26	6	"Shadows of Bali"	Bali, Indonesia	Scooter Tidwell	F.M. De Marco	July 15, 2020
Waldo and Wenda head to Bali and see shadow puppets at Wizard Shadowbeard's show, but Odlulu uses the Shadow Puppet Key to unleash everyone's shadows and plots to destroy Shadowbeard's reputation. When Shadow Odlulu and her mischievous shadows run off with a magic key, the Wanderers and Odlulu learn the only way to reattach the shadows is to touch them by retrieving the key. Guest stars: Evan Kishiyama as Darma, Randall Park as Wizard Shadowbeard, additional voices: Jennie Kwan & Yuri Lowenthal; Wanderer key: Shadow Puppet Key
27	7	"Where's Woof?"	Various places	Ricky Santana	F.M. De Marco and John Tellegen	August 20, 2020
When Woof goes into the magic suitcase after he is warned not to play with that, Waldo and Wenda use the old Wander Trunk to launch an international search for their happily wandering puppy while Odlulu, Fritz, and other wanderers help them find Woof and retrieve a magic suitcase. Guest Stars: Eric Bauza as Bruce, Kerri Kenney-Silver as Wizard Lariat, Candace Kozak as Shila, Retta as Wizard Nightingale, "Weird Al" Yankovic as Wizard Artbeard; Wanderer key: Super Duper Snooper Key
28	8	"Jolly Olde England"	London, England, UK	Ricky Santana	F.M. De Marco	August 20, 2020
When Odlulu and Fritz use the Key in the Stone to summon a medieval castle in the middle of modern-day England, the Wanderers must stop King Fritz and his knights from stealing people's food in London before they turn this location upside down. Guest Stars: James Mathis III as Knight Captain & Mark McKinney as Merlin; Wanderer key: Key in the Stone
29	9	"Galapagos a Go-Go"	Galapagos Island	Seth Kearsley	Lucas Mills	August 20, 2020
Odlulu uses the Become an Animal Key to transform into an animal and search for treasure, but she accidentally disrupts the animal population on the Galapagos Island. Waldo, Wenda, Edmund and Hillary must protect the Baby Turtles before she causes trouble on them. Guest Stars: Corina Boettger as Hillary & Ely Henry as Edmund; Wanderer key: Become an Animal Key
30	10	"Toddle-Lu, Mexico City"	Mexico City, Mexico	Scooter Tidwell	Sam Cherington	August 20, 2020
Odlulu wants her own quinceanera, the traditional Mexican celebration of a birthday, but her Grow-Up Key backfires and turns her into a toddler. Waldo and Wenda try to get Odlulu back to her normal age. Guest Stars: Carlos Alazraqui as Detector Voice & Christian Lanz as Referee; Wanderer key: Grow Up Key
31	11	"Mongolia-Saurus"	Mongolia	Scooter Tidwell	John Tellegen	August 20, 2020
After Odlulu and Fritz steal the fossil collection by using the Dino Key to revive the dinosaurs as ultimate pets, the Wanderers help Wizard Amber use her dino knowledge to wrangle these prehistoric animals. When a scary Tarbosaurus attacks through the desert and chases Waldo, it is up to Wenda and Amber to save the day. Guest Stars: Nichole Sakura as Wizard Amber; Wanderer key: Dino Key
32	12	"Nepal: Yeti or Not"	Nepal	Seth Kearsley	Stacey Greenberger	August 20, 2020
When a yeti is spotted chasing away all the locals, the Wanderers investigate, but soon discover that it is one of Odlulu's plans. They must work with Wizard Rockybeard to stop Odlulu and Yeti-Fritz from trying to steal his Secret Cave of Keys. Guest Stars: Rob Riggle as Wizard Rockybeard, additional voices: Grey Griffin & Yuri Lowenthal; Wanderer key: Furball Key
33	13	"A Welsh Trick and Treat"	Wales, UK	Seth Kearsley	Jordan Gershowitz	August 20, 2020
It is Halloween time and the Wanderers get a mysterious invitation to Wales, where Dr. Odlulu chooses the haunted castle and use the Haunted House Key to bring the decorations alive to scare them. When Dracula steals the magic key to bring his monster crew alive, the Wanderers, Odlulu and Fritz have to work together and save Wales. Guest Stars: Nicolas Cantu as Rhys, Chris Parnell as Dracula; Wanderer key: Haunted House Key
34	14	"Uh-Oh, Canada"	Quebec, Canada	Ricky Santana	F.M. De Marco	December 11, 2020
The Wanderers visit Blizzardbeard for the Wanderers Ice Hockey Tournament. When Odlulu uses the Invisibility Key on herself and Fritz to become an invisible and cheating in ice hockey, Waldo and Wenda pursue Invisible Odlulu to stop her plot and retrieve the magic key. Guest Stars: Mike Emrick as Announcer, Tom Kenny as Wizard Blizzardbeard, Melanie Minichino as Molly & Noora, Kamali Minter as Chantal & Stina, Amir Talai as Guy; Wanderer key: Invisible Key
35	15	"Blue Moon Over Argentina"	Buenos Aires, Argentina	Seth Kearsley	John Tellegen	December 11, 2020
Waldo, Wenda and Wizard Whitebeard head to Argentina and visit a fellow wizard named Melodia. When Odlulu steals the Guitar Key from Wizard Melodia to be the best guitar player, the Wanderers have to get the key back from her before she wins the Battle of the Bands. Guest Stars: Stephanie Beatriz as Wizard Melodia, Rogelio Ramos as Martin, Genesis Rodriguez as Claudia, additional voices: Ashley Bornancin, Phil LaMarr, Yuri Lowenthal; Wanderer key: Guitar Key
36	16	"Once Upon a Time in Denmark"	Denmark	Seth Kearsley	F.M. De Marco	December 11, 2020
When Odlulu steals Hans Christian Andersen storybook by using the Fairy Tale Key to pull fairy tale characters from their stories into the real world Copenhagen, Waldo and Wenda head to Denmark to return the characters where they belong. When the evil Snow Queen traps Odlulu and steals a magic key, the Wanderers and Fritz have to rescue her and save his friendship with Odlulu. Guest Stars: Kelli Jordan as Storyteller, Mae Whitman as Thumbelina, Laraine Newman as Snow Queen, Wolfie Trausch, Piotr Michael & Yuri Lowenthal as Princes, Melanie Minichino as Princess, additional voices: Carlos Alazraqui; Wanderer key: Fairy Tale Key
37	17	"Baa-Baa for Now, New Zealand"	Auckland, New Zealand	Ricky Santana	Sam Cherington	December 11, 2020
The Wanderers head to New Zealand and help Wizard Corriedale try to win the sheep herding competition while Odlulu uses the Magnet Key to enter Fritz in it and successfully cheating to win the trophy. While the Wanderers try to fix the winner situation, a magic key loses control of the sheep and the Wanderers are unable to expose Odlulu's cheating when the competition is over, so they, Odlulu and Fritz have to work together to herd the sheep and save New Zealand by retrieving the key. Guest Stars: Phil LaMarr as Announcer, Cheri Oteri as Wizard Corriedale; Wanderer key: Magnet Key
38	18	"Trolling Through Iceland"	Reykjavík, Iceland	Scooter Tidwell	Sam Cheringtom	December 11, 2020
When Odlulu uses a Wake-A-Troll Key to bring two mythical creatures to life and orders them to steal things she likes, Waldo and Wenda head to Iceland to use their wits and Icelandic troll knowledge to turn the creatures back to rock. When Helka and Oliver refuse to get along and the magic key backfires, the Wanderers and Odlulu have to save Iceland and get the two sibling trolls back together so they can get along and retrieve a key for them. Guest Stars: Lauren Ash as Helka, Colton Dunn as Oliver, Tara Platt as Pylsur Vendor; Wanderer key: Wake-A-Troll Key
39	19	"Gibraltar Rocks!"	Gibraltar	Ricky Santana	F.M. De Marco & John Tellegen	December 11, 2020
Waldo and Wenda head to the WWS Great Magic Key Vault to find Whitebeard a key for his birthday. After Odlulu and Fritz steal the Great Magic Key Vault of Keys, the Wanderers must round up all the keys and stop her plot in time for Whitebeard's surprise birthday party. Guest Stars: Henry Winkler as Wizard Longbeard, additional voices: James Mathis III; Wanderer key: Great Magic Key Vault of Keys
40	20	"Flipping for Japan"	Tokyo, Japan	Scooter Tidwell	Sam Cherington	July 3, 2021
Waldo, Wenda and Wizard Whitebeard return to Japan for the big Wanderer gymnastics competition. After Odlulu and Fritz use the Flippety Key to become ace gymnasts, the Wanderers go on a mad chase to stop them before they cheat to win a gold medal. Guest Stars: Ashley Bornancin as Sofia, Ellen Wong as Yumi; Wanderer key: Flippety Key

== Production ==
Where's Waldo? was in the production of DreamWorks Animation Television in 2018. The series debuted on Universal Kids along with eight other DreamWorks Animation series, premiering on July 20, 2019. A UK version of the show with the name Where's Wally? was produced in which James Cartmell voiced Wally/Waldo.

== Broadcast ==
Where's Waldo? aired on Universal Kids in the United States, but the series moved to Peacock in 2020. The series also premiered in British in 2020: on Sky Kids in United Kingdom on March 2 and Sky One on April 4. The same year, the first 12 episodes of Where's Waldo? premiered first on the DreamWorks Channel in Southeast Asia (specifically for Hong Kong, Indonesia, Malaysia, Maldives, Myanmar, the Philippines, Pakistan, Singapore, South Korea, and Taiwan). In 2021, the series premiered in Italian on Amazon Prime Video in Italy, in Spanish on Clan in Spain, in German on Super RTL in Germany and in English on e.tv in South Africa.
