= Where's Waldo? The Fantastic Journey (video game) =

2009 video game

Where's Waldo? The Fantastic Journey (US) Where's Wally? The Fantastic Journey (UK)
- Developer: Ludia
- Publishers: Ubisoft; Microsoft Game Studios (GFWL)
- Platforms: Nintendo DS, Wii, Microsoft Windows, iPhone, WiiWare
- Release: September 22, 2009
- Genre: Puzzle adventure
- Modes: Single-player, multiplayer

Where's Waldo? The Fantastic Journey, known as Where's Wally? The Fantastic Journey in the United Kingdom, is a video game published by Ubisoft and developed by Ludia based on the book of the same name. It is a puzzle adventure game released for the Nintendo DS, Wii, Microsoft Windows, and the iPhone, and is also a remake of The Great Waldo Search, released in 1992.

== Gameplay ==
Like the other games in the series, the object of the game is to search for hidden characters and items within a time limit. Hints are awarded to the player through Woof, Waldo's pet dog. Woof alerts the players when they are near an object they are searching for. Players wanting to use this ability more often must collect 'Woof Bones' to prolong the effect.

Unlike the NES video game adaptation of Where's Waldo? and The Great Waldo Search, which relied on a directional pad to search for targets, this game allows players to utilize superior pointer-based motion controls (the Wii Remote's infrared sensor, the DS and iPhone's touchscreen, or a mouse, depending on the platform) to easily seek desired search targets.
