= Where's Wally? (book) =

1987 children's book

- First edition
- Author: Martin Handford
- Illustrator: Martin Handford
- Language: English
- Subject: Where's Wally?
- Publisher: UK: Walker Books; US: Little Brown & Co, then Candlewick Press
- Publication date: 25 June 1987
- Publication place: United Kingdom
- Media type: Print (hardback)
- Pages: 26
- ISBN: 0-316-34293-9
- OCLC: 15109312
- LC Class: PZ7.H1918 Wh 1987

Where's Wally?, published in the United States and Canada as Where's Waldo?, is the title of the first book in the Where's Wally? series, published on 25 June 1987.

In the book, Wally travels to everyday places, where he sends postcards to the reader (which are the pictures in the book), and the reader must locate Wally in the postcard.

The book became an instant best-seller.

Where's Wally? was re-released in October 1997 in a special 10th anniversary edition form.

The location of Wally was changed in each picture and additional characters were added for the reader to find (Woof, Wizard Whitebeard, Wenda, Odlaw, the Wally Watchers, and others).

The Wally series is evocative of an earlier children's book titled Where's Wallace? (by Hilary Knight), in which a red-headed orangutan escapes from the zoo and "hides" in highly detailed picture panoramas, including a beach, department store, circus, stadium, and museum.

== Scenes ==
1. In Town
2. On the Beach
3. Ski Slopes
4. Camp Site
5. The Railway Station
6. Airport
7. Sports Stadium
8. Museum
9. At Sea
10. Safari Park
11. Department Store
12. Fairground

== Controversy ==
In March 1993, Springs Public School in Long Island, New York banned Where's Wally from the school library due to a parent's complaint that a topless woman can be seen sunbathing in the upper right corner of the "On the Beach" scene. Since then numerous other schools and libraries have also banned the book, and it ranks #87 on the American Library Association's list of the most frequently challenged books of the 1990s. In the 1997 special edition re-release of the book, the beach scene was slightly edited and the topless woman is wearing a bikini top.
