= The Great Waldo Search (video game) =

1992 video game

- SNES cover art
- Developer: Radiance
- Publisher: THQ
- Platforms: Super NES, NES, Genesis
- Release: NA: 1992
- Genre: Puzzle
- Mode: Single-player

The Great Waldo Search is a video game released in 1992. It is based on the third Waldo book, which was originally released under the same name in North America.

== Gameplay ==
The pictures are slightly animated images of Waldo scenes, and the player has to scroll along the long picture to survey the scape while searching for Waldo and other objects. The directional buttons control a magnifying glass and is used in order to "find" objects. Waldo's dog Woof is also in each level and by finding him the player gets to play a small bonus game to collect points while controlling Woof on a flying carpet.

=== Levels ===
1. The Carpet Flyers
2. The Underground Hunters
3. The Battling Monks
4. The Unfriendly Giants
5. The Land of Waldos

== Development ==
=== Super NES credits ===
- Programming: William B. Norris IV
- Production: Philip Ho, Doug Braun
- Art: Wendy Salin, Mike Mangano, Kevin Kirk, Maurice Morgan, Steve Jasper, Melanie Seghetti
- Music: Doug Brandon
- Executive producer: Howard Phillips

== Legacy ==
Almost two decades later, in 2009, a remake of the game was developed by Ludia and published by Ubisoft on iOS, Microsoft Windows, and seventh-generation Nintendo systems, the Wii and the Nintendo DS, under the title Where's Waldo? The Fantastic Journey. The remake especially takes advantage of superior pointer-based motion controls to easily locate search targets and supports versus multiplayer. The motion controls are only included in the Wii version.
