= Where's Wally? The Great Picture Hunt! =

Book by Martin Handford

- American edition
- Author: Martin Handford
- Illustrator: Martin Handford
- Language: English
- Subject: Where's Wally?
- Publisher: Walker Books (UK); Candlewick Press (US)
- Publication date: 1 May 2006
- Publication place: United Kingdom
- Media type: Print (hardback)
- Pages: 26
- ISBN: 0-7636-3043-8
- OCLC: 67711496
- LC Class: PZ7.H1918 Whdg 2006

Where's Wally? The Great Picture Hunt! was released in May 2006. In the book Wally, Wizard Whitebeard, Wenda, Woof and Odlaw travel to fantasy worlds. The book is the sixth in the Where's Wally? series and the first in nine years.

== Scenes ==
1. Exhibit 1 – Odlaw's Picture Pandemonium
2. Exhibit 2 – A Sporting Life
3. Exhibit 3 – Brown Sailors And Green Scalers
4. Exhibit 4 – Brown Sailors And Green Scalers Again
5. Exhibit 5 – The Pink Paradise Party
6. Exhibit 6 – Old Friends
7. Exhibit 7 – Old Friends Again
8. Exhibit 8 – A Monster Masterpiece
9. Exhibit 9 – WallyWorld
10. Exhibit 10 – WallyWorld Again
11. Exhibit 11 – Pirate Panorama
12. Exhibit 12 – The Great Portrait Exhibition
