= Walker Books =

British publisher of children's books

- Parent company: Trustbridge Global Media
- Founded: 1978
- Founders: Sebastian Walker, Amelia Edwards & Wendy Boase
- Country of origin: United Kingdom
- Headquarters location: London
- Distribution: The Book Service (UK); Harper Entertainment Distribution Services (Australia); Pan Macmillan (South Africa)
- Publication types: Books
- Imprints: Candlewick Press; Walker Books Australia
- Official website: www.walker.co.uk www.walkerbooks.com.au

Walker Books is a British publisher of children's books, founded in 1978 by Sebastian Walker, Amelia Edwards, and Wendy Boase.

In 1991, the success of Walker Books' Where's Wally? series enabled the company to expand into the American market, starting a sister company called Candlewick Press in 1991. In 1993, Walker Books also entered the Australian market by establishing another sister company, Walker Books Australia.

In 2001, co-founder of Walker Books Amelia Edwards won the Eleanor Farjeon Award for her contributions to children's literature as the publisher's art director.

The company's logo of a bear holding a candle was designed by Helen Oxenbury.

In 2020, the company was acquired by Trustbridge Global Media, together with its sister company in the US Candlewick Press and its other subsidiary in Australia.

== Publications ==
- Jet Smoke and Dragon Fire (1991), written by Charles Ashton, illustrated by Wayne Anderson
