= Martin Handford =

British children's author and illustrator

- Born: September 27, 1956 (age 69); London, England
- Occupations: Children's author and illustrator
- Years active: 1986–present

Signature
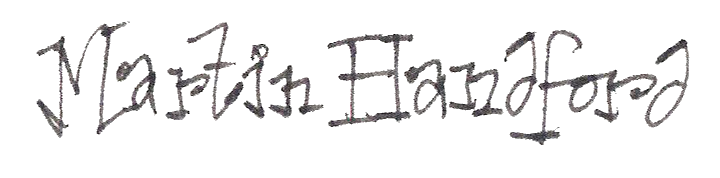

Martin Handford (born 27 September 1956) is an English children's author and illustrator from London who gained worldwide fame in the mid-1980s for his Where's Wally? book series (known as Where's Waldo? in North America).

== Early life ==
Born in London, Handford was a solitary child to divorced parents. He began drawing when he was about 5 years old, using stick figures on paper to recreate crowded battle scenes that he witnessed in films such as The Alamo (1960), or drawings by Cornelius DeWitt in The Golden History of the World, Handford's favorite book. He stated, "I have always done pictures of crowds... miniature pictures with lots of activity, usually with a sense of humor." He also drew inspiration from his toy soldiers, which he frequently arranged. After school, when most other children went outside to play games, Handford drew pictures of people.

== Career ==
Handford attended art college for three years at the University for the Creative Arts (formerly known as Kent Institute of Art and Design) in Maidstone, Kent. Before his illustration career, Handford worked as an insurance agent for three years. He also took on freelance illustration work and specialised in crowd scenes, working with clients in media and advertising. He created the album cover for The Vapors' 1981 album Magnets. The cover features an assassination scene which forms the shape of an eye.

In 1986, an art director from Walker Books commissioned Handford to draw a crowd containing a hidden character with peculiar features to make readers look more closely, an idea similar to Busy Places by Philippe Dupasquier. Handford created a two-page spread that introduced "Wally", a world traveller and time travel aficionado dressed in a red and white striped shirt. Handford said in 1993 that there was "no other significance in the clothing" besides being distinctive. Wally is joined on most of his travels by his friend Wenda, who wears clothes with the same colours as Wally's, an evil character named Odlaw (Waldo spelled backwards) who dresses in yellow and black, and a dog named Woof.

Handford published his first Where's Wally? book in 1987 and earned a reputation for being a methodical and diligent worker. Each two-page sketch drawing contains hundreds or even thousands of figures and takes him as much as eight weeks to complete. The drawings are drawn to the same scale as in the books and each two-page spread usually contains at least 300 to 500 figures, with Wally often being the last character drawn into the crowd.

Handford initially felt that Wally was a trainspotter, and said "When I originally thought of the character who was lost in all these scenes, I just imagined that the reason why he was lost was because he was slightly idiotic and didn't know where he was going." In 1997, Handford expressed that Wally had changed to appear "less nerdy", and emphasized that Wally is "not idiotic. He is a cool guy. He knows where he's going. He's very open-minded. He's kind." Handford said he was hopeful that Wally was "suitably different" from other characters in children's media, stating "I think he's less violent and less macho".

=== Where's Wally? success ===
Handford produced a total of seven "classic" Where's Wally? books, and the Wally character branched out into notebooks, pillows, posters, video games and food products including "Waldo-O's" pasta and tomato sauce. Wally was the subject of a syndicated comic strip as well as two animated TV series: one in 1991 and another in 2019, the latter being retitled to Where's Waldo to cater to the American audience. Handford became a minor celebrity with the success of Where's Wally?. The Where's Wally? trademark has sold in at least 28 different countries.

The Where's Wally? books were published in the UK by Walker Books and in the United States under the title Where's Waldo? first by Little, Brown and Company before being taken on by Candlewick Press, the American subsidiary publishing company of Walker Books. The first four titles were originally printed in Italy, but they were later reprinted in China. A film based on the Where's Wally? series of books was planned for filming in 2005 by Nickelodeon Movies but was cancelled due to a management change at Paramount Pictures. In 2007, Handford sold the rights to Where's Wally? to the Entertainment Rights Group, the world's biggest independent owner of children's brands. He made £2.5 million in this sale.

== Personal life ==
"The thing was, every time we played, my role in the group diminished. The first concert, I was the lead singer. The second, I played bass. The third concert, we got a female lead singer in, and I was the backup singer to her. And at our last concert, I was the dancer — I wasn't allowed to do anything musically."
– Handford in 1990 describing the punk band he was in during art college

Handford has been noted for his privacy and avoidance of photographs.

In the early 1990s, it was reported that he lived in a home in the London suburb of Romford which he described as "a glorified art studio" and "very, very small". His drawing table filled the bedroom and relegated his bed to the living room and "thousands of books and comics and thousands of toy soldiers". At the time, Handford typically woke up at 2pm and worked on Where's Wally? through the night until 6 am. He denied press characterisations of himself as a nocturnal recluse: "I'm not; I've got very good friends". He listened to 1950s audio tapes of The Phil Silvers Show while he worked, and explained "They really boost my morale". He said in 1990, "If I'm not working on my pictures, I get very fidgety and bored."

In the early 1990s, he married an artist, Elizabeth, and they had a son and a daughter in the following years. Similarities between Handford and Wally have been frequently noted, with both sharing a long chin, prominent glasses, distinct smile, polite nature, and a penchant for reading and observing. Handford has claimed that the supposed resemblances are coincidental. Unlike Wally, Handford dislikes crowded places and rarely travels.

Though Where's Wally? avoids depictions of violence, Handford said "It doesn't mean I'm oblivious to the actual savagery that a lot of mankind has been capable of". Handford stated, "My only regret in life is I would love to have been in a pop group. Seriously." He was in a punk band during art school and describes the group as "quite obnoxious". In 1990, The New York Times reported that he had "no desire for a bigger house, and spends most of his money on art supplies, illustrated books, old comics, and still more toy soldiers."
