= List of Ubisoft games: 2000–2009 =

Go to: 2000 | 2001 | 2002 | 2003 | 2004 | 2005 | 2006 | 2007 | 2008 | 2009

Title	Platform(s)	Release date	Developer(s)	Ref.
2000
Papyrus	Game Boy Color	February 2000	Planet Interactive Development	
Theocracy	Linux	March 1, 2000	Philos Laboratories	
Theocracy	Microsoft Windows	March 1, 2000	Philos Laboratories	
Inspector Gadget: Operation Madkactus	Game Boy Color	March 14, 2000	RFX Interactive	
Rayman 2: The Great Escape	Dreamcast	March 21, 2000	Ubi Soft	
Business Tycoon	Microsoft Windows	March 25, 2000	Stardock Entertainment	
Rayman	Game Boy Color	March 2000	Ubi Soft Milan	
Disney's Dinosaur	Game Boy Color	May 9, 2000	Digital Eclipse	
Evolution 2: Far off Promise	Dreamcast	June 30, 2000	Sting	
All Star Tennis 2000	Microsoft Windows	June 2000	Aqua Pacific	
Toonsylvania	Game Boy Color	June 2000	RFX Interactive	
Surf Riders	PlayStation	August 10, 2000	ACOT	
Deep Fighter	Dreamcast	August 23, 2000	Criterion Games	
Infestation	Microsoft Windows	September 1, 2000	Frontier Developments	
Infestation	PlayStation	September 1, 2000	Frontier Developments	
O'Leary Manager 2000	Game Boy Color	September 15, 2000	LiveMedia UK	
Rayman 2: The Great Escape	PlayStation	September 16, 2000	Ubi Soft	
F1 Racing Championship	PlayStation	September 26, 2000	Ubi Soft Shanghai	
Deep Fighter	Microsoft Windows	September 29, 2000	Criterion Games	
Carl Lewis Athletics 2000	Game Boy Color	September 2000	Planet Interactive Development	
In Cold Blood	Microsoft Windows	October 10, 2000	Revolution Software	
Virtual Skipper	Microsoft Windows	October 18, 2000	Duran	
Batman Beyond: Return of the Joker	PlayStation	October 30, 2000	Kemco	
Disney's Donald Duck: Goin' Quackers	Game Boy Color	October 2000	Ubi Soft Milan	
Walt Disney's The Jungle Book: Rhythm n' Groove	Microsoft Windows	November 1, 2000	Ubi Soft Montreal	
Gold and Glory: The Road to El Dorado	Microsoft Windows	November 8, 2000	Revolution Software	
Disney's Aladdin	Game Boy Color	November 10, 2000	Crawfish Interactive	
F1 Racing Championship	Game Boy Color	November 10, 2000	Ubi Soft Milan	
Walt Disney's The Jungle Book: Mowgli's Wild Adventure	Game Boy Color	November 14, 2000	Ubi Soft Milan	
Batman Beyond: Return of the Joker	Game Boy Color	November 15, 2000	Kemco	
Disney's Donald Duck: Goin' Quackers	PlayStation	November 15, 2000	Ubi Soft Shanghai	
Tom Clancy's Rainbow Six: Rogue Spear	Microsoft Windows	November 27, 2000	Red Storm Entertainment	
Tom Clancy's Rainbow Six: Rogue Spear Mission Pack - Urban Operations	Microsoft Windows	November 29, 2000	Red Storm Entertainment	
Disney's Dinosaur	Dreamcast	November 24, 2000	Ubi Soft Paris	
Batman Beyond: Return of the Joker	Nintendo 64	December 1, 2000	Kemco	
Grandia II	Dreamcast	December 5, 2000	Game Arts	
POD SpeedZone	Dreamcast	December 6, 2000	Ubi Soft Bucharest	
F1 Racing Championship	Nintendo 64	December 8, 2000	Ubi Soft Paris	
Walt Disney's The Jungle Book: Rhythm n' Groove	PlayStation	December 8, 2000	Ubi Soft Shanghai	
Disney's Donald Duck: Goin' Quackers	Nintendo 64	December 8, 2000	Ubi Soft Casablanca	
Disney's Donald Duck: Goin' Quackers	Dreamcast	December 14, 2000	Ubi Soft Casablanca	
Disney's Donald Duck: Goin' Quackers	PlayStation 2	December 21, 2000	Ubi Soft Montreal	
Rayman 2 Forever	Game Boy Color	December 14, 2000	Ubi Soft Milan	
Tokyo Xtreme Racer 2	Dreamcast	December 14, 2000	Genki	
Gold and Glory: The Road to El Dorado	PlayStation	December 20, 2000	Revolution Software	
Disney's The Emperor's New Groove	Game Boy Color	December 2000	Sandbox Studios	
Eternal Ring	PlayStation 2	December 22, 2000	FromSoftware	
Little Nicky	Game Boy Color	December 15, 2000	Digital Eclipse	
Arcatera: The Dark Brotherhood	Microsoft Windows	2000	Westka Interactive	
All Star Tennis 2000	Game Boy Color	2000	Smart Dog	
All Star Tennis 2000	PlayStation	2000	Aqua Pacific	
Amazing Learning Games with Rayman	PlayStation	2000	Ubi Soft, Aqua Pacific	
Anne McCaffrey's Freedom: First Resistance	Microsoft Windows	December 12, 2000	Red Storm Entertainment	
Animorphs	Game Boy Color	November 7, 2000	Run and Gun!	
David O'Leary's Total Soccer 2000	Game Boy Color	2000	LiveMedia UK	
Disney's Dinosaur	Microsoft Windows	December 15, 2000	Ubi Soft Paris	
Disney's Donald Duck: Goin' Quackers	Microsoft Windows	2000	Ubi Soft Casablanca	
F1 Racing Championship	Dreamcast	2000	Ubi Soft	
Grandia	PlayStation	2000	Game Arts	
Papyrus: Le Secret de la Cité Perdue	Microsoft Windows	2000	Ubi Soft	
Princesse Sissi et Tempête	Microsoft Windows	2000	CinéGroupe Interactive	
Pro Rally 2001	Microsoft Windows	2000	Ubi Soft Barcelona	
Rayman Revolution	PlayStation 2	2000	Ubi Soft Annecy	
Sea Dogs	Microsoft Windows	2000	Sea Dog	
Spirou: The Robot Invasion	Game Boy Color	2000	Planet Interactive Development	
Suzuki Alstare Extreme Racing	Microsoft Windows	2000	Criterion Games	
The Mask of Zorro	Game Boy Color	2000	Saffire	
Tom and Jerry in Fists of Furry	Microsoft Windows	2000	VIS Entertainment	
Tom and Jerry in Fists of Furry	Nintendo 64	2000	VIS Entertainment	
Tonic Trouble	Game Boy Color	2000	RFX Interactive	
2001
Sno-Cross Championship Racing	PlayStation	January 12, 2001	Unique Development Studios	
Stupid Invaders	Mac OS	February 5, 2001	Xilam Animation	
Stupid Invaders	Microsoft Windows	February 22, 2001	Xilam Animation	
Disney's Dinosaur	PlayStation 2	February 2001	Ubi Soft Montreal	
F1 Racing Championship	Microsoft Windows	March 22, 2001	Ubi Soft Paris	
F1 Racing Championship	PlayStation 2	March 22, 2001	Ubi Soft Paris	
Armored Core 2	PlayStation 2	March 23, 2001	FromSoftware	
The Settlers IV	Microsoft Windows	April 4, 2001	Blue Byte	
Flipper & Lopaka	Game Boy Color	April 13, 2001	Planet Interactive Entertainment	
Batman: Chaos in Gotham	Game Boy Color	April 17, 2001	Digital Eclipse	
Myst III: Exile	Mac OS	May 7, 2001	Presto Studios	
Myst III: Exile	Microsoft Windows	May 7, 2001	Presto Studios	
Conflict Zone	Microsoft Windows	May 25, 2001	Mathématiques Appliquées	
Eurofighter Typhoon	Microsoft Windows	May 2001	Digital Image Design, Rage Games	
Hype: The Time Quest	Game Boy Color	May 2001	Planet Interactive Entertainment	
Rayman Advance	Game Boy Advance	June 11, 2001	Digital Eclipse	
Stupid Invaders	Dreamcast	June 29, 2001	Titanium Studios	
Europa Universalis	Microsoft Windows	June 2001	Paradox Development Studio	
Roswell Conspiracies: Aliens, Myths & Legends	Game Boy Color	June 2001	Crawfish Interactive	
Moderngroove: Ministry of Sound Edition	PlayStation 2	July 13, 2001	ModernGroove Entertainment	
V.I.P.	Game Boy Color	July 2001	Planet Interactive Entertainment	
Dragon Riders: Chronicles of Pern	Dreamcast	August 7, 2001	Ubi Studios UK	
Dragon Riders: Chronicles of Pern	Microsoft Windows	August 7, 2001	Ubi Studios UK	
Conquest: Frontier Wars	Microsoft Windows	August 18, 2001	Fever Pitch Studios	
Planet of the Apes	Microsoft Windows	September 19, 2001	Visiware	
Final Fight	Game Boy Advance	September 27, 2001	Capcom	
Pool of Radiance: Ruins of Myth Drannor	Microsoft Windows	September 27, 2001	Stormfront Studios	
Evil Twin: Cyprien's Chronicles	Microsoft Windows	October 4, 2001	In Utero	
Batman: Vengeance	PlayStation 2	October 16, 2001	Ubi Soft Montreal	
Kohan: Immortal Sovereigns	Microsoft Windows	October 16, 2001	TimeGate Studios	
Tom Clancy's Rainbow Six: Rogue Spear - Black Thorn	Microsoft Windows	October 17, 2001	Red Storm Entertainment	
Gadget Tycoon	Microsoft Windows	October 23, 2001	Monte Cristo	
Sunny Garcia Surfing	PlayStation 2	October 23, 2001	Krome Studios Melbourne	
Rally Championship 2002	Microsoft Windows	November 2, 2001	Warthog Games	
Silent Hunter II	Microsoft Windows	November 7, 2001	Ultimation	
Battle Realms	Microsoft Windows	November 8, 2001	Liquid Entertainment	
The Final Cut	Microsoft Windows	November 10, 2001	Arxel Tribe	
Super Street Fighter II: Turbo Revival	Game Boy Advance	November 12, 2001	Capcom	
Conflict Zone	Dreamcast	November 13, 2001	Mathématiques Appliquées	
Tom Clancy's Ghost Recon	Microsoft Windows	November 13, 2001	Red Storm Entertainment	
Disney's Tarzan Untamed	GameCube	November 16, 2001	Ubi Soft Montreal	
Batman: Vengeance	GameCube	November 18, 2001	Ubi Soft Montreal	
IL-2 Sturmovik	Microsoft Windows	November 20, 2001	1C:Maddox Games	
Walt Disney's Snow White and the Seven Dwarfs	Game Boy Color	November 22, 2001	Planet Interactive Entertainment	
Super Bust-A-Move	Game Boy Advance	November 28, 2001	Taito	
Disney's Tarzan Untamed	PlayStation 2	November 30, 2001	Ubi Soft Montreal	
Mega Man Battle Network	Game Boy Advance	November 30, 2001	Capcom Production Studio 2	
Rayman Arena	PlayStation 2	November 30, 2001	Ubi Soft	
The Legend of Alon D'ar	PlayStation 2	December 5, 2001	Stormfront Studios	
Evil Twin: Cyprien's Chronicles	PlayStation 2	December 6, 2001	In Utero	
Batman: Vengeance	Xbox	December 10, 2001	Ubi Soft Montreal	
Breath of Fire	Game Boy Advance	December 14, 2001	Capcom	
Worms World Party	PlayStation	December 14, 2001	The Code Monkeys	
Trevor Chan's Capitalism II	Microsoft Windows	December 17, 2001	Enlight Software	
Conflict Zone	PlayStation 2	December 18, 2001	Mathématiques Appliquées	
Jade Cocoon 2	PlayStation 2	December 18, 2001	Genki	
Donald Duck Advance	Game Boy Advance	December 21, 2001	Ubi Soft Shanghai	
Rayman Arena	Microsoft Windows	December 2001	Ubi Soft	
Alex Ferguson's Player Manager 2001	PlayStation	2001	Anco Software	
Batman: Gotham City Racer	PlayStation	2001	Sinister Games	
Escape from Monkey Island	PlayStation 2	2001	LucasArts	
Gunfighter: The Legend of Jesse James	PlayStation	2001	Rebellion Developments	
Inspector Gadget: Gadget's Crazy Maze	PlayStation	2001	Light & Shadow Production, Vision Media	
Pearl Harbor: Strike at Dawn	Microsoft Windows	2001	MAUS Software	
Roswell Conspiracies: Aliens, Myths & Legends	PlayStation	2001	Red Lemon Studios	
Scrabble	Microsoft Windows	2001	Runecraft	
Scrabble	PlayStation 2	2001	Runecraft	
Taxi 2	Dreamcast	2001	Blue Sphere	
Tokyo Xtreme Racer: Zero	PlayStation 2	2001	Genki	
2002
Grandia II	PlayStation 2	January 29, 2002	Rocket Studio	
Salt Lake 2002	Game Boy Advance	January 31, 2002	DC Studios, Ubi Studios UK	
Echelon	Microsoft Windows	February 7, 2002	Madia Entertainment	
Destroyer Command	Microsoft Windows	February 12, 2002	Ultimation	
Mike Tyson Boxing	Game Boy Advance	March 1, 2002	Virtucraft	
Evolution Worlds	GameCube	March 6, 2002	Sting	
Rayman Rush	PlayStation	March 8, 2002	Ubi Soft Shanghai	
Bratz	Game Boy Advance	March 11, 2002	DC Studios	
Warlords: Battlecry II	Microsoft Windows	March 12, 2002	Strategic Studies	
Grandia II	Microsoft Windows	March 14, 2002	Game Arts	
Tom Clancy's Rainbow Six: Rogue Spear	Game Boy Advance	March 14, 2002	Ubi Soft Milan	
Bratz	PlayStation	March 18, 2002	DC Studios	
E.T. The Extra-Terrestrial: Interplanetary Mission	PlayStation	March 19, 2002	Digital Eclipse, Santa Cruz Games	
Dark Planet: Battle for Natrolis	Microsoft Windows	March 21, 2002	Creative Edge	
Jim Henson's Bear in the Big Blue House	Game Boy Advance	March 21, 2002	Ubi Studios UK	
X-Bladez: Inline Skater	PlayStation	March 22, 2002	Vision Scape Interactive	
Disney's Donald Duck: Goin' Quackers	GameCube	March 26, 2002	Ubi Soft Montreal	
Tom Clancy's Ghost Recon: Desert Siege	Microsoft Windows	March 26, 2002	Red Storm Entertainment	
E.T.: Phone Home Adventure	Microsoft Windows	March 27, 2002	Lexis Numérique	
Pro Rally 2002	PlayStation 2	March 29, 2002	Ubi Soft Barcelona	
Europa Universalis II	Microsoft Windows	April 5, 2002	Paradox Development Studio	
Hooters Road Trip	Microsoft Windows	April 25, 2002	Hoplite Research	
Hooters Road Trip	PlayStation	April 25, 2002	Hoplite Research	
Sabrina, the Teenage Witch: Potion Commotion	Game Boy Advance	April 25, 2002	Ubi Soft Montreal	
Ultimate Fighting Championship: Tapout	Xbox	April 25, 2002	DreamFactory	
Evil Twin: Cyprien's Chronicles	Dreamcast	April 26, 2002	In Utero	
Monster Jam: Maximum Destruction	PlayStation 2	May 28, 2002	Inland Productions	
The Sum of All Fears	Microsoft Windows	May 31, 2002	Red Storm Entertainment	
Taxi 2	PlayStation	May 2002	DC Studios	
UFC: Throwdown	PlayStation 2	June 3, 2002	Opus	
The Elder Scrolls III: Morrowind	Microsoft Windows	June 8, 2002	Bethesda Game Studios	
Sven-Göran Eriksson's World Manager	Microsoft Windows	June 14, 2002	Anco Software	
Taxi 2	Microsoft Windows	June 22, 2002	Blue Sphere	
Breath of Fire II	Game Boy Advance	June 28, 2002	Capcom	
Muppet Pinball Mayhem	Game Boy Advance	July 4, 2002	Digital Eclipse	
Planet of the Apes	PlayStation	July 5, 2002	Visiware	
Tom Clancy's Rainbow Six: Lone Wolf	PlayStation	July 5, 2002	Rebellion Developments, Red Storm Entertainment	
Dokapon: Monster Hunter	Game Boy Advance	July 18, 2002	Tycoon Corporation	
V.I.P.	Game Boy Advance	July 18, 2002	Planet Interactive Development	
UFC: Throwdown	GameCube	July 29, 2002	Opus	
Tiger Woods PGA Tour Golf	Game Boy Advance	August 2, 2002	Rebellion Developments	
Monster Jam: Maximum Destruction	Game Boy Advance	August 19, 2002	Unique Development Studios	
Worms Blast	GameCube	September 4, 2002	Zed Two Game Design	
Largo Winch: Empire Under Threat	Microsoft Windows	September 6, 2002	Ubi Soft Annecy	
Largo Winch: Empire Under Threat	PlayStation 2	September 6, 2002	Ubi Soft Annecy	
Chessmaster 9000	Microsoft Windows	September 10, 2002	Ubi Soft Bucharest	
Colin McRae Rally 2.0	Game Boy Advance	September 17, 2002	Spellbound Interactive	
Largo Winch: Empire Under Threat	Xbox	September 19, 2002	Ubi Soft Annecy	
Myst III: Exile	PlayStation 2	September 19, 2002	Ubi Soft Montreal	
Myst III: Exile	Xbox	September 19, 2002	Ubi Soft Montreal	
Super Bust-A-Move 2	PlayStation 2	September 19, 2002	Dreams	
The Sum of All Fears	Game Boy Advance	September 19, 2002	Red Storm Entertainment	
Rayman Arena	GameCube	September 24, 2002	Ubi Soft	
Rayman Arena	Xbox	September 24, 2002	Ubi Soft	
Tom Clancy's Ghost Recon: Island Thunder	Microsoft Windows	September 25, 2002	Red Storm Entertainment	
Worms World Party	Game Boy Advance	September 26, 2002	Fluid Studios	
Largo Winch: Empire Under Threat	GameCube	October 3, 2002	Ubi Soft Annecy	
Deathrow	Xbox	October 17, 2002	SouthEnd Interactive	
Mega Man Battle Network 2	Game Boy Advance	October 17, 2002	Capcom Production Studio 2	
Wizardry: Tale of the Forsaken Land	PlayStation 2	October 17, 2002	Racjin, Atlus	
Speed Challenge: Jacques Villeneuve's Racing Vision	GameCube	October 18, 2002	Ubi Soft Montreal, Ubi Soft Bucharest	
Speed Challenge: Jacques Villeneuve's Racing Vision	Microsoft Windows	October 18, 2002	Ubi Soft Montreal, Ubi Soft Bucharest	
The Sum of All Fears	PlayStation 2	October 25, 2002	Red Storm Entertainment	
Disney's PK: Out of the Shadows	PlayStation 2	October 30, 2002	Ubi Soft Casablanca	
Riding Champion: Legacy of Rosemond Hill	Microsoft Windows	October 2002	Digital Illusions	
Pro Rally	GameCube	November 11, 2002	Ubi Soft Barcelona	
Rocky	Xbox	November 12, 2002	Rage Games	
Tomb Raider: The Prophecy	Game Boy Advance	November 12, 2002	Ubi Soft Milan	
Tom Clancy's Ghost Recon	Xbox	November 12, 2002	Red Storm Entertainment	
Rocky	Game Boy Advance	November 14, 2002	Virtucraft Studios	
Rocky	GameCube	November 14, 2002	Steel Monkeys	
Catz 5	Microsoft Windows	November 18, 2002	Studio Mythos	
Dogz 5	Microsoft Windows	November 18, 2002	Studio Mythos	
Dragon's Lair 3D: Return to the Lair	Microsoft Windows	November 18, 2002	Dragonstone Interactive	
Dragon's Lair 3D: Return to the Lair	Xbox	November 18, 2002	Dragonstone Interactive	
Tom Clancy's Splinter Cell	Xbox	November 18, 2002	Ubi Soft Montreal	
Monster Jam: Maximum Destruction	GameCube	November 19, 2002	Ubi Soft Barcelona	
Rocky	PlayStation 2	November 19, 2002	Rage Games	
Speed Challenge: Jacques Villeneuve's Racing Vision	PlayStation 2	November 22, 2002	Ubi Soft Montreal, Ubi Soft Bucharest	
The Elder Scrolls III: Morrowind	Xbox	November 22, 2002	Bethesda Game Studios	
The Mummy	Game Boy Advance	November 22, 2002	Ubi Soft Milan	
Street Fighter Alpha 3	Game Boy Advance	November 28, 2002	Crawfish Interactive	
Disney's PK: Out of the Shadows	GameCube	November 30, 2002	Ubi Soft Casablanca	
Globetrotter 2	Microsoft Windows	November 2002	Deadline Games	
Monster Jam: Maximum Destruction	Microsoft Windows	December 3, 2002	High Voltage Software	
Super Bust-A-Move	GameCube	December 3, 2002	Taito	
RS3: Racing Simulation Three	Microsoft Windows	December 5, 2002	Ubi Soft Paris	
Tom Clancy's Ghost Recon	PlayStation 2	December 5, 2002	Ubi Soft Shanghai	
Lunar Legend	Game Boy Advance	December 8, 2002	Japan Art Media	
Jim Henson's Bear in the Big Blue House	PlayStation	December 9, 2002	DC Studios	
Bratz	Microsoft Windows	December 17, 2002	DC Studios	
Disney's Treasure Planet	Game Boy Advance	December 2002	Bizarre Creations	
Moto Racer Advance	Game Boy Advance	December 2002	Adeline Software International, Delphine Software International	
Batman: Vengeance	Microsoft Windows	2002	Ubi Soft Montreal	
E.T. The Extra-Terrestrial: Away From Home	Microsoft Windows	2002	Lexis Numérique	
Jet Ion GP	PlayStation 2	2002	Gust	
Largo Winch .// Commando SAR	PlayStation	2002	Rebellion Developments	
Moorhen 3 ...Chicken Chase	Game Boy Advance	2002	Similis Software	
Sven-Göran Eriksson's World Challenge	Microsoft Windows	2002	Anco Software	
Trains & Trucks Tycoon	Microsoft Windows	2002	Virtual X-citement	
V.I.P.	Microsoft Windows	2002	Ubi Soft Shanghai	
V.I.P.	PlayStation 2	2002	Ubi Soft Shanghai	
2003
The Sum of All Fears	GameCube	January 15, 2003	Red Storm Entertainment	
Taxi 3	Game Boy Advance	January 30, 2003	Visual Impact	
Tom Clancy's Ghost Recon	GameCube	February 12, 2003	Ubi Soft Shanghai	
Sword of the Samurai	PlayStation 2	February 13, 2003	LightWeight	
Tom Clancy's Splinter Cell	Microsoft Windows	February 18, 2003	Ubi Soft Montreal	
Wild Arms 3	PlayStation 2	February 21, 2003	Media.Vision	
IL-2 Sturmovik: Forgotten Battles	Microsoft Windows	March 3, 2003	1C:Maddox Games	
Murakumo: Renegade Mech Pursuit	Xbox	March 4, 2003	FromSoftware	
Rayman 3	Game Boy Advance	March 4, 2003	Ubi Soft	
Rayman 3: Hoodlum Havoc	GameCube	March 4, 2003	Ubi Soft	
Walt Disney's The Jungle Book: Rhythm n' Groove	PlayStation 2	March 4, 2003	Ubi Soft Montreal	
Gunfighter II: Revenge of Jesse James	PlayStation 2	March 14, 2003	Rebellion Developments	
Rayman 3: Hoodlum Havoc	PlayStation 2	March 17, 2003	Ubi Soft	
Tom Clancy's Rainbow Six 3: Raven Shield	Microsoft Windows	March 18, 2003	Red Storm Entertainment	
Rayman 3: Hoodlum Havoc	Xbox	March 19, 2003	Ubi Soft	
CSI: Crime Scene Investigation	Microsoft Windows	March 20, 2003	369 Interactive	
Shadowbane	Mac OS	March 25, 2003	Wolfpack Studios	
Shadowbane	Microsoft Windows	March 25, 2003	Wolfpack Studios	
Rayman 3: Hoodlum Havoc	Microsoft Windows	March 26, 2003	Ubi Soft	
Tom Clancy's Splinter Cell	PlayStation 2	April 9, 2003	Ubi Soft Shanghai	
Tom Clancy's Splinter Cell	GameCube	April 11, 2003	Ubi Soft Shanghai	
Tom Clancy's Splinter Cell	Game Boy Advance	April 25, 2003	Ubi Soft Montreal	
Chessmaster	PlayStation 2	June 2, 2003	Ubi Soft Bucharest	
Will Rock	Microsoft Windows	June 9, 2003	Saber Interactive	
Ape Escape 2	PlayStation 2	July 1, 2003	Japan Studio	
Pirates of the Caribbean (video game)	Microsoft Windows	July 8, 2003	Akella	
Charlie's Angels	GameCube	July 9, 2003	Neko Entertainment	
Charlie's Angels	PlayStation 2	July 9, 2003	Neko Entertainment	
Tom Clancy's Ghost Recon: Island Thunder	Xbox	August 5, 2003	Red Storm Entertainment	
Crouching Tiger, Hidden Dragon	PlayStation 2	October 9, 2003	Lightweight	
RS3: Racing Simulation Three	PlayStation 2	October 9, 2003	Ubisoft Paris	
XIII	Microsoft Windows	October 9, 2003	Ubisoft Paris	
Crouching Tiger, Hidden Dragon	Game Boy Advance	October 14, 2003	Ubisoft Shanghai	
Batman: Rise of Sin Tzu	PlayStation 2	October 16, 2003	Ubisoft Montreal	
Batman: Rise of Sin Tzu	Xbox	October 16, 2003	Ubisoft Montreal	
In Memoriam	Mac OS	October 16, 2003	Lexis Numérique	
In Memoriam	Microsoft Windows	October 16, 2003	Lexis Numérique	
Warlords IV: Heroes of Etheria	Microsoft Windows	October 21, 2003	Infinite Interactive	
Prince of Persia: The Sands of Time	Game Boy Advance	October 28, 2003	Ubisoft Montreal	
XIII	PlayStation 2	October 28, 2003	Ubisoft Paris	
Tom Clancy's Rainbow Six 3	Xbox	November 1, 2003	Ubisoft Montreal	
XIII	Xbox	November 6, 2003	Ubisoft Paris	
Batman: Rise of Sin Tzu	GameCube	November 11, 2003	Ubisoft Montreal	
Beyond Good & Evil	PlayStation 2	November 11, 2003	Ubisoft Pictures	
Uru: Ages Beyond Myst	Microsoft Windows	November 11, 2003	Cyan Worlds	
Saddle Up: Time to Ride	Microsoft Windows	November 13, 2003	Lexis Numérique	
Mucha Lucha! Mascaritas of the Lost Code	Game Boy Advance	November 18, 2003	Digital Eclipse	
Prince of Persia: The Sands of Time	GameCube	November 18, 2003	Ubisoft Montreal	
Prince of Persia: The Sands of Time	PlayStation 2	November 18, 2003	Ubisoft Montreal	
Prince of Persia: The Sands of Time	Xbox	November 18, 2003	Ubisoft Montreal	
Beyond Good & Evil	Microsoft Windows	November 19, 2003	Ubisoft Pictures	
Lock On: Modern Air Combat	Microsoft Windows	November 20, 2003	Eagle Dynamics	
Monster 4x4: Masters of Metal	PlayStation 2	November 25, 2003	Ubisoft Barcelona	
XIII	GameCube	November 25, 2003	Ubisoft Paris	
Biathlon 2004	Microsoft Windows	November 28, 2003	Geronimo Entertainment	
Prince of Persia: The Sands of Time	Microsoft Windows	December 2, 2003	Ubisoft Montreal	
Beyond Good & Evil	Xbox	December 2, 2003	Ubisoft Pictures	
Crouching Tiger, Hidden Dragon	Xbox	December 9, 2003	Lightweight	
Monster 4x4: Masters of Metal	GameCube	December 9, 2003	Ubisoft Barcelona	
Beyond Good & Evil	GameCube	December 10, 2003	Ubisoft Pictures	
Downtown Run	GameCube	2003	Ubisoft Bucharest	
Downtown Run	PlayStation 2	2003	Ubisoft Bucharest	
Downtown Run	Xbox	2003	Ubisoft Bucharest	
Scrabble: 2003 Edition	Xbox	2003	Runecraft	
TOCA: World Touring Cars	Game Boy Advance	2003	Spellbound Interactive	
2004
Baldur's Gate: Dark Alliance	Game Boy Advance	February 5, 2004	Magic Pockets	
Scrabble: 2003 Edition	PlayStation 2	February 27, 2004	Runecraft	
Tom Clancy's Rainbow Six 3: Athena Sword	Microsoft Windows	March 9, 2004	Ubisoft Italy	
Tom Clancy's Rainbow Six 3	PlayStation 2	March 16, 2004	Ubisoft Shanghai	
Tom Clancy's Ghost Recon: Jungle Storm	PlayStation 2	March 17, 2004	Ubisoft Paris	
CSI: Dark Motives	Microsoft Windows	March 23, 2004	369 Interactive	
Far Cry	Microsoft Windows	March 23, 2004	Crytek, Signature Devices	
Tom Clancy's Splinter Cell: Pandora Tomorrow	Microsoft Windows	March 23, 2004	Ubisoft Shanghai, Ubisoft Annecy	
Tom Clancy's Splinter Cell: Pandora Tomorrow	Xbox	March 23, 2004	Ubisoft Shanghai, Ubisoft Annecy	
Harvest Moon: A Wonderful Life	GameCube	March 25, 2004	Marvelous Interactive	
Tom Clancy's Ghost Recon 2	GameCube	March 2004	Ubisoft Shanghai	
Fatal Frame II: Crimson Butterfly	PlayStation 2	April 28, 2004	Tecmo	
Tom Clancy's Splinter Cell: Pandora Tomorrow	PlayStation 2	June 18, 2004	Ubisoft Shanghai, Ubisoft Annecy	
Champions of Norrath	PlayStation 2	June 25, 2004	Snowblind Studios	
Tom Clancy's Rainbow Six 3	GameCube	June 2004	Ubisoft Shanghai	
Tom Clancy's Splinter Cell: Pandora Tomorrow	GameCube	July 15, 2004	Ubisoft Shanghai, Ubisoft Annecy	
Tom Clancy's Rainbow Six 3: Black Arrow	Xbox	August 5, 2004	Ubisoft Montreal, Ubisoft Milan	
The Political Machine	Microsoft Windows	August 10, 2004	Stardock Entertainment	
Chessmaster 10th Edition	Microsoft Windows	August 16, 2004	Ubisoft Bucharest	
Advance Guardian Heroes	Game Boy Advance	September 14, 2004	Treasure	
Star Wars Trilogy: Apprentice of the Force	Game Boy Advance	September 21, 2004	Ubisoft Montreal	
Rocky Legends	PlayStation 2	September 28, 2004	Venom Games	
Rocky Legends	Xbox	September 28, 2004	Venom Games	
Sherlock Holmes: The Case of the Silver Earring	Microsoft Windows	September 28, 2004	Frogwares	
The Dukes of Hazzard: Return of the General Lee	PlayStation 2	September 28, 2004	Ratbag	
The Dukes of Hazzard: Return of the General Lee	Xbox	September 28, 2004	Ratbag	
Myst IV: Revelation	Mac OS	September 29, 2004	Ubisoft Montreal	
Myst IV: Revelation	Microsoft Windows	September 29, 2004	Ubisoft Montreal	
Ape Escape: Pumped & Primed	PlayStation 2	October 20, 2004	Japan Studio	
Pacific Fighters	Microsoft Windows	October 22, 2004	1C:Maddox Games	
Chessmaster 10th Edition	Xbox	October 27, 2004	Ubisoft Bucharest	
CSI: Miami	Microsoft Windows	November 16, 2004	369 Interactive	
Tom Clancy's Ghost Recon 2	Xbox	November 16, 2004	Red Storm Entertainment	
Asphalt: Urban GT	Nintendo DS	November 21, 2004	Gameloft Montreal	
Alexander	Microsoft Windows	November 23, 2004	GSC Game World	
Prince of Persia: Warrior Within	GameCube	November 30, 2004	Ubisoft Montreal	
Prince of Persia: Warrior Within	Microsoft Windows	November 30, 2004	Ubisoft Montreal	
Prince of Persia: Warrior Within	PlayStation 2	November 30, 2004	Ubisoft Montreal	
Prince of Persia: Warrior Within	Xbox	November 30, 2004	Ubisoft Montreal	
Biathlon 2005	Microsoft Windows	December 2, 2004	Geronimo Entertainment	
Sprung	Nintendo DS	December 8, 2004	Guillemot	
CSI: Crime Scene Investigation	Xbox	December 14, 2004	369 Interactive	
Tom Clancy's Ghost Recon 2	PlayStation 2	2004	Ubisoft Shanghai, Ubisoft Paris	
2005
Tork: Prehistoric Punk	Xbox	January 12, 2005	Tiwak	
Disney's Winnie the Pooh's Rumbly Tumbly Adventure	GameCube	February 8, 2005	Phoenix Studio	
Disney's Winnie the Pooh's Rumbly Tumbly Adventure	PlayStation 2	February 8, 2005	Phoenix Studio	
Heritage of Kings: The Settlers	Microsoft Windows	February 24, 2005	Blue Byte	
Brothers in Arms: Road to Hill 30	Xbox	March 1, 2005	Gearbox Software	
Playboy: The Mansion	Microsoft Windows	March 1, 2005	Cyberlore Studios	
Playboy: The Mansion	PlayStation 2	March 4, 2005	Cyberlore Studios	
Playboy: The Mansion	Xbox	March 4, 2005	Cyberlore Studios	
Brothers in Arms: Road to Hill 30	Microsoft Windows	March 15, 2005	Gearbox Software	
Brothers in Arms: Road to Hill 30	PlayStation 2	March 15, 2005	Gearbox Software	
Cold Fear	PlayStation 2	March 15, 2005	Darkworks	
Cold Fear	Xbox	March 15, 2005	Darkworks	
Champions: Return to Arms	PlayStation 2	March 17, 2005	Snowblind Studios	
Rayman: Hoodlum's Revenge	Game Boy Advance	March 17, 2005	Digital Eclipse	
Silent Hunter III	Microsoft Windows	March 17, 2005	Ubisoft Bucharest	
Rayman DS	Nintendo DS	March 24, 2005	DC Studios	
The Bard's Tale	Microsoft Windows	March 24, 2005	InXile Entertainment	
The Bard's Tale	PlayStation 2	March 24, 2005	InXile Entertainment	
The Bard's Tale	Xbox	March 24, 2005	InXile Entertainment	
Lumines: Puzzle Fusion	PlayStation Portable	March 25, 2005	Q Entertainment	
Cold Fear	Microsoft Windows	March 28, 2005	Darkworks	
Myst IV: Revelation	Xbox	March 28, 2005	Ubisoft Montreal	
Tom Clancy's Splinter Cell: Chaos Theory	GameCube	March 28, 2005	Ubisoft Montreal	
Tom Clancy's Splinter Cell: Chaos Theory	Microsoft Windows	March 28, 2005	Ubisoft Montreal, Ubisoft Annecy	
Tom Clancy's Splinter Cell: Chaos Theory	PlayStation 2	March 28, 2005	Ubisoft Montreal	
Tom Clancy's Splinter Cell: Chaos Theory	Xbox	March 28, 2005	Ubisoft Montreal, Ubisoft Annecy	
Star Wars: Episode III - Revenge of the Sith	Game Boy Advance	May 4, 2005	Ubisoft Montreal	
Star Wars: Episode III - Revenge of the Sith	Nintendo DS	May 4, 2005	Ubisoft Montreal	
Bomberman	Nintendo DS	June 21, 2005	Racjin	
Tom Clancy's Splinter Cell: Chaos Theory	Nintendo DS	June 28, 2005	Ubisoft Montreal	
Bomberman Hardball	PlayStation 2	July 1, 2005	Magical Company	
Tom Clancy's Ghost Recon 2: Summit Strike	Xbox	August 2, 2005	Red Storm Entertainment	
Darkwatch	PlayStation 2	August 16, 2005	High Moon Studios	
187: Ride or Die	PlayStation 2	August 25, 2005	Ubisoft Paris, NextGen Entertainment	
187: Ride or Die	Xbox	August 25, 2005	Ubisoft Paris, NextGen Entertainment	
Tom Clancy's Rainbow Six: Lockdown	PlayStation 2	September 6, 2005	Red Storm Entertainment	
Tom Clancy's Rainbow Six: Lockdown	Xbox	September 6, 2005	Ubisoft Montreal	
Myst V: End of Ages	Microsoft Windows	September 19, 2005	Cyan Worlds	
Marathon Manager	Microsoft Windows	September 22, 2005	Geronimo Entertainment	
Myst V: End of Ages	Mac OS	September 23, 2005	Beenox	
Far Cry Instincts	Xbox	September 27, 2005	Ubisoft Montreal	
Lunar: Dragon Song	Nintendo DS	September 27, 2005	Japan Art Media	
Tom Clancy's Rainbow Six: Lockdown	GameCube	September 27, 2005	Ubisoft Montreal	
Heroes of the Pacific	PlayStation 2	September 30, 2005	IR Gurus Interactive	
Brothers in Arms: Earned in Blood	Microsoft Windows	October 7, 2005	Gearbox Software	
Brothers in Arms: Earned in Blood	PlayStation 2	October 7, 2005	Gearbox Software	
Brothers in Arms: Earned in Blood	Xbox	October 7, 2005	Gearbox Software	
FLOW: Urban Dance Uprising	PlayStation 2	November 15, 2005	Artificial Mind & Movement	
America's Army: Rise of a Soldier	Xbox	November 17, 2005	Army Game Studio, Demiurge Studios	
America's Army: True Soldiers	Xbox 360	November 17, 2005	Red Storm Entertainment	
GripShift	PlayStation Portable	November 17, 2005	Sidhe Interactive	
King Kong: The Official Game of the Movie	GameCube	November 21, 2005	Ubisoft Montpellier	
King Kong: The Official Game of the Movie	Microsoft Windows	November 21, 2005	Ubisoft Bucharest	
King Kong: The Official Game of the Movie	Nintendo DS	November 21, 2005	Ubisoft Casablanca	
King Kong: The Official Game of the Movie	PlayStation 2	November 21, 2005	Ubisoft Montpellier	
King Kong: The Official Game of the Movie	Xbox	November 21, 2005	Ubisoft Montpellier	
King Kong: The Official Game of the Movie	Xbox 360	November 21, 2005	Ubisoft Montreal, Ubisoft Montpellier	
Kong: The 8th Wonder of the World	Game Boy Advance	November 21, 2005	Ubisoft Montreal	
Trollz: Hair Affair!	Game Boy Advance	November 2005	Powerhead Games	
Frantix	PlayStation Portable	December 1, 2005	Killer Game	
Prince of Persia: The Two Thrones	Microsoft Windows	December 1, 2005	Ubisoft Montreal, Ubisoft Casablanca	
Prince of Persia: The Two Thrones	PlayStation 2	December 2, 2005	Ubisoft Montreal, Ubisoft Casablanca	
Battles of Prince of Persia	Nintendo DS	December 6, 2005	Ubisoft Montreal	
Prince of Persia: Revelations	PlayStation Portable	December 6, 2005	Pipeworks Software	
Prince of Persia: The Two Thrones	GameCube	December 9, 2005	Ubisoft Montreal, Ubisoft Casablanca	
Prince of Persia: The Two Thrones	Xbox	December 9, 2005	Ubisoft Montreal, Ubisoft Casablanca	
King Kong: The Official Game of the Movie	PlayStation Portable	December 20, 2005	Phoenix Studio, Ubisoft Bucharest	
Biathlon 2006: Go for Gold	Microsoft Windows	December 2005	Geronimo Entertainment	
Biathlon 2006: Go for Gold	PlayStation 2	December 2005	Geronimo Entertainment	
2006
Pippa Funnell: The Stud Farm Inheritance	Microsoft Windows	January 27, 2006	Lexis Numérique	
Rugby Challenge 2006	PlayStation 2	February 3, 2006	Swordfish Studios	
Rugby Challenge 2006	Xbox	February 3, 2006	Swordfish Studios	
Drakengard 2	PlayStation 2	February 14, 2006	Cavia	
Exit	PlayStation Portable	February 14, 2006	Taito	
Tom Clancy's Rainbow Six: Lockdown	Microsoft Windows	February 15, 2006	Red Storm Entertainment	
Curling 2006	Microsoft Windows	February 2006	Geronimo Entertainment	
Tom Clancy's Ghost Recon Advanced Warfighter	PlayStation 2	March 9, 2006	Ubisoft Shanghai	
Tom Clancy's Ghost Recon Advanced Warfighter	Xbox	March 9, 2006	Ubisoft Shanghai	
Tom Clancy's Ghost Recon Advanced Warfighter	Xbox 360	March 9, 2006	Red Storm Entertainment, Ubisoft Barcelona, Ubisoft Paris, Ubisoft Tiwak	
CSI: 3 Dimensions of Murder	Microsoft Windows	March 14, 2006	Telltale Games	
Tom Clancy's Rainbow Six: Critical Hour	Xbox	March 14, 2006	Ubisoft Quebec	
Call of Cthulhu: Dark Corners of the Earth	Microsoft Windows	March 17, 2006	Headfirst Productions	
Blazing Angels: Squadrons of WWII	Xbox	March 23, 2006	Ubisoft Bucharest	
Blazing Angels: Squadrons of WWII	Xbox 360	March 23, 2006	Ubisoft Bucharest	
Monster 4x4: World Circuit	Xbox	March 23, 2006	Ubisoft Montreal	
Street Riders	PlayStation Portable	March 24, 2006	Virtuos	
Blazing Angels: Squadrons of WWII	Microsoft Windows	March 28, 2006	Ubisoft Bucharest	
Far Cry: Instincts - Evolution	Xbox	March 28, 2006	Ubisoft Montreal	
Far Cry: Instincts - Predator	Xbox 360	March 28, 2006	Ubisoft Montreal	
Pippa Funnell: Take the Reins	Microsoft Windows	March 31, 2006	Lexis Numérique	
Tom Clancy's Splinter Cell: Essentials	PlayStation Portable	March 31, 2006	Ubisoft Montreal	
Dogz	Game Boy Advance	April 20, 2006	MTO	
LostMagic	Nintendo DS	April 25, 2006	Taito	
Paradise	Microsoft Windows	April 27, 2006	White Birds Productions	
Tom Clancy's Ghost Recon Advanced Warfighter	Microsoft Windows	May 3, 2006	Grin	
Heroes of Might and Magic V	Microsoft Windows	May 23, 2006	Nival Interactive	
Call of Juarez	Xbox 360	June 5, 2006	Techland	
AND 1 Streetball	PlayStation 2	June 6, 2006	Black Ops Entertainment	
AND 1 Streetball	Xbox	June 6, 2006	Black Ops Entertainment	
Astonishia Story	PlayStation Portable	June 27, 2006	Sonnori	
Over G Fighters	Xbox 360	June 27, 2006	Taito, GuruGuru, Pegasus Japan	
Pirates of the Caribbean: The Legend of Jack Sparrow	Microsoft Windows	June 27, 2006	7 Studios	
Pirates of the Caribbean: The Legend of Jack Sparrow	PlayStation 2	June 27, 2006	7 Studios	
Devil May Cry 3: Dante's Awakening - Special Edition	Microsoft Windows	June 30, 2006	Capcom Production Studio 1	
Enchanted Arms	Xbox 360	August 29, 2006	FromSoftware	
Call of Juarez	Microsoft Windows	September 7, 2006	Techland	
Faces of War	Microsoft Windows	September 12, 2006	Best Way	
Open Season	GameCube	September 12, 2006	Ubisoft Montreal	
Open Season	Microsoft Windows	September 12, 2006	Ubisoft Montreal	
Open Season	PlayStation 2	September 12, 2006	Ubisoft Montreal	
Open Season	Xbox	September 12, 2006	Ubisoft Montreal	
Open Season	Xbox 360	September 12, 2006	Ubisoft Montreal	
Open Season	PlayStation Portable	September 19, 2006	Ubisoft Quebec	
Ducati World Championship	Microsoft Windows	September 14, 2006	Artematica	
Import Tuner Challenge	Xbox 360	September 26, 2006	Genki	
The Settlers II: 10th Anniversary	Microsoft Windows	October 6, 2006	Funactics	
Tom Clancy's Splinter Cell: Double Agent	Xbox 360	October 17, 2006	Ubisoft Shanghai, Ubisoft Annecy, Ubisoft Milan	
Dark Messiah of Might and Magic	Microsoft Windows	October 25, 2006	Arkane Studios, Floodgate Entertainment, Kuju Entertainment	
Tom Clancy's Splinter Cell: Double Agent	GameCube	October 26, 2006	Ubisoft Montreal	
Tom Clancy's Splinter Cell: Double Agent	PlayStation 2	October 26, 2006	Ubisoft Montreal, Ubisoft Annecy, Ubisoft Milan	
Tom Clancy's Splinter Cell: Double Agent	Xbox	October 26, 2006	Ubisoft Montreal, Ubisoft Annecy, Ubisoft Milan	
Pippa Funnell: Take the Reins	PlayStation 2	October 27, 2006	Phoenix Studio	
Mind Quiz	PlayStation Portable	October 31, 2006	Sega Toys	
Tom Clancy's Splinter Cell: Double Agent	Microsoft Windows	November 9, 2006	Ubisoft Shanghai, Ubisoft Annecy, Ubisoft Milan	
Asphalt: Urban GT 2	Nintendo DS	November 14, 2006	Virtuos	
GT Pro Series	Wii	November 19, 2006	MTO	
Monster 4x4: World Circuit	Wii	November 19, 2006	Ubisoft Montreal	
Rayman Raving Rabbids	Wii	November 19, 2006	Ubisoft Pictures	
Red Steel	Wii	November 19, 2006	Ubisoft Paris	
Tom Clancy's Rainbow Six Vegas	Xbox 360	November 21, 2006	Ubisoft Montreal	
Dogz	Nintendo DS	November 22, 2006	MTO	
Horsez	Nintendo DS	November 28, 2006	Lexis Numérique, Virtual Toys	
Open Season	Wii	November 28, 2006	Ubisoft Montreal	
Tom Clancy's Splinter Cell: Double Agent	Wii	November 28, 2006	Ubisoft Montreal	
Safari Photo Africa: Wild Earth	Microsoft Windows	November 2006	Super X Studios	
Brothers in Arms: D-Day	PlayStation Portable	December 5, 2006	Ubisoft Shanghai	
Rayman Raving Rabbids	Game Boy Advance	December 5, 2006	Visual Impact	
Star Wars: Lethal Alliance	PlayStation Portable	December 5, 2006	Ubisoft Montreal	
Rayman Raving Rabbids	Microsoft Windows	December 8, 2006	Ubisoft Sofia	
Rayman Raving Rabbids	PlayStation 2	December 8, 2006	Ubisoft Pictures	
Blazing Angels: Squadrons of WWII	PlayStation 3	December 12, 2006	Ubisoft Bucharest	
Far Cry Vengeance	Wii	December 12, 2006	Ubisoft Montreal	
Tom Clancy's Rainbow Six Vegas	Microsoft Windows	December 12, 2006	Ubisoft Montreal	
Catz	Microsoft Windows	2006	ImaginEngine	
Dogz	Microsoft Windows	2006	ImaginEngine	
Pippa Funnell: The Golden Stirrup Challenge	Microsoft Windows	2006	Lexis Numérique	
Scrabble 2007 Edition	Nintendo DS	2006	Wizarbox	
Scrabble 2007 Edition	Microsoft Windows	2006	Wizarbox	
2007
Rocky Balboa	PlayStation Portable	January 26, 2007	Digital Fiction, Ubisoft Montreal	
Resident Evil 4	Microsoft Windows	February 23, 2007	Capcom Production Studio 4	
Rayman Raving Rabbids	Nintendo DS	March 6, 2007	Ubisoft Casablanca	
Tom Clancy's Ghost Recon Advanced Warfighter 2	Xbox 360	March 6, 2007	Ubisoft Paris, Red Storm Entertainment	
TMNT	Wii	March 13, 2007	Ubisoft Montreal	
Teenage Mutant Ninja Turtles	Xbox 360	March 14, 2007	Digital Eclipse	
Blazing Angels: Squadrons of WWII	Wii	March 20, 2007	Ubisoft Bucharest	
TMNT	Game Boy Advance	March 20, 2007	Ubisoft Montreal	
TMNT	GameCube	March 20, 2007	Ubisoft Montreal	
TMNT	Microsoft Windows	March 20, 2007	Ubisoft Montreal	
TMNT	PlayStation 2	March 20, 2007	Ubisoft Montreal	
TMNT	Xbox 360	March 20, 2007	Ubisoft Montreal	
Go! Sudoku	PlayStation Portable	March 21, 2007	Sumo Digital	
Silent Hunter 4: Wolves of the Pacific	Microsoft Windows	March 22, 2007	Ubisoft Bucharest	
Tom Clancy's Splinter Cell: Double Agent	PlayStation 3	March 30, 2007	Ubisoft Shanghai, Ubisoft Annecy, Ubisoft Milan	
Mind Quiz: Your Brain Coach	Microsoft Windows	March 2007	Oak Systems Leisure Software	
Beyond Divinity	Microsoft Windows	April 2, 2007	Larian Studios	
Enchanted Arms	PlayStation 3	April 3, 2007	FromSoftware	
Prince of Persia: Rival Swords	Wii	April 3, 2007	Ubisoft Montreal	
Prince of Persia: The Two Thrones	PlayStation Portable	April 6, 2007	Pipeworks Software	
Rayman Raving Rabbids	Xbox 360	April 6, 2007	Ubisoft Shanghai	
The Elder Scrolls IV: Oblivion	PlayStation 3	April 26, 2007	4J Studios	
Driver 76	PlayStation Portable	May 8, 2007	Sumo Digital, Ubisoft Reflections	
Platinum Sudoku	Nintendo DS	May 11, 2007	Gameloft Bucharest	
WarTech: Senko no Ronde	Xbox 360	May 22, 2007	G.rev	
Surf's Up	Game Boy Advance	May 29, 2007	Ubisoft Quebec	
Surf's Up	GameCube	May 29, 2007	Ubisoft Montreal	
Surf's Up	Microsoft Windows	May 29, 2007	Ubisoft Montreal	
Surf's Up	PlayStation 2	May 29, 2007	Ubisoft Montreal	
Surf's Up	PlayStation 3	May 29, 2007	Ubisoft Montreal	
Surf's Up	Wii	May 29, 2007	Ubisoft Montreal	
Surf's Up	Xbox 360	May 29, 2007	Ubisoft Montreal	
Prince of Persia Classic	Xbox 360	June 13, 2007	Gameloft Montreal	
Brothers in Arms DS	Nintendo DS	June 19, 2007	Gameloft Bucharest	
Tom Clancy's Rainbow Six Vegas	PlayStation 3	June 27, 2007	Ubisoft Shanghai	
Driver: Parallel Lines	Microsoft Windows	June 28, 2007	Reflections Interactive	
Driver: Parallel Lines	Wii	June 28, 2007	Reflections Interactive	
Tom Clancy's Rainbow Six Vegas	PlayStation Portable	June 28, 2007	Ubisoft Quebec	
The Settlers	Nintendo DS	July 12, 2007	Blue Byte	
Tom Clancy's Ghost Recon Advanced Warfighter 2	Microsoft Windows	July 12, 2007	Grin	
Top Trumps Adventures!	Wii	July 12, 2007	Slam Productions, SoGoPlay	
Tom Clancy's Ghost Recon Advanced Warfighter 2	PlayStation 3	August 21, 2007	Ubisoft Paris, Red Storm Entertainment	
Cosmic Family	Wii	August 31, 2007	Ubisoft Barcelona	
Jam Sessions	Nintendo DS	September 11, 2007	Plato	
Blazing Angels 2: Secret Missions of WWII	Microsoft Windows	September 18, 2007	Ubisoft Bucharest	
Blazing Angels 2: Secret Missions of WWII	Xbox 360	September 18, 2007	Ubisoft Bucharest	
CSI: 3 Dimensions of Murder	PlayStation 2	September 25, 2007	Ubisoft Sofia	
CSI: Hard Evidence	Microsoft Windows	September 25, 2007	Telltale Games	
CSI: Hard Evidence	Xbox 360	September 25, 2007	Telltale Games	
Brain Spa	Microsoft Windows	September 2007	Legacy Interactive	
The Settlers: Rise of an Empire	Microsoft Windows	October 4, 2007	Blue Byte, 4HEAD Studios, Rocket Science Games, Zampano Studios	
Real Football 2008 3D	Nintendo DS	October 12, 2007	Gameloft Beijing	
Top Trumps: Dogs & Dinosaurs	Nintendo DS	October 12, 2007	Slam Productions, SoGoPlay	
Top Trumps: Dogs & Dinosaurs	PlayStation 2	October 12, 2007	Slam Productions, SoGoPlay	
Top Trumps: Horror & Predators	Nintendo DS	October 12, 2007	Slam Productions, SoGoPlay	
Top Trumps: Horror & Predators	PlayStation 2	October 12, 2007	Slam Productions, SoGoPlay	
Heroes of Might and Magic V: Tribes of the East	Microsoft Windows	October 17, 2007	Nival	
Totally Spies! 3: Secret Agents	Nintendo DS	October 18, 2007	Magic Pockets	
Chessmaster: Grandmaster Edition	Nintendo DS	October 23, 2007	Ubisoft Sofia	
Imagine: Animal Doctor	Nintendo DS	October 23, 2007	Lexis Numérique, Virtual Toys	
Imagine: Babyz	Nintendo DS	October 23, 2007	Visual Impact	
Imagine: Fashion Designer	Nintendo DS	October 23, 2007	Virtual Toys	
Imagine: Master Chef	Nintendo DS	October 23, 2007	MTO	
Naruto: Rise of a Ninja	Xbox 360	October 30, 2007	Ubisoft Montreal	
Petz Wild Animals: Dolphinz	Nintendo DS	October 2007	Magic Pockets	
Chessmaster: Grandmaster Edition	Microsoft Windows	November 1, 2007	Ubisoft Bucharest	
CSI: Dark Motives	Nintendo DS	November 2, 2007	Powerhead Games	
Telly Addicts	Nintendo DS	November 2, 2007	Route 1 Games	
Telly Addicts	PlayStation 2	November 2, 2007	Route 1 Games	
Telly Addicts	PlayStation Portable	November 2, 2007	Route 1 Games	
Who Wants to Be a Millionaire: 1st Edition	Nintendo DS	November 2, 2007	Route 1 Games, Slam Productions	
Imagine: Interior Designer	Nintendo DS	November 4, 2007	Little Worlds Studio	
Imagine: Wedding Designer	Nintendo DS	November 4, 2007	Southlogic Studios	
Blazing Angels 2: Secret Missions of WWII	PlayStation 3	November 6, 2007	Ubisoft Bucharest	
My French Coach	Nintendo DS	November 6, 2007	Sensory Sweep Studios	
My Spanish Coach	Nintendo DS	November 6, 2007	Sensory Sweep Studios	
My Spanish Coach	PlayStation Portable	November 6, 2007	Sensory Sweep Studios	
My Word Coach	Nintendo DS	November 6, 2007	Ubisoft Montreal	
My Word Coach	Wii	November 6, 2007	Ubisoft Montreal	
Beowulf: The Game	Microsoft Windows	November 13, 2007	Ubisoft Tiwak, Ubisoft Paris, Ubisoft Shanghai	
Beowulf: The Game	PlayStation 3	November 13, 2007	Ubisoft Tiwak, Ubisoft Paris, Ubisoft Shanghai	
Beowulf: The Game	Xbox 360	November 13, 2007	Ubisoft Tiwak, Ubisoft Paris, Ubisoft Shanghai	
Petz: Catz 2	Microsoft Windows	November 13, 2007	ImaginEngine	
Petz: Catz 2	Nintendo DS	November 13, 2007	Powerhead Games	
Petz: Catz 2	PlayStation 2	November 13, 2007	Yuke's	
Petz: Catz 2	Wii	November 13, 2007	Yuke's	
Petz: Dogz 2	Microsoft Windows	November 13, 2007	ImaginEngine	
Petz: Dogz 2	PlayStation 2	November 13, 2007	Yuke's	
Petz: Dogz 2	Wii	November 13, 2007	Yuke's	
Petz: Horsez 2	Nintendo DS	November 13, 2007	Lexis Numérique, Virtual Toys	
Rayman Raving Rabbids 2	Nintendo DS	November 13, 2007	Ubisoft Paris	
Assassin's Creed	PlayStation 3	November 14, 2007	Ubisoft Montreal	
Assassin's Creed	Xbox 360	November 14, 2007	Ubisoft Montreal	
Rayman Raving Rabbids 2	Wii	November 15, 2007	Ubisoft Paris	
Petz: Hamsterz 2	Nintendo DS	November 23, 2007	HI Corporation	
Cranium Kabookii	Wii	November 27, 2007	Ubisoft Quebec	
Horsez	Game Boy Advance	2007	Independent Arts Software	
Petz: Horsez 2	PlayStation 2	2007	Phoenix Interactive	
Petz: Horsez 2	Wii	2007	Phoenix Interactive	
2008
Miami Nights: Singles in the City	Nintendo DS	January 15, 2008	Gameloft Bucharest	
Nitrobike	Wii	January 15, 2008	Left Field Productions	
No More Heroes	Wii	January 22, 2008	Grasshopper Manufacture	
Chessmaster Live	Xbox 360	January 30, 2008	Ubisoft Sofia	
Assassin's Creed: Altaïr's Chronicles	Nintendo DS	February 5, 2008	Gameloft Bucharest	
Puppy Palace	Nintendo DS	February 5, 2008	Digital Kids	
Dark Messiah: Might and Magic - Elements	Xbox 360	February 12, 2008	Ubisoft Annecy	
Chessmaster: The Art of Learning	PlayStation Portable	February 13, 2008	Ubisoft Sofia	
Top Trumps: Dogs & Dinosaurs	Microsoft Windows	February 15, 2008	Slam Productions, SoGoPlay	
Lost: Via Domus	Microsoft Windows	February 26, 2008	Ubisoft Montreal	
Lost: Via Domus	PlayStation 3	February 26, 2008	Ubisoft Montreal	
Lost: Via Domus	Xbox 360	February 26, 2008	Ubisoft Montreal	
Petz: Wild Animals - Tigerz	Nintendo DS	February 26, 2008	Magic Pockets	
Anno 1701: Dawn of Discovery	Nintendo DS	March 4, 2008	Sunflowers Interactive	
Imagine: Figure Skater	Nintendo DS	March 4, 2008	Spike	
Petz: Bunnyz	Nintendo DS	March 4, 2008	Digital Kids	
Tom Clancy's Rainbow Six Vegas 2	PlayStation 3	March 18, 2008	Ubisoft Montreal	
Tom Clancy's Rainbow Six Vegas 2	Xbox 360	March 18, 2008	Ubisoft Montreal	
Nitrobike	PlayStation 2	March 2008	Left Field Productions	
Tom Clancy's Rainbow Six Vegas 2	Microsoft Windows	April 16, 2008	Ubisoft Montreal	
The Dog Island	Wii	May 6, 2008	Yuke's	
Haze	PlayStation 3	May 20, 2008	Free Radical Design	
Emergency Heroes	Wii	May 27, 2008	Ubisoft Barcelona, Ubisoft Reflections	
Protöthea	Wii	June 2, 2008	Digital Builders, Sabarasa	
Rayman Raving Rabbids 2	Microsoft Windows	June 5, 2008	Ubisoft Paris	
Petz: Horsez 2	Microsoft Windows	June 13, 2008	Lexis Numérique	
Stratego: Next Edition	Nintendo DS	June 13, 2008	Triangle Studios	
Imagine: Rock Star	Nintendo DS	June 17, 2008	Gevo Entertainment	
My Weight Loss Coach	Nintendo DS	June 24, 2008	Ubisoft Montreal	
Gourmet Chef	Nintendo DS	June 29, 2008	Creative Patterns	
Animal Genius	Nintendo DS	July 18, 2008	Big Blue Bubble	
Quick Yoga Training	Nintendo DS	August 5, 2008	MOSS	
Imagine: Teacher	Nintendo DS	August 12, 2008	Magic Pockets	
My Chinese Coach	Nintendo DS	August 26, 2008	Sensory Sweep Studios	
The Settlers: Rise of Cultures	Microsoft Windows	August 28, 2008	Funatics, Blue Byte	
Hell's Kitchen: The Game	Nintendo DS	September 9, 2008	Mistic Soft	
Hell's Kitchen: The Game	Wii	September 9, 2008	Ludia	
The Price Is Right	Nintendo DS	September 9, 2008	Ludia	
The Price Is Right	Wii	September 9, 2008	Ludia	
Armored Core: For Answer	PlayStation 3	September 18, 2008	FromSoftware	
Armored Core: For Answer	Xbox 360	September 18, 2008	FromSoftware	
Hell's Kitchen: The Game	Microsoft Windows	September 22, 2008	Ludia	
Brothers in Arms: Hell's Highway	PlayStation 3	September 23, 2008	Gearbox Software, Mad Doc Software	
Brothers in Arms: Hell's Highway	Xbox 360	September 23, 2008	Gearbox Software, Mad Doc Software	
My SAT Coach	Nintendo DS	September 23, 2008	Ubisoft Montreal	
Brothers in Arms: Double Time	Wii	September 26, 2008	Demiurge Studios	
My Secret World by Imagine	Nintendo DS	October 1, 2008	Ubisoft Milan	
Brothers in Arms: Hell's Highway	Microsoft Windows	October 7, 2008	Gearbox Software, Mad Doc Software	
Imagine: Babysitters	Nintendo DS	October 7, 2008	Visual Impact	
Imagine: Fashion Designer - New York	Nintendo DS	October 7, 2008	Lexis Numérique, Virtual Toys	
Imagine: Champion Rider	Nintendo DS	October 9, 2008	Lexis Numérique, Virtual Toys	
Battle of Giants: Dinosaurs	Nintendo DS	October 14, 2008	Ubisoft Quebec	
Cesar Millan's Dog Whisperer	Microsoft Windows	October 14, 2008	ImaginEngine	
Cesar Millan's Dog Whisperer	Nintendo DS	October 14, 2008	ImaginEngine	
My Japanese Coach	Nintendo DS	October 14, 2008	Sensory Sweep Studios	
The Dog Island	PlayStation 2	October 14, 2008	Yuke's	
CSI: NY - The Game	Microsoft Windows	October 19, 2008	Legacy Interactive, Mystery Studio	
Circus Games	Wii	October 21, 2008	Kuju America, Kuju Manila	
Ener-G: Dance Squad	Nintendo DS	October 21, 2008	Lexis Numérique	
Far Cry 2	Microsoft Windows	October 21, 2008	Ubisoft Montreal	
Far Cry 2	PlayStation 3	October 21, 2008	Ubisoft Montreal	
Far Cry 2	Xbox 360	October 21, 2008	Ubisoft Montreal	
Prince of Persia Classic	PlayStation 3	October 23, 2008	Gameloft Montreal	
Guitar Rock Tour	Nintendo DS	October 24, 2008	Gameloft Montreal	
Petz: Horse Club	Microsoft Windows	October 28, 2008	Phoenix Interactive	
Petz: Horse Club	Wii	October 28, 2008	Phoenix Interactive	
Petz Rescue: Ocean Patrol	Nintendo DS	October 28, 2008	Magic Pockets	
Petz Rescue: Wildlife Vet	Nintendo DS	October 28, 2008	Lexis Numérique, Virtual Toys	
Rayman Raving Rabbids: TV Party	Nintendo DS	November 3, 2008	Ubisoft Paris	
Family Fest Presents Movie Games	Wii	November 4, 2008	Phoenix Studio	
Tom Clancy's EndWar	PlayStation 3	November 4, 2008	Ubisoft Shanghai	
Tom Clancy's EndWar	Xbox 360	November 4, 2008	Ubisoft Shanghai	
Tom Clancy's EndWar	Nintendo DS	November 7, 2008	Funatics Software, Aruba Studios	
Tom Clancy's EndWar	PlayStation Portable	November 7, 2008	Funatics Software, Aruba Studios	
Imagine: Party Babyz	Wii	November 11, 2008	Visual Impact	
Shaun White Snowboarding	PlayStation 3	November 13, 2008	Ubisoft Montreal	
Shaun White Snowboarding	Xbox 360	November 13, 2008	Ubisoft Montreal	
Shaun White Snowboarding: Road Trip	PlayStation 2	November 16, 2008	Ubisoft Montreal	
Shaun White Snowboarding: Road Trip	Wii	November 16, 2008	Ubisoft Montreal	
Imagine: Ballet Star	Nintendo DS	November 18, 2008	Spike	
Imagine: Movie Star	Nintendo DS	November 18, 2008	Powerhead Games	
Naruto: The Broken Bond	Xbox 360	November 18, 2008	Ubisoft Montreal	
Petz: Crazy Monkeyz	Wii	November 18, 2008	Y'sK	
Petz: Monkeyz House	Nintendo DS	November 18, 2008	Digital Kids	
Rayman Raving Rabbids: TV Party	Wii	November 18, 2008	Ubisoft Paris	
Petz: Catz Clan	Nintendo DS	November 18, 2008	Digital Kids	
Petz Rescue: Endangered Paradise	Nintendo DS	November 18, 2008	Phoenix Interactive	
Who Wants to Be a Millionaire: 2nd Edition	Nintendo DS	November 28, 2008	Route 1 Games, Slam Productions	
My Stop Smoking Coach: Allen Carr's EasyWay	Nintendo DS	November 2008	Ubisoft Quebec	
Petz Sports	Wii	November 2008	Ubisoft Montreal	
Happy Cooking	Nintendo DS	December 2, 2008	MTO	
My Fun Facts Coach	Nintendo DS	December 2, 2008	Powerhead Games	
Prince of Persia	PlayStation 3	December 2, 2008	Ubisoft Montreal	
Prince of Persia	Xbox 360	December 2, 2008	Ubisoft Montreal	
Prince of Persia: The Fallen King	Nintendo DS	December 2, 2008	Ubisoft Casablanca	
Shaun White Snowboarding	Microsoft Windows	December 3, 2008	Ubisoft Montreal	
Prince of Persia	Microsoft Windows	December 9, 2008	Ubisoft Montreal	
Baby Life	Nintendo DS	2008	Gamelife, Neko Entertainment, Pastagames	
Telly Addicts	Wii	2008	Route 1 Games	
My Fitness Coach	Wii	2008	Respondesign	
2009
Imagine: Fashion Party	Wii	January 20, 2009	Lexis Numérique, Virtual Toys	
Imagine: Party Planner	Nintendo DS	January 26, 2009	Ubisoft São Paulo	
Imagine: Cheerleader	Nintendo DS	January 27, 2009	1st Playable Productions	
Jojo's Fashion Show: Design in a Dash!	Nintendo DS	January 27, 2009	GameBrains	
Imagine: Journalist	Nintendo DS	February 2, 2009	Magic Pockets	
Petz: Horseshoe Ranch	Nintendo DS	February 3, 2009	Digital Kids	
Tenchu: Shadow Assassins	Wii	February 5, 2009	Acquire	
Hell's Kitchen: The Game	Mac OS	February 17, 2009	Ludia	
Jake Power: Fireman	Nintendo DS	February 17, 2009	Magic Pockets	
Jake Power: Policeman	Nintendo DS	February 17, 2009	Magic Pockets	
Imagine: Ice Champions	Nintendo DS	February 24, 2009	Spike	
Tom Clancy's EndWar	Microsoft Windows	February 26, 2009	Ubisoft Shanghai	
Six Flags Fun Park	Wii	March 3, 2009	7 Studios	
Tom Clancy's H.A.W.X	PlayStation 3	March 5, 2009	Ubisoft Bucharest	
Tom Clancy's H.A.W.X	Xbox 360	March 5, 2009	Ubisoft Bucharest	
Grey's Anatomy: The Video Game	Microsoft Windows	March 11, 2009	Longtail Studios	
Grey's Anatomy: The Video Game	Nintendo DS	March 11, 2009	Longtail Studios	
Grey's Anatomy: The Video Game	Wii	March 11, 2009	Longtail Studios	
World in Conflict: Soviet Assault	Microsoft Windows	March 12, 2009	Massive Entertainment	
Vacation Sports	Wii	March 17, 2009	Mere Mortals	
Tom Clancy's H.A.W.X	Microsoft Windows	March 18, 2009	Ubisoft Bucharest	
Broken Sword: Shadow of the Templars - The Director's Cut	Nintendo DS	March 24, 2009	Revolution Software	
Broken Sword: Shadow of the Templars - The Director's Cut	Wii	March 24, 2009	Revolution Software	
Wheelman	Microsoft Windows	March 24, 2009	Midway Studios - Newcastle, Tigon Studios	
Wheelman	PlayStation 3	March 24, 2009	Midway Studios - Newcastle, Tigon Studios	
Wheelman	Xbox 360	March 24, 2009	Midway Studios - Newcastle, Tigon Studios	
Imagine: My Restaurant	Nintendo DS	March 27, 2009	Wizarbox	
Fashion Studio Paris Collection	Nintendo DS	March 31, 2009	Black Sheep Studio, Carré Multimédia	
Imagine: Family Doctor	Nintendo DS	March 31, 2009	Wizarbox	
My Fitness Coach	Wii	March 31, 2009	Rocket	
Tenchu: Shadow Assassins	PlayStation Portable	April 3, 2009	Acquire	
Imagine: Music Fest	Nintendo DS	May 5, 2009	Handheld Games	
Imagine: Makeup Artist	Nintendo DS	May 12, 2009	Global A Entertainment	
Imagine: Boutique Owner	Nintendo DS	June 2, 2009	Creative Patterns	
CellFactor: Psychokinetic Wars	PlayStation 3	June 3, 2009	Immersion Software	
CellFactor: Psychokinetic Wars	Xbox 360	June 3, 2009	Immersion Software	
My Spanish Coach	iOS	June 6, 2009	Sensory Sweep Studios	
Petz Fashion: Dogz and Catz	Nintendo DS	June 9, 2009	Powerhead Games	
Anno 1404	Microsoft Windows	June 25, 2009	Related Designs, Blue Byte	
Call of Juarez: Bound in Blood	Microsoft Windows	June 30, 2009	Techland	
Call of Juarez: Bound in Blood	PlayStation 3	June 30, 2009	Techland	
Call of Juarez: Bound in Blood	Xbox 360	June 30, 2009	Techland	
Teenage Mutant Ninja Turtles: Turtles in Time Re-Shelled	Xbox 360	August 5, 2009	Ubisoft Singapore	
Imagine: Soccer Captain	Nintendo DS	August 11, 2009	Powerhead Games	
Imagine: Teacher - Class Trip	Nintendo DS	August 25, 2009	Magic Pockets	
Imagine: Detective	Nintendo DS	September 1, 2009	Ubisoft São Paulo	
Academy of Champions: Soccer	Wii	September 8, 2009	Ubisoft Vancouver	
Cloudy with a Chance of Meatballs	Microsoft Windows	September 15, 2009	Ubisoft Shanghai	
Heroes Over Europe	Microsoft Windows	September 17, 2009	Transmission Games	
Heroes Over Europe	PlayStation 3	September 17, 2009	Transmission Games	
Heroes Over Europe	Xbox 360	September 17, 2009	Transmission Games	
Cloudy with a Chance of Meatballs	PlayStation 3	September 18, 2009	Ubisoft Shanghai	
Cloudy with a Chance of Meatballs	PlayStation Portable	September 18, 2009	Ubisoft Shanghai	
Cloudy with a Chance of Meatballs	Wii	September 18, 2009	Ubisoft Shanghai	
Cloudy with a Chance of Meatballs	Xbox 360	September 18, 2009	Ubisoft Shanghai	
NewU: Fitness First Personal Trainer	Wii	September 18, 2009	Lightning Fish Games	
Teenage Mutant Ninja Turtles: Smash-Up	PlayStation 2	September 22, 2009	Y's K, Game Art, Toylogic	
Teenage Mutant Ninja Turtles: Smash-Up	Wii	September 22, 2009	Y's K, Game Art, Toylogic	
The Price is Right: 2010 Edition	Microsoft Windows	September 22, 2009	Ludia	
The Price is Right: 2010 Edition	Nintendo DS	September 22, 2009	Ludia	
The Price is Right: 2010 Edition	Wii	September 22, 2009	Ludia	
Where's Waldo? The Fantastic Journey	Microsoft Windows	September 22, 2009	Ludia	
Where's Waldo? The Fantastic Journey	Nintendo DS	September 22, 2009	Ludia	
Where's Waldo? The Fantastic Journey	Wii	September 22, 2009	Ludia	
Battle of Giants: Dragons	Nintendo DS	September 29, 2009	Ubisoft Quebec	
Family Feud: 2010 Edition	Nintendo DS	September 29, 2009	Mistic Software, Ludia	
Imagine: Salon Stylist	Nintendo DS	September 29, 2009	Playbox	
Metropolis Crimes	Nintendo DS	October 1, 2009	Lexis Numérique	
Teenage Mutant Ninja Turtles: Turtles in Time Re-Shelled	PlayStation 3	October 1, 2009	Ubisoft Singapore	
Imagine: Zookeeper	Nintendo DS	October 6, 2009	Magic Pockets	
Imagine: Sweet 16	Nintendo DS	October 13, 2009	Longtail Studios	
Petz: Pony Beauty Pageant	Nintendo DS	October 13, 2009	HotGen Studios	
Cover Girl	PlayStation Portable	October 15, 2009	Neko Entertainment	
Imagine: Fashion Designer - World Tour	Nintendo DS	October 20, 2009	Lexis Numérique, Virtual Toys	
Petz Dolphinz Encounter	Nintendo DS	October 20, 2009	Magic Pockets	
Jam Sessions 2	Nintendo DS	October 20, 2009	Plato	
Panzer General: Allied Assault	Xbox 360	October 21, 2009	Petroglyph Games	
CSI: Deadly Intent	Microsoft Windows	October 27, 2009	Telltale Games	
CSI: Deadly Intent	Wii	October 27, 2009	Telltale Games	
CSI: Deadly Intent	Xbox 360	October 27, 2009	Telltale Games	
Imagine: Artist	Nintendo DS	October 27, 2009	Jet Black Games	
Monster 4x4 Stunt Racer	Wii	October 27, 2009	Ubisoft Reflections	
Petz: Dogz Family	PlayStation Portable	October 27, 2009	Ubisoft Nagoya	
Rabbids Go Home: A Comedy Adventure	Wii	November 1, 2009	Ubisoft Montpellier	
Battle of Giants: Dragons - Bronze Edition	Nintendo DSi	November 2, 2009	Ubisoft Quebec	
C.O.P.: The Recruit	Nintendo DS	November 3, 2009	VD-dev	
Imagine: Babyz Fashion	Nintendo DS	November 3, 2009	Visual Impact	
Rabbids Go Home	Nintendo DS	November 5, 2009	Ubisoft Casablanca	
Shaun White Snowboarding: World Stage	Wii	November 8, 2009	Ubisoft Montreal	
Knockout Party	Wii	November 9, 2009	Hydravision Entertainment	
Fairyland: Melody Magic	Nintendo DS	November 10, 2009	Ubisoft Shanghai	
Petz Nursery	Nintendo DS	November 10, 2009	Ubisoft Nagoya	
Style Lab: Jewelry Design	Nintendo DS	November 10, 2009	1st Playable Productions	
Style Lab: Makeover	Nintendo DS	November 10, 2009	Jet Black Games	
Assassin's Creed II	PlayStation 3	November 17, 2009	Ubisoft Montreal, Ubisoft Annecy, Ubisoft Singapore	
Assassin's Creed II	Xbox 360	November 17, 2009	Ubisoft Montreal, Ubisoft Annecy, Ubisoft Singapore	
Assassin's Creed II: Discovery	Nintendo DS	November 17, 2009	Griptonite	
Just Dance	Wii	November 17, 2009	Ubisoft Paris	
Petz: Dogz Talent Show	Nintendo DS	November 17, 2009	Ubisoft Nagoya	
Assassin's Creed: Bloodlines	PlayStation Portable	November 19, 2009	Griptonite	
Cook Wars	Wii	November 24, 2009	Virtual Toys	
Petz: Hamsterz Superstarz	Nintendo DS	November 24, 2009	Ubisoft Nagoya	
Your Shape	Wii	November 24, 2009	Ubisoft Barcelona	
Teenage Mutant Ninja Turtles: Arcade Attack	Nintendo DS	November 26, 2009	Ubisoft Nagoya, O-Two	
James Cameron's Avatar: The Game	Microsoft Windows	December 1, 2009	Ubisoft Montreal, Lightstorm Entertainment	
James Cameron's Avatar: The Game	PlayStation 3	December 1, 2009	Ubisoft Montreal, Lightstorm Entertainment	
James Cameron's Avatar: The Game	Xbox 360	December 1, 2009	Ubisoft Montreal, Lightstorm Entertainment	
James Cameron's Avatar: The Game	PlayStation Portable	December 1, 2009	Ubisoft Montreal	
James Cameron's Avatar: The Game	Wii	December 1, 2009	Ubisoft Montreal	
Might & Magic: Clash of Heroes	Nintendo DS	December 1, 2009	Capybara Games	
Rayman	Nintendo DSi	December 7, 2009	Junglevision Software	
Petz: Horsez 2	Wii	2009	Eko Software	
