= Dark Planet =

Dark Planet may refer to:

- Dark Planet (novel), a 2007 novel based on the television series Doctor Who
- Dark Planet (1997 film), an American science fiction film
- Dark Planet (2008 film), a 2008-2009 two-part Russian science fiction film
- Dark Planet (1983 video game), a 1983 video game
- Dark Planet: Battle for Natrolis, a 2002 video game

== See also ==
- Carbon planet, a theoretical type of planet that contains more carbon than oxygen
- X-ray dark planet
