= Shape Up (video game) =

2014 fitness game

- Developer: Ubisoft Montreal (Note: Additional work by Ubisoft Barcelona.)
- Publisher: Ubisoft
- Platform: Xbox One
- Release: NA: 11 November 2014; PAL: 13 November 2014; UK: 14 November 2014
- Genre: Fitness
- Modes: Single-player, multiplayer

Shape Up is a fitness game developed by Ubisoft Montreal and published by Ubisoft. It was released on Xbox One in November 2014 as a Kinect title. It was officially announced by Ubisoft at Electronic Entertainment Expo 2014.

== Gameplay ==
Shape Up combines exercise methods with novel workouts. For example, users may punch asteroids, squat to the moon or bench press an elephant. The game features arcade style visuals. A camera enables users to project their bodies onto the screen in order to keep track of workouts and calories burned. An online mode allows users to exercise with others. Users may choose from 90-second training sessions or long-term 4-week goal oriented sessions.

== Reception ==
Reception

Aggregate score
| Aggregator | Score |
|---|---|
| Metacritic | 58/100 |

Review scores
| Publication | Score |
|---|---|
| GamesTM | 5/10 |
| Hardcore Gamer | 2/5 |
| Jeuxvideo.com | 15/20 |
| Official Xbox Magazine (UK) | 7/10 |
| Common Sense Media | 3/5 |

Shape Up received "mixed" reviews according to the review aggregation website Metacritic. Robin Parker of GodisaGeek.com praised its vibrant art style, accurate performance of the Kinect sensor. He also praised the game for successfully making fitness entertaining, challenging and interesting. Marcus Estrada of Hardcore Gamer criticized the unforgiving difficulty of the game, lack of content and variety of quests, over-emphasis on speed instead of actual techniques and over-reliance on post-launch paid content. He also criticized the game for not reminding players' positioning problems or potential accidents. He described the game by saying that "Shape Up is a cool concept but a hollow experience which doesn't have nearly enough going for it to keep players hooked long term."
