= Teenage Mutant Ninja Turtles Legends =

2016 mobile game

- Developer: Ludia
- Publisher: Ludia
- Series: List of Teenage Mutant Ninja Turtles games
- Platforms: iPhone, iPad, Android, Kindle Fire
- Release: WW: May 26, 2016
- Genre: Role-playing

Teenage Mutant Ninja Turtles Legends is a role-playing video game based on the Teenage Mutant Ninja Turtles franchise, primarily on the 2012 series, developed and published by Ludia. It was released for iPhone, iPad, Android, and Kindle Fire in June 2016. It follows a free-to-play business model.

== Gameplay ==
In Legends, players take control of a group of mutants populated by characters from the Teenage Mutant Ninja Turtles franchise (primarily the characters from the 2012 series, but other iterations of certain characters also appear) to combat and defeat other similar groups encountered in the game. Rewards are given for every victory and are either selected at random based on the stage played or by a prize wheel that will spin until a tap from the player stops it. Certain rewards will allow players to summon and collect other characters (both heroes and villains) for use in battle.

=== Story Mode ===
The game's story mode features an original story set within the universe of the 2012 series, comprising seven chapters, each with its own set of stages and level of difficulty. The game's over-arcing plot involves Leonardo attempting to find and reunite with his brothers following an accidental separation. Along the way, Leo meets and teams up with a large number of characters from the franchise, including villains. Each stage rates the player upon completion (three stars, in this case ninja stars, are awarded if the player wins the stage with all party characters alive, while two are awarded if one character was killed and one star given in all other cases) and offers random items as a reward, usually items to level up characters, mutagen, warp passes and occasionally greenbacks.

=== Tournament Mode ===
Tournament Mode allows players to face other players' teams in battle (though not in real time; the opponent's characters are chosen at random and controlled by the computer). Each Tournament lasts for a week and is given a theme based around a specific character (e.g. "Mutagen Man Tournament" or "Dogpound Tournament"). A victory results in the player gaining anywhere from 25 to 35 points, while a loss means the player forfeits 7 to 10 points. There are several tiers with 100 spots each. The more matches that are won in the tournament, the higher the player's score and thus the higher the player ranks. Doing better than the score at first place on one tier bumps the player up to the next tier, though over time the points accumulated by other players could send a player back down to the previous tier. At the end of every tournament, the player will receive random rewards (though pizza points, greenbacks and DNA cards are usually included) based on their final rank and number of points. Prizes after each individual victory are determined by spinning a prize wheel.

== Reception ==
Reception

Review score
Publication	Score
Gamezebo	70/100
