= Cosmic Family =

2007 adventure video game

- Cover art for the Wii version of the game.
- Developer: Ubisoft Barcelona
- Publisher: Ubisoft
- Platforms: Wii, iOS
- Release: EU: August 31, 2007; NA: September 18, 2007
- Genre: Edutainment
- Mode: Single-player

Cosmic Family is an adventure video game developed by Ubisoft Barcelona and published by Ubisoft for the Wii. This game is geared towards younger children, and acts as an interactive tour of the Cosmic family's ship where the players have a chance to interact with the family itself through 15 mini-games. An Xbox 360 version was planned but cancelled.

== Gameplay ==
In the game, there are overall five floors of the spaceship. Characters are voiced by actors and are guiding players along, with most of the challenges being designed for children. People and items are both interactive, and by clicking on them mini cutscenes and clips will be triggered. The controls are based on point-and-click adventure games, with the Wii pointer being used to move around and select different sections of the ship. There are also various types of puzzles, like putting all the pieces of a broken vase back into the right place, or coloring the pictures. As a result of beating mini-games, the player gains flower petals. Successfully clicking on the right objects will unlock new levels of the family rocket.

== Development ==
Ubisoft originally released Cosmic Family for Microsoft Windows in 1997, before porting it to the Wii in 2007.

== Reception ==
Cosmic Family received mixed reviews from critics upon release. On Metacritic, the Wii version of the game holds a score of 54/100 based on 6 reviews.
