= Evil Twin: Cyprien's Chronicles =

2001 video game

- Developer: In Utero
- Publishers: Ubi Soft (PS2, Windows); BigBen Interactive (DC)
- Director: Yann Orhan
- Producer: Yves Guillemot
- Artist: Stéphane Bachelet
- Writers: Yann Orhan; Stéphane Bachelet; Guillaune Eluerd
- Composer: Bertrand Eluerd
- Platforms: Dreamcast, PlayStation 2, Windows
- Release: EU: Oct 4, 2001 (PC); EU: December 7, 2001 (PS2); EU: April 26, 2002 (DC)
- Genre: Platformer
- Mode: Single-player

Evil Twin: Cyprien's Chronicles is a platform game developed by Ubi Soft and In Utero for the Dreamcast, PlayStation 2, and Windows.

== Gameplay ==
The player takes control of a young orphan named Cyprien, who ventures through a nightmarish world and can transform into a superhero version of himself named Supercyp during his journey to Loren Darith to free his teddy bear, Lenny.

== Story ==
The story begins with Cyprien standing by a running sink in the restroom of his orphanage home and staring into the restroom mirror when his buddy Dave enters, asks him if he's okay, and invites him to come out into the main room so that the two of them could join in celebrating Cyprien's birthday. When they arrive, Cyprien's other friends, Vince, Joey, and Steve are waiting for him. He enters the room, completely apathetic and depressed. Steve explains that Cyprien's parents had died on his birthday and Cyprien leaves the room.

He is greeted by Lenny, his teddy bear and imaginary friend. Cyprien, already irritated with the flood of questions from his friends, becomes hysterical and tells Lenny that he is only a toy, and condemns Lenny's world (Undabed) to oblivion.

Cyprien begins to laugh and the room darkens, Lenny disappears and Cyprien's friends are being grabbed by dark shadowy tentacles. After the havok subsides, Cyprien awakens from his unconscious state and cannot find Lenny. He is then teleported to Undabed, and is greeted by Wilbur, a friend of Lenny's.

Wilbur then explains that a great wave swept everything away and a massive tower (Loren Darith) appeared, and in that tower lived a hideous creature named the "Master". The Master manipulated the people of Undabed by erasing all traces of the past and entrusted a key to the people of Demi Island, called "The Great Zippete".

Lenny went to Demi Island to obtain that very key, and was nearly able to get it. However, the Master's troops arrested Lenny before he could get his hands on it.

The Master took control of Demi Island by convincing the Demi people (whose bodies are split in two) that their bodies were once whole, and took away the Zippete and lied that it was vestige of when the Demi's where whole. The Master then divided the Zippete into four pieces, each scattered on 4 different worlds. It is then up to Cyprien to acquire the 4 parts of the Great Zippete, and free Lenny.

== Development ==
The game was originally intended to be released in late 1999 under the title of "Evil Twin" but was later delayed due to financial reasons. A gameplay video of the game was available on the Sega Dreamcast "Dreamon Collection 4" demo disc.

== Release ==
Evil Twin: Cyprien's Chronicles was released in Europe only and was one of the last PAL Dreamcast released games with a version distributed by BigBen Interactive. The game was exclusive to Game Stores Group and was also released for PlayStation 2 in December 2001.

== Soundtrack ==
The soundtrack didn't become available until 2010 when it was released under Bertrand Eluerd's Bandcamp account, compiled into three volumes. The first two volumes feature the in-game music with the third volume being a collection of leftovers, demos, and a couple of tracks from the aborted Evil Twin II project.

== Reception ==
Evil Twin: Cyprien's Chronicles received mixed reviews from various review sites. The game was praised for its level design, art direction and music by composer Bertrand Eluerd but also criticized for its poor controls and awkward camera. The Sega Dreamcast version of the game only saw a release in the PAL territory (Europe, Hong Kong, Australia and New Zealand).
