= Ludia =

Canadian video game developer

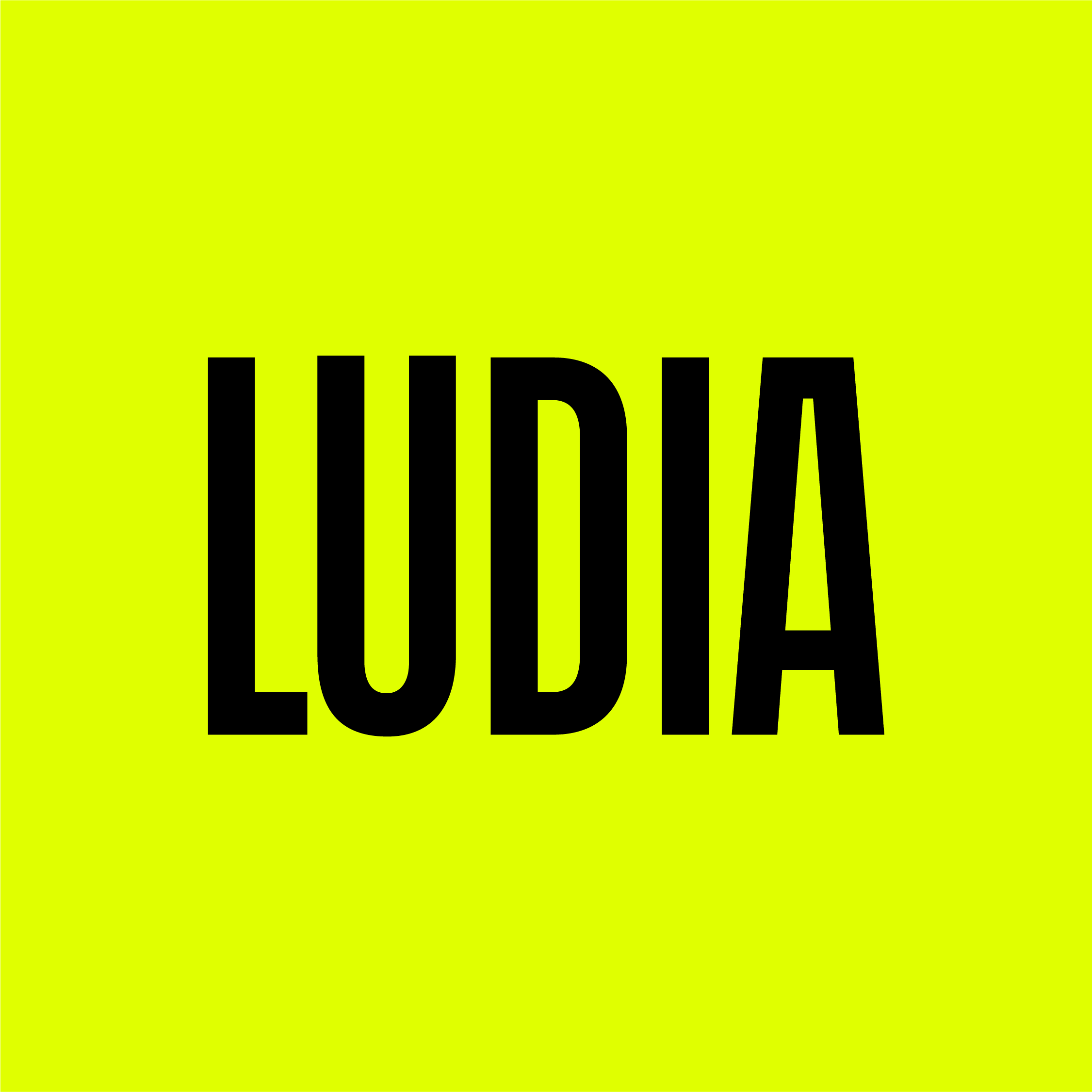
- Logo used since 2021

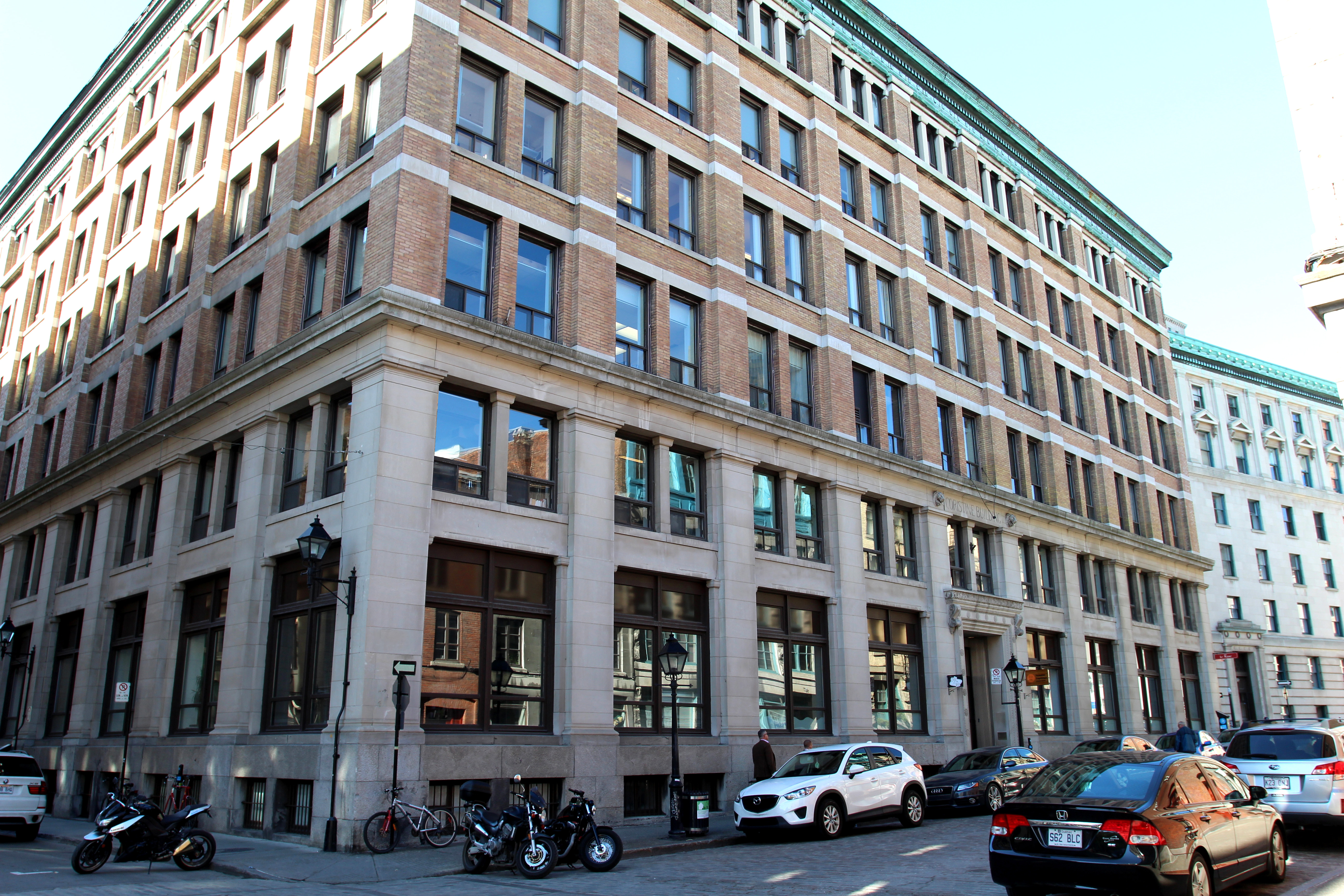
- Ludia's headquarters in Montreal's Old Port
- Type: Subsidiary
- Industry: Video games
- Founded: 2007; 19 years ago
- Headquarters: Montreal, Quebec, Canada
- Key people: Jimmy Gendron (CEO)
- Parent: Fremantle (2010–2021); Jam City (2021–2025)
- Website: www.ludia.com

Ludia is a Canadian video game developer based in Montreal, Quebec that creates and distributes cross-platform digital games with mass consumer appeal. Ludia produces original and branded properties based on game shows, television series, movies, books, and board games. In addition to developing games for Facebook, iOS, Android and Amazon, Ludia has created games for Nintendo DS, Microsoft Windows, Mac, PlayStation 3, Xbox 360, with Kinect, and Wii in the past.

The company works with the owners of original and branded properties such as Fremantle, DreamWorks Animation, Universal, Sony, CBS, BBC Worldwide, MGM Television, Disney, Nickelodeon and creates video games based on brands such as The Price Is Right, Family Feud/Family Fortunes, Press Your Luck, The 10,000 Dollar Pyramid, Hollywood Squares, Hole in the Wall, Are You Smarter than a 5th Grader?, The Weakest Link and Who Wants to Be a Millionaire.

In addition to game show properties, Ludia creates games based on brands such as Jurassic World, Jurassic Park, How to Train Your Dragon, The Flintstones, Where's Waldo, Popeye, Betty Boop, Hell's Kitchen, The Amazing Race, Teenage Mutant Ninja Turtles, and The Bachelor.

Fremantle acquired a majority stake in Ludia in October 2010. In September 2021, Ludia was acquired by Jam City for $165 million. In 2025, Jam City sold Ludia to a group of Canadian investors after they proposed an unexpected offer to purchase the company.

The founder of Ludia, Alexandre Thabet, is returning to the company as a shareholder and as chairman of the board.

== History ==
Ludia was founded on March 15, 2007, by industry veterans and headed by Alexandre Thabet, CEO. In that same year, Ludia signed its first licensing deals with Fremantle (The Price Is Right) and Fox (Hell's Kitchen).

In 2008, Ludia launched its first game based on The Price is Right on Wii, DS, PC, and iOS. In 2011, Ludia adopted the "Free to Play" or “Pay to Win” model. From 2009 to 2013, YouTube users played Ludia's video games, including Family Feud, The Price is Right and Press Your Luck. These videos continued the success for Ludia's video games. From 2008 to 2014, Ludia published video games based on popular game shows, and as of 2017, all of Ludia's video games based on game shows are now no longer available to play on the App Store, however you can still play Ludia's former titles on the game consoles of the company released them on. Ludia's last game based on a game show was the sequel to Family Feud & Friends, Family Feud & Friends 2 released on August 2, 2014. This game is still available to play, but has since been renamed Family Feud Live!, and re-released on the App Store on May 25, 2017, by new game developer Umi and Fremantle. Ludia is no longer part of development in this renamed game. Ludia had a large library of games that were popular in the underground, but unfortunately, these games have been discontinued.

== List of games ==
The following is a list of games developed by Ludia.

- All In & Friends (iOS devices only)
- Are You Smarter Than A 5th Grader? & Friends for iOS and Android
- Are You Smarter Than A 5th Grader? for iOS, Android, Facebook and Amazon Appstore
- Battlestar Galactica: Squadrons for iOS, Android, Facebook and Amazon Appstore
- Betty Boop Slots for iOS, Android and Facebook
- Bowling & Friends for iOS and Android
- Buzzr Casino for iOS and Android
- Dragons: Rise of Berk for iOS, Android, Facebook and Amazon Appstore
- DreamWorks Dragons: Titan Uprising (2019) for iOS and Android
- DC Heroes & Villains (2021) for iOS and Android
- Disney Wonderful Worlds (2021) for iOS and Android
- Family Feud: 2010 Edition (2009) for iOS and PS3
- Family Feud Decades (2010) for iOS, PS3, and Wii
- Family Feud: 2012 Edition (2011) for Wii & Xbox 360 systems only, Kinect optional
- Family Feud & Friends for iOS, Android, and Amazon Appstore
- Family Feud & Friends 2 for Android, iOS, Facebook and Amazon Appstore
- Family Fortunes (2010) for iOS devices only available in the U.K.
- Family Fortunes & Friends for iOS devices only available in the U.K.
- Fairy Tale Slots! for iOS and Facebook
- Flip Chip Poker
- Game Show Party (2010) "a bundle pack of The Price Is Right: 2010 Edition, Family Feud: 2010 Edition & Press Your Luck: 2010 Edition exclusively for the PS3 via PSN"
- Hell's Kitchen (2008) for PC, Mac, Wii, DS and iOS
- Hell's Kitchen VS. for iOS only
- Hole In The Wall (2011) for Xbox 360 only, Kinect required
- Hollywood Squares (2010) for iOS, PC, PS3 and Wii
- Jurassic Park Builder (2012) for iOS, Android, Facebook and Amazon Appstore
- Jurassic World: The Game (2015) for iOS, Android and Amazon Appstore
- Jurassic World Alive (2018) for iOS and Android
- Linkies Puzzle Rush for iOS only
- Lovelink (2020) For iOS and Android
- Mr. Peabody & Sherman for iOS and Android
- Planet Fish for Wiiware (2010) and iOS (2011)
- Popeye Slots for iOS and Android
- Press Your Luck for DS, iOS, Mac, PC, PS3, and Wii
- Press Your Luck Slots for iOS and Facebook
- Save Our Village for iOS only
- The Amazing Race (2010) for Wii and iOS
- Teenage Mutant Ninja Turtles Legends for iOS, Android and Amazon Appstore
- The Bachelor: The Videogame
- The Flintstones: Bring Back Bedrock for iOS, Android and Amazon Appstore
- The Price Is Right (2008)
- The Price Is Right: 2010 Edition (2009) for PS3 and Wii
- The Price Is Right Decades (2011) for iOS, Android, Amazon Appstore, PS3, Wii and Xbox 360, Kinect optional
- The Price Is Right Slots for iOS, Android, Facebook and Amazon Appstore
- The Price Is Right Bingo for iOS, Android, Facebook and Amazon Appstore
- The Weakest Link & Friends for iOS only
- The $1,000,000 Pyramid (2011) for Wii and iOS only
- Underworld for iOS, Android, Facebook and Amazon Appstore
- Warriors of Waterdeep (Dungeons and Dragons) (2019) for iOS and Android
- What’s Your Story for iOS and Android
- Where's Waldo & Friends for iOS, Android and Amazon Appstore
- Where's Waldo?: The Fantastic Journey (2009) for PC, Mac, Wii, DS, and iOS
- Where's Waldo?/Wally in Hollywood for iOS only
- Who Wants To Be A Millionaire (2010) for DS, PC, Wii, and PlayStation 3
- Who Wants To Be A Millionaire: 2012 Edition (2011) for Xbox 360 only, Kinect required
- Who Wants To Be A Millionaire & Friends for iOS, Android, Facebook and Amazon Appstore
