= Pro Rally 2001 =

2000 video game

- Developer: Ubi Soft Barcelona
- Publisher: Ubi Soft
- Platform: Windows
- Release: December 2000
- Genre: Racing
- Modes: Single-player, multiplayer

Pro Rally 2001 is a video game of the racing genre released in 2000 by Ubi Soft. A sequel, Pro Rally 2002, was released in 2002.

== Reception ==
Reception

Aggregate score
Aggregator	Score
GameRankings	63%

Review scores
Publication	Score
Eurogamer	5/10
PC Zone	60/100

Pro Rally 2001 was met with mixed reception, as GameRankings gave it a score of 63%. Eurogamer concluded that "The different Championship modes are all roughly the same, the teaching element is frustrating and badly planned, the handling and road-manners of the cars are dreadful, and there are plenty of others games available which do more of the same, only better.".
