= Pro Rally 2002 =

2002 video game

- PAL region cover art for PlayStation 2
- Developer: Ubi Soft Barcelona
- Publisher: Ubi Soft
- Platforms: PlayStation 2, GameCube
- Release: PlayStation 2: PAL: March 28, 2002; GameCube: PAL: October 4, 2002; NA: November 11, 2002
- Genre: Racing
- Modes: Single-player, multiplayer

Pro Rally 2002, or simply Pro Rally on the GameCube, is a video game of the racing genre released in 2002 by Ubi Soft. The game contains 20 licensed cars including Toyota Corolla WRC, Audi Quattro and 48 courses. The game is a sequel to the 2000 game Pro Rally 2001.

== Reception ==
Reception

Aggregate scores
Aggregator	Score
GameRankings	60%
Metacritic	64/100

Review scores
Publication	Score
GameSpy	3/5
GameZone	7.1/10
IGN	6.4/10
NGC Magazine	58%
Nintendo Power	3.3/5
Nintendo World Report	5.5/10
X-Play	2/5

The GameCube version was met with mixed reception, as GameRankings gave it a score of 60%, while Metacritic gave it 64 out of 100.
