= Disney's Dinosaur (video game) =

2000 video game

Dinosaur
- North American Game Boy Color cover art
- Developers: Ubi Soft Paris; Sandbox Studios (PlayStation); Digital Eclipse (Game Boy Color)
- Publisher: Ubi Soft (Note: Disney Interactive published the Microsoft Windows version)
- Platforms: Game Boy Color, PlayStation, Dreamcast, PlayStation 2, Windows
- Release: May 19, 2000: Game Boy Color; NA: May 19, 2000; EU: October 13, 2000 PlayStation; NA: August 16, 2000; EU: October 6, 2000 Dreamcast; EU: November 24, 2000; NA: November 28, 2000 PlayStation 2; EU: December 8, 2000 Windows; EU: December 15, 2000
- Genres: Action-adventure, platformer, puzzle
- Mode: Single-player

Dinosaur is a 2000 video game published by Ubi Soft. It is based on the 2000 animated film of the same name.

== Story ==
The game loosely follows the story of the film, starting with Aladar, Zini, Suri, and Plio on the Lemur Island. The island is destroyed in a meteor shower, forcing Aladar and his friends to flee to the mainland, where they encounter a herd of dinosaurs led by the ruthless Kron.

== Gameplay ==
All versions are played from a third-person top-down perspective. The game is mostly a platformer with puzzle elements. The goal on each level is to complete tasks, such as defeating all enemy dinosaurs in an area, or locating and leading lost dinosaurs back to a herd. Enemies include Velociraptor, Oviraptor, Albertosaurus, Dryptosaurus, Spinosaurus and Carnotaurus.

The PlayStation and Dreamcast versions both feature 12 levels. Most of the levels include checkpoints. The PC and console versions allow the player to separately or simultaneously control three characters: Aladar, Zini, and the Pteranodon that took Aladar's egg to the lemur island in the film, here dubbed Flia. The PC and console versions feature clips from the film, which play before and after each level.

The Game Boy Color version supports the use of the Game Boy Printer and features 27 levels, as well as six playable characters from the film: Aladar, Eema, Url, Zini, Plio and Suri.

== Reception ==
Reception

Aggregate scores
Aggregator	Score				
Aggregator	Dreamcast	GBC	PC	PS	PS2
GameRankings	49%	52%	N/A	52%	46%
Metacritic	53/100	N/A	N/A	44/100	N/A

Review scores
Publication	Score				
Publication	Dreamcast	GBC	PC	PS	PS2
AllGame	2/5	3.5/5	N/A	N/A	N/A
CNET Gamecenter	5/10	5/10	N/A	N/A	N/A
Consoles +	84%	N/A	N/A	N/A	84%
Electronic Gaming Monthly	5/10	N/A	N/A	N/A	N/A
EP Daily	N/A	N/A	N/A	3/10	N/A
Famitsu	N/A	N/A	N/A	N/A	24/40
Game Informer	N/A	3.75/10	N/A	2.25/10	N/A
GameFan	N/A	N/A	N/A	61% (Note: In GameFan's viewpoint of the PlayStation version, three critics gave it each a score of 59, 58, and 67.)	N/A
GameSpot	4.8/10	N/A	N/A	4.6/10	N/A
IGN	5.8/10	4/10	N/A	3/10	N/A
Jeuxvideo.com	N/A	10/20	9/20	11/20	N/A
Next Generation	2/5	N/A	N/A	N/A	N/A
Nintendo Power	N/A	5.8/10	N/A	N/A	N/A
Official U.S. PlayStation Magazine	N/A	N/A	N/A	1.5/5	N/A

The Dreamcast version received "mixed" reviews, while the PlayStation version received "unfavorable" reviews, according to the review aggregation website Metacritic. Blake Fischer of NextGen said the former console version was "Not as bad as most movie tie-ins, but still not a very compelling game." In Japan, where the PlayStation 2 version was ported for release on February 15, 2001, Famitsu gave it a score of all four sixes for a total of 24 out of 40. Extreme Ahab of GamePro said of the PlayStation version, "In the Darwinian video game market, this one's only hope for survival rests with younger gamers with enough patience for a truly basic title (think rental)." (Note: GamePro gave the PlayStation version two 2.5/5 scores for graphics and sound, 2/5 for control, and 3/5 for fun factor.)

Adam Cleveland of IGN reviewed the PlayStation version and said: "The game isn't exciting, the levels are drab, and the graphics are outdated. Dinosaur's objectives can be accomplished quickly, and the levels speed by. Before you know it, it's all over". Anthony Chau criticized the Dreamcast version for "horrible collision detection, tedious fighting sequences, and an overall gameplay experience that just isn't fun". Marc Nix criticized the Game Boy Color version for lack of good puzzles and gameplay as droned and boring. Nix also criticized the game for bad collision detection and controls, as well as three of its playable lemur characters: "You end up playing most of the game with a leaping monkey. That may be fun elsewhere, but I want to stomp, to swim, to fight. [...] If the game box says 'Dinosaur', I want Dinosaurs. [...] Even Aladar, the film's star, sees little screen time in this game". CNET Gamecenter's Colin Williamson considered it a "tired action/puzzler" game, although he praised the graphics.
