= Conflict Zone =

2001 video game

- Developer: MASA Group
- Publisher: Ubi Soft
- Platforms: Dreamcast, PlayStation 2, Windows
- Release: Windows: PAL: June 2001; NA: November 1, 2001; Dreamcast: NA: December 15, 2001; PAL: April 26, 2002; PlayStation 2: PAL: August 16, 2002; NA: October 19, 2002
- Genre: Real-time strategy
- Modes: Single-player, multiplayer

Conflict Zone is a war-themed real-time strategy game, developed by MASA Group and published by Ubi Soft for Dreamcast, PlayStation 2, and Microsoft Windows. It was the final third-party game released for the Dreamcast in the US (on December 15, 2001) and was amongst the final five games overall released for the Dreamcast in PAL regions (on April 26, 2002).

== Story ==
In 2010, the majority of the world's developed countries have formed a centralised organisation, known as the International Corps for Peace, dedicated to bringing about world peace through worldwide media, but not all developing countries are keen to be involved. Ghost, a secret organisation, seeks only the economic interests of its members without any attachment to morals thus does not hesitate to create crisis situations which the International Corps for Peace is forced to solve, through humiliation, and healthy propaganda.

== Gameplay ==
Conflict Zone feature two playable campaigns for each faction: the International Corps for Peace and Ghost as well as a Skirmish mode against the computer.

The Missions take place in various locations including a civil war in Ukraine and conflicts between Indonesia and Malaysia and a war between India, Pakistan, Nigeria and Niger.

Most missions usually require the player to build a base, train an army and then complete objectives in order to accomplish the mission.

Unlike most other traditional real-time strategy games, where a main resource pool is used to produce units and buildings, Conflict Zone uses a unique media coverage system where innocent civilians are the centerpiece and the factions offer different methods of approach.

Conflict Zone's main innovation was the use of propaganda, which was crucial in the game, coming in the form of Popularity Points to unlock units.

The International Corps for Peace employ highly trained units that can overwhelm their enemies directly but their actions are monitored by the news; Civilian welfare is a priority and neglecting them can drop their PP but sending and rescuing civilians via helicopter or bringing wounded soldiers will instead raise it.

Ghost, however, are lesser trained and thus weaker against the ICP's assault. However they can employ Cameramen units to film their havoc on their enemy's humanitarian efforts by destroying refugee helicopters and camps, intentionally put civilians in the crossfire and attack ICP forces, raising their standing with their member nations and their Popularity Points. Losing fights whilst in view with their Cameramen however drops their PP.

Conflict Zone also includes three AI Co-Commanders that the player can fund, interact and instruct which, in most cases, ease off some of the player's responsibilities. Each commander is tailored to a specific strategy: Attack, Defend, Commando and Specialist. By allocating resources, units and even bases to a co-commander, the player can have him/her perform various operations with whatever is at hand.

== Reception ==
Reception

Aggregate score
Aggregator	Score		
Aggregator	Dreamcast	PC	PS2
Metacritic	55/100	59/100	47/100

Review scores
Publication	Score		
Publication	Dreamcast	PC	PS2
Eurogamer	N/A	6/10	N/A
GameSpot	4.2/10	4.4/10	N/A
GameSpy	7.5/10	50%	N/A
IGN	5.6/10	6.7/10	4.1/10
Official U.S. PlayStation Magazine	N/A	N/A	2.5/5
PC Gamer (US)	N/A	60%	N/A
PC Zone	N/A	70%	N/A
PlayStation: The Official Magazine	N/A	N/A	5/10
X-Play	N/A	N/A	1/5

The Dreamcast and PC versions received "mixed" reviews, while the PlayStation 2 version received "generally unfavorable reviews", according to the review aggregation website Metacritic.
