= Crouching Tiger, Hidden Dragon (video game) =

2003 video game

- North American PS2 cover art
- Developers: Bergsala Lightweight; Genki
- Publishers: NA/EU: Ubi Soft; JP: Entertainment Software Publishing
- Platforms: PlayStation 2, Xbox, Game Boy Advance
- Release: Game Boy Advance: NA: October 9, 2003; EU: November 28, 2003; PlayStation 2: NA: October 9, 2003; EU: November 28, 2003; JP: January 22, 2004; Xbox: NA: December 9, 2003; EU: January 16, 2004
- Genre: Beat 'em up
- Mode: Single-player

Crouching Tiger, Hidden Dragon is a 2003 beat 'em up video game based on the 2000 film of the same name by Ang Lee. It was developed by Genki and Lightweight and published by Ubisoft for the PlayStation 2, Xbox, and Game Boy Advance. Players may play as Li Mu Bai, Yu Shu Lien, Jen, and Lo. The game uses the film score as its soundtrack which features music composed by Tan Dun with solos by cellist Yo-Yo Ma. A GameCube version of the game was planned, but cancelled for unknown reasons.

== Plot ==
The action is set in the Qing dynasty of 19th century China. Retiring swordsman Li decides to give his jade sword, 'The Green Destiny' to a nobleman. The sword is stolen soon after. Li goes forth to retrieve it, assisted by his friend Yu Shu Lien. The nobleman's daughter, Jen, keeps encountering both characters.

== Reception ==
Reception

Aggregate score
Aggregator	Score		
Aggregator	GBA	PS2	Xbox
Metacritic	60/100	48/100	52/100

Review scores
Publication	Score		
Publication	GBA	PS2	Xbox
Electronic Gaming Monthly	N/A	4/10	N/A
Eurogamer	N/A	2/10	N/A
Famitsu	N/A	26/40	N/A
Game Informer	7/10	6/10	N/A
GamePro	N/A	1.5/5	N/A
GameRevolution	N/A	D−	N/A
GameSpot	4.7/10	5.3/10	5.3/10
GameZone	6.5/10	5.5/10	6.5/10
IGN	6/10	4.8/10	4.8/10
Nintendo Power	3.5/5	N/A	N/A
Official U.S. PlayStation Magazine	N/A	2/5	N/A
Official Xbox Magazine (US)	N/A	N/A	5.8/10
Maxim	N/A	6/10	6/10
Playboy	N/A	50%	N/A

The Game Boy Advance and Xbox versions received "mixed" reviews, while the PlayStation 2 version received "unfavorable" reviews according to video game review aggregator Metacritic.
