= Speed Challenge: Jacques Villeneuve's Racing Vision =

2002 video game

- Developer: Ubi Soft
- Publisher: Ubi Soft
- Platforms: Windows, PlayStation 2, GameCube
- Release: Windows: PAL: October 3, 2002; GameCube: PAL: October 18, 2002; PlayStation 2: PAL: November 22, 2002
- Genre: Racing
- Modes: Single-player, multiplayer

Speed Challenge: Jacques Villeneuve's Racing Vision is a racing game published in 2002 by Ubi Soft in Europe and Canada. It was released for PlayStation 2, GameCube, and Microsoft Windows.

== Gameplay ==
Players are able to race in different tracks using futuristic racing cars shaped like Formula One cars.

== Reception ==
Reception

Review score
| Publication | Score |
|---|---|
| PSM3 | 23/100 |
