= Spirou: The Robot Invasion =

2000 video game

- Developer: Planet Interactive Development
- Producer: Ubi Soft
- Platform: Game Boy Color
- Release: 14 November 2000
- Genres: Puzzle, Platformer
- Mode: Single-player

Spirou: The Robot Invasion (released in French-speaking countries as Spirou: La Panique mécanique) is a 2000 Game Boy Color game developed by Planet Interactive Development and produced by Ubi Soft. The game is based upon the eponymous character of the Belgian comic strip magazine Spirou, and is a follow-up to the 1996 Game Boy title of the same name.

== Gameplay ==
A screenshot of Spirou: The Robot Invasion depicting the side-scrolling platformer gameplay.

Spirou: The Robot Invasion is a side-scrolling platformer that features 18 levels across 10 worlds, in which the player is tasked to destroy a horde of robots. The game features a comic strip presentation based on the source material, with the levels based on settings featured in the comics themselves.

== Reception ==
Reception

Review scores
Publication	Score
Computer and Video Games	3/5
Video Games (DE)	4/5
Game Boy Official Magazine	82%
Total Game Boy	86%
Game Boy Xtreme	80%

Spirou: The Robot Invasion received generally positive reviews. Critics praised the visual presentation of the game, with Nick Roberts of Total Game Boy complimenting the "detailed graphics" and "bright colourful levels". Critics of the game disliked the difficulty of the game. Computer and Video Games stated "the one real problem is that you're forced to restart the entire level when you lose the life". Similarly, Game Boy Official Magazine stated "this odd platformer looks great and the bosses are impressive, but that's where the fun stops. Spirou is very unforgiving and you'll be back at the start if you slip up."
