= Ubisoft Barcelona =

Spanish video game developer

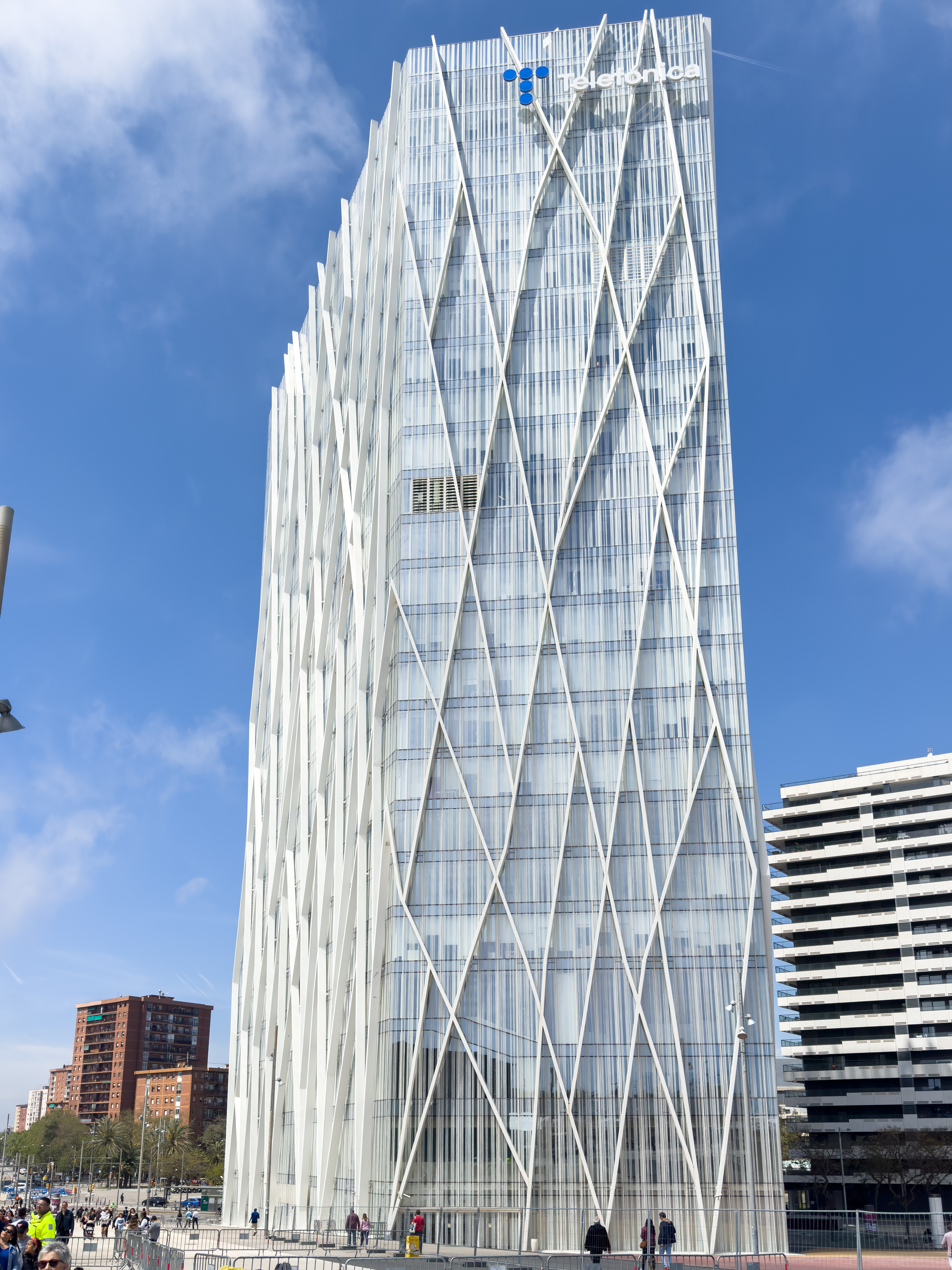
- Exterior view of the Ubisoft Barcelona studio in Torre Diagonal ZeroZero, Barcelona
- Type: Subsidiary
- Industry: Video game industry
- Founded: 1998; 28 years ago
- Headquarters: Diagonal ZeroZero, Barcelona, Spain
- Key people: Javier Capel; Marie-Thérèse Cordon
- Owner: Ubisoft
- Number of employees: ~180 (2025)
- Parent: Ubisoft
- Divisions: Ubisoft Barcelona Mobile S.L.U.
- Website: www.ubisoft.com/en-US/studio/barcelona.aspx

Ubisoft Barcelona (formerly Ubi Soft Barcelona) is a Spanish video game developer based in Sant Cugat del Vallès, Spain, and operated by parent company Ubisoft. A division of the studio, Ubisoft Barcelona Mobile, is based in Barcelona, Spain. The division was acquired from Digital Chocolate under the name Digital Chocolate Barcelona in 2013.

== History ==
Ubisoft Barcelona was founded in 1994 by María Teresa Cordón. Initially, it operated as a distribution subsidiary of Ubisoft, and in 1998 the studio opened its doors as Ubi Soft Barcelona. It was renamed Ubi Studios España, becoming a video game development studio.

From then on, the studio began developing video games and became renowned for researching and developing new peripherals, consoles, and technology. Some of the first most popular titles developed are Monster 4x4: World Circuit, launch title for the Wii, Your Shape the first USB camera enabled game for Wii with motion tracking, and MotionSports, a launch title for Microsoft's Kinect peripheral for Xbox 360.

The studio was renamed to Ubisoft Barcelona in 2004. Since then it has worked on its own projects, such as motion-tracking technology for the Wii, and it has been involved as a support studio on famous franchises such as Tom Clancy's Ghost Recon, Assassin's Creed, Tom Clancy's Rainbow Six Siege or Star Trek: Bridge Crew on virtual reality.

The first major project the studio co-developed was Tom Clancy's Ghost Recon Advanced Warfighter for March 2006, working alongside Red Storm Entertainment and four other Ubisoft studios to bring the game to PC and consoles. The game received a score of 90/100 on Metacritic and won BAFTA awards for Best Game of the Year and Best Technical Achievement. They also collaborated on the development of Tom Clancy's Ghost Recon Advanced Warfighter 2 in March 2007.

In October 2013, Just Dance 2014 was released. This rhythm game from the Just Dance series was developed by Ubisoft Paris in collaboration with Ubisoft Barcelona and four other Ubisoft studios. The game received a Metacritic score of 79/100 and a rating of 8/10 from IGN, Vandal, and 3DJuegos.

On September 24, 2013, Ubisoft acquired the Barcelona division of the American company Digital Chocolate, rebranding it as Ubisoft Barcelona Mobile, a studio dedicated to developing mobile video games.

In November 2014, Assassin's Creed: Unity was released. This action-adventure stealth game from the Assassin's Creed series was developed by Ubisoft Montreal in collaboration with Ubisoft Barcelona and ten other Ubisoft studios. The game won Outstanding Performance in a Video Game at the ACTRA Awards, Best Character Animation in a Video Game at the Annie Awards, and Best Technical Achievement and Best Art Direction at the NAVGTR Awards. It received an overall score of 72/100 on Metacritic and an 8.5/10 from IGN.

In February 2014, Watch Dogs was released, an open-world action-adventure game developed by Ubisoft Montreal in collaboration with Ubisoft Barcelona and three other Ubisoft studios. The title led Ubisoft Montreal to win Studio of the Year at the Golden Joystick Awards, and it received an 80/100 on Metacritic and an 8.7/10 from IGN.

In October 2015, Assassin's Creed: Syndicate was released, developed by Ubisoft Quebec in collaboration with Ubisoft Barcelona and nine other Ubisoft studios. The game was nominated for Best Action-Adventure Game at The Game Awards, Outstanding Achievement in Video Game Writing at the WGA Awards, and received three nominations in various categories at the BAFTA Games Awards. It also received a 78/100 on Metacritic and an 8.7/10 from IGN.

On December 1, 2015, Tom Clancy's Rainbow Six: Siege was released. This tactical shooter from the Tom Clancy's Rainbow Six series was developed by Ubisoft Montreal in collaboration with Ubisoft Barcelona, who are actively responsible for gameplay balance, the game system, and customizable elements. The title has been a commercial success, receiving a score of 79/100 on Metacritic and a 10/10 from GameSpot. In February 2022, it surpassed 80 million players across all platforms, and a version for Android and iOS was announced on April 5.

On November 10, 2020, Assassin's Creed: Valhalla was released, developed by Ubisoft Montreal in collaboration with Ubisoft Barcelona and 13 other Ubisoft studios. In Barcelona, they were responsible for everything involving final bosses, including design, combat, abilities, the event, and the environment, alongside Animus Anomalies, puzzles, and parkour. The title was nominated for Innovation in Accessibility and Best Action-Adventure Game at The Game Awards, Outstanding Video Game at the GLAAD Media Awards, and received seven nominations for the NAVGTR Awards, including Game of the Year. It achieved a score of 84/100 on Metacritic and a 9/10 from IGN. The game broke sales and active player records compared to previous titles in the Assassin's Creed series, becoming one of the most profitable titles in Ubisoft's history.

In July 2026, Ubisoft released Assassin's Creed Black Flag Resynced, a remake of 2013 Assassin's Creed IV: Black Flag, in which Ubisoft Barcelona was the responsible to build the underwater levels and swimming systems, several locations, several main and side quests, bosses and enemy AI. Shortly after release, the entire Assassin's Creed development team was laid off, triggering several days of protests. The title sold 2 million copies on its first 24 hours, and received the best Metacritic scores since the original Black Flag was released.

== Games developed ==
Title	Year	Platform(s)	Ref.
Pro Rally 2001	2000	Microsoft Windows	
Pro Rally 2002	2002	Microsoft Windows, PlayStation 2, GameCube	
Monster Jam: Maximum Destruction	2002	GameCube	
Monster 4x4: Masters of Metal	2003	PlayStation 2, GameCube	
Monster 4x4: World Circuit	2006	Xbox, Wii	
Tom Clancy's Ghost Recon Advanced Warfighter	2006	Xbox 360	
Tom Clancy's Ghost Recon Advanced Warfighter 2	2007	Xbox 360, PlayStation 3	
Cosmic Family	2007	Wii	
Driver: Parallel Lines	2007	Wii	
Emergency Heroes	2008	Wii	
My Fitness Coach	2008	Wii	
Your Shape	2009	Wii, Microsoft Windows	
Party Night	2010	Wii, PlayStation 3	
MotionSports	2010	Xbox 360	
The Adventures of Tintin: The Secret of the Unicorn	2011	Nintendo 3DS	
ESPN Sports Connection	2012	Wii U	
Just Dance 2014	2013	Xbox 360, Xbox One	
Rabbids Invasion: The Interactive TV Show	2014	PlayStation 4, Xbox One, Xbox 360	
Shape Up	2014	Xbox One	
Assassin's Creed Unity	2014	PlayStation 4, Xbox One, Microsoft Windows	
Watch Dogs	2015	PlayStation 3, PlayStation 4, Xbox 360, Xbox One, Microsoft Windows	
Assassin's Creed Syndicate	2015	PlayStation 4, Xbox One, Microsoft Windows	
Tom Clancy's Rainbow Six Siege	2015	PlayStation 4, Xbox One, Microsoft Windows	
Star Trek: Bridge Crew	2017	PlayStation 4, Microsoft Windows	
Assassin's Creed III Remastered	2019	Microsoft Windows, PlayStation 4, Xbox One, Nintendo Switch	
Assassin's Creed: Valhalla	2020	Microsoft Windows, PlayStation 4, PlayStation 5, Xbox One, Xbox Series X and Series S, Google Stadia	
Tom Clancy's Rainbow Six Siege X	2025	Microsoft Windows, PlayStation 4, PlayStation 5, Xbox One, Xbox Series X and Series S	
Assassin's Creed Black Flag Resynced	2026	PlayStation 5, Windows, Xbox Series X/S	
Beyond Good & Evil 2	TBA	TBA	
