= Hell's Kitchen: The Game =

2008 video game

- Developer: Ludia
- Publisher: Ubisoft
- Platforms: Wii; Nintendo DS; Windows; Mac OS; iOS
- Release: NA: September 9, 2008 (DS, Wii); NA: September 22, 2008 (PC, Mac); AU: September 25, 2008; EU: September 26, 2008; AU: October 28, 2008 (Wii); EU: October 31, 2008 (Wii); iOS; January 28, 2009
- Genre: Simulation
- Modes: Single-player, multiplayer

Hell's Kitchen: The Game is a time management cooking video game based on the reality competition show of the same name. It was developed by Ludia and published by Ubisoft. It features the host of the show, Gordon Ramsay, as the A.I. and places the player as a chef under his guidance, while serving customers at the restaurant. It was initially released in September 2008 on the Nintendo DS, the Nintendo Wii, Microsoft Windows, and Mac OS.

The game received mixed reviews, with it being praised for the enjoyment, but scolded for the reported poor controls and the short length. Ludia conceived the game after the release of its video game version of The Price Is Right. Shortly after Hell's Kitchen was released, it was followed by Ludia's next game, Where's Waldo? The Fantastic Journey.

== Gameplay ==
There are two basic modes to Hell's Kitchen, Career and Arcade. In Career mode, the player builds their diner into a five-star, prestigious restaurant. As their rank increases, so do the star rating, recipes and difficulty. Career mode takes place over 36 days, in which the player can earn 5 unique ranks from Dishwasher, Apprentice, Junior Cook, Cook and Senior Chef. In levels the player is rated on a scale of 0-5 stars; if they get 0 stars, they lose the round and Ramsay exclaims "Do not touch another thing in this kitchen!" The game mainly focuses on quality of food and is used to calm impatient customers. After completing each level, Ramsay awards the player with a free recipe from his own with 35 in total. The jobs completed in the game include cooking, serving, waiting and showing people to tables.

There are also Kitchen Tests that take place every Monday. In these tests, the player has to complete a challenge from Ramsay and use both Team Red and Team Blue kitchens (it is possible to cook two meals simultaneously).

In arcade mode, the player must complete every recipe in time. If the player fails this, Ramsay will become infuriated and close the restaurant.

Much like in the real show, Ramsay may verbally abuse the player if they fail a task, sometimes using profane language (although censored).

== Development ==
Ludia first started development on October 25, 2007, when Granada America allowed the Hell's Kitchen property to Ludia.

The game was intended to be released to coincide with the fourth season of the Hell's Kitchen TV show in 2008.

== Marketing and release ==
When promoting the game, Tony Key, the vice president of marketing and sales praised the game's development and the involvement of Gordon Ramsay with the game.

After release, some players wanted a less tame Hell's Kitchen game. In response, Ludia released a limited "Uncensored" version for download that was only available until the finale of the show in July 2008.

== Reception ==
Reception

Aggregate score
Aggregator	Score		
Aggregator	DS	PC	Wii
Metacritic	48/100	50/100	57/100

Review scores
Publication	Score		
Publication	DS	PC	Wii
Eurogamer	6/10	N/A	N/A
IGN	5/10	5/10	N/A
NGamer	N/A	N/A	49%
Official Nintendo Magazine	21%	N/A	N/A
Variety	N/A	N/A	(average)

The Wii and PC versions received "mixed" reviews, while the DS version received "generally unfavorable reviews", according to the review aggregation website Metacritic.
