= Monster 4x4: World Circuit =

2006 video game

Monster 4x4 World Circuit
- Developer(s): Ubisoft Barcelona
- Publisher(s): Ubisoft
- Series: Monster 4x4
- Platform(s): Xbox (Note: The Xbox version of this game is not compatible with Xbox 360, Xbox One or Xbox Series X.); Nintendo Wii
- Release: Xbox: NA: March 23, 2006; Wii: NA: November 19, 2006; AU: December 7, 2006; EU: December 8, 2006
- Genre(s): Racing
- Mode(s): Single player, Multiplayer

Monster 4x4 World Circuit is a racing game published by Ubisoft, centering around Monster trucks. It was released on March 23, 2006 on Xbox (North America only), and later on Wii as a launch title for the system (November 19, 2006, in America, December 7, 2006, in Australia, December 8, 2006, in Europe and December 21, 2006 in Japan). It is similar to San Francisco Rush, with huge jumps and vast speed. The game is a sequel to Monster 4x4: Masters of Metal, although it lacks the Monster Jam license. A sequel developed by Ubisoft Reflections, entitled Monster 4x4: Stunt Racer, was released for the Wii in 2009.

== Steering wheel accessory ==
Ubisoft revealed a steering wheel shell for the Wii Remote, as an accessory bundled with the game. The peripheral steering wheel, created by Thrustmaster as the first-ever one for the Wii a few years before Nintendo's Wii Wheel, is controlled by tilting the wheel forward to use nitros and backwards to brake/slow down. Also, when on a ramp, if the player thrusts the shell forward or in any other direction, they will perform a stunt from the ramp. Other games may make use of this peripheral as well when using the same controls.

== Reception ==
Reception

Aggregate scores
Aggregator	Score
GameRankings	(Wii) 54.18% (Xbox) 50.82%
Metacritic	(Wii) 51/100 (Xbox) 47/100

Review scores
Publication	Score
Eurogamer	4/10
GamePro	3.25/5
GameSpot	(Xbox) 4.7/10 (Wii) 4/10
GameTrailers	6.7/10
GameZone	(Wii) 7/10 (Xbox) 4.7/10
IGN	(Wii) 4.8/10 (Xbox) 4.2/10
Nintendo Power	6.5/10
Official Xbox Magazine (US)	6/10
PALGN	4/10
TeamXbox	5.8/10

The game was met with very mixed to negative reception. GameRankings and Metacritic gave it a score of 54.18% and 51 out of 100 for the Wii version, and 50.82% and 47 out of 100 for the Xbox version.

== Sequels ==
Two additional Monster 4x4 sequels followed World Circuit: Monster 4x4: Stunt Racer and Monster 4x4 3D. The first was developed by Ubisoft Reflections and was released exclusively on the Wii in 2009, and also came with a dedicated steering wheel accessory. Stunt Racer distinguishes itself from other Monster 4x4 titles with racetracks that are specifically designed so that highly agile movements, such as nitro-powered wall-driving, are necessary to navigate through them. The second sequel was released exclusively for the Nintendo 3DS in 2012 and attempts to take advantage of that system's autostereoscopic 3D visual system for an enhanced racing experience, while being the first game in the series to be available on a handheld game system.

== See also ==
- List of Wii games
