= X-Bladez: Inline Skater =

2002 video game

- Developers: Vision Scape Interactive (PS1); The Code Monkeys (GBA)
- Publisher: Crave Entertainment: EU: Ubi Soft
- Platforms: PlayStation; Game Boy Advance
- Release: PlayStation: UK: 22 March 2002; NA: 4 December 2002; Game Boy Advance: NA: 5 April 2002; EU: 29 March 2002
- Genre: Sports
- Modes: Single-player, multiplayer

X-Bladez: Inline Skater is a 2002 sports video game developed by Vision Scape Interactive and published by Crave Entertainment for the PlayStation. A version for the Game Boy Advance was developed by The Code Monkeys. Upon release, X-Bladez received negative reviews, with critics citing its simplistic design and the difficulty involved in completing tricks.

== Gameplay ==
Gameplay screenshot of X-Bladez.

X-Bladez is an extreme sports game in which players compete in aggressive inline skating races over thirteen tracks based in five different countries. Races are held in Tour Mode, involving a series of races, Time Mode, timed races, and a free-form Practice Mode. Players perform flips, spins, and grinds across slalom and circuit courses to finish in the first place. Players can collect and use power-ups across levels, including boosts for speed. The game features a Shop for players to upgrade their skates and wheels to improve performance in acceleration, top speed, balance and cornering.

== Reception ==
Reception

Review scores
Publication	Score	
Publication	GBA	PS
Consoles +		20%
Nintendo Power	2.3/5	
Official U.S. PlayStation Magazine		0.5/5
MAN!AC	16%	20%

X-Bladez received negative reviews from critics. Joe Rybicki of Official U.S. PlayStation Magazine dismissed the PlayStation version as a "simple game for kids", stating the tricks were "much harder to pull off" compared to other titles. Describing the Game Boy Advance title as more of a "racing game", Nintendo Power stated that "despite the danger element, X-Bladez doesn't feel like an extreme sport". German magazine MAN!AC lambasted both versions, stating the PlayStation version had "completely uninspired" design, "stupid opponents" and "cumbersome" controls, and the GBA title had "lousy visuals, dingy sound and dull controls" and was "ugly, boring, and without any appeal". Console+ recommended readers avoid the game, citing its "pitiful" graphics, simplistic gameplay, tricks, and difficulty.
