= Tork: Prehistoric Punk =

2005 platform video game

- Developer: Tiwak
- Publisher: Ubisoft
- Platform: Xbox
- Release: NA: January 12, 2005
- Genre: Platform
- Mode: Single-player

Tork: Prehistoric Punk is a 2005 platform video game developed by Tiwak and published by Ubisoft for the Xbox. It was only released in North America.

In the game, players control the title character as he fights back against an evil sorcerer who is trying to destroy his world. He is a shapeshifter who travels through time to change history, transforming into three "spirit" animals along the way: a squirrel, a Yeti, and an armadillo. Various periods from the Stone Age to the fictitious "Age of Fantastical Machines" are represented.

== Development ==
Developed by Tiwak, a group founded by former Ubisoft Montpellier employees, Tork was originally planned to be published by Microsoft Studios for release in 2004. However, following Ed Fries' departure from the company, Microsoft dropped the game (though retained the rights to Tork intellectual property). On April 21, 2004, Ubisoft announced that it had acquired the publishing rights from Microsoft after purchasing Tiwak. The game was released in North America in January 2005 for the budget retail price of $19.99.

== Critical response ==
Reception

Aggregate score
Aggregator	Score
Metacritic	62/100

Review scores
Publication	Score
Electronic Gaming Monthly	6.17/10
Game Informer	6/10
GameSpot	5.3/10
GameSpy	2.5/5
GameZone	6.9/10
IGN	6.4/10
Official Xbox Magazine (US)	7.6/10
TeamXbox	6.1/10
X-Play	2/5
Detroit Free Press	2/4

The game received "mixed or average" reviews, according to the review aggregation website Metacritic.
