= Dark Planet: Battle for Natrolis =

2002 video game

- Developer: Creative Edge Software
- Publisher: Ubi Soft
- Platform: Microsoft Windows
- Release: NA: March 21, 2002; EU: 2002
- Genre: Real-time strategy
- Mode: Single-player

Dark Planet: Battle for Natrolis is a real-time strategy video game developed by Creative Edge Software and published by Ubi Soft for Microsoft Windows in 2002.

== Gameplay ==
Dark Planet: Battle for Natrolis is a real-time strategy game.

== Reception ==
Reception

Aggregate score
Aggregator	Score
Metacritic	59/100

Review scores
Publication	Score
4Players	53%
AllGame	2.5/5
Computer Gaming World	3/5
Game Informer	7.5/10
GameSpot	5.6/10
GameSpy	62%
GameZone	7.2/10
IGN	7.5/10
PC Gamer (US)	55%

The game received "mixed" reviews according to the review aggregation website Metacritic.
