= List of Wii games =

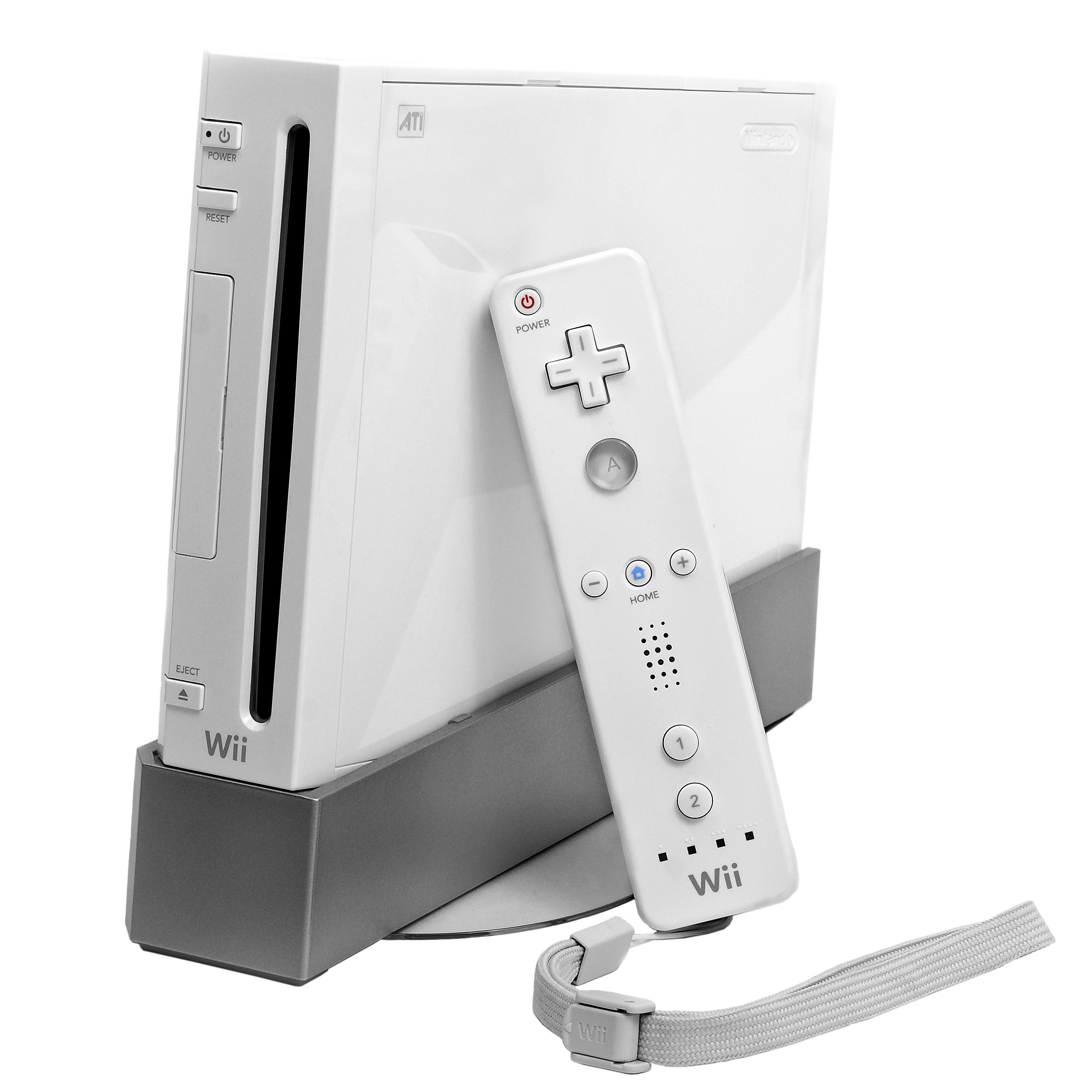
The Wii

The Wii is Nintendo's fifth home video game console, released during the seventh generation of video games. It is the successor to the GameCube, and was first launched in North America on November 19, 2006, followed by a launch in Japan and PAL regions in December 2006.

This list of Wii games documents all games released for the Wii video game console. The list of GameCube games lists the GameCube games compatible with the Wii’s backwards compatibility (although later Wii models removed the controller ports and memory card slots required to play GameCube games, they can be inserted back in through hardware modding) while the list of WiiWare games documents all of the smaller, digital only games released for the Wii. Any games originally released for other platforms that were re-released games under the Virtual Console banner are additionally documented at the List of Virtual Console games lists. Games that were announced or reported to be in development for the Wii, but never released, are documented at the list of cancelled Wii games list.

On November 19, 2006, the Wii launch was accompanied by 20 launch games. The last game releases for the Wii, Retro City Rampage DX+ (Note: An updated version of Retro City Rampage, a game previously released on WiiWare) and Shakedown: Hawaii, were released on July 9, 2020 exclusively in Europe. There are 1612 (Note: This number is always up to date by this script.) games on this list.

== Games ==
List of Wii games
Title	Developer(s)	Publisher(s)	First released	Release date (NTSC)		Release date (PAL)	
Title	Developer(s)	Publisher(s)	First released	Japan	North America	Australasia	Europe
The $1,000,000 Pyramid	Ludia	Ubisoft	2011-03-08^{NA}	Unreleased	March 8, 2011	Unreleased	Unreleased
007: Quantum of Solace	Beenox	Activision^{WW} Square Enix^{JP}	2008-10-31^{EU}	March 26, 2009	November 4, 2008	November 19, 2008	October 31, 2008
10 Minute Solution	Anchor Bay Entertainment	Activision	2010-06-29^{NA}	Unreleased	June 29, 2010	Unreleased	August 27, 2010
101-in-1 Party Megamix	Nordcurrent	Atlus^{NA} Nordcurrent^{PAL}	2009-10-27^{NA}	Unreleased	October 27, 2009	October 30, 2009	October 30, 2009
101-in-1 Sports Party Megamix	Nordcurrent	Nordcurrent^{PAL} Atlus^{NA}	2010-11-19^{EU}	Unreleased	January 13, 2011	November 19, 2010	November 19, 2010
2010 FIFA World Cup South Africa	HB Studios	EA Sports	2010-04-27^{NA}	May 13, 2010	April 27, 2010	April 29, 2010	April 30, 2010
250 Mannin no Kanken Wii de Tokoton Kanji Nou	IE Institute	IE Institute	2008-07-31^{JP}	July 31, 2008	Unreleased	Unreleased	Unreleased
428: Shibuya Scramble	Chunsoft	Sega	2008-12-04^{JP}	December 4, 2008	Unreleased	Unreleased	Unreleased
ABBA: You Can Dance	Ubisoft Paris; Ubisoft Bucharest	Ubisoft	2011-11-15^{NA}	Unreleased	November 15, 2011	November 24, 2011	November 25, 2011
AC/DC Live: Rock Band Track Pack	Harmonix; Pi Studios	MTV Games	2008-11-16^{NA}	Unreleased	November 16, 2008	March 5, 2009	March 6, 2009
Academy of Champions: Soccer	Ubisoft Vancouver	Ubisoft	2009-09-03^{AUS}	Unreleased	November 3, 2009	September 3, 2009	September 4, 2009
ACB Total 2010/2011	Korner Entertainment	Sherwood Media	2011-03-03^{EU}	Unreleased	Unreleased	Unreleased	March 3, 2011
Action Girlz Racing	Data Design Interactive	Data Design Interactive^{PAL} Conspiracy Entertainment^{NA}	2007-10-26^{EU}	Unreleased	January 29, 2008	January 8, 2008	October 26, 2007
Active Life: Explorer; Family Trainer: Treasure Adventure^{EU}	h.a.n.d.	Namco Bandai Games	2010-10-19^{NA}	October 21, 2010	October 19, 2010	Unreleased	October 22, 2010
Active Life: Extreme Challenge; Family Trainer: Extreme Challenge^{PAL}	Tose	Namco Bandai Games	2009-08-11^{NA}	December 10, 2009	August 11, 2009	October 15, 2009	September 25, 2009
Active Life: Magical Carnival; Family Trainer: Magical Carnival^{EU}	Ganbarion	Namco Bandai Games	2011-10-25^{NA}	December 15, 2011	October 25, 2011	Unreleased	November 18, 2011
Active Life: Outdoor Challenge; Family Trainer^{PAL}	h.a.n.d.	Namco Bandai Games	2008-05-29^{JP}	May 29, 2008	September 9, 2008	May 28, 2009	August 9, 2008
Adibou et les saisons magiques	Eko Software	Mindscape	2009-11-01^{EU}	Unreleased	Unreleased	Unreleased	November 1, 2009
The Adventures of Tintin: The Secret of the Unicorn; The Adventures of Tintin: The Game^{NA}	Ubisoft Montpellier	Ubisoft	2011-10-21^{EU}	Unreleased	December 6, 2011	December 1, 2011	October 21, 2011
AFL	Wicked Witch Software	Tru Blu Entertainment	2011-05-19^{AUS}	Unreleased	Unreleased	May 19, 2011	Unreleased
Agatha Christie: And Then There Were None	AWE Productions	The Adventure Company	2008-02-08^{EU}	Unreleased	February 25, 2008	April 24, 2008	February 8, 2008
Agatha Christie: Evil Under the Sun	AWE Productions	The Adventure Company	2008-11-18^{NA}	Unreleased	November 18, 2008	December 5, 2008	December 5, 2008
Agent Hugo: Hula Holiday	Attractive Games	NDS Software	2008-12-06^{EU}	Unreleased	Unreleased	Unreleased	December 6, 2008
Agent Hugo: Lemoon Twist	Coyote Console	ITE Media	2008-05-29^{EU}	Unreleased	Unreleased	Unreleased	May 29, 2008
Akko de Pon! Ikasama Hourouki	Success	Success	2008-07-03^{JP}	July 3, 2008	Unreleased	Unreleased	Unreleased
Aladdin Magic Racer	Hydravision Entertainment	Red Wagon Games	2010-12-15^{EU}	Unreleased	November 29, 2011	Unreleased	December 15, 2010
Alan Hansen's Sports Challenge	Oxygen Studios	Oxygen Games	2007-12-07^{EU}	Unreleased	Unreleased	Unreleased	December 7, 2007
Alice in Wonderland	Étranges Libellules	Disney Interactive Studios	2010-03-02^{NA}	Unreleased	March 2, 2010	March 4, 2010	March 5, 2010
Alien Monster Bowling League	Perpetual FX Creative	Destineer^{NA} The Games Company^{EU}	2009-10-20^{NA}	Unreleased	October 20, 2009	Unreleased	June 29, 2010
Alien Syndrome	Totally Games	Sega	2007-07-24^{NA}	Unreleased	July 24, 2007	September 13, 2007	September 7, 2007
Aliens in the Attic	Revistronic	Playlogic Entertainment	2009-08-04^{NA}	Unreleased	August 4, 2009	Unreleased	August 6, 2009
All Round Hunter	SIMS	505 Games	2010-06-24^{AUS}	Unreleased	Unreleased	June 24, 2010	June 25, 2010
All Star Cheer Squad; All Star Cheerleader^{PAL}	Gorilla Systems	THQ	2008-10-27^{NA}	Unreleased	October 27, 2008	November 13, 2008	November 14, 2008
All Star Cheer Squad 2 All Star Cheerleader 2^{PAL}	Gorilla Systems	THQ	2009-10-27^{NA}	Unreleased	October 27, 2009	November 5, 2009	November 6, 2009
All Star Karate	Blitz Games	THQ	2010-04-20^{NA}	Unreleased	April 20, 2010	May 21, 2010	May 21, 2010
Alone in the Dark	Hydravision Entertainment	Atari Interactive	2008-06-20^{EU}	Unreleased	June 23, 2008	June 26, 2008	June 20, 2008
Alvin and the Chipmunks	Sensory Sweep Studios	Brash Entertainment	2007-12-04^{NA}	Unreleased	December 4, 2007	January 11, 2008	December 7, 2007
Alvin and the Chipmunks: Chipwrecked	Behaviour Interactive	Majesco	2011-11-15^{NA}	Unreleased	November 15, 2011	Unreleased	November 25, 2011
Alvin and the Chipmunks: The Squeakquel	ImaginEngine	Majesco	2009-12-01^{NA}	Unreleased	December 1, 2009	Unreleased	December 11, 2009
The Amazing Race	Ludia	Ubisoft	2010-11-01^{NA}	Unreleased	November 1, 2010	Unreleased	Unreleased
The Amazing Spider-Man	Beenox	Activision	2012-06-26^{NA}	Unreleased	June 26, 2012	June 27, 2012	June 29, 2012
America's Next Top Model	Neopica	Conspiracy Entertainment^{NA} DTP Entertainment^{EU}	2010-06-01^{NA}	Unreleased	June 1, 2010	Unreleased	October 8, 2010
American Mensa Academy; Mensa Academy^{PAL}	Silverball Studios	Square Enix^{PAL} Maximum Games^{NA}	2012-07-27^{PAL}	Unreleased	November 16, 2012	July 27, 2012	July 27, 2012
AMF Bowling Pinbusters!	Atomic Planet Entertainment	Mud Duck Productions	2007-11-20^{NA}	Unreleased	November 20, 2007	March 14, 2008	March 14, 2008
AMF Bowling World Lanes	Frontline Studios	Vir2L Studios	2008-11-18^{NA}	Unreleased	November 18, 2008	Unreleased	Unreleased
And-Kensaku	Shift	Nintendo	2010-04-29^{JP}	April 29, 2010	Unreleased	Unreleased	Unreleased
Andrew Lloyd Webber Musicals: Sing and Dance	Tubby Games	Tubby Games	2012-11-09^{EU}	Unreleased	Unreleased	January 31, 2013	November 9, 2012
Angry Birds Star Wars	Exient Entertainment	Activision	2013-10-29^{NA}	Unreleased	October 29, 2013	Unreleased	November 1, 2013
Angry Birds Trilogy	Fun Labs	Activision	2013-08-13^{NA}	Unreleased	August 13, 2013	Unreleased	August 16, 2013
Animal Crossing: City Folk; Animal Crossing: Let's Go to the City^{PAL}	Nintendo EAD	Nintendo	2008-11-16^{NA}	November 20, 2008	November 16, 2008	December 4, 2008	December 5, 2008
Animal Kingdom: Wildlife Expedition	Success	Success^{JP} Natsume Inc.^{NA} Nobilis^{EU}	2008-05-22^{JP}	May 22, 2008	September 22, 2009	Unreleased	February 26, 2010
Animal Planet: Vet Life	Big Blue Bubble	Activision	2009-09-22^{NA}	Unreleased	September 22, 2009	Unreleased	November 18, 2009
Anime Slot Revolution: Pachi-Slot Kidou Senshi Gundam II – Ai Senshi Hen	Yamasa Entertainment	Namco Bandai Games	2007-12-27^{JP}	December 27, 2007	Unreleased	Unreleased	Unreleased
Anno: Create A New World; Dawn of Discovery^{NA}	Keen Games	Ubisoft	2009-05-22^{EU}	Unreleased	June 23, 2009	June 25, 2009	May 22, 2009
Another Code: R – A Journey into Lost Memories	Cing	Nintendo	2009-02-05^{JP}	February 5, 2009	Unreleased	Unreleased	June 26, 2009
Anpanman Niko Niko Party	Agatsuma Entertainment	Agatsuma Entertainment	2010-11-25^{JP}	November 25, 2010	Unreleased	Unreleased	Unreleased
The Ant Bully	Artificial Mind and Movement	Midway	2006-12-05^{NA}	Unreleased	December 5, 2006	December 10, 2006	January 17, 2007
Anubis II	Data Design Interactive	Data Design Interactive^{PAL} Conspiracy Entertainment^{NA}	2007-09-21^{EU}	Unreleased	September 25, 2007	September 27, 2007	September 21, 2007
Aqua Panic!	Eko Software	Neko Entertainment^{EU} XS Games^{NA}	2009-05-29^{EU}	Unreleased	September 25, 2009	Unreleased	May 29, 2009
Aquarius Baseball		Coca-Cola Japan	2007-09-01^{JP}	September 1, 2007	Unreleased	Unreleased	Unreleased
Arc Rise Fantasia	Imageepoch; Marvelous Entertainment	Marvelous Entertainment^{JP} Ignition Entertainment^{NA}	2009-06-04^{JP}	June 4, 2009	July 27, 2010	Unreleased	Unreleased
Arcade Shooting Gallery	CyberPlanet Interactive	Zoo Games	2009-11-09^{NA}	Unreleased	November 9, 2009	Unreleased	Unreleased
Arcade Zone	Ivolgamus	Activision	2009-09-08^{NA}	Unreleased	September 8, 2009	Unreleased	October 30, 2009
Arctic Tale	Atomic Planet Entertainment	DSI Games^{NA} Zoo Digital Publishing^{PAL}	2007-10-10^{NA}	Unreleased	October 10, 2007	February 28, 2007	February 8, 2008
Are You Smarter Than a 5th Grader?: Back to School	ImaginEngine	THQ	2010-11-02^{NA}	Unreleased	November 2, 2010	Unreleased	Unreleased
Are You Smarter Than a 5th Grader?: Game Time	ImaginEngine	THQ	2009-10-26^{NA}	Unreleased	October 26, 2009	Unreleased	Unreleased
Are You Smarter Than a 5th Grader?: Make the Grade	ImaginEngine	THQ	2008-10-20^{NA}	Unreleased	October 20, 2008	Unreleased	Unreleased
Armin van Buuren: In the Mix	Transgaming Technologies	Foreign Media Games	2010-11-12^{EU}	Unreleased	Unreleased	Unreleased	November 12, 2010
Army Men: Soldiers of Misfortune	Big Blue Bubble	Zoo Games	2008-10-07^{NA}	Unreleased	October 7, 2008	Unreleased	February 27, 2009
Army Rescue	CyberPlanet Interactive	UFO Interactive Games	2009-10-20^{NA}	Unreleased	October 20, 2009	Unreleased	Unreleased
Around the World in 50 Games	JV Games	Zoo Games	2010-10-14^{NA}	Unreleased	October 14, 2010	Unreleased	Unreleased
Arthur and the Revenge of Maltazard	Phoenix Studio	Ubisoft	2010-09-24^{EU}	Unreleased	Unreleased	Unreleased	September 24, 2010
Ashes Cricket 2009; Cricket^{AUS}	Gusto Games	Codemasters	2009-08-07^{EU}	Unreleased	Unreleased	November 5, 2009	August 7, 2009
Asterix at the Olympic Games	Étranges Libellules	Atari Europe	2007-11-09^{EU}	Unreleased	Unreleased	February 29, 2008	November 9, 2007
Astro Boy: The Video Game	High Voltage Software	D3 Publisher	2009-10-20^{NA}	Unreleased	October 20, 2009	October 29, 2009	February 5, 2010
Atrévete a Soñar	Sabarasa Entertainment	Slang Publishing	2010-01-01^{NA}	Unreleased	January 1, 2010	Unreleased	Unreleased
Attack of the Movies 3D	Panic Button	Majesco	2010-05-18^{NA}	Unreleased	May 18, 2010	Unreleased	Unreleased
ATV Quad Kings	Beyond Reality	Zoo Games	2009-08-11^{NA}	Unreleased	August 11, 2009	Unreleased	2009
Avatar: The Last Airbender; Avatar: The Legend of Aang^{PAL}	THQ Studio Australia	THQ	2006-11-19^{NA}	Unreleased	November 19, 2006	February 8, 2007	February 9, 2007
Avatar: The Last Airbender – The Burning Earth; Avatar: The Legend of Aang – The Burning Earth^{PAL}	THQ Studio Australia	THQ	2007-10-17^{NA}	Unreleased	October 17, 2007	November 1, 2007	October 26, 2007
Avatar: The Last Airbender – Into the Inferno; Avatar: The Legend of Aang – Into the Inferno^{PAL}	THQ Studio Australia	Play THQ	2008-10-13^{NA}	Unreleased	October 13, 2008	October 30, 2008	October 31, 2008
Baby & Me	Sonic Powered	Pub Company	2009-11-10^{PAL}	Unreleased	Unreleased	November 10, 2009	November 10, 2009
Babysitting Mama	Cooking Mama Limited	Majesco^{NA} 505 Games^{PAL} Office Create^{JP}	2010-11-05^{NA}	December 2, 2010	November 5, 2010	November 11, 2010	November 12, 2010
The Bachelor: The Video Game	Ludia	Warner Bros. Interactive Entertainment	2010-10-06^{NA}	Unreleased	October 6, 2010	Unreleased	Unreleased
Back to the Future: The Game	Telltale Games	Telltale Games^{NA} Deep Silver^{EU}	2011-10-25^{NA}	Unreleased	October 25, 2011	Unreleased	May 4, 2012
Backyard Baseball '09	FarSight Studios	Atari	2008-06-10^{NA}	Unreleased	June 10, 2008	Unreleased	Unreleased
Backyard Baseball '10	FarSight Studios	Atari	2009-03-31^{NA}	Unreleased	March 31, 2009	Unreleased	Unreleased
Backyard Football	FarSight Studios	Atari	2007-10-23^{NA}	Unreleased	October 23, 2007	Unreleased	Unreleased
Backyard Football '09	FarSight Studios	Atari	2008-10-21^{NA}	Unreleased	October 21, 2008	Unreleased	Unreleased
Backyard Football '10	FarSight Studios	Atari	2009-10-20^{NA}	Unreleased	October 20, 2009	Unreleased	Unreleased
Backyard Sports: Rookie Rush	HB Studios	Atari	2010-10-22^{NA}	Unreleased	October 22, 2010	Unreleased	Unreleased
Backyard Sports: Sandlot Sluggers	HB Studios	Atari	2010-05-25^{NA}	Unreleased	May 25, 2010	Unreleased	Unreleased
Bakugan Battle Brawlers	Now Production	Activision	2009-10-20^{NA}	Unreleased	October 20, 2009	October 28, 2009	October 23, 2009
Bakugan: Defenders of the Core	Now Production	Activision	2010-10-26^{NA}	Unreleased	October 26, 2010	October 27, 2010	October 29, 2010
Balloon Pop; Pop!^{EU}	Dreams	UFO Interactive Games	2007-10-23^{NA}	September 4, 2008	October 23, 2007	Unreleased	February 29, 2008
Balls of Fury	Black Lantern Studios	DSI Games^{NA} Zoo Digital Publishing^{PAL}	2007-09-25^{NA}	Unreleased	September 25, 2007	October 26, 2007	October 26, 2007
Band Hero	Vicarious Visions	Activision	2009-11-03^{NA}	Unreleased	November 3, 2009	November 25, 2009	November 6, 2009
Barbie and Her Sisters: Puppy Rescue	Torus Games	Little Orbit	2015-11-03^{NA}	Unreleased	November 3, 2015	Unreleased	November 19, 2015
Barbie and the Three Musketeers	WayForward Technologies	Activision	2009-11-03^{NA}	Unreleased	November 3, 2009	November 5, 2009	November 13, 2009
Barbie as the Island Princess	Ivolgamus	Activision	2007-10-30^{NA}	Unreleased	October 30, 2007	December 19, 2007	December 7, 2007
Barbie Dreamhouse Party	Torus Games	Little Orbit	2013-11-12^{NA}	Unreleased	November 12, 2013	November 21, 2013	February 14, 2014
Barbie: Groom and Glam Pups	Game Machine Studios	THQ	2010-11-16^{NA}	Unreleased	November 16, 2010	November 19, 2010	November 18, 2010
Barbie Horse Adventures: Riding Camp	Pixel Tales	Activision	2008-10-21^{NA}	Unreleased	October 21, 2008	November 26, 2008	November 21, 2008
Barbie: Jet, Set & Style!	Game Machine Studios	THQ	2011-09-20^{NA}	Unreleased	September 20, 2011	September 22, 2011	September 23, 2011
Barnyard	Blue Tongue Entertainment	THQ	2006-11-30^{NA}	April 5, 2007	November 30, 2006	December 7, 2006	February 9, 2007
Baroque	Sting Entertainment	Sting Entertainment^{JP} Atlus^{NA} Rising Star Games^{EU}	2008-03-13^{JP}	March 13, 2008	April 8, 2008	Unreleased	August 15, 2008
Baseball Blast!	WayForward Technologies	2K Sports	2009-09-25^{NA}	Unreleased	September 25, 2009	Unreleased	Unreleased
Basketball Hall of Fame: Ultimate Hoops Challenge	Collision Studios	Zoo Games	2010-03-23^{NA}	Unreleased	March 23, 2010	Unreleased	Unreleased
Bass Pro Shops: The Hunt	Piranha Games	XS Games	2010-05-28^{NA}	Unreleased	May 28, 2010	Unreleased	Unreleased
Bass Pro Shops: The Hunt – Trophy Showdown	Outdoor Partners	XS Games	2011-10-19^{NA}	Unreleased	October 19, 2011	Unreleased	Unreleased
Bass Pro Shops: The Strike	Piranha Games	XS Games	2009-10-06^{NA}	Unreleased	October 6, 2009	Unreleased	Unreleased
Bass Pro Shops: The Strike – Tournament Edition	Piranha Games	XS Games	2011-10-19^{NA}	Unreleased	October 19, 2011	Unreleased	Unreleased
Batman: The Brave and the Bold – The Videogame	WayForward Technologies	Warner Bros. Interactive Entertainment	2010-09-07^{NA}	Unreleased	September 7, 2010	September 9, 2010	September 24, 2010
Battalion Wars 2	Kuju London	Nintendo	2007-10-29^{NA}	May 15, 2008	October 29, 2007	March 20, 2008	February 15, 2008
Battle of Giants: Dinosaurs Strike; Combat of Giants: Dinosaur Strike^{PAL}	Ubisoft Quebec	Ubisoft	2010-11-09^{NA}	Unreleased	November 9, 2010	November 18, 2010	November 19, 2010
Battle of the Bands	Planet Moon Studios	THQ	2008-04-21^{NA}	Unreleased	April 21, 2008	May 29, 2008	May 23, 2008
Battle Rage: Mech Conflict	Data Design Interactive	Destineer	2009-02-24^{NA}	Unreleased	February 24, 2009	Unreleased	Unreleased
Battle vs. Chess	Targem Games	TopWare Interactive	2013-05-07^{EU}	Unreleased	Unreleased	Unreleased	May 7, 2013
Battleship	Magic Pockets	Activision	2012-04-20^{EU}	Unreleased	May 15, 2012	Unreleased	April 20, 2012
Beach Fun: Summer Challenge	Sproing Interactive	RTL Sports^{EU} Zoo Games^{NA}	2009-06-18^{EU}	Unreleased	June 23, 2010	Unreleased	June 18, 2009
Beastly	Visual Impact	Storm City Games^{NA} Enjoy Gaming^{PAL}	2011-02-25^{NA}	Unreleased	February 25, 2011	August 29, 2011	August 29, 2011
The Beatles: Rock Band	Pi Studios	MTV Games	2009-09-09^{WW}	Unreleased	September 9, 2009	September 9, 2009	September 9, 2009
Bee Movie Game	Smart Bomb Interactive	Activision	2007-11-05^{NA}	Unreleased	November 5, 2007	December 5, 2007	November 16, 2007
Ben 10: Alien Force	Monkey Bar Games	D3 Publisher	2008-10-28^{NA}	Unreleased	October 28, 2008	November 20, 2008	February 16, 2009
Ben 10 Alien Force: Vilgax Attacks	Papaya Studio	D3 Publisher	2009-10-27^{NA}	Unreleased	October 27, 2009	November 26, 2009	February 12, 2010
Ben 10: Galactic Racing	Monkey Bar Games	D3 Publisher	2011-10-18^{NA}	Unreleased	October 18, 2011	November 24, 2011	November 25, 2011
Ben 10: Omniverse	Vicious Cycle Software	D3 Publisher^{NA} Namco Bandai Games^{PAL}	2012-11-13^{NA}	Unreleased	November 13, 2012	November 30, 2012	November 30, 2012
Ben 10: Omniverse 2	High Voltage Software	D3 Publisher^{NA} Namco Bandai Games^{PAL}	2013-11-05^{NA}	Unreleased	November 5, 2013	November 28, 2013	November 22, 2013
Ben 10: Protector of Earth	High Voltage Software	D3 Publisher	2007-10-30^{NA}	Unreleased	October 30, 2007	December 4, 2007	November 30, 2007
Ben 10 Ultimate Alien: Cosmic Destruction	Papaya Studio	D3 Publisher	2010-10-05^{NA}	Unreleased	October 5, 2010	February 10, 2011	January 11, 2011
Benjamin Blümchen: Törööö im Zoo	Independent Arts Software	Kiddinx Entertainment	2012-10-12^{EU}	Unreleased	Unreleased	Unreleased	October 12, 2012
Bermuda Triangle: Saving the Coral	NorthPole Studio	Storm City Games^{NA} Funbox Media^{EU}	2009-11-17^{NA}	Unreleased	November 17, 2009	Unreleased	November 25, 2011
Beyblade: Metal Fusion – Battle Fortress	Hudson Soft	Hudson Soft	2009-11-19^{JP}	November 19, 2009	November 9, 2010	Unreleased	November 12, 2010
Bibi & Tina: Das große Reiterfest	Morgen Studios	Kiddinx Entertainment	2011-10-07^{EU}	Unreleased	Unreleased	Unreleased	October 7, 2011
Bibi Blocksberg: Das große Hexenbesen-Rennen!	Nurogames	Kiddinx Entertainment	2010-08-10^{EU}	Unreleased	Unreleased	Unreleased	August 10, 2010
Bibi Blocksberg: Das große Hexenbesen-Rennen 2	Nurogames	Kiddinx Entertainment	2013-10-13^{EU}	Unreleased	Unreleased	Unreleased	October 13, 2013
Bienvenue chez les CH'TIS: Le Jeu	Mad Monkey Studio	Mindscape	2008-11-19^{EU}	Unreleased	Unreleased	Unreleased	November 19, 2008
Big Beach Sports	HB Studios	THQ	2008-06-24^{NA}	Unreleased	June 24, 2008	June 26, 2008	June 27, 2008
Big Beach Sports 2	Jet Black Games	THQ	2010-06-18^{NA}	Unreleased	June 18, 2010	June 24, 2010	June 24, 2010
Big Brain Academy: Wii Degree; Big Brain Academy for Wii^{PAL}	Nintendo EAD	Nintendo	2007-04-26^{JP}	April 26, 2007	June 11, 2007	November 8, 2007	July 20, 2007
Big Buck Hunter Pro	Play Mechanix	Crave Games	2010-09-15^{NA}	Unreleased	September 15, 2010	Unreleased	Unreleased
Big League Sports; World Championship Sports^{PAL}	Koolhaus Games	Activision	2008-11-11^{NA}	Unreleased	November 11, 2008	March 4, 2009	February 13, 2009
Big League Sports: Summer; World Championship Sports: Summer^{PAL}	Koolhaus Games	Activision	2009-06-16^{WW}	Unreleased	June 16, 2009	June 16, 2009	June 16, 2009
Big Time Rush: Dance Party	Black Lantern Studios	GameMill Entertainment^{NA} Funbox Media^{EU}	2012-11-12^{NA}	Unreleased	November 12, 2012	Unreleased	October 18, 2013
Bigfoot: Collision Course	Q90 Games; Alpine Studios	Zoo Games	2008-12-05^{NA}	Unreleased	December 5, 2008	July 31, 2009}	July 31, 2009
Bigfoot: King of Crush	Torus Games	Zoo Games	2011-05-31^{NA}	Unreleased	May 31, 2011	Unreleased	Unreleased
The Biggest Loser	Blitz Games	THQ	2009-10-06^{NA}	Unreleased	October 6, 2009	January 7, 2010	November 13, 2009
The Biggest Loser: Challenge	Blitz Games	THQ	2010-11-04^{NA}	Unreleased	November 4, 2010	November 18, 2010	November 12, 2010
The Bigs	Blue Castle Games	2K Sports	2007-06-25^{NA}	Unreleased	June 25, 2007	October 26, 2007	October 26, 2007
The Bigs 2	Blue Castle Games	2K Sports	2009-07-07^{NA}	Unreleased	July 7, 2009	August 28, 2009	August 28, 2009
Billy the Wizard: Rocket Broomstick Racing	Data Design Interactive	Data Design Interactive^{PAL} Conspiracy Entertainment^{NA}	2007-09-17^{EU}	Unreleased	October 5, 2007	September 27, 2007	September 17, 2007
Billy's Boot Camp: Wii de Enjoy Diet!	Rocket Company	Rocket Company	2011-04-21^{JP}	April 21, 2011	Unreleased	Unreleased	Unreleased
Bionicle Heroes	Traveller's Tales	Eidos Interactive; TT Games Publishing	2007-04-24^{NA}	Unreleased	April 24, 2007	June 1, 2007	May 25, 2007
Birthday Party Bash; It's My Birthday^{PAL}	Cat Daddy Games	2K Play	2009-06-19^{EU}	Unreleased	July 14, 2009	June 26, 2009	June 19, 2009
Bit.Trip Complete	Gaijin Games	Aksys Games^{NA} Rising Star Games^{EU}	2011-09-13^{NA}	Unreleased	September 13, 2011	Unreleased	March 16, 2012
The Black Eyed Peas Experience	Ubisoft Quebec	Ubisoft	2011-11-08^{NA}	Unreleased	November 8, 2011	November 10, 2011	November 11, 2011
Blast Works: Build, Trade, Destroy; Blast Works: Build, Fuse & Destroy^{PAL}	Budcat Creations	Majesco	2008-06-10^{NA}	Unreleased	June 10, 2008	April 30, 2009	April 3, 2009
Blazing Angels: Squadrons of WWII	Ubisoft Bucharest	Ubisoft	2007-03-20^{NA}	Unreleased	March 20, 2007	March 22, 2007	March 30, 2007
Bleach: Shattered Blade	Polygon Magic	Sega	2006-12-14^{JP}	December 14, 2006	October 9, 2007	February 28, 2008	February 28, 2008
Bleach: Versus Crusade	Treasure	Sega	2008-12-18^{JP}	December 18, 2008	Unreleased	Unreleased	Unreleased
Block Party	Ivolgamus	Activision	2008-11-11^{NA}	Unreleased	November 11, 2008	March 4, 2009	February 13, 2009
Bob the Builder: Festival of Fun	Halch	Blast! Entertainment	2009-05-22^{EU}	Unreleased	Unreleased	July 30, 2009	May 22, 2009
Bolt	Avalanche Software	Disney Interactive Studios	2008-11-18^{NA}	Unreleased	November 18, 2008	December 18, 2008	February 13, 2009
Bomberman Blast	Hudson Soft	Hudson Soft	2008-09-25^{JP}	September 25, 2008	Unreleased	Unreleased	Unreleased
Bomberman Land	Racjin	Hudson Soft^{JP/NA} Rising Star Games^{PAL}	2007-03-08^{JP}	March 8, 2007	January 29, 2008	March 20, 2008	March 14, 2008
Boogie	EA Montreal	Electronic Arts	2007-08-07^{NA}	Unreleased	August 7, 2007	August 30, 2007	August 31, 2007
Boogie Superstar	EA Montreal	Electronic Arts	2008-10-14^{NA}	Unreleased	October 14, 2008	October 16, 2008	October 17, 2008
Boom Blox	EA Los Angeles	Electronic Arts	2008-05-06^{NA}	July 17, 2008	May 6, 2008	May 8, 2008	May 9, 2008
Boom Blox Bash Party	EA Los Angeles	Electronic Arts	2009-05-19^{NA}	Unreleased	May 19, 2009	June 18, 2009	May 29, 2009
Boot Camp Academy	NAPS team	Ubisoft^{PAL} Zoo Games^{NA}	2010-03-04^{AU}	Unreleased	May 20, 2010	March 4, 2010	March 11, 2010
A Boy and His Blob	WayForward Technologies	Majesco	2009-10-13^{NA}	Unreleased	October 13, 2009	November 19, 2009	November 6, 2009
Bratz: Girlz Really Rock	Blitz Games	Play THQ	2008-10-13^{NA}	Unreleased	October 13, 2008	October 30, 2008	November 7, 2008
Bratz Kidz - Party; Bratz Kidz^{NA}	Neko Entertainment	The Game Factory	2008-10-30^{AUS}	Unreleased	November 11, 2008	October 30, 2008	December 5, 2008
Bratz: The Movie	Blitz Games	THQ	2007-09-24^{NA}	Unreleased	September 24, 2007	November 29, 2007	November 30, 2007
Brave	Behaviour Interactive	Disney Interactive Studios	2012-06-19^{NA}	Unreleased	June 19, 2012	June 21, 2012	July 27, 2012
Brave: A Warrior's Tale	Collision Studios	Evolved Games^{NA} SouthPeak Games^{EU}	2009-08-10^{NA}	Unreleased	August 10, 2009	Unreleased	September 28, 2009
Broken Sword: Shadow of the Templars – The Director's Cut	Revolution Software	Ubisoft	2009-03-19^{AUS}	Unreleased	March 24, 2009	March 19, 2009	March 20, 2009
Brothers in Arms: Double Time	Gearbox Software	Ubisoft	2008-09-23^{NA}	Unreleased	September 23, 2008	September 25, 2008	September 26, 2008
Brunswick Pro Bowling	Point of View	Crave Entertainment^{NA} 505 Games^{PAL}	2007-08-28^{NA}	Unreleased	August 28, 2007	September 27, 2007	September 21, 2007
Brunswick Zone Cosmic Bowling	Frontline Studios	GameMill Entertainment	2010-09-10^{NA}	Unreleased	September 10, 2010	Unreleased	Unreleased
Buck Fever	N-Fusion Interactive Entertainment	Destineer	2009-11-16^{NA}	Unreleased	November 16, 2009	Unreleased	Unreleased
Build 'n Race	Icon Games Entertainment	Zoo Games	2009-08-04^{NA}	Unreleased	August 4, 2009	Unreleased	Unreleased
Build-A-Bear Workshop: A Friend Fur All Seasons	Neko Entertainment	The Game Factory	2008-10-21^{NA}	Unreleased	October 21, 2008	September 23, 2008	November 7, 2008
Build-A-Bear Workshop: Friendship Valley	Neko Entertainment	Activision	2010-03-23^{NA}	Unreleased	March 23, 2010	Unreleased	Unreleased
Bully: Scholarship Edition	Rockstar Toronto	Rockstar Games	2008-03-04^{NA}	Unreleased	March 4, 2008	March 7, 2008	March 7, 2008
Burger Bot	CyberPlanet Interactive	Virtual Play Games	2010-05-18^{NA}	Unreleased	May 18, 2010	Unreleased	Unreleased
Burger Island	TechFront	Destineer	2009-05-01^{NA}	Unreleased	May 1, 2009	Unreleased	Unreleased
Bust-A-Move Bash! Bust-A-Move^{PAL}	Happy Happening	Majesco^{NA} 505 Games^{PAL}	2007-04-17^{NA}	Unreleased	April 17, 2007	May 17, 2007	May 11, 2007
Busy Scissors	Little Orbit	Little Orbit	2010-10-26^{NA}	Unreleased	October 26, 2010	Unreleased	March 4, 2011
Cabela's Adventure Camp	Cauldron	Activision	2011-11-01^{NA}	Unreleased	November 1, 2011	Unreleased	November 18, 2011
Cabela's African Adventures	Fun Labs	Activision	2013-10-15^{NA}	Unreleased	October 15, 2013	Unreleased	Unreleased
Cabela's Big Game Hunter	Magic Wand Productions	Activision	2007-11-13^{NA}	Unreleased	November 13, 2007	March 5, 2008	March 7, 2008
Cabela's Big Game Hunter 2010	Cauldron	Activision	2009-09-29^{NA}	Unreleased	September 29, 2009	November 23, 2010	November 19, 2010
Cabela's Big Game Hunter 2012	Cauldron	Activision	2011-09-27^{NA}	Unreleased	September 27, 2011	Unreleased	March 16, 2012
Cabela's Dangerous Hunts 2009; Cabela's Dangerous Adventures^{PAL}	Magic Wand Productions	Activision	2008-09-23^{NA}	Unreleased	September 23, 2008	March 11, 2009	March 12, 2009
Cabela's Dangerous Hunts 2011	Cauldron	Activision	2010-10-26^{NA}	Unreleased	October 26, 2010	May 6, 2011	March 23, 2011
Cabela's Dangerous Hunts 2013	Cauldron	Activision	2012-10-23^{NA}	Unreleased	October 23, 2012	Unreleased	November 2, 2012
Cabela's Hunting Expeditions	Fun Labs	Activision	2012-10-23^{NA}	Unreleased	October 23, 2012	Unreleased	Unreleased
Cabela's Legendary Adventures	Fun Labs	Activision	2008-09-09^{NA}	Unreleased	September 9, 2008	Unreleased	Unreleased
Cabela's Monster Buck Hunter	Fun Labs	Activision	2010-03-25^{NA}	Unreleased	March 25, 2010	Unreleased	Unreleased
Cabela's North American Adventures	Fun Labs	Activision	2010-09-14^{NA}	Unreleased	September 14, 2010	Unreleased	Unreleased
Cabela's Outdoor Adventures	Fun Labs	Activision	2009-09-08^{NA}	Unreleased	September 8, 2009	Unreleased	Unreleased
Cabela's Survival: Shadows of Katmai	Fun Labs	Activision	2011-11-01^{NA}	Unreleased	November 1, 2011	Unreleased	November 18, 2011
Cabela's Trophy Bucks	Magic Wand Productions	Activision	2008-06-03^{NA}	Unreleased	June 3, 2008	Unreleased	Unreleased
The Cages: Pro Style Batting Practice	Alpha Unit	Konami	2009-07-16^{JP}	July 16, 2009	July 6, 2010	Unreleased	Unreleased
Cake Mania: In the Mix!	Gorilla Systems	Majesco	2008-11-24^{NA}	Unreleased	November 24, 2008	Unreleased	July 31, 2009
Call of Duty 3	Treyarch; Exakt Entertainment	Activision	2006-11-19^{NA}	Unreleased	November 19, 2006	December 7, 2006	December 8, 2006
Call of Duty: Black Ops	Treyarch	Activision	2010-11-09^{WW}	Unreleased	November 9, 2010	November 9, 2010	November 9, 2010
Call of Duty: Modern Warfare 3	Treyarch	Activision	2011-11-08^{NA}	Unreleased	November 8, 2011	November 23, 2011	November 11, 2011
Call of Duty: Modern Warfare — Reflex Edition	Treyarch	Activision	2009-11-10^{WW}	Unreleased	November 10, 2009	November 10, 2009	November 10, 2009
Call of Duty: World at War	Treyarch; Exakt Entertainment	Activision	2008-11-11^{NA}	Unreleased	November 11, 2008	November 12, 2008	November 14, 2008
Calling	Hudson Soft	Hudson Soft	2009-11-19^{JP}	November 19, 2009	March 9, 2010	Unreleased	March 19, 2010
Calvin Tucker's Redneck: Farm Animals Racing Tournament; Calvin Tucker's Farm Animals Racing^{PAL}	Team6 Game Studios	Zoo Games^{NA} Funbox Media^{PAL}	2010-06-25^{NA}	Unreleased	June 25, 2010	March 9, 2012	March 9, 2012
Calvin Tucker's Redneck Jamboree	Humagade	Zoo Games	2008-12-19^{NA}	Unreleased	December 19, 2008	Unreleased	March 27, 2009
Canada Hunt	Rhino Group	Virtual Play Games	2010-05-18^{NA}	Unreleased	May 18, 2010	Unreleased	Unreleased
Candace Kane's Candy Factory	Destineer	Destineer	2008-11-13^{NA}	Unreleased	November 13, 2008	Unreleased	Unreleased
Captain America: Super Soldier	High Voltage Software	Sega	2011-07-14^{AUS}	Unreleased	July 19, 2011	July 14, 2011	July 15, 2011
Captain Morgane and the Golden Turtle	Wizarbox	Reef Entertainment	2012-03-16^{EU}	Unreleased	Unreleased	March 29, 2012	March 16, 2012
Captain Rainbow	Skip Ltd.	Nintendo	2008-08-28^{JP}	August 28, 2008	Unreleased	Unreleased	Unreleased
Carnival Games	Cat Daddy Games	Global Star Software	2007-08-27^{NA}	Unreleased	August 27, 2007	October 19, 2007	October 26, 2007
Carnival Games: Mini-Golf	Cat Daddy Games	2K Play	2008-10-21^{NA}	Unreleased	October 21, 2008	October 31, 2008	October 31, 2008
Cars	Incinerator Studios	THQ	2006-11-19^{NA}	March 22, 2007	November 19, 2006	December 14, 2006	December 8, 2006
Cars 2	Avalanche Software	Disney Interactive Studios	2011-06-21^{NA}	Unreleased	June 21, 2011	June 23, 2011	July 22, 2011
Cars Mater-National Championship	Incinerator Studios	THQ	2007-11-12^{NA}	Unreleased	November 12, 2007	January 24, 2008	February 8, 2008
Cars Race-O-Rama	Incinerator Studios	THQ	2009-10-12^{NA}	Unreleased	October 12, 2009	October 29, 2009	October 30, 2009
Cars Toon: Mater's Tall Tales	Papaya Studio	Disney Interactive Studios	2010-10-19^{NA}	Unreleased	October 19, 2010	November 18, 2010	November 5, 2010
Cartoon Network: Punch Time Explosion XL	Papaya Studio	Crave Games^{NA} OG International^{PAL}	2011-11-15^{NA}	Unreleased	November 15, 2011	May 17, 2012	May 18, 2012
Case Closed: The Mirapolis Investigation	Imageepoch	Marvelous Interactive^{JP} Nobilis^{EU}	2007-05-17^{JP}	May 17, 2007	Unreleased	Unreleased	May 1, 2009
Casper's Scare School: Spooky Sports Day	The Code Monkeys	Blast! Entertainment^{PAL} Red Wagon Games^{NA}	2009-07-31^{EU}	Unreleased	October 11, 2010	September 15, 2009	July 31, 2009
Castle of Shikigami III	Alfa System; Skonec Entertainment	Arc System Works^{JP} Aksys Games^{NA}	2007-12-13^{JP}	December 13, 2007	May 13, 2008	Unreleased	Unreleased
Castlevania Judgment	Eighting	Konami	2008-11-18^{NA}	January 15, 2009	November 18, 2008	April 2, 2009	March 20, 2009
Cate West: The Vanishing Files	Gamenauts	Destineer^{NA} Oxygen Games^{EU}	2009-03-23^{NA}	Unreleased	March 23, 2009	Unreleased	October 9, 2009
Celebrity Sports Showdown	EA Canada	EA Sports Freestyle	2008-10-20^{NA}	Unreleased	October 20, 2008	October 23, 2008	October 24, 2008
Centipede: Infestation	WayForward Technologies	Atari Interactive	2011-10-25^{NA}	Unreleased	October 25, 2011	Unreleased	Unreleased
Challenge Me: Brain Puzzles 2	Slam Productions	OG International	2010-10-08^{EU}	Unreleased	Unreleased	Unreleased	October 8, 2010
Challenge Me: Word Puzzles	Slam Productions	OG International	2011-03-25^{EU}	Unreleased	Unreleased	Unreleased	March 25, 2011
Champion Jockey: G1 Jockey & Gallop Racer	Koei	Tecmo Koei	2011-09-02^{EU}	September 22, 2011	November 8, 2011	September 22, 2011	September 2, 2011
Championship Foosball; Table Football^{EU}	DEL	505 Games	2008-08-15^{EU}	Unreleased	November 25, 2008	Unreleased	August 15, 2008
Chaos à La Maison	Lexis Numérique	Midway	2009-03-20^{EU}	Unreleased	Unreleased	Unreleased	March 20, 2009
Chaotic: Shadow Warriors	Fun Labs	Activision	2009-11-10^{NA}	Unreleased	November 10, 2009	Unreleased	Unreleased
Charm Girls Club: Pajama Party; Charm Girls Club: Pyjama Party^{AUS}	Pipeworks Software	Electronic Arts	2009-10-15^{AUS}	Unreleased	October 20, 2009	October 15, 2009	Unreleased
Cheggers Party Quiz	Oxygen Games	Oxygen Games	2007-12-07^{EU}	Unreleased	Unreleased	Unreleased	December 7, 2007
Chevrolet Camaro: Wild Ride	Visual Impact	Storm City Games^{NA} Enjoy Gaming^{PAL}	2010-10-30^{AUS/NA}	Unreleased	October 30, 2010	2011	October 30, 2010
New Play Control! Chibi-Robo!	Skip Ltd.	Nintendo	2009-06-11^{JP}	June 11, 2009	Unreleased	Unreleased	Unreleased
Chicken Blaster	Frontline Studios	Zoo Games^{NA} Funbox Media^{PAL}	2009-09-15^{NA}	Unreleased	September 15, 2009	November 21, 2010	February 5, 2010
Chicken Little: Ace in Action	Avalanche Software	Buena Vista Games	2006-12-19^{NA}	Unreleased	December 19, 2006	September 20, 2007	February 23, 2007
Chicken Riot	City Interactive	City Interactive	2009-09-30^{EU}	Unreleased	February 17, 2010	October 2009	September 30, 2009
Chicken Shoot	Frontline Studios	DSI Games^{NA} Zoo Digital Publishing^{PAL}	2007-07-05^{NA}	Unreleased	July 5, 2007	September 27, 2007	August 24, 2007
The Chronicles of Narnia: Prince Caspian	Traveller's Tales	Disney Interactive Studios	2008-05-23^{NA}	June 19, 2008	May 23, 2008	July 10, 2008	June 20, 2008
Chrysler Classic Racing	Extra Mile Studios	Zoo Games	2008-11-18^{NA}	Unreleased	November 18, 2008	January 9, 2009	January 9, 2009
Chuck E. Cheese's Party Games	UFO Interactive Games	UFO Interactive Games	2010-07-27^{NA}	Unreleased	July 27, 2010	Unreleased	Unreleased
Chuck E. Cheese's Sports Games	UFO Interactive Games	UFO Interactive Games	2011-03-03^{NA}	Unreleased	March 3, 2011	Unreleased	Unreleased
CID The Dummy	Twelve Games	Oxygen Games	2009-04-17^{EU}	Unreleased	July 7, 2009	Unreleased	April 17, 2009
Circus	Artematica	505 Games	2010-05-07^{EU}	Unreleased	Unreleased	2010	May 7, 2010
City Builder	Collision Studios	Virtual Play Games	2010-06-08^{NA}	Unreleased	June 8, 2010	Unreleased	Unreleased
Classic British Motor Racing	Data Design Interactive	Bold Games^{NA} Data Design Interactive^{PAL}	2008-01-02^{NA}	Unreleased	January 2, 2008	May 15, 2008	March 14, 2008
Clever Kids: Creepy Crawlies	Gamerholix	Midas Interactive Entertainment	2009-10-02^{EU}	Unreleased	Unreleased	Unreleased	October 2, 2009
Cloudy with a Chance of Meatballs	Ubisoft Shanghai	Ubisoft	2009-11-09^{EU}	Unreleased	September 15, 2009	November 19, 2009	September 11, 2009
Club Penguin: Game Day!	Artoon	Disney Interactive Studios	2010-09-16^{AUS}	Unreleased	September 21, 2010	September 16, 2010	September 24, 2010
Cocoto Festival	Neko Entertainment	Neko Entertainment	2009-11-20^{EU}	Unreleased	Unreleased	Unreleased	November 20, 2009
Cocoto Kart Racer	Neko Entertainment	Conspiracy Entertainment	2008-06-24^{NA}	Unreleased	June 24, 2008	Unreleased	Unreleased
Cocoto Kart Racer 2	Neko Entertainment	Neko Entertainment	2011-11-30^{EU}	Unreleased	Unreleased	Unreleased	November 30, 2011
Cocoto Magic Circus	Neko Entertainment	Conspiracy Entertainment^{NA} Neko Entertainment^{PAL}	2008-03-12^{NA}	Unreleased	March 12, 2008	March 13, 2008	March 13, 2008
Cocoto Surprise	Neko Entertainment	Neko Entertainment	2009-10-30^{EU}	Unreleased	Unreleased	Unreleased	October 30, 2009
Code de la Route	Sanuk Games	Bigben Interactive	2008-09-12^{EU}	Unreleased	Unreleased	Unreleased	September 12, 2008
Code Lyoko: Quest for Infinity	Neko Entertainment	The Game Factory	2007-11-20^{NA}	Unreleased	November 20, 2007	November 22, 2007	November 23, 2007
Cold Stone Creamery: Scoop It Up	CyberPlanet Interactive	Zoo Games	2009-11-23^{NA}	Unreleased	November 23, 2009	Unreleased	Unreleased
Colin McRae: Dirt 2	Sumo Digital	Codemasters	2009-09-08^{NA}	Unreleased	September 8, 2009	September 17, 2009	September 11, 2009
The Conduit	High Voltage Software	Sega	2009-06-23^{NA}	Unreleased	June 23, 2009	July 16, 2009	July 10, 2009
Conduit 2	High Voltage Software	Sega	2011-04-19^{NA}	Unreleased	April 19, 2011	April 21, 2011	April 21, 2011
Cooking Mama: Cook Off	Office Create	Taito^{JP} Majesco^{NA} 505 Games^{PAL}	2007-02-08^{JP}	February 8, 2007	March 20, 2007	May 18, 2007	May 11, 2007
Cooking Mama: World Kitchen	Cooking Mama Limited	Majesco^{NA} Taito^{JP} 505 Games^{PAL}	2008-11-18^{NA}	December 11, 2008	November 18, 2008	June 4, 2009	February 6, 2009
Cook Wars; Cooking Party^{AUS} Cook-Off Party^{EU}	Virtual Toys	Ubisoft	2009-11-24^{NA}	Unreleased	November 24, 2009	2009	2009
Coraline	Papaya Studio	D3 Publisher	2009-01-27^{NA}	Unreleased	January 27, 2009	Unreleased	May 1, 2009
Cosmic Family	Ubisoft Barcelona	Ubisoft	2007-08-30^{AUS}	Unreleased	September 18, 2007	August 30, 2007	August 31, 2007
Countdown: The Game	Sanuk Games	Mindscape	2009-11-13^{EU}	Unreleased	Unreleased	Unreleased	November 13, 2009
Counter Force	Hyper-Devbox Japan	Conspiracy Entertainment^{NA} 505 Games^{EU}	2007-10-05^{NA}	Unreleased	October 5, 2007	Unreleased	April 1, 2008
Country Dance	High Voltage Software	GameMill Entertainment^{NA} Funbox Media^{PAL}	2011-03-29^{NA}	Unreleased	March 29, 2011	August 19, 2011	August 19, 2011
Country Dance 2	High Voltage Software	GameMill Entertainment^{NA} Funbox Media^{EU}	2011-11-01^{NA}	Unreleased	November 1, 2011	Unreleased	May 25, 2012
Cranium Kabookii	Ubisoft Quebec	Ubisoft	2007-12-04^{NA}	Unreleased	December 4, 2007	December 13, 2007	December 7, 2007
Crash: Mind over Mutant	Radical Entertainment	Activision^{NA} Vivendi Games^{PAL}	2008-10-07^{NA}	Unreleased	October 7, 2008	October 30, 2008	October 31, 2008
Crash of the Titans	Radical Entertainment	Vivendi Games	2007-10-02^{NA}	Unreleased	October 2, 2007	October 25, 2007	October 12, 2007
Crayola: Colorful Journey	Funcrank	Crave Entertainment	2009-03-17^{NA}	Unreleased	March 17, 2009	Unreleased	Unreleased
Crayon Shin-chan: Saikyou Kazoku Kasukabe King Wii; Shin Chan: Las Nuevas Aventuras para Wii^{EU}	Banpresto	Banpresto^{JP} 505 Games^{EU}	2006-12-02^{JP}	December 2, 2006	Unreleased	Unreleased	April 25, 2008
Crazy Chicken Carnival	Visual Imagination Software	DTP Entertainment	2010-09-10^{EU}	Unreleased	Unreleased	Unreleased	September 10, 2010
Crazy Chicken Tales	DaHonko Entertains	DTP Entertainment^{EU} Conspiracy Entertainment^{NA}	2009-11-20^{EU}	Unreleased	January 12, 2010	Unreleased	November 20, 2009
Crazy Climber Wii	Nihon System	Nihon System	2007-12-20^{JP}	December 20, 2007	Unreleased	Unreleased	Unreleased
Crazy Machines	FAKT Software	DTP Entertainment^{EU} Mentor Interactive^{NA}	2010-08-13^{EU}	Unreleased	June 14, 2011	Unreleased	August 13, 2010
Crazy Quiz!: Are You Crazy Enough?	Radon Labs	RTL Enterprises	2010-05-20^{EU}	Unreleased	Unreleased	Unreleased	May 20, 2010
Create	EA Bright Light	Electronic Arts	2010-11-16^{NA}	Unreleased	November 16, 2010	November 19, 2010	November 19, 2010
The Croods: Prehistoric Party!	Torus Games	D3 Publisher^{NA} Namco Bandai Games^{EU}	2013-03-19^{NA}	Unreleased	March 19, 2013	Unreleased	March 29, 2013
Cruis'n	Just Games Interactive	Midway	2007-11-27^{NA}	Unreleased	November 27, 2007	February 14, 2008	February 15, 2008
Cruise Ship Vacation Games; Cruise Ship Resort^{EU}	Frozen Codebase	Activision^{NA} Avanquest Software^{EU}	2009-09-03^{NA}	Unreleased	September 3, 2009	Unreleased	September 17, 2010
CSI: Deadly Intent	Telltale Games	Ubisoft	2009-10-27^{NA}	Unreleased	October 27, 2009	November 12, 2009	November 13, 2009
CSI: Fatal Conspiracy	Telltale Games	Ubisoft	2010-10-26^{NA}	Unreleased	October 26, 2010	November 25, 2010	November 26, 2010
CSI: Hard Evidence	Telltale Games	Ubisoft	2008-01-17^{NA}	Unreleased	January 17, 2008	March 20, 2008	March 20, 2008
The Cube	Funbox Media	Funbox Media	2012-11-16^{EU}	Unreleased	Unreleased	Unreleased	November 16, 2012
Cursed Mountain	Sproing Interactive; Deep Silver Vienna	Deep Silver	2009-08-25^{NA}	Unreleased	August 25, 2009	October 15, 2009	September 4, 2009
Cyberbike	EKO Software	Neko Entertainment^{EU} Bigben Interactive^{AUS/NA}	2010-01-12^{NA}	Unreleased	June 28, 2011	May 5, 2011	January 12, 2010
Daikaijuu Battle: Ultra Coliseum	Namco Bandai Games	Namco Bandai Games	2008-10-16^{JP}	October 16, 2008	Unreleased	Unreleased	Unreleased
Daikaijuu Battle Ultra Coliseum DX: Ultra Senshi Daishuketsu	Namco Bandai Games	Namco Bandai Games	2010-02-25^{JP}	February 25, 2010	Unreleased	Unreleased	Unreleased
Daisy Fuentes Pilates	Collision Studios	Sega^{NA} 505 Games^{EU}	2009-08-04^{NA}	Unreleased	August 4, 2009	Unreleased	June 25, 2010
Dance Dance Revolution; Dance Dance Revolution Hottest Party 4^{EU}	Konami	Konami	2010-11-16^{NA}	Unreleased	November 16, 2010	Unreleased	May 6, 2011
Dance Dance Revolution II; Dance Dance Revolution Hottest Party 5^{EU}	Konami	Konami	2011-10-11^{NA}	Unreleased	October 11, 2011	Unreleased	November 25, 2011
Dance Dance Revolution: Disney Grooves	Konami	Konami	2009-04-02^{NA}	Unreleased	April 2, 2009	Unreleased	Unreleased
Dance Dance Revolution Hottest Party; Dancing Stage Hottest Party^{PAL}	Konami	Konami	2007-09-25^{NA}	October 25, 2007	September 25, 2007	April 17, 2008	March 28, 2008
Dance Dance Revolution Hottest Party 2	Konami	Konami	2008-09-16^{NA}	December 18, 2008	September 16, 2008	July 2, 2009	June 26, 2009
Dance Dance Revolution Hottest Party 3	Konami	Konami	2009-10-27^{NA}	January 28, 2010	October 27, 2009	Unreleased	June 4, 2010
Dance Dance Revolution Winx Club	Konami	Konami	2009-03-26^{EU}	Unreleased	Unreleased	Unreleased	March 26, 2009
Dance on Broadway	Longtail Studios; AiLive	Ubisoft	2010-06-15^{NA}	Unreleased	June 15, 2010	June 24, 2010	July 2, 2010
Dance Party Club Hits	Broadsword Interactive	Nordic Games	2009-05-08^{EU}	Unreleased	Unreleased	March 1, 2010	May 8, 2009
Dance Party Pop Hits	Broadsword Interactive	Nordic Games	2009-05-08^{EU}	Unreleased	Unreleased	March 1, 2010	May 8, 2009
Dance Sensation!	Alpine Studios	Majesco	2010-05-14^{NA}	Unreleased	May 14, 2010	Unreleased	Unreleased
Dance! It's Your Stage	Sproing Interactive	DTP Entertainment	2011-09-30^{EU}	Unreleased	Unreleased	Unreleased	September 30, 2011
Dancing on Ice	Infusion Games	Ghostlight	2010-03-12^{PAL}	Unreleased	Unreleased	March 12, 2010	March 12, 2010
Dancing with the Stars	Zoë Mode	Activision	2007-10-23^{NA}	Unreleased	October 23, 2007	Unreleased	Unreleased
Dancing with the Stars: We Dance!	Zoë Mode	Activision	2008-10-21^{NA}	Unreleased	October 21, 2008	Unreleased	Unreleased
The Daring Game for Girls	WXP	Majesco	2010-03-09^{NA}	Unreleased	March 9, 2010	Unreleased	Unreleased
Darts Wii DX	Alpha-Unit	Alpha-Unit	2009-03-19^{JP}	March 19, 2009	Unreleased	Unreleased	Unreleased
Data East Arcade Classics	G1M2	Majesco	2010-02-19^{NA}	Unreleased	February 19, 2010	Unreleased	Unreleased
Dave Mirra BMX Challenge	Left Field Productions	Crave Games^{NA} 505 Games^{PAL}	2007-10-02^{NA}	Unreleased	October 2, 2007	October 18, 2007	October 19, 2007
De Blob	Blue Tongue Entertainment	THQ	2008-09-22^{NA}	November 13, 2008	September 22, 2008	September 25, 2008	September 26, 2008
De Blob 2	Blue Tongue Entertainment	THQ	2011-02-22^{NA}	Unreleased	February 22, 2011	February 24, 2011	February 25, 2011
De Ontdekker en het Mysterie van de Diamanten Scarabee	Mad Multimedia	Royal Visio	2012-01-24^{EU}	Unreleased	Unreleased	Unreleased	January 24, 2012
Dead Rising: Chop Till You Drop	Tose	Capcom	2009-02-19^{JP}	February 19, 2009	February 24, 2009	February 26, 2009	February 27, 2009
Dead Space: Extraction	EA Redwood Shores; Eurocom	Electronic Arts	2009-09-24^{AUS}	October 1, 2009	September 29, 2009	September 24, 2009	September 25, 2009
Deadliest Catch: Sea of Chaos	DoubleTap Games	Crave Entertainment	2010-11-29^{NA}	Unreleased	November 29, 2010	Unreleased	Unreleased
Deadly Creatures	Rainbow Studios	THQ	2009-02-09^{NA}	Unreleased	February 9, 2009	February 12, 2009	February 13, 2009
Deal or No Deal: The Banker is Back	Mad Monkey Studio	Mindscape	2008-11-28^{EU}	Unreleased	Unreleased	Unreleased	November 28, 2008
Deal or No Deal	Black Lantern Studios	Zoo Games	2009-01-20^{NA}	Unreleased	January 20, 2009	Unreleased	Unreleased
Deal or No Deal: Special Edition	Mad Monkey Studio	Zoo Games	2010-09-13^{NA}	Unreleased	September 13, 2010	Unreleased	Unreleased
Death Jr. II: Root of Evil	Backbone Entertainment	Eidos Interactive	2008-05-27^{NA}	Unreleased	May 27, 2008	Unreleased	May 30, 2008
Deca Sports; Sports Island^{PAL}	Hudson Soft	Hudson Soft	2008-03-19^{JP}	March 19, 2008	May 13, 2008	August 19, 2008	June 6, 2008
Deca Sports 2 Sports Island 2^{PAL}	Hudson Soft	Hudson Soft	2009-04-16^{JP}	April 16, 2009	September 29, 2009	June 4, 2009	May 15, 2009
Deca Sports 3 Sports Island 3^{PAL}	Hudson Soft	Hudson Soft	2010-09-16^{JP}	September 16, 2010	October 26, 2010	October 28, 2010	October 15, 2010
Deepak Chopra's Leela	Curious Pictures	THQ	2011-11-08^{NA}	Unreleased	November 8, 2011	November 10, 2011	November 11, 2011
Deer Drive	Kouyousha	Mastiff	2009-01-20^{NA}	Unreleased	January 20, 2009	Unreleased	Unreleased
Deer Drive Legends	Raylight s.r.l.	Maximum Games	2012-11-16^{NA}	Unreleased	November 16, 2012	Unreleased	Unreleased
Def Jam Rapstar	4mm Games; Terminal Reality	Konami	2010-10-05^{NA}	Unreleased	October 5, 2010	Unreleased	November 26, 2010
Defendin' De Penguin	Brain Toys; PhoenixSoft Games	Crave Entertainment^{NA} Zushi Games^{EU} Funbox Media^{AUS}	2008-09-02^{NA}	Unreleased	September 2, 2008	January 20, 2011	March 5, 2010
Densha de Go! Shinkansen EX Sanyō Shinkansen-hen	Taito	Taito	2007-03-01^{JP}	March 1, 2007	Unreleased	Unreleased	Unreleased
Der Bauernhof	Visual Imagination Software	Astragon	2010-06-10^{EU}	Unreleased	Unreleased	Unreleased	June 10, 2010
Der Fluch der Osterinsel	Independent Arts Software	SevenOne Intermedia	2010-11-11^{EU}	Unreleased	Unreleased	Unreleased	November 11, 2010
Der Gesundheitscoach - Wohlfühlen jeden Tag!	Independent Arts Software	SevenOne Intermedia	2010-03-25^{EU}	Unreleased	Unreleased	Unreleased	March 25, 2010
Despicable Me: The Game	Monkey Bar Games	D3 Publisher	2010-07-06^{NA}	Unreleased	July 6, 2010	September 2, 2010	October 1, 2010
The Destiny of Zorro	Pronto Games	505 Games	2008-02-15^{EU}	Unreleased	May 5, 2009	Unreleased	February 15, 2008
Destroy All Humans! Big Willy Unleashed	Locomotive Games	THQ	2008-02-25^{NA}	Unreleased	February 25, 2008	March 6, 2008	March 7, 2008
Dewy's Adventure	Konami	Konami	2007-07-26^{JP}	July 26, 2007	September 25, 2007	December 13, 2007	November 23, 2007
Diabolik: The Original Sin	Artematica	Black Bean Games	2009-06-26^{EU}	Unreleased	Unreleased	Unreleased	June 26, 2009
Die drei Fragezeichen: Das verfluchte Schloss	Exozet Games	USM	2009-04-30^{EU}	Unreleased	Unreleased	Unreleased	April 30, 2009
Die Montagsmaler und andere Malspiele	Tivola	Tivola	2010-10-21^{EU}	Unreleased	Unreleased	Unreleased	October 21, 2010
Dino Strike	N-Fusion Interactive Entertainment	Zoo Games^{NA} Funbox Media^{PAL}	2011-02-01^{NA}	Unreleased	February 1, 2011	November 24, 2011	November 25, 2011
Disaster: Day of Crisis	Monolith Soft	Nintendo	2008-09-25^{JP}	September 25, 2008	Unreleased	November 13, 2008	October 24, 2008
Disney Channel All Star Party	Page 44 Studios	Disney Interactive Studios	2010-10-26^{NA}	Unreleased	October 26, 2010	November 18, 2010	November 5, 2010
Disney Infinity	Heavy Iron Studios	Disney Interactive Studios	2013-08-18^{NA}	Unreleased	August 18, 2013	August 22, 2013	August 23, 2013
Disney Princess: Enchanted Journey	Papaya Studio	Disney Interactive Studios	2007-10-16^{EU}	December 6, 2007	October 30, 2007	March 13, 2008	October 16, 2007
Disney Princess: Enchanting Storybooks	Page 44 Studios	THQ	2011-11-01^{NA}	Unreleased	November 1, 2011	November 17, 2011	November 18, 2011
Disney Princess: My Fairytale Adventure	High Impact Games	Disney Interactive Studios	2012-08-17^{EU}	Unreleased	September 25, 2012	November 1, 2012	August 17, 2012
Disney Sing It	Zoë Mode	Disney Interactive Studios	2008-10-21^{NA}	Unreleased	October 21, 2008	December 4, 2008	November 21, 2008
Disney Sing It: Family Hits	Zoë Mode	Disney Interactive Studios	2010-08-03^{NA}	Unreleased	August 3, 2010	October 7, 2010	October 8, 2010
Disney Sing It! – High School Musical 3: Senior Year	Zoë Mode	Disney Interactive Studios	2008-12-05^{EU}	Unreleased	February 17, 2009	December 18, 2008	December 5, 2008
Disney Sing It: Party Hits	Zoë Mode	Disney Interactive Studios	2010-09-24^{EU}	Unreleased	October 12, 2010	October 7, 2010	September 24, 2010
Disney Sing It: Pop Hits	Zoë Mode	Disney Interactive Studios	2009-10-06^{NA}	Unreleased	October 6, 2009	October 21, 2009	October 9, 2009
Disney Think Fast	Magenta Software	Disney Interactive Studios	2008-10-21^{NA}	December 18, 2008	October 21, 2008	December 4, 2008	December 5, 2008
Disney Universe	Eurocom	Disney Interactive Studios	2011-10-25^{NA}	Unreleased	October 25, 2011	October 27, 2011	October 28, 2011
Diva Girls: Princess on Ice; Diva Girls: Divas on Ice^{NA}	Arc System Works	505 Games	2009-04-09^{EU}	Unreleased	June 16, 2009	June 11, 2009	April 9, 2009
DJ Hero	Exient Entertainment	Activision	2009-10-27^{NA}	Unreleased	October 27, 2009	October 28, 2009	October 29, 2009
DJ Hero 2	FreeStyleGames	Activision	2010-10-19^{AUS/NA}	Unreleased	October 19, 2010	October 19, 2010	October 22, 2010
Doala de Wii	Tera Box	Tera Box	2009-04-02^{JP}	April 2, 2009	Unreleased	Unreleased	Unreleased
Doctor Fizzwizzle's Animal Rescue	Steel Penny Games	Conspiracy Entertainment	2009-10-21^{NA}	Unreleased	October 21, 2009	Unreleased	Unreleased
Doctor Who: Return to Earth	Asylum Entertainment	Asylum Entertainment	2010-11-19^{EU}	Unreleased	Unreleased	November 25, 2010	November 19, 2010
Dodge Racing: Charger vs. Challenger	Extra Mile Studios	Zoo Games^{NA} Funbox Media^{PAL}	2009-09-24^{NA}	Unreleased	September 24, 2009	December 16, 2010	December 10, 2010
The Dog Island	Yuke's	Yuke's^{JP} Ubisoft^{WW}	2007-04-26^{JP}	April 26, 2007	May 6, 2008	March 13, 2008	April 11, 2008
Dokapon Kingdom	Sting Entertainment	Sting Entertainment^{JP} Atlus^{NA} Bigben Interactive^{EU}	2008-07-31^{JP}	July 31, 2008	October 14, 2008	Unreleased	March 26, 2010
Don King Boxing	2K Shanghai	2K Sports	2009-03-27^{PAL}	Unreleased	March 31, 2009	March 27, 2009	March 27, 2009
Donkey Kong Barrel Blast; Donkey Kong Jet Race^{PAL}	Paon	Nintendo	2007-06-28^{JP}	June 28, 2007	October 8, 2007	February 7, 2008	January 25, 2008
Donkey Kong Country Returns	Retro Studios	Nintendo	2010-11-21^{NA}	December 9, 2010	November 21, 2010	December 2, 2010	December 3, 2010
New Play Control! Donkey Kong Jungle Beat	Nintendo EAD Tokyo	Nintendo	2008-12-11^{JP}	December 11, 2008	May 4, 2009	June 18, 2009	June 5, 2009
Dood's Big Adventure	THQ Digital Studios Phoenix	THQ	2010-11-14^{NA}	Unreleased	November 14, 2010	February 24, 2011	March 4, 2011
Dora's Big Birthday Adventure	High Voltage Software	2K Play	2010-10-26^{NA}	Unreleased	October 26, 2010	November 19, 2010	November 19, 2010
Dora the Explorer: Dora Saves the Crystal Kingdom	High Voltage Software	2K Play	2009-11-03^{NA}	Unreleased	November 3, 2009	July 1, 2010	November 27, 2009
Dora the Explorer: Dora Saves the Snow Princess	High Voltage Software	2K Play	2008-10-27^{NA}	Unreleased	October 27, 2008	July 2, 2009	December 5, 2008
Doraemon Wii: Himitsu Douguou Ketteisen	Eighting	Sega	2007-12-06^{JP}	December 6, 2007	Unreleased	Unreleased	Unreleased
Dragon Ball: Revenge of King Piccolo	Media.Vision	Namco Bandai Games	2009-07-23^{JP}	July 23, 2009	October 20, 2009	October 15, 2009	October 30, 2009
Dragon Ball Z: Budokai Tenkaichi 2	Spike	Atari^{NA/AUS} Namco Bandai Games^{JP/EU}	2006-11-19^{NA}	January 1, 2007	November 19, 2006	April 5, 2007	March 30, 2007
Dragon Ball Z: Budokai Tenkaichi 3	Spike	Namco Bandai Games^{JP/EU} Atari^{NA/AUS}	2007-10-04^{JP}	October 4, 2007	December 3, 2007	February 15, 2008	February 15, 2008
Dragon Blade: Wrath of Fire	Land Ho!	D3 Publisher	2007-09-25^{NA}	November 22, 2007	September 25, 2007	November 2, 2007	November 16, 2007
Dragon Quest 25th Anniversary Commemoration: Famicom & Super Famicom Dragon Quest I·II·III	Intelligent Systems	Square Enix	2011-09-15^{JP}	September 15, 2011	Unreleased	Unreleased	Unreleased
Dragon Quest: Monster Battle Road Victory	Eighting	Square Enix	2010-07-15^{JP}	July 15, 2010	Unreleased	Unreleased	Unreleased
Dragon Quest Swords: The Masked Queen and the Tower of Mirrors	Genius Sonority; Eighting	Square Enix	2007-07-12^{JP}	July 12, 2007	February 19, 2008	May 8, 2008	May 9, 2008
Dragon Quest X: Inishie no Ryuu no Denshou Online	Square Enix	Square Enix	2015-04-30^{JP}	April 30, 2015	Unreleased	Unreleased	Unreleased
Dragon Quest X: Mezameshi Itsutsu no Shuzoku Online	Square Enix	Square Enix	2012-08-02^{JP}	August 2, 2012	Unreleased	Unreleased	Unreleased
Dragon Quest X: Nemureru Yūsha to Michibiki no Meiyū Online	Square Enix	Square Enix	2013-12-05^{JP}	December 5, 2013	Unreleased	Unreleased	Unreleased
Dragon's Lair Trilogy	Digital Leisure	Destineer	2010-10-19^{NA}	Unreleased	October 19, 2010	Unreleased	Unreleased
Drawn to Life: The Next Chapter	Planet Moon Studios	THQ	2009-10-08^{AUS}	Unreleased	October 27, 2009	October 8, 2009	October 16, 2009
Drawsome! Artist & Drawsome! Sketch Quest	Ubisoft; Eko Software	Ubisoft	2011-12-06^{NA}	Unreleased	December 6, 2011	Unreleased	Unreleased
Dream Dance & Cheer	CyberPlanet Interactive	Zoo Games	2009-10-13^{NA}	Unreleased	October 13, 2009	Unreleased	Unreleased
Dream Pinball 3D	TopWare Interactive	SouthPeak Games	2008-04-22^{NA}	Unreleased	April 22, 2008	May 22, 2008	May 16, 2008
Dream Salon	CyberPlanet Interactive	Zoo Games	2009-11-03^{NA}	Unreleased	November 3, 2009	Unreleased	Unreleased
DreamWorks Super Star Kartz	High Impact Games	Activision	2011-11-15^{NA}	Unreleased	November 15, 2011	Unreleased	November 18, 2011
Driver: Parallel Lines	Reflections Interactive	Ubisoft	2007-06-26^{NA}	Unreleased	June 26, 2007	June 28, 2007	June 29, 2007
Driver: San Francisco	Ubisoft Porto Alegre	Ubisoft	2011-08-30^{NA}	Unreleased	August 30, 2011	September 1, 2011	September 2, 2011
EA Playground	EA Canada	Electronic Arts	2007-10-23^{NA}	March 6, 2008	October 23, 2007	November 8, 2007	November 2, 2007
EA Sports Active	EA Canada	EA Sports	2009-05-19^{NA}	August 6, 2009	May 19, 2009	May 21, 2009	May 22, 2009
EA Sports Active 2	EA Canada	EA Sports	2010-11-16^{NA}	Unreleased	November 16, 2010	November 18, 2010	November 19, 2010
EA Sports Active: More Workouts	EA Canada	EA Sports	2009-11-17^{NA}	April 1, 2010	November 17, 2009	November 19, 2009	November 20, 2009
EA Sports Active NFL Training Camp	EA Canada	EA Sports	2010-11-16^{NA}	Unreleased	November 16, 2010	Unreleased	Unreleased
Earth Seeker	Crafts & Meister; Kadokawa Shoten	Enterbrain	2011-06-23^{JP}	June 23, 2011	Unreleased	Unreleased	Unreleased
El Chavo	Kaxan Media Group	Slang Publishing; Televisa	2012-04-27^{NA}	Unreleased	April 27, 2012	Unreleased	Unreleased
Elebits; Eledees^{PAL}	Konami	Konami	2006-12-02^{JP}	December 2, 2006	December 12, 2006	May 17, 2007	May 4, 2007
Ellen Whitaker's Horse Life	Neko Entertainment	Deep Silver	2008-12-12^{EU}	Unreleased	Unreleased	Unreleased	December 12, 2008
Emergency Heroes	Ubisoft Reflections; Ubisoft Barcelona	Ubisoft	2008-05-27^{NA}	Unreleased	May 27, 2008	June 12, 2008	June 13, 2008
Emergency Mayhem	Supersonic Software	Codemasters	2008-04-15^{NA}	Unreleased	April 15, 2008	May 8, 2008	June 13, 2008
Enclave: Shadows of Twilight	Doyodo Entertainment	TopWare Interactive	2012-05-22^{EU}	Unreleased	Unreleased	Unreleased	May 22, 2012
Endless Ocean	Arika	Nintendo	2007-08-02^{JP}	August 2, 2007	January 21, 2008	January 17, 2008	November 9, 2007
Endless Ocean: Blue World; Endless Ocean 2: Adventures of the Deep^{PAL}	Arika	Nintendo	2009-09-17^{JP}	September 17, 2009	February 22, 2010	February 25, 2010	February 5, 2010
Ennichi no Tatsujin	Namco Bandai Games	Namco Bandai Games	2006-12-02^{JP}	December 2, 2006	Unreleased	Unreleased	Unreleased
Epic Mickey	Junction Point Studios	Disney Interactive Studios^{WW} Nintendo^{JP}	2010-11-25^{AU}	August 4, 2011	November 30, 2010	November 25, 2010	November 26, 2010
Epic Mickey 2: The Power of Two	Junction Point Studios	Disney Interactive Studios^{WW} Spike Chunsoft^{JP}	2012-11-18^{NA}	September 26, 2013	November 18, 2012	November 22, 2012	November 23, 2012
Escape from Bug Island	Spike	Spike^{JP} Eidos Interactive^{WW}	2006-12-02^{JP}	December 2, 2006	July 25, 2007	November 1, 2007	October 26, 2007
Escape the Museum	Void Productions	Majesco	2009-04-14^{NA}	Unreleased	April 14, 2009	September 28, 2009	August 28, 2009
Everyone Sing	Gusto Games	Oxygen Games	2012-09-14^{EU}	Unreleased	Unreleased	Unreleased	September 14, 2012
Excitebots: Trick Racing	Monster Games	Nintendo	2009-04-20^{NA}	August 30, 2011	April 20, 2009	Unreleased	Unreleased
Excite Truck	Monster Games	Nintendo	2006-11-19^{NA}	January 18, 2007	November 19, 2006	February 22, 2007	February 16, 2007
ExerBeat	Namco Bandai Games	Namco Bandai Games	2011-05-12^{AUS}	Unreleased	May 17, 2011	May 12, 2011	May 27, 2011
Eyeshield 21: Field Saikyō no Senshi Tachi	Eighting	Nintendo	2007-03-08^{JP}	March 8, 2007	Unreleased	Unreleased	Unreleased
F1 2009	Sumo Digital	Codemasters	2009-11-16^{NA}	December 17, 2009	November 16, 2009	November 19, 2009	November 19, 2009
FaceBreaker K.O. Party	EA Canada	EA Sports Freestyle	2008-11-11^{NA}	December 11, 2008	November 11, 2008	November 13, 2008	November 14, 2008
Family Fest Presents Circus Games; Fun Fair Party^{PAL}	Kuju America	Ubisoft	2008-10-21^{NA}	Unreleased	October 21, 2008	November 20, 2008	November 21, 2008
Family Fest Presents Movie Games; Movie Studios Party^{PAL}	Phoenix Interactive	Ubisoft	2008-11-04^{NA}	Unreleased	November 4, 2008	November 20, 2008	November 21, 2008
Family Feud 2010 Edition	Ludia	Ubisoft	2009-09-29^{NA}	Unreleased	September 29, 2009	Unreleased	Unreleased
Family Feud 2012 Edition	Ludia	Ubisoft	2011-10-17^{NA}	Unreleased	October 17, 2011	Unreleased	Unreleased
Family Feud Decades	Ludia	Ubisoft	2010-11-09^{NA}	Unreleased	November 9, 2010	Unreleased	Unreleased
Family Fortunes	Slam Productions	Mindscape	2009-10-23^{EU}	Unreleased	Unreleased	Unreleased	October 23, 2009
Family Fun Football	Seamless Entertainment	Tecmo	2009-09-29^{NA}	Unreleased	September 29, 2009	Unreleased	Unreleased
Family Gameshow	puzzle.tv	Zushi Games^{EU} Funbox Media^{AUS} Storm City Games^{NA}	2009-11-20^{EU}	Unreleased	May 4, 2010	November 29, 2009	November 20, 2009
Family Jockey	Namco Bandai Games	Namco Bandai Games	2008-03-06^{JP}	March 6, 2008	Unreleased	Unreleased	Unreleased
Family Party: 30 Great Games; Simple 2000 Series Wii Vol. 2: The Party Game^{JP}	Tamsoft	D3 Publisher	2008-08-28^{JP}	August 28, 2008	December 2, 2008	December 12, 2008	December 12, 2008
Family Party: 30 Great Games Outdoor Fun	Tamsoft	D3 Publisher	2009-09-22^{NA}	Unreleased	September 22, 2009	October 9, 2009	October 9, 2009
Family Party: 30 Great Games Winter Fun; Family Party: Winter Fun^{EU}	Tamsoft	D3 Publisher	2010-02-09^{NA}	Unreleased	February 9, 2010	Unreleased	February 19, 2010
Family Party: Fitness Fun	Tamsoft	D3 Publisher^{NA/EU} Namco Bandai Games^{JP}	2010-09-21^{NA}	December 9, 2010	September 21, 2010	Unreleased	October 22, 2010
Fantastic Football Fan Party	Zeroscale	DTP Entertainment	2010-05-29^{EU}	Unreleased	Unreleased	Unreleased	May 29, 2010
Fantastic Four: Rise of the Silver Surfer	7 Studios	2K	2007-06-15^{AUS/NA}	Unreleased	June 15, 2007	June 15, 2007	June 29, 2007
Fantasy Aquarium World	Coresoft	Destineer	2009-05-13^{NA}	Unreleased	May 13, 2009	Unreleased	Unreleased
Far Cry Vengeance	Ubisoft Montreal	Ubisoft	2006-12-12^{NA}	Unreleased	December 12, 2006	February 28, 2007	January 5, 2007
Fast Food Panic	Dorasu	Nobilis^{PAL} Dorasu^{JP} SouthPeak Games^{NA}	2009-06-26^{EU}	December 3, 2009	January 27, 2010	July 23, 2009	June 26, 2009
Ferrari Challenge: Trofeo Pirelli	Eutechnyx	System 3	2008-08-26^{NA}	Unreleased	August 26, 2008	August 28, 2008	September 12, 2008
Ferrari: The Race Experience	Eutechnyx	System 3	2011-10-21^{EU}	Unreleased	Unreleased	2011	October 21, 2011
FIFA 08; FIFA Soccer 08^{NA}	EA Canada	EA Sports	2007-09-27^{AUS}	December 20, 2007	October 9, 2007	September 27, 2007	September 28, 2007
FIFA 09 All-Play; FIFA Soccer 09 All-Play^{NA}	EA Canada	EA Sports	2008-10-02^{AUS}	December 18, 2008	October 28, 2008	October 2, 2008	October 3, 2008
FIFA 10; FIFA Soccer 10^{NA}	EA Canada	EA Sports	2009-10-01^{AUS}	October 22, 2009	October 20, 2009	October 1, 2009	October 2, 2009
FIFA 11; FIFA Soccer 11^{NA}	EA Canada	EA Sports	2010-09-30^{AUS}	Unreleased	October 4, 2010	September 30, 2010	October 1, 2010
FIFA 12; FIFA Soccer 12^{NA}	EA Canada	EA Sports	2011-09-27^{NA}	Unreleased	September 27, 2011	September 29, 2011	September 30, 2011
FIFA 13; FIFA Soccer 13^{NA}	EA Canada	EA Sports	2012-09-25^{NA}	Unreleased	September 25, 2012	September 27, 2012	September 28, 2012
FIFA 14; FIFA Soccer 14^{NA}	EA Canada	EA Sports	2013-09-24^{NA}	Unreleased	September 24, 2013	September 26, 2013	September 27, 2013
FIFA 15; FIFA Soccer 15^{NA}	EA Canada	EA Sports	2014-09-23^{NA}	Unreleased	September 23, 2014	September 26, 2014	September 25, 2014
Final Fantasy Crystal Chronicles: The Crystal Bearers	Square Enix	Square Enix	2009-11-12^{JP}	November 12, 2009	December 26, 2009	February 5, 2010	February 5, 2010
Final Fantasy Crystal Chronicles: Echoes of Time	Square Enix	Square Enix	2009-01-29^{JP}	January 29, 2009	March 24, 2009	April 2, 2009	March 27, 2009
Final Fantasy Fables: Chocobo's Dungeon	h.a.n.d.	Square Enix	2007-12-13^{JP}	December 13, 2007	July 8, 2008	July 30, 2008	November 7, 2008
Fire Emblem: Radiant Dawn	Intelligent Systems	Nintendo	2007-02-22^{JP}	February 22, 2007	November 5, 2007	April 10, 2008	March 14, 2008
Fishing Master	Hudson Soft	Hudson Soft	2007-03-29^{JP}	March 29, 2007	September 18, 2007	March 21, 2008	March 7, 2008
Fishing Master World Tour	Hudson Soft	Hudson Soft	2008-07-24^{JP}	July 24, 2008	January 6, 2009	Unreleased	Unreleased
Fishing Resort	Prope	Namco Bandai Games^{JP} Xseed Games^{NA}	2011-08-04^{JP}	August 4, 2011	November 22, 2011	Unreleased	Unreleased
Fit & Fun	Coreplay	Funbox Media	2011-06-24^{PAL}	Unreleased	Unreleased	June 24, 2011	June 24, 2011
Fit in Six; My Fitness Coach Club^{PAL}	Blue Byte	Ubisoft	2011-03-15^{NA}	July 28, 2011	March 15, 2011	March 18, 2011	March 18, 2011
Fit Music	O2 Games	O2 Games	2012-09-30^{EU}	Unreleased	Unreleased	Unreleased	September 30, 2012
Fix It: Home Improvement Challenge	Freedom Factory Studios	Nobilis^{EU} SouthPeak Games^{NA}	2010-05-21^{EU}	Unreleased	November 8, 2011	Unreleased	May 21, 2010
FlatOut	Team6 Game Studios	Zoo Games^{NA} Funbox Media^{EU}	2010-11-23^{NA}	Unreleased	November 23, 2010	Unreleased	July 27, 2012
FlingSmash	Artoon	Nintendo	2010-11-07^{NA}	November 18, 2010	November 7, 2010	Unreleased	November 19, 2010
Flip's Twisted World	Frozen North Productions	Majesco	2010-10-25^{NA}	Unreleased	October 25, 2010	Unreleased	Unreleased
Food Network: Cook or Be Cooked	Red Fly Studio	Namco Bandai Games	2009-11-03^{NA}	Unreleased	November 3, 2009	Unreleased	Unreleased
Foot 2 Rue: Nicolas Anelka; Street Football 2: Obiettivo Coppa del Mondo^{ITA}	DehonGames	Deep Silver	2009-11-12^{EU}	Unreleased	Unreleased	Unreleased	November 12, 2009
Fort Boyard: Le Jeu	Mad Monkey Studio	Mindscape	2008-06-19^{EU}	Unreleased	Unreleased	Unreleased	June 19, 2008
Fortune Street; Boom Street^{PAL}	Marvelous AQL	Square Enix^{JP} Nintendo^{WW}	2011-12-01^{JP}	December 1, 2011	December 5, 2011	January 5, 2012	December 23, 2011
Fragile Dreams: Farewell Ruins of the Moon	Namco Bandai Games; tri-Crescendo	Namco Bandai Games^{JP} Xseed Games^{NA} Rising Star Games^{PAL}	2009-01-22^{JP}	January 22, 2009	March 16, 2010	April 1, 2010	March 19, 2010
Freddi Fish: Kelp Seed Mystery; Freddi Fish: The Case of the Missing Kelp Seeds^{PAL}	Mistic Software	Majesco^{NA} Atari Europe^{PAL}	2008-08-29^{NA}	Unreleased	August 29, 2008	December 5, 2008	December 5, 2008
Free Running	Rebellion Developments	Reef Entertainment^{EU} Graffiti Entertainment^{NA}	2009-10-01^{EU}	Unreleased	April 28, 2010	Unreleased	October 1, 2009
Fritz Chess	Freedom Factory Studios	Deep Silver	2009-06-30^{NA}	Unreleased	June 30, 2009	July 10, 2009	July 10, 2009
Fullmetal Alchemist: Akatsuki no Ōji	Square Enix	Square Enix	2009-08-13^{JP}	August 13, 2009	Unreleased	Unreleased	Unreleased
Fullmetal Alchemist: Tasogare no Shōjo	Square Enix	Square Enix	2009-12-10^{JP}	December 10, 2009	Unreleased	Unreleased	Unreleased
Furu Furu Park	Taito	Taito^{JP} Majesco^{NA}	2007-04-19^{JP}	April 19, 2007	January 17, 2008	Unreleased	Unreleased
G-Force	Eurocom	Disney Interactive Studios	2009-07-21^{NA}	Unreleased	July 21, 2009	September 16, 2009	July 31, 2009
G.I. Joe: The Rise of Cobra	Double Helix Games	Electronic Arts	2009-08-04^{WW}	Unreleased	August 4, 2009	August 4, 2009	August 4, 2009
G1 Jockey Wii	Koei	Koei	2007-03-15^{JP}	March 15, 2007	Unreleased	June 28, 2007	June 29, 2007
G1 Jockey Wii 2008	Koei	Koei	2008-09-18^{JP}	September 18, 2008	Unreleased	October 2, 2008	September 26, 2008
Galileo Family Quiz	Funbox Media	F+F Distribution	2010-03-12^{EU}	Unreleased	Unreleased	Unreleased	March 12, 2010
Galileo Mystery: The Crown of Midas	Independent Arts Software	SevenOne Intermedia	2009-10-08^{EU}	Unreleased	Unreleased	Unreleased	October 8, 2009
Gallop & Ride	Sproing Interactive	THQ	2008-11-17^{NA}	Unreleased	November 17, 2008	Unreleased	Unreleased
Game Party	FarSight Studios	Midway	2007-11-27^{NA}	Unreleased	November 27, 2007	February 14, 2008	February 15, 2008
Game Party 2 More Game Party^{PAL}	FarSight Studios	Midway	2008-10-06^{NA}	Unreleased	October 6, 2008	November 20, 2008	October 31, 2008
Game Party 3	FarSight Studios	Warner Bros. Interactive Entertainment	2009-10-06^{NA}	Unreleased	October 6, 2009	December 8, 2009	December 4, 2009
The Garfield Show: Threat of the Space Lasagna	Eko Software	Eko Software^{EU} Zoo Games^{NA}	2010-06-23^{EU}	Unreleased	July 8, 2010	Unreleased	June 23, 2010
GeGeGe no Kitarō: Yōkai Daiundōkai	Namco Bandai Games	Namco Bandai Games	2007-11-22^{JP}	November 22, 2007	Unreleased	Unreleased	Unreleased
Gem Smashers	Frame Studios	Red Wagon Games	2011-11-08^{NA}	Unreleased	November 8, 2011	Unreleased	Unreleased
Generator Rex: Agent of Providence	Virtuos	Activision	2011-11-01^{NA}	Unreleased	November 1, 2011	Unreleased	November 4, 2011
Geometry Wars: Galaxies	Bizarre Creations; Kuju Entertainment	Vivendi Games	2007-11-20^{NA}	Unreleased	November 20, 2007	February 7, 2008	January 18, 2008
Geon Cube	Strawdog Studios	UFO Interactive Games	2009-10-27^{NA}	Unreleased	October 27, 2009	Unreleased	Unreleased
George of the Jungle and the Search for the Secret; George of the Jungle^{PAL}	Papaya Studio	Crave Entertainment^{NA} Ignition Entertainment^{PAL}	2008-03-18^{NA}	Unreleased	March 18, 2008	March 20, 2008	March 28, 2008
Germany's Next Top Model 2009	Coreplay	SevenOne Intermedia	2009-04-07^{EU}	Unreleased	Unreleased	Unreleased	April 7, 2009
Germany's Next Top Model 2010	Rainfire Entertainment	SevenOne Intermedia	2010-02-10^{EU}	Unreleased	Unreleased	Unreleased	February 10, 2010
Germany's Next Top Model 2011	Rainfire Entertainment	SevenOne Intermedia	2011-03-18^{EU}	Unreleased	Unreleased	Unreleased	March 18, 2011
Get Fit with Mel B	Lightning Fish	Black Bean Games^{PAL} Deep Silver^{NA}	2010-10-25^{AUS}	Unreleased	September 14, 2011	October 25, 2010	November 26, 2010
Get Up and Dance	Gusto Games	O-Games	2011-11-04^{PAL}	Unreleased	November 22, 2011	November 4, 2011	November 4, 2011
Ghostbusters: The Video Game	Red Fly Studio	Atari Interactive	2009-06-16^{NA}	Unreleased	June 16, 2009	November 19, 2009	November 6, 2009
Ghost Squad	Polygon Magic	Sega	2007-10-23^{JP}	October 23, 2007	November 20, 2007	January 24, 2008	January 18, 2008
Ginsei Table Games Wii	SilverStar	Electronic Arts	2008-10-23^{JP}	October 23, 2008	Unreleased	Unreleased	Unreleased
Gintama Yorozuya Chūbu Tsukkomaburu Dōga	Natsume Co., Ltd.	Namco Bandai Games	2007-10-25^{JP}	October 25, 2007	Unreleased	Unreleased	Unreleased
Girls Life: Sleepover Party; Sleepover Party^{NA}	Zoë Mode	Ubisoft	2009-12-03^{AUS}	Unreleased	January 12, 2010	December 3, 2009	December 8, 2009
Glacier 2	Team6 Game Studios	Zoo Games	2009-10-13^{NA}	Unreleased	October 13, 2009	Unreleased	Unreleased
Glacier 3: The Meltdown	Team6 Game Studios	Zoo Games^{NA} Funbox Media^{EU}	2010-09-06^{NA}	Unreleased	September 6, 2010	Unreleased	February 24, 2012
Go, Diego, Go!: Great Dinosaur Rescue	High Voltage Software	2K Play	2008-10-27^{NA}	Unreleased	October 27, 2008	July 2, 2009	March 20, 2009
Go, Diego, Go!: Safari Rescue	High Voltage Software	2K Play	2008-02-11^{NA}	Unreleased	February 11, 2008	March 3, 2008	March 7, 2008
Go Play Circus Star	N-Fusion Interactive Entertainment	Majesco	2009-06-09^{NA}	Unreleased	June 9, 2009	Unreleased	Unreleased
Go Play City Sports	Digital Embryo	Majesco	2009-09-11^{NA}	Unreleased	September 11, 2009	Unreleased	Unreleased
Go Play Lumberjacks	Panic Button	Majesco	2009-06-09^{NA}	Unreleased	June 9, 2009	Unreleased	Unreleased
Go Vacation	Namco Bandai Games	Namco Bandai Games	2011-10-11^{NA}	October 20, 2011	October 11, 2011	November 17, 2011	November 4, 2011
Go West! A Lucky Luke Adventure	Tate Interactive	Atari Europe	2007-11-20^{EU}	Unreleased	Unreleased	Unreleased	November 20, 2007
The Godfather: Blackhand Edition	EA Redwood Shores	Electronic Arts	2007-03-20^{NA}	Unreleased	March 20, 2007	March 22, 2007	March 23, 2007
Godzilla: Unleashed	Pipeworks Software	Atari	2007-12-05^{NA}	Unreleased	December 5, 2007	February 29, 2008	February 22, 2008
Gold's Gym: Cardio Workout	Rocket Company	Rocket Company^{JP} Ubisoft^{WW}	2008-10-30^{JP}	October 30, 2008	March 31, 2009	August 27, 2009	July 17, 2009
Gold's Gym: Dance Workout; My Fitness Coach: Dance Workout^{PAL}	Rocket Company	Ubisoft^{WW} Rocket Company^{JP}	2010-08-17^{NA}	December 16, 2010	August 17, 2010	August 26, 2010	August 27, 2010
Golden Balls	Slam Productions	Mindscape	2008-12-05^{EU}	Unreleased	Unreleased	Unreleased	December 5, 2008
The Golden Compass	Shiny Entertainment	Sega	2007-11-30^{EU}	Unreleased	December 4, 2007	December 13, 2007	November 30, 2007
GoldenEye 007	Eurocom	Activision^{WW} Nintendo^{JP}	2010-11-02^{NA}	June 30, 2011	November 2, 2010	November 3, 2010	November 5, 2010
Goosebumps HorrorLand	Gusto Games	Elastic Media Corporation^{NA} Majesco^{EU}	2008-10-28^{NA}	Unreleased	October 28, 2008	Unreleased	October 16, 2009
Gormiti: The Lords of Nature!	Climax Studios	Konami	2010-08-27^{EU}	Unreleased	September 21, 2010	Unreleased	August 27, 2010
Grand Slam Tennis	EA Canada	EA Sports	2009-06-08^{NA}	July 2, 2009	June 8, 2009	June 9, 2009	June 12, 2009
Grease: The Official Video Game	Zoë Mode	505 Games	2010-08-24^{NA}	Unreleased	August 24, 2010	September 16, 2010	August 27, 2010
Green Day: Rock Band	Harmonix	MTV Games	2010-06-08^{NA}	Unreleased	June 8, 2010	June 11, 2010	June 11, 2010
Green Lantern: Rise of the Manhunters	Griptonite Games	Warner Bros. Interactive Entertainment	2011-06-07^{NA}	Unreleased	June 7, 2011	June 29, 2011	June 10, 2011
Greg Hastings Paintball 2	Super X Studios	Majesco^{NA} 505 Games^{EU}	2010-09-28^{NA}	Unreleased	September 28, 2010	Unreleased	May 6, 2011
Gremlins Gizmo	Pipeworks Software	NECA	2011-11-18^{NA}	Unreleased	November 18, 2011	Unreleased	Unreleased
Grey's Anatomy: The Video Game	Longtail Studios	Ubisoft	2009-03-10^{NA}	Unreleased	March 10, 2009	March 12, 2009	March 13, 2009
The Grim Adventures of Billy & Mandy	High Voltage Software	Midway	2006-11-19^{NA}	Unreleased	November 19, 2006	March 15, 2007	March 16, 2007
Groovin' Blocks	Empty Clip Studios	Zoo Games	2009-08-11^{NA}	Unreleased	August 11, 2009	Unreleased	Unreleased
GT Pro Series	MTO	Ubisoft^{WW} MTO^{JP}	2006-11-19^{NA}	January 11, 2007	November 19, 2006	December 7, 2006	December 8, 2006
GTI Club: Supermini Festa!	Konami	Konami	2010-02-25^{JP}	February 25, 2010	March 16, 2010	Unreleased	March 25, 2010
Guilty Gear XX Accent Core	Arc System Works	Arc System Works^{JP} Aksys Games^{NA} 505 Games^{PAL}	2007-07-26^{JP}	July 26, 2007	October 16, 2007	March 6, 2008	February 29, 2008
Guilty Gear XX Accent Core Plus	Arc System Works	Aksys Games^{NA} Zen United^{EU}	2009-05-12^{NA}	Unreleased	May 12, 2009	Unreleased	May 20, 2011
Guilty Party	Wideload Games	Disney Interactive Studios	2010-08-26^{NA}	Unreleased	August 26, 2010	Unreleased	Unreleased
Guinness World Records: The Videogame	TT Fusion	Warner Bros. Interactive Entertainment	2008-11-07^{EU}	Unreleased	November 11, 2008	November 12, 2008	November 7, 2008
Guitar Hero III: Legends of Rock	Vicarious Visions	Activision	2007-10-28^{NA}	May 22, 2008	October 28, 2007	November 7, 2007	November 23, 2007
Guitar Hero 5	Vicarious Visions	Activision	2009-09-01^{NA}	Unreleased	September 1, 2009	September 16, 2009	September 11, 2009
Guitar Hero: Aerosmith	Vicarious Visions	Activision	2008-06-29^{NA}	October 9, 2008	June 29, 2008	August 6, 2008	July 27, 2008
Guitar Hero: Metallica	Budcat Creations	Activision	2009-03-29^{NA}	Unreleased	March 29, 2009	May 27, 2009	May 29, 2009
Guitar Hero Smash Hits; Guitar Hero Greatest Hits^{PAL}	Beenox	Activision	2009-06-16^{NA}	Unreleased	June 16, 2009	June 24, 2009	June 26, 2009
Guitar Hero: Van Halen	Budcat Creations	Activision	2009-12-22^{NA}	Unreleased	December 22, 2009	February 17, 2010	February 19, 2010
Guitar Hero: Warriors of Rock	Vicarious Visions	Activision	2010-09-24^{EU}	Unreleased	September 28, 2010	September 29, 2010	September 24, 2010
Guitar Hero World Tour	Vicarious Visions	Activision	2008-10-26^{NA}	Unreleased	October 26, 2008	November 12, 2008	November 7, 2008
Gummy Bears: Magical Medallion	Clockwork Games	Storm City Games	2011-06-21^{NA}	Unreleased	June 21, 2010	Unreleased	Unreleased
Gummy Bears Mini Golf	Beyond Reality	Storm City Games^{NA} Enjoy Gaming^{PAL}	2010-09-30^{NA}	Unreleased	September 30, 2010	September 11, 2011	September 11, 2011
Gunblade NY & L.A. Machineguns: Rise of the Machines	Sega AM3	Sega	2010-08-26^{AU}	Unreleased	August 30, 2010	August 26, 2010	August 27, 2010
Gunslingers; Western Heroes^{PAL}	Neko Entertainment	Neko Entertainment^{PAL} Valcon Games^{NA}	2010-10-29^{PAL}	Unreleased	June 28, 2011	October 29, 2010	October 29, 2010
Hamster Heroes	Data Design Interactive	Data Design Interactive	2008-05-30^{EU}	Unreleased	Unreleased	Unreleased	May 30, 2008
Haneru no Tobira Wii: Girigirissu	Namco Bandai Games	Namco Bandai Games	2007-12-06^{JP}	December 6, 2007	Unreleased	Unreleased	Unreleased
Hannah Montana: The Movie	n-Space	Disney Interactive Studios	2009-04-07^{NA}	Unreleased	April 7, 2009	June 16, 2009	May 1, 2009
Hannah Montana: Spotlight World Tour	Avalanche Software	Disney Interactive Studios	2007-11-06^{NA}	Unreleased	November 6, 2007	July 1, 2008	May 16, 2008
Happy Dance Collection	Namco Bandai Games	Namco Bandai Games	2008-10-23^{JP}	October 23, 2008	Unreleased	Unreleased	Unreleased
Happy Feet	Artificial Mind and Movement	Midway	2006-11-19^{NA}	Unreleased	November 19, 2006	December 14, 2006	December 8, 2006
Happy Feet Two	KMM Games	Warner Bros. Interactive Entertainment	2011-11-08^{NA}	Unreleased	November 8, 2011	December 8, 2011	November 11, 2011
Happy Neuron Academy	Black Sheep Studio	Bigben Interactive	2010-02-27^{EU}	Unreleased	Unreleased	Unreleased	February 27, 2010
The Hardy Boys: The Hidden Theft	XPEC Entertainment	The Adventure Company	2009-07-03^{EU}	Unreleased	September 29, 2009	Unreleased	July 3, 2009
Harley Davidson: Road Trip	N-Fusion Interactive Entertainment	Destineer	2010-06-28^{NA}	Unreleased	June 28, 2010	Unreleased	Unreleased
Harley Pasternak's Hollywood Workout	Heavy Iron Studios	Majesco	2012-09-18^{NA}	Unreleased	September 18, 2012	Unreleased	Unreleased
Harry Potter and the Deathly Hallows: Part I	EA Bright Light	Electronic Arts	2010-11-16^{NA}	Unreleased	November 16, 2010	November 18, 2010	November 19, 2010
Harry Potter and the Deathly Hallows: Part II	EA Bright Light	Electronic Arts	2011-07-12^{NA}	Unreleased	July 12, 2011	July 14, 2011	July 15, 2011
Harry Potter and the Half-Blood Prince	EA Bright Light	Electronic Arts	2009-06-30^{NA}	Unreleased	June 30, 2009	July 2, 2010	July 3, 2010
Harry Potter and the Order of the Phoenix	EA UK	Electronic Arts	2007-06-25^{NA}	August 2, 2007	June 25, 2007	June 28, 2007	June 29, 2007
Harukanaru Toki no Naka de 4	Ruby Party	Koei	2008-06-19^{JP}	June 19, 2008	Unreleased	Unreleased	Unreleased
Harvest Moon: Animal Parade	Marvelous Entertainment	Marvelous Entertainment^{JP} Natsume Inc.^{NA} Rising Star Games^{PAL}	2008-10-30^{JP}	October 30, 2008	November 12, 2009	December 23, 2010	December 3, 2010
Harvest Moon: Magical Melody	Marvelous Interactive	Rising Star Games^{PAL} Natsume Inc.^{NA}	2008-03-14^{EU}	Unreleased	August 25, 2009	April 3, 2008	March 14, 2008
Harvest Moon: Tree of Tranquility	Marvelous Interactive	Marvelous Interactive^{JP} Natsume Inc.^{NA} Rising Star Games^{PAL}	2007-06-07^{JP}	June 7, 2007	September 30, 2008	October 22, 2009	October 9, 2009
Harvey Birdman: Attorney at Law	High Voltage Software	Capcom	2008-01-08^{NA}	Unreleased	January 8, 2008	Unreleased	Unreleased
Hasbro Family Game Night	EA Bright Light	Electronic Arts	2008-11-11^{NA}	Unreleased	November 11, 2008	November 20, 2008	November 21, 2008
Hasbro Family Game Night 2	EA Bright Light	Electronic Arts	2009-10-26^{NA}	Unreleased	October 26, 2009	November 5, 2009	November 6, 2009
Hasbro Family Game Night 3	EA Bright Light	Electronic Arts	2010-10-26^{NA}	Unreleased	October 26, 2010	October 28, 2010	November 29, 2010
Hasbro Family Game Night 4: The Game Show	Wahoo Studios; EA Salt Lake	Electronic Arts	2011-11-01^{NA}	Unreleased	November 1, 2011	November 4, 2011	November 4, 2011
Haunted House	ImaginEngine	Atari	2010-10-05^{NA}	Unreleased	October 5, 2010	Unreleased	February 25, 2011
Heathcliff!: The Fast and the Furriest	EC-Interactive	Storm City Games	2010-11-05^{NA}	Unreleased	November 5, 2010	Unreleased	2010
Heatseeker	IR Gurus	Codemasters	2007-03-30^{EU}	Unreleased	May 1, 2007	April 13, 2007	March 30, 2007
Heavenly Guardian; Legend of Sayuki^{EU}	Starfish SD	Starfish SD^{JP} UFO Interactive Games^{NA} 505 Games^{EU}	2007-12-20^{JP}	December 20, 2007	April 22, 2008	Unreleased	December 5, 2008
Heavy Fire: Afghanistan	Teyon	Mastiff^{NA} Neko Entertainment^{EU}	2011-11-18^{NA}	Unreleased	November 18, 2011	Unreleased	2012
Hell's Kitchen: The Game	Ludia	Ubisoft	2008-09-09^{NA}	Unreleased	September 9, 2008	October 28, 2008	October 31, 2008
Hello Kitty Seasons	Sanrio Digital	Zoo Games^{NA} Namco Bandai Partners^{EU}	2010-12-07^{NA}	Unreleased	December 7, 2010	Unreleased	February 11, 2011
Help Wanted; Job Island: Hard Working People^{PAL}	Hudson Soft	Hudson Soft	2008-11-27^{JP}	November 27, 2008	May 12, 2009	March 27, 2009	March 13, 2009
Hidden Mysteries: Titanic	Gunnar Games	Activision^{NA} Avanquest Software^{EU}	2009-11-03^{NA}	Unreleased	November 3, 2009	Unreleased	July 30, 2010
High School Musical 3: Senior Year Dance	Page 44 Studios	Disney Interactive Studios	2008-10-21^{NA}	February 5, 2009	October 21, 2008	December 10, 2008	November 14, 2008
High School Musical: Sing It!	Artificial Mind and Movement	Disney Interactive Studios	2007-10-26^{NA}	Unreleased	October 26, 2007	November 15, 2007	November 15, 2007
The Hip Hop Dance Experience	iNiS; Land Ho!	Ubisoft	2012-11-13^{NA}	Unreleased	November 13, 2012	November 15, 2012	November 16, 2012
The History Channel: Battle for the Pacific	Magic Wand Productions	Activision	2007-12-04^{NA}	Unreleased	December 4, 2007	April 9, 2008	March 19, 2008
Hollywood Squares	Ludia	Ubisoft	2010-10-05^{NA}	Unreleased	October 5, 2010	Unreleased	Unreleased
Honda ATV Fever; ATV Fever^{PAL}	Beyond Reality	Storm City Games^{NA} Enjoy Gaming^{PAL}	2010-10-01^{NA}	Unreleased	October 1, 2010	2010	2010
Hooked! Again: Real Motion Fishing; Big Catch Bass Fishing 2^{PAL}	SIMS	Aksys Games^{NA} Arc System Works^{JP} 505 Games^{PAL}	2009-11-03^{NA}	April 28, 2010	November 3, 2009	February 18, 2010	February 12, 2010
Hooked! Real Motion Fishing; Big Catch Bass Fishing^{PAL}	SIMS	Arc System Works^{JP} Aksys Games^{NA} 505 Games^{PAL}	2007-09-27^{JP}	September 27, 2007	October 30, 2007	November 29, 2007	November 30, 2007
Horrible Histories: Ruthless Romans	Virtual Identity	Slitherine Software	2009-08-07^{EU}	Unreleased	Unreleased	Unreleased	August 7, 2009
Horrid Henry: Missions of Mischief	Asylum Entertainment	Asylum Entertainment	2010-03-26^{EU}	Unreleased	Unreleased	Unreleased	March 26, 2010
Horse Life Adventures	Neko Entertainment	Valcon Games	2010-09-18^{NA}	Unreleased	September 18, 2010	Unreleased	Unreleased
Hot Wheels: Battle Force 5	Sidhe Interactive	Activision	2009-11-12^{NA}	Unreleased	November 12, 2009	November 20, 2009	November 20, 2009
Hot Wheels: Beat That!	Eutechnyx	Activision	2007-09-30^{NA}	Unreleased	September 30, 2007	November 21, 2007	December 7, 2007
Hot Wheels: Track Attack	Firebrand Games	THQ	2010-11-23^{NA}	Unreleased	November 23, 2010	November 25, 2010	March 12, 2011
Hotel for Dogs	FarSight Studios	505 Games	2009-01-06^{NA}	Unreleased	January 6, 2009	Unreleased	February 13, 2009
The House of the Dead 2 & 3 Return	Sega; H.I.C.	Sega	2008-03-11^{NA}	March 19, 2008	March 11, 2008	March 27, 2008	March 28, 2008
The House of the Dead: Overkill	Headstrong Games	Sega	2009-02-10^{NA}	September 17, 2009	February 10, 2009	February 19, 2009	February 13, 2009
How to Train Your Dragon	Étranges Libellules	Activision	2010-03-23^{NA}	Unreleased	March 23, 2010	March 24, 2010	March 26, 2010
How to Train Your Dragon 2	Torus Games	Little Orbit	2014-06-10^{NA}	Unreleased	June 10, 2014	June 12, 2014	June 20, 2014
Hugo: Magic In The Troll Woods	Attractive Games	Rough Trade	2009-11-27^{EU}	Unreleased	Unreleased	Unreleased	November 27, 2009
Hula Wii: Hula de Hajimeru - Bi to Kenkō!	MileStone Inc.	MileStone Inc.	2008-10-29^{JP}	October 29, 2008	Unreleased	Unreleased	Unreleased
Hula Wii: Motto Jouzu no Fura o Odorou!!	MileStone Inc.	MileStone Inc.	2009-10-01^{JP}	October 1, 2009	Unreleased	Unreleased	Unreleased
Hunting Challenge	Exkee	Neko Entertainment	2009-09-25^{EU}	Unreleased	Unreleased	Unreleased	September 25, 2009
Hyper Fighters	Team6 Game Studios	Zoo Games^{NA} Funbox Media^{PAL}	2011-06-14^{NA}	Unreleased	June 14, 2011	July 27, 2012	July 27, 2012
Hysteria Hospital: Emergency Ward	GameInvest	Oxygen Games	2009-06-16^{NA}	Unreleased	June 16, 2009	August 27, 2009	July 17, 2009
I Spy Spooky Mansion	Gusto Games	Scholastic Corporation	2010-10-19^{NA}	Unreleased	October 19, 2010	Unreleased	Unreleased
I'm A Celebrity... Get Me Out of Here!	Smack Down Productions	Mindscape	2009-11-06^{EU}	Unreleased	Unreleased	Unreleased	November 6, 2009
iCarly	Blitz Games	Activision	2009-10-20^{NA}	Unreleased	October 20, 2009	November 6, 2009	November 6, 2009
iCarly 2: iJoin the Click!	Big Blue Bubble	Activision	2010-11-16^{NA}	Unreleased	November 16, 2010	November 17, 2010	November 19, 2010
Ice Age 2: The Meltdown	Eurocom	Vivendi Games	2006-12-06^{NA}	Unreleased	December 6, 2006	February 15, 2007	December 8, 2006
Ice Age: Continental Drift – Arctic Games	Behaviour Interactive	Activision	2012-06-29^{EU}	Unreleased	July 10, 2012	Unreleased	June 29, 2012
Ice Age: Dawn of the Dinosaurs	Eurocom	Activision	2009-10-24^{AUS}	Unreleased	June 30, 2009	June 24, 2009	June 26, 2009
Igor The Game	Santa Cruz Games	SouthPeak Games^{NA} Deep Silver^{PAL}	2008-09-16^{NA}	Unreleased	September 16, 2008	December 5, 2008	December 5, 2008
Ikenie no Yoru	Marvelous Entertainment	Marvelous Entertainment	2011-03-24^{JP}	March 24, 2011	Unreleased	Unreleased	Unreleased
Illvelo Wii	MileStone Inc.	MileStone Inc.	2008-11-13^{JP}	November 13, 2008	Unreleased	Unreleased	Unreleased
Imabikisō: Kaimei-hen	Chunsoft	Sega	2008-08-07^{JP}	August 7, 2008	Unreleased	Unreleased	Unreleased
Imagine Fashion Party; Imagine Fashion Idol^{PAL}	Virtual Toys; Lexis Numerique	Ubisoft	2009-01-20^{NA}	Unreleased	January 20, 2009	February 5, 2009	February 6, 2009
Imagine: Party Babyz; Babysitting Party^{PAL}	Visual Impact	Ubisoft	2008-11-11^{NA}	Unreleased	November 11, 2008	November 26, 2008	November 28, 2008
Impossible Mission	Broadsword Interactive	Codemasters^{NA} System 3^{PAL}	2007-04-04^{NA}	Unreleased	April 4, 2007	April 17, 2008	January 4, 2008
Inazuma Eleven GO Strikers 2013	Level-5	Level-5	2012-12-20^{JP}	December 20, 2012	Unreleased	Unreleased	Unreleased
Inazuma Eleven Strikers	Level-5; Shade	Level-5^{JP} Nintendo^{EU}	2011-07-16^{JP}	July 16, 2011	Unreleased	Unreleased	September 28, 2012
Inazuma Eleven Strikers 2012 Xtreme	Level-5	Level-5	2011-12-22^{JP}	December 22, 2011	Unreleased	Unreleased	Unreleased
The Incredible Hulk	Edge of Reality	Sega	2008-06-05^{NA}	Unreleased	June 5, 2008	July 3, 2008	July 4, 2008
Indiana Jones and the Staff of Kings	Artificial Mind and Movement	LucasArts	2009-06-09^{NA}	Unreleased	June 9, 2009	June 19, 2009	June 12, 2009
Indianapolis 500 Legends	Torus Games	Destineer	2007-12-14^{NA}	Unreleased	December 14, 2007	Unreleased	Unreleased
International Athletics	The Code Monkeys	Ghostlight	2010-06-25^{EU}	Unreleased	Unreleased	Unreleased	June 25, 2010
Intervilles, le jeu officiel	Smack Down Productions	Mindscape	2009-07-08^{EU}	Unreleased	Unreleased	Unreleased	July 8, 2009
Iron Chef America: Supreme Cuisine	Black Lantern Studios	Destineer	2008-11-25^{NA}	Unreleased	November 25, 2008	Unreleased	Unreleased
Iron Man	Artificial Mind and Movement	Sega	2008-05-02^{NA/EU}	Unreleased	May 2, 2008	May 8, 2008	May 2, 2008
Iron Man 2	High Voltage Software	Sega	2010-04-29^{AUS}	Unreleased	May 4, 2010	April 29, 2010	April 30, 2010
The Island of Dr. Frankenstein	Visual Impact	Storm City Games^{NA} Enjoy Gaming^{PAL}	2009-10-13^{NA}	Unreleased	October 13, 2009	January 21, 2011	January 21, 2011
Isometric & Karate Exercise: Wii de Kotsuban Fitness	IE Institute	IE Institute	2009-12-03^{JP}	December 3, 2009	Unreleased	Unreleased	Unreleased
Ivy the Kiwi?	Prope	Namco Bandai Games^{JP} Xseed Games^{NA} Rising Star Games^{PAL}	2010-04-22^{JP}	April 22, 2010	August 24, 2010	October 29, 2010	October 29, 2010
Jakers! Kart Racing	Team6 Game Studios	Nordic License Toys	2009-07-08^{EU}	Unreleased	Unreleased	Unreleased	July 8, 2009
Jambo! Safari: Animal Rescue; Jambo! Safari: Ranger Adventure^{PAL}	Full Fat	Sega	2009-11-06^{EU}	Unreleased	November 17, 2009	November 26, 2009	November 6, 2009
James Cameron's Avatar: The Game	Ubisoft Montreal	Ubisoft	2009-12-01^{NA}	Unreleased	December 1, 2009	December 3, 2009	December 4, 2009
Jawa: Mammoth to Himitsu no Ishi	Spike	Spike	2008-07-03^{JP}	July 3, 2008	Unreleased	Unreleased	Unreleased
Jaws: Ultimate Predator	Tectonic Studios	Majesco	2011-12-06^{NA}	Unreleased	December 6, 2011	Unreleased	Unreleased
Jeep Thrills	Game Sauce	DSI Games^{NA} Zoo Digital Publishing^{EU} Funbox Media^{AUS}	2008-10-14^{NA}	Unreleased	October 14, 2008	February 19, 2009	January 23, 2009
Jelly Belly Ballistic Beans	Blue Monkey Studios	Zoo Games	2009-03-27^{PAL}	Unreleased	April 21, 2009	March 27, 2009	March 27, 2009
Jenga World Tour	Atomic Planet Entertainment	Atari	2007-12-07^{NA}	Unreleased	December 7, 2007	February 21, 2008	February 22, 2008
Jeopardy!	Pipeworks Software	THQ	2010-11-02^{NA}	Unreleased	November 2, 2010	Unreleased	Unreleased
Jerry Rice & Nitus' Dog Football	Judobaby	Judobaby	2011-08-16^{NA}	Unreleased	August 16, 2011	Unreleased	Unreleased
Jewel Master: Cradle of Rome	cerasus.media	cerasus.media^{EU} Destineer^{NA}	2009-03-03^{EU}	Unreleased	March 31, 2009	Unreleased	March 3, 2009
Jewel Quest Trilogy	Gunnar Games	GameMill Entertainment^{NA} Avanquest Software^{EU}	2011-02-04^{NA}	Unreleased	February 4, 2011	Unreleased	2011
Jigsaw Puzzle: Kyo no Wanko	Hudson Soft	Hudson Soft	2007-07-26^{JP}	July 26, 2007	Unreleased	Unreleased	Unreleased
Jikkyō Powerful Major League 2009	Konami	Konami	2009-04-29^{JP}	April 29, 2009	Unreleased	Unreleased	Unreleased
Jikkyō Powerful Pro Yakyū 15	Konami	Konami	2007-07-24^{JP}	July 24, 2007	Unreleased	Unreleased	Unreleased
Jikkyō Powerful Pro Yakyū Next	Konami	Konami	2009-03-19^{JP}	March 19, 2009	Unreleased	Unreleased	Unreleased
Jikkyō Powerful Pro Yakyū Wii	Konami	Konami	2007-07-19^{JP}	July 19, 2007	Unreleased	Unreleased	Unreleased
Jikkyō Powerful Pro Yakyū Wii Ketteiban	Konami	Konami	2007-12-20^{JP}	December 20, 2007	Unreleased	Unreleased	Unreleased
Jillian Michaels' Fitness Ultimatum 2009	3G Studios	Majesco^{NA/AUS} Deep Silver^{EU}	2008-10-21^{NA}	Unreleased	October 21, 2008	June 23, 2009	June 5, 2009
Jillian Michaels' Fitness Ultimatum 2010	Collision Studios	Majesco^{NA} 505 Games^{EU}	2009-10-06^{NA}	Unreleased	October 6, 2009	Unreleased	June 25, 2010
Jillian Michaels' Fitness Ultimatum 2011	Collision Studios	D3 Publisher	2010-11-16^{NA}	Unreleased	November 16, 2010	Unreleased	Unreleased
Jimmie Johnson's Anything with an Engine	Isopod Labs	Konami	2011-11-22^{NA}	Unreleased	November 22, 2011	Unreleased	Unreleased
Jinsei Game Happy Family	Takara Tomy	Takara Tomy	2010-11-11^{JP}	November 11, 2010	Unreleased	Unreleased	Unreleased
Jinsei Game: Happy Family Gotouchi Neta Zouryou Shiage	Tomy	Takara Tomy	2011-09-01^{JP}	September 1, 2011	Unreleased	Unreleased	Unreleased
Jinsei Game Wii	Tomy	Tomy	2007-12-27^{JP}	December 27, 2007	Unreleased	Unreleased	Unreleased
Jinsei Game Wii EX	Tomy	Takara Tomy	2008-11-13^{JP}	November 13, 2008	Unreleased	Unreleased	Unreleased
Jissen Pachi-Slot Pachinko Hisshôhô! Hokuto no Ken	Sega	Sega	2007-05-24^{JP}	May 24, 2007	Unreleased	Unreleased	Unreleased
Jumper: Griffin's Story	Collision Studios	Brash Entertainment	2008-02-12^{NA}	Unreleased	February 12, 2008	April 11, 2008	March 14, 2008
JumpStart Crazy Karts	Knowledge Adventure	Knowledge Adventure	2011-04-19^{NA}	Unreleased	April 19, 2011	Unreleased	Unreleased
JumpStart: Escape from Adventure Island	Knowledge Adventure	Knowledge Adventure	2009-11-17^{NA}	Unreleased	November 17, 2009	Unreleased	Unreleased
JumpStart: Get Moving Family Fitness Sports Edition	Knowledge Adventure	Knowledge Adventure	2010-06-08^{NA}	Unreleased	June 8, 2010	Unreleased	Unreleased
JumpStart: Pet Rescue	Knowledge Adventure	Knowledge Adventure	2009-09-08^{NA}	Unreleased	September 8, 2009	Unreleased	Unreleased
Jungle Kartz	Brain in a Jar	Nordic Games	2011-10-15^{EU}	Unreleased	Unreleased	Unreleased	October 15, 2011
Junior Fitness Trainer	Avanquest Software	Avanquest Software	2010-11-19^{EU}	Unreleased	Unreleased	Unreleased	November 19, 2010
Junior League Sports	Data Design Interactive	XS Games^{NA} Funbox Media^{EU}	2010-05-15^{NA}	Unreleased	May 15, 2010	Unreleased	February 17, 2012
Ju-On: The Grudge	Feelplus	AQ Interactive^{JP} Xseed Games^{NA} Rising Star Games^{PAL}	2009-07-30^{JP}	July 30, 2009	October 13, 2009	Unreleased	October 30, 2009
Jurassic: The Hunted	Cauldron	Activision	2009-11-03^{NA}	Unreleased	November 3, 2009	Unreleased	Unreleased
Just Dance	Ubisoft Paris	Ubisoft	2009-11-17^{NA}	Unreleased	November 17, 2009	November 26, 2009	November 27, 2009
Just Dance 2	Ubisoft Paris	Ubisoft	2010-10-12^{NA}	Unreleased	October 12, 2010	October 14, 2010	October 14, 2010
Just Dance 3	Ubisoft Paris	Ubisoft	2011-10-07^{NA}	Unreleased	October 7, 2011	October 11, 2011	October 11, 2011
Just Dance 4	Ubisoft Paris; Ubisoft Reflections; Ubisoft Bucharest; Ubisoft Pune; Ubisoft Milan	Ubisoft	2012-10-02^{PAL}	Unreleased	October 9, 2012	October 2, 2012	October 2, 2012
Just Dance 2014	Ubisoft Paris; Ubisoft Reflections; Ubisoft Montpellier; Ubisoft Bucharest; Ubisoft Milan; Ubisoft Pune	Ubisoft	2013-10-01^{PAL}	Unreleased	October 8, 2013	October 1, 2013	October 1, 2013
Just Dance 2015	Ubisoft Paris; Ubisoft Reflections; Ubisoft Pune; Ubisoft Milan; Ubisoft Bucharest	Ubisoft	2014-10-21^{NA}	Unreleased	October 21, 2014	October 23, 2014	October 24, 2014
Just Dance 2016	Ubisoft Paris; Ubisoft Pune	Ubisoft	2015-10-20^{NA}	Unreleased	October 20, 2015	October 22, 2015	October 22, 2015
Just Dance 2017	Ubisoft Paris; Ubisoft Pune	Ubisoft	2016-10-25^{NA}	Unreleased	October 25, 2016	October 27, 2016	October 27, 2016
Just Dance 2018	Ubisoft Paris; Ubisoft Pune; Ubisoft Shanghai	Ubisoft	2017-10-24^{NA}	Unreleased	October 24, 2017	October 26, 2017	October 26, 2017
Just Dance 2019	Ubisoft Paris; Ubisoft Pune; Ubisoft Shanghai	Ubisoft	2018-10-23^{NA}	Unreleased	October 23, 2018	October 25, 2018	October 25, 2018
Just Dance 2020	Ubisoft Paris; Ubisoft Pune; Ubisoft Shanghai; Ubisoft Bordeaux	Ubisoft	2019-11-05^{WW}	Unreleased	November 5, 2019	November 5, 2019	November 5, 2019
Just Dance: Best Of; Just Dance: Greatest Hits^{NA}	Ubisoft Paris	Ubisoft	2012-03-29^{AU}	Unreleased	June 26, 2012	March 29, 2012	March 30, 2012
Just Dance: Disney Party	Land Ho!	Ubisoft	2012-10-23^{NA}	Unreleased	October 23, 2012	October 25, 2012	October 26, 2012
Just Dance: Disney Party 2	Ubisoft San Francisco	Ubisoft	2015-10-20^{WW}	Unreleased	October 20, 2015	October 20, 2015	October 20, 2015
Just Dance Kids; Dance Juniors^{PAL}	Land Ho!	Ubisoft	2010-11-09^{NA}	Unreleased	November 9, 2010	February 3, 2011	February 4, 2011
Just Dance Kids 2 Just Dance Kids^{PAL}	Land Ho!	Ubisoft	2011-10-25^{NA}	Unreleased	October 25, 2011	November 3, 2011	November 4, 2011
Just Dance Kids 2014	Ubisoft Osaka	Ubisoft	2013-10-22^{NA}	Unreleased	October 22, 2013	October 24, 2013	October 25, 2013
Just Dance: Summer Party; Just Dance 2: Extra Songs^{PAL}	Ubisoft Paris	Ubisoft	2011-07-15^{UK}	Unreleased	July 19, 2011	July 21, 2011	July 15, 2011^{UK} July 21, 2011^{EU}
Just Dance Wii	Ubisoft Paris	Nintendo	2011-10-13^{JP}	October 13, 2011	Unreleased	Unreleased	Unreleased
Just Dance Wii 2	Ubisoft Paris	Nintendo	2012-07-26^{JP}	July 26, 2012	Unreleased	Unreleased	Unreleased
K-Pop Dance Festival	Skonec Entertainment	Skonec Entertainment	2013-04-25^{KOR}	April 25, 2013	Unreleased	Unreleased	Unreleased
K11: Kommissare im Einsatz	Sproing Interactive	SevenOne Intermedia	2010-04-14^{EU}	Unreleased	Unreleased	Unreleased	April 14, 2010
Kamen Rider: Climax Heroes Fourze	Eighting	Namco Bandai Games	2011-12-01^{JP}	December 1, 2011	Unreleased	Unreleased	Unreleased
Kamen Rider: Climax Heroes OOO	Eighting	Namco Bandai Games	2010-12-02^{JP}	December 2, 2010	Unreleased	Unreleased	Unreleased
Kamen Rider: Climax Heroes W	Eighting	Namco Bandai Games	2009-12-03^{JP}	December 3, 2009	Unreleased	Unreleased	Unreleased
Kamen Rider: Dragon Knight	Eighting	D3 Publisher	2009-11-17^{NA}	Unreleased	November 17, 2009	Unreleased	Unreleased
Kamen Rider: Super Climax Heroes	Eighting	Namco Bandai Games	2012-11-29^{JP}	November 29, 2012	Unreleased	Unreleased	Unreleased
Kanken Wii: Kanji Ou Kettei Sen	Rocket Company	Rocket Company	2007-12-27^{JP}	December 27, 2007	Unreleased	Unreleased	Unreleased
Karaoke Joysound	Hudson Soft; Xing	Hudson Soft^{JP} Konami^{NA}	2008-12-18^{JP}	December 18, 2008	October 30, 2012	Unreleased	Unreleased
Karaoke Joysound DX	Hudson Soft; Xing	Hudson Soft	2009-11-26^{JP}	November 26, 2009	Unreleased	Unreleased	Unreleased
Karaoke Joysound: Duet Song	Hudson Soft; Xing	Hudson Soft	2010-06-10^{JP}	June 10, 2010	Unreleased	Unreleased	Unreleased
Karaoke Joysound: Enka	Hudson Soft; Xing	Hudson Soft	2010-06-10^{JP}	June 10, 2010	Unreleased	Unreleased	Unreleased
Karaoke Joysound: Super DX: Hitori de Minna de Utai Houdai!	Hudson Soft; Xing	Hudson Soft	2010-12-09^{JP}	December 9, 2010	Unreleased	Unreleased	Unreleased
Karaoke Revolution	Blitz Games	Konami	2009-11-24^{NA}	Unreleased	November 24, 2009	Unreleased	February 12, 2010
Karaoke Revolution Glee	Hijinx Studios	Konami	2010-11-09^{NA}	Unreleased	November 9, 2010	December 2, 2010	November 16, 2010
Karaoke Revolution Glee: Volume 2	Hijinx Studios	Konami	2011-04-05^{NA}	Unreleased	April 5, 2011	May 12, 2011	May 13, 2011
Karaoke Revolution Glee: Volume 3	Hijinx Studios	Konami	2011-11-22^{NA}	Unreleased	November 22, 2011	December 1, 2011	December 2, 2011
Karaoke Revolution Presents: American Idol Encore	Blitz Games	Konami	2008-02-05^{NA}	Unreleased	February 5, 2008	Unreleased	Unreleased
Karaoke Revolution Presents: American Idol Encore 2	Blitz Games	Konami	2008-11-18^{NA}	Unreleased	November 18, 2008	Unreleased	Unreleased
Kart Racer	Brain in a Jar	Nordic Games^{PAL} Maximum Family Games^{NA}	2009-08-10^{EU}	Unreleased	March 16, 2011	March 18, 2011	August 10, 2009
Katekyō Hitman Reborn! Dream Hyper Battle!	Marvelous Entertainment	Marvelous Entertainment	2008-01-10^{JP}	January 10, 2008	Unreleased	Unreleased	Unreleased
Katekyō Hitman Reborn! Kindan no Yami no Delta	Marvelous Entertainment	Marvelous Entertainment	2008-11-20^{JP}	November 20, 2008	Unreleased	Unreleased	Unreleased
Kawasaki Jet Ski	Data Design Interactive	Bold Games^{NA} Data Design Interactive^{PAL}	2008-01-22^{NA}	Unreleased	January 22, 2008	May 15, 2008	April 25, 2008
Kawasaki Quad Bikes	Data Design Interactive	Bold Games^{NA} Data Design Interactive^{PAL}	2007-10-26^{NA}	Unreleased	October 26, 2007	May 1, 2008	March 14, 2008
Kawasaki Snowmobiles	Data Design Interactive	Bold Games^{NA} Data Design Interactive^{PAL}	2008-05-28^{NA}	Unreleased	May 28, 2008	Unreleased	June 6, 2008
Kekkaishi: Kokubōrō no Kage	Namco Bandai Games	Namco Bandai Games	2007-09-27^{JP}	September 27, 2007	Unreleased	Unreleased	Unreleased
Kevin Van Dam's Big Bass Challenge	Digital Embryo	Zoo Games	2010-11-23^{NA}	Unreleased	November 23, 2010	Unreleased	Unreleased
Kid Adventures: Sky Captain; Stunt Flyer: Hero of the Sky^{EU}	Torus Games	D3 Publisher^{NA} Just A Game^{EU}	2010-05-15^{NA}	Unreleased	May 15, 2010	Unreleased	October 20, 2011
Kid Fit Island Resort	Teyon	Red Wagon Games	2010-10-26^{NA}	Unreleased	October 26, 2010	Unreleased	Unreleased
Kid Paddle: Lost in the Game	Mistic Software	Atari Europe	2008-11-28^{EU}	Unreleased	Unreleased	Unreleased	November 28, 2008
Kidz Bop: Dance Party! - The Video Game	Art Co., Ltd	D3 Publisher	2010-09-14^{NA}	Unreleased	September 14, 2010	Unreleased	Unreleased
Kidz Sports Basketball	Data Design Interactive	Bold Games^{NA} Data Design Interactive^{PAL}	2008-01-02^{NA}	Unreleased	January 2, 2008	May 15, 2008	March 14, 2008
Kidz Sports Crazy Mini Golf; Kidz Sports: Crazy Golf^{NA}	Data Design Interactive	Bold Games^{NA} Data Design Interactive^{PAL}	2008-09-16^{NA}	Unreleased	September 16, 2008	November 13, 2008	November 7, 2008
Kidz Sports: Crazy Mini Golf 2 Crazy Mini Golf 2^{NA}	Data Design Interactive	XS Games^{NA} Green Solutions^{PAL}	2009-11-05^{NA}	Unreleased	November 5, 2009	December 28, 2011	December 28, 2011
Kidz Sports Ice Hockey	Data Design Interactive	Bold Games^{NA} Data Design Interactive^{PAL}	2008-01-14^{NA}	Unreleased	January 14, 2008	May 15, 2008	March 14, 2008
Kidz Sports International Football; Kidz Sports International Soccer^{NA}	Data Design Interactive	Bold Games^{NA} Data Design Interactive^{PAL}	2008-02-22^{NA}	Unreleased	February 22, 2008	May 15, 2008	May 30, 2008
Kiki Trick	Nintendo SPD	Nintendo	2012-01-19^{JP}	January 19, 2012	Unreleased	Unreleased	Unreleased
King of Clubs	Oxygen Studios	Oxygen Games^{PAL} Crave Entertainment^{NA}	2008-03-28^{EU}	Unreleased	July 31, 2008	November 13, 2008	March 28, 2008
The King of Fighters Collection: The Orochi Saga	Terminal Reality	SNK Playmore^{NA/KOR} Ignition Entertainment^{EU}	2008-12-02^{NA}	September 30, 2009	December 2, 2008	Unreleased	March 13, 2009
King of Pool	Ivolgamus	Nordcurrent	2009-06-05^{EU}	Unreleased	Unreleased	2009	June 5, 2009
Kirby's Dream Collection Special Edition	HAL Laboratory	Nintendo	2012-07-19^{JP}	July 19, 2012	September 16, 2012	Unreleased	Unreleased
Kirby's Epic Yarn	Good-Feel	Nintendo	2010-10-14^{JP}	October 14, 2010	October 17, 2010	February 24, 2011	February 25, 2011
Kirby's Return to Dream Land; Kirby's Adventure Wii^{PAL}	HAL Laboratory	Nintendo	2011-10-24^{NA}	October 27, 2011	October 24, 2011	December 1, 2011	November 25, 2011
Klonoa	Paon	Namco Bandai Games	2008-12-04^{JP}	December 4, 2008	May 5, 2009	June 23, 2009	May 22, 2009
Knockout Party; Team Elimination Games^{NA}	Hydravision Entertainment	Ubisoft	2009-11-05^{AUS}	Unreleased	November 10, 2009	November 5, 2009	November 6, 2009
The Kore Gang	Zoink; SnapDragon Games; Unique Development Studios	Pixonauts^{EU} Atari^{NA}	2010-08-11^{EU}	Unreleased	November 8, 2011	Unreleased	August 11, 2010
Kororinpa; Kororinpa: Marble Mania^{NA}	Hudson Soft	Hudson Soft^{JP/NA} Nintendo^{PAL}	2006-12-02^{JP}	December 2, 2006	March 20, 2007	March 1, 2007	February 23, 2007
Kotoba no Puzzle: Mojipittan Wii Deluxe	Namco Bandai Games	Namco Bandai Games	2008-11-27^{JP}	November 27, 2008	Unreleased	Unreleased	Unreleased
Kung Fu Panda	XPEC Entertainment	Activision	2008-06-03^{NA}	July 24, 2008	June 3, 2008	June 25, 2008	June 27, 2008
Kung Fu Panda 2	Griptonite Games	THQ	2011-05-24^{NA}	Unreleased	May 24, 2011	May 28, 2011	June 7, 2011
Kung Fu Panda: Legendary Warriors	Artificial Mind and Movement	Activision	2008-11-04^{NA}	Unreleased	November 4, 2008	December 5, 2008	November 14, 2008
Kylie: Sing & Dance	Tubby Games	Tubby Games	2012-12-07^{EU}	Unreleased	Unreleased	December 20, 2012	December 7, 2012
L'esprit du Loup	Strass Games	Tradewest	2009-12-04^{EU}	Unreleased	Unreleased	Unreleased	December 4, 2009
La Voz Vol. 2	Wired Productions	Badland Games	2014-10-17^{EU}	Unreleased	Unreleased	Unreleased	October 17, 2014
La Voz Vol. 3	Le Cortex	Badland Games	2015-11-13^{EU}	Unreleased	Unreleased	Unreleased	November 13, 2015
The Last Airbender	THQ Studio Australia	THQ	2010-06-29^{NA}	Unreleased	June 29, 2010	September 9, 2010	August 6, 2010
The Last Story	Mistwalker; AQ Interactive	Nintendo^{WW} Xseed Games^{NA}	2011-01-27^{JP}	January 27, 2011	August 14, 2012	February 23, 2012	February 24, 2012
The Legend of Spyro: Dawn of the Dragon	Étranges Libellules	Activision^{NA} Vivendi Games^{PAL}	2008-10-21^{NA}	Unreleased	October 21, 2008	November 5, 2008	November 21, 2008
The Legend of Spyro: The Eternal Night	Krome Studios	Vivendi Games	2007-10-18^{NA}	Unreleased	October 18, 2007	December 6, 2007	December 14, 2007
Legend of the Dragon	Neko Entertainment	The Game Factory	2007-05-01^{NA}	Unreleased	May 1, 2007	June 28, 2007	June 15, 2007
Legend of the Guardians: The Owls of Ga'Hoole	Krome Studios	Warner Bros. Interactive Entertainment	2010-09-14^{NA}	Unreleased	September 14, 2010	September 29, 2010	October 8, 2010
The Legend of Zelda: Skyward Sword	Nintendo EAD; Monolith Soft	Nintendo	2011-11-18^{EU}	November 23, 2011	November 20, 2011	November 24, 2011	November 18, 2011
The Legend of Zelda: Twilight Princess	Nintendo EAD	Nintendo	2006-11-19^{NA}	December 2, 2006	November 19, 2006	December 7, 2006	December 8, 2006
Lego Batman 2: DC Super Heroes	Traveller's Tales	Warner Bros. Interactive Entertainment	2012-06-19^{NA}	Unreleased	June 19, 2012	June 27, 2012	June 22, 2012
Lego Batman: The Videogame	Traveller's Tales	Warner Bros. Interactive Entertainment	2008-09-23^{NA}	Unreleased	September 23, 2008	October 15, 2008	October 10, 2008
Lego Harry Potter: Years 1–4	Traveller's Tales	Warner Bros. Interactive Entertainment	2010-06-25^{EU}	Unreleased	June 29, 2010	June 30, 2010	June 25, 2010
Lego Harry Potter: Years 5–7	Traveller's Tales	Warner Bros. Interactive Entertainment	2011-11-11^{NA}	Unreleased	November 11, 2011	November 16, 2011	November 18, 2011
Lego Indiana Jones 2: The Adventure Continues	Traveller's Tales	LucasArts	2009-11-17^{NA}	Unreleased	November 17, 2009	November 25, 2009	November 20, 2009
Lego Indiana Jones: The Original Adventures	Traveller's Tales	LucasArts	2008-06-03^{NA}	Unreleased	June 3, 2008	June 4, 2008	June 6, 2008
Lego The Lord of the Rings	Traveller's Tales	Warner Bros. Interactive Entertainment	2012-11-13^{NA}	Unreleased	November 13, 2012	December 5, 2012	November 23, 2012
Lego Pirates of the Caribbean: The Video Game	Traveller's Tales	Disney Interactive Studios	2011-05-10^{NA}	Unreleased	May 10, 2011	May 19, 2011	May 13, 2011
Lego Rock Band	TT Fusion; Harmonix	Warner Bros. Interactive Entertainment	2009-11-03^{NA}	Unreleased	November 3, 2009	November 25, 2009	November 27, 2009
Lego Star Wars: The Complete Saga	Traveller's Tales	LucasArts^{WW} Activision^{JP}	2007-11-06^{NA}	March 27, 2008	November 6, 2007	November 7, 2007	November 16, 2007
Lego Star Wars III: The Clone Wars	Traveller's Tales	LucasArts	2011-03-22^{NA}	Unreleased	March 22, 2011	March 30, 2011	March 25, 2011
Lernerfolg Grundschule Deutsch	Tivola	Tivola	2010^{EU}	Unreleased	Unreleased	Unreleased	2010
Lernerfolg Grundschule Englisch	Tivola	Tivola	2010^{EU}	Unreleased	Unreleased	Unreleased	2010
Lernerfolg Grundschule Mathematik	Tivola	Tivola	2010^{EU}	Unreleased	Unreleased	Unreleased	2010
Lernerfolg Grundschule Power Mathe	Tivola	Tivola	2010^{EU}	Unreleased	Unreleased	Unreleased	2010
Let's Dance with Mel B Let's Dance^{NA}	Lightning Fish	Black Bean Games^{EU} Maximum Family Games^{NA}	2011-06-24^{EU}	Unreleased	April 24, 2012	Unreleased	June 24, 2011
Let's Paint	Frontline Studios	Zoo Games	2010-06-01^{NA}	Unreleased	June 1, 2010	Unreleased	Unreleased
Let's Play Ballerina	ZigZagIsland	Deep Silver	2010-04-23^{EU}	Unreleased	June 8, 2010	Unreleased	April 23, 2010
Let's Play Garden	ZigZagIsland	Deep Silver	2010-05-25^{NA}	Unreleased	May 25, 2010	Unreleased	Unreleased
Let's Sing; Let's Sing 5: Version Española^{ES}	Voxler	Deep Silver	2012-10-19^{EU}	Unreleased	Unreleased	Unreleased	October 19, 2012
Let's Sing 2014; Let's Sing 6: Version Española^{ES}	Voxler	Deep Silver	2013-11-08^{EU}	Unreleased	Unreleased	Unreleased	November 8, 2013
Let's Sing 2015; Let's Sing 7: Version Española^{ES}	Voxler	Deep Silver	2014-10-24^{EU}	Unreleased	Unreleased	Unreleased	October 24, 2014
Let's Sing 2016; Let's Sing 8: Version Española^{ES}	Voxler	Ravenscourt^{EU} Maximum Family Games^{NA}	2015-10-23^{EU}	Unreleased	November 17, 2015	Unreleased	October 23, 2015
Let's Sing 2016: Hits Français	Voxler	Ravenscourt	2015-10-23^{EU}	Unreleased	Unreleased	Unreleased	November 6, 2015
Let's Sing 2017; Let's Sing 9: Version Española^{ES}	Voxler	Ravenscourt	2016-10-14^{EU}	Unreleased	Unreleased	Unreleased	October 14, 2016
Let's Sing 2018	Voxler	Ravenscourt	2017-10-20^{EU}	Unreleased	Unreleased	Unreleased	October 20, 2017
Let's Sing 2019	Voxler	Ravenscourt	2018-10-26^{EU}	Unreleased	Unreleased	Unreleased	October 26, 2018
Let's Sing @ Radio Italia	Voxler	Deep Silver	2015-11-06^{EU}	Unreleased	Unreleased	Unreleased	November 6, 2015
Let's Tap	Prope	Sega	2008-12-18^{JP}	December 18, 2008	June 16, 2009	June 19, 2009	June 19, 2009
Line Rider 2: Unbound; Line Rider: Freestyle^{EU}	inXile Entertainment	Genius Products^{NA} Deep Silver^{EU}	2008-10-07^{NA}	Unreleased	October 7, 2008	Unreleased	July 31, 2009
Link's Crossbow Training	Nintendo EAD	Nintendo	2007-11-19^{NA}	May 1, 2008	November 19, 2007	December 13, 2007	December 7, 2007
Little King's Story	Cing; Town Factory	Rising Star Games^{PAL} Xseed Games^{NA} Marvelous Entertainment^{JP}	2009-04-22^{AUS}	September 3, 2009	July 21, 2009	April 22, 2009	April 24, 2009
Little League World Series Baseball 2008	Now Production	Activision	2008-08-05^{NA}	Unreleased	August 5, 2008	March 4, 2009	February 13, 2009
Little League World Series Baseball 2009	Now Production	Activision	2009-06-23^{NA}	Unreleased	June 23, 2009	Unreleased	Unreleased
Littlest Pet Shop	EA Salt Lake	Electronic Arts	2008-10-14^{NA}	Unreleased	October 14, 2008	October 23, 2008	October 17, 2008
Littlest Pet Shop: Friends	EA Salt Lake	Electronic Arts	2009-10-16^{EU}	Unreleased	October 20, 2009	October 20, 2009	October 16, 2009
London Taxi: Rush Hour	Data Design Interactive	Bold Games^{NA} Data Design Interactive^{PAL}	2008-02-12^{NA}	Unreleased	February 12, 2008	May 15, 2008	April 18, 2008
Looney Tunes: Acme Arsenal	Redtribe	Warner Bros. Interactive Entertainment	2007-10-09^{NA}	Unreleased	October 9, 2007	February 6, 2008	November 30, 2007
The Lord of the Rings: Aragorn's Quest	Headstrong Games	Warner Bros. Interactive Entertainment	2010-09-14^{NA}	Unreleased	September 14, 2010	October 27, 2010	October 29, 2010
Los 40 Principales Karaoke Party	Le Cortex	Bandai Namco Games	2014-11-28^{EU}	Unreleased	Unreleased	Unreleased	November 28, 2014
Los 40 Principales Karaoke Party 2	Le Cortex	Wired Productions	2015-11-13^{EU}	Unreleased	Unreleased	Unreleased	November 13, 2015
Lost in Blue: Shipwrecked	Hudson Soft	Konami	2008-08-07^{JP}	August 7, 2008	September 23, 2008	Unreleased	December 4, 2008
Lost in Shadow; A Shadow's Tale^{PAL}	Hudson Soft	Hudson Soft	2010-07-22^{JP}	July 22, 2010	January 4, 2011	October 8, 2010	October 15, 2010
Love is... in bloom: The Flower Shop Garden	Elephant Games	Zushi Games	2009-09-18^{EU}	Unreleased	Unreleased	September 18, 2009	September 18, 2009
Lucha Libre AAA: Héroes del Ring	Sabarasa Entertainment	Slang Publishing	2011-05-28^{NA}	Unreleased	May 28, 2011	Unreleased	Unreleased
Luxor 3	MumboJumbo	MumboJumbo	2008-11-11^{NA}	Unreleased	November 11, 2008	Unreleased	Unreleased
Luxor: Pharaoh's Challenge	MumboJumbo	MumboJumbo^{NA} Codemasters^{PAL}	2008-01-15^{NA}	Unreleased	January 15, 2008	August 22, 2008	May 30, 2008
M&M's Adventure	Nikitova Games	Zoo Games	2008-12-03^{NA}	Unreleased	December 3, 2008	Unreleased	Unreleased
M&M's Beach Party	Digital Embryo	Zoo Games	2009-03-11^{NA}	Unreleased	March 11, 2009	Unreleased	Unreleased
M&M's Kart Racing	Frontline Studios; Calaris Studios	DSI Games	2007-12-05^{NA}	Unreleased	December 5, 2007	Unreleased	Unreleased
Madagascar 3: The Video Game	Monkey Bar Games	D3 Publisher	2012-06-05^{NA}	Unreleased	June 5, 2012	September 6, 2012	October 12, 2012
Madagascar: Escape 2 Africa	Toys for Bob	Activision	2008-11-04^{NA}	Unreleased	November 4, 2008	November 26, 2008	November 28, 2008
Madagascar Kartz	Sidhe Interactive	Activision	2009-10-27^{NA}	Unreleased	October 27, 2009	December 9, 2009	November 6, 2009
Madden NFL 07	EA Canada; HB Studios	EA Sports	2006-11-19^{NA}	Unreleased	November 19, 2006	December 7, 2006	December 8, 2006
Madden NFL 08	EA Tiburon	EA Sports	2007-08-14^{NA}	Unreleased	August 14, 2007	August 30, 2007	August 31, 2007
Madden NFL 09	EA Tiburon	EA Sports	2008-08-12^{NA}	Unreleased	August 12, 2008	August 21, 2008	August 15, 2008
Madden NFL 10	EA Tiburon	EA Sports	2009-08-13^{AUS}	Unreleased	August 14, 2009	August 13, 2009	August 14, 2009
Madden NFL 11	EA Tiburon	EA Sports	2010-08-10^{NA}	Unreleased	August 10, 2010	Unreleased	Unreleased
Madden NFL 12	HB Studios	EA Sports	2011-08-30^{NA}	Unreleased	August 30, 2011	Unreleased	Unreleased
Madden NFL 13	EA Tiburon	EA Sports	2012-08-28^{NA}	Unreleased	August 28, 2012	Unreleased	Unreleased
Mad Dog McCree: Gunslinger Pack	Digital Leisure	Majesco	2009-06-16^{NA}	Unreleased	June 16, 2009	Unreleased	August 28, 2009
Mad Tracks	Load	Neko Entertainment	2009-12-08^{EU}	Unreleased	Unreleased	Unreleased	December 8, 2009
MadWorld	PlatinumGames	Sega^{WW} Spike^{JP}	2009-03-10^{NA}	February 10, 2010	March 10, 2009	March 26, 2009	March 20, 2009
The Magic Roundabout	Black Sheep Studio	Deep Silver	2008-12-12^{PAL}	Unreleased	Unreleased	December 12, 2008	December 12, 2008
Mahjong Kakutou Club Wii: Wi-Fi Taiou	Konami	Konami	2009-04-29^{JP}	April 29, 2009	Unreleased	Unreleased	Unreleased
Mahjong Party Pack	Webfoot Technologies	White Park Bay Software	2009-12-15^{EU}	Unreleased	Unreleased	Unreleased	December 15, 2009
Mahjong Taikai Wii	Koei	Koei	2007-01-25^{JP}	January 25, 2007	Unreleased	Unreleased	Unreleased
Mahō Sensei Negima!? Neo-Pactio Fight!!	Shade	Marvelous Entertainment	2007-06-14^{JP}	June 14, 2007	Unreleased	Unreleased	Unreleased
Major Dream: Major Wii Nagero! Gyroball!!	DreamFactory	Takara Tomy	2008-02-07^{JP}	February 7, 2008	Unreleased	Unreleased	Unreleased
Major Dream: Major Wii Perfect Closer	DreamFactory	Takara Tomy	2008-12-11^{JP}	December 11, 2008	Unreleased	Unreleased	Unreleased
Major League Baseball 2K8	2K Los Angeles; 2K China	2K Sports	2008-03-04^{NA}	Unreleased	March 4, 2008	Unreleased	Unreleased
Major League Baseball 2K9	2K China	2K Sports	2009-03-03^{NA}	Unreleased	March 3, 2009	Unreleased	Unreleased
Major League Baseball 2K10	2K China	2K Sports	2010-03-02^{NA}	Unreleased	March 2, 2010	Unreleased	Unreleased
Major League Baseball 2K11	2K China	2K Sports	2011-03-08^{NA}	Unreleased	March 8, 2011	Unreleased	Unreleased
Major League Baseball 2K12	2K China; Virtuos	2K Sports	2012-03-06^{NA}	Unreleased	March 6, 2012	Unreleased	Unreleased
Major Minor's Majestic March	NanaOn-Sha	Majesco^{NA/EU} Square Enix^{JP}	2009-03-24^{NA}	April 23, 2009	March 24, 2009	Unreleased	June 26, 2009
Manhunt 2	Rockstar Toronto	Rockstar Games	2007-10-29^{NA}	Unreleased	October 29, 2007	Unreleased	October 31, 2008
Man vs. Wild	Floor 84 Studios; Scientifically Proven	Crave Entertainment	2011-04-26^{NA}	Unreleased	April 26, 2011	Unreleased	Unreleased
Marble Saga: Kororinpa; Marbles! Balance Challenge^{PAL}	Hudson Soft	Hudson Soft	2009-03-17^{NA}	August 6, 2009	March 17, 2009	May 1, 2009	May 1, 2009
Margot's Bepuzzled!	puzzle.tv	Zushi Games^{EU} Funbox Media^{AUS}	2009-11-06^{EU}	Unreleased	Unreleased	2012	November 6, 2009
Margot's Word Brain	Slam Productions	Zoo Games	2008-09-23^{NA}	Unreleased	September 23, 2008	November 7, 2008	November 7, 2008
Marines: Modern Urban Combat	Destineer	Destineer^{NA} OG International^{PAL}	2010-01-26^{NA}	Unreleased	January 26, 2010	September 10, 2010	September 10, 2010
Mario & Sonic at the London 2012 Olympic Games	Sega; Racjin	Sega^{WW} Nintendo^{JP/KO}	2011-11-15^{NA}	December 8, 2011	November 15, 2011	November 17, 2011	November 18, 2011
Mario & Sonic at the Olympic Games	Sega Sports R&D	Sega^{WW} Nintendo^{JP/KO}	2007-11-06^{NA}	November 22, 2007	November 6, 2007	November 22, 2007	November 23, 2007
Mario & Sonic at the Olympic Winter Games	Sega; Racjin	Sega^{WW} Nintendo^{JP/KO}	2009-10-13^{NA}	November 5, 2009	October 13, 2009	October 16, 2009	October 15, 2009
Mario Kart Wii	Nintendo EAD	Nintendo	2008-04-10^{JP}	April 10, 2008	April 27, 2008	April 24, 2008	April 11, 2008
Mario Party 8	Hudson Soft	Nintendo	2007-05-29^{NA}	July 26, 2007	May 29, 2007	July 19, 2007	June 22, 2007
Mario Party 9	NDcube	Nintendo	2012-03-02^{EU}	April 26, 2012	March 11, 2012	March 8, 2012	March 2, 2012
New Play Control! Mario Power Tennis	Camelot Software Planning	Nintendo	2009-01-15^{JP}	January 15, 2009	March 9, 2009	March 26, 2009	March 6, 2009
Mario Sports Mix	Square Enix	Nintendo	2010-11-25^{JP}	November 25, 2010	February 7, 2011	January 27, 2011	January 28, 2011
Mario Strikers Charged; Mario Strikers Charged Football^{PAL}	Next Level Games	Nintendo	2007-05-25^{EU}	September 20, 2007	July 30, 2007	June 7, 2007	May 25, 2007
Mario Super Sluggers	Namco Bandai Games	Nintendo	2008-06-19^{JP}	June 19, 2008	August 25, 2008	Unreleased	Unreleased
Martian Panic	N-Fusion Interactive Entertainment	Zoo Games^{NA} Funbox Media^{PAL}	2010-08-24^{NA}	Unreleased	August 24, 2010	November 25, 2011	November 25, 2011
Marvel Super Hero Squad	Blue Tongue Entertainment	THQ	2009-10-20^{NA}	Unreleased	October 20, 2009	October 21, 2009	October 23, 2009
Marvel Super Hero Squad: Comic Combat	Griptonite Games	THQ	2011-11-15^{NA}	Unreleased	November 15, 2011	November 17, 2011	November 18, 2011
Marvel Super Hero Squad: The Infinity Gauntlet	Griptonite Games	THQ	2010-11-16^{NA}	Unreleased	November 16, 2010	November 19, 2010	November 19, 2010
Marvel Super Heroes 3D: Grandmaster's Challenge	Neko Entertainment	Neko Entertainment	2010-11-26^{EU}	Unreleased	Unreleased	Unreleased	November 26, 2010
Marvel: Ultimate Alliance	Vicarious Visions	Activision	2006-11-19^{NA}	May 17, 2007	November 19, 2006	December 21, 2006	December 22, 2006
Marvel: Ultimate Alliance 2	n-Space	Activision	2009-09-15^{NA}	Unreleased	September 15, 2009	September 23, 2009	September 25, 2009
Mary King's Riding School 2	Dancing Dots	Ghostlight	2009-09-11^{PAL}	Unreleased	Unreleased	September 11, 2009	September 11, 2009
Mathews Bowhunting	Collision Studios	Zoo Games	2010-10-19^{NA}	Unreleased	October 19, 2010	Unreleased	Unreleased
Max & the Magic Marker	Press Play	Easy Interactive	2011-07-30^{EU}	Unreleased (Note: Released via WiiWare.)	Unreleased (Note: Released via WiiWare.)	Unreleased (Note: Released via WiiWare.)	July 30, 2011 (Note: Date shown is for disc version.)
Maximum Racing: Crash Car Racer; Crash Car Racer^{PAL}	Brain in a Jar	Nordic Games^{PAL} Maximum Family Games^{NA}	2010-11-27^{PAL}	Unreleased	March 29, 2011	November 27, 2010	November 27, 2010
Maximum Racing: Drag and Stock Racer; Drag & Stock Racer^{PAL}	Brain in a Jar	Nordic Games^{PAL} Maximum Family Games^{NA}	2010-10-28^{PAL}	Unreleased	March 14, 2011	October 28, 2010	October 28, 2010
Maximum Racing: GP Classic Racing; GP Classic Racing^{PAL}	Brain in a Jar	Nordic Games^{PAL} Maximum Family Games^{NA}	2010-08-03^{PAL}	Unreleased	March 14, 2011	August 3, 2010	August 3, 2010
Maximum Racing: Rally Racer; Rally Racer^{PAL}	Brain in a Jar	Nordic Games^{PAL} Maximum Family Games^{NA}	2010-08-06^{PAL}	Unreleased	March 29, 2011	August 6, 2010	August 6, 2010
Maximum Racing: Sprint Cars; Sprint Cars^{PAL}	Brain in a Jar	Nordic Games^{PAL} Maximum Family Games^{NA}	2011-02-25^{AUS}	Unreleased	May 31, 2011	February 25, 2011	May 27, 2011
Maximum Racing: Super Karts; Super Karts^{PAL}	Brain in a Jar	Nordic Games^{PAL} Maximum Family Games^{NA}	2011-01-21^{PAL}	Unreleased	June 21, 2011	January 21, 2011	January 21, 2011
Maximum Racing: Super Truck Racer; Super Truck Racer^{PAL}	Brain in a Jar	Nordic Games^{PAL} Maximum Family Games^{NA}	2010-12-17^{PAL}	Unreleased	May 31, 2011	December 17, 2010	December 17, 2010
Medal of Honor: Heroes 2	EA Canada	Electronic Arts	2007-11-13^{NA}	February 14, 2008	November 13, 2007	February 7, 2008	February 8, 2008
Medal of Honor: Vanguard	Budcat Creations	Electronic Arts	2007-03-26^{NA}	Unreleased	March 26, 2007	March 29, 2007	March 30, 2007
Medieval Games	N-Fusion Interactive Entertainment	Vir2L Studios	2009-10-20^{NA}	Unreleased	October 20, 2009	November 19, 2009	November 27, 2009
Meet the Robinsons	Avalanche Software	Disney Interactive Studios	2007-03-27^{NA}	December 20, 2007	March 27, 2007	March 29, 2007	March 30, 2007
Megamind: Mega Team Unite	THQ Studio Australia	THQ	2010-11-02^{NA}	Unreleased	November 2, 2010	November 25, 2010	November 26, 2010
Mein neues Leben: Abenteuer auf Tropicana	Caipirinha Games	SevenOne Intermedia	2011-12-23^{EU}	Unreleased	Unreleased	Unreleased	December 23, 2011
Meine Tierarztpraxis: SOS am Ozean	Neopica; Sproing Interactive	DTP Entertainment	2010-09-24^{EU}	Unreleased	Unreleased	Unreleased	September 24, 2010
Mercury Meltdown Revolution	Ignition Banbury	Ignition Entertainment	2007-03-26^{AUS}	August 27, 2009	October 17, 2007	March 26, 2007	June 8, 2007
Merv Griffin's Crosswords	Pipeworks Software	THQ	2008-11-20^{NA}	Unreleased	November 20, 2008	Unreleased	Unreleased
Metal Slug Anthology	Terminal Reality	SNK Playmore^{NA/JP} Ignition Entertainment^{PAL}	2006-12-14^{NA}	December 27, 2007	December 14, 2006	March 26, 2007	March 30, 2007
Metroid: Other M	Team Ninja; Nintendo SPD	Nintendo	2010-08-31^{NA}	September 2, 2010	August 31, 2010	September 2, 2010	September 3, 2010
New Play Control! Metroid Prime	Retro Studios	Nintendo	2009-02-19^{JP}	February 19, 2009	August 24, 2009 (Note: Released via the Metroid Prime: Trilogy.)	October 15, 2009 (Note: Released via the Metroid Prime: Trilogy.)	September 4, 2009 (Note: Released via the Metroid Prime: Trilogy.)
New Play Control! Metroid Prime 2	Retro Studios	Nintendo	2009-06-11^{JP}	June 11, 2009	August 24, 2009 (Note: Released via the Metroid Prime: Trilogy.)	October 15, 2009 (Note: Released via the Metroid Prime: Trilogy.)	September 4, 2009 (Note: Released via the Metroid Prime: Trilogy.)
Metroid Prime 3: Corruption	Retro Studios	Nintendo	2007-08-27^{NA}	March 6, 2008	August 27, 2007	November 8, 2007	October 26, 2007
MIB: Alien Crisis	Fun Labs	Activision	2012-05-22^{NA}	Unreleased	May 22, 2012	Unreleased	May 25, 2012
Miburi & Teburi	Climax Entertainment	Sega	2008-02-21^{JP}	February 21, 2008	Unreleased	Unreleased	Unreleased
Michael Jackson: The Experience	Ubisoft Montpellier; Ubisoft Paris	Ubisoft	2010-11-23^{NA}	December 8, 2011	November 23, 2010	November 25, 2010	November 26, 2010
MileStone Shooting Collection 2	MileStone Inc.	MileStone Inc.	2010-12-30^{JP}	December 30, 2010	Unreleased	Unreleased	Unreleased
MiniCopter: Adventure Flight; Radio Helicopter^{EU}	Sonic Powered	Arc System Works^{JP} Aksys Games^{NA} 505 Games^{EU}	2007-12-13^{JP}	December 13, 2007	April 11, 2008	Unreleased	June 27, 2008
Mini Desktop Racing	Data Design Interactive	Data Design Interactive^{PAL} Conspiracy Entertainment^{NA}	2007-10-25^{AUS}	Unreleased	December 4, 2007	October 25, 2007	November 23, 2007
Mini Golf Resort	Teyon	Tivola^{NA} Purple Hills^{EU}	2010-09-01^{NA}	Unreleased	September 1, 2010	Unreleased	January 26, 2011
Mini Ninjas	IO Interactive	Eidos Interactive	2009-09-08^{NA}	Unreleased	September 8, 2009	September 24, 2008	September 11, 2009
Minna no Joushiki Ryoku TV	HAL Laboratory	Nintendo	2008-03-06^{JP}	March 6, 2008	Unreleased	Unreleased	Unreleased
Minon: Everyday Hero; Domino Rally^{NA}	Red Entertainment	Success^{JP} Nordcurrent^{PAL} UFO Interactive Games^{NA}	2007-06-21^{JP}	June 21, 2007	August 18, 2009	May 15, 2009	May 15, 2009
Minute to Win It	Smack Down Productions	Zoo Games	2010-11-02^{NA}	Unreleased	November 2, 2010	Unreleased	Unreleased
MLB Power Pros	Power Pros Production	2K Sports^{NA} Konami^{JP}	2007-10-01^{NA}	October 4, 2007	October 1, 2007	Unreleased	Unreleased
MLB Power Pros 2008	Power Pros Production	2K Sports^{NA} Konami^{JP}	2008-07-29^{NA}	October 2, 2008	July 29, 2008	Unreleased	Unreleased
MLB Superstars	Deep Fried Entertainment	2K Sports	2008-11-10^{NA}	Unreleased	November 10, 2008	Unreleased	Unreleased
Mobile Suit Gundam: MS Sensen 0079	BEC	Namco Bandai Games	2007-07-26^{JP}	July 26, 2007	Unreleased	Unreleased	Unreleased
Mom-chan Diet Wii Figureobics by Jung Da-Yeon	Mechanic Arms	IE Institute	2010-12-23^{JP}	December 23, 2010	Unreleased	Unreleased	Unreleased
Momotaro Dentetsu 16: Moving in Hokkaido!	Hudson Soft	Hudson Soft	2007-07-19^{JP}	July 19, 2007	Unreleased	Unreleased	Unreleased
Momotaro Dentetsu 2010: Sengoku Ishin no Hero Daishūgō! No Maki	Hudson Soft	Hudson Soft	2009-11-26^{JP}	November 26, 2009	Unreleased	Unreleased	Unreleased
The Monkey King: The Legend Begins	Starfish SD	Starfish SD^{JP} UFO Interactive Games^{NA}	2007-09-06^{JP}	September 6, 2007	May 30, 2008	Unreleased	Unreleased
Monkey Mischief! Party Time; Monkey Mischief!^{PAL}	Ivolgamus	Activision	2008-11-11^{NA}	Unreleased	November 11, 2008	March 4, 2009	February 13, 2009
Monopoly	EA Bright Light	Electronic Arts	2008-10-20^{NA}	March 19, 2009	October 20, 2008	October 23, 2008	October 24, 2008
Monopoly Streets	EA Salt Lake	Electronic Arts	2010-10-26^{NA}	Unreleased	October 26, 2010	November 4, 2010	November 5, 2010
Monster 4x4: Stunt Racer	Ubisoft Reflections	Ubisoft	2009-10-27^{NA}	Unreleased	October 27, 2009	November 19, 2009	November 20, 2009
Monster 4x4: World Circuit	Ubisoft Barcelona	Ubisoft	2006-11-19^{NA}	December 21, 2006	November 19, 2006	December 7, 2006	December 8, 2006
Monster High: 13 Wishes	Game Machine Studios	Little Orbit	2013-10-29^{NA}	Unreleased	October 29, 2013	November 21, 2013	November 22, 2013
Monster High: Ghoul Spirit	ImaginEngine	THQ	2011-10-25^{NA}	Unreleased	October 25, 2011	November 10, 2011	November 11, 2011
Monster High: New Ghoul in School	Torus Games	Little Orbit	2015-11-17^{NA}	Unreleased	November 17, 2015	Unreleased	November 23, 2015
Monster High: Skultimate Roller Maze	Game Machine Studios	Little Orbit	2012-11-13^{NA}	Unreleased	November 13, 2012	November 15, 2012	November 16, 2012
Monster Hunter G	Capcom Production Studio 1	Capcom	2009-04-23^{JP}	April 23, 2009	Unreleased	Unreleased	Unreleased
Monster Hunter Tri	Capcom Production Studio 1	Capcom	2009-08-01^{JP}	August 1, 2009	April 20, 2010	April 29, 2010	April 23, 2010
Monster Jam	Torus Games	Activision	2007-11-21^{NA}	Unreleased	November 21, 2007	May 28, 2008	May 30, 2008
Monster Jam: Path of Destruction	Virtuos	Activision	2010-11-09^{NA}	Unreleased	November 9, 2010	Unreleased	March 18, 2011
Monster Jam: Urban Assault	Torus Games	Activision	2008-10-28^{NA}	Unreleased	October 28, 2008	March 18, 2009	March 13, 2009
Monster Lab	Backbone Entertainment	Eidos Interactive	2008-11-04^{NA}	Unreleased	November 4, 2008	December 11, 2008	November 28, 2008
Monster Mayhem: Build and Battle	Brain Toys	Crave Entertainment	2009-08-11^{NA}	Unreleased	August 11, 2009	Unreleased	Unreleased
Monsters vs. Aliens	Beenox	Activision	2009-03-24^{NA}	Unreleased	March 24, 2009	March 31, 2009	March 27, 2009
Monster Trucks Mayhem	Team6 Game Studios	Zoo Games	2009-09-15^{NA}	Unreleased	September 15, 2009	Unreleased	Unreleased
Monster Trucks: Ultra Mega Xtreme!!!	Team6 Game Studios	Funbox Media	2012-07-20^{EU}	Unreleased	Unreleased	Unreleased	July 20, 2012
Monster Trux: Arenas	Data Design Interactive	Conspiracy Entertainment^{NA} Data Design Interactive^{PAL}	2007-09-25^{NA}	Unreleased	September 25, 2007	January 17, 2008	October 26, 2007
Monster Trux Offroad	Data Design Interactive	Bold Games^{NA} Data Design Interactive^{PAL}	2007-12-31^{NA}	Unreleased	December 31, 2007	May 15, 2008	March 14, 2008
Mortal Kombat: Armageddon	Just Games Interactive	Midway	2007-05-29^{NA}	Unreleased	May 29, 2007	June 14, 2007	June 15, 2007
Mortimer Beckett and the Secrets of Spooky Manor	Pronto Games	RealNetworks	2008-11-18^{NA}	Unreleased	November 18, 2008	Unreleased	Unreleased
MotoGP '08; MotoGP^{NA}	Milestone S.r.l.	Capcom	2008-10-30^{AUS}	Unreleased	March 24, 2009	October 30, 2008	April 24, 2009
Mountain Sports	Sproing Interactive	Activision	2009-10-27^{NA}	Unreleased	October 27, 2009	Unreleased	October 30, 2009
Mr. Bean's Wacky World	Beyond Reality	Blast! Entertainment^{PAL} Red Wagon Games^{NA}	2009-02-06^{EU}	Unreleased	January 31, 2011	June 25, 2009	February 6, 2009
The Mummy: Tomb of the Dragon Emperor	Eurocom	Vivendi Games	2008-07-22^{NA}	Unreleased	July 22, 2008	August 28, 2008	August 8, 2008
The Munchables	Now Production	Namco Bandai Games	2009-05-26^{NA}	September 3, 2009	May 26, 2009	June 23, 2009	June 19, 2009
Muramasa: The Demon Blade	Vanillaware	Marvelous Entertainment^{JP} Ignition Entertainment^{NA} Rising Star Games^{PAL}	2009-04-09^{JP}	April 9, 2009	September 8, 2009	December 3, 2009	November 27, 2009
Mushroom Men: The Spore Wars	Red Fly Studio	SouthPeak Games	2008-12-02^{NA}	Unreleased	December 2, 2008	May 14, 2009	March 27, 2009
Musiic Party: Rock the House	Independent Arts Software	DTP Entertainment	2009-11-27^{EU}	Unreleased	Unreleased	June 6, 2011	November 27, 2009^{EU} April 29, 2011^{UK}
MX vs. ATV Untamed	Incinerator Studios	THQ	2008-02-18^{NA}	Unreleased	November 18, 2008	March 27, 2008	March 7, 2008
My Animal Centre	Braingame Development	Braingame Publishing	2009-03-13^{EU}	Unreleased	Unreleased	Unreleased	March 13, 2009
My Baby First Steps; My Baby 2: My Baby Grew Up^{EU}	Dancing Dots	SouthPeak Games^{NA} Nobilis^{EU}	2009-11-11^{NA}	Unreleased	November 11, 2009	Unreleased	November 20, 2009
My Ballet Studio; Diva Girls: Diva Ballerina^{EU}	DEL	505 Games	2009-11-17^{NA}	Unreleased	November 17, 2009	Unreleased	April 23, 2010
My Body Coach	Kylotonn	Neko Entertainment	2009-11-20^{PAL}	Unreleased	Unreleased	November 20, 2009	November 20, 2009
My Body Coach 2: Fitness & Dance	Kylotonn	Neko Entertainment	2011-11-02^{EU}	Unreleased	Unreleased	Unreleased	November 2, 2011
My Fitness Coach	Ubisoft	Ubisoft	2008-12-02^{NA}	Unreleased	December 2, 2008	February 12, 2009	January 23, 2009
My First Songs	RingZero Game Studio	Mindscape	2010-10-22^{EU}	Unreleased	Unreleased	Unreleased	October 22, 2010
My French Coach	Sensory Sweep Studios	Ubisoft	2007-11-30^{EU}	Unreleased	Unreleased	Unreleased	November 30, 2007
My Horse Club: On the Trail of the Mysterious Appaloosa	Mimesis Republic	Mindscape	2009-03-26^{PAL}	Unreleased	Unreleased	March 26, 2009	March 26, 2009
My Horse & Me	Woedend! Games	Atari	2007-11-23^{EU}	Unreleased	February 5, 2008	February 22, 2008	November 23, 2007
My Horse & Me 2 My Horse & Me: Riding for Gold^{NA}	Tate Interactive	Atari	2008-10-31^{EU}	Unreleased	April 30, 2009	Unreleased	October 31, 2008
My Personal Golf Trainer	Data Design Interactive	XS Games	2010-09-20^{NA}	Unreleased	September 20, 2010	Unreleased	Unreleased
My Spanish Coach	Sensory Sweep Studios	Ubisoft	2007-11-30^{EU}	Unreleased	Unreleased	Unreleased	November 30, 2007
My Word Coach	Ubisoft Montreal; Ubisoft Quebec	Ubisoft	2007-11-06^{NA}	Unreleased	November 6, 2007	November 22, 2007	November 16, 2007
MySims	EA Redwood Shores	Electronic Arts	2007-09-18^{NA}	September 27, 2007	September 18, 2007	September 20, 2007	September 21, 2007
MySims Agents	EA Redwood Shores	Electronic Arts	2009-09-25^{EU}	October 1, 2009	September 29, 2009	October 5, 2009	September 25, 2009
MySims Kingdom	EA Redwood Shores	Electronic Arts	2008-10-28^{NA}	October 30, 2008	October 28, 2008	November 6, 2008	October 31, 2008
MySims Party	EA Redwood Shores	Electronic Arts	2009-03-10^{NA}	March 12, 2009	March 10, 2009	March 12, 2009	March 13, 2009
MySims Racing	Artificial Mind and Movement	Electronic Arts	2009-06-16^{NA}	June 25, 2009	June 16, 2009	June 18, 2009	June 19, 2009
MySims SkyHeroes	Behaviour Interactive	Electronic Arts	2010-09-28^{NA}	Unreleased	September 28, 2010	Unreleased	October 1, 2010
Mystery Case Files: The Malgrave Incident	Big Fish Games; Sanzaru Games	Nintendo	2011-06-27^{NA}	Unreleased	June 27, 2011	September 22, 2011	September 9, 2011
Myth Makers: Orbs of Doom	Data Design Interactive	Bold Games^{NA} Data Design Interactive^{PAL}	2007-10-26^{NA}	Unreleased	October 26, 2007	May 15, 2008	March 14, 2008
Myth Makers Super Kart GP	Data Design Interactive	Data Design Interactive^{PAL} Conspiracy Entertainment^{NA}	2007-11-08^{AUS}	Unreleased	December 7, 2007	November 8, 2007	December 7, 2007
Myth Makers: Trixie in Toyland	Data Design Interactive	Data Design Interactive^{PAL} Conspiracy Entertainment^{NA}	2008-03-14^{EU}	Unreleased	June 24, 2008	May 1, 2008	March 14, 2008
The Naked Brothers Band: The Videogame	Barking Lizards Technologies	Play THQ	2008-10-17^{EU}	Unreleased	October 20, 2008	Unreleased	October 17, 2008
Namco Museum Megamix	Tose	Namco Bandai Games	2010-11-16^{NA}	Unreleased	November 16, 2010	Unreleased	Unreleased
Namco Museum Remix	Tose	Namco Bandai Games^{NA/JP} Atari Europe^{PAL}	2007-10-23^{NA}	December 6, 2007	October 23, 2007	May 1, 2008	April 18, 2008
Nancy Drew: The White Wolf of Icicle Creek	Her Interactive	Sega	2008-12-02^{NA}	Unreleased	December 2, 2008	Unreleased	Unreleased
Naruto: Clash of Ninja Revolution; Naruto: Clash of Ninja Revolution - European Version^{PAL}	Eighting	Tomy	2007-10-23^{NA}	Unreleased	October 23, 2007	May 8, 2008	March 28, 2008
Naruto: Clash of Ninja Revolution 2 Naruto: Clash of Ninja Revolution 2 - European Version^{EU}	Eighting	Tomy	2008-10-21^{NA}	Unreleased	October 21, 2008	Unreleased	February 13, 2009
Naruto Shippuden: Clash of Ninja Revolution 3 Naruto Shippuden: Clash of Ninja Revolution 3 - European Version^{EU}	Eighting	Tomy	2009-11-17^{NA}	Unreleased	November 17, 2009	Unreleased	April 9, 2010
Naruto Shippuden: Dragon Blade Chronicles	Eighting	Tomy^{NA/JP} 505 Games^{EU}	2009-11-12^{NA}	November 26, 2010	November 12, 2009	Unreleased	November 19, 2010
Naruto Shippūden: Gekitō Ninja Taisen! EX	Eighting	Takara Tomy	2007-02-22^{JP}	February 22, 2007	Unreleased	Unreleased	Unreleased
Naruto Shippūden: Gekitō Ninja Taisen! EX 2	Eighting	Takara Tomy	2007-11-29^{JP}	November 29, 2007	Unreleased	Unreleased	Unreleased
Naruto Shippūden: Gekitō Ninja Taisen! EX 3	Eighting	Takara Tomy	2008-11-27^{JP}	November 27, 2008	Unreleased	Unreleased	Unreleased
Naruto Shippūden: Gekitō Ninja Taisen! Special	Eighting	Takara Tomy	2010-12-02^{JP}	December 2, 2010	Unreleased	Unreleased	Unreleased
NASCAR 2011: The Game	Eutechnyx	Activision	2011-05-24^{NA}	Unreleased	May 24, 2011	Unreleased	Unreleased
NASCAR The Game: Inside Line	Eutechnyx	Activision	2012-11-06^{NA}	Unreleased	November 6, 2012	Unreleased	Unreleased
NASCAR Kart Racing	EA Tiburon North Carolina	EA Sports Freestyle	2009-02-10^{NA}	Unreleased	February 10, 2009	Unreleased	Unreleased
NASCAR Unleashed	Firebrand Games	Activision	2011-11-01^{NA}	Unreleased	November 1, 2011	Unreleased	Unreleased
Nat Geo Quiz! Wild Life; Nat Geo Challenge! Wild Life^{NA}	Gusto Games	Black Bean Games^{PAL} D3 Publisher^{NA}	2010-06-25^{PAL}	Unreleased	November 16, 2010	June 25, 2010	June 25, 2010
National Geographic Challenge!	Gusto Games	Black Bean Games^{EU} UTV Ignition Games^{NA}	2011-04-08^{EU}	Unreleased	November 13, 2011	Unreleased	April 8, 2011
NBA 2K10	Visual Concepts	2K Sports	2009-10-09^{AUS}	Unreleased	November 9, 2009	October 9, 2009	November 27, 2009
NBA 2K11	Visual Concepts	2K Sports	2010-10-05^{N}	Unreleased	October 5, 2010	November 11, 2010	October 8, 2010
NBA 2K12	Visual Concepts	2K Sports	2011-10-04^{NA}	Unreleased	October 4, 2011	October 7, 2011	October 7, 2011
NBA 2K13	Visual Concepts	2K Sports	2012-10-02^{NA}	Unreleased	October 2, 2012	October 5, 2012	October 19, 2012
NBA Jam	EA Canada	EA Sports	2010-10-05^{NA}	Unreleased	October 5, 2010	October 14, 2010	January 20, 2011
NBA Live 08	HB Studios	EA Sports	2007-10-02^{NA}	Unreleased	October 2, 2007	October 25, 2007	October 26, 2007
NBA Live 09 All-Play	HB Studios	EA Sports	2008-10-07^{NA}	Unreleased	October 7, 2008	October 9, 2008	October 10, 2008
NCAA Football 09 All-Play	EA Tiburon; EA Canada	EA Sports	2008-07-15^{NA}	Unreleased	July 15, 2008	Unreleased	Unreleased
NCIS	Ubisoft Shanghai	Ubisoft	2011-10-27^{AUS}	Unreleased	November 1, 2011	October 27, 2011	October 28, 2011
Need for Speed: Carbon	EA Black Box	Electronic Arts	2006-11-19^{NA}	December 21, 2006	November 19, 2006	December 14, 2006	December 8, 2006
Need for Speed: Hot Pursuit	Exient Entertainment	Electronic Arts	2010-11-16^{NA}	December 9, 2010	November 16, 2010	November 18, 2010	November 19, 2010
Need for Speed: Nitro	EA Montreal	Electronic Arts	2009-11-03^{NA}	December 17, 2009	November 3, 2009	November 26, 2009	November 6, 2009
Need for Speed: ProStreet	EA Black Box	Electronic Arts	2007-11-14^{NA}	February 1, 2008	November 14, 2007	November 29, 2007	November 30, 2007
Need for Speed: The Run	Firebrand Games	Electronic Arts	2011-11-15^{NA}	December 8, 2011	November 15, 2011	November 17, 2011	November 18, 2011
Need for Speed: Undercover	Exient Entertainment	Electronic Arts	2008-11-18^{NA}	December 18, 2008	November 18, 2008	November 20, 2008	November 21, 2008
Neighborhood Games; Big Family Games^{PAL}	Jet Black Games	THQ	2009-01-12^{NA}	Unreleased	January 12, 2009	May 21, 2009	May 22, 2009
Neopets Puzzle Adventure	Infinite Interactive	Capcom	2008-11-25^{NA}	Unreleased	November 25, 2008	May 21, 2009	May 22, 2009
Nerf N-Strike	EA Salt Lake	Electronic Arts	2008-10-28^{NA}	Unreleased	October 28, 2008	February 12, 2009	February 20, 2009
Nerf N-Strike Elite	EA Salt Lake	Electronic Arts	2009-10-27^{NA}	Unreleased	October 27, 2009	Unreleased	Unreleased
New Carnival Games	Cat Daddy Games	2K Play	2010-09-21^{NA}	Unreleased	September 21, 2010	October 22, 2010	October 22, 2010
New Super Mario Bros. Wii	Nintendo EAD	Nintendo	2009-11-12^{AUS}	December 3, 2009	November 15, 2009	November 12, 2009	November 20, 2009
New Unou Kids Wii	Mechanic Arms	IE Institute	2008-11-13^{JP}	November 13, 2008	Unreleased	Unreleased	Unreleased
NewU Fitness First: Personal Trainer; My Fitness Coach 2: Exercise & Nutrition^{NA}	Lightning Fish	Black Bean Games^{PAL} Ubisoft^{NA}	2009-09-17^{AUS}	Unreleased	January 5, 2010	September 17, 2009	September 18, 2009
NewU Fitness First Mind Body, Yoga & Pilates Workout	Lightning Fish	Black Bean Games^{PAL} SouthPeak Games^{NA}	2010-03-19^{PAL}	Unreleased	December 13, 2010	March 19, 2010	March 19, 2010
NHK Kōhaku Quiz Gassen	Nintendo EAD	Nintendo	2009-12-17^{JP}	December 17, 2009	Unreleased	Unreleased	Unreleased
NHL 2K9	Visual Concepts	2K Sports	2008-09-10^{NA}	Unreleased	September 10, 2008	Unreleased	November 14, 2008
NHL 2K10	Visual Concepts	2K Sports	2009-09-15^{NA}	Unreleased	September 15, 2009	Unreleased	October 23, 2009
NHL 2K11	Visual Concepts	2K Sports	2010-08-24^{NA}	Unreleased	August 24, 2010	Unreleased	October 8, 2010
NHL Slapshot	EA Canada	EA Sports	2010-09-07^{NA}	Unreleased	September 7, 2010	Unreleased	September 16, 2010
Ni Hao, Kai-Lan: Super Game Day	High Voltage Software	2K Play	2009-10-26^{NA}	Unreleased	October 26, 2009	October 22, 2010	March 18, 2011
Nickelodeon Dance	High Voltage Software	2K Play	2011-11-08^{NA}	Unreleased	November 8, 2011	March 22, 2012	March 30, 2012
Nickelodeon Dance 2	High Voltage Software	2K Play	2012-11-06^{NA}	Unreleased	November 6, 2012	November 23, 2012	December 7, 2012
Nickelodeon Fit	High Voltage Software	2K Play	2010-11-08^{NA}	Unreleased	November 8, 2010	December 16, 2010	February 18, 2011
Nicktoons: Attack of the Toybots	Blue Tongue Entertainment	THQ	2007-10-23^{NA}	December 20, 2007	October 23, 2007	November 17, 2007	November 9, 2007
Nicktoons MLB	High Voltage Software	2K Play	2011-09-13^{NA}	Unreleased	September 13, 2011	Unreleased	Unreleased
Night at the Museum: Battle of the Smithsonian	Pipeworks Software	Majesco	2009-05-13^{NA}	Unreleased	May 13, 2009	Unreleased	May 22, 2009
Nights: Journey of Dreams	Sega Studios USA	Sega	2007-12-13^{JP}	December 13, 2007	December 18, 2007	January 24, 2008	January 25, 2008
Ninjabread Man	Data Design Interactive	Data Design Interactive^{PAL} Conspiracy Entertainment^{NA}	2007-09-21^{EU}	Unreleased	October 3, 2007	September 27, 2007	September 21, 2007
Ninja Captains	Nordcurrent	Nordcurrent	2009-10-16^{PAL}	Unreleased	Unreleased	October 16, 2009	October 16, 2009
Ninja Reflex	Sanzaru Games	Electronic Arts	2008-03-04^{NA}	March 27, 2008	March 4, 2008	May 1, 2008	March 14, 2008
Nitrobike	Left Field Productions	Ubisoft	2008-01-15^{NA}	March 27, 2008	January 15, 2008	February 7, 2008	February 8, 2008
No More Heroes	Grasshopper Manufacture	Marvelous Entertainment^{JP} Ubisoft^{NA} Rising Star Games^{PAL}	2007-12-06^{JP}	December 6, 2007	January 22, 2008	March 20, 2008	March 14, 2008
No More Heroes 2: Desperate Struggle	Grasshopper Manufacture	Ubisoft^{NA} Rising Star Games^{PAL} Marvelous Entertainment^{JP}	2010-01-26^{NA}	October 21, 2010	January 26, 2010	May 25, 2010	May 28, 2010
Nobunaga no Yabō: Kakushin with Power-Up Kit	Koei	Koei	2008-03-06^{JP}	March 6, 2008	Unreleased	Unreleased	Unreleased
Nodame Cantabile: Dream Orchestra	Namco Bandai Games	Namco Bandai Games	2007-12-27^{JP}	December 27, 2007	Unreleased	Unreleased	Unreleased
North American Hunting Extravaganza	Arcade Moon	Destineer^{NA} Zushi Games^{EU} Funbox Media^{AUS}	2008-11-06^{NA}	Unreleased	November 6, 2008	March 2011	November 27, 2009
North American Hunting Extravaganza 2	Games Farm	Destineer^{NA} Funbox Media^{PAL}	2010-10-12^{NA/AUS}	Unreleased	October 12, 2010	October 12, 2010	March 25, 2011
Now! That's What I Call Music: Dance & Sing	Tubby Games	Tubby Games	2011-12-02^{EU}	Unreleased	Unreleased	Unreleased	December 2, 2011
NPPL Championship Paintball 2009; Millennium Series Championship Paintball 2009^{PAL}	Sand Grain Studios	Activision	2008-11-18^{NA}	Unreleased	November 18, 2008	March 11, 2009	March 13, 2009
Nutrition Matters	Devil's Details	505 Games	2009-05-22^{EU}	Unreleased	Unreleased	June 25, 2009	May 22, 2009
Obscure II; Obscure: The Aftermath^{NA}	Hydravision Entertainment	Ignition Entertainment^{NA} Playlogic Entertainment^{PAL}	2008-03-25^{NA}	Unreleased	March 25, 2008	August 27, 2008	August 28, 2008
Ocean Commander	CyberPlanet Interactive	Valcon Games	2009-03-31^{NA}	Unreleased	March 31, 2009	Unreleased	Unreleased
Octomania	Hyper-Devbox Japan	Idea Factory^{JP} Conspiracy Entertainment^{NA}	2007-08-23^{JP}	August 23, 2007	March 25, 2008	Unreleased	Unreleased
Off Road; Ford Racing Off Road^{NA}	Razorworks	Empire Interactive	2008-08-15^{PAL}	Unreleased	September 16, 2008	August 15, 2008	August 15, 2008
Offroad Extreme! Special Edition	Data Design Interactive	Data Design Interactive^{PAL} Conspiracy Entertainment^{NA}	2007-11-08^{AUS}	Unreleased	November 23, 2007	November 8, 2007	November 16, 2007
Offshore Tycoon	CyberPlanet Interactive	Valcon Games	2009-03-31^{NA}	Unreleased	March 31, 2009	Unreleased	Unreleased
Ōgon no Kizuna	Town Factory	Jaleco	2009-05-28^{JP}	May 28, 2009	Unreleased	Unreleased	Unreleased
Ōkami	Ready at Dawn; Tose	Capcom	2008-04-15^{NA}	October 15, 2009	April 15, 2008	June 12, 2008	June 13, 2008
OneChanbara: Bikini Zombie Slayers	Tamsoft	D3 Publisher	2008-02-07^{JP}	February 7, 2008	February 10, 2009	March 27, 2009	February 27, 2009
One Piece: Unlimited Adventure	Ganbarion	Namco Bandai Games	2007-04-26^{JP}	April 26, 2007	January 22, 2008	Unreleased	Unreleased
One Piece: Unlimited Cruise Episode 1 – The Treasure Beneath The Waves	Ganbarion	Namco Bandai Games	2008-09-11^{JP}	September 11, 2008	Unreleased	June 25, 2009	June 19, 2009
One Piece: Unlimited Cruise Episode 2: Awakening of a Hero	Ganbarion	Namco Bandai Games	2009-02-26^{JP}	February 26, 2009	Unreleased	October 1, 2009	September 25, 2009
Once Upon A Time	Visual Impact	Storm City Games	2010-12-09^{NA}	Unreleased	December 9, 2010	Unreleased	Unreleased
Oops! 100 Party Games! Oops! Prank Party^{NA} Party Game Box 100^{JP}	Hudson Soft	Hudson Soft	2010-06-04^{EU}	November 11, 2010	October 8, 2010	Unreleased	June 4, 2010
Open Season	Ubisoft Montreal; Ubisoft Quebec	Ubisoft	2006-11-30^{NA}	Unreleased	November 30, 2006	January 27, 2007	December 22, 2006
Opoona	ArtePiazza	Koei	2007-11-01^{JP}	November 1, 2007	March 25, 2008	September 25, 2008	September 12, 2008
Order Up!	SuperVillain Studios	Zoo Games	2008-07-22^{NA}	Unreleased	July 22, 2008	October 23, 2008	October 24, 2008
The Oregon Trail	DoubleTap Games	Red Wagon Games	2011-12-06^{NA}	Unreleased	December 6, 2011	Unreleased	Unreleased
Osōji Sentai Clean Keeper	Design Factory	Idea Factory	2008-04-24^{JP}	April 24, 2008	Unreleased	Unreleased	Unreleased
Our House: Party!	Budcat Creations	Majesco	2009-09-22^{NA}	Unreleased	September 22, 2009	Unreleased	Unreleased
Overlord: Dark Legend	Climax Action	Codemasters	2009-06-23^{NA}	Unreleased	June 23, 2009	July 3, 2009	June 26, 2009
Oyako de Asobo: Miffy no Omocha Bako	h.a.n.d.	Square Enix	2010-03-18^{JP}	March 18, 2010	Unreleased	Unreleased	Unreleased
Pacific Liberator	Team6 Game Studios	Zoo Games	2009-09-15^{NA}	Unreleased	September 15, 2009	Unreleased	Unreleased
Pac-Man Party	Tose	Namco Bandai Games	2010-11-16^{NA}	December 16, 2010	November 16, 2010	December 2, 2010	November 26, 2010
Pajama Sam: Don't Fear the Dark	Mistic Software	Majesco^{NA} Atari Europe^{PAL}	2008-08-29^{NA}	Unreleased	August 29, 2008	December 5, 2008	December 5, 2008
Pandora's Tower	Ganbarion	Nintendo^{WW} Xseed Games^{NA}	2011-05-26^{JP}	May 26, 2011	April 16, 2013	April 12, 2012	April 13, 2012
Party Pigs: FarmYard Games; Farmyard Party^{EU}	Data Design Interactive	Destineer^{NA} Data Design Interactive^{EU}	2009-05-21^{NA}	Unreleased	May 21, 2009	Unreleased	June 26, 2009
Paws & Claws: Pet Resort; My Pet Hotel^{EU}	Independent Arts Software	DTP Entertainment^{EU} THQ^{NA}	2008-09-26^{EU}	Unreleased	January 5, 2009	Unreleased	September 26, 2008
Paws & Claws: Pet Vet; My Vet Practice^{EU}	Neopica; Sproing Interactive	DTP Entertainment^{EU} THQ^{NA}	2008-11-14^{EU}	Unreleased	August 18, 2009	Unreleased	November 14, 2008
PBR: Out of the Chute	Totally Games	Crave Entertainment	2008-10-28^{NA}	Unreleased	October 28, 2008	Unreleased	Unreleased
PDC World Championship Darts 2008	Mere Mortals	Oxygen Games^{EU} O-Games^{NA}	2008-02-08^{EU}	Unreleased	June 16, 2009	Unreleased	February 8, 2008
PDC World Championship Darts 2009	Rebellion Developments	Oxygen Games	2009-05-29^{EU}	Unreleased	Unreleased	Unreleased	May 29, 2009
PDC World Championship Darts Pro Tour	Rebellion Developments; Redoubt	O-Games	2010-11-26^{EU}	Unreleased	Unreleased	Unreleased	November 26, 2010
Pékin Express: La Route des Dragons	Yullaby	Mindscape	2010-09-24^{EU}	Unreleased	Unreleased	Unreleased	September 24, 2010
Penguins of Madagascar	Torus Games	Little Orbit	2014-11-11^{NA}	Unreleased	November 18, 2014	Unreleased	November 28, 2014
The Penguins of Madagascar: Dr. Blowhole Returns – Again!	Griptonite Games	THQ	2011-09-06^{NA}	Unreleased	September 6, 2011	September 15, 2011	September 16, 2011
Penny Racers Party: Turbo Q Speedway	Barnhouse Effect	Takara Tomy	2008-02-28^{JP}	February 28, 2008	October 7, 2008	Unreleased	Unreleased
Peppa Pig: Fun and Games	Asylum Entertainment	P2 Games	2010-10-22^{PAL}	Unreleased	Unreleased	October 22, 2010	October 22, 2010
Peppa Pig: The Game	Asylum Entertainment	P2 Games	2009-11-27^{PAL}	Unreleased	Unreleased	November 27, 2009	November 27, 2009
Pet Pals: Animal Doctor	Frontline Studios	Legacy Interactive^{NA} JoWooD Productions^{PAL}	2008-11-11^{NA}	Unreleased	November 11, 2008	November 14, 2008	November 14, 2008
Pétanque Master	Mere Mortals	Bigben Interactive	2010-07-23^{EU}	Unreleased	Unreleased	Unreleased	July 23, 2010
Pétanque Pro	Mere Mortals	Bigben Interactive	2009-09-06^{EU}	Unreleased	Unreleased	Unreleased	September 6, 2009
Petz: Catz 2 Catz^{PAL}	Yuke's	Ubisoft	2007-11-14^{NA}	December 20, 2007	November 14, 2007	December 6, 2007	December 7, 2007
Petz: Crazy Monkeyz; Petz: Monkey Madness^{PAL}	Y's K	Ubisoft	2008-11-18^{NA}	Unreleased	November 18, 2008	December 11, 2008	February 13, 2009
Petz: Dogz 2 Dogz^{PAL}	Yuke's	Ubisoft	2007-11-14^{NA}	December 20, 2007	November 14, 2007	December 6, 2007	December 7, 2007
Petz: Horse Club; Imagine Champion Rider^{PAL}	Phoenix Interactive	Ubisoft	2008-10-28^{NA}	Unreleased	October 28, 2008	November 6, 2008	November 7, 2008
Petz: Horsez 2 Pippa Funnell: Ranch Rescue^{EU} Horsez: Ranch Rescue^{AUS}	Phoenix Interactive	Ubisoft	2007-11-14^{NA}	Unreleased	November 14, 2007	November 22, 2007	November 16, 2007
Petz Rescue: Wildlife Vet; Planet Rescue: Wildlife Vet^{PAL}	Virtual Toys	Ubisoft	2008-10-21^{NA}	Unreleased	October 21, 2008	November 13, 2008	November 28, 2008
Petz Sports: Dog Playground	Ubisoft Montreal	Ubisoft	2008-11-04^{NA}	Unreleased	November 4, 2008	November 27, 2008	November 13, 2008
Phantom Brave: We Meet Again	System Prisma	Nippon Ichi Software^{JP} NIS America^{NA}	2009-03-12^{JP}	March 12, 2009	August 14, 2009	Unreleased	Unreleased
Pheasants Forever: Wingshooter	High Voltage Software	GameMill Entertainment	2010-10-06^{NA}	Unreleased	October 6, 2010	Unreleased	Unreleased
Phineas and Ferb: Across the 2nd Dimension	High Impact Games	Disney Interactive Studios	2011-08-02^{NA}	Unreleased	August 2, 2011	September 15, 2011	September 16, 2011
Phineas and Ferb: Quest for Cool Stuff	Behaviour Interactive	Majesco^{NA} 505 Games^{EU}	2013-08-13^{NA}	Unreleased	August 13, 2013	Unreleased	March 7, 2014
Pictionary	Page 44 Studios	THQ	2010-11-14^{NA}	Unreleased	November 14, 2010	February 24, 2011	March 4, 2011
New Play Control! Pikmin	Nintendo EAD	Nintendo	2008-12-25^{JP}	December 25, 2008	March 9, 2009	February 26, 2009	February 6, 2009
New Play Control! Pikmin 2	Nintendo EAD	Nintendo	2009-03-12^{JP}	March 12, 2009	June 10, 2012	May 14, 2009	April 24, 2009
Pimp My Ride	Eutechnyx	Activision	2008-02-19^{NA}	Unreleased	February 19, 2008	October 1, 2008	September 12, 2008
Pinball Hall of Fame: The Gottlieb Collection; Gottlieb Pinball Classics^{PAL}	FarSight Studios	System 3^{PAL} Crave Entertainment^{NA}	2006-12-08^{EU}	Unreleased	January 19, 2010	January 11, 2007	December 8, 2006
Pinball Hall of Fame: The Williams Collection; Williams Pinball Classics^{PAL}	FarSight Studios	Crave Entertainment^{NA} System 3^{PAL}	2008-02-26^{NA}	Unreleased	February 26, 2008	November 24, 2011	November 25, 2011
Pirate Blast	Big Ant Studios	Zoo Games	2011-02-15^{NA}	Unreleased	February 15, 2011	Unreleased	Unreleased
Pirates: Hunt for Blackbeard's Booty	Mad Monkey Studio	Activision	2008-10-28^{NA}	Unreleased	October 28, 2008	March 4, 2009	February 13, 2009
Pirates of the Caribbean: At World's End	Eurocom	Disney Interactive Studios	2007-05-22^{NA}	June 7, 2007	May 22, 2007	May 24, 2007	May 25, 2007
Pirates Plund-Arrr	Boomzap Entertainment	Majesco	2010-05-25^{NA}	Unreleased	May 25, 2010	Unreleased	Unreleased
Pirates vs. Ninjas Dodgeball	Blazing Lizard	SouthPeak Games	2009-05-14^{NA}	Unreleased	May 14, 2009	September 24, 2009	June 12, 2009
Pitfall: The Big Adventure	Edge of Reality	Activision	2008-10-07^{NA}	Unreleased	October 7, 2008	March 4, 2009	February 13, 2009
Pizza Delivery Boy	Attractive Games	Majesco	2010-03-18^{NA}	Unreleased	March 18, 2010	Unreleased	Unreleased
Planes	Behaviour Interactive	Disney Interactive Studios	2013-08-06^{NA}	Unreleased	August 6, 2013	September 5, 2013	August 16, 2013
Planes: Fire & Rescue	Game Machine Studios	Little Orbit	2014-11-04^{NA}	Unreleased	November 4, 2014	November 6, 2014	November 7, 2014
Planet 51: The Game	Pyro Studios	Sega	2009-11-17^{NA}	Unreleased	November 17, 2009	November 26, 2009	November 27, 2009
Planet Basket 2009/2010	Idoru	Double Jungle	2010-08-27^{EU}	Unreleased	Unreleased	Unreleased	August 27, 2010
Playmobil Circus	Morgen Studios	DreamCatcher Interactive^{NA} HMH Interactive^{PAL}	2009-12-21^{NA}	Unreleased	December 21, 2009	June 11, 2010	June 11, 2010
Pocoyo Racing	Zinkia Entertainment	Zinkia Entertainment	2011-11-18^{EU}	Unreleased	Unreleased	Unreleased	November 18, 2011
Pokémon Battle Revolution	Genius Sonority	The Pokémon Company^{JP} Nintendo^{WW}	2006-12-14^{JP}	December 14, 2006	June 25, 2007	November 22, 2007	December 7, 2007
PokéPark Wii: Pikachu's Adventure	Creatures Inc.	The Pokémon Company^{JP} Nintendo^{WW}	2009-12-05^{JP}	December 5, 2009	November 1, 2010	September 23, 2010	July 9, 2010
PokéPark 2: Wonders Beyond	Creatures Inc.	The Pokémon Company^{JP} Nintendo^{WW}	2011-11-12^{JP}	November 12, 2011	February 27, 2012	March 29, 2012	March 23, 2012
Pony Friends 2	Tantalus Media	Eidos Interactive^{PAL} Square Enix^{NA}	2009-11-20^{PAL}	Unreleased	February 23, 2010	November 20, 2009	November 20, 2009
Pool Hall Pro	Icon Games Entertainment	Playlogic Entertainment	2009-06-09^{EU/NA}	Unreleased	June 9, 2009	Unreleased	June 9, 2009
Pool Party	Hyper-Devbox Japan	SouthPeak Games	2007-09-05^{NA}	Unreleased	September 5, 2007	August 7, 2008	July 18, 2008
Pop'n Music; Pop'n Rhythm^{EU}	Konami	Konami	2009-08-06^{JP}	August 6, 2009	November 13, 2009	Unreleased	February 11, 2010
PopStar Guitar	Broadsword Interactive	XS Games	2008-10-28^{NA}	Unreleased	October 28, 2008	November 27, 2008	November 28, 2008
Popstars	Independent Arts Software	SevenOne Intermedia	2010-09-17^{EU}	Unreleased	Unreleased	Unreleased	September 17, 2010
Power Punch	Grand Prix Inc.	XS Games	2010-02-23^{NA}	Unreleased	February 23, 2010	Unreleased	Unreleased
Power Rangers Samurai	Inti Creates	Namco Bandai Games	2011-11-22^{NA}	Unreleased	November 22, 2011	December 1, 2011	December 2, 2011
PreCure All Stars: Everyone Gather Let's Dance!	Namco Bandai Games	Namco Bandai Games	2013-03-28^{JP}	March 28, 2013	Unreleased	Unreleased	Unreleased
Press Your Luck: 2010 Edition	Ludia	Ubisoft	2009-10-27^{NA}	Unreleased	October 27, 2009	Unreleased	Unreleased
The Price Is Right	Ludia	Ubisoft	2008-09-09^{NA}	Unreleased	September 9, 2008	Unreleased	Unreleased
The Price is Right: 2010 Edition	Ludia	Ubisoft	2009-09-22^{NA}	Unreleased	September 22, 2009	Unreleased	Unreleased
The Price Is Right: Decades	Ludia	Ubisoft	2011-10-18^{NA}	Unreleased	October 18, 2011	Unreleased	Unreleased
Prince of Persia: The Forgotten Sands	Ubisoft Quebec	Ubisoft	2010-05-18^{NA}	Unreleased	May 18, 2010	May 20, 2010	May 20, 2010^{EU} May 21, 2010^{UK}
Prince of Persia: Rival Swords	Ubisoft Montreal; Ubisoft Casablanca	Ubisoft	2007-04-03^{NA}	Unreleased	April 3, 2007	April 5, 2007	April 5, 2007
The Princess and the Frog	Griptonite Games	Disney Interactive Studios	2009-11-17^{NA}	Unreleased	November 17, 2009	November 25, 2009	February 5, 2010
Princess Isabella: A Witch's Curse	Gogii Games	Destineer	2010-09-03^{NA}	Unreleased	September 3, 2010	Unreleased	Unreleased
Prinzessin Lillifee: Der große Feenball	The Web Production	Tivola	2010-08-12^{EU}	Unreleased	Unreleased	Unreleased	August 12, 2010
Pro Evolution Soccer 2008	Konami	Konami	2008-02-21^{JP}	February 21, 2008	March 18, 2008	April 17, 2008	March 28, 2008
Pro Evolution Soccer 2009	Konami	Konami	2009-03-17^{NA}	May 14, 2009	March 17, 2009	April 2, 2009	March 27, 2009
Pro Evolution Soccer 2010	Konami	Konami	2009-11-10^{NA}	December 10, 2009	November 10, 2009	November 26, 2009	November 20, 2009
Pro Evolution Soccer 2011	Konami	Konami	2010-10-29^{EU}	November 18, 2010	November 23, 2010	November 8, 2010	October 29, 2010
Pro Evolution Soccer 2012	Konami	Konami	2011-11-03^{JP}	November 3, 2011	November 15, 2011	Unreleased	November 4, 2011
Pro Evolution Soccer 2013	Konami	Konami	2012-11-01^{JP}	November 1, 2012	November 6, 2012	Unreleased	November 9, 2012
Pro Golfer Saru	Eighting	Namco Bandai Games	2008-10-23^{JP}	October 23, 2008	Unreleased	Unreleased	Unreleased
Pro Yakyū: Family Stadium	Namco Bandai Games	Namco Bandai Games	2008-05-01^{JP}	May 1, 2008	Unreleased	Unreleased	Unreleased
Professor Heinz Wolff's Gravity	Extra Mile Studios	Deep Silver	2008-11-28^{PAL}	Unreleased	April 6, 2009	November 28, 2008	November 28, 2008
Project Runway	Tornado Studios	Atari Interactive	2010-03-02^{NA}	Unreleased	March 2, 2010	June 17, 2010	June 18, 2010
Project Zero 2: Wii Edition	Tecmo Koei Games	Nintendo	2012-06-28^{JP/AUS}	June 28, 2012	Unreleased	June 28, 2012	June 29, 2012
PSA World Tour Squash 2015	Team6 Game Studios	Alternative Software	2015-05-22^{EU}	Unreleased	Unreleased	Unreleased	May 22, 2015
Pucca's Race for Kisses	Otaboo	Bigben Interactive	2011-02-14^{EU}	Unreleased	Unreleased (Note: Released via WiiWare as Pucca's Kisses Game.)	Unreleased (Note: Released via WiiWare as Pucca's Kisses Game.)	February 14, 2011 (Note: Date shown is for disc version.)
Punch-Out!!	Next Level Games	Nintendo	2009-05-18^{NA}	July 23, 2009	May 18, 2009	August 27, 2009	May 22, 2009
Puppy Luv	Blue Monkey Studios	Activision	2007-10-23^{NA}	Unreleased	October 23, 2007	Unreleased	April 25, 2008
Purr Pals	Brain Toys	Crave Entertainment^{NA} Deep Silver^{EU}	2008-07-10^{NA}	Unreleased	July 10, 2008	Unreleased	July 17, 2009
Puss in Boots	Blitz Games	THQ	2011-10-25^{NA}	Unreleased	October 25, 2011	December 1, 2011	December 2, 2011
Puyo Puyo! 15th Anniversary	Sonic Team	Sega	2007-07-26^{JP}	July 26, 2007	Unreleased	Unreleased	Unreleased
Puyo Puyo!! 20th Anniversary	Sonic Team; O-TWO inc.	Sega	2011-12-15^{JP}	December 15, 2011	Unreleased	Unreleased	Unreleased
Puyo Puyo 7	Sonic Team; h.a.n.d.	Sega	2009-11-26^{JP}	November 26, 2009	Unreleased	Unreleased	Unreleased
Puzzle Challenge: Crosswords and More!	Supersonic Software	Crave Entertainment	2009-02-28^{NA}	Unreleased	February 28, 2009	Unreleased	Unreleased
Puzzle Kingdoms	Infinite Interactive	Zoo Games^{NA} Zushi Games^{PAL}	2009-05-13^{NA}	Unreleased	May 13, 2009	July 31, 2009	July 31, 2009
Puzzle Quest: Challenge of the Warlords	Infinite Interactive	D3 Publisher	2007-11-30^{NA}	Unreleased	November 30, 2007	March 27, 2008	February 8, 2008
Puzzle Series Vol. 1: Sudoku	Hudson Soft	Hudson Soft	2007-03-21^{NA}	March 21, 2007	Unreleased	Unreleased	Unreleased
Puzzle Series Vol.2 Illustlogic + Colorful Logic	Hudson Soft	Hudson Soft	2008-07-10^{JP}	July 10, 2008	Unreleased	Unreleased	Unreleased
Puzzler Collection	Route 1 Games	Zoo Games^{NA} Ubisoft^{PAL}	2008-07-29^{NA}	Unreleased	July 29, 2008	October 23, 2008	October 17, 2008
Quiz Party	Wizarbox	CK Games	2012-07-27^{EU}	Unreleased	Unreleased	Unreleased	July 27, 2012
Questions pour un Champion	Sanuk Games	Mindscape	2009-11-06^{EU}	Unreleased	Unreleased	Unreleased	November 6, 2009
Rabbids Go Home	Ubisoft Montpellier	Ubisoft	2009-11-03^{NA}	November 26, 2009	November 3, 2009	November 5, 2009	November 6, 2009
Racket Sports Party; Racquet Sports^{NA}	Asobo Studio	Ubisoft	2010-03-09^{NA}	Unreleased	March 9, 2010	March 25, 2010	March 26, 2010
Radirgy Noa Wii	MileStone Inc.	MileStone Inc.	2010-02-25^{JP}	February 25, 2010	Unreleased	Unreleased	Unreleased
Ram Racing	Visual Impact	Storm City Games^{NA} Enjoy Gaming^{PAL}	2011-10-12^{NA}	Unreleased	October 12, 2011	April 22, 2012	April 22, 2012
Rampage: Total Destruction	Pipeworks Software	Midway	2006-11-19^{NA}	Unreleased	November 19, 2006	February 8, 2007	February 9, 2007
Rango	Behaviour Interactive	Electronic Arts	2011-02-25^{EU}	Unreleased	March 1, 2011	March 3, 2011	February 25, 2011
Rapala Fishing Frenzy	Magic Wand Productions	Activision	2008-09-02^{NA}	Unreleased	September 2, 2008	December 3, 2008	October 17, 2008
Rapala Pro Bass Fishing	Fun Labs	Activision	2010-09-28^{NA}	Unreleased	September 28, 2010	January 27, 2011	October 29, 2010
Rapala Tournament Fishing	Magic Wand Productions	Activision	2006-11-22^{NA}	Unreleased	November 22, 2006	March 21, 2007	March 16, 2007
Rapala: We Fish	Polygon Magic	Activision	2009-09-29^{NA}	Unreleased	September 29, 2009	Unreleased	November 13, 2009
Ratatouille	Asobo Studio	THQ	2007-06-26^{NA}	August 2, 2007	June 26, 2007	August 9, 2007	September 28, 2007
Raving Rabbids: Travel in Time	Ubisoft Paris	Ubisoft	2010-11-21^{NA}	January 27, 2011	November 21, 2010	November 25, 2010	November 26, 2010
Rayman Origins	Ubisoft Montpellier; Ubisoft Paris; Ubisoft Casablanca	Ubisoft	2011-11-15^{NA}	Unreleased	November 15, 2011	November 24, 2011	November 25, 2011
Rayman Raving Rabbids	Ubisoft Montpellier	Ubisoft	2006-11-19^{NA}	December 14, 2006	November 19, 2006	December 7, 2006	December 8, 2006
Rayman Raving Rabbids 2	Ubisoft Paris	Ubisoft	2007-11-13^{NA}	December 6, 2007	November 13, 2007	November 15, 2007	November 16, 2007
Rayman Raving Rabbids: TV Party	Ubisoft Paris	Ubisoft	2008-11-13^{AUS}	January 22, 2009	November 18, 2008	November 13, 2008	November 14, 2008
Reader Rabbit 1st Grade	The Learning Company	Graffiti Entertainment^{NA} Nordic Softsales^{EU}	2011-05-17^{NA}	Unreleased	May 17, 2011	Unreleased	December 2, 2011
Reader Rabbit 2nd Grade	The Learning Company	Graffiti Entertainment^{NA} Nordic Softsales^{EU}	2011-05-17^{NA}	Unreleased	May 17, 2011	Unreleased	December 2, 2011
Reader Rabbit Kindergarten	The Learning Company	Graffiti Entertainment^{NA} Nordic Softsales^{EU}	2011-05-17^{NA}	Unreleased	May 17, 2011	Unreleased	December 2, 2011
Reader Rabbit Preschool	The Learning Company	Graffiti Entertainment^{NA} Nordic Softsales^{EU}	2011-05-17^{NA}	Unreleased	May 17, 2011	Unreleased	December 2, 2011
Ready 2 Rumble: Revolution	AKI Corporation USA	Atari	2009-03-17^{NA}	Unreleased	March 17, 2009	March 26, 2009	March 20, 2009
Ready Steady Cook	Sanuk Games	Mindscape	2009-08-14^{EU}	Unreleased	Unreleased	September 10, 2009	August 14, 2009
Real Heroes: Firefighter	Epicenter Studios	Conspiracy Entertainment^{NA} Rondomedia^{EU}	2009-08-04^{NA}	Unreleased	August 4, 2009	Unreleased	September 24, 2010
Real Madrid: The Game	Atomic Planet Entertainment	Virgin Play	2009-04-03^{EU}	Unreleased	Unreleased	Unreleased	April 3, 2009
Real Stories Vétérinaire	DehonGames	Mindscape	2008-11-19^{EU}	Unreleased	Unreleased	Unreleased	November 19, 2008
Rebel Raiders: Operation Nighthawk	Kando Games	XS Games^{NA} Kando Games^{EU}	2008-09-23^{NA}	Unreleased	September 23, 2008	Unreleased	October 23, 2008
Rec Room Games; Great Party Games^{PAL}	Arcade Moon	Destineer^{NA} OG International^{PAL}	2009-12-07^{NA}	Unreleased	December 7, 2009	June 11, 2010	June 11, 2010
Red Steel	Ubisoft Paris	Ubisoft	2006-11-19^{NA}	December 2, 2006	November 19, 2006	December 7, 2006	December 8, 2006
Red Steel 2	Ubisoft Paris	Ubisoft	2010-03-23^{NA}	May 27, 2010	March 23, 2010	March 25, 2010	March 26, 2010
Reel Fishing: Angler's Dream	Marvelous Entertainment	Marvelous Entertainment^{JP} Natsume Inc.^{NA} Funbox Media^{PAL}	2009-04-30^{JP}	April 30, 2009	August 31, 2009	September 30, 2010	February 12, 2010
Reload	Mastiff	Mastiff^{NA} N3V Games^{AUS}	2010-11-18^{NA}	Unreleased	November 18, 2010	May 26, 2011	Unreleased
Remington Great American Bird Hunt	Kouyousha	Mastiff^{NA} Neko Entertainment^{EU}	2009-11-02^{NA}	Unreleased	November 2, 2009	Unreleased	November 20, 2010
Remington Super Slam Hunting: Africa	eV Interactive	Mastiff^{NA} N3V Games^{AUS}	2010-11-17^{NA}	Unreleased	November 17, 2010	June 16, 2011	Unreleased
Remington Super Slam Hunting: Alaska	eV Interactive	Mastiff	2011-05-03^{NA}	Unreleased	May 3, 2011	Unreleased	Unreleased
Remington Super Slam Hunting: North America	eV Interactive	Mastiff^{NA} N3V Games^{AUS}	2010-11-15^{NA}	Unreleased	November 15, 2010	June 16, 2011	Unreleased
Retro City Rampage DX+	Vblank Entertainment	Vblank Entertainment	2020-07-09^{EU}	Unreleased	Unreleased	Unreleased	July 9, 2020
Resident Evil 4: Wii Edition	Capcom Production Studio 4	Capcom	2007-05-31^{JP}	May 31, 2007	June 19, 2007	July 5, 2007	June 29, 2007
Resident Evil Archives: Resident Evil	Capcom Production Studio 4	Capcom	2008-12-25^{JP}	December 25, 2008	June 23, 2009	June 25, 2009	June 26, 2009
Resident Evil Archives: Resident Evil Zero	Capcom Production Studio 3; Tose	Capcom	2008-07-10^{JP}	July 10, 2008	December 1, 2009	January 21, 2010	January 22, 2010
Resident Evil: The Darkside Chronicles	Capcom; Cavia	Capcom	2009-11-17^{NA}	January 14, 2010	November 17, 2009	November 26, 2009	November 27, 2009
Resident Evil: The Umbrella Chronicles	Capcom; Cavia	Capcom	2007-11-13^{NA}	November 15, 2007	November 13, 2007	December 13, 2007	November 30, 2007
Rhythm Heaven Fever; Beat the Beat: Rhythm Paradise^{PAL}	Nintendo SPD; TNX Music Recordings	Nintendo	2011-07-21^{JP}	July 21, 2011	February 13, 2012	September 13, 2012	July 6, 2012
Rig Racer 2	Data Design Interactive	Bold Games^{NA} Data Design Interactive^{PAL}	2007-12-31^{NA}	Unreleased	December 31, 2007	May 1, 2008	March 14, 2008
Rilakkuma Minna de Goyururi Seikatsu	MTO	MTO	2009-03-05^{JP}	March 5, 2009	Unreleased	Unreleased	Unreleased
Ringling Bros. and Barnum & Bailey Circus; It's My Circus^{PAL}	Cat Daddy Games	2K Play	2009-11-10^{NA}	Unreleased	November 10, 2009	March 19, 2010	March 19, 2010
Rio	Eurocom	THQ	2011-04-07^{AUS}	Unreleased	April 12, 2011	April 7, 2011	April 8, 2011
Rise of the Guardians: The Video Game	Torus Games	D3 Publisher	2012-11-20^{NA}	Unreleased	November 20, 2012	November 29, 2012	November 23, 2012
Rock Band	Pi Studios	MTV Games	2008-06-22^{NA}	Unreleased	June 22, 2008	November 7, 2008	September 12, 2008
Rock Band 2	Pi Studios	MTV Games	2008-12-18^{NA}	Unreleased	December 18, 2008	Unreleased	October 9, 2009
Rock Band 3	Backbone Entertainment	MTV Games	2010-10-26^{NA}	Unreleased	October 26, 2010	October 28, 2010	October 29, 2010
Rock Band Country Track Pack	Harmonix; Demiurge Studios	MTV Games	2009-07-21^{NA}	Unreleased	July 21, 2009	Unreleased	Unreleased
Rock Band Country Track Pack 2	Harmonix; Demiurge Studios	MTV Games	2011-02-01^{NA}	Unreleased	February 1, 2011	Unreleased	Unreleased
Rock Band Metal Track Pack	Harmonix; Demiurge Studios	MTV Games	2009-09-22^{NA}	Unreleased	September 22, 2009	Unreleased	Unreleased
Rock Band Track Pack Classic Rock	Harmonix	MTV Games	2009-05-19^{NA}	Unreleased	May 19, 2009	Unreleased	Unreleased
Rock Band Track Pack Volume 1 Rock Band Song Pack 1^{PAL}	Harmonix; Pi Studios	MTV Games	2008-07-15^{NA}	Unreleased	July 15, 2008	November 7, 2008	September 26, 2008
Rock Band Track Pack Volume 2 Rock Band Song Pack 2^{EU}	Harmonix; Pi Studios	MTV Games	2008-11-18^{NA}	Unreleased	November 18, 2008	Unreleased	April 19, 2009
Rock Blast	CyberPlanet Interactive	UFO Interactive Games	2010-02-09^{NA}	Unreleased	February 9, 2010	Unreleased	Unreleased
Rock Revolution	Zoë Mode; HB Studios	Konami	2008-11-11^{NA}	Unreleased	November 11, 2008	Unreleased	Unreleased
Rock 'n' Roll Adventures	Data Design Interactive	Data Design Interactive^{PAL} Conspiracy Entertainment^{NA}	2007-09-17^{EU}	Unreleased	October 11, 2007	September 27, 2007	September 17, 2007
Rockstar Games Presents Table Tennis	Rockstar Leeds	Rockstar Games^{WW} Spike^{JP}	2007-10-16^{NA}	April 16, 2009	October 16, 2007	October 19, 2007	October 19, 2007
Rodea the Sky Soldier	Prope	Kadokawa Games^{JP} NIS America^{WW}	2015-04-02^{JP}	April 2, 2015	November 10, 2015	November 19, 2015	November 13, 2015
Rogue Trooper: Quartz Zone Massacre	Rebellion Developments	Reef Entertainment^{EU} Graffiti Entertainment^{NA}	2009-02-20^{EU}	Unreleased	December 4, 2009	Unreleased	February 20, 2009
Roogoo: Twisted Towers	SpiderMonk Entertainment	SouthPeak Games	2009-06-30^{NA}	Unreleased	June 30, 2009	Unreleased	Unreleased
Rooms: The Main Building	HandMade Game	Hudson Soft	2010-03-23^{NA}	April 29, 2010	March 23, 2010	Unreleased	Unreleased
RTL Biathlon 2009	49Games	RTL Sports	2008-11-27^{EU}	Unreleased	Unreleased	Unreleased	November 27, 2008
Rubik's Puzzle World; Rubik's World^{NA}	Two Tribes	The Game Factory	2008-11-04^{NA}	Unreleased	November 4, 2008	November 27, 2008	November 21, 2008
Rudolph the Red-Nosed Reindeer	High Voltage Software	Red Wagon Games	2010-11-11^{NA}	Unreleased	November 11, 2010	Unreleased	Unreleased
Rugby League 3	Sidhe Interactive	Tru Blu Entertainment	2010-03-18^{PAL}	Unreleased	Unreleased	March 18, 2010	March 18, 2010
Runaway: The Dream of the Turtle	Pendulo Studios	Focus Home Interactive	2009-11-26^{EU}	Unreleased	Unreleased	Unreleased	November 26, 2009
Rune Factory Frontier	Neverland	Marvelous Entertainment^{JP} Xseed Games^{NA} Rising Star Games^{EU}	2008-11-27^{JP}	November 27, 2008	March 17, 2009	Unreleased	April 1, 2010
Rune Factory: Tides of Destiny	Neverland	Marvelous Entertainment^{JP} Natsume Inc.^{NA}	2011-02-24^{JP}	February 24, 2011	October 7, 2011	Unreleased	Unreleased
Rygar: The Battle of Argus	Team Tachyon	Tecmo^{JP/NA} Rising Star Games^{EU}	2008-12-11^{JP}	December 11, 2008	February 3, 2009	Unreleased	July 3, 2009
The Saddle Club; Grand Galop^{EU} I Love Horses: Rider's Paradise^{NA}	Tate Interactive	Deep Silver^{PAL} Destineer^{NA}	2010-06-30^{AUS}	Unreleased	March 30, 2011	June 30, 2010	August 27, 2010
Safari Adventures Africa	ElektroGames	Conspiracy Entertainment^{NA} Neko Entertainment^{EU}	2009-10-27^{NA/EU}	Unreleased	October 27, 2009	Unreleased	October 27, 2009
Safecracker	Kheops Studio	The Adventure Company	2008-12-03^{NA}	Unreleased	December 3, 2008	January 23, 2009	January 23, 2009
Saint	Opera House	UFO Interactive Games^{NA} Starfish SD^{JP}	2009-07-21^{NA}	August 27, 2009	July 21, 2009	Unreleased	Unreleased
Sakura Wars: So Long, My Love	Idea Factory	NIS America	2010-03-30^{NA}	Unreleased	March 30, 2010	Unreleased	April 9, 2010
Sam & Max Beyond Time and Space	Telltale Games	Atari	2010-03-16^{NA}	Unreleased	March 16, 2010	December 1, 2010	September 30, 2010
Sam & Max: Season One	Telltale Games	The Adventure Company	2008-10-14^{NA}	Unreleased	October 14, 2008	February 12, 2009	November 28, 2008
Samba de Amigo	Gearbox Software; Escalation Studios	Sega	2008-09-23^{NA}	December 11, 2008	September 23, 2008	October 2, 2008	September 26, 2008
Samurai Shodown Anthology	Terminal Reality	SNK Playmore	2008-07-24^{JP}	July 24, 2008	April 14, 2009	Unreleased	March 27, 2009
Samurai Warriors 3	Omega Force; Nintendo EAD	Tecmo Koei^{JP} Nintendo^{WW}	2009-12-03^{JP}	December 3, 2009	September 28, 2010	June 10, 2010	May 28, 2010
Samurai Warriors: Katana	Omega Force	Koei	2007-09-20^{JP}	September 20, 2007	January 15, 2008	February 28, 2008	February 22, 2008
Sangokushi 11 with Power-Up Kit	Koei	Koei	2007-03-21^{JP}	March 21, 2007	Unreleased	Unreleased	Unreleased
Santa Claus is Comin' to Town!	1st Playable Productions	Red Wagon Games	2011-11-08^{NA}	Unreleased	November 8, 2011	Unreleased	Unreleased
Satisfashion	TechFront	Destineer	2010-06-08^{NA}	Unreleased	June 8, 2010	Unreleased	Unreleased
Scarface: The World Is Yours	Radical Entertainment	Vivendi Games	2007-06-12^{NA}	Unreleased	June 12, 2007	July 19, 2007	July 6, 2007
Scene It? Bright Lights! Big Screen!	Artificial Mind and Movement	Warner Bros. Interactive Entertainment	2009-11-17^{NA}	Unreleased	November 17, 2009	December 3, 2009	December 4, 2009
Scene It? Twilight	Screenlife Games	Konami	2009-11-24^{NA}	Unreleased	November 24, 2009	June 3, 2010	March 19, 2010
Schlag den Raab	spielkind UG	bitComposer Games	2010-09-10^{EU}	Unreleased	Unreleased	Unreleased	September 10, 2010
Schlag den Raab: Das 2. Spiel	Sproing Interactive	bitComposer Games	2011-10-19^{EU}	Unreleased	Unreleased	Unreleased	October 19, 2011
Schlag den Raab: Das 3. Spiel	Sproing Interactive	bitComposer Entertainment	2012-09-11^{EU}	Unreleased	Unreleased	Unreleased	September 11, 2012
Science Papa	Mad Monkey Studio	Activision	2009-07-15^{NA}	Unreleased	July 15, 2009	October 30, 2009	October 30, 2009
Scooby-Doo! and the Spooky Swamp	Torus Games	Warner Bros. Interactive Entertainment	2010-09-14^{NA}	Unreleased	September 14, 2010	September 29, 2010	October 15, 2010
Scooby-Doo! First Frights	Torus Games	Warner Bros. Interactive Entertainment	2009-09-22^{NA}	Unreleased	September 22, 2009	October 9, 2009	October 9, 2009
SCORE International Baja 1000; SCORE International Baja 1000: World Championship Off Road Racing^{EU}	Left Field Productions	Activision	2008-10-28^{NA}	Unreleased	October 28, 2008	Unreleased	November 21, 2008
Scrabble Interactive	Wizarbox	Ubisoft	2009-09-24^{AUS}	Unreleased	Unreleased	September 24, 2009	October 1, 2009
SD Gundam G Generation Wars	Tom Create	Namco Bandai Games	2009-08-06^{JP}	August 6, 2009	Unreleased	Unreleased	Unreleased
SD Gundam G Generation World	Tom Create	Namco Bandai Games	2011-02-24^{JP}	February 24, 2011	Unreleased	Unreleased	Unreleased
SD Gundam: Gashapon Wars	BEC	Namco Bandai Games	2010-06-24^{JP}	June 24, 2010	Unreleased	Unreleased	Unreleased
SD Gundam: Scad Hammers	BEC	Namco Bandai Games	2006-12-02^{JP}	December 2, 2006	Unreleased	Unreleased	Unreleased
Sea Monsters: A Prehistoric Adventure	Atomic Planet Entertainment	DSI Games^{NA} Zoo Digital Publishing^{PAL}	2007-12-27^{NA}	Unreleased	December 27, 2007	February 8, 2008	February 8, 2008
Secret Files 2: Puritas Cordis	Keen Games	Deep Silver	2009-05-08^{EU}	Unreleased	Unreleased	October 14, 2009	May 8, 2009
Secret Files: Tunguska	Keen Games	Deep Silver	2008-04-25^{GER}	Unreleased	June 22, 2010	Unreleased	April 25, 2008^{GER} May 23, 2008^{EU}
The Secret Saturdays: Beasts of the 5th Sun	High Voltage Software	D3 Publisher	2009-10-20^{NA}	Unreleased	October 20, 2009	April 12, 2010	November 20, 2009
Sega Bass Fishing	Cavia	Sega	2008-02-26^{NA}	February 28, 2008	February 26, 2008	March 27, 2008	March 28, 2008
Sega Superstars Tennis	Sumo Digital	Sega	2008-03-18^{NA}	Unreleased	March 18, 2008	March 27, 2008	March 20, 2008
Sengoku Basara 2 Heroes: Double Pack	Capcom	Capcom	2007-11-29^{JP}	November 29, 2007	Unreleased	Unreleased	Unreleased
Sengoku Basara 3 Utage	Capcom	Capcom	2011-11-10^{JP}	November 10, 2011	Unreleased	Unreleased	Unreleased
Sengoku Basara: Samurai Heroes; Sengoku Basara 3^{JP}	Capcom	Capcom	2010-07-29^{JP}	July 29, 2010	October 12, 2010	October 14, 2010	October 15, 2010
Sengoku Musou 3: Moushouden	Omega Force	Tecmo Koei	2011-02-10^{JP}	February 10, 2011	Unreleased	Unreleased	Unreleased
Sesame Street: Cookie's Counting Carnival	Black Lantern Studios	Warner Bros. Interactive Entertainment	2010-10-19^{NA}	Unreleased	October 19, 2010	November 10, 2010	Unreleased
Sesame Street: Elmo's A-to-Zoo Adventure	Black Lantern Studios	Warner Bros. Interactive Entertainment	2010-10-19^{NA}	Unreleased	October 19, 2010	November 10, 2010	Unreleased
Sesame Street: Elmo's Musical Monsterpiece	Griptonite Games	Warner Bros. Interactive Entertainment	2012-06-15^{NA}	Unreleased	June 15, 2012	Unreleased	Unreleased
Sesame Street: Ready, Set, Grover!	Griptonite Games	Warner Bros. Interactive Entertainment	2011-08-02^{NA}	Unreleased	August 2, 2011	August 17, 2011	Unreleased
Shakedown: Hawaii	Vblank Entertainment	Vblank Entertainment	2020-07-09^{EU}	Unreleased	Unreleased	Unreleased	July 9, 2020
Shanghai Wii	Success	Success	2007-12-13^{JP}	December 13, 2007	Unreleased	Unreleased	Unreleased
Shaun White Skateboarding	Ubisoft Montreal	Ubisoft	2010-10-24^{NA}	Unreleased	October 24, 2010	October 28, 2010	October 29, 2010
Shaun White Snowboarding: Road Trip	Ubisoft Montreal	Ubisoft	2008-11-13^{AUS}	Unreleased	November 16, 2008	November 13, 2008	November 14, 2008
Shaun White Snowboarding: World Stage	Ubisoft Montreal	Ubisoft	2009-11-08^{NA}	Unreleased	November 8, 2009	November 12, 2009	November 13, 2009
Shawn Johnson Gymnastics	Artefacts Studio	Zoo Games	2010-11-16^{NA}	Unreleased	November 16, 2010	Unreleased	Unreleased
Sherlock Holmes: The Silver Earring	Frogwares	Focus Home Interactive	2011-11-17^{AUS}	Unreleased	Unreleased	November 17, 2011	November 18, 2011
Shikakui Atama o Maru Kusuru: Kanzen Seiha Wii	Mechanic Arms	IE Institute	2009-04-29^{JP}	April 29, 2009	Unreleased	Unreleased	Unreleased
Shimano Xtreme Fishing	eV Interactive	Mastiff^{NA} Neko Entertainment^{PAL}	2009-10-16^{NA}	Unreleased	October 16, 2009	September 24, 2010	September 24, 2010
Shiren the Wanderer	Chunsoft	Sega^{JP} Atlus^{NA}	2008-06-05^{JP}	June 5, 2008	February 9, 2010	Unreleased	Unreleased
Showtime Championship Boxing	Nikitova Games	DSI Games^{NA} Zoo Digital Publishing^{PAL}	2007-12-13^{NA}	Unreleased	December 13, 2007	February 14, 2008	February 8, 2008
Shrek Forever After	XPEC Entertainment	Activision	2010-05-18^{NA}	Unreleased	May 18, 2010	June 16, 2010	June 18, 2010
Shrek the Third	Amaze Entertainment; Shaba Games	Activision	2007-05-15^{NA}	Unreleased	May 15, 2007	June 6, 2007	June 22, 2007
Shrek's Carnival Craze: Party Games	Ivolgamus	Activision	2008-10-28^{NA}	Unreleased	October 28, 2008	November 26, 2008	November 21, 2008
Sid Meier's Pirates!	Virtuos	2K Games	2010-09-28^{NA}	Unreleased	September 28, 2010	October 8, 2010	October 8, 2010
Silent Hill: Shattered Memories	Climax Studios	Konami	2009-12-08^{NA}	March 25, 2010	December 8, 2009	April 22, 2010	February 26, 2010
SimAnimals	Electronic Arts	Electronic Arts	2009-01-21^{NA}	February 19, 2009	January 21, 2009	February 5, 2009	January 30, 2009
SimAnimals Africa	Electronic Arts	Electronic Arts	2009-10-27^{NA}	November 26, 2009	October 27, 2009	October 29, 2009	October 30, 2009
SimCity Creator	Hudson Soft	Electronic Arts	2008-09-19^{EU}	September 25, 2008	September 22, 2008	October 2, 2008	September 19, 2008
Simple 2000 Series Wii Vol. 1: The Table Game	Yuki Enterprise	D3 Publisher	2008-09-25^{JP}	September 25, 2008	Unreleased	Unreleased	Unreleased
Simple Wii Series Vol. 1: The Minna de Kart Race	Tose	D3 Publisher	2007-10-25^{JP}	October 25, 2007	Unreleased	Unreleased	Unreleased
Simple Wii Series Vol. 2: The Minna de Bass Tsuri Taikai	Tose	D3 Publisher	2007-10-25^{JP}	October 25, 2007	Unreleased	Unreleased	Unreleased
Simple Wii Series Vol. 3: Ason de Wakaru - The Party Casino	D3 Publisher	D3 Publisher	2007-12-27^{JP}	December 27, 2007	Unreleased	Unreleased	Unreleased
Simple Wii Series Vol. 4: The DokoDemo Asoberu - The Shooting Action	D3 Publisher	D3 Publisher	2007-12-27^{JP}	December 27, 2007	Unreleased	Unreleased	Unreleased
Simple Wii Series Vol. 5: The Block Kuzushi	D3 Publisher	D3 Publisher	2008-02-28^{JP}	February 28, 2008	Unreleased	Unreleased	Unreleased
Simple Wii Series Vol. 6: The Wai Wai Combat	D3 Publisher	D3 Publisher	2008-02-28^{JP}	February 28, 2008	Unreleased	Unreleased	Unreleased
The Simpsons Game	EA Redwood Shores; Rebellion Developments	Electronic Arts	2007-10-30^{NA}	Unreleased	October 30, 2007	November 6, 2007	November 2, 2007
The Sims 2: Castaway	EA Redwood Shores	Electronic Arts	2007-10-23^{NA}	Unreleased	October 23, 2007	October 30, 2007	October 26, 2007
The Sims 2: Pets	Maxis	Electronic Arts	2007-06-12^{NA}	Unreleased	June 12, 2007	June 28, 2007	June 22, 2007
The Sims 3	Edge of Reality	Electronic Arts	2010-11-12^{EU}	Unreleased	November 15, 2010	November 18, 2010	November 12, 2010
Sin & Punishment: Star Successor; Sin and Punishment: Successor of the Skies^{PAL}	Treasure	Nintendo	2009-10-29^{JP}	October 29, 2009	June 27, 2010	July 21, 2010	May 7, 2010
Sing4: The Hits Edition	Voxler	Deep Silver^{EU} Crave Games^{NA}	2011-01-11^{EU}	Unreleased	October 31, 2011	Unreleased	January 11, 2011
Six Flags Fun Park; Fun Park Party^{PAL}	7 Studios	Ubisoft	2009-03-03^{NA}	Unreleased	March 3, 2009	June 18, 2009	June 19, 2009
Skate City Heroes	Zeroscale	Zoo Games^{NA} Zushi Games^{EU} Funbox Media^{AUS}	2008-11-24^{NA}	Unreleased	November 24, 2008	October 22, 2009	April 17, 2009
Skate It	EA Black Box; EA Montreal	Electronic Arts	2008-11-19^{NA}	February 12, 2009	November 19, 2008	November 20, 2008	November 21, 2008
Ski and Shoot	49Games	Conspiracy Entertainment	2008-12-09^{NA}	Unreleased	December 9, 2008	Unreleased	Unreleased
Ski-Doo: Snowmobile Challenge	ColdWood Interactive	Valcon Games	2009-10-13^{NA}	Unreleased	October 13, 2009	Unreleased	Unreleased
The Sky Crawlers: Innocent Aces	Project Aces; Access Games	Namco Bandai Games^{JP/PAL} Xseed Games^{NA}	2008-10-16^{JP}	October 16, 2008	January 12, 2010	March 25, 2010	February 26, 2010
Skylanders: Giants	Toys for Bob	Activision	2012-10-17^{AU}	Unreleased	October 21, 2012	October 17, 2012	October 19, 2012
Skylanders: Spyro's Adventure	Toys for Bob	Activision^{WW} Square Enix^{JP}	2011-10-13^{AU}	July 12, 2013	October 16, 2011	October 13, 2011	October 14, 2011
Skylanders: SuperChargers Racing	Beenox	Activision	2015-09-20^{NA}	Unreleased	September 20, 2015	September 24, 2015	September 25, 2015
Skylanders: Swap Force	Vicarious Visions; Beenox	Activision	2013-10-13^{NA}	Unreleased	October 13, 2013	October 16, 2013	October 18, 2013
Skylanders: Trap Team	Toys for Bob; Beenox	Activision	2014-10-02^{AU}	Unreleased	October 5, 2014	October 2, 2014	October 10, 2014
Skyscraper	Atomic Planet Entertainment	Midas Interactive Entertainment	2009-08-14^{EU}	Unreleased	Unreleased	Unreleased	August 14, 2009
Sled Shred featuring the Jamaican Bobsled Team	Just For Fun Studios	SouthPeak Games	2010-10-12^{NA}	Unreleased	October 12, 2010	Unreleased	Unreleased
Smart Series Presents: JaJa's Adventure	CyberPlanet Interactive	UFO Interactive Games	2010-03-16^{NA}	Unreleased	March 16, 2010	Unreleased	Unreleased
Smarty Pants	Planet Moon Studios	Electronic Arts	2007-11-13^{NA}	Unreleased	November 13, 2007	November 22, 2007	November 23, 2007
Smiley World Island Challenge	Frame Studios Interactive	Zoo Games	2009-04-03^{PAL}	Unreleased	June 9, 2009	April 3, 2009	April 3, 2009
The Smurfs 2	WayForward Technologies	Ubisoft	2013-07-18^{AU}	Unreleased	July 23, 2013	July 18, 2013	July 19, 2013
The Smurfs Dance Party	Land Ho!	Ubisoft	2011-07-19^{NA}	Unreleased	July 19, 2011	September 8, 2011	July 29, 2011
Sniper Elite	Raylight SRL	Maximum Family Games^{NA} Reef Entertainment^{PAL}	2010-12-07^{NA}	Unreleased	December 7, 2010	December 10, 2010	December 10, 2010
SNK Arcade Classics Vol. 1	Terminal Reality	SNK Playmore	2008-07-28^{NA}	Unreleased	July 28, 2008	Unreleased	November 28, 2008
So Blonde: Back to the Island	Wizarbox	DTP Entertainment	2010-03-26^{EU}	Unreleased	Unreleased	Unreleased	March 26, 2010
Solitaire & Mahjong	Cosmigo	Crave Entertainment	2009-02-17^{NA}	Unreleased	February 17, 2009	Unreleased	Unreleased
Sonic & Sega All-Stars Racing	Sumo Digital	Sega	2010-02-23^{NA}	Unreleased	February 23, 2010	March 4, 2010	February 26, 2010
Sonic and the Black Knight	Sonic Team	Sega	2009-03-03^{NA}	March 12, 2009	March 3, 2009	March 12, 2009	March 13, 2009
Sonic and the Secret Rings	Sonic Team	Sega	2007-02-20^{NA}	March 15, 2007	February 20, 2007	March 8, 2007	March 2, 2007
Sonic Colors	Sonic Team	Sega	2010-11-11^{AU}	November 18, 2010	November 16, 2010	November 11, 2010	November 12, 2010
Sonic Riders: Zero Gravity	Sonic Team	Sega	2008-01-08^{NA}	January 17, 2008	January 8, 2008	March 6, 2008	February 22, 2008
Sonic Unleashed	Sonic Team; Dimps	Sega	2008-11-18^{NA}	December 18, 2008	November 18, 2008	November 27, 2008	November 28, 2008
Soulcalibur Legends	Project Soul	Namco Bandai Games	2007-11-20^{NA}	December 13, 2007	November 20, 2007	August 28, 2008	August 28, 2008
Soul Eater: Monotone Princess	Square Enix; Bones	Square Enix	2008-09-25^{JP}	September 25, 2008	Unreleased	Unreleased	Unreleased
Space Camp	7 Studios	Activision	2009-05-26^{NA}	Unreleased	May 26, 2009	Unreleased	July 3, 2009
Space Chimps	Redtribe	Brash Entertainment	2008-07-15^{NA}	Unreleased	July 15, 2008	September 15, 2008	August 1, 2008
Spaghetti Western Shooter	Artematica	Bigben Interactive	2011-11-17^{PAL}	Unreleased	Unreleased	November 17, 2011	November 17, 2011
Spectrobes: Origins	Genki	Disney Interactive Studios	2009-08-18^{NA}	June 17, 2010	August 18, 2009	October 4, 2009	September 18, 2009
Speed	Team6 Game Studios	Zoo Games^{NA} Funbox Media^{PAL}	2010-04-29^{NA}	Unreleased	April 29, 2010	December 16, 2010	December 17, 2010
Speed 2	Team6 Game Studios	Easy Interactive	2012-11-28^{EU}	Unreleased	Unreleased	Unreleased	November 28, 2012
Speed Racer: The Videogame	Sidhe Interactive	Warner Bros. Interactive Entertainment	2008-05-06^{NA}	July 10, 2008	May 6, 2008	June 4, 2008	May 9, 2008
SpeedZone; Wheelspin^{PAL}	Awesome Play	Detn8 Games^{NA} Bethesda Softworks^{PAL}	2009-08-18^{NA}	Unreleased	August 18, 2009	November 27, 2009	November 27, 2009
Spellbound Party	puzzle.tv	505 Games	2010-04-23^{EU}	Unreleased	Unreleased	Unreleased	April 23, 2010
Spider-Man 3	Vicarious Visions	Activision	2007-05-04^{NA/PAL}	March 19, 2008	May 4, 2007	May 4, 2007	May 4, 2007
Spider-Man: Edge of Time	Beenox	Activision	2011-10-04^{NA}	Unreleased	October 4, 2011	October 26, 2011	October 14, 2011
Spider-Man: Friend or Foe	Next Level Games	Activision	2007-10-02^{NA}	Unreleased	October 2, 2007	October 10, 2007	October 12, 2007
Spider-Man: Shattered Dimensions	Beenox	Activision	2010-09-07^{NA}	Unreleased	September 7, 2010	September 29, 2010	September 10, 2010
Spider-Man: Web of Shadows	Shaba Games; Treyarch	Activision	2008-10-21^{NA}	Unreleased	October 21, 2008	October 28, 2008	October 24, 2008
The Spiderwick Chronicles	Stormfront Studios	Vivendi Games	2008-02-05^{NA}	Unreleased	February 5, 2008	March 19, 2008	March 14, 2008
SpongeBob SquarePants: Creature from the Krusty Krab	Blitz Games	THQ	2006-11-19^{NA}	March 15, 2007	November 19, 2006	December 12, 2006	December 15, 2006
SpongeBob SquarePants Featuring Nicktoons: Globs of Doom	Incinerator Studios	Play THQ	2008-10-20^{NA}	Unreleased	October 20, 2008	October 23, 2008	October 31, 2008
SpongeBob SquarePants: Plankton's Robotic Revenge	Behaviour Interactive	Activision	2013-10-11^{EU}	Unreleased	October 22, 2013	Unreleased	October 11, 2013
SpongeBob SquigglePants	WayForward Technologies	THQ	2011-04-12^{NA}	Unreleased	April 12, 2011	April 14, 2011	April 15, 2011
SpongeBob's Atlantis SquarePantis	Blitz Games	THQ	2007-11-12^{NA}	Unreleased	November 12, 2007	March 20, 2008	February 14, 2008
SpongeBob's Boating Bash	ImPulse Games	THQ	2010-03-02^{NA}	Unreleased	March 2, 2010	March 25, 2010	March 26, 2010
SpongeBob's Truth or Square	Heavy Iron Studios	THQ	2009-10-26^{NA}	Unreleased	October 26, 2009	November 13, 2009	November 13, 2009
Spore Hero	EA Montreal	Electronic Arts	2009-10-06^{NA}	April 1, 2010	October 6, 2009	October 8, 2009	October 9, 2009
SPRay	Eko Software	Tecmo^{NA} Neko Entertainment^{PAL}	2008-12-03^{NA}	Unreleased	December 3, 2008	2009	2009
Springdale: Riding Adventures	Hidden Entertainment	PAN Vision	2010-03-26^{EU}	Unreleased	Unreleased	Unreleased	March 26, 2010
Spyborgs	Bionic Games	Capcom	2009-09-22^{NA}	Unreleased	September 22, 2009	September 24, 2009	September 25, 2009
Spy Fox in "Dry Cereal"	Mistic Software	Majesco^{NA} Atari Europe^{PAL}	2008-08-29^{NA}	Unreleased	August 29, 2008	December 5, 2008	December 5, 2008
Spy Games: Elevator Mission	Dreams	UFO Interactive Games	2007-11-16^{NA}	Unreleased	November 16, 2007	Unreleased	Unreleased
Squeeballs Party	Eiconic Games	Aksys Games^{NA} Zen United^{PAL}	2009-10-12^{NA}	Unreleased	October 12, 2009	March 18, 2010	October 30, 2009
SSX Blur	EA Montreal	EA Sports BIG	2007-02-27^{NA}	September 13, 2007	February 27, 2007	March 15, 2007	March 16, 2007
Star Trek: Conquest	4J Studios	Bethesda Softworks	2007-11-20^{NA}	Unreleased	November 20, 2007	March 14, 2008	March 14, 2008
Star Wars: The Clone Wars – Lightsaber Duels	Krome Studios	LucasArts	2008-11-11^{NA}	Unreleased	November 11, 2008	November 19, 2008	November 14, 2008
Star Wars: The Clone Wars – Republic Heroes	Krome Studios	LucasArts	2009-10-06^{NA}	Unreleased	October 6, 2009	October 7, 2009	October 9, 2009
Star Wars: The Force Unleashed	Krome Studios	LucasArts^{WW} Activision^{JP}	2008-09-16^{NA}	October 9, 2008	September 16, 2008	September 17, 2008	September 19, 2008
Star Wars: The Force Unleashed II	Red Fly Studio	LucasArts	2010-10-26^{NA}	Unreleased	October 26, 2010	October 27, 2010	October 29, 2010
Story Hour Adventures	Other Ocean Interactive	Zoo Games	2008-12-09^{NA}	Unreleased	December 9, 2008	June 26, 2009	June 26, 2009
Story Hour Fairy Tales	Other Ocean Interactive	Zoo Games	2008-12-28^{NA}	Unreleased	December 28, 2008	June 26, 2009	June 26, 2009
Storybook Workshop; Tele-Shibai Wii^{JP}	Koto	Konami	2009-7-30^{JP}	July 30, 2009	December 1, 2009	Unreleased	Unreleased
Het Studio 100 Speeleiland	Engine Software	Studio 100	2011-06-22^{EU}	Unreleased	Unreleased	Unreleased	June 22, 2011
Sudoku Ball Detective	White Bear BV	Playlogic Entertainment	2009-08-21^{PAL}	Unreleased	Unreleased	August 21, 2009	August 21, 2009
Sugoro Chronicle: Migite ni Ken o Hidarite ni Saikoro o	Compile Heart	Idea Factory	2008-11-20^{JP}	November 20, 2008	Unreleased	Unreleased	Unreleased
Sukeban Shachou Rena	Jorudan	Jorudan	2009-10-22^{JP}	October 22, 2009	Unreleased	Unreleased	Unreleased
Summer Athletics; Summer Athletics: The Ultimate Challenge^{NA}	49Games	Conspiracy Entertainment^{NA} DTP Entertainment^{PAL}	2008-08-04^{NA}	Unreleased	August 4, 2008	August 22, 2008	August 15, 2008
Summer Athletics 2009; World Championship Athletics^{NA}	49Games	DTP Entertainment^{PAL} Conspiracy Entertainment^{NA}	2009-07-24^{PAL}	Unreleased	September 30, 2009	July 24, 2009	July 24, 2009
Summer Challenge: Athletics Tournament	49Games	RTL Sports^{EU} DTP Entertainment^{AUS}	2011-09-02^{EU}	Unreleased	Unreleased	August 16, 2012	September 2, 2011
Summer Sports 2: Island Sports Party; Summer Sports Party^{PAL}	Digital Embryo	Destineer^{NA} Ubisoft^{PAL}	2008-12-18^{NA}	Unreleased	December 18, 2008	July 2, 2009	July 3, 2009
Summer Sports: Paradise Island; Sports Party^{PAL}	Digital Embryo	Destineer^{NA} Ubisoft^{PAL}	2008-04-15^{NA}	Unreleased	April 15, 2008	September 17, 2008	July 11, 2008
Summer Stars 2012	49Games	Deep Silver	2012-06-01^{EU}	Unreleased	July 10, 2012	Unreleased	June 1, 2012
Super Fruit Fall	Aqua Pacific	System 3^{PAL} Codemasters^{NA}	2006-12-08^{EU}	Unreleased	November 17, 2009	January 11, 2007	December 8, 2006
Super Mario All-Stars Limited Edition; Super Mario All-Stars - 25th Anniversary Edition^{PAL}	Nintendo EAD	Nintendo	2010-10-21^{JP}	October 21, 2010	December 12, 2010	December 2, 2010	December 3, 2010
Super Mario Galaxy	Nintendo EAD Tokyo	Nintendo	2007-11-01^{JP}	November 1, 2007	November 12, 2007	November 29, 2007	November 16, 2007
Super Mario Galaxy 2	Nintendo EAD Tokyo	Nintendo	2010-05-23^{NA}	May 27, 2010	May 23, 2010	July 1, 2010	June 11, 2010
Super Monkey Ball: Banana Blitz	New Entertainment R&D Dept.	Sega	2006-11-19^{NA}	December 2, 2006	November 19, 2006	December 7, 2006	December 8, 2006
Super Monkey Ball: Step & Roll	Sega CS1 R&D	Sega	2010-02-09^{NA}	February 25, 2010	February 9, 2010	February 11, 2010	February 12, 2010
Super Paper Mario	Intelligent Systems	Nintendo	2007-04-09^{NA}	April 19, 2007	April 9, 2007	September 20, 2007	September 14, 2007
Super PickUps	Milestone S.r.l.	XS Games	2008-09-15^{NA}	Unreleased	September 15, 2008	Unreleased	Unreleased
Super Robot Wars NEO	Sazanami	Namco Bandai Games	2009-10-29^{JP}	October 29, 2009	Unreleased	Unreleased	Unreleased
Super Sentai Battle Ranger Cross	Namco Bandai Games	Namco Bandai Games	2011-09-09^{JP}	September 9, 2011	Unreleased	Unreleased	Unreleased
Super Smash Bros. Brawl	Sora Ltd.; Game Arts	Nintendo	2008-01-31^{JP}	January 31, 2008	March 9, 2008	June 26, 2008	June 27, 2008
Super Sonic Racer	Team6 Game Studios	Zoo Games^{NA} Funbox Media^{EU}	2011-07-19^{NA}	Unreleased	July 19, 2011	Unreleased	July 27, 2012
Super Swing Golf; PangYa! Golf With Style^{PAL}	Ntreev Soft	Tecmo^{JP/NA} Nintendo^{PAL}	2006-12-02^{JP}	December 2, 2006	December 12, 2006	September 6, 2007	June 8, 2007
Super Swing Golf: Season 2 Super Swing Golf^{EU}	Tecmo	Tecmo^{JP/NA} Rising Star Games^{EU}	2007-11-29^{JP}	November 29, 2007	December 11, 2007	Unreleased	July 4, 2008
Surf's Up	Ubisoft Montreal	Ubisoft	2007-05-29^{NA}	Unreleased	May 29, 2007	August 30, 2007	August 3, 2007
Survivor	Smack Down Productions	Mindscape^{AUS} Valcon Games^{NA}	2009-12-09^{AUS}	Unreleased	October 19, 2010	December 9, 2009	Unreleased
Sushi Go-Round	Asylum Entertainment	SouthPeak Games	2010-03-30^{NA}	Unreleased	March 30, 2010	Unreleased	Unreleased
Suzumiya Haruhi no Gekidō	Kadokawa Shoten	Kadokawa Shoten	2009-01-22^{JP}	January 22, 2009	Unreleased	Unreleased	Unreleased
Suzumiya Haruhi no Heiretsu	Cavia	Sega	2009-03-26^{JP}	March 26, 2009	Unreleased	Unreleased	Unreleased
Swords	Panic Button	Majesco	2010-09-20^{NA}	Unreleased	September 20, 2010	Unreleased	Unreleased
Taiko no Tatsujin Wii	Namco Bandai Games	Namco Bandai Games	2008-12-11^{JP}	December 11, 2008	Unreleased	Unreleased	Unreleased
Taiko no Tatsujin Wii: Chogouka-Ban	Namco Bandai Games	Namco Bandai Games	2012-11-29^{JP}	November 29, 2012	Unreleased	Unreleased	Unreleased
Taiko no Tatsujin Wii: Do Don to 2 Daime	Namco Bandai Games	Namco Bandai Games	2009-11-19^{JP}	November 19, 2009	Unreleased	Unreleased	Unreleased
Taiko no Tatsujin Wii: Kettei-Ban	Namco Bandai Games	Namco Bandai Games	2011-11-23^{JP}	November 23, 2011	Unreleased	Unreleased	Unreleased
Taiko no Tatsujin Wii: Minna de Party 3 Daime	Namco Bandai Games	Namco Bandai Games	2010-12-02^{JP}	December 2, 2010	Unreleased	Unreleased	Unreleased
Tak and the Guardians of Gross	Blitz Games	Play THQ	2008-10-13^{NA}	Unreleased	October 13, 2008	October 23, 2008	October 31, 2008
Takt of Magic	Taito	Nintendo	2009-05-21^{JP}	May 21, 2009	Unreleased	Unreleased	Unreleased
The Tale of Despereaux	Sensory Sweep Studios	Atari^{NA} Warner Bros. Interactive Entertainment^{PAL}	2008-12-02^{NA}	Unreleased	December 2, 2008	December 5, 2008	December 5, 2008
Tales of Graces	Namco Tales Studio	Namco Bandai Games	2009-12-10^{JP}	December 10, 2009	Unreleased	Unreleased	Unreleased
Tales of Symphonia: Dawn of the New World	Namco Tales Studio	Namco Bandai Games	2008-06-26^{JP}	June 26, 2008	November 11, 2008	November 26, 2009	November 13, 2009
Tamagotchi no Furifuri Kagekidan	h.a.n.d.	Namco Bandai Games	2007-12-06^{JP}	December 6, 2007	Unreleased	Unreleased	Unreleased
Tamagotchi: Party On!	h.a.n.d.	Namco Bandai Games	2006-12-02^{JP}	December 2, 2006	May 29, 2007	September 13, 2007	August 31, 2007
Tangled: The Video Game	Planet Moon Studios	Disney Interactive Studios	2010-11-23^{NA}	Unreleased	November 23, 2010	December 2010	January 21, 2011
Target: Terror	Leviathan Games	Konami	2008-04-22^{NA}	Unreleased	April 22, 2008	Unreleased	Unreleased
Tatsunoko vs. Capcom: Cross Generation of Heroes	Eighting	Capcom	2008-12-11^{JP}	December 11, 2008	Unreleased	Unreleased	Unreleased
Tatsunoko vs. Capcom: Ultimate All-Stars	Eighting	Capcom	2010-01-26^{NA}	January 28, 2010	January 26, 2010	February 4, 2010	January 29, 2010
Teenage Mutant Ninja Turtles	Magic Pockets	Activision	2013-10-22^{NA}	Unreleased	October 22, 2013	Unreleased	October 25, 2013
Teenage Mutant Ninja Turtles: Smash-Up	Game Arts	Ubisoft	2009-09-22^{NA}	Unreleased	September 22, 2009	October 1, 2009	September 25, 2009
Télé 7 Jeux: Mots Croisés	Grandslam Entertainments	White Park Bay Software	2008-07-02^{EU}	Unreleased	Unreleased	Unreleased	July 2, 2008
Télé 7 Jeux: Mots Fléchés	Grandslam Entertainments	White Park Bay Software	2008-07-04^{EU}	Unreleased	Unreleased	Unreleased	July 4, 2008
Telly Addicts	Route 1 Games	Ubisoft	2008-02-15^{EU}	Unreleased	Unreleased	Unreleased	February 15, 2008
Tenchu: Shadow Assassins	Acquire	FromSoftware^{JP} Ubisoft^{WW}	2008-10-23^{JP}	October 23, 2008	February 5, 2009	March 12, 2009	March 12, 2009
Ten Pin Alley 2	Other Ocean Interactive	XS Games	2008-10-22^{NA}	Unreleased	October 22, 2008	Unreleased	Unreleased
Tetris Party Deluxe	Hudson Soft	Tetris Online, Inc.^{WW} Hudson Soft^{JP}	2010-05-25^{NA}	August 5, 2010	May 25, 2010	October 14, 2010	September 3, 2010
Thomas & Friends: Hero of the Rails	Barnstorm Games	Barnstorm Games	2010-08-20^{PAL}	Unreleased	Unreleased	August 20, 2010	August 20, 2010
Th!nk Logic Trainer	Independent Arts Software	Conspiracy Entertainment^{NA} Mindscape^{EU}	2009-12-01^{NA}	Unreleased	December 1, 2009	Unreleased	February 9, 2010
Thor: God of Thunder	Red Fly Studio	Sega	2011-04-28^{AUS}	Unreleased	May 3, 2011	April 28, 2011	April 29, 2011
Thrillville: Off the Rails	Frontier Developments	LucasArts	2007-10-16^{NA}	Unreleased	October 16, 2007	October 25, 2007	October 19, 2007
Tiger Woods PGA Tour 07	EA Salt Lake	EA Sports	2007-03-13^{NA}	Unreleased	March 13, 2007	March 15, 2007	March 23, 2007
Tiger Woods PGA Tour 08	EA Salt Lake	EA Sports	2007-08-28^{NA}	November 8, 2007	August 28, 2007	August 30, 2007	August 31, 2007
Tiger Woods PGA Tour 09 All-Play	EA Tiburon	EA Sports	2008-08-26^{NA}	March 19, 2009	August 26, 2008	August 28, 2007	August 29, 2008
Tiger Woods PGA Tour 10	EA Tiburon	EA Sports	2009-06-08^{NA}	Unreleased	June 8, 2009	July 2, 2009	July 3, 2009
Tiger Woods PGA Tour 11	EA Tiburon	EA Sports	2010-06-08^{NA}	Unreleased	June 8, 2010	June 30, 2010	July 2, 2010
Tiger Woods PGA Tour 12: The Masters	EA Tiburon	EA Sports	2011-03-29^{NA}	Unreleased	March 29, 2011	March 31, 2011	April 1, 2011
Titanic Mystery	Joindots	Purple Hills^{EU} O-Games^{NA}	2010-09-23^{EU}	Unreleased	April 3, 2012	Unreleased	September 23, 2010
Titeuf le film	Tate Interactive	Deep Silver	2011-03-31^{EU}	Unreleased	Unreleased	Unreleased	March 31, 2011
TMNT	Ubisoft Montreal	Ubisoft	2007-03-20^{NA}	Unreleased	March 20, 2007	March 22, 2007	March 22, 2007
TNA Impact!	Midway Studios Los Angeles	Midway	2008-09-16^{NA}	Unreleased	September 16, 2008	October 3, 2008	October 3, 2008
Tokyo Friend Park II Ketteiban: Minna de Chousen! Taikan Attraction	Art Co., Ltd	Spike	2009-12-03^{JP}	December 3, 2009	Unreleased	Unreleased	Unreleased
Tom Clancy's Ghost Recon	Next Level Games	Ubisoft	2010-11-16^{NA}	Unreleased	November 16, 2010	November 25, 2010	November 19, 2010
Tom Clancy's H.A.W.X 2	Ubisoft Bucharest	Ubisoft	2010-11-09^{NA}	Unreleased	November 9, 2010	November 11, 2010	November 12, 2010
Tom Clancy's Splinter Cell: Double Agent	Ubisoft Montreal	Ubisoft	2006-11-28^{NA}	Unreleased	November 28, 2006	December 7, 2006	December 8, 2006
Tomb Raider: Anniversary	Crystal Dynamics; Buzz Monkey Software	Eidos Interactive^{WW} Spike^{JP}	2007-11-13^{NA}	March 27, 2008	November 13, 2007	February 7, 2008	December 7, 2007
Tomb Raider: Underworld	Buzz Monkey Software	Eidos Interactive^{WW} Spike^{JP}	2008-11-18^{NA}	April 23, 2009	November 18, 2008	December 4, 2008	November 21, 2008
Tony Hawk: Ride	Buzz Monkey Software	Activision	2009-11-17^{NA}	Unreleased	November 17, 2009	March 10, 2010	December 4, 2009
Tony Hawk: Shred	Robomodo	Activision	2010-10-26^{NA}	Unreleased	October 26, 2010	November 17, 2010	October 29, 2010
Tony Hawk's Downhill Jam	Toys for Bob	Activision	2006-11-19^{NA}	Unreleased	November 19, 2006	December 13, 2006	December 8, 2006
Tony Hawk's Proving Ground	Page 44 Studios	Activision	2007-10-16^{NA}	Unreleased	October 16, 2007	October 31, 2007	November 2, 2007
Top Model Academy	Independent Arts Software	SevenOne Intermedia	2011-11-11^{EU}	Unreleased	Unreleased	Unreleased	November 11, 2011
Top Shot Arcade	Budcat Creations	Activision	2011-03-07^{NA}	Unreleased	March 7, 2011	Unreleased	Unreleased
Top Shot Dinosaur Hunter	Cauldron	Activision	2011-12-01^{NA}	Unreleased	December 1, 2011	Unreleased	Unreleased
Top Spin 3	PAM Development	2K Sports^{WW} D3 Publisher^{JP}	2008-06-20^{EU}	September 23, 2009	June 23, 2008	June 27, 2008	June 20, 2008
Top Spin 4	2K Czech	2K Sports	2011-03-15^{NA}	Unreleased	March 15, 2011	March 18, 2011	March 18, 2011
Top Trumps Adventures	SoGoPlay	Ubisoft	2007-12-07^{EU}	Unreleased	Unreleased	Unreleased	December 7, 2007
Top Trumps: Doctor Who	Team 3 Games	Eidos Interactive	2008-12-05^{EU}	Unreleased	Unreleased	Unreleased	December 5, 2008
Tornado Outbreak	Loose Cannon Studios	Konami	2009-09-29^{NA}	Unreleased	September 29, 2009	Unreleased	November 13, 2009
Toshinden	DreamFactory	Takara Tomy	2009-12-10^{JP}	December 10, 2009	Unreleased	Unreleased	Unreleased
Totally Spies! Totally Party	OUAT Entertainment	Ubisoft^{EU} Valcon Games^{NA}	2008-02-15^{EU}	Unreleased	March 24, 2009	Unreleased	February 15, 2008
Tournament of Legends	High Voltage Software	Sega	2010-07-01^{AUS}	Unreleased	July 6, 2010	July 1, 2010	July 2, 2010
Tournament Pool	Blade Interactive	Destineer	2009-05-21^{NA}	Unreleased	May 21, 2009	Unreleased	Unreleased
Toy Story 3	Avalanche Software	Disney Interactive Studios	2010-06-15^{NA}	Unreleased	June 15, 2010	June 17, 2010	July 16, 2010
Toy Story Mania!	Papaya Studio	Disney Interactive Studios	2009-09-15^{NA}	Unreleased	September 15, 2009	October 13, 2009	September 24, 2009
TrackMania: Build to Race; TrackMania^{PAL}	Firebrand Games	Focus Home Interactive^{PAL} City Interactive^{NA}	2010-09-23^{PAL}	Unreleased	March 24, 2011	September 23, 2010	September 23, 2010
Transformers: Cybertron Adventures	Next Level Games	Activision	2010-06-22^{NA}	Unreleased	June 22, 2010	June 23, 2010	June 25, 2010
Transformers: Dark of the Moon Stealth Force Edition	Behaviour Interactive	Activision	2011-06-14^{NA}	Unreleased	June 14, 2011	June 29, 2011	June 24, 2011
Transformers: The Game	Traveller's Tales	Activision	2007-06-26^{NA}	March 13, 2008	June 26, 2007	July 4, 2007	July 20, 2007
Transformers: Prime – The Game	Now Production	Activision	2012-10-30^{NA}	Unreleased	October 30, 2012	October 31, 2012	November 2, 2012
Transformers: Revenge of the Fallen	Krome Studios	Activision	2009-06-23^{NA}	Unreleased	June 23, 2009	June 24, 2009	June 26, 2009
Trauma Center: New Blood	Atlus; Media.Vision	Atlus^{NA/JP} Nintendo^{PAL}	2007-11-20^{NA}	January 17, 2008	November 20, 2007	January 22, 2009	November 7, 2008
Trauma Center: Second Opinion	Atlus	Atlus^{NA/JP} Nintendo^{PAL}	2006-11-19^{NA}	December 2, 2006	November 19, 2006	August 28, 2008	August 10, 2007
Trauma Team	Atlus; Media.Vision	Atlus	2010-05-18^{NA}	June 17, 2010	May 18, 2010	Unreleased	Unreleased
Triple Crown Championship Snowboarding	Magellan Interactive	Destineer	2010-02-16^{NA}	Unreleased	February 16, 2010	Unreleased	Unreleased
Trivial Pursuit	EA Bright Light	Electronic Arts	2009-03-10^{NA}	Unreleased	March 10, 2009	March 12, 2009	March 13, 2009
Trivial Pursuit: Bet You Know It	Papaya Studio	Electronic Arts	2011-11-01^{NA}	Unreleased	November 1, 2011	Unreleased	November 4, 2011
Tron Evolution: Battle Grids	n-Space	Disney Interactive Studios	2010-11-25^{AUS}	Unreleased	December 7, 2010	November 25, 2010	November 26, 2010
Truck Racer	Brain in a Jar	Nordic Games^{PAL} Virtual Play Games^{NA}	2009-06-25^{EU}	Unreleased	July 17, 2009	2009	June 25, 2009
Truth or Lies	Big Ant Studios	THQ	2010-09-14^{NA}	Unreleased	September 14, 2010	November 4, 2010	November 19, 2010
Turbo: Super Stunt Squad	Monkey Bar Games	D3 Publisher	2013-07-16^{NA}	Unreleased	July 16, 2013	September 12, 2013	October 11, 2013
Turbo Trainz	Broken Switch Studios	N3V Games	2012-03-23^{EU}	Unreleased	Unreleased	November 23, 2012	March 23, 2012
TV Show King Party	Gameloft Montreal	Gameloft	2008-10-28^{NA}	Unreleased	October 28, 2008	November 13, 2008	November 13, 2008
TV Total Events	Caipirinha Games	SevenOne Intermedia	2011-04-08^{EU}	Unreleased	Unreleased	Unreleased	April 8, 2011
Twinkle Queen	MileStone Inc.	MileStone Inc.	2010-08-26^{JP}	August 26, 2010	Unreleased	Unreleased	Unreleased
Twin Strike: Operation Thunder	NAPS team	Zoo Digital Publishing^{NA/EU} Funbox Media^{AUS}	2008-10-28^{NA}	Unreleased	October 28, 2008	2011	January 2009
U-Sing	Mindscape	Mindscape	2009-11-06^{PAL}	Unreleased	Unreleased	November 6, 2009	November 6, 2009
U-Sing 2 U-Sing 2 Australian Edition^{AUS}	Mindscape	Mindscape	2010-12-03^{PAL}	Unreleased	Unreleased	December 3, 2010	December 3, 2010
U-Sing Girls Night	Mindscape	Mindscape	2010-06-18^{EU}	Unreleased	Unreleased	June 24, 2010	June 18, 2010
U-Sing Johnny Hallyday	Mindscape	Mindscape	2010-06-15^{EU}	Unreleased	Unreleased	Unreleased	June 15, 2010
uDraw Studio	Pipeworks Software	THQ	2010-11-14^{NA}	Unreleased	November 14, 2010	February 24, 2011	March 4, 2011
uDraw Studio: Instant Artist	Pipeworks Software	THQ	2011-11-15^{NA}	Unreleased	November 15, 2011	November 17, 2011	November 18, 2011
UFC Personal Trainer	Heavy Iron Studios	THQ	2011-07-12^{NA}	Unreleased	July 12, 2011	July 13, 2011	July 22, 2011
Ultimate Band	Fall Line Studios	Disney Interactive Studios	2008-11-25^{NA}	Unreleased	November 25, 2008	April 14, 2009	April 9, 2009
The Ultimate Battle of the Sexes	Neopica	DTP Entertainment^{EU} Conspiracy Entertainment^{NA}	2010-12-17^{EU}	Unreleased	December 27, 2011	Unreleased	December 17, 2010
Ultimate Board Game Collection	Mere Mortals	Valcon Games^{NA} Empire Interactive^{EU}	2007-08-14^{NA}	Unreleased	August 14, 2007	Unreleased	May 2, 2008
Ultimate Duck Hunting	Mid Carolina Media	Detn8 Games	2007-12-03^{NA}	Unreleased	December 3, 2007	Unreleased	Unreleased
Ultimate I Spy	Gusto Games	Scholastic Corporation^{NA} Majesco^{EU}	2008-10-29^{NA}	Unreleased	October 29, 2008	Unreleased	October 23, 2009
Ultimate Party Challenge; Let's Party^{EU}	Groove Box Japan	Konami	2009-11-03^{NA}	November 19, 2009	November 3, 2009	Unreleased	December 3, 2009
The Ultimate Red Ball Challenge	Smack Down Productions	Mindscape	2009-11-06^{EU}	Unreleased	Unreleased	September 24, 2010	November 6, 2009
Ultimate Shooting Collection; MileStone Shooting Collection Karous Wii^{JP}	MileStone Inc.	MileStone Inc.^{JP} UFO Interactive Games^{NA}	2008-04-10^{JP}	April 10, 2008	February 2, 2009	Unreleased	Unreleased
Up	Heavy Iron Studios	THQ^{WW} e frontier^{JP}	2009-05-26^{NA}	December 3, 2009	May 26, 2009	August 27, 2009	October 2, 2009
Urban Extreme: Street Rage	Data Design Interactive	Data Design Interactive	2008-07-25^{EU}	Unreleased	Unreleased	Unreleased	July 25, 2008
Vacation Isle: Beach Party	FarSight Studios	Warner Bros. Interactive Entertainment	2010-06-08^{NA}	Unreleased	June 8, 2010	June 30, 2010	June 18, 2010
Valhalla Knights: Eldar Saga; Eldar Saga^{EU}	K2	Xseed Games^{NA} Marvelous Entertainment^{JP} Rising Star Games^{EU}	2009-09-29^{NA}	October 8, 2009	September 29, 2009	Unreleased	September 17, 2010
Vegas Party	Visual Impact	Storm City Games^{NA} Enjoy Gaming^{PAL}	2009-10-27^{NA}	Unreleased	October 27, 2009	February 2010	February 2010
Veggy World	CyberPlanet Interactive	Virtual Play Games	2010-05-18^{NA}	Unreleased	May 18, 2010	Unreleased	Unreleased
Vertigo	Icon Games Entertainment	Playlogic Entertainment	2009-05-08^{EU}	Unreleased	June 16, 2009	Unreleased	May 8, 2009
Victorious Boxers: Revolution; Victorious Boxers: Challenge^{PAL}	Grand Prix; Cavia	AQ Interactive^{JP} Xseed Games^{NA} Ubisoft^{PAL}	2007-06-21^{JP}	June 21, 2007	October 23, 2007	March 2008	April 11, 2008
Victorious: Taking the Lead	High Voltage Software	D3 Publisher	2012-11-13^{NA}	Unreleased	November 13, 2012	Unreleased	November 30, 2012
Violetta: Rhythm & Music	Game Machine Studios	Little Orbit	2014-09-26^{NA/EU}	Unreleased	September 26, 2014	Unreleased	September 26, 2014
Virtua Tennis 4	Sega	Sega	2011-04-29^{EU}	Unreleased	May 10, 2011	May 5, 2011	April 29, 2011
Virtua Tennis 2009	Sumo Digital	Sega	2009-06-09^{NA}	Unreleased	June 9, 2009	June 19, 2009	June 12, 2009
The Voice	Voxler	Bigben Interactive	2016-11-25^{EU}	Unreleased	Unreleased	Unreleased	November 25, 2016
The Voice: I Want You	Zoë Mode	Activision	2014-10-21^{NA}	Unreleased	October 21, 2014	Unreleased	Unreleased
The Voice of Germany	Le Cortex	bitComposer Games	2012-11-08^{EU}	Unreleased	Unreleased	Unreleased	November 8, 2012
The Voice of Germany Vol. 2	Le Cortex	bitComposer Games	2013-10-31^{EU}	Unreleased	Unreleased	Unreleased	October 31, 2013
Wacky Races: Crash and Dash	Eidos Studios, Sweden AB	Eidos Interactive	2008-06-17^{NA}	Unreleased	June 17, 2008	Unreleased	June 27, 2008
Wacky World of Sports	Tabot	Sega	2009-09-17^{AUS}	October 29, 2009	September 22, 2009	September 17, 2009	September 18, 2009
Walk It Out! Step to the Beat^{EU}	A.I	Konami	2010-01-12^{NA}	Unreleased	January 12, 2010	Unreleased	March 26, 2010
WALL-E	Heavy Iron Studios	THQ	2008-06-24^{NA}	December 11, 2008	June 24, 2008	September 4, 2008	July 4, 2008
Wario Land: Shake It! Wario Land: The Shake Dimension^{PAL}	Good-Feel	Nintendo	2008-07-24^{JP}	July 24, 2008	September 22, 2008	September 25, 2008	September 26, 2008
WarioWare: Smooth Moves	Nintendo SPD; Intelligent Systems	Nintendo	2006-12-02^{JP}	December 2, 2006	January 15, 2007	January 25, 2007	January 12, 2007
Warning: Code De La Route	Black Sheep Studio	Neko Entertainment	2008-06-27^{EU}	Unreleased	Unreleased	Unreleased	June 27, 2008
Water Sports	Frontline Studios	GameMill Entertainment^{NA} Avanquest Software^{PAL}	2009-10-27^{NA}	Unreleased	October 27, 2009	March 1, 2010	February 26, 2010
We Cheer	Machatin	Namco Bandai Games^{NA/JP} 505 Games^{PAL}	2008-09-30^{NA}	March 12, 2009	September 30, 2008	June 11, 2009	February 6, 2009
We Cheer 2	Machatin	Namco Bandai Games	2009-11-03^{NA}	July 15, 2010	November 3, 2009	Unreleased	Unreleased
We Dance	Le Cortex	Nordic Games	2011-09-02^{EU}	Unreleased	Unreleased	Unreleased	September 2, 2011
We Dare	Ubisoft Milan	Ubisoft	2011-03-14^{EU}	Unreleased	Unreleased	April 14, 2011	March 14, 2011
We Love Golf!	Camelot Software Planning	Capcom	2007-12-13^{JP}	December 13, 2007	July 15, 2008	August 7, 2008	July 4, 2008
We Rock: Drum King; Rolling Stone: Drum King^{NA}	DEL	505 Games	2009-04-09^{EU}	Unreleased	May 26, 2009	June 4, 2009	April 9, 2009
We Sing	Le Cortex	Nordic Games	2009-11-12^{AUS}	Unreleased	Unreleased	November 12, 2009	November 13, 2009
We Sing 80s	Le Cortex	Nordic Games	2012-09-28^{EU}	Unreleased	February 8, 2013	Unreleased	September 28, 2012
We Sing Deutsche Hits	Le Cortex	Nordic Games	2011-05-26^{EU}	Unreleased	Unreleased	Unreleased	May 26, 2011
We Sing Deutsche Hits 2	Le Cortex	Nordic Games	2012-11-22^{EU}	Unreleased	Unreleased	Unreleased	November 22, 2012
We Sing Down Under	Le Cortex	Nordic Games	2011-03-31^{AUS}	Unreleased	Unreleased	March 31, 2011	Unreleased
We Sing Encore	Le Cortex	Nordic Games	2010-08-20^{EU}	Unreleased	Unreleased	September 2, 2010	August 20, 2010
We Sing Pop!	Le Cortex	Nordic Games	2012-03-23^{EU}	Unreleased	December 14, 2012	Unreleased	March 23, 2012
We Sing Robbie Williams	Le Cortex	Nordic Games	2010-11-12^{EU}	Unreleased	Unreleased	November 18, 2010	November 12, 2010
We Sing Rock!	Le Cortex	Nordic Games	2011-11-11^{EU}	Unreleased	Unreleased	Unreleased	November 11, 2011
We Sing UK Hits	Le Cortex	Nordic Games	2011-09-30^{EU}	Unreleased	April 19, 2013	Unreleased	September 30, 2011
We Ski; Family Ski^{JP/EU}	Namco Bandai Games	Namco Bandai Games	2008-01-31^{JP}	January 31, 2008	May 13, 2008	Unreleased	June 13, 2008
We Ski & Snowboard; Family Ski & Snowboard^{PAL}	Namco Bandai Games	Namco Bandai Games	2008-11-13^{JP}	November 13, 2008	March 3, 2009	March 20, 2009	February 27, 2009
We Wish You a Merry Christmas	Panic Button	Destineer^{NA} Funbox Media^{EU}	2009-11-04^{NA}	Unreleased	November 4, 2009	Unreleased	September 5, 2011
Wheel of Fortune	Pipeworks Software	THQ	2010-11-02^{NA}	Unreleased	November 2, 2010	December 21, 2010	December 21, 2010
Where the Wild Things Are	Griptonite Games	Warner Bros. Interactive Entertainment	2009-10-13^{NA}	Unreleased	October 13, 2009	November 25, 2009	November 27, 2009
Where's Waldo? The Fantastic Journey	Ludia	Ubisoft	2009-09-22^{NA}	Unreleased	September 22, 2009	Unreleased	Unreleased
Who Wants to Be a Millionaire?	Ludia	Ubisoft	2010-10-05^{NA}	Unreleased	October 5, 2010	Unreleased	Unreleased
Who Wants to Be a Millionaire? 1st Edition	Route 1 Games	Ubisoft	2007-12-07^{EU}	Unreleased	Unreleased	Unreleased	December 7, 2007
Who Wants to Be a Millionaire? 2nd Edition	Route 1 Games	Ubisoft	2008-11-27^{AUS}	Unreleased	Unreleased	November 27, 2008	November 28, 2008
Wi-Fi Taiô: Gensen Table Games Wii	Hudson Soft	Hudson Soft	2008-05-22^{JP}	May 22, 2008	Unreleased	Unreleased	Unreleased
Wicked Monsters Blast!	Corecell Technology	Valcon Games^{NA} Corecell Technology^{PAL}	2011-07-07^{NA}	Unreleased	July 7, 2011	March 9, 2012	March 9, 2012
Wii Chess	Nintendo SPD	Nintendo	2008-01-18^{EU}	Unreleased (Note: Released via WiiWare as Tsūshin Taikyoku: World Chess.)	Unreleased	Unreleased	January 18, 2008
Wii Fit	Nintendo EAD	Nintendo	2007-12-01^{JP}	December 1, 2007	May 19, 2008	May 8, 2008	April 25, 2008
Wii Fit Plus	Nintendo EAD	Nintendo	2009-10-01^{JP}	October 1, 2009	October 4, 2009	October 15, 2009	October 30, 2009
Wii Music	Nintendo EAD	Nintendo	2008-10-16^{JP}	October 16, 2008	October 20, 2008	November 13, 2008	November 14, 2008
Wii Party	NDcube	Nintendo	2010-07-08^{JP}	July 8, 2010	October 3, 2010	October 7, 2010	October 8, 2010
Wii Play	Nintendo EAD	Nintendo	2006-12-02^{JP}	December 2, 2006	February 12, 2007	December 7, 2006	December 8, 2006
Wii Play: Motion	Arzest; Chunsoft; Good-Feel; Mitchell Corporation; NDcube; Nintendo SPD; Prope; Skip Ltd.; Vanpool	Nintendo	2011-06-13^{NA}	July 7, 2011	June 13, 2011	June 30, 2011	June 24, 2011
Wii Sports	Nintendo EAD	Nintendo	2006-11-19^{NA}	December 2, 2006	November 19, 2006	December 7, 2006	December 8, 2006
Wii Sports Resort	Nintendo EAD	Nintendo	2009-06-25^{JP}	June 25, 2009	July 26, 2009	July 23, 2009	July 24, 2009
Wild Earth: African Safari	Super X Studios	Majesco	2008-04-22^{NA}	Unreleased	April 22, 2008	November 27, 2008	September 12, 2008
Wild West Shootout	Frontline Studios	Zoo Games^{NA} Funbox Media^{PAL}	2010-09-14^{NA}	Unreleased	September 14, 2010	March 3, 2011	November 26, 2010
Wing Island	CAProduction	Hudson Soft	2006-12-02^{JP}	December 2, 2006	March 20, 2007	March 29, 2007	April 13, 2007
Winning Eleven Playmaker 2010: Aoki Samurai no Chousen	Konami	Konami	2010-05-20^{JP}	May 20, 2010	Unreleased	Unreleased	Unreleased
Winning Post 7 Maximum 2008	Koei	Koei	2008-03-13^{JP}	March 13, 2008	Unreleased	Unreleased	Unreleased
Winning Post World	Koei	Koei	2009-04-02^{JP}	April 2, 2009	Unreleased	Unreleased	Unreleased
Winning Post World 2010	Koei	Koei	2010-04-02^{JP}	April 2, 2010	Unreleased	Unreleased	Unreleased
Winter Blast: 9 Snow & Ice Games	Digital Embryo	Destineer	2010-02-23^{NA}	Unreleased	February 23, 2010	Unreleased	Unreleased
Winter Sports 2011: Go for Gold	49Games	DTP Entertainment	2011-03-18^{EU}	Unreleased	Unreleased	Unreleased	March 18, 2011
Winter Sports 2012: Feel the Spirit	Independent Arts Software	DTP Entertainment	2011-12-06^{EU}	Unreleased	Unreleased	Unreleased	December 6, 2011
Winter Sports 2: The Next Challenge; Winter Sports 2009: The Next Challenge^{EU/JP}	49Games	Conspiracy Entertainment^{NA} RTL Sports^{EU} Arc System Works^{JP}	2008-11-25^{NA}	March 19, 2009	November 25, 2008	Unreleased	November 27, 2008
Winter Sports 3: The Great Tournament; Winter Sports 2010: The Great Tournament^{EU}	49Games	RTL Sports^{EU} Zoo Games^{NA}	2010-01-15^{EU}	Unreleased	September 10, 2010	Unreleased	January 15, 2010
Winter Sports: The Ultimate Challenge; RTL Winter Sports 2008: The Ultimate Challenge^{EU}	49Games	RTL Sports^{EU} Conspiracy Entertainment^{NA}	2007-11-30^{EU}	Unreleased	December 11, 2007	Unreleased	November 30, 2007
Winter Stars	49Games	Deep Silver	2011-11-09^{AUS}	Unreleased	November 18, 2011	November 9, 2011	November 25, 2011
Wipeout 2	Behaviour Interactive	Activision	2011-10-11^{NA}	Unreleased	October 11, 2011	Unreleased	Unreleased
Wipeout 3	Behaviour Interactive	Activision	2012-09-25^{NA}	Unreleased	September 25, 2012	Unreleased	Unreleased
Wipeout: Create & Crash	Behaviour Interactive	Activision	2013-10-15^{NA}	Unreleased	October 15, 2013	Unreleased	Unreleased
Wipeout: The Game	A.C.R.O.N.Y.M. Games	Activision	2010-06-22^{NA}	Unreleased	June 22, 2010	Unreleased	Unreleased
Wonder World Amusement Park	Coyote Console	Majesco	2008-07-08^{NA}	Unreleased	July 8, 2008	November 7, 2008	October 17, 2008
WordJong Party	Magellan Interactive	Destineer	2008-12-18^{NA}	Unreleased	December 18, 2008	Unreleased	Unreleased
World Championship Poker: Featuring Howard Lederer "All In"	Point of View	Crave Entertainment^{NA} 505 Games^{EU}	2007-05-29^{NA}	Unreleased	May 29, 2007	Unreleased	October 19, 2007
The World of Golden Eggs: Nori Nori Rhythm-kei	Artoon	AQ Interactive	2008-06-26^{JP}	June 26, 2008	Unreleased	Unreleased	Unreleased
World of Zoo	Blue Fang Games	THQ	2009-10-26^{NA}	Unreleased	October 26, 2009	November 5, 2009	November 6, 2009
World Party Games; World Game Tour^{EU}	Nurogames	DreamCatcher Interactive^{NA} 505 Games^{EU}	2009-12-27^{NA}	Unreleased	December 27, 2009	Unreleased	April 23, 2010
World Series of Poker: Tournament of Champions	Left Field Productions	Activision	2006-12-12^{NA}	Unreleased	December 12, 2006	March 14, 2007	March 16, 2007
World Sports Party; Vacation Sports^{NA}	Mere Mortals	Ubisoft	2009-03-19^{AUS}	Unreleased	March 31, 2009	March 19, 2009	March 27, 2009
Worms: Battle Islands	Team17	THQ	2010-11-23^{NA}	Unreleased	November 23, 2010	November 25, 2010	November 26, 2010
Worms: A Space Oddity	Team17	THQ	2008-03-18^{NA}	Unreleased	March 18, 2008	March 27, 2008	March 28, 2008
Wreck-It Ralph	Pipeworks Software	Activision	2012-10-30^{NA}	Unreleased	October 30, 2012	December 19, 2012	November 30, 2012
WSC Real 08: World Snooker Championship	Blade Interactive	Blade Interactive	2008-11-14^{PAL}	Unreleased	Unreleased	November 14, 2008	November 14, 2008
WSC Real 09: World Snooker Championship	Blade Interactive	Blade Interactive	2009-08-28^{PAL}	Unreleased	Unreleased	August 28, 2009	August 28, 2009
WWE '12	Yuke's	THQ	2011-11-22^{NA}	Unreleased	November 22, 2011	November 24, 2011	November 25, 2011
WWE '13	Yuke's	THQ	2012-10-30^{NA}	Unreleased	October 30, 2012	November 1, 2012	November 2, 2012
WWE All Stars	Subdued Software	THQ	2011-03-29^{NA}	Unreleased	March 29, 2011	March 31, 2011	April 1, 2011
WWE SmackDown vs. Raw 2008	Yuke's	THQ	2007-11-09^{EU}	February 14, 2008	November 13, 2007	November 15, 2007	November 9, 2007
WWE SmackDown vs. Raw 2009	Yuke's	THQ	2008-11-06^{AUS}	Unreleased	November 9, 2008	November 6, 2008	November 7, 2008
WWE SmackDown vs. Raw 2010	Yuke's	THQ	2009-10-20^{NA}	Unreleased	October 20, 2009	October 22, 2009	October 23, 2009
WWE SmackDown vs. Raw 2011	Yuke's	THQ	2010-10-26^{NA}	Unreleased	October 26, 2010	October 28, 2010	October 29, 2010
WWII Aces	Arcade Moon	Destineer	2008-03-21^{NA}	Unreleased	March 21, 2008	Unreleased	Unreleased
The X Factor	Hydravision Entertainment	Deep Silver	2010-10-29^{EU}	Unreleased	Unreleased	Unreleased	October 29, 2010
X-Men: Destiny	Silicon Knights	Activision	2011-09-27^{NA}	Unreleased	September 27, 2011	October 26, 2011	October 14, 2011
X-Men Origins: Wolverine	Amaze Entertainment	Activision	2009-04-29^{AUS}	Unreleased	May 1, 2009	April 29, 2009	May 1, 2009
Xenoblade Chronicles	Monolith Soft	Nintendo	2010-06-10^{JP}	June 10, 2010	April 6, 2012	September 1, 2011	August 19, 2011
Yamaha Supercross	Beyond Reality Games	Zoo Digital Publishing^{EU} DSI Games^{NA} Funbox Media^{AUS}	2009-03-06^{EU}	Unreleased	March 10, 2009	October 22, 2009	March 6, 2009
Yatterman Wii: Bikkuri Dokkiri Machine de Takeshi Race da Koron	Takara Tomy	Takara Tomy	2008-12-11^{JP}	December 11, 2008	Unreleased	Unreleased	Unreleased
Yetisports: Penguin Party Island	Independent Arts Software	SevenOne Intermedia	2010-10-14^{EU}	Unreleased	Unreleased	Unreleased	October 14, 2010
Yoga	Trine Games	JoWooD Entertainment^{PAL} DreamCatcher Interactive^{NA}	2009-11-27^{EU}	Unreleased	December 1, 2009	January 21, 2010	November 27, 2009
Yogi Bear: The Video Game	Monkey Bar Games	D3 Publisher	2010-12-07^{NA}	Unreleased	December 7, 2010	Unreleased	January 28, 2011
You Don't Know Jack	Jellyvision Games; Iron Galaxy	THQ	2011-02-08^{NA}	Unreleased	February 8, 2011	Unreleased	Unreleased
Your Shape	Ubisoft Barcelona	Ubisoft	2009-11-24^{NA}	Unreleased	November 24, 2009	December 3, 2009	December 4, 2009
Yu-Gi-Oh! 5D's: Master of the Cards; Yu-Gi-Oh! 5D's: Duel Transer^{NA/JP}	Konami	Konami	2010-11-26^{EU}	April 21, 2011	December 7, 2010	Unreleased	November 26, 2010
Yu-Gi-Oh! 5D's: Wheelie Breakers	Konami	Konami	2009-03-26^{JP}	March 26, 2009	May 19, 2009	October 14, 2009	September 18, 2009
Zack & Wiki: Quest for Barbaros' Treasure	Capcom	Capcom	2007-10-23^{NA}	October 25, 2007	October 23, 2007	February 21, 2008	January 18, 2008
Zangeki no Reginleiv	Sandlot	Nintendo	2010-02-11^{JP}	February 11, 2010	Unreleased	Unreleased	Unreleased
Zenkoku Dekotora Matsuri	Suzak Inc.	Jaleco	2008-02-28^{JP}	February 28, 2008	Unreleased	Unreleased	Unreleased
Zero: Tsukihami no Kamen	Tecmo; Nintendo SPD; Grasshopper Manufacture	Nintendo	2008-07-31^{JP}	July 31, 2008	Unreleased	Unreleased	Unreleased
ZhuZhu Pets: Featuring The Wild Bunch	Black Lantern Studios	Activision	2010-10-12^{NA}	Unreleased	October 12, 2010	November 3, 2010	November 5, 2010
Zoo Hospital	Torus Games	Majesco	2008-09-22^{NA}	Unreleased	September 22, 2008	December 18, 2008	December 4, 2008
Zumba Fitness	Pipeworks Software	Majesco^{NA} 505 Games^{PAL}	2010-11-18^{NA}	Unreleased	November 18, 2010	March 24, 2011	April 1, 2011
Zumba Fitness 2	Zoë Mode	Majesco^{NA/AUS} 505 Games^{EU}	2011-11-15^{NA}	Unreleased	November 15, 2011	November 24, 2011	November 25, 2011
Zumba Fitness Core	Zoë Mode	Majesco^{NA/AUS} 505 Games^{EU}	2012-10-16^{NA}	Unreleased	October 16, 2012	November 15, 2012	November 9, 2012
Zumba Fitness: World Party	Zoë Mode	Majesco^{NA} 505 Games^{EU}	2013-11-05^{NA}	Unreleased	November 5, 2013	Unreleased	November 22, 2013
Zumba Kids	Zoë Mode	Majesco^{NA} 505 Games^{EU}	2013-11-19^{NA}	Unreleased	November 19, 2013	Unreleased	December 6, 2013

== Bundled games ==
The following games consist of two or more individually released games that were re-released onto a single disc afterwards.

List of Bundled Wii games
Title	Developer(s)	Publisher(s)	First released	Release date (NTSC)		Release date (PAL)	
Title	Developer(s)	Publisher(s)	First released	Japan	North America	Australasia	Europe
Chuck E. Cheese's Super Collection	UFO Interactive Games	UFO Interactive Games	2011-09-07^{NA}	Unreleased	September 7, 2011	Unreleased	Unreleased
Dragon Quest X All-In-One Package	Square Enix	Square Enix	2014-08-07^{JP}	August 7, 2014	Unreleased	Unreleased	Unreleased
Family Party: 90 Great Games Party Pack	Tamsoft	D3 Publisher	2010-11-02^{NA}	Unreleased	November 2, 2010	Unreleased	February 18, 2011
Hasbro Family Game Night Fun Pack	Virtuos	Electronic Arts	2011-11-01^{NA}	Unreleased	November 1, 2011	Unreleased	Unreleased
Hasbro Family Game Night Value Pack	EA Bright Light	Electronic Arts	2010-11-09^{NA}	Unreleased	November 9, 2010	Unreleased	Unreleased
I Spy Two Games in One	Gusto Games	Scholastic Corporation	2011^{NA}	Unreleased	2011	Unreleased	Unreleased
Mama's 2-Pack	Office Create; Cooking Mama Limited	Majesco^{NA} Nintendo^{KOR}	2012-08-14^{NA}	April 24, 2014	August 14, 2012	Unreleased	Unreleased
Metroid Prime: Trilogy	Retro Studios	Nintendo	2009-08-24^{NA}	Unreleased	August 24, 2009	October 15, 2009	September 4, 2009
Monopoly Collection	EA Bright Light; EA Salt Lake	Electronic Arts	2011-11-01^{NA}	Unreleased	November 1, 2011	Unreleased	November 4, 2011
Nerf N-Strike Double Blast Bundle	EA Salt Lake	Electronic Arts	2010-10-26^{NA}	Unreleased	October 26, 2010	Unreleased	Unreleased
Outdoor Action Double Pack	eV Interactive	Mastiff	2010-11-16^{NA}	Unreleased	November 16, 2010	Unreleased	Unreleased
Raving Rabbids Party Collection	Ubisoft Montpellier; Ubisoft Paris	Ubisoft	2010-08-27^{NA/EU}	Unreleased	August 27, 2010	September 9, 2010	August 27, 2010
Transformers: Ultimate Battle Edition	Next Level Games; Behaviour Interactive	Activision	2013-11-12^{NA}	Unreleased	November 12, 2013	Unreleased	November 15, 2013
Wii Sports + Wii Sports Resort	Nintendo EAD	Nintendo	2009-11-06^{EU}	Unreleased	October 28, 2012	December 1, 2011	November 6, 2009

== Applications ==
List of Wii applications
Title	Developer(s)	Publisher(s)	First released	Release date (NTSC)		Release date (PAL)	
Title	Developer(s)	Publisher(s)	First released	Japan	North America	Australasia	Europe
BBC iPlayer	BBC Media Applications Technologies Ltd	Nintendo	2009-11-18^{UK}	Unreleased	Unreleased	Unreleased	November 18, 2009
Check Mii Out Channel	Nintendo	Nintendo	2007-11-12^{WW}	November 12, 2007	November 12, 2007	November 12, 2007	November 12, 2007
Demae Channel	Denyusha	Nintendo	2009-05-01^{JP}	May 1, 2009	Unreleased	Unreleased	Unreleased
Digicam Print Channel	Nintendo; Fujifilm	Nintendo	2008-07-23^{JP}	July 23, 2008	Unreleased	Unreleased	Unreleased
Everybody Votes Channel	Nintendo	Nintendo	2007-02-13^{WW}	February 13, 2007	February 13, 2007	February 13, 2007	February 13, 2007
Forecast Channel	Nintendo	Nintendo	2006-12-19^{WW}	December 19, 2006	December 19, 2006	December 19, 2006	December 19, 2006
Internet Channel	Opera Software; Nintendo	Nintendo	2006-12-08^{WW}	December 8, 2006	December 8, 2006	December 8, 2006	December 8, 2006
Jam with the Band Live Channel	Nintendo SPD	Nintendo	2008-06-26^{JP}	June 26, 2008	Unreleased	September 9, 2009	May 21, 2010
Kirby TV Channel	Nintendo; HAL Laboratory	Nintendo	2011-06-23^{EU}	Unreleased	Unreleased	Unreleased	June 23, 2011
LoveFilm	LoveFilm	LoveFilm	2012-12-04^{EU}	Unreleased	Unreleased	Unreleased	December 4, 2012
Mario Kart Channel	Nintendo	Nintendo	2008-04-10^{JP}	April 10, 2008	April 27, 2008	April 24, 2008	April 11, 2008
Mii Channel	Nintendo	Nintendo	2006-11-19^{NA}	December 2, 2006	November 19, 2006	December 7, 2006	December 8, 2006
Minna no Theater Wii	FujiSoft	FujiSoft	2009-01-27^{JP}	January 27, 2009	Unreleased	Unreleased	Unreleased
News Channel	Nintendo	Nintendo	2007-01-27^{WW}	January 27, 2007	January 27, 2007	January 27, 2007	January 27, 2007
Nintendo Channel	Nintendo	Nintendo	2007-11-27^{JP}	November 27, 2007	May 7, 2008	May 30, 2008	May 30, 2008
Photo Channel	Nintendo	Nintendo	2006-11-19^{NA}	December 2, 2006	November 19, 2006	December 7, 2006	December 8, 2006
Rabbids Channel	Ubisoft Montpellier	Ubisoft	2009-11-01^{NA}	November 26, 2009	November 3, 2009	November 5, 2009	November 6, 2009
TV no Tomo Channel	Nintendo; HAL Laboratory	Nintendo	2008-03-04^{JP}	March 4, 2008	Unreleased	Unreleased	Unreleased
Today and Tomorrow Channel	Nintendo	Nintendo	2008-12-02^{JP}	December 2, 2008	Unreleased	September 9, 2009	September 9, 2009
Wii no Ma	Nintendo	Nintendo	2009-05-01^{JP}	May 1, 2009	Unreleased	Unreleased	Unreleased
Wii Fit Channel	Nintendo	Nintendo	2007-12-01^{JP}	December 1, 2007	May 19, 2008	May 8, 2008	April 25, 2008
Wii Fit Plus Channel	Nintendo	Nintendo	2009-10-01^{JP}	October 1, 2009	October 4, 2009	October 15, 2009	October 30, 2009
Wii Shop Channel	Nintendo	Nintendo	2006-11-19^{NA}	December 2, 2006	November 19, 2006	December 7, 2006	December 8, 2006

== See also ==
- List of best-selling Wii video games
