= Storm (2013 video game) =

2013 puzzle video game

- PlayStation 3 version's cover art
- Developer: Eko Software
- Publishers: IndiePub (PS3, X360); Neko Entertainment (PC)
- Producers: Laurence Nash; Tim Pham
- Designer: Neil Tekamp
- Platforms: PlayStation 3 Microsoft Windows; Xbox 360
- Release: Xbox 360 (XBLA): WW: June 14, 2013; PlayStation 3 (PSN): WW: June 18, 2013; Windows (Steam): WW: June 27, 2013
- Genre: Puzzle
- Mode: Single-player

Storm is a puzzle video game developed by Eko Software and published by Neko Entertainment for the Windows version, and IndiePub for the console versions. The game was released on June 14, 2013, for the Xbox 360, June 18, 2013, for the PlayStation 3, and June 27, 2013, for Microsoft Windows.

== Gameplay ==
In the game, players control a small seed-like character as they navigate through levels set in a world of wind, rain, and other natural elements. The primary objective of Storm is to manipulate the environment to guide the seed to its destination, often requiring players to solve intricate puzzles and overcome obstacles along the way.

The gameplay mechanics of Storm revolve around the manipulation of weather elements such as lightning and snow. Players can alter the direction and strength of the wind, create rain clouds to water plants and grow vegetation, and harness lightning to activate certain mechanisms.

Storm offers a non-linear approach to progression, allowing players to tackle levels in any order they choose. Players can discover new ways to interact with the environment and solve puzzles.

== Reception ==
Reception

Aggregate score
Aggregator	Score		
Aggregator	PC	PS3	Xbox 360
Metacritic	63/100	45/100	64/100

Review scores
Publication	Score		
Publication	PC	PS3	Xbox 360
4Players	73%	N/A	N/A
Eurogamer	7/10	N/A	7/10
GameRevolution	N/A	4/10	N/A
GamesMaster	N/A	N/A	4.4/10
Gamezebo	2.5/5	N/A	N/A
IGN	4/10	N/A	N/A
Jeuxvideo.com	14/20	N/A	N/A
Official Xbox Magazine (UK)	N/A	N/A	6/10
Official Xbox Magazine (US)	N/A	N/A	7/10
Gamereactor	N/A	N/A	6/10
PlayStation LifeStyle	N/A	3/5	N/A
Pure Xbox	N/A	N/A	5/10

The Xbox 360 and PC versions of Storm received "mixed or average" reviews, whereas the PlayStation 3 version of the game received "generally unfavorable" reviews according to review aggregator Metacritic.

Benjamin Schmädig for 4Players rated the game 73%, stating that "although I now find independent games based on physics puzzles to be a tiring trend, I really enjoyed experimenting with the elements of nature!"

Both Eurogamer Italy and Germany rated the game 7/10. the Italian version stated that "Storm is an interesting puzzler suitable for gamers in search of a relaxing, “new age” experience." The German version stated that "the first two thirds are a contemplative puzzler with dreamy art direction, beguiling music and sound effects you can turn off, should you so desire. It's a small idea, but one worth playing. Had the developers withstood the urge to go a bit overboard with the action in the last bits, this would have been a really great brain-teaser."

Pard Madrid for Gamereactor Sweden rated the game 6/10, stating that Storm is "not the perfect mixture between Braid and Flower we were hoping for." Kevin Schaller for GameRevolution rated the game 4/10, stating that "this concept behind Storm does have potential, but until it feels more controlled and less like an irritating crapshoot, I'm going to have to pass."

Matthew Sielaff for IGN rated the game 4/10, stating that "unfortunately, the frustrating aspects of Storm outweigh the enjoyable ones, and while it brings some interesting features to the table, there's not enough going on here to make me ever want to play this game again, or recommend it."
