= Maxine Clark =

American retailer

Maxine K. Clark
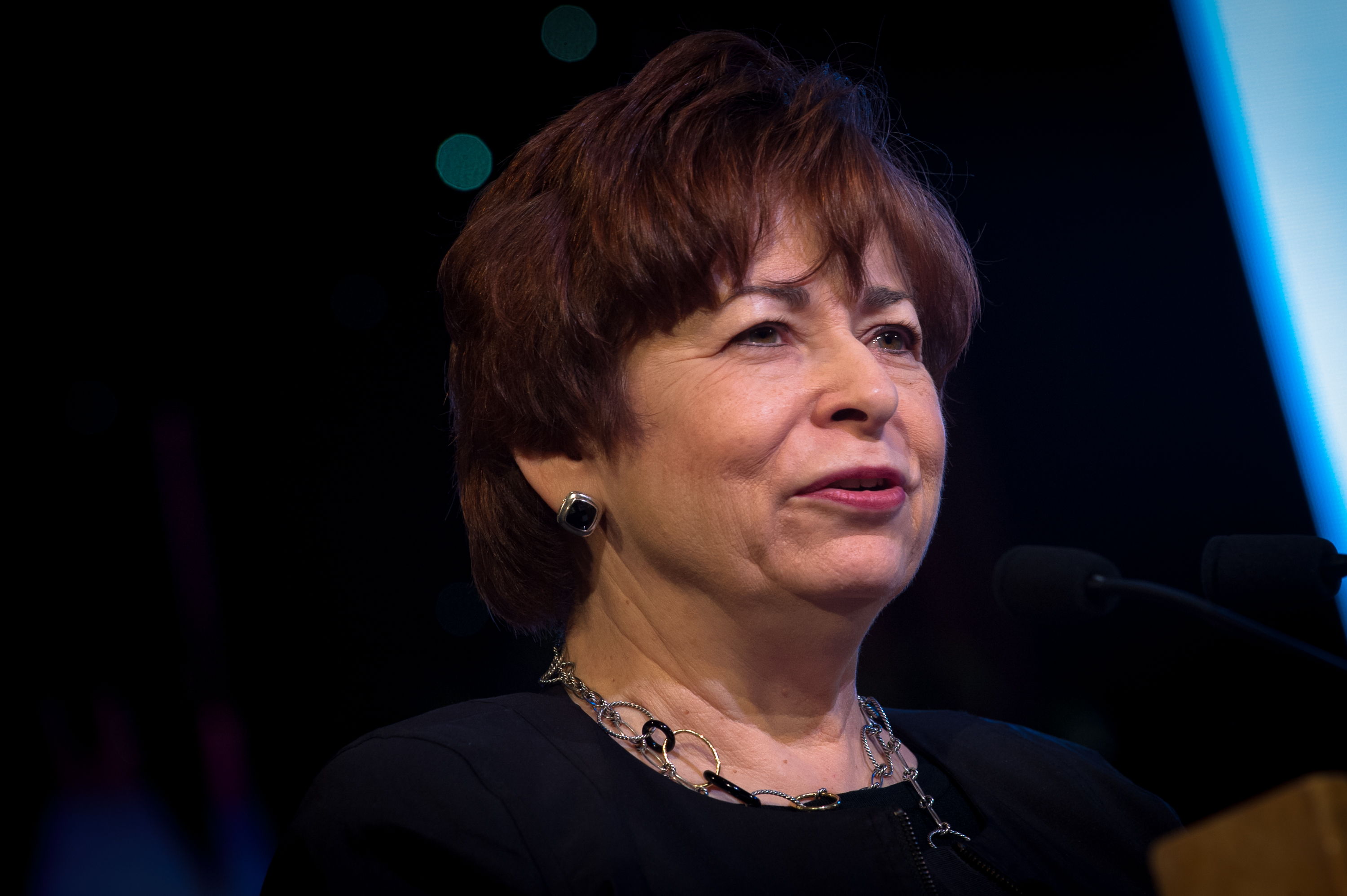
- Clark in 2014
- Born: Maxine Kasselman; March 6, 1949 (age 77); Coral Gables, Florida, U.S.
- Occupation: Founder of Build-A-Bear Workshop

Maxine Clark (née Kasselman, born March 6, 1949) is the founder and former CEO of Build-A-Bear Workshop, an American retailer that sells customizable teddy bears and other stuffed animals.

== Early life and education ==
Clark was born in Coral Gables, Florida, on March 6, 1949. She graduated from the University of Georgia in Athens, Georgia, in 1971 with a Bachelor of Arts in Journalism. She holds honorary Doctor of Laws degrees from Washington University in St. Louis and Saint Louis University School of Law, as well as a Doctor of Humane Letters in Education from the University of Missouri–St. Louis and an honorary associate degree from St. Louis Community College.

== Career ==
In 2006, she published her first book, The Bear Necessities of Business: Building a Company with Heart. After college, she worked at Hecht's, a division of the May Company department store chain, and in 1976 was promoted to the corporate offices in St. Louis, Missouri. In 1992, Clark became the president of Payless Shoe Source, and left the company in 1996.

In 1997, Clark founded Build-A-Bear Workshop after being inspired during a shopping trip by a friend's 10-year-old daughter when they couldn't find a Beanie Baby they were looking for. The girl commented that they could make the toy at home and that sparked Clark's idea to create a store to make stuffed animals. Nine months later, Build-A-Bear opened its flagship store at the St. Louis Galleria mall in October 1997 and issued an initial public offering in 2004 with 140 stores.

In 2013, Clark, retired from Build-A-Bear, turning over the CEO's role to Sharon Price John. Clark collected $1.37 million in total compensation in 2013, including a salary of $659,200, bonus and incentive pay totaling $377,138, and $144,365 in stock. She also received $160,415 for a six-month consulting contract plus $25,000 to cover her legal expenses.

Clark is a former member of the Board of Directors of Foot Locker. She has served on the boards of Operation Food Search, JCPenney and the Delmar DivINe, and is Co-Chair of the ReadyNation CEO Task Force on Early Childhood. Clark is a member of the Board of Directors and Executive Committee of Barnes-Jewish Hospital and its Goldfarb School of Nursing. She also serves on the national Board of PBS, where she holds the position of Vice Chair. Additionally, she is an Emeritus member of both the Nine PBS Board of Directors and the Board of Trustees of Washington University in St. Louis. Clark is a former board member of Parents as Teachers, and previously served on the national Board of Trustees of Teach For America.
