= Downstream Panic! =

2008 video game

Aqua Panic!
- Developer: Eko Software
- Publishers: WW: Atari SA (PSP); EU: Eko System (PSP); EU: Neko Entertainment (DS, Wii); NA: XS Games (DS, Wii); WW: Eko Software
- Platforms: PlayStation Portable, Wii, Nintendo DS, PlayStation 3 (PlayStation Network), Microsoft Windows, macOS, Linux
- Release: February 5, 2008: PSP; NA: February 5, 2008; AU: April 11, 2008; EU: April 8, 2010 Wii; EU: May 29, 2009; NA: September 25, 2009 DS; EU: October 6, 2009; NA: 2009 PlayStation 3; EU: April 8, 2010; NA: October 19, 2010 Windows, macOS, Linux November 9, 2015
- Genre: Puzzle
- Mode: Single-player

Downstream Panic! is a puzzle video game developed by Eko Software for PlayStation Portable in 2008. It was later renamed Aqua Panic and ported to Wii and Nintendo DS in 2009, PlayStation 3 in 2010, and Microsoft Windows, macOS, and Linux via Steam in 2015.

== Reception ==
Reception

Aggregate score
Aggregator	Score		
Aggregator	DS	PS3	PSP
Metacritic	N/A	68/100	77/100

Review scores
Publication	Score		
Publication	DS	PS3	PSP
1Up.com	N/A	N/A	B−
Eurogamer	N/A	7/10	N/A
Game Informer	N/A	N/A	8.5/10
GameDaily	N/A	N/A	8/10
GamePro	N/A	N/A	3.75/5
GameSpot	N/A	N/A	7.5/10
GameZone	N/A	N/A	8.5/10
IGN	N/A	N/A	8.3/10
Jeuxvideo.com	13/20	13/20	13/20
PlayStation Official Magazine – UK	N/A	7/10	N/A
Play	N/A	68%	N/A
PlayStation: The Official Magazine	N/A	N/A	2.5/5 stars
PSM3	N/A	65%	N/A

The PSP version received "generally favorable reviews", while the PlayStation 3 version received "average" reviews, according to the review aggregation website Metacritic.
