= Neko Entertainment =

French video game developer and publisher

- Company type: European Private Company
- Industry: video game publishing
- Founded: 1999
- Defunct: 2017
- Fate: Closed
- Headquarters: Montreuil, Seine-Saint-Denis, France
- Revenue: 862,000 (2014)
- Net income: −168,300 (2014)
- Number of employees: 11 (2014)
- Website: Neko Entertainment

Neko Entertainment was a French video game developer and publisher located in a suburb of Paris, France. It was founded in 1999. Neko's productions are based on an evolutionary development platform for 3D consoles called the Neko Game Development Kit which allows the company to simultaneously develop games across all platforms and to rapidly port existing games. The company's name is derived from the Japanese word for "cat" and their logo was an animated cat. The company ceased operations in May 2017.

Neko Entertainment developed games for the 3DS, Game Boy Advance, GameCube, Nintendo DS, PlayStation 2, PlayStation 3, PlayStation 4, PlayStation Portable, PlayStation Vita, Wii, Wii U, Windows, and Xbox 360.

== Games developed and published ==
Title	Developer	Publisher	Release date	Platforms
Charlie's Angels	Neko Entertainment	Ubisoft	2003	GameCube, PlayStation 2
Cocoto Platform Jumper	Neko Entertainment	BigBen Interactive	2004	GameCube, PlayStation 2, Windows, Wii
WWF Panda Junior	Neko Entertainment	SG Diffusion	2004	Windows
Cocoto Kart Racer	Neko Entertainment	BigBen Interactive, Conspiracy Entertainment	2005	Game Boy Advance, GameCube, Nintendo DS, PlayStation 2, Wii, Windows
Crazy Frog Racer	Neko Entertainment	Digital Jesters	2005	PlayStation 2, Windows
Super Army War	Neko Entertainment	Neko Entertainment	2005	Game Boy Advance
Cocoto Magic Circus	Neko Entertainment	BigBen Interactive	2006	GameCube, PlayStation 2, Wii
Franklin: A Birthday Surprise	Neko Entertainment	The Game Factory	2006	PlayStation 2, GameCube
Franklin's Great Adventures	Neko Entertainment	The Game Factory	2006	Game Boy Advance, Nintendo DS
Back to Stone	Hidden Floor	Neko Entertainment	2006	Game Boy Advance
Cocoto Tennis Master	Neko Entertainment	Bigben Interactive	2006	PlayStation 2
Arthur and the Invisibles	Neko Entertainment	Atari	2007	Nintendo DS
Build-A-Bear Workshop	Neko Entertainment	The Game Factory	2007	Nintendo DS
Cocoto Fishing Master	Neko Entertainment	BigBen Interactive	2007	PlayStation 2, WiiWare
Crazy Frog Racer 2	Neko Entertainment	Valcon Games, Digital Jesters	2007	PlayStation 2, Windows
Go West! A Lucky Luke Adventure	Neko Entertainment	Atari	2007	Nintendo DS
Heracles Chariot Racing	Neko Entertainment	Midas Interactive	2009	PlayStation 2, WiiWare, PlayStation Portable
Horse Life	Neko Entertainment/Yullaby	D3 Publisher Inc./505 Games	2007	Nintendo DS
Legend of the Dragon	Neko Entertainment	The Game Factory	2007	PlayStation 2, PlayStation Portable, Wii
Postman Pat and the Greendale Rocket	Neko Entertainment co-developed with Otaboo	The Game Factory	2007	Game Boy Advance
Bratz Kidz	Neko Entertainment	The Game Factory	2008	Nintendo DS, Wii
Bratz Kidz: Slumber Party	Neko Entertainment/EKO Software	The Game Factory	2008	Nintendo DS, Wii
Bratz Ponyz 2	Neko Entertainment	The Game Factory	2008	Nintendo DS
Code Lyoko: Quest for Infinity	Neko Entertainment	The Game Factory	2008	Wii, PlayStation 2, PlayStation Portable
Code Lyoko: Fall of XANA	Neko Entertainment/Yullaby	The Game Factory	2007	Nintendo DS
Garfield Lasagna World Tour	Neko Entertainment	Blast Entertainment Ltd.	2008	PlayStation 2
Horse Life 2	Yullaby/Neko Entertainment	Deep Silver	2008	PlayStation 2
Build-A-Bear Workshop: A Friend Fur All Seasons	Neko Entertainment	The Game Factory	2008	Wii
Cocoto Festival	Neko Entertainment/Kylotonn Entertainment	Bigben Interactive	2009	Wii
Cocoto Kit For Kids	Neko Entertainment/Tetraedge	Chilingo/Clickgamer	2009	iOS
Cocoto Surprise	Neko Entertainment	Bigben Interactive	2009	Wii
Cover Girl	Neko Entertainment	Ubisoft	2009	PlayStation Portable
Maestro! Jump in Music	Pastagames	Neko Entertainment	2009	Nintendo DS, iOS
Mad Tracks	Load inc.	Neko Entertainment	2009	Wii
Heracles: Battle With The Gods	Neko Entertainment	Midas Interactive Entertainment Ltd	2009	PlayStation 2, Nintendo DS, Windows
Cyberbike	Neko Entertainment/EKO Software	Bigben Interactive	2010	GameCube, PlayStation 2
DodoGo!	Neko Entertainment	Neko Entertainment	2010	Nintendo DS
Faceez	Neko Entertainment	Neko Entertainment	2010	DSiWare
Horse Life Adventures	Neko Entertainment	Valcon Games	2010	Wii, Nintendo DS, iOS, Android
Maestro! Green Groove	Pastagames	Bulkypix/Neko Entertainment	2010	iOS, DSiWare
Marvel Super Heroes 3D: Grandmaster's Challenge	Neko Entertainment	BigBen Interactive	2010	Wii
Delbo	Beyond Interactive	Neko Entertainment	2011	DSiWare
Cocoto Kart Racer 2	Neko Entertainment	BigBen Interactive	2011	Wii
Cocoto Alien Brick Breaker	Neko Entertainment	BigBen Interactive	2012	Nintendo 3DS
Puddle	Neko Entertainment	Konami	2012	Mac, Nintendo 3DS, WiiU, Linux, Ouya, PlayStation Vita, PlayStation 3, Windows, PlayStation 4, Microsoft Xbox 360, iOS, Android
Wooden Sen'SeY	UpperByte Studio	Neko Entertainment	2012	Mac, Windows, Wii U, Linux, Fuze Tomahawk F1
Cocoto Magic Circus 2	Bigben Interactive	Neko Entertainment	2013	Wii U
Imagine Championship Rider 3D	Neko Entertainment	Neko Entertainment	2013	Nintendo 3DS
Poöf vs. the Cursed Kitty	Arkedo Studio	Ubisoft	2013	Windows
The Mysterious Cities of Gold: Secret Paths	Neko Entertainment	Ynnis Interactive	2013	Nintendo 3DS, Wii U, Windows, iOS
Storm	EKO Software	Neko Entertainment	2013	Xbox 360, PS3, Windows
Tetrobot and Co.	Swing Swing Submarine/Neko Entertainment	Swing Swing Submarine	2013	Mac, Windows, Wii U, PlayStation 4, Linux
Kung Fu Rabbit	Neko Entertainment	Neko Entertainment	2013, 2014	Nintendo 3DS, PlayStation 3, PlayStation Vita, Wii U
Crouching Pony Hidden Dragon	Le Cortex	Neko Entertainment/The Game Atelier	2014	Windows
Gauge (video game)	Étienne Périn	Neko Entertainment/The Game Atelier	2014	Windows, iOS, Android
Pix the Cat	Pastagames	Pastagames//Focus Home Interactive/Neko Entertainment	2014	Windows, Vita, Xbox One, PlayStation 4
NekoBuro - Cats Block	FK Digital	Arc System Works/Neko Entertainment/Achtung!	2014	PlayStation Vita
Replay: VHS is Not Dead	Team Replay	Neko Entertainment	2015	Mac, Windows, Wii U, Xbox One, PlayStation 4
Californium	Darjeeling/Nova Production	ARTE France/Neko Entertainment	2016	Mac, Windows
HeartZ	Upper Byte	Neko Entertainment	2016	Windows, PlayStation Vita, PlayStation 4
