= Delbo (surname) =

Delbo or Del Bo is a surname. Notable people with the surname include:

- Charlotte Delbo (1913–1985), French writer and Auschwitz survivor
- Hedvig Delbo (1908–1944), Norwegian Gestapo agent
- Jean-Jacques Delbo (1909–1996), French actor
- José Delbo (1933–2024), Argentine comics artist
- Lisa del Bo (born 1961), Belgian singer
- Rinaldo Del Bo (1916–1991), Italian politician

== See also ==
- Delbo, a puzzle video game
- Del Bo Authority, the last High Authority of the European Coal and Steel Community
- Lea Del Bo Rossi (1903–1978), Italian medical researcher
- Mikkel Delbo Larsen (born 1985), Danish badminton player
- Palazzo del Bo, the historical seat of University of Padua since 1493
