= Zoo Entertainment =

Zoo Entertainment may refer to:

- Zoo Entertainment (record label), a defunct American record label
- Zoo Entertainment (video game company), an American video game company
