= Spray (video game) =

2008 video game

SPRay
- Developer: Eko Software
- Publisher: Tecmo
- Platform: Wii
- Release: NA: 3 December 2008
- Genre: Action-adventure

Spray (stylized as SPRay) is a video game developed by French studio Eko Software and published by Tecmo. It was released exclusively for the Wii in 2008.

== Gameplay ==
The player controls the Spirited Prince Ray, who can summon liquid-shooting spirits, hence the title SPRay. Besides water, Ray also has control over spirits that shoot oil, slime, anti-matter, and vomit. The player attacks enemies with Ray's sword and with the spirits, which are also used to solve environmental puzzles and give Ray special abilities. For example, slime lets the player stick to walls while vomit can reveal hidden platforms.

Tecmo also stated that the game also contains a number of multi-player mini-games.

== Reception ==
Reception

Aggregate score
Aggregator	Score
Metacritic	42/100

Review scores
Publication	Score
Game Informer	7/10
GameDaily	4/10
GamePro	1/5
GamesRadar+	1/5
GameTrailers	4.7/10
GameZone	5.8/10
IGN	5.6/10
NGamer	40%
Nintendo Power	3/10
Nintendo World Report	3/10
Common Sense Media	3/5

The game received "generally unfavorable reviews" according to the review aggregation website Metacritic. Nintendo Power criticized the game for an uncontrollable camera, poor controls and overall repetitiveness. IGN called it a "poor man's Legend of Zelda" with sloppy and apathetic presentation and uninspired gameplay.
