= The Plan (video game) =

2006 video game

Th3 Plan
- Developer: Eko Software
- Publishers: Microsoft Windows: EU: Monte Cristo; PlayStation 2: FRA: Monte Cristo; EU: Ghostlight; NA: Crave Entertainment
- Platforms: PlayStation 2 Microsoft Windows
- Release: Microsoft Windows: FRA: March 17, 2006; UK: March 31, 2006; PlayStation 2: EU: March 24, 2006; NA: April 17, 2007
- Genre: Action
- Mode: Single-player

The Plan (Note: Stylized as Th3 Plan) is a stealth action game developed by French studio Eko Software. The game was released in Europe for Microsoft Windows and PlayStation 2 in March 2006 and exclusively for PlayStation 2 in April 2007 in North America.

== Plot ==
Professional thieves Robert Taylor, Alan Siegel, and Stephen Foster are hired by the mafia to steal two Rembrandt paintings from a museum in exchange for an extremely valuable diamond. Foster brings his girlfriend, Valerie Carrera, along on the job. The team is able to get one of the paintings out, but the alarm is tripped in the process. Foster immediately flees in the getaway van with a shocked Valerie and the stolen painting, leaving Robert on the side of the road and Alan trapped inside the museum as the police close in. Robert manages to escape, but Alan is arrested.

Five years later, Robert visits Alan in prison and tells him about a plan to ruin Foster in revenge for abandoning them. Assisted by Valerie, Robert breaks Alan out of prison to join them on the job. The mafia refused to pay Foster for only one painting, and he has remained beholden to them until he delivers the second Rembrandt, currently housed in the Prague Museum of Art. Robert plans to steal the painting first, leaving Foster at the mercy of his employers. Robert, Alan, and Valerie board a luxury train in Prague, on which Foster is meeting his mafia contact to discuss the plan to rob the museum. The team copies Foster's intelligence on the museum and replaces the mafia's diamond with a fake. They are then forced to make a quick escape when Interpol agents board the train looking for Alan.

Foster's data indicates that he is planning to rob the museum in two weeks, forcing Robert's team to go after the painting first. Robert brings in three additional team members: hacker Bernie Stanton, demolitions expert Gary Willis, and close-combat specialist Martin Crane. Together, the six of them manage to break through the museum's security and escape with the painting. However, Foster intercepts the team during their getaway, holding them at gunpoint and stealing the painting before leaving them for the police. They are rescued by Nina Wilson, a sniper hired by Robert as insurance. The team regroups and Robert explains that he planned on Foster's interference and planted a tracking device on the painting so it could be followed to the location of the painting already in Foster's possession. This will enable the team to steal both paintings back, completely ruining Foster's reputation and forcing him into hiding from his own bosses.

The painting is tracked to a villa belonging to Foster, used as a front for transporting black market goods. Robert and Valerie enter the villa through the front door to meet with Foster and keep him busy. Meanwhile, the rest of the team infiltrates the villa's basement, steals the paintings, and plants enough explosives to destroy the building. As the team prepares to make their escape, the mafia figures out that their diamond has been stolen and sends men to attack the villa, believing that Foster is trying to rip them off. Most of the team escapes, but Robert is taken captive by Foster. With the explosives still counting down, Alan and Valerie re-enter the villa to save him. The two manage to rescue Robert, but Foster escapes. Robert gives chase and kills Foster in a gun battle before fleeing. The team watches the villa explode from afar. Robert explains that the mafia will likely want to cut a deal in exchange for the real diamond and the two paintings, and the team part ways.

== Gameplay ==
The gameplay is similar to a role-playing game, in which the player can interchange between the three main characters to play with and team up to complete the missions given. All three characters' perspectives are shown on the screen at the same time, with the character that the player is currently controlling taking up most of the screen.

== Reception ==
Reception

Aggregate score
Aggregator	Score
Metacritic	50/100

Review scores
Publication	Score
4Players	30/100
Eurogamer	3/10
GameSpot	4/10
GamesRadar+	2.5/5
GameZone	5.5/10
IGN	6.5/10
Jeuxvideo.com	PC: 7/20; PS2: 12/20
Joystick	3/10
Micromanía	154/200

The Plan received mixed to negative reviews from critics. On Metacritic, the PlayStation 2 version of the game has a score of 50/100 based on 12 reviews, indicating "mixed or average reviews".
