= Chrysler Classic Racing =

2008 video game

- Developer: Extra Mile Studios
- Publisher: Zoo Entertainment
- Platforms: Wii, Nintendo DS
- Release: NA: November 18, 2008
- Genre: Racing
- Modes: Single player, multiplayer

Chrysler Classic Racing is a racing game developed by British company Extra Mile Studios and published by Zoo Entertainment for the Wii and the Nintendo DS. It was released in North America on November 18, 2008. It is the first video game to exclusively feature Chrysler automobiles for the Wii and the Nintendo DS.

The game focuses on a story mode, in which the player, a nerd, attempts to become the coolest person in town by winning races with classic Chrysler vehicles. Chrysler Classic Racing garnered mediocre reviews from critics, who felt it had below average gameplay and excessively blatant advertising. As of 2010, Chrysler Classic Racing has received a 40.20% for its Wii version and a 33% for its DS version from review aggregation website GameRankings.

== Gameplay ==
The player drives a car on a dirt path in the Wii version.

In Chrysler Classic Racing, the player races classic Chrysler cars on various tracks. The main portion of the game is found in the story mode, where the player selects from one of four nerds, and after seeing a cool person driving a Chrysler car, decides to race to the top and become cool themselves. The car selection features Chrysler cars from the 1950s through the 1970s. Races mostly feature standard Wii controls, and require use of the Wii Remote nunchuk attachment. The Nintendo DS version uses the D-Pad and not the touch screen in order to control movement. Once a player has completed a track in story mode, they can then replay the track as many times as they want to outside the story mode; the game allows the player to set a "mirror mode", which reverses the track to give the player a new experience.

After completing races, players must play one of three different minigames: "Be my Baby", "Gauntlet Challenges", and "Kings Challenges". In "Be my Baby", the player must collect teddy bears from a top-down perspective in order to impress women, while in the other two challenges, the player must race rivals in order to collect "cool points" and cash.

== Reception ==
Chrysler Classic Racing garnered mediocre reviews from critics, who felt it had below average gameplay and excessively blatant advertising; it has received a 40.20% for its Wii version and a 33% for its DS version from review aggregation website GameRankings. IGN's Adam Ballard stated, "... Chrysler Classic Racing is basically one giant, terrible commercial." He criticized most aspects of the game, feeling that it was lazily put together. In his review of the Nintendo DS version of the game, Adam Ballard described it as a "weak driving experience with shoddy artwork." GameZone described the vehicle designs as "terrible", and lambasted the laziness that had gone into the game's control scheme.
