= Rugby 18 =

2017 video game

- Developer: Eko Software
- Publisher: Bigben Interactive
- Platforms: PlayStation 4; Windows; Xbox One
- Release: 27 October 2017
- Genres: Sports, simulation
- Modes: Single-player, multiplayer

Rugby 18 is a rugby union simulation video game developed by Eko Software and published by Bigben Interactive. It was released on 27 October 2017 for PlayStation 4, Windows and Xbox One. The game served as a sequel to Rugby 15 and was succeeded by Rugby 20.

== Development and release ==
On 23 May 2017, Bigben Interactive and Eko Software first announced Rugby 18. The game was initially scheduled for an October release on PlayStation 4, Windows and Xbox One. The reveal trailer was shown in June 2017. Rugby 18 launched on all platforms on 27 October 2017.

== Commentary ==
Rugby 18 features two commentators, Ben Kay and Nick Mullins. Mullins is a sports commentator, primarily for BT Sport, whilst Kay is a former rugby union player.

== Reception ==
Reception

Aggregate score
Aggregator	Score
Metacritic	(PS4) 41/100 (XONE) 56/100

Review scores
Publication	Score
GamesRadar+	1/5
Push Square	4/10
PlayStation Universe	6.5/10

Rugby 18 received "generally unfavourable" reviews from critics on PlayStation 4 whilst it received "mixed or average" reviews from critics on Xbox One, according to review aggregator site Metacritic.

GamesRadar+ was highly critical of the game, rating it 1/5, and wrote: "Rugby 18 is a dire simulation of the sport, with a paper-thin selection of modes, and relentlessly poor presentation." Push Square criticised the lack of modes and "dismal" presentation, rating it 4/10, and stated that "at full-price Bigben is demanding an obscene amount of money for a game that feels years behind where it should be." PlayStation Universe rated the game 6.5/10, and stated that it is the best available rugby union game on PlayStation 4 despite not being the definitive version the console needed, and was also critical of the presentation.
