= Glisten and the Merry Mission =

2023 film by Cory Morrison

- Theatrical release poster
- Directed by: Cory Morrison
- Screenplay by: Temple Mathews; Sharon Price John
- Produced by: Patrick Hughes
- Starring: Julia Michaels; Trinity Bliss; Freddie Prinze Jr.; Billy Ray Cyrus; Michael Rapaport; Dionne Warwick; Leona Lewis; Chevy Chase
- Edited by: Cory Morrison
- Music by: Meiro Stamm; Antonio Naranjo
- Production companies: Build-A-Bear Entertainment; Foundation Media Partners
- Distributed by: Samuel Goldwyn Films
- Release date: November 3, 2023
- Running time: 78 minutes
- Country: United States
- Language: English

Glisten and the Merry Mission is a 2023 American animated Christmas adventure film written by Temple Mathews and Sharon Price John, directed by Cory Morrison, and featuring the voices of Julia Michaels in her film debut, Trinity Bliss, Freddie Prinze Jr., Billy Ray Cyrus, Michael Rapaport, Dionne Warwick, Leona Lewis and Chevy Chase. Produced by Build-A-Bear Entertainment and Foundation Media Partners, the film was animated by Big Jump Entertainment and released on November 3, 2023.

== Cast ==
- Trinity Bliss as Marzipan
- Julia Michaels as Cinnameg
- Freddie Prinze Jr. as Crumble Starsnaps
- Morgan Simianer as Estrellastar
- Billy Ray Cyrus as Donner
- Jim Conroy as Blitzen, Dasher, and lead wolf
- Natalie Polissom as Cupid, Sparkleplum and oldest elfling
- McKenna Bray as Snowangel
- Harvey Russell as Cookiebar
- Patrick Hughes as Tinseltoes
- Troy Hall as Winter Wishes Moose
- Tim Johnson Jr. as Edgar
- Reginald VelJohnson as Snow Owl
- Michael Rapaport as Grizz
- Dionne Warwick as Sage Evergreen
- Chester Rushing as Comet and older elfling
- Amy Wilson as Vixen
- Jeff Timmons as Jinglestar
- Michael D. Cohen as Snowman
- Chevy Chase as Santa
- Sisanie Villaclara as Tough girl wolf
- Leona Lewis as Glisten

== Release ==
The film was released exclusively at Cinemark Theatres on November 3, 2023.

== Reception ==
Jeffrey M. Anderson of Common Sense Media awarded the film three stars out of five.
