= Capsized (video game) =

Science-fiction platform video game

- Developer: Alientrap
- Publishers: Alientrap indiePub (iOS); Namco Bandai Games (X360)
- Programmer: Lee Vermeulen
- Artist: Jesse McGibney
- Composer: Solar Fields
- Platforms: Windows, iOS, Linux, OS X, Xbox 360
- Release: Windows; April 29, 2011 iOS; February 13, 2013; Xbox Live Arcade; July 5, 2013; Linux; October 23, 2013; OS X April 21, 2015
- Genres: Platform, run and gun
- Modes: Single-player, multiplayer

Capsized is a science fiction-themed platform game with run and gun mechanics. It was developed by Alientrap.

== Development and release ==
Capsized was released for Microsoft Windows on April 29, 2011, on Steam. The iOS version, called Capsized+, was available February 13, 2013, and published by IndiePub. The soundtrack is provided by Solar Fields; the ambient electronic music is from his 2009 album Movements. The game was also released for Xbox Live Arcade on July 5, 2013, and was supposed to be released at a later time for the PlayStation 3's PlayStation Network, however this was canceled.

== Reception ==
Reception

Aggregate score
Aggregator	Score
Metacritic	(iOS) 83/100 (PC) 80/100 (X360) 74/100

Review scores
Publication	Score
Edge	(PC) 8/10
Eurogamer	(PC) 8/10
GameRevolution	(X360) 9/10
GameSpot	(PC) 8/10
GameTrailers	(X360) 8.3/10
Gamezebo	(PC) 4/5
GameZone	(X360) 7/10
IGN	(PC) 8.5/10
Jeuxvideo.com	(PC) 15/20
MacLife	(iOS) 4/5
Official Xbox Magazine (US)	(X360) 6.5/10
PC Gamer (UK)	(PC) 86%
Metro	(X360) 7/10

The PC version and Capsized+ received "generally favorable" reviews, while the Xbox 360 version received "mixed or average reviews", according to the review aggregation website Metacritic. Official Xbox Magazine gave the Xbox 360 a mixed review while it was still in development a year-and-a-half before its release date.
