= SuperVillain Studios =

Video game development company

- Type: Subsidiary
- Industry: Video games
- Founded: January 2004
- Headquarters: Irvine, California
- Key people: Owners; Steve Ganem; Chris Rausch
- Products: Games for video game consoles
- Number of employees: 13
- Parent: Nicalis (2017–present)

SuperVillain Studios is an American video game development company that develops for the Wii, Nintendo DS, Xbox, Xbox 360, PlayStation 2, PlayStation 3, PlayStation 4, and PlayStation Portable.

== Company profile ==
SuperVillain Studios (SVS) was founded in January 2004 by Tim Campbell, Steve Ganem and Chris Rausch in Costa Mesa, CA. The original team consisted of six members, whose first duties were levels and online programming for Tony Hawk's Underground 2, which was primarily developed by Neversoft. The team grew steadily through steady contracts with Activision, eventually developing the original title, Dungeon Siege: Throne of Agony, on the PSP for 2K Games. The title was built using the company's internally developed cross-platform engine, Automaton, which is known for its versatility. Automaton was also used to develop Fat Princess: Fistful of Cake and flOw PSP for Sony Computer Entertainment and Order Up! (Wii) for Zoo Games.

According to the company website, "...SuperVillain Studios was founded on the belief that the key to developing outstanding video games is to combine talented developers with a creative and fulfilling environment." SuperVillain Studios is composed of a group of veteran game developers from companies such as Blizzard Entertainment, Neversoft Entertainment, Westwood Studios, EA, Interplay, Troika, and Point of View. SuperVillain Studios intends to create games that appeal to both the mass market and hard-core gamers.

SuperVillain Studios developed one original IP for the Wii, named "Order Up!". The game was later upgraded and published as "Order Up!!" on PSN and 3DS eShop before being re-designed for mobile and released as the highly successful "Order Up!! To Go" on iOS and Android.

In 2012, SuperVillain published their first Steam game, "Tower Wars" - a competitive, multiplayer Tower Defense game that added innovative offensive mechanics to the traditionally defense-only genre.

At the end of 2013, SVS returned to their console roots in developing "flOw" for PS4's launch and for PS Vita.

2014 saw a boost in mobile production from the studio. They developed "Record Run" with Harmonix Music Systems, "Order Up!! Fast Food", "Glacier Rush" and published "Choco Dozer" before launching "Transworld Endless Skater" in July.

In 2017, Nicalis announced that they had acquired the studio, alongside Cowboy Color.

== Co-developments ==
- Tony Hawk's Underground 2 (PS2/Xbox)
- GUN (Xbox)
- X-Men Legends 2: Rise of Apocalypse (PS2/Xbox/GC/PC)
- Tony Hawk's American Wasteland (PS2/Xbox)
- Record Run (iOS/Android)

== Games ==
- Tony Hawk's Underground 2: Remix (PSP)
- Dungeon Siege: Throne of Agony (PSP)
- Tony Hawk's Downhill Jam (PS2)
- Crash of the Titans (PSP)
- flOw Expansion Pack (PS3)
- flOw (PSP)
- Fat Princess: Fistful of Cake (PSP)
- Order Up! (Wii)
- Order Up!! (PS3/3DS)
- Order Up!! To Go (iOS/Android)
- Order Up!! Food Truck Wars (iOS/Android)
- Tron: Evolution (PSP)
- Tower Wars (PC/Mac)
- Sushi Pop (iOS/Android)
- Flow (Android/Vita/PS4)
- Order Up!! Fast Food (iOS)
- Choco Dozer (iOS/Android)
- Glacier Rush (iOS/Android)
- Endless Skater (PC)
- Transworld Endless Skater (iOS/Android)
