= Cocoto Kart Racer =

2005 video game

- Developer: Neko Entertainment
- Publishers: Conspiracy Entertainment; BigBen Interactive
- Composer: Raphaël Gesqua
- Platforms: PlayStation 2, GameCube, Wii, Nintendo DS, Game Boy Advance, Microsoft Windows, iOS, Android
- Release: PlayStation 2: PAL: March 2, 2005; GameCube: PAL: April 22, 2005; Windows: PAL: July 21, 2006; Game Boy Advance: PAL: 2006; Nintendo DS: NA: September 25, 2007; PAL: 2007; Wii: NA: June 24, 2008; PAL: ("sequel") November 30, 2011; iOS/Android: WW: 2009
- Genre: Racing
- Modes: Single-player, multiplayer

Cocoto Kart Racer is a kart-racing game released by Neko Entertainment between 2005 and 2009 on major platforms. The original Wii Edition was exclusive to North America and a "sequel" was released on Wii for PAL regions in 2011, but Cocoto Kart Racer 2 is just a revision of the first game branded as a sequel. The only difference is support for the Wii Wheel, a.k.a. tilting the Wii Remote to steer, whereas the original release required the Nunchuck.

== Gameplay ==
The game includes eight drivers and four secret drivers (though only 5 are featured on the case) each with their own handling.

The drivers are called Cocoto, Baggy, Turtini, Geckill, Scritch, Duggil, Shiny, & Neuro.

== Release ==
The game was first released in Europe in 2005 for the PS2 and GameCube. It was published by BigBen Interactive The game was later published in 2007 by Midway Games in Europe, Kemco in Japan, and Conspiracy Entertainment in the US on the Nintendo DS. The Wii versions were published once again by BigBen and Conspiracy in 2008.

== Consoles ==
Cocoto Kart Racer was released for the GameCube, PlayStation 2, Game Boy Advance, PC and finally DS. The Game Boy Advance and DS ports are different games.
