= Maestro! Jump in Music =

2009 video game

- Developers: Pastagames, Neko Entertainment
- Publisher: BigBen Interactive
- Platforms: Nintendo DS, DSiWare, iOS
- Release: Nintendo DS: EU: November 6, 2009; NA: June 28, 2010 (DSi); iOS; March 6, 2010
- Genre: Rhythm action/Platformer
- Mode: Single-player

Maestro! Jump In Music is a rhythm action game for the Nintendo DS and iPhone OS. It is published by BigBen Interactive and developed by French studios Pastagames and Neko Entertainment. The game was released for the Nintendo DS in Europe on November 6, 2009. The first world of the original retail title was released as a standalone app titled Maestro! Green Groove for iPhone OS on March 6, 2010 and on DSiWare on June 28.

== Plot ==
In a world filled with music, a songbird named Presto and a spider named Staccato catch the eye of Bella Bellissima, who eventually falls for Presto's soothing voice over Staccato's guitar playing. Heartbroken, Staccato creates a smog that spreads across the world and causes everyone to become mute. Presto must search for the lost sounds and beat Staccato to return music to the world.

== Gameplay ==
Maestro! features a mix of rhythm action gameplay and platforming. During each level, Presto walks across a line of strings. By pulling down the string with the stylus, Presto will jump up (provided he is standing on it), while pulling it up will cause Presto to drop to another level. This is generally used as a means of changing paths in order to collect items that add to the beat. Certain strings will have stringing glows around them, requiring the player to pluck it in time to the music. As the levels progress, new elements are added, such as enemies that must be tapped in time to the music, mandolinas that require repeated rubbing, and vortexes that carry Presto across large gaps. Every action in the game makes a sound. Players need to beat a certain rank to progress onto the next level. Getting several gold notes in a row causes birds to appear and protect Presto, while making mistakes causes them to disappear and makes red notes appear. The level ends if too many red notes appear on screen. After every four levels, players play a Simon Says style boss level, in which players must repeat drum taps and string plucks to whither down the opponent's health. The game ends if players make three mistakes in a row. Once Easy mode is completed, Normal and Hard mode (which feature full length tracks) are unlocked, as well as Tracklist and Freeplay options, where players can replay any completed levels. Players can also optionally play using the microphone.

== Music ==
The game features 24 songs:

- Ludwig van Beethoven - Symphony No. 5
- Antonín Dvořák - New World Symphony
- Madness - Our House
- Traditional Japanese song - Sakura Sakura
- Johann Sebastian Bach - Little Fugue
- Wolfgang Amadeus Mozart - A Little Night Music
- Perren, Mizell et al. - ABC
- Traditional French song - Vent Frais, Vent du Matin
- Eduardo di Capua - 'O Sole Mio
- The Animals - The House of the Rising Sun
- Antonio Lucio Vivaldi - The Four Seasons
- Traditional English song - Greensleeves
- Erik Satie - Gymnopédies No. 1
- Pyotr Tchaikovsky - Sugar Plum Fairy
- Screamin' Jay Hawkins - I Put a Spell on You
- Traditional Russian song - Otchi-Tchor-Ni-Ya
- Johannes Brahms - Hungarian Dances
- Edvard Grieg - Peer Gynt
- Leonard Bernstein - The Magnificent Seven
- Traditional song adapted for Georges Bizet's Carmen - El Arreglito
- Michael Gore, Dean Pitchford - Fame
- Ennio Morricone - The Good, the Bad and the Ugly
- Isaac Albéniz - Asturias
- American Traditional song - When the Saints Go Marching In

=== iPod exclusive songs ===
The following songs only appear in the chapters released for iPhone OS:

- Frédéric Chopin - Nocturne No. 2 Opus 9

== Reception ==
Official Nintendo Magazine gave the game 85%, praising its high replay value. NGamer gave the game 81%, saying its creativity and charm makes up for the lack of finesse compared to big titles. Eurogamer gave the game 7/10, citing it as a good rhythm game, but criticising odd structuring, such as Normal mode needing to be unlocked by completing Easy first. Tiny Cartridge cited the game as "the most interesting DS import this year".
