= Warhammer: Chaosbane =

2019 video game

- Developer: Eko Software
- Publisher: Bigben Interactive
- Director: Jean-Georges Levieux
- Designers: Franck Delfortrie, Brice Poncet
- Programmers: Joel Grégroire, Jérémy Lafontaine
- Artist: Eric Chantreau
- Writer: Mike Lee
- Composer: Chance Thomas
- Platforms: Microsoft Windows; PlayStation 4; Xbox One; Xbox Series X/S; PlayStation 5
- Release: Windows, PS4, Xbox One: WW: 4 June 2019; Xbox Series X/S: WW: 10 November 2020; PlayStation 5: NA/OC: 12 November 2020; WW: 19 November 2020
- Genre: Action role-playing
- Modes: Single-player, multiplayer

Warhammer: Chaosbane is an action role-playing game developed by Eko Software and published by Bigben Interactive. It was released for Microsoft Windows, PlayStation 4, and Xbox One on 4 June 2019. Players choose to play as one of six character classes from the Warhammer Fantasy setting: a human soldier of the Empire, a High Elf mage, a Dwarf slayer, a Wood Elf scout, a Dwarf engineer, or a human witch hunter. The character must help save the Empire against the daemons of Chaos. Downloadable content featuring a storyline around the undead Tomb Kings was released on 16 December 2019. An enhanced version of the game was released for Xbox Series X/S on 10 November 2020 and for PlayStation 5 on 12 November 2020.

== Setting ==
Chaosbane is set just after the "Great War Against Chaos", two hundred years prior to the setting of Warhammer Fantasy. The player character is a personal champion of Magnus the Pious, slayer of the Chaos Everchosen Asavar Kul, and soon to become Emperor of the fractured Empire. The player selects one of six characters with their own unique skill sets. Four were included with the base game: Konrad Vollen, an Empire Soldier (specializing in sword and shield); Prince Elontir of Ulthuan, an exiled High Elf Archmage (specializing in magic); Bragi Axebiter, a Dwarf Slayer (specializing in twin-weapon melee); and Elessa, a Wood Elf Waywatcher (specializing in archery). Two more characters - Keela Gunnarsdottir, a Dwarf Engineer (using firearms and technology), and Jurgen Heider, an Imperial Witch Hunter (using pistols and blades) - were added in DLCs.

=== Main Campaign ===
A Chaos sorceress and her cultists enter Magnus' tower in the Imperial city of Nuln, and places him under a curse. The player character is initially accused of the crime by Heinrich Voss, Magnus' chief witch hunter, before the High Elven archmage Teclis, High Loremaster of Hoeth, intervenes. Fearing the Empire's collapse if Magnus dies, Teclis tasks the player with hunting down a cult dedicated to Nurgle, the Chaos God of disease and decay, in Nuln's sewers. The player confronts the cult's leader, Friedrich Kessler, who gloats that the "Harbinger", the sorceress who cursed Magnus, had promised to help him become the successor to Asavar Kul. However, he is instead sacrificed to summon the Great Unclean One, the Greater Daemon of Nurgle.

Voss reports that Uthgrim Redaxe, a Champion of Khorne, the Chaos God of war, has surfaced at the city of Praag in Kislev, which had fallen to Chaos during the war with Asavar Kul. Using a magical waystone, Voss, Teclis, and the player teleport to the outskirts of Praag. The player fights through Praag's warped streets and into the halls of Redaxe's citadel, the Tower of Skulls, only to find he has escaped to summon the Bloodthirster, the Greater Daemon of Khorne. Before his death, Redaxe reveals that the Harbinger made the same offer she made to Kessler, which he refused, and that the Harbinger had gone to seek out Vigrun Skraeling, a Champion of Slaanesh, the Chaos God of excess.

Vigrun had served in Asavar Kul's army, and fled to the Forest of Knives in the frozen wastes of Norsca after Kul fell. In the ruined Elven city in the forest, the player seeks out scholar Waldo Erlanger, who was captured by Vigrun's men. Erlanger aids the player in locating the key to the secret entrance of the ruined temple where Vigrun is based. Entering the temple, Vigrun reveals that the "Harbinger" is Helspeth Bale, a native of Nuln. As with Kessler and Redaxe, Vigrun is sacrificed to summon his patron god's Greater Daemon, the Keeper of Secrets. After the Daemon is defeated, "Erlanger" reveals himself to be Helspeth, a powerful Sorceress of Tzeentch, the Chaos God of magic and deception. She teleports away, taking Voss with her. Teclis suspects that Helspeth used the player to eliminate her potential rivals, and has collected their artifacts - the Eye of Argoth from Kessler, Redaxe's battleaxe, and Vigrun's gauntlet - which had been claimed by Voss.

Returning to Nuln, Teclis dispatches the player into Tzeentch's domain within the Realms of Chaos, where Helspeth hides in a fortress guarded by the Daemon Prince Axarath the Desecrator. After traversing the fortress' winding pathways and breaching its defenses, the player destroys the Fane of Forbidden Secrets, source of Axarath's power, and defeats the Daemon Prince. With the way open, the player enters Helspeth's tower, a twisted reflection of Magnus' tower in Nuln. Within the Harbinger's sanctum, they discover that Helspeth is in fact Voss' sister, and that she has orchestrated events to take possession of Magnus in order to rule the Empire. Voss, deceived into thinking Helspeth would make him Asavar Kul's successor, mortally wounds her; in her last act, she uses both of their bodies to summon Tzeentch's Greater Daemon, the Lord of Change, which is then defeated. With Helspeth dead, the curse is broken, and Magnus is proclaimed the new Emperor.

=== The Tomb Kings ===
Following the Great War, Emperor Magnus recognized the need for the Empire to have mages of its own, and with the aid of Teclis established the Colleges of Magic in Altdorf. The player is dispatched by one of the colleges, the Amethyst Order (dedicated to the study of death), to link up with an expedition in Nehekhara, the Land of the Dead. Arriving at the expedition's base camp outside the ruined city of Bel Aliad, the player meets expedition leader Professor Johannes Dürer and his assistant Margritte, who are working to discover a way to open the crypt of King Nebmakhet, Bel Aliad's ancient ruler. Given the ancient Nehekharans' obsession with death and the afterlife, Dürer believes that secrets to their Mortuary Cult (as well as considerable treasure) can be found inside Nebmakhet's largely-intact tomb. With the aid of Margritte, the player is able to open Nebmakhet's tomb, allowing the professor to study the artifacts within. However, that night, Nebmakhet's undead soldiers attack the camp, and Dürer disappears.

Tracking the professor to a temple near the camp, the player discovers that Dürer is pursuing his own agenda. Dying from exposure to warpstone (a powerful magical mineral said to be the power of Chaos given form), he seeks the Elixir of Life created by Nagash, the first necromancer; Nagash's corrupt rituals destroyed Nehekhara, raising its inhabitants as the undead. Dürer awakens Nebmakhet from his crypt, offering his services in exchange for the secrets of Nagash's power, not realizing that the Tomb Kings curse Nagash as "the Usurper". Nebmakhet scours the flesh from Dürer's bones, forcing the player and Margritte to flee. However, Margritte warns that Nebmakhet will torture Dürer's spirit and learn what he knows, then invade the Empire with his undead legions. To create a spell to weaken Nebmakhet, Margritte directs the player to find scrolls of power from the temple of Usirian, the Nehekharan god of the underworld, and an amulet from a high priest of Djaf, the god of death. The player confronts Nebmakhet in his tomb and defeats him, but Nagash's curse allows for his future return. Margritte and the remainder of the expedition restore Nebmakhet's relics to their proper place and return to Altdorf.

=== The Forges of Nuln ===
Master Falke, an engineer of the Imperial Gunnery School in Nuln, warns the player of strange happenings within the facility; it has been sealed shut due to a supposed outbreak of plague, but its forges are running for the first time in years. After rescuing a number of engineers from inside, the player learns that Gustav Reichert, the school's headmaster, has sworn himself to Nurgle and is using the forges to create new weapons for his dark master. The Gunnery School was given schematics to steam-powered tanks by the Dwarfs, and Reichert is building copies to infuse with Nurgle's power. The player sabotages the forges and destroys the steam engines powering the Chaos tanks. Reichert is killed in the explosion and Falke becomes the new headmaster of the Gunnery School, swearing to rebuild it in the service of the Empire.

== Reception ==
Reception

Aggregate score
Aggregator	Score
Metacritic	(PC) 69/100 (PS4) 63/100 (XONE) 73/100 (XSX) 76/100 (PS5) 67/100

Review scores
Publication	Score
IGN	8.7/10
PC Gamer (US)	58/100
PCGamesN	7/10
Push Square	5/10
Shacknews	9/10
The Games Machine (Italy)	8/10

Warhammer: Chaosbane received "mixed or average" reviews for Microsoft Windows, PlayStation 4, Xbox One, and PlayStation 5, and "generally positive" reviews for Xbox Series X/S, according to review aggregator website Metacritic.

Writing for IGN, Leana Hafer gave the game an 8.7 out of 10, writing, "This action-RPG has it where it counts, with fun classes, good boss fights, and a decent loot system. It trips up on presentation in some places, including some terrible voice acting, but it manages to get the feel of Games Workshop’s dark fantasy setting right." PC Gamer and Push Square compared the title unfavorably to Diablo III while criticizing its dull combat, uninteresting loot, repetitive content, and lack of innovation. Iain Harris of PCGamesN called the game "...an endearing celebration of its influences", and praised the Warhammer references, streamlined character progression, and power fantasy experience. Shacknews' Greg Burke gave the title a 9 out of 10 and heavily praised Chaosbane's co-op integration, attention to detail, frantic combat, and an expansive endgame.
