= Back to Stone =

2006 video game

- North American box art
- Developer(s): Hidden Floor
- Publisher(s): EU: Neko Entertainment / Big Ben Interactive; NA: Graffiti Entertainment / O~3 Entertainment
- Producer(s)
- Programmer(s)
- Composer(s): Frédéric Motte
- Platform(s): Game Boy Advance
- Release: December 14, 2006
- Genre(s): Action role-playing
- Mode(s): Single-player

Back to Stone is an action role-playing game using an isometric 3D perspective developed by French studio Hidden Floor. It was published by Neko Entertainment / Big Ben Interactive in Europe and by Graffiti Entertainment / O~3 Entertainment in North America. It was released for the Game Boy Advance in 2006.

== Gameplay ==
The player controls a warrior who is mysteriously amnesiac and has been experimented on by demonic creatures. Players can move the character around the game's environments freely, jump around platforms, and fight enemies dynamically. Killed enemies turn to stone, which can then be moved around and used to solve puzzles. When the player's character is wounded, he transforms into a demonic monster, which improves his fighting capabilities.

The game does not feature any way to save the player's progress, which had been a standard feature of video games for many years by 2006. Instead, the game relies on passwords to allow the player to return to the game where they had left off when they last turned off the console.

== Reception ==
Reception

Aggregate score
Aggregator	Score
Metacritic	55/100

Review scores
Publication	Score
GameSpot	5.5/10
GameZone	6.8/10
Jeuxvideo.com	14/20
Joypad	6/10

The game received "mixed or average" reviews, according to the review aggregation website Metacritic. Most critics considered the gameplay to be "simple" and "familiar", but the stone-pushing puzzles to be "unimaginative", unoriginal, and repetitive.

Some reviewers considered the graphics and design to be "charming and varied", easy to discern (in contrast to Banjo-Kazooie: Grunty's Revenge), but many judged the presentation to be "drab", "grainy" and "muddy". The game's smooth framerate and special effects have received praise, as have the intricate boss battles.

Several reviewers have noted that controlling the character from the game's isometric 3D perspective was very difficult and "unintuitive" because of the rigidity of a directional pad and the difficulty in judging depth. Multiple critics have praised the game's length (estimated between 8 and 15 hours), which is considered good for a portable game. The translation's poor quality has also been criticized.

Back to Stone was heavily criticized almost unanimously for its lack of saving functionality, instead relying on a password-based system to track the player's progress, which was seen as a "cumbersome" flaw for a game on a handheld console, as well as "stupefying", "unforgivable" and "inexcusably archaic" when compared to other games released in this era.
