= Kaan: Barbarian's Blade =

2002 video game

- Developer: Eko Software
- Publisher: DreamCatcher Interactive
- Platforms: Windows, PlayStation 2
- Release: Windows: UK: 2002-11-01; PlayStation 2: UK: 2004-02-13
- Mode: Single-player

Kaan: Barbarian's Blade is a third-person action video game developed by Eko Software and published by DreamCatcher Interactive. The game was released for Microsoft Windows in 2002 and then ported to PlayStation 2 in 2004.

The game is available as a download via GamersGate and DotEmu.

The game has 17 levels, in which a young barbarian warrior, Kaan, must recover the Orb of Hope from Tothum Siptet, a sorcerer with evil powers.
