= Build-A-Bear Workshop (video game) =

2007 video game

- European box art
- Developer: Neko Entertainment
- Publisher: The Game Factory
- Platform: Nintendo DS
- Release: November 5, 2007
- Genre: Simulation
- Modes: Single-player, multiplayer

Build-A-Bear Workshop is a simulation video game for the Nintendo DS based on the retailer of the same name. It was developed by French company Neko Entertainment and published by The Game Factory for release on November 5, 2007. A follow-up, known as Build-A-Bear Workshop: A Friend Fur All Seasons, was released for the Wii in 2008. Two additional video games, Build-A-Bear Workshop: Welcome to Hugsville and Build-A-Bear Workshop: Friendship Valley, were released for the Nintendo DS and Wii, respectively, in 2010. Since The Game Factory went out of business before they were released, both games were published by Activision instead.

In the game, players use the touch screen (the buttons and microphone are not used often) to do activities and play with their bear. The player can choose one of six bears and customize it with clothes, accessories and shoes.

== Gameplay ==
When players start a new game, they go through the process of creating a bear, just like in the Build-A-Bear Workshop stores. Players choose a bear, then add a sound, stuff it, stitch it, fluff it, add starter clothing and give it a name. After the process is done, players are taken to the Cub Condo home. There are six rooms in the Cub Condo: a bedroom, a dressing room, a kitchen, the garden, the store and the attic. There are many different activities and minigames in each room, which is the main objective of the game. Players earn 'buttons' when playing certain minigames to purchase clothes and accessories for their bears. Throughout the year, there are special clothes on holidays (such as Christmas and Halloween) which the bear could wear.

=== Minigames ===
In the bedroom, the player can brush their bear's hair and clean their bear's teeth, then tidy up their room. In the dressing room, the player can change the bear's clothes to ones that they have purchased, and can also take photos in the Photo Studio. In the kitchen, the player can cook a variety of cakes for the bear to eat and set up their table. In the garden, the player can teach their bear to perform some dance moves and play a ball shooting game on the swing. In the store, the player can purchase clothing, accessories and shoes using 'buttons' and in the attic, there are four mini-games (cooking, musical chairs, catching honey and dancing) in which the player can earn buttons depending on their score.

=== Multiplayer ===
The player can also access the multiplayer mode via the attic. Each player is required to have a Build-A-Bear Workshop game card. In multiplayer mode, the player can challenge friends in minigames and trade photos taken from the dressing room.

== Reception ==
The game earned mixed reviews, with an average ratio of 67% at Game Rankings, and a score of 2.5 (out of 10) at Nintendo World Report.

=== Awards ===
Build-A-Bear Workshop earned an honorary award from the NAPPA Toy Awards in 2008.
