= Heracles Chariot Racing =

2007 video game

- Developer(s): Neko Entertainment
- Publisher(s): Midas Interactive (PS2); Neko Entertainment (Wii, PSP)
- Platform(s): PlayStation 2, Wii, PlayStation Portable
- Release: PlayStation 2: EU: June 29, 2007; WiiWare: NA: July 6, 2009; PAL: July 24, 2009; PlayStation Portable: EU: December 10, 2009; NA: December 17, 2009
- Genre(s): Racing
- Mode(s): Single-player, multiplayer

Heracles Chariot Racing is a racing game by Neko Entertainment originally released for PlayStation 2 in 2007. It was later released as a WiiWare game in North America and PAL regions in July 2009. PSP version was released through the PlayStation Network store as a downloadable title in December the same year.

== Gameplay ==
Players control Heracles or one of a number of characters from Greek mythology (such as Poseidon, Medusa and the Minotaur) in a series of horseless chariot races for the honor of being crowned the Champion Charioteer without a horse. In addition to picking up items to aid themselves, players can also hinder their opponents by using weaponry such as tridents, fireballs and Zeus' lightning in order to try trip them up.

The game features a Championship mode consisting of 3 cups with 10 tracks spread across 5 mythical environments (including Mount Olympus and Hades), as well as single race and Battle modes. The game features split-screen multiplayer for up to 4 players across all modes.
