= Handball (video game series) =

Handball simulator video game

- Genres: Sports, simulation
- Developer: Eko Software
- Publisher: Nacon
- Platforms: PlayStation 4, Xbox One, Microsoft Windows
- First release: Handball 16; 7 November 2015
- Latest release: Handball 21; 12 November 2021

Handball is a video game series released by Nacon. It is a simulator for handball.

== Handball 16 ==
- Cover athlete: Uwe Gensheimer
- Released for: Microsoft Windows, PlayStation Vita, PlayStation 3, PlayStation 4, Xbox 360, Xbox One
- Release date: 7 November 2015

The player models only vaguely match the real players and there are no away jerseys in the game, only home jerseys, resulting in matches with teams playing in the same colour.

== Handball 17 ==
- Cover athlete: Thierry Omeyer
- Released for: Microsoft Windows, PlayStation 3, PlayStation 4, Xbox One
- Release date: 11 November 2016

Handball 17 included LNH Division 2, the French second level handball league.

Handball 17 received negative reviews from critics. kicker commented that some aspects of the game were significantly worse than in Handball 16.

== Handball 21 ==
- Cover athlete: Mikkel Hansen
- Released for: Microsoft Windows, PlayStation 4, Xbox One
- Release date: November 2020

Handball 21 featured four major European leagues and several second divisions. 1,600 players were represented.

== Leagues ==
Nation	League	16	17	21
Germany	Handball-Bundesliga	Yes	Yes	Yes
Germany	2. Handball-Bundesliga	Yes	Yes	Yes
France	LNH Division 1	Yes	Yes	Yes
France	LNH Division 2	No	Yes	Yes
Spain	Liga ASOBAL	Yes	Yes	Yes
Poland	Superliga	No	No	Yes
Number of teams		68	82	
