= Eko Software =

French video game developer

- Industry: Video games
- Founded: 1999; 27 years ago
- Founder: Jules-Benjamin Lalisse
- Headquarters: Paris, France
- Revenue: 2,989,000 euro (2020)
- Net income: 823,400 euro (2020)
- Number of employees: 40 (2020)
- Parent: Nacon (2018–present)

Eko Software is a French video game developer located in the Choisy-le-roi suburb of Paris. The company was established in 1999 by Jules-Benjamin Lalisse.

In 2018, Bigben Interactive (now Nacon) acquired the company for an estimated €8.5 million.

== Games ==
Title	Release date	Platform(s)	Publisher	Ref.
Gift	2000	PlayStation 2, Windows	Cryo Interactive	
Woody Woodpecker: Escape from Buzz Buzzard Park	2001	PlayStation 2, Windows	Cryo Interactive	
Kaan: Barbarian's Blade	2002	PlayStation 2, Windows	DreamCatcher Interactive	
Gadget & Gadgetinis	2004	PlayStation 2, Windows	Hip Games	
Garfield: Saving Arlene	2005	PlayStation 2, Windows	Hip Games	
Th3 Plan	2006	PlayStation 2, Windows	Monte Cristo Multimedia	
Strawberry Shortcake: The Sweet Dreams Game	2006	PlayStation 2, Windows	The Game Factory	
Garfield: Lasagna World Tour	2007	PlayStation 2, Windows	Blast Entertainment (Europe) Conspiracy Entertainment (United States)	
Downstream Panic!	2008	Linux, MacOS, Nintendo DS, PlayStation 3, PlayStation Portable, Wii, Windows	Atari, XS Games, Neko Entertainment	
SPRay	2008	Wii	Tecmo	
Petz: Horsez 2	2009	PlayStation 2, PlayStation Portable, Wii, Windows	Ubisoft	
Adibou et les saisons magiques	2009	Wii, Windows	Mindscape	
The Garfield Show: The Threat of the Space Lasagna	2010	Wii, Windows	Zoo Games	
Storm	2013	PlayStation 3, Windows, Xbox 360	IndiePub	
How to Survive	2013	Xbox 360, Xbox One, Windows, PlayStation 3, PlayStation 4	505 Games	
Bella Sara 2: The Magic of Drasilmare	2013	Nintendo 3DS	Bigben Interactive	
Best of Board Games: Chess	2014	Nintendo 3DS, PlayStation 3, PlayStation Vita	Bigben Interactive	
Best of Board Games: Mah-jong	2014	Nintendo 3DS, PlayStation 3, PlayStation Vita	Bigben Interactive	
Best of Board Games: Solitaire	2014	Nintendo 3DS, PlayStation 3, PlayStation Vita	Bigben Interactive	
Best of Arcade Games: Air Hockey	2015	Nintendo 3DS, PlayStation 3, PlayStation Vita	Bigben Interactive	
Best of Arcade Games: Brick Breaker	2015	Nintendo 3DS, PlayStation 3, PlayStation Vita	Bigben Interactive	
Best of Arcade Games: Bubble Buster	2015	Nintendo 3DS, PlayStation 3, PlayStation Vita	Bigben Interactive	
Best of Arcade Games: Tetraminos	2015	Nintendo 3DS, PlayStation 3, PlayStation Vita	Bigben Interactive	
Handball 16	2015	Windows, PlayStation 3, PlayStation 4, PlayStation Vita, Xbox 360, Xbox One	Bigben Interactive	
How to Survive 2	2015	Windows, PlayStation 4, Xbox One	505 Games	
Handball 17	2016	Windows, PlayStation 3, PlayStation 4, Xbox One	Bigben Interactive	
Wanted Corp	2016	Windows, PlayStation Vita	Self-published	
Rugby 18	2017	Windows, PlayStation 4, Xbox One	Bigben Interactive	
Warhammer: Chaosbane	2019	Windows, PlayStation 4, Xbox One, Xbox Series X/S (2020), PlayStation 5 (2020)	Bigben Interactive	
Rugby 20	2020	Windows, PlayStation 4, Xbox One	Bigben Interactive	
Handball 21	2020	Windows, PlayStation 4, Xbox One	Nacon	
Rugby 22	2022	Windows, PlayStation 4, PlayStation 5, Xbox One, Xbox Series X/S,	Nacon	
Dragonkin: The Banished	TBA	Windows, PlayStation 5, Xbox Series X/S,	Nacon	
