= Calvin Tucker's Redneck Jamboree =

2008 video game

- Developer: Humagade
- Publisher: Zoo Games
- Platforms: Wii, Windows
- Release: NA: December 19, 2008; EU: March 27, 2009
- Genre: Various
- Modes: Single player, multiplayer

Calvin Tucker's Redneck Jamboree is a minigame compilation video game developed by Canadian studio Humagade and published by Zoo Games for Nintendo's Wii. It was released in North America on December 19, 2008, and in Europe on March 27, 2009. It received mostly negative reviews, which focused on its lack of content and poor gameplay.

== Gameplay ==
The "Backyard Shooting" requires the player to shoot objects with the Wii Remote.

Redneck Jamboree features twelve minigames which the player can participate in based on redneck activities. The game requires the player to play through the first six games repeatedly in order to unlock the other six. The player is able to spend bottle caps earned from getting high scores on games on further minigames.

The minigames include "Backyard Shooting", where the player shoots at objects with the Wii Remote, and a minigame which requires the player to explode fish out of water. Most of the games use the Wii remote's motion controls. The multiplayer mode allows for friends to play on the same screen. Each player takes turns playing a single player game for multiplayer, and compete to gain the highest score.

== Reception ==
Redneck Jamboree received negative reviews from critics, who focused on the game's lack of content and poor gameplay; it received a 30.5% from GameRankings. IGN's Aaron Thornton called the game "just a few simple mini-games thrown together in a lackluster package." He gave a token compliment to the game's variety, however, stating, "The mini-games are all pretty bad, but at least they're bad for a variety of reasons."

GameZone criticized the game's initially restricted content, feeling that the decision to restrict players from all the games upon initially starting the game was a, "bad game design decision". Destructoid's Conrad Zimmerman said that the game ranked among "the worst gaming experiences I have ever had."

== Sequel ==
The game's sequel, Calvin Tucker's Redneck: Farm Animals Racing Tournament, is a racing game that shares nothing in common with Redneck Jamboree except for the Calvin Tucker branding.
