= WWF Panda Junior =

2004 video game

- Release: 2004
- Genres: Educational, adventure

WWF Panda Junior is a 2004 educational adventure game developed by Neko Entertainment SARL and published by SG Diffusion for Windows. It was the first and only entry in the Safari Adventure game series, which were inspired by the work of the World Wild Fund for Nature (WWF), with between 50 cents and $1 from the purchase price donated to WWF.

== Gameplay and plot ==
Players take the role of either Alex or Emma as they discover the African continent with the aid of a WWF panda and a forest ranger.

== Critical reception ==
Jeux Video was disappointed that the gameplay was a bit repetitive and that the game was too short. Meanwhile, Meristation felt it was "near perfect".
