= Build 'n Race =

2009 video game

- Developer: Icon Games Entertainment
- Publisher: Zoo Games
- Platform: Wii
- Release: NA: August 4, 2009
- Genre: Racing
- Modes: Single-player, multiplayer

Build 'n Race is a video game developed by British studio Icon Games Entertainment and published by Zoo Games for the Wii. It was released on August 4, 2009, in North America.

== Gameplay ==
Build 'n Race is a game of high-speed racing through insane environments - huge jumps, ramps, raised hairpin turns, half-pipes and a multitude of other reflex testing track designs. Track creation tools allow the player to easily build courses using more than 1,000 different construction blocks, which can then be played in single or multiplayer modes.

=== Solo Race ===
Practice any of the tracks unlocked in the Championship Mode. No time limit applies in this mode. You can select tracks in any order providing you have already accessed them in the Championship Mode.

=== Time Trial ===
The objective in time trial mode is to complete a track in the quickest time to possible to get a place on the fastest time score board. This mode features a Best Time 'Replay Car', which appears after the first lap of the track. This car will replay your fastest time while you race - effectively you are your own opponent. You can select tracks in any order providing you have already accessed them in the Championship Mode.

=== Championship ===
The Championship Mode is set over eight cups with each cup featuring 7 or 8 different races. A race is held on each course with the seven participating cars vying for top honors. Once a cup race is over, driver points are distributed according to the driver's position. The total number of driver points determines a driver's overall ranking. The player who finishes in first place wins a gold cup, second a silver, and third a bronze. At the end of each race, a status screen displays the finish position of the cars. The winner's overall race time is displayed along with the best lap time and each losing car displays its time behind the leader's on the status board.

=== Challenges ===
The Challenge Modes allow the player to select one of four difficulty levels: Easy, Medium, Hard and Challenge. These correspond to the difficulty of the tracks you will race on. For each difficulty level there are 15 tracks. Initially only the Easy level will be available - with the player able to select any of the 15 tracks to race on. You can only unlock the next challenge level by winning at least a bronze on all of the tracks for the current difficulty level. In Race Challenge, you must finish in the top 3 to earn a medal (1st, 2nd, or 3rd to obtain gold, silver, or bronze respectively). You race the Al cars in this mode. In Time Challenge, each track has three reference times. Each one associated with a medal: bronze, silver, or gold.

=== Race environments ===
Build 'n Race features three different environment themes inspired by locations throughout the world.

Track Name	Description
AutoRace City	Speed through the city from downtown commercial and residential areas through to financial districts and shopping precincts. The driving is fast and unpredictable with wild stunts and jumps.
Tri-State Circuits	In arena made over the top racing with specifically designed stunt tracks, skyward spiralling road courses and more traditional motorsport race circuits. Enjoy the beautiful sunset sky, but watch out for the blimps on those high jumps!
Blackmoors Rally	Get dirty with the rally environment featuring dirt tracks and winding country lanes where wide sweeping curves and hair raising tight bends comes one after the other. With the tight chicanes and river crossings, the winding tree lined roads are surrounded by vast nuclear factories, wind farms, holiday parks and ancient ruins.

== Development ==
Zoo Games arranged a licensing deal with Pennzoil, but it fell through and as a result it lost the Pennzoil license.

== Reception ==
Build 'n Race was poorly received. One critic wrote: "Overall, Build 'n Race is one of the better entries in the Wii's budget-priced library...With some serious refinement and development, however, a sequel could catapult the game out of bargain bins and into shelf space reserved for premium titles." When compared to other games on the platform, especially those within the racing genre, it appears that the novelty that Build 'n Race had (user generated tracks) couldn't overcome the hurtle of its poor racing gameplay.
