= Kung Fu Rabbit =

2012 video game

- Developer: cTools Studio
- Publishers: Bulkypix; Neko Entertainment (3DS, PS3, PS Vita, Wii U)
- Producer: Cazap
- Platforms: Android, iOS, Nintendo 3DS, PlayStation 3, PlayStation Vita, Wii U
- Release: iOS; March 15, 2012; Android; November 24, 2012; Nintendo 3DS: WW: February 20, 2014
- Genre: Platformer
- Mode: Single-player

Kung Fu Rabbit is a platform video game for the Android, iOS, Nintendo 3DS, PlayStation 3, PlayStation Vita and Wii U. It was developed by French team cTools Studio for mobile platforms and published by Neko Entertainment for consoles. It features a white rabbit who teaches kung fu in the temple of rabbits. When the Universal Evil kidnaps all of his students, he goes on a quest to save them. The 3DS version was released on February 20, 2014 in North America and Europe, and in Japan on October 8.

== Reception ==
Reception

Aggregate score
Aggregator	Score
Metacritic	3DS: 65/100 iOS: 70/100; PSVita: 72/100; Wii U: 65/100

Review scores
Publication	Score
Nintendo Life	7/10
Nintendo World Report	3DS: 6/10; Wii U: 7.5/10
Pocket Gamer	7/10

Kung Fu Rabbit received mixed reviews from critics upon release. On Metacritic, the game holds scores of 65/100 for the 3DS version based on 6 reviews, 70/100 for the iOS version based on 10 reviews, 72/100 for the PS Vita version based on 5 reviews, and 65/100 for the Wii U version based on 14 reviews.

=== Awards ===
- Number 2 from Pocket Gamer Awards 2012
