= Super Army War =

2005 video game

- Developer(s): Neko Entertainment
- Publisher(s): Atlus USA; Neko Entertainment
- Designer(s): Olivier Denis
- Composer(s): Raphaël Gesqua
- Platform(s): Game Boy Advance
- Release: NA: February 23, 2005; EU: March 14, 2005
- Genre(s): Horizontal scrolling shooter Real-time tactics
- Mode(s): Single-player

Super Army War is a 2005 video game developed by French company Neko Entertainment for the Game Boy Advance. It was released in Europe under the title Glory Days: The Essence of War.

== Gameplay ==
The player controls a Huey or a WWII-era propeller fighter, each with different control schemes, to assist ground troops and tanks taking over enemy bunkers to gain credits (which used to automatically purchase armies or repair/refill player's vehicle), and eventually to destroy enemy base.

The Huey has capability to pick up ground troopers, and the fighter has quicker speed. Special weapons can be acquired through some circumstances, ranging from paratroopers to missiles.

== Reception ==
Critical reviews of Super Army War gathered by Metacritic averaged 58%, a mixed collective opinion of the game. It fared similarly at GameRankings with an average score of 63%.
