= Rugby 20 =

2020 video game

- Cover art featuring Irish international Johnny Sexton.
- Developer: Eko Software
- Publisher: Bigben Interactive
- Platforms: PlayStation 4; Windows; Xbox One
- Release: 23 January 2020
- Genres: Sports, simulation
- Modes: Single-player, multiplayer

Rugby 20 is a rugby union simulation video game developed by Eko Software and published by Bigben Interactive. It was released on 23 January 2020 for PlayStation 4, Windows, Xbox One. The game served as a sequel to Rugby 18 and was succeeded by Rugby 22.

== Development and release ==
On 10 May 2019, Bigben Interactive and EKO Software announced the development of a new rugby game to coincide with the 2019 Rugby World Cup. The game was scheduled to launch on PlayStation 4, Windows and Xbox One.

The game had a first closed beta phase that lasted from 13 September until 17 October 2019 and a second beta phase that lasted from 17 October until early November 2019 for PlayStation 4 and Xbox One. A tactical gameplay trailer was shown on 13 December 2019.

Rugby 20 officially released on 23 January 2020 for all platforms.

== Licenses ==
The game features the licence for all clubs in the Top 14, Pro D2, Gallagher Premiership and the Pro14. The national teams included in the game are Canada, France, Georgia, Italy, Ireland, Japan, Namibia, Russia, Samoa, Scotland, USA and Wales. However, the game does not have the license for other national teams, such as Australia, New Zealand, England, South Africa, Argentina, Fiji and Uruguay.

== Reception ==
Reception

Aggregate score
| Aggregator | Score |
|---|---|
| Metacritic | (PS4) 49/100 (XONE) (57/100) |

Review scores
| Publication | Score |
|---|---|
| Push Square | 5/10 |
| Screen Rant | 5/10 |

Rugby 20 received "generally unfavourable" reviews from critics on PlayStation 4 whilst it received "mixed or average" reviews from critics on Xbox One, according to review aggregator site Metacritic.

Push Square rated the game 5/10, and wrote: "The title does a good job of simulating the territorial battles that occur in real-world rugby matches, but it’s generally clumsy and there’s no real consistency to the way players move". Screen Rant also rated the game 5/10 and described Rugby 20 as a "missed opportunity".
