= Fireburst =

2010 video game

- Developer: exDream
- Publishers: IndiePub; Bigben Interactive
- Engine: Unreal Engine 3
- Platforms: PlayStation 3, Windows, Xbox 360
- Release: PlayStation 3: EU: April 16, 2010; Windows; April 25, 2012; Xbox 360; June 14, 2013
- Genre: Racing
- Modes: Single-player, multiplayer

Fireburst is a racing game developed by exDream and published by IndiePub and Bigben Interactive. It was released for PlayStation 3 on April 16, 2010 (Europe only), for Microsoft Windows on April 25, 2012, and for Xbox 360's Xbox Live Arcade on June 14, 2013.

== Gameplay ==
In Fireburst, the Fireboost covers the cars with flames and turns them into a weapon. With the Fireboost, players can kill other opponents, but the player's car will explode if their heat level becomes too great.

== Plot ==
Charles Randolph, known as "Hightower", invented the Fireburst Racing League and is determined to be the first champion in order to restore his dignity and reputation.

== Reception ==
Reception

Aggregate score
Aggregator	Score
Metacritic	(PC) 59/100 (X360) 35/100

Review scores
Publication	Score
GameSpot	(PC) 5/10
GameZone	(PC) 4/10
Hardcore Gamer	(X360) 2/5
Official Xbox Magazine (UK)	(X360) 5/10
Official Xbox Magazine (US)	(X360) 1.5/10

The PC version received "mixed" reviews, while the Xbox 360 version received "generally unfavorable reviews", according to the review aggregation website Metacritic.

Carolyn Petit of GameSpot called the PC version "good-looking" and its boost mechanic exciting, but said that it lacked interesting single-player content. Similarly, John Blyth of Official Xbox Magazine UK called the Xbox 360 version a "perfectly average experience", but criticized its destruction mode as "dull". Bryan Dupont-Gray of Hardcore Gamer said that the fact it was a party racing game was a "misstep".
