= Cocoto Magic Circus =

2006 video game

- Developer: Neko Entertainment
- Publishers: Conspiracy Entertainment; BigBen Interactive
- Composer: Raphaël Gesqua
- Platforms: PlayStation 2, GameCube, Wii, Microsoft Windows
- Release: PlayStation 2, GameCube: PAL: April 7, 2006; Microsoft Windows: EU: April 28, 2006; Wii: NA: March 12, 2008; AU: March 13, 2008
- Genre: Shoot 'em up
- Modes: Single-player, multiplayer

Cocoto Magic Circus, also known as Cocoto Funfair in Europe, is a 2006 shoot 'em up video game released by Neko Entertainment. A Wii version of this game was released in March 2008. This version was released in North America, Australia, and Europe. A sequel Cocoto Magic Circus 2 was released on December 26, 2013 for the Wii U. Up to 4 players can compete with each other in 40 different minigames.

== Characters ==
Cocoto: One of the game's main protagonists, the red creature of the group. Neuro: One of Cocoto's sidekicks, the blue creature who wears glasses. Baggy: Cocoto's big sidekick, the green guy in the group. Shiny: Cocoto's final sidekick, the pink female who wears caveman style clothing. Fairy: The game's damsel in distress. She is captured by the game's antagonist. Clown: The game's main antagonist. He wears a black coat, red shoes, a striped T-shirt and a white and red face.

== Minigames ==
Free fairy: This minigame involves shooting enemies into an object that will help release fairy. When freeing her, she will be revealed to be an enemy in disguise.

Protect Fairy: This minigame is about shooting the enemies before they reach Fairy. Once they defeat all the enemies, the Fairy will fly around, only to get grabbed by the clown.

Fightback: This minigame involves the character the player is using and an enemy. They must shoot an object back into the enemy. When the time runs out, the object will explode and whoever it's nearer to will be defeated.
