= Order Up! =

2008 video game

- Box art for Wii version
- Developer: SuperVillain Studios
- Publishers: WW: Zoo Games, Ignition Entertainment (PS3), Chillingo (iOS), Nicalis (Switch 2); PAL: Funbox Media
- Director: Lee Cummings
- Composer: Robb Mills
- Platforms: Wii; PlayStation 3 Nintendo 3DS iOS; Android; Nintendo Switch 2
- Release: Wii: NA: July 22, 2008; AU: October 23, 2008; EU: October 24, 2008; PlayStation 3, 3DS: EU: December 9, 2011; NA: March 1, 2012 (PS3); AU: May 23, 2012 (PS3); NA: June 21, 2012 (3DS); iOS, Android; January 19, 2012; Switch 2 Q3 2026
- Genre: Cooking simulation
- Modes: Single-player, multiplayer (PlayStation 3 and Nintendo 3DS versions only)

Order Up! is a cooking simulation-styled mini-game compilation developed by SuperVillain Studios and published by Zoo Games and Funbox Media. It was released on July 22, 2008 in North America, October 23 in Australia, and October 24 in Europe for the Wii. An enhanced port titled Order Up!! was released for the PlayStation 3 and Nintendo 3DS on December 9, 2011 in Europe and June 21, 2012 in North America. The game was released on iOS and Android as Order Up!! To Go. In 2025, Amazon featured a listing of a Nintendo Switch 2 version published by Nicalis. The Switch 2 version will be released in 2026.

== Plot ==
The player assumes the role of a budding chef who has landed on the island of Port Abello, one of the most important locations on the culinary map. After learning the trade in a local fast food joint, the player then purchases five different restaurants across the island, each serving food from different cultures. The Fortified Chef Competition is about to visit town and winning it would launch the player to the centre of the culinary stage.

== Gameplay ==
The game sees the player purchasing and managing various restaurants and trying to earn 5 stars at each by completing goals such as unlocking recipes or impressing a food critic. Certain customers that appear frequently will have special requirements for their meals and the player will have to buy different spices and seasonings to get a bigger tip from them.

The cooking portion of the gameplay sees the player using the motion controls of the Wii Remote (or PlayStation Move control and 3DS touchscreen, respectively) to prepare dishes for customers. Although similar to the gameplay in the Cooking Mama series, Order Up! focuses more on speed, multitasking and time management to ensure a table's order of multiple dishes is sent out on time rather than to simply successfully complete a single dish. Non-cooking minigames include washing plates and shooing rats.

The PlayStation 3 and Nintendo 3DS versions add a turn-based multiplayer option and extra restaurant. Order Up!! features higher resolution textures, enhanced scene lighting and more.

== Development ==
On April 23, 2008, Order Up! was announced by SuperVillain Studios and was dubbed as "Cooking Mama meets The Sims meets Diner Dash" by some critics. Lee Cummings, who was previously creative director for the games Grand Theft Auto and Bully was working as director for Order Up!.

On May 20, 2010, SuperVillain Studios released a teaser image for a possible sequel to Order Up!. It was later confirmed on March 9, 2011 that an enhanced port of the original game would be released for the PlayStation 3, for the Nintendo 3DS as Order Up! 3D, iOS and Android as Order Up!: Take Out Edition and another "TBA" platform. The final title for the port was later confirmed to be Order Up!! on May 18 alongside promotional images for the game. It was also announced on June 20, 2011 that Robb Mills would be composing an original soundtrack for the game after composing the music for the games Fat Princess and its sequel.

== Reception ==
Reception

Aggregate score
Aggregator	Score
Metacritic	(iOS, Wii) 76/100 (3DS) 72/100 (PS3) 55/100

Review scores
Publication	Score
Game Informer	(Wii) 7.75/10
GamePro	(Wii) 4.25/5
GameRevolution	(Wii) B−
GameSpot	(Wii) 7.5/10
Gamezebo	(iOS) 2.5/5
GameZone	(PS3) 8/10 (Wii) 7/10
IGN	(Wii) 7.7/10
Nintendo Power	(Wii) 7/10 (3DS) 6.5/10
Pocket Gamer	(iOS) 3.5/5
PlayStation: The Official Magazine	(PS3) 5/10
TouchArcade	(iOS) 4/5

Order Up! received "generally favorable reviews", while Order Up!! received "mixed or average reviews" on both platforms, according to the review aggregation website Metacritic.

1Up.com said that the Wii version was much more fleshed out than most cooking games. IGN called it a "surprisingly fun restaurant sim".

== Order Up!! To Go ==
Chillingo released an iOS version in 2012 as Order Up!! To Go. It received "generally favorable reviews" according to Metacritic. It was discontinued in 2017 due to the release of iOS 11 and later ending compatibility with 32-bit applications.
