= Vessel (video game) =

2012 video game

- Cover art
- Developer: Strange Loop Games
- Publisher: indiePub
- Composer: Jon Hopkins
- Platforms: Windows, PlayStation 3, OS X, Linux
- Release: Windows; March 1, 2012; Linux; December 11, 2012; OS X January 7, 2013; PlayStation 3: PAL: March 12, 2014; NA: March 13, 2014
- Genre: Puzzle-platform
- Mode: Single-player

Vessel is a physics-based, steampunk, puzzle-platform game developed by Strange Loop Games and published by indiePub. It was released March 1, 2012 for Microsoft Windows, for Linux on December 11, 2012 and for PlayStation 3's PlayStation Network in March 2014. An OS X version was released on January 7, 2013.

== Plot ==
The main character of Vessel is M. Arkwright, an inventor who creates a liquid-composed labor-performing automaton, called the Fluro. He creates this automaton in order to perform laborious tasks more efficiently than human beings. However, the Fluros begin to run amok, and cause the world's machinery to malfunction.

In order to restore the machinery back to a functioning status, Arkwright must travel through the world of Vessel and fix the broken parts. In addition to creating the Fluro automaton, he creates Seeds, which are small devices that allow him to control an area's surrounding liquid and transform it into a Fluro. This newly created Fluro can then be used to fix the machinery by influencing it on where to go and what to do.

== Gameplay ==
M. Arkwright sprays enemy lava Fluros with his liquid gun.

Vessel is a puzzle-platformer that teaches and reveals its mechanics as the player progresses through the game. Using many different forms of liquid, such as water or lava, the player creates Fluros to do things such as activate switches, move cogs, and pull levers. The player can also use M. Arkwright's liquid gun to spray fluid at switches that need to be activated. For areas that the player can't reach, they can create a Fluro from the available liquid in the world's level, and have the newly created automaton go there.

As the Fluros are automatons, they have their own habits and abilities. Some are attracted to light, and others dark. Considerations like these are key to progressing through a level, as the player must influence the Fluros to do what they would like.

The level design of Vessel grants the player freedom in how to solve a particular puzzle. Each one has multiple solutions, and it is up to the player's choices and creativity as to how to solve it.

== Development ==
=== Team ===
Strange Loop Games is a company founded by two programmers: John Krajewski and Martin Farren. Both former employees of Electronic Arts, they left in order to pursue creating games with new and interesting gameplay mechanics instead of high quality graphics. The Vessel team includes Milenko Tunjic, the art director, and Mark Filippelli, the lead artist. Both were responsible for creating the visual component of Vessel's steampunk world. Further, under the direction of audio director Leonard Paul and audio programmer Kieran Lord, all of the music was composed by electronica musician Jon Hopkins.

=== Technology ===
The game itself consists largely of a custom liquid-physics engine, as well as music and artificial intelligence engines. The physics engine consists of individual particles that exhibit pressure on one another, as well as taking surface tension and viscosity into consideration. The created fluid shapes are also illuminated through a clustering algorithm that adds point-lights to a liquid depending on how closely packed a group of particles are. The artificial intelligence engine works in conjunction with the individual particle physics of the liquids in game. Vessel uses a custom built engine that specializes in physics and fluid simulation.

=== Art ===
The art of Vessel is 2.5D style. It visualizes the steampunk world and allows the player to look at a machine in the game, and see all of its components and how it functions. This helps the player learn what they need to do in order to play the level and fix the machinery.

=== Sound ===
The music, composed by Jon Hopkins, builds as players progress towards solving a specific puzzle. Upon first starting a puzzle, the music is smooth and put towards the background. As the player begins to figure out the puzzle, the music gets increasingly more complex, adding in drums and bass. By the time the puzzle is complete, the full music track is playing. The game contains 7 tracks from Hopkins' 2009 album Insides (including the eponymous track Vessel), and 3 from his album Contact Note.

The sound of Vessel was the topic of a talk at the 2012 Game Developers Conference. Leonard J. Paul, the game's audio director, discussed its sound design and implementation. Using FMOD, Lua, and C++, the game uses techniques such as granular synthesis, subtractive synthesis, layered sequencing, spectral layering, LFO modulation, and asymmetric loops.

== Reception ==
Reception

Aggregate score
Aggregator	Score	
Aggregator	PC	PS3
Metacritic	81/100	84/100

Review scores
Publication	Score	
Publication	PC	PS3
4Players	87%	87%
Destructoid	7/10	N/A
G4	4/5	N/A
Game Informer	7.75/10	N/A
GameSpy	4.5/5	N/A
GamesRadar+	4/5	N/A
Gamezebo	4.5/5	N/A
IGN	8/10	N/A
PC Gamer (UK)	72%	N/A
Push Square	N/A	8/10

The PC and PlayStation 3 versions received "favorable" reviews according to the review aggregation website Metacritic.
