= Cocoto Platform Jumper =

2004 video game

- Developer: Neko Entertainment
- Publishers: BigBen Interactive; Neko Entertainment
- Composer: Raphaël Gesqua
- Platforms: GameCube, PlayStation 2, Game Boy Advance, Windows, Wii
- Release: PlayStation 2: PAL: July 9, 2004; GameCube: PAL: December 10, 2004; Windows: PAL: December 7, 2006; Game Boy Advance: PAL: July 10, 2007; Wii: NA: April 27, 2009; PAL: June 12, 2009
- Genre: Platform
- Mode: Single-player

Cocoto Platform Jumper is a platform game developed by Neko Entertainment and published in 2004 in PAL regions by BigBen Interactive for PlayStation 2 and GameCube. Later was released versions for Microsoft Windows (2006) and Game Boy Advance (2007), then for Wii in North America and PAL in 2009.

== Gameplay ==
The game sees players controlling Cocoto, a little red imp, across a number of spiraling levels. The gameplay is very similar to that of Taito's Rainbow Islands: The Story of Bubble Bobble 2, with the player using magma arches the same way as the rainbows in said game, collecting items and power-up, defeating enemies, and reaching the top of the level before time runs out. Cocoto can use his pitchfork as a projectile to defeat enemies, or use the arches. Fairy will appear as a checkpoint. The game features 40 levels spanning across 5 different worlds. There are 30 enemies that vary depending on the level, and the end of each world features a boss fight. There is a two player battle mode where both players defeat each other's imps, and a four player race, where the first imp that reaches the top is the winner.

The Game Boy Advance version has the game play in 2D due to technical limitations.

== Development ==
Cocoto Platform Jumper was created with the intent for the game to be "simple and easy" for everyone, and was inspired by the video game Nebulus. They spent weeks fine-tuning the levels in order to make them appropriately balanced for difficulty.

The game was re-released on the Wii's WiiWare service. Initially, they considered adding new modes and refining old ones, but opted to simply add Wii Remote motion controls.

== Reception ==
Reception

Aggregate score
| Aggregator | Score | | | |
| Aggregator | GBA | GameCube | PS2 | Wii |
|---|---|---|---|---|
| Metacritic | N/A | N/A | N/A | 59/100 |

Review scores
| Publication | Score | | | |
| Publication | GBA | GameCube | PS2 | Wii |
|---|---|---|---|---|
| GamePro | N/A | N/A | N/A | 3/5 |
| GameSpot | N/A | N/A | N/A | 4/10 |
| IGN | N/A | N/A | N/A | 6/10 |
| Jeuxvideo.com | 11/20 | 12/20 | 12/20 | N/A |
| Nintendo Life | N/A | N/A | N/A | 7/10 |
| Official Nintendo Magazine | N/A | N/A | N/A | 60% |

The Wii version received "mixed" reviews according to the review aggregation website Metacritic.
