= Bigfoot: Collision Course =

2008 video game

- Developer: Destination Software
- Publisher: Zoo Games
- Platforms: Microsoft Windows, Nintendo DS, Wii
- Release: NA: December 5, 2008 (Wii); NA: January 9, 2009 (DS); PAL: July 31, 2009
- Genre: Racing

Bigfoot: Collision Course is a 2008 Racing video game developed by Destination Software and published by Zoo Games for the Wii, Nintendo DS and Microsoft Windows. Based on the Bigfoot monster truck.

The game features three vehicle categories: light (amateur) monster trucks, pro stock monster trucks and pro modified monster trucks, with differing course configurations for each vehicle class.
