= Sharon Price John =

President and CEO of Build-A-Bear Workshop (born 1964)

Sharon John
- Born: Sharon Price; January 29, 1964 (age 62)
- Education: Bachelor of Science; Master of Business Administration
- Alma mater: University of Tennessee Knoxville; Columbia University
- Occupations: Business executive, author, public speaker, podcast host, executive producer
- Years active: 1989–present
- Employer: Build-A-Bear Workshop
- Known for: Leadership of Build-A-Bear Workshop
- Notable work: Stories and Heart: Unlock the Power of Personal Stories to Create a Life You Love
- Title: President and Chief Executive Officer

Sharon John (née Price, born January 29, 1964) is an American businessperson, public speaker, author, podcast host and executive producer as well as the president and CEO of Build-A-Bear Workshop (NYSE:BBW).

== Education ==
John graduated with honors from the University of Tennessee Knoxville in 1986 with a Bachelor of Science (BS) Degree. She has received the Heilman Award as a distinguished alumnus of the College of Communications and the Torchbearer Award as a distinguished alumnus of the university. In 2016, she was recognized by the university as one of the top 100 graduates of the last 100 years to commemorate the centennial celebration of the university's Torchbearer Magazine.

She holds a Master of Business Administration (MBA) from Columbia University (1994) with an emphasis on international business.

== Career ==
John's career began in the advertising industry with various agencies. Starting in 1989 in New York City, she worked at DDB Worldwide. She then worked at Bates USA until 1991 as an account supervisor.

After receiving her MBA, John held a range of senior management positions in the toy industry. She spent seven years at Hasbro (NYSE: HAS) in roles including the general manager and senior vice president of global preschool (inclusive of Playskool and Play-Doh) and as the general manager and senior vice president for the U.S. Toy Division. During her tenure, she oversaw an array of brands, including Transformers, Nerf, Littlest Pet Shop, and My Little Pony, while managing licensing relationships such as Star Wars and Marvel.

John served as the president of the Stride Rite Children's Group LLC (SRCG) at Wolverine World Wide (NYSE: WWW) from 2010 to 2013.

John has been president and CEO of Build-A-Bear since 2013. In 2018, Build-A-Bear gained over one billion media impressions in a single day spurred by the "Pay Your Age Day" promotion. The following day, John discussed the event on the NBC's Today (American TV program).

In 2020, Build-A-Bear experienced the COVID-induced forced closure of all physical retail locations. In 2021, Build-A-Bear Workshop delivered the most profitable year in its history.

=== Other business ventures ===
John has served as a member of the board of directors for Jack in the Box (NASDAQ:JACK) since 2014. Other toy industry experience includes serving as the vice president of product development and marketing at the U.S. Division of Vtech Toys as well as working in business units for both the Barbie brand and the Disney licensing division at Mattel (NYSE: MAT) for over 5 years. In her role in Disney business, John served as the director of European marketing in Paris, France, which led to her becoming the vice president of international marketing for the Disney licensing division upon her return in 1998.

== Public appearances ==
John has participated in national media interviews. Select engagements include: United Nations with IDEAGEN, Salesforce Dreamforce keynote and panel, Shoptalk keynote, Best Places to Work Conference keynote, Women in Retail Leadership Summit keynote, Columbia Business School address, and University of Tennessee College of Communications Commencement.

John is part of the Fortune "Most Powerful Women" (MPW) organization, a member of The Committee of 200 (C200), and engaged in the Women Corporate Directors (WCD) group. John has also been a contributing writer to Fortune.

== Books ==
John's first book is titled Stories and Heart: Unlock the Power of Personal Stories to Create a Life You Love. The book launched on January 17, 2023.

John is the host of a podcast inspired by her book, also entitled Stories & Heart: Unlock the Power of Personal Stories to Create a Life You Love. The podcast is created and produced in conjunction with Forbes Books.

== TV and film ==
Film
Year	Title	Credit	Notes
2020	Deliver by Christmas	Executive Producer & Concept	"Concept" credit in conjunction with Hallmark Media and Foundation Media Partners.
2021	Honey Girls	Executive Producer & "Story by"	In conjunction with Sony Pictures Worldwide Entertainment and Foundation Media Partners.
2021	Christmas CEO	Executive Producer & Concept	"Concept" credit in conjunction with Hallmark Media and Foundation Media Partners
2023	Glisten and the Merry Mission	Executive Producer & Writer	In conjunction with Foundation Media Partners
2023	Unstuffed: A Build-A-Bear Story	Executive Producer	In conjunction with Foundation Media Partners.
TBD	"Goldie Reimagined" (working title)	Executive Producer	In conjunction with Hello Sunshine and Foundation Media Partners.

Television
Year	Title	Role	Notes
2016	Undercover Boss	Appearance, Season 8, Episode 1	John was featured on the premiere episode of Season 8 of the hit CBS series "Undercover Boss" in December 2016. In this episode, she donned a disguise while working with store and warehouse associates at Build-A-Bear Workshop to gain unfiltered feedback on changes the company was executing to reposition the organization for future growth

== Accomplishments and recognition ==
- "Wonder Woman of Toys" from Women in Toys (WIT) 2009
- Fortune, Most Powerful Women; "MPW Insider" contributing writer 2014/15
- CEO Magazine, Transformative CEO of the Year 2020 & 2022
- Retail Today, Top 50 Outstanding Women in Retail 2022

== Personal life ==
John lives in St. Louis with her husband, and she has three children.
