= Fuze Tomahawk F1 =

2016 microconsole

The Fuze Tomahawk F1 is a microconsole running Android TV released in 2016.

== History ==
=== In China ===
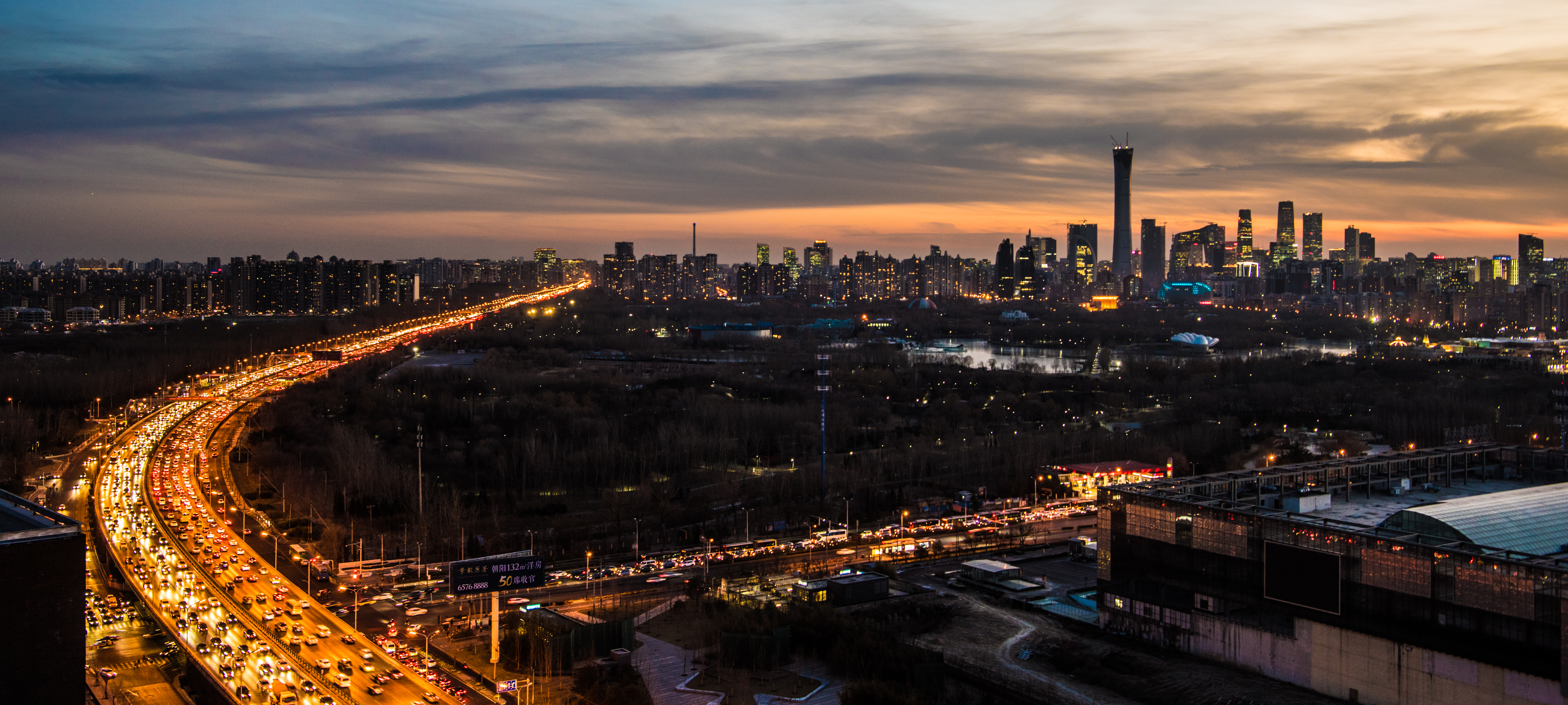
Beijing, China in 2017, where Fuze Entertainment was based.

The Fuze Tomahawk F1 was developed by Fuze Entertainment, a company based in Beijing, the capital city of China. The console received attention in the west due to its similarities to the Xbox One and PlayStation 4, as well as backing from noted game developer Keiji Inafune.

The Fuze 1 was released in China on June 1st, 2016 with the Play model costing 899 yuan and the Elite model costing 1499 yuan. The system is also known as the Tomahawk F1.

=== The SouljaGame Fuze ===
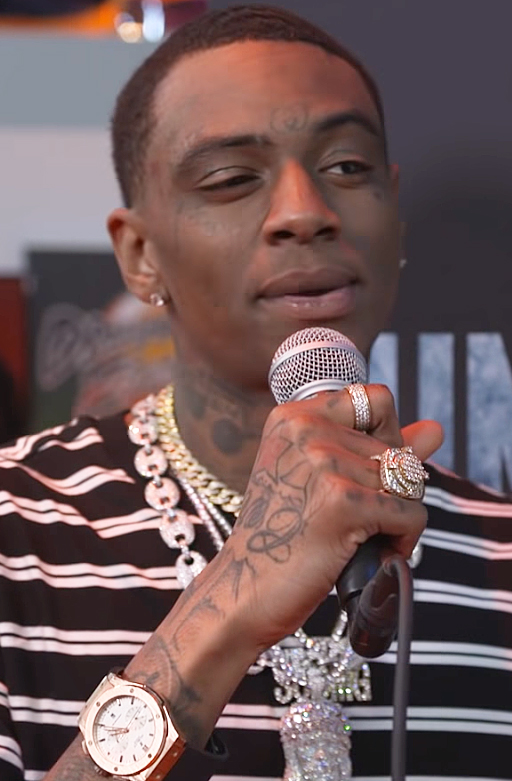
Rapper Soulja Boy in 2018.

In late 2018 the console gained attention in the west after rapper Soulja Boy tried to bring it to market as the SouljaGame Fuze. The version of Fuze sold by Soulja Boy was likely the Elite model. The SouljaGame Fuze had a listed price of $639.98, though the system likely spent its whole time on the market on sale for $399.99 with either case being a significant markup over the MSRP of $320 for a non-SouljaGame Fuze at the time. It is unknown if the SouljaGame Fuze ever sold, though the media frenzy created around the announcement alone is notable in its own right.

== Technology ==
=== Computing ===
The console is powered by a NVIDIA Tegra K1 system on a chip containing four ARM Cortex A15 cores clocked at 2.2 gigahertz. For memory the system had four gigabytes of DDR3 RAM clocked at 933 megahertz.

The Play model has 32 gigabytes of eMMC solid state storage, while the Elite model has a mechanical 500 gigabyte hard disk drive.

=== Hardware ===
The Fuze supports Wi-Fi and Bluetooth. The console requires a constant internet connection to play games, and is known to operate poorly outside of China.The Elite model can use wirelessly charge controllers. The charging is initiated when a controller is placed on top of the console, depressing dual diagonal plates on the top.

The console was intended to be able to run a VR headset, though it is unknown if such a headset was ever released. The headset was set to launch at a cost of 1,100 RMB in 2016.

=== Software ===
The Fuze operating system is based on Android, a popular choice for microconsoles of the time. As the console was only officially released in China, the interface is nearly exclusively in Chinese language.

The Panda TV streaming service was originally supported, but this third party streaming service was shuttered in 2019.
