= Build-A-Bear Workshop =

American retail company

Build-A-Bear Workshop, Inc.
- Type: Public
- Traded as: NYSE: BBW; Russell Microcap Index
- Industry: Retail
- Founded: October 27, 1997; 29 years ago in St. Louis, Missouri, U.S.
- Founder: Maxine Clark
- Headquarters: St. Louis, Missouri, U.S.
- Number of locations: 525 (2024)
- Area served: United States; Australia; Bahrain; Canada; Chile; Colombia; Denmark; Fiji; Germany; Hong Kong; Ireland; Italy; Kuwait; Mexico; New Zealand; Norway; South Africa; United Arab Emirates; United Kingdom
- Key people: Chris Hurt (CEO)
- Products: Stuffed toys
- Brands: Build-A-Dino; Beary Fairy Friends; Honey Girls; Kabu; Promise Pets
- Revenue: ▲US$530 million (2025)
- Net income: ▲US$52.2 million (2025)
- Number of employees: ~5,643 (2011)
- Divisions: Build-A-Bear label (JV)
- Subsidiaries: Build-A-Bear Entertainment, LLC
- Website: buildabear.com

Build-A-Bear Workshop, Inc. is an American retailer headquartered in St. Louis, Missouri, that sells teddy bears, stuffed animals, and licensed character merchandise. Customers create and customize stuffed animals through an interactive process that allows them to select sounds, scents, clothing, and accessories for their chosen plush toy. Build-A-Bear Workshop is the largest chain to operate using this retail concept.

The company's slogan was "Where Best Friends Are Made" from 1997 to 2013. In 2013, it adopted the slogan "The Most Fun You'll Ever Make", which remained in use until a brand refresh in 2024 introduced "The Stuff You Love".

In March 2026, Chris Hurt was named chief executive officer following the announced retirement of Sharon Price John.

== History ==
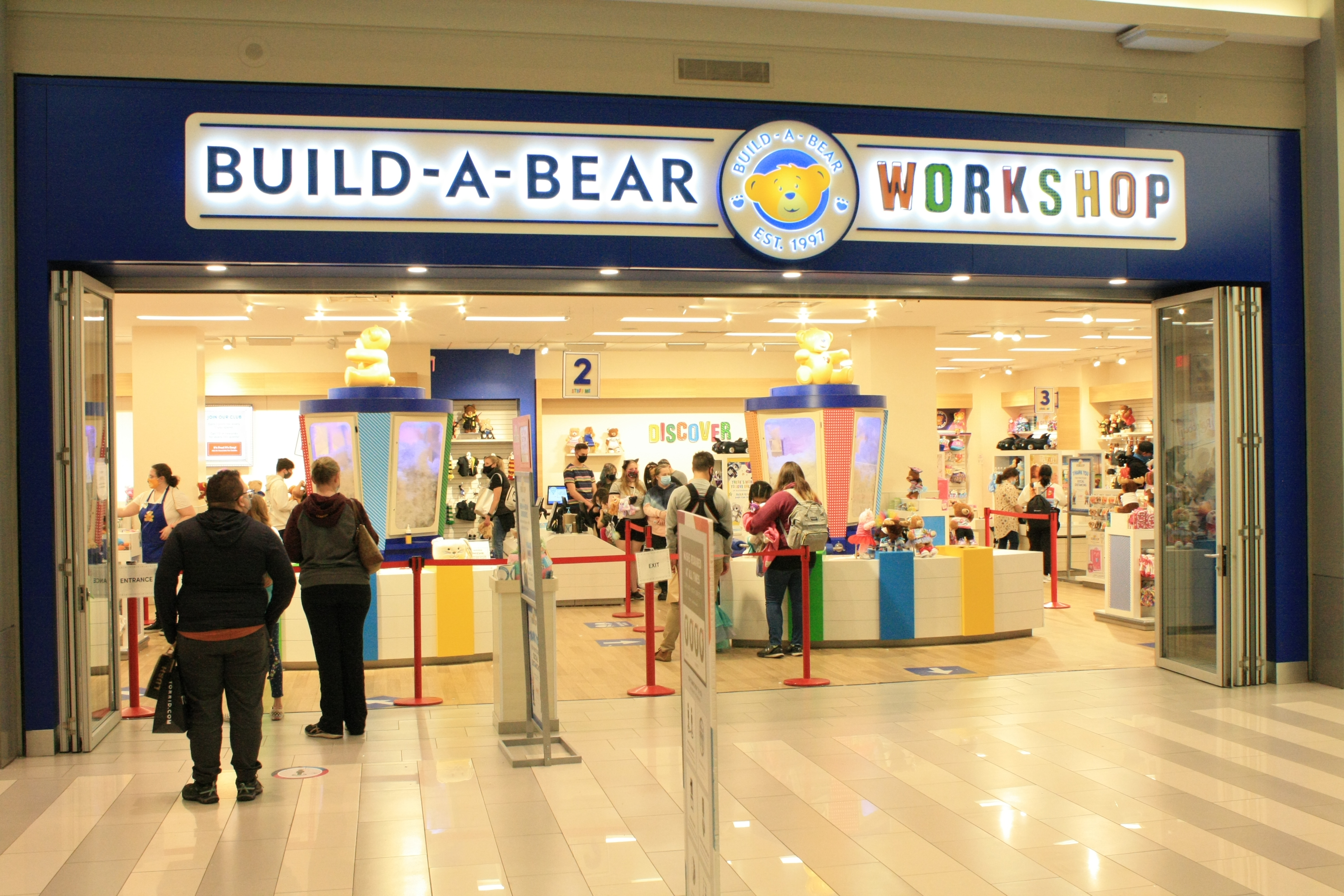
A Modern Style Build-A-Bear workshop located inside the Mall of America

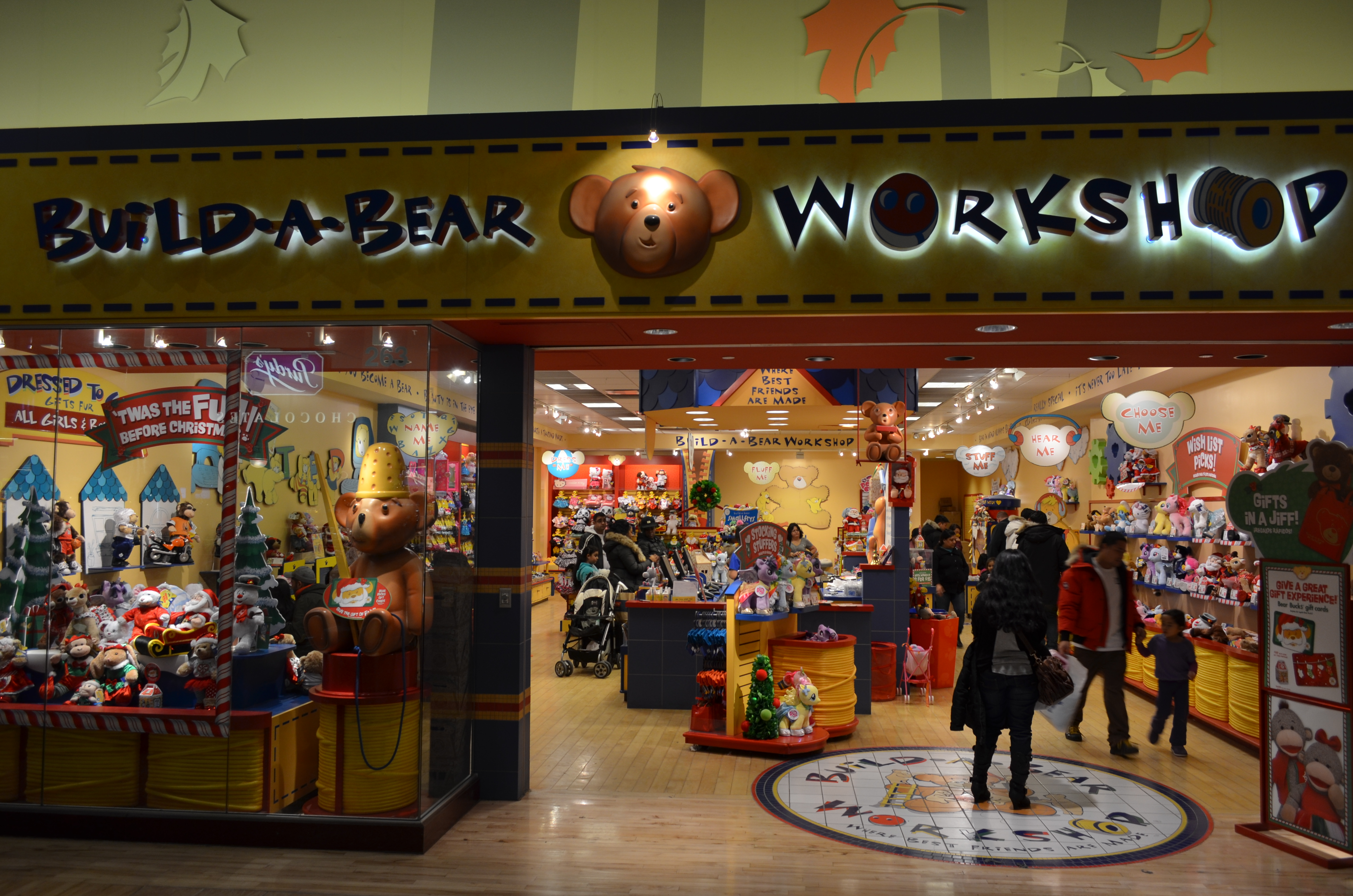
A Vintage Style Build-A-Bear Workshop at Vaughan Mills in Toronto

In the mid-1990s, Maxine Clark resigned as president of Payless ShoeSource and began developing concepts for interactive retail stores inspired by experiences she remembered from her childhood. After presenting several ideas to a group of children, the build-a-bear concept was selected. According to Clark, the children responded most positively to the idea, and stuffed animals offered a strong profit margin. Doll shops, later developed as Friends 2B Made, were also part of the original business plan.

Clark founded Build-A-Bear Workshop in 1997. That year she also explored acquiring Basic Brown Bears, a company that had operated in the do-it-yourself stuffed animal market since 1985. Build-A-Bear hired Adrienne Weiss Co. of Los Angeles to help develop the retail concept. Clark planned to expand the business into a national chain, targeting 100 stores within five years.

The company's first store opened at Saint Louis Galleria in Richmond Heights, Missouri. First-year sales exceeded projections, reaching approximately $377,600.

Expansion began quickly. Kansas City Equity Partners invested in the company, allowing a second store to open in Overland Park, Kansas in August 1998. Windsor Capital later invested $4.5 million, supporting additional store openings in the Chicago area. By the end of 1998, the chain had four locations and reported sales of $3.3 million.

In 1999, Walnut Capital Partners invested $5 million to support further expansion, bringing the chain to 14 stores. That same year, Build-A-Bear became involved in legal disputes with competitors Vermont Teddy Bear Co. and Basic Brown Bears over trademark, copyright, and business practice claims. The dispute with Basic Brown Bears was ultimately settled under a confidentiality agreement.

=== McDonald's Happy Meal Promotions ===
Build-A-Bear Workshop has partnered with McDonald's on multiple Happy Meal promotions. In 2006, McDonald's restaurants in the United States offered a collection of Build-A-Bear Workshop Happy Meal toys.

The promotion returned in 2007. Build-A-Bear Workshop stated that the program represented the second year of its Happy Meal and Mighty Kids Meal partnership with McDonald's. The 2007 promotion included eight mini stuffed animals distributed between August 3 and August 30, 2007.

Additional Build-A-Bear Workshop Happy Meal promotions were documented in 2013 and 2015.

=== Build-A-Bearville ===
In October 2007, Build-A-Bear Workshop launched Build-A-Bearville, a massively multiplayer online game developed in partnership with Frima Studio. The game allowed users to create characters, play games, explore virtual locations, participate in events, and interact with other players in a moderated online environment.

Some Build-A-Bear products included redeemable codes that unlocked virtual items and content within the game. However, purchasing products was not required to play, and users could access most features by creating a free account.

In January 2015, Build-A-Bear announced that Build-A-Bearville would close on March 31, 2015. Following its closure, the company launched the children's website Bearville Alive!, which featured web series content based on Build-A-Bear.

=== Walmart wholesale partnership ===
In March 2026, Build-A-Bear launched its first wholesale partnership with Walmart. The collaboration brought Build-A-Bear products to more than 1,500 Walmart stores and Walmart.com.

The initial product assortment included Mini Beans, Micro Mini Beans mystery packs, and the Build-A-Bear x Bluey collection developed in partnership with BBC Studios. Products were displayed in dedicated sections inspired by elements of the traditional Build-A-Bear experience. Mini Beans plush toys included birth certificate-inspired hang tags and the company's signature heart insert.

The partnership followed record fiscal 2025 results for the company, during which annual revenue exceeded $500 million for the first time.

=== Destination and specialty locations ===
Build-A-Bear Workshop has operated a variety of destination and specialty location in addition to its traditional retail stores.

== Public company ==
Clark took Build-A-Bear Workshop public in 2004. The company opened its first international franchise location in Sheffield, England, and licensed Hasbro to produce a home bear-stuffing kit.

Build-A-Bear began testing a make-your-own-doll concept in 2004. In November of that year, the company opened the first Friends 2B Made store near Pittsburgh, Pennsylvania, followed by a location in Columbus, Ohio.

By October 2006, nine Friends 2B Made stores were operating. In 2008, Build-A-Bear announced plans to close the concept, and by October 2009 all standalone locations had either closed or been converted into Build-A-Bear Workshop stores.

Build-A-Bear began offering human clothing in the mid-2000s, primarily in the form of children's pajama sets, robes, slippers, and seasonal apparel. Archived versions of the company's online store from 2006 and 2007 include listings for kid-sized sleepwear and matching child-and-plush pajama sets, indicating that clothing for customers was available alongside the company's stuffed animal products. These products were marketed primarily toward children and represented a small extension of the company's merchandise offerings.

The Game Factory developed and released the Build-A-Bear Workshop video game for the Nintendo DS in 2007. A second game, Build-A-Bear Workshop: A Friend Fur All Seasons, was released for the Wii in 2008.

In December 2011, Build-A-Bear released a feature film for the iPad through MoPix.

From 2011 to 2013, some customers purchased Build-A-Bear accessories for household pets rather than stuffed animals, a trend that received media attention.

In 2013, Cepia, LLC settled a patent and copyright infringement lawsuit against Build-A-Bear involving a color-changing toy bear.

Founder Maxine Clark retired as chief executive officer in 2013 and was succeeded by Sharon Price John.

The company continued to expand its licensed merchandise offerings during this period, including products based on My Little Pony and One Direction.

In 2015, a lawsuit alleged that Build-A-Bear stores did not provide accessible point-of-sale equipment for blind customers.

On July 12, 2018, Build-A-Bear held its "Pay Your Age Day" promotion in the United States, Canada, and the United Kingdom, allowing children to purchase bears for the price of their age. Demand exceeded expectations, leading to long lines and store closures at many locations. Sharon Price John later apologized, and the company issued vouchers to affected customers.

In August 2018, Build-A-Bear launched Kabu, a pre-teen lifestyle brand based on Japanese kawaii-style art. The brand debuted with three characters—Kabu Pawlette, Kabu Bearnice, and Kabu Catlynn—and was accompanied by a mobile game titled Kabu Pop Party Quest.

The company launched a streaming radio station in October 2018.

In July 2019, Build-A-Bear partnered with Warner Music Group's Arts Music and Warner Chappell Music to launch a music label. Patrick Hughes and Harvey Russell joined the initiative in advisory roles.

In 2019, Build-A-Bear announced the creation of Build-A-Bear Entertainment, an in-house production division formed following an agreement with Sony Pictures Worldwide Acquisitions.

The division went on to produce several film and television projects, including The Honey Girls, Christmas CEO, and Glisten and the Merry Mission.

In 2020, the company relocated its headquarters from Overland, Missouri, to downtown St. Louis.

During the late 2010s and early 2020s, Build-A-Bear expanded its licensed merchandise offerings through partnerships with brands such as Disney, Nintendo, Pokémon, and Marvel.

During the COVID-19 pandemic, Build-A-Bear temporarily closed many of its stores and expanded its online business through e-commerce, online-exclusive products, and direct-to-consumer sales.

In the early 2020s, the company increased its focus on adult consumers through licensed merchandise, nostalgia-based products, online exclusives, and the introduction of the “After Dark” collection.

Build-A-Bear also expanded its human apparel offerings to include adult-sized sleepwear and related merchandise through its Build-A-Bear Pajama Shop.

Build-A-Bear products have also been offered through specialty retail vending machines, including a machine at Chicago Midway International Airport that carried Build-A-Bear Workshop merchandise among several featured brands.

In March 2026, Build-A-Bear announced that Sharon Price John would retire as chief executive officer. Chris Hurt succeeded her as CEO on June 11, 2026. Hurt had previously served as the company's chief operations and experience officer.

== Product mix ==
In addition to stuffed animals, Build-A-Bear Workshop has sold a variety of accessories and related merchandise, referred to by the company as "Bearaphenalia". These products have included candy, greeting cards, jewelry, stationery, stickers, and T-shirts. Some stores also featured photo booths that could convert customer photographs into stickers.

For the video game Kinectimals: Now with Bears!, Build-A-Bear released four bears with scan tags: Champ Bear, Colorful Hearts Bear, Endless Hearts Teddy, and Peace & Hearts Bear.

In January 2024, the company's online-only "After Dark" collection received media attention for its adult-oriented themes, which Build-A-Bear marketed toward adult collectors and gift buyers.

Commentators have linked the collection to the broader "kidulting" trend, in which adults purchase products associated with childhood interests and nostalgia.
