= Delbo =

2009 video game

- Developer: Beyond Interactive
- Publishers: Beyond Interactive; Neko Entertainment^{(US, EU)}
- Platforms: Web browser, Nintendo DSi, Android, iOS
- Release: Browser: WW: 2009; Nintendo DSi: JP: March 31, 2010; NA: June 23, 2011; EU: June 23, 2011; iOS: WW: October 23, 2013; Android: WW: September 25, 2013
- Genre: Puzzle
- Mode: Single-player

Delbo (Note: Japanese: デルボ, Hepburn: Derubo) is a puzzle video game developed and published by Japanese studio Beyond Interactive. Originally released as a Flash game in 2009, Delbo was later published for Nintendo DSi's DSiWare download service in 2010. Versions for Android and iOS devices were released in 2013. The objective of the game is to survive by shooting multi-colored orbs to make them crash into other orbs on the playfield.

The game received mixed reviews from critics. Although some found the gameplay addictive, they also pointed out the lack of originality.

== Gameplay ==
Nintendo DS verstion uses a "book style" design that requires holding the console on its side.

Delbo is a tile-matching video game similar to Magical Drop and Puzzle Bobble. A stack of random colored orbs descends from the top of the playfield, and a player is defeated when an orb touches the bottom of the field. The player controls a cursor that moves horizontally along the bottom of the screen and launches orbs up the screen. Additionally, it is possible to pull vertical columns toward the cursor in order to change the pattern on the field.

There are the normal orbs that can be matched and the special orbs called "link" orbs. The player's objective is match the launched orb with least 1 orb of the same color. If the player's orb doesn't touch any other orbs of the same color, it simply disappear from the field. The game doesn't have any penalty for not matching orbs. The special "link" orbs allow matching allow matching obrs of different color.

Exploding 10 or more orbs in one shot build up the "mystery meter". If it reaches its maximum value, the game rewards the player with a "mystery orb" that, when launched, destroys all the orbs of the same color that are already on the screen.

The Nintendo DSi version of the game has a plot where the player assumes the role of a young woman who was praying to bring back her deceased lover, but suddenly was surrounded by an infinite of crystal orbs. A voice from above told her that these orbs represent sins of her lover and if she destroys all of them, she will be reunited with him. Also, the DSi version uses an unusual "book style" design that requires holding the console on its side like a book.

== Development and release ==
Delbo was created in Adobe Flash by the gamedesigner Kazumasa Hamamoto and was made available at the developer's Beyond Interactive web site in 2009. The game's harpsichord soundtrack and sound effects were provided by Tsukasa Tawada.

The Nintendo DS version of the game with enhanced graphics was released on March 31, 2010, in Japan as a DSiWare digital title. In Europe and North America, the DSiWare version was published by Neko Entertainment on June 23, 2011. The Android and iOS versions were released in Autumn 2013.

== Reception ==
Reception

Review scores
Publication	Score
IGN	5.5/10
Nintendo Life	6/10
Digitally Downloaded	4/5

Delbo received a mixed response from reviewers. Zach Kaplan of Nintendo Life praised the game for its addictive gameplay and described it as "a cross between Magical Drop/Ball Fighter and Tetris Attack". However, he criticized the lack of penalty for shooting orbs of the wrong color. In a positive review for Digitally Downloaded, Matt Sainsbury said that Delbo "is good value, and a must have for anyone that enjoyed challenging and fast-paced puzzle games".

Lucas M. Thomas of IGN called the game "a poor man's Magical Drop". He called the game's "book style" design "mildly interesting", but concluded that it feels "unnecessary and uncomfortable after a while". Also he added that as a color-blind person he finds it difficult to differentiate between yellow and green orbs.
