= IndiePub =

American video game publisher

indiePub Entertainment, Inc.
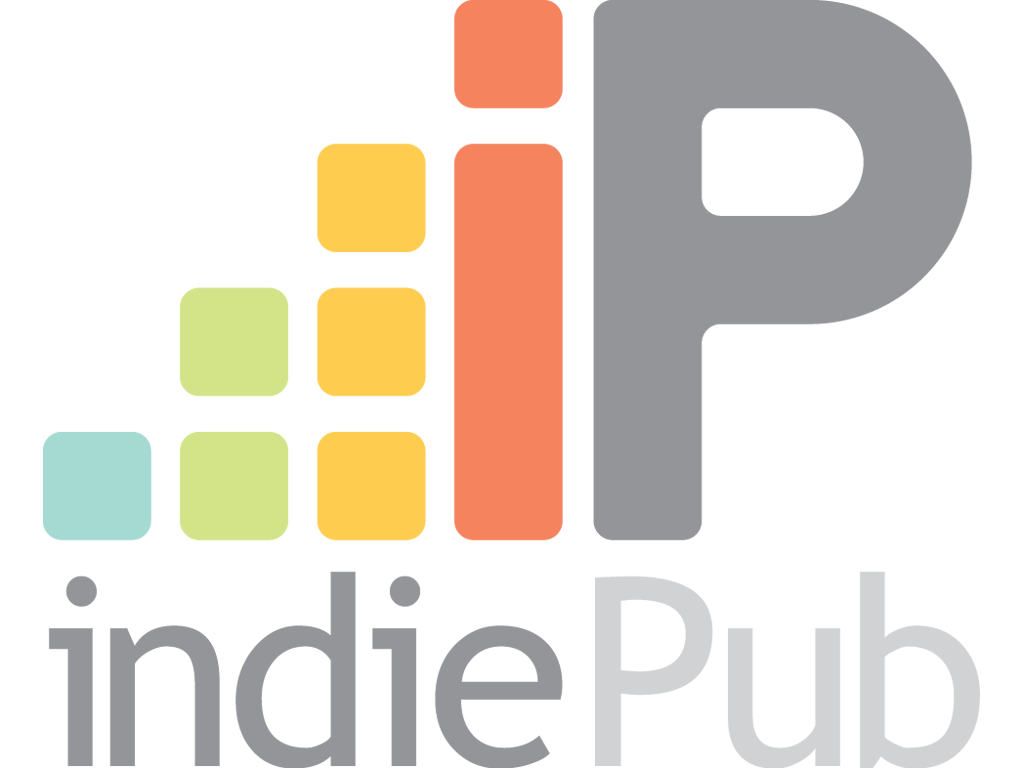
- Formerly: Zoo Entertainment (2007–2012)
- Type: Public
- Traded as: Expert Market: IPUB
- Industry: Video games
- Founded: 2007
- Defunct: November 2013
- Fate: Dissolved
- Headquarters: Cincinnati, Ohio
- Products: Games for video game consoles and digital distribution
- Revenue: ▲US$$63 million
- Operating income: ▼US$$14.5 million
- Net income: ▼US$$14 million
- Number of employees: 15
- Subsidiaries: Zoo Games, Inc. Zoo Publishing, Inc. indiePub indiePub Games indiePub Mobile

indiePub Entertainment, Inc. (formerly Zoo Entertainment, Inc.) was a publisher of video games based in Cincinnati, Ohio, United States.

== History ==
Zoo Games was a wholly owned subsidiary of Zoo Entertainment originally known as DFTW Merger Sub, Inc. In March 2007, DFTW merged with Green Screen Interactive Software, LLC to become Green Screen Interactive Software. The GreenScreen company was co-founded by former Take-Two Interactive founders Ryan Brant and Mark E. Seremet and Take-Two executive Susan Cummings. Following the merger, Green Screen acquired SuperVillain Studios in June 2007, Destination Software in December 2007 and Zoo Digital Publishing in April 2008. In August 2008, Green Screen was renamed Zoo Games, Inc., and Destination Software was renamed Zoo Publishing, Inc., with Zoo Publishing becoming a wholly owned subsidiary of Zoo Games. Ron Chaimowitz, the founder of GT Interactive was appointed CEO during the acquisitions. SuperVillain Studios was sold back to the original owners in September 2008 and six months following the acquisition of Zoo Digital Publishing it was sold back to the original owners in order for the company to refocus on their Zoo Publishing operations.

On May 7, 2009 it was announced by Zoo Publishing that the company had acquired the rights from New World IP to publish and distribute Empire Interactive's entire catalog which includes titles such as Big Mutha Truckers and Flatout Head On. The rights were acquired from New World IP who had recently purchased Empire's intellectual property as the company went into administration. In June 2009, Zoo Games created a wholly owned subsidiary, Zoo Entertainment Europe Ltd., in order to move into the European market however, operations were discontinued in December 2009.

September 28, 2011, indiePub announced that it was a year into development of an indies-only game and application (apps) distribution or publishing platform. Developers will be able to create a "Pub" (online storefront) to sell their games and apps. The following week (October 7, 2011) indiePub revealed that it would give indie developers 75% of the revenues from their games sold through the service and that it would support games and other apps made for PC (Windows), Macintosh (OS X), Linux and Android devices (phones and tablets). iOS games, can be linked from a Pub. It also claimed that it would use distributed sales tools which never were elaborated on before it was shut down.

May 15, 2012, Zoo Entertainment, Inc., officially became indiePub Entertainment, Inc.

indiePub closed in 2013.

== indiePub Games ==
Zoo Publishing is also the sponsor of indiePub Games, a community of independent video game developers. Zoo originally launched indiePub as 2Bee Games in 2009 but changed to indiePub in 2010 and periodically holds indie game development competitions with cash prizes for the best games.

Mid 2010, indiePub held its 3rd Independent Game Developers' Competition when indiePub launched. (The first two developer competitions were under 2Bee Games). Winners were announced October 8, 2010, at the Game Developers Conference (GDC) Online in Austin, Texas (USA). The winners were:

- Grand Prize: Dustforce! by Hitbox Team developers Woodley Nye, Matthew Bush and Alexander Dostal in Brisbane, Australia.
- Technical Excellence: Hazard: The Journey of Life by Alexander Bruce.
- Best Art: The Dream Machine created by Cockroach Inc. developers Anders Gustafsson and Erik Zaring from Denmark and Sweden.
- Best Audio: Coma by Thomas Brush.
- Best Design: Vanessa Saint-Pierre Delacroix and Her Nightmare by Bad Pilcrow.
- Staff Pick: Catapult for Hire by developer Tyrone Henrie of PixelMega.

Mid to late 2010, indiePub held a Mobile Game Competition. The winners were announced December 15, 2011:

- Grand Prize: SteamBirds for Android (Spry Fox and Radial Games)
- Art: PLEXXR for iOS (Tactile Media)
- Audio: Spark It Up for iOS(sumiguchi)
- Design: SKWER for iOS (Alebrije Studios)
- Technical Excellence: Hero Mages for Android (D20Studios)

Early 2011 indiePub held an indie game developer competition called the Independent Propeller Awards and featured $150,000 in prizes, an award sponsored by Unity Technologies and an award sponsored by Intel AppUp developer program. Winners were announced on March 13, 2011, at the ScreenBurn Arcade, the gaming portion of the 2011 South by Southwest event in Austin, Texas (USA). The winners were:

- Grand Prize: GLiD (Glid) by Spiderling Game Studios
- Best Art: The Uncanny Fish Hunt by Uncanny Games
- Best Audio: Skinny by Thomas Brush
- Best Design: Chewy by Happy Candy Co.
- Technical Excellence: Creo by Turtle Sandbox
- Intel Innovation Award: Deep Sea by Robin Arnott of WRAUGHK Audio Design
- Unity Development Award: Tiny and Big: Grandpa's Leftovers by Black Pants Game Studio

Late in 2011 indiePub started their fifth indie game developer competition called the 2012 Independent Propeller Awards and featured $50,000 in prizes. Winners were announced on April 18, 2012.

The winners were:

- Grand Prize: Deity by DigiPen's Double++ (Ryan Chew, Caroline Sugianto, Michael Travaglione, Christopher Mingus, Ying Liu, Matt Frederick, Aariel Hall and Ryan Hickman)
- Best Art: The Bridge by Ty Taylor and Mario Castaneda
- Best Audio: The Red Solstice by IronWard (Hrvoje Horvatek, Daniel Mandić, Marko Pintera, Vjeko Koščević, Danijel Ribić and Marko Kovačić with audio by Andy Mack, Cory Richards, Žarko Dragojević and Dominik Zorić)
- Best Design: FYI by Digital Dreams (Geert Nellen, Thijmen Bink and Roy van de Mortel)
- Technical Excellence: Nitronic Rush by DigiPen's Team Nitronic (Kyle Holdwick, Andy Kibler, Chris Barrett, Andrew "Angrew" Nollan, Jason Nollan, Laura Borgen, Eddie Peters, Ariel Gitomer, Nathan Aldrich, Jordan Hemenway and M.J. "The Quiggles" Quigley)
- Mobile Game: CreaVures by MuseGames (Howard Tsao and Conrad Kreyling)

In 2013, indiePub Games closed with all the subsidiaries of indiePub.

== indiePub Mobile ==
February 1, 2011, Zoo Entertainment, Inc., announced that it launched indiePub Mobile to develop mobile games for iOS and Android. EA Mobile's former Development Director, Rob Cassidy, was named indiePub Mobile Director. Initially announced mobile games were: Fractal, Blocks: The Devilish Delivery Game (renamed Kona's Crate), Paper Venture, Totem Destroyer Deluxe (HD) and Cargo Delivery. According to the company, this was the first time an indie game publisher has expanded with a designated mobile division.

In 2013, indiePub Mobile closed with all the subsidiaries of indiePub.

== Games ==
This is a list of games published under the Zoo Games label and, further below, under indiePub. For the games published by Destination Software before it was acquired; see List of Destination Software games.

=== Released (Zoo Publishing) ===
2008

- Army Men: Soldiers of Misfortune (2008) Nintendo DS, PlayStation 2, Wii
- Bigfoot: Collision Course (2008) Nintendo DS, Wii, Windows
- Calvin Tucker's Redneck Jamboree (2008) Wii, Windows
- Chrysler Classic Racing (2008) Nintendo DS, Windows
- M&M's Adventure (2008) Nintendo DS, PlayStation 2, Wii
- Margot's Word Brain (2008) Nintendo DS, PlayStation 2, Wii, Windows
- NARC (2008) Windows
- Order Up! (2008) Wii
- Puzzler Collection (2008) Nintendo DS, Wii
- Skate City Heroes (2008) Wii
- Story Hour: Adventures (2008) Wii
- Story Hour: Fairy Tales (2008) Wii
- Twin Strike: Operation Thunder (2008) Wii
- Wordmaster (2008) Nintendo DS

2009

- Animal Paradise Wild (2009) Nintendo DS
- Arcade Shooting Gallery (2009) Wii
- ATV Quad Kings (2009) Wii
- Build 'n Race (2009) Wii
- Chrysler Classic Racing (2009) Nintendo DS, Wii
- Chicken Blaster (2009) Nintendo DS, Wii
- Deal or No Deal (2009) Wii
- Diner Dash: Flo on the Go (2009) Nintendo DS
- Dodge Racing: Charger vs. Challenger (2009) Nintendo DS, Wii
- Dream Dance & Cheer (2009) Wii
- Dream Dancer (2009) Nintendo DS
- Dream Salon (2009) Nintendo DS
- Glacier 2 (2009) Wii
- Groovin' Blocks (2009) iPhone, Wii
- Hello Kitty: Big City Dreams (2009) Nintendo DS
- Jelly Belly: Ballistic Beans (2009) Nintendo DS, PlayStation 2, Wii
- Love Is... In Bloom (2009) Nintendo DS
- Margot's Bepuzzled! (2009) Nintendo DS
- M&M's Beach Party (2009) Wii
- Monster Trucks Mayhem (2009) Wii
- Pacific Liberator (2009) Wii
- Puzzle Kingdoms (2009) Nintendo DS, Wii
- Smiley World Island Challenge (2009) Nintendo DS, Wii
- Ultimate Duck Hunting (2009) Wii
- Wedding Dash (2009) Nintendo DS

2010

- Boot Camp Academy (2010) Wii
- Chocolatier (2010) Nintendo DS
- Color Cross (2010) Nintendo DS
- Dream Chronicles (2010) Nintendo DS
- The Garfield Show: Threat of the Space Lasagna (2010) Wii
- Glacier 3: The Meltdown (2010) Wii
- Martian Panic (2010) Wii
- Hello Kitty: Birthday Adventures (2010) Nintendo DS
- Hall of Fame: Ultimate Hoops Challenge (2010) Wii
- Jane's Hotel (2010) Nintendo DS
- Let's Paint (2010) Wii
- Monster Frenzy (2010) Nintendo DS
- Speed (2010) Wii
- Minute to Win It (2010) Wii
- Shawn Johnson Gymnastics (2010) Wii
- Mathews Bowhunt (2010) Wii
- Hello Kitty Seasons (2010) Wii
- Kevin VanDam's Big Bass Challenge (2010) Wii
- Silly Bandz (2010) Nintendo DS

2011

- Dino Strike (February 2011) Wii
- Mayhem 3D (March 2011) Xbox 360
- Mayhem 3D (March 2011) PS3
- Photo Phantasy (February 2011) DS
- ZombieZ Seeker (February 2011) DS
- Minute to Win It for Kinect (October 18, 2011) Xbox 360

=== Released (indiePub & indiePub Mobile & indiePub Entertainment) ===
2010

- Silly Bandz (December 21, 2010) iPhone, iPad

2011

- Kona's Crate (June 23, 2011) iOS (iPhone, iPod Touch, iPad), Windows, Mac
- Fractal (August 18, 2011) iPad
- Totem Destroyer Deluxe (October 2011) Windows, Mac

2012

- Vessel (March 1, 2012) Windows
- Fireburst (April 25, 2012) Windows
- Diamond Trust of London (July 2012) DS
- Pictago (October 26, 2012, Canada) iOS
- Pictago (December 21, 2012, US) iOS
- Turkey Stuffin' (November 9–15, 2012) iOS, Android

2013

- Auditorium (January 9, 2013) PlayStation Network
- Capsized+ (February 28, 2013) iOS (iPad)
- Pictago (February 13, 2013) iOS
- Hungry Gows (March 7, 2013) iOS
- Kona's Crate (March 7, 2013) Android
- Bad Bots (May 17, 2013) Windows, Mac
- Storm (June 14, 2013) Xbox Live
- Fireburst (June 14, 2013) Xbox Live
- Storm (June 18, 2013) PlayStation Network (US)
- Storm (June 27, 2013) Windows
- Capsized (July 5, 2013) Xbox Live

2014

- Vessel (March 12, 2014) PlayStation Network

Announced - Cancelled games

- Storm (2013) iOS
- Catapult for Hire (video game) (2013) Windows
- Bad Bots (2013) iOS, Android
- Stunt Flyer 3D (Unknown) 3DS
