= Bill Rogers (voice actor) =

American voice actor

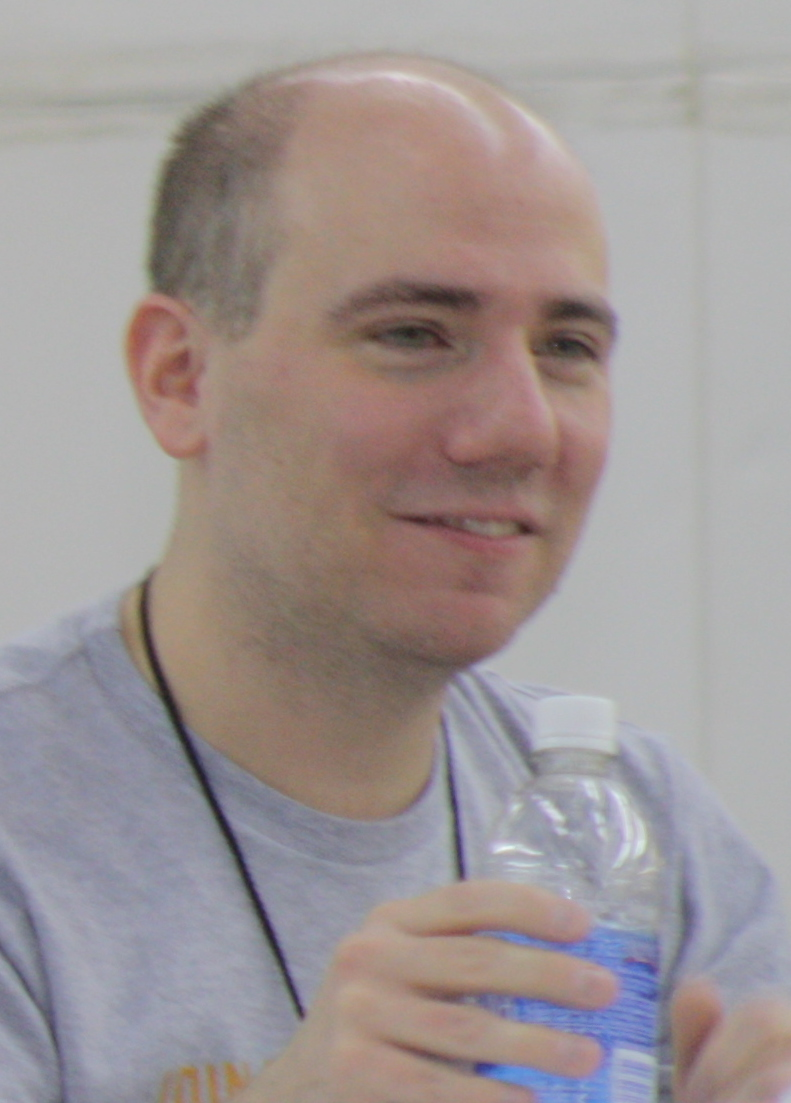
- Rogers at the Florida Supercon in 2009
- Born: William Rogers
- Occupation: Voice actor
- Years active: 2001–present
- Website: billsvoice.net

William Rogers is an American voice actor who primarily worked in the New York area for several years before moving to Los Angeles in 2015/2016.

He has done work for various studios such as DuArt Film and Video, Ocon Animation Studios, Headline Studios, New Generation Pictures and Bang Zoom! Entertainment.

== Career ==
Rogers began his voice over career in 2001, with the anime series Assemble Insert.

He has worked on various dubs, and in stage productions, including Boogiepop Phantom as Anno, Cells at Work! as Pseudomonas Aeruginosa, Comic Party as Otaku, Genshiken as Tanaka Soichiro, Gokudo as Soldier, His and Her Circumstances as Pero Pero and Mr. Arima, Hunter x Hunter (2011) as Meleoron and Majitani, Ikki Tousen: Dragon Destiny as Gakushuu, Narrator and Toutasu, To Heart as Imai, Ikki Tousen: Xtreme Xecutor as Red Dragon Sousou and Shuhou, K.O. Beast as Shaba and Kuroko's Basketball as Shinsuke Kimura.

Rogers is best known for voicing Tohma Seguchi in Gravitation and for voicing Brock, Drew and various other characters in the English dub of the long running anime series Pokémon, since Season 9.

Other characters he voiced including Old Mage and Vuan in Legend of Lemnear, All Back-Man, Groribas and Tongue Stretcher in One-Punch Man, Bruno in Pokémon Generations, Elf Elder in Queen's Blade, Kanata Myouken in Shingu: Secret of the Stellar Wars, Various characters in The Third: The Girl with the Blue Eye and Wheeljack in Transformers: War for Cybertron Trilogy.

He has also provided various character voices in numerous video games, including Bullet Witch, Red M&M and Yellow M&M in M&M's Kart Racing and M&M's Adventure, Lucario, Bonsly and Weavile in Super Smash Bros. Brawl, Heathcliff in Heathcliff: The Fast and the Furriest, Urien in Street Fighter V, King Rhoam Bosphoramus Hyrule in The Legend of Zelda: Breath of the Wild, Victor Franson in Dark Rose Valkyrie, and Dredge and Dark Lord Torvald in Paladins.

In addition to voice acting, he is also a voice director and a scriptwriter.

== Filmography ==
=== Film ===
- Batman: Knightfall - Part One: Knightfall - Gino, Tony, Guards
- Pokémon Ranger and the Temple of the Sea – Brock, Sceptile, Corphish
- Pokémon: The Rise of Darkrai – Brock, Sudowoodo, Croagunk, Darkrai
- Pokémon: Giratina & the Sky Warrior – Brock, Chimchar, Sudowoodo, Croagunk
- Pokémon: Arceus and the Jewel of Life – Brock, Monferno, Sudowoodo, Croagunk
- Pokémon: Zoroark: Master of Illusions – Brock, Infernape, Sudowoodo, Croagunk
- Pokémon the Movie: Kyurem vs. the Sword of Justice – Stunfisk
- Pokémon the Movie: Genesect and the Legend Awakened – Stunfisk
- Pet Pals in Windland – Cuncun
- Pokémon the Movie: I Choose You! – Lucario, Additional voices
- Godzilla: Planet of the Monsters – Additional voices
- Pokémon the Movie: The Power of Us – Sudowoodo, Additional voices
- Pokémon: Mewtwo Strikes Back—Evolution – Brock
- Pororo: Cyberspace Adventure Poby, Crong (voice, uncredited)
- Pororo, the Snow Fairy Village Adventure Poby, Crong, Lava Monster (voice, uncredited)

=== Anime ===
- Assemble Insert – Prime Minister, Additional voices
- Boogiepop Phantom – Anno, Officer Yamamoto, Takashi, Yasushi Sanada
- Cells at Work! – Pseudomonas Aeruginosa
- Comic Party – Otaku
- Genshiken – Tanaka Soichiro
- Gokudo – Soldier
- Gravitation – Tohma Seguchi
- His and Her Circumstances – Pero Pero, Mr. Arima, Additional voices
- Hunter x Hunter (2011) – Meleoron, Majitani
- Ikki Tousen: Dragon Destiny – Gakushuu, Narrator, Toutasu
- Ikki Tousen: Xtreme Xecutor – Red Dragon Sousou, Shuhou
- K.O. Beast – Shaba
- Kuroko's Basketball - Shinsuke Kimura, Itsuku Matsumoto
- Legend of Lemnear – Old Mage, Vuan
- One-Punch Man – All Back-Man, Groribas, Tongue Stretcher
- Pokémon – Brock, Drew, Ghetsis, Scott, Magikarp salesman, Dome Ace Tucker, Additional voices
- Pokémon Generations – Bruno
- Queen's Blade – Elf Elder
- Shingu: Secret of the Stellar Wars – Kanata Myouken
- The Third: The Girl with the Blue Eye – Various characters
- To Heart – Imai
- Transformers: War for Cybertron Trilogy – Wheeljack

=== Non-anime ===
- Elerctro Cute! – Announcer, Booklet, Yarn Dog
- The Frappinos – Nevillea Kirn
- Never Among Friends – Restaurant Patron (uncredited)
- Robot Trains – Kay
- Tarchin and Friends – Kakule

=== Video games ===
List of voice and dubbing performances in video games
Year	Title	Role	Source
2007	Bullet Witch	Additional voices	
2007	M&M's Kart Racing	Red, Orange, Blue, Yellow	
2008	Super Smash Bros. Brawl	Lucario, Bonsly, Weavile	
2008	M&M's Adventure	Red, Yellow, Uncle Sam	
2010	PokéPark Wii: Pikachu's Adventure	Empoleon, Croagunk	
2010	Heathcliff: The Fast and the Furriest	Heathcliff	
2016	Demon Gaze	Maury, Zubo, Kuro	
2016	Street Fighter V	Urien	
2017	The Legend of Zelda: Breath of the Wild	King Rhoam Bosphoramus Hyrule	
2017	Dark Rose Valkyrie	Victor Franson	
2017	Demon Gaze II	Canis	
2018	Detective Pikachu	Brad McMaster	
2018	Paladins	Dredge, Dark Lord Torvald	
2018	Epic Seven	Krau, Sven	
2019	Mr Love: Queen's Choice	Lucien	
2020	Hyrule Warriors: Age of Calamity	King Rhoam Bosphoramus Hyrule	
2021	Demon Slayer: Kimetsu no Yaiba – The Hinokami Chronicles	Additional voices	
2022	Relayer	Captain Gillian	
2023	Octopath Traveler II	Additional voices	
2023	Detective Pikachu Returns	Brad McMaster	
2024	Sand Land	Doctor Posé	
2024	Ys X: Nordics	René Rusveri, Captain LaSalle	
2025	Dynasty Warriors: Origins	Xun You	

== Production credits ==
=== Voice director ===
- Queen's Blade: Beautiful Warriors
- Trillion: God of Destruction
- Mai Mai Miracle (Assistant Voice Direction)

=== Script adaptation ===
- Street Fighter V
- Trillion: God of Destruction

=== Producer ===
- The Frappinos
- Dark Passages
