= M&M's Break' Em =

2007 video game

- Game Boy Advance version cover art, featuring all five M&M's playable characters
- Developer: Frame Studios Interactive
- Publishers: NA: Destination Software; UK: Zoo Digital Publishing
- Producer: Aeron Guy
- Programmers: Marco Pacifico; Thomas Maniero
- Composer: Simone Cicconi
- Platforms: Game Boy Advance, Nintendo DS
- Release: Game Boy Advance: NA: February 6, 2007; Nintendo DS: NA: March 25, 2007; UK: July 27, 2007
- Genre: Puzzle
- Modes: Single-player, multiplayer

M&M's Break' Em is a 2007 puzzle video game developed by Frame Studios Interactive and published by Destination Software for the Game Boy Advance (GBA) and the Nintendo DS. The game is similar to Gem Smashers, a 2003 title by the same developer, featuring tile-breaking gameplay.

The game's story mode revolves around controlling one of five M&M's with constant vertical movement, completing various levels—by destroying crystals to free other M&M's, avoiding hazards, and fighting bosses—in order to defeat Mr. Runch, a rotten and dangerous peanut determined to become an M&M. In addition to this single-player campaign, the game features a local multiplayer mode, wherein two players compete to break more crystals.

M&M's Break' Em is the fifth M&M's video game, succeeding M&M's Blast!, a 2001 title for the GBA. The game received mixed reviews from critics and was followed by M&M's Kart Racing, a kart racing game released for the Wii in 2007 and for the DS in 2008.

== Gameplay ==
In the single-player game mode (left), one player completes a series of levels under a time limit. In the multiplayer mode (right), two players compete to break more crystals.

M&M's Break' Em is a puzzle video game with gameplay based on that of Gem Smashers (2003), another puzzle game developed by Frame Studios Interactive. To complete the single-player game mode, the player must clear a series of levels in areas such as a forest, an underwater environment, and a tropical island. Areas and levels are chosen from a map, with orange spots representing normal levels and blue spots indicating levels that feature a boss, which must be unlocked by completing every normal level in the area. Extra levels, represented by pink spots, can be unlocked by finding hidden keys in other levels.

The player character is one of five different-colored M&M's (Red, Yellow, Blue, Green, or Orange), which vary in speed and power. The controls are the same regardless of which color is chosen: The M&M constantly moves vertically and bounces off objects, eliminating any crystals that match its color and freeing the M&M's trapped inside. The color of the player's M&M can be changed by bumping into color pots or blocks, which can be hidden, especially in later levels. In both the Game Boy Advance (GBA) and Nintendo DS versions of the game, the player uses the console's D-pad to move left and right, with the DS version allowing the player to also use the touchscreen to control their M&M's horizontal movement. The sensitivity of the touchscreen can be adjusted in the menu. Pressing the A button or the R button speeds up the M&M's movements, while pressing the B button or the L button slows them down.

To complete each level, the player must reach the exit door, which must first be opened by knocking out every crystal. The player can collect power-ups with positive or negative effects, such as increasing or decreasing the speed of their M&M or temporarily reversing its controls. Miscellaneous power-ups include a detonator that explodes all crystals matching its color if collected, a potion that provides temporary invincibility, and an item that multiplies the time bonus at the end of a level by a multiplier between two and eight. Skull blocks must be avoided, as bumping into one causes the player to instantly lose a life. The player begins the game with a set number of lives and continues, and once all of them have been used, each loss results in a game over, after which the game can be resumed with only one life. Extra lives can be earned by collecting a large number of points.

Each level features a timer, and if the player does not complete the level in time, a bouncing skull begins pursuing their M&M in an attempt to destroy it, which results in the loss of a life. Occasionally, a level ends with a battle against a large boss that must be defeated. Bosses can be damaged only by colliding with one of its physical aspects, such as an anglerfish's lure, while it matches the color of the player's M&M.

In addition to the single-player campaign, there is a local multiplayer game mode, in which two players compete to break more crystals in two stages. This mode requires each player to have their own copy of the game.

== Plot ==
A dangerous outlaw known as Mr. Runch has landed on planet Crunch, determined to become one of the M&M's. As Mr. Runch is declared "much too bitter" to be an M&M and belongs "in the reject bin", five M&M's board ships and blast off to the planet. Upon landing, the M&M's discover that Mr. Runch is using a device to trap the planet's inhabitants in crystals, supposedly to kidnap the M&M's and use them to coat his rotten skin in a special chocolate coating. After the M&M's defeat Mr. Runch in a boss battle within the final level, the group leaves him trapped in a crystal, saving the rest of the M&M's.

== Development and release ==
M&M's Break' Em was published by Destination Software. The game was developed by Frame Studios Interactive, an independent video game developer located in Belluno, Italy. Frame Studios had previously created Gem Smashers, an action puzzle game first released for the GBA in 2003, which revolves around completing single-screen levels by destroying gems that match the color of the player character. Much like M&M's Break' Em, Gem Smashers involves controlling a vertically bouncing orb and avoiding hazards to complete each level.

M&M's Break' Em was released in North America for the GBA on February 6, 2007, and for the Nintendo DS on March 25, 2007. The game was also published by Zoo Digital Publishing in the United Kingdom on July 27, 2007. It is the first M&M's game to be released for the DS, as well as the fifth M&M's game overall, succeeding the 2001 GBA title M&M's Blast!. The next M&M's title, the kart racing game M&M's Kart Racing, was released for the Wii in 2007 and for the DS in 2008.

== Reception ==
Reception

Aggregate score
Aggregator	Score
GameRankings	56%

Review scores
Publication	Score
IGN	5/10
GameZone	3.4/10
Nintendojo	7.9/10

On the video game review aggregation website GameRankings, M&M's Break' Em received a 56% ranking based on four critic reviews. Reception toward the gameplay was mixed. IGN's Chris Adams wrote that the gameplay was "a nice blend of casual controls and deeper gameplay mechanics", and complimented the inclusion of boss battles as being "pretty unique" for a puzzle game, despite noting repetition in the fights. Aaron Roberts of Nintendojo praised "exciting gameplay and the familiar charm of the M&M's characters", whereas Mike David of GameZone criticized the gameplay as being too easy.

Critics were also divided on the visuals and audio. IGN offered a more negative response toward these subjects, describing the art as "half-assed" and the sprites as "ugly and poorly rendered", in addition to deeming the music and sound effects "barely noticeable". IGN further noted that every time an M&M is knocked out, it flies toward the screen and briefly obscures the player character, potentially causing the player to lose track of them. GameZone also criticized the graphics and audio, stating that the former were "pretty poor to look at" and referring to the latter as "more of an afterthought than anything", as well as noting a lack of voice acting for the characters. Nintendojo also acknowledged the absence of voice work in the cutscenes, though wrote that the background music was "quite appropriate and actually fairly enjoyable", while offering additional praise toward the backgrounds for being detailed and changing with each world to illustrate the player's progress.

Miscellaneous criticism was directed toward the multiplayer game mode, which IGN referred to as "not very creative" and criticized for its requirement of multiple game cartridges, as well as the continue system, which Nintendojo believed was "[t]he only real flaw in the game" due to difficulty in obtaining lives. Both IGN and Nintendojo stated that the touchscreen controls offered by the DS version were less precise than the D-pad, with the former believing that the bottom screen could have instead been used to expand levels and avoid repetition. Moreover, IGN noted that aside from the player character being an M&M, an M&M character appearing on the right of the top screen, and a large image of candy appearing on the bottom screen, the game "has almost nothing to do with M&Ms candy". GameZone opined that the game "has no redeeming qualities" and was "[n]ot much more then [sic] a commercial for M&M's, only not as much fun".

== See also ==
- List of Game Boy Advance games
- List of Nintendo DS games
- List of puzzle video games
- 2007 in video games
