= Darkened Skye =

2002 video game

- Windows cover art
- Developer: Boston Animation
- Publishers: Simon & Schuster Interactive; Oxygen Interactive (PAL PC); TDK Mediactive Europe (PAL GCN)
- Platforms: Windows, GameCube
- Release: Windows: NA: January 28, 2002; PAL: July 2003; GameCube: NA: November 12, 2002; PAL: May 30, 2003
- Genres: Third-person shooter, action-adventure
- Mode: Single-player

Darkened Skye is a 2002 action-adventure game developed by Boston Animation. The game was also packaged with Outlaw Golf. Its title character is a young woman named Skye who lives in a fantasy realm searching for her mother. She can perform magic using Skittles candies as well as use her staff as a melee weapon; her staff becomes an energy weapon when used in conjunction with the Skittles. The game was released for Microsoft Windows and GameCube in North America in 2002 and the PAL regions in 2003.

== Gameplay ==
Gameplay of Darkened Skye

The game begins on a path in the forest of Lynlora near a village and moves to many settings, such as the gloomy Ogmire Archipelago and the drowned city and dungeon of the same name; Tikniki Swamp, which has a maze and a scene of riding shotgun on a giant turtle which you cannot steer; a fleet of balloons called the Sky Pirates' Camp; the Chinese-style land of Zen'Jai with lava rivers, three dragon lairs, of various elemental affinities, and the Warlord's Palace, which is like a maze; Stone Heath, with three combination-lock puzzles located in ancient stone circles; a multi-story dungeon called the Goblins' Lair; the Bone Lands, which surround a lava lake; a vampires' necropolis called the Gargoyle Cemetery, which leads to a Cathedral taken over by the enemy and a giant collapsed staircase in the Bell Tower; and a sky full of floating stones leading to Necroth's Realm and his Lair. There is a short puzzle in a miniature village along a stream, called Twell Country.

Skye suffers from a fear of drowning, so the game involves much jumping over water hazards, especially prevalent in Ogmire. There are also many puzzles of avoiding falling from great heights. It has an arcade sequence of riding a fantasy beast through underground chambers without falling into lava pits or crashing into rock formations.

The general tone of the game is juvenile-friendly and lightly comedic; defeated creatures melt away and the game is not particularly gory. One of the aids that the game provides the player is that past dialogue is accessible. Also, it contains a notebook which keeps track of what the player is searching for at any given point in the plot.

=== Licensing ===
The magic system is based on the use of Skittles candy. Skye performs different magic spells by using various combinations of colored Skittles. She can perform non-combat spells like seeing invisible items, firewalking, floating, temporarily nullifying petrification spells, shrinking, reviving dead creatures, creating a protective field, increasing the firepower of the attacks spells, and turning ordinary people into mages (though she will only get to perform that spell on her mother). Attack spells range from light beams, fireballs, iceballs, lightning, confusion, and a spell that specifically destroys undead creatures (the only means to permanently kill a vampire). Skittles have limited, though slowly regenerating, quantities of Mana. When their mana is depleted, no spells can be performed with them and they have a dulled color. They regenerate mana over time, but mana can be replenished quickly by picking up blue power-ups. Available spells depend on the quantity of Skittles Skye collects throughout the game.

== Plot ==
=== Setting ===
The game takes place in The Five Worlds: Lynlora, Ogmire, Zen'Jai, Stoneheath, and The Gorgoyle Realms.

=== Characters ===
The protagonist of Darkened Skye is Skye, a shepherd who wants to get more enjoyment out of life, and is voiced by Linda Larkin. Her companion is a sarcastic gargoyle named Draak, who decided to rage against the game's villain, the evil wizard Necroth, and is voiced by Robb Pruitt.

== Development ==
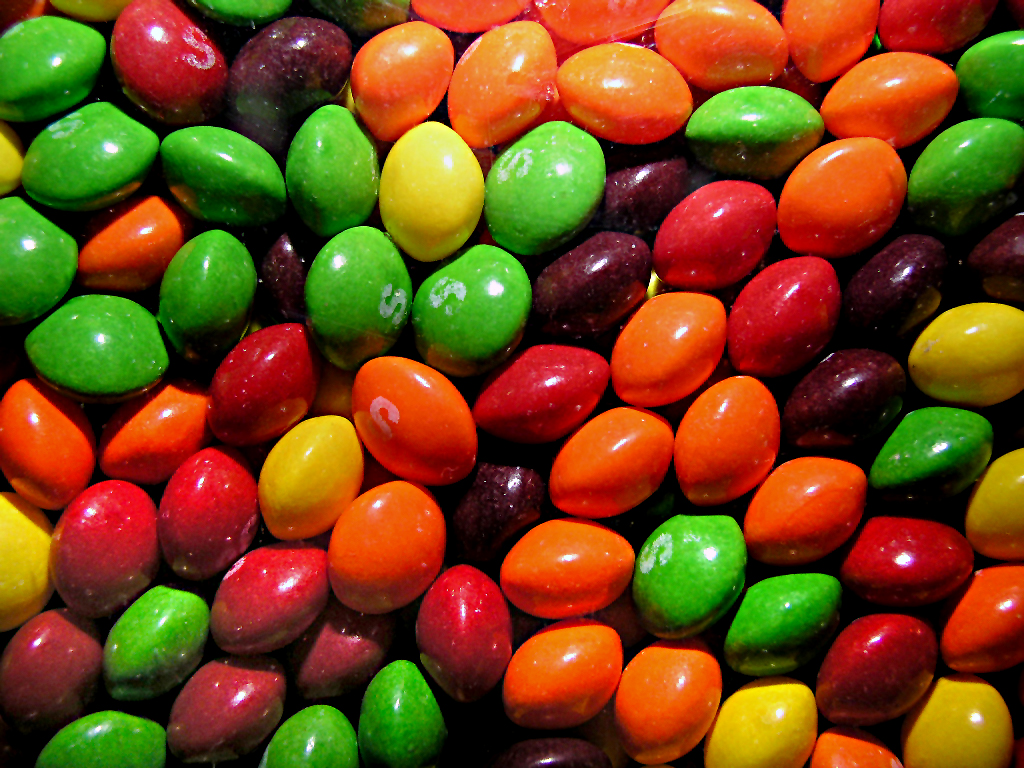
The game is based on the Skittles brand.

Publisher Simon & Schuster Interactive wanted to develop games based on M&M's given how recognized the candy characters were. While negotiating with Mars, Inc., Simon & Schuster also talked about using Skittles, which would be a back-up plan in case M&M's ended up unavailable. Eventually Mars gave the license to both brands, with the Skittles one being inspired by the assumption that a computer game based on Skittles could make the brand more popular as the confectionary's consumption declined with people older than 20. After the M&M's video games sold well, producer Elizabeth Braswell was asked to develop the Skittles game. While she first refused the job, Braswell eventually decided to work on it by focusing on gameplay and humor. A 300-page script, by lead writer and designer Andy Wolfendon, was written and submitted to Mars, which only asked to change a joke, utterances of "damn" and "remove all the snakes from the game." When Braswell asked for clarification, they said that there could be snake-like creatures, but no actual snakes.

Executive Producer Dale DeSharone stated the game's concepts were inspired by the Skittles television commercials of the "Taste the Rainbow" campaign. DeSharone led a team of over 50 people in Kyiv across two years, working on Darkened Skye simultaneously with M&M's The Lost Formulas. By the time Darkened Skye was finished, Simon & Schuster considered removing the Skittles association, but the developers already incorporated the candy into the gameplay and in-game text, so it ended up with only no references to Skittles on the box cover. Boston Animation largely outsourced the development and programming to a team based in Ukraine.

The PC version was shipped in January 2002, while the GameCube version was released in November the same year.

== Reception ==
Reception

Aggregate score
Aggregator	Score	
Aggregator	GameCube	PC
Metacritic	61/100	65/100

Review scores
Publication	Score	
Publication	GameCube	PC
Computer Games Magazine	N/A	3.5/5
Computer Gaming World	N/A	2.5/5
Game Informer	6.75 out of 10	N/A
GameRevolution	N/A	C
GameSpot	6.6 out of 10	7.3 out of 10
GameSpy	N/A	73%
GameZone	6.5 out of 10	N/A
IGN	6 out of 10	7 out of 10
Nintendo Power	2.5 out of 5	N/A
PC Gamer (US)	N/A	65%
X-Play	3/5	N/A

Darkened Skye received "mixed" reviews on both platforms according to the review aggregation website Metacritic.

The gameplay was compared to games like Tomb Raider and Star Fox Adventures. Game Informer's Matthew Kato stated that he liked the magic system while calling the combat "painfully average".

The reaction to the game's product placement was mixed. GameRevolution's Johnny Lui said its use was clever and more creative than other games use of advertisement. Writing for Computer Gaming World, Erik Wolpaw called the game great in terms of being a Skittles game. CNNMoney, however, called the use of Skittles in the game "the most blatant product placement since Chap Stick in those commercials for The Mothman Prophecies."

GameTrailers placed Darkened Skye as number two in their "Top 10 Shameless Licensed Games", behind Chase the Chuck Wagon for the Atari 2600. GamesRadar had the game in their "Worst Mash-Ups" list, while the appearance of Skittles was part of their list of worst product cameos in gaming.
