= M&M's =

Brand of chocolate candy

M&M Confections
- Logo used since 2022

- Current owner: Mars Inc.
- Country: United States
- Introduced: September 10, 1941; 85 years ago
- Related brands: Minstrels, Revels, Treets
- Markets: Worldwide (more than 100 countries)
- Website: mms.com

M&M's is a brand of sugar-coated dragée chocolate confectionery made by the Mars Wrigley Confectionery division of Mars Inc. since 1941. The confection has a dyed candy shell protecting its chocolate or variety filling from melting. Each piece has the serif letter "m" printed in white lower case on one side. The candies are produced in various bright colors and mixed together in a package.

The original M&M's candy had a semi-sweet chocolate filling that, upon introduction of other varieties, was branded as the "plain, normal" variety. The first alternate variety to be introduced was the Peanut M&M in 1954. It featured a peanut coated in milk chocolate and finally, coated with a candy shell. It still remains a regular variety. Numerous other varieties have been introduced, some of which are regular widespread varieties (peanut butter, almond, pretzel, crispy, dark chocolate, and caramel) while other varieties are limited in duration or geographic availability.

Chocolate confections were introduced in 1941 by M&M Limited in Newark, New Jersey

The confection came into production in the United States in 1941 and has since been sold in more than 100 countries. It was conceived in partnership between Forrest Mars and Bruce Murrie (representing the "M" and "M"), the son of the president of the rival Hershey Chocolate Company. Murrie sold his minority share in the venture to Mars in 1949. M&M was likely inspired from Smarties that Mars may have encountered during the Spanish Civil War (1936–1939). A sugar coating made it possible to carry chocolate in warm climates without it melting and that characteristic eventually prompted his company's longest-lasting marketing slogan that became, "the milk chocolate that melts in your mouth, not in your hand".

== History ==
=== 1940–70s: Beginnings ===
In the 1930s, Forrest Mars Sr., son of the Mars Company founder, Franklin Clarence Mars, saw soldiers in the Spanish Civil War eating Smarties, a British candy then made by Rowntree's. The candy has a chocolate interior protected by a colored shell of hard panning (hardened sugar syrup), preventing the chocolate confection from melting.

On March 3, 1941 in the United States, Mars received a patent for his own process. When his confection company was founded it was entitled, M&M Limited. The two Ms represent the last names of Forrest E. Mars Sr. and Bruce Murrie, the son of the Hershey Chocolate Company president, William F. R. Murrie, who had a 20 percent share in the product. The arrangement allowed the candies to be made with Hershey chocolate, as at the time, Hershey had control of the rationed chocolate in USA. Production of the confection began in 1941 in a factory located at 285 Badger Avenue in Clinton Hill, Newark, New Jersey.

Nestlé archives note that George Harris of Rowntree did not attempt to sue Mars for stealing the concept for Smarties and that after much negotiation, Harris and Forrest Mars Sr. agreed to share the marketplace rather than to compete, with Rowntree making Mars Bars in Canada, Ireland, and South Africa and with Mars making the sugar-coated confection in the United States without competition from Smarties.

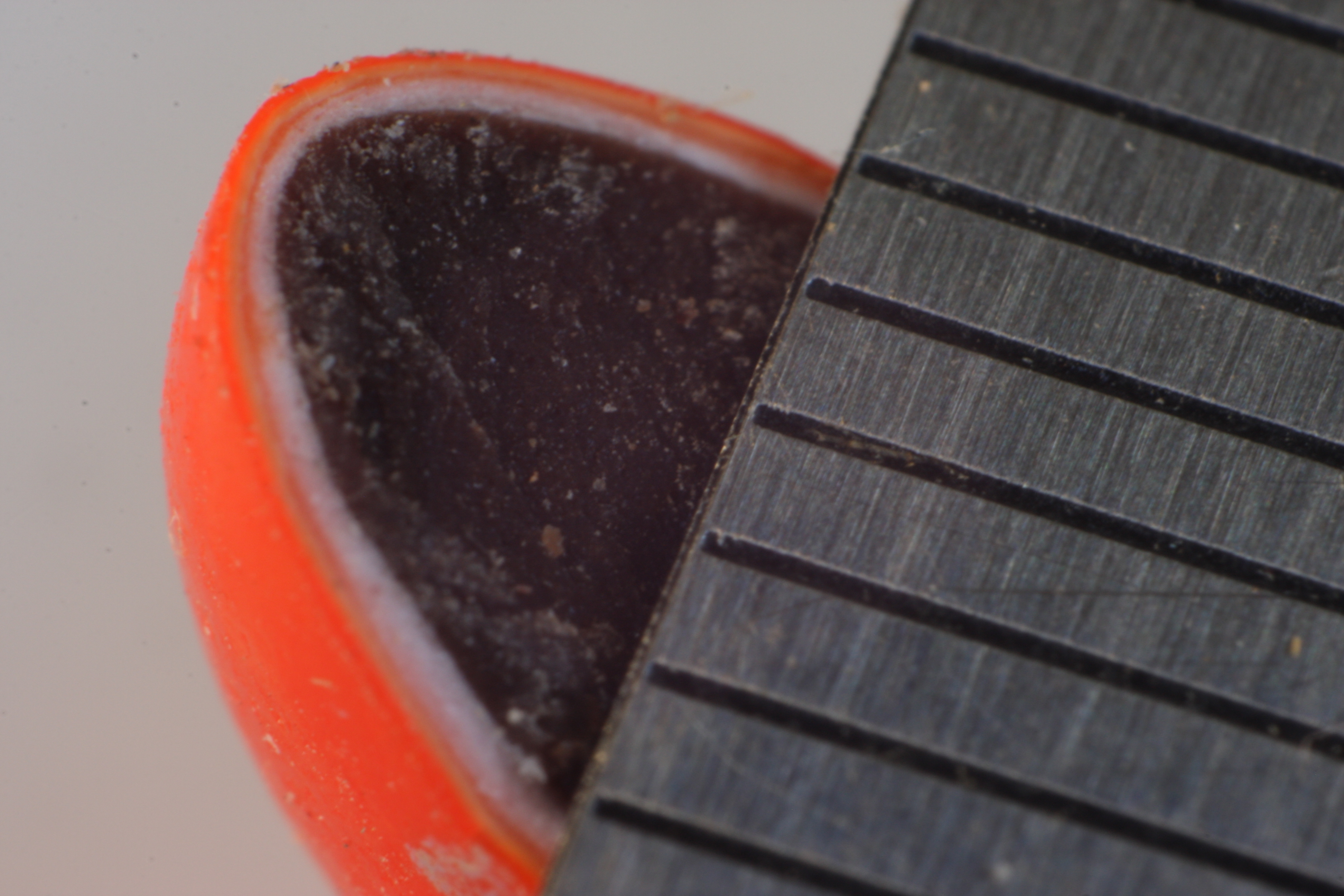
A cross-section of an orange M&M confection with millimeter ruler for scale shows its layers of hard-panned coating

The company's first big customer was the U.S. Army, which saw the invention as a way to allow soldiers to carry chocolate in tropical climates without it melting. During World War II, the candies were exclusively sold to the military. The resulting demand caused an increase in production and the company moved its factory to bigger quarters at 200 North Twelfth Street in Newark, New Jersey. In 1958, the company moved to a bigger factory at Hackettstown. A second factory was opened in Cleveland, Tennessee, in 1978. Today, about half of the production of the confection occurs at the New Jersey factory, and half at the Tennessee factory.

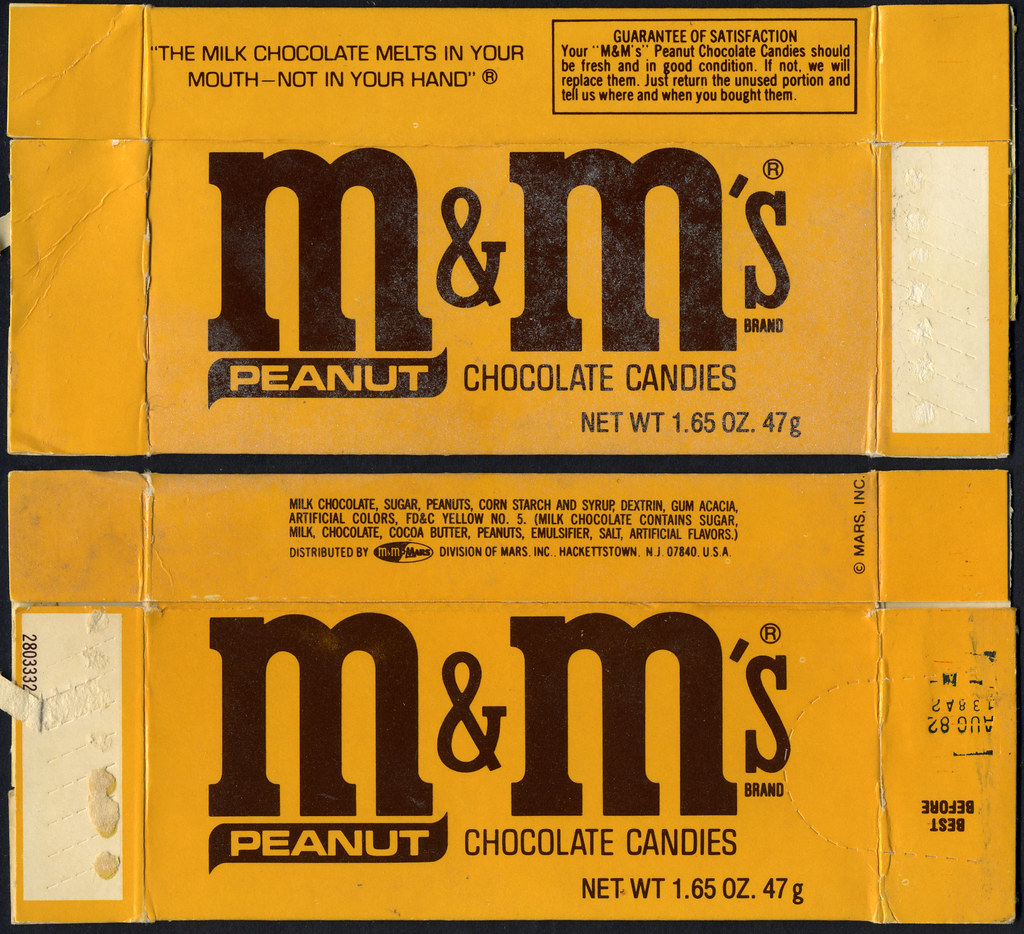
A peanut variety was introduced in 1954

In 1949, the brand introduced the tagline "the milk chocolate that melts in your mouth, not in your hand". In 1950, a black "M" was imprinted on the candies giving them a unique trademark. It was changed to white in 1954. In the early 1950s, the Midwest Research Institute, now MRIGlobal, in Kansas City, Missouri, worked on behalf of the confection company to perfect a process whereby 3,300 pounds (1,500 kg) of chocolate centers could be coated every hour.

A peanut variety was introduced in 1954 and appeared only in the color tan. In 1960, the company added the yellow, red, and green colors.

In the 1960s, an almond-centered variety was marketed and then withdrawn until a later reintroduction twenty years later.

In 1976, the color orange was added to the mix to replace red, which was discontinued in response to the "red dye scare" over Red Dyes #2 and #4 having been evaluated as carcinogenic. Although the M&M's confections were made with the less controversial Red Dye #40, the public was wary of any food being dyed red. The red variety was reintroduced in 1987.

=== 1980s: Expanding internationally ===
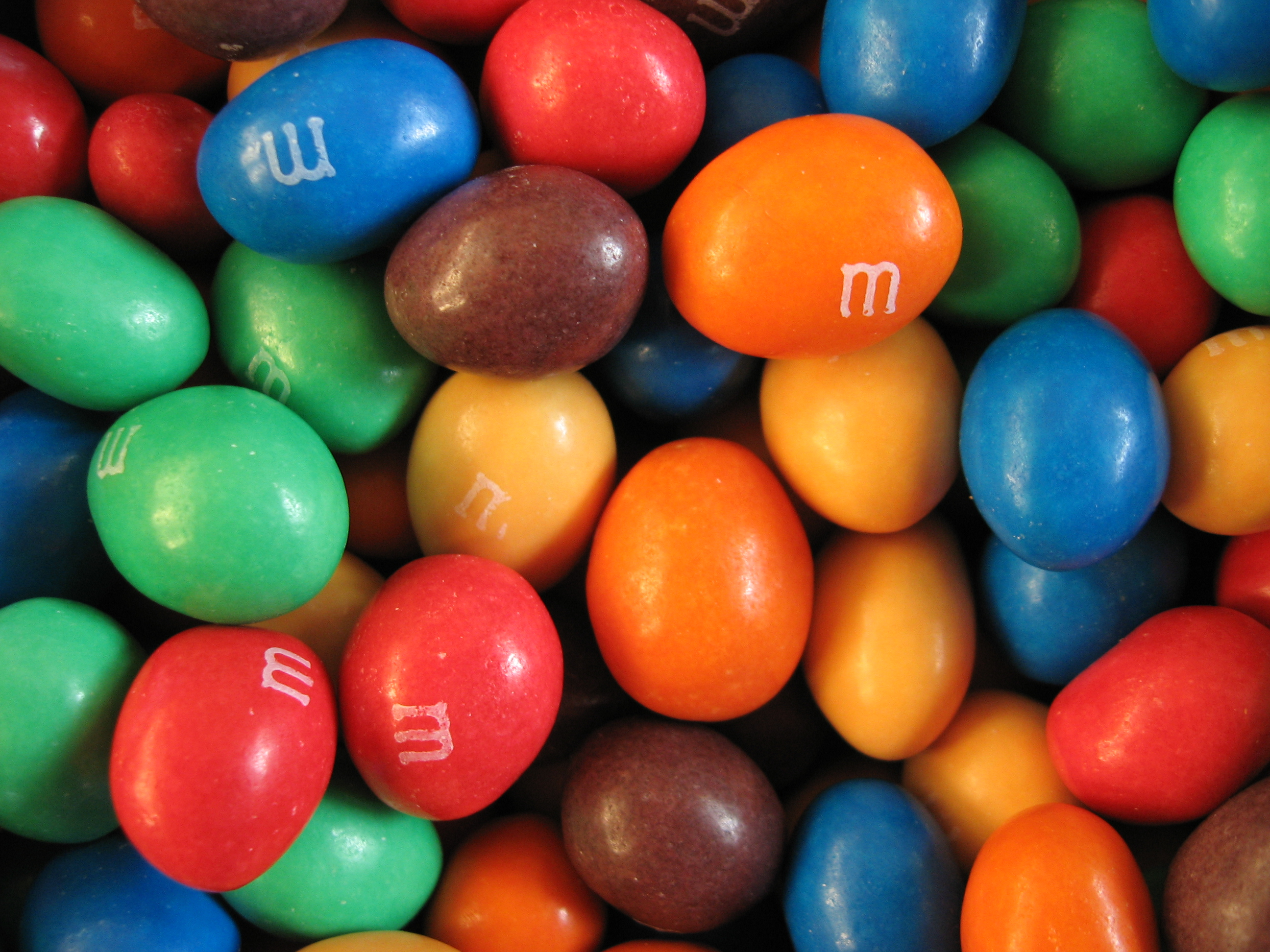
Peanut M&Ms have a different shape

In the 1980s, the confections were introduced internationally to Australia, Canada, Europe, Hong Kong, Japan, Malaysia, and the United Kingdom. M&Ms Royals were marketed in the early 1980s with an advertising campaign that said: "Now chocolate's got a whisper of mint." They were colored pale green or brown and showed a crown rather than an M&Ms logo.

Holidays Chocolate Candies for Easter and Christmas were launched in 1986, with the Easter confection having a bunny, chick, and egg symbols on pastel-colored shells and the Christmas confection having pine tree, bell, and candle symbols on red and green shells. The green shells had a special mint flavor. By 1993, the holiday symbols were replaced with the standard trademark "M".

In 1988, the almond-centered variety once offered in the 1960s became available again in limited release, with appearances only during Christmas and Easter times. They became a standard part of the product line in 1992.

=== 1990s: New flavors ring ===
In 1991, the Peanut Butter variety was released. These candies have peanut butter inside the chocolate shell and the same color scheme as the other varieties of the confection. As of at least 2013, the size of the peanut butter M&M has become slightly smaller. In 1995, tan M&Ms were discontinued and replaced by blue. To introduce the new color, the Home Shopping Network televised a promotional video for the blue M&M. Producer Jon Watson became the first man to wear the famous blue M&M suit.

During the 1990s, Europe first began to adopt the M&M's brand name, replacing existing products. Two of these products were known as "Treets" and "Bonitos". In 1996, Mars introduced "M&M's Minis", smaller confections usually sold in plastic tubes instead of bags. In 1999, Crispy M&Ms were released. They were slightly larger than the milk chocolate variety and also featured a crispy wafer center. The Crispy variety was discontinued in the United States in 2005, before being reintroduced in 2015 and re-discontinued in 2022 to make way for the Crunchy Cookie flavor. They remained available in Europe and Australia.

=== 2000s–present: New flavors and re-releases ===
In July 2001, the dulce de leche variety was introduced in five markets with large Hispanic populations: Los Angeles, California; San Diego, California; Miami, Florida; McAllen-Brownsville, Texas; and San Antonio, Texas. The product never became popular with the Hispanic community, who preferred existing varieties, and the variety was discontinued in most areas by early 2003.

Several other varieties of M&M debuted throughout the 2010s. These include a Pretzel variety released in 2010, a limited edition Coffee Nut variety released in 2016, another Caramel variety released in 2017, a limited edition English Toffee variety released in 2019, and a limited edition Hazelnut Spread variety also released in 2019.

A range of additional products was launched in the 2000s and 2010s to expand beyond the traditional line of candies. A chocolate bar called the M-Azing was initially released in 2004, and relaunched in 2013, Oversized confections entitled the "Mega" variety were briefly released in 2007 to promote the Shrek film series, before being introduced as a standalone product in 2014. M&M cookies began to be sold in the United States in 2016. M&M chocolate blocks were released in Australia in 2017.

In 2020, a Fudge Brownie variety was released in the United States. They were discontinued in April 2024.

In September 2022, the introduction of a purple variety was announced, as well as their newest "spokescandy", Purple.

Mars, Inc. announced the introduction of a new variation of its iconic M&M's candies produced entirely without artificial dyes, starting in August 2026. The product rollout was timed alongside the brand's 85th anniversary.

== Ingredients ==
A traditional milk chocolate M&M weighs approximately 0.91 grams / 0.032 ounces. It has approximately 4.7 calories (kcal) of food energy (1.7 kcal from fat). Contrary to a misconception held by some, each colored M&M does not have a different flavor. All possess the same chocolate taste.

== Marketing ==
Over the years, marketing has helped build and expand the M&M's brand. Computer-animated graphics, personification of the confections as characters with cartoon-like storytelling, and various merchandising techniques including the introduction of new flavors, colors, and customizable merchandise have helped to increase the brand's recognition as a candy icon.

In 1982, the Mars candy bar company rejected the inclusion of the confection in the new Steven Spielberg film E.T. the Extra-Terrestrial. However, competitor Hershey took a chance with their Reese's Pieces that are similar, but contain a peanut butter filling. With the film's blockbuster success, Reese's Pieces sales dramatically increased, perhaps by as much as 300%.

=== Marketing campaigns ===
Between 1982 and 1987, the company slogan was "All the World Loves M&M's", accompanied by a television jingle of the same name. Actor Joel Higgins, then co-starring in the NBC-TV sitcom Silver Spoons, co-wrote the song.

In 1990 at New York's Erie County Fair, the company exhibited a life-size fiberglass cow covered with 66,000 M&M candies—each adhered by hand with the "m" logo on each candy facing outward. According to a website run by the cow's designer, Michael Adams, the stunt earned M&M Mars $1 million in free publicity because it was reported on by Newsweek magazine, as well as the New York Post, UPI, WABC-TV, and Live with Regis.

In 1995, the company ran M&M's Color Campaign, a contest in which participants were given the choice of selecting purple, blue, or pink as the color of a new variety of the confection. The announcement of the winning color (blue) was carried on most of the network television news programs, as well as the talk shows of David Letterman and Jay Leno. As part of the contest results, the company had the Empire State Building lit up in blue. Although the financial details of these deals were not disclosed and neither was the effect of the campaign on sales, one marketing book estimated that the company "collected millions" in free publicity and that the campaign "certainly" resulted in an increasing of brand awareness.

In 1996, Mars produced Christmas-themed advertisement for the confections in which the Red and Yellow characters run into Santa Claus on Christmas Eve. Similarly to competitor Hershey's own Christmas-themed commercial. The commercial proved immensely successful and has re-aired every December since, becoming their longest-running television commercial.

Since MM is the Roman numeral for 2000, the confections were styled as "The Official Candy of the New Millennium" in 1998. This date was also the release of the rainbow variety that are multi-colored and filled with an assortment of different fillings.

In 2000, the "Plain" variety, a name created in 1954 when "Peanut" variety was introduced, was renamed "Milk Chocolate". Images of the colorful confections were added to the traditional brown and white packaging.

In 2004, the company adopted the 1967 Petula Clark song "Colour My World" for its television ads, albeit using newly recorded versions with other singers.

=== Joint marketing campaigns ===
In 1990, Mars Snackfood US signed up to be a sponsor for NASCAR in the NASCAR Cup Series. Through the years, drivers for their sponsored car have included: Ernie Irvan (1999), Ken Schrader (2000–02), Elliott Sadler (2003–06), Ricky Rudd (2007), David Gilliland (2006–07), Michael McDowell, Matt Crafton, Erik Jones, David Ragan, and Kyle Busch, 2008–2022, who won the 2015 Sprint Cup Series Championship & 2019 Monster Energy Cup Series Championship.

2022 was the final year for Mars as Busch's sponsor. Mars also sponsored Busch in the Xfinity Series and Craftsman Truck Series along with Busch's team, Kyle Busch Motorsports. Mars sponsored the 2022 NASCAR Cup Race at Pocono, entitled the "M&M's Fan Appreciation 400". Five years later, in 2026, M&M's returned to NASCAR to sponsor Ty Gibbs' throwback to Busch's No. 18 car as a remembrance to Busch.

The introduction of the blue M&M to Australia was promoted by the Australian Football League's Carlton Football Club that wore sky-blue colored guernseys in one of its matches in 1997 instead of its traditional navy blue, a color the successful and fiercely traditional club had worn since the 1870s. In 2010, Mars Snackfood Australia described it as the most successful promotional campaign it had ever engaged in.

In April 2005, the company ran the "mPire" promotion to tie in with the Star Wars: Episode III – Revenge of the Sith film release. M&M's were offered in dark chocolate varieties (regular and Peanut) for the first time after a string of Addams Family commercials for the confection.

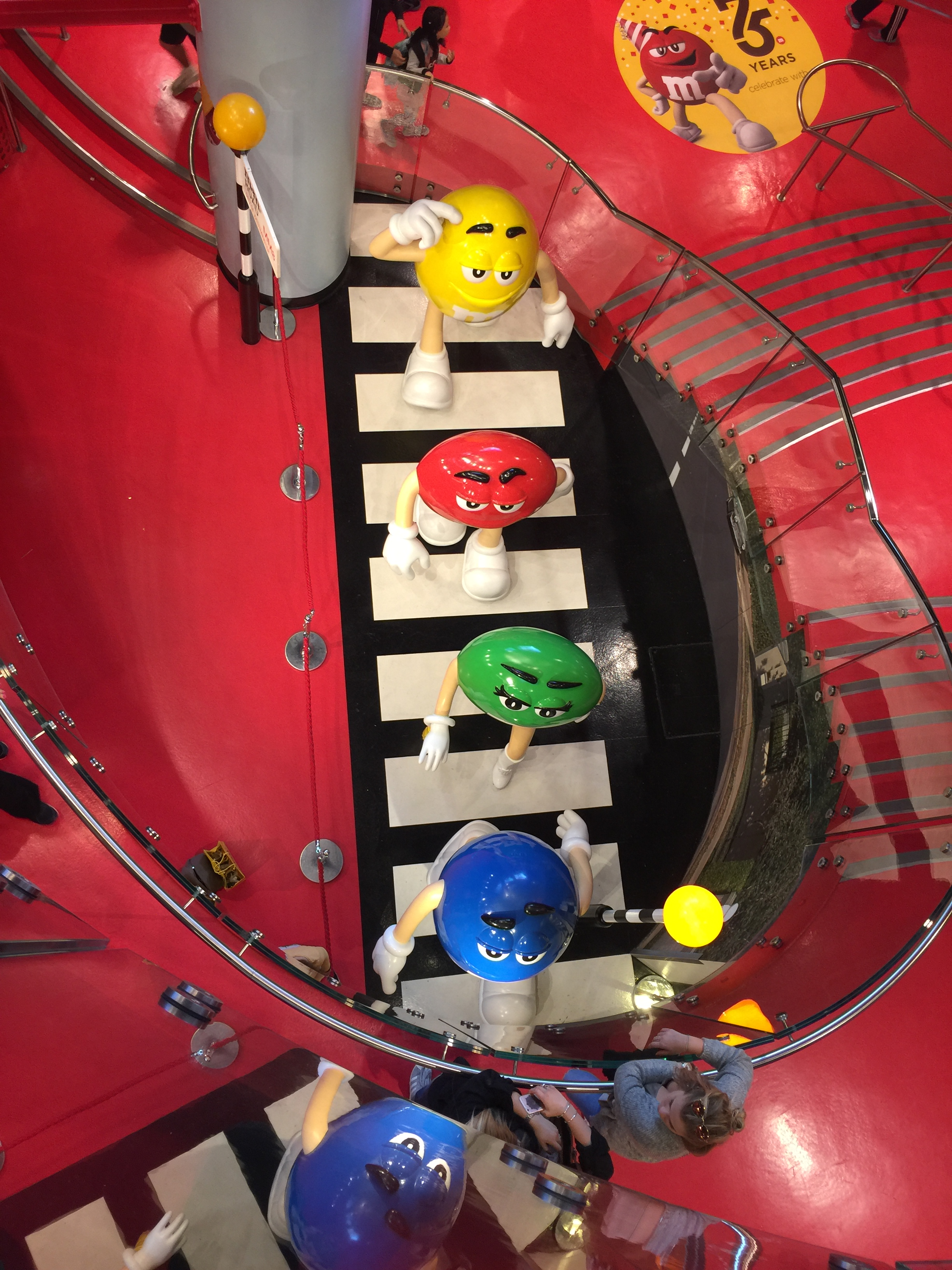
M&M's World London

In May 2004, the Mars company ran a Shrek 2 promotion to tie in the confection with the release of the film. The confections were offered as "ogre-sized" (65% larger) and in swamp-ogre colors. They were sold at many stores displayed in huge cardboard-cutout ogre displays. In the summer of 2005, Mars added "Mega" to the product lineup. These confections, at 55% larger than the traditional size, were a little smaller than the ogre-sized version. They were available in milk chocolate and peanut varieties. The colors of the sugarcoating were changed to less-bright colors, ostensibly to appeal to older consumers, namely, teal (replacing green), beige (replacing orange), maroon (replacing red), gold (replacing yellow), blue-gray (replacing blue), and brown.

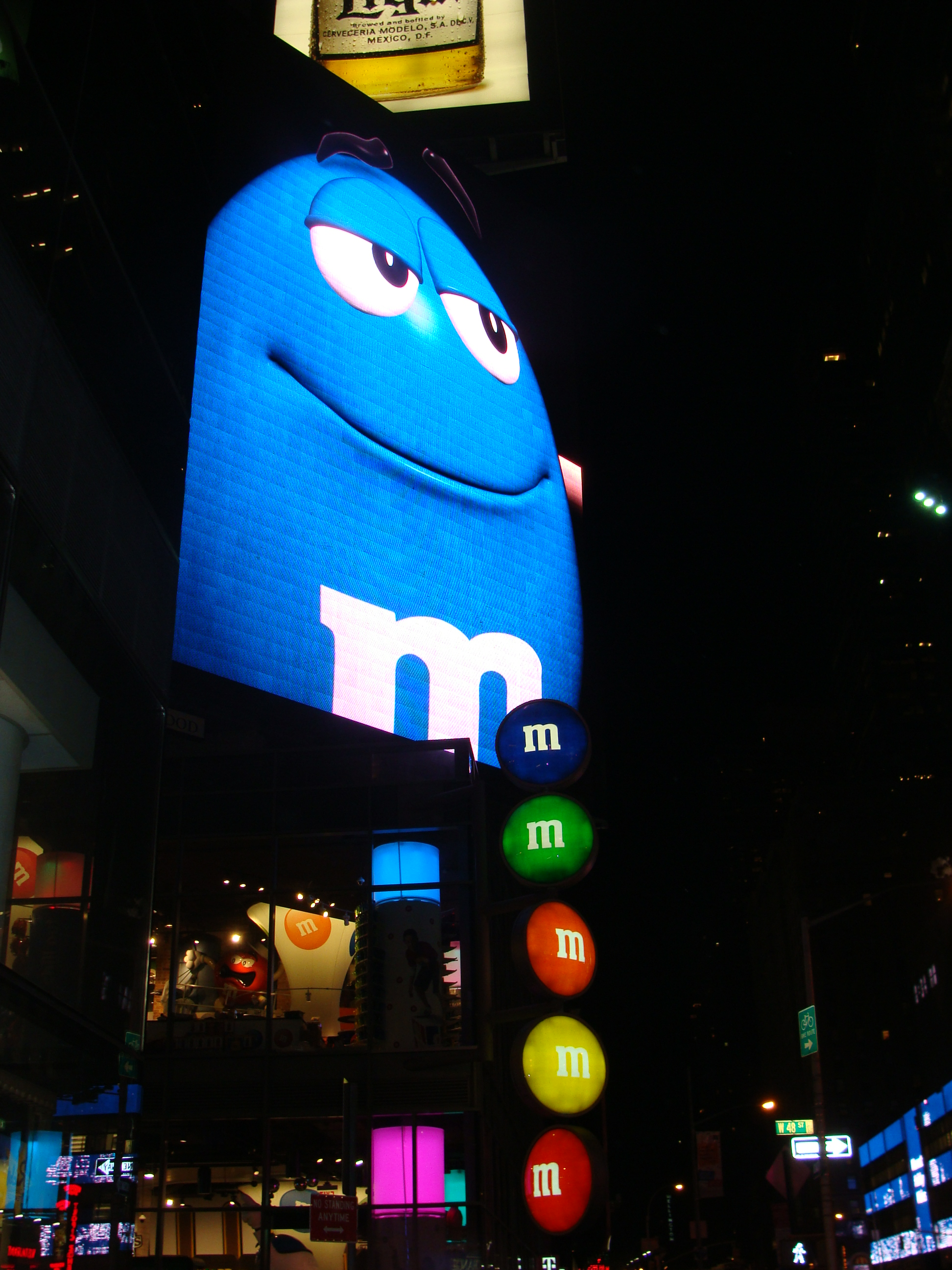
Outside of M&M's World in Times Square, New York City

In July 2006, a dark chocolate variety reappeared in a purple package, followed in 2007 by a dark chocolate peanut variety. Also in 2006, the company piloted a white chocolate variety as a tie-in with their Pirates of the Caribbean promotion. The company also offered eight new flavors of the confection via online sales, as well as at M&M's World locations: "All That Razz"; "Eat, Drink, & Be Cherry"; "A Day at the Peach"; "Orange-U-Glad"; "Mint Condition"; "AlmonDeeLicious"; "Nut What You Think"; and "Cookie Monster". Mars also released a "Crispy Mint" variety in Australia that year.

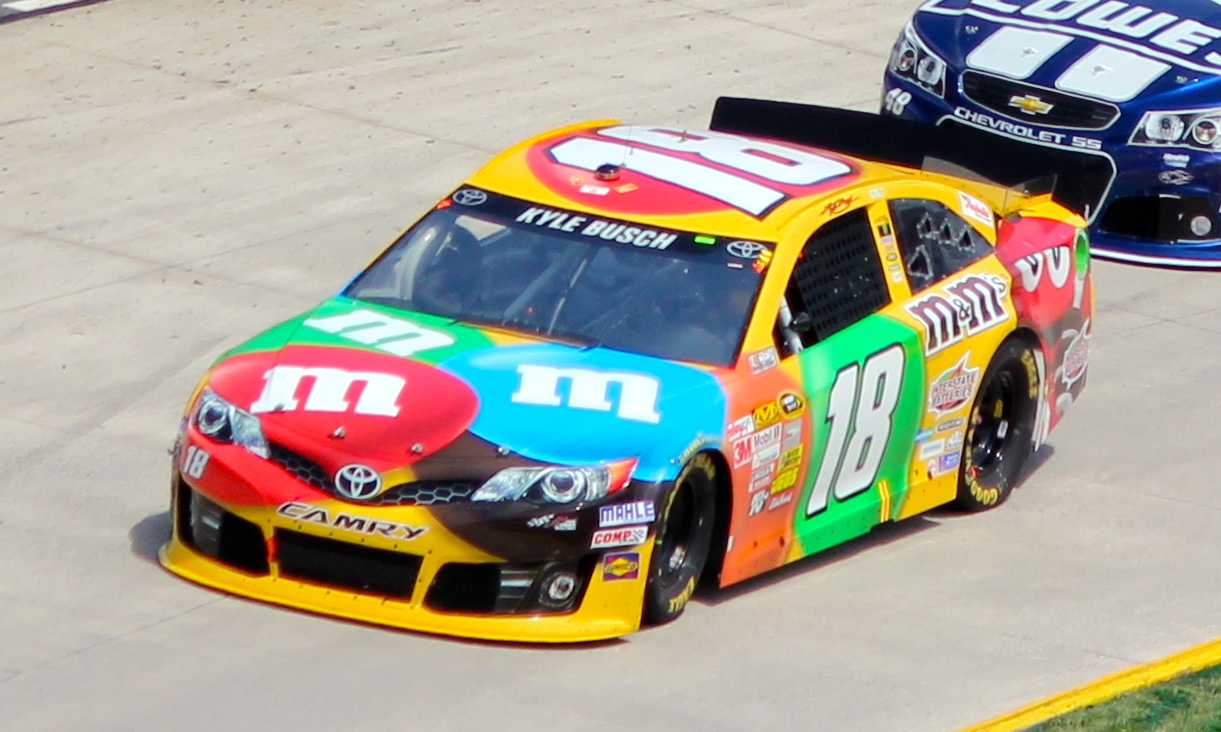
The sponsored NASCAR stock car driven by Kyle Busch

The M&M confections became the official chocolate of NASCAR in 2006.

In 2007, the company introduced a limited-edition raspberry flavor called "M&M's Razzberry Chocolate Candies".

Also in 2007, the company produced a 50-feet tall, smiling Lady Liberty M&M statue to kick off a campaign encouraging Americans to create their own M&M characters at mms.com. The website allows for people to log in, in order to create their own character from scratch, choosing features such as the color, shape, hair, and accessories.

In 2008, two limited-edition varieties of the confection were introduced, "Wildly Cherry" and, as a marketing tie-in with the film Indiana Jones and the Kingdom of the Crystal Skull, "Mint Crisp".

They also introduced another new product entitled "M&M's Premiums" in 2008. They were introduced in five flavors: chocolate almond, mint chocolate, mocha, raspberry almond, and triple chocolate (milk, dark, and white chocolate) that are sold in small upright cartons with a plastic bag inside. They do not have a candy shell, but are coated with carnauba wax and color. Dark chocolate was added in 2009, replacing mocha.

During the summer of 2008, the company launched "Faces", which allows consumers to print the faces of loved ones on chocolate candies via My M&M's at mymms.com.

In February 2009, the company launched the "M&M's Colour Break-Up" promotion in Australia, where the confections were sold in separate packs (one for each color): the packs included a code to win prizes.

In summer 2009, they launched a limited-edition "Strawberried Peanut Butter" variety to tie in with the release of Transformers: Revenge of the Fallen. At the same time, they launched another limited-edition "Coconut" variety that became a permanent item in 2010.

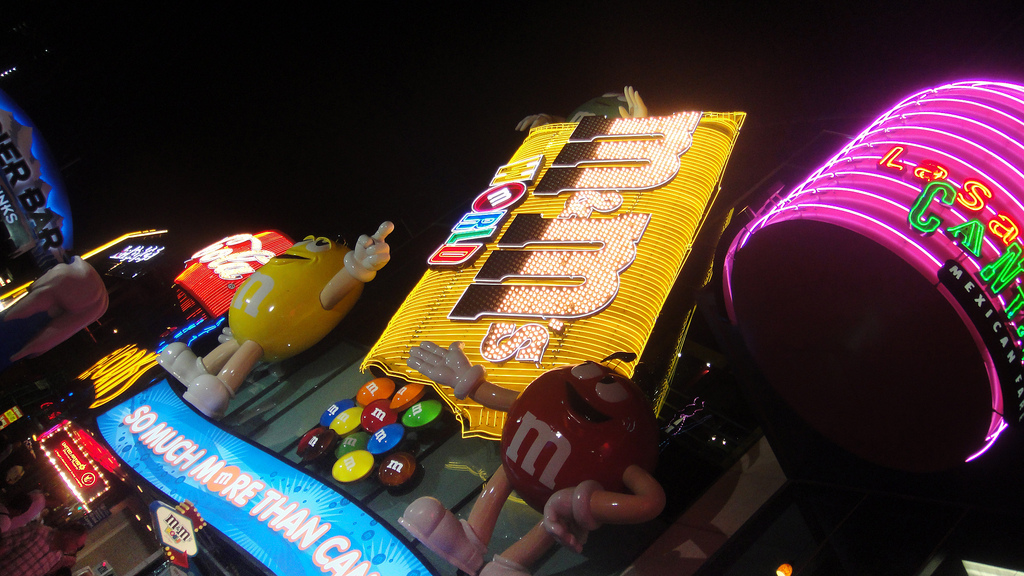
M&M's World on the Las Vegas Strip

In early 2010, M&M's "Bare All" were released as part of a competition in Australia and New Zealand. The packages contained ordinary M&Ms, but without colored shells. The Bare All confections won the competition and an official website was launched, along with television advertisements. In April 2010, M&M's launched a new Pretzel variety. In November 2011, Mars released a limited variety for Christmas, M&M's Cinnamon Milk Chocolate.

About the time the pretzel variety came out, the wrapper designs in the United States were redone from the design used from 2004 to early 2010.

In 2012, two new dark chocolate flavors were released, Raspberry and Mint. Also that year, a white chocolate flavor was released for the Easter season. Onward from May 30, 2012, launching from Macau was planned. In 2012, the peanut variety was produced in the UK in a limited-edition "Red, White, and Blues only" package, in connection with the country's Diamond Jubilee and 2012 Summer Olympics. The "M" remains white on the white candies.

The commercial advertising for this promotional campaign had Yellow donning outfits of British stereotypes to try to get into the limited-edition package. To promote the 2014 FIFA World Cup in the UK, the peanut variety was produced in a package that contained only green, yellow, and blue confections, to reflect the colors of the flag of Brazil. These were dubbed as limited-edition "Brazilian M&Ms" in the accompanying commercial. "Brazilian M&Ms" were re-released in 2016 to promote the 2016 Summer Olympics, but were available in both Chocolate and Peanut.

In 2013, the company launched the "Better with M" campaign that included cause-related marketing. The campaign worked with Habitat for Humanity and encouraged fans to use a Facebook app to volunteer at the various sites where the homes were being built. The advertising campaign was one of the largest that Mars had ever executed. The 2013 "America Better With M" initiative sought to provide money directly to Habitat for Humanity through offering limited versions of the candy in red, white, and blue.

Since 1988, specially designed packages of red, white, and blue Presidential M&M's have been given as souvenirs to guests of presidents of the United States. One side of the box containing the candy features the presidential seal and the signature of the current president; the other side of the box includes an M&M character flying the American flag. A common misconception exists that every candy handed out at the White House is stamped with the presidential seal. However, some U.S. embassies around the world do give out M&Ms stamped individually with the seal of the United States.

M&M's World specialty shops have been established in some locations, including Las Vegas, Orlando, New York, London, and Shanghai.

Several M&Ms-themed video games have been created. The first was M&M's The Lost Formulas, released on September 28, 2000.

=== Related brands ===
Related confection brands from Mars include Minstrels, Revels, Skittles, and Treets.

== M&M characters ==
The seven cartoon "spokescandies" in marketing since 2022

Early black-and-white ads for the confection in 1954 featured two talking, anthropomorphic M&M characters—one plain and one peanut—diving into a swimming pool full of chocolate.

The first incarnation of the characters in CGI was a 1994 celebrity campaign that had the characters interacting with celebrities on which M&M candy color is their favorite. This campaign was created by Blue Sky Studios. Concurrent with the 1995 blue M&M campaign, the company introduced a second set of computer-animated "spokescandies" in their television commercials.

The depiction and campaign of the M&Ms were made by Will Vinton in 1995. Vinton previously created the clay-animated California Raisins in 1986. Around the time he worked on CGI projects, he made the depiction of the M&M characters as more mature than most food mascots. These include the team of the cynical and sardonic Red, originally voiced by Jon Lovitz, thereafter Billy West, the voice of the mascots for milk chocolate, peanut butter, and crispy.

The happy and gullible Yellow, originally voiced by John Goodman, thereafter J. K. Simmons, is the mascot for Peanut and originally was known as "Peanut" when that variety was first introduced. The "cool one", Blue, voiced by Robb Pruitt, is the mascot for Almond M&M's.

The seductive Green, voiced by Cree Summer in most regions, and by Larissa Murray in the UK, is the mascot for Dark Chocolate Mint and Peanut Butter. Her personality is a reference to the 1970s urban legend that green M&Ms were aphrodisiacs.

The slightly neurotic Orange, voiced by Eric Kirchberger, was introduced when the Crispy variety was first released and is the mascot Pretzel that debuted in 2010. As the mascot of Pretzel, Orange was joined by the second non-M&M mascot, Pretzel Guy, who "supports" the character and offers helpful advice, and who hates the idea of having a pretzel put inside his body.

Other mascots who were introduced, but no longer used, are Almond, the original green guy; Orange, a female peanut character; and Chocolate Bar, voiced by Phil Hartman, the first non-M&M character that always gets foiled or outdone by Red and Yellow by being melted, as M&Ms do not melt. Swarmees for the Minis candies, were portrayed as destructive yet crafty troublemakers whom Red and Yellow are always trying unsuccessfully to contain after they accidentally released them in the product's initial commercial.

Female M&M mascots were introduced in 1995. Green was the Milk Chocolate mascot and Tan was the Peanut. Marketing discontinued Tan when they introduced the then-new Blue mascot. Green was the only female M&M mascot from her introduction in 1995 until 2012 when the company unveiled a new additional "spokescandy", Ms. Brown, voiced by actress Vanessa Williams, the "Chief Chocolate Officer". During a Super Bowl LII advertisement, Red was transformed into a human after finding a lucky penny and wishing that he was inedible. As a human, he is portrayed by Danny DeVito.

In January 2022, Mars announced plans to alter the design of the M&M characters. The company announced that the aim of this change was to make their characters more representative of a broader array of human personalities and personal backgrounds. Among these changes is the adoption of more casual clothing for the Green and Brown, both of which are generally interpreted to be female characters. In September 2022, the company introduced a new Purple M&M voiced by Amber Ruffin, who first appeared in a commercial singing "I'm Just Gonna Be Me".

Referencing criticism surrounding the changes from conservative media outlets, the company teased a Super Bowl LVII commercial in January 2023 by making a fictitious announcement that the characters were being temporarily retired and replaced by comedian Maya Rudolph. In subsequent teasers leading up to the game, Rudolph was shown hijacking the M&M's brand in her own image, re-launching them as "Ma&Ya's" candy-coated clams. Concurrently, the company characters were depicted as "exploring their outside passions", collaborating with other brands such as Cheddar, eBay, Snickers, Spotify, and Zappos. During the eventual ad for Ma&Ya's, Red makes a cameo during its final scene alongside Yellow, holding up a sign reading "Help!" Following the game, the confection company then posted a "press conference" confirming the "spokescandies" had been reinstated.

Character	Type	Voice actor
Red	Milk Chocolate, Dark Chocolate, Peanut Butter, and Crispy	Jon Lovitz (1995–96); Billy West (1996–present); Bill Rogers (M&M's Kart Racing, M&M's Adventure, M&M's Beach Party)
Yellow	Peanut and Dark Chocolate Peanut	John Goodman (1995–96); J. K. Simmons (1996–present); Bill Rogers (M&M's Kart Racing, M&M's Adventure, M&M's Beach Party)
Blue	Almond, Raspberry, Dark Chocolate, and Hazelnut Spread	Robb Pruitt (1995-present); Bill Rogers (M&M's Kart Racing, M&M's Adventure, M&M's Beach Party)
Green	Dark Chocolate, Mint, and Peanut Butter	Cree Summer (1997-present) (US); Larissa Murray (UK)
Orange (Crispy)	Crispy and Pretzel	Eric Kirchberger (1995-present); Bill Rogers (M&M's Kart Racing, M&M's Adventure, M&M's Beach Party)
Ms. Brown	Dark Chocolate, Milk Chocolate, and Fudge Brownie	Vanessa Williams
Purple	Peanut, Caramel Cold Brew, and Hazelnut Spread	Amber Ruffin (2022-present)
Chocolate Bar (rectangular)	Milk Chocolate	Phil Hartman
Pretzel Guy (symmetrical)	Pretzel	Maurice LaMarche
Caramel (cube)	Caramel	David Cross

Below is a timeline of the official spokescandies from 1954 to the present day.

== Color changes ==
The original 1941 colors of M&M candies were red, yellow, violet, green, and brown. Violet was discontinued and replaced with tan in the late 1940s.

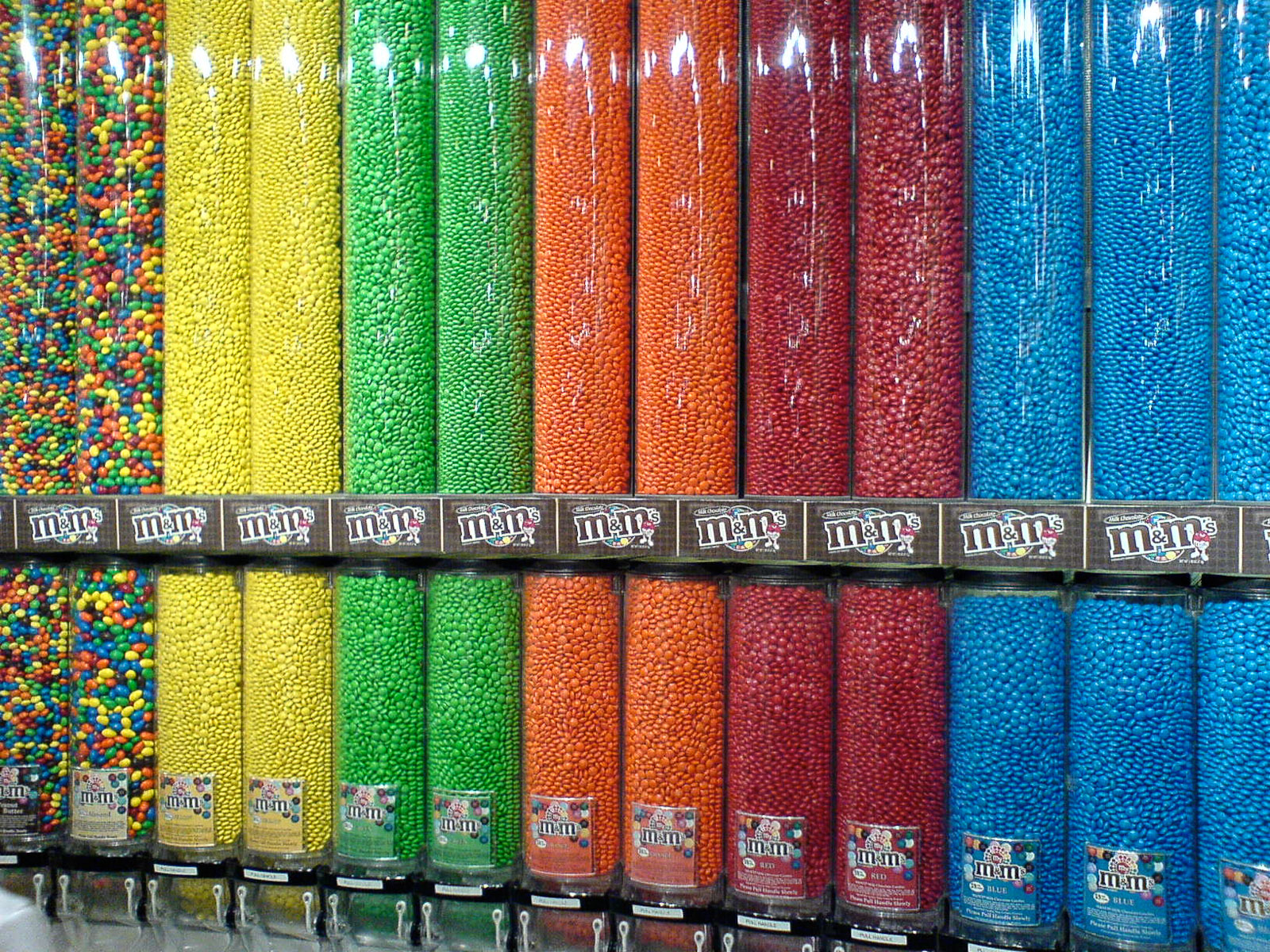
Transparent chutes hold M&Ms of various colors

In 1976, Mars eliminated red-colored M&Ms because of health concerns over the dye amaranth (FD&C Red #2) that was a suspected carcinogen and they introduced the orange variety. Despite the fact that M&Ms never had contained the dye, this action was taken by Mars purely to avoid any concerns by worried consumers. Ten years later, a student at University of Tennessee, Paul Hethmon, started a joke campaign to reinstate red M&Ms that would eventually become a worldwide phenomenon. The red M&Ms variety was reintroduced as a result and the orange variety that had replaced them were kept in production.

In Europe, the red M&Ms contains red dye carmine (E120, cochineal).

Tan was replaced with blue in late 1995, following a promotion in which consumers were invited to vote on which of blue, pink, or purple would replace the tan M&Ms. Blue was the winning color with 54% of the votes. Consumers could vote by calling 1-800-fun-color. Ads for the new blue colors featured a plain and an almond blue M&M character.

Red and Yellow were depicted as trying to do takes in the commercial by painting themselves blue where they appear on stage with B. B. King singing the blues, but the filmmakers had to cut the scene as they were not using the correct shade of blue proposed. Another version of the commercial featured Red and Yellow holding their breath to resemble the new blue M&Ms where Steven Weber sees the three M&M characters, Red, Yellow, and Blue. Another version featuring Weber asked the blue M&M whether or not it had dived into the chocolate pool.

In 2002, Mars solicited votes in their first ever "M&M's Global Color Vote" to add a new color from three choices: aqua (turquoise), pink, and purple. To help the colors get votes, Ken Schrader and his MB2 Motorsports team, who was sponsored by the company at the time, ran four paint schemes during the 2002 NASCAR Winston Cup Series season representing the promotion, one for aqua, one for pink, one for purple, and another one with all three colors on the car. Once purple won and was featured for a limited time, specially marked packages of the confection were released. Finding a bag of all purple M&Ms entitled American customers to a prize of 100 million Japanese yen (equivalent to approximately US$852,000), payable in U.S. dollars. Other cash prizes, numbering more than 50,000, came in euros, Australian dollars, Brazilian reais, Mexican pesos, and U.S. pennies.

Since 2004, M&Ms have been available online in 17 colors with personalized phrases on each candy on the opposite side from the "m". Released around Christmas, these custom-printed M&Ms were originally intended for holiday greetings, but are now available all year round.

For the 2008 Valentine's Day season, Mars introduced all-green bags of M&Ms. This was due to common urban folklore that says green ones are an aphrodisiac. The green ones were brought back for the 2009 season alongside the "Ms. Green Heats Up Valentine's Day" contest.

In October 2011, Mars released M&M's White Chocolate Candy Corn exclusively in the United States for Halloween. These candies come in three candy corn inspired colors: white, bright yellow, and bright orange.

The following is a summary of the changes to the colors of the flagship (milk chocolate) flavor, the only filling manufactured continuously since the beginning of the production of the confection. From 1941 until 1969, each package contained M&Ms in five different colors; when red M&Ms were reintroduced in 1987, they were added as a sixth color instead of replacing any of the existing colors.

== See also ==
- Cadbury
- Sixlets
- Freia's
- Hershey-ets
- Jelly Belly
- Skittles
