= M&M's Kart Racing =

2007 video game

- Wii version North American box art
- Developers: Frontline Studios; Calaris Studios
- Publishers: NA: Destination Software; UK: Zoo Digital Publishing
- Director: Jakub Goryszewski
- Producer: James Davis
- Programmer: Sebastian Zielinski
- Artist: Dominik Zielinski
- Composer: Lukasz Stasinski
- Platforms: Wii, Nintendo DS
- Release: Wii: AU: November 29, 2007; NA: December 5, 2007; EU: April 25, 2008; Nintendo DS: NA: March 24, 2008; EU: April 25, 2008
- Genre: Kart racing
- Modes: Single-player, multiplayer

M&M's Kart Racing is a 2007 kart racing game developed by Frontline Studios in co-production with Calaris Studios and published by Destination Software. Based on the M&M's license, it was released for the Wii in 2007 and for the Nintendo DS in 2008. The sixth entry in the M&M's video game series, it followed M&M's Break' Em, a 2007 puzzle video game for the Game Boy Advance and DS, and was succeeded by M&M's Adventure, a 2008 action-adventure game for the Wii and DS.

M&M's Kart Racing's gameplay revolves around playing single-player and multiplayer game modes in which each player controls one of five M&M's playable characters, racing go-karts on race tracks varying in shape and theme.

Both the Wii and DS versions of the game were widely panned by reviewers, who criticized its poor graphics, vehicle handling, and level design; the lack of items and music; and the underwhelming implementation of the M&M's license. Retrospectively, it is considered one of the worst racing games of all time.

== Gameplay ==
An example of gameplay from the Wii version of M&M's Kart Racing

M&M's Kart Racing is a kart racing game in which each player controls one of five sentient M&M's (Red, Yellow, Blue, Green, or Orange), who serve as the game's playable characters. The remaining characters are all controlled by artificial intelligence (AI). Although a player's character has no effect on their performance, the racing vehicles vary in speed, acceleration, handling, and braking.

All of M&M's Kart Racing's game modes are centered around at least one player racing across one or more race tracks based on unique environments, including a chocolate volcano, a chocolate factory, a forest, a farm, a sea carrier, a house, a city, the Arctic, an alien spacecraft, and a colosseum based on that of ancient Rome. The Wii version of the game features a total of 15 tracks. (Note: The back of the Wii version's box incorrectly states that there are 10 race tracks.) Players can collect chocolate coins scattered across each raceway; these coins can be used to unlock additional vehicles in the garage, such as a hovercraft and an SUV. Each player controls their vehicle with a Wii Remote, tilting to turn and pressing a button to accelerate. While on the starting line, a player can quickly spin their Wii Remote for a turbo boost that lasts between three and five seconds. Moreover, the B button can be used to drive in reverse after the player's vehicle has come to a complete stop.

One of the Wii version's single-player game modes, Quick Race, revolves around racing against computer-controlled opponents on a single track. Another single-player experience, Training Mode, allows the player to drive alone on any chosen track for practice. In Arcade Mode, the player must accumulate as many points as possible by collecting items and performing stunts, such as jumping or driving on two wheels. In Tournament Mode, the player competes against computer-controlled racers on all 15 tracks, with the player's finishing positions, performed stunts, and collected items all factoring into their score. Playing through Tournament Mode is required for unlocking certain advanced tracks. There are also two multiplayer game modes with split-screen gameplay: Quick Race, a one-lap race with only human players; and Full Throttle, a three-lap race with human and AI racers.

The Nintendo DS version of the game differs from the Wii version in multiple ways. One of the single-player modes is Tournament Mode, in which the player races on several tracks, being allowed to replay tracks as well as swap vehicles and characters between races. The other single-player mode is Time Trial, which tasks the player with racing as fast as possible while collecting time boosts, reaching certain areas before their timer expires, though their time is not actually recorded. Although single-cartridge multiplayer is not supported, up to five human players can race via local multiplayer, provided that they each have their own copy of the game.

Additional differences include the DS version featuring 11 race tracks instead of 15, the D-pad being used to steer the vehicles, and tracks being shrouded in mist to cover up the draw distance. The bottom screen displays a map of the track while the player is racing, and there are arrows on tracks that greatly but briefly boost the player's speed. Moreover, there are additional power-ups, including a homing missile that allows players to slow down racers in front of them, a barrel of oil for slowing down racers behind a player, a cup of hot chocolate that provides a brief speed boost, and a bag of M&M's that refills a fuel tank, which causes the player to slow down as it depletes. Additional collectibles include rainbow-colored M&M's that improve a player's score, as well as giant M&M's that appear in the Time Trial mode as checkpoints.

== Development and release ==
M&M's Kart Racing was developed by Frontline Studios in co-production with Calaris Studios. The game was published by Destination Software, which had previously published M&M's Break' Em, a 2007 puzzle video game for the Game Boy Advance and Nintendo DS. M&M's Kart Racing was also published by Zoo Digital Publishing in the United Kingdom. Jakub Goryszewski served as the game's director, while James Davis served as its producer. Additionally, Sebastian Zielinski programmed the game, Dominik Zielinski was its artist, and Lukasz Stasinski was its composer.

The Wii version of M&M's Kart Racing was released in Australia on November 29, 2007. The Wii version was subsequently released in North America on December 5, 2007, with the DS version being released in the same region on March 24, 2008. Both versions of the game were released in Europe on April 25, 2008.

== Reception ==
Reception

Aggregate score
Aggregator	Score
GameRankings	(Wii) 23% (DS) 22%

Review scores
Publication	Score
GameSpot	(DS) 2/10
GameZone	(Wii) 2/10
IGN	(Wii) 2.5/10 (DS) 3/10
Common Sense Media	1/5
Nintendojo	(DS) 1.7/10

M&M's Kart Racing was critically panned upon release. On the video game review aggregation website GameRankings, the game holds scores of 23% and 22% for the Wii and DS versions, respectively, with its average rating of 22.5% earning it Guinness World Records Gamer's Edition 2011's award for the lowest-rated kart game. Gameplay footage of M&M's Kart Racing was featured as Joystiq's "Today's most hilariously atrocious video" of November 17, 2007, with Scott Jon Siegel referring to it as "a true testament to the wrong way to build a kart racer". GameSpot named M&M's Kart Racing the "Flat-Out Worst Game" in its "Best of 2008" awards. Common Sense Media's Chad Sapieha wrote that the game "is little more than an advertisement for M&M's sweets".

Reviewing the Wii version of the game for IGN, Lucas M. Thomas deemed it a clone of Mario Kart and criticized the level design, noting a lack of items and shortcuts, with Louis Bedigian of GameZone adding that the levels were "awkward, overcrowded, and do not make much sense". Thomas and Bedigian singled out the interior areas as being difficult to navigate due to having narrow doorways. The reviewers also criticized the game's frame rate, especially in multiplayer modes. Thomas additionally found fault with the lack of a four-player mode, the long loading screens between races, and failure to incorporate "the playful personalities of the M&M's characters" into the gameplay. Bedigian also voiced displeasure with the game's camera, as well as its repetitive music and voice acting.

In a review of the DS version of M&M's Kart Racing for GameSpot, Justin Calvert wrote that the game "does almost nothing right" and "has practically no redeeming features whatsoever". Calvert negatively compared the game to Mario Kart DS (2005), noting fewer items and multiplayer options. Reviewing the DS version for IGN, Jack Devries similarly felt that there was "nothing redeeming about M&M's Kart Racing", concluding that it "looks, plays and sounds terrible" in addition to barely using the M&M's license. Devries considered the game to be "absurdly easy, which is nice because controlling the karts is a pain". Calvert and Devries agreed that the courses were "uninspired", with the latter stating that aside from the chocolate factory, they were irrelevant to M&M's. Both reviewers also criticized Tournament Mode, with Devries feeling that it lacked progression and Calvert stating that it lacked challenge due to allowing players to retry races as many times as needed. Devries added that the Time Trial mode did not serve any purpose due to not recording the player's time.

On the topic of the DS version's visuals, Devries stated that the characters were often obscured by their vehicles, while courses were enveloped in mist to cover up the "abysmally small" draw distance. Evan Campbell of Nintendojo condemned the "absolutely dismal presentation", citing "blurry textures, horrendous draw distances and a complete lack of creativity". Campbell further criticized the repetitive voice acting and soundtrack, writing that it "could quite possibly be the worst audio on Nintendo DS". GameSpot's Justin Calvert similarly panned the "grating, looping soundtrack" along with "sound effects that add nothing positive to the experience". Campbell and Devries each stated that the camera did not rotate to follow the player's kart during turns. Additionally, Calvert and Campbell both criticized the absence of a single-cartridge multiplayer option, with the latter noting that the DS's Download Play feature could have been utilized.

Retrospectively, M&M's Kart Racing is regarded as one of the worst racing games of all time. It was one of six titles included in GameZone's 2010 list of "The Most Abysmal Racing Games Ever" due to its low frame rate and repetitive dialogue. GamesRadar+ ranked M&M's Kart Racing 32nd in their 2017 list of "The 50 worst games of all time", criticizing the Wii version's motion controls, "awful" visuals, and lack of items. The same publication also included the game in its 2014 list of "The most forgettable kart racers ever released", citing its "relentlessly mundane" graphics, straightforward courses, and lack of items. TheGamer opined that the game "has the graphical quality of a cheaply made PlayStation 2 game, Nintendo Life added that it "doesn't make the most of the licence", and Screen Rant complained of "little to no variety in the gameplay options", though stated that it was not too difficult for younger players. Several publications noted that "Approaching sound barrier!" was an infamously overused line in the game.

== See also ==
- List of Wii games
- List of Nintendo DS games
- List of racing video games
- 2007 in video games
- 2008 in video games
