= M&M's World =

Chain of retail stores

Coordinates: 36.10261°N 115.17247°W

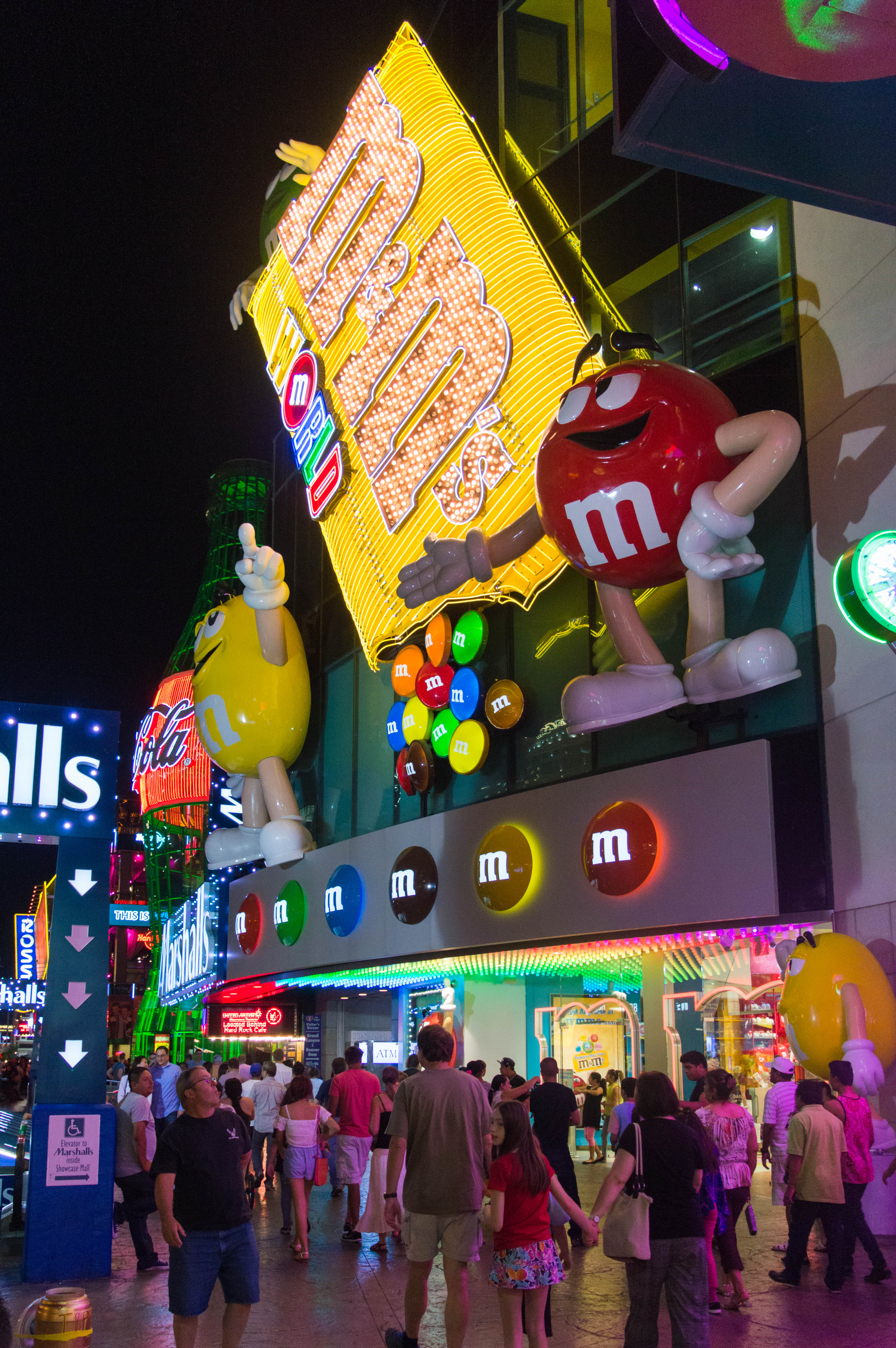
- M&M's World in Las Vegas.

General information
- Type: Retail store
- Location: Las Vegas; Orlando; New York City; London; Henderson; Shanghai; Bloomington; Berlin
- Opening: Las Vegas: October 18, 1997; Orlando, Disney Springs: January 30, 2021; New York City: December 7, 2006; London: 13 June 2011; Shanghai: 8 August 2014; Bloomington, Mall of America: May 1, 2021; Berlin: October 2, 2021
- Owner: Mars, Incorporated

Website
- www.mms.com/en-us/experience-mms/mms-world-stores

M&M's World (also M&M's or M&M's store) is a retail store that specializes in M&M's candy and merchandise. The first location was on the Las Vegas Strip in 1997, with others in Orlando, Florida, New York City, London, Henderson, Nevada, Shanghai and, Bloomington, Minnesota

== Locations ==
=== Las Vegas ===
The first location opened on the Las Vegas Strip in 1997, inside the Showcase Mall next to the MGM Grand. The four-story M&M's World includes a gift shop on the first floor. The shop leads to a 3D movie theater that shows the short subject I Lost My M In Vegas. Also on display are M&M's in nearly every color, and a NASCAR Cup Series show car with M&M's branding; the car was previously designed to resemble Kyle Busch's No. 18 M&M's car until Mars, Incorporated ended its sponsorship. M&M's clothing is sold on the second floor and on the stairs that go up to the second floor are pictures showing how the M&M's characters have evolved over the years painted on the wall.

The Las Vegas location received eight million visitors in 2007.

=== Orlando ===
Located in The Florida Mall, the 17,500-square-foot Orlando store was named "international store of the year" for 2005 by the Institute of Store Planners and VM+SD magazine (which covers store design and visual merchandising).

In late 2019, Mars Retail Group announced that they would be moving its Florida Mall location to Disney Springs, with an opening set for 2020. The Florida Mall location closed on August 21, 2020, with the opening of the Disney Springs location scheduled for the end of 2020.

The Disney Springs location officially opened on January 30, 2021.

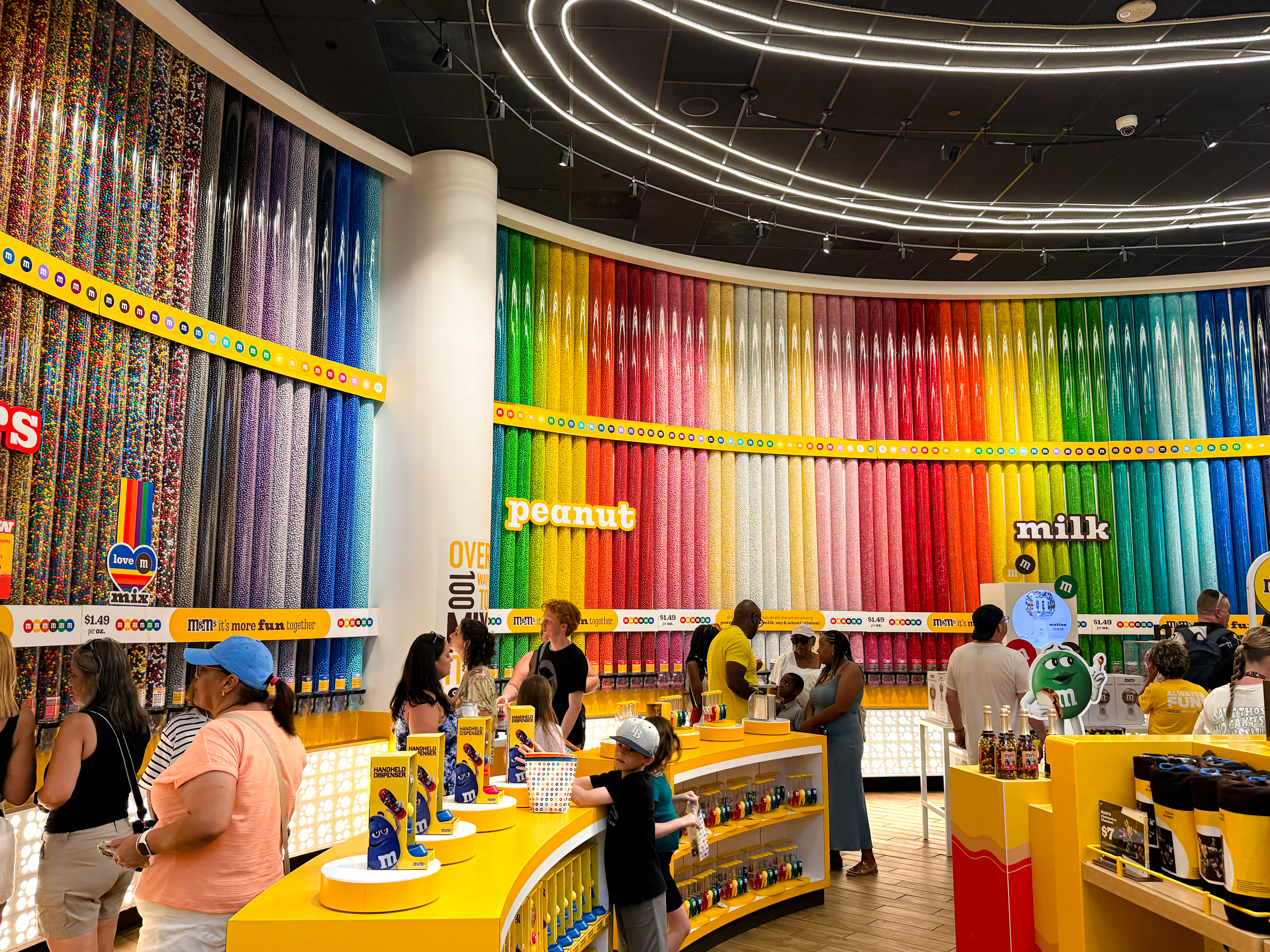
Inside the Disney Springs location

=== New York City ===
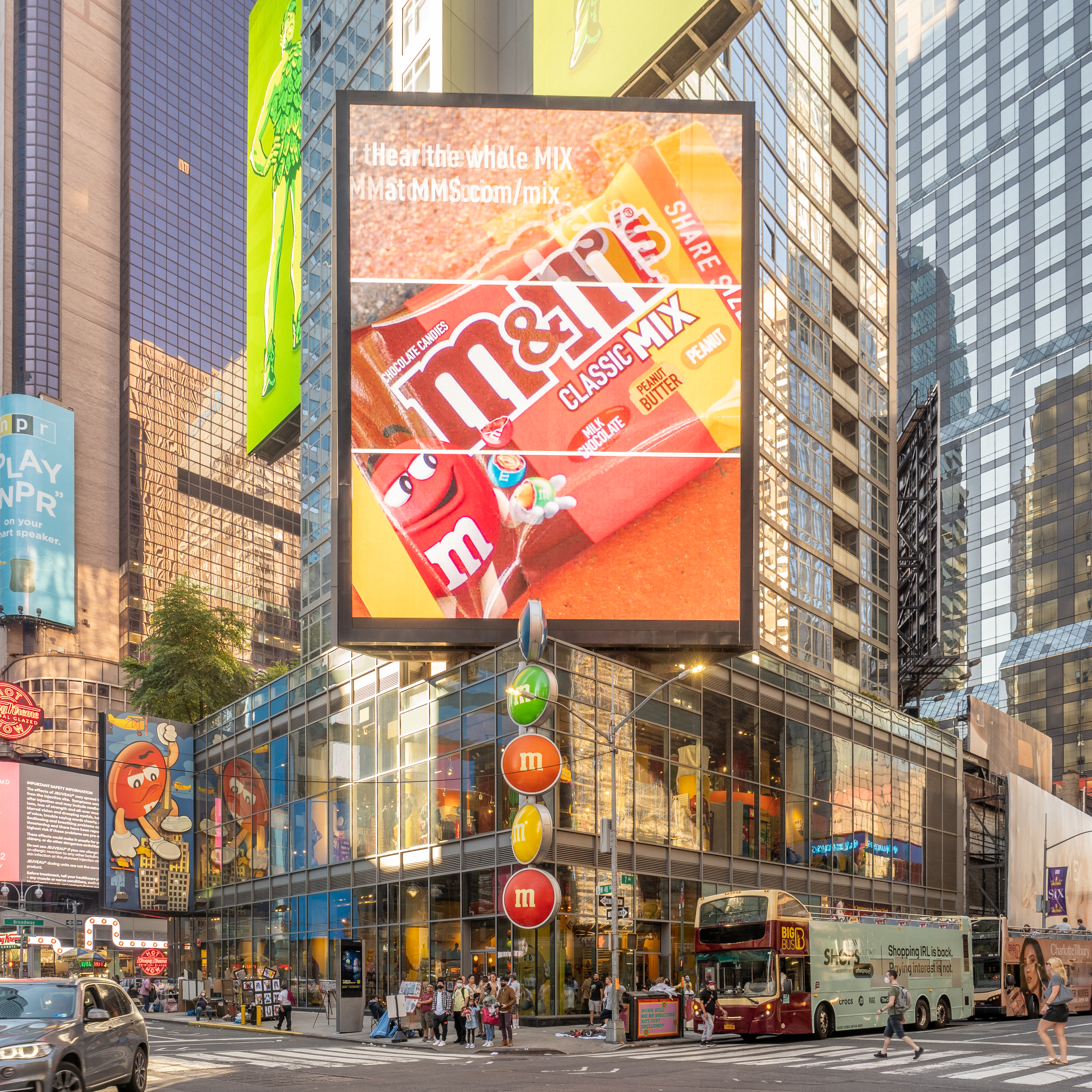
M&M's World in New York.

The New York City store is within a 24,000-square-foot (2,200 m^{2}), three-level glass box, in Times Square. It includes a 50-foot (15 m)-wide, two-story-high, "wall of chocolate", made up of 72 continuous candy-filled tubes.

=== London ===
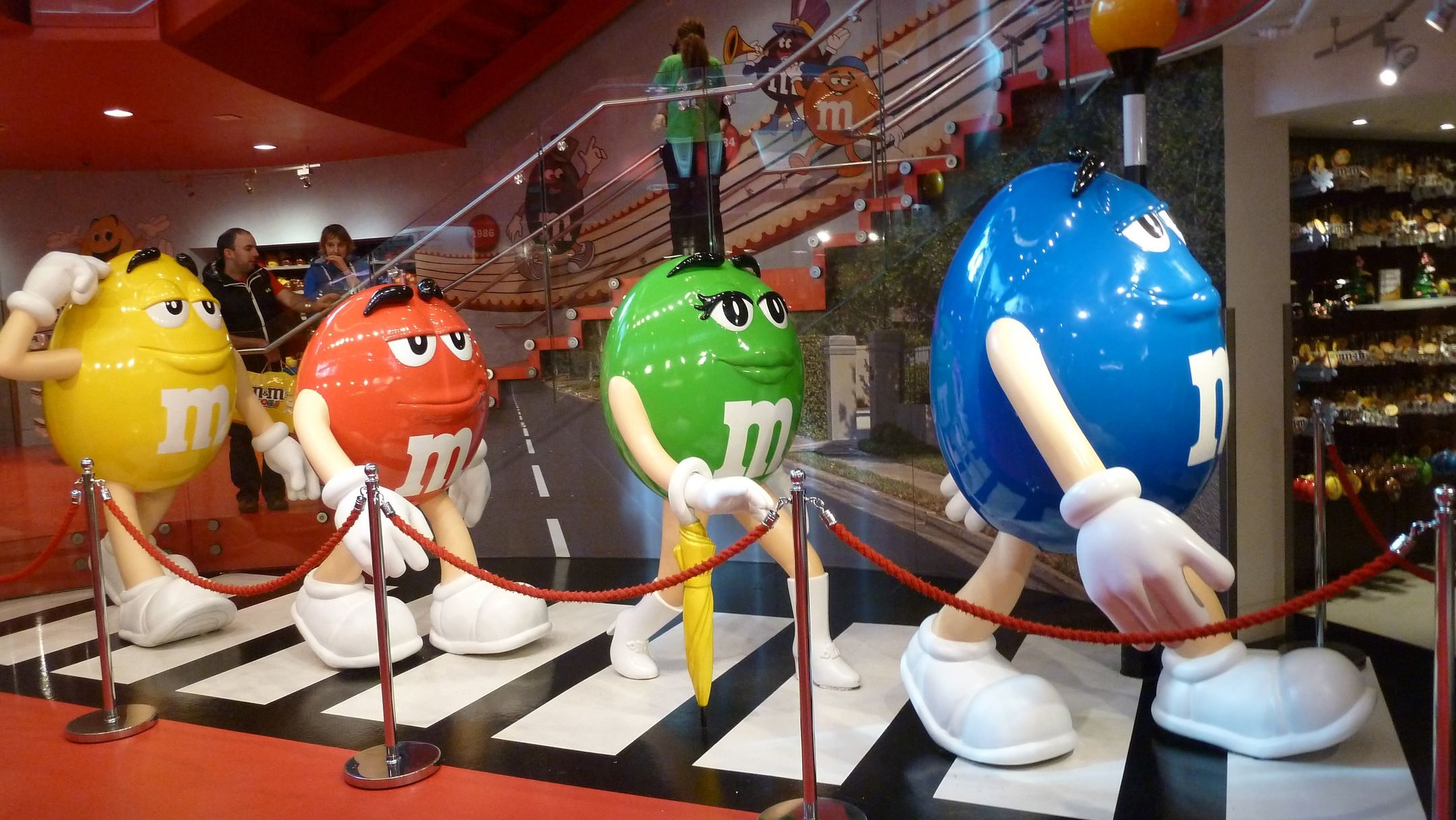
An M&M's statue in M&M's World London depicting The Beatles' famous Abbey Road album cover

On 13 June 2011, M&M's World shop in London opened to the public, in Leicester Square. The site was formerly occupied by the Swiss Centre.

It is the world's largest candy store, at 35,000 sq ft (3,250 sq metres). The retail space was built as part of Westminster City Council's regeneration of the local area, to create a "world class destination", based on the similar remodelling of Times Square New York.

=== Henderson ===
Mars Incorporated has a store close to its Ethel M Chocolate Factory in Henderson, Nevada. It is situated near to the plant's Ethel M Botanical Cactus Garden, which is one of the world's largest collections of its kind, and is based on the naturalistic English landscape garden model.

=== Shanghai ===
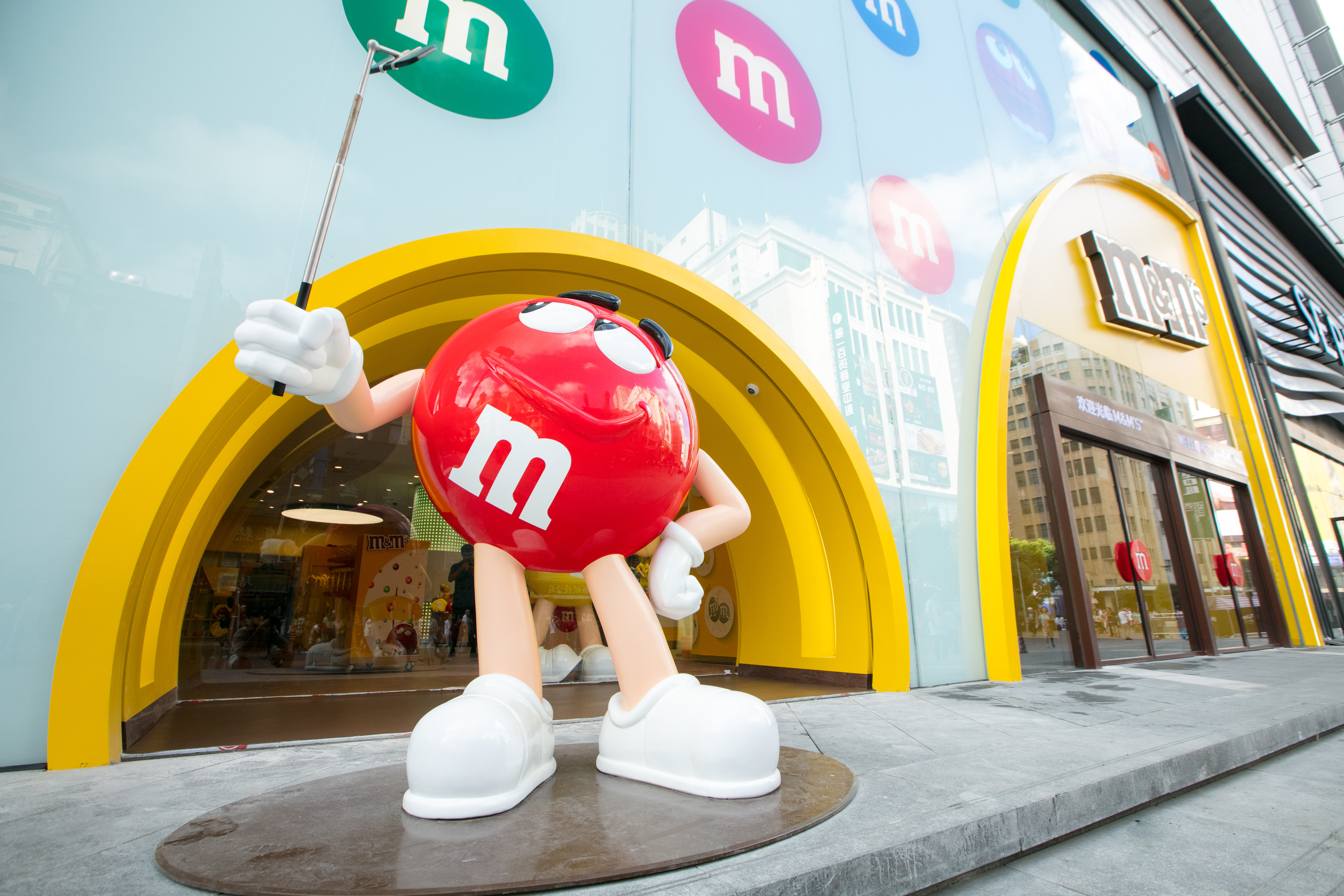
Entrance to M&M's World Shanghai.

First opened on August 8, 2014, it is the only branch of M&M's World in Asia. The 1,600-square-meter store is located in the busy Shanghai Shimao International Plaza. The store re-opened in December 2018 after a remodel.

=== Bloomington ===
In 2020, it was announced that Mall of America in Bloomington, Minnesota would be the first M&M's retail store to open in the Midwest, and fourth location in the United States with others in Las Vegas, Orlando and New York City. The store officially opened to the public on May 1, 2021.

=== Berlin ===
The M&M's Store in Berlin opened on the Kurfürstendamm on October 2, 2021.
