= List of M&M's video games =

This is a list of video games related to the M&M's brand.

== Overview ==
| Name | Date | Consoles |
|---|---|---|
| M&M's The Lost Formulas | 2000 | Macintosh, Microsoft Windows |
| M&M's Minis Madness | 2000 | Game Boy Color |
| M&M's Shell Shocked | 2001 (America), 2002 (Europe) | PlayStation |
| M&M's Blast! | 2001 | Game Boy Advance |
| M&M's Break' Em | 2007 | Game Boy Advance, Nintendo DS |
| M&M's Kart Racing | 2008 | Wii, Nintendo DS |
| M&M's Adventure (2008) | 2008 | Wii, Nintendo DS; Note: A PlayStation 2 version of the game was planned, but unreleased |
| M&M's Beach Party | 2009 | Wii |
| M&M's Adventure (2022) | 2021/2022 | Arcade, IOS, Android |

== M&M's The Lost Formulas ==
Cover art for M&M's The Lost Formulas

M&M's The Lost Formulas is a 3D platform game and the first M&M's-based video game. It was released on September 28, 2000, for both Macintosh and Microsoft Windows. It was published by Simon & Schuster Interactive in North America and JoWooD Productions in Europe and developed by Boston Animation. The gameplay is similar to that of the Crash Bandicoot series. It also features a "math mode" in which players are tasked with solving math problems. The math levels are for children ages 5–10.

=== Plot ===
Yellow and Red work at an M&M's factory and are about to go on a vacation, when Red finds out that Yellow left the M&M's Minis in charge of the factory while they were about to leave. Due to their incompetence, they have turned the factory into a mess and left robots running wild everywhere, and have also hidden many of the M&M's formulas. Before they leave on vacation, Yellow must head there and stop them. Throughout the game, Green, an M&M employee who also works at the factory, tests them on their progress.

=== Gameplay ===
Yellow is the only playable character. There are eight levels (with three zones on each level: the start zone, math zone, and end zone): "Get Out of Town", "Milk Chocolate", "Oh Chute!", "Candy Colors", "Stamping and Sortin'", "Pack It In", "Warehouse Woes", and "The Shocking Truth", plus four bonus levels. There is an additional bonus level at the end of both the start and end zones if all three pieces of the secret formula are collected (with Level 1: Get Out of Town and the end zone to Level 8: The Shocking Truth being the only exceptions). Levels one, the math zone of level five, and seven are played while riding a vehicle. Math zones are similarly themed to the start and end zones but require the player to solve a simple math problem. The answer is selected by either jumping to a numbered platform or driving through a numbered box. The difficulty of the problems slightly increases as the levels grow higher, but can also be set in the menu.

== M&M's Minis Madness ==
M&M's Minis Madness is a platform game released for the Game Boy Color in late 2000 for American markets. It is a platform game where the player controls four different M&M's characters who each have a specific ability that can be used to solve puzzles. The characters can be switched at any time by the player.

It was rated an overall 6.0 out of 10.0 by Nintendo Power. IGN rated it 4 out of 10, describing it as "barely competent" and too easy.

== M&M's Shell Shocked ==
M&M's Shell Shocked is an action platform game released for the PlayStation on September 28, 2001, for American markets by Simon & Schuster. The game is the PlayStation version of The Lost Formulas, but it is also similar in the vein of Crash Bandicoot. Players control Yellow in an effort to escape from their miniature counterparts (M&M minis); however, Red and Green also make an appearance. On July 20, 2002, the game was released in Europe by JoWooD. This game is a remake of M&M's The Lost Formulas, except there is not a Math Zone, the name was changed, power-ups were added, and the levels were either shortened or slightly altered. Due to hardware and CD-ROM limitations, the bonus level "Pipe Down" was removed. The bonus level "Robot Stampede" however uses the "Pipe Down" music (from M&M's The Lost Formulas). In order to make up for the Math Zones, boss zones were included as the final zone (known as "Zone C") of each level (replacing the Math Zones).

== M&M's Kart Racing ==
M&M's Kart Racing is a racing video game for the Nintendo DS and Wii, based on the M&M's license and developed by Frontline Studios in co-production with Calaris Studios. It is the fifth of the seven M&M's video games. The game allows you to play one of M&M's characters in 15 race environments.

M&M's Kart Racing was critically panned upon release. It has a GameRankings score of 22.50% and 22.33% for the Wii and DS versions, respectively.

IGN gave the DS version 3/10 and the Wii version 2.5/10, citing that "commercial mascots make terrible videogames" and that the game "barely uses the license at all". GameSpot gave the DS version 2/10, stating that the game "could put you off M&M's for life". GameSpot also awarded the game the "Flat-out Worst Game" award in GameSpot's "Best and Worst of 2008" awards. GameZone also panned it, giving it 2/10. The game was also awarded the lowest-rated kart game by Guinness World Records Gamer's Edition 2011, stating that the game's nearest "rival" was Shrek Swamp Kart Speedway, the latter of which has a GameRankings score of 26.40%, 3.9% more than M&M's Kart Racing.

== M&M's Adventure (2008) ==
M&M's Adventure is an action-adventure video game released on the Nintendo DS and Wii video game consoles by Zoo Games and developed by Nikitova Games. A PlayStation 2 version was planned but not released. The game takes place around Christmas. With Green, Yellow, and Red in the factory of M&MS when there is a system error, the harvested candies are ejected and all robots go AWOL, so the heroes will embark on the factory to stop the system error and save the factory.

The Factory works as a lobby, in which the player can access the different levels all based on different festivities, which are: Valentine's Day, Easter, the Fourth of July, Halloween, and Christmas being the final scenery and the central festivity in the story.

In the beginning, only Red is playable, but as the game progresses, one can play as Yellow, who has the power to double jump, and Green, who can attack with a racket. In the lobby, there are parts blocked by doors with the face of a character, which requires the use of that character (depending on the color and image of the door M&M only that M&M can enter). The game has one boss of the world, and the final is a snowman.

The two versions are almost exactly the same but with some differences such as the use of fog in the DS version to load the 3D terrain or the fact that the Wii version has different soundtracks depending on the area one is in. The game had bad reviews arguing that it is not worth buying from the critics but users consider it a decent game. In general, the Wii version was received better than the DS version due to the latter's worse graphic quality and featuring only two songs.

== M&M's Beach Party ==
M&M's Beach Party is a party game released on March 11, 2009, for the Nintendo Wii. In the game, The player defeats the other M&M's characters in six minigames: Kayak Race, Volleyball, Mr. Runch Slam, Skeeball Race, Ring Toss, and Colornator.
