= Gem Smashers =

2003 video game

- Developer: Frame Studios
- Publishers: Metro3D: Crave Entertainment (Wii, 3DS); Thumbstar Games (iOS); Funbox Media (PS4, Vita, NS, XBO); EU: Treva Entertainment (NS)
- Platforms: Game Boy Advance: Wii; Nintendo 3DS; PlayStation 4; PlayStation Vita; Nintendo Switch; Xbox One
- Release: July 1, 2003: Game Boy Advance; NA: July 1, 2003; JP: November 21, 2003; Nintendo 3DS, Wii; NA: November 8, 2011; iOS; WW: November 15, 2012; PlayStation 4, Vita; AU: February 24, 2017; NA/EU: March 3, 2017; Nintendo Switch; NA: March 15, 2018; EU: March 29, 2018; Xbox One; WW: November 2, 2018
- Genre: Puzzle
- Modes: Single-player, multiplayer

Gem Smashers (Note: Japanese: パズにん～うみにんのパズルでにむ～, Hepburn: Pazunin Uminin no Pazuru de Nimu) is a puzzle video game developed in Italy by Frame Studios and published by Metro3D for the Game Boy Advance. The game was released in North America on July 1, 2003, and in Japan on November 21, 2003.

== Development and release ==
The game was developed by three people. Gem Smashers was originally announced in 2002 under the working title "Bau Bam Bom", named after the three playable characters. The game was ported to Wii and Nintendo 3DS on November 8, 2011, on iOS on November 15, 2012, on PlayStation 4 and PlayStation Vita on March 3, 2017, on Nintendo Switch on March 15, 2018, and on Xbox One on November 2, 2018.

== Reception ==
The Game Boy Advance version of Gem Smashers received "mixed or average" reviews, according to the review aggregation website Metacritic. In Japan, four critics from Famitsu gave the game a total score of 19 out of 40. IGN wrote that the game was "one of the most original puzzle games on the GBA so far." Nintendo Life deemed the Nintendo 3DS version of the game "average".
