= Demon Gaze =

2013 video game

- Developers: Kadokawa Games; Experience Inc.
- Publishers: JP: Kadokawa Games; WW: NIS America; WW: Clouded Leopard Entertainment (Demon Gaze EXTRA)
- Director: Motoya Ataka
- Producer: Hajima Chikami
- Composer: Naoaki Jimbo
- Platforms: PlayStation Vita; Nintendo Switch; PlayStation 4; Microsoft Windows
- Release: PlayStation Vita: JP: January 24, 2013; NA: April 22, 2014; EU: April 25, 2014; Nintendo Switch, PS4: JP: September 2, 2021; WW: January 6, 2022; Microsoft Windows: WW: April 26, 2022
- Genres: Role-playing, dungeon crawler
- Mode: Single-player

Demon Gaze (Japanese: デモンゲイズ, Hepburn: Demon Geizu) is a dungeon crawl video game developed by Kadokawa Games and Experience Inc. for the PlayStation Vita. Released in Japan on January 24, 2013, it was published in North America and Europe by NIS America in April 2014. The game takes place thousands of years after the events of its predecessor, Students of the Round, which was created by the same developer.

In Demon Gaze, the player controls Oz, a young man that possess the power of a magic eye capable of sealing demons. The gameplay is split between venturing into dungeons and spending time at the inn where players can build relationships with non-player characters or spend the money they have earned in the dungeons. A manga adaptation for Demon Gaze illustrated by Kurono began serialisation in Dengeki Maoh in December 2013. An international version of the game was released in Japan as Demon Gaze: Global Edition on July 3, 2014. An enhanced version of the game titled Demon Gaze EXTRA was released in September 2021 for the Nintendo Switch and PlayStation 4 in Japan with a western release in January 2022. Upon the new changes HD graphics, the retry system, and the promise of future DLC that expands the post-game of Demon Gaze. The enhanced version was made available on Microsoft Windows via Steam in April 2022.

== Gameplay ==
The game takes place thousands of years after the events in Students of the Round. Players assume the role of the protagonist Oz, a mysterious young man with the power of a magic eye that grants him the ability to seal demons. The game allows players to create secondary characters that join him on his quest, with seven character classes and five different character races. There are 45 character illustrations altogether, which may be changed by "taking a bath". The demons in the game are part machine, and some of them can transform when they go on a rampage. After demons are defeated, the player is able to summon them to battle.

Oz journeys into the dungeons of Mislid to kill the demons and gather treasure before returning to town with his loot. Loot can then be used to pay rent at the local Dragon Princess inn or it can be spent to improve the player's party. Although battles take part in dungeons, the game's hub is set in a town where the player can rest and strengthen their party. While at the inn, players can rest or converse with the other non-player characters at the inn, including the manager Fran Pendor, who has a secret mission to offer the player. Certain conversations with non-player characters result in "heart pounding" cutscenes. Throughout the game, it is also possible to change the difficulty level, either in certain Dungeon Rooms or by talking with particular characters.

== Setting ==
Demon Gaze is set in The World of Mythrid, which is divided into 6 regions: the castle of Grimodal, the Old City (Red and Blue), the Slave Graveyard, the Curtain of Star Trees and the Dragon Princess Inn.

== Development ==
The game was released in Japan on January 24, 2013. Some of the monsters and items from the prequel, Students of the Round, are included in Demon Gaze, but the game features new dungeons and new half-machine demons as well. The game features many prominent Japanese voice actors including Saori Hayami, Atsuko Tanaka, and Yukari Tamura.

=== Sequel ===
Development of a sequel title began in mid-2014. Demon Gaze II was released in Japan September 29, 2016. A Western release has been announced for and released in fall 2017 on PlayStation Vita and PlayStation 4.

== Reception ==
Reception

Aggregate scores
Aggregator	Score
GameRankings	70.66%
Metacritic	70/100

Review scores
Publication	Score
Destructoid	7/10
Famitsu	34/40
GameSpot	7/10
GamesRadar+	3/5
IGN	7.2/10
Hardcore Gamer	4/5
The Guardian	2/5

Demon Gaze currently holds a score of 70.66% at GameRankings, and 70/100 at Metacritic. Four Famitsu reviewers scored Demon Gaze 9, 9, 8 and 8 out of 10, for a total score of 34/40. The game sold 25,316 physical retail copies within the first week of release in Japan, and retail sales reached 47,993 by mid-February 2013. The game ranked as the sixth most purchased digital Vita game on the Japanese PlayStation Network in 2013. By April 2014, it was announced by Kadokawa Games that Demon Gaze shipped 180,000 copies worldwide, including both physical and download copies. A July 2014 announcement by Kadokawa later confirmed a global shipment figure of 200,000 copies.

Dale North of Destructoid also gave the game 7/10, claiming Demon Gaze to be "a solid game that definitely has an audience. Might lack replay value, could be too short or there are some hard-to-ignore faults, but the experience is fun." Brittany Vincent of GamesRadar rewarded the game three stars out of five, summarising the game up as "colorful, brash, and spunky, but it's little more than a wonky journey through dungeon after forgettable dungeon. If it's a grind you're looking for, you can do far better than the mediocrity of becoming a Demon Gazer." Heidi Kemps of GameSpot scored the game 7/10, finding the battles, dungeons and characters to be enjoyable, though the story, visual style and the heavy amount of fan service was criticised. Josiah Renaudin of IGN rated the game a 7.2/10, praising the combat and characters, but criticising the uninspired visuals and "cookie-cutter premise."

Marcus Estrada of Hardcore Gamer gave the game a 4/5, calling it "a very mechanically sound dungeon crawler," and that "the biggest hurdle to enjoying the game is simply your tastes for (or tolerance of) copious displays of fan service." James Stephanie Sterling of The Escapist gave Demon Gaze a more positive review, as well as recommending the game, stating "this is easily one of the more addictive ones I've enjoyed for a while, and it's perfect on Vita", and scoring it 4.5/5. Nevertheless, Matt Kamen of The Guardian rated Demon Gaze much lower, giving the game only 2 stars out of 5, as "Demon Gaze does make nice use of the Vita's online functions, allowing for notes left between players advising of secrets or dangers, but it's not enough to make up for a resoundingly lacklustre package."
