= M&M's Adventure (2008 video game) =

- Developer: Nikitova Games
- Publisher: Zoo Games
- Platforms: Nintendo DS, Wii
- Release: Wii: NA: December 3, 2008; Nintendo DS: NA: December 3, 2008; PAL: April 25, 2008
- Genre: action-adventure video game
- Mode: Single-player

M&M's Adventure is a 2008 action-adventure video game released on the Nintendo DS and Wii video game consoles by Zoo Games and developed by Nikitova Games.

== Gameplay ==
In the beginning only Red is playable but as the game progresses, one can play as Yellow who has the power to double jump, and Green who can attack with a racket. In the lobby, there are parts blocked by doors with the face of a character which requires the use of that character (depending on the color and image of the door M&M only that M&M can enter). The game has one boss in each world, and the final boss is a snowman.

The Factory works as a Lobby in which the player can access the different levels all based on different festivities, which are: Valentine's Day, Easter, Fourth of July, Halloween, and Christmas being the final scenery and the central festivity in the story.

== Plot ==
The game takes place around Christmas, with Green, Yellow, and Red in charge of the M&M's factory. However, due to a system error, the harvested candies are ejected and all of the factory's robots go rogue, so the M&M's embark on a quest to stop the system error and save the factory.

== Reception ==
Reception

Aggregate score
| Aggregator | Score |
|---|---|
| Metacritic | (Wii) 34/100 |

Review score
| Publication | Score |
|---|---|
| GameZone | 2.1/10 |

The Wii version of M&M's Adventure received "generally unfavorable" reviews from critics, according to the review aggregation website Metacritic. GameZone gave the game an overall rating of 2.1 out of 10.
