= List of artificial pet games =

A pet simulator game is a game about raising and caring for a virtual pet.

== Handheld electronic game ==
- Digital Monster (Digimon)
- Giga Pet
- Pokémon Pikachu
- Tamagotchi
- Pingu & Pinga Best Friends (Japanese: PINGU＆PINGA ちいさなともだち)

== Console or handheld ==
- 101 Shark Pets
- Animal Crossing (Animal Island minigame)
- Azure Dreams
- Digimon World
- Digimon World: Next Order
- Dog's Life
- Doko Demo Issyo
- Dragon Quest V
- Dragon Quest Monsters
- EyePet
- Final Fantasy VIII
- Final Fantasy XIII-2
- Hamsterz Life
- Hey You, Pikachu!
- Jade Cocoon
- Kinectimals
- Lufia II: Rise of the Sinistrals
- Megami Tensei
- Monster Rancher
- Neko Atsume
- Ni no Kuni
- Nintendogs
- Pokémon
  - Pokémon Breeder Mini
- Puppy Luv
- Purr Pals
- Robotrek
- Seaman
- SimAnimals
- Sonic Adventure and Sonic Adventure 2 (Chao raising minigame)
- Sonic Advance, Sonic Advance 2, and Sonic Pinball Party (Chao raising minigame on the Tiny Chao Garden)
- Viva Piñata
- Yo-Kai Watch

== Social network embedded ==
- Pet Society
- PetVille

== Mobile games ==
- My Talking Angela
- My Talking Tom
- My Talking Angela 2
- My Talking Tom Friends 2
- My Talking Hank:Islands
- Pocket Frogs
- Pou
- Dragonvale
- Peridot

== PC games ==
- Adopt Me!
- Animal Jam
- Black & White
- Busou Shinki Battle Rondo
- Creatures
- Fin Fin on Teo the Magic Planet
- Fish Tycoon
- GoPets
- Insaniquarium
- MOPy fish
- PF.Magic's Petz series
- Puppy Luv
- The Sims 2: Pets
- The Sims 3: Pets
- The Sims 4: Cats & Dogs
- The Sims: Unleashed
- Neopets
- Webkinz
- Wobbledogs
- Zoo Tycoon 2

== Browser-based games ==
List of browser-based games
Title	Gameplay	Founder/developer	Release date	Revenue model
Shining Stars	Virtual world	Russ Berrie	2006	
Horse Isle	Horse-based Breeding simulation, horse riding, questing and flash-based virtual world	Horse Isle	2010	
Horseland	Breeding simulation	Christina (Gerskovich) Johnson	1995	
Howrse	Horse breeding game	Owlient	2005	Free-to-play with in game purchases
Moshi Monsters	Virtual world	Mind Candy	2007	
Neopets	Virtual world	Neopets Inc. (Owned by JumpStart)	November 15, 1999	Subscription, advertising, merchandise
Webkinz	Virtual world	Ganz	April 29, 2005	Merchandise, digital content

== See also ==
- Virtual pet
