= List of Talking Tom & Friends television shows =

The following is a list of television shows under the Talking Tom & Friends franchise created by Outfit7. The first series was Talking Friends, which premiered in June 2012, and was based on the games. As of February 2026, there are a total of 6 television series, with 2 ongoing.

== Overview ==
Series	Season	Episodes		Originally released	
Series	Season	Episodes		First released	Last released
Talking Friends	1	10		June 8, 2012	August 31, 2012
Talking Tom Shorts	1	47		March 13, 2014	October 24, 2018
Talking Tom Shorts	2	55	13	July 18, 2019	July 23, 2020
Talking Tom Shorts	2	55	42	August 20, 2020	August 10, 2023
Talking Tom Shorts	3	TBA		September 7, 2023	TBA
Talking Tom Shorts	Special			May 18, 2023	
Talking Tom & Friends	1	52		December 23, 2014	December 22, 2016
Talking Tom & Friends	Minisodes	8		February 5, 2015	February 4, 2016
Talking Tom & Friends	2	26		June 15, 2017	March 8, 2018
Talking Tom & Friends	3	26		May 12, 2018	December 27, 2018
Talking Tom & Friends	4	26		May 16, 2019	March 27, 2020
Talking Tom & Friends	5	26		May 8, 2020	December 24, 2021
Talking Tom & Friends Minis	1	60		March 3, 2016	July 4, 2018
Talking Tom Heroes	1	52		April 26, 2019	December 16, 2021
Talking Tom Heroes: Suddenly Super	1	52		January 14, 2025	TBA

== List ==
=== Talking Friends ===
Talking Friends was the first animated web series of the Talking Tom and Friends franchise. It was produced by Disney Interactive Studios, and ran on YouTube from June 8 to August 31, 2012, for 10 episodes.

=== Talking Tom & Friends ===
Outfit7 launched a 3D animated series called Talking Tom and Friends in December 2014, later renamed Talking Tom & Friends, based on the antics of Talking Tom and his friends. The show's first 3 seasons were produced by the Austrian animation studio ARX Anima, while the Spanish animation studio People Moving Pixels produced seasons 4 and 5.

=== Talking Tom Shorts ===
Talking Tom Shorts is an ongoing web series distributed by Outfit7 and based on My Talking series. The show revolves the lives of Tom, Ben, Angela, Ginger and Hank, and it later features another character referred to as the hand. Unlike the TV series, none of the characters have dialogue, and the show extensively uses slapstick comedy. It is currently available on YouTube.

=== Talking Tom & Friends Minis ===
Talking Tom & Friends Minis is a 2D animated web series featuring characters from the franchise. The characters are presented without any particular language dialogue. It is co-developed and produced by Outfit7 and Plenus.

=== Talking Tom Heroes ===
Talking Tom Heroes is an animated series by Outfit7. It premiered on April 26, 2019, on YouTube. It also aired on Boomerang in Asia and on Pop in the United Kingdom.

=== Talking Tom Heroes: Suddenly Super ===
Talking Tom Heroes: Suddenly Super is a 3D animated series by Outfit7 and Epic Story Media, a company that has worked on other TV shows such as Slugterra and Pocoyo, it was announced on July 9, 2021, and was released January 14, 2025. It follows the characters as they work as superheroes while maintaining a civilian identity.
