= List of Talking Tom Heroes episodes =

Talking Tom Heroes is an animated series by Outfit7. It premiered on April 26, 2019, on YouTube. It also aired on Boomerang in Asia and on Pop in the United Kingdom.

== Series overview ==
Series	Season	Episodes	Originally released	
Series	Season	Episodes	First released	Last released
Talking Tom Heroes	1	52	April 26, 2019	December 16, 2021

== Episodes ==
No.	Title	Directed by	Written by	Runtime	Release date	Ref.
1	"Fire Breathing Magic Dinosaur"	Minjolli	Youngeun Seo	6:13	April 26, 2019	
Ben creates a device that can create anything that is drawn on it. When Ginger draws a fire-breathing dinosaur and it starts causing chaos, the friends work to erase all their creations, and succeed.
2	"Beat the Racoon"	Minjolli	Wonjun Lee	5:59	April 26, 2019	
When the Raccoon Robber refuses to keep quiet in the library and gets thrown out, he returns and takes everyone hostage so that he can keep on making noise with a machine that can make musical notes that can trap people. Ben and Hank initially manage to catch him, but get caught themselves, leaving Tom and Angela to save the library. Tom and Angela succeed and deactivate the invention, only for Ginger to use it, not knowing what it really is.
3	"Giant Bubble Trouble"	Minjolli	Dahye Min	6:08	April 26, 2019	
When Ginger tries to make bubbles but fails, Ben makes a device that can create big and impervious bubbles for Ginger. When Ginger shows it off to his friends, another child tries to steal the device from him, and damages it in doing so, causing it to make bubbles and trap all the children. Tom and the gang work to catch all the children and take them to safety.
4	"The Missing Hero Crystal"	Minjolli	Dahye Min	6:53	April 26, 2019	
Tom drops his crystal when fighting Ben and Hank for fun, and Ginger takes it. However, he accidentally drops it into the sewer, when Tom and the gang go to rescue a beached whale. Ginger and Angela recover Tom's hero crystal from the sewers and give it back to Tom in the nick of time.
5	"Attack of the Garbage Monster"	Minjolli	K.J. Lee	6:25	May 2, 2019	
Tom and the gang celebrate Angela's birthday and create a lot of litter. The garbage turns into a garbage monster that can turn anything it touches into trash. The gang attempts to stop the monster and succeed by dousing it with water.
6	"Celebrity Trap"	Minjolli	Youngeun Seo	6:06	May 8, 2019	
When Tom saves a human boy from a building which was on fire and gets featured on the news, he starts to act more like a washed-up celebrity than a friend and a hero, to his friends' annoyance. Later, Tom goes alone to clear up a landslide, but spends his time showing off instead of working, and clears up the landslide only with his friends' help. When the news crew arrives, however, he credits his friends as well, having learnt his lesson.
7	"The Curse of the Pyramid"	Minjolli	Sohyun Lee	6:27	July 18, 2019	
The friends visit a pyramid, when the Raccoon Robber steals numerous artefacts and a sceptre, unleashing a curse that destroys the pyramid and unleashes small creatures that will stop anyone from reversing the curse. The gang catches the Raccoon Robber and returns the sceptre to its stand, undoing the curse.
8	"Mad Car"	Minjolli	Hyeong Gyu Choi	7:08	August 1, 2019	
Tom's car breaks down when he tries racing against a driver in a sports car, and Ben repairs it. Ben also fills it with a liquid that makes it go faster, warning Tom not to use too much of it. Tom ignores Ben's warning, and uses multiple bottles of the liquid, and the car develops a mind of its own and wreaks havoc, speeding and swerving into traffic. Tom and his friends trap the car, and Tom stops the car before it runs over a pedestrian.
9	"The Lonely Yeti"	Minjolli	Dahye Min	17:09	August 15, 2019	
The friends play in the snow, throwing snowballs at each other, when Ginger sees a yeti, which wants to play with him. He rushes off to tell his friends, but when they look, the yeti is missing. The friends return to town, and the yeti follows them. Initially, everyone runs to shelter, and the yeti starts playing, gaining everyone's trust, only to lose it when his fangs are seen. The yeti, now saddened, cries and starts to ice up everything in doing so. Tom and the friends try to stop him, when Ginger arrives and calms the yeti down. Note: The total duration includes that of episodes 03 and 04
10	"Stop the Slime!"	Minjolli	–	16:27	June 28, 2019	
The friends, along with the yeti, make slime, when the yeti ruins his by accident. Ben gives his slime and adds a drop of a chemical that makes it extra-slimey, when a mugful of it touches Hank's slime. The slime turns into a candy-loving monster that causes chaos in the city. The friends successfully stop the monster with the yeti's help. Note: The total duration includes that of episodes 02 and 05
11	"Boat Race Sabotage"	Minjolli	Won Jun Lee	16:47	July 11, 2019	
The friends participate in a boat race, where the Raccoon Robber sabotages Angela's boat. Angela ends up in last place, and realising that the Raccoon Robber had sabotaged her, uses her powers to overtake everyone and stop the Raccoon Robber from winning. Meanwhile, the Raccoon Robber sabotages other players as well, and distracts Angela into going the wrong way. Angela saves another racer who was in danger, and the Raccoon Robber is disqualified after the friends get proof of his cheating, with first place being given to Angela. Note: The total duration includes that of episodes 06 and 07
12	"The Hungry Vacuum Cleaner"	Minjolli	K.J. Lee	17:56	July 25, 2019	
Hank steals his friends' food to make a sandwich, to his friends' annoyance, and refuses to share the sandwich. Meanwhile, a disposed off vacuum cleaner develops a mind of its own and a taste for food. When it finds Hank and begs for his sandwich, Hank refuses to share, and the vacuum sucks him in and leaves to steal food from others. The friends rescue Hank and shut down the vacuum cleaner, but Hank accidentally turns it back on when trying to take back his sandwich. The friends try to stop the vacuum, which by now has become a big monster, and Hank stops it by offering it food, and the vacuum peacefully leaves. Note: The total duration includes that of episodes 03 and 08
13	"Sugar Tornado Alert"	Minjolli	K.J. Lee	18:18	August 8, 2019	
A cotton candy vendor, who considers his customers to be money, run out of cotton candy. So, he goes to the factory and speeds up the machinery. When the machinery goes out of control, it initially starts snowing cotton candy, but soon, tornadoes made of it ensue. The friends reach the factory to stop the machinery, get the vacuum cleaner from the previous episode to vacuum up the mess and make the vendor give his cotton candy for free instead as punishment. Note: The total duration includes that of episodes 04 and 09
14	"Power Thief"	Minjolli	Sohyun Lee	17:00	August 22, 2019	
The friends suffer in summer while Ben repairs their air conditioner. Meanwhile, the Raccoon Robber steals people's fans and air conditioners for himself. When he experiences a blackout, he redirects power from the power station so that no one else gets electricity. The gang fights the Raccoon to stop him and destroys his computer with which he commits all his crimes. Note: The total duration includes that of episodes 08 and 02
15	"Invasion of the Moles"	Minjolli	–	17:31	September 5, 2019	
Tom helps Angela tend her garden, when moles invade it. When the garden is ruined, the friends rebuild it, and Ben waters them with a chemical to increase yield. Tom and Angela stand guard, but fall asleep, and the moles again ruin the garden. However, since the food was sprayed on, the chemical makes the moles aggressive and evil-minded. Tom, Angela and Hank fight to stop the moles while Ben creates an antidote, and solve the problem. Later, they choose to feed the moles. Note: The total duration includes that of episodes 05 and 12
16	"Ultra Eating Championship"	Minjolli	Eui Jin Kim	16:29	September 19, 2019	
Hank participates in an eating contest, in which he is in last place. All other competitors lose after collapsing, except for one. Spurred on by his friends, Hank wins at the last moment, infuriating his opponent, who starts demanding everyone's food. Hank challenges him to another contest, while his friends make him drink a can full of chilli sauce, giving him a bad case of diarrhoea. Note: The total duration includes that of episodes 09 and 01
17	"The Little Turtle"	Minjolli	K.J. Lee	18:10	October 3, 2019	
Ginger plays superhero with his pet turtle, when he spills orange juice on its costume. While Ginger cleans the costume, the turtle falls into the toilet, and ends up in the ocean after going through the drains. Meanwhile Ginger and his friends go to the ocean to find the turtle. After they initially goof around, a giant octopus picks a fight with them, when Ginger sees his turtle. He swims to catch it, when the octopus catches him, when the turtle sees him. The turtle arrives with its mother and bites the octopus, freeing Ginger, and Ginger and the turtle say their goodbyes as Ginger lets the turtle live with its family. Note: The total duration includes that of episodes 07 and 13
18	"The Jealous Pumpkin"	Minjolli	Bu Yong Hong	16:52	October 17, 2019	
Hank and another farmer are competing in a pumpkin growing contest, when the farmer destroys all of Hank's pumpkins, but misses one. Hank finds out and installs security, and tends to his plant while the farmer uses too much fertiliser at a single spot. A giant pumpkin starts to kill all nearby plants by sucking nutrients, and the friends kill it by plugging its veins. The next day, Hank wins the pumpkin contest, to the farmer's annoyance. Note: The total duration includes that of episodes 10 and 14
19	"Haunted Toy House"	Minjolli	Sohyun Lee	16:47	October 24, 2019	
Tom wins a jewelled box for Angela, which contains a doll wearing a necklace. Angela takes the necklace for herself, and the doll comes to life. It makes the house seem haunted and makes the toys come to life. Angela and her friends stop the doll and trap it, and get it destroyed by the Crystal Mentor. Note: The total duration includes that of episodes 05 and 16
20	"Hank the Robber"	Minjolli	Bu Yong Hong	17:21	November 7, 2019	
While Hank is alone, the Raccoon Robber hypnotises him, and makes him rob for him. Hank, however, brings things that the Raccoon considers worthless. Meanwhile, Tom, Angela and Ben look for Hank on finding out what happened to him, and the Raccoon Robber follows Hank when he goes to the hero hideout. There, he chooses to steal the crystals giving the Crystal Mentor his powers, and succeeds. Hank's friends return and try to destroy the hypnotic machine, and eventually succeed and return the stolen crystals, and the Crystal Mentor sends the Raccoon Robber to an unknown place and reverses the damage done in the fighting. Note: The total duration includes that of episodes 08 and 18
21	"The Sad Clown"	Minjolli	Won Jun Lee	16:20	November 21, 2019	
At the circus, Ginger cheers for a clown who tries to perform well, while the rest of the audience heckles him. Depressed, he uses his invention to steal people's happiness and uses it on the audience while performing so as to be appreciated. Tom and the gang try to release the stolen happiness but get sprayed with it by the clown, when Ginger arrives and shows his tickets. The clown remembers how Ginger appreciated him, repents his mistake and releases the stolen happiness. Note: The total duration includes that of episodes 03 and 06
22	"Mission Toothache!"	Minjolli	Bonbu Kim	16:32	December 5, 2019	
Hank gets a toothache, so his friends take him to a dentist. However, Hank refuses to be treated, so Ben invents a shrinking device, and shrinks himself, Tom and Angela so that they can get rid of the naughty germs, while Ginger makes sure Hank doesn't hamper them while asleep. The friends get rid of the toothache, and force Hank to brush his teeth. Note: The total duration includes that of episodes 02 and 11
23	"Angela's Evil Twin"	Minjolli	Bonbu Kim	17:55	December 19, 2019	
Tom and Angela are given a helmet and a mirror by a mysterious old woman. Later, an identical copy of Angela emerges from the mirror, steals Angela's hero crystal and costume, and leaves to steal jewels for the old woman. Angela and her friends chase and trap the thief, and at one point, both Angelas claim to be real. Tom finds which one is real, and gets rid of the clone and the mirror. Note: The total duration includes that of episodes 13 and 19
24	"Mysterious Backpack World"	Minjolli	Won Jun Lee	17:20	December 26, 2019	
After his friends keep on leaving him alone to stop villains and solve problems, a bored Ginger finds a squirrel and befriends it. One day, the squirrel jumps into Hank's backpack and Ginger jumps in after it – so Tom, Angela and Ben go in to get Ginger and the squirrel. Note: The total duration includes that of episodes 12 and 21
25	"Holiday Hero Training"	Minjolli	Youngeun Seo	16:34	January 9, 2020	
The friends travel to China on holiday, and at a beach, Angela wears her hero mask and the Crystal Mentor tells them to go to a nearby monastery for training. At the monastery, Tom's friends pay attention while Tom, not showing interest, tries to sneak off. Tom accidentally knocks down a jar containing an evil spirit which traps the monks and Tom's friends. Tom single-handedly frees his friends and they trap the monster, breaking its curse, and head for the beach. Note: The total duration includes that of episodes 16 and 20
26	"The Shadows"	Minjolli	–	16:45	January 23, 2020	
After Tom bounces on a trampoline and gets electrocuted by an overhead light which he had hit, Tom's shadow develops a mind of its own. Initially, it stays with him, but it leaves after being ignored and neglected. It then scares Angela, Ben and Hank, getting them electrocuted and creating more shadows. The shadows start scaring people by shape-shifting, and when Tom and his friends try to catch them, they fail. Hank then brings his vacuum cleaner friend and succeeds in trapping the shadows and re-attaching them to themselves. Note: The total duration includes that of episodes 18 and 22
27	"The Super Ballerina"	Minjolli	–	16:53	February 6, 2020	
Angela becomes a ballerina fan, and learns it. However, she fails to perform well, and asks Ben to invent a costume that can make Angela dance well. The costume works well, until Angela accidentally tears it, and the costume starts changing into various other costumes, like hula dancers and karatekas and controlling Angela's movements. Tom successfully destroys the costume, but after he, Ben and Hank laugh at Angela's inability to perform well, she makes them join classes. Note: The total duration includes that of episodes 14 and 17
28	"The Angry Hero"	Minjolli	–	16:27	February 20, 2020	
After Ben repeatedly does his part in saving the day, but doesn't get any credit, he ignores his friends and refuses to report to the hero hideout. His friends leave to save a clown from an accident, but Angela also gets caught in the same situation. Meanwhile, the Crystal Mentor ropes Ben to the hero hideout, reprimands him and shows him that Angela is in trouble. Ben goes to save the clown, while Angela had saved herself, and saves him at the last second, and gets credited this time. Note: The total duration includes that of episodes 15 and 23
29	"Robber on the Train!"	Minjolli	–	16:17	March 5, 2020	
The Raccoon Robber takes over a goods train carrying gold, and Tom and the gang chase it and tie up the thief, only to find that the train can't stop and will fall into a town at the bottom of a valley. After Tom fails to stop the train using brute strength, Ben suggests using a giant rubber band, and the plan initially seems to work, but the band snaps and the friends, with the Raccoon Robber's help, pull back the train. After the heroes congratulate him, he runs off with gold, resuming their chase. Note: The total duration includes that of episodes 19 and 03
30	"Ginger the Special Agent"	Minjolli	Youngeun Seo and others	17:15	March 19, 2020	
Ginger goes around the neighbourhood with his pet squirrel, trying to solve people's problems, when he bumps into a suspicious-looking man with a mask. Thinking that he is a robber, Ginger funs off to warn his friends, but when they arrive, they see him ostensibly repairing something, and reprimand Ginger for the false alarm. After the friends leave, Ginger sees the man going down a hole, and follows him, and finds out that the man has connected the sewer lines and the water lines so that he can sell water. Ginger sabotages the connection, and the man returns to investigate and catches Ginger, but not before he sends his pet squirrel to warn the friends. The friends follow the squirrel, only to discover that Ginger has single-handedly defeated the man. Note: The total duration includes that of episodes 09 and 04
31	"The Big Bubble Fight in the Laundry"	Minjolli	Youngeun Seo and others	16:53	April 2, 2020	
Tom and his friends visit a museum, where the Raccoon Robber coincidentally steals a gem, and the security raises the alarm. While putting it in his bag, he finds out that it can make any inanimate object come to life. While trying to escape from the police and the superheroes, the Raccoon Robber hides in a laundry shop, and accidentally throws the gem into a washing machine, which then tries to wash him. Tom and the friends then try and save the Raccoon Robber, and remove the gem and make the Raccoon Robber clean up the mess. Note: The total duration includes that of episodes 24 and 13
32	"Frozen Friendship"	Minjolli	–	16:23	April 16, 2020	
The friends visit Ginger's friend, the yeti, and Ginger builds a snow-castle with him. Ginger uses his RC train to bring snow for the castle, and lets the yeti use it. Later, the remote goes missing, and Ginger blames the yeti and goes back home with his friends. At their home, Hank realises that he had taken the remote thinking it was for a TV, and Ginger goes back to the yeti's house to apologise. The yeti, not knowing where the remote is, starts crying and causes a storm. Tom and his friends go after Ginger to save him but when he gets stuck in the middle of a frozen lake which is cracking, they instead calm the yeti down, and get the yeti to help save him. Note: The total duration includes that of episodes 20 and 16
33	"The Labyrinth Mystery"	Minjolli	–	16:51	April 23, 2020	
The friends visit a hedge maze, where the Raccoon Robber starts trapping people by shutting the walls. The friends change into superheroes, and Angela notices him, but the Raccoon Robber snatches her superhero mask and uses it to exit the maze and breaks into bank vaults. Meanwhile, the friends create a decoy for the Raccoon Robber, and trap him, but he escapes the trap. The friends, however, manage to trick him and recover the mask, while sending him back to the hedge maze and trapping him inside. Note: The total duration includes that of episodes 14 and 25
34	"Lazy Heroes"	Minjolli	–	16:47	May 14, 2020	
After the friends misuse their powers to solve their personal problems, the Crystal Mentor takes them to a training ground, where Ginger is the coach. The friends reach the end of the course using their powers, so the Crystal Mentor takes their crystals away and sends them to the beginning. However, Ginger accidentally steps on a button, trapping himself above a pool infested with crocodiles. Tom, Angela, Ben and Hank then reach the end of the course and save Ginger without their powers, but fall in the pool. The Crystal Mentor then gets rid of the crocodiles, explains their wrongdoing and returns their crystals, much to their joy. Note: The total duration includes that of episodes 23 and 18
35	"Talking Tom Fights the Giant Crab"	Minjolli	–	11:05	May 29, 2020	
Tom, Angela, Hank and Ben go to the beach, where Ben uses his new invention to shrink their baggage and make going to the shade easier. Hank later tries to use the device to enlarge his sandwich, but Ben fights him over it and the invention instead enlarges a crab. The crab goes on a rampage, terrorising people, and the friends try to stop it. When their attempts fail, Ben enlarges Tom and has him fight the crab while Ben fixes the invention. When Tom also is unable to hold off the crab, Angela kicks coconuts at the crab, but hits Tom, and Ben gets an idea to have Angela kick coconuts and enlarge them midair, and knocks out the crab, and shrink it. Later, Hank again asks to use the invention on the sandwich, but Ben shrinks Hank with it, to the latter's delight. Note: The total duration includes that of episode 24
36	"Baby Potion"	Minjolli	Youngeun Seo and others	33:49	June 11, 2020	
Ben works on his news invention, and resorts to using his glove, when the witch from Episode 23 notices him. She disguises herself as a delivery person, and turns Ben into a baby, but flees before taking the glove when he cries. Ben's friends find him when they run into the room hearing the commotion, and take care of him. Later, while the friends go for a walk, the witch arrives in disguise and takes Ben to his home while Tom, Angela and Hank report to the Crystal Mentor, and ransacks the room, leaving a booby trap which turns Tom into a baby when they find Ben's room ransacked. Later, Angela and Hank find the witch ransacking Tom's house, and give chase, and corner her in a warehouse. The two groups fight, when a big crate falls onto Tom, who holds it with his powers, and defeats the witch by throwing it at her. Later, the witch is forced to turn Tom and Ben back to normal, and she disappears to everyone's relief. Note: The total duration includes that of episodes 21, 13, 20, 19 and 09
37	"The Pearl Robber and a Shark"	Minjolli	Youngeun Seo and others	16:05	June 25, 2020	
The friends visit an aquarium, where the Raccoon Robber steals a pearl. The friends then give chase, when the Raccoon Robber breaks a glass wall, freeing a shark, and then use the shark to catch the robber, and then return the shark to its enclosure after fixing it. Note: The total duration includes that of episodes 27 and 30
38	"Broken Power Crystal"	Minjolli	Youngeun Seo and others	31:09	July 10, 2020	
Hank's power crystal gets broken when the friends save a child from a malfunctioning lift. Later, he tries to use it to return to the heroes' headquarters, but instead ends up in a different place, and uses it again and again to escape from danger in each place until he reaches a jungle inhabited by a tribe of live pineapples. His friends find him being treated as the king of the tribe (as he gifted them with the contents of his bag) and bring Hank and his bag back safely by distracting the tribe, and get it fixed. Hank then goes back to the tribe to recover the fruits he was gifted with. Note: The total duration includes that of episodes 28, 25, 29, 18 and 31
39	"New Hero on the Block"	Minjolli	Youngeun Seo and others	31:09	July 25, 2020	
Ginger daydreams of being a superhero like his friends, when they leave. Then Ginger goes to Ben's house and finds Ben's pencil and board from Episode 1 that could create anything that is drawn on it, and uses it to make a power crystal of his own. Then he uses it to go to his friends' hero headquarters, and gets a new hero costume elevator of his own. However, he tries to use his powers, inadvertently damaging the hero headquarters, when Tom, Angela, Hank, and Ben return and see what happened. Ginger leaves in shame, and later disposes off his crystal. Meanwhile, the friends use their powers to fix the hero headquarters, and leave to fight a garbage-spewing monster. Ginger notices his power crystal glowing and uses it again, and attacks the monster while his friends have been defeated, but the garbage monster breaks Ginger's hoverboard. Ginger then uses Ben's device to draw elephants that destroy the monster with water., Ben fixes his hoverboard with his magnetic glove. Ginger becomes happy.
40	"Rainbow Color Rampage"	Minjolli	Youngeun Seo and others	31:09	August 8, 2020	
Tom has trouble repainting his café, so Ben gives him a device that can change the colour of any item. The Racoon Robber walks by and notices the device, and decides to steal it to turn bricks into gold. He steals it while Tom attends to a customer, and Tom and his friends give chase. They find that the racoon has stolen bricks, and that the tool can only repaint items but not change them. They then corner the Racoon Robber at a construction site, where Ben damages the device, causing it to malfunction. Ben then repairs it while his friends chase the raccoon, and creates a fake open manhole as a trap for the raccoon, and catches him. They then make the racoon repaint their café.
41	"Revenge of the Garbage Monster"	Minjolli	Youngeun Seo	TBA	September 10, 2020	TBA
42	"Pancakes and Dinosaurs"	Minjolli	Youngeun Seo	TBA	October 8, 2020	TBA
43	"Stinky Angela"	Minjolli	Youngeun Seo	TBA	November 12, 2020	TBA
44	"The Sneaky Witch"	Minjolli	Youngeun Seo	TBA	December 10, 2020	TBA
45	"Smoggy Monster"	Minjolli	Youngeun Seo	TBA	March 25, 2021	TBA
46	"Squirrel Transformer"	Minjolli	Youngeun Seo	TBA	April 22, 2021	TBA
47	"Hank's Superpower Swap"	Minjolli	Youngeun Seo	TBA	May 27, 2021	TBA
48	"Super-Photographer"	Minjolli	Youngeun Seo	TBA	August 19, 2021	TBA
49	"Candy Robber Chase"	Minjolli	Youngeun Seo	TBA	September 23, 2021	TBA
50	"Teeny Tiny Heroes"	Minjolli	Youngeun Seo	TBA	October 21, 2021	TBA
51	"Bandits United"	Minjolli	Youngeun Seo	TBA	November 25, 2021	TBA
52	"Friendship is a Superpower"	Minjolli	Youngeun Seo	TBA	December 16, 2021	TBA

== See also ==
- List of Talking Tom Shorts episodes
- Talking Tom & Friends (TV series)
