= List of Talking Tom & Friends games =

The following is a list of mobile video games developed and published by Outfit7 under the Talking Tom & Friends franchise.

== List ==
=== Talking Tom ===
Talking Tom (officially named as Talking Tom Cat) is an app released on June 26, 2010, by Outfit7, in which the title character, Tom, repeats anything said to him in a high-pitched voice, and interacts with the user.

=== Talking Baby Hippo ===
Talking Baby Hippo was an app released on July 16, 2010 in which the user interacts with a pink baby hippo which could repeat the words which the user says. It was removed from the app store in late 2016.

=== Talking Larry the Bird ===
Talking Larry the Bird was an app released on July 30, 2010, in which the user interacts with a Bird that can repeat what the user says. It then got removed from the app store in 2016.

=== Talking Roby the Robot ===
Talking Roby the Robot was an app released in 2010, in which the user interacts with a robot that can dance and repeat typed or spoken words. It was discontinued on December 31, 2013.

=== Talking Ben ===
Talking Ben (officially named as Talking Ben the Dog) is an app released in 2011 in which the user interacts with Ben. The character has been featured in numerous apps, and in every web series.

=== Talking Tom 2 ===
Talking Tom 2 (officially named as Talking Tom Cat 2) is the sequel to Talking Tom, released in 2011. It retains most of the features of its predecessor, adding its own features and improved graphics.

=== Talking News ===
Talking News (officially named as Talking Tom and Ben News) is an app released in 2011, in which Talking Tom and Talking Ben act as TV news anchors, repeating whatever is recorded and pulling pranks on each other.

=== Talking Pierre ===
Talking Pierre is an app released in 2011 in which the user interacts with a parrot named Pierre. Pierre has appeared in only one web series since being introduced — Talking Friends.

=== Talking Ginger ===
Talking Ginger is an app released in 2012 that lets the user interact with an orange kitten named Ginger and get him ready for bed. The character has been featured in numerous apps, and in every web series.

=== Talking Angela ===
Talking Angela is an app released in 2012 that was the target of a mudslinging campaign in which various individuals alleged that the app was created by paedophiles with the intent of tracking children, though no legitimate evidence was found proving these claims.

=== Talking Ginger 2 ===
Talking Ginger 2 (formerly Ginger's Birthday) is an app released in 2013, featuring Ginger. It allows the user to interact with Ginger at his birthday party. Until April 2014, the app was known as Ginger's Birthday.

=== Talking Ben AI ===
Talking Ben AI features Ben as a virtual assistant who responds to users' queries using AI. It was soft-launched in South Africa, Slovenia and Cyprus on August 29, 2023, on Android. As of May 2025 the app is no longer available.

=== My Talking Tom ===
My Talking Tom is a virtual pet video game released on November 11, 2013, that allows the user to take care of Tom as he grows, rename and customise him.

=== My Talking Angela ===
My Talking Angela is a virtual pet game released in 2014 that allows the user to take care of Angela as she grows, and rename and customise her.

=== Talking Tom Jetski ===
Talking Tom Jetski is a game released in 2015 in which the user either plays as Tom or Angela, riding on a jet ski to complete missions. As of October 2025, the app is no longer available.

=== Talking Tom Bubble Shooter ===
Talking Tom Bubble Shooter is a bubble-shooting game like the similar Puzzle Bobble and Bubble Bobble. released in 2015. As of June 2021, the app is no longer available.

=== Talking Tom Gold Run ===
Talking Tom Gold Run is an endless runner game released in 2016, in which the player, as Tom, Angela, Ben, Hank, Ginger or Becca, chases Roy Rakoon, a Raccoon robber while collecting gold bars.

=== My Talking Hank: Islands ===
My Talking Hank is a virtual pet game released in 2017, in which the user takes care of Hank. My Talking Hank: Islands is a relaunch that was soft-launched in 2023 and released globally in 2024.

=== Talking Angela Color Splash ===
Talking Angela Color Splash is a match-3 game released in 2017. As of June 2025, the app is no longer available.

=== Talking Tom Camp ===
Talking Tom Camp was a strategy game released in 2017 (early access) and 2018 (global release) , in which the player builds a camp while attacking enemy camps. As of november 2020, the app is no longer available due to shutdowns.

=== Talking Tom Pool ===
Talking Tom Pool is a game released in 2017 in which the player builds a waterpark. As of June 2025, the app is no longer available.

=== Talking Tom Jetski 2 ===
Talking Tom Jetski 2 is a jetski racing video-game released in 2018. It has different mechanics from Talking Tom Jetski. As of 2023, the app is no longer available in the Google Play Store.

=== Talking Tom Candy Run ===
Talking Tom Candy Run is an endless runner game released in 2018. As of November 2025, the app is no longer available in the Google Play Store & App Store and at October 2026, the app was comeback.

=== Talking Tom Cake Jump ===
Talking Tom Cake Jump is an endless jumper game released in 2018. As of June 2025, the app is no longer available.

=== Talking Tom Jump Up ===
Talking Tom Jump Up is the second endless jumper game released in 2018. As of June 2025, the app is no longer available.

=== My Talking Tom 2 ===
My Talking Tom 2 is a virtual pet game released in 2018. It is a sequel to My Talking Tom.

=== Talking Tom Fun Fair ===
Talking Tom Fun Fair is a match-3 game like the similar Gardenscapes. released in 2019 in which the player rebuilds an abandoned amusement park. As of June 2025, the app has been removed by Outfit7. (Note: Apple App Store only.)

=== Talking Tom Hero Dash ===
Talking Tom Hero Dash is an endless runner game released in 2019 that is similar to Talking Tom Gold Run. The characters are superheroes and they fight against the Rakoonz.

=== Talking Tom Splash Force ===
Talking Tom Splash Force is a game in which the player uses water balloons to attack criminals.

=== My Talking Tom Friends ===
My Talking Tom Friends is a game where the player takes care of Tom initially, but later gets Angela, Hank, Ginger, Ben and Becca to take care of too. It was soft-launched in February 2020, before releasing globally on June 11, 2020.

=== My Talking Tom Friends 2 ===
My Talking Tom Friends 2 is a sequel of My Talking Tom Friends released in 2025, with the player having to take care of more "grown-up" versions of the same characters in the first game.

=== My Talking Angela 2 ===
My Talking Angela 2 is a virtual pet game released in spring 2021. It is a sequel to My Talking Angela.

=== Talking Tom Time Rush ===
Talking Tom Time Rush is an endless runner game released in 2021.

=== Talking Tom Blast Park ===
Talking Tom Blast Park is an endless shooter mobile game that was soft-launched internationally on October 2020 with Tom, Angela, Hank, Tom's new pet Squeak, Ben, Becca and Ginger. The game states that half of the characters (Angela, Hank, Squeak, Becca, Ben and Ginger) are coming soon, who are unlocked through player achievements. However, the game was withdrawn in 2024 before it was re-launched as an exclusive through Apple Arcade on December 5, 2024.

=== Talking Tom & Friends: World ===
Talking Tom & Friends: World is a 2D game where the player has to take care of Tom, Angela, Ben, Hank, Ginger and Becca (similar to the first and second game) released in 2025.
