= List of Talking Tom & Friends Minis episodes =

Talking Tom & Friends Minis is a 2D animated web series featuring Talking Tom and his friends. The characters are presented without any particular language dialogue. It is co-developed and produced by Outfit7 and Plenus. The show was released from March 2016 to July 2018.

== Series overview ==
Series	Season	Episodes	Originally released	
Series	Season	Episodes	First released	Last released
Talking Tom & Friends Minis	1	60	March 3, 2016	July 4, 2018

== Episodes ==
No.	Title	Directed by	Written by	Runtime	Release date	Ref.
M1	"New Year's Eve"	Minjolli	Hyewon Kwon and Heinrich Beck	3:44	December 27, 2015 (JAP); January 12, 2023 (USA)	
Talking Tom and the gang celebrate New Year's Eve with great friends, good food, and fireworks.
M2	"The Big Move"	Minjolli	Hyewon Kwon	3:56	March 3, 2016	
Tom and his friends move next to Angela's house.
M3	"A Rough Start"	Minjolli	Hyewon Kwon	3:33	March 17, 2016	
The friends have a bad day – Tom is unable to play sports, Ben is a terrible driver and Tom's attempt to hit it off with Angela in the evening fails.
M4	"Boy Meets Girl"	Minjolli	Hyewon Kwon	3:32	March 31, 2016	
Tom wants to meet Angela, but Angela makes Tom wait out in the cold for too long while she gets dressed up.
M5	"The Perfect Dress"	Minjolli	Hyewon Kwon	3:50	May 5, 2016	
Angela orders a dress and becomes very impatient when it seemingly takes forever to arrive.
M6	"Spring Date"	Minjolli	Hyewon Kwon	3:14	May 19, 2016	
Tom and Angela go to a park for a picnic.
M7	"Part Time Job"	Minjolli	Hyewon Kwon	3:28	June 2, 2016	
Tom finds his new job in the cafeteria to be exhausting, but his friends come to visit him and cheer him up.
M8	"Camping Trip"	Minjolli	Hyewon Kwon	4:02	June 16, 2016	
The friends go on a camping trip, when their car runs out of fuel. The friends decide to set up camp by the roadside, when they get caught in a rainstorm, and get wet even in their tent because it has holes. Soon, the weather clears up, and the friends can't agree on what to do as recreation, when they find out that they have nothing to cook food with.
M9	"Fortune Cookies"	Minjolli	Hyewon Kwon	3:20	June 30, 2016	
Tom and Angela buy fortune cookies. Tom's predicts that he'll find love, while Angela's predicts bad luck. Tom tries to cheer Angela up by showing his fortune, while Angela buys another cookie, which predicts even more bad luck.
M10	"Tom's Sick Day"	Minjolli	Hyewon Kwon	3:15	July 14, 2016	
Tom gets sick after eating too much ice cream, and ends up standing Angela up on their date.
M11	"A Big Thank You"	Minjolli	Hyewon Kwon	3:33	July 28, 2016	
Tom gets his friends to help him with a surprise for Angela, but the surprise gets ruined by malfunctioning electronic candles.
M12	"Workout Time"	Minjolli	Hyewon Kwon	3:03	August 11, 2016	
Tom tries to do a strenuous workout after he sees Angela infatuated by a stronger and fitter cat.
M13	"Tom's New Love"	Minjolli	Hyewon Kwon	3:01	August 25, 2016	
Tom becomes obsessed with the "Talking Tom Gold Run" game (based on the game of the same name by Outfit7), and doesn't pay attention to Angela, making her mad, even though Tom tries to apologise. Ben, Hank and Ginger play the game when Ginger takes a picture that misleads Angela into thinking that Tom is still playing the game. Angela goes to Tom's house to yell at him, when Hank shows her Tom's apology video.
M14	"Diet Plan"	Minjolli	Hyewon Kwon	2:48	September 8, 2016	
Angela considers going on a diet after weighing herself on a scale, and desperately trains with Tom, who has no interest in dieting. In the end, Angela still weighs the same, and infuriated, she throws the scale out of her house.
M15	"Horror Movie Night"	Minjolli	Hyewon Kwon	2:50	September 15, 2016	
While watching a horror movie, Tom and Angela get spooked out by Hank and Ginger due to it being dark, and get spooked again by the pizza deliveryman.
M16	"Love is in the Air"	Minjolli	Hyewon Kwon	2:42	September 22, 2016	
Angela feels attracted to Tom when he starts doing housework like carrying boxes and nailing pictures to the wall for her, but as soon as Tom leaves, all the pictures fall off.
M17	"Summer Heat"	Minjolli	Hyewon Kwon	2:54	September 28, 2016	
In the middle of a heatwave, Tom and Hank (later Ben) play rock-paper-scissors to decide who fans the other, when Angela comes with a watermelon. Angela yells at Tom and Ben for spitting watermelon seeds at her, when they find Hank sleeping in the refrigerator.
M18	"Micro Tom"	Minjolli	Hyewon Kwon	2:45	October 6, 2016	
While fixing his TV antenna in the middle of a storm, Tom gets struck by lightning and gets shrunk, and then gets crushed by Hank as he is heading back home. Tom wakes up and yells at Hank, not realising that he had a nightmare.
M19	"Messy Guests"	Minjolli	Hyewon Kwon	2:44	October 13, 2016	
The gang visits Angela on her day off due to their water supply being shut off. However, Tom and his friends turn out to be terrible guests – Tom checks out all the rooms, Hank is a messy eater, Ginger tries Angela's jewellery and Ben uses his drone indoors, and Angela sends them away.
M20	"Underground Adventure"	Minjolli	Hyewon Kwon	3:06	October 20, 2016	
Angela finds a mysterious rock in her garden, and makes Tom dig and remove it. He finds a sign warning against trespassing, and Angela makes him, Hank and Ginger go in with her. They discover a hidden tunnel leading to a dead end with a sign warning against digging through it, and choose to dig through. The tunnel turns out to be leading to Ben's house in the basement.
M21	"Angela's Lost Phone"	Minjolli	Nada Song	3:12	November 30, 2016	
Tom tries to help Angela find her lost phone, but to no avail. Later, Angela finds it in her own stuff, and tries to hide the fact from Tom by throwing it across the compound wall into her garden, damaging her phone in doing so.
M22	"Camera Shy"	Minjolli	Nada Song	3:08	December 7, 2016	
Tom has a habit of freezing up when he gets his photo taken, so Hank, Ben and Ginger try to get Tom to pose nicely for a picture.
M23	"Lonely Boy Ginger"	Minjolli	Nada Song	3:05	December 14, 2016	
Ginger feels lonely as all his friends are busy, so Tom, Angela, Ben and Hank arrange fun activities for him.
M24	"The Lost Drone"	Minjolli	Nada Song	2:59	December 22, 2016	
Ben's drone malfunctions and snatches Ginger's favorite toy, dropping it on a climber. Ben goes through a lot of trouble in getting it back after a bird flies off with it, only to find out that Ginger had another identical toy.
M25	"New Year's Wishes"	Minjolli	Nada Song	3:24	December 29, 2016	
On the occasion of Lunar New Year, the gang paints lanterns which will be released into the sky, and arrives at the celebrations venue, only to find Hank missing. Hank arrives in time, and the friends release their lanterns.
M26	"Tom Against The Machine"	Minjolli	Nada Song	3:04	February 8, 2017	
Tom tries to get a Talking Tom plush toy for Angela, but fails. He steals coins from a nearby wishing fountain and manages to get every single toy in the machine.
M27	"Cooking Contest"	Minjolli	Nada Song	3:07	February 15, 2017	
Angela tries to prove that she's a good cook like Hank after she realises that Tom loves Hank's cooking, but not hers (Tom pretends to have enjoyed it), but fails even after going through so much trouble in cooking the food.
M28	"Angela Can't Sleep"	Minjolli	Nada Song	2:50	February 22, 2017	
Angela finds herself unable to sleep, so Tom tries to help her fall asleep.
M29	"Night of Shooting Stars"	Minjolli	Teller Park	2:37	March 1, 2017	
The friends try to stay awake all night to see shooting stars, but only Tom and Angela (who was woken up by Tom) get to see the shooting stars.
M30	"Tom Needs Help"	Minjolli	Choi Hyeong Gyu	2:50	March 8, 2017	
Tom's arm is broken, so Angela offers to run his café, but Tom is forced to run after her (quite literally) and make sure she doesn't ruin anything or make bad dishes.
M31	"Sneezing Tom and the Flower Festival"	Minjolli	Choi Hyeong Gyu	2:59	April 19, 2017	
Angela wants Tom to go with her to the Flower Festival, but Tom's pollen allergy causes problems – he sneezes at a passerby, sneezes his ice cream off the cone and ruins his and Angela's selfie.
M32	"Keep Away!"	Minjolli	Choi Hyeong Gyu	3:02	April 26, 2017	
Tom and Hank have a hard time being roommates together, and start dividing their furniture and belongings with tape unequally. Angela stops it by losing her temper on them and threatening to cut their belongings.
M33	"Ginger Wants to Sleep"	Minjolli	Choi Hyeong Gyu	3:25	May 3, 2017	
While his parents are away, Ginger goes everywhere trying to find a good place to sleep next to his friends, and ends up sleeping next to Ben then next to Angela. However, when they wake up, they find him missing – because he is sleeping in Hank's hammock.
M34	"Selfie Superstar"	Minjolli	Choi Hyeong Gyu	3:00	May 10, 2017	
Tom tries to become even more successful than Angela on social media, who takes fake pictures, by taking more elaborate fake pictures with Hank's help. Ginger becomes even more successful than Tom and Angela when he posts pictures showing how Tom made his pictures.
M35	"Angela's Pink Cake"	Minjolli	Choi Hyeong Gyu, Lee Eun Chong and Teller Park	3:40	May 24, 2017	
Tom and his friends rush to replace Angela's cake, which is bad, with one by Hank for Ginger's birthday. They succeed without Angela finding out, only for Angela to make them try her cookies.
M36	"Ginger the Date Crasher"	Minjolli	Choi Hyeong Gyu, Lee Eun Chong and Teller Park	3:19	June 7, 2017	
Tom and Angela do their best to keep Ginger from disturbing them and causing trouble on their date. Later, they get Hank to distract Ginger, but fail when Ben arrives.
M37	"The Movie Kiss"	Minjolli	Choi Hyeong Gyu, Lee Eun Chong and Teller Park	2:52	June 21, 2017	
Tom tries to kiss Angela, but fails repeatedly and behaves clumsily. In the evening, he misses his last chance as a fountain sprays water on him, and gets fever.
M38	"Hungry Hank"	Minjolli	Choi Hyeong Gyu, Lee Eun Chong and Teller Park	2:58	July 5, 2017	
Angela puts Hank on a diet and succeeds. Later, Hank brings home a box full of food.
M39	"The Flood"	Minjolli	Choi Hyeong Gyu, Lee Eun Chong and Teller Park	3:37	July 19, 2017	
During a big storm, water starts leaking into Ben's house due to a tunnel which his friends had dug before. Ben's friends arrive in time to save him and help restore his house and close the tunnel.
M40	"Angela the Detective"	Minjolli	Choi Hyeong Gyu, Lee Eun Chong and Teller Park	3:13	August 2, 2017	
After Angela finds that her poster has been doodled on, she investigates and comes to the conclusion that Tom was the culprit, because there was a marker in his bag. It is later revealed that Ben took revenge on Tom and Angela for accidentally breaking his robot by doodling on the poster, when Hank came by and did it for fun, after which Ginger also doodled and kept the marker in Tom's bag as he couldn't reach the pencil stand.
M41	"No time for friends"	Minjolli	Choi Hyeong Gyu, Lee Eun Chong and Teller Park	3:35	August 16, 2017	
While playing football, Tom leaves his friends under the pretext of going to work, but goes on a date with Angela. His friends find out and ignore him, so he agrees to play with them instead, and again goes on a date, which Hank and Ben crash, to their amusement.
M42	"Bzzz! Annoying Mosquito"	Minjolli	Choi Hyeong Gyu, Lee Eun Chong and Teller Park	3:15	August 30, 2017	
Tom and Hank try to kill a mosquito that is preventing them from sleeping in the middle of the night, and fail. Angela offers to deal with the mosquito using bug spray, and succeeds. Later, the mosquito recovers and flies away to trouble Ben.
M43	"Swimming Pool Challenge"	Minjolli	Choi Hyeong Gyu, Lee Eun Chong and Teller Park	3:30	September 13, 2017	
Tom and Angela compete against Ben and Hank in a series of swimming pool related matches, and are level after two rounds – Ben almost drowns after he tries to use a jetpack to cheat.
M44	"Hank Must Go"	Minjolli	Choi Hyeong Gyu, Lee Eun Chong and Teller Park	3:45	September 27, 2017	
While cleaning up, Hank accidentally makes a bigger mess, so Tom decides to kick him out, and Hank goes to live with Ben. Hank again makes a big mess and is kicked out, so Hank goes back to Tom, who is overjoyed on seeing Hank, whom he missed.
M45	"Angela on Mystery Island"	Minjolli	Choi Hyeong Gyu, Lee Eun Chong and Teller Park	3:27	October 11, 2017	
When the gang goes to the beach, Angela, who is asleep, drifts away on a pool float and ends up stranded on a deserted island when she wakes up – she uses a map in a bottle as an SOS, but the boys only see the other side which is a map to a treasure. When Tom and Hank fight about who should have the treasure, Angela finds them and is angered. After the treasure chest is opened, it reveals to be a pirate captain suit for a girl, much to Angela's delight and the boys' dismay – they all head back to the beach under Angela's command.
M46	"No Fun for Ginger"	Minjolli	Choi Hyeong Gyu, Lee Eun Chong and Teller Park	3:14	October 25, 2017	
Ginger wants to go to the beach even though he is sick, but Tom won't let him. Tom, Angela and Hank try to make him think it is autumn, which goes well, until Ben carelessly comes in wearing summer gear and accidentally reveals what the cats and Hank did. Ginger is upset and goes back to bed and Tom and Angela are furious at Ben, and choose to let Ginger have beach-like fun indoors.
M47	"The Skateboard Kid"	Minjolli	Choi Hyeong Gyu, Lee Eun Chong and Teller Park	3:40	November 8, 2017	
Hank teaches Tom skateboarding so that Tom can impress Angela. Tom becomes a professional and impresses Angela, who then becomes impressed by a passerby on a unicycle.
M48	"Lights! Camera! Action!"	Minjolli	Choi Hyeong Gyu, Lee Eun Chong and Teller Park	3:42	November 22, 2017	
Hank is making a movie and Ginger is upset that he doesn't get any acting parts. Ginger decides to sabotage the film and it seems to be successful, until, to his horror, Tom, Angela, Ben and Hank are revealed to have used props to deal with this. The movie is successful – but as a despondent Ginger leaves, he finds out that he was given credits for giving a use for props, much to his delight.
M49	"Tom the Bodyguard"	Minjolli	Choi Hyeong Gyu, Lee Eun Chong and Teller Park	3:12	December 6, 2017	
After a fortune teller predicts that Angela will get hurt, Tom does everything he can do to prevent it from happening. His attempt backfires when Tom accidentally pushes Angela while preventing her from falling into the sewer, causing the latter the break her arm.
M50	"A Gift for Angela"	Minjolli	Choi Hyeong Gyu, Lee Eun Chong and Teller Park	3:33	December 20, 2017	
Tom decides to knit a scarf and mittens for Angela with Hank and Ginger as a gift. Angela appreciates the gift, but hides the fact that one of the gloves has a hole.
M51	"Winter Championship"	Minjolli	Choi Hyeong Gyu, Lee Eun Chong and Teller Park	3:12	January 3, 2018	
The friends have a contest with Tom, Angela and Ginger in one team and Ben and Hank in the other. After a snowball-making contest and a ski jump match, both teams are even. Tom's team wins in the last contest, a race, when Ben and Hank crash into the snowball which was made by Tom's team in the beginning.
M52	"The Unlucky Gift"	Minjolli	Choi Hyeong Gyu, Lee Eun Chong and Teller Park	3:47	January 17, 2018	
Tom returns home with a present for Hank and hides it from him. Ben decides to prank Hank by pulling a "flour-in-a-box" prank on him as revenge for damaging his robot in a previous episode, and gives the present to Hank. Hank gives it to Angela, who gives it to Ginger, who gives it back to Ben in exchange for a lollipop and a toy. Ben puts his present under a table, and Tom also puts his present next to Ben's. Later, Tom gives his gift to Hank, which is shown to be firecrackers. Ben thinking that his prank has failed, opens the other gift and falls for his own prank.
M53	"Angela's Birthday Surprise"	Minjolli	Choi Hyeong Gyu, Lee Eun Chong and Teller Park	3:32	January 31, 2018	
Tom panics when he realises that it is Angela's birthday, so he calls Ben, Hank and Ginger for help and create a great surprise for Angela.
M54	"Lunar New Year Celebrations"	Minjolli	Choi Hyeong Gyu, Lee Eun Chong and Teller Park	3:48	February 14, 2018	
Tom, Angela, Ben and Ginger prepare for Lunar New Year, when Hank falls ill from sleeping outside in the snow. Angela offers to make food then, to the horror of the boys, knowing that her cooking is terrible. However, her food proves to be delicious this time.
M55	"Smartphone Diet"	Minjolli	Choi Hyeong Gyu, Lee Eun Chong and Jo Ayeong	4:00	March 14, 2018	
Angela's smartphone stops working, so Tom tries to keep her entertained until it is repaired. However, everything Tom does with Angela is done by others with smartphones. Soon, Angela then starts to enjoy board games, has a game night with the boys and gets over her smartphone addiction.
M56	"The Flying Machine"	Minjolli	Choi Hyeong Gyu, Lee Eun Chong and Jo Ayeong	3:24	March 28, 2018	
While jogging, Tom gets lost and comes across an abandoned contraption. He takes it home and tries to fix it, but fails. Ben fixes the helicopter-hot air balloon machine, and takes Tom and Hank out for a joyride. However, the trio crashes in a storm, and Ben and Hank evacuate. Tom accidentally presses a button while evacuating, and the machine flies away with Tom. Tom decides to control the machine, and guides it back home, but crashes into his own home.
M57	"Lost in the Forest"	Minjolli	Choi Hyeong Gyu, Lee Eun Chong and Jo Ayeong	3:20	April 25, 2018	
The gang goes on an adventure in the woods, however, Angela and Hank get separated from their friends after Hank falls into a pit. While lost, Angela makes a fire for Hank and Hank gives half of his food for Angela. Then Tom, Ben and Ginger find Angela's bag, which she lost while looking for firewood, and then see smoke from the campfire and find them. The four are able to get Hank out of the pit, but Ben accidentally drops his compass into the pit, much to Tom and Ginger's frustration.
M58	"Microwave MEGA-Problem"	Minjolli	Choi Hyeong Gyu, Lee Eun Chong and Jo Ayeong	3:35	May 9, 2018	
Hank microwaves some popcorn, when the microwave oven explodes. Hank takes it to Ben, who tries to repair it, but fails. Hank decides to sell some of his belongings so that he can afford to buy a new microwave, and purchases one. However, while returning home, Tom and Ginger run into Hank and he drops the microwave down the stairs, and Ben tries to repair it.
M59	"Hide and Seek"	Minjolli	Choi Hyeong Gyu, Lee Eun Chong and Jo Ayeong	3:29	June 6, 2018	
The friends play hide-and-seek, with Tom being the seeker. He finds everyone except Ginger, who manages to touch the tree before Tom sees him and wins. The friends play another match, and even though the friends choose less obvious places, Tom finds all of them except Ginger, who hid in a trash can. Meanwhile, Ginger is picked up by a garbage truck and returns in the evening, covered in garbage. The friends avoid him in disgust, and Ginger touches the tree, winning again.
M60	"The Magic Show"	Minjolli	Choi Hyeong Gyu, Lee Eun Chong and Jo Ayeong	4:06	July 4, 2018	
When Angela, Ginger and Hank ignore Ben, being preoccupied with their problems and activities, Ben and Tom decide to stage a magic show for their friends. The show is a success, and fills the friends with joy.
