= My Talking Tom Friends =

Mobile game

- Game icon for My Talking Tom Friends
- Developer: Outfit7 Limited
- Publisher: Outfit7 Limited
- Engine: Unity
- Platforms: iOS; Android
- Release: June 12, 2020
- Genres: Virtual pet, simulation game
- Mode: Single-player

My Talking Tom Friends is a free-to-play 2020 virtual pet simulation video game developed and published by Outfit7 for mobile devices. It is part of the Talking Tom & Friends franchise, and places the six main characters in an interactive "sandbox" household. The game was soft-launched in February 2020, before receiving a full release on Android and iOS on June 12, 2020. A version for the Amazon Appstore followed on April 20, 2021, and one for Android Automotive on May 5, 2023. The game has received generally favorable reviews from users and has been downloaded over 1,9 billion times. In 2024 the game received its sequel called My Talking Tom Friends 2.

== History ==
=== Development ===
Development of My Talking Tom Friends began with early gameplay and art concepts in mid-2018, followed by a formal concept phase later that year and roughly one year of production. The core team consisted of around 50 people, with additional contributions from across the company.

The game was shaped by iterative design insights from earlier titles in the Talking Tom & Friends franchise, particularly the improvements in character interaction and the more dynamic environments introduced in My Talking Tom 2. This helped establish systems for multi-character gameplay.

A major technical and design challenge was creating a unified behavior system for six characters that could act autonomously while still responding to player input. The final system used flexible parameter-based design tools to manage interactions and emergent behaviors.

=== Post-release ===
In 2024, the game was featured in the United Nations Environment Programme (UNEP) Green Game Jam. The "in-game activation" allowed players to earn organic fertiliser and garden seeds by cleaning up garbage around the house, which could then be used to grow vegetables in the game's garden.

In August, 2025, an ad-free version of My Talking Tom Friends+ was released on Apple Arcade. This version removed advertisements and in-app purchases in line with Apple Arcade's subscription-based model. Players can access mini-games, care for their pets, and explore.

== Gameplay ==
My Talking Tom Friends is a combination of a pet simulator game and a life simulation game. The characters Talking Tom, Talking Angela, Talking Hank, Talking Becca, Talking Ben, and Talking Ginger all live together in the same house. The player must take care of them by fulfilling their daily needs, such as feeding, washing, sleeping, and having fun. One way to have fun is to play a game from the collection of mini-games included. The player can also customize the characters’ outfits, as well as the furniture and decor of the house.

The in-game house features a backyard (with pool, tree house, and sandbox), a sleeping area, a living space, a dining area, a kitchen, a bathroom, and a front yard with a vegetable patch and a bus stop. Each area has various elements for the characters and player to interact with.

At any time, the characters can take a bus ride to the town, where the player selects one of a selection of themed locations for them to explore (a mall, a school, and a health center). Each location features various interactive elements and items that can be purchased using in-game gold coins.

Various other new or temporary features and activities are introduced in game updates and events, like the recent bus trip feature.

== Reception ==
Prior to launch, My Talking Tom Friends achieved 13 million pre-registrations. Upon its global release, it reached the top of the free Android and iOS charts in 40 countries within five days accumulating 22 million downloads in its first week and a 100 million whithin a month. According to Pocket Gamer, the game was among the most downloaded mobile games in July 2020. Total downloads have since exceeded 1,9 billion.

Kotaku called My Talking Tom Friends "a revolution in virtual pet simulation", while Gamezebo described it as "a mix of Big Brother and a Tamagotchi." In a preview, Pocket Gamer noted the game's expanded scope compared to its predecessors, focusing on character animations and the variety of available mini-games.

As of 2026, My Talking Tom Friends holds a user rating of approximately 4.4 out of 5 stars on Google Play and 4.4 out of 5 stars on the Apple App Store.
