= My Talking Angela 2 =

2021 virtual pet mobile game

- App icon of My Talking Angela 2
- Developer: Outfit7 Limited
- Publisher: Outfit7 Limited
- Engine: Unity
- Platforms: iOS; Android
- Release: July 13, 2021
- Genre: Virtual pet
- Mode: Single-player

My Talking Angela 2 is a casual free-to-play virtual pet mobile game developed and published by Outfit7 Limited as a sequel to My Talking Angela (2014), and part of the Talking Tom & Friends franchise. It is a mix between virtual pet game and simple life simulations. In addition to character maintenance, the title features customisation systems for fashion and interior design, as well as activities such as travel, music, and martial arts.

The game was soft-launched on Android and iOS in late March 2021, followed by a global release on July 13, 2021. By 2025, the game surpassed 300 million downloads worldwide and received the Industry's Choice Award at Green Game Jam 2023.

== Gameplay ==
The game features character Talking Angela, who lives in a big city. The player interacts with Talking Angela as a companion, assisting with daily routines and activities. Core gameplay features include:

- Nurturing and Care: Players manage Angela's four basic needs (hunger, hygiene, sleep, and fur neatness). This includes food preparation, bathing, and medical care for any injuries or sickness
- City Exploration: Gameplay is set across multiple urban locations. Main activities include baking and decorating treats in the "sweet shop", learning dance choreography in the "Dance studio", music production, and martial arts practice.
- Customisation and Fashion: The game features customisation options where players customise Angela's appearance through combinations of outfits, hairstyles, and makeup looks.
- Mini-Games: The title includes a variety of mini-games accessible via an in-game console, spanning multiple genres and difficulty levels.

== Reception ==
Following its launch, My Talking Angela 2 recorded 24 million downloads within its first two weeks, and by mid-2022, reached 300 million downloads. The game was one of the most downloaded games on Google Play in 15 countries.

Coverage of My Talking Angela 2 in mobile gaming and lifestyle media highlighted its focus on customisation and fashion-oriented gameplay. Publications such as Hello! Magazine and GamingonPhone noted the game's emphasis on self-expression and expanded lifestyle features compared to its predecessor.

The game received generally positive reviews, with critics noting that it is relatively safe for children to use. My Talking Angela 2 received the Industry's Choice Award and the Most Adoptable Award at the Green Game Jam 2023 for its in-game "Balcony Feature", which educates players on protecting bees and the environment. It was named the Best Family & Casual Game at the 2022 Huawei AppGallery Awards.

== Collaborations ==
Outfit7 and Miraculous Corp expanded their existing partnership by integrating characters from Miraculous: Tales of Ladybug & Cat Noir into the game My Talking Angela 2 for a limited-time event. During this campaign, the game recorded 1.5 million additional downloads and generated over 500,000 social media engagements.

Another brand collaboration ahead is with Mattel. As part of the collaboration, two Barbie characters will be integrated into the My Talking Angela 2 game through new in-game experiences built around fashion, creativity, and self-expression in spring 2026.

== My Talking Angela 2+ ==
In 2023, an enhanced version titled My Talking Angela 2+ was released exclusively on Apple Arcade. This version removed advertisements and in-app purchases in line with Apple Arcade's subscription-based model.
