= List of Talking Tom Shorts episodes =

Talking Tom Shorts is an ongoing web series distributed by Outfit7 and based on Talking Tom & Friends games and later series. Unlike the TV series, none of the characters have dialogue, and the show extensively uses slapstick comedy. There are 151 episodes, 3 seasons and 1 special episode as of February 2026, and are all released on YouTube.

== Series overview ==
Season	Game based on	Episodes		Originally released	
Season	Game based on	Episodes		First released	Last released
1	My Talking Tom	47		March 13, 2014	October 24, 2018
Pre-Season 2	My Talking Tom	9	2	October 22, 2015	December 5, 2018
Pre-Season 2	My Talking Tom 2	9	7	November 8, 2018	February 21, 2019
2	My Talking Tom 2	55	13	July 18, 2019	July 23, 2020
2	My Talking Tom Friends	55	42	August 20, 2020	July 23, 2023
3	My Talking Tom Friends	TBA		September 7, 2023	TBA
Special	My Talking Tom Friends	1		May 18, 2023	

== Episodes ==
=== Season 1 (2014–18) ===
No.	Title	Runtime	Release date	Ref.
S1	"Red Alert"	0:49	March 13, 2014	
Tom needs to use the toilet, but is unable to because the hand refuses to press a button, and taunts him.
S2	"Whack-A-Mouse"	0:58	March 27, 2014	
Tom tries to stop wind-up mice from stealing cheese, then takes a mallet to whack them.
S3	"Aerobics"	0:54	April 10, 2014	
Tom tries to train some cats in some aerobic exercises, but fails to get their attention.
S4	"Potions"	0:57	April 24, 2014	
Tom tries out some potions which were left unattended.
S5	"Lights Out"	0:51	May 8, 2014	
Tom and some other cats get annoyed by the hand playing with the lamp.
S6	"Round 1"	0:57	May 22, 2014	
Tom fights another version of himself by role-playing as different things.
S7	"Cans"	1:09	July 17, 2014	
The hand plays with Tom by trapping him in trashcans.
S8	"Flappy Tom"	1:04	August 1, 2014	
Tom attempts to fly between pipes like in the popular Flappy Bird game.
S9	"Hat Troubles"	1:05	August 14, 2014	
While driving a convertible, Tom keeps on losing his hats to the wind.
S10	"Be Serious"	1:12	August 28, 2014	
Tom tries to stay serious in a game where the hand catches the Tom which doesn't stay serious, but gets caught every time.
S11	"Makeover Madness"	1:03	September 11, 2014	
Tom's house gets a makeover while he is using it, much to his annoyance.
S12	"Who's the Boss?!"	1:29	November 13, 2014	
Talking Angela renovates Tom's house to her liking when she comes over to stay, much to Tom's annoyance. Note: This marks the debut of Talking Angela.
S13	"Cookie War"	1:31	February 26, 2015	
Tom and Angela fight each other while their cookies are being baked, then stop fighting to eat the cookies, then fight again over the last cookie. Note: This marks the addition of Talking Angela's background to the episode intro.
S14	"My Turn!"	1:39	March 26, 2015	
Tom and Angela fight to get the hand's attention and care.
S15	"Operation Opera"	1:48	June 11, 2015	
Angela takes Tom to an opera against his wishes, and Tom tries to pass the time by playing with his belongings but gets caught again and again. Then, Angela chooses to take Tom to a rock concert, much to his delight.
S16	"Bubble for Bubble"	1:38	August 6, 2015	
Tom and Angela play a video game in which they through balls at each other in a Mars-like world, and Tom loses. In a fit of fury, he starts to throw things Angela in real life.
S17	"Art of Packing"	1:12	August 27, 2015	
Angela & Tom pack up to go to the beach. Tom takes just one suitcase, while Angela, to Tom's chagrin, takes too many.
S18	"Attack of the Bookworm"	1:36	September 11, 2015	
At the beach, Tom tries to get his hands on one of Angela's books, and even attempts to dig a tunnel to get them. Meanwhile, a crab catches Angela's tail, and Tom and Angela confine themselves to a beach mat.
S19	"Super Suction"	1:31	November 12, 2015	
Tom uses a suction cup in his bathroom, but loses control of it, making everything in the room go inside it, include himself. When Angela releases Tom and everything that got sucked, she becomes mad at Tom for messing up the bathroom.
S20	"Hit the Road"	1:20	February 11, 2016	
Tom and Angela are travelling by car, with Tom at the wheel. While Angela does her makeup, Tom drives recklessly, much to her annoyance. In retaliation, Angela hits Tom with her makeup kit.
S21	"Helping Hand"	1:57	April 14, 2016	
Tom shows Angela that they both can get the hand to give them food but when they are chased by the hand which keeps on trying to feed them. Luckily for them, Talking Hank distracts the hand by using it to give himself food. Note: This marks the debut of Talking Hank.
S22	"Power Pirates"	1:40	May 26, 2016	
Tom and Angela battle each other as pirates, but get interrupted by a bomb sent by Hank, who is then zapped by a thunderstorm cloud controlled by Angela. Note: This marks the addition of Talking Hank's background to the episode intro.
S23	"Save Me!"	1:43	July 7, 2016	
Angela is having a fun time dancing alone at a party, and keeps on trying to get rid of Hank, who is repeatedly getting too close to her.
S24	"Wake Up"	1:49	August 25, 2016	
The hand tries to wake Angela up by many methods, but fails.
S25	"Sticky Jellies"	1:31	October 13, 2016	
Angela makes a cake for Tom, but makes a big mess and accidentally throws the cake out when trying to remove some sticky jellies that stuck to her.
S26	"What Should Angela Wear?"	2:06	November 10, 2016	
Angela tries to decide on what to wear for a date with Tom at a concert; in the end, Hank is sent wearing one of Angela's dresses instead.
S27	"Hank's Glasses"	2:03	December 21, 2016	
Hank tries to watch TV, but realises that it is too blurry. So, Hank tries different glasses but is unable to see the TV clearly. Tom and Angela arrive, and show that the TV screen was dirty.
S28	"Tangled in Space (Planet Hop)"	1:48	December 28, 2016	
Tom and Hank are on an unknown planet, when Tom sees a star, and wishes to give it to Angela. Hank tries to help him get the star, but ends up getting it himself and giving it to Angela.
S29	"Piano Battle"	1:18	February 9, 2017	
Tom and Hank compete in a piano-playing video game. However, Hank plays the game really well, while Tom makes too many mistakes and becomes furious at the game.
S30	"The Apple Up the Rock"	3:52	March 9, 2017	
Tom and Hank climb a hill to get an apple. However, when it falls on its own, they choose to jump down after it. Note: The total duration includes that of Episodes 19 and 25
S31	"Balloon Battle"	4:44	April 6, 2017	
Angela launches a surprise attack from a hot air balloon on Tom and Hank, so Tom and Hank retaliate and shoot down the balloon. Note: The total duration includes that of Episodes 15 and 27
S32	"The Last Cereal (Shopping Drift)"	3:04	May 4, 2017	
Tom and Angela go to the shop, but since it only has one cereal box on the shelves, they fight over the box. However, in the end the box is torn open and Hank is revealed to have obtained a trolley of cereal boxes, much to Tom and Angela's dismay. Note: The total duration includes that of Episodes 03 and 20
S33	"The Final Sticker"	4:25	May 25, 2017	
Angela is completing a sticker book, when Hank sets a pedestal fan to the highest setting, and gets Angela blown out through a window. Tom completes the sticker book for Angela, who is now in a cast, but sticks a last sticker upside down. Note: The total duration includes that of Episodes 13 and 24
S34	"Upside Down Prank"	3:52	July 7, 2017	
Tom tries to play a prank on Hank by making the living room look upside down by attaching all the furniture to the ceiling, but it backfires with Hank and Angela sitting upside down and behaving as if everything is normal. Note: The total duration includes that of Episodes 09 and 21
S35	"Unboxing Gifts"	4:14	July 26, 2017	
Tom, Angela, and Hank find gifts that fell out of the sky and use them to disturb each other. Then, the trio stops, and Tom gets hit by a boomerang which he threw first. Note: The total duration includes that of Episodes 12 and 26
S36	"Toilet Trouble"	3:10	September 7, 2017	
Hank unclogs his toilet by himself, while Tom and Angela explore the volcanic geysers near his home. Hank, who is unaware that the toilet is connected to the geysers, ends up sucking Tom and Angela through the toilet. Note: The total duration includes that of Episodes 04 and 29
S37	"Scary Movie"	4:00	October 26, 2017	
On Halloween, Tom and Hank watch a scary TV show, and Tom tries to hide the fact that he is scared by the movie. Tom goes to the kitchen, leaving Hank to watch the show, when a ghost appears and scares them, and is revealed to be Angela. However, as Angela laughs, she sees a real ghost through the window and screams. Note: The total duration includes that of Episodes 17 and 18
S38	"Monkey Business"	4:09	December 6, 2017	
Tom, Angela, and Hank go on an expedition to photograph a monkey. Tom and Angela struggle to get any pictures, while Hank succeeds by covering himself with sweets to attract monkeys. Note: The total duration includes that of Episodes 05 and 28
S39	"Tiger Attack"	3:36	January 10, 2018	
While roasting marshmallows at a campfire in a jungle with Angela and Hank, Tom gets scared of something stirring nearby. It is soon revealed to be a tiger, but just before it attacks Hank, it eats one of his marshmallows, only to get chased by him. Note: The total duration includes that of Episodes 08 and 22
S40	"Quiet, Please!"	2:06	February 28, 2018	
Angela wants to practice playing the ukulele, but Tom and Hank keep on making noise until it gets so bad Angela has to play on top of the tallest tree of the island, which fails since Tom and Hank jump up high and annoy her until she falls from the tree. Tom and Hank get worried if she is hurt, but then Angela plays the ukulele, prompting them to play the drum and maracas.
S41	"Stinky Dance Panic"	3:35	April 18, 2018	
Tom dances, when Angela arrives. However, finding that he smells, he goes to the bathroom to wash up, and after washing up, gets blown out of the window by a hair dryer, into a trash can. Note: The total duration includes that of Episodes 02 and 30
S42	"Pearl Thieves"	1:52	May 23, 2018	
Angela goes pearl hunting, but is unable to get a big pearl from a clam because the clam keeps on closing its mouth. Tom also tries to get the pearl, but to no avail. Hank succeeds by replacing the pearl with the coconut, and gives the pearl to Angela, when the clam arrives and chases the friends.
S43	"Football Freak"	10:37	June 27, 2018	
Tom is watching football on TV, when Hank comes and changes the channel. Tom takes the remote back, but Angela comes and changes the channel again, so Tom eats the remote so that no one can change it, but gets the hiccups, changing the channel every time he hiccups. Note: The total duration includes that of Episodes 03, 30, 09, 15, 32, 29, 35, 34 and 05
S44	"Super Birthday Cake!"	9:20	August 8, 2018	
Angela decides to prank Tom on his birthday by putting a self-lighting candle on his cake, but the prank backfires when Tom uses a fire extinguisher on the cake, and chases Angela when the cake hits her. Note: The total duration includes that of Episodes 25, 26, 09, 12, 10, 22 and 27
S45	"Hit the Road... Again!"	8:24	September 12, 2018	
Tom and Angela stop to replace a flat tyre, when the spare tire rolls down the road. Tom chases it and gets hurt repeatedly, but catches it. After the tyre is changed, the car rolls away, and Tom chases it. Note: The total duration includes that of Episodes 17, 20, 08, 40, 06, 13 and 16
S46	"Toilet Rescue Patrol"	9:34	October 10, 2018	
Tom tries to recover Angela's rubber duck from the toilet, but Hank interferes and gets Tom and himself sucked through it, damaging the toilet, while Angela chooses to take a different duck. Note: The total duration includes that of Episodes 19, 36, 01, 13, 21, 31 and 23
S47	"Haunted House"	9:20	October 24, 2018	
Tom and Angela go trick-or-treating, and enter a house which seems to be unoccupied, only to find a series of strange happenings, and escape when a monster-like hand touches them. It is revealed to be a prop that Hank had used to spook them. Hank helps himself to Tom and Angela's candy, when real monsters arrive and eat the candy. Note: The total duration includes that of Episodes 37, 04, 11, 39, 07, 33 and 24

=== Pre-season 2 episodes (2015; 2018–19) ===
Most of these episodes are released before the release of season 2, those ones were overall to promote Outfit7 Limited's new app, My Talking Tom 2. Talking Angela's Dance Show and The Cool Ride weren't promoting the app at all.

No. overall	No. in season	Title	Release date
48	TBA	"Talking Angela's Dance Show"	December 5, 2018
Tom and Hank set up a stage for Angela to perform, but things go wrong on Tom and Hank's side during the performance while Angela tries to make the best out of the situation, which ends with the truss collapsing. Angela runs to the curtains in embarrassment, returning when the audience applauds the performance.
49	S1 Part 5	"Snowball Fight"	December 19, 2018
Tom and Angela get into a snowball fight after Tom steals Angela's carrot to use as a nose for his snowman, when they notice that Tom's pet has fainted. Tom's pet then traps Tom and Angela under a blanket of snow, and steals their carrot.
50	S1 Part 8	"Bubble Fun"	January 24, 2019
Tom tries to take a bath, but loses grip on his soap, and it bounces all over the place.
51	S1 Part 3	"Crazy Smoothie Challenge"	February 21, 2019
Tom makes smoothies to save space in the fridge for a cake, then makes a smoothie out of the cake in frustration at the cake still not fitting in the fridge.
52	S1 Part 7	"Tricky Toys"	November 8, 2018
Tom tries to get a basketball from the top of a cupboard, and fails, so his pet pushes it down, only for the cupboard to tip over onto the ball.
53	S1 Part 4	"First Aid Emergency"	January 15, 2019
Tom gets hurt while trying to jump from the roof onto the trampoline, so his pet tries to give him medicine. Tom runs away and his pet traps him on the roof, when he falls off, onto the trampoline. However, this time he gets hurt when the trampoline propels him into a tree.
54	S1 Part 6	"Bathroom Buddy"	November 22, 2018
Tom tries keep his pet out of the bathroom while he uses the toilet, and even goes as far as boarding up the windows, but fails. He instead goes to Hank's island, but his pets still find him.
55	TBA	"The Cool Ride"	October 22, 2015
Angela rides on Tom's new jet ski, steering. However, things weren't meant to be, as the time on the jet ski goes out of control.

=== Season 2 (2019–23) ===
No.	Title	Runtime	Release date	Ref.
My Talking Tom 2
S1	"Master of Trash"	12:03	July 18, 2019	
Angela takes Tom's video-game controller and makes him clean up the house, but later screams at him for trashing the house with the vacuum cleaner. Tom then cleans the house, going as far as removing furniture, and even puts Squeak in the trash, and is forced to rescue it when the garbage bag rolls off, and then stop the bag from rolling over Hank. Angela gives Tom's video-game controller back to him, only to take it back when she notices that the garbage bag had strewn trash all over the road.
S2	"Tom's Yoga Fail"	8:53	August 22, 2019	
Tom tries yoga and gets hurt trying to impress Angela, so Angela gives him a bell to ring whenever he needs something. Tom uses it to his advantage, even after he recovers, only to get chased by Angela and Hank when they find that Tom was fooling them. Angela and Hank get hurt when they collide while chasing him, and make Tom cater to their needs as they had done for him, revealing in his absence that they aren't hurt. Extra episodes: Season 1, Episode 31; Season 1, Episode 32; Season 1, Episode 36; Season 1, Episode 21
S3	"Hide and Seek Challenge"	8:53	September 26, 2019	
The friends play hide and seek, but Tom gets caught every time. So Tom flies to another island instead of hiding, only to choose a quicksand spot to camp at. Flip notices him and flies to warn Tom's friends, and they find him having saved himself. The friends make Tom the seeker and fly away like Tom had done, while Tom carries on his work. Extra episodes: Season 2, Episode 01; Season 1, Episode 45; Season 1, Episode 42; Season 1, Episode 33
S4	"Scary Magic Show"	10:14	October 24, 2019	
Angela organises a makeshift magic show for her friends, but closes it, considering it a failure. After a mysterious person turns her toy magic wand into a real one, she accidentally casts a spell on herself, turning herself into an evil witch, and makes Tom's pets evil and chases and scares her friends. Tom accidentally throws candy at Squeak, and discovering that candy neutralises the magic, makes Angela return to normal and plugs the wand's end, only for Hank to unplug it and use the wand on himself. Extra episodes: Season 1, Episode 37; Season 1, Episode 21; Season 1, Episode 05; Season 1, Episode 47; Season 1, Episode 39
S5	"Super Strong"	10:41	November 21, 2019	
After Tom fails to do many physical activities properly unlike his friends and even his pets, he orders a headband that makes him stronger. However, when he spills water on it, he becomes a giant, and runs away in embarrassment, wreaking havoc while Angela tries to catch him, and escapes. Tom climbs a castle while Angela and Hank try to stop him in planes, when Angela falls out of her plane. Tom jumps down to save her, and Angela removes his headband, turning him back to normal. Extra episodes: Season 1, Episode 04; Season 2, Episode 02; Season 1, Episode 46; Season 1, Episode 23; Season 1, Episode 03
S6	"EXTREME Holiday Lights"	19:50	December 19, 2019	
Tom makes his friends rest while he decorates the house with festive lights, and uses too many lights. However, he gets tangled in the lights after trying to fix any burnt-out lights, and his friends try to pull him out, only for him to be launched into the air with the lights. Angela and Hank move a snowman away from where Tom will land, and when he lands, the snowman is launched into the air and lands on Tom, while the lights land perfectly on the house, only for one to burn out. Extra episodes: Season 2, Episode 02; Season 2, Episode 03; Season 2, Episode 05; Season 2, Episode 04
S7	"Angela's Broken Airplane"	10:17	January 30, 2020	
Tom accidentally scratches Angela's plane, and Angela makes Tom fix it. However, Tom and Hank make it worse and destroy the airplane, and then repair it. However, the plane catches fire and Tom accidentally starts it, and ends up crashing it. Later, Tom and Hank give back Angela's plane, and she starts it, only for the paint to be blown off and the plane is revealed to be Tom's, and Angela chases Tom and Hank. Extra episodes: Season 1, Episode 31; Season 1, Episode 20; Season 1, Episode 40; Season 1, Episode 25; Season 1, Episode 08; Season 1, Episode 29
S8	"Mega Music Party"	11:39	February 27, 2020	
Tom, Hank and Angela throw a music party, when Tom accidentally destroys the speakers. He orders giant speakers, but when a pet falls on the volume lever, the speakers start to blow everyone away. Tom manages to stop it, but accidentally turns it back on, and the friends get blown away. Struck by inspiration, Tom orders a giant jelly pudding to cover the speakers, and cleans up the mess they'd made, only for Hank to take a bite from the giant pudding and the speakers to start blowing him away. Extra episodes: Season 1, Episode 44; Season 1, Episode 23; Season 1, Episode 02; Season 1, Episode 24; Season 1, Episode 22; Season 1, Episode 12
S9	"Fleas, Fleas, Everywhere!"	10:40	April 9, 2020	
Tom discovers that Squeak has fleas, and tries to give it a bath without getting fleas himself, when the fleas take the form of a coat and attack Tom. Tom continues his search for his pet, and after his pet leaves him stuck in a vent, he goes in anger and catches his pet, only to get fleas. Tom runs to the bathroom, which is now full of water, and opens it, ridding himself and his pet of fleas in time for dinner with Angela and Hank, while the fleas ominously look through the window. Extra episodes: Season 1, Episode 41; Season 1, Episode 25; Season 1, Episode 14; Season 1, Episode 17; Season 1, Episode 10; Season 1, Episode 26
S10	"The Magic Berry"	12:48	April 30, 2020	
Tom and Angela take a walk through the forest with his pets, Squeak insists on eating berries. Tom sends it away, only for it to return, having eaten a magical berry. Tom and his friends try to take care of Squeak, which keeps on growing, and eventually, Tom goes inside Squeak and recovers the berry, only to throw it out and for a venus flytrap to eat it. Extra episodes: Season 2, Episode 07; Season 1, Episode 36; Season 2, Episode 02; Season 1, Episode 38
S11	"Chef Tom vs. Chef Hank"	12:10	May 25, 2020	
Tom invites Angela and Hank to his house for dinner, but they both leave when Tom shows up with terrible food. A dejected Tom finds Hank's cooking channel, and chooses to learn from it, but fails until the next morning, and makes a sandwich. Angela and Hank arrive with Hank's sandwich, and Tom and Hank compete to make their sandwich bigger, only to destroy both sandwiches in the oven. The two leave the kitchen, and find that Angela has ordered pizza and left one slice, and the two start to fight again. Extra episodes: Season 1, Episode 44; Season 2, Episode 01, Part 3; Season 2, Episode 08; Season 1, Episode 21; Season 1, Episode 13
S12	"Pets in Space"	15:34	July 9, 2020	
Tom's pets role-play as space explorers, when one of them loses its jetpack, which gets stuck on the chimney. They then recover it, acting as jungle explorers along the way, but end up activating it and crash into an asleep Tom, who first pretends to be angry, but then joins their game as a dragon. Extra episodes: Season 1, Episode 43; Season 2, Episode 09; Season 1, Episode 22; Season 1, Episode 09; Season 1, Episode 15; Season 2, Episode 10; Season 1, Episode 18
S13	"Invisible Tom"	11:04	July 23, 2020	
Tom experiments on Squeak with smoothies that can change the pet's colour, when he accidentally drops an eraser into a smoothie and makes it invisible. Tom then drinks it and turns invisible, and scares Angela and Hank into thinking that there is a ghost when they visit him. They then return in ghostbusting attire and chase Tom, and eventually, Angela catches Tom and tackles him only for her to realise that it is Tom when Squeak drops a bag of flour on him. They then make a purple smoothie for Tom, only for it to make him purple, to his annoyance. Extra episodes: Season 2, Episode 01, Part 08; Season 1, Episode 30; Season 1, Episode 32; Season 1, Episode 11; Season 1, Episode 16; Season 1, Episode 35; Season 1, Episode 34
My Talking Tom Friends
S14	"Treehouse Rescue Party"	9:47	August 20, 2020	
During a contest, Becca broke the treehouse ladder which makes Angela and Ginger left. Tom and the others went to the bus to get a new ladder. Meanwhile, Angela and Ginger decided to use the balloons to fly. However, they have to deflate their balloons and go back down. When the friends reached home with the ladder, Angela and Ginger fell on Tom. Extra episodes: Season 2, Episode 12; Season 2, Episode 10; Note: This marks the debut of Talking Ginger, Talking Ben and Talking Becca.
S15	"Breaking the Pool Rules"	9:46	October 1, 2020	
While Tom and his friends enjoyed at their swimming pool, Ben decided to make up the rules; since it is a problem to him involving with his friends. However, Ben gets angry and makes them when they break the rules. However, the friends trapped him in the locked house so they can play in the pool. Unfortunately, there was a thunderstorm. Luckily, Ben was able to escape with his key-shaped whistle and rescue his friends. When the storm ended, everybody fell into a stack. But when they fell, Ben got angry again. Extra episodes: Season 2, Episode 13; Season 2, Episode 09
S16	"Frightened Friends"	11:14	October 22, 2020	
While decorating the house for Halloween, Becca placed a picture of a spooky spirit; leading the friends trying to get rid of it. The picture becomes haunted and controls too many thing to wicked. The friends were trying to attack it, with Becca beaten it up in a trash can. However, Angela placed a rubber duck with a witch hat, but it turned wicked as well. Extra episodes: Season 2, Episode 04; Season 1, Episode 47; Season 1, Episode 37
S17	"Hank 'n' Roll"	13:03	November 27, 2020	
When Hank wants to ride on their tire swing, the rest keep swinging on it. When it was his turn, his friends want to go next, but Hank glued his butt to the swing. Since he's glued to the seat, he was stuck forever, and the rope broke off with him rolling over town. Tom tried to bring him back. When He got Hank with him unstuck to the seat, the others brought the bus. Unfortunately, Tom didn't come to the bus with the tire swing landed on him. Extra episodes: Season 2, Episode 07; Season 2, Episode 08; Season 2, Episode 09
S18	"Tom Lost Angela's Gift"	10:34	December 24, 2020	
When Tom and his friends go shopping and buy different things, Angela wants a lovely hat. Tom decided to surprise her. Without looking, Tom mistakenly got a plunger to her. He went to the convener belt to get the gift back which leads him to fell in the factory. When he finally got the gift, he landed outside and give the hat to Angela, while Ginger wear the plunger instead. Extra episodes: Season 2, Episode 06; Season 2, Episode 01, Part 5; Season 1, Episode 28; Season 1, Episode 35
S19	"Nasty Little Bugs"	9:59	February 25, 2021	
Tom and his friends were cleaning up the house, but Ginger wasn't. Instead, he used the bugs in the sand box to carry rubbish. Unfortunately, it leads them stealing furniture and other stuff. When Ginger and his friends were trying to stop them, with the bugs assembled into a furniture monster. The friends were not able to defeat them. Luckily, Ginger uses the loud guitar; that he used earlier. Ginger was able to defeat them with very loud music. In the end, the friends cleaned up the backyard. Extra episodes: Season 2, Episode 14; Season 2, Episode 02
S20	"Let's Ruin a Party!"	10:02	March 18, 2021	
While Tom and his friends were setting up a fancy party, Ginger and Becca mischievously play video games lazily ruining it. Any mischief deeds they did, the others keep stopping them, and boarded it all up. When Ginger and Becca are still ruining the party with the party items, the others lock them out the house. But they were able to enter through a window. The next thing they do is secretly eating the food. After that, they put a skateboard on Tom's ladder, causing him to fall with the collapsed jar stack. Luckily, Tom got saved by Ginger and Becca. In the end, everybody had some fun with them. Extra episodes: Season 2, Episode 05; Season 2, Episode 15
S21	"Football Boo-Boo"	13:13	April 22, 2021	
While the friends were playing football, Ginger's foot got badly injured by a rock. Since they only have 5 players, Ben decided to use their cleaning robot as a replacement. Ginger was not having fun. When it was a thunderstorm, the football robot got hit by lightning and gone out of control. The robot was chasing the ball everywhere destroying places in the house. Later, Ginger's friends were trapped in one toilet. Ginger defeated the robot by kicking the ball on the side of the net so it will be stuck. Everybody cheered for Ginger, that he got again while jumping. Extra episodes: Season 1, Episode 43; Season 2, Episode 05; Season 1, Episode 45; Season 1, Episode 03; Season 2, Episode 03
S22	"Aliens Took Our House!"	9:32	May 20, 2021	
Tom sees aliens in outer space with his telescope but the others were not able to. Tom decided to make a landing area. That night, the house loses gravity, hovered by the alien's UFO. Everybody discovered that they are at outer space. Ginger tries to press the off switch under their UFO, but he wasn't able to reach. When Becca used a football to kick it to the switch, it also didn't work. Luckily, Tom hung the lights and kick the ball that was able to turn off the hovering bottom. Unfortunately, everybody was falling down to Earth. Luckily, Tom uses his picture and lights to make a parachute. Soon, they're back at the ground safely. When Tom uses his telescope, the aliens can see that him, his friends and the house is at a deserted island. Extra episodes: Season 2, Episode 12; Season 1, Episode 42; Season 1, Episode 24
S23	"Water Balloon Battle"	12:55	July 1, 2021	
S24	"Home Repair Fails"	14:55	July 29, 2021	
S25	"Yawn Zombies!" "Sleepy Friends (YouTube Title)"	9:43	August 26, 2021	
S26	"Where's My Toilet?" "We Destroyed the Toilet! (YouTube Title)"	11:15	September 30, 2021	
S27	"Spooky Story Competition"	8:29	October 21, 2021	
S28	"Hank's Birthday Cake Mystery"	9:12	November 11, 2021	
S30	"Squeaky Clean Fun!"	9:12	November 25, 2021	
S30	"The Best Toy Ever"	9:46	December 9, 2021	
S31	"Don't Step in the Sand!"	10:49	December 23, 2021	
S32	"Rock Star Life"	9:40	January 27, 2022	
S33	"Sports Championship"	9:33	February 10, 2022	
S34	"Magic Show FAILS"	10:18	March 17, 2022	
S35	"Hank Can't See!"	3:29	March 31, 2022	
S36	"Garden Attack (Nasty Little Bugs 2)"	31:48	April 28, 2022	
S37	"Together Forever"	3:26	May 26, 2022	
S38	"We Shrunk Ourselves!"	3:30	June 23, 2022	
S39	"Tom's New Car (Hit the Road 3)"	3:33	July 21, 2022	
S40	"We Can't Sleep"	11:44	August 18, 2022	
S41	"Secret Treasure Hunt"	31:38	September 22, 2022	
S42	"Toy Train Adventure"	13:12	October 6, 2022	
S43	"Prank Hank"	15:53	October 20, 2022	
S44	"The Best Lemonade"	12:45	November 19, 2022	
S45	"Holidays at the Mall"	10:20	December 15, 2022	
S46	"The Lost Puzzle Piece"	3:33	January 19, 2023	
S47	"The Epic Race"	3:34	February 9, 2023	
S48	"Crazy Ball Machine!"	3:32	March 2, 2023	
S49	"Tom the Dancer"	3:28	March 23, 2023	
S50	"Backyard Camping"	3:30	April 13, 2023	
S51	"Gamers in Candy Universe"	3:32	May 4, 2023	
S52	"Angela's Talent Show"	3:33	June 8, 2023	
S53	"Pilot Hank"	28:21	June 29, 2023	
S54	"Flying Treehouse"	28:33	July 20, 2023	
S55	"The Cupcake Dream"	28:39	August 10, 2023	

=== Season 3 (2023) ===
No.	Title	Release date	Ref.
S1	"Garden Growing Potion"	September 7, 2023	
Angela uses her gardening formula to revive plants. However, she accidentally drip it all on the piano. The piano had powers to grow plants on its keyboard. Ginger thought it can grow objects too, but it makes the entire house infested with long plants. As Angela was stuck, she gave Ginger a potion that can shrink things, but Ginger accidentally shrunk the bus.
S2	"Tricky Traps for Roy!"	September 28, 2023	

=== Special (2023) ===
Title	Runtime	Release date	Ref.
"The Greatest Thief Ever"	6:30	May 18, 2023	
After Tom and his friends went to see the jetpack in the museum, which was closing, Roy plans to steal it. When Roy imagines what he'll use it for, he thought how he'll avoid the security. First, Roy sneaks out. Second, he goes up on top, and go through a vent. Thirdly, Roy uses his cheat goggles for the right code. Next, he accidentally pressed a button to turn off the lasers. Finally, he steals it. However, it turns out to be a toy jet pack. He decides to use it as a part of his chair, and plans to steal the golden duck.

== See also ==
- My Talking Tom
- Talking Friends
