= My Talking Tom Friends 2 =

Pet simulation video game

- App icon
- Developer: Outfit7 Limited
- Publisher: Outfit7 Limited
- Engine: Unity
- Platforms: iOS; Android
- Release: July 15, 2025
- Genre: Virtual pet
- Mode: Single-player

My Talking Tom Friends 2 is a 2025 virtual pet simulation video game developed and published by Outfit7 for mobile devices. It is the sequel to My Talking Tom Friends (2020) and part of the Talking Tom & Friends franchise. In addition to the “sandbox” household of the original game, the sequel expands the concept into an interactive neighborhood. The game was soft-launched in December 2024, before receiving a full release on Android and iOS on July 15, 2025. An ad-free version, titled My Talking Tom Friends 2+, followed on Apple Arcade in 2026. The game has received generally favorable reviews from users and has been downloaded over 50 million times.this game have 5 oacks and 2 festivals Halloween and Christmas

== Gameplay ==
My Talking Tom Friends 2 is a combination of a virtual pet simulator game and a life simulation game. It continues the gameplay of its predecessor; the characters Talking Tom, Talking Angela, Talking Hank, Talking Becca, Talking Ben, and Talking Ginger live together in the same environment. The player must take care of them by fulfilling their daily needs, such as feeding, washing, sleeping, and having fun. One way to have fun is to play a game from the collection of mini-games included. The player can also customize the characters’ outfits and homes. The original game’s gameplay is enhanced in the sequel through various new features.

Instead of sharing one large house, each character now has a house of their own in a neighborhood that also features various other locations, including a park, a health center, a supermarket, a clothes store, and a plant nursery. The characters can also all now speak, delivering voice-acted lines during gameplay.

As in the original game, players can take the characters on bus trips. But now, instead of taking them to shops where rewards are unlocked, the bus goes to completely separate interactive locations, such as the water park. The game has a complete day/night cycle, with the characters able to stay awake and active even after dark.

Various other new or temporary features and activities are introduced in game updates and events.

== Reception ==
My Talking Tom Friends 2 surpassed more than 6 million downloads in its first week of global release, and reached the number 1 game on Google Play charts in 31 countries. By 2026, the title had exceeded 50 million total downloads.

Coverage of My Talking Tom Friends 2 in mobile gaming media, in publications such as Pocket Gamer and Gamezebo, highlighted the increase in the game’s scope and size compared to the original, as well as the wide variety of things to do.

In 2025, the game was nominated for "Mobile Game Of The Year" at 2025 Gamingonphone Awards.

Industry analysts noted the game's improved animation fidelity and expanded interactive world, specifically praising the integration of family-safe, COPPA-compliant monetization alongside its progression system of mini-games and collectibles. Conversely, common criticisms centered on the frequency of advertisements, occasional technical bugs in ad-reward systems. As of 2026, My Talking Tom Friends 2 holds a user rating of approximately 4.4 out of 5 stars on Google Play and 4.2 out of 5 stars on the Apple App Store.
