= Talking Angela =

Chatterbot mobile game created by Outfit7

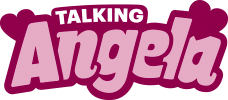
- Logo used from January 2014 to March 2021
- Developer: Outfit7
- Publisher: Outfit7
- Series: Talking Tom & Friends
- Platforms: iOS, Android, Windows (formerly)
- Release: iOS: 18 December 2012; Android: 11 January 2013; Windows: 1 August 2015
- Genre: Entertainment • Virtual pet • Chatbot
- Mode: Single-player

Talking Angela is a mobile game (formerly a chatbot), developed by Slovenian studio Outfit7 as part of the Talking Tom & Friends series. It was released on 13 November 2012 and December 2012 for iPhone, iPod and iPad, January 2013 for Android, and January 2014 for Google Play. The game's successor, the My Talking Angela game, was released in December 2014.

The game takes place in a café in Paris and allows players to interact with Angela, an anthropomorphic white cat in different ways. Players can use coins to purchase makeup, accessories and items, as well as drinks that will trigger different visual effects. The fortune cookie button causes Angela to read out a fortune cookie, while the bird icon will prompt birds to fly around the screen, or have Angela feed them. Players can also pet or poke Angela, as well the café's sign.

Prior to their removal, the game featured a chat system and a camera button. A hoax claiming that Angela's eyes were hidden cameras that enabled hackers or paedophiles to watch children was spread. Despite the claims, Snopes and The Guardian found no evidence. Due to the paedophile hoax, Angela received a blue dress, as well as an altered eye asset with a different reflection, and later the chat and camera functions were removed altogether.

== Hoaxes ==
In February 2014, Talking Angela was the subject of an Internet hoax alleging that sexual predators and hackers were asking children to disclose personal information about themselves, which is ostensibly then used by paedophiles to groom and kidnap these children. The rumour, which was widely circulated on Facebook and various websites claiming to be dedicated to parenting, claims that Angela, the game's main character, asked the user for private personal information using the game's text-chat feature. Other versions of the rumour even attributed the disappearance of a child to the game; one news report claimed that a seven year old boy disappeared after downloading the app. Another variation included that it was run by a paedophile ring. This was based on a claim that a man could be seen in Angela's eyes which experts noted was simply a case of pareidolia,a tendency where the human brain interprets random objects as faces. The app's developers, Outfit7, later gave a statement refuting the hoaxes.

The hoax was eventually debunked by Snopes, a fact-checking website. The site's owners, Barbara and David Mikkelson, reported that they had tried to "prompt" it to give responses asking for private information, but were unsuccessful, even when asking it explicitly sexual questions. While it is true that, in the game with child mode off, Angela does ask for the user's name, age and personal preferences to determine conversation topics, Outfit7 has said that this information is all "anonymized" and all personal information is removed from it. It is also impossible for a person to take control of what Angela says in the game, since the game is based on chatbot software. When the mode was turned on, the chat feature was disabled, meaning no personal questions could be asked.

In 2015, the hoax was revived on Facebook, which prompted online security company Sophos and The Guardian to debunk it again. Sophos employee Paul Ducklin wrote that the message being posted on Facebook promoting the hoax was "close to 600 rambling, repetitious words, despite claiming at the start that it didn't have words to describe the situation. It's ill-written, and borders on being illiterate and incomprehensible." Bruce Wilcox, one of the game's programmers, attributed the hoax's popularity to the fact that the chatbot program in Talking Angela aimed to sound realistic. Concern was raised that the game's child mode may have been too easy for children to turn off. It allowed them to purchase "coins", premium currency in the game, via iTunes, and enabled the chat feature. While not "connecting your children to paedophiles", this still raised concerns according to The Guardian.

=== Impact ===
The scare significantly boosted the game's popularity, and was credited with helping the app enter the top 10 free iPhone apps soon after the hoax became widely known in February 2015, and third most popular for all iPhone apps at the start of the following month. In 2016, Outfit7 removed the chat feature along with the camera function from the app due to this controversy, though this decision was met with criticism.

== See also ==
- Talking Tom & Friends
- My Talking Tom
