= Puppy Luv =

2006 video game

- Developers: Gogii Games (Windows); Blue Monkey Studios (Wii)
- Publishers: GameMill Publishing (PC); Activision (Wii)
- Platforms: Wii, Windows
- Release: 2006
- Genre: Virtual Life
- Mode: Single player

Puppy Luv is a simulation video game for the Wii and Microsoft Windows. The Wii version was developed by Blue Monkey Studios and published by Activision. It was developed and published for Microsoft Windows by a Canadian studio Gogii Games.

== Gameplay ==
Puppy Luv is a sim game designed for one player and revolving around caring for a puppy.

It contains:

- Six breeds: Dalmatian, Beagle, Golden Retriever, Labrador Retriever, German Shepherd, German Short-haired Pointer; unlockable: Boxer, Miniature Schnauzer
- Ten tricks
- Six competitions

The player chooses a puppy and then cares for it by feeding, grooming, and training it, which also earns the player money to buy things. The player is able to take their puppy for walks to allow it to relieve itself.

The player learns tricks to earn money in competitions.

== Reception ==
Lucas M. Thomas of IGN gave the Wii version of Puppy Luv a score of 3.5/10. He criticized the game for its lack of features in comparison to Nintendogs, its "frustrating" implementation of the Wii Remote controls, and the presentation of the game being over-reliant on cutscenes and canned animations.
