= Talking Friends =

Short series based on the app franchise of the same name

- Created by: Outfit7
- Based on: Talking Friends by Outfit7
- Directed by: Dylan Coburn
- Voices of: Michael Tauzin; Michael D. Cohen; Susannah Hillard
- Composer: Alfred Montejano
- Countries of origin: United States; Slovenia
- Original language: English
- No. of seasons: 1
- No. of episodes: 10

Production
- Executive producers: Ed Squair; Emily Barclay Ford
- Running time: 3 minutes
- Production companies: Disney Interactive Media Group (Note: Initially credited as Disney Online Originals via the trailer, however was eventually rebranded to Disney Interactive shortly before release.); Karactaz Animation

Original release
- Network: Disney.com; YouTube (Note: Uploads from 2012 through late 2019 on Disney's YouTube channel were set to private sometime around November 2024, and are therefore inaccessible. The episodes however, remain available on the Disney Video side of the disney.com website, and through YouTube reuploads.)
- Release: June 8 – August 31, 2012

Related
- Talking Tom & Friends; Talking Tom and Friends Minis; Talking Tom Shorts

Talking Friends is an animated mini-series that premiered on June 8, 2012 on Disney.com and YouTube. Based on the popular app franchise of the same name created by Outfit7 Limited, it is the first television installment in the Talking Tom & Friends franchise, and would be the only one to be produced in association with The Walt Disney Company. The series ended 2 months later, on August 31.

== Characters ==
- Talking Tom (voiced by Michael Tauzin), a gray tabby cat, newscaster, and Ginger's uncle who develops a crush on Angela.
- Talking Ben (voiced by Michael D. Cohen), a tan dog, genius, scientist and newscaster.
- Talking Pierre (voiced by Michael Tauzin), a green parrot who likes to play video games and gets easily annoyed by the others, particularly Tom.
- Talking Ginger (voiced by Michael Tauzin), a mischievous and curious orange tabby kitten and Tom's nephew.
- Talking Angela (voiced by Susannah Hillard), a white cat, singer and Tom's love interest.

Additionally, Talking Gina appears as a plush toy, but has no voice.

== Production ==
=== Development ===
According to The New York Times, various studios including DreamWorks Animation, 20th Century Fox (later acquired by Disney in 2019) and Nickelodeon had the chance to adapt the franchise in film or television before passing on the opportunity, until Disney Interactive took the offer.

=== Music ===
The show's soundtrack was composed by Alfred Montejano, while two additional songs were released by Walt Disney Records. The first, titled "You Get Me", was released on the iTunes Store on June 12, 2012 to promote Tom Loves Angela, and the second, titled "That's Falling in Love", was released to promote Talking Angela. The music video for "You Get Me" was produced by ARX Anima, Walt Disney Interactive Media Group. and Outfit7 and released on June 12, 2012, by Walt Disney Records. The scenes featured were originally produced for the music video and were not taken from any existing clips in the series. The music video was, however, was animated in the same style as the series. A teaser video for "That's Falling in Love" was also later released by Disney Music on December 6, 2012.

== Release ==
The series premiere and remaining episodes were released on Disney.com, as well as onto Disney's official YouTube channel, serving as their debut series on the platform. The series finale aired two months later on August 31, 2012.

=== Marketing ===
To help promote the series, Outfit7 created an app exclusive to iOS devices known as Talking Friends Cartoons that featured all ten episodes, as well as additional content including descriptions of the characters and downloadable wallpapers. The app, however, garnered controversy with some of the advertisements. For instance, a banner displayed at the bottom of the screen while the app was launched directed users to take part in quizzes that included prizes such as a 64GB iPad, which were unable to be completed unless users would spend monthly fees for a membership service. This resulted in many people feeling upset over the product as well as leaving many parents frustrated over the concerns.

A live performance event also took place in Hollywood that featured DJs from Radio Disney, plush toy giveaways and performers dressed and wearing makeup to portray the characters to promote the Talking Friends Superstars toyline.

== Episodes ==
No.	Title	Original release date
1	"Attack of the Tech!"	June 8, 2012
Tom and Ben's giant robot goes out of control and attacks cars and homes, so they try to stop it and eventually succeed.
2	"Foolf"	June 15, 2012
Ben gets inspiration of mixing golf and football together, only to become obsessed with it.
3	"Jet Pack Cat"	June 22, 2012
Ginger wants to ride Tom's jetpack but Tom tells him he's too young to try, so, Ginger tries to make Gina ride the jetpack, only to end up destroying it.
4	"Newserator"	June 29, 2012
Ben creates the Newserator 3000, but all it does is give news. Later, Tom and Ben decide to destroy the robot, but Pierre destroys it before them.
5	"Rock the Catsbah"	July 6, 2012
Angela's car breaks down on her way to a recording session at a studio. So, Ben makes a makeshift studio for her to record her new song, only for Tom to destroy it by cranking up the volume on the speakers.
6	"Shake that Tail"	August 3, 2012
Angela returns because she needs to have a music video for her new song. Meanwhile, Ginger wants to defy gravity, so Ben fulfils both their wishes.
7	"Multipli-Kitty"	August 10, 2012
Ben creates a mirror-like gadget that can duplicate anything. When Tom uses it to duplicate himself, Ben creates a device to reverse the duplication.
8	"Super Tom"	August 17, 2012
Ben creates a device that can give people superpowers, and uses it on his friends. However, when an armadillo accidentally touches the device, making him gigantic, the friends use their powers to stop it.
9	"Angry Parrots"	August 24, 2012
Pierre gets too obsessed with his game, and starts to think that his friends are zombies and attacks them.
10	"Tom After Tom"	August 31, 2012
When the friends debate about which decade is the best, Ben shows his new invention, a time elevator that allows them to go to any decade. In the end, they realize that the decade they're currently living in is the best.
