= My Talking Hank: Islands =

2024 virtual video game

- App icon
- Developer: Outfit7 Limited
- Publisher: Outfit7 Limited
- Series: Talking Tom & Friends
- Release: July 4, 2024
- Genres: Virtual pet; Open world
- Mode: Single-player

My Talking Hank: Islands is an open world virtual pet game developed and published by Outfit7 Limited. It was released on July 4, 2024. The game was launched on iOS and Android, and had a $20,000 giveaway at launch.

== Premise ==
The game allows the player to play as Hank, an anthropomorphic puppy, and can freely run around across a tropical island whilst accessing new features alongside wildlife. The game also lets you take care of Hank such as breeding, feeding and playing with him.

== Development ==
A series was launched on the Outfit7 YouTube channel which featured Hank showing tips on Survival in a forest. The series was produced by the Brazilian company Hype, and was a promotion for the game. A release date was announced in June 2024 for July 2024, and the game was launched on July 4, 2024 on iOS and Android devices. The game featured a $20,000 giveaway at launch to receive an exclusive in-game Dino outfit. The giveaway ran from July 4 to August 3. Product Manager of the game David Pokleka said the game would add a new update towards the end of the year.

An update was released in early 2025 which added a new minigame. The minigame made users clean the beach within the map. In March 2025, the game released an update which added an ice island and added new animals such as a Snow Leopard into the game. The game also added new clothing for the player to survive. On this update, the savannah island got removed from the map.

In the latest updates from 2026, the game is not getting new features

== Reception ==
The game received 10 Million downloads within the first week of launch. This was from immense support that Outfit7 had gotten whilst collaborating with influencers Ben Azelart and Topper Guild. Majority note that the game is mainly to be played with families rather than individually.

== See also ==
- My Talking Tom
- Talking Tom & Friends (TV Series)
