= Gogii Games =

Canadian video game developer

Coordinates: 46°05′20″N 64°46′37″W

- Type: Private
- Industry: Video games Computer software
- Founded: Moncton (2006)
- Headquarters: Moncton, New Brunswick, Canada
- Key people: George Donovan, President/CEO
- Website: www.gogiigames.com

Gogii Games is a Canadian video game developer and publisher headquartered in Moncton, New Brunswick, Canada.

== Games ==
The company makes primarily Hidden Object / Adventure games, targeted to adult females. Gogii's catalog of games consists of more than 30 games - including original franchises such as Escape the Museum and Princess Isabella: A Witch’s Curse, as well as licensed products based on Archie Comics and Shannon Tweed.

Their games are primarily developed for PC and Mac, and most have been ported to iOS, Android and other mobile platforms.

Games developed or published by Gogii Games include:

- Archie: Riverdale Rescue
- Shannon Tweed's Attack of the Groupies
- Fairy Tale Mysteries series
- Mirror Mysteries series
- Princess Isabella series
- Empress of the Deep series, (developed by Silverback Games)
- The Beast of Lycan Isle, (developed by Silverback Games)
- Infected: The Twin Vaccine
- Frat House: The Perfect Score
- White Haven Mysteries
- Haunted Past: Realm of Ghosts
- Voodoo Whisperer: A Curse of a Legend
- Nanny Mania series
- Robin's Quest: A Legend Born
- Secrets of the Dragon Wheel, developed by (Silverback Games)
- Escape the Museum series
- Mr. Jone's Graveyard Shift
- Adventure Chronicles
- "Dark Lore Mysteries: The Hunt for Truth"

== Awards ==
Princess Isabella was declared the 2009 Game of the Year by Big Fish Games, as well as being nominated in four categories at the 2nd Great Game Awards by GameHouse, where it won Top Adventure Game.
