= Silverback Productions =

Canadian video game developer

- Company type: Private
- Industry: Video games
- Founded: 2007
- Headquarters: Halifax, Canada
- Key people: Willie Stevenson, President; Colleen Shannahan, co-founder
- Website: www.silverbackgames.com

Silverback Productions (sometimes referred to as Silverback Games) is a Canadian video game developer founded in 2007 and headquartered in Halifax, Nova Scotia, Canada.

== Games ==
The company makes primarily adventure and puzzle games and have been released on Windows, Mac, iOS and Android, with distribution through Big Fish Games. Many of their games have been well-received on the Big Fish Games portal, as well as being Top 10 titles on the iOS App Store and on Google Play.

Games developed by Silverback Games include:

- Aurora: Puzzle Adventure
- Sons of Anarchy: The Prospect
- Empress of the Deep: The Darkest Secret
- Empress of the Deep 2: Song of the Blue Whale
- Empress of the Deep 3: Legacy of the Phoenix
- Secrets of the Dragon Wheel
- Theatre of the Absurd
- Beast of Lycan Isle
- Mr. Jones' Graveyard Shift

== Awards ==
Empress of the Deep was declared the 2011 Best Art and Character Design Winner at the 2011 International Great Game Awards by Gamehouse. Its sequel, Empress of the Deep 2: Song of the Blue Whale was awarded 2012 Best Art Direction in the 2012 Annual Gamers Guild Awards hosted by games portal iWin.
