= MOPy fish =

MOPy fish next to a rock and plant

The MOPy fish is a freeware cyberpet, released in October 1997 for Microsoft Windows by The Global Beach Group on behalf of Hewlett-Packard. It had been downloaded more than 10 million times as of the year 2000. Based on the blood parrot cichlid fish, the MOPy fish has a complex behavior pattern.

== History and Behavior ==
First released in 1997, the MOPy fish program was featured in the 2001 edition of the Guinness World Records as the most downloaded cyberpet. The MOPy fish can remember how it has been treated over the last week, and alters its behavior to correspond with the effort put into its care. It will, for example, become aggressive if not fed in five days, and may act depressed when starved for as many as ten days. If the MOPy fish is neglected and not fed for three weeks, it will fall sick and die. When the fish dies, all the MOPy points accumulated will be lost and the fish can only be brought back to life via a built-in menu. However, since MOPy fish is controlled by the operating system calendar, the fish can optionally also be brought back to life by manipulating the computer's date entry. Different versions of MOPy fish are still available for download at several websites.

== MOPy Points ==
For each original document the user sends to their printer, they earn MOPy (Multiple Original Printouts) points. The user can spend points on accessories for the fish's environment, making it happier and enhancing the appearance of the screensaver. The available accessories are as follows:

- 20 points: Baby fish
- 800 points: Rock and plant
- 1600 points: Bubbles
- 2400 points: Thermometer
- 3200 points: Aphrodisiac Fish Food

The Aphrodisiac Fish Food must be downloaded using a key that you automatically receive upon obtaining 3200 points. HP no longer offers this download, but it can still be retrieved from the website of Bill Greganti, who authored some add-ons and patches for the program. Greganti also offers a download of the original MOPy Fish program and a hack to accumulate points.

== Compatibility ==
Problems have been seen when running MOPy Fish on Windows XP and above, especially on 64-bit versions of the operating system, which do not support 16-bit software programs. On some 32-bit versions of Windows, "mopyfish" may not appear in the screen saver list, or will not start after the specified wait time. One known fix is to rename the mopyfish.scr file located in the Windows directory to SSmopyfish.scr. This works because some versions of Windows will only index screensaver files beginning with "SS".
