= Horse Isle (video game) =

2007 massively multiplayer online role-playing game

- The logo for Horse Isle 1
- Developers: Joe and Miranda Durbin
- Composer: Joe Schwebke
- Platform: Browser game
- Release: 2007
- Genre: MMORPG
- Mode: Single-player

Horse Isle is a browser-based massively multiplayer online role-playing game (MMORPG) first released in 2007. The game was developed and published independently by American duo Joe and Miranda Durbin. In May 2010, the second edition of the game, Horse Isle: Legend of the Esrohs was released, with gameplay and graphics differing significantly from the game's first release. This was followed by the released of Horse Isle 3: Infinite Wilds in August 2019, a downloadable three-dimensional edition of the game.

== Gameplay ==
Horse Isle is set in a fictional world wherein players can capture, take care of, train and breed horses. The game offers a number of different horse breeds, mini-games and arena competitions for players to take part in; many of the minigames feature educational elements, focusing on mathematics, science and problem-solving. The game also features a system wherein players can earn money to purchase their own horse ranch.

The game is completely browser-based. The artwork in the first two games is two-dimensional; in Horse Isle 3, the game is three-dimensional, allowing players to create avatars based on real-life appearances. The game also features parental language filters. In 2010, the game had a player base of around 10,000 players.

== Horse Isle 1: The Secret Land of Horses ==
Horse Isle 1: The Secret Land of Horses was created in 2006 by Joe Durbin, with the aim of creating a horse game geared towards young girls. The game went live on 3 May 2007, after extensive beta-testing undertaken by the Durbins and volunteers.

The main feature of the game included being able to catch wild horses, then train them to higher stats to win competitions which would reward the player with money or get them onto global leaderboards. Competitions were mini-games such as barrel racing, endurance, show-jumping, dressage, and the draft arena. Other mini-games not involving horses included sandcastle puzzles (found on beaches), horse anatomy quizzes, or jungle mazes which could award players with small bonuses for completion. Another large portion of the game focused on undertaking quests given by non-playable characters to earn money and quest points. The longer or more involved a quest was, the more quest points a player would receive. The different levels of quest point completion were 25%, 50%, 75% and 100%. Getting to each of these levels would allow players to visit unexplored isles and receive a large monetary bonus. These isles often had exclusive resources or horse breeds that were coveted (such as the pegasus which could fly, greatly reducing travel costs).

Players could also talk using the chat feature to chat socially, barter or trade for services or horses; either globally throughout the whole server or in private messages between friends. Quizzes and riddles were also posted regularly on the global chat server, with awards for fastest reply. Paid subscription players, with options for renewal at either monthly or yearly subscription lengths, could also own and build ranches which increased the number of horses they could have. (Free to play users capped at 7 horses). Subscribed players could purchase multiple ranches to maximize their inventory as well as use exclusive features such as wells and training pens to water and train all their horses simultaneously. Sometimes subscribed players would offer to "rent" spaces in their ranches, further training horses for other players in exchange for money.

In 2015, the game experienced a number of DDOS (distributed denial of service) attacks. In 2020, following the end of support for Adobe Flash Player in most browsers and its subsequent demise, Horse Isle 1 became the victim of a number of hacks, with the game's data became highly compromised and eventually unplayable, beginning in June and taking place periodically until October of that year, at which point the game was declared unsustainable and was labelled "end-of-life". Given a Flash workaround, the game is still available to play.

== Horse Isle 2: Legend of the Esrohs ==
Horse Isle 2: Legend of the Esrohs was released in 2010, with a single server supporting previous and migrating players of Horse Isle 1. Horse Isle 2 featured an enlarged version of the original map, introducing many new 'isles' and towns for players to visit. Several elements of the original game were retained, including the ability to find and catch wild horses, quests given by NPCs, mining for valuable gems, and puzzles and riddles scattered around the world for players to complete.

In addition to the basic NPC quests, the game also featured an overarching goal of players finding and completing the quests given by twelve "Esrohs", each of which took considerable time and effort. Some NPCs in the world gave players clues during the quests as to where and how to find the Esrohs, putting the onus on the players to put the clues together and discover them independently.

A second server was added in 2012, comprising an additional option of breeding horses. The original server was renamed "Eternal", with the second server being named "Life Cycle". This second server allowed players to breed their horses with the goal of improving stats for competitions; on the Eternal server, horses remained immortal, with no breeding options. Players were thus given the choice between gameplay with immortal horses, or gameplay including breeding horses which had a set lifespan.

Legend of the Esrohs was also a Flash-based game, which was slated to become non-viable at the end of 2020. As of October 2020, the game remains up and running, but is no longer updated.

== Horse Isle 3: Infinite Wilds ==
Following the news that Flash Player would no longer be supported by the end of 2020, the Durbins began looking into options for a third, non-Flash-based game, which would be three-dimensional, downloadable, and would not be reliant on Flash Player. Development began in 2018, with several rounds of beta testing taking place in early- to mid-2019, undertaken by staff and volunteer players from the first two games.

Horse Isle 3: Infinite Wilds went live in August 2019, featuring several notable changes from the first two games:

- Player avatars were now customisable, including the option to custom hair and eye colour, body shape and clothing options.
- There were no towns or 'isles' on a fixed map; the game's map was instead endless, and only showed areas that the player had explored.
- Players were able to create clubs for other players to join that became 'villages' on the map.
- Competitions became entirely player-created, with the ability to chop wood, build jumps and create obstacles, creating a wider range of competitions for players to take part in.
- Players were able to buy and build ranches on as many different plots of land as they wished, allowing them to build barns and water towers, amongst other features, in different places around the world.
- A second currency, named "mobia", was introduced, which could be purchased through the website using real money, or from other players in-game, with a higher premium placed on in-game mobia purchases. Mobia could be used to unlock the more valuable items in the game, such as equipment and ordered horses.

One notable difference between Horse Isle 3 and its older counterparts was the ability to access a large majority of the game without a subscription; in contrast to the previous two games, subscriptions only granted players useful, but relatively small perks, with much of the rest of the game accessible and playable without a subscription.

As of October 2020, the game had a player base of 3,458 players, many of which were players returning from Horse Isle 1 and Horse Isle 2, with some new players joining since its August 2019 launch. Horse Isle 3's moderatorship has been a matter of some contention, owing to allegations of unequal treatment of LGBTQ+ people and support of prison camp themed content.

== See also ==
- Sim horse game
