= My Talking Tom =

Virtual pet game by Outfit7

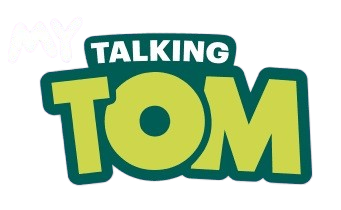
- The game logo used from 2014 until 2021
- Developer: Outfit7
- Publisher: Outfit7
- Series: Talking Tom & Friends
- Engine: Unity
- Platforms: Android, iOS, Amazon Kindle, Windows Phone, HarmonyOS
- Release: Android: 11 November 2013 iOS: 13 November 2013; HarmonyOS (for smart cars): 31 May 2022
- Genre: Virtual pet
- Mode: Single-player

My Talking Tom is a virtual pet game released by Slovenian studio Outfit7 on 11 November 2013. It is similar to Pou and the fourteenth game of the Talking Tom & Friends series overall. It was the first Outfit7 game to feature the smoother animation, and to feature Talking Tom's current design. A similar game called My Talking Angela was released on 3 December 2014, with its sequel released on 13 July 2021. Another similar game called My Talking Hank was released on 2 December 2016. A sequel, My Talking Tom 2, was released on 3 November 2018. Yet another similar game called My Talking Tom Friends was released on 11 June 2020. It was the first game to be released under the franchise's new name.

== Gameplay ==
The goal of the game is to take care of an anthropomorphic grey tabby cat named Tom who can optionally be renamed by the player. The player is invited to care for Tom and help him grow from a baby kitten to a full-grown tomcat by interacting with him in different ways, such as feeding him, taking him to the bathroom, playing mini games, and tucking him into his bed to sleep when he is tired. Tom can repeat words spoken into the device's microphone for up to 25 seconds using a synthesized voice. Through in-app purchases, in-game currency, or by logging into Facebook (Facebook features were removed in 2018 and before 2020 in older app versions), there is an option to visit Tom's friends (Removed In 2016), or travel around the world using in-game tickets. Using in-game currency, various different outfits, skins, and accessories can be purchased to dress-up and customize Tom. In-game currencies such as coins or diamonds can be earned through various ways including: mini games, a treasure chest, in-game TV ads or special logins. All in-game currency purchases including furniture, appliances, outfits, fur designs, eyes and shops are unlocked at specific levels when using coins, but they are purchasable in any level using diamonds.

== Age inappropriate advertising controversy ==
The game was reported for having advertised age-inappropriate advertisements for adult services. In 2015, the UK Advertising Standards Authority (ASA) ruled that advertising for an adult website was delivered to underage children via the game. The ASA noted that Outfit7 "had a strict advertising policy" but that the company "had not been able to identify which ad network had served an age-inappropriate ad on a children's app" and how the advertisements were shown in the app.

== Sequel ==
My Talking Tom 2
- Developer: Outfit7
- Publisher: Outfit7
- Series: Talking Tom & Friends
- Engine: Unity
- Platforms: Android, IOS, IpadOS, Amazon
- Release: 6 November 2018 (global launch)
- Genre: Virtual Pet
- Mode: Single-Player

My Talking Tom 2 is a sequel to My Talking Tom, it was released on 6 November 2018. The game has an identical objective to the original game, with newer additions such as a toybox, pets, and events featuring collaborations between Outfit7 and other entities.

== Gameplay and Features ==
My Talking Tom 2 is a virtual pet simulation game that retains the core mechanics of its predecessor while introducing updated 3D graphics and expanded interactive features. Players manage the protagonist's core needs, which are monitored via status meters for hunger, hygiene, energy, and bladder requirements. As a staple of the franchise, the character repeats user speech using a modified voice.

The sequel introduces several key differentiating features:

- Tom's Pets: The game introduces companion pets for Tom that have their own interactive elements for the player to engage with.
- Exploration and Travel: A travel mechanic allows players to fly a personal airplane to various themed islands to collect rewards and customization items.
- Mini-games and Activities: The title includes an expanded library of action and puzzle mini-games. Players can also teach the character specific skills, such as basketball or boxing.
- Customization: Players can customize the character's clothing and accessories, and redecorate the home with different thematic environments.

== Reception and commercial success ==
My Talking Tom 2 continued the commercial success of the franchise, becoming a popular download on mobile app stores shortly after release. The game contributed to the Talking Tom & Friends franchise collectively surpassing 26 billion downloads worldwide. Enhanced features, such as exploration mechanics and pets, were designed to increase user engagement and daily activity.

Between July 13 and August 13, 2023, the game hosted an in-game event to celebrate the 10th anniversary of the My Talking Tom sub-franchise. The celebration also included a collaboration with YouTuber MrBeast and reportedly drew participation from over 49 million users globally.

== Collaborations ==
In November 2014, Outfit7 partnered with the company Toyze in order to produce a series of 3D-printed toys based on the popular videogame.

In November 2024, Rovio Entertainment and Outfit7 launched a cross-franchise crossover event between the Angry Birds and Talking Tom & Friends series. Running from November 7 to November 28, the event featured integrated content across both mobile franchises. In My Talking Tom 2, players could access Angry Birds-themed mini-games and rewards through a dedicated portal. Concurrently, Angry Birds 2 hosted a "chilli-themed" event featuring Talking Tom. The partnership also included the release of two animated shorts depicting characters from both series teaming up against the franchises' antagonists.
