= Outfit7 =

Slovenian mobile game company

- Logo used since 2018 with 2021 version
- Type: Subsidiary
- Industry: Video games, web series distribution
- Founded: July 2009; 17 years ago in Ljubljana, Slovenia
- Founder: Samo Login; Iza Sia Login
- Headquarters: Limassol, Cyprus
- Area served: Worldwide
- Key people: Xinyu Qian (CEO); Samo Login (former CEO)
- Revenue: $130 million (annual, 2020)
- Number of employees: 400 (2020)
- Parent: Zhejiang Jinke Entertainment Culture Co., Ltd. (2017–present)
- Website: outfit7.com

Outfit7 is a Slovenian video game developer, best known for creating the Talking Tom & Friends app and media franchise. The company was founded by Samo and Iza Login and currently operates in 7 studios worldwide, almost exclusively focusing on mobile games related to the Talking Tom & Friends franchise. In January 2017, the company was acquired by United Luck Consortium and then sold to Zhejiang Jinke for over US$1 billion. The company also owns PlayValley, HyperDot Studios (now Outfit7 Neo), and Moving Eye.

== History ==
=== Outfit7 ===
Outfit7 was founded by Samo and Iza Sia Login, who had studied computer science in college and wanted to get into the mobile app business following the debut of the Apple App Store. In 2009, they invested $250,000 (€180,000) with six friends and set up an office in Ljubljana, Slovenia, where they developed some apps. Their first few attempts – a soccer app, a travel guide to Iceland and a "wealth affirmation app" were unsuccessful. After six months of attempts, Iza Sia and Samo developed a children's app called Talking Tom Cat, in which an animated cat named Tom would repeat in a "high-pitched helium squeak whatever is spoken into an iPhone's microphone" along with other reactions to feeding and petting.

=== Talking Tom & Friends ===
The Talking Tom & Friends franchise was created with the launch of the Talking Tom Cat app. It focused on anthropomorphic cats and dogs repeating things said to them by the user, before shifting focus to other apps such as endless-runner games and virtual pet games.

The franchise reached 300 million downloads nineteen months after its launch. The app franchise then went on to hit one billion downloads in June 2013. Talking Tom & Friends apps have been downloaded over 12 billion times as of April 2020, reaching 18 billion in March 2022.

As of 2025/2026, the Talking Tom & Friends franchise has accumulated more than 25 billion downloads across platforms. Earlier reports indicated that the series had surpassed 23 billion views and attracted 470 million monthly active users.

== Apps ==
Year	Title	Availability	Description
2010	Talking Tom Cat	check	Talking Tom Cat is Outfit7's first mobile app in the Talking Tom & Friends franchise, in which users can interact with the character Talking Tom, including voice repetition and simple touch-based animations. The app was an immediate hit, and as reported by Outfit7, surpassed 360 million downloads in 2 years. Since 2010, the company made two updates to the app, one for Talking Tom Cat's app 10th anniversary, and the last update was in 2025 as a result of a brand refresh. For this update, the app received a Mobile Game Update of the Year award at GamingOn Phone 2026 Awards.
2010	Talking Baby Hippo	Χ	Outfit7's second app in the franchise was Talking Baby Hippo, which featured a virtual hippo that repeats recorded speech and responds to user interaction. It was removed at the start of 2016.
2011	Talking Ben	check	The company's next attempt was a mobile app named Talking Ben the Dog that centres on the character Talking Ben and features voice imitation and animations. The character has been featured in numerous apps and in every web series.
2011	Talking Tom 2	check	In 2011, Outfit7 released Talking Tom 2 as a sequel to Talking Tom Cat. The app expands the interactive animations and voice-repetition mechanics established in the original.
2011	Talking Tom and Ben News	check	In the same year of 2011, the company released an app called Talking Tom & Ben News's that presents Talking Tom and Talking Ben as news anchors. Users can interact with the characters and record short segments using voice play and animation tools.
2011	Talking Pierre	check	Another app in 2011 that the company released was Talking Pierre, an app that features a parrot character that repeats speech and reacts to on-screen actions.
2012	Talking Ginger	check	The company released Talking Ginger in 2012, it introduces an orange kitten which players interact with while preparing it to bed. The character has been featured in numerous apps, and in every web series.
2012	Talking Angela	check	Talking Angela was released by the company in 2012 and introduces a white female cat that features animated responses and voice playback. The app spawned controversial safety concerns, but the allegations proved baseless.
2013	Talking Ginger 2	check	Outfit7 released a sequel to Talking Ginger in 2013. It allows the user to interact with Ginger at his birthday party. Until April 2014, the app was known as Ginger's Birthday.
2023	Talking Ben AI	Χ	The company released Talking Ben AI in 2023. It features Ben as a virtual assistant who responds to users' queries using AI. It was soft-launched in South Africa, Slovenia, and Cyprus on August 29, 2023, on Android. As of May 2025 the app is no longer available.

=== Games ===
Year	Title	Availability	Description
2013	My Talking Tom	check	The company's first virtual pet mobile game, My Talking Tom, was released on November 11, 2013. Players take care of Tom as he grows, and can rename and customise the character. The game was globally successful and received positive reviews. It became a top game in 135 countries on all platforms, with over 11 million downloads worldwide, and won a Tobby Award for Best iPad Game: Kids, Education & Family.
2014	My Talking Angela	check	The company's second mobile game is My Talking Angela, launched in November 2014. It is a fashion-focused virtual pet simulation where players adopt a kitten named Talking Angela and guide her as she grows into a stylish superstar.
2015	Talking Tom Jetski	Χ	In 2015 the company released its first endless runner game Talking Tom Jetski, where the user plays as Tom or Angela, riding on a jet ski to complete missions. As of October 2025, the app is no longer available.
2015	Talking Tom Bubble Shooter	Χ	The company released Talking Tom Bubble Shooter in 2015, a bubble-shooting game similar to Puzzle Bobble and Bubble Bobble. As of June 2021, the game is no longer available.
2016	Talking Tom Gold Run	check	In 2016, Outfit7 released its second endless runner game called Talking Tom Gold Run, where player can use Tom, Angela, Ben, Hank, Ginger or Becca, to chase Rakoon the robber while collecting gold bars.
2016	My Talking Hank	check	Outfit7 released My Talking Hank in 2016, a virtual pet game where players explore the island of Hawaii and its animals. In 2024, the company released a big update called My Talking Hank: Islands, another virtual pet simulation game where players take care of Hank, interact with the island's map and its animals. Reportedly, the update surpassed 10 million downloads in one week after release, and achieved the Top 10 charts on Google Play in more than 40 countries.
2017	Talking Angela Color Splash	Χ	In 2017, the company released the tile-matching game Talking Angela Color Splash. The game was later delisted.
2017	Talking Tom Camp	Χ	Outfit7 released Talking Tom Camp in 2017, their attempt at a strategy game, in which a player builds a camp while attacking enemy camps. As of June 2025, the app is no longer available.
2018	Talking Tom Jetski 2	Χ	In 2018, the company released a Talking Tom Jetski 2, a jet ski racing video-game. As of 2023, the game is no longer available.
2018	Talking Tom Candy Run	Χ	The company released a Talking Tom Candy Run in 2018, an endless runner game. As of November 2025, the game is no longer available.
2018	My Talking Tom 2	check	In November 2018, Outfit7 released My Talking Tom 2, a sequel to My Talking Tom. It is a virtual pet simulation game where players take care of Talking Tom as he grows up. In late 2025, a major content update introduced the "Plane Builder" mechanic and "Sky Race" mode, which added aircraft customization and competitive flight-based challenges to the core gameplay. To mark the 10th anniversary of Talking Tom, Outfit7 collaborated with MrBeast. This event featured an exclusive in-game outfit and included a charitable donation to the Tebow CURE Hospital in the Philippines to support surgical care for children. The following year, Outfit7 partnered with Rovio Entertainment for a crossover event between My Talking Tom 2 and Angry Birds 2 in a celebration of both properties' 15th anniversaries. According to Business of Apps, My Talking Tom 2 is one of the most popular games worldwide, and has generated over 900 million downloads across all platforms.
2019	Talking Tom Hero Dash	check	In 2019, Outfit7 released Talking Tom Hero Dash, an endless runner mobile game. The narrative features the franchise characters as superheroes tasked with defeating an invading army of raccoons. In 2025, Outfit7 collaborated with Miraculous Corp. for a limited-time crossover event featuring characters from Miraculous: Tales of Ladybug & Cat Noir in Talking Tom Hero Dash game. The partnership also included the release of an offline print-on-demand merchandise collection.
2020	My Talking Tom Friends	check	Outfit7 released My Talking Tom Friends in 2020, a sandbox-style virtual pet simulation. Unlike previous installments, the game allows players to manage six characters simultaneously within a shared 3D environment. The title saw significant commercial performance upon launch, recording 22 million downloads within its first six days and reaching 100 million downloads within one month of its global release.
2021	My Talking Angela 2	check	On July 13, 2021, Outfit7 released My Talking Angela 2. The game is a mix between virtual pet games and life simulators. The game offers customization options and activities ranging from travel to music to martial arts. By 2025, the game had surpassed 300 million downloads worldwide and received the Industry's Choice Award at Green Game Jam 2023. Outfit7 and Miraculous Corp expanded their existing partnership by integrating characters from Miraculous: Tales of Ladybug & Cat Noir into the game My Talking Angela 2 for a limited-time event. During this campaign, the game recorded 1.5 million additional downloads and generated over 500,000 social media engagements. In January 2026, Outfit7 announced a partnership with Mattel for a limited time Barbie event in My Talking Angela 2. The update came out on April 2, 2026.
2022	Talking Tom Time Rush	check	The company released Talking Tom Time Rush in 2022, which is an action-packed endless runner game featuring Talking Tom & Friends characters as they chase the Rakoonz across various realms.
2024	Talking Tom Blast Park	check	Outfit7 released Talking Tom Blast Park in 2020, and as of 2024, the game is available only on the Apple Arcade subscription service. The gameplay is a shooter-style adventure in which players control Talking Tom & Friends characters to retake a theme park from the Rakoonz, the game's antagonists.
2025	My Talking Tom Friends 2	check	On July 15, 2025, Outfit7 released a sequel called My Talking Tom Friends 2, a pet simulation game with an interactive neighborhood environment, where players can manage five characters simultaneously. In this sequel, Outfit7 introduced updated character designs and expanded gameplay content compared to its predecessor. The game reached 10 million downloads and reached the #1 spot in the games category on Google Play across 31 countries.
2025	Talking Tom & Friends World	check	On August 5, 2025, Outfit7 released Talking Tom & Friends World, a game inspired by Toca Life: World where the player can create stories using the characters and even record them on video. In August 2026, an update featuring the Smurfs was released.

== Corporate social responsibility ==
=== Environmental initiatives ===
Since 2023, Outfit7 has been a member of the Playing for the Planet Alliance, an initiative facilitated by the United Nations Environment Programme (UNEP). The company participates annually in the Green Game Jam, which challenges game developers to integrate ecological themes into their titles. In 2024, Outfit7's campaign focused on "re-using and recycling" within Talking Tom Gold Run and My Talking Tom Friends. The events reached an estimated 108 million daily active users across all participating Jam titles, encouraging players to adopt waste-reduction habits.

Earlier environmental efforts include a 2022 partnership with the non-profit One Tree Planted. During an Earth Day event in Talking Tom Gold Run, the company donated in-game revenue to reforestation projects, resulting in the planting of 50,000 trees. In Cyprus, company volunteers have participated in local urban greening projects in collaboration with Reforest Nicosia.

=== Community and education ===
The company manages a "Giving Back" program that focuses on infrastructure for children and digital education in Slovenia and Cyprus.

Since 2021, the company has conducted annual volunteer projects to renovate youth resorts. This includes long-term restoration work at the Debeli rtič Youth and Health Resort (operated by the Slovenian Red Cross) and the Tabor Mojca youth camp in Dolenjske Toplice.

Outfit7 is a partner in the "Girls Do Code" (Slovene: Dekleta programirajo) project, an initiative to encourage girls aged 9 to 14 to enter STEM fields. Organized by the social enterprise Simbioza and supported by the Slovenian Ministry of Digital Transformation, the project has reached over 1,500 students as of 2025.

The company hosts the "Outfit7 Talent Camp," an intensive training program for aspiring game developers and artists to gain industry experience.

=== Offices ===
Outfit7 operates offices in 4 cities in Europe and Asia. The company currently operates in London, Ljubljana, Limassol and Shanghai.

=== Acquisition and leadership change ===
In 2016, Samo and Iza Login hired Goldman Sachs to arrange for a deal to sell their company. On 20 January 2017, it was announced in a press release that Outfit7 was sold to United Luck Holdings Consortium, a China-based group, for US$1 billion. However, four days later, another press release indicated that United Luck would sell Outfit7 to a Chinese chemical company, Zhejiang Jinke Peroxide Company, which was renamed Zhejiang Jinke Entertainment Culture Co. Ltd after it had purchased a Chinese game developer. There was some confusion over who owned Outfit7, given that Jinke had disclosed plans to buy a 10% stake of United Luck. In March 2017, the agreement to sell Outfit7 to Jinke was signed. Samo Login remained on board as company director, and Iza Login remained as an advisor. In July 2018, Xinyu Qian became the CEO.

== Awards ==
=== Game awards ===
- GamingOnPhone Awards 2026: Talking Tom app won a Mobile Game Update of The Year award for the 2025 remaster update for its new visuals and features added in the app.
- Green Game Jam 2023: My Talking Angela 2 received both the Industry’s Choice Award and the Most Adoptable Award for its in-game environmental activations.
- Huawei AppGallery Editors' Choice Awards 2022: My Talking Angela 2 won the Best Family & Casual Game award.
- Tabby Awards 2014: Talking Tom & Friends titles received the Best iPad Game: Kids, Education & Family award, as well as the Best iPad Game: Kids, Education & Family and Best Android Game: Puzzle, Cards & Family categories.

=== Other awards and recognitions ===
- Mobile Game Developer Of The Year: Outfit7 wins this award at the GamingOn Phone award ceremony for its company's achievements in year 2025. They had three new game releases alongside other game updates and brand collaborations.
- Best PR/Marketing Team of the Year: At GamingOnPhone 2025 award ceremony, Outfit7 won the Award for the Best PR/Marketing team.
- YouTube Diamond Creator Award: Outfit7 received its third YouTube Diamond Creator Award for surpassing 10 million subscribers across multiple official channels.
- Guinness World Records Gaming Edition 2025: Talking Tom & Friends was featured in the 2025 edition of the Guinness World Records: Gaming Edition.
- Kragelj Competition: Outfit7's Slovenian subsidiary, Ekipa2, commissioned Kragelj for its office renovation project, which subsequently won the design competition.
- European Property Award: The Kragelj-designed office for Ekipa2 received a European Property Award, recognized for creating a modern and collaborative workspace that reflects Outfit7's brand identity.
- OpenAI Learning Impact Prize: Kobi, a reading app backed by Outfit7, received the award for its positive educational impact.
