= Talking Tom & Friends =

Mobile video game franchise

- Current logo (2021–present)
- Created by: Samo Login; Iza Login
- Original work: Video game series
- Owner: Outfit7 Limited
- Years: 2010–present

Films and television
- Animated series: See below

Games
- Video game: Video games

Talking Tom & Friends (Note: known as Talking Friends until early 2014, and Talking Tom and Friends until early 2021)(formerly known as Talking Friends) is a Slovenian video game series and multimedia franchise created and owned by Outfit7 Limited, a Slovenian video game developer. The franchise is best known for focusing on various mobile games involving anthropomorphic animal characters repeating things said by the user. The first app, Talking Tom Cat, was launched on June 26, 2010. As of June 2022, the apps have achieved more than 18 billion downloads. The franchise also includes various web series, which are mostly posted on YouTube.

== History ==
Former franchise logo, used from 2014 to 2021

Development for the original Talking Tom app began in October 2009 after Slovenian high school partners Samo and Iza Login, who studied computer science in college, decided to get into the business of apps. The two had saved $250,000 (approximately over €172,000 at that time) from working for local IT companies, and the Logins, who legally changed their surname to match their career, set up an office in Ljubljana alongside six of their friends. Their first few attempts to get into the mobile market were unsuccessful: a soccer app, a travel guide to Iceland, and a "wealth affirmation" tool that shared financial mantras.

After some more unsuccessful attempts, Samo Login, who was not interested in making games due to competition, came up with the idea to create an app based around a character. Samo Login purchased a $90 feral cat model named "CAT CARTOON" off of the 3D-model website TurboSquid, created and uploaded by 3D artist Andrey Kravchenko on January 31, 2004.

Samo personally renamed the model "Talking Tom", and handed the model, as well as that for the alleyway background named "Alley Corner with Graffiti", to his developers, who coded the animations and talkback feature, creating the app. Both were eventually removed in 2016, being replaced with original assets matching newer entries in the franchise.

== Characters ==
- Talking Tom (also called Tom) – A grey tabby cat and the title character of the franchise. Tom is a wisecracking, adventure-seeking cat, described as the "world's most popular cat". In his game, he is a fully animated interactive 3D character that users can tickle, poke and play with. Users can also get Tom to repeat what they say, but said in a higher-pitched voice. The original Talking Tom Cat app was launched in 2010 for iOS, followed by Talking Tom 2 in 2011. In 2013, the My Talking Tom game was released, followed by the My Talking Tom 2 game in 2018.
- Talking Angela (also called Angela) – Tom's girlfriend, a white cat with a love for travel, singing, fashion and dancing. Angela has also appeared in other games in Outfit7's flagship entertainment franchise, the more popular ones being Tom's Love Letters, Tom Loves Angela, Angela's Valentine, Talking Tom Gold Run, and Talking Tom Hero Dash.
- Talking Ginger (also called Ginger) – A mischievous ginger tabby kitten who likes to do pranks. In the Talking Friends web series, he is Tom's nephew. In the Talking Tom & Friends web series, he is Tom's neighbor.
- Benjamin "Talking Ben" (also called Ben) – A tan dog who is described in the Talking Ben game as "a grumpy dog and a chemistry professor". He enjoys inventing and doing things involving science and technology.
- Talking Hank (also called Hank) – A white dog with blue spots (one on his right eye, one on his tail tip, and the other on his rear). He was introduced in December 2014 with the premiere of the Talking Tom & Friends web series. His hobby is watching sitcoms, and he is Tom's roommate.
- Talking Becca (also called Becca) – A grey rabbit who was introduced in the Talking Tom & Friends TV series. Like Angela, she is an aspiring singer and also Angela's roommate.
- Talking Pierre (also called Pierre) - A green macaw who was formerly in the franchise.

== Games ==
=== Talking Tom ===
Talking Tom (officially named as Talking Tom Cat) is an app released on June 26, 2010, by Outfit7, in which the title character, Tom, repeats anything said to him in a high-pitched voice, and interacts with the user.

=== Talking Ben ===
Talking Ben (officially named as Talking Ben the Dog) is an app released in 2011 in which the user interacts with Ben. The character has been featured in numerous apps, and in every web series. It has also been made into many fan films such as "Ben Never Again", "Ben Never Again, Again", and "Ben Begins"

=== Talking Angela ===
Talking Angela is an app released in 2012 that was the target of a mudslinging campaign in which various individuals alleged that the app was created by paedophiles with the intent of tracking children, though no legitimate evidence was found proving the claims.

=== My Talking Tom ===
My Talking Tom is a virtual pet video game released on November 11, 2013, that allows the user to take care of Tom as he grows, and rename and customise him.

== Television ==
The franchise has created over 6 television shows, with 2 still ongoing.

Series	Season	Episodes		Originally released	
Series	Season	Episodes		First released	Last released
Talking Friends	1	10		June 8, 2012	August 31, 2012
Talking Tom Shorts	1	47		March 13, 2014	October 24, 2018
Talking Tom Shorts	2	55	13	July 18, 2019	July 23, 2020
Talking Tom Shorts	2	55	42	August 20, 2020	August 10, 2023
Talking Tom Shorts	3	TBA		September 7, 2023	TBA
Talking Tom Shorts	Special			May 18, 2023	
Talking Tom & Friends	Pilot			December 23, 2014	
Talking Tom & Friends	Minisodes	8		February 5, 2015	February 4, 2016
Talking Tom & Friends	1	51		April 30, 2015	December 22, 2016
Talking Tom & Friends	2	26		June 15, 2017	March 8, 2018
Talking Tom & Friends	3	26		May 12, 2018	December 27, 2018
Talking Tom & Friends	4	26		May 16, 2019	March 27, 2020
Talking Tom & Friends	5	26		May 8, 2020	December 24, 2021
Talking Tom & Friends Minis	1	60		March 3, 2016	July 4, 2018
Talking Tom Heroes	1	52		April 26, 2019	December 16, 2021
Talking Tom Heroes: Suddenly Super	1	52		January 14, 2025	TBA

== Other media ==
The Talking Tom & Friends franchise has expanded beyond apps and animated series. The franchise also sells branded merchandise and music videos.

Talking Tom and Talking Angela's music video for their single "You Get Me", created in cooperation with Walt Disney Records, has received over 350 million views on YouTube as of March 2020. Talking Angela has also recorded her first solo song called "That's Falling in Love". Talking Tom and Talking Angela's "Stand By Me", based on Ben E. King's song of the same name, received 54 million views as of March 2021.

Talking Tom & Friends launched a range of interactive toys called "Superstar" in 2012. The plush toys talk and interact with multiple Talking Tom & Friends apps, as well as with each other, using a voice recognition system. The series has since been discontinued.

A live-action animated feature film based on the Talking Tom & Friends franchise entered development in October 2014, with Brad Fischer, James Vanderbilt, and William Sherak producing the film. It will be produced by Mythology Entertainment. In October 2018, Jean-Julien Baronnet (who was also involved in the Rabbids Invasion television series and the Assassin's Creed film) was set to produce the film. As of late October 2019, the film is stated to be in the script stage, with the production team figuring out the plot.

== Reception ==
Upon release, Talking Tom Cat reached massive success. Within merely months, the app had gained millions of downloads. The popularity of the app reached the attention of TurboSquid themselves, who applauded Andrey Kravchenko for having his model be featured in the app. My Talking Tom had over 11 million downloads and was the top games app in 135 countries worldwide within 10 days of its launch. As of June 2022, the franchise has had its apps downloaded more than 18 billion times.

The Talking Tom & Friends YouTube channel has over 14.8 million subscribers and 6.1 billion views as of May 2022.

=== Accolades ===
The My Talking Tom app won the award for "Best iPad Game: Kids, Education & Family" at the 2014 Tabby Awards.

My Talking Tom was also voted the 2014 Tabby Award Users' Choice favorite in two categories, "Best iPad Game: Kids, Education & Family" and "Best Android Game: Puzzle, Cards & Family".

The Talking Tom & Friends television series won the Best Animated Series Award at the 2016 Cablefax Awards.

== Controversies ==
=== Paedophile hoax ===
In February 2014, Talking Angela was the subject of an Internet hoax claiming that it encourages children to disclose personal information about themselves, which is allegedly then used by paedophiles to identify the location of these children. The rumor, which was widely circulated on Facebook and various websites claiming to be dedicated to parenting, claims that Angela, the game's main character, asks the game's user for private personal information using the game's text-chat feature. Other versions of the rumor even claim that it is run by a paedophile ring, while some go so far as to even claim that the user is recorded by the camera and can be seen in Angela's eyes.

It was debunked by Snopes.com soon afterwards. The site's owners, Barbara and David Mikkelson, reported that they had tried to "prompt" it to give responses asking for private information but were unsuccessful, even when asking it explicitly sexual questions. While it is true that in the game with child mode off Angela does ask for the user's name, age and personal preferences to determine conversation topics, Outfit7 has said that this information is all "anonymized" and all personal information is removed from it. It is also impossible for a person to take control of what Angela says in the game, since the app is based on chat bot software.

The scare has significantly boosted the game's popularity, and is credited with helping the app make it into the top 10 free iPhone apps soon after the hoax became widely known in February 2014 and 3rd most popular for all iPhone apps at the start of the following month.

In 2015, the hoax was revived again on Facebook, prompting online security company Sophos and The Guardian to debunk it again. Sophos employee Paul Ducklin wrote on the company's blog that the message being posted on Facebook promoting the hoax was "close to 600 rambling, repetitious words, despite claiming at the start that it didn't have words to describe the situation. It's ill-written, and borders on being illiterate and incomprehensible." Bruce Wilcox, one of the game's programmers, has attributed the hoax's popularity to the fact that the chatbot program in Talking Angela is so realistic.

=== Child mode ===
Concerns have been raised that the "child mode" feature in Talking Angela may be too easy for children to turn off, which, if they did, would allow them to purchase "coins", which can be used as currency in the game, via iTunes. Disabling child mode also enables the chat feature, which, while not "connecting your children to paedophiles", still raises concerns as well, according to Stuart Dredge, a journalist from The Guardian.

=== Age-inappropriate advertising ===
In 2015, the My Talking Tom app was reported for having advertised age-inappropriate advertisements for adult services. The Advertising Standards Authority of the United Kingdom ruled that advertising for an adult web site was delivered to underage children via the app. The ASA noted that Outfit7 "had a strict advertising policy" but that the company "had not been able to identify which ad network had served an age-inappropriate ad on a children's app" and how the advertisements were shown in the app.

== See also ==
- Digital puppetry
- List of most downloaded Android applications
