= List of Talking Tom & Friends episodes =

Talking Tom & Friends is an animated children's web series created by Outfit7 Limited and based on the mobile video game franchise of the same name. The first three seasons of the show were produced by the Austrian animation studio ARX Anima, but starting with season 4 the show was produced by the Spanish animation studio People Moving Pixels.

The show was released on YouTube on 30 April 2015 and started airing on Boomerang UK on 5 September 2016, with the second season starting streaming on Netflix in the US in 2017. The fifth season is currently airing on Pop.

== Series overview ==
Season	Episodes	Originally released	
Season	Episodes	First released	Last released
Pilot		23 December 2014	
1	51	30 April 2015	22 December 2016
2	26	15 June 2017	8 March 2018
3	26	12 May 2018	27 December 2018
4	26	16 May 2019	27 March 2020
5	26	8 May 2020	24 December 2021
Minisodes	8	5 February 2015	4 February 2016

== Episodes ==
=== Pilot (2014) ===
Title	Directed by	Written by	Original release date
"The Audition"	Greg Manwaring	Tom Martin	23 December 2014
Tom wants to make an audition video to convince some TV show producers to give him and his friends their own reality show and so has himself and his friends introduce themselves. However Tom believes their video is unconvincing and tries to trick Santa Claus into making a video endorsing the friends. In response, Santa Claus suggests that Tom and the friends make their own show.

=== Season 1 (2015–16) ===
No. overall	No. in season	Title	Directed by	Written by	Original release date
1	1	"Untalking Tom"	Greg Manwaring	Jack Ferraiolo	30 April 2015
Tom and Ben plan to enter their Shockingly Secure Anti-theft app in the prestigious "So-You-Think-You-Can-App" app design contest, but when Tom accidentally electrocutes himself with the app he loses his voice. Dr. Internet Doctor recommends Tom not use his voice for a week. Ben tries to present their app by himself at the contest, but Tom decides his friendship with Ben is more important and joins Ben on stage. The CEO accidentally electrocutes himself with the app when trying to use it and a surprised Tom and Ben escape.
2	2	"Friendly Customer Service"	Stefan Fjeldmark and Udo Beissel	Guy Toubes	4 June 2015
After Tom releases the Talking Ben app prematurely there are so many angry customers that Ben cannot fix bugs and handle customer service. So he creates Gilbert, an answering machine robot. However, Ben programs Gilbert to not let anyone cut the call until they become his friends. Tom at first is impressed by Gilbert's responses, but when he and Ben try to leave to go to an amusement park with Angela, Gilbert wants to go too and traps and electrocutes them in the garage until they are friends. An angry Angela yells at Tom and Ben for trying to become friends with Gilbert, but she gets trapped with Tom and Ben and uses Gilbert's own logic to shut him down. After they do that, Ginger finds Gilbert and switches him on again.
3	3	"Future Tron"	Greg Manwaring	John N. Huss	21 May 2015
After seeing another garage-app duo similar to Tom and Ben they decided to meet them in person backstage. But that duo did not get along. Later, Tom and Ben invent a system app called the Future Tron 6000. However their brand new system messes up the gang's futures as to what happened three years later, as compared with the present day.
4	4	"Assertive App"	Udo Beissel	Guy Toubes	7 May 2015
While Tom, Ben, and Hank are filming a commercial for their "Sing Like a Pro" app – an invention they planned for Angela that converts regular voices into singing – the gardener interrupts with a leaf blower and then a jackhammer. Realising that Ginger is even more assertive than themselves the two invent a megaphone called the "Assertive App" which can command anyone who listens to it to do what the person says. However Ginger gets hold of the invention and misuses it to make Tom and Ben give him candy. Angela seems to be immune to commands made through the app and also capable of interfering it. She stops Ginger from causing more trouble, destroying the megaphone in the process.
5	5	"Magnetic Ben"	Greg Manwaring	Hugh Webber	18 June 2015
Tom and Ben plan to face Ginger and the gardener in a horseshoes event. However Ben receives an invitation from a university and decides to attend that instead of the finals. However he discovers he is not going to be a colleague but a test subject who will be exposed to high doses of EMF. When he returns he discovers he has become a magnet and ends up getting hit with a horseshoe he attracted, knocking him unconscious and knocking him and Tom out of the finals.
6	6	"Angela's Scarf"	Udo Beissel and Stefan Fjeldmark	Jim Martin	2 July 2015
Angela invites Tom to the "Scarf Spectacular Runway Neck-tacular" event where she is to be honoured as the Newcomer of the Year and wants to showcase her scarves. She tells Tom not to embarrass her. However Tom engages in small talk and starts promoting the idea of a scarf with unlimited design possibilities, attracting the attention of a fashion company executive named Autumn Summers, who revokes Angela's award and gives it to Tom. Tom apologises to Angela and tries to include her work in the presentation of the app. But when Autumn states that scarves are not for everyone Angela gets offended and withdraws the idea. Tom and his friends make a website and app for Angela and her scarves that garners a lot of orders, only to realise that they forgot to put a price on the scarves and will not get paid for them.
7	7	"Ben's High Score"	Udo Beissel	Karen Anderson	16 July 2015
Ben records a how-to video for a Flappy Bird-style video game called "Flappy Talking Tom" where he plans to give Hank tips while the latter plays. However Hank turns out to be quite capable at the game, even beating Ben's high score. Hank challenges Ben to a match called the "Barrage in the Garage". Ben becomes very stressed trying to beat Hank, who is very relaxed and eats a sandwich. Ben eventually collapses but wins the challenge, after which Ginger beats Ben's score.
8	8	"Strategic Hot Mess"	Greg Manwaring	Kevin Pedersen	30 July 2015
Angela has a concert at the park but the visitors do not care for her singing. But when Ginger posts photos of her getting upset and flipping a table she starts becoming popular on a gossip channel's "Hot New Celebrity List". Angela hires Ginger as her new image consultant and he sets up a fake date between Tom and Angela to film them dramatically breaking up. When that video helps her tops the list, Angela has second thoughts about whether her celebrity image is more important than her singing career, and chooses her career.
9	9	"Man on the Moon"	Greg Manwaring	Kevin Pedersen	13 August 2015
Tom and the gang go on an annual Camping Trip in the desert. Ben secretly brings his computer along and gets a love interest with the Moon on chat. Tom was upset because he wasn't with them.: Guest: Dannah Phirman as Ben's Mom, Moon
10	10	"Man on the Moon 2"	Greg Manwaring and Udo Beissel	Jim Martin and Hugh Webber	8 October 2015
After the camping trip from the previous episode, Ben arrived on the Moon to do love activities with it. Back on Earth work was very difficult without him, and Tom really missed Ben a lot.
11	11	"Hank the Millionaire"	Stefan Fjeldmark	Kevin Pedersen	15 October 2015
Hank has no money to buy a hamburger so Tom suggests that he use a crowdfunding website named Cashkicker. Hank makes a request for money to buy a hamburger and a promise to personally eat a hamburger with every funder. Hank's campaign ends up raising a million dollars while Ben's campaign for funding to make handheld holograms accessible to the public fails due to Ben's rudeness in his video. Hank spends all his money on hamburgers, running into trouble when he has to make good on his promise. After he starts hallucinating and becomes paranoid Tom gets an idea and has Ben create hamburger holograms for Hank to pretend to eat in a personalised video to each of his funders.
12	12	"App-y Halloween!"	Phillip Berg	James Woodham	22 October 2015
Tom and the gang have a Scare-a-thon TV Marathon but Ginger gets mad at the gang when they refuse to go trick-or-treating with him as they are adults. During the event Ben uses his Total TV Immersion App to make it seem like they are in the show. But when Ginger returns and starts capturing the gang by zapping them into his phone, Tom and his friends are forced to do what Ginger says.
13	13	"Big Ben"	Greg Manwaring	Allen Glazier	29 October 2015
After Ben's stand-up act tanks, Ben conducts research on how to make his act funnier. Concluding that being big will make him funnier, he uses his new invention the Gain-a-Tron to make himself morbidly obese. His new act is very successful but Tom and the gang are aware that the audience is just laughing at him because of his size and not his jokes. Ginger challenges Ben to read from a school yearbook and see the audience's reaction. Ben does so and realises that everyone is laughing at his size. Then Ginger arrives, morbidly obese because he had used the invention, and takes away Ben's popularity. Later, Ben decides to reverse his obesity, only to find out that Ginger had destroyed the invention while using it. He has Hank jump on him repeatedly instead.
14	14	"Think Hank"	Stefan Fjeldmark	Allen Glazier	5 November 2015
Ginger gets mad at Hank because he will not allow Ginger to watch the TV show he wants to watch,. So Ginger tricks Hank into thinking that Hank is an imaginary friend. Hank believes it when the rest of the gang also ignore Hank. However the prank later backfires on Ginger when he slips from the roof and is about to fall off, and Hank does not save him because he still thinks he is imaginary.: Angela's Songs: "Imaginary Friend"
15	15	"The Germinator"	Greg Manwaring	Marty Abbe-Schneider	12 November 2015
While working on an invention Ben tries to keep his work area clean, quarantining Hank to the bathroom because of a cold and using one of his inventions to find any germs that he has not gotten rid of. When he misses one he decides to enlarge it, but the gang finds the germ, named Jeremy, to be cute. Jeremy tells Ben that he intends to make everyone sick while pretending to be very sociable. Ben tries to convince his friends that Jeremy is evil. In the end Ben resorts to flushing Jeremy down the toilet, only for everyone else to start showing symptoms once Ben is done dealing with the germ.
16	16	"Hank the Director"	Greg Manwaring	James Woodham	19 November 2015
Every year for his birthday, Hank asks the gang to help him make a fan fiction episode of Bongo and McGillicuddy and this year they finally agree. Hank makes Tom and Ginger compete by auditioning for the lead role, selecting Tom and making Ginger his assistant. During filming, Hank becomes very irritated and rude directing the work. He eventually realises how mean he was, and apologises.
17	17	"Glove Phone"	Stefan Fjeldmark	Kevin Pedersen	26 November 2015
The gang waits in line for two days and three nights to get a "Glove Phone", only to be turned away at the last minute as the store is out of stock. After they learn that Ginger got one and will not share it no matter what Tom and Ben do for him, Tom tries to sneak into Ginger's house to take it, but realises that Ginger had set a trap for him. Ginger sarcastically claps for Tom while wearing the Glove Phone, only to end up damaging it beyond repair.
18	18	"Ping Pong Wizard"	Greg Manwaring	John N. Huss	3 December 2015
Three years before the series' events, the gang got a ping pong table. Ben became so obsessed with ping pong that he would not get back to work until someone could defeat him in a match. Tom and his friends solicit the help of their landlord, who happened to be a former ping pong champion, and he defeats Ben.: Angela's Songs "Ben the Ping Pong Wizard"
19	19	"Doc Hank"	Greg Manwaring	Allen Glazier	10 December 2015
While trying to watch his TV shows on his tablet computer, Hank accidentally clicks on a pop-up ad for Dr. Internet Doctor's Online Medical School, and ends up enrolling. He diagnoses Tom and the gang, but when Ben starts getting a series of symptoms, Hank thinks it is a serious condition. Ben convinces himself of the same and is prepared to undergo an operation by the amateur doctor, even though Tom and Angela are against it.
20	20	"Angela's Heckler"	Stefan Fjeldmark	John N. Huss	17 December 2015
When Angela is heckled during a Christmas performance, Ben pins it on Tom because he is the only one among them to have heckled at a Christmas performance. Angela also believes that Tom is the culprit, so Tom and Hank pretend to be British detectives to clear Tom's name. Looking for clues as to who might be the heckler, they discover that the culprit is Santa Claus, who heckled Angela because her song insulted reindeer.
21	21	"Blanket Fort"	Lee Stringer	Marty Abbe-Schneider	24 December 2015
Ginger and Hank are having fun role-playing as kings of a cardboard fort while Tom, Ben, and Angela mind their own business. But when they take over the kitchen and insult Ben who wants to go to the kitchen, Ben, Tom, and Angela role-play as enemies who attack the fort to get revenge, and succeed. Ginger and Hank pretend to have jetpacks, while Tom, Ben, and Angela take over the fort and start role-playing themselves.
22	22	"CEO in Trouble"	Stefan Fjeldmark	Jim Martin	31 December 2015
Tom has created an app that can guess a user's favourite smoothie, but it turns out to be very inaccurate. When he and his friends get a visit from the CEO Tom tells his friends not to pitch their ideas to him or try to get advantage of him. But he ends up doing just that after misinterpreting the CEO's receptionist's hold music, making the CEO his enemy. However the CEO forgives him on learning why Tom did the wrong thing and is given Hank's defective snowmobile to return to the office. He crashes because of the defect.
23	23	"The Perfect Roommate"	Stefan Fjeldmark	Kevin Pedersen	10 March 2016
The landlord tells Tom and his friends that they have to leave the garage for a week as there is a volcano underneath that is erupting. So Angela offers to house the guys. However Tom gets especially nervous about impressing Angela and acts weirdly. That night Tom surprises Angela repeatedly while she is working on a song, making her mad. The next morning Tom removes all the "girly stuff" and packs it up so that no one can break it. Ben tries to calm Tom down and take a box away, but the box falls and a miniature horse in it breaks. Tom tries to fix it with mud but an angry Angela calls a house meeting and says that Tom must find elsewhere to live. Tom leaves, dejected. That night Angela and Ginger get bored and confess that they miss Tom. They find him in the garage, surrounded by a lake of lava, and persuade him to return and stay with them.
24	24	"The Contest"	Greg Manwaring	James Woodham	17 March 2016
The gang gets ready for a video game match only for it to be cancelled due to a power outage. They panic as their phones are also dead because Hank had unplugged their chargers for his lava lamp. Checking the mail box for the first time in a while, Tom finds a letter containing a single ticket to the Floppy Disk Island resort. So Tom and his friends hold a competition to see who can last the longest without using any electronic devices. Hank is eliminated first as he considers the TV to be more important, followed by Ginger and Angela, and finally Ben is eliminated. However when Angela finds that Tom was using an earphone all along, Ben is declared the winner and he leaves with all his devices. Hank reads the letter and finds out that technology is not allowed on the island.
25	25	"Angela's Critic"	Stefan Fjeldmark	Erika Martin	24 March 2016
When Angela shows off her new song Tom pretends to have liked it so much that he keeps it as a ringtone for his phone. Angela accepts a visit from music critic Victoria Payne who is known to be harsh and very critical. The critic seems to be nice and surprised at Angela's kindness, but later publicises a scathing review of Angela's song and gives it a thumbs down. Angela is heartbroken and depressed, and ponders giving up her music career. But Tom and friends persuade her to write a song about it, which becomes a viral hit in itself.
26	26	"The Perfect Day"	Stefan Fjeldmark	James Woodham and Allen Glazier	31 March 2016
Ben has invented a virtual reality headgear device that allows the wearer to imagine their version of a perfect day. Tom tries out Ben's invention and soon finds himself as the successful inventor of a hat-locating app. He attracts the attention of the CEO and then some aliens. But when he refuses to sell his app to the invisible alien Tom soon has to defending against the invading aliens. He succeeds, but the device overheats and is damaged. When the rest of the gang wants to see what the device recorded as Tom's perfect day, Tom frantically gets rid of the memory storage device.
27	27	"Tom's Love Song"	Greg Manwaring	Kevin Pedersen	7 April 2016
Tom and his friends are writing song lyrics. Tom writes up some special lyrics about Angela but is too shy to share it with her. When Ginger entertains Tom with a magic trick Tom finds that Ginger swapped Tom's lyrics with his magic set's receipt as part of the trick. Tom tries to get the lyrics back from Ginger but Ginger refuses. Tom discovers that Hank was once a famous magician and tries to learn from him. In the end he resorts to using Ben's technology to trap Ginger and gets the lyrics back. He shows it to Angela, who thinks the lyrics are about Ben.
28	28	"Ghost Pirate Hunting"	Lee Stringer	Jim Martin	14 April 2016
Angry with Hank and Ginger pretending to be pirates and repeatedly restarting a download, Tom and Ben decided to scare Hank and Ginger by telling them a made-up story about Big Beard to stop them touching the computer. Since they believed the ghost pirate is real, Hank and Ginger decide to go on a hunt.
29	29	"Tennis Kid"	Greg Manwaring	John N. Huss	21 April 2016
When Hank takes a long time on his turn in his home improvement board game, Tom decides to help Ginger prepare for an eight-and-under tennis tournament. Angela thinks Tom is not taking the practice seriously while Tom believes that fun is more important. Ginger's opponent, a snobbish boy named Darren, comes and taunts him. Angela coaches Ginger to win while Tom coaches Ginger to have fun and enjoy himself. In the end, Ginger loses to Darren but Tom and Angela try to console him.
30	30	"Every Girl's Dream"	Stefan Fjeldmark	Erika Martin	28 April 2016
Angela becomes infatuated with a celebrity and movie star named Tanner Von Quads, so Tom orders a "perfect guy starter kit" from a website. However when Angela ignores him and gets excited over Tanner's appearance at the premiere of his newest film, Tom steps up his act and arrives at the premiere on a motorcycle. He confronts Von Quads, attempting to show off by doing stunts with the motorcycle, only to crash into a fire hydrant. Water sprays all over Von Quads, short circuiting him and revealing him to be a robot. The shocked crowd of women chase and beat up Tom. Later, Angela says that she understands that no one can be as perfect as Von Quads, and considers Tom to just be a perfect friend, to his dismay.
31	31	"Lost Friend Will Zee"	Stefan Fjeldmark	John N. Huss	5 May 2016
Tom's nerdy childhood friend Willie visits Tom. But Willie is now a cool skateboarder going by the name of Will Zee. Tom's friends take a liking to Will and Tom ends up not being the centre of attention any more. He first acts rude towards Will Zee, but in order to prove that he is also willing to do dangerous and cool things Tom catapults himself using a giant catapult and ends up in hospital, where he reconciles with Will Zee.
32	32	"Angela's Secret"	Greg Manwaring	James Woodham	12 May 2016
Hank tries adding narration to the episode as he, Tom, Ben, and Ginger wait for a sitcom-like crisis to happen. Angela requests the guys to house-sit at her apartment as she is going to give a concert elsewhere. While watching TV the guys learn about "The Banana Berry Bandit" who has been stealing fruit at the local stores. Finding fruit everywhere in Angela's kitchen leads them to believe that Angela is the criminal. When the postman arrives with a package, the gang ties him up as he says that he is a "federal agent". On returning, Angela explains she was making her own line of custom smoothie blenders, with the real Banana Berry Bandit revealed on TV to be a woman who became insane due to malnutrition from her excessive veganism.
33	33	"Jetpack Ninja"	Lee Stringer	John N. Huss	19 May 2016
Ginger disturbs Tom and Ben working on their jetpack invention while Angela works on a jetpack-related song. After watching a "Kid Ninja" episode and learning that Hank had trained as a ninja, Ginger gets Hank to teach him how to be a ninja. But when Tom and Ben pick Angela to test the jetpack, Ginger ignores his self-control and steals the jetpack, to the gang's dismay.
34	34	"Online Romance"	Greg Manwaring	Erika Martin	26 May 2016
For "Free Milkshake Day" the gang gets ready to go to the diner. However when the landlord shows up in the garage with a social media app where he gets hundreds of thousands of friends, Tom becomes obsessed with it and stays at the garage to take fake pictures of his adventures while the gang waits for him. Angela returns to the garage to get Tom, only for Tom's mind to be sucked into the app when Tom gets his millionth friend (as per the app's Terms and Conditions), leaving Angela with no choice but to get sucked into the app and get Tom back. By the time Tom returns the diner is closed and Free Milkshake Day is ruined.
35	35	"Friends Forever"	Lee Stringer	Marty Abbe-Schneider	2 June 2016
Angela gives Tom a friendship bracelet and warns him not to break it as that would imply that they are no longer friends. However in a game of hide-and-seek Tom gets his hand with the bracelet stuck in the couch and must ask his friends for help. But Hank and Ben are stuck in other rooms and Ginger stays quiet and ignores Tom as he wants to win the game. Tom is stuck with hallucinations of Angela, which tell him to cut the bracelet. Tom gives in and frees Ben and Hank.
36	36	"Daddy Ben"	Greg Manwaring	Kevin Pedersen	9 June 2016
Ben restores an old handheld computer named Boomerang which turns out to have a program simulating a child. Ben is torn between going out to the songs-and-lasers roller-skating night with Tom or staying home with the computer. The gang invite Angela to babysit, but Boomerang soon "upgrades" into a rebellious teenager and pushes past its hardware limitations, forcing Ben to upload him to the internet.
37	37	"The Famous Monster"	Phillip Berg	Kevin Pedersen	16 June 2016
Tom tries to support Angela for a commercial audition, but when Tom starts acting enthusiastically, he ends up getting the part. However when he later practices acting and gets a bunch of requests to do impressions from his friends, his face freezes up awkwardly and he is forced to wear a mask made by Ben to make expressions. While filming the mask is overloaded and destroyed and Tom's face is revealed. However, it turns out that the director likes Tom's expression, and his true face is used in the ad.
38	38	"Heatwave"	Phillip Berg	Jim Martin	23 June 2016
During a heat wave the landlord does not let Tom and his friends lower the thermostat, getting it password protected using the cloud. With Angela planning to go home and Hank hallucinating and talking to a watermelon, Ben uses a VR device to enter the cloud to hack the thermostat. Hank tells him the password, which turned out to be the answer to a question the watermelon gave Hank. But when the place gets too cold Ben's stubbornness to not do anything about it results in his friends getting frozen. Ben realises his mistake when Ginger compares him to the Landlord. Afterwards, the landlord comes and asks if the thermostat was touched. The friends leave for Ginger's house under the pretext of a pool party and the Landlord walks off, believing that the watermelon could not have possibly given the password, only for it to "think" in response to him.
39	39	"Germinator 2: Zombies"	Phillip Berg	Marty Abbe-Schneider	22 September 2016
In this sequel to The Germinator Ben gets infected by Jeremy the Germ, who returns from the toilet. Later, Ben transforms into a mindless zombie and spreads the infection far and wide through the town. Since the gang cannot get infected they devise a plan to cure everyone.
40	40	"Angela the Cheerleader"	Phillip Berg	Julia Cilli	29 September 2016
Tom and his friends support a basketball team called "the Barracudas". Ben shows his newest invention, a tortilla trimming machine which inadvertently goes out of control, when Angela comes by wearing a t-shirt supporting a rival team called "the Piranhas". Music critic Victoria Payne notices Angela's T-shirt and being a big Piranhas fan takes her to a fan party. She also gets Angela a gig to sing at the halftime show for the finals in which both the Barracudas and Piranhas will be playing, leaving Angela to choose between her friends and her career advancement. Angela decides to compromise by singing about a tie game, only to be heckled by all the audience. Realising that fans from both teams were united on one thing because of her, she watches Ben's tortilla trimming machine chase the crowd.
41	41	"Hank's New Job"	Lee Stringer	John N. Huss and Kevin Pedersen	6 October 2016
Ginger wants Hank to help him build a model rocket for a contest. During a break at the diner Hank tries out a dessert challenge where if the price of losing is $500. He loses and cannot afford to pay, so ends up being the diner's dishwasher. He has no time to help Ginger with the rocket and becomes more tired and irritable about everything. Tom and the gang try to help Hank get back to what is really important for him, and Hank quits the job to help Ginger.
42	42	"Parallel Universe"	Phillip Berg	James Woodham	13 October 2016
Ben goes on a trip and warns his friends against touching any of his stuff while he is away. Tom ignores his warning and touches one of his inventions, creating a wormhole that exchanges Tom with a doppelgänger wearing a bowtie and glasses. He discovers that he has been transported to a parallel universe where Ben is cool, Tom is a nerd like the original Ben, Ginger is well-behaved, Angela is a TV-loving couch potato, and Hank is a rising singer. Tom celebrates and has the time of his life. Meanwhile, in the original universe, Ben and the nerdy Tom develop a dislike for each other due to their similarities and create a plan to bring the original Tom back with the help of Angela, Ginger, and Hanks. They execute the plan and Angela sees Tom with the other Angela, making her angry. Ben throws the nerdy Tom into the wormhole and closes it, and Angela accuses Tom of being attached to the other Angela. Tom asks her if she likes him, but she tries to deflect the conversation.
43	43	"Love Formula"	Greg Manwaring	Matt Gossen and James Woodham	20 October 2016
After Ginger accidentally breaks Ben's phone during a "Basements and Banshees" trading card game Ben visits the tech store and falls in love with an employee named Xenon. Tom and Angela give conflicting advice to him on how to ask her out but Ben bumbles asking her out and leaves in a hurry. Ben attends a Basements and Banshees tournament where he meets Xenon again, and they play and eliminate every other player.
44	44	"Funny Robot Galileo"	Phillip Berg	John N. Huss	27 October 2016
Ben is invited to be a featured stand-up comedian at the CEO's birthday party. Concerned that this could ruin the company's reputation, Tom tells Ben to work on his comedic delivery and jokes. So Ben builds a robot named Galileo to help with comedic delivery. Galileo initially seems to be less funny than Ben but when some vinegar from a sandwich Hank made gets into Galileo's mouth he becomes funny. When the gang feed Galileo more vinegar he becomes rude and insulting. Tom and friends chase down Galileo to the CEO's party, only for Galileo to insult the CEO before Ben destroys him. However the CEO is not offended as he is tired of no-one criticising him, and has Ben run the comedy show. However Ben makes a joke about the CEO's pet goldfish which makes the CEO break down. Tom and Ben frantically escape.
45	45	"The Voice Switch"	Phillip Berg	Matt Gossen	3 November 2016
Ben's newest teleportation device accidentally makes Tom and Angela switch voices temporarily. Pretending to be Angela, Tom learns from her mom about a guy named Lance. Believing that Angela is in love with Lance, Tom investigates and finds that Lance is a talent promoter. He inadvertently makes Lance give Angela an audition for the same night. Meanwhile Ginger steals the device to get an adult voice from Hank or Ben so that he can order a rocket bike. Tom and Angela go to the audition and perform together so that no one notices whose voice is whose and get selected, only for Angela to talk in Tom's voice and freak the audience out. To make matters worse, when they get home they find that Hank and Ben had their voices swapped with Ginger.
46	46	"Poker Face"	Phillip Berg	James Woodham	10 November 2016
Tom and friends play a poker-like game called Noodlespoons, but the Landlord arrives to evict them for being too loud. Tom teaches the Landlord the Noodlespoons game, but when the Landlord suggests making real bets Tom wagers his business and loses. The Landlord becomes their boss and turns the company into a cleaning company. Later, Ginger challenges the Landlord to a game of Noodlespoons to win back the company.
47	47	"Museum Madness"	Greg Manwaring	Chris Karwowski	17 November 2016
Tom forces Ben to take a day off and they, Angela, and Hank go to the Fun Museum. But the museum turns out to be boring for everyone except Ben. Meanwhile Ginger declines joining them so he can sneak into the garage and goof around. He finds Ben's new hover-board but when he uses it he attracts the Landlord's attention and hides from him. Tom and his friends return from the museum to find the Landlord sneaking around in the garage.
48	48	"Embarrassing Memories"	Lee Stringer	Tom Martin	24 November 2016
Ben shows off his "Time Rewinder" invention which allows Tom and friends to revisit their past. However after being warned by some Bens from the future, Tom convinces Ben to travel back in time with him to prevent Tom from getting the idea of creating the invention. On the way, Ben writes on the bathroom mirror the point in time when Hank and Ginger were fighting a ghost in the 28th Episode.
49 50 51	49 50 51	"A Secret Worth Keeping"	Phillip Berg Stefan Fjeldmark Stefan Fjeldmark	Matt Gossen Tom Martin and Kevin Pedersen Boris Dolenc, Tom Martin	1 December 2016 15 December 2016 22 December 2016
• Part One: During Angela's birthday she and Ben are the only ones in the diner. She accidentally says out loud that she has a love interest with Tom. Meanwhile, Tom, Hank and Ginger are lost in an empty desert getting to the diner. • Part Two: Worrying about Ben keeping her secret, Angela meets up with him with a idea for a new invention related to memory. Meanwhile Tom goes to the CEO with Hank playing as Ben, since the real Ben is not answering. However they learn that they will be invited to the tech stars conference. • Part Three: Ben invents a mind-erasing device in order to forget about the secret. Hank is sent off to investigate Ben and Angela but gets distracted and watches television with them. Tom and Ginger attempt to spy at the apartment but Tom is heartbroken in a misunderstanding and becomes over-dramatic by attempting to sell their company.

=== Season 2 (2017–18) ===
No. overall	No. in season	Title	Directed by	Written by	Original release date
52	1	"Forgotten Kiss" (Part 1)	Greg Manwaring	Jim Hope	15 June 2017
Three months after the events of the previous episode everybody except Ginger had forgotten everything. They kept celebrating Angela's birthday, forgot to pay rent, and forgot a meeting with the CEO. However, he was the one who erased their memories.
53	2	"Extreme First Date" (Part 2)	Fernando Pomares	Jim Martin	22 June 2017
After the gang regain their memories, Tom and Angela are surprised that they kissed. They decide to go on a date for the first time. At the diner Angela waits impatiently for Tom whilst he is working on a romantic invention with Ben.: Angela's Songs: "First Date"
54	3	"Just Friends"(Part 3)	Eric Cazes	Kevin Pedersen	29 June 2017
The gang (except Ben) go out to the carnival for friendship activities. Ginger tells Tom and Angela to sit together on the Ferris Wheel so they can get embarrassed.
55 56	4 5	"Couples Clash"	Lee Stringer and Philipp Seis Eric Cazes	James Woodham Matt Gossen	13 July 2017 20 July 2017
• Part 1: Hank films the romance between Tom and Angela and the rivalry between Ben and Xenon. Ben burns his hands and Ginger has to act as Ben's hands. • Part 2: Tom and Angela versus Ben and Xenon compete in Couple Clash. Before the show Ben and Xenon cheat by changing the answers, causing Tom and Angela to break up after a short romance.
57	6	"The Backup Genius"	Lee Stringer	Jim Hope	27 July 2017
Ben chooses Darren from Tennis Kid to be his new assistant. Ginger gets angry because Darren was his rival. Later they learn Darren is the nephew of the CEO.
58	7	"The Cool and the Nerd"	Eric Cazes	Jim Hope	3 August 2017
A week after rejecting Ginger, Ben invents a hoverboard with Will Zee's signature as an apology to him. Ginger loves it.
59	8	"The Sabotage"(Part 1)	Fernando Pomares	Kevin Pedersen	10 August 2017
The CEO runs for mayor, with Tom mistakenly selling Angela's new song. The gang needs to sabotage the campaign and take back Angela's song.: Angela's Songs: "We Can Yes"
60	9	"Vote for Tom!"(Part 2)	Fernando Pomares	John N. Huss and Kevin Pedersen	17 August 2017
Ben helps Tom run for mayor by presenting a four-point strategy. When Tom starts trying it out it seems to work until the CEO steals the strategy. Entering the garage as a plumber, he begins to gain an advantage. Tom and the CEO appear at the "Mayor Factor" challenge where they compete against each other in a series of contests to win over the audience's votes. During the competition Ginger helps Tom cheat until Angela catches them out and gets mad at Tom. Tom admits to everyone that he cheated and that he would rather be honest and have his friends than run for mayor. His apology wins the crowd over for his integrity, and he is elected mayor. The CEO also admits that he had cheated and made up lies about Tom and paid for robots to vote for him, but is subsequently ridiculed for it and loses all his votes.
61	10	"Happy Town"(Part 3)	Fernando Pomares	Kevin Pedersen	5 October 2017
Newly elected mayor Tom makes ensuring everyone is happy his first job as mayor, while Ben suggests fixing the civic infrastructure. Tom tries having a booth where he fields complaints but that only serves to annoy passers-by. Later he realises that people become happy when they are having a party so he organises a town party. But when this leaves a huge mess he cancels the party and creates a clean-up party, reverting the damage.
62	11	"The Nerd Club"	Lee Stringer and Philipp Seis	Jim Hope	12 October 2017
While practicing a dance routine for the Mayor's float for the Founder's Day parade Tom injures his knee. Ben has invented a "Brainerator", a device that converts simple talk to intellectual talk so that he can understand what Tom means to say. He has had enough of the gang's silly antics and, under the advice of Xenon, joins a secret intellectual society called the S.M.A.R.T.I.E.S (The Super Mentally Advanced Really Truly Intellectually Endowed Society), easily passing their initiation. But when he brings the S.M.A.R.T.I.E.S to the garage, the S.M.A.R.T.I.E.S make fun of Ben's friends due to their being average in terms of intellect, which eventually upsets Ben. He sabotages their "No-Brainerator", which the S.M.A.R.T.I.E.S had made so that they could make fun of his friends. He quits the S.M.A.R.T.I.E.S and then reconciles with Tom at the Founder's Day Parade.
63	12	"Taco Spaghetti Burger"	Fernando Pomares	Matt Gossen	19 October 2017
Ben wants Tom to make a promotional video for his "Bathroom Buddy" app, but Tom and the others become interested in Hank's new food item, the Taco Spaghetti Burger (T.S.B.). A passerby finds it delicious, and soon the gang converts the garage into a restaurant. Ben gets upset and parts ways with Tom, recruiting Rhonda to promote the app. When the T.S.B. wanes in novelty, Tom and the gang start suggesting other ingredients for Hank to mix up, and they continue to have success until Ginger takes literally what Tom said about people drinking toilet water if they thought it was cool. The patrons get sick and start vomiting all over the garage. Tom rushes to the diner to apologise to Ben. Afterwards, the patrons visit the diner to use the bathroom although many do not make it to the stalls, much to Rhonda's dismay.
64	13	"Double Date Disaster"	Fernando Pomares	Kevin Pedersen	26 October 2017
Tom and Angela have a double date scavenger hunt adventure with Ben and Xenon (via tablet webcam) and make a stop at the diner. But a storm hits town and blows a tree in front of the door, trapping them inside. They try to keep themselves entertained but Ginger warns them that a monster is nearby. The gang tries to contact Hank to bring a robot from the garage to cut down the tree, but freaks out when they lose reception. When the diner is hit by a power outage the rest of the customers follow Ginger and tie up Tom and Angela for not following Ginger. A robot which was controlled by Xenon arrives, with Xenon explaining all the strange events.
65	14	"Email Fail"	Fernando Pomares	Kevin Pederson	2 November 2017
Tom and Ben finish their business plan documents. But Tom mistakenly sends the document to the CEO. Ben creates a device that teleports him and Tom into the Internet to chase down the email, with Ginger helping them navigate. Meanwhile Hank and Angela try to distract the CEO from opening his email. In the end Tom and Ben succeed by infecting the CEO's phone with computer viruses.
66	15	"Babysitter Tom"	Eric Cazes	Jim Hope	9 November 2017
The gang wants to go to a demolition derby but Ginger's babysitter has hidden the tickets. Tom offers to become the babysitter, but realises Ginger's carefree activity puts him in a lot of danger. So he puts Ginger in a person-size hamster ball. The gang gets upset that Tom is becoming overprotective and are forced to trap Tom in the ball.
67	16	"Garage Feast Day"	Eric Cazes	Kevin Pedersen	16 November 2017
The gang celebrate their annual garage feast day, which consists of gathering food which has gone past or is near the expiration date. Ben invites his computer son Boomerang, who brings his girlfriend, a dot matrix printer named Dot. Boomerang talks about how he and Dot have developed artwork on display at a local museum. But Ben is concerned he is wasting his time and almost ruins his relation with Boomerang.
68	17	"Back to School"	Fernando Pomares	Jayne Hamil	23 November 2017
Ben is looking for his new invention, the Miracle Slurper, when Ginger informs them that it has been confiscated by his teacher. Tom and Angela dress up as Ginger's parents, but at the school Tom finds out that Ginger's teacher was also Tom's former teacher Ms. Vanthrax. Ms. Vanthrax sees through Tom's and Angela's disguises and gives them all detention, leaving Ben with only one option: to sneak into the school and get Tom, Angela and Ginger. Ben succeeds, but chooses to let Ms. Vanthrax keep Tom in detention for giving the invention to Ginger.
69	18	"The Love Ride"	Lee Stringer and Philipp Seis	Karen Anderson	30 November 2017
Xenon tells Ben that she will be in town but when Ben learns Xenon went on a drive with her coworker Albert he insists on driving her around as well. After restoring an old taxicab that was lying in front of the garage Ben reveals to Tom that he does not know how to drive. But he realises he can make a remote control to drive the car. The driving date goes well until Ginger, Hank, and Angela unknowingly use the remote to try to operate Ginger's RC car, which almost gets ruined.
70	19	"Bye, Bye, Bongo!"	Lee Stringer and Philipp Seis	James Woodham	7 December 2017
When Hank learns that his favorite show Bongo & McGillicuddy is ending he uses Ben's invention to enter the TV world to convince the two not to retire. While there he learns that Bongo and McGillicuddy see the world Hank lives in as a television show as well. With Ben's invention broken and with items being pulled from the garage, Hank, Bongo, and McGillicuddy must try to recover their version of the inter-dimensional transporter from Bongo and McGilicuddy's nemesis Dr. Technology, who has escaped from jail.
71	20	"Space Conflicts VIII"	Eric Cazes	Erika Martin	14 December 2017
Tom and the gang are excited to see the eighth instalment of the Space Conflicts film series, but are shocked when Angela reveals she has never watched it. Tom lends her a copy of the entire series but she falls asleep trying to watch them. In a panic she learns all the basics about the series from Xenon so that she can pretend to be a fan and avoid offending Tom again. She almost convinces everyone, only to end up sleeping through the movie's premiere as she did when she tried watching the previous movies.
72	21	"Saving Santa"	Philipp Seis	Jim Hope	21 December 2017
Ben invents a Santa Claus tracker and finds that Santa has disappeared into the CEO's building. Tom and the gang try to sneak Ginger into the CEO's office but they are captured. The gang convince Darren to help them out, and they are able to track Santa to a room. However Santa will not let himself be rescued until they can restore the CEO's "Christmas spirit". This teaches the CEO a Christmas lesson.
73	22	"Angie Fierce"	Eric Cazes	Erika Martin	28 December 2017
Angela is afraid of attending the "Talent Stars" television audition because she suffers from stage fright and freezes every time she sees one of the judges, a celebrity named Ricky Deluna. When Tom and the gang give her a wig, saying that people act more confident when in disguise, she becomes Angie Fierce, her more confident alter ego. After succeeding in the auditions Angela continues to wear the wig. But her new Angie Fierce personality makes her more rude and act entitled, with removing the wig being the only way to make Angela her normal self. Angela's original personality eventually succeeds in getting rid of the wig and Angela returns to her normal self.
74	23	"Landlord in Love"	Lee Stringer and Philipp Seis	Jim Hope	15 February 2018
The Landlord chooses to sell the garage so he can move to the islands and find his soulmate. Tom and the gang scramble to find a reason for him to stay and stop the CEO from demolishing the garage. They succeed by convincing Ginger's teacher Ms. Vanthrax and the Landlord to meet Tom.
75	24	"Fishy Business"	Fernando Pomares	Kevin Pedersen	22 February 2018
The CEO promotes Darren to intern and tasks him with cleaning the goldfish bowl. Darren hates his new job and accidentally trips while cleaning the fish bowl. The fish falls out of a window and lands in Hank's slush drink. Hank takes care of the fish until Tom and the gang learn it is the CEO's convince Hank to return it. The CEO does not believe them until Darren slips and nearly lets the fish out of the window again. The CEO lets Tom and Hank leave without getting caught by security as a token of gratitude.
76	25	"Angela the Psychic"	Eric Cazes and Philipp Seis	Karen Anderson	1 March 2018
When returning home after watching a movie the gang spot an arcade dance machine at a yard sale, but don't have enough money to buy it. Ginger arrives with a bag full of coins but the Landlord takes the money to make up for his rent hike, saying that his psychic has quit and he needs a new one. Hank discovers that Ginger has been stealing the coins from the town's wishing fountain and warns Ginger of bad luck. Meanwhile Tom convinces Angela to become the Landlord's psychic, but she soon tires of always being called up by him. So she tries to convince the Landlord that he himself has psychic powers, only for him to find that Angela was trying to fool him into thinking so. However the Landlord makes two predictions in a fit of anger, both of which come true, and he is convinced that he is a psychic. Ginger gets the coins back and runs to return them, only to find that the fountain has been dug out for renovations.
77	26	"The Deep Secret"	Eric Cazes, Alejandro Lopez Granados	Matt Gossen	8 March 2018
The gang is playing a mystery detective role-playing game where the players must find out which one among them is a jewel thief. Tom finds Angela's diary while dressing up and reads it, finding out that Angela is keeping a secret. Tom becomes curious but decides not to betray Angela's trust. However his character card – an international spy named Bartholomew Wellington – starts to talk to him as a hallucination and goads him into finding out the truth. Tom snoops through Angela's emails and phone while Ben, Hank, and Angela play the game and Ginger plays on his phone. Angela skips to the accusation round as no one is able to concentrate. Ben and Angela accuse Tom of being the jewel thief and Tom accuses Angela of hiding a secret. He storms out of the apartment when Hank reveals that he is the thief. Angela explains to Tom that she was going to do a music video with Ricky Deluna and wanted to reveal it only when it was confirmed,. An embarrassed Tom reveals that he went through Angela's diary, email, and phone, and a disgusted Angela walks off. Tom throws his hat and character card away in anger and tries to apologise to Angela, but to no avail.

=== Season 3 (2018) ===
This season – the last to be animated by Arx Anima – was meant to be the second half of season 2 but was later greenlit as two separate seasons. This is also the last season where the characters are seen without clothes.

No. overall	No. in season	Title	Directed by	Written by	Original release date
78	1	"Pirates of Love"	Alejandro Lopez Granados	Jim Hope	10 May 2018
After the events of the previous episode, Angela is still angry at Tom. Although Ben has a Cupid-like invention that makes someone instantly attracted to another, Tom opts to apologise to Angela with a gift basket and a note. But when he sees her in a music video session with Ricky Deluna – who reveals he wants Angela for himself – Tom crashes the filming. Angela tells Tom they should spend some time apart. Dejected, Tom tries to use Ben's invention on himself in reverse mode so that he can forget his love, much to the horror of Ben, Hank, and Ginger. However when Angela learns of Ricky's true intentions she has the gang show Tom her live music video and succeeds in convincing Tom not to use the device at the last second.
79	2	"Superhero Picnic"	Fernando Pomares	Jim Hope	17 May 2018
When Hank and Ginger dress up and play as superheroes Cyber Hank and Sticky Ginger, Ben gets annoyed as they are distracting him from working on his invention that slows time. He lets the two play with his box of failed inventions and sends them off to bother Tom and Angela, who are out on a picnic date. Ginger and Hank then realise that Ben is the villain and go back to bother him, aka "Dr. Slowpoke". But Ben freezes them in time and Angela and Tom join as superheroes Dynamic Diva and Tom Guy. Ben is stopped but then lashes out at Hank and Ginger, accusing Tom and Angela of making them bother him. Tom reveals they wanted Hank and Ginger to bother Ben so they could enjoy the date, much to the dismay of Hank and the anger of Ginger, who freezes Tom, Angela, and Ben and then leaves to fight crime.
80	3	"Mission: Delete"	Fernando Pomares	Matt Gossen	24 May 2018
Tom and Angela find old embarrassing videos of themselves on the MyFace website. But when they attempt to delete them they get locked out of their accounts as they do not remember their passwords. They go to the MyFace headquarters, which happens to be in the CEO's tower, and come up with a heist plan to break into the server room. The CEO discovers them and kicks them out except for Ginger, who hid in a food cart and lets the gang back in. But before they can delete their videos Angela decides to keep her page due to all the memories on it. Tom deletes his page. Then Ben, Hank, and Ginger find an embarrassing video of the CEO and send it to him, much to his horror.
81	4	"A Garage Affair"	Eric Cazes and Alejandro Lopez Granados	Jim Hope	31 May 2018
After returning from a demolition event, Tom, Ben, Hank, and Ginger find that the door to their garage has been left open. Suspecting that a burglar has broken in they instead find Angela, who is upset that Tom had stood her up on a date (which Tom forgot about). To combat the lack of security Ben invents an artificial intelligence security system called Security Alarm Room Assistant (SARA). But SARA falls in love with Tom and then sabotages Tom and Angela's get-back-together date.
82	5	"Talent Show"	Fernando Pomares	Jim Hope	7 June 2018
Ginger asks Angela to teach him how to sing in order to win his school's singing contest. But he gets frustrated that all she has him do is activities that are not related to singing, like meditating, balancing books on his head, and so on. He quits. Meanwhile Ben is chosen as the host for the contest. But his friends deem him not funny enough for schoolchildren.
83	6	"The Queen of Drones"	Philipp Seis	Erika Martin	21 June 2018
When Tom and Ben's new Ooze invention does not interest Rhonda, Angela gets an idea of using delivery drones to serve food to customers. Tom and Ben dismiss the idea as Angela is not an inventor like them, so Angela teams up with Xenon to make the drone. The invention becomes a success, leading Tom and Ben to want to join in. But when Angela tries to make a better version on her own the invention goes out of control.
84	7	"Treasure Hunt"	Fernando Pomares	Kevin Pedersen	28 June 2018
Tom and Ben plan to spend the whole day organising their garage files which upsets Ginger who was planning on having fun on the first day of summer. During the filing Tom uncovers a treasure map. So the gang decide to look for the spot, only to find another map piece, and so on. Meanwhile Darren notices them and gets his uncle, the CEO, to help him steal the treasure at the end of the hunt. Darren and the CEO succeed and escape in a hot air balloon. But Tom, Ben, Angela, Ginger, and Hank hold on to it until Ben and Ginger persuade Tom to let go, and the friends land in the swimming pool in Ginger's house. Ginger later reveals that he made a fake map and hid it in Tom and Ben's papers because he wanted to have fun with his friends and that he filled the treasure chest with his insect collection. Darren and the CEO open the chest, much to their horror.
85	8	"The Galactic Friends"	Eric Cazes and Alejandro Lopez Granados	Kevin Pedersen	5 July 2018
Ben gets into a slump with his inventions and threatens to quit. But then his "Listen-o-Meter" picks up a message from an alien named Allen. Ginger believes that the alien might be hostile and be planning to take over the world. Ben's friends are convinced by Ginger that Ben's device is meant to destroy life on earth. They try to sabotage Ben's work but fail. Tom later discovers that Hank had pretended to be the alien so that Ben would not quit, while the invention is found to be the most mathematically fun waterslide.
86	9	"Troubled Couples"	Fernando Pomares	Kevin Pedersen	12 July 2018
In order to get a trampoline for the garage, Tom and Angela persuade the Landlord and Ms. Vanthrax to attend a couples retreat with them. But they discover that it may be a scam when Dr. Internet Doctor runs tests on Tom and Angela to make them think their own relationship is in deep trouble. Meanwhile Ben invents a spray that can make any surface bouncy, but Ginger applies it to the entire garage and he bounces out of control.
87	10	"The Lost Scouts"	Fernando Pomares	James Woodham	19 July 2018
Ginger wants to earn the top scouting badge on their troop's wilderness survival trip with Scoutmaster Tom, but he faces stiff competition from Darren. While arguing over who gets to use the map, the two get separated from the group and fall into a pit. Meanwhile Angela and Ben argue over whether natural instincts or technology would be better for surviving in the wilderness. They join Tom and the other scouts in search of Darren and Ginger.
88	11	"Hero Hank"	Alejandro Lopez Granados	James Woodham	26 July 2018
Hoping to act like a hero, Hank gets a security job at a comic book store for their nerd game convention, but it turns out to be more about cleaning. Tom and Angela become hooked on collecting Pokémon-based rare Pleekymon cards, while Ben and Ginger get involved in a role-playing game. But when Hank pursues a suspicious player he discovers that all the Pleekymon cards at the convention are fake and must save Tom and Angela from the fraud.
89	12	"Fancy Party"	Philipp Seis and Lee Stringer	Marty Abbe-Schneider	2 August 2018
Tom, Angela, and Ben attend a fancy party in order to network with rich people to promote their garage business. Tom is uncomfortable with the rich people and Angela is mistaken for a food and drink server because her dress coincidentally matches those of the servers. Ben tries to fit in and meets the CEO, who persuades him to lower his guard and put his invention in a "neutral grounds security box" trunk, only to claim it for himself later. Meanwhile, Ginger and Hank have their own fancy party at the garage after not being allowed to come.
90	13	"The Substitute Teacher"	Alejandro Lopez Granados	Matt Gossen	9 August 2018
Tom and Hank try to repair the refrigerator without Ben's help. Angela suggests calling a handyman but gets a call from Ms. Vanthrax, who is ill. Ben takes over Ms. Vanthrax's class, and hopes to inspire the kids to come up with a good science fair project. Ginger and his classmates try to slack off and misbehave which angers Ben. Tom advises Ben to try to be a "cool teacher" which works briefly but means that Ben's class is nowhere close to having any science project ideas. A panicking Ben tries to inspire the class to create a good idea for their project, and finds an idea that also interests the class involving paper airplanes.
91	14	"Tom the Brave"	Philipp Seis	Jim Hope	20 September 2018
After Tom is too scared to visit the dentist Hank hypnotises Tom in order to face his fear. However the hypnosis is far too effective, and Tom takes things to another level and starts doing dangerous stunts. After a serious injury Tom wakes up to find his friends mourning his death (though he is alive) at his hospital bed in order to snap him out of his hypnosis.
92	15	"The Sixth Friend"	Alejandro Lopez Granados	James Woodham	27 September 2018
The gang learns that their town has been stripped of their title of Friendliest Town in the World. The Landlord sublets MC to live in the garage with Tom and the gang. But his excessive friendliness gets on the gang's nerves andl they make him leave, only to realise that he is the perfect solution to the town's problem of not being the friendliest town in the world.
93	16	"Kids Again"	Philipp Seis	Matt Gossen	4 October 2018
Upset that Tom and his friends are too "mature" to play with him and are instead waiting for Autumn Summers. They want to sell her Ben's anti-aging cream so as to pay the rent. Ginger leaves and makes a wish for them to be younger. When Hank inadvertently mistakes the cream for a bagel spread while making food, the gang shrinks in size, age, and maturity to kindergarteners. At first Ginger is excited to play with the gang but soon realises that it is tough to take care of them. He eventually manages to reverse the effect in time for Summers' meeting, but Autumn Summers leaves without buying the cream because she smells what she considers to be "the smell of children". The landlord arrives and evicts them, claiming all their belongings, only to eat the anti-aging cream.
94	17	"The Other Tom"	Philipp Seis	James Woodham	11 October 2018
Tom tries to enjoy his day off but his friends ask him to do a bunch of errands. While outside he meets a cat named Tim who looks just like him. They agree to switch places. Tom works at a carnival while Tim does the errands. However Tom later discovers that Tim is actually a robot built by the CEO in a plot to trash Tom's public image. He has to leave the carnival to save his image.
95	18	"The Big Nano Lie"	Alejandro Lopez Granados	Becky Feldman	18 October 2018
Ben completes his latest invention, a "nanolaser", when Tom and Hank force him to accompany them to the carnival. Angela and Ginger arrive and play soccer in the garage and Ginger accidentally damages the nanolaser. Angela tries to fix it but fails. At the carnival Mel and Flo overhear Ben talking about his nanolaser and congratulate him for his accomplishment and become friends. After Tom, Hank, and Ben return, Ginger keeps Ben from looking at his laser by taking him to his house for an interview. That night, Angela has a nightmare involving Ben and goes to the garage to confess. She finds him angrily talking to himself about the laser and he walks off before Angela can confess. Tom and Hank then reveal that they had damaged the device before and realise that Ben wants to sabotage Mel and Flo's lab as he thinks that they are the culprits. The friends find him in the lab where he is about to destroy Mel and Flo's work with their laser, and confess that they had damaged it and tried to fix the device. Ben calmly dismisses the damage as being due to clumsiness. But he accidentally pushes a lever and gets it stuck, activating the laser and destroying Mel and Flo's work. The gang then escape from the laboratory as Mel and Flo lament their loss.
96	19	"Corn Heads"	Fernando Pomares	Jim Hope	25 October 2018
Hank runs out of popcorn on a movie night so he decides to plant his own. However Hank becomes impatient with the corn and uses an excess of Ben's growth formula to speed up the process, despite Angela's objection to messing with nature. Later Angela discovers that her friends have been brainwashed to be "of the corn" by the "mother corn", a giant corn cob that controls the minds of anyone who eats corn grown with the growth formula. Angela enters the garage pretending to have been brainwashed so as to stop the mother corn, and gets caught. However, she manages to reverse Tom's brainwashing and manages to destroy the mother corn with heat lamps, turning it into popcorn and bringing Ben, Hank and Ginger back to normal.
97	20	"Hank vs. Vampires"	Alejandro Lopez Granados	Martin Horvat	1 November 2018
A mysterious door-to-door salesman sells Hank a subscription to 500 TV channels. Hank decides to watch a channel called Vampire TV. He hallucinates and believes that his friends are the vampires, forcing his friends to bring him back from that belief by actually pretending to be vampires.
98	21	"The Dance Contest"	Alejandro Lopez Granados	Jim Hope	15 November 2018
Tom and the gang want to participate in a dance contest in which Tom, being the Mayor, is also a judge. But with the Landlord on vacation, Ms. Vanthrax becomes their substitute landlord. She sets extremely strict rules on what they can do, especially banning dancing under penalty of detention chores. Ginger coaxes Ms. Vanthrax into taking a nap so they can sneak out, but she eventually catches them at the contest. But when Ginger does a special move it is revealed why Ms. Vanthrax dislikes dancing and that she herself had created that special dance move.
99	22	"Unfriend 'Em All!"	Philipp Seis	Matt Gossen	22 November 2018
When Tom sees a guy he does not like at a party Ben invents a device named "The Unfriender", which can block anyone who disagrees with a person in real life and turn them into smiley faces that babble nonsense. But the experiment turns into a disaster when Tom interferes with the reversal procedure and his own friends are blocked too. Tom gets lost in the desert. Later, his friends find him and Ben creates an invention to reverse the effects once and for all by making Tom make amends with the person he hates.
100	23	"The Yes Girl"	Philipp Seis	Matt Gossen	29 November 2018
Angela worries about her career so Rhonda helps her by letting Angela borrow a book about positivity. The book claims that one can be happy only by saying yes to everything. At first everything seems to go right in her life with her new attitude, but when she has to get an invention to Tom and Ben at the TV studio and drop Ginger off at his school, she gets in trouble with the police for breaking traffic rules.
101	24	"Cheat Code"(Part 1)	Philipp Seis	Matt Gossen	13 December 2018
Tom and Ben visit Builder X, a great Squarestack player, who is none other than Ginger's friend Ronnie. He gives them a cheat code USB to get more resources, but they don't listen and mess up the code. Meanwhile, Angela tries to get perfect song ideas.: Angela's Songs: "Hope for a Good Day"; Trivia: Squarestack is based upon the game of Minecraft.
102	25	"Retro Sonic Angela" (Part 2)	Philipp Seis	Kevin Pedersen	20 December 2018
Angela tries to make her own electronic song and Tom promises to support her. Meanwhile Ben tries to fix his computer with Xenon. However, the song is awful and Angela decides to retire here singing career, after the crowd heckle and Tom leaves the concert.
103	26	"Glitch Apocalypse" (Part 3)	Fernando Pomares	Kevin Pedersen	27 December 2018
Tom and Ben attempt to stop the Zappers after they manage to open a passageway into the real world. At the concert Angela distracts the Zappers to allow Hank and Ginger to escape them. However even their combined efforts prove futile in stopping the Zappers, forcing Tom and Ben to enlist the aid of Jeremy the germ.

=== Season 4 (2019–20) ===
The animation style changed when Outfit7 Limited moved production of season 4 to the Spanish animation studio People Moving Pixels in 2018. For example, this is the first season to feature the main characters in clothes. At the time of the move Stefan Fjeldmark announced that seasons 4 and 5 would be made at the same time, a total of 52 episodes.

No. overall	No. in season	Title	Directed by	Written by	Original release date
104	1	"Where's Angela?" (Part 1)	Phillip Berg	Kevin Pedersen	16 May 2019
Angela is still missing and Tom is desperate to find her. But the usually-helpful Ben has been banned from using tech and is made to wear a bracelet that zaps him whenever he tries to use any technology. His internet girlfriend Xenon is now working for a mysterious organisation called "The Agency" so Tom and the gang infiltrate the Agency. They discover that she is actually an undercover agent who wants to help them. Using a device called the Privacy Destroyer, Tom, Ginger, and Hank enter a portal and find Angela in the digital world giving a concert to the Zappers.
105	2	"The Digital Queen" (Part 2)	Phillip Berg	Kevin Pedersen	23 May 2019
Angela is now living in the digital world and has been brainwashed into thinking she is a musician Zapper. Tom, Hank, and Ginger try to convince her to return to their world. Meanwhile Ben and Xenon attempt to keep the Agency's forces from entering the Privacy Destroyer room in orderd to gain some time for Tom and the gang. Tom finally overcomes Angela's brainwashing and brings her back, and the friends escape back to the garage.
106	3	"The Good Germ"	Niels A. Dolmer and Stefan Fjeldmark	Jim Hope	4 July 2019
Tom and the gang are celebrating Angela's return with a party. But their new roommate Jeremy attempts to trouble them with his contempt of hygiene so they choose to ignore him. Upset, he decides to turn over a new leaf and become a "clean germ". But he gets mad when the gang seem to overlook his efforts and make messes. He ties them to a bouncy castle and cleans up after them by eating the trash, growing into a massive monster that wreaks havoc on the town. The gang stops his rampage and reverts his growth, showing Jeremy that they accept his new lifestyle.
107	4	"Ben's Digital Detox"	Stefan Fjeldmark	Jim Hope	11 July 2019
Ben is still banned from using technology so he tries to find something new to do with his life, but fails in everything he tries. In a moment of weakness he lies to his scientific rivals Mel and Flo, saying that he has become a famous art collector and received an expensive painting, which was kept in the garage only because the museum got flooded. He soon realises his careless words have caused Mel and Flo to plan on stealing the painting, and decides to defend the painting using ordinary science instead of technology.
108	5	"Worst Mayor Ever"	Phillip Berg	James Woodham	18 July 2019
As Tom gets ready to retire as the town mayor he realises that the key to the city has gone missing. Hank investigates the case as the official "Town Detective" and tries to catch the culprit before Tom's reputation is ruined. He discovers that the key was lost inadvertently due to an unfortunate series of events. With Ginger's help, Hank succeeds in getting the key and saves Tom's reputation as mayor.
109	6	"Tom the Bodyguard"	Niels A. Dolmer and Stefan Fjeldmark	Becky Feldman	25 July 2019
After a heckler threatens to hit Angela with a pie during her comeback concert Tom decides to become her bodyguard. But he fails to stop Angela from getting hit with a pie, and soon finds himself replaced by a new bodyguard, who turns out to be the heckler. Meanwhile Ginger tries to help Ben take off his anti-tech bracelet in return for being able to watch a movie.
110	7	"The Great Taxi Race"	Phillip Berg	Kevin Pedersen	19 September 2019
Ben comes up with a plan to save "Tom and Ben Enterprises" by starting the town's only taxi service. The business booms because Ben runs the only taxi in town until a new self-driving car shows up that is superior in every way. Desperate to save their company, Tom and Ben challenge the self-driving cab to a taxi race where the loser will have to leave town. Using Angela's advice to provide "service with a smile", they eventually defeat the self-driving car.
111	8	"Supermodel Tom"	Phillip Berg	Jim Hope	26 September 2019
Tom gets "discovered" during a Fashion Week event and becomes the town's newest model. But when his friends treat him like a fool he realises he is suffering the mysterious "Model's Curse". Tom and his fellow models try to escape the curse and eventually succeed, saving Ginger from flying away with stolen balloons.
112	9	"Who is Becca?"	Stefan Fjeldmark	Becky Feldman	4 October 2019
When Angela realises that the hit song "Little Miss Perfect" by Becca Sparkles is actually a diss track about her she decides to fire back at the singer with a diss track of her own. But Angela's diss is too mean and it ruins Becca's life. So a guilt-ridden Angela decides to seek out the angry rival singer and find a way to make peace with her, realising that the entire feud was because of a misunderstanding at one of Angela's concerts.
113	10	"Mystery Crate Empire"	Stefan Fjeldmark	Becky Feldman	11 October 2019
The friends try to start a box-subscription service where they sell all their old junk so they can pay the rent. But when the business gets too popular too fast they run out of stuff to sell and get evicted for removing things from the garage. Now Tom and his friends must get back all the things they sold so that they can live in the garage again.
114	11	"Save The Tree"	Michael Helmuth Hansen and Phillip Berg	Martin Horvat	18 October 2019
Angela wants to use her music career to make the world a better place. She finds the perfect cause when she learns that the Landlord is planning to chop down the tree in front of the garage. She tries to stop him by living in the tree and works to make her protest go viral. But her ecological movement hits a big snag when she learns that the tree is infested with butt-pinching bugs.
115	12	"Movie Star Angelo"	Michael Helmuth Hansen and Stefan Fjeldmark	Cameron Hope	25 October 2019
Angela wants to audition for a movie about her favorite anime hero, Starlight Blue, but the movie's director decides to make Starlight Blue a guy. She goes undercover as "Angelo", a dude, to get the part. But on the set of the movie the friends soon realise that the director is planning on making many changes to the movie with the intention of ruining it as he hated the character when he was a child.
116	13	"The Secret Life of Ms. Vanthrax"	Phillip Berg	Matt Gossen	30 October 2019
After being called up by Ms. Vanthrax for a school project Ginger discovers that Ms. Vanthrax is secretly a monster hunter, on the trail of a happiness-eating beast. He confronts her and forces her to let him tag along on the hunt, eager to see his first real monster. But when he panics at the sight of the creature it escapes and starts taking over the carnival's "Jamboree of Joy" where Ginger's friends happen to be. Ginger and Ms. Vanthrax must work together to save the town before it is deprived of happiness forever.
117	14	"The Mystery of the Pyramid"	Stefan Fjeldmark	Jim Hope	8 November 2019
Angela is set to perform a concert at a giant pyramid set up by Ricky Deluna as a way of making peace with his enemies (including MC and Victoria Payne). Tom feels suspicious about the concert, but after the MC and Ricky himself disappear the friends fear that the concert has come under a mummy's curse. They work together to stop the mummy, both to save Angela's concert and to save their own lives.
118	15	"Happy Anniversary"	Stefan Fjeldmark	Jim Hope	15 November 2019
Tom and Angela scramble to find the perfect anniversary gifts for each other after having nearly forgotten about their anniversary. They try to figure out if they should celebrate their big day with a trip to the opera or the soccer game. However Tom trades his soccer game tickets with the Landlord for limited edition opera glasses, while Angela trades her opera tickets with Ms. Vanthrax for a soccer jersey, making each other mad.
119	16	"The Cursed Game"	Niels Andersen Dolmer	James Woodham	29 November 2019
For "Family Game Night" Ben shows everyone a mysterious game called "Welcome to the Dungeon". But when the friends get sucked inside the game, they learn that the only way out is to beat it, which they find near-impossible because of the dragon and dungeon keeper at the end of the game. Aong with Jeremy, they resort to memorising every rule in the game so that they can catch the dragon and dungeon keeper every time they violate a rule.
120	17	"Hank's TV Party"	Stefan Fjeldmark	James Woodham	5 December 2019
Hank gets sick on his birthday, which at first is a sad thing for him. Hiis friends leave him and Jeremy at the garage so that they can go to the fair. However when Hank spills some soup on his TV remote he inadvertently causes all of his favourite TV show characters to appear in the garage. Hank and his cartoon friends party, leading to Jeremy getting jealous as he is no longer the centre of attention, until the villainous Kaptain Kriminal takes over. With his birthday party and guests at risk Hank teams up once again with his TV heroes Bongo and McGillicuddy, and Jeremy, to take out the bad guys and save the day.
121	18	"The Bad Germ"	Niels Andersen Dolmer	Matt Gossen	13 December 2019
Jeremy prepares for a food festival. His brother Nigel comes for a visit and tries to make him evil again by making him believe that all people think of him as just a germ.
122	19	"Space Rescue"	Phillip Berg	Kevin Pedersen	20 December 2019
Tom is sent to space as a reward for collecting cereal boxes for a contest. However, the whole contest is a scheme devised by the CEO who wants to get rid of Tom once and for all. Tom's friends comes up with a plan to save him, but it does not go as planned because of Ben's anti-technology bracelet. Fortunately, in an unexpected turn of events, the bracelet falls in love with Ginger's astronaut watch (which Tom won in the contest) and then leaves to be with it, allowing Ben to use technology once again. Tom is brought back to Earth with Ben's invention and the CEO, who wanted to watch Tom's fate, is knocked away into the outer reaches of outer space in the chaos.
123	20	"The Weather Machine"	Niels Andersen Dolmer	Jim Hope	21 December 2019
Ginger and Angela's kiteboarding race in the park gets cancelled due to a thunderstorm, despite Action Weatherman Skip Flipper saying that it was going to be sunny. Ben, who is now able to use tech, invents a weather machine that can make the weather calm for Skip. However after the weather becomes absurd with raining diapers, screaming clouds, and the like affecting the area, Tom goes to the TV station to investigate, but is stopped by Skip. Tom pushes him aside and discovers that Skip had damaged the machine because no one was watching his reports when the weather was calm. Skip sarcastically confesses and Tom reveals that Hank, Angela, and Ginger had recorded and broadcast Skip's confession. A sad Ben sees the confession on TV and leaves to help Tom after Skip damages the machine further, causing a tornado made of garbage. Tom successfully shuts down the machine while his friends shield him from debris. Later, Ben tells his friends that he has made some changes to the machine so that the machine gives calm weather only sometimes, Skip hosts his show from prison, saying that the weather will be "sunny and drier than prison pot roast", only for it to start raining at that moment.
124	21	"Boyfriend Stealer"	Stefan Fjeldmark	Becky Feldman	22 December 2019
Tom and the gang get ready for their annual dance party, which has been changed from a tropical-themed party to a snow-themed "Snow Ball" after the water pipes burst, with Becca creating the playlist. Later, while shopping with Ben, Angela sees Becca ostensibly flirting with Tom and confronts Tom over it. Tom denies having flirted and Angela leaves in disgust, having a "pity party" for herself at the diner. Rhonda tells her to go with another date to make Tom feel desperate. At the party Angela arrives with the MC while Ben tells Tom that Becca seems to really like Tom. On seeing Angela with MC Tom goes with Becca for a dance. When Angela announces that there is a boyfriend stealer in the party Becca confesses that she had a crush on Hank and that Tom kept on getting in her way when she wanted to subtly show her love. A speaker explodes and everyone runs out in fright. Angela records herself talking about how the party was terrible and that Tom will never speak to her again. Tom arrives and tells her that if Angela had not forgiven him every time Tom made a mistake they would have broken up long ago. He comforts Angela and the friends return and have their party.
125	22	"The New CEO"	Niels Andersen Dolmer	Matt Gossen	31 January 2020
The CEO leaves town, putting his pet goldfish Goldie in charge. However Hank is put in charge of the headquarters as Goldie is deemed incapable of making decisions. But Hank finds it boring and adds fun activities to the tower. A hallucination of the CEO tells Hank to give him "a power smile" which ends up making him evil-minded and putting his friends in danger.
126	23	"Chocolate Battle"	Phillip Berg	Cameron Hope	14 February 2020
While at the Chocolate Museum the friends learn about the "Chocolate Games", a last-man-standing tournament where players must keep their chocolate on their helmet while making other people's chocolates fall off. The last man standing gets a giant chocolate statue. However Darren enters the game and Ben and Hank are the first to be eliminated. Later, Ginger is eliminated by Darren, but notices that Darren's chocolate did not fall off his helmet. In the end Tom and Angela are eliminated and Darren is declared the winner. However, Ginger goes back to the forest where the game was held and collects evidence, convincing the gang that Darren is cheating. They investigate and find that the museum owner let Darren cheat in exchange for Nougat Lisa. They gatecrash the awards ceremony and prove that Darren and the owner had cheated. An angry crowd chases them away and the statue is divided amongst the public, though the chocolate pieces are the same size as the small pieces given to the visitors. Later, Ginger leaves with a full arm of the statue.
127	24	"Basketball Hero"	Michael Helmuth Hansen and Stefan Fjeldmark	James Woodham	28 February 2020
After Ginger's basketball team loses yet another game Ginger asks Hank to return to third grade in order to be eligible to participate in Ginger's team. However Hank fails his test and is told by Ms. Vanthrax that if he fails the next one he will not be allowed to participate in the sport team. Then Hank is pressured by Ronnie and Darren to sneak into Ms. Vanthrax's room and get the test answers. Ginger tells Tom, Ben, and Angela that Hank is falling in with a bad group and they find Hank missing from his room. Hank returns to school under the pretext of returning the team mascot costume and is about to get the test answers when his friends find him and try to stop him. Ginger agrees to steal all the test answers so that things will be easier. But Hank decides to not cheat so that Ginger won't have to steal. He studies for the test all night and passes. During the basketball game Hank falls asleep while trying to score points, and Ginger scores at the last moment, only to be disappointed that Hank is asleep and has not seen him score.
128	25	"Escape: Impossible!"	Stefan Fjeldmark	James Woodham	13 March 2020
The friends are invited to a party in the storage room, but realise that is actually a trap set up by an unknown person. Bongo and McGillicuddy (who happen to be watching the episode) investigate by using various episode clips from throughout the show to reveal the villain and discover that the culprit is the very first villain in the series: Gilbert, from "Friendly Customer Service". Meanwhile, Hank realises that Gilbert is the villain and Ginger reveals that he had turned Gilbert back on. So the friends pretend to like the room and appreciate whoever set it up. Gilbert enters the room and the friends unplug him.
129	26	"Good Girls Fall for Bad Boys"	Stefan Fjeldmark	Kevin Pedersen and Matt Gossen	27 March 2020
Angela tells Tom that she took a quiz that says that their relationship is boring, and Tom says that he has to go to renew his business licence. Later, Xenon arrives and tells Angela that the Agency has created a satellite that can destroy gravity with the intention of sending everyone floating into space. Angela and Xenon must travel to an alternate dimension where Tom works for the Agency so that they can get the password to access the Agency mainframe and disable the satellite. Xenon gags the other Angela and Xenon to impersonate them, and goes out with the original Angela, Tom, and Ben. To her horror, Angela finds that she is falling for the Tom working for the Agency even though he is evil. Later Angela manages to find the password from Tom. The other Angela and Xenon arrive and the original Angela and Xenon make a run for it, getting rid of the evil Tom when in the alternate universe where fire was never discovered. Xenon successfully destroys the satellite and leaves.

=== Season 5 (2020–21) ===
Season 5 aired first on Pop in 2020 before being officially released on YouTube. Episodes 18 to 26 were premiered monthly in 2021.

No. overall	No. in season	Title	Directed by	Written by	Original release date
130	1	"Neighbor Roy"	Stefan Fjeldmark	Matt Gossen	8 May 2020
Tom's new neighbor – Roy Rakoon – was somehow better than Tom, making him jealous. During a housewarming party at Roy's mansion, Tom discovers a secret entrance under the home with a secret door to a suspicious tunnel. Later, he chases Roy through town after he stole the Space Ruby.: Angela's Songs: "Host With the Most"
131	2	"Hank's First Date"	Stefan Fjeldmark	James Woodham	22 May 2020
Hank gets nervous on his first date with Becca. Tom advises him to fake it. During the date Hank gets caught by the goons of criminal Tony Macaroni by sitting at his table. He and Becca must run away from them and make sure that Becca does not know why.
132	3	"Smash the Trash"	Stefan Fjeldmark	James Woodham	5 June 2020
Ben invents a machine that flattens anything. The gang accidentally overloads the invention, turning them into flat paper. Since Ben was left in the garage the rest of the gang need to get back there before the Landlord evicts them for not cleaning.
133	4	"Micro Spy Tom"	Stefan Fjeldmark	Becky Feldman	19 June 2020
Before an auction hosted by Roy, Tom uses Ben's new shrinking submarine to spy on Roy inside his body. He makes a mistake and crashes into Roy's brain. Ben, Hank, and Ginger use the taxi to shrink and rescue Tom, while Angela deals with the outside world at the auction.
134	5	"The New Old Roommate"	Stefan Fjeldmark	Becky Feldman	3 July 2020
The friends aret haunted by a female ghost, who originally lived in Angela's apartment. Angela tries to be roommates with her but the ghost has frightening problems doing so. The gang has no choice but to go on a ghost hunt.
135	6	"Ginger and the Girl"	Niels A. Dolmer	Becky Feldman	17 July 2020
Ginger is upset and embarrassed at being partnered with a "girl" named Tonya, with Ronnie being partnered with Darren. After hearing about Ginger and Tonya's invention plan, Darren and Ronnie decide to steal their idea.
136	7	"Dude Ranch Showdown"	Phillip Berg	Matt Gossen	31 July 2020
At the prestigious Dude Ranch the gang pretends to be Ginger's family since his parents are out of town. Tom discovers a map of the ranch under Roy's cowboy hat.
137	8	"Waitress Angela"	Stefan Fjeldmark and Niels Anderson Dolmer	Matt Gossen	14 August 2020
Rhonda wins a charity raffle and decides Angela is to work for her in the diner, but Angela finds it too difficultf. Later she learns that Rhonda had her spoon supply stolen and she needs to pay rent. Angela wants to help.: Angela's Songs: "Dishwashing Song (by Rhonda)" and "Save the Diner".
138	9	"Beach Day in the Desert"	Stefan Fjeldmark	Kevin Pedersen	28 August 2020
Tom and the gang are going to the beach on the last day of summer. Unfortunately the gas runs out, leaving the bus stranded in the desert) Tom and Angela decide to have a beach day in the desert, with Tom having brought ice pops for him and Angela for their date. But Hank, Ginger, and Becca have to fight back he crowd after refusing to give them the ice pops.
139	10	"Roommate War"	Stefan Fjeldmark	Cameron Hope	11 September 2020
Angela and Becca are not able to get along in their apartment because they like different things. Tom talks about solving friendships and so Angela tries to do things with Becca.
140	11	"Prank Attack!"	Stefan Fjeldmark	Martin Horvat	25 September 2020
Ginger celebrates prank day but it is bad for his friends as he keeps pranking them. But thanks to Becca they decide to prank him back. But something suspicious was going on with Ginger during an alien prank.
141	12	"The Lullaby Monster"	Stefan Fjeldmark	Martin Horvat	9 October 2020
Because of Ben's brain frying Angela sang him a lullaby to make him sleep. However Ben makes a machine to record Angela's lullaby. Later, Hank and Ginger made a lullaby hologram with the machine which is a lullaby singing hologram version of Angela. Unfortunately the hologram is plotting to make the whole world sleep and it is up to Angela to stop it.: Angela's Songs: "Lullaby Song" and "Wake Up Song"
142	13	"My Sweet Halloween"	Stefan Fjeldmark	Jim Hope	23 October 2020
Ginger tells the gang about the Halloween house decoration contest. Tom and the friends are up against Roy who has scarier decoration. However Ben invents a ray to make decorations come to life and they make walking pumpkins in front of the garage. But because of the friends' dill-treatment of them, the pumpkins start to attack the friends and Roy.
143	14	"Alert! Parents in Town"	Stefan Fjeldmark	James Woodham	6 November 2020
The MC is too miserable to start a dance party, even when Tom and Ben offer him their new dance app. The MC is sad because his parents are coming to town to see his business. So Tom and his friends disguise the garage as a business company, doing too much hard work for the MC as a boss in a contest to sell 500 blenders.
144	15	"The Incredible Super-Fan"	Stefan Fjeldmark and Micheal Helmuth Hansen	James Woodham	20 November 2020
Disliking a brand new mobile game, Hank wants people to see how the Show Bongo & McGillicuddy is better then their game. However, Hank takes revenge by deleting all the copies of the mobile game and disguising himself as Super-Fan. His friends try to find Hank with two undercover out-of-town cops.
145	16	"Tom the Guru"	Phillip Berg	Erin Mallorry Long	4 December 2020
Because Tom accidentally brings Angela's shopping list instead of his speech, everybody loves his philosophy of food (including Hank). Although the friends later dislike the idea of Tom having wisdom as a guru, everybody joins in, causing havoc with the food. Later, Tom is caught out by them and tells the truth.
146	17	"Santa’s Phone"	Phillip Berg and Stefan Fjeldmark	Marvin Horvat	18 December 2020
When the friends go to the town square Santa is not there. They find Santa's phone, showing that all of the friends were on the naughty list. Ben makes a hacking editor and the friends hack their misdeeds from the past 5 seasons. However Hank is against the gang doing this, and it backfires when they all fight for the phone to get themselves on the nice list.
147	18	"Roy to the Rescue"	Stefan Fjeldmark	Becky Feldman	26 March 2021
During a hot air balloon charity race Tom is saved by Roy after Tom gets a hole in his balloon. The two are lost in the woods, with Tom thinking that Roy will become famous and better than him. So Tom does whatever dangerous things it takes in order to save his life.
148	19	"Becca Fierce"	Stefan Fjeldmark	Phillip Berg and Kevin Pedersen	30 April 2021
The friends hear that Becca is competing for the Brave Race competition, wearing the same wig that Angela wore back on Angie Fierce. Angela locks the wig in a chest but Becca will still wants to wear it. The friends try to remove the wig from her head, but unfortunately the wig goes on to others and possesses them. Tom and the friends try to stop the wig.
149	20	"Breakup Curse"	Stefan Fjeldmark	Matt Gossen	28 May 2021
Angela believes her fortune cookie at a Chinese restaurant, expectng her heart to break at 12:00 at the beach. Tom and Angela try to avoid their cursed fortune by avoiding the number 12. Becca is swapping fortunes with others back at the Chinese restaurant.
150	21	"The Brave Sir Ginger"	Neils Anderson and Stefan Fjeldmark	Jim Hope	18 June 2021
During a not so interesting tour Ginger finds the Sword of Virtue. He lifts the sword from its stone with everybody watching. Ginger plays with the sword and the sword begins teaching Ginger how to be a knight. Ginger disagrees and causes havoc on the streets. Later it turns out that Hank was kidnapped by an evil wizard. Tom and the friends take the sword and prepare to be ready to fight by sundown.
151	22	"Who is Billy?"	Phillip Berg and Stefan Fjeldmark	James Woodham	27 August 2021
Tom has created a fake online identity named Billy to spy on Roy, but his friends dislike the idea. Tom deletes Billy from the internet and Roy is surprised and shocked he is missing.Roy believes that he has to find Billy with his person tracker. Tom must plan something that is foolproof for everybody to understand about Billy.: Songs: "Remembering Billy (by Roy)" and "Billy, Come Back! (by a crowd)"
152	23	"Angela's New Look"	Niels Andersen Dolmer and Stefan Fjeldmark	Becky Feldman	1 October 2021
Angela is tired after her busy, scheduled week and mistakenly goes into Ben's cloning machine with a soccer ball in it. Angela becomes a soccer ball. Tom helps her to be a person while Ben fixes the cloning machine. Angela goes in again and she still is a soccer ball. Angela sadly takes herself to the soccer playoffs as the ball for the game. It is up to her friends to get her back.
153	24	"Genius Test"	Stefan Fjeldmark	Matt Gossen	29 October 2021
In a test at school Ginger's results are perfect, leading Ms. Vanthrax to believe that Ginger is a genius. Ginger dislikes it, but when he goes to school everybody respects him as a genius, including his own friends. So he decides to go to the candy factory, where things couldn't go worse. Although Tom and his friends believe Ginger is a lucky guesser, they try to rescue himj at the factory before the marshmallow tank explodes.
154	25	"Everybody Hates Tom" (Part 1)	Stefan Fjeldmark and Phillip Berg	Kevin Pedersen	26 November 2021
Tom and Ben's invention dubbed the Helping Hand is popular as a hit. But during a tech conference every Helping Hand is completely out of control, resulting in everybody hating Tom and Ben. The friends and Roy try to find out where the Helping Hands were stealing jewels and valuables. After being saved by Roy during a fight with the Helping hands, Tom's friends see that he is sabotaging things by hacking the Helping Hands. Everyone hates him.
155	26	"Talking Roy and Friends" (Part 2)	Phillip Berg	Matt Gossen and Kevin Pedersen	24 December 2021
A homeless Tom is kidnapped by some of his enemies who reveal that they need his help. They and Tom do a heist during a launch party, so that he can prove that Roy is evil and that he is innocent.

=== Minisodes (2015–16) ===
No.	Title	Directed by	Written by	Original release date
1	"Stop copying me"	Udo Beissel	Hugh Webber	5 February 2015
Tom starts copying Hank's actions and words. After trying to get Tom to stop Hank does a long crazy sequence of actions. But Tom claims that he missed it and makes Hank do it again, just so that Hank entertains him.
2	"Anti-social"	Greg Manwaring	James Woodham	19 February 2015
Tom finds the rest of the gang stuck in their chairs staring at their devices. Tom believes his hypnotising app works, but then his friends snap out of it and tell him that the app is boring and lame.
3	"Ben the Comedian"	Udo Beissel	James Woodham	19 March 2015
Ben does stand-up comedy involving science, but no one laughs. But when he tries to explain his joke and starts tripping over cables and knocking over things the audience laughs, much to Ben's chagrin.
4	"Super Vacuum"	Greg Manwaring	James Woodham	2 April 2015
Hank makes Ginger vacuum the floor so he can eat Ginger's sandwich. But when Ginger catches Hank eating his sandwich he vacuums the sandwich and Hank inside, puts the sandwich in the trash, and leaves.
5	"Good Morning Tom"	Udo Beissel	James Woodham, Boris Dolenc	16 April 2015
Hank wakes Tom up from a dream. But Tom does not want to go to work so Ben uses his robot to drag a cranky Tom out of bed.
6	"There's an App for That"	Udo Beissel	Hugh Webber	3 September 2015
Tom brings Ben a list of apps they could make. But Ben shows that all of them have already been created and applies some of them to Tom.
7	"Hank's Bike"	Udo Beissel	James Woodham	17 September 2015
Tom raps about Hank's custom bicycle, though Hank and Angela have no idea what Tom is doing. Angela quips that even Tom does not know what he is doing.
8	"Angela's Surprise"	Greg Manwaring	Boris Dolenc, James Woodham	4 February 2016
Angela is annoyed that the guys have forgotten her birthday and are making her do errands. In a fit of rage she destroys the box she was made to carry to the garage, only to discover that her friends had planned a surprise birthday party and that she has destroyed her own birthday cake.
