= Talking Tom & Friends (disambiguation) =

- Talking Tom & Friends, a video game franchise
- Talking Tom & Friends (TV series)
