= Sunday, Cruddy Sunday =

- The Simpsons episode
- Episode no.: Season 10; Episode 12
- Directed by: Steven Dean Moore
- Written by: Tom Martin; George Meyer; Brian Scully; Mike Scully
- Production code: AABF08
- Original air date: January 31, 1999

Guest appearances
- Troy Aikman as himself; Rosey Grier as himself; John Madden as himself; Dan Marino as himself; Rupert Murdoch as himself; Dolly Parton as herself; Pat Summerall as himself; Fred Willard as Wally Kogen

Episode features
- Chalkboard gag: "I will not do the Dirty Bird"
- Couch gag: The couch is sunk by an iceberg and only Maggie survives.
- Commentary: Matt Groening; Mike Scully; George Meyer; Tom Martin; Matt Selman; Steven Dean Moore

Episode chronology
← Previous "Wild Barts Can't Be Broken"	Next → "Homer to the Max"
- The Simpsons season 10

"Sunday, Cruddy Sunday" is the twelfth episode of the tenth season of the American animated television series The Simpsons. It first aired on Fox in the United States on January 31, 1999, just after Super Bowl XXXIII Sunday. In the episode, while buying new tires for his car, Homer meets a travel agent called Wally Kogen. After becoming friends, Kogen offers Homer a free bus ride to the Super Bowl, as long as he can find enough people to fill Kogen's bus. Several people, including Bart, tag along on what soon becomes a problematic trip. Meanwhile, Marge and Lisa set out to find the missing parts of "Vincent Price's Egg Magic", a celebrity-endorsed craft kit.

"Sunday, Cruddy Sunday" was directed by Steven Dean Moore and written by George Meyer, Brian Scully, Mike Scully and Tom Martin, the first credit Martin received for the series. Mike Scully jokingly said that the episode was "thrown together[...] without thought or structure" by the writers. For the subplot, the writers tried to come up with the "most boring thing" Lisa and Marge could do to pass time. The episode features several guest-stars, including comedian Fred Willard, country singer Dolly Parton, Fox CEO Rupert Murdoch, sports commentators Pat Summerall and John Madden, and former American football players Troy Aikman, Rosey Grier and Dan Marino. All guest-stars played themselves, except for Willard who portrayed Kogen. The episode pokes fun at folk singer Burl Ives, former United States president Bill Clinton as well as the series' fans, among other things.

In its original broadcast, the episode was seen by approximately 11.5 million viewers, making it the tenth most watched program of the week as well as the second most watched scripted program on the network the night it aired. The episode was released on home video for the first time in 2004, and in 2007, the episode was again released as part of the DVD set The Simpsons – The Complete Tenth Season. Following its broadcast, the episode received mostly positive reviews from critics.

After its original broadcast, however, a scene in the episode involving a fictitious, sexually suggestive Super Bowl commercial for the Catholic Church became the subject of controversy. The scene garnered scrutiny from the American Catholic anti-defamation and civil rights organization The Catholic League, whose members sent hundreds of angry letters to the Fox network, demanding any mention of Catholicism in the episode be excised. In September the same year, when the episode was supposed to repeat, the Catholic League asked Fox if they could censor the scene, which the network agreed to. Their decision, however, was criticized by journalists and staff members. The censored version of the episode is still in syndication, as well as on Disney+.

== Plot ==
When Bart, Lisa and the students of Springfield Elementary go on a field trip to the post office, Bart gets a coupon book as a souvenir, which he gives to Homer as a birthday present. Homer uses one of his coupons for a free wheel balancing at a tire shop, but is conned into buying four new tires for his car. While waiting for the installation, Homer meets Wally Kogen, a travel agent. The two watch a special on the Super Bowl while drinking at Moe's, and Wally explains that his agency is sending a charter bus to the game. To get free seats for himself and Bart, Homer helps Wally fill the bus by persuading many prominent male citizens of Springfield to sign up.

Homer, Bart, and the men arrive at Miami's Pro Player Stadium for pre-game festivities, only to discover that Wally has bought counterfeit tickets. They try to sneak in, but are caught and detained in a cell, where they vent their frustration on Homer by using him as a substitute for the opening kick ceremony. After Dolly Parton—a friend of Wally's and one of the halftime entertainers—breaks them out, they make their way into a skybox suite and spend more time gorging themselves on free food and drinks than they do watching the game.

Confronted by the box's owner, Rupert Murdoch, the group flees toward the field but is promptly swept into the locker room by the victorious Denver Broncos whom they have triumphed over their rival team, the Atlanta Falcons. They share in the celebration, with Homer taking a congratulatory phone call from President Bill Clinton, and several of the men wind up with Super Bowl rings as they board the bus to return to Springfield.

Meanwhile, Marge and Lisa find a 1960s-era egg decorating kit endorsed by Vincent Price and decide to use it. When the kit proves to have no feet for the egg, Marge calls the company's help line and finds herself listening to Price on a voice mail greeting. As Homer's group leaves Miami, Pat Summerall and John Madden analyze the events of the episode, their initially favorable opinion quickly souring. They board a bus driven by Price, who has trouble shifting gears properly.

== Production ==
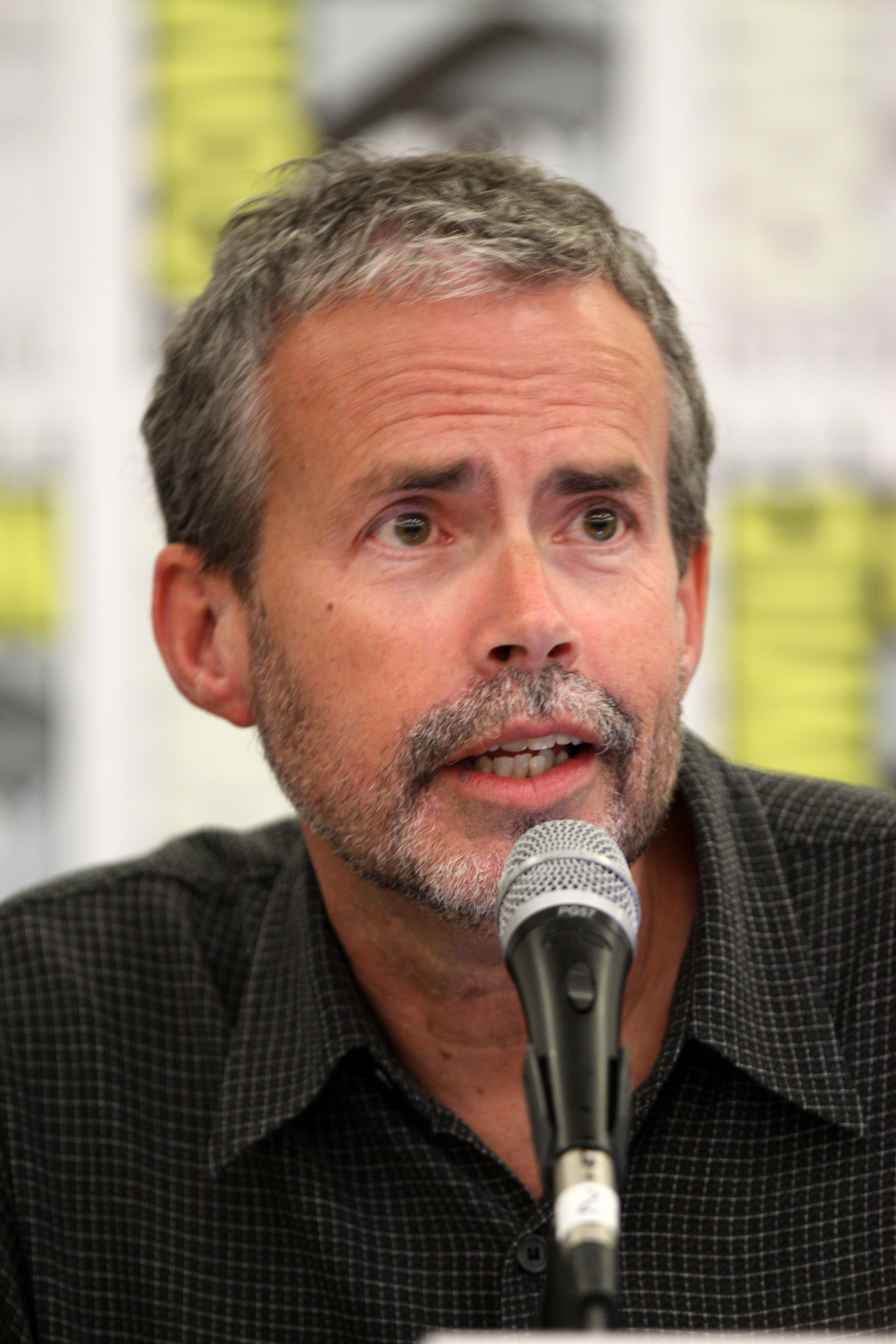
Mike Scully wrote the episode together with George Meyer, Tom Martin, and Brian Scully.

"Sunday, Cruddy Sunday" was directed by Steven Dean Moore and co-written by former staff writers Tom Martin, George Meyer, Brian Scully, and executive producer and former showrunner Mike Scully. It was first broadcast on the Fox network in the United States on January 31, 1999, right after Super Bowl XXXIII and the premiere of Family Guy. "Sunday, Cruddy Sunday" was the first episode for which Martin received a writing credit, and in the DVD audio commentary for the episode, he stated that he "loved" writing the episode. The writing process for the episode was "kind of unusual", since the writers "threw it [the episode] together" without, Scully quipped, thinking of "things such as thought and structure". A scene in the episode shows Homer buying new tires for his car. The scene was written by Brian Scully, who had been scammed by a Firestone Tire and Rubber Company dealer. The episode's subplot was the result of the Simpsons writers trying to find activities for Marge and Lisa to participate in while Bart and Homer were at the Super Bowl. According to Martin, the writers were trying to come up with "the most boring thing" Marge and Lisa could do to pass time. After hearing cast member Dan Castellaneta's impression of Vincent Price, the writers found the impression to be so funny that they based the subplot on the fictional crafts set "Vincent Price's Egg Magic".

In a scene in the episode, Homer and Kogen are in Moe's tavern, discussing their favorite football teams with Moe. When Moe mentions that his favorite team is the Atlanta Falcons, he holds a glass in front of his mouth, obscuring his lip movements. He then passes the same glass to Homer, who does the same for the Denver Broncos. Originally, the characters would be saying something else, however, because the staff wanted the episode to be "current", new dialogue was recorded for the scene. Because there was no time to animate the scene from scratch, the staff simply made the characters hold a glass in front of their mouths while saying their lines. This technique was also used in reference to the ongoing impeachment scandal, as when the characters mention that the President and First Lady will be watching, they cover their mouths when naming them. The song that plays during the bus trip to the Super Bowl was performed by NRBQ. The episode also features British rock band Blur's "Song 2", which plays during the "race" to the stadium.

The episode features American comedian Fred Willard as Wally Kogen. Scully stated that, for many years, the Simpsons staff had wanted Willard to guest-star in an episode, and that they had been looking for a character for Willard to portray. Scully also stated that Willard was "great fun" to have on the show. Wally Kogen's name is taken from two former writers on The Simpsons; the character's first name, Wally, is taken from Wallace Wolodarsky, and the character's last name, Kogen, is taken from Jay Kogen. The episode also features former football players Rosey Grier, Troy Aikman and Dan Marino as themselves. Scully stated that, when athletes guest-star in television shows, their performances are "not always the greatest", however, he asserted, Aikman, Grier, and Marino were all "really funny" and "did a great job". Country singer Dolly Parton guest-starred as herself as well. Scully stated that he was "shocked" by how short Parton was; however, he added that she was "very nice" and "thrilled" to be in the episode. Also featured in the episode is Rupert Murdoch, creator of the Fox Broadcasting Company. Originally, the writers wanted Murdoch to be portrayed by Castellaneta (who had previously voiced Murdoch in the episode "Sideshow Bob's Last Gleaming"), the voice of Homer among other characters in the series. However, after a while, the writers decided to ask if Murdoch would guest-star as himself. Scully comments that the writers were "impressed" that Murdoch would introduce himself as a "billionaire tyrant" in the episode.

Former president Bill Clinton was parodied in the episode.

The episode pokes fun at U.S. President Bill Clinton. In their list 15 Simpsons Moments That Perfectly Captured Their Eras, Genevieve Koski, Josh Modell, Noel Murray, Sean O'Neal, Kyle Ryan, and Scott Tobias of The A.V. Club wrote "By the time this episode aired [...], the nation had endured more than a year of the Lewinsky scandal. The episode debuted a month after the House impeached Clinton, but less than two weeks before the Senate's impeach/acquit vote, so an air of uncertainty lingered over an otherwise lightweight episode about Homer organizing a Super Bowl trip." Wally covers his mouth with a glass when he mentions the names of Bill and Hillary, who he hears will be watching the Super Bowl. In a scene in the episode, Clinton calls to congratulate the Super Bowl victors from the Oval Office, but is distracted by Al Gore measuring a window. As Scully recalls, at the time, the Simpsons writers were confident Gore would win the 2000 presidential election, which eventually was marginally, and controversially, won by George W. Bush.

The episode also comments on the series' fanbase. Near the end of the episode, Madden and Summerall provide the following analysis:

SUMMERALL: Well John, what did you think of tonight's episode?

MADDEN: I loved it! The last-minute addition of Wally Kogen to the line-up was a bit of a gamble, but it really paid off.

SUMMERALL: Marge and Lisa painting eggs? Did that work for you?

MADDEN: Ho, ho, big time! They came off the bench with a huge effort that allowed Homer and Bart to make some significant gains.

SUMMERALL: Did it strike you as odd that in a Super Bowl show with Dolly Parton we didn't see any football or singing?

MADDEN: I hadn't thought about it, Pat, but in retrospect, it was kind of a rip-off! What a way to treat the loyal fans, who put up with so much nonsense from this franchise.

SUMMERALL: Any final thoughts?

MADDEN: Nah, I'm too mad, let's get the heck out of here!

In his book Leaving Springfield, John Alberti writes about the exchange: "This conversation begins with conventional football game patter used to comment on the episode, but then takes an abrupt turn when Madden realizes, in spite of the humor, that the episode did not live up to expectations (which he has not originally noticed)."

The episode title is a reference to the film Sunday Bloody Sunday (1971), and perhaps the U2 song of the same name. The couch gag is a reference to James Cameron's 1997 film Titanic. The beginning of the episode shows Bart's grade visiting a post office. Their tour guide is modeled after American actor and folk singer Burl Ives, of whom director Moore is a fan. "Vincent Price's Egg Magic" is a parody on celebrity-endorsed craft kits which were popular during the 1960s and which, according to Meyer, do not exist anymore. The decision to have Price endorse an egg crafts product is based on Price's role as Egghead in the 1960s series Batman. The sequence featuring a man called Rudy being refused entry to the group's bus because he is "too small to go to the Super Bowl" is a reference to the 1993 film Rudy about football player Rudy Ruettiger; Rudy also implies the he is rather obnoxious, telling the people on the bus "What I lack in size, I make up for in obnoxiousness!" Dolly Parton says she will be joined by actor Rob Lowe and dance group Stomp for her performance during the Super Bowl halftime show, while the Super Bowl features a booth called "Take a Leak with NFL Greats"; the players shown participating are Ricky Watters and Jim Plunkett.

== Release and reception ==
=== Broadcast and re-releases ===
In its original American broadcast on January 31, 1999, "Sunday, Cruddy Sunday" received an 11.6 rating, meaning it was seen by approximately 11.5 million viewers. It finished in 10th place in the ratings for the week of January 25–31, 1999, making it the second most watched scripted program on Fox, after the premiere of Family Guy. On September 14, 2004, "Sunday, Cruddy Sunday", along with the season 1 episode "Homer's Night Out", the season 11 episode "The Mansion Family" and the season 13 episode "Homer the Moe", were released on a DVD set called The Simpsons – Gone Wild. On August 7, 2007, "Sunday, Cruddy Sunday" was again released as part of The Simpsons – The Complete Tenth Season DVD box set. Matt Groening, Mike Scully, George Meyer, Tom Martin, Matt Selman and Steven Dean Moore participated in the DVD's audio commentary of the episode.

=== Controversy ===
==== Background ====
After the episode aired, Fox received hundreds of letters from Catholics who were concerned about the mention of the Catholic Church in the Super Bowl commercial. Shown here is a still from the controversial scene.

The beginning of the episode's third act shows Marge and Lisa watching a Super Bowl commercial. In his book The Gospel According to The Simpsons, Mark I. Pinsky described the commercial:

A car pulls into a windblown gas station in the middle of nowhere. The driver gets out and, seeing no one, honks the horn for service. Out of the station file three buxom, scantily clad young women provide 'service.' One lifts the hood suggestively while another slides the gas pump nozzle into the tank in an image too obvious to ignore, but the driver's eyes are riveted to a shiny cross dangling from one woman's quivering cleavage as the rock music soars. What is this all about? The voice-over explains: 'The Catholic Church: We've made a few... changes.'

The scene was inspired by real-life Super Bowl commercials in which, according to Scully, "you don't know what the product is" because there is "so much going on". It was also based on the 1983 music video for the American rock band ZZ Top's "Gimme All Your Lovin'". Although they had come up with the commercial's premise, they were not sure of what its tagline would be. Eventually, Martin, one of the episode writers, suggested "The Catholic Church... we've made a few changes." It got the biggest laugh from the other writers and was subsequently included in the episode.

The scene garnered scrutiny from members of The Catholic League, a self-appointed organization that is not, despite its name, affiliated with the Catholic Church. The league had criticized The Simpsons' depiction of Catholicism before, namely in the episode "Lisa Gets an 'A'", which aired the year before. The scene included an exchange between Bart and Marge that the League felt was hurtful to Catholics. William A. Donohue, the president of the league, wrote Fox a letter asking them to explain why the dialogue was in the show. After failing to receive an answer several times, Donohue was at last given a reply written by Thomas Chavez, manager for broadcast standards and practices. The league were not satisfied with Chavez' answer. After "Sunday, Cruddy Sunday" aired, the Catholic League issued an article in their news magazine Catalyst. In it, they mentioned the scene in "Lisa Gets an 'A'", and wrote that The Simpsons had "struck again, big time" with the Super Bowl commercial in "Sunday, Cruddy Sunday". They wrote that they had sent a complaint to Chavez regarding the scene, and encouraged others to do the same; "We wrote to Mr. Chavez again, but we also told him that he'd be hearing from you, too. So don't disappoint us."

==== Censorship ====
Following the episode's broadcast, the Fox network received several angry letters and emails from concerned Catholics, who were uneasy with the commercial scene. According to Scully, the letters were worded the same, and all started with "My family and I have always enjoyed The Simpsons, until last night..." Nevertheless, the letters provoked a reaction from The Simpsons staff, and in an interview, Scully said, "We got a couple of hundred letters, and it was very obvious from reading a majority of them that [the Catholic letter writers] had not seen the show. Some of them were from third-graders, all saying the same thing: 'Please don't make fun of my religion.' Which we all know third-graders are very adamant about."

Several months later, the Catholic League contacted Fox again, asking that the word "Catholic" be excised from the voice-over when the episode repeated in September 1999 on the network, as well as in its subsequent syndicated airings. The network agreed, and Roland MacFarland, Fox's vice president of broadcast standards, ordered Scully to cut the word from the episode or eliminate all reference to religion. Scully refused, and after a long argument, MacFarland offered to replace the protesting denomination with a Protestant substitute – Methodist, Presbyterians or Baptists. Scully then asked MacFarland "What would be the difference changing it to another religion, and wouldn't that just be offending a different group of people?", to which MacFarland replied that Fox had already had trouble with the Catholics earlier that season.

Following the complaints, Fox removed any mention of Catholicism from the scene, resulting in the line "The church..." Scully was reportedly furious with Fox's actions. In an interview in Los Angeles Times, Scully said, "people can say hurtful things to each other about their weight, their race, their intelligence, their sexual preference, and that all seems up for grabs, but when you get into religion, some people get very nervous." Marisa Guthrie of Boston Herald also criticized the network, describing it as "caving in" to the Catholic League's protests. She wrote, "Hollywood has always been gun shy of controversy, but recent displays of self-censorship on the part of entertainment industry executives make us cringe [...] Granted Catholics, as a group have endured an ample amount of bashing, but The Simpsons is an equal opportunity offender." Howard Rosenberg, a writer for Los Angeles Times, criticized Fox's actions as well. He argued that the network had a biased opinion towards Catholicism and that, had the scene mentioned a different religion, it would have been accepted. He also wrote, "Given its famous flaunting of sleaze and death-defying motorcycle leaps, the big news here is that Fox has standards. Its latest production is Censors Who Kill Jokes."

In an issue of Catalyst, the Catholic League responded to Rosenberg's article. They argued that Rosenberg was biased against Catholics, in that he was content with the series lampooning Catholicism, but not other religions.

The controversy surrounding the scene has since been referenced in later episodes of the series. While the censored version of "Sunday, Cruddy Sunday" is still in syndication in the US, as well as on Disney+ internationally, it was left uncensored on The Simpsons – The Complete Tenth Season DVD box set.

=== Critical reviews ===
Following its broadcast, "Sunday, Cruddy Sunday" received mostly positive reviews from critics. In his review of The Simpsons – Gone Wild DVD set, David Packard of DVD Verdict wrote: "This episode has always been one of my favorites, and while the following episode ["The Mansion Family"] is a nice inclusion as well, this episode is the best on the disc. The hilarious gags come at a slam-bang pace, and they're occasionally edgy." He especially liked the set-piece in the post office, as well as the Super Bowl commercial. Warren Martyn and Adrian Wood of I Can't Believe It's a Bigger and Better Updated Unofficial Simpsons Guide called the episode "A thoroughly enjoyable romp through what happens when a bunch of lads go for a Sunday out at the ball game." They enjoyed the guest-stars, writing "both Dolly Parton and, bizarrely, Rupert Murdoch – spice things up nicely", however they were most fond of Fred Willard as Wally Kogen. "A shame he doesn't join our regulars", they wrote. James Plath of DVD Town wrote that the episode is "funny," and Ian Jane of DVD Talk found the episode "amusing". The Orlando Sentinel's Gregory Hardy named it the third best episode of the show with a sports theme. Phillip Stephenson of Pittsburgh Post-Gazette called the episode "classic", and Susan Dunne of The Hartford Courant described it as "debauched but hilarious". The Cincinnati Post's Greg Paeth noted that the episode is a critical favorite.

On the other hand, Colin Jacobson of DVD Movie Guide gave the episode a more mixed review. He wrote: "Like most guest star-ridden episodes, this one gets a bit gimmicky to fit in all the cameos." He found the self-referential ending "fails to become clever and instead just seems silly." However, he wrote that the episode "includes a few goods bits, especially the phone call in which Homer convinces Lenny to go to the game." Jake McNeill of Digital Entertainment News wrote that the episode is "so jam-packed with guest celebrity voices that they ran out of room for a plot. Or humor." Chris Barsanti of Filmcritic.com gave a negative review as well, and wrote that the episode is "lost amid a flurry of celebrity walk-ons and lazy jokes."
