= Talking Tom & Friends (TV series) =

Animated children's comedy web series

- Genre: Comedy; Animated sitcom; Surreal comedy
- Created by: Outfit7
- Based on: Talking Tom & Friends by Outfit7
- Developed by: Boris Dolenc; Samo Login; Tom Martin
- Voices of: Colin Hanks; James Adomian; Tom Kenny; Lisa Schwartz; Maria Bamford
- Composers: Thomas Kathriner; Micheal Shawn Lyon
- Countries of origin: Slovenia; Austria (seasons 1-3); Spain (seasons 4-5)
- Original language: English
- No. of seasons: 5
- No. of episodes: 156 (+ pilot) (list of episodes)

Production
- Executive producers: Samo Login; Boris Dolenc; Kris Staber and Dunja Bernatzky (ARX Anima)
- Running time: 11 minutes
- Production companies: Outfit7; ARX Anima (seasons 1-3); People Moving Pixels (seasons 4-5)

Original release
- Network: YouTube
- Release: 23 December 2014 – 24 December 2021

Related
- Talking Friends; Talking Tom Shorts; Talking Tom and Friends Minis; Talking Tom Heroes

Talking Tom & Friends (previously Talking Tom and Friends) is a children's animated web and comedy television series by Slovenian company Outfit7, based on the Video game franchise of the same name. Its premiere release was on 23 December 2014 on YouTube, with the final episode being released on 24 December 2021. The first three seasons of the show were animated and co-produced by the Austrian company ARX Anima, while seasons 4 and 5 were animated and co-produced by the Spanish animation studio People Moving Pixels.

The former logo of the TV show, replaced during season 5

== Episodes ==
Season	Episodes	Originally released	
Season	Episodes	First released	Last released
Pilot		23 December 2014	
1	51	30 April 2015	22 December 2016
2	26	15 June 2017	8 March 2018
3	26	12 May 2018	27 December 2018
4	26	16 May 2019	27 March 2020
5	26	8 May 2020	24 December 2021
Minisodes	8	5 February 2015	4 February 2016

== Characters ==
=== Main ===
- Thomas "Tom" (voiced by Colin Hanks) – A grey tabby cat who creates ideas for new apps and inventions for the company and prefers to be on the business side of things. Tom was also mayor starting from season 2 up until season 4. Hanks describes Talking Tom as mischievous, charismatic, and energetic; he is also the leader of his gang who likes to have fun. At times, he is also shown to be irresponsible, and usually ends up in trouble due to this.
- Benjamin "Ben" (voiced by James Adomian) – A tan dog, Tom's best friend and business partner, who likes to invent things and work on apps, focusing on its technical aspects such as computer programming. Adomian describes Talking Ben as the brains of the group and a very serious individual, who nevertheless freaks out a lot. In the final episode of season 3, he was banned from using tech by his girlfriend Xenon, who was shown to be working for an agency. After he broke the rule, he was given an electronic bracelet (in "Where's Angela?") that would stop him from using tech. However, Ben later managed to get rid of the bracelet (in "Space Rescue").
- Angela (voiced by Lisa Schwartz) – A white cat and Tom's girlfriend, starting from the final episode of season 1, who aspires to be a singer, eventually becoming a famous singer in season 4, but tries her hand in other things also like scarves, smoothies, etc. Schwartz describes her as "super fun and girly", and sometimes shy, while outgoing at other times.
- Ginger (voiced by Maria Bamford) – A young orange-and-white cat and Tom's neighbour (in Talking Friends, he is Tom's nephew. However, he is not shown to be related to Tom in any way in this show). In season 1, he claims to be from the second-richest family in town. His parents do not spend much time with him, so he does not recognize love, and when Tom and Angela hold hands, dance or kiss, he calls it disgusting, but this can also be attributed to him being immature.
- Hank (voiced by Tom Kenny) – A white dog with a blue spot around his left eye and blue paws and Tom's roommate who enjoys television shows, often claiming to be "in a relationship with the TV". Kenny describes Hank as his sweet spot of doing nice and "stupid" characters.

=== Recurring ===
- Becca Sparkles (voiced by Maria Bamford) – A grey rabbit who initially made a diss track about Angela called "Little Miss Perfect", and acted rudely to Angela until she found out that her disliking Angela was because of a misunderstanding. Later on, she was accused by Angela of having a crush on Tom, but revealed that she had a crush on Hank. She and Hank start dating but later become just friends when Becca realises that Hank isn't ready for a relationship. In "The New Old Roommate", Becca moves into Angela's previously-haunted apartment.
- Roy Rakoon (voiced by Tom Kenny) – Tom's new neighbour, a raccoon who initially appears to be a rich, cool philanthropist but becomes Tom's rival and is shown to be a manipulative criminal. He is the main antagonist of the fifth season.
- Santa Claus (voiced by Tom Kenny) – An imaginary figure, shown to be a real figure in the show, who shows up in Christmas-themed episodes of the show.
- Dr. Internet Doctor (voiced by Brian Stack) – A medical doctor who runs his practice through web cams. He sometimes pretends to work in other related professions such as being an online therapist. His doctoring skills aren't very legitimate.
- The CEO (voiced by Brian Stack) – A rich businessman with whom Tom and his friends occasionally cross paths. His given name is Carl and believes that "CEO" stands for "Chief Everything Officer". Starting in the second season, he has a larger role as a rival intent on finding ways to steal Tom and Ben's inventions or to shut down their company. In later episodes, he even goes as far as trying to kill Tom. In season 4, he goes on a long vacation and leaves his pet goldfish, Goldie, in charge of the company.
- Jeremy the Germ (voiced by Josh Fadem in seasons 1–3 and Tom Kenny in seasons 4–5) – A blue blob-like germ that was a former antagonist but later reformed. Although appearing to be cute and sociable, he desired to make everyone sick. At the end of season 3, Jeremy moves into the garage due to a deal he made with Tom in which he would get rid of "Zappers" which had escaped from a video game and entered the real world. In season 4, he changes his evil ways, becomes clean, and joins the rest of the gang. In the later episodes, he is revealed to have a brother named Nigel, who tries to make Jeremy evil again, but fails. Later, he lands a job in the diner and leaves to pursue his passion.
- The Landlord (voiced by Dave Willis) – Tom and Hank's landlord, who rents out his garage to them. He dislikes excessive noise and often threatens to evict his tenants if they do anything he dislikes or fail to pay their rent. He is a former ping pong champion. Hank shows deference around him, often using royal vocabulary whenever he appears, annoying the Landlord.
- MC (voiced by James Adomian) – An event organiser and host who wears a helmet showing a pixelated display of a face and wears a jersey. In "The Sixth Friend", he reveals his name is Maurice Claremont.
- Rhonda (voiced by Lisa Schwartz) – The waitress and owner of the diner which is often visited by Tom and his friends. In "Waitress Angela", it is revealed that the Landlord owns her diner's building as well.
- Victoria Payne (voiced by Suzi Barrett) – A music critic known for being really harsh on upcoming singers. She hosts a show where she gives the singers a thumbs up or thumbs down. She is later shown to be enemies with Angela, MC and Ricky DeLuna.
- Darren (voiced by George Back) – A rich kid who is initially shown to be a snobbish rival to Ginger at a tennis tournament. He is later revealed to be the nephew of the CEO. He acts in a snobbish manner around Ginger and the gang, and is later shown to be secretively wishing to become the CEO's heir, often accidentally referring to the CEO as "my inheritance" when the CEO is in danger.
- Will Zee (voiced by Brandon Johnson) – A childhood friend of Tom. Initially a nerdy boy, Will has become a popular professional skateboarder who the gang admires, making Tom jealous at first.
- Boomerang (voiced by Tom Kenny) – An artificial intelligence program that Ben fashioned from an old tablet. He considers Ben to be his father, and quickly progresses through childhood and adolescence, but becomes so advanced that the computer he is in can no longer run him. Being left with no choice, Ben releases him into the Internet.
- Xenon (voiced by Robin Reed) – A nerdy girl who is initially shown to be working at an electronics store, who becomes Ben's girlfriend. She and Ben regularly chat using webcams; throughout season 2, she remotely controls a robot that holds the tablet Ben uses to communicate with her. Starting from the final episode of season 3, she is shown to be working for a mysterious organization referred to as "the Agency". She and Ben get along again after Ben discovers that Xenon actually wants to help the gang.
- Mel (voiced by Tom Kenny) and Flo (voiced by Maria Bamford) – Members of the "S.M.A.R.T.I.E.S." (The Super Mentally Advanced Really Truly Intellectually Endowed Society). Mel and Flo both have white hair and generally wear white lab coats and black-framed glasses. After Ben quit the S.M.A.R.T.I.E.S. because Mel and Flo were mocking his friends, they began to act rudely to Ben and claimed that Ben quit their club because "he was a failure".
- Ms. Vanthrax (voiced by Laraine Newman) – Ginger's school teacher, who also used to teach Tom and Ben. She enjoys creating new kinds of punishments for her students. In a later episode, she and the Landlord fall in love after Tom and the gang try to bring them together so that the Landlord does not sell the garage. In season 4, she is revealed to be a monster hunter.
- Ricky DeLuna (voiced by Carlos Alazraqui) – A famous actor and dancer, who initially is shown as the host of a talent show. In a later episode, Ricky tries to steal Angela away from Tom during a music video they were doing together, but fails. In season 4, he uses a music concert as a ruse to get rid of MC, Victoria Payne and Angela, but is caught and arrested.
- Ronnie (voiced by James Adomian) – A scout-mate and classmate of Ginger. He has brown curly hair and wears large round glasses. He is an expert at the SquareStack video game.
- Autumn Summers (voiced by Greg Manwaring in season 1 and Maria Bamford in seasons 3–5) – A fashion company executive, who is the host of most fashion shows, and with whom Tom and Angela cross paths occasionally. In season 4, she hires Tom as a model, and fires him for leaving the stage to save Ginger.
- Bongo (voiced by Tom Kenny) and McGillicuddy (voiced by James Adomian) – The protagonists of Hank's favorite TV show, named "Bongo and McGillicuddy". Bongo is a human police officer and McGillicuddy is his assistant, an orangutan. They occasionally interact with Hank when either Hank enters their world or when they enter Hank's world. In their first appearance, it is shown that they watch "Talking Tom & Friends" as a show.

== Production ==
On 7 October 2013, Outfit7 announced that they had hired American animation writer Joe Ansolabehere to create a 52 x 11-minute CGI comedy TV series based on the Talking Tom & Friends franchise, under the name of Tom on the Road. The series was to star Tom, Ben, Angela, and Ginger, and was to premiere by the end of 2014. On 3 March 2014, Kidscreen Magazine announced that the series would go by the name of Talking Tom and Friends, and instead be produced by BRB International's creative studio Screen 21. The first three seasons ended up being co-developed, produced and animated with the European animation studio ARX Anima.

On 23 February 2015, Outfit7 announced that the full series was to premiere on 30 April with new episodes launching weekly. It won Best Animated Series at the 2016 Cablefax Awards and so, on 29 August 2016, the show was greenlit for a second season with another 52 episodes, but the final product only had 26 episodes, with the remaining episodes becoming season 3.

In 2018, Outfit7 Limited moved co-development, production and animation starting with season 4 to the Spanish animation studio People Moving Pixels, causing the animation style to change and the main characters to be featured in clothes. At the time of the move, Stefan Fjeldmark announced that seasons 4 and 5 would be made at the same time, for a total of 52 episodes.

== Broadcast and release ==
The series was released on YouTube. It was also broadcast on Boomerang UK, which began in September 2016, and Pop for the fifth season. It was released on Netflix as well, but has since been discontinued. The series also aired on Cartoon Network internationally.

== Reception and accolades ==
The show is rated three stars out of five by Common Sense Media, which says that "Talking Tom & Friends centers on the animated stars of a popular app series, so kids who know and love them will want to watch their TV antics. On the whole, the content is fine for kids, and there's plenty of silliness (and some body noises and humor) to keep them entertained. That's the show's main intent, so don't expect many teaching moments. The characters argue and get on each other's nerves at times, and some squabbles get physical with tussles and wrestling, but there are no injuries."

In 2016, the show won the Cablefax Program Awards for Best Animated Series. The show is available on YouTube, where the show's official channel has 16.2 million subscribers and 7.1 billion views as of May 2026.
