= Tom Martin (writer) =

American television writer (born 1964)

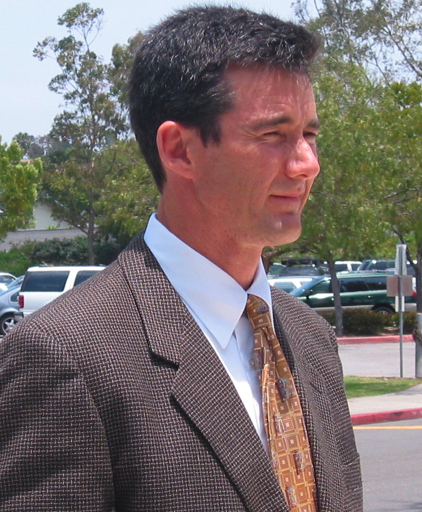
- Tom Martin
- Born: Thomas Joseph Martin
- Occupation: Television writer

Thomas Joseph Martin is an American television writer. He grew up in Southern California and attended Rolling Hills High School and Indio High School. He graduated from University of California, Irvine in 1987 with degrees in Economics and Political Science. While at UC Irvine he ran on the Track and Cross Country teams. He has written for Saturday Night Live (as a guest writer), The Simpsons, The Naked Truth, Just Shoot Me!, Clone High, WordGirl, and is a former standup comedian. He co-created Talking Tom and Friends, and is currently executive producer on the Clash of Clans inspired series Clash-a-Rama!.

== Early life and education ==
Martin earned a Bachelor of Arts in Economics and a Bachelor of Arts in Political Science from the University of California, Irvine in 1987, he was among three members of the UCI Comedy Club selected to open for Jay Leno at the Bren Events Center in February 1988. During his college years, he was also active in athletics, competing in events such as the 3,000-meter steeplechase.

By 1988, he had performed about 20 times, including a paid set at the Ice House in Pasadena.

== Career ==
After graduation, Martin briefly worked in business before turning to comedy full time, supporting himself by substitute teaching while performing in the evenings. He became a regular at the Laff Stop in Newport Beach and by the late 1980s had secured spots at the Improv comedy clubs, marking his transition from opening act to feature performer.

=== Television ===
Martin began his television career as a guest writer for Saturday Night Live in 1996 and a staff writer for Just Shoot Me in 1997. He went on to work as a story editor for The Naked Truth and contributed to various network sitcoms before transitioning into animation.

He wrote and supervised for several seasons of The Simpsons (1999–2001), winning two Emmy Awards for Outstanding Animated Program. In 2002, he served as a writer and supervising producer on Clone High, USA for MTV.

His television credits include work as a writer and supervising producer on Nikki (2001) and Still Standing (2003–2004), head writer for The Showbiz Show with David Spade (2005–2006), and head writer for the PBS animated series WordGirl (2008–2011, 2013–2014). He also served as story editor for Disney XD's Randy Cunningham: 9th Grade Ninja (2012–2013), head writer and co-creator of Talking Tom and Friends (2014–2016), and executive producer and voice director for Clash-a-Rama! (2017–2019).

=== Television Films and Features ===
In addition to series work, Martin has written and contributed to a number of television films and animated features, including It's a Very Merry Muppet Christmas Movie (2002), The Muppet Wizard of Oz (2005), The Year Without a Santa Claus (2006), and Unstable Fables: Tortoise vs. Hare (2007). He has also provided uncredited punch-up writing for feature films such as The Cable Guy and Whistleblower, and received a special thanks credit for The Boxtrolls.

== Writing credits ==
=== The Simpsons ===
- "Sunday, Cruddy Sunday" (1999, with George Meyer, Brian Scully, and Mike Scully)
- "Grift of the Magi" (1999)
- "Pokey Mom" (2001)

=== Clone High ===
- "A.D.D.: The Last 'D' is for Disorder" (2002)
- "Plane Crazy: Gate Expectations" (2002)

=== Talking Tom & Friends ===
- 2014 - 2018

=== Movies ===
- It's a Very Merry Muppet Christmas Movie (2002, with Jim Lewis)
- The Muppets' Wizard of Oz (2005, Screenplay, with Debra Frank, Steve Hayes, and Adam F. Goldberg)
