= Pay Day =

A pay day or payday is a specified day of the week or month when one is paid, usually workers collecting wages from their employers.

Pay Day, PayDay or Payday may also refer to:

== Arts, entertainment, and media ==
=== Films ===
- Pay Day (1918 film), a film by Sidney Drew
- Pay Day (1922 film), a film by Charlie Chaplin
- Payday (1944 film), a short film
- Payday (1972 film), a film directed by Daryl Duke and written by Don Carpenter
- Payday (2018 film), a Nigerian comedy drama film

=== Games ===
- Pay Day (board game), a board game by Parker Brothers
- Payday (video game series), a video game series by Overkil Software and Starbreeze Studios
  - Payday: The Heist (2011)
  - Payday 2 (2013)
  - Payday 3 (2023)

=== Music ===
- Payday (album), solo album by Lil' Fizz
- "Payday", song by Alesso made for the game Payday 2
- "Payday", song by Jesse Winchester covered by Elvis Costello on Kojak Variety
- "Payday", song by Doja Cat from her 2021 album Planet Her

=== Television ===
- Payday (Canadian TV series) (1973–1974), a television series
- "Payday" (M*A*S*H), a third-season episode of M*A*S*H
- Payday (American TV series), a 2016 TV series on Vice

== Other uses ==
- Payday (confection), also styled PAYDAY and PayDay, a brand of candy bar made by Hershey Foods Corporation
