= Gustaf Grefberg =

Swedish musician

- Born: February 18, 1974 (age 52); Sweden
- Genres: Tracker music, pop
- Occupation: Video game soundtrack composer
- Formerly of: Triton

Gustaf Grefberg (born 18 February 1974) is a Swedish musician and video game composer. Within the demoscene, he is known under the artist name Lizardking, and much of his production consists of tracker music. He is or has been a member of the demo groups Alcatraz, The Silents, Razor 1911, The Black Lotus and Triton.

Grefberg became one of the most widely recognized Scandinavian tracker musicians during the 1990s, known for his melodic style and polished production techniques. Together with Joakim Falk (a.k.a. dLx), he invented a musical style called Doskpop, characterized by upbeat melodies, pop‑influenced harmonies and Amiga‑style sound design. He released several music disks such as Doskpop The Compilation and Memorial Songs 1+2, which helped popularize the style across the demoscene.

He also contributed to projects such as Merregnon and the Symphonic Game Music Concert series in Leipzig, Germany, where his work was performed alongside other European game composers.

In 1994, he released a compact cassette, Mindlitter, in cooperation with Martin Wall (a.k.a. Mantronix). Grefberg's songs appear on side A and Wall's on side B. The two sold the tapes in person at the Assembly '94 demo party.

Outside the demoscene, Grefberg is known for composing the score of several Starbreeze Studios video games, including Enclave, Knights of the Temple: Infernal Crusade, The Chronicles of Riddick: Escape from Butcher Bay, The Darkness and Brothers: A Tale of Two Sons.

His game audio work often combines electronic and orchestral elements, and he has served not only as composer but also as lead sound designer, contributing to cinematics, sound effects, voice direction and localization across multiple titles.

== Discography ==
- Physiology (1993)
- Mindlitter (1994)
- Fashion8 (1998)
- Audiophonik (1999)
- Merregnon Vol.1 (2001)
- Merregnon Vol.2 (2004)
- Born in the Stars (as Xain) (2004)
- Amiga Hits! (2015)
- Doskpop Zero (2025)

== Works ==
| Year | Title | Notes | Reference(s) |
|---|---|---|---|
| 2002 | Enclave | Soundtrack; Sound Effects (also localization and story writing) | |
| 2004 | Knights of the Temple: Infernal Crusade | Composer; Sound Designer (also localization manager) | |
| 2004 | The Chronicles of Riddick: Escape from Butcher Bay | Music; Lead Sound Designer; Cinematics Sound | |
| 2007 | The Darkness | Musical Score, Lead Sound Designer | |
| 2009 | The Chronicles of Riddick: Assault on Dark Athena | Music; Sound | |
| 2012 | Syndicate | Composer; Sound Designer | |
| 2013 | Brothers: A Tale of Two Sons | Original Score; Lead Sound Designer | |
| 2013 | Payday 2 | Additional Music | |
| 2014 | Wolfenstein: The New Order | Senior Sound Designer | |
| 2015 | Wolfenstein: The Old Blood | Sound Design (also Shambler Army VO) | |
| 2018 | A Way Out | Senior Sound Designer; Composer with Sam Hulick | |
| 2021 | It Takes Two | Composer with Kristofer Eng | |
| 2025 | Split Fiction | Composer with Jonatan Järpehag (also Additional VO) | |
