= Raid: World War II =

2017 video game

RAID: World War II
- Developer: Lion Game Lion
- Publisher: Starbreeze Studios (Note: Retail console release published by 505 Games.)
- Artist: Dinko Pavicic
- Composer: Ivan Selak
- Engine: Diesel Engine 2.0
- Platforms: Windows; PlayStation 4; Xbox One
- Release: Windows: WW: 26 September 2017; PlayStation 4, Xbox One: NA: 10 October 2017; PAL: 13 October 2017
- Genres: First-person shooter, tactical shooter
- Modes: Single-player, multiplayer

RAID: World War II is a multiplayer first-person shooter video game that lets players team up as the Raid crew and fight through events of World War II. The game was developed by Lion Game Lion and was published by Starbreeze Studios for Microsoft Windows.

== Synopsis ==
During World War II, the Nazis are on the verge of winning the war in Europe. Four prisoners of war – Sterling, Rivet, Kurgan and Wolfgang have been freed by "Mrs. White", a British Intelligence Operative, who needs someone to take down Hitler and Nazi Germany. Their objective is to fight the war without rules or mercy. Their reward is all the Nazi gold they can carry.

== Development ==
RAID: World War II was developed by Lion Game Lion, a Croatian Starbreeze partner studio, that has developed downloadable content for Payday 2. The team chose to work with Diesel, an engine made by Overkill Software (ex-Grin Studios), because they have an extensive experience on working with the engine. The game has a budget of US$8 million, financed by Starbreeze Studios.

== Reception ==
On Metacritic, it has an aggregate score of 53% on PC, 46% on PlayStation 4 and Xbox One. IGN gave the game a score of 5.0. PlayStation Lifestyle given a score of 5.5/10. Push Square rate 2/10. Game Informer given a score of 4 out of 10.
