= Lifetime Supply of Guilt =

Studio album by The Duskfall
- Released: August 12, 2005
- Recorded: April–May 2005
- Genre: Melodic death metal
- Length: 38:09
- Label: Nuclear Blast
- Producer: The Duskfall

The Duskfall chronology
| Source (2003) | Lifetime Supply of Guilt (2005) | The Dying Wonders of the World (2007) |

Professional ratings
Review scores
| Source | Rating |
|---|---|
| Blabbermouth | 6/10 stars |
| Rock Hard | 9.5/10 stars |
| Metal.de | 8/10 stars |
| Sea of Tranquility | 3/5 stars |

Lifetime Supply of Guilt is the third album by melodic death metal band The Duskfall. The album was the band's first release through Nuclear Blast.

== Track listing ==
1. "Trust Is Overrated" − 2:12
2. "The Shallow End" − 3:16
3. "Break the Pact" − 4:53
4. "A Stubborn Soul" − 4:12
5. "Shoot It In" − 3:21
6. "Going Down Screaming" − 4:49
7. "Hours Are Wasted" − 4:23
8. "Sympathy Has Decreased" − 4:57
9. "Downright Dreadful" − 3:35
10. "Relive Your Fall" − 2:31

== In media ==
- The music video for the song "Shoot It In" is featured in the video game The Darkness.
