= Overkill's The Walking Dead =

2018 video game

- Developer: Overkill Software
- Publisher: Starbreeze Publishing
- Artist: Joakim Ericsson
- Writer: Hampus Gross
- Composer: Gustavo Coutinho
- Series: The Walking Dead
- Engine: Unreal Engine 4
- Platform: Windows
- Release: November 6, 2018
- Genres: First-person shooter, survival horror
- Modes: Single-player, multiplayer

Overkill's The Walking Dead is a first-person shooter developed by Overkill Software and published by Starbreeze Studios and 505 Games. The title, based on the comics of The Walking Dead, has a strong emphasis on cooperative gameplay. The game was released worldwide for Windows in November 2018. On 26 February 2019, development on the game ceased and all console ports were cancelled. Critical reception of the game was mixed, and it was a commercial failure.

== Gameplay ==
Overkill's The Walking Dead is a first-person shooter with an emphasis on cooperative gameplay. The game features four characters, namely Maya, Aidan, Grant, and Heather. Each has their own unique skills and abilities, and players must work together in order to complete their objectives. Set in Washington D.C., a post-apocalyptic environment which was overran by zombies, the game features stealth, survival horror and role-playing elements.

== Plot ==
In a post-apocalyptic Washington, D.C., Anderson Banks attempts suicide after losing his wife and daughter. However, Heather Campbell saves him. The two form a close bond, later establishing Camp Anderson in Georgetown. Sometime after, Camp Anderson is raided by a hostile group called The Family, who kill several of their members and steal their supplies, including a water purifier. Anderson orders Heather and a small group of survivors—Grant Moore, Maya Evans, and Aidan Hunt—to retrieve the purifier from the Family's base.

The group infiltrates the base and takes back the purifier. However, a guard notices them and sounds the alarm. Grant destroys a gatelock, causing walkers to invade. They kill several of the guards and escape amidst the chaos. Pursued by a horde of walkers, Heather fires a flare, and they are picked up by Caleb Bernard. The Family stages a surprise retaliation attack on Camp Anderson, but are fended off. Heather suggests they steal a radio to listen in on the Family's plans. Heather, Grant, Aidan, and Maya sneak into a Family outpost in West End, later gaining intel on suspicious activity from the Family's main base, a former shopping mall in Foggy Bottom.

The group goes to the mall and encounters hostile soldiers from another group called the Brigade. They kill the soldiers and rescue Reina, the Family's leader. Back at Camp Anderson, Reina reveals that the Brigade has been extorting the Family, which is why they attacked Camp Anderson. The next morning, the Brigade takes over Camp Anderson, and their leader, Hurst, kills Heather. Camp Anderson fights back, and the Brigade begins to slaughter survivors, and the group escapes. Reina offers to call Sarah Bridger, a camp leader in Eckington who opposes the Brigade. Bridger agrees to guide the group via radio through the subway underneath Dupont Circle to Eckington.

Reina informs Maya that the Family has a stash of antibiotics and medicine to treat the survivors still in Foggy Bottom, which the Brigade now controls. The group infiltrates the mall and retrieves the medicine. The Brigade launches an assault on the camp, which fails. Anderson leads an attack on the Brigade, where they take a maintenance tunnel that leads close to the Brigade's camp at the Lincoln Memorial. Once inside, they find Heather's body hung upside down on one of the pillars. Further in the camp, they find Hurst hiding in a panic room, where they kill him.

In the aftermath, the Brigade scatters, but Anderson learns that the Brigade is a much larger community, with Hurst taking orders from a superior named Patterson.

== Development ==
Overkill's The Walking Dead is developed by Overkill Software. According to brand director Almir Listo, although the game is a licensed title, Overkill was free to have their own interpretation of the source material and create the game with their own vision. Robert Kirkman, the creator of the comics, was involved in the game's production, providing advice and feedback. Listo added that the game was designed for "adults", and the story will explore "different things emotionally that aren't investigated much by the TV show". Despite being set in the comic series' universe, the game's four playable characters are original. According to Kirkman, the gameplay will be similar to Payday: The Heist. Listo noted that the game's gameplay will be similar to the raids featured in Destiny.

The game was announced on August 14, 2014 by Overkill Software. To celebrate the collaboration, Overkill announced that Lucille, a weapon from The Walking Dead, will be available for players of Payday 2. The game showed up at E3 2015 at a "proof of concept" for the virtual reality headset developed by Starbreeze Studios. In 2016, the game was delayed to ensure that the game would be available in Asian markets during the game's initial launch. It was delayed again in 2017. At E3 2018, the first gameplay footage was released. Starbreeze Studios released the game for Windows in November 2018 while 505 Games was to release the PlayStation 4 and Xbox One versions in February 2019.

All future efforts on the game were discontinued on February 26, 2019, and the console versions were cancelled as Skybound Entertainment terminated its contract with Starbreeze Studios due to the game's poor reception. This decision was made despite physical copies of said console versions already being shipped to stores alongside marketing material. These copies were recalled and the game was later removed from sales on Steam. Due to these issues, the game was considered a commercial failure. Starbreeze had been anticipating significant revenue from the game, and spent a year from December 2018 to December 2019 in corporate restructuring to regain a stable financial base to move forward.

== Reception ==
Reception

Aggregate score
Aggregator	Score
Metacritic	PC: 51/100

Review scores
Publication	Score
GameSpot	3/10
IGN	5.3/10
Metro	5/10
Slant Magazine	1/5

According to review aggregator Metacritic, the game received mixed reviews from critics. The game was a commercial failure for publisher Starbreeze.

Metro praised the smooth, competent gunplay and the well-polished post-apocalyptic world, but disliked the outdated design, severe repetition, infuriating difficulty spikes, and an overall lack of originality. Slant Magazine was even more critical, stating that the game "feels less like its own entry into the existing Walking Dead universe than a reskin of Payday 2" while criticizing the unreasonable load times, the technical issues and the long missions without checkpoints. It concluded the review with writing "Overkill's The Walking Dead certainly stokes the player's despair, but not the sort that its developers intended."
