= Dollars and Sense =

Dollars and Sense may refer to:

- Dollars & Sense, a magazine focusing on economics
- Dollars and Sense (TV series), a Canadian business affairs television series
- Dollars and Sense (film), a 1920 American silent drama film
