= Moneymakers =

- Also known as: Money Magazine (1978–1979)
- Presented by: Irv Lutsky (1975–1976); Sheldon Turcotte (1975–1976); Arthur Vaile (1975–1976); David Tafler (1976–1978); Judy Waytiuk (1976–1978); Phil Mathias (1978–1979); Harry Mannis (1978–1979)
- Country of origin: Canada
- Original language: English
- No. of seasons: 4

Production
- Executive producer: Peter Kaepple
- Producers: Brian O'Connor (1975–1976); Eric McLeery (1976–1979); Gary Weiss (1978–1979)
- Running time: 30 minutes

Original release
- Network: CBC Television
- Release: 5 October 1975 – 25 May 1979

Related
- Dollars and Sense (1972–1975); Payday (1973–1974)

Moneymakers (later Money Magazine) is a Canadian business television program that aired on CBC Television from 1975 to 1979.

== Premise ==
The CBC replaced Dollars and Sense (1972–1975) and Payday (1973–1974) with this new series of discussions, filmed segments and interviews. Episodes were produced on the day prior to airing to allow for current news developments.

== Scheduling ==
This half-hour series was broadcast as follows (times in Eastern zone):

Day	Time	Season run	Notes
Sundays	12:30 p.m.	from 5 October 1975	
Sundays	1:00 p.m.	18 June to 28 March 1976	
Sundays	12:30 p.m.	26 September 1976 to 5 June 1977	
Sundays	12:30 p.m.	from 25 September 1977	
Sundays	4:00 p.m.	2 April to 7 May 1978	
Sundays	12:30 p.m.	1 October 1978 to 25 May 1979	retitled Money Magazine
Fridays	9:30 a.m.	5 January to 25 March 1979	rebroadcasts
