= Global Virtual Reality Association =

Non-profit organization to assist the development of virtual reality

- Abbreviation: GVRA
- Formation: December 7, 2016
- Founder: Acer, Starbreeze, Google, HTC, Oculus, Samsung, Sony
- Dissolved: 2018
- Type: Non-profit
- Purpose: Promote unified development of virtual reality
- Website: gvra.com

The Global Virtual Reality Association (GVRA) was a non-profit organization to assist the development of virtual reality. The organization was founded in 2016 and operated until around 2018.

Its members were the major manufacturers of virtual reality equipment at that time. The association aimed to promote dialogue between stakeholders by setting up working groups and developing best practices.

== History ==
On 7 December 2016, the Global Virtual Reality Association was announced with the goal of promoting responsible development and adoption of VR.

== Members ==
- StarVR (Acer and Starbreeze Studios)
- Google
- HTC
- Oculus
- Samsung
- Sony
