= Payday (Canadian TV series) =

1973 Canadian talk show

- Presented by: Bob Oxley; Richard J. Needham
- Country of origin: Canada
- Original language: English
- No. of seasons: 2
- No. of episodes: 21

Production
- Executive producer: John Lackie
- Producer: Eric McLeery
- Running time: 30 minutes

Original release
- Network: CBC Television
- Release: 22 July 1973 – 29 December 1974

Related
- Moneymakers

Payday is a Canadian talk show that aired on CBC Television from 1973 to 1974.

== Premise ==
This program concerned the relationship between unions and businesses, using a discussion format and evenly seeking points of view from both industry and labour. Topics from the first season included union presence in white-collar work, multi-national unions, pensions, strikebreaking and women in the workforce. The second season topics featured bodies such as the Labour Peace Commission and the Canadian Labour Congress. These newer episodes also discussed resource-based industries such as Albertan oil production, British Columbian forestry, North Atlantic fishing or Yukon mining, while some other episodes discussed arbitration, health and immigration.

== Scheduling ==
The first season of this half-hour program was broadcast for eight episodes on Sundays at 2:00 p.m. (Eastern) from 22 July to 9 September 1973. Its second season aired 13 episodes Sundays at 1:00 p.m. from 29 September to 29 December 1974. Payday and Dollars and Sense were discontinued in favour of the new Moneymakers program from October 1975 to cover such subject matter.
