= Rockstar Games =

American video game publisher

Rockstar Games, Inc.
- Type: Subsidiary
- Industry: Video games
- Predecessor: BMG Interactive
- Founded: December 1998; 27 years ago
- Founders: Terry Donovan; Gary Foreman; Dan Houser; Sam Houser; Jamie King
- Headquarters: New York City, US
- Key people: Sam Houser (president); Jennifer Kolbe (vice president)
- Products: Grand Theft Auto; Max Payne; Midnight Club; Red Dead
- Number of employees: 4,711 (2026)
- Parent: Take-Two Interactive
- Subsidiaries: See § Studios
- Website: rockstargames.com

Rockstar Games, Inc. is an American video game publisher based in New York City. The company was established in December 1998 as a subsidiary of Take-Two Interactive, using the assets Take-Two had previously acquired from BMG Interactive. Founding members of the company were Terry Donovan, Gary Foreman, Dan and Sam Houser, and Jamie King, who worked for Take-Two at the time, and of which the Houser brothers were previously executives at BMG Interactive. Sam Houser heads the studio as president.

Rockstar North, founded as DMA Design in 1988 and based in Edinburgh, is the principal developer of the Grand Theft Auto series. Since 1999, several companies acquired by or established under Take-Two have become part of Rockstar Games, such as Rockstar Canada (later renamed Rockstar Toronto) becoming the first one in 1999, and Rockstar Australia the most recent in 2025. All companies organized under Rockstar Games bear the "Rockstar" name and logo. In this context, Rockstar Games is sometimes also referred to as Rockstar New York, Rockstar NY or Rockstar NYC. Rockstar Games also owns a motion capture studio in Bethpage, New York.

Rockstar Games predominantly publishes games in the action-adventure genre, although its racing games have also achieved success. Grand Theft Auto V, released in September 2013, has sold over 230 million copies, making it the second-best-selling video game of all time. Its successor, Grand Theft Auto VI, was released in November 2026. Its release marked the biggest entertainment launch in history. Other notable franchises published by Rockstar Games include Red Dead, Midnight Club, Max Payne, and Manhunt.

== History ==
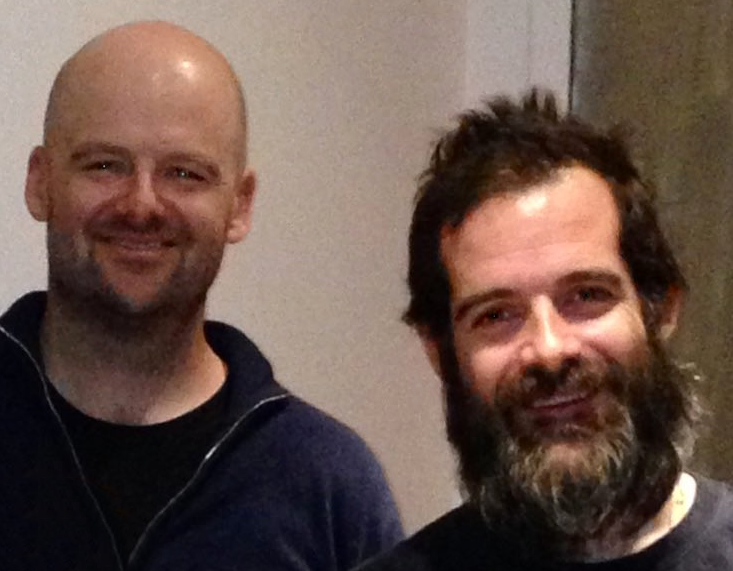
Brothers and co-founders Dan Houser (left) and Sam Houser photographed in the early 2010s. Dan left the company in 2020; Sam is the president.

On March 12, 1998, Take-Two Interactive announced its acquisition of the assets of dormant British video game publisher BMG Interactive from BMG Entertainment (a unit of Bertelsmann). In exchange, Take-Two was to issue 1.85 million shares (around 16%) of its common stock to BMG Entertainment. Through this acquisition, Take-Two obtained several of BMG Interactive's former intellectual properties, including DMA Design's Grand Theft Auto and Space Station Silicon Valley. The deal was announced to have closed on March 25.

Three BMG Interactive executives—Dan Houser, Sam Houser, and Jamie King—as well as Gary Foreman of BMG Interactive and Terry Donovan of BMG Entertainment's Arista Records record label, subsequently moved to New York City to work for Take-Two Interactive. In a restructuring announced that April, Sam Houser was appointed as Take-Two's "vice president of worldwide product development". In December 1998, the Houser brothers, Donovan and King established Rockstar Games as the "high-end" publishing label of Take-Two. The formation was formally announced on January 22, 1999.

In January 2007, Take-Two announced that Donovan, until then managing director for Rockstar Games, had left the company following a four-month leave of absence. He was succeeded by Gary Dale, who became chief operating officer. Dale previously worked with the Houser brothers and King at BMG Interactive, but left the company when it was acquired by Take-Two Interactive, and joined Capcom's European operations as managing director in 2003.

By February 2014, Rockstar Games titles had shipped more than 250 million copies, the largest franchise being the Grand Theft Auto series, which alone had shipments of at least 250 million as of November 2016. Grand Theft Auto V shipped the highest number of units within the series' and the company's history, with over 220 million copies, making it the second best-selling video game of all time.

At the 10th British Academy Games Awards in March 2014, Rockstar Games was honored with the BAFTA Academy Fellowship Award for "creating intricately layered interactive worlds that have kept the company at the forefront of the gaming industry for over a decade, both critically and commercially". Jennifer Kolbe, who started at the front desk of Take-Two, acts as Rockstar Games' head of publishing and oversees all development studios. Simon Ramsey is the company's head of PR and communications.

In May 2019, Rockstar Games announced that they were acquiring Dhruva Interactive from Starbreeze Studios for $7.9 million, with the sale being finalized later that month and the Dhruva team merged into Rockstar India.

In September 2019, Rockstar Games announced that it had released its own game launcher, a digital distribution, digital rights management, multiplayer and communications service. After having taken an extended break following the release of Red Dead Redemption 2 in early 2019, Dan Houser left Rockstar Games on March 11, 2020.

The company acquired the Scottish studio Ruffian Games in October 2020, rebranding the studio as Rockstar Dundee.

In September 2022, Rockstar was the target of a data breach in which 90 videos from the development of Grand Theft Auto VI were leaked. Rockstar described the leak as a "network intrusion", and noted that it was "extremely disappointed" by the manner in which the game was first demonstrated, but that it did not anticipate long-term effects on development.

In August 2023, Rockstar acquired Cfx.re (CitizenFX), the team behind the modding platforms FiveM and RedM for Grand Theft Auto V and Red Dead Redemption 2 respectively. Michael Unsworth, vice president of writing, departed the company in 2023 after sixteen years. In March 2025, Rockstar announced it would acquire Sydney-based studio Video Games Deluxe, consisting of former L.A. Noire developers, and rename it Rockstar Australia.

In April 2026, Rockstar was targeted by the ShinyHunters hacking group, who threatened to leak information on April 14. In a statement to Kotaku, Rockstar confirmed the breach and stated the incident has "no impact on our organization or our players".

== Company philosophy ==
Rockstar Games's employee count from 2018 to 2026.
View source data.

In October 2011, Dan Houser told Famitsu that Rockstar Games was intentionally avoiding developing games in the first-person shooter genre, because "it is in our DNA to avoid doing what other companies are doing ... the goalpoint of Rockstar is to have the players really feel what we're trying to do." Houser went on to say "Our games up to now have been different from any genre that existed at the time; we made new genres by ourselves with games like the GTA series. We didn't rely on testimonials in a business textbook to do what we've done. ... If we make the sort of games we want to play, then we believe people are going to buy them."

The company has been involved with charitable work ranging from supporting Movember and offering appearances in games as a raffle prize, to charity live streams.

== Labor relations ==
In October 2018, Jason Schreier published an account of crunch culture at Rockstar Games. According to Schreier, "Most current and former Rockstar employees said they had been asked or felt compelled to work nights and weekends," with many reporting working an average of 55 to 60 hours a week. Rockstar acknowledged that some employees had worked evenings and weekends, but disputed the average working hours as "individual anecdotes which are usually self-selecting...for the most extreme ends of the scale."

In October 2025, Rockstar fired 30 to 40 employees in Canada and the United Kingdom, citing public discussion and distribution of confidential information; Take-Two Interactive claimed that the firings were "for gross misconduct, and for no other reason". The Independent Workers' Union of Great Britain (IWGB) denied this and accused the company of union busting, stating the employees were attempting to unionize with labor organizers on Discord. Alex Marshall, president of the IWGB, called the firings the "most blatant and ruthless act of union busting in the history of the games industry". The IWGB organized protests outside Rockstar North and Take-Two's Edinburgh and London offices, respectively, on November 6, attended and supported by Scottish Greens co-leader Ross Greer.

In December 2025, Labour MP Chris Murray raised the issue at Prime Minister's Questions after meeting with the affected workers. In response, Prime Minister Keir Starmer said the firings were "deeply concerning" and said that the Government would investigate. In January 2026, a preliminary hearing by the Glasgow Employment Tribunal to assess providing interim relief (i.e., that Rockstar should continue paying the staff until a full hearing) rejected this, stating it did not appear likely that a full hearing would find trade union membership as the principal reason for dismissal. The Rockstar Games Workers Union was formed in May, comprising employees from Rockstar's Dundee, Leeds, Lincoln, London, and North studios.

== Studios ==
Outside of its New York City headquarters, Rockstar Games operates several subsidiary studios worldwide. All studios use the Rockstar Games logo with individual colors. As of 2026, the company has 4,711 employees across twelve offices, an increase from the 2018 head count of 2,441. The studios frequently collaborate and were collectively credited as Rockstar Studios in Max Payne 3, and simply as Rockstar Games in Red Dead Redemption 2 and Grand Theft Auto VI.

Logo	Name	Location	Founded	Acquired	Notes
	Rockstar Australia	Sydney, Australia	2013	2025	Developer of L.A. Noire: The VR Case Files
	Rockstar Dundee	Dundee, Scotland	2008	2020	
	Rockstar India	Bengaluru, India	2016	—N/a	
	Rockstar Los Angeles	Santa Monica, California, US	Unknown	—N/a	Dedicated team for non-player characters
	Rockstar Leeds	Leeds, England	1997	2004	Developer of Grand Theft Auto: Chinatown Wars, Liberty City Stories, and Vice City Stories
	Rockstar Lincoln	Lincoln, England	1992	2002	Handles localization and quality assurance
	Rockstar London	London, England	2005	—N/a	Developer of Manhunt 2 and Midnight Club: L.A. Remix
	Rockstar New England	Andover, Massachusetts, US	1999	2008	Developer of Bully: Scholarship Edition
	Rockstar North	Edinburgh, Scotland	1988	2002	Developer of the Grand Theft Auto series and Manhunt
	Rockstar San Diego	Carlsbad, California, US	1984	2002	Developer of the Red Dead, Smuggler's Run, and Midnight Club series
	Rockstar Toronto	Oakville, Ontario, Canada	Early 1980s	1999	Developer of The Warriors and several Windows ports
	Cfx	Remote	2016	2023	Developer of the FiveM and RedM projects

=== Former ===
Logo	Name	Location	Founded	Acquired	Closed	Notes
	Rockstar Vancouver	Vancouver, Canada	1998	2002	2012	Developer of Bully and Max Payne 3; merged into Rockstar Toronto in July 2012.
	Rockstar Vienna	Vienna, Austria	1993	2003	2006	Developer of several Xbox ports; closed down in May 2006

== Software ==
=== RAGE ===
Rockstar Advanced Game Engine (RAGE) is a game engine developed by the Rockstar San Diego-internal RAGE Technology Group, created to facilitate game development on all platforms since 2006. RAGE is used in most of Rockstar Games's titles for personal computers and consoles, including Red Dead Redemption, Grand Theft Auto IV, Max Payne 3, Grand Theft Auto V, Red Dead Redemption 2, and Grand Theft Auto VI.

=== Rockstar Games Social Club ===
Rockstar Games Social Club is an online gaming service created by Rockstar Games for authentication and multiplayer applications within its games. Most branding relating to Social Club was removed from Rockstar's website by November 2023.

=== Rockstar Games Launcher ===
Rockstar Games released its own games launcher for Windows on September 17, 2019. The launcher integrates with the user's Social Club account, allowing them to download and buy games that they have previously purchased through Rockstar's store, as well as launch Rockstar games available from other services, like Steam, from the launcher.

== Other ventures ==
=== Rockstar Loft ===
In 1999, Donovan and Sam Houser cooperated with John Davis to establish the Rockstar Loft club night. Davis had co-founded and been the promoter for Body & Soul, a "no-guestlist, no velvet rope party" held weekly at Tribeca's Club Vinyl. When Rockstar Games' founder originally arrived in New York City, former DJ Donovan was particularly impressed with Body & Soul, and they became close with the club night's team, including Davis and its other founder, DJ François K. Davis had sought to establish further such events, while Donovan and Houser wanted to get publicity for the young Rockstar Games, thus they established Rockstar Loft. According to Donovan, the event was to serve as an alternative those that were overly expensive or had attendees "bulldozed by security". He precluded video game installations at the venue to focus on the music and highlight the artists.

As it could not afford frequent television advertisements, Rockstar Games resorted to guerrilla marketing teams distributing fly posters and stickers. Tickets for Rockstar Loft were originally not sold in advance. Instead, potential guests were to call a phone number and face seven questions regarding their personality. If answered to the liking of the operator, the caller would receive their entry ticket in the mail. The first Rockstar Loft was held in western Chelsea, Manhattan, on October 30, 1999, with Andi Hanley (a regular of Body & Soul), Bob Sinclar, and Dimitri from Paris as headlining DJs. Thereafter, it was held "every few months", with one happening on February 19, 2000. Later that year, Rockstar Loft was wound down.

=== Films ===
Kirk Ewing—a friend of the Houser brothers who had worked with Rockstar Games on State of Emergency—stated that, around the release of Grand Theft Auto III in 2001, Rockstar Games had been offered $5 million for a film based on the Grand Theft Auto franchise. He had received a phone call from a producer in Los Angeles requesting the rights for a film to be directed by Tony Scott of Top Gun and starring rapper Eminem. When he relayed this proposal to Sam Houser, Houser said that he was not interested.

In 2004, Rockstar Games produced the sports drama film The Football Factory. Based on the book of the same name by John King, the film revolves around organized football hooliganism in the United Kingdom. The company also produced Sunday Driver, a documentary about the Majestics Lowrider Club in Compton, California, and The Introduction, an animated film that details the events leading up to Grand Theft Auto: San Andreas. Both were bundled with the game's special edition released in 2005.

=== CircoLoco Records ===
In May 2021, Rockstar Games launched the record label CircoLoco Records in collaboration with Circoloco, an Ibiza-based dance party. The collaboration grew from a friendship between Sam Houser and Circoloco's promoter, Antonio Carbonaro. According to Nick Benedetti, the party's manager, Rockstar Games and Circoloco intended to "contribute something new and meaningful" to the dance music scene, which had faced hardships because of the lockdowns brought on by the COVID-19 pandemic. CircoLoco Records' first release, Monday Dreamin', was released as a series of extended plays starting in June 2021.
