= Triton (demogroup) =

Former PC demogroup

Triton (TRN) was a demogroup active in the PC demoscene from 1992 to about 1996.

== History ==
Triton's first demo, Crystal Dream, was released in the summer of 1992 and won the PC demo competition at the Hackerence V demo party. Their second and last demo, Crystal Dream 2, was released in June 1993 and won the demo competition at The Computer Crossroads 1993 party in Gothenburg. It featured complex 3D scenes and demo effects such as vector slime. In 1993 they released a multi-channel MOD composer called Fast Tracker, followed by the XM module composer Fast Tracker 2 in 1994.

Triton created a commercial demo for Gravis UltraSound cards.

Most of their work was done using a combination of x86 assembler and Pascal using either Turbo Pascal or Borland Pascal 7 compilers.

Triton began developing on a fighting game named Into the Shadows. A game demo showing a character was released in 1995, but the development was stopped thereafter. In 1998, some of Triton's members founded the computer game development company Starbreeze Studios, that merged with O3 Games in 2001.

== Members ==
- Team founders (1992):
  - Vogue (Magnus Högdahl) - code, music
  - Mr. H (Fredrik Huss) - code
  - Loot (Anders Aldengård) - graphics, raytracing
- Members hired in 1993:
  - Lizardking (Gustaf Grefberg) - music
  - Joachim (Joachim Barrum) - graphics
  - Alt (Mikko Tähtinen) - graphics

== Releases ==
- Crystal Dream (1992, demo, 1st at Hackerence 92)
- Crystal Dream 2 (1993, demo, 1st at The Computer Crossroads 93)
- FastTracker 2 (1995, tracker)
