= The Dying Wonders of the World =

Studio album by The Duskfall
- Released: October 26, 2007
- Recorded: 2007
- Genre: Melodic death metal
- Length: 41:44
- Label: Nuclear Blast; Massacre
- Producer: The Duskfall

The Duskfall chronology
Lifetime Supply of Guilt (2005)	The Dying Wonders of the World (2007)

The Dying Wonders of the World is the fourth album by melodic death metal band The Duskfall, it was released on October 26, 2007. The album is the final album by the band before The Duskfall disbanded in August 2008.

== Track listing ==
1. "Paradises into Deserts" − 4:27
2. "The Wheel and the Black Light" − 3:48
3. "Deep in Your World" − 4:19
4. "Some More Sin on My Burden" − 4:26
5. "Shadows and Cancer" − 4:44
6. "Bring Us Your Infected" − 5:12
7. "The Option and the Poison" − 4:36
8. "Sealed with a Fist" − 3:51
9. "I've Only Got Knives for You" − 6:14
