= Dhruva Interactive =

Indian video game developer

- Type: Subsidiary
- Industry: Video games
- Founded: 15 March 1997; 29 years ago
- Founder: Rajesh Rao
- Defunct: 22 May 2019
- Fate: Merged into Rockstar India
- Headquarters: Bangalore, India
- Key people: Rajesh Rao (CEO); Ajit Pillai (CFO)
- Number of employees: 300 (2019)
- Parent: Starbreeze Studios (2017–2019); Rockstar Games (2019)

Dhruva Interactive was an Indian video game developer based in Bangalore. Rajesh Rao founded the company in March 1997 out of the multimedia company he had established two years earlier. Starbreeze Studios acquired a majority holding in Dhruva Interactive in 2017, which it sold to Rockstar Games in May 2019. With the latter sale, Dhruva Interactive was merged into Rockstar India, Rockstar Games' studio in Bangalore.

== History ==
Dhruva Interactive was founded by programmer Rajesh Rao. While he was an engineering student, he created a multimedia engine for the final assignment in his multimedia course, which he intended to use to establish a multimedia company. Having previously lived and worked in Europe, he decided to form his company in his native India. Using seed money from his father, Rao obtained a bank loan to purchase a computer and a 14.4 kbps modem, and founded his company in Bangalore on 15 March 1995 as a one-person operation. By 1997, the company had grown to five people. In February of that year, Intel approached Rao's company to develop a rendering engine for the manufacturer's new Pentium II chip. Rao described the signing of their contract in March 1997 as the end of "Dhruva 1.0" and the start of "Dhruva 2.0", the company's transition to a video game company. He formally founded Dhruva Interactive on 15 March 1997, making it the first in India. "Dhruva" is the Sanskrit word for the North Star, "the star that shows the way", according to Rao.

The company signed its first game development contract with Infogrames on 28 November 1998. Despite what Rao described as a "great job", the game was never released. Afterwards, Rao found that fully developing games as Dhruva Interactive's sole operation was not sustainable. The company transitioned to an outsourcing company. the end of "Dhruva 2.0" and the start of "Dhruva 3.0". In the search for clients in the United States and Europe, Dhruva Interactive released the game demo Saloon in March 2001. The company intentionally used a Wild West setting to appeal to the target Western audience. As the team had never seen a saloon before, they sought references via the emerging Google Search, a technique they would continue to employ to understand certain parts of Western culture.

In December 2016, the Swedish video game company Starbreeze Studios announced that it had acquired a 90.5% stake in Dhruva for US$7 million in cash and $1.5 million of its stock, with an earn-out agreement of $800,000. At the time, Dhruva had 320 employees in three studios: two in Bangalore and one in Dehradun. The completion of the acquisition was delayed into 2017 due to regulatory issues in India and complete on 28 August. In May 2019, a financially stricken Starbreeze agreed to sell its stake in Dhruva Interactive, now at 91.82%, to the American publisher Rockstar Games for $7.9 million. Once the deal would close, which was expected to happen in early 2019, the studio's 300 employees would join Rockstar India, Rockstar Games's existing studio in Bangalore. The sale was completed on 22 May.
