= The Outforce =

2001 video game

- Developer(s): O3 Games
- Publisher(s): Pan Interactive, Strategy First
- Engine: O3D
- Platform(s): Microsoft Windows
- Release: NA: 4 January 2001
- Genre(s): Real-time strategy
- Mode(s): Single-player, multiplayer

The Outforce is a 2001 top-down real-time strategy game played across a battlefield in space. It is the first game from O3 Games, which later became Starbreeze Studios.

== Gameplay ==
The Outforce is a real-time strategy game set in the depths of space. There are three races from which to choose, and more than 120 different units available, including tow ships, phasing units, and self-destructing units. The 3-D environment features a free-floating camera with a variable zoom field. The game's artificial intelligence has a genetic learning algorithm, and the physics system includes pressure waves, elastic collisions, gravity, and push-and-pull force. Up to eight players can battle it out over the Internet or on a LAN.

== Reception ==
Reception

Aggregate score
Aggregator	Score
Metacritic	56/100

Review scores
Publication	Score
GameSpot	7/10
GameZone	7/10
IGN	6.5/10
PC Zone	55%

The game received "mixed or average" reviews, according to video game review aggregator Metacritic. Nevertheless, it was a success for O3 Games.
