= Rockstar India =

Indian video game developer

Rockstar Interactive India LLP
- Trade name: Rockstar India
- Type: Subsidiary
- Industry: Video games
- Founded: August 2016; 10 years ago
- Headquarters: Bengaluru, India
- Key people: Daniel Smith (studio director)
- Number of employees: >1,600 (2026)
- Parent: Rockstar Games

Rockstar Interactive India LLP (trade name: Rockstar India) is an Indian video game developer and a studio of Rockstar Games based in Bengaluru. The company was established in August 2016 and is led by studio director Daniel Smith. It absorbed Dhruva Interactive, India's oldest game developer, in May 2019.

== History ==
Prior to the creation of Rockstar India, Rockstar Games had collaborated with Technicolor India, the Bengaluru-based studio of Technicolor SA, on games like Red Dead Redemption (2010), L.A. Noire (2011), and Max Payne 3 (2012). In October 2012, Technicolor and Rockstar Games announced the opening of the "Rockstar Dedicated Unit" within Technicolor India, which was to size around 80–90 people and work solely on Rockstar Games's products. Around August 2016, Rockstar Games established Rockstar India as an internal studio in Bangalore. Daniel Smith was installed as the studio manager. The studio was part of the development team on Red Dead Redemption 2, which was released in October 2018.

In May 2019, Rockstar Games agreed to acquire Starbreeze Studios's majority stake in Dhruva Interactive, the oldest game developer in India, for US$7.9 million. Dhruva Interactive's 300-person team was to be integrated with Rockstar India, which had grown to approximately 500 employees; many continued working on existing client projects after the transition, which was advised by Dhruva Interactive's founder and chief executive officer Rajesh Rao. The acquisition was completed on 22 May. With more than 1,600 employees by November 2026, Rockstar India was one of the largest contributors to Grand Theft Auto VI, which was released that month.

== Games developed ==
List of games developed by Rockstar India
Year	Title	Platform(s)	Publisher(s)
2018	Red Dead Redemption 2	Windows, PlayStation 4, Stadia, Xbox One	Rockstar Games
2026	Grand Theft Auto VI	PlayStation 5, Xbox Series X/S	Rockstar Games
