= Payday (video game series) =

- Logo for the first two games of the series
- Genre: First-person shooter
- Developers: Overkill Software; Starbreeze Studios; PopReach Games; Fast Travel Games; Sidetrack Games
- Publishers: Sony Online Entertainment; 505 Games; Deep Silver; Starbreeze Studios
- Platforms: Windows; Android; iOS; PlayStation 3; Xbox 360; PlayStation 4; Xbox One; Nintendo Switch; PlayStation 5; Xbox Series X/S
- First release: Payday: The Heist; 18 October 2011
- Latest release: Payday 3; 21 September 2023

Payday is a first-person shooter video game series created by Overkill Software. In Payday games, players assume control of criminals who must orchestrate high-stake heists and robberies, while battling law enforcement. While players can play the games solo, all games in the series focus heavily on cooperative gameplay. The franchise had three main games: Payday: The Heist (2011), Payday 2 (2013), and Payday 3 (2023). According to Starbreeze, the franchise had sold more than 50 million copies and generated more than $400 million in revenue.

== Main games ==
Release timeline
2011	Payday: The Heist
2012
2013	Payday 2
2014
2015
2016
2017
2018
2019
2020
2021
2022
2023	Payday 3
2023	Payday: Crime War
2024	Notoriety: A Payday Experience
2025
2026	Payday: Aces High

=== Payday: The Heist (2011) ===
Payday: The Heist was developed by Overkill Software and published by Sony Online Entertainment. At launch, the game features six different heists, while post-release downloadable content packs introduced additional ones. The game was released on October 19, 2011. By 2011, the game had sold more than 400,000 copies.

=== Payday 2 (2013) ===
In April 2012, Overkill Software was acquired by Starbreeze Studios. The senior management of Overkill Software took over both companies, and initiated the development of a sequel, Payday 2, in conjunction with publisher 505 Games. The team was inspired by Diablo and The Dark Knight while creating the game, and it introduces multi-stage missions and an expanded progression system. Payday 2 was released on August 13, 2013, for Windows, PlayStation 3 and Xbox 360. An enhanced version of the game, subtitled Crimewave Edition, was released for PlayStation 4 and Xbox One in June 2015 and for the Nintendo Switch in February 2018.

It was a massive commercial success, selling more than 40 million copies and sustaining the studio when it had financial difficulties during the late 2010s. In May 2016, Starbreeze fully acquired the intellectual property rights from 505. It was supported extensively with updates and downloadable content packs, with the developer launching a subscription service as an alternative way to access them in late 2025.

On October 21, 2025, Starbreeze announced partnership with Sidetrack Games, a Payday 2 modding team formerly known as the M.U.G. Team, stating that Sidetrack will continue maintaining and updating Payday 2 while Starbreeze "maintains full focus on Payday 3". After 9 month of work on June 26, 2026, Sidetrack Games announced the upgrade to the game's engine titled "Diesel 3.0" and upcoming open beta testing for it starting June 30th. Some of the announced improvements added in the update included porting of the engine to 64-bit architecture, upgrade of the graphics API from DX 9 to DX 11, decreasing the file size to ~32 GB from previous size of 87 GB, and general performance improvements for modern systems.

=== Payday 3 (2023) ===
Payday 3 was confirmed by Starbreeze in 2016. It was published by Deep Silver in September 2023. The game had a troubled launch, with server issues causing it to be unplayable for weeks. Player count of Payday 3 quickly dwindled and was eventually surpassed by its predecessor.

== Other games ==
=== Payday: Crime War (2023) ===
Payday: Crime War is a Payday game developed for mobile platforms. The original version, developed by Cmune and published by NBCUniversal, was a competitive multiplayer game which involved two teams of players, one playing as criminals while another playing as law enforcement officers, battling each other. It was relaunched in 2023 by PopReach Games as a more condensed version of Payday 2.

=== Notoriety: A Payday Experience (2024) ===
Notoriety: A Payday Experience is an official licensed Payday video game within Roblox. Before it was officially brought into the Payday franchise, the fan game had already accumulated more than 424 million visits by players. In November of 2026, Notoriety was added into Roblox's "The Takeback" event

=== Payday: Aces High (2026) ===
Payday: Aces High is an upcoming cooperative game designed for virtual reality platforms. The game is currently being developed by Fast Travel Games in conjunction with Starbreeze. It is scheduled to launch on 5 November 2026 for SteamVR and Meta Quest 3.

== Other media ==
Vice Studios had acquired the rights to create movies or TV series based on the Payday franchise. Curtis Jackson later boarded the show as executive producer through his G-Unit Films and Television Inc. banner.
