= The Duskfall =

Swedish melodic death metal band

- Also known as: Soulash (1999-2001)
- Origin: Luleå, Sweden
- Genre: Melodic death metal
- Years active: 1999–2008, 2014–present
- Labels: Massacre, Nuclear Blast, Black Lotus
- Members: Mikael Sandorf; Patrik Forlund; Anton Lindbäck; Sebastian Lindgren; Ronny Edlund
- Past members: See Members

The Duskfall is a Swedish melodic death metal band from Luleå, formed in 1999. The band released four full-length studio albums and split in 2008. They reformed in 2014.

== History ==
Guitarist Mikael Sandorf formed the band in 1999 after leaving melodic death metal band Gates of Ishtar. The band was named Soulash, until changing it to The Duskfall in 2001. Tommi Konu and Urban Carlsson departed the band, and drummer Oskar Karlsson (from the later period of Gates of Ishtar) and bassist Kaj Molin joined in. The band recorded and released the demo Deliverance in 2001.

In 2002, Duskfall released their debut album, Frailty, produced by Daniel Bergstrand. After the release of Frailty, guitarist Joachim Lindbäck joined the band. Source was recorded at Daniel Bergstrand's Dug Out Studios in 2003. Joachim Lindbäck and Kaj Molin left, and the band recruited guitarist Antti Lindholm (also the vocalist and guitarist of Finnish hard rock trio Lambs) and bassist Marco Eronen. Duskfall recorded their third studio album, Lifetime Supply of Guilt.

The Duskfall released their fourth album, The Dying Wonders of the World, on October 26, 2007.

A statement on the official website, dated August 4, 2008, confirmed that the band had disbanded following the departure of main songwriter and founder Mikael Sandorf.

In 2014, Sandorf announced the band was back together via social media and would record the band's fifth album. Ahti Kortelainen (Sonata Arctica, Moonsorrow, Sentenced) produced the album, Where The Tree Stands Dead.

The Duskfall announced on Facebook that Aki Häkkinen, frontman of Finnish nu-metal band Grinister, replaced Klavborn on vocals. They announced bassist Jonatan Storm's departure, with Anton Lindbäck replacing him.

During December 2016, The Duskfall confirmed their new lead guitarist, Jakob Björnfot (replacing Ronny Edlund). During mid 2017, they announced Aki Häkkinen's departure. In 2017, Edlund rejoined the band. The band's album The Everlasting Shadows was set to come out in 2019 via Black Lion Records.

== Members ==
Current members

- Mikael Sandorf – drums (1999-2001), lead guitar (2001-2008, 2014-2017), vocals (2001, 2017-present)
- Ronny Edlund - rhythm guitar (2014-2016, 2017-present)
- Anton Lindbäck - bass (2015-present)
- Patrik Forlund – lead guitar(2019-present)
- Sebastian Lindgren - drums (2016-present)

Former members

- Pär Johansson - vocals (1999-2000)
- Kai Jaakkola - vocals (2001-2008)
- Magnus Klavborn - vocals (2014-2015)
- Aki Häkkinen - vocals (2015-2017)
- Antti Lindholm - rhythm guitar (2004-2008), bass (2005)
- Jonny Ahlgren - rhythm guitar (1999-2001)
- Jakob Björnfot – lead guitar(2017-2019)
- Glenn Svensson - lead guitar (1999-2002)
- Joachim Lindbäck - lead guitar (2003-2004)
- Tommi Konu - bass (1999-2001)
- Kaj Molin - bass (2001-2005)
- Matte Järnil - bass (2006-2008)
- Kim Bjäle - bass (2014)
- Jonatan Storm - bass, vocals (2014-2015)
- Urban Carlsson - drums (2001)
- Oskar Karlsson - drums (2001-2008)
- Fredrik Andersson - drums (2014-2016)

Timeline

== Discography ==
Album title	Release date	Record label
Frailty	November 30, 2002	Black Lotus
Source	December 30, 2003	Black Lotus
Lifetime Supply of Guilt	August 12, 2005	Nuclear Blast
The Dying Wonders of the World	October 26, 2007	Nuclear Blast/Massacre
Where the Tree Stands Dead	November 21, 2014	Apostasy Records
The Everlasting Shadows	March 6, 2026	Black Lion Records

== In popular media ==
- The video for the song "Shoot It In" is featured in the video game The Darkness.
- The song "Case Closed" is featured in the film Five Across the Eyes.
