= Overkill Software =

Swedish video game developer

- Logo since 2009
- Type: Subsidiary
- Industry: Video games
- Predecessor: Grin
- Founded: Stockholm, Sweden (2009)
- Founder: Ulf Andersson; Bo Andersson; Simon Viklund
- Headquarters: Stockholm, Sweden
- Area served: Worldwide
- Key people: Ulf Andersson; Bo Andersson
- Products: Payday series
- Number of employees: 11-50 (2023)
- Parent: Starbreeze Studios; (2012–present)
- Website: overkillsoftware.com

Overkill Software is a Swedish video game developer based and founded in Stockholm in 2009 by Ulf Andersson, Bo Andersson, the founders and owners of defunct game developer Grin, along with Simon Viklund. In 2012, Swedish game studio Starbreeze Studios acquired Overkill. The company is known for their Payday series, consisting of Payday: The Heist, Payday 2, and Payday 3.

== History ==
Brothers Bo and Ulf Andersson had founded Grin in 1997, which had some successful titles including Bionic Commando. However, when a deal with Square Enix to make a Final Fantasy-based game fell through, Grin went bankrupt and was shut down in 2009. The Anderssons launched Overkill Software that same year after Grin was shut down due to bankruptcy, with their first project being Payday: The Heist, released in 2011. Payday was a success for PC and PlayStation 3.

Overkill desired to make a sequel to Payday, but did not have extensive financial resources to complete this project. They worked a deal with another Swedish studio, Starbreeze Studios, which at the same time was running low on cash while trying to develop Brothers: A Tale of Two Sons. While officially, Overkill was acquired by Starbreeze on 19 April 2012, those familiar with the deal, speaking to Eurogamer stated that this was more akin to Overkill's investors, including the Andersson's Varvtre AB group, becoming the majority shareholders of Starbreeze, and the few staff and assets left with Starbreeze were incorporated into Overkill's Stockholm offices. The net result gave Overkill the necessary funding to complete Payday 2, which was released in 2013, along with Starbreeze's Brothers, with publishing support from 505 Games. Ultimately, 505 Games sold its part of the Payday intellectual property ownership back to Starbreeze on 30 May 2016, leaving Starbreeze and Overkill full ownership of the franchise. By 2013, Bo Andersson was named CEO of Starbreeze while still overseeing Overkill's operations.

Following the release of Payday 2, Bo and Ulf had a falling out. Ulf Andersson, the chief creative director on Payday 2, reportedly had been burned out by its development, and had not shown up to work for several months, according to those close to Overkill. Bo bought out Ulf's shares of Varvtre AB, and Ulf officially announced his departure from Overkill on 4 May 2015 for unstated reasons, though remained a consultant for Overkill for the next two years. Ulf Andersson went on to form the 10 Chambers Collective, which is working on GTFO, a science fiction game that borrows from some of Payday's concepts. The two studios do now occasionally collaborate in promotional material.

In 2014, Starbreeze announced that it had acquired the rights for The Walking Dead for Overkill to make Overkill's The Walking Dead with a planned 2016 release date. Following Payday 2, Overkill's game was planned to follow similar approaches as Payday, a four-player cooperative experience set in a persistently-changing world. The game was initially developed on the Diesel engine, the same engine that had been used on several Grin titles. However, Starbreeze continued to acquire several properties over the next few years, including acquiring the under-development Valhalla game engine for around US$8.6 million in 2015. Starbreeze's intent was for Valhalla, a virtual reality-ready engine, to be used for all future Overkill projects, and the development of Overkill's The Walking Dead was switched to Valhalla. Valhalla proved extremely difficult for the studio to use, with developers estimating that 50 to 60% of their time was involved with trying to wrangle the engine rather than any actual game development. By 2016, Starbreeze announced the game would be delayed into 2017, but by early 2017, Starbreeze and Overkill recognized they would not be able to ship this game for some time, and so decided in April 2017 to change the game's engine again from Valhalla to the Unreal Engine. At this point, both Overkill and Starbreeze developers were rushing to complete the game for a 2018 release, and while the Unreal engine provided a more stable base to work from, only about 10% the developers knew the engine well enough, requiring extra time for others to come up to speed. Additionally, the developers faced work under micromanagement and "crunch time" to avoid another major delay, further hampering the quality of the work. Overkill's The Walking Dead was released for personal computers in November 2018, with plans for console releases to follow, but the resulting game received mixed reviews, selling an estimate 100,000 copies, far less than Starbreeze had expected. The console versions were put on hold, and in the months that followed, Bo Andersson was let go as Starbreeze's CEO and later was investigated by the Swedish Economic Crime Authority for insider trading but ultimately cleared of wrongdoing.

Former Battlefield 3 and Battlefield: Bad Company 2 lead designer David Goldfarb was the lead designer and game director for Payday 2. In 2014 he left Overkill to start his own studio.

On 18 August 2015, sound designer and composer Simon Viklund left Overkill to focus on his solo music projects. However, he continued to voice Bain in Payday 2 and produce music for Payday 2 as a freelancer until 2018. He continues to be active in the game's community, and occasionally appears in promotional material.

== Games ==
Title	Year	Genre	Platform	Source
Payday: The Heist	2011	First-person shooter	Windows, PlayStation 3 (PSN)	
Payday 2	2013	First-person shooter	Windows, Xbox 360, PlayStation 3, Xbox One, PlayStation 4, Linux, Nintendo Switch	
Overkill's The Walking Dead	2018	First-person shooter	Windows	
Payday: Crime War (as part of Starbreeze Studios)	2023	First-person shooter	Android, iOS	
Payday 3 (as part of Starbreeze Studios)	2023	First-person shooter	Windows, PlayStation 5, Xbox Series X/S, Linux	
Storm (as part of Starbreeze Studios)	Closed Development	First-person shooter	Windows, PlayStation 4, Xbox One	
