= Enclave (video game) =

2002 video game

- European Xbox cover art
- Developer: Starbreeze Studios
- Publishers: Xbox: EU: Swing! Entertainment; NA: Conspiracy Games; Windows: EU: Atari Europe S.A.S.U.; NA: Black Label Games; Wii, Mac, Linux; TopWare Interactive
- Producer: Nick Kyriakidis
- Designers: Magnus Högdahl; Jens Andersson; Mikael Wahlberg
- Programmers: Magnus Högdahl; Erik Olofsson
- Platforms: Xbox; Microsoft Windows; Wii; OS X Linux; Nintendo Switch; PlayStation 4 Xbox One
- Release: Xbox: PAL: July 19, 2002; NA: July 29, 2002; Windows: NA: March 11, 2003; PAL: September 12, 2003; Wii: PAL: May 22, 2012; Mac: WW: November 15, 2013; Linux: WW: November 10, 2016; Switch, PS4, Xbox One: WW: June 29, 2023
- Genre: Action-adventure
- Mode: Single-player

Enclave is an action-adventure game developed by Starbreeze Studios and released for the Xbox in July 2002. Set in a medieval fantasy realm, players can choose to take on the role of either a "Warrior of Light" or a "Minion of Darkness", complete with separate and unique missions reflecting the nature of that decision.

A Microsoft Windows port was released in March 2003. A GameCube version was also in development but was eventually cancelled in early 2003. A Wii port, titled Enclave: Shadows of Twilight, was originally slated for the middle of June 2010, and was released in Europe on May 22, 2012. On October 4, 2013, the game was re-released on Steam and GOG.com and made available on OS X and Linux platforms. A remaster published by Ziggurat Interactive titled Enclave HD was released on Nintendo Switch, PlayStation 4, and Xbox One on June 29, 2023.

== Gameplay ==
Enclave is a third-person action-adventure game mixing puzzles, shooting, sword fights and more in a level-based structure. The player uses medieval and magical weapons to fight enemies. It also includes an optional first-person mode if the player chooses. At the beginning of each mission, the player chooses a character to control. With the character selected, the player selects weapons and gear to equip for the mission. Gold is required to equip all gear. During each mission, the player collects gold and gems to increase the starting gold available at the start of each mission.

== Plot ==
Enclave plays in the world of Celenheim that gets ruled by magic, the people of Light and Darkness were separated by an infinitely deep rift that split the Earth millennia ago as a consequence of war. It forms an enclave of integrity and order, surrounded by the disfigured and barren wastelands of Darkness, the war-ravaged plains known as the Outlands. Over the centuries, however, the deep rift began to close, and skirmishes between the forces of Light and Darkness along the borderlands soon became commonplace. Now, it is only a matter of time before these conflicts erupt into a merciless war.

Celenheim fights for survival. A group of men and women are sent on a perilous journey in the hope of saving the enclave from destruction. Their adventure takes them through hostile territory in search of the people of Meckelon, their ancient ancestors from whom they were separated long ago. Perhaps they will find in them the help they so desperately need.

But Mordessa, the dark and mysterious leader of the Outlands, plans to summon the ancient demon Vatar, who was responsible for the world's division, from the depths of the underworld in order to claim the magical lands of Celenheim. To this end, she sends her servants to obtain an artifact of forbidden knowledge, hidden from humanity until now: the Book of Souls. With the book's contents, she would possess the key to the underworld and to powers beyond the reach of mortals.

== Reception ==
According to GameRankings, the game received the average score of 75.04% for the PC and 70.78% for the Xbox version. According to Metacritic, the PC version received 71% and the Xbox version received 66%.

== Cancelled sequel ==
In March 2003, Starbreeze announced that Enclave II was in development for Xbox, PlayStation 2, GameCube, and Microsoft Windows. It was supposed to feature a new fighting system and full motion capture, with single-player and both cooperative and competitive multiplayer modes planned. The player character was Erlendur, a young Ancestor sorcerer apprentice, and his quest was to reach Enclave before the evil sorceress Callia does. However, the features were axed and the game was canceled when Starbreeze got into legal troubles with Swing! Entertainment. The game was reworked into Knights of the Temple a few months after the announcement.
