= The Darkness (video game) =

2007 first-person shooter video game

- North American cover art
- Developer: Starbreeze Studios
- Publisher: 2K
- Producer: Lars Johansson
- Designer: Jens Andersson
- Programmer: Magnus Högdahl
- Artist: Jens Matthies
- Writers: Paul Jenkins; Mikael Säker
- Composer: Gustaf Grefberg
- Series: The Darkness
- Platforms: Xbox 360, PlayStation 3
- Release: NA: June 25, 2007; PAL: June 29, 2007 (X360); PAL: July 20, 2007 (PS3)
- Genre: First-person shooter
- Modes: Single-player, multiplayer

The Darkness is a first-person shooter video game developed by Starbreeze Studios and published by 2K for the PlayStation 3 and Xbox 360 consoles. The game was released in 2007 in North America and Europe and it is based on The Darkness comic book series published by Top Cow Productions. A sequel titled The Darkness II was released in 2012.

Additionally, the game can be purchased from the Xbox digital store and played on Xbox One and Xbox Series consoles through the Xbox backwards compatibility program.

== Plot ==
A Darkling threatens a passerby while the Creeping Dark tendrils watch.

The player takes on the role of Jackie Estacado (Kirk Acevedo), with the story presented through narration by himself. On the evening of his 21st birthday, Jackie is targeted for assassination by his "Uncle" Paulie Franchetti (Dwight Schultz) out of sheer paranoia that Jackie is after his position as the Don. As night falls, the Darkness (Mike Patton) - an ancient demonic force which has inhabited Jackie's bloodline for generations - violently manifests and massacres his pursuers. With his new powers, Jackie gradually dismantles Paulie's drug and money laundering operations.

In retaliation, Franchetti bombs St. Mary's Orphanage where Jackie grew up and has his main enforcer, Police Captain Eddie Shrote (Jim Mathers), kidnap Jackie's childhood girlfriend, Jenny Romano (Lauren Ambrose), and take her to the orphanage to use for bait. Jackie hastily searches the building for her while the Darkness taunts him with his memories. When he finally reaches them, the Darkness restrains him and he is forced to watch as Paulie murders Jenny. While Paulie and Eddie flee, a grief-stricken Jackie commits suicide.

Jackie finds himself waking up in the Otherworld, a hellish landscape controlled by the Darkness resembling the trenches of World War I and inhabited by undead patchwork German and British soldiers at war as well as physical representations of the Four Horsemen of the Apocalypse. There he meets his great-great-grandfather, Anthony "Tony" Estacado (Kirk Baltz), who explains that it was he who brought the Darkness into their family and that Jackie can be free of the curse by invading the Otherworld's innermost castle and facing the Darkness there.

Once he recovers, Jackie determines that he must dispose of Eddie before he can face Paulie. After failing to kill him at his apartment, Jackie steals a briefcase containing illicit goods in his ownership from a Turkish bath that is used as a front by his corrupt police officers, which he rigs with an explosive. Jackie sets up a meeting with him at Trinity Church, but ends up being captured by his men following a shootout. After overhearing about a shipment of drugs that a Chicago mob is entrusting to Paulie to handle from one of his officers, Jackie triggers the explosive, killing Eddie and his men along with himself. Jackie re-awakens in the Otherworld and lays siege to the Darkness's castle with Tony's help. Tony is mortally wounded in the attack, but before he can tell Jackie the last steps needed to free himself from the Darkness, the spirit pulls him away.

Jackie faces the Darkness and surprises it by willingly being taken by the Darkness's power, allowing him to fully control the spirit back in the real world. However, the Darkness tells him that while he has control now, each time Jackie takes a life, he will become more consumed by the Darkness. He lays an assault on the drug shipment, causing Paulie to flee to the safety of a lighthouse mansion for fear of retribution from the Chicago mob for his failure of protecting the drug shipment plus the fact that they see Paulie has become a liability due to his unstable nature and using his failure as pretext to get rid of him. Jackie takes advantage of a solar eclipse to raid the mansion and finally kill Paulie. The Darkness revels in Jackie's murderous spree, and fully envelops Jackie.

In the epilogue, Jackie finds himself in a dream, lying on a park bench in Jenny's arms. Jenny explains that they are only allowed a few minutes to be together before they say goodbye to each other for the last time. Jackie tries to ask how, but Jenny just quiets him, allowing them to enjoy the last moments together before Jackie wakes back up with the screen fading to black.

== Gameplay ==
The game includes a range of modern-day weapons as well as the powers of the Darkness, which include summoning four imp-like creatures called "Darklings" that can attack foes, using "Dark" tentacles to impale foes or break down walls, using "Creeping Dark" tendrils that sneak along floors, walls and ceilings to take out foes from a distance, and creating a black hole that sucks anything nearby into it. The Darkness powers cannot be used in a well-lit area but can be used in darker areas and under total darkness; the player is able to shoot out lights to help increase the amount of dark energy available. Additionally, by letting the Darkness consume the hearts of its victims, the player can further increase the effects of the Darkness powers.

Over the course of the game, Jackie comes into possession of Darkness guns that are more powerful than conventional weapons but consume Darkness energy in order to fire. The Darkness guns are dual wielded.

The game has several levels based on New York City locales that players visit multiple times. A subway system allows the player to move between areas. While the main plot is primarily linear, requiring the player to visit each area in a certain order, the player can undertake side missions by speaking with non-player characters that wander the subway stations. Completing sub-missions earns the player a "collectible" phone number which can then be used at any phone to unlock additional game media; collectibles can also be found scattered throughout the level. The Otherworld levels feature collectibles in the form of unposted postal mail that the player can deliver when back in New York City in order to unlock the content.

In the game, the film To Kill a Mockingbird is shown; the player is able to watch the entirety of the film if they remain motionless in that particular part of the game, while the character's girlfriend falls asleep by him. Maximum PC called the scene "the most authentic instance of romance ever conveyed in a videogame". Also included is the film The Man with the Golden Arm, a full episode of Flash Gordon, the film The Street Fighter with Sonny Chiba, and cartoon shorts of Popeye and Gabby.

== Development ==
In March 2005, Majesco obtained the publishing rights for the game, but later sold the rights in December that year due to financial troubles. 2K Games then obtained the publishing rights in March 2006, releasing the game in North America on June 25, 2007. The game was released in PAL territories for Xbox 360 on June 29 and on July 20 for PlayStation 3.

To promote the game, a five-issue comic book mini-series retelling the game entitled The Darkness: Level by writers Paul Jenkins and David Wohl was released from December 2006 to June 2007. The mini-series was collected into a trade paperback in October 2007.

The developers included various references to rock and metal music, such as Tool lyrics appearing as graffiti on the in-game walls. Additionally, the Swedish melodic death metal band The Duskfall makes appearances via their music video for "Shoot It In" are shown on in-game television sets.

== Reception ==
Reception

Aggregate score
Aggregator	Score	
Aggregator	PS3	Xbox 360
Metacritic	80/100	82/100

Review scores
Publication	Score	
Publication	PS3	Xbox 360
Edge	7/10	N/A
Electronic Gaming Monthly	8/10	8/10
Eurogamer	N/A	8/10
Famitsu	N/A	30/40
Game Informer	8.75/10	8.75/10
GamePro	N/A	3.75/5
GameRevolution	B−	B−
GameSpot	8.5/10	8.5/10
GameSpy	4/5	4/5
GameTrailers	8.2/10	8.2/10
GameZone	8.5/10	8.5/10
IGN	7.8/10	(US) 7.8/10 (AU) 7.3/10
Official Xbox Magazine (US)	N/A	8/10
PlayStation: The Official Magazine	9/10	N/A
The A.V. Club	C	C
The New York Times	(favorable)	(favorable)

The Darkness received "favorable" reviews on both platforms according to the review aggregation website Metacritic. Hyper's Daniel Wilks commended the game for its "brilliant storytelling, looking great and excellent level design". On the other hand, he criticised its "weak physics engine and some AI problems". Famitsu gave the former console version a score of two eights and two sevens for a total of 30 out of 40.

411Mania gave the Xbox 360 version a score of 8.7 out of 10 and called it "the kind of shooter that I enjoy. It is built around more than just shooting. It gives you a wide range of powers with which to play. It gives you people to interact with. It gives you a story that is worth caring about. And it makes you feel as if you are The Darkness itself. However, because of the relative brevity of its content, some basic bugs and flaws that are still present, and the minor annoyances of the controls of Jackie's powers, it is far from perfect. This is pretty much a must play shooter, if not quite the classic I was hoping for". The New York Times gave the game a favorable review and said that "part of [the game's] charm is its wealth of extravagant, often irrelevant detail". The A.V. Club gave it a C and called it "an overreaching, frequently clumsy genre hybrid with moments of brilliance".

During the 11th Annual Interactive Achievement Awards, the Academy of Interactive Arts & Sciences nominated The Darkness for "Outstanding Achievement in Story Development".

The Darkness has sold over a million units worldwide. The Media Development Authority of Singapore previously banned the game for excessive violence and religiously offensive expletives.
