= Payday 3 =

2023 video game

- Developer: Starbreeze Studios
- Publishers: Deep Silver(Former); Starbreeze Studios(present)
- Director: Miodrag Kovačević
- Composer: Gustavo Coutinho
- Series: Payday
- Engine: Unreal Engine 5
- Platforms: PlayStation 5; Windows; Xbox Series X/S
- Release: 21 September 2023
- Genre: First-person shooter
- Modes: Single-player, multiplayer

Payday 3 is a 2023 cooperative first-person shooter game developed and published by Starbreeze Studios. The game was formerly published by Deep Silver. The game is a sequel to Payday 2, and is the third installment in the Payday series. It was released for PlayStation 5, Windows, and Xbox Series X/S on 21 September 2023.

The game takes place after the ending of Payday 2 where the Payday Gang went separate ways and left their criminal lives, but being double-crossed and losing all of their money causes the Payday Gang to return to the life of crime. The original crew of characters originating from Payday: The Heist ("Dallas", "Chains", "Wolf", and "Hoxton") return, with five other characters, four returning from Payday 2 ("Joy", "Houston", "Clover", "Jacket"), and one new character ("Pearl"), appearing as playable characters. It takes place mainly in New York and its surroundings in the 2020s, intended to add more depth to the Payday Gang's crimes with game-changing differences like more advanced surveillance or the rise of cryptocurrency.

The game received mixed reviews from critics and failed to meet the sales expectations of Starbreeze and Embracer Group.

== Plot ==
Payday 3 follows the events of Payday 2. The gang is forced out of retirement by a conspiracy plot aimed at its members, including an assassination attempt and the freezing of their assets. The new Crime.net operator, Shade, who managed to contact only five members of the crew, helps them to track down the perpetrators and locate the surviving members of the gang, while providing them jobs in and around New York City, including a bank, armored transport and a jewelry store. Through Shade, the crew also meets Pearl, an experienced con artist, who joins the Payday gang.

== Development ==
Developer Starbreeze Studios announced in May 2016 that Payday 3 was in development at Overkill Software, after Starbreeze acquired the rights to the intellectual property from 505 Games for around US$30 million. In March 2021, Plaion committed to pay €50 million to assist in the game's development and marketing, including more than 18 months of post-launch support using the games as a service model. Payday 3 was developed using Unreal Engine 4, but was upgraded to use Unreal Engine 5 on August 2026. On January 1, 2023, a teaser trailer titled A New Criminal Dawn was released, revealing its logo. Console versions are also the same version as the game on PC platforms, unlike its predecessor. Overkill states that this is due to the game being created using the Unreal Engine. In June, Overkill announced that the game would release on September 18, 2023 for people who had pre-ordered the Silver and Gold editions, while the standard edition would release on September 21.

== Reception ==
=== Critical response ===
Reception

Aggregate score
Aggregator	Score
Metacritic	PC: 66/100; PS5: 61/100; XBOX: 67/100

Review scores
Publication	Score
Digital Trends	3.5/5
Eurogamer	3/5
Famitsu	30/40
IGN	7/10

Payday 3 received "mixed or average" reviews from critics, according to review aggregator website Metacritic. In Japan, four critics from Famitsu gave the game a total score of 30 out of 40.

Vikki Blake, writing for Eurogamer, called it "a shallow shooter that doesn't offer anywhere near enough bang for your ill-gotten buck." Travis Northup, writing for IGN, wrote that "Payday 3's cooperative heists are off to a strong start, even if the vault is a bit bare at the moment." Giovanni Colantonio, in a review for Digital Trends, said that "Payday 3 doesn't shake up its predecessor's formula much, but a strong batch of initial heists sets the live service shooter up for success."

=== Launch ===
Upon launch, the game's servers failed due to the massive influx of players, making the game almost unplayable, since the game is online-only. The outages lasted for days. Starbreeze announced that the game had attracted more than 1.3 million players at launch.

=== Sales ===
Payday 3 became the fifth and the sixth best-selling video game in the United States and the United Kingdom respectively in September 2023.

One month after launch, the player base on Steam plummeted, with Payday 2 having 10 times more concurrent players than Payday 3 on said distribution platform.

In November 2023, Embracer Group (owner of Deep Silver) said that Payday 3 had failed to meet their sales expectations.

In February 2024, Starbreeze said that the game's sales and player activity were way below expectations. In March 2024, Starbreeze fired CEO Tobias Sjögren and replaced him with Juergen Goeldner as interim CEO. On May 15, 2024, Mats Juhl replaced Juergen Goeldner to become acting CEO of Starbreeze. In September 2024, it was announced that game director Miodrag Kovačevićas had been removed from his role in preparation for the game's second year, with Andreas Häll Penninger (lead producer on Payday 3) and Almir Listo (Starbreeze's Global Brand Director) becoming interim game directors.

On a 'Heist with Almir' stream in November 2024, Mats Juhl (Starbreeze's CFO and acting CEO) said that "so far, the game [Payday 3] hasn't made any profits".

On March 31, 2025, Adolf Kristjansson was appointed as the new CEO of Starbreeze and assumed his position on April 1, 2025.

In May 2025, Starbreeze announced it had acquired publishing rights from Plaion.
