= Payday: The Heist =

2011 video game

- Developer: Overkill Software
- Publisher: Sony Online Entertainment
- Designer: Ulf Andersson
- Composer: Simon Viklund
- Series: Payday
- Engine: Diesel
- Platforms: PlayStation 3; Windows
- Release: 18 October 2011: PlayStation 3; NA: 18 October 2011; EU: 2 November 2011; Microsoft Windows; WW: 20 October 2011
- Genre: First-person shooter
- Modes: Single-player; multiplayer

Payday: The Heist is a cooperative first-person shooter game developed by Overkill Software and published by Sony Online Entertainment. The game was released for the PlayStation 3 in North America on 18 October 2011, and in Europe on 2 November. It was released then for Windows on 20 October. It is the first game in the Payday series.

Payday: The Heist runs on the Diesel game engine. The game contains seven different missions (including the free No Mercy downloadable content (DLC) released on 25 July 2012), with each mission containing random elements which alter the gameplay in subtle ways with the aim of enhancing replayability. The Wolf Pack DLC was released on PlayStation 3 and PC in August 2012. This DLC added two heists, (in total making the mission amount nine) additional weapons, increased level cap, and a player upgrade tree.

== Gameplay ==
In Payday: The Heist, players use a variety of firearms to complete objectives (usually centered around stealing a certain object, person, or a particular amount of money). The game plays from the first person perspective, but offers a few twists on the standard FPS formula. Killing civilians is punished, instead players may take a limited number as hostages. Should any player get taken into custody (after taking enough damage and not being "revived" in time, or getting downed too many times) during the heist, one of their teammates may release a hostage, allowing a trade to take place which allows a single player to be released. While playing the levels, players will notice a lot of variation in a single level, as there are often a large number of random events programmed in. An example of this is the location of the bank manager in First World Bank.

The game focuses on four robbers (Dallas, Hoxton, Chains, and Wolf) who team up. Their first heist took place at the First World Bank, where they entered a vault by using thermite hidden on the inside of a photocopier and stole a large amount of money.

== Downloadable content ==
Overkill Software released two DLC packs for the game; the first one is the Wolfpack DLC, which was released on 1 August on the European PlayStation Store and on 7 August for the North American PlayStation Store and PC. The new content included a new Technician skill tree that gave players access to the AK, the GL40 and the Stryk pistol as well as adding in a deployable sentry gun. Also included were two new heists, Counterfeit and Undercover. On 25 July, the No Mercy Hospital DLC was released, establishing a link between the Left 4 Dead and Payday series (although this has been stated to be non-canon). This DLC included the No Mercy heist as well as the Infected mask set for players with Left 4 Dead installed on their computers. Payday: The Heist was free on Steam for 24 hours in October 2014.

== Reception ==
Reception

Aggregate score
Aggregator	Score
Metacritic	(PS3) 70/100 (PC) 76/100

Review scores
Publication	Score
Computer Games Magazine	5/10
Destructoid	7.5/10
Eurogamer	8/10
GameSpot	7.5/10
GamesRadar+	4/5
Giant Bomb	3/5
IGN	7.5/10

Payday: The Heist received "mixed or average" reviews from critics for the PS3 version, while the PC version received "generally favorable" reviews, according to review aggregator website Metacritic.

=== Sales ===
By October 2012, Payday: The Heist had sold over 700,000 units. Also, by November 2014, Payday: The Heist and Payday 2 had sold over 9 million units.

== Sequels ==
A sequel, titled Payday 2 was released for PlayStation 3, Windows, and Xbox 360 in August 2013. In the following years, the Payday: The Heist maps have been added to Payday 2.

After Starbreeze Studios acquired Overkill Software, Payday 3 was planned. Following Starbreeze's restructuring plan due to financial difficulties in 2018, Starbreeze stated that they planned to release Payday 3 by 2023. The game was released for PlayStation 5, Windows, and Xbox Series X/S in September 2023.
