= Payday 2 =

2013 video game

- Developers: Overkill Software; Sidetrack Games (Note: PC version supported by Sidetrack Games since October 2025.)
- Publishers: 505 Games (former); Starbreeze Studios
- Director: David Goldfarb
- Producer: Almir Listo
- Designer: Ulf Andersson
- Programmers: George Giannakos; Martin Waern
- Artist: Tomislav Spajic
- Composers: Simon Viklund (2013-2016) (Note: Viklund left Overkill in 2015, but remained the game's main composer through 2016 while working as a freelancer. He continued to occasionally compose tracks for the game thereafter until 2018.); Carl Norén (2016-2017); Gustavo Coutinho (2018-2023); Le Castle Vania (Note: Composed Fully Loaded Epic Win, Infinite Ammo and Use of Force in 2015, later Confirmed Thrills and Operation Black Light in 2018)
- Series: Payday
- Engine: Diesel Engine 2.0; Diesel Engine 3.0 (since 2026)
- Platforms: Windows; PlayStation 3; Xbox 360; PlayStation 4; Xbox One; Linux; Nintendo Switch
- Release: 13 August 2013: Microsoft Windows; WW: 13 August 2013; PlayStation 3, Xbox 360; NA: 13 August 2013; EU: 16 August 2013; PlayStation 4, Xbox One; EU: 12 June 2015; NA: 16 June 2015; Linux; WW: 21 March 2016; Nintendo Switch; EU: 23 February 2018; NA: 27 February 2018
- Genres: First-person shooter; Stealth
- Modes: Single-player; Multiplayer

Payday 2 is a cooperative first-person shooter video game developed by Overkill Software and published by 505 Games. The game is a sequel to 2011's Payday: The Heist, and the second game in the Payday series. It was released in August 2013 for Windows, PlayStation 3 and Xbox 360. An enhanced version of the game, subtitled Crimewave Edition, was released for PlayStation 4 and Xbox One in June 2015 and for the Nintendo Switch in February 2018.

Two years after the events of the previous game, the Payday gang comes to the Washington, D.C., metropolitan area to perform another heisting spree. The player takes control of one of the gang's twenty-two members and can perform heists alone, or with up to three teammates. The player can participate in a variety of heists, including but not limited to robberies of banks, shops and armored cars, and producing and distributing narcotics. The game differs from the previous by allowing much more customization of the player (aesthetically and gameplay-wise), somewhat improved graphical interface and experience, more variety and playability in levels, and has reworked stealth mechanics.

An accompanying web series was produced to promote the game. The game was profitable from pre-orders alone and received positive reviews. Payday 2: Crimewave Edition which offers improved graphics, new content and some downloadable content, was released for PlayStation 4 and Xbox One in June 2015.

A sequel, titled Payday 3, developed by Starbreeze Studios and published by Deep Silver, was released on 21 September 2023.

== Gameplay ==
A screenshot of a player engaging with enemies during an assault wave in a bank heist

The game consists of a variety of heists that the player can opt to either carry out by themselves, with the AI; or as part of a multiplayer game. There are heists such as bank robberies, drug trafficking runs, rigging an election, or stealing smuggled nuclear warheads. Some of the heists put a large emphasis on stealth, often leading to bonus experience points and money on completion, and certain heists can only be done in stealth.

The level selection menu is styled as a fictional website, Crime.net, where missions pop up periodically as contracts in a map of Washington, D.C. The player can pick up an open contract, join a contract another player has started, or buy a contract with in-game money in an offshore bank account. There are seven difficulty levels: Normal, Hard, Very Hard, Overkill, Mayhem, Death Wish, and Death Sentence, with increased money and experience payouts for higher difficulty levels. Some contracts in Payday 2 take place over multiple days, with each day represented by a separate level with different objectives. After certain days of heists are completed in 'loud' (in which the alarm has sounded) the game may add an escape level, where the players' original escape is thwarted and they must survive to reach their backup getaway.

Many jobs in Payday 2 can be completed in stealth. If the player can avoid getting caught on camera, evade or silently kill security guards, do not kill more than four guards with pagers and keep any civilian witnesses from calling the police, the alarm will not be raised and the players will receive an experience bonus. Otherwise, players will have to achieve their objectives, carry out any loot they find to a drop-off point, and reach their escape point under the pressure of constant police assault waves. Most of the enemies are SWAT units sourced from D.C. police, then FBI SWAT, GenSec private security contractors and finally the Department of Homeland Security (referred to in-game as the "Department of Homeland Surveillance") as difficulty increases. Mixed in with these are special units; all versions of Payday 2 include the "Shield" and the "Taser" - both named for their signature equipment, the "Bulldozer" - a SWAT team member in a modified near-bulletproof bomb suit, snipers, and the "Cloaker" - an infiltration and hand-to-hand combat expert. Exclusive to the PC and Crimewave editions are near-indestructible SWAT van turrets, capable of area denial, a medic capable of returning an enforcer to full health with no status effects, and Captain Winters, a well-protected veteran police officer who sustains assaults and buffs enemies until he can be driven off.

If the player takes too much damage they will be knocked down and incapacitated. If no one helps them back up, or if they are downed a number of times without healing up via a Doctor Bag, they will be taken into custody. On lower difficulty levels players in custody will eventually come out of custody after a set time period, but otherwise, their teammates must take a hostage to trade to get them back into the game. A job is failed if all players are downed or in custody, or reaching a heist-specific fail condition.

Players can use skill points to obtain various abilities and bonuses on skill trees representing five criminal archetypes and playstyles. The Mastermind skill tree is pictured in this screenshot.

At the end of each heist, the player is presented with a screen with three cards, one of which is to be chosen by the player (called a "Payday"). These bonus cards can be weapon modifications, masks, weapon skins, colors or materials for masks, bonus experience, or money. The player can purchase and customize masks, although these are purely cosmetic and have no effect on the gameplay.

Throughout the game, the player accumulates money and experience. The money is divided into two parts. 20% of the money is given to the player to spend on weapons and masks and 80% is placed into the player's offshore account, which is intended as part of the story to be the player's retirement fund, however, the player can use it to purchase heists from a broker, to buy bonus cards without performing a heist, to become infamous, or a player can press a button in their safehouse to burn all of it.

During the 4th day of "The Search For Kento" event the Crime Spree game mode was added, in which players complete heists consecutively to earn large rewards. As the player completes heists, their crime spree rank increases, with the number of ranks earned varying depending on the heist chosen. As the player's rank increases, they must choose modifiers that make the heists increasingly difficult. Players can start at rank zero or pay continental coins to start at higher levels. When choosing a heist, players are given three choices, and the option to reroll the choices for continental coins. Players can choose to end their crime spree at any level and claim their rewards. If a player fails a heist, or their game closes during the heist for whatever reason, their crime spree will end; they can choose to either pay continental coins to resume the crime spree or end it and take the rewards. During the pre-planning of the heists, certain "Gage Perks" can be purchased with continental coins to provide players with buffs.

As players earn experience points, their reputation level increases. When a player's level increases they earn skill points, allowing them to buy abilities and bonuses from skill trees representing five of the playable heisters and playstyles: The "Mastermind" tree, containing healing, crowd control, and precision focused skills, refers to Dallas. The "Enforcer" tree, containing shotgun, armor, and ammo skills refers to Chains. The "Technician" tree, containing turret, trip mine, drill, and automatic weapon skills refers to Wolf. The "Ghost" Tree, containing stealth, ECM, dodging, and crit skills refers to Houston. The "Fugitive" tree, containing melee, bleedout, and pistol skills refers to Hoxton. They have two stages: Basic and Aced It is not possible to max out every single tree and players are often encouraged to mix and match skills from each tree to maximize usefulness. Players also receive "perk points," in proportion to their experience, that can be used to unlock additional bonuses from 22 "perk decks", also based on the playable heisters. Players can switch between 15 profiles of skills, perk decks, weapons and equipment at no cost before starting a heist.

When a player reaches level 100, they can opt to raise their "Infamy" level, up to level 500. Becoming Infamous grants a player access to special items, a permanent bonus to all gained experience, and gives them special poses in lobby screens. However, raising one's Infamy level causes them to lose all of their spending money and experience, and a sum of $200,000,000 is deducted from their offshore account until they reach Infamy level 5.

== Plot ==
Payday 2 follows the events of Payday: The Heist, with three of the crew members – Dallas (portrayed by Eric Etebari, voiced by Simon Kerr), Wolf (Ulf Andersson), and Chains (Damion Poitier) – as well as their operator Bain (Simon Viklund) returning. Hoxton (portrayed by Josh Lenn, voiced by Pete Gold), the fourth member in the previous game, has been arrested by the FBI and replaced by Dallas' brother Houston (Derek Ray).

After a brief hiatus from criminal activity, the Payday gang starts completing jobs in and around Washington, D.C., for Bain and other criminal contractors, such as bank robberies, drug trafficking, eliminating rivals and rigging elections. This catches the eye of "The Dentist" (Giancarlo Esposito), a middleman for a number of wealthy clients, who offers to help break Hoxton out.

The gang proves their capability to the Dentist by successfully robbing a bank thought to be impenetrable, and the plan is set in motion: Hoxton is managed to be given a retrial which gives the gang an opportunity to intersect and take him from custody, followed by breaking into FBI headquarters to find out who double-crossed him. This is revealed to be Hector Morales, one of the contractors, who made a deal with the FBI in exchange for protection; the gang raids his safehouse and kills him. The Dentist's final job for the gang is to steal a mysterious box in the vault of a large casino.

Throughout this time, the gang took on larger contracts, which included stealing a famous and valuable diamond, retrieving nuclear weaponry, and infiltrating highly guarded establishments, as well as recruiting more members. Law enforcement and government officials grow frustrated with the increasing crime rate; in spite of their efforts, the gang remains elusive.

A new contractor, former private military company Murkywater major Locke (Ian Russell), enlists the gang's help before double-crossing them. Later, while attempting to get back at him, Bain is captured by an unknown group but tells the gang to trust Locke; the betrayal was a cover for their benefit. With Locke's help, they attempt to find out who captured Bain and why. This is revealed to be the Dentist with the help of Murkywater, and the gang discovers more artifacts linked to the Dentist's mysterious box.

Figuring out Bain's location, the gang frees him but finds out he has been infected with a lethal man-made virus. Before his demise, he sees the gang carry out their final grand heist: infiltrate the White House and steal valid unused Presidential pardons to get away with all their criminal past. Later, Locke and the gang (now up to 22 members) hold a solemn ceremony for Bain, before everyone but Dallas disposes of their mask.

In an alternate ending, unlocked by fulfilling certain requirements and solving an elaborate puzzle, the gang finds a secret vault underneath the White House, housing an ancient machine: the Ark of the Watcher. Locke and Bain follow the gang, held hostage by the Dentist, who is killed by the gang. The machine is activated and the room lights up, with Bain thanking everyone and supposedly dying. Later, somewhere on vacation, the gang celebrates and sees the President of the United States on television holding a speech; it is implied that the ark allowed Bain to switch bodies with the president, which allowed them to get away with "The greatest heist of all", that being stealing America.

== Downloadable content ==
Since release, over seventy downloadable content (DLC) packages have been released for the game including new heists, weapons and game mechanics. The first weapon pack DLCs were mostly named after the gang's arms dealer, Gage, who was introduced in the Payday webseries used to promote the game. Three weapon packs such as the "BBQ Pack" were introduced through a new contract character, the Butcher. Additional weapon packs were added such as the Fugitive and Gunslinger weapon packs.

Payday 2: Hotline Miami is a collaborative project between Dennaton Games and Overkill, including a heist influenced by Hotline Miami. The "John Wick Pack" is a collaboration between Lionsgate and Overkill to bring the titular character from the film John Wick to Payday 2. In 2015, a second Lionsgate collaboration featuring Point Break was released containing two heists ("Beneath the Mountain" and "Birth of Sky") and Bodhi, a character inspired by the film. Overkill collaborated with the Swedish DJ Alesso in creating "The Alesso Heist" which takes place in a fictional Alesso concert and features a dedicated track by Alesso titled "Payday".

The "Goat Simulator Heist" was added on 14 January 2016, in collaboration with Goat Simulator developer Coffee Stain Studios. Packs based on the movie Scarface were added on 15 December 2016: the "Scarface Heist Pack" and the "Scarface Character Pack", the latter of which includes Tony Montana as a playable character. The "Hardcore Henry Packs", based on the movie Hardcore Henry, were added to Payday 2 on 24 March 2016. These Packs were split up into two DLC; the "Jimmy Character Pack", and the "Hardcore Henry Heists".

On 31 January 2017, Overkill released a Payday 2 crossover with Shadow Warrior 2, which included a Steam sale on both games, sale on some DLC for Payday 2, and new masks and melee weapons. On 14 December 2017, Overkill released a heist based on the Quentin Tarantino film Reservoir Dogs. In this heist, the player is contracted to rob a jewelry store in Los Angeles with the Cabot family. The heist is unique in that its days are played in reverse order, with day two occurring prior to day one. This reflects the film's nonlinear narrative.

Development of further Payday 2 content was halted in December 2018, amid financial troubles at Overkill's parent company Starbreeze Studios. After Starbreeze had gone through a lengthy restructuring process, it announced in October 2019 that Overkill would resume previously halted work on the game, and produce new paid DLC. As of June 2023, 12 DLC heists have been added: Border Crossing, San Martín Bank, Breakfast in Tijuana, Buluc's Mansion, Dragon Heist, Ukrainian Prisoner, Black Cat, Mountain Master, Midland Ranch, Lost in Transit, Hostile Takeover and Crude Awakening along with additional content packs such as weapon packs and other cosmetics.

In October 2021, Starbreeze collaborated with Luke Millanta to create and release the Spooky Scary Halloween Update, a collection of Halloween-themed player suits, masks and weapon charms.

== Crimewave Edition ==
Announced for the Xbox One and PlayStation 4, the Crimewave Edition of Payday 2 includes many features and add-ons from the PC version of the game. It was released in June 2015. It includes all of the aforementioned DLC and graphical enhancements such as an improved framerate and texture quality. Overkill have stated that future updates will not arrive on the PlayStation 3 and Xbox 360 citing hardware limitations as the reason. In 2016, Payday 2: The Big Score was released for the PS4 and Xbox One, containing all of 2015's DLC. In December 2019, Crimewave Edition received its final content update, "Winds of Change", which aimed to bring the game closer to the PC edition before ending support.

== Reception ==
=== Critical reception ===
Reception

Aggregate score
Aggregator	Score					
Aggregator	NS	PC	PS3	PS4	Xbox 360	Xbox One
Metacritic	60/100	79/100	74/100	71/100	75/100	65/100

Review scores
Publication	Score					
Publication	NS	PC	PS3	PS4	Xbox 360	Xbox One
Computer and Video Games					8/10	
Eurogamer					8/10	
Game Informer		8.25/10	8.25/10	7/10	8.25/10	4/5
GamesRadar+		3.5/5	3.5/5	3/5	3.5/5	3/5
IGN		8.0/10	8.0/10		8.0/10	
Joystiq		4/5	4/5		4/5	
PC Gamer (US)		79/100				

Payday 2 has received generally positive reviews from critics with general praise from the cooperative elements, but heavy criticism for the friendly AI. Vince Ingenito of IGN praised its cooperative gameplay, stealth mechanics and sound design, but was not as impressed at graphical quality. David Hinkle of Joystiq was impressed at the depth of customization, level progression and random elements. Dan Whitehead of Eurogamer stated that "When all its clunky gear suddenly align, the result remains phenomenal: a combination of Left 4 Dead's randomly generated mayhem and the muscular precision of a hardcore shooter, topped off with the big screen frisson of being the smart-suited, fright-masked guy with the AK, ordering the hostages onto the floor or standing in the street, holding off the SWAT team in a flurry of cordite and thunder." Craig Owens of PC Gamer concluded that this game is a "smart co-op shooting slightly undermined by poor stealth mechanics and dogged insistence on withholding the best toys".

=== Controversy ===
On 15 October 2015 as part of Overkill's second annual Crimefest celebration, Overkill announced the addition of safes to the card drop system that contained weapon skins, some of which modified weapon statistics. The safes needed to be opened with drills which were only available for purchase with real world currency, leading a fan backlash to their inclusion. On 20 October 2015 the aforementioned drills were added to the card drop system, however this did not quell the backlash and Overkill was criticized for poor management of the controversy and silence to the press.

On 11 November 2015 Overkill announced the contents of a previously sold DLC investment called the "Completely Overkill Pack" would be four unique masks with special cosmetic effects and a single random skin unique to said pack with a special EXP or Money boost for the team, after promising originally that the contents of the pack will be completely cosmetic. They also announced that seven other DLC packs would be made available for free to owners of the pack, but again, fans backlashed against this seemingly unfair revelation, including the people who bought the Completely Overkill Pack, as the store page for the pack declared it would not contain one of the DLC packs it ultimately contained, and it left the people who bought both the Completely Overkill and Overkill packs feeling short-changed, with some even refunding the Completely Overkill Pack. In response, Steam community moderators for Payday started a protest against this treatment abuse by fans by refusing to moderate the community until granted an interview with Almir Listo, producer of the game. Overkill later added 10 more unique masks to the pack as an apology.

On 30 May 2016 Starbreeze Studios announced that they had acquired the rights to the Payday franchise. They also stated that future safes would be completely free to open.

=== Sales ===
Payday 2 is Overkill's first game to have a boxed retail release. The director of Payday 2, David Goldfarb, stated that "Payday 2 has become just too big to reserve release on Xbox Live and PlayStation Network alone." Reports of strong sales in the first week and shortages led 505 Games to work with retailers in distributing more copies of the game. The game was still distributed through the PlayStation Network, Xbox Live and Steam services as planned.

On 8 August 2013, just under a week before launch, Starbreeze Studios confirmed that the game was profitable from pre-orders, covering all of the money invested by the publisher 505 Games. All new profit will be divided between the studio and publisher.

As of January 2023, Payday 2 has sold over 40 million copies.

As part of its reported restructuring plan following financial difficulties in 2018, due to Overkill's The Walking Dead commercial failure and costly development, Starbreeze stated that they plan to release Payday 3 by 2023.

=== Cancelled Esports ===
A Payday 2 esports tournament was scheduled to be held at DreamHack Summer 2016, but was cancelled.
