= Dollars and Sense (TV program) =

- Genre: Business affairs
- Presented by: Gordon Jones
- Country of origin: Canada
- Original language: English
- No. of seasons: 3

Production
- Executive producers: John Lackie (1972-1974); Doug Lower (1974-1975)
- Running time: 30 minutes

Original release
- Network: CBC Television
- Release: 1 October 1972 – 29 June 1975

Dollars and Sense is a Canadian business affairs television program that aired on CBC Television from 1972 to 1975.

== Premise ==
Gordon Jones hosted this Toronto-produced program concerned business topics including finance and labour.

== Scheduling ==
This half-hour program was broadcast on Sundays at 1:00 p.m. (Eastern) for three seasons. Its first season was from 1 October 1972 to 10 June 1973, its second season was from 30 September 1973 to 16 June 1974 while its third season was shorter, from 5 January to the final episode on 29 June 1975.

== See also ==
- Venture
