= Starbreeze Studios =

Swedish video game company

Starbreeze AB
- Type: Public
- Traded as: Nasdaq Stockholm: STAR A (Class A); Nasdaq Stockholm: STAR B (Class B)
- Industry: Video games
- Founded: 1998; 28 years ago in Härnösand, Sweden
- Founder: Magnus Högdahl
- Headquarters: Stockholm, Sweden
- Key people: Adolf Kristjansson (CEO); Mats Juhl (CFO)
- Revenue: ▲125.689 million kr (2021)
- Operating income: ▼ -53.720 million kr (2021)
- Net income: ▲ -103.468 million kr (2021)
- Total assets: ▼674.147 million kr (2021)
- Total equity: ▼122.817 million kr (2021)
- Owners: Digital Bros (38.77%)
- Number of employees: 138 (2021)
- Subsidiaries: Overkill Software
- Website: starbreeze.com
- Footnotes; 2021 annual report

Starbreeze AB is a Swedish video game developer and publisher based in Stockholm. The studios's notable games developed include The Chronicles of Riddick: Escape from Butcher Bay, Payday 2 and Brothers: A Tale of Two Sons. Founded by members of the demogroup Triton, the company was merged with O3 Games in 2001 and the parent group was renamed to Starbreeze in late 2002. The company produced titles including Enclave and Knights of the Temple: Infernal Crusade. In the early 2000s, cancellations of its projects due to conflicts with publishers and a failed acquisition led to a severe financial crisis, resulting in staff lay-offs during the development of Starbreeze's fourth game, The Chronicles of Riddick: Escape from Butcher Bay. This game received critical acclaim and helped Starbreeze establish a reputation for producing high-quality games. The company worked on The Darkness, whose sales were considered satisfactory.

Starbreeze partnered with Electronic Arts to develop a reboot to the Syndicate series, but it ended up being a commercial failure, and many staff members moved to rival company MachineGames, established by Starbreeze's founders. As a result, the company shifted part of its focus to developing smaller games, such as Brothers: A Tale of Two Sons. Starbreeze began expanding the company in 2012 with its acquisition of Overkill Software. Overkill's first title after the acquisition, Payday 2, helped Starbreeze make a record profit after suffering an accumulated loss of $14.4 million since its inception. In 2015, the company announced that it would start publishing video games from independent developers and that it had begun development of a virtual reality headset named Project Star VR.

Starbreeze had acquired a license to develop Overkill's The Walking Dead from Skybound Entertainment, but the project fell into development hell and once released in 2018, was poorly reviewed and had poor sales; the title was ultimately pulled and Skybound revoked Starbreeze's license. Having expected a financial boon from this game, Starbreeze spent a year in restructuring from December 2018 to December 2019 to regain financial footing, but had to sell off many of its publishing deals and other steps to be able to move forward.

== History ==
=== Founding and merger (1998–2002) ===
Starbreeze Studios was founded by Swedish programmer Magnus Högdahl. Högdahl was a former member of the PC demoscene group Triton, and specialized in making tech demos. He decided to form Starbreeze after his project, an action role-playing game named Into the Shadows, was canceled. He then decided to found his own studio and began crafting his own game engine. He actively recruited staff among his acquaintances and the studio was established in 1998 in Härnösand, Sweden.

Högdahl serving as the company's head and tech lead, was responsible for creating a new game engine for future games, and looking for publishers willing to help publish its games. At that time, the company had only about five employees, and had created a prototype for a video game and pitched it to publishers at E3 1998. Gremlin Interactive agreed to publish the game, and the deal was finalized in late 1998. The company grew to have roughly eleven staff members. The game was a first-person action role-playing game named Sorcery. With a high fantasy setting, the game featured 3D visuals and its gameplay was similar to that of Diablo and Quake. However, Gremlin Interactive was acquired by Infogrames in 2000 and the partnership with Starbreeze dissolved, resulting in the game's cancellation.

O3 Games was founded by Lars Johansson, who also was active in the demoscene. Its first game was The Outforce, a real-time strategy space game that was released in 2000 and subsequently became a success for the company. O3 needed to expand so that it could continue video game development. After Sorcery's cancellation, Starbreeze Studios ran into financial difficulties. Unable to support itself financially, Starbreeze needed to merge with another developer to continue in business. The two companies discussed a merger in Uppsala and merged shortly afterwards in 2001, retaining the name Starbreeze Studios. The parent owner, formerly O3 Games, was officially renamed as Starbreeze AB in November 27, 2002, with Starbreeze Studios AB still as a subsidiary developer under it.

=== Post-merger (2002–2009) ===
After the merger, the company began working on Enclave, a medieval fantasy, multiplayer-only video game inspired by Team Fortress. The game also became the company's first project with international appeal, enabling Starbreeze to partner with various publishers including Swing Entertainment, Conspiracy Entertainment, and Vivendi. However, Swing Entertainment faced bankruptcy at that time, and decided to turn the game into a single-player action-adventure video game with the goal of sending it to market as soon as possible. The game was released in 2002, and Starbreeze had to lay off staff after its release. Enclave II was also in development. The sequel was said to feature a more elaborate story, 28 different maps, 10 playable characters, and an improved fighting system. However, these features were axed when Starbreeze got into legal troubles with the publisher, resulting in the game's cancellation. Another game, Knights of the Temple: Infernal Crusade, was successfully released with help from publisher TDK Mediactive. However its sequel was shifted to another developer. Starbreeze attempted to acquire another studio, Rock Solid Games, but the agreement between the two fell apart and brought both companies financial problems.

"The company was shutting down around us. This is something I'm not very proud of, but [the Riddick team] actually cut ourselves off from the rest of the company. We moved to the third floor...we knew that people were getting fired upstairs and everything. But we just sort of closed the doors, we didn't talk about it, and we just stayed focused on finishing the game

— Jens Andersson, lead designer of The Chronicles of Riddick: Escape from Butcher Bay

Another project being worked on by Starbreeze at that time was The Chronicles of Riddick: Escape from Butcher Bay. Set in The Chronicles of Riddick movie universe, the game was published by Vivendi. The team took inspiration from films such as Escape from Alcatraz and video games such as GoldenEye 007 and the Tom Clancy's Splinter Cell series. However, the company was downsizing due to its financial problems and the number of employees dropped from 80 to 25, and the entire development team moved away from the main Starbreeze floor to prevent it from being affected by low morale, and to allow it to focus on the game's development. The game enjoyed an 18-month development cycle, which was significantly longer than typical licensed games. A PlayStation 2 version of the game was also in development, but was ultimately canceled as the then head of Vivendi's publishing division, Michael Pole, ordered its cancellation to "make his mark". Universal Motion Pictures intervened and kept the game's Xbox version. Escape from Butcher Bay received critical acclaim upon its launch, with many critics regarding it as one of the best licensed games ever made. Its gameplay elements, including puzzle-solving and stealth, and its ahead-of-its-time visuals, also received praise from critics. Despite receiving critical acclaim, it was not a commercial success for Starbreeze.

After the release of Escape from Butcher Bay, Starbreeze again encountered financial difficulties after having not received a significant royalty payment from Vivendi. It sold part of its motion capture and animation department to a British company, Centroid. However, the game helped set Starbreeze's reputation as a studio capable of making good licensed titles. With the help of Union Entertainment, an intermediary company, Starbreeze signed an agreement with Majesco for a new title set within The Darkness universe owned by Top Cow Comics on July 16, 2004. Midway through the game's development, Majesco underwent restructuring because of financial difficulties, shifted its focus, and dropped the game. 2K Games stepped up and acquired the publishing rights. 2K extended the game's development cycle, and asked Starbreeze to develop a multiplayer mode for the game. The Darkness was released in 2007. It fared worse than the team expected critically, but its commercial performance was satisfactory, selling more than 1 million copies worldwide.

After working on two different licensed games, the team intended to develop its own games. A game named Kano, involving mind-reading, was started but was never completed. After the release of The Darkness, the company signed a two-project contract with Vivendi. One of the games was a new property known as Polaris. The game was set in a post-apocalyptic environment. Players were tasked to overcome snowstorms, and defeat terrorists and monsters cooperatively with other players. Vivendi was not convinced the game would succeed and adjusted the contract to a remake of Escape from Butcher Bay, The Chronicles of Riddick: Assault on Dark Athena. Vivendi originally named the game Riddick 2 but Starbreeze disagreed claiming the name would raise expectations among gamers that the remake might not be able to deliver. Vivendi's subsidiary Sierra Entertainment was set to publish the game. After the merger between Activision and Vivendi, the new company began streamlining Vivendi and put the game, along with Brütal Legend, and Ghostbusters: The Video Game up for sale. Atari eventually acquired the publishing rights and the game was released in 2009.

=== Syndicate, Payday 2 and Brothers (2010–2016) ===
Starbreeze then partnered with Electronic Arts for two different games, one was known as Project Redlime, while the other was an action-adventure video game set within the Bourne universe. The Bourne game was canceled as a direct result of Matt Damon and director Paul Greengrass not participating in the fourth Bourne film. Project Redlime had a larger scale than the Bourne game. It was said to be a reinvention of one of Electronic Arts' franchises. The company shifted from a technology-orientated company to focus more on the core gameplay mechanics of its new project. Syndicate was announced in September 2011. The game suffered from a troubled development, with Starbreeze completely reworking the game one year after its initial development. There were also many creative differences between the developer and the publisher, and the two companies suffered from an inharmonious relationship. During the game's development, seven senior members of the company, including Högdahl, left to form their own smaller studio. Some of them formed MachineGames to work on their own original games. With a budget that was less than other typical AAA video games, Syndicate received average reviews and was a commercial failure. Grefberg left the company after the game's completion, and 25 employees were laid off.

Many employees left Starbreeze when MachineGames recruited. Then CEO Johan Kristiansson also stepped down, and was replaced by Mikael Nemark. Nemark took the studio in a new direction. Besides focusing on AAA video games, it would also allocate resources to develop smaller, downloadable games in order to broaden the company's portfolio. These new games would no longer use the engine created by Högdahl. In 2011, Starbreeze announced that it was partnering with Epic Games to use its engine, Unreal Engine, for its first small titles. In 2012, Starbreeze announced Cold Mercury, a free-to-play video game and a project codenamed P13. Prior to that, Josef Fares, an award-winning Swedish director, had been unsuccessfully pitching game ideas to several Swedish developers. Starbreeze was in need of new, original properties, and accepted Fares' pitch. P13 later became Brothers: A Tale of Two Sons. Focusing on creating an emotional and "personal" experience, Starbreeze partnered with publisher 505 Games to publish the game. It was released in 2013 to critical acclaim and received numerous awards and accolades. The rights to the Brothers intellectual property was later acquired by 505 Games in 2015. After the success of Brothers, Fares announced that he had established a new studio named Hazelight and is working on a project with Electronic Arts.

In 2012, Starbreeze also announced that it had acquired Overkill Software, the developer of Payday: The Heist, granting it rights to all of Overkill's proprietary technology and intellectual properties. At the time, Overkill was working on the sequel, Payday 2, a game that was set to "broaden the Payday template". While officially, Starbreeze became Overkill's parent company, those close to the situation, speaking to Eurogamer, stated that it was more that Overkill's investors, which including Overkill's founders, brothers Bo and Ulf Andersson, became Starbreeze's majority shareholders; this deal had been made to help infuse cash into both the struggling Starbreeze and to provide funds for Overkill to pursue Payday 2. Payday 2 was a massive commercial success, and was profitable from pre-order sales alone. Payday 2 also became Starbreeze's best selling game of all time, and helped the company to make a record profit for the first time after suffering an accumulated loss of $14.4 million between 1998 and June 2013. The game's success also prompted publisher 505 Games to invest $5 million in Starbreeze in March 2015 to continue to improve and develop additional content for Payday 2 over twenty months. The game was ported to PlayStation 4 and Xbox One under the title Payday 2: Crimewave Edition. Starbreeze moved its offices from Uppsala to Overkill's offices in Stockholm, and Bo Andersson was named CEO of Starbreeze in 2013 following the acquisition of Overkill.

=== Debut as a publisher and acquisitions (2014–2017) ===
Starting in 2014 Starbreeze began broadening its business as a publisher. On September 25, 2014, Starbreeze Studios announced that they had acquired a Los Angeles-based studio called Geminose for $7 million. The studio is currently working on a toys-to-life game. It also announced that it had gained the license for Overkill to make Overkill's The Walking Dead (OTWD), a game set in The Walking Dead universe using gameplay concepts of Payday, with a planned release in 2016. In May 2015, Starbreeze announced that the company would start publishing video games from independent developers. The first independent title set to be published by Starbreeze is Raid: World War II, a four-player, World War II shooter, being developed by Lion Game Lion. During E3 2015, Starbreeze Studios announced Project StarVR, a virtual reality (VR) headset, which is currently under development by InfinitEye, a firm acquired by Starbreeze. They also partnered with IMAX with the creation of IMAX VR "experience centres." The company also acquired Payday Productions and the film rights to Payday in July 2015. The company acquired the under-development Valhalla game engine, a VR-ready platform, in 2015 for around 73 million kr, which was planned to be used for all of its subsequent games.

In February 2016, Starbreeze announced that it would be publishing Dead by Daylight, an asymmetrical, multiplayer, survival horror game developed by Behaviour Interactive. On May that year, 505 Games announced that it had sold the Payday franchise and intellectual property to Starbreeze in exchange for US$30 million worth of stock. Starbreeze also announced that it had acquired the name and the franchises of Cinemaware a day later. On December 16, 2016, the company acquired a 90.5% controlling stake in Indian-based Dhruva Interactive at a price worth $8.5 million

The core Starbreeze team also received investment from Korean publisher Smilegate to develop a new first-person cooperative game set within the Crossfire universe. The studio has engaged in two separate "publishing-only" investments to help publish Psychonauts 2 and System Shock 3 for $8 and $12 million, respectively. In both cases, the respective developers, Double Fine Productions and OtherSide Entertainment, retain all intellectual property rights, while Starbreeze seeks full recovery of its investment and a small amount more from revenues, after which it shares further revenues with the developers.

Starbreeze also published John Wick Chronicles, a John Wick game developed by WEVR and Grab for virtual reality platforms, released in February 2017. In October 2017, Starbreeze sold a 66.7% majority stake in StarVR Corporation to Acer Inc.

=== Economic problems and restructuring (2018–present) ===
Following its announcement in 2015, Starbreeze had placed high emphasis on OTWD to financially support the company alongside Storm, which was merged from Starbreeze's own Cold Mercury. However, OTWD's development suffered from several delays. With the acquisition of the Valhalla engine, OTWD was switched from the Diesel to the Valhalla engine, which proved extremely troublesome to work with and pushed back the release window from 2016 to 2017. By early 2017, the developers were still struggling with Valhalla, and the decision was made to scrap the previous two years of work and restart development anew on the Unreal Engine, while further delaying the game into 2018. Issues related to micromanagement, "crunch time" to get the game out without further delay, and struggles by a significant portion of the Starbreeze and Overkill staff to learn Unreal led to the game being rushed to completion. OTWD's release to personal computers in November 2018 received mixed reviews from critics and underperformed commercially, with only about 100,000 units sold. By February 2019, Skybound Entertainment pulled its licensing contract for OTWD for the game's failure to meet expected standards and quality requirements, officially halting further development of the Windows version and canceling the console ports.

The failure of OTWD prompted Starbreeze to file for reconstruction due to shortage of liquidity in December 2018. Starbreeze also halted ongoing development work for Payday 2 during this period.

CEO Bo Andersson stepped down after filing for reconstruction, with Mikael Nermark replacing as Acting CEO. Bo Andersson together with Kristofer Arwin also resigned from the Board of Directors. Starbreeze's financial crisis drew the attention of the Swedish Economic Crime Authority, as in mid-November 2018, Bo Andersson had sold his shares of Starbreeze for about 18.6 million kr, before Starbreeze's announcement of financial difficulty. Following Starbreeze's reconstruction announcement, the Economic Crime Authority raided several locations, including Starbreeze Headquarters for reasons related to insider trading. Andersson was taken into custody, but was later released and cleared of any charges, as it was found that his bank Carnegie Investment Bank had pressed Andersson into selling the shares. Sebastian Ahlskog, the company's former CFO, was convicted with insider trading charges in February 2020, and was fined approximately 700,000 kr. However, Ahlskog was later acquitted of this conviction in appeals by September 2021.

In the wake of this investigation, Starbreeze's financial situation became dire, and by May 2019 the studio's own estimates were that it lacked sufficient funds to continue operating for the next year. During this period, the studio requested two separate three-month extensions to complete its corporate restructuring. Starbreeze divested itself of several studios and games. OtherSide Entertainment bought out the publication rights for its System Shock 3 in February 2019, while Mohawk Games reacquired publishing rights for 10 Crowns in April. In May 2019, Starbreeze sold its share of Dhruva Interactive to Rockstar Games for US$7.9 million, who subsequently merged Dhurva into its Rockstar India studio. Starbreeze laid off about 60 positions, roughly 25% of its staff, as additional cost-saving measures in June 2019. The same month, Starbreeze sold the publishing rights for Psychonauts 2 to Microsoft for $8 million. A third extension was filed and approved in September 2019, which expired by December 3, 2019.

Starbreeze announced in October 2019 that to resolve its financial situation, it will split off into two new companies: New Starbreeze Publishing AB and New Starbreeze Studios AB. Most of Starbreeze's assets, principally the IP rights to Payday, will reside with the publishing arm. On the assumption that the financial settlement is accepted, the company plans on focusing on release of Payday 3 by 2022-2023 which will be its primary revenue driver. The company also began renewed development on Payday 2 to create new downloadable content, but stated that this would be for purchase, apologizing for reneging on its "forever-free-content" assurance it had made some years prior, with plans to use the revenues to help the company's finances.

Starbreeze's restructuring was completed and approved by the courts by December 2019, about a year after the first financial concerns were raised. Net losses for the year of restructuring were estimated to be about US$12 million. In its financial report released in February 2020 covering this restructuring, Starbreeze stated that it currently was primarily dependent on Payday 2 content sales for revenue and re-stated its intent to release a Payday 3 in the near future for further growth.

The Italian publisher Digital Bros (which also owns Payday 2 publisher 505 Games), announced its intent in January 2020 to acquire the Starbreeze assets at the time held by Smilegate for about US$21.2 million. While Digital Bros was the majority shareholder in Starbreeze, the acquisition of Smilegate's share of Starbreeze would give Digital Bros more control of Starbreeze's development strategy. In March 2020, Mats Juhl was appointed as Starbreeze's chief financial officer, replacing Claes Wenthzel.

Starbreeze announced in October 2020 that Mikael Nermark had resigned as CEO of Starbreeze AB with immediate effect for personal reasons. Starbreeze's Board of Directors appointed Tobias Sjögren as acting CEO and initiated a search process. In March 2021, Tobias Sjögren was appointed permanent CEO of Starbreeze.

Starbreeze signed a €50 million publishing deal with Koch Media in March 2021 that fully financed the remaining development, publishing, and post-launch support of Payday 3, with the game targeted for a 2023 release. Following the release and underperformance of Payday 3, Starbreeze fired Sjögren and installed member of the board Juergen Goeldner as interim CEO.

The company eliminated about 15% of its workforce between November 2024 and January 2025. After several months of rumors, Starbreeze laid off its Paris team in March 2025. In March 2025, Adolf Kristjansson was named as the company's permanent CEO.

== Games ==
=== Games developed ===
Year	Title	Publisher	Platform(s)										
Year	Title	Publisher	PS2	Xbox	Win	GCN	X360	PS3	XBO	PS4	NS	PS5	XBSX/S
2000	The Outforce (Note: Developed by O3 Games prior to O3-Starbreeze merger.)	Strategy First	No	No	Yes	No	No	No	No	No	No	No	No
2002	Enclave	Conspiracy Entertainment	No	Yes	Yes	No	No	No	No	No	No	No	No
2004	Knights of the Temple: Infernal Crusade	TDK Mediactive	Yes	Yes	Yes	Yes	No	No	No	No	No	No	No
2004	The Chronicles of Riddick: Escape from Butcher Bay	Vivendi Games	No	Yes	Yes	No	No	No	No	No	No	No	No
2007	The Darkness	2K Games	No	No	No	No	Yes	Yes	No	No	No	No	No
2009	The Chronicles of Riddick: Assault on Dark Athena	Atari	No	No	Yes	No	Yes	Yes	No	No	No	No	No
2012	Syndicate	Electronic Arts	No	No	Yes	No	Yes	Yes	No	No	No	No	No
2013	Brothers: A Tale of Two Sons	505 Games	No	No	Yes	No	Yes	Yes	Yes	Yes	Yes	No	No
2013	Payday 2 (Note: Mainly developed by Starbreeze's subsidiary Overkill Software.)	505 Games	No	No	Yes	No	Yes	Yes	Yes	Yes	Yes	No	No
2018	Overkill's The Walking Dead	Starbreeze Studios, 505 Games	No	No	Yes	No	No	No	Canceled	Canceled	No	No	No
2023	Payday 3	Deep Silver (Note: Later self-published by Starbreeze Studios)	No	No	Yes	No	No	No	No	No	No	Yes	Yes

=== Games published ===
Year	Title	Developer	Platform(s)		
Year	Title	Developer	Win	XBO	PS4
2016	Dead by Daylight	Behaviour Interactive	Yes (Note: Publisher from 2016 to 2017. Behaviour Interactive acquired publishing rights to the game beginning in 2018.)	Yes (Note: 505 Games is the publisher of the PlayStation 4 and Xbox One versions.)	Yes
2017	John Wick Chronicles	Starbreeze Studios, Grab Games, GamecoStudios, Big Red Button	Yes	No	No
2017	Antisphere	Soap Interactive, Lion Game Lion	Yes	No	No
2017	Raid: World War II	Lion Game Lion	Yes	Yes	Yes
2018	Ape-X VR	LuckyHammers	Yes	No	No
2018	Inked	Somnium Games	Yes	No	No
2024 (Note: Initially released in 2014, officially licensed by Starbreeze in 2024.)	Notoriety: A PAYDAY® Experience	Moonstone Games	Yes	Yes	Yes

=== Cancelled games ===
- Sorcery
- Untitled Dungeons & Dragons game (Project Baxter)
