= Simon Viklund =

Swedish freelance composer and game designer

- Born: Simon Wiklund; December 1, 1979 (age 46); Stockholm, Sweden
- Genre: Electronic
- Occupations: Composer; music producer; sound designer; game designer
- Years active: 2000–Present
- Label: BMG
- Website: www.simonviklund.com

Simon Viklund (born Simon Wiklund, December 1, 1979) is a Swedish video game composer, music producer, sound designer and game designer, who was first known for his work on the 2008 game Bionic Commando Rearmed, in which he was a creative director and composer. He is also known for his work on the Payday series as a composer and the voice of the character Bain.

In 2000, Viklund joined his friend Ulf Andersson's company, Grin, and worked on most of the company's games, which included Bionic Commando: Rearmed. Grin went bankrupt in 2009, leading Viklund, Ulf Andersson and his brother Bo to found Overkill Software. Viklund left Overkill in 2015 to become a freelancer. In 2016, he joined 10 Chambers Collective, another company founded by Ulf Andersson, while continuing his freelance projects.

== Early life ==
Simon Wiklund was born in Stockholm on December 1, 1979. He began learning music through the violin as a child, and later received classical piano lessons for about seven years. He also taught himself to play the guitar and bass guitar. As a teenager he sang in the local church choir, and was briefly a singer in a band established by his friends in high school. He studied arts in high school, but later became more interested in music. Wiklund began to write music in the late 90s with the help of a computer program called FastTracker 2. None of his music was released at the time, because he was personally unsatisfied with his creations.

== Career ==
=== 2000–2009: Grin and early freelance work ===
Wiklund joined Grin in 2000 and acted as a composer and sound designer on most of the company's projects, starting with its first game, Ballistics. He later changed his surname to Viklund as people abroad often mispronounced his name, as 'W' and 'V' have similar pronunciations in Swedish. Viklund was also involved in developing the PC version of Tom Clancy's Ghost Recon Advanced Warfighter (2006) and its 2007 sequel, which were published by Ubisoft. He subsequently led the development of Bionic Commando Rearmed, a remake of the 1988 NES version commissioned by Capcom; Viklund also composed the game's soundtrack, which was praised for its faithful reimagining of the original 8-bit arrangements. Elements of Viklund's Bionic Commando Rearmed soundtrack were also incorporated into Bionic Commando (2009), which was mainly scored by Jamie Christopherson, while Viklund served as the sound designer. Aside from Grin's projects, he also worked on Triotech's Wasteland Racers 2071 (2006).

Viklund began work on Bionic Commando Rearmed 2 as its creative director in 2009, before Grin went bankrupt four months into its development. Development was transferred to Fatshark, and Viklund was hired as a creative advisor and composer. He was also commissioned by Capcom for Final Fight: Double Impact (2010) and Street Fighter III: 3rd Strike Online Edition (2011), for which he composed the music.

=== 2009–2015: Overkill Software ===
Viklund, along with the Andersson brothers and other Grin employees, founded Overkill Software in 2009. At Overkill, he served as the creative director and sound designer for the company's first game, Payday: The Heist, and also composed its soundtrack, drawing inspiration from the 1995 crime film Heat. He also voiced Bain, the main narrator and contract broker in the game. Viklund would reprise his role as composer and the voice of Bain in Payday 2, released in 2013.

On August 18, 2015, Viklund left Overkill to focus on his personal and freelance music projects. However, he continued to voice Bain and produce music in Payday 2 as a freelancer.

=== 2016–present: 10 Chambers Collective ===
In 2016, Viklund co-founded a new company with Ulf Andersson, 10 Chambers Collective, while also continuing to work on his freelance projects. He also signed an exclusive songwriter agreement with BMG in the same year. Viklund composed the soundtrack to Robonauts in 2017, and worked as a game designer, narrative director, and composer for 10 Chambers' first project, GTFO.

== Musical style and influences ==
Viklund's compositions are primarily based on elements of electronic music genres such as techno, big beat, electro-funk, or dubstep, but some have been based on rock, industrial music and rap. In 2008, Viklund's music was labelled by Swedish magazine Nöjesguiden as "chip house" music, while Viklund considered his music to be from a variety of inspirations, ultimately becoming "8-bit-inspired dance music". Viklund has described the musical style of his tracks to be "a mix between the music I find suitable for the project in question, the music I enjoy, and the music I have the skills to produce." In Ballistics and Bandits: Phoenix Rising, he cited the Quake III soundtrack, Fatboy Slim, and The Chemical Brothers as inspirations for the rock, techno, big beat, and industrial sound. When it came to the soundtrack of Bionic Commando Rearmed, Viklund was influenced by groups such as The Crystal Method and Justice.

The soundtrack of Payday 2 featured a wide variety of music, especially when it came to the music for the game's downloadable content. The trailer for "The Big Bank" DLC featured an opera piece composed by Viklund, who wrote the lyrics in Swedish and had them translated to Italian to be performed by opera singers.

=== Composition ===
The music for his first two projects, Ballistics and Bandits: Phoenix Rising, were made with FastTracker 2, while the tracks for Bionic Commando series and Payday: The Heist, were made with Jeskola Buzz. In 2013, for Payday 2, he moved on to using Ableton Live, supplemented with a Native Instruments Komplete keyboard and the reFX Nexus 2 Synthesizer plug-in.

== Works ==
=== Ludography ===
Year	Title	Developer	Role	Notes
2001	Ballistics	Grin	composer, sound designer	
2002	Bandits: Phoenix Rising	Grin	composer, sound designer	
2006	Wasteland Racers 2071	Triotech	composer, sound designer	
2006	Tom Clancy's Ghost Recon: Advanced Warfighter	Grin	sound designer	
2007	Tom Clancy's Ghost Recon: Advanced Warfighter 2	Grin	sound designer	
2008	Bionic Commando Rearmed	Grin	composer, creative director	
2009	Bionic Commando	Grin	senior sound designer, music consultant	
2009	Wanted: Weapons of Fate	Grin	sound designer	
2009	Terminator Salvation	Grin	sound designer	
2010	Final Fight: Double Impact	Capcom	composer	
2011	Bionic Commando Rearmed 2	Fatshark	composer, writer, creative consultant	
2011	Street Fighter III: 3rd Strike Online Edition	Capcom	composer	
2011	Payday: The Heist	Overkill Software	composer, sound designer, creative director, voiceover	voice of Bain
2013	Brothers: A Tale of Two Sons	Starbreeze Studios	music consultant	
2013	Payday 2	Overkill Software	composer, chief engineer, sound designer, voiceover	voice of Bain and Cloakers
2014	Gear Up	Doctor Entertainment	composer	trailer music
2016	Dead by Daylight	Behaviour Interactive	composer	trailer music
2016	Pan-Pan	Spelkraft	composer, sound designer	
2017	Robonauts	Qubic Games	composer	
2019	GTFO	10 Chambers Collective	composer, game designer, narrative director	

=== Discography ===
Viklund has released several of his compositions as albums and singles, both independently and on behalf of Overkill Software:

==== Albums ====
Year	Title	Notes
2012	Payday - The Game Soundtrack	
2013	PAYDAY 2 Official Soundtrack	Features tracks by Gustaf Grefberg
2013	A Merry Payday Christmas	Credited to Hoxton, voiced by Pete Gold
2015	Overkill B-Sides	
2016	O.R.B.O.T	
2018	Free Music	
2018	RADIX - Music From and Inspired by Robonauts	
2018	STHLM Hunters OST	
2019	Badlands	

==== Singles ====
Year	Title	Notes
2014	"Kid Icarus Remix feat. Brand0"	
2014	"Drifting"	Credited as "Pat Briscoe"; from the Payday 2 trailer "The Dentist"
2014	"Criminal's Ambition"	Featuring KwoteONE
2014	"Ode All'Avidità"	
2015	"Breath of Death"	From the Payday 2 Jacket trailer
2015	"The Flames of Love"	Written by Viklund, credited to "Smokey Bennett & The Hoops"
2015	"The Club"	Reinterpretation of "The Mark" from the Payday 2 Soundtrack
2016	"Chains is in a Pickle"	
2019	"Steal From The Rich, Give To Myself"	
