= Grin (company) =

Swedish video game developer

Grin AB
- Type: Privately held company
- Industry: Video games
- Founded: 1997
- Founder: Bo and Ulf Andersson
- Defunct: August 12, 2009
- Successor: Overkill Software
- Headquarters: Stockholm, Sweden
- Key people: Bo Andersson; Ulf Andersson
- Products: Ghost Recon Advanced Warfighter; Ghost Recon Advanced Warfighter 2 Bionic Commando; Bionic Commando Rearmed

Grin AB was a Swedish video game developer based in Stockholm. Founded by Bo and Ulf Andersson in 1997, Grin worked on numerous titles for the PC, consoles and arcade. The company filed for bankruptcy and became defunct in August 2009 and its founders went on to create Overkill Software.

== History ==
Grin was founded by brothers Bo and Ulf Andersson in 1997. After Grin's first release Ballistics (PC, arcade) in 2001, Grin released the critically acclaimed Bandits: Phoenix Rising (PC) and several arcade machines as well as military and civilian simulators. Grin went on to develop two games for Ubisoft, Tom Clancy's Ghost Recon Advanced Warfighter (PC) and Tom Clancy's Ghost Recon Advanced Warfighter 2 (PC). Bionic Commando Rearmed (Xbox Live, PlayStation Network, PC), Bionic Commando (Xbox 360, PlayStation 3, PC), Wanted: Weapons of Fate (Xbox 360, PlayStation 3, PC) and Terminator Salvation were the last titles, released in 2008–2009. In 2007, Grin expanded into offices on the Barcelona, Spain beach front, in the Torre Mapfre skyscraper, followed by another studio in the center of Gothenburg, Sweden, along with the Grin Jakarta QA studio, located in the center of Jakarta, Indonesia. 250 people in total were developing games for the Xbox 360, PlayStation 3 and PC.

Grin began preproduction work on a Final Fantasy spin-off game, Fortress, in the second half of 2008 when Square Enix outsourced it to the Swedish developer. The development team, based in Stockholm, began creating concept art, 3D models and a game engine, thinking of Fortress as a "game with an epic scale both in story and production values". In addition to original characters and locations, concept art for the game depicted Ashe and a Judge character from Final Fantasy XII, and chocobos and other recurring creatures of the series. The score was also being produced. However, after six months of development, Square Enix reclaimed the project without paying Grin, due to concerns over the quality of the work. Grin co-founders Ulf and Bo Andersson stated that "Square Enix had already made up its mind that Fortress wasn't a project it wanted anymore". Square Enix's withdrawal left the Swedish developer in financial difficulty and with no other ongoing game project.

In 2009, Grin closed its offices in Barcelona and Gothenburg, citing financial difficulties. On 12 August 2009, Grin filed for bankruptcy. Later the same day, the official Grin site published the news that the company was closing down. Grin noted that delayed payments from "too many publishers" caused "an unbearable cashflow situation" and mentioning in a farewell note their "unreleased masterpiece that [they] weren't allowed to finish".

Former members of Grin formed a new development studio, Might and Delight, which focuses on small, downloadable games. Together with the owners of Fatshark, the former lead engineers of Grin started middleware developer Bitsquid, which was later bought by Autodesk. Former quality assurance members formed a separate studio called Trinity QA Studio in June 2010. Bo and Ulf Andersson (along with their friend Simon Viklund) went on to form Overkill Software. Bertil Hörberg, who worked on both Bionic Commando and Bionic Commando Rearmed, went on to form Hörberg Productions, a one-man studio responsible for the well-received Gunman Clive (Nintendo 3DS, iOS, Android, Steam) and its sequel Gunman Clive 2 (3DS, Steam). The games were bundled together as Gunman Clive HD Collection for Wii U and Nintendo Switch.

== Technology ==
The Diesel engine was originally developed for Grin's game Ballistics and has been used, albeit with modifications, in a number of other games since then. The first installment of the engine was developed in close collaboration with Nvidia, aimed to showcase the capabilities of their latest graphics chip at the time, the GeForce 3. The engine is currently in use by Overkill Software, former owners of Grin. Overkill's game Payday: The Heist uses a modified version of this engine. Payday 2 and Raid: World War II run on the second-generation Diesel engine 2.0, with Payday 2 currently being migrated to Diesel 3.0 as of mid 2026.

== Games developed ==
Release date	Titles	Genre	Platform(s)
2001	Ballistics	Racing	Microsoft Windows, Arcade
2003	Bandits: Phoenix Rising	Vehicular combat	Microsoft Windows
2006	Tom Clancy's Ghost Recon Advanced Warfighter	Tactical shooter	Microsoft Windows
2007	Tom Clancy's Ghost Recon Advanced Warfighter 2	Tactical shooter	Microsoft Windows
2008	Bionic Commando Rearmed	Platformer	Microsoft Windows, PlayStation Network, Xbox Live Arcade
2009	Wanted: Weapons of Fate	Third-person shooter	Microsoft Windows, PlayStation 3, Xbox 360
2009	Bionic Commando	Action, platformer	Microsoft Windows, PlayStation 3, Xbox 360
2009	Terminator Salvation	Third-person shooter, action	Microsoft Windows, PlayStation 3, Xbox 360
Cancelled	Fortress (codename)	Action-adventure	PlayStation 3, Xbox 360
Cancelled	Scream Prototype (2011)	Horror	Microsoft Windows, Unknown
Cancelled	Unnamed Strider reboot	Action	Unknown
Cancelled	Unnamed Streets of Rage remake	Beat 'em up	Unknown
Cancelled	Cult (codename)	Third-person shooter, action	Microsoft Windows, PlayStation 3, Xbox 360
Cancelled	Vultures	Hack and slash	Xbox
