= Ballistics (video game) =

2001 video game

- Cover art
- Developer: Grin
- Publishers: Xicat Interactive (Windows); Triotech (Arcade); Linux Game Publishing (Linux)
- Producer: Ulf Andersson
- Programmer: Mattias Flodin
- Artist: Anders Bodbacka
- Composer: Simon Viklund
- Engine: Diesel
- Platforms: Arcade, Linux, Microsoft Windows
- Release: EU: October 19, 2001; NA: November 6, 2001; NA: January 2002 (Arcade); NA: June 7, 2007 (Linux)
- Genre: Racing
- Modes: Single-player, multiplayer

Ballistics is a 2001 racing video game developed by Grin and published by Xicat Interactive. Grin developed an arcade version of the game, released in 2002 featuring a unique reclined seating position cabinet by Triotech. Players race across seven different tracks in various leagues against other competitors on high-speed hoverbikes.

The game was Grin's first to be released, and featured the first version of their Diesel game engine. Grin worked closely with NVIDIA to incorporate then new technologies into the game, and was marketed as one of the flagship titles for the GeForce 3 series of graphics cards.

Critical reaction was average, with reviewers being impressed by the beauty of the graphics and the thrilling depiction of speed. They were however, slightly disappointed with the shallow nature of the gameplay. A newer version of the arcade game was released in 2003, incorporating motion simulator technology into the arcade cabinet.

== Gameplay ==
Set in 2090, the game is centred on a fictional extreme racing sport known as Ballistics, a descendant of Formula One. The player takes the role of a Ballistic's pilot, racing hoverbikes called speeders through the inside of tubes which form the courses. The speeders are magnetically attached to the race surface, allowing the player 360 degrees of movement along the left/right axis. The player can detach the speeder from the track and navigate down the center in order to avoid track obstacles and to acquire the power-ups exclusively located there. Players must try to follow the outside of each curve, as hitting the inside of a curve at speed could lead to an involuntary detachment, leading to a loss of control and seconds dropped in securing reattachment.

Heat levels on the speeder must be monitored, as although there are no set top speeds for the vehicles, they can explode if allowed to overheat. Heat builds up from acceleration and from collisions. To counteract this, the player may activate the onboard cooler, however, this will slow the vehicle down. Designated cooling strips along the track and the Ice power-up can cool the vehicle without a speed penalty, allowing the player to continue accelerating.

Speeders have a boost meter, showing how much fuel is available for the onboard speed boost. Although the boost provides greater speeds and acceleration than the standard throttle, it also increases the speeder's heat levels. Designated booster load zones along the track replenish the meter, and a super boost power-up is available which doubles the potency of the boost.

Players are rewarded with cash for attaining high speeds, placing highly in races and obtaining the Flip-Score power-up. Cash can be used in between races to upgrade their speeder by purchasing new parts. Parts are split into four categories - chassis, cooler, engine and front shield, with each affecting the speeder in different ways. Some tracks may favour a particular set-up over others.

There are seven tracks included in the game, with locations inspired from different parts of the globe, from Belize to Tokyo. Progression through the game is achieved by competing in and winning races against computer-controlled racers spread over different tracks and in different leagues. Players begin in the Rookie league, across three of the tracks, where the chances of detachment from the race surface are decreased and rates of acceleration reduced. Success in the Rookie league unlocks the less forgiving Pro league with more tracks on which to compete. Further success unlocks the most difficult league, the Ballistics league, competition in this league occurs across every track and to complete this, the player must place first in every race.

Success in the game relies on track memorisation, fast reflexes, careful balancing of heat and boost levels, and selecting the right set-up for each track. The game is marked for its pure focus on speed, with speeds breaking mach 3 depending on the players skill. At these speeds the graphics and audio blur and distort, and have been compared with the psychedelic vortex sequence of 2001: A Space Odyssey. Ballistics supports multiplayer gameplay for up to eight players across a LAN or internet.

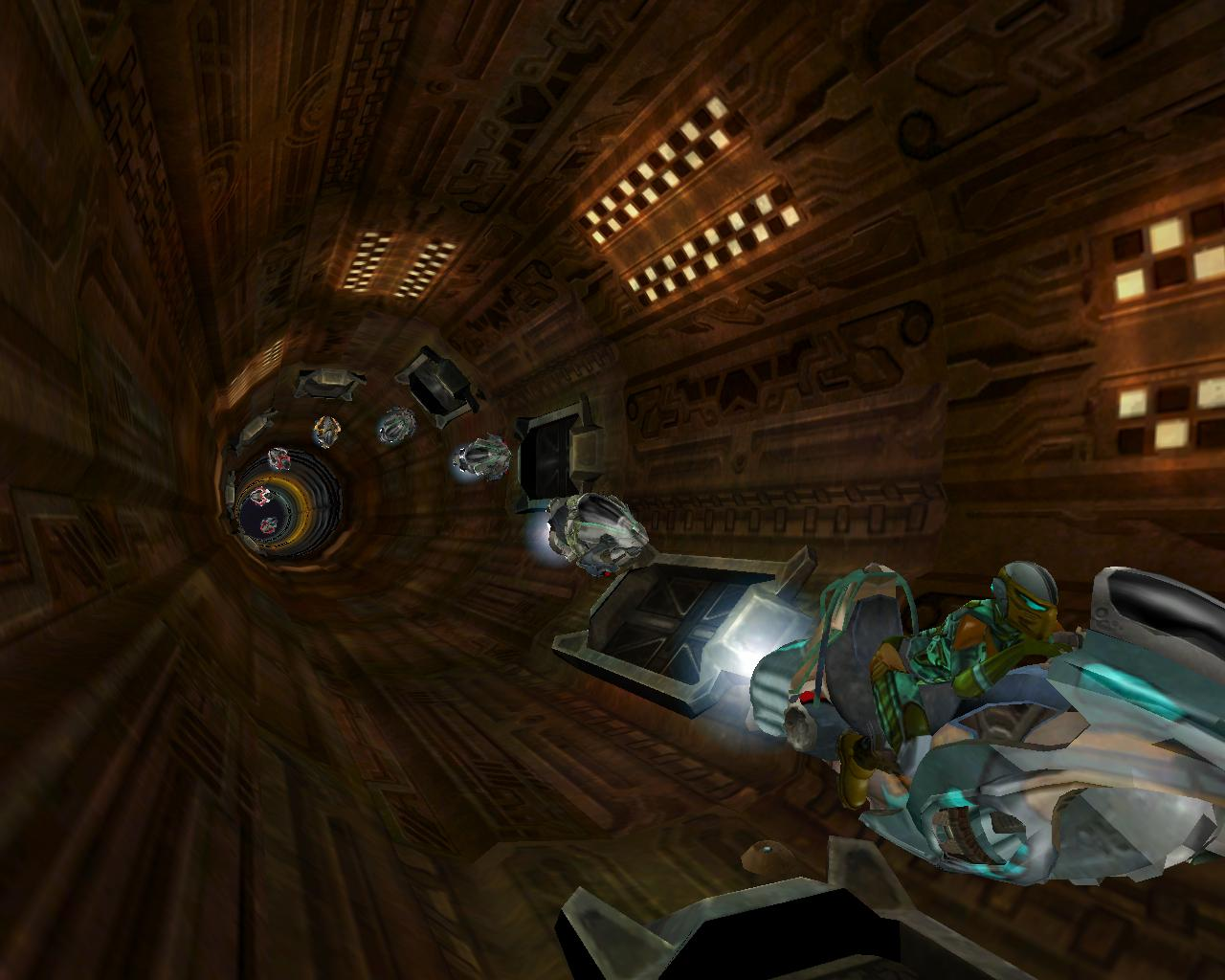
Speeders line up on the starting grid.

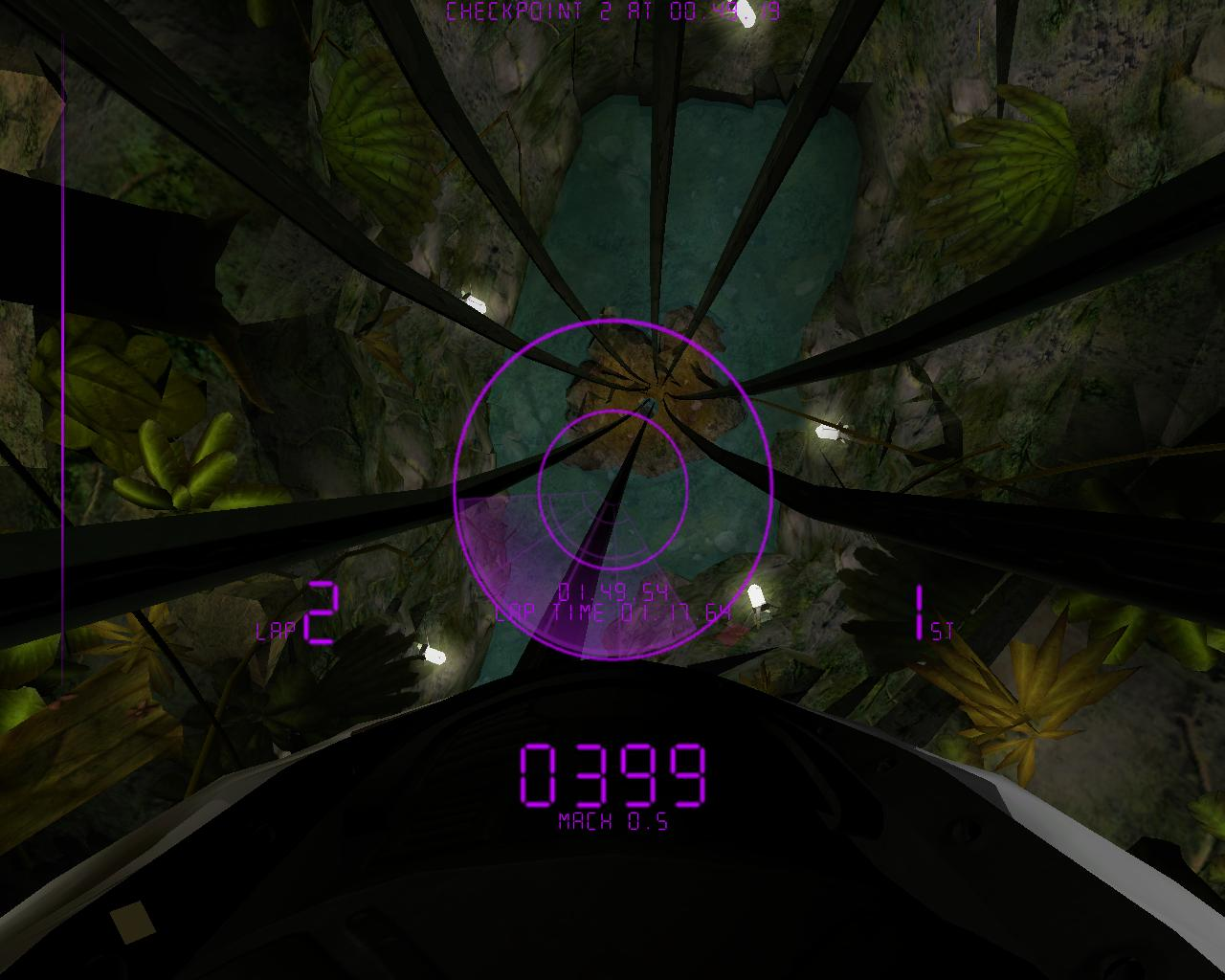
The player races through the rainforests of Belize.

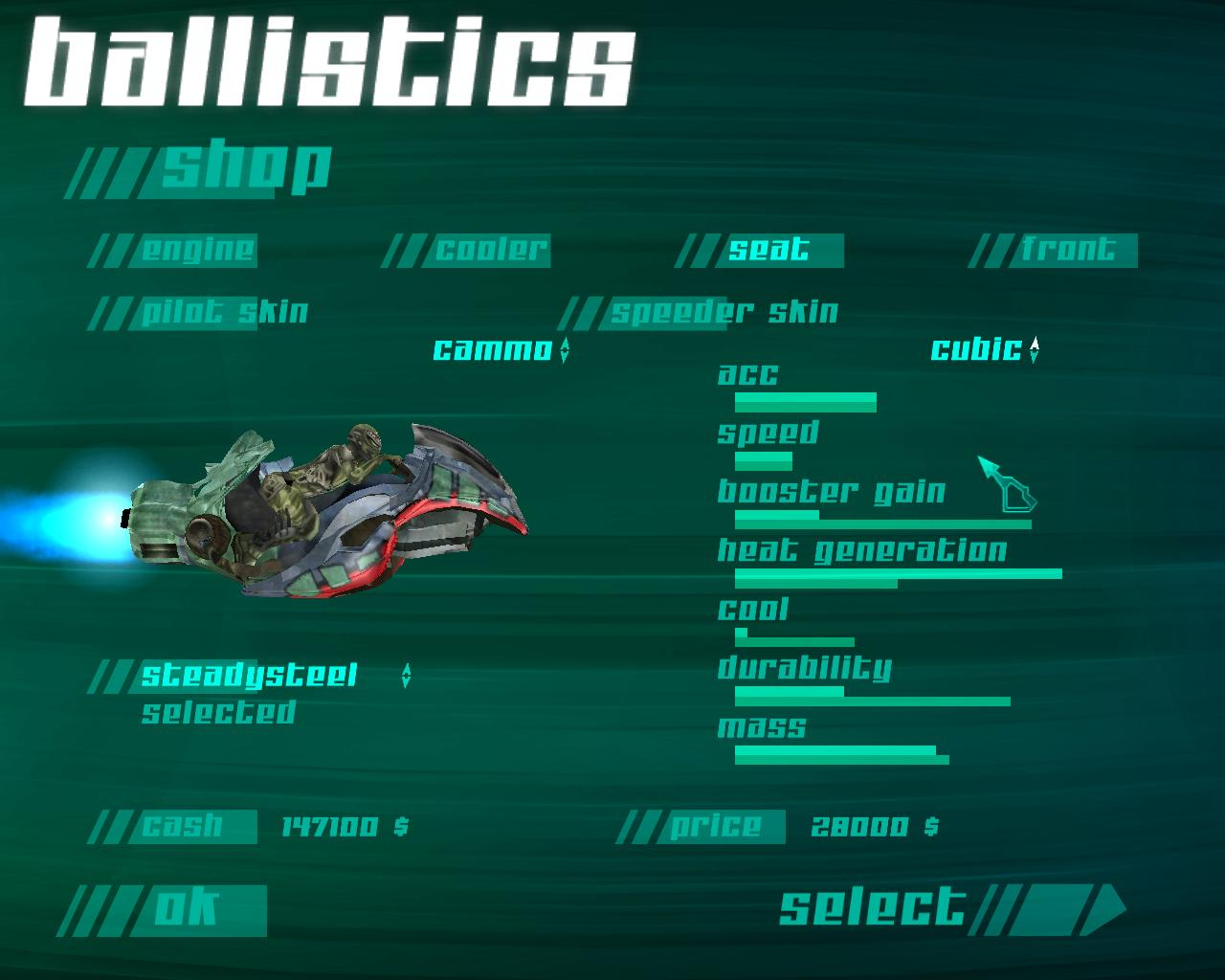
Players can upgrade their speeder during the shop screen in between races.

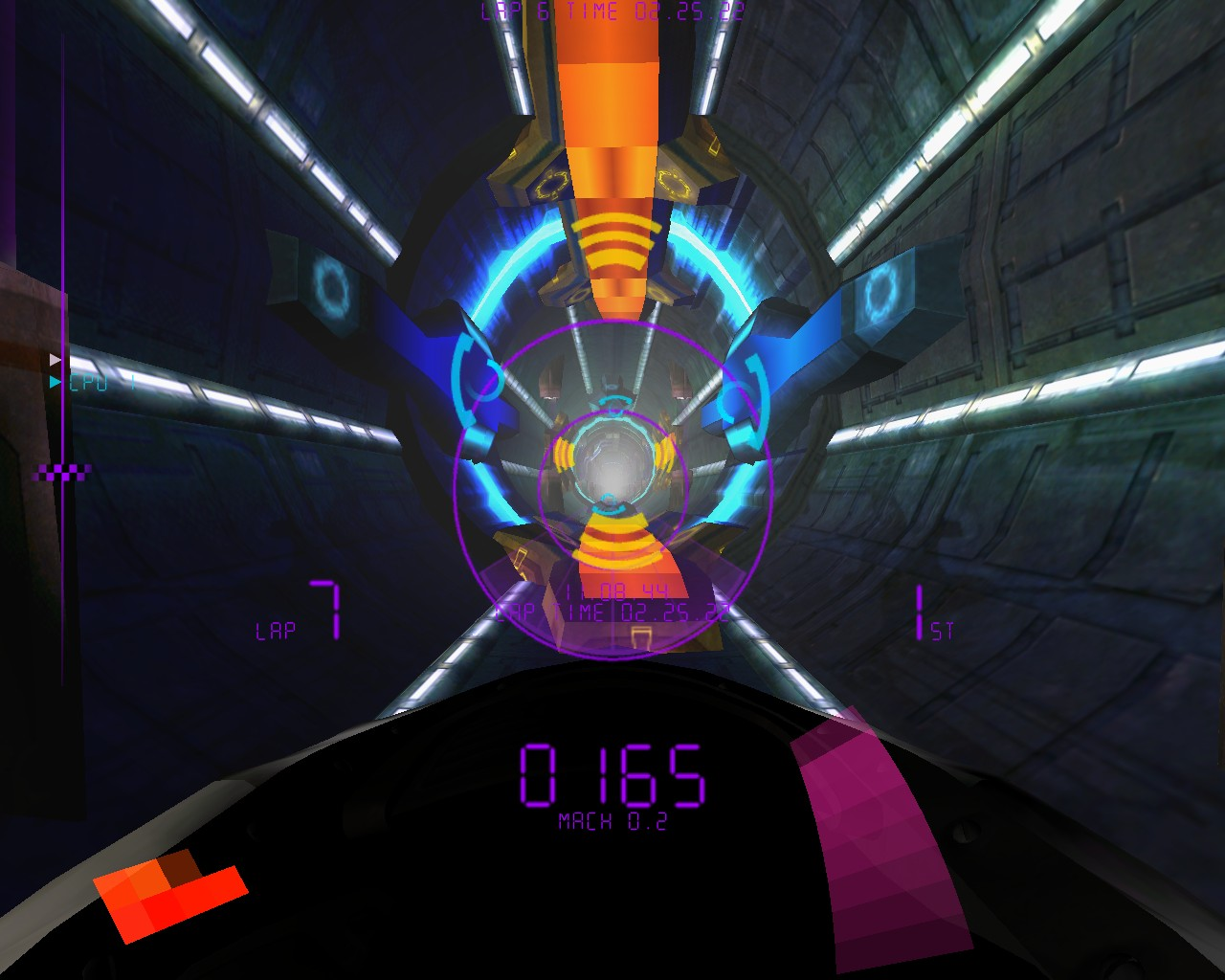
Track features as well as HUD elements can be seen in this screenshot.

== Development ==
Ballistics was the first game developed at Grin. Careful planning and production methods enabled a very quick completion time of 6 months; the game was finished before even acquiring a distribution partner. Grin used TQM methods to ensure a high standard of work, and JIT techniques to ensure the timing of different production phases came together.

The prime inspiration for the game was Formula One, and Grin tried to recreate the feeling of speed captured by the in-car cameras. In order to achieve a good on screen reference for the speeds attained, the track was redesigned into a tunnel, allowing the entire screen to act as a reference. Coupling this with scenes of the outdoors enabled Grin to create "a total speed simulation". The settings were inspired by various sources, the city tracks drew inspiration from the films Blade Runner and The Fifth Element, other tracks took their inspiration from nature, such as the Amazon rainforest and snow scenes of Siberia. Ballistics took cues from other futuristic racing games, such as WipEout and Rollcage, emulating the fun and the speed whilst taking it even further with high end graphics.

The graphics engine used to power the game was christened the Diesel Engine. Grin developed this engine for flexibility and scalability, allowing the engine to be easily upgraded with new features. Based on DirectX, this meant the engine could be used across Windows and Xbox platforms. Grin worked closely with NVIDIA to incorporate then new technologies such as pixel and vertex shaders to render complex scenes. Ballistics was marketed by NVIDIA as a flagship title for their new series of GeForce 3 graphics cards. The game came bundled with various versions of the GeForce 3, with distribution of the bundled game handled by Interplay OEM. Later versions of the Diesel Engine would be used in Grin games such as the Windows version of Tom Clancy's Ghost Recon Advanced Warfighter.

== Arcade version ==
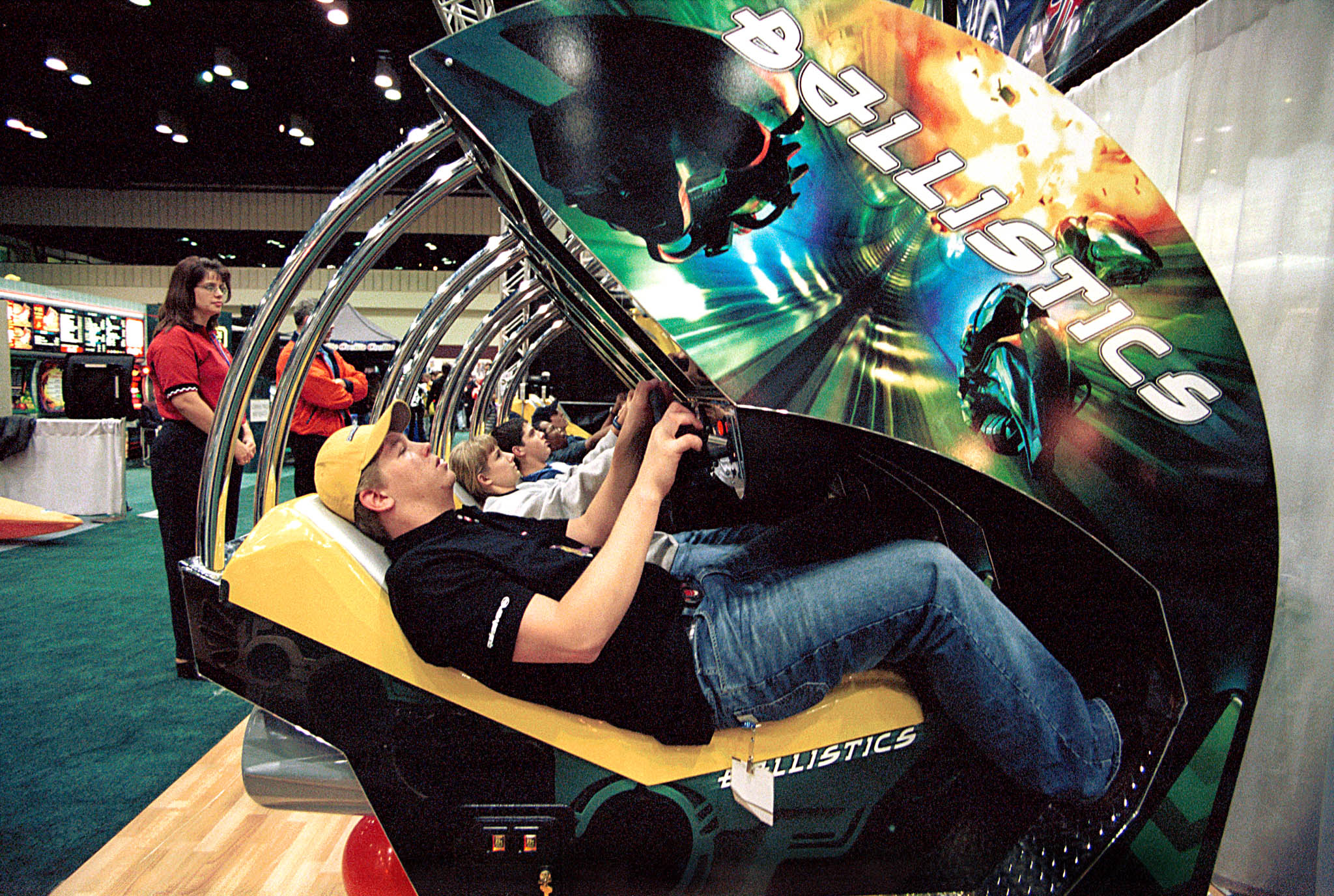
Ballistics Arcade on demonstration at the November 2002 IAAPA Convention. The game features 8 player multiplayer across networked cabinets.

Grin announced in May 2001 that it was working on an arcade version of Ballistics for distribution by Triotech. The game's gameplay had to be reworked to suit an arcade environment, and support was added for multiplayer games with up to eight linked cabinets. Triotech designed a unique reclined seating cabinet for the game, the aim of the design was to offer the player a more comfortable and immersive experience. The inspiration for the design came to Triotech co-founder, Ernest Yale; who whilst putting his feet up on the desk, realised how comfortable the playing position was. Ballistics was released for arcades in January 2002.

The game would be updated twice for the arcade. Ballistics 2003, launched in March 2003, incorporated Triotech's MadWave Motion motion simulator technology into the cabinet. Providing force feedback through the seat, this allows the player to experience up to 2g of acceleration whilst playing the game, with actuators in the seat providing 100 movements per second. A further version of the cabinet, Super Ballistics, was launched in September 2003. Chris Morris listed Ballistics 2003 as one of the top "Video game gifts for the obscenely rich" in his Holiday 2004 column at CNN Money.

== Reception ==
Reception

Aggregate score
Aggregator	Score
Metacritic	71/100

Review scores
Publication	Score
Computer Gaming World	3/5
Eurogamer	8/10
GameSpot	6.3/10
GameSpy	78%
GameZone	7/10
IGN	7.2/10
PC Gamer (US)	65%
PC Zone	82%

The game received "mixed or average" reviews according to the review aggregation website Metacritic. Reviews generally praised the high graphical standard in the game, PC Zone described the visuals as superb and praised the use of "transparent surfaces and open frameworks to alleviate the potential monotony of racing through a drainpipe." IGN echoed this, stating that at those moments where "a solid tunnel breaks into a transparent one", "the true meticulous nature of the courses can be realized". GameSpot praised the graphical effects, describing them as "a psychedelic display of cosmic lighting and motion-blur wizardry".

Reviews were agreed on Ballistics' successful implementation of "a total speed simulation"; PC Zone stating that "Ballistics is, in fact, the fastest racing game ever", and Eurogamer commenting that this was a game that made "Wipeout look like Driving Miss Daisy". Although IGN felt that at times the "ridiculous speed actually often works to debilitate [the gameplay]".

The gameplay was less well received, and reviewers commented on the lack of depth to the gameplay and that the inclusion of only seven tracks meant the game lacked variety. PC Gamer (US Edition) noted that whilst "the game delivers an intense, thrilling experience", this only lasted "20 minutes or so". GameSpot shared similar sentiments, stating that "Ballistics loses much of its fascination within the first few hours of playtime" and that it would only take four or five practice sessions per track to master the game.

Still, some critics found the game very enjoyable and exciting. Eurogamer closed their review stating that "when you get 'in the zone'", "the sheer adrenaline rush is unbeatable". PC Zone finished by stating that "Ballistics really will leave your adrenal gland as dry as a stiffened sponge".
