= Fortress (cancelled video game) =

Cancelled video game

- Concept art by Tony Holmsten, one of the artists for the game.
- Developer: Grin
- Publisher: Square Enix
- Director: Ulf Andersson
- Designer: Erik Lindqvist
- Artists: Ulf Andersson; Anders De Geer; Björn Albihn
- Writer: Ulf Andersson
- Composer: Erik Thunberg
- Series: Final Fantasy
- Platforms: Microsoft Windows, PlayStation 3, Xbox 360
- Release: Cancelled
- Genre: Action role-playing game

Fortress is the code name of a cancelled action role-playing video game that was in development by Swedish game developer Grin. Director Ulf Andersson devised the concept for Fortress before preproduction began in the second half of 2008. During development, Square Enix approached the developer and proposed making the game a spin-off of Final Fantasy XII. Grin reconceived the game in the recurring Final Fantasy world of Ivalice, and included elements of XII, such as stylistic motifs and character designs; additional elements included chocobos and other recurring creatures from the Final Fantasy series. It was to be released for Microsoft Windows, PlayStation 3, and Xbox 360.

During development, Square Enix did not pay Grin over several months and disapproved of the game's Nordic art style. Grin worked to bring the game's art style closer to the Final Fantasy series, but after six months of development was told that no funding would ever come from Square Enix, and the developer filed for bankruptcy several days later. Word of the project leaked out through art portfolios of those who worked on the project and even a tech demo surfaced.

In 2011, Fortress was thought to have been in development by an undisclosed studio, but this was also suspended, and the game was not released in any form.

== Premise ==
According to scenario writer Ulf Andersson, the story was set several years after the events of Final Fantasy XII: Revenant Wings. The plot revolved a magical fortress designed to defend Ivalice from a being known as the Sea King Loemund, who rose every 10,000 years to attempt to conquer the land. During his last attempt, he was slain and his crown was lost in the fortress. Though the myth is mostly disregarded, the story is believed by Basch fon Ronsenburg, now serving the current Archadian Emperor Larsa Solidor under the name of "Judge Gabranth". Marching to the fortress' location, he and his forces would have needed to fend off the forces of Loemund, who seeks vengeance against his killer's descendant Queen Ashelia B'nargin Dalmasca. A central character plot was to be a romantic connection between Basch and Ashe that would fade as Larsa and Ashe grew closer and Basch became entrenched in his fight against Loemund. Other characters involved included the sky pirate Balthier, and earlier main protagonists Vaan and Penelo. A new character, a demigod named Laegd, would join Basch after being defeated in single combat. The main aim of the story was to bring the entire cast of Final Fantasy XII back together for a final fight to save Ivalice.

== Development ==
Gameplay combat test of two characters from the leaked tech demo.

Fortress started out as an original fantasy game concept designed by Ulf Andersson, Grin's co-founder. Preproduction began in the second half of 2008. Lead character artist Björn Albihn described Fortress as "a game with an epic scale both in story and production values". The project was developed on a game engine compatible with Microsoft Windows, PlayStation 3, and Xbox 360. The development team, led by Andersson as a creative director, produced concept art and 3D assets under art director Anders De Geer and Albihn. The game design was led by technical artist Erik Lindqvist. The art style of the game was supposed to be realistic and similar to The Elder Scrolls V: Skyrim according to Guillaumue Mraz, a level designer at Grin.

The game was pitched to various publishers, and the Japanese gaming company Square Enix took an interest in the project. Square Enix president Yoichi Wada visited Grin several times, and liked the action role-playing game concept and its Nordic visual style. After getting the chance to see a boss fight from Bionic Commando, which at the time was being developed by Grin for the Japanese company Capcom, Wada said he had seen enough, and decided that Square Enix would publish Fortress as a Final Fantasy spin-off.

Once it became a Final Fantasy title, the Grin founders wanted to come in and revolutionize Final Fantasy in new ways with their project. Fortress was to be set in the fictional world of Ivalice, specifically the version seen in Final Fantasy XII, only set some time in the future. In addition to many original characters and locations, concept art for the game included the character Ashe and a Judge from Final Fantasy XII, as well as chocobos and other recurring creatures of the Final Fantasy series. A portfolio video created by lead technical artist Anders Bodbacka revealed that Larsa Solidor and Basch fon Ronsenburg from Final Fantasy XII were also to be featured. The setting was to be different from a normal Final Fantasy game, with familiar characters exploring a "Nordic" version of Final Fantasy, and "primarily set in a massive fortress" according to Linda Dahlberg, a Grin associate producer. Other landscapes such as plains, forests, deserts and snowfields were also designed.

Invaders from the sea were to be the main enemies of the game. They were visually based on the Vikings and wielded armor and weapons decorated with sea and sea monster imagery. Planned boss battles included fighting a gargantuan version of the Final Fantasy monster Malboro, where the player would use the seaweed on its back to climb on top of it and drop bombs on the creature's weak spots. According to a design document, the game was divided into at least seven chapters, starting at the gate of the Fortress and leading up to the top of the stronghold. Grin's music director Erik Thunberg was responsible for the game's score, including a track that features a rearrangement of the "Prelude" theme from the Final Fantasy series.

== Cancellation ==
Square Enix was supposed to pay Grin US$16.5 million for the production of Fortress in successive waves in accordance with the project's milestones. No payments were made during the first two months of development, but Grin's co-founder Bo Andersson was initially not worried as he considered delayed payments common and had faith in the project. However, several more months went by without payments, costing the studio 12 million kr a month. Grin closed all of their offices except for the main one in Stockholm, but still no money came. In 2009, Grin released Terminator Salvation, Wanted: Weapons of Fate, and Bionic Commando to negative reviews and poor sales, which caused further financial woes and seemed to make Square Enix nervous. The publisher wanted updates and asked that all of the game's assets, including the code, the music files, and even the game's developer language be faxed to them. This move was described as impossible and "almost a criminal behavior" by Andersson.

Square Enix had changed its mind, and no longer liked the Nordic style of this spin-off game, so a last-minute style change was attempted. The game had been such a well-guarded secret, and had been through so many changes, that most employees did not know they had been working on a Final Fantasy game until very late in development. Grin attempted to change the art style to fit more with traditional Final Fantasy games, but still did not receive any positive feedback. In response, Grin sent Square Enix an image of one of the latter's own games, Final Fantasy XII, and were told that it does not look like a game in Final Fantasy's style. Following that exchange, Grin came to the conclusion that there was no longer any way to satisfy the publisher.

In early August 2009, a call was received from Square Enix telling them that no payments were coming. Grin's founders considered suing, but had run out of money, leading them to stop production after six months of work. Furthermore, Grin ceased production on all of their other projects and declared bankruptcy due to Sweden's severe laws against operating businesses under a debt load. Magnus Ihrefors, one of the 3D artists who worked on the project, stated that he had only found out about the game's cancellation in August, but it was like a "punch in the belly" for their last chance to get on track again. The developer closed its offices on August 12, stating that delayed payments from "too many publishers" caused "an unbearable cashflow situation" and referred to Fortress in a farewell note as an "unreleased masterpiece that [they] weren't allowed to finish". According to the bankruptcy papers, Square Enix felt that the development goals for Fortress "had not been met in a satisfactory way", whereas Andersson claimed the contrary, arguing that the milestones initially set up with a producer from Square Enix had been met. Mraz stated that Grin seemed to have ignored Square Enix's requests for changes, and the Final Fantasy franchise was too important to overlook this behavior. The Anderssons later called the game's cancellation a "betrayal", and said they have never received any payment for the initial work done on the game.

== Aftermath ==
After Grin's closure, the former existence of Fortress spread as mentions and concept art of the project appeared on former employees' resumes and portfolios. In January 2010, footage from an alleged tech demo of Fortress was leaked onto the Internet. The video description stated the game's events are "set some time after Final Fantasy XII: Revenant Wings" and mentioned Square Enix's subsidiary Eidos Montreal as a possible new home for the project. Replying to a fan question in May, David Hoffman, director of business development at the North American branch of Square Enix, mentioned Fortress without confirming its existence, also saying that he had no involvement in the rumored project. The Fortress project, still supported by Square Enix, was for a time being developed by a different, undisclosed studio, but this ended as well. At an interview at the 2011 Electronic Entertainment Expo, Motomu Toriyama of Square Enix said that Fortress was suspended, saying that the game "won't be released". In 2012, music director Erik Thunberg posted a music track intended for the game.
