= GTFO (video game) =

2021 first-person shooter game

- Key art
- Developer: 10 Chambers
- Publisher: 10 Chambers
- Director: Ulf Andersson (Note: The surname of this developer can be found in the game's credits sequence.)
- Designer: Hjalmar Vikström
- Programmer: George
- Artists: Anders Bodbacka; David Izzo; Anders Svärd
- Writer: Simon Viklund
- Composer: Simon Viklund
- Engine: Unity
- Platform: Windows
- Release: December 10, 2021
- Genre: First-person shooter
- Mode: Multiplayer

GTFO is a 2021 cooperative first-person shooter game developed and published by 10 Chambers. GTFO released in early access for Windows on December 9, 2019. The game was officially released two years later, on December 10, 2021, during The Game Awards 2021. In the game, the players control prisoners sent into a facility overrun by monsters and use guns, tools, and melee weapons to dispatch the monsters and complete objectives.

== Gameplay ==
There are eight "rundowns", each of which consists of multiple expeditions. In each expedition, the players control up to four prisoners who are placed in a run-down underground facility called "The Complex", and must complete the objectives which the "Warden", an entity with unknown motivations, has ordered them to do.

Two players are crouched down, looking at three sleepers. One is holding a bat and the other a personal defense weapon.

The Complex is overrun with humanoid monsters referred to as "sleepers", because they start off asleep. While asleep, the sleepers occasionally glow, causing them to detect player movement. They will also wake up if the players fire their guns near the sleepers, otherwise make noise, shine their flashlights on them, or hit them without killing them. They can be silently killed with a physical attack using a spear, sledgehammer, knife, or bat. If a sleeper detects a player, other nearby sleepers will wake up and attack the players.

The Complex consists of zones: groups of rooms separated by security doors. To open a security door, the players must be scanned by the door. The scan consists of an orange circle that appears below the door that all the players must stand in for some time, followed by the circle splitting into multiple smaller ones that must be stood in by individual players. Some doors have alarms which blare during a scan, causing sleepers to attack the players for the duration of the scan. The players have tools to prepare for these attacks, such as a "C-foam launcher" (which can reinforce doors and freeze enemies), sentry guns, and landmines.

In order to locate objectives and resources such as ammunition or medical supplies, the players often must use terminals to help find the desired object.

Players do not have to unlock weapons in order to use them (players must choose a 'main' weapon, a 'special' weapon, a melee weapon, and a tool to use for each expedition - all options are available from the start of the game), but players can collect 'boosters' (providing a single-use minor stat bonus for an attempt at an expedition), and players unlock new cosmetics whenever they complete an expedition for a first time. GTFO does not have any DLC, nor does it contain any microtransactions.

== Reception ==
=== Pre-release ===
GTFO received a warm reception at The Game Awards 2017. Other sites such as Rock Paper Shotgun and Gamereactor praised it for its horror, atmosphere and gameplay, both considering it among the best games of E3 2018, and considering the game horrifying from their gameplay previews.

The game was nominated in "The Best Game You Suck At" category at the 2020 and 2022 Steam Awards.

=== Post-release ===
Reception

Aggregate score
Aggregator	Score
Metacritic	78/100

Edit on Wikidata

Metacritic, which uses a weighted average, assigned the game a score of 78 out of 100, based on 15 critics, indicating "generally favorable" reviews.
