= Robonauts =

2017 video game

- Developer: QubicGames
- Publisher: QubicGames
- Composer: Simon Viklund
- Platforms: Nintendo Switch, PlayStation 4
- Release: Nintendo Switch: WW: 15 September 2017; PlayStation 4: WW: 19 September 2017
- Genre: Shooting game
- Modes: Single-player, multiplayer

Robonauts is a 2D arcade-like shooting game developed and published by QubicGames. It was released on Nintendo Switch on 15 September 2017 in North America and Europe and in Japan on 21 June 2018, and PlayStation 4 on 19 September 2017.

== Gameplay ==
The player/s takes on the role of a Robonaut, a "Robot Astronaut" who travels around planets shooting enemies. A gateway is present at every level, which if used will send players to the next level. However, the gateway is only accessible if all enemies are defeated. The player/s have the option to shoot with either primary or secondary weapons.

The game has multiple features which are unique to this game:

=== Gravity switching ===
The feature allows players to switch to other planets that are directly on top of, under. or next to players.

=== Tactical mode ===
This feature pauses the game and shows a map of the current level. It also highlights remaining enemies, which can be useful if one wants to open access to a gateway.

=== Game modes ===
Besides the single-player campaign, there is also a co-op feature and a Vs. Game mode.

All multiplayer modes are local-only and the game does not support online play.

== Soundtrack ==
The soundtrack was composed by Simon Viklund. It features arcade music with robotic beats.

== Reception ==
Reception

Review score
Publication	Score
GameRankings	69 %

The game was rated 69% at GameRankings. Nintendo Life gave the game 7/10, justifying their score by mentioning while the game could be quite repetitive, it was "well-crafted".

=== Sales ===
Robonauts sold more than 320,000 times on both platforms Nintendo Switch and PlayStation 4.
