= Wasteland Racers 2071 =

2006 video game

- Video arcade game flyer
- Developer: Triotech
- Publisher: Triotech
- Composer: Simon Viklund
- Platform: Arcade
- Release: NA: November 20, 2006
- Genre: Racing
- Modes: Single-player, multiplayer

Wasteland Racers 2071 is an arcade-style video game by Triotech that was released on November 20, 2006.

== Summary ==
The simulator takes place in the year 2071 with six race tracks (from Airport Mayhem to the Ruins of Lost Vegas) and five cars (from the Interceptor to the Crusher). If the player finishes first, they will receive a code that unlocks new cars and race courses. Wasteland Racers 2071 is one of the arcade games featured at Chuck E. Cheese's. None of the cars are linked to an actual manufacturer like Chevrolet or Ford; fantasy cars based on futuristic prototypes are used to navigate the post-apocalyptic racing venues. They have the ability to deliver up to 2Gs of acceleration. Because the title has the word "Wasteland" in it, it is assumed that the game is set in a dystopian 21st century.

There are two versions of this arcade game; the standard has a 27" monitor while the deluxe has the 52" monitor.
