= Bandits: Phoenix Rising =

2002 video game

- Developer: Grin
- Publishers: SWE: Pan Vision; NA: Tri Synergy; UK: Singularity Software
- Director: Bo Andersson
- Producer: Martin Waern
- Designer: Ulf Andersson
- Artist: Anders Bodbacka
- Composer: Simon Viklund
- Engine: Diesel Engine
- Platforms: Microsoft Windows; Linux
- Release: EU: October 4, 2002; NA: March 28, 2003; UK: May 16, 2003
- Genre: Vehicular combat
- Modes: Single-player, Multiplayer

Bandits: Phoenix Rising is a futuristic, racing action game, set in a post apocalyptic wasteland.

The player follows the pair Rewdalf and Fennec as they try to survive and make big bucks at the same time. The game was later also ported to Linux.

== Reception ==
Reception

Aggregate score
Aggregator	Score
Metacritic	73/100

Review scores
Publication	Score
Computer Games Magazine	3.5/5
Computer Gaming World	3.5/5
GameSpot	7/10
GameSpy	4/5
GameZone	8/10
IGN	7.2/10
PC Gamer (US)	74%
PC Zone	35%
X-Play	3/5

The game received "mixed or average" reviews according to the review aggregation website Metacritic.
