= Gunman Clive =

2012 video game

- Developer: Hörberg Productions
- Publisher: Hörberg Productions: JP: Flyhigh Works
- Director: Bertil Hörberg
- Series: Gunman Clive
- Platforms: Windows, Nintendo 3DS, Wii U, iOS, Android, Switch
- Release: Android: WW: 2 April 2012; iOS: WW: 20 April 2012; Windows: WW: 2 May 2012; Nintendo 3DS: EU: 20 December 2012; NA: 3 January 2013; JP: 22 May 2013; Wii U: NA: 3 September 2015; EU: 3 September 2015; JP: 28 October 2015; Switch: EU: 17 January 2019; NA: 17 January 2019; JP: 13 June 2019; PlayStation 4: WW: 22 May 2020
- Genre: Platform
- Mode: Single-player

Gunman Clive, released in Japan as Gunman Story (Japanese: ガンマンストーリー), is a platform game developed and published by Swedish development studio Hörberg Productions. It was first released for Android on 2 April 2012. The game follows Clive, a lone gunslinger in a futuristic Wild West, as he tries to save the mayor's daughter from a group of technologically well-armed bandits.

In 2015, a sequel, Gunman Clive 2, was released, in which Clive must save the world from the group of bandits from the previous game.

== Gameplay and plot ==
Gameplay screenshot

Gunman Clive is a side-scrolling platform game. The game is set in the year 18XX. The player controls the character Gunman Clive or Ms. Johnson as they fight enemies across 20 levels to rescue the mayor's daughter. The player has to traverse a 2D world filled with moving platforms, traps and enemies. The player can pick up power-ups such as a spread shot, explosive bullets, and a laser gun. Enemies vary from bandits who carry rifles and dynamite to animals such as pelicans and wolves. Bosses appear in every fifth level. All the player characters have life meters.

The 2D graphics are in the style of sketches, making the game resemble an interactive flip book. Gunman Clive's soundtrack pays tribute to the Western genre of video games. The differences between Gunman Clive and Ms. Johnson are that Ms. Johnson is slower, freezes in place while shooting, and has a skirt that can slow down descent. A third playable character, a duck, is unlocked after completion of the game. Gunman Clive has three difficulty settings, which differ in how much damage the player character takes with each hit and where the player character respawns after death.

== Development and release ==
Gunman Clive was developed by Hörberg Productions and designed by Bertil Hörberg. Some time after development of Gunman Clive, Hörberg, a gay man, regretted the lack of gay representation in the game. When developing the sequel, Gunman Clive 2, Hörberg made a point to include the character Chieftain Bob partly with the intention of him being included in the Wii U port of the game, where he is portrayed kissing Clive.

In Japan, the game was released by Flyhigh Works.

The game was approved through Steam Greenlight in November 2013. In October 26, 2015, Bertil Hörberg released a one level ROM of Gunman Clive for the Game Boy line and for the Super NES on May 30, 2016.

== Reception ==
Reception

Aggregate scores
Aggregator	Score
GameRankings	(3DS) 82.20% (iOS) 81.25%
Metacritic	(3DS) 82/100 (iOS) 81/100

Review scores
Publication	Score
Destructoid	(3DS) 8/10
IGN	(3DS) 8.7/10
Nintendo Life	(3DS) 8/10
Pocket Gamer	(iOS) 8/10
TouchArcade	(iOS) 4.5/5

Gunman Clive received generally positive reviews after its release from both mainstream and video game journalists. The gameplay, art and style were praised by Destructoid, which said that its major flaws are its short length, game freezes during the second boss fight, and sometimes inappropriate soundtrack. Destructoid also noted that the game takes many ideas from the Mega Man series. Destructoid described it as "a steal at $2" and said that "fans of 2D action platformers need to check it out. If Hörberg Productions is ever graced with the opportunity to develop a mainline Mega Man game, I'm confident that fans of the series would be happy with the results." IGN described it as "a brief experience, but still one well worth experiencing if you’re looking for a fine $2 platformer on your 3DS. The stellar game design is emboldened by the three different characters you can play as. From start to finish, Gunman Clive is a fantastic platformer, good enough that it is worth playing multiple times to play as every character."

=== Sales ===
By January 2015, more than 400,000 copies of the game had been sold, with over eighty percent of sales on the 3DS. The Gunman Clive HD Collection was sold 9,000 times until January 2016.

== Legacy ==
A sequel, Gunman Clive 2, was released for the Nintendo 3DS on 29 January 2015. The story now takes Clive around the world to chase after the leader of the bandits from the first game. In June 2015, Bertil Hörberg announced the two games would be released on the Wii U as Gunman Clive HD Collection. The collection was also released on the Nintendo Switch on January 17, 2019, and PlayStation 4 on May 22, 2020.

Clive, Ms. Johnson and the duck enemy appeared as three of the playable guest characters in the 2D action RPG game Drancia Saga for the Nintendo 3DS.

Clive appears as an assist character in the early access indie fighting game Fraymakers.
