= Gunman Clive 2 =

2015 video game

- Developer: Hörberg Productions
- Publisher: Hörberg Productions
- Platforms: Nintendo 3DS, Windows, Wii U, Switch
- Release: Nintendo 3DS; 29 January 2015; Windows; 3 September 2015; Wii U (HD Collection): NA: 3 September 2015; EU: 3 September 2015; JP: 28 October 2015; Nintendo Switch (HD Collection): EU: 17 January 2019; NA: 17 January 2019; PlayStation 4 (HD Collection): WW: 22 May 2020
- Genre: Platform
- Mode: Single-player

Gunman Clive 2 is a platform game developed and published by independent Swedish studio Hörberg Productions. It is the sequel to 2012's Gunman Clive.

== Gameplay ==
Gunman Clive 2 is a platform game. The game features a total of 25 stages and uses the same engine as Gunman Clive, but features oversaturated colors compared to the predecessor. The gameplay is largely similar to that of its predecessor and features three playable characters: Gunman Clive, Ms. Johnson, and Chieftain Bob. After finishing the game, a secret character, a duck, is unlocked.

== Development ==
Gunman Clive 2 was developed and published by Hörberg Productions. The game was released for Nintendo 3DS handheld console on 29 January 2015. It was released for Windows on 3 September 2015.

In June 2015, Bertil Hörberg announced the game and its predecessor would be released on the Wii U as Gunman Clive HD Collection. The collection was released on September 3, 2015 in North America and Europe, and October 28, 2015 in Japan. The collection was also released on the Nintendo Switch on January 17, 2019, and PlayStation 4 on May 22, 2020.

== Reception ==
Reception

Aggregate score
Aggregator	Score
Metacritic	80/100

Review scores
Publication	Score
Destructoid	8.5/10
Nintendo Life	9/10

Gunman Clive 2 holds a rating of 80/100 on review aggregate site Metacritic, indicating "generally favourable reviews".

=== Sales ===
There are no specific sales figures for Gunman Clive 2. However, the game's developer, Bertil Hörberg, commented on the sales on Twitter and said that they were "[...] a bit disappointing [...]" compared to its predecessor. The Gunman Clive HD Collection was sold 9,000 times until January 2016.
