= Tom Clancy's Ghost Recon Advanced Warfighter 2 =

2007 video game

Tom Clancy's Ghost Recon: Advanced Warfighter 2
- Developers: Ubisoft Paris; Red Storm Entertainment (Note: PSP port developed by High Voltage Software. Windows port developed by Grin.)
- Publisher: Ubisoft
- Designers: Yann Masson and Christophe Pic
- Programmer: Olivier Didelot
- Artist: Avlamy Ramassamy
- Writer: Benjamin Haddad
- Composer: Tom Salta
- Series: Tom Clancy's Ghost Recon
- Engine: Diesel (PC)
- Platforms: Xbox 360, Microsoft Windows, PlayStation 3, PlayStation Portable
- Release: Xbox 360: NA: March 8, 2007; AU: March 8, 2007; EU: March 9, 2007; Microsoft Windows: AU: June 29, 2007; EU: July 13, 2007; NA: July 17, 2007; PlayStation 3 & PlayStation Portable: NA: August 21, 2007; AU: August 23, 2007; EU: August 24, 2007
- Genre: Tactical shooter
- Modes: Single-player, multiplayer

Tom Clancy's Ghost Recon: Advanced Warfighter 2 is a 2007 tactical shooter video game developed by Ubisoft Paris and Red Storm Entertainment and published by Ubisoft. It was released for Xbox 360, Microsoft Windows, PlayStation 3 and PlayStation Portable. It is the sequel to Tom Clancy's Ghost Recon Advanced Warfighter. High Voltage Software developed the game's PlayStation Portable version, while Grin developed the Windows version.

The game takes place in 2014, immediately after the events of Tom Clancy's Ghost Recon Advanced Warfighter (GRAW), just south of the Mexico–United States border, and focuses on the conflict between a Mexican rebel group, Mexican loyalists, and the U.S. Army in the span of 72 hours. A wide array of location types are included, featuring mountains, small towns, urban environments, and a large hydro-electric dam.

== Gameplay ==
Much of the gameplay remains similar to its predecessor; the combat focuses on the player doing the bulk of the fighting, while relying on tactical combat instead of arcade-style shooting to overcome opponents. As with the previous game, weapons featured in the game are either based on actual models (such as the FN SCAR) or are hypothetical prototypes, with the player able to command friendly units assigned to help them, from their own squad, to drones, tanks and aircraft. Like its predecessor, two different versions exist; while both the Xbox 360 and Playstation 3 versions are essentially similar, the Microsoft Windows version features many gameplay differences to these versions. In addition, a new and improved gameplay element is introduced - Crosscom 2.0 - as well as new weapons (including sub-machine guns for secondary weapons), the ability to have a medic in the squad, and new friendly units to control, including a two-man squad of Loyalist troops, the MULE Drone, a Little Bird attack helicopter, and Far Support (Airstrikes for consoles, Mortar/Artillery Support for Microsoft Windows).

=== Crosscom 2.0 ===
Crosscom 2.0 is an improvement on the original system introduced from the previous game, giving players more direct involvement in a combat situation as well as more control over friendly units. The most significant improvement to this is an information interlink between all friendly units, which now allows players to get a full screen view of what any unit is seeing. Furthermore, players can use this perspective to plan out orders for units and even directly control the movement of some units as well, such as the MULE.

=== Xbox 360 and PlayStation 3 versions ===
Much of the gameplay is similar to that of the Xbox 360 version of GRAW, although some new features, like Eternal Eyes, have been added to improve gameplay, making the direction of friendly units more accurate and effective. The squad A.I. has also been improved, with squad members actively seeking cover and descriptively calling out targets.

=== Microsoft Windows version ===
Much of the gameplay plays out differently to that of the console iterations, and more similarly to the original Tom Clancy's Ghost Recon, but remains largely similar to the Microsoft Windows version of GRAW, in that players play in a first-person perspective, must micro-manage team mates with greater use of squad tactics, and have more situation awareness. Developed by Grin and built on their proprietary engine called "Diesel 2.0", only a few in-game assets such as voice-overs and Cross-Com and Narcom videos remain the same. While some of the missions featured are similar in objective structure to those of the console version, they play out in a completely different manner.

=== Multiplayer ===
Unlike the first GRAW, players in the online multiplayer mode can be "downed", or critically injured, instead of killed. This gives teammates the opportunity to heal a downed teammate and prevent the other team from getting the point, although downed players can be shot and killed by players from the opposing team before they are healed. Characters can now "slide" into a crouched position while running, just like in the first GRAW. The ability to use cover like in the singleplayer mode is absent in the multiplayer mode. The player can choose from four weapon classes: Rifleman, Grenadier, Automatic Rifleman, and Marksman, each with its own bonus; for example choosing the rifleman class makes the player more proficient with rifles, the automatic rifleman more proficient with machine guns, and so on. Another new feature added to multiplayer is full-screen cross-com; as in singleplayer mode, the player can hold down a button and bring up the fullscreen view. This can be used to view friendly players' views as well as the Drone, but cannot be used to give commands or manually fly the drone.

Games are created by Xbox Live and PlayStation Network users and can be up to 16 players. Split Screen is available on the console versions, which supports up to four players.

== Plot ==
Despite the defeat of Carlos Ontiveros and Aguila 7 following a deadly coup in Mexico City, destabilization in Mexico continues and spreads across Latin America, to the point that the Panama Canal is closed due to insurgency. Captain Scott Mitchell and his Ghost team are given orders to return to Mexico, where rebels led by Juan de la Barrera are believed to be planning an attack on the United States from Ciudad Juárez, Chihuahua, possibly with a dirty bomb. Due to the U.S. Congress refusing further military action and treaty boundaries between Mexico and the U.S., the Ghosts are deployed covertly and largely on their own, at least until U.S. military support can be authorized.

Mitchell's Ghost team deploys outside Ciudad Juárez to assist Mexican Army loyalists led by Colonel Jimenez in attacking rebel positions. During the fighting, General Joshua Keating and Lieutenant Barnes learn that de la Barrera has acquired three smuggled Ukrainian Red Star IV nuclear warheads, which he plans to mount to stolen Pakistani Kashmira-II to use against the U.S.. The joint Ghost–loyalist force continue to operate against the rebels, but after securing a heavily defended supermarket, a warhead detonates in the supermarket's basement, killing many of Jimenez's men and irradiating the area.

With the warheads now confirmed to be in Ciudad Juárez, the Ghosts and Jimenez's remaining forces rescue a Mexican journalist for information on de la Barrera and the other warheads, but their Sikorsky UH-60 Black Hawk is shot down by mercenaries and Mitchell's team is forced to leave Lieutenant Rosen behind. The team fights their way to another extraction helicopter, but Barnes reveals that the rebels managed to secure the crash site, retrieve the Black Hawk wreckage, and capture Rosen, which the U.S. government fears they will use to expose American involvement and twist it to garner support for the rebellion. Keating tasks Mitchell's team with raiding a hacienda, where they successfully destroy the wreckage and recover Rosen, leaving the rebels without evidence.

After Mitchell's team returns from the hacienda raid, U.S. President Ballantine and Mexican President Ruiz-Peña sign the North American Joint Security Agreement, authorizing a formal U.S. military intervention into Mexico. The Ghosts use the rescued journalist's information to track down a warhead and kill de la Barrera, but they are unable to recover the other warhead. Reports eventually arrive of an attack on a dam in El Paso, Texas, and Barnes realizes they are targeting a ballistic missile defense installation beneath the dam to disable American nuclear defenses and use the last warhead as leverage to force them out of Latin America. Ballantine, unwilling to bring war to the American border, tasks the Ghosts with finding the last warhead. With heavy support, the Ghosts head back into Mexico to stop the nuclear threat. Mitchell guides an EMP strike to neutralize the last warhead, which succeeds but seriously wounds him in the process. Mitchell is recovered by Rosen, while Keating and Ballantine congratulate him for his efforts.

== Reception ==
Reception

Aggregate scores
Aggregator	Score
GameRankings	(PS3) 86.59% (X360) 86.46% (PC) 77.15% (PSP) 62.38%
Metacritic	(X360) 86/100 (PS3) 84/100 (PC) 76/100 (PSP) 61/100

Review scores
Publication	Score
Edge	(X360) 7/10 (PC) 6/10
Electronic Gaming Monthly	8/10
Eurogamer	(X360) 8/10 (PC) 7/10
Game Informer	(X360) 8.75/10 (PS3) 8.5/10
GamePro	(X360) 4.25/5 (PS3) 4/5
GameRevolution	C+
GameSpot	(X360) 8.7/10 (PS3) 8.5/10 (PC) 7/10 (PSP) 6.5/10
GameSpy	5/5 (PC) 3.5/5
GameTrailers	(X360) 9.2/10 (PC) 7.6/10
GameZone	(PS3) 9/10 (PC) 8/10 (PSP) 6/10
IGN	(X360, AU) 9.2/10 (X360, US) 9.1/10 (X360, UK) 9/10 (PS3) 8.3/10 (Mobile) 7.7/10 (PC) 7.2/10 (PSP) 6/10
Official Xbox Magazine (US)	9/10
PC Gamer (US)	83%
The Sydney Morning Herald	4.5/5
USA Today	9.5/10

Reviews of the game were favorable upon release, although the Windows version of the game got lower scores than the console versions. GameRankings and Metacritic gave it a score of 86.59% and 84 out of 100 for the PlayStation 3 version; 86.46% and 86 out of 100 for the Xbox 360 version; 77.15% and 76 out of 100 for the PC version; and 62.38% and 61 out of 100 for the PSP version.

During the 11th Annual Interactive Achievement Awards, Advanced Warfighter 2 received a nomination for "Outstanding Achievement in Sound Design" by the Academy of Interactive Arts & Sciences.

As of April 26, 2007, Tom Clancy's Ghost Recon Advanced Warfighter 2 has sold 1 million copies on the Xbox 360. It was also named Game of the Month by Game Informer for May 2007.

=== Controversy ===
Controversy surrounded the game when the Mayor of Ciudad Juárez, Héctor Murguía Lardizábal, criticized the game for trying to scare tourists away from going to the town. Chihuahua's governor José Reyes condemned the game for insulting Mexico and its people, calling on all authorities to seize the game if it were sold on Mexican soil.
