= Wanted: Weapons of Fate =

2008 video game

- Developers: Grin; I-play (mobile)
- Publishers: Warner Bros. Interactive Entertainment; I-play (mobile)
- Directors: Ulf Andersson; Saul Gascón Barba
- Producer: Cristina Paradés
- Designers: Morten Sandholt; Edward Andrew Kay
- Programmers: Pierre Terdiman; Andreas Jönsson; Tobias Persson; Martin Waern
- Artist: Roger Calvet
- Writer: John Zuur Platten
- Composers: Trond-Viggo Melssen; Danny Elfman
- Engine: Diesel Engine
- Platforms: Mobile phone; Microsoft Windows; PlayStation 3; Xbox 360
- Release: Mobile; 30 June 2008; Windows, PlayStation 3, Xbox 360: NA: 24 March 2009; AU: 31 March 2009; EU: 3 April 2009
- Genre: Third-person shooter
- Mode: Single-player

Wanted: Weapons of Fate is a third-person shooter video game, first developed and published by I-play in 2008, before being developed by Grin and published by Warner Bros. Interactive and distributed by Universal Studios in 2009. The game is based on the film of the same name, to which it serves as a sequel. It was released for mobile phones, Microsoft Windows, PlayStation 3, and Xbox 360.

== Plot ==
Set about five hours after the events of the film, Wesley Gibson continues his transformation into a full-fledged assassin and heir to a legacy of a secret fraternity of assassins. He continues his quest with a new mission to seek out the French chapter of the Fraternity, hunt down the Immortal, and finally discover the truth about his family.

The story begins with Wesley having a recurring bad dream that ends the same way: with a mysterious killer that murders Wesley's mother. He wakes to find that his apartment has been breached by a squadron of SWAT-like soldiers. They ransack Wesley's apartment and finally come upon a picture of his mother, Alyse. Breaking it, they find a decoded kill order in its frame. After hunting down these intruders, Wesley confronts Araña (Spanish for "Spider"), an assassin sent by the Barcelona Fraternity.

Pekwarsky (the Fraternity's master bullet-maker) arrives, manages to drive Araña off, and notifies Wesley that he's the #1 target on the Fraternity's black list. He also tells him that it will dispatch its minions to the recently ravaged Chicago Fraternity in order to collect the Loom of Fate.

Wesley uses this tip to make a return visit to the wreckage of the Chicago chapter house, the place he destroyed in the movie. Inside, he confronts the Russian, who notices that Fox's body is gone, and kills him. On his arm, he notices a binary code and severs it for further inspection. Pekwarsky tells him that the Russian was one of the Guardians sent to collect the Loom. Three of these are sent from various Fraternities and their codes reveal the place where they intend to move the Loom. He also informs Wesley that he is meeting a buyer by the name of Brummel who ordered a crate of bullets with Wesley's name on it.

Wesley tags along and kills Brummel, taking his piece of the code as well. However, Wesley notices that Pekwarsky is holding something back - Pekwarsky's really after the kill order that was taken at the beginning of the game. Wesley then gains the Killer suit and the Nightshade pistol. Along the way, Wesley kills Araña and takes her code as well. He then descends into the crypt and finds his father's mummified body. He takes the Fire Eater guns placed in his hands and promises him that he'll take care of the Immortal.

Throughout the game, there are several flashbacks to reveal Cross' story from the beginning as told by Pekwarsky. He first has to guard Alyse, who has recently given birth to Wesley. However, he fails as the Immortal shoots her and he barely escapes with the baby intact. Later, on a mission to kill a member of the Fraternity given to him by Sloan, Cross engages the Immortal on an airliner, only to escape in a red Dodge Viper. After he returns to the Fraternity, he confronts Sloan for giving him a false kill order and framing him as a rogue assassin. Before the two can quarrel, the Paris Fraternity invades the Chicago Fraternity looking for Cross. During the fight, he discovers a kill order for Sloan and realizes his treachery. However, Sloan turns Cross' comrades against him and Cross is forced to flee after the Immortal. In a duel with him, Cross manages to fire a bullet straight into the Immortal's gun which explodes, severely damaging the Immortal's face.

Back in the present, Wesley heads to confront the Immortal. However, just before they have a final duel, the Immortal reveals a twist; it was Cross who killed Alyse, with the two lovers mutually agreeing that following the Code was the only way it could end. The Immortal was merely sent to kill Wesley, who was considered an abomination by the Code.

After defeating the Immortal, Wesley has a philosophical dialogue with the Immortal. The latter says that even though Wesley's parents were fanatics, they put their faith in the Loom, and that no great human endeavour was ever achieved without faith. Wesley has had enough, and fires the bullet with Wesley's name on it at the Immortal. Endings vary depending whether the PC or the console version of the game is played. On the console, it ends with Wesley killing the Immortal while on the PC, it ends with the bullet missing the Immortal's head and Wesley urinating in his face.

== Gameplay ==
Gameplay is a third person cover shooter with the ability to use adrenaline to slow down time and curve bullets. Some levels contain QTE sequences with on-rail shooter elements.

The player controls Wesley Gibson / The Killer II, while in flashback sequences, the player controls Cross / The Killer I, Wesley's father. His father's Fire Eater guns can curve Shrapnel bullets, an explosive variation of the regular bullets. The player also can use other characters that can be unlocked by defeating bosses: the SWAT leader, the Russian, Brummel and Araña/Spider.

== Development ==
It was announced that a demo would be released on Xbox Live and the PlayStation Network on 5 March 2009. The demo features the level Fear Of Flying, allowing the player to take control of Cross as he attempts to escape from a group of enemies on an airplane flying at 30,000 feet above ground. It also included tutorial levels where players learn how to use basic combat skills, as well as the bullet-curve & enhanced quick time movement (bullet time) gameplay, mechanics. The demo included a cut-scene introducing 'The Immortal', the main antagonist of the game. Wanted: Weapons of Fate was released on 24 March 2009 in America and on 3 April in the UK.

Wesley still has actor James McAvoy's likeness despite his voice being provided by Jimmi Simpson. The costume worn by Wesley in the original Wanted comic was given to the game version "to make the comic-book fans happy" and make him "look really badass". Thomas Kretschmann and Terence Stamp reprise their roles as Cross and Pekwarsky, and Paz Vega voices Araña, a character inspired by Angelina Jolie's Fox.

== Music ==
Weapons of Fate uses expanded and looped musical cues from the Wanted: Original Motion Picture Soundtrack by Danny Elfman. In addition, the track "The Little Things", performed by Elfman, was remixed by British music outfit Unkle to be used as the game's title song. The Wanted: Weapons of Fate - The Little Things (UNKLE Variation) [Soundtrack from the Video Game] - Single was sold as a digital download as of 31 March 2009.

== Reception ==
Reception

Aggregate score
Aggregator	Score			
Aggregator	mobile	PC	PS3	Xbox 360
Metacritic	N/A	62/100	61/100	62/100

Review scores
Publication	Score			
Publication	mobile	PC	PS3	Xbox 360
Eurogamer	N/A	N/A	N/A	6/10
Famitsu	N/A	N/A	27/40	27/40
Game Informer	N/A	N/A	6.25/10	6.25/10
GamePro	N/A	N/A	2.5/5	2.5/5
GameRevolution	N/A	B−	B−	B−
GameSpot	N/A	N/A	6/10	6/10
GameSpy	N/A	N/A	2.5/5	2.5/5
GameTrailers	N/A	N/A	7.2/10	N/A
GameZone	N/A	N/A	N/A	7/10
Giant Bomb	N/A	3/5	3/5	3/5
IGN	6.5/10	7.3/10	7.3/10	7.3/10
Official Xbox Magazine (US)	N/A	N/A	N/A	7.5/10
PC Gamer (US)	N/A	68%	N/A	N/A
PlayStation: The Official Magazine	N/A	N/A	3.5/5	N/A
The A.V. Club	N/A	N/A	N/A	B
The Daily Telegraph	N/A	N/A	6/10	6/10

Wanted: Weapons of Fate received "mixed" reviews on all platforms according to the review aggregation website Metacritic. In Australia, Hyper's Yuri Spaceface commended the game, stating that it did not "simply ape the action of the movie/comic [and] the assassin skills are nicely done". However, he criticised it for being "flashy and loud, but ultimately really quite shallow". In Japan, where the PlayStation 3 and Xbox 360 versions were ported and published by Spike on 25 June 2009, Famitsu gave it a score of three sevens and one six for a total of 27 out of 40.

Entertainment Weekly gave it a B, stating that it met the same thrill expectations as the film. The A.V. Club gave the Xbox 360 version a B, saying that it was "Grim, nonsensical, and yet oddly satisfying. If you're in the mood for a short, sweet, guilty pleasure, Wanted: Weapons Of Fate has what you need." 411Mania gave the PS3 version a score of 6.8 out of 10, saying that "If you loved the movie and love third person shooters you will love Wanted: Weapons of Fate. But with little replayability and a short single player campaign don't expect to get any longevity out of the game. For most people Wanted will be a good rental before returning to other shooters." However, The Daily Telegraph gave the PS3 and Xbox 360 versions six out of ten and stated that "Due to [the game's] shortness of length, repetitive (and at times annoying) gameplay and non-existent re-play value, it's hard to justify paying the full recommended retail price for it." Teletext GameCentral gave the PS3 version five out of ten, saying that it was "Exactly the game you'd expect to result from the film, with fun effects but no variety or depth." Edge gave it a score of four out of ten, saying, "A stunt-filled shooter in the vein (but not the league) of Stranglehold, it's a game that takes control away, reverts to how things used to be done, and judders between debilitating combat and haywire presentation."

The game sold 130,000 units through all platforms as of July 2009.
