= Tom Clancy's Ghost Recon Advanced Warfighter =

2006 video game

- Developers: Xbox 360; Tiwak; Ubisoft Paris; Red Storm Entertainment; Xbox; Ubisoft Shanghai; PlayStation 2 Ubisoft Paris; Darkworks; Microsoft Windows; Grin
- Publisher: Ubisoft
- Producers: Yann Le Tensorer; Pauline Jacquey
- Designers: Gilles Matouba; Christophe Pic; Christian Allen; Chase Jones
- Artist: Jean-Christophe Alessandri
- Writer: Gérard Lehiany
- Composer: Tom Salta
- Series: Tom Clancy's Ghost Recon
- Engine: Diesel (PC) Unreal Engine 2 (Xbox)
- Platforms: Xbox 360, Xbox, PlayStation 2, Microsoft Windows
- Release: Xbox 360: NA: March 7, 2006; EU: March 10, 2006; Xbox: NA: March 7, 2006; EU: March 17, 2006; PlayStation 2: NA: March 30, 2006; EU: March 31, 2006; Microsoft Windows: NA: May 2, 2006; EU: May 5, 2006
- Genre: Tactical shooter
- Modes: Single-player, multiplayer

Tom Clancy's Ghost Recon Advanced Warfighter is a 2006 tactical shooter video game developed and published by Ubisoft. It was released for the Xbox 360, Xbox, PlayStation 2 and Microsoft Windows. As in previous Ghost Recon games, players command their team while neutralizing hostile forces and completing various mission objectives. These objectives can range from escorting friendly units across the map to rescuing hostages or taking out enemy artillery.

The game places emphasis on using cover effectively in order to stay alive, together with sound strategic co-ordination to successfully complete mission objectives. A new feature is the Integrated Warfighter System, a system based upon the Future Force Warrior program.

Tom Clancy's Ghost Recon Advanced Warfighter 2, the game's direct sequel, was released a year later in 2007. The Xbox 360 version was released for Xbox One backwards compatibility in 2018.

== Gameplay ==
Early screenshot of Xbox 360 version

Gameplay emphasis in Tom Clancy's Ghost Recon Advanced Warfighter is placed upon the player doing the bulk of the fighting in each mission, while relying on tactical combat rather than arcade run-and-gun shooting to overcome enemies. Combat in the game is more forgiving than in previous titles in the series, with players being able to survive several bullet hits before dying, instead of dying after only a few shots like in the original Tom Clancy's Ghost Recon. However, players are unable to regain lost health in the middle of a mission, and a single headshot or a sustained burst of fire can still kill the player instantly.

GRAW features numerous firearms, many based on real weapons, including the Heckler & Koch G36, the Beretta M9, and the FN SCAR, in addition to prototypes such as the MR-C. The game also makes use of various other pieces of equipment, including tanks, helicopters, armored personnel carriers, and remote-controlled unmanned aerial vehicles, which can be used tactically to overcome obstacles, and scout out the environment, in order to complete objectives. GRAW features three versions of the game that each have slight minor variations in storyline/missions depending on the version; the main storyline, though, remains the same between the versions. While both the PlayStation 2 and Xbox versions are essentially the same title, the Xbox 360 and Windows versions each stand out on their own with their own unique features, including the ability to command a squad of soldiers indirectly.

=== Cross-Com System ===
One unique feature of the gameplay is the cross-com system, which is designed to allow indirect control over friendly units, assisting them on a mission (e.g. helicopters, UAV drones, etc.), by giving them commands on what to do, whether to locate enemies or deal with a particular threat encountered. This system can be used in conjunction with the game's Intel map - a tactical map showing the entire play area and location of objectives, enemies and friendlies/allies - to issue commands. Notably, this gameplay feature varies between the different versions. For the Xbox 360 version, the system highlights enemies spotted by both the player and both their squad and other allies, while the Microsoft Windows version only highlights enemies seen by the player's squad and not themselves.

=== PlayStation 2 & Xbox versions ===
Both the PlayStation 2 and Xbox console versions of Tom Clancy's Ghost Recon Advanced Warfighter are played in first-person, but have notably fewer features than those found in the Xbox 360 or the Windows versions. The most notable differences to the other versions is that players only have a single AI-controlled teammate following them on missions (as opposed to a squad of 3 soldiers), there are more levels but of shorter lengths, and that player character Scott Mitchell never speaks throughout these versions.

=== Xbox 360 version ===
Unlike all other versions of GRAW, the Xbox 360 version gives players a choice between using either a third-person or first-person perspective during the campaign mode, and also features a unique covering system that allows the player to duck behind objects for protection from gun-fire while performing tactical maneuvers. In addition, some levels feature on-rail sections in which players must eliminate as many enemies as possible from their airborne transport via the use of a mounted gun, and if a mission provides them with a squad, orders given via the cross-com system apply to the entire squad, and not to individual squad members. Players cannot recover ammo from fallen enemies but can take their weapons if needed; otherwise they must re-arm at either rally points or ammo stations.

=== Microsoft Windows version ===
The Microsoft Windows version of Tom Clancy's Ghost Recon Advanced Warfighter is played from a first-person perspective. This version features larger levels than those of the console versions with enemy AI more likely to use ambush tactics, thus greater emphasis is placed upon using squad tactics and having more situational awareness in each mission. The cross-com system in this version is more flexible, capable of issuing more controlled commands to individual squad members, as well as plotting out attack routes and battle plans for other friendly units. In addition, players cannot pick up discarded weapons, unlike the other versions, but can take ammunition from the weapons of dead enemies or allies, if the player's weapon is of the same caliber.

Unlike other versions, players may select the loadouts for their selected team before the start of a mission, although this is done with no briefing given, with each member able to carry a primary weapon and a secondary weapon, while either carrying extra ammunition or a heat-seeking anti-tank weapon. Unlike other versions, every Ghost member has a maximum weight limit on how much they can carry, with them becoming fatigued from sprinting at a much faster rate the more equipment they are carrying. Weapons are able to be modified with various attachments, such as optical sights, grenade launchers, silencers, and vertical foregrips, and each modification has used on a weapon has its advantages and disadvantages. For example, attaching a grenade launcher reduces accuracy and adds weight, while adding a silencer reduces noise and muzzle flash of a weapon at the expense of accuracy and range.

The Microsoft Windows version can take advantage of the presence of a PhysX card, however the enhancements are only cosmetic and do not affect gameplay.

=== Multiplayer ===
Online multiplayer on the Microsoft Windows edition has both versus and co-op mode. Versus mode features 32 players, double that of the Xbox 360 version. The online co-op mode only supports up to 4 players maximum on Windows, while the Xbox 360 version supports up to 16 co-op players.

On the Xbox 360 version, some new Xbox Live features are included: the co-operative campaign (which currently features 8 missions - 4 of which are available on the Xbox Live Marketplace) and multiplayer maps are all set in Nicaragua as a follow-up to the Mexico City missions of the single player campaign.

- On June 22, Ubisoft released the Chapter 2 Downloadable Content for 1,200 Microsoft Points on the Xbox Live Marketplace. The price was later reduced to 600.

In the UK, a special Game of the Year edition was released in late 2006 containing a card enabling the player to obtain all marketplace content for free, including the Chapter 2 download.

The PlayStation 2 and Xbox versions have some similar online game modes and can be played with up to 8 players.

== Plot ==
In 2013, United States president Ballantine, Mexican president Ruiz-Peña, and the Canadian prime minister meet to sign the North American Joint Security Agreement (NAJSA) in Mexico City to cooperate in national security and anti-smuggling initiatives. Elsewhere in the city, a Ghost team led by Captain Scott Mitchell is deployed to recover Guardrail IX, an American communications disruptor device stolen from a spy plane that was shot down in Nicaragua.

However, a coup d'état suddenly occurs and the NAJSA conference is attacked by militants who kill the Canadian Prime Minister, prompting Ghost commander General Joshua Keating to reroute Mitchell's team to extract Ballantine and Ruiz-Peña. The Ghosts rescue them and defeat anti-air emplacements at Mexico City International Airport, while Ruiz-Peña survives an assassination attempt at the U.S. embassy after the Ghosts intervene. News reports reveal the coup is being spearheaded by the Aguila 7, a rogue special forces unit led by General Ontiveros and his son Colonel Carlos Ontiveros. Stuck in Mexico City, Ballantine and Ruiz-Peña agree to authorize a U.S. military intervention to support the Mexican Armed Forces and restore order.

Mitchell's Ghost team is ordered by Major General Martin to clear a route to Mexico City, where they defeat artillery and anti-air batteries, assault Chapultepec Castle, and secure M1A2 Abrams tanks for the Mexican Army. Aguila 7 kidnaps Ballantine and hides him in the slums, but while the Ghosts rescue him, they find the nuclear football is missing, and discover Aguila 7 is using Guardrail IX to disrupt U.S. military communications. Mitchell's team locates and destroys most of Guardrail IX before supporting a joint advance into Zocalo Plaza and rescue Major General Martin from a helicopter crash. Keating and Ballantine learn the nuclear football and remnants of Guardrail IX are being used by Aguila 7 to hack NORAD and gain control over American ICBMs, causing Russia and China to ready their own and buying time to gain international support for the coup.

Mitchell's team spearheads the final assault on Palacio Nacional, destroying the last elements of Guardrail IX and capturing General Ontiveros, but Carlos flees with the nuclear football in a stolen Ghost Sikorsky UH-60 Black Hawk. Mitchell's team pursues Carlos to the U.S. embassy, where they defeat Aguila 7, kill Carlos, and recover the nuclear football. As the Ghosts prepare to leave, Barnes confirms a retired U.S. Army general who opposed NAJSA betrayed the U.S. to give Guardrail IX to Ontiveros.

== Reception ==
Reception

Aggregate scores
Aggregator	Score
GameRankings	(X360) 90.47% (PC) 80.07% (Xbox) 64.57% (PS2) 50.67%
Metacritic	(X360) 90/100 (PC) 80/100 (Xbox) 66/100 (PS2) 44/100

Review scores
Publication	Score
AllGame	4.5/5
Edge	8/10
Eurogamer	7/10
Game Informer	(X360) 9.5/10 (Xbox) 7.5/10
GamePro	4/5
GameRevolution	B+
GameSpot	(X360) 9.2/10 (PC) 7.8/10 (Xbox) 5.9/10 (PS2) 4.4/10
GameSpy	(X360) 5/5 (PC) 3/5 (Xbox) 2.5/5
GameTrailers	(X360) 9.9/10 (PC) 9.1/10
GameZone	(X360) 9.3/10 (PC) 8.8/10
IGN	(X360) 9.2/10 (PC) 8.1/10 (Xbox) 6/10 (PS2) 3.7/10
Official U.S. PlayStation Magazine	1.5/5
Official Xbox Magazine (US)	(X360) 9/10 (Xbox) 6/10
PC Gamer (US)	65%
The Sydney Morning Herald	5/5

Awards
Publication	Award
BAFTA	Best Game
BAFTA	Best Technical Achievement

In May 2005, the Xbox 360 edition of Advanced Warfighter was shown to the press in trailer form at the E3 (Electronic Entertainment Expo) convention in Los Angeles.

The Xbox 360 version of Ghost Recon: Advanced Warfighter was released on March 7, 2006 to multiple rave reviews. GameRankings and Metacritic gave it a score of 90.47% and 90 out of 100. Electronic Gaming Monthly praised the game's stunning next-generation presentation and high entertainment value, giving it an average score of 9.5 out of 10. The game was noted for its deeply immersive atmosphere, smart A.I. (though flawed for the squad and VIP A.I.), wide variety of weapons, multiple action scenes and believable storyline. The Xbox 360's version was particularly noted for its realistic graphics. GameTrailers gave the game its highest review ever, a 9.9 out of 10, stating that GRAW is a landmark next-gen game that redefines shooters. TeamXbox gave the X360 version a score of 9.3 out of 10, saying that it has "some of the best modern combat scenarios you'll have ever taken part in. Ubisoft is not only kicking the door in with Advanced Warfighter, they are taking the whole damn building down along with it!"

Reviews for other platforms ranged from positive to mixed to negative. GameRankings and Metacritic gave the game a score of 80.07% and 80 out of 100 for the PC version; 64.57% and 66 out of 100 for the Xbox version; and 50.67% and 44 out of 100 for the PlayStation 2 version.

On October 5, 2006, Ghost Recon: Advanced Warfighter won two out of the eight nominated BAVGA awards including, "Best Technical Achievement" and "Best Game". During the 10th Annual Interactive Achievement Awards, the Academy of Interactive Arts & Sciences nominated Advanced Warfighter in the categories of "Outstanding Achievement in Online Gameplay" and "Outstanding Achievement in Sound Design".

=== Sales ===
Ghost Recon Advanced Warfighter was a commercial success, selling more than 1.6 million copies by the end of March 2006. Its Xbox 360 release made up 800,000 of these sales, which made it the console's fastest-selling title by that date. The Xbox 360 version sold 360,000 units within a week of release, including 240,000 sales in North America. Europe bought 120,000 copies within three days of release. Sales of Advanced Warfighter's computer and Xbox 360 versions rose by another 560,000 copies between April 1 and June 30, 2006. By the end of September, the game's total sales had surpassed 2.4 million units.

Advanced Warfighter sold 1.2 million in the United States, 8,903 in Japan, and 200,000 in the United Kingdom.
